= Athletics at the 2015 Pan American Games – Men's marathon =

Men's marathon at the 2015 Pan American Games
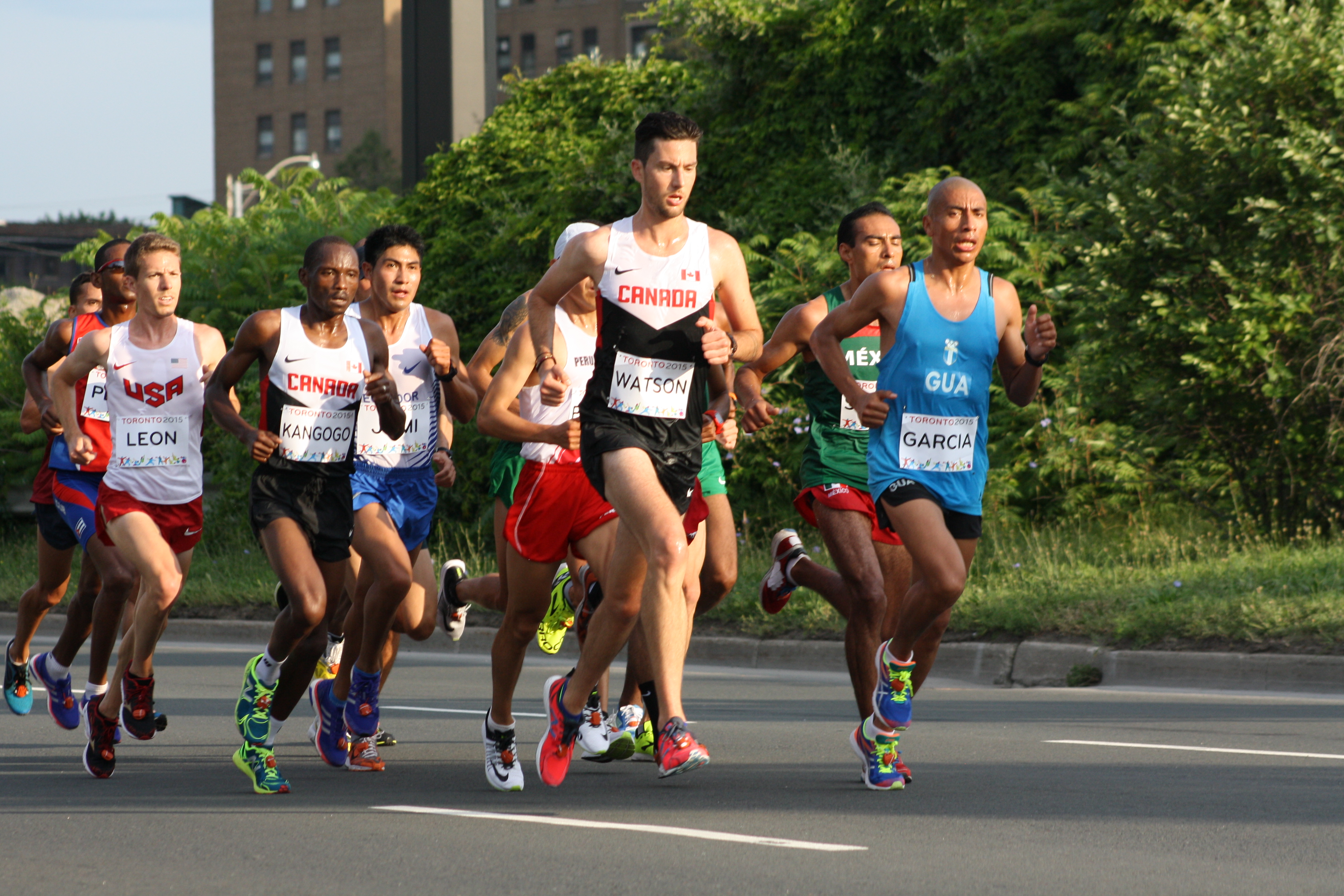
- Venue: Ontario Place West Channel
- Dates: July 25
- Competitors: 18 from 12 nations
- Winning time: 2:17:04

Medalists
Gold medal	Richer Pérez	Cuba
Silver medal	Raúl Pacheco	Peru
Bronze medal	Mariano Mastromarino	Argentina

The men's marathon competition of the athletics events at the 2015 Pan American Games took place on the 25 of July on a temporary circuit around the Ontario Place West Channel. The defending Pan American Games champion is Solonei da Silva of Brazil.

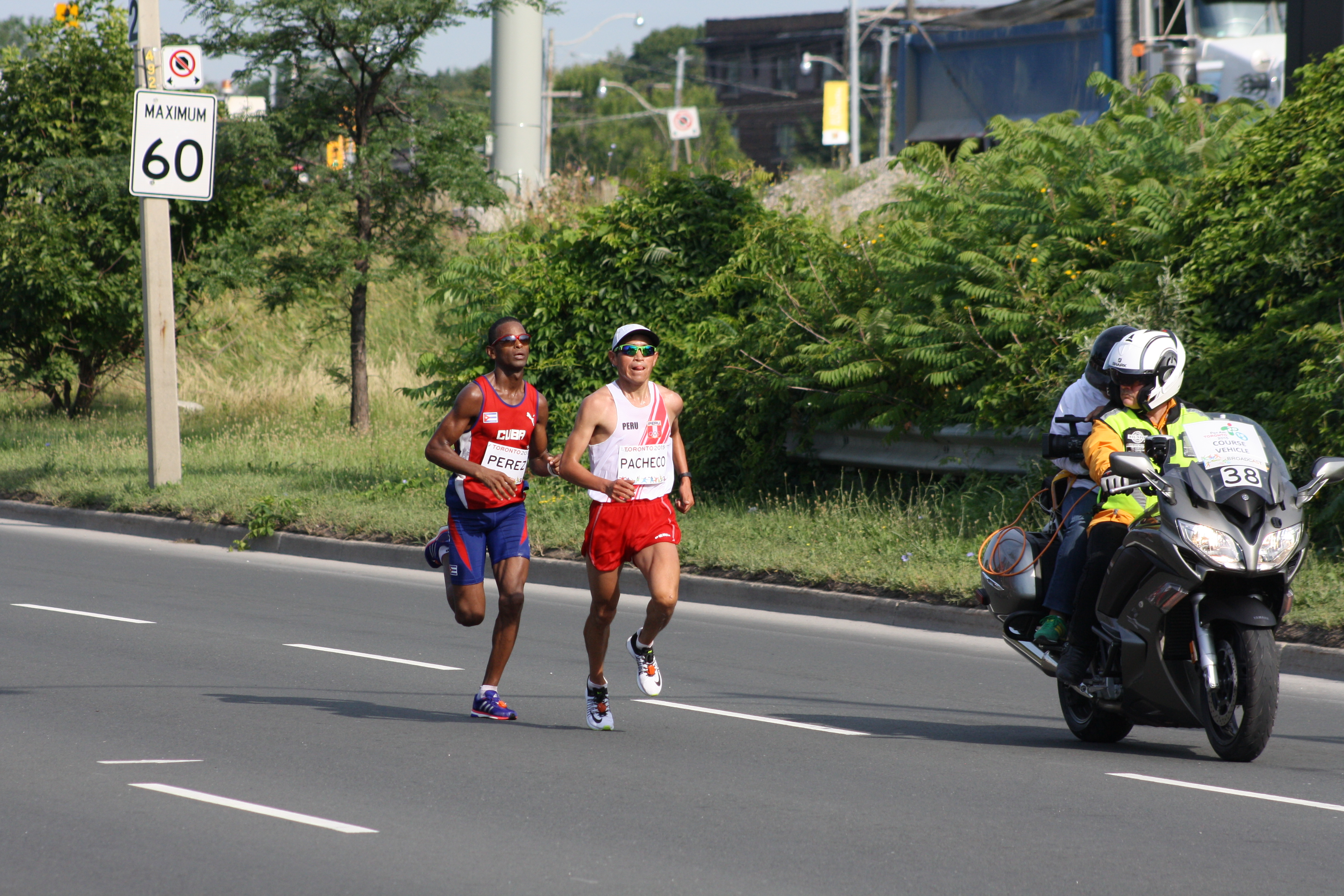
Richer Pérez of Cuba and Raúl Pacheco of Peru fight for the lead at the Pan American Games marathon in 2015.

== Qualification ==
Each National Olympic Committee (NOC) was able to enter up to two entrants providing they had met the minimum standard (2.21.00) in the qualifying period (January 1, 2014 to June 28, 2015).

== Schedule ==
Date	Time	Round
July 25, 2015	7:05	Final

== Abbreviations ==
- All times shown are in hours:minutes:seconds

KEY:	q	Fastest non-qualifiers	Q	Qualified	NR	National record	PB	Personal best	SB	Seasonal best	DQ	Disqualified

== Results ==
Rank	Athlete	Nation	Time	Notes
1st place, gold medalist(s)	Richer Pérez	Cuba	2:17:04	PB
2nd place, silver medalist(s)	Raúl Pacheco	Peru	2:17:13	
3rd place, bronze medalist(s)	Mariano Mastromarino	Argentina	2:17:45	
4	Daniel Vargas	Mexico	2:17:57	
5	Craig Leon	United States	2:19:26	
6	Tim Young	United States	2:19:34	
7	Aguelmis Rojas	Uruguay	2:20:10	SB
8	Rob Watson	Canada	2:23:43	
9	Kip Kangogo	Canada	2:24:02	
10	Raúl Machacuay	Peru	2:24:29	
11	Segundo Jami	Ecuador	2:26:27	
12	José Amado García	Guatemala	2:28:08	
13	Ubiratan dos Santos	Brazil	2:34:53	
	Alejandro Suárez	Mexico	DNF	
	Franck de Almeida	Brazil	DNF	
	Roberto Echeverría	Chile	DNF	
	Luis Orta	Venezuela	DNF	
	Cristopher Guajardo	Chile	DNS	
