= Athletics at the 2011 Pan American Games – Men's marathon =

Men's marathon at the 2011 Pan American Games
- Venue: Pan American Marathon circuit
- Dates: October 30
- Competitors: 21 from 14 nations

Medalists
Gold medal	Solonei da Silva	Brazil
Silver medal	Diego Colorado	Colombia
Bronze medal	Juan Carlos Cardona	Colombia

The men's marathon competition of the athletics events at the 2011 Pan American Games took place on the 30 of October at the Pan American Marathon circuit. The defending Pan American Games champion is Franck de Almeida of Brazil.

== Records ==
World record	Patrick Makau Musyoki (KEN)	2:03:38	Berlin, Germany	September 25, 2011
Pan American Games record	Jorge González (PUR)	2:12:43	Caracas, Venezuela	August 28, 1983

== Qualification standards ==
This event did not require any qualification standard be met.

== Schedule ==
Date	Time	Round
October 30, 2011	8:30	Final

== Abbreviations ==
- All times shown are in hours:minutes:seconds

KEY:	q	Fastest non-qualifiers	Q	Qualified	NR	National record	PB	Personal best	SB	Seasonal best	DQ	Disqualified

== Results ==
21 athletes from 14 countries competed.

=== Final ===
Rank	Athlete	Nation	Time	Notes
1st place, gold medalist(s)	Solonei da Silva	Brazil	2:16:37	
2nd place, silver medalist(s)	Diego Colorado	Colombia	2:17:13	PB
3rd place, bronze medalist(s)	Juan Carlos Cardona	Colombia	2:18:20	
4	Luis Rivera	Puerto Rico	2:19:06	SB
5	José Amado García	Guatemala	2:20:27	SB
6	Carlos Cordero	Mexico	2:20:49	
7	Constantino León	Peru	2:21:18	
8	Patrick Rizzo	United States	2:21:58	
9	Jean da Silva	Brazil	2:22:41	
10	Tomas Luna	Mexico	2:23:47	
11	Alfredo Arévalo	Guatemala	2:25:53	
12	Raul Manuel Pacheco	Peru	2:27:39	
13	Franklin Tenorio	Ecuador	2:28:25	
14	Ausberto Lucas	Bolivia	2:31:30	
15	Henrry Jaen	Cuba	2:31:30	
16	Franklin Aduviri	Bolivia	2:33:49	
17	Dimas Castro	Nicaragua	2:47:25	
18	Larryn Sanchez	Venezuela	2:50:20	
19	Williams Sanchez	El Salvador	3:07:25	
	Jeffrey Eggleston	United States	DNF	
	Johnny Loria	Costa Rica	DNF	
