= Athletics at the 2011 Pan American Games – Men's 110 metres hurdles =

Coordinates: 20°43′39.4″N 103°22′53.4″W

Men's 110 metres hurdles at the 2011 Pan American Games
- Venue: Telmex Athletics Stadium
- Dates: October 27–28
- Competitors: 16 from 12 nations

Medalists
Gold medal	Dayron Robles	Cuba
Silver medal	Paulo Villar	Colombia
Bronze medal	Orlando Ortega	Cuba

The men's 110 metres hurdles sprint competition of the athletics events at the 2011 Pan American Games took place between the 27 and 28 of October at the Telmex Athletics Stadium. The defending Pan American Games champion was Dayron Robles of Cuba.

== Records ==
Prior to this competition, the existing world and Pan American Games records were as follows:

World record	Dayron Robles (CUB)	12.87	Ostrava, Czech Republic	June 12, 2008
Pan American Games record	Anier García (CUB)	13.17	Winnipeg, Canada	July 30, 1999

== Qualification ==
Each National Olympic Committee (NOC) was able to enter one athlete regardless if they had met the qualification standard. To enter two entrants both athletes had to have met the minimum standard (14.40) in the qualifying period (January 1, 2010 to September 14, 2011).

== Schedule ==
Date	Time	Round
October 27, 2011	14:00	Semifinals
October 28, 2011	15:45	Final

== Results ==
All times shown are in seconds.

KEY:	q	Fastest non-qualifiers	Q	Qualified	NR	National record	PB	Personal best	SB	Seasonal best	DQ	Disqualified

=== Semifinals ===
Held on October 27. The first three in each heat and the next two fastest advanced to the finals.

Wind:
Heat 1: +0.6, Heat 2: +1.8

Rank	Heat	Name	Nationality	Time	Notes
1	2	Dayron Robles	Cuba	13.22	Q
2	1	Orlando Ortega	Cuba	13.33	Q
3	1	Paulo Villar	Colombia	13.39	Q, SB
4	1	Jeffrey Porter	United States	13.47	Q
5	2	Dominic Berger	United States	13.62	Q
6	2	Matheus Facho Inocêncio	Brazil	13.67	Q
7	2	Hector Cotto	Puerto Rico	13.69	q
8	1	Enrique Llanos	Puerto Rico	13.70	q
9	2	Jorge McFarlane	Peru	13.72	PB
10	1	Carlos Jorge	Dominican Republic	13.80	
11	2	Ronald Bennett	Honduras	13.81	PB
12	1	Eric Keddo	Jamaica	13.83	
13	2	Jeffrey Julmis	Haiti	13.87	
14	2	Renan Palma	El Salvador	14.19	PB
15	1	Jhon Tamayo	Ecuador	14.22	
16	1	Javier McFarlane	Peru	14.30	

=== Final ===
Held on October 28.

Wind: +1.6

Rank	Name	Nationality	Time	Notes
1st place, gold medalist(s)	Dayron Robles	Cuba	13.10	GR
2nd place, silver medalist(s)	Paulo Villar	Colombia	13.27	AR
3rd place, bronze medalist(s)	Orlando Ortega	Cuba	13.30	
4	Jeffrey Porter	United States	13.45	
5	Hector Cotto	Puerto Rico	13.49	PB
6	Enrique Llanos	Puerto Rico	13.52	PB
7	Dominic Berger	United States	13.65	
8	Matheus Facho Inocêncio	Brazil	13.76	
