= Athletics at the 2010 Central American and Caribbean Games – Results =

These are the official results of the athletics competition at the 2010 Central American and Caribbean Games which took place on July 24–30, 2010 in Mayagüez, Puerto Rico.

== Men's results ==
=== 100 meters ===
Heats – July 25
Wind:
Heat 1: +1.1 m/s, Heat 2: +1.1 m/s, Heat 3: +1.9 m/s, Heat 4: +1.4 m/s

Rank	Heat	Name	Nationality	Time	Notes
1	4	Daniel Bailey	Antigua and Barbuda	10.07	Q
2	2	Churandy Martina	Netherlands Antilles	10.15	Q
3	4	Emmanuel Callander	Trinidad and Tobago	10.16	q
4	2	Oshane Bailey	Jamaica	10.17	q
5	1	Keston Bledman	Trinidad and Tobago	10.21	Q
6	3	Lerone Clarke	Jamaica	10.23	Q
6	4	Adrian Griffith	Bahamas	10.23	q
8	3	Rolando Palacios	Honduras	10.26	q
9	3	Daniel Grueso	Colombia	10.28	
10	4	Brian Mariano	Netherlands Antilles	10.32	
11	1	Isidro Montoya	Colombia	10.34	
12	2	Miguel López	Puerto Rico	10.39	
13	3	Yavid Zackey	Puerto Rico	10.41	
14	1	Adam Harris	Guyana	10.44	
15	3	Michael Sands	Bahamas	10.49	
15	4	Antoine Adams	Saint Kitts and Nevis	10.49	PB
17	1	Brijesh Lawrence	Saint Kitts and Nevis	10.51	
17	2	David Walters	United States Virgin Islands	10.51	
19	1	Shannon King	Antigua and Barbuda	10.56	
20	2	Marvin Bien-Aime	Haiti	10.65	SB
21	3	Jorge Solorzano	Guatemala	10.70	
22	1	Courtny Bascombe	Saint Vincent and the Grenadines	10.73	SB
23	3	Harold Houston III	Bermuda	10.74	SB
24	2	Josef Norales	Honduras	10.81	
25	1	Ifrish Alberg	Suriname	10.89	
26	4	Richard Ibeh	Cayman Islands	11.24	
27	4	Gordon McKenzie	Guyana	27.49	

Final – July 25
Wind:
+0.7 m/s

Rank	Lane	Name	Nationality	Time	Notes
1st place, gold medalist(s)	6	Churandy Martina	Netherlands Antilles	10.07	
2nd place, silver medalist(s)	4	Daniel Bailey	Antigua and Barbuda	10.08	
3rd place, bronze medalist(s)	3	Lerone Clarke	Jamaica	10.15	
4	8	Oshane Bailey	Jamaica	10.20	
5	1	Adrian Griffith	Bahamas	10.30	
6	2	Rolando Palacios	Honduras	10.31	
7	5	Keston Bledman	Trinidad and Tobago	10.32	
	7	Emmanuel Callander	Trinidad and Tobago	DQ	

=== 200 meters ===
Heats – July 27
Wind:
Heat 1: -1.0 m/s, Heat 2: -1.0 m/s, Heat 3: +2.8 m/s, Heat 4: +2.8 m/s

Rank	Heat	Name	Nationality	Time	Notes
1	3	Rondel Sorrillo	Trinidad and Tobago	20.76	Q
2	3	Rasheed Dwyer	Jamaica	20.77	q
3	2	Brendan Christian	Antigua and Barbuda	20.81	Q
4	4	Daniel Grueso	Colombia	20.83	Q
5	4	Emmanuel Callander	Trinidad and Tobago	20.85	q
6	2	Rolando Palacios	Honduras	20.86	q
7	3	Yoel Tapia	Dominican Republic	20.89	q
8	1	Churandy Martina	Netherlands Antilles	20.90	Q
9	2	Brian Mariano	Netherlands Antilles	20.98	
10	2	José Carlos Herrera	Mexico	21.00	
11	4	Jamial Rolle	Bahamas	21.06	
12	4	Steve Slowly	Jamaica	21.08	
13	1	Adam Harris	Guyana	21.12	
14	3	Antoine Adams	Saint Kitts and Nevis	21.14	
15	1	Miguel López	Puerto Rico	21.22	
16	3	Luis Núñez	Colombia	21.27	
17	3	Marvin Bien-Aime	Haiti	21.30	
18	2	Lee Prowell	Guyana	21.43	SB
19	1	Brijesh Lawrence	Saint Kitts and Nevis	21.53	
20	3	Richard Richardson	Antigua and Barbuda	21.60	
21	4	David Hamil	Cayman Islands	21.70	
22	1	Courtney Carl Williams	Saint Vincent and the Grenadines	22.31	
23	1	Josef Norales	Honduras	22.32	
24	2	Courtny Bascombe	Saint Vincent and the Grenadines	22.38	
25	3	Kevin Fahie	British Virgin Islands	22.43	
26	4	Victor Cantillano	Costa Rica	22.60	
27	2	Anthony Celestin	Haiti	22.77	
	4	Yavid Zackey	Puerto Rico	DNF	
	1	Nathaniel McKinney	Bahamas	DQ	
	2	Harold Houston III	Bermuda	DQ	
	4	Erison Hurtault	Dominica	DNS	

Final – July 27
Wind:
0.0 m/s

Rank	Lane	Name	Nationality	Time	Notes
1st place, gold medalist(s)	6	Churandy Martina	Netherlands Antilles	20.25	CR
2nd place, silver medalist(s)	7	Rasheed Dwyer	Jamaica	20.49	PB
3rd place, bronze medalist(s)	3	Rondel Sorrillo	Trinidad and Tobago	20.59	
4	4	Brendan Christian	Antigua and Barbuda	20.59	
5	2	Rolando Palacios	Honduras	20.67	
6	8	Emmanuel Callander	Trinidad and Tobago	20.81	
7	5	Daniel Grueso	Colombia	20.94	
8	1	Yoel Tapia	Dominican Republic	20.97	

=== 400 meters ===
Heats – July 25

Rank	Heat	Name	Nationality	Time	Notes
1	1	Tabarie Henry	United States Virgin Islands	45.40	Q
2	2	Andretti Bain	Bahamas	45.68	Q
3	1	Allodin Fothergill	Jamaica	45.69	Q
4	3	Nery Brenes	Costa Rica	45.82	Q
5	3	Erison Hurtault	Dominica	46.04	Q
6	2	Renny Quow	Trinidad and Tobago	46.09	Q
7	2	Freddy Mezones	Venezuela	46.15	q
8	3	Héctor Carrasquilo	Puerto Rico	46.23	q
9	3	Demetrius Pinder	Bahamas	46.29	
10	1	Zwede Hewitt	Trinidad and Tobago	46.30	
11	2	Oral Thompson	Jamaica	46.59	
12	1	Joel Phillip	Grenada	47.58	
13	3	José Carlos Herrera	Mexico	47.59	SB
14	3	Takeshi Fujiwara	El Salvador	47.66	PB
15	3	Gustavo Cuesta	Dominican Republic	47.70	
16	1	Mario Muguia	Mexico	47.79	
17	2	Kevin Bowen	Grenada	47.86	
18	1	Larry Inanga	Saint Kitts and Nevis	48.23	
19	1	Pedro Suazo	Honduras	48.28	PB
20	2	Gary Robinson	Costa Rica	48.57	
21	1	Arismendy Peguero	Dominican Republic	56.34	
	3	Alberto Aguilar	Venezuela	DNF	
	2	Steve Delice	Haiti	DNS	

Final – July 26

Rank	Lane	Name	Nationality	Time	Notes
1st place, gold medalist(s)	4	Nery Brenes	Costa Rica	44.84	PB
2nd place, silver medalist(s)	6	Tabarie Henry	United States Virgin Islands	45.07	
3rd place, bronze medalist(s)	5	Allodin Fothergill	Jamaica	45.24	PB
4	3	Andretti Bain	Bahamas	45.51	
5	7	Erison Hurtault	Dominica	45.69	
6	2	Freddy Mezones	Venezuela	45.93	PB
7	1	Héctor Carrasquilo	Puerto Rico	45.99	
	8	Renny Quow	Trinidad and Tobago	DNF	

=== 800 meters ===
Heats – July 27

Rank	Heat	Name	Nationality	Time	Notes
1	1	Moise Joseph	Haiti	1:48.63	Q
2	1	Rafith Rodríguez	Colombia	1:48.85	Q
3	1	Eduar Villanueva	Venezuela	1:48.91	Q
4	2	Aaron Evans	Bermuda	1:49.36	Q
5	2	Aldwyn Sappleton	Jamaica	1:49.44	Q
6	2	Gavyn Nero	Trinidad and Tobago	1:49.53	Q
7	2	Tayron Reyes	Dominican Republic	1:49.63	q
8	2	Edgard Cortez	Nicaragua	1:49.73	q, NR
9	1	Ricardo Cunningham	Jamaica	1:49.87	
10	1	James Eichberger	Mexico	1:50.05	
11	2	Pablo Solares	Mexico	1:50.43	
12	1	Nico Herrera	Venezuela	1:50.88	
13	2	Jamaal James	Trinidad and Tobago	1:51.70	
14	1	Jenner Pelico	Guatemala	1:51.80	PB
15	1	Armando Del Valle	Puerto Rico	1:52.44	
16	2	Arnaldo Monge	Costa Rica	1:53.71	

Final – July 29

Rank	Name	Nationality	Time	Notes
1st place, gold medalist(s)	Eduar Villanueva	Venezuela	1:47.73	
2nd place, silver medalist(s)	Moise Joseph	Haiti	1:47.79	
3rd place, bronze medalist(s)	Aldwyn Sappleton	Jamaica	1:48.12	
4	Aaron Evans	Bermuda	1:48.19	
5	Rafith Rodríguez	Colombia	1:48.71	
6	Tayron Reyes	Dominican Republic	1:49.10	SB
7	Gavyn Nero	Trinidad and Tobago	1:49.11	
8	Edgard Cortez	Nicaragua	1:51.62	

=== 1500 meters ===
July 26

Rank	Name	Nationality	Time	Notes
1st place, gold medalist(s)	Juan Luis Barrios	Mexico	3:44.85	
2nd place, silver medalist(s)	Eduar Villanueva	Venezuela	3:45.04	
3rd place, bronze medalist(s)	Pablo Solares	Mexico	3:45.30	
4	Nico Herrera	Venezuela	3:48.97	
5	Shawn Pitter	Jamaica	3:49.65	
6	Cleveland Forde	Guyana	3:50.47	PB
7	José Rivera	Puerto Rico	3:50.99	
8	Freddy Espinosa	Colombia	3:53.90	
9	Alexis Torre	Puerto Rico	3:54.07	

=== 5000 meters ===
July 30

Rank	Name	Nationality	Time	Notes
1st place, gold medalist(s)	Juan Luis Barrios	Mexico	13:44.41	CR
2nd place, silver medalist(s)	Juan Carlos Romero	Mexico	13:56.17	
3rd place, bronze medalist(s)	Cleveland Forde	Guyana	14:08.95	PB
4	Javier Guarín	Colombia	14:12.53	
5	José Raxon	Guatemala	14:16.48	PB
6	Luis Daniel Soto	Puerto Rico	14:36.28	
7	Adrian Rodríguez	Puerto Rico	14:37.86	
8	Dimas Castro	Nicaragua	16:09.76	
	Diego Colorado	Colombia	DNS	
	Guemps Andreville	Haiti	DNS	

=== 10,000 meters ===
July 26

Rank	Name	Nationality	Time	Notes
1st place, gold medalist(s)	Juan Carlos Romero	Mexico	29:13.71	
2nd place, silver medalist(s)	Tomas Luna	Mexico	29:14.15	
3rd place, bronze medalist(s)	Luis Collazo	Puerto Rico	29:36.35	
4	Diego Colorado	Colombia	29:53.43	
5	Richard Jones	Trinidad and Tobago	31:42.06	
6	Dimas Castro	Nicaragua	33:32.40	PB
7	Guemps Andreville	Haiti	34:38.55	
	Javier Guarin	Colombia	DNF	

=== Marathon ===
July 25

Rank	Name	Nationality	Time	Notes
1st place, gold medalist(s)	José Amado García	Guatemala	2:21:35	PB
2nd place, silver medalist(s)	Carlos Cordero	Mexico	2:22:06	
3rd place, bronze medalist(s)	Juan Carlos Cardona	Colombia	2:22:35	
4	Luis Rivera	Puerto Rico	2:23:00	
5	Alfredo Arevalo	Guatemala	2:25:55	
6	Procopio Franco	Mexico	2:28:54	
7	Hector Rivera	Puerto Rico	2:28:56	
8	Pamenos Ballantyne	Saint Vincent and the Grenadines	2:43:15	
9	William Bohke	United States Virgin Islands	2:57:56	

=== 110 meters hurdles ===
Heats – July 25
Wind:
Heat 1: +2.2 m/s, Heat 2: +1.6 m/s

Rank	Heat	Name	Nationality	Time	Notes
1	2	Ryan Brathwaite	Barbados	13.35	Q
2	1	Eric Keddo	Jamaica	13.51	Q
3	1	Paulo Villar	Colombia	13.56	Q
4	2	Héctor Cotto	Puerto Rico	13.81	Q
5	1	Shane Brathwaite	Barbados	13.87	Q
6	2	Hansle Parchment	Jamaica	13.88	Q, PB
7	2	Ronald Forbes	Cayman Islands	13.90	q
8	1	Dominique Desgrammont	Haiti	13.93	q
9	2	Carlos Jorge	Dominican Republic	14.09	
10	1	Renan Palma	El Salvador	14.41	
	2	Ronald Bennett	Honduras	DQ	

Final – July 25
Wind:
-0.1 m/s

Rank	Lane	Name	Nationality	Time	Notes
1st place, gold medalist(s)	6	Ryan Brathwaite	Barbados	13.39	
2nd place, silver medalist(s)	3	Eric Keddo	Jamaica	13.52	PB
3rd place, bronze medalist(s)	4	Héctor Cotto	Puerto Rico	13.71	
4	2	Dominique Desgrammont	Haiti	13.86	
5	7	Hansle Parchment	Jamaica	13.97	
6	8	Shane Brathwaite	Barbados	14.04	
7	1	Ronald Forbes	Cayman Islands	14.34	
8	5	Paulo Villar	Colombia	20.10	

=== 400 meters hurdles ===
Heats – July 25

Rank	Heat	Name	Nationality	Time	Notes
1	2	Javier Culson	Puerto Rico	49.89	Q
2	1	Félix Sánchez	Dominican Republic	50.19	Q
3	1	Roxroy Cato	Jamaica	50.27	Q
4	2	Leford Green	Jamaica	50.67	Q
5	1	Alie Beauvais	Haiti	51.12	Q
6	2	Winder Cuevas	Dominican Republic	51.18	Q
7	1	Jonathan Gibson	Panama	51.49	q, PB
8	2	Kenneth Medwood	Belize	51.70	q
9	2	Junior Hines	Cayman Islands	52.24	
10	1	Jonathan Williams	Belize	52.55	
11	2	Lurias Eugene	Haiti	52.61	
12	1	Allan Ayala	Guatemala	53.57	
13	1	Emmanuel Mayers	Trinidad and Tobago	55.38	
	1	Jamele Mason	Puerto Rico	DNF	
	2	Leslie Murray III	United States Virgin Islands	DNS	

Final – July 27

Rank	Lane	Name	Nationality	Time	Notes
1st place, gold medalist(s)	5	Leford Green	Jamaica	48.47	CR
2nd place, silver medalist(s)	6	Javier Culson	Puerto Rico	48.58	
3rd place, bronze medalist(s)	3	Roxroy Cato	Jamaica	49.62	
4	4	Félix Sánchez	Dominican Republic	50.08	
5	1	Kenneth Medwood	Belize	51.08	
6	2	Jonathan Gibson	Panama	51.36	PB
7	7	Winder Cuevas	Dominican Republic	51.49	
	8	Alie Beauvais	Haiti	DNF	

=== 3000 meters steeplechase ===
July 29

Rank	Name	Nationality	Time	Notes
1st place, gold medalist(s)	Alexander Greaux	Puerto Rico	8:56.47	
2nd place, silver medalist(s)	Josafat González	Mexico	8:57.98	
3rd place, bronze medalist(s)	Marvin Blanco	Venezuela	9:03.10	
4	Fernando Roman	Puerto Rico	9:03.34	PB

=== 4 × 100 meters relay ===
Heats – July 29

Rank	Heat	Nation	Competitors	Time	Notes
1	1	Jamaica	Kenroy Anderson, Jacques Harvey, Omar Douglas, Rasheed Dwyer	38.96	Q
2	1	Trinidad and Tobago	Rondel Sorrillo, Marc Burns, Marcus Duncan, Keston Bledman	39.36	Q
3	1	Saint Kitts and Nevis	Jason Rogers, Antoine Adams, Delwayne Delaney, Brijesh Lawrence	39.48	Q, NR
4	2	Netherlands Antilles	Kwidama Prince, Brian Mariano, Curtis Kock, Churandy Martina	39.67	Q
5	2	Puerto Rico	Héctor Cotto, Yavid Zackey, Luis López, Miguel López	39.79	Q
6	2	Dominican Republic	Enmanuel Brioso, Carlos Jorge, Irving Guerrero, Yoel Tapia	39.85	Q
7	2	Colombia	Isidro Montoya, Luis Nuñez, Álvaro Gómez, Daniel Grueso	39.96	q
8	2	Cayman Islands	Carl Morgan, Carlos Morgan, David Hamil, Junior Hines	40.70	q
9	1	Honduras	Josef Norales, Ronald Bennett, Pedro Suazo, Rolando Palacios	41.69	
	1	Antigua and Barbuda	Chevaughn Walsh, Shannon King, Brendan Christian, Richard Richardson	DQ	
	1	Bahamas	Jamal Forbes, Adrian Griffith, Brunell McKenzie, Jamial Rolle	DQ	
	2	United States Virgin Islands	Adrian Durant, Leon Hunt, David Walters, Tabarie Henry	DQ	

Final – July 29

Rank	Nation	Competitors	Time	Notes
1st place, gold medalist(s)	Trinidad and Tobago	Rondel Sorrillo, Marc Burns, Emmanuel Callender, Keston Bledman	38.24	CR
2nd place, silver medalist(s)	Jamaica	Kenroy Anderson, Oshane Bailey, Rasheed Dwyer, Lerone Clarke	38.78	
3rd place, bronze medalist(s)	Netherlands Antilles	Kwidama Prince, Brian Mariano, Curtis Kock, Churandy Martina	38.82	
4	Puerto Rico	Héctor Cotto, Yavid Zackey, Luis López, Miguel López	39.18	
5	Colombia	Isidro Montoya, Álvaro Gómez, Luis Nuñez, Daniel Grueso	39.20	NR
6	Dominican Republic	Enmanuel Brioso, Winder Cuevas, Irving Guerrero, Yoel Tapia	39.42	
7	Saint Kitts and Nevis	Jason Rogers, Antoine Adams, Delwayne Delaney, Brijesh Lawrence	39.43	NR
	Cayman Islands		DNS	

=== 4 × 400 meters relay ===
July 30

Rank	Nation	Competitors	Time	Notes
1st place, gold medalist(s)	Jamaica	Oral Thompson, Leford Green, Roxroy Cato, Allodin Fothergill	3:01.68	CR
2nd place, silver medalist(s)	Bahamas	Andretti Bain, Michael Mathieu, La'Sean Pickstock, Demetrius Pinder	3:01.82	SB
3rd place, bronze medalist(s)	Trinidad and Tobago	Zwede Hewitt, Lalonde Gordon, Gavyn Nero, Jarrin Solomon	3:04.07	SB
4	Dominican Republic	Winder Cuevas, Gustavo Cuesta, Tayron Reyes, Yoel Tapia	3:04.68	
5	Puerto Rico	Jamele Mason, Javier Culson, Juan Vega, Héctor Carrasquillo	3:04.98	SB
6	Venezuela	Freddy Mezones, Alberto Aguilar, Albert Bravo, Omar Longart	3:07.98	
7	Costa Rica	Victor Cantillano, Nery Brenes, Arnoldo Monge, Gary Robinson	3:10.21	
	Haiti		DNS	

=== 20 kilometers walk ===
July 26

Rank	Name	Nationality	Time	Penalties	Notes
1st place, gold medalist(s)	Eder Sánchez	Mexico	1:22:32	0	CR
2nd place, silver medalist(s)	Luis Fernando López	Colombia	1:22:55	2	
3rd place, bronze medalist(s)	Gustavo Restrepo	Colombia	1:22:56	2	PB
4	Victor Mendoza	El Salvador	1:27:52	0	
5	Pedro Daniel Gómez	Mexico	1:27:53	1	
6	Allan Segura	Costa Rica	1:28:49	0	
7	Jassir Cabrera	Panama	1:34:05	1	PB
8	Noel Santini	Puerto Rico	1:35:48	0	
	Walter Sandoval	El Salvador	DQ	3	

=== High jump ===
July 30

Rank	Athlete	Nationality	1.95	2.00	2.05	2.10	2.13	2.16	2.19	2.22	2.25	2.28	2.31	Result	Notes
1st place, gold medalist(s)	Donald Thomas	Bahamas	–	–	–	–	–	o	o	xo	xo	o	xxx	2.28	
2nd place, silver medalist(s)	Trevor Barry	Bahamas	–	–	–	o	–	o	o	xxo	xxo	xo	xxx	2.28	
3rd place, bronze medalist(s)	Wanner Miller	Colombia	–	–	–	o	o	o	xxo	xxx				2.19	
4	Henderson Dottin	Barbados	–	o	o	o	o	xxx						2.13	
4	Darrell Garwood	Jamaica	o	–	o	o	o	xxx						2.13	PB
6	Thorrold Murray	Barbados	–	o	o	o	xxx							2.10	
7	Jeffrey Burgos	Puerto Rico	–	xo	o	o	xxx							2.10	
7	James Grayman	Antigua and Barbuda	–	–	xo	o	–	xxx						2.10	
9	Brendan Williams	Dominica	–	xo	o	o	xxx							2.10	
10	Abdiel Ruiz	Puerto Rico	–	o	o	xxo	xxx							2.10	
11	Keron Stoute	British Virgin Islands	xo	xo	xo	xxx								2.05	
12	Marlon Colorado	El Salvador	o	xxo	xxo	xxx								2.05	
	Jorge Rouco	Mexico	–	–	xxx									NM	
	Albert Bravo	Venezuela	–	x										DNF	

=== Pole vault ===
July 27

Rank	Athlete	Nationality	4.60	4.70	4.80	4.90	5.00	5.10	5.20	5.30	5.35	5.40	5.45	5.60	5.80	Result	Notes
1st place, gold medalist(s)	Geovanni Lanaro	Mexico	–	–	–	–	–	–	o	o	o	o	–	xo	xxx	5.60	CR
2nd place, silver medalist(s)	Brandon Estrada	Puerto Rico	–	–	–	–	–	o	o	o	x–	o	xxx			5.40	
3rd place, bronze medalist(s)	Christian Sanchez	Mexico	–	–	–	–	–	xo	xo	xxx						5.20	
4	Jorge Montes	Dominican Republic	–	–	o	xo	xo	o	xxx							5.10	PB
5	César González	Venezuela	–	–	o	o	xxx									4.90	
6	Yeisel Cintrón	Puerto Rico	o	–	xxo	xxx										4.80	
7	Rick Valcin	Saint Lucia	xxo	xxx												4.60	
	Jabari Ennis	Jamaica	–	–	xx–	x										NM	

=== Long jump ===
July 26

Rank	Athlete	Nationality	#1	#2	#3	#4	#5	#6	Result	Notes
1st place, gold medalist(s)	Tyrone Smith	Bermuda	7.70	7.58	7.73	7.87	7.91	8.22	8.22	PB
2nd place, silver medalist(s)	Muhammad Halim	United States Virgin Islands	7.23	7.79	7.59	7.70	X	X	7.79	
3rd place, bronze medalist(s)	Carlos Morgan	Cayman Islands	7.72	X	X	X	X	X	7.72	
4	Rudon Bastian	Bahamas	7.15	X	7.43	7.28	7.55	7.70	7.70	
5	Marcos Amalbert	Puerto Rico	7.58	7.50	7.50	X	X	7.47	7.58	
6	Kyron Blaise	Trinidad and Tobago	X	7.22	7.47	7.40	X	7.41	7.47	
7	Luis Rivera	Mexico	7.43	7.30	6.77w	7.19w	7.40	7.20	7.43	
8	Ramon Cooper	Jamaica	7.41	X	7.32	X	6.73	–	7.41	PB
9	Carl Morgan	Cayman Islands	7.31w	7.23	6.60				7.31w	
10	Clayton Latham	Saint Vincent and the Grenadines	7.15	6.99	7.07				7.15	
11	Eddy Florian	Dominican Republic	7.03	X	6.89				7.03	
12	Vicente Rios	Mexico	X	X	6.90				6.90	
13	Kenardo Tyrell	Jamaica	6.83	6.67	6.61				6.83	
	Leon Hunt	United States Virgin Islands	X	X	X				NM	

=== Triple jump ===
July 29

Rank	Athlete	Nationality	#1	#2	#3	#4	#5	#6	Result	Notes
1st place, gold medalist(s)	Leevan Sands	Bahamas	X	16.74	16.93	X	17.01	17.21	17.21	
2nd place, silver medalist(s)	Randy Lewis	Grenada	17.20	X	16.27	–	–	X	17.20	
3rd place, bronze medalist(s)	Samyr Lainé	Haiti	16.56	16.39	X	16.39	17.01	15.26	17.01	
4	Wilbert Walker	Jamaica	X	15.07	16.34	16.65	X	16.43	16.65	
5	Muhammad Halim	United States Virgin Islands	15.98	16.05	16.18	16.23	16.36	X	16.36	
6	Kyron Blaise	Trinidad and Tobago	15.42	15.80	14.24	15.72	15.81	16.01	16.01	
7	Devon Bond	Guyana	X	15.82	14.36	X	15.34	X	15.82	
8	Christophe Hercules	Trinidad and Tobago	15.44	15.34	15.51	–	15.61	15.57	15.61	
9	Jair David Cadenas	Mexico	15.11	X	X				15.11	
10	Michael Thompson	Panama	15.00	14.94	X				15.00	
11	Ayata Joseph	Antigua and Barbuda	X	X	14.95				14.95	
12	Juan Nájera	Guatemala	X	14.90	13.57				14.90	
	Eddy Florian	Dominican Republic							DNS	

=== Shot put ===
July 25

Rank	Athlete	Nationality	#1	#2	#3	#4	#5	#6	Result	Notes
1st place, gold medalist(s)	Dorian Scott	Jamaica	X	18.36	18.77	X	18.92	X	18.92	
2nd place, silver medalist(s)	O'Dayne Richards	Jamaica	17.06	18.74	X	X	X	X	18.74	PB
3rd place, bronze medalist(s)	Eder Moreno	Colombia	17.88	X	18.29	18.45	18.16	18.22	18.45	
4	Mario Cota	Mexico	17.35	18.26	18.01	X	18.36	17.81	18.36	
5	Yojer Medina	Venezuela	16.33	X	X	X	X	X	16.33	
6	Carlos Martínez	Puerto Rico	X	16.20	X	X	X	X	16.20	
7	Juan Jaiman	Puerto Rico	14.63	15.92	15.70	X	X	X	15.92	

=== Discus throw ===
July 27

Rank	Athlete	Nationality	#1	#2	#3	#4	#5	#6	Result	Notes
1st place, gold medalist(s)	Jason Morgan	Jamaica	54.38	59.43	55.63	55.71	X	X	59.43	
2nd place, silver medalist(s)	Jesus Parejo	Venezuela	52.29	54.44	54.88	54.81	X	X	54.88	
3rd place, bronze medalist(s)	Mario Cota	Mexico	53.29	51.58	54.16	X	53.69	54.70	54.70	
4	O'Dayne Richards	Jamaica	50.20	51.23	49.58	50.57	52.01	54.10	54.10	
5	Juan Infante	Dominican Republic	47.48	52.89	52.40	52.03	51.47	51.22	52.89	
6	Alfredo Romero	Puerto Rico	47.05	52.10	51.39	51.18	51.32	50.17	52.10	
7	Alan Moreno	Mexico	49.08	X	49.33	49.54	47.34	49.25	49.54	
8	Eric Mathias	British Virgin Islands	46.75	X	47.80	X	X	X	47.80	
9	Kyle Francis	British Virgin Islands	X	X	37.68				37.68	
	Adonso Shallow	Saint Vincent and the Grenadines							DNS	

=== Hammer throw ===
July 25

Rank	Athlete	Nationality	#1	#2	#3	#4	#5	#6	Result	Notes
1st place, gold medalist(s)	Aldo Bello	Venezuela	63.86	63.96	62.74	63.75	63.38	65.10	65.10	
2nd place, silver medalist(s)	Jean Rosario	Puerto Rico	60.84	58.79	X	59.74	62.27	63.31	63.31	
3rd place, bronze medalist(s)	Pedro Muñoz	Venezuela	60.13	62.93	62.12	X	63.03	X	63.03	
4	Roberto Sawyers	Costa Rica	56.15	62.08	62.03	X	60.03	17.60	62.08	
5	Raul Rivera	Guatemala	61.40	61.81	X	59.50	61.05	59.88	61.81	
6	Santiago Loera	Mexico	56.62	57.71	56.27	56.36	55.71	59.88	57.71	
7	Wilfredo de Jesus	Puerto Rico	54.89	X	57.50	57.05	X	X	57.50	
8	Michael Letterlough	Cayman Islands	55.73	53.81	55.22	X	56.34	57.02	57.02	

=== Javelin throw ===
July 25

Rank	Athlete	Nationality	#1	#2	#3	#4	#5	#6	Result	Notes
1st place, gold medalist(s)	Arley Ibargüen	Colombia	67.90	75.38	73.47	78.93	75.89	77.49	78.93	
2nd place, silver medalist(s)	Dairon Marquez	Colombia	70.53	75.69	76.31	75.04	X	72.11	76.31	
3rd place, bronze medalist(s)	Juan José Mendez	Mexico	66.39	66.78	63.05	68.38	76.03	68.93	76.03	
4	Albert Reynolds	Saint Lucia	67.13	69.52	68.54	65.73	X	X	69.52	PB
5	José Lagunes	Mexico	64.97	64.53	60.42	63.51	64.40	68.15	68.15	
6	Jorge Martínez	Puerto Rico	64.53	63.87	X	64.93	60.41	X	64.93	
7	Kurt Felix	Grenada	64.54	62.87	62.00	–	–	–	64.54	
8	Justin Cummins	Barbados	59.35	X	63.66	63.45	61.02	X	63.66	
9	Rigoberto Calderón	Nicaragua	X	60.31	63.34				63.34	
10	Emmanuel Stewart	Trinidad and Tobago	60.99	61.20	60.96				61.20	
11	Luis Taracena	Guatemala	54.05	59.16	59.94				59.94	
12	Carlos Prado	Guatemala	52.90	52.22	50.47				52.90	
13	Omar Jones	British Virgin Islands	52.58	X	51.77				52.58	
	Felipe Ortiz	Puerto Rico	X	–	–				DNF	

=== Decathlon ===
July 29–30

The highest mark recorded in each event is highlighted in yellow

Rank	Athlete	Nationality	100m	LJ	SP	HJ	400m	110m H	DT	PV	JT	1500m	Points	Notes
1st place, gold medalist(s)	Maurice Smith	Jamaica	10.82	7.32	15.76	1.94	49.20	14.64	48.18	4.60	58.88	4:46.14	8109	
2nd place, silver medalist(s)	Steven Marrero	Puerto Rico	11.30	6.73	14.23	1.91	49.60	16.27	48.26	4.80	53.92	4:48.12	7506	PB
3rd place, bronze medalist(s)	Marcos Sanchez	Puerto Rico	11.00	6.81	14.19	1.94	49.92	15.61	40.51	4.30	57.54	5:07.16	7311	
4	Jhonatan Davis	Venezuela	11.26	6.64	13.69	1.91	51.35	14.99	44.44	3.70	59.26	4:58.72	7153	
5	Kurt Felix	Grenada	11.37	7.26	11.62	2.03	51.16	15.87	36.00	3.60	68.05	4:51.05	7144	
6	Jorge Rivera	Mexico	11.63	6.75	11.64	2.00	51.99	16.16	35.23	4.20	39.70	4:49.46	6609	
7	Leandro Lopez	Dominican Republic	11.43	6.37	11.69	1.70	50.86	16.42	34.19	3.80	55.87	4:53.94	6408	
	Darvin Colón	Honduras	DNS	–	–	–	–	–	–	–	–	–	DNS	

== Women's results ==
=== 100 meters ===
Heats – July 25
Wind:
Heat 1: +2.3 m/s, Heat 2: +1.4 m/s, Heat 3: +1.8 m/s

Rank	Heat	Name	Nationality	Time	Notes
1	1	Tahesia Harrigan	British Virgin Islands	11.11	Q
2	2	Ayanna Hutchinson	Trinidad and Tobago	11.42	Q
3	2	Yomara Hinestroza	Colombia	11.44	Q, PB
4	3	Alison George	Grenada	11.45	Q
5	1	María Idrobo	Colombia	11.46	Q
6	3	Carol Rodríguez	Puerto Rico	11.51	Q
7	1	Audria Segree	Jamaica	11.54	q
8	3	Courtney Patterson	United States Virgin Islands	11.55	q
9	2	Erika Rivera	Puerto Rico	11.57	
10	1	Shakera Reece	Barbados	11.58	
11	2	Tameka Williams	Saint Kitts and Nevis	11.66	
12	1	Tanika Liburd	Saint Kitts and Nevis	11.73	
13	3	Karene King	United States Virgin Islands	11.84	PB
14	1	Marleny Mejía	Dominican Republic	11.91	
15	3	Reyare Thomas	Trinidad and Tobago	12.00	
16	3	Kaina Martinez	Belize	12.11	
17	2	Shanna Thomas	Jamaica	12.15	
18	2	Tracy Joseph	Costa Rica	12.37	
19	1	Mariela Leal	Costa Rica	12.46	
	2	Tricia Flores	Belize	DNS	
	3	Jeimy Bernárdez	Honduras	DNS	

Final – July 25
Wind:
0.0 m/s

Rank	Lane	Name	Nationality	Time	Notes
1st place, gold medalist(s)	6	Tahesia Harrigan	British Virgin Islands	11.19	
2nd place, silver medalist(s)	3	Ayanna Hutchinson	Trinidad and Tobago	11.47	
3rd place, bronze medalist(s)	4	Yomara Hinestroza	Colombia	11.51	PB
4	8	Carol Rodríguez	Puerto Rico	11.56	
5	2	Courtney Patterson	United States Virgin Islands	11.59	
6	5	Alison George	Grenada	11.62	
7	7	María Idrobo	Colombia	11.67	
8	1	Audria Segree	Jamaica	11.83	

=== 200 meters ===
Heats – July 25
Wind:
Heat 1: +0.9 m/s, Heat 2: +1.1 m/s

Rank	Heat	Name	Nationality	Time	Notes
1	2	Cydonie Mothersille	Cayman Islands	22.69	Q, CR
2	1	Darlenis Obregón	Colombia	23.39	Q
3	2	Carol Rodríguez	Puerto Rico	23.45	Q
4	2	Audria Segree	Jamaica	23.79	Q
5	2	Aliann Pompey	Guyana	23.84	q
6	2	Tameka Williams	Saint Kitts and Nevis	23.93	q
7	1	Erika Rivera	Puerto Rico	24.06	Q
8	1	Karene King	British Virgin Islands	24.31	Q
9	1	Kaina Martinez	Belize	25.17	
10	2	Shantelly Scott	Costa Rica	26.22	
	1	Alejandra Cherizola	Mexico	DNF	
	1	Trish Bartholomew	Grenada	DNS	

Final – July 27
Wind:
-0.9 m/s

Rank	Lane	Name	Nationality	Time	Notes
1st place, gold medalist(s)	4	Cydonie Mothersille	Cayman Islands	22.91	
2nd place, silver medalist(s)	3	Carol Rodríguez	Puerto Rico	23.37	
3rd place, bronze medalist(s)	6	Darlenis Obregón	Colombia	23.76	
4	5	Erika Rivera	Puerto Rico	23.78	
5	7	Audria Segree	Jamaica	24.01	
6	2	Aliann Pompey	Guyana	24.27	
7	1	Tameka Williams	Saint Kitts and Nevis	24.48	
8	1	Karene King	British Virgin Islands	24.76	

=== 400 meters ===
Heats – July 25

Rank	Heat	Name	Nationality	Time	Notes
1	2	Tiandra Ponteen	Saint Kitts and Nevis	52.01	Q
2	2	Christine Amertil	Bahamas	52.41	Q
3	1	Aliann Pompey	Guyana	52.43	Q
4	1	Clora Williams	Jamaica	52.68	Q
5	2	Norma González	Colombia	53.13	Q
6	2	Raysa Sánchez	Dominican Republic	53.72	q, PB
7	1	Trish Bartholomew	Grenada	53.87	Q
8	1	Sasha Rolle	Bahamas	53.93	q
9	1	Yennifer Padilla	Colombia	54.44	
10	2	Nallely Vela	Mexico	54.73	
11	1	Sharolyn Scott	Costa Rica	56.14	
12	1	Dominique Maloney	British Virgin Islands	57.51	
	2	Anastasia Le-Roy	Jamaica	DNF	
	2	Kathi Cuadra	Nicaragua	DNS	

Final – July 26

Rank	Lane	Name	Nationality	Time	Notes
1st place, gold medalist(s)	6	Christine Amertil	Bahamas	52.16	SB
2nd place, silver medalist(s)	5	Aliann Pompey	Guyana	52.33	
3rd place, bronze medalist(s)	4	Tiandra Ponteen	Saint Kitts and Nevis	52.75	
4	3	Clora Williams	Jamaica	53.04	
5	7	Trish Bartholomew	Grenada	53.41	
6	1	Raysa Sánchez	Dominican Republic	53.72	PB
7	8	Norma González	Colombia	54.06	
8	2	Sasha Rolle	Bahamas	54.48	

=== 800 meters ===
July 29

Rank	Name	Nationality	Time	Notes
1st place, gold medalist(s)	Rosibel García	Colombia	2:03.77	
2nd place, silver medalist(s)	Andrea Ferris	Panama	2:04.16	
3rd place, bronze medalist(s)	Marian Burnett	Guyana	2:04.45	
4	Melissa de Leon	Trinidad and Tobago	2:04.98	
5	Gabriela Medina	Mexico	2:07.57	
6	Belissa Del Valle	Puerto Rico	2:12.15	
	Evamari Guzman	Puerto Rico	DNS	

=== 1500 meters ===
July 26

Rank	Name	Nationality	Time	Notes
1st place, gold medalist(s)	Rosibel García	Colombia	4:21.17	
2nd place, silver medalist(s)	Pilar McShine	Trinidad and Tobago	4:21.66	
3rd place, bronze medalist(s)	Beverly Ramos	Puerto Rico	4:22.02	
4	Marian Burnett	Guyana	4:22.56	
5	Andrea Ferris	Panama	4:25.21	
6	Anayelli Navarro	Mexico	4:26.05	
7	Gladys Landaverde	El Salvador	4:28.81	
8	Tanice Barnett	Jamaica	4:31.23	PB
9	Lilliani Méndez	Puerto Rico	4:32.39	
10	Dulce María Rodríguez	Mexico	4:34.70	
11	Sonny García	Dominican Republic	4:36.22	

=== 5000 meters ===
July 29

Rank	Name	Nationality	Time	Notes
1st place, gold medalist(s)	Beverly Ramos	Puerto Rico	16:09.82	CR
2nd place, silver medalist(s)	Yolanda Caballero	Colombia	16:14.75	
3rd place, bronze medalist(s)	Adriana Fernández	Mexico	16:28.65	
4	María Montilla	Venezuela	16:50.25	PB
5	Andreina de la Rosa	Dominican Republic	17:27.52	
6	María Teresa Ferris	Panama	17:43.87	PB
	Racheal Marchand	Puerto Rico	DQ	
	Dulce María Rodríguez	Mexico	DNF	

=== 10,000 meters ===
July 25

Rank	Name	Nationality	Time	Notes
1st place, gold medalist(s)	Yolanda Caballero	Colombia	34:50.58	
2nd place, silver medalist(s)	María Elena Valencia	Mexico	34:52.66	SB
3rd place, bronze medalist(s)	Madai Perez	Mexico	34:57.05	
4	María Montilla	Venezuela	35:29.52	
5	Andreina de la Rosa	Dominican Republic	36:06.70	
5	Zenaida Maldonado	Puerto Rico	37:27.11	
	Racheal Marchand	Puerto Rico	DQ	

=== Marathon ===
July 25

Rank	Name	Nationality	Time	Notes
1st place, gold medalist(s)	Marisol Romero	Mexico	2:44:30	
2nd place, silver medalist(s)	Gabriela Traña	Costa Rica	2:46:22	
3rd place, bronze medalist(s)	Paula Apolonio	Mexico	2:48:46	
4	María del Pilar Díaz	Puerto Rico	2:56:38	PB
5	Yolanda Mercado	Puerto Rico	2:56:57	SB
	Ruth Ann David	United States Virgin Islands	DNS	

=== 100 meters hurdles ===
Heats – July 25
Wind:
Heat 1: +0.2 m/s, Heat 2: 0.0 m/s

Rank	Heat	Name	Nationality	Time	Notes
1	1	Aleesha Barber	Trinidad and Tobago	13.10	Q
3	1	Eliecit Palacios	Colombia	13.19	Q, SB
3	2	Briggite Merlano	Colombia	13.23	Q
4	2	Andrea Bliss	Jamaica	13.25	Q
5	1	Indira Spence	Jamaica	13.41	Q
6	1	Shantia Moss	Dominican Republic	13.63	q
7	2	LaVonne Idlette	Dominican Republic	13.80	Q
8	1	Violeta Avila	Mexico	14.01	q
9	2	Alyssa Costas	Puerto Rico	14.25	
10	2	Jeimy Bernárdez	Honduras	14.27	PB
11	1	Litzy Vazquez	Puerto Rico	14.33	
12	2	Wanetta Kirby	United States Virgin Islands	14.38	

Final – July 25
Wind:
+0.1 m/s

Rank	Lane	Name	Nationality	Time	Notes
1st place, gold medalist(s)	5	Aleesha Barber	Trinidad and Tobago	13.09	
2nd place, silver medalist(s)	4	Eliecit Palacios	Colombia	13.20	SB
3rd place, bronze medalist(s)	3	Andrea Bliss	Jamaica	13.20	
4	6	Briggite Merlano	Colombia	13.21	
5	8	Indira Spence	Jamaica	13.22	
6	2	Shantia Moss	Dominican Republic	13.37	
7	7	LaVonne Idlette	Dominican Republic	13.83	
8	1	Violeta Avila	Mexico	14.24	

=== 400 meters hurdles ===
Heats – July 26

Rank	Heat	Name	Nationality	Time	Notes
1	1	Nickiesha Wilson	Jamaica	56.98	Q
2	1	Janeil Bellille	Trinidad and Tobago	58.11	Q
3	2	Yolanda Osana	Dominican Republic	58.14	Q
4	2	Nikita Tracey	Jamaica	58.58	Q
5	1	Sharolyn Scott	Costa Rica	59.05	Q, PB
6	1	Karla Dueňas	Mexico	59.16	q
7	2	Kathyenid Rivera	Puerto Rico	1:00.52	q
8	2	Jessica Aguilera	Nicaragua	1:05.54	
	2	Zudikey Rodríguez	Mexico	DQ	
	1	Michelle Cumberbach	Bahamas	DNS	

Final – July 27

Rank	Lane	Name	Nationality	Time	Notes
1st place, gold medalist(s)	6	Nickiesha Wilson	Jamaica	55.40	
2nd place, silver medalist(s)	5	Janeil Bellille	Trinidad and Tobago	56.81	PB
3rd place, bronze medalist(s)	3	Yolanda Osana	Dominican Republic	57.73	
4	7	Nikita Tracey	Jamaica	58.54	
5	8	Sharolyn Scott	Costa Rica	58.89	PB
6	1	Karla Dueňas	Mexico	58.94	
7	2	Kathyenid Rivera	Puerto Rico	59.29	
	4	Zudikey Rodríguez	Mexico	DQ	

=== 3000 meters steeplechase ===
July 30

Rank	Name	Nationality	Time	Notes
1st place, gold medalist(s)	Beverly Ramos	Puerto Rico	9:59.03	PB
2nd place, silver medalist(s)	Ángela Figueroa	Colombia	10:18.28	
3rd place, bronze medalist(s)	Sandra López Reyes	Mexico	10:18.88	PB
4	Evonne Marroquín	Guatemala	10:51.55	PB
5	Erika Méndez	Puerto Rico	11:04.53	
6	Sonny García	Dominican Republic	11:33.67	

=== 4 × 100 meters relay ===
July 29

Rank	Nation	Competitors	Time	Notes
1st place, gold medalist(s)	Colombia	Eliecit Palacios, María Idrobo, Darlenis Obregón, Yomara Hinestroza	43.63	
2nd place, silver medalist(s)	Jamaica	Audria Segree, Jovanee Jarrett, Andrea Bliss, Anastasia Le-Roy	44.27	SB
3rd place, bronze medalist(s)	Saint Kitts and Nevis	Tanika Liburd, Tameka Williams, Tiandra Ponteen, Virgil Hodgge	44.43	
4	Dominican Republic	Mariely Sánchez, Fany Chalas, Marleny Mejía, María Rodríguez	44.75	NR
5	Trinidad and Tobago	Sasha Springer Jones, Ayanna Hutchinson, Reyare Thomas, Aleesha Barber	45.01	
6	Costa Rica	Mariela Leal, Shantelly Scott, Tracy Joseph, Sharolyn Scott	47.31	NR
	Puerto Rico	Beatriz Cruz, Celiangeli Morales, Erika Rivera, Carol Rodríguez	DQ	

=== 4 × 400 meters relay ===
July 30

Rank	Nation	Competitors	Time	Notes
1st place, gold medalist(s)	Jamaica	Davita Prendgast, Nikita Tracey, Dominique Blake, Clora Williams	3:32.31	SB
2nd place, silver medalist(s)	Colombia	Yennifer Padilla, María Idrobo, Darlenis Obregón, Norma Gonzalez	3:33.03	SB
3rd place, bronze medalist(s)	Trinidad and Tobago	Aleesha Barber, Janeil Bellille, Melissa de Leon, Afija Walker	3:35.66	SB
4	Dominican Republic	Raysa Sánchez, Diana Taylor, Margarita Manzueta, Yolanda Osana	3:36.40	NR
5	Puerto Rico	Stephanie Rosado, Beatriz Cruz, Kathyenid Rivera, Genoiska Cancel	3:44.00	SB
	Mexico	Karla Dueñas, Nallely Vela, Gabriela Medina, Zudikey Rodríguez	DQ	
	British Virgin Islands		DNS	

=== 20 kilometers walk ===
July 24

Rank	Name	Nationality	Time	Penalties	Notes
1st place, gold medalist(s)	Sandra Galvis	Colombia	1:38:27	0	PB
2nd place, silver medalist(s)	Milangela Rosales	Venezuela	1:40:16	1	PB
3rd place, bronze medalist(s)	Maria Sanchez Guerrero	Mexico	1:41:56	1	PB
4	Wilane Cuevas	Puerto Rico	1:55:42	0	
	Veronica Colindres	El Salvador	DQ	3	
	María Sanchez Gomez	Mexico	DQ	3	

=== High jump ===
July 26

Rank	Athlete	Nationality	1.55	1.60	1.65	1.70	1.73	1.76	1.79	1.82	1.85	1.88	1.91	1.94	2.00	Result	Notes
1st place, gold medalist(s)	Levern Spencer	Saint Lucia	–	–	–	–	–	–	–	–	o	–	o	o	xx–	1.94	
2nd place, silver medalist(s)	Sheree Francis	Jamaica	–	–	–	–	o	o	o	o	o	o	xo	xxx		1.91	
3rd place, bronze medalist(s)	María Rifka	Mexico	–	–	–	o	–	o	o	o	o	o	xxo	xxx		1.91	
4	Catherine Nina	Panama	–	–	xo	o	o	o	xxo	xxo	xxx					1.82	PB
5	Paola Fuentes	Mexico	–	–	–	o	xo	o	xxx							1.76	
6	Alejandra Gomez	Costa Rica	–	o	o	o	o	xxx								1.73	
7	Noami Santos	Puerto Rico	o	o	xxo	o	xxx									1.70	
8	Alysbeth Felix	Puerto Rico	–	o	o	xo	xxx									1.70	

=== Pole vault ===
July 25

Rank	Athlete	Nationality	3.00	3.10	3.20	3.60	3.65	3.70	3.75	3.80	3.90	4.00	4.10	4.20	4.30	Result	Notes
1st place, gold medalist(s)	Keisa Monterola	Venezuela	–	–	–	–	–	–	–	o	o	o	o	o	xxx	4.20	CR
2nd place, silver medalist(s)	Andrea Zambrana	Puerto Rico	–	–	–	xo	–	o	–	xo	o	xxx				3.90	PB
3rd place, bronze medalist(s)	Milena Agudelo	Colombia	–	–	–	–	–	xo	–	xo	xo	xxx				3.90	
4	Carmen Díaz	Puerto Rico	–	–	–	xo	xxo	–	xxx							3.65	
5	María José Rodas	Guatemala	o	xo	xxx											3.10	
	Cecilia Villar	Mexico	–	–	–	xxx										NM	

=== Long jump ===
July 30

Rank	Athlete	Nationality	#1	#2	#3	#4	#5	#6	Result	Notes
1st place, gold medalist(s)	Rhonda Watkins	Trinidad and Tobago	6.55	6.67	6.18	5.52	X	6.44	6.67	CR
2nd place, silver medalist(s)	Jovanee Jarrett	Jamaica	6.42	6.52	6.31	X	6.48	6.16	6.52	
3rd place, bronze medalist(s)	Bianca Stuart	Bahamas	6.50	X	X	6.21	X	X	6.50	
4	Caterine Ibargüen	Colombia	6.19	X	X	6.29	X	6.29	6.29	
5	Tanika Liburd	Saint Kitts and Nevis	5.79	6.20	5.97	6.18	6.25	4.20	6.25	
6	Arantxa King	Bermuda	X	6.04	6.06	5.98	X	X	6.06	
7	Merukschalem Eduarda	Netherlands Antilles	5.92	X	X	X	5.95	6.02	6.02	
8	Ana José	Dominican Republic	5.72	5.91	5.82	5.59	X	5.78	5.91	
9	Aide Villareal	Mexico	5.88	X	5.72				5.88	
10	Yosiri Urrutia	Colombia	X	X	5.84				5.84	
11	Estefany Cruz	Guatemala	5.65	5.82	5.69				5.82	SB
12	Tricia Flores	Belize	5.66	5.78	5.61				5.78	
13	Munich Tovar Paiva	Venezuela	5.68	5.71	X				5.71	
14	Fabiola Taylor	Dominican Republic	5.49	5.20	5.57				5.57	
15	Kaina Martínez	Belize	X	5.56	X				5.56	
16	Lorina Fish	Haiti	X	X	4.93				4.93	
	Wanetta Kirby	United States Virgin Islands	X	X	X				NM	

=== Triple jump ===
July 27

Rank	Athlete	Nationality	#1	#2	#3	#4	#5	#6	Result	Notes
1st place, gold medalist(s)	Kimberly Williams	Jamaica	13.77	12.53	14.09	13.97	14.23	X	14.23	PB
2nd place, silver medalist(s)	Caterine Ibargüen	Colombia	13.83	13.78	X	13.99	14.10	X	14.10	
3rd place, bronze medalist(s)	Ayanna Alexander	Trinidad and Tobago	13.38	13.64	13.50	13.47	13.44	13.53	13.64	
4	Ana José	Dominican Republic	X	13.27	13.04	13.34	13.61	13.52	13.61	
5	Pascale Delauney	Haiti	12.90	13.06	12.65	12.23	X	12.82	13.06	PB
6	Aide Villareal	Mexico	12.91	12.83	X	12.93	X	X	12.93	
7	Estefany Cruz	Guatemala	X	12.65	12.78	12.84	X	X	12.84	
8	Munich Tovar Paiva	Venezuela	12.17	12.67	12.70	12.60	12.48	X	12.70	
9	Latroya Darrell	Bermuda	X	X	12.27				12.27	

=== Shot put ===
July 26

Rank	Athlete	Nationality	#1	#2	#3	#4	#5	#6	Result	Notes
1st place, gold medalist(s)	Cleopatra Borel-Brown	Trinidad and Tobago	18.76	18.64	18.63	18.37	18.35	X	18.76	
2nd place, silver medalist(s)	Zara Northover	Jamaica	X	15.74	17.04	15.96	16.73	16.26	17.04	PB
3rd place, bronze medalist(s)	Annie Alexander	Trinidad and Tobago	15.41	15.83	16.01	16.61	16.76	X	16.76	
4	Keisha Walkes	Barbados	15.50	14.77	X	15.27	X	15.03	15.50	
5	Margarita Bernardo	Dominican Republic	X	14.61	15.39	X	14.69	14.26	15.39	
6	Nadia Alexander	Jamaica	15.18	X	X	X	X	X	15.18	
7	Doroty Lopez	Guatemala	13.30	X	12.90	13.48	13.39	X	13.48	SB
8	Melissa Alfred	Dominica	9.37	11.95	X	12.19	12.51	12.25	12.51	
9	Silvia Piñar	Costa Rica	10.62	10.38	11.12				11.12	

=== Discus throw ===
July 29

Rank	Athlete	Nationality	#1	#2	#3	#4	#5	#6	Result	Notes
1st place, gold medalist(s)	María Cubillán	Venezuela	48.16	X	51.39	50.75	52.21	48.98	52.21	
2nd place, silver medalist(s)	Annie Alexander	Trinidad and Tobago	48.18	48.28	X	51.03	X	X	51.03	
3rd place, bronze medalist(s)	Paulina Flores	Mexico	X	48.42	48.31	X	49.57	49.35	49.57	
4	Brittnie Borrero	Puerto Rico	48.57	X	X	49.35	X	X	49.35	
5	Irais Estrada	Mexico	44.56	44.32	48.64	X	46.31	X	48.64	
6	Aixa Middleton	Panama	46.84	46.43	45.62	44.24	42.60	X	46.84	
7	Nancy de la Cruz	Dominican Republic	45.57	42.82	45.05	41.81	X	45.99	45.99	
8	Doroty Lopez	Guatemala	45.37	X	43.99	X	44.97	X	45.37	
9	Melissa Alfred	Dominica	40.12	X	X				40.12	

=== Hammer throw ===
July 24

Rank	Athlete	Nationality	#1	#2	#3	#4	#5	#6	Result	Notes
1st place, gold medalist(s)	Ely Moreno	Colombia	X	59.54	63.07	66.98	63.60	66.28	66.98	
2nd place, silver medalist(s)	Rosa Rodríguez	Venezuela	64.16	63.28	X	63.31	X	63.40	64.16	
3rd place, bronze medalist(s)	Natalie Grant	Jamaica	56.80	56.96	X	59.93	58.28	X	59.93	
4	Sharon Ayala	Mexico	54.81	X	56.88	X	X	58.84	58.84	
5	Norimar Llanos	Puerto Rico	47.83	X	45.46	49.57	50.26	49.29	50.26	
6	Reyna Campoy	Mexico	X	X	X	49.77	X	X	49.77	
7	Rosita de Leon	Guatemala	47.87	45.71	X	45.40	X	43.29	47.87	SB
8	Viviana Abarca	Costa Rica	45.48	44.74	45.18	39.98	46.89	X	46.89	

=== Javelin throw ===
July 27

Rank	Athlete	Nationality	#1	#2	#3	#4	#5	#6	Result	Notes
1st place, gold medalist(s)	Kateema Riettie	Jamaica	47.62	50.56	49.88	51.23	53.77	X	53.77	
2nd place, silver medalist(s)	Fresa Nuñez	Dominican Republic	49.30	48.09	50.23	48.57	50.26	52.96	52.96	
3rd place, bronze medalist(s)	María Lucelly Murillo	Colombia	49.39	X	49.93	51.29	47.78	50.69	51.29	
4	Laverne Eve	Bahamas	45.62	47.33	47.74	50.43	49.77	51.02	51.02	
5	Coraly Ortiz	Puerto Rico	45.14	45.06	45.27	45.62	47.31	46.08	47.31	
6	Tammilee Kerr	Jamaica	42.50	44.53	X	45.45	X	46.38	46.38	

=== Heptathlon ===
July 25–26

The highest mark recorded in each event is highlighted in yellow

Rank	Athlete	Nationality	100m H	HJ	SP	200m	LJ	JT	800m	Points	Notes
1st place, gold medalist(s)	Peaches Roach	Jamaica	13.53	1.87	11.50	23.87	5.59	29.87	2:18.33	5780	PB
2nd place, silver medalist(s)	Francia Manzanillo	Dominican Republic	14.09	1.66	12.31	25.27	5.63	40.33	2:19.31	5561	
3rd place, bronze medalist(s)	Tammilee Kerr	Jamaica	14.55	1.63	11.46	26.38	5.55	50.55	2:29.65	5345	
4	Yaritza Rivera	Puerto Rico	13.96	1.63	11.51	25.86	5.70	32.28	2:26.01	5216	SB
5	Guillerci Gonzalez	Venezuela	14.59	1.72	10.38	26.21	5.64	31.22	2:24.51	5113	
6	María Devia	Venezuela	15.31	1.60	11.39	25.79	5.65	42.77	2:33.11	5093	
7	Nahomi Rivera	Puerto Rico	15.26	1.60	12.15	26.53	5.45	39.32	2:32.84	4964	
8	Shianne Smith	Bermuda	15.05	1.57	10.52	24.82	5.36	29.48	2:22.54	4919	
9	Katy Sealy	Belize	16.63	1.60	9.88	28.20	4.92	32.96	2:43.16	4120	SB
