= Athletics at the 2010 Central American Games – Results =

These are the full results of the athletics competition at the 2010 Central American Games which took place between April 16 and April 19, 2010 in Ciudad de Panamá, Panamá.

== Men's results ==
=== 100 meters ===
Heat 1 – Wind: +0.4 m/s

Rank	Name	Nationality	Time	Notes
1	Cruz Rolando Palacios	Honduras	10.36	Q
2	Mateo Edward	Panama	10.92	Q
3	Daniel Alemán	Nicaragua	11.30	Q
4	Michael Guerrero	Costa Rica	11.55	

Heat 2 – Wind: +1.1 m/s

Rank	Name	Nationality	Time	Notes
1	Alonso Edward	Panama	10.60	Q
2	Josef Norales	Honduras	11.05	Q
3	Jorge Luis Jiménez	Costa Rica	11.11	Q
4	Benjamín Véliz	Nicaragua	11.20	q
5	Mark Anderson	Belize	11.39	q

Final – Wind: -0.2 m/s

Rank	Name	Nationality	Time	Notes
1st place, gold medalist(s)	Alonso Edward	Panama	10.24	GR
2nd place, silver medalist(s)	Cruz Rolando Palacios	Honduras	10.36	
3rd place, bronze medalist(s)	Mateo Edward	Panama	10.78	
4	Josef Norales	Honduras	10.78	
5	Jorge Luis Jiménez	Costa Rica	11.09	
6	Benjamín Véliz	Nicaragua	11.29	
7	Daniel Alemán	Nicaragua	11.34	
8	Mark Anderson	Belize	11.47	

=== 200 meters ===
Heat 1 – Wind: -0.1 m/s

Rank	Name	Nationality	Time	Notes
1	Alonso Edward	Panama	21.45	Q
2	Josef Norales	Honduras	22.26	Q
3	Víctor Cantillano	Costa Rica	22.39	Q
4	Benjamín Véliz	Nicaragua	22.90	
5	Mark Anderson	Belize	22.95	

Heat 2 – Wind: +0.3 m/s

Rank	Name	Nationality	Time	Notes
1	Cruz Rolando Palacios	Honduras	21.50	Q
2	Takeshi Fujiwara	El Salvador	21.84	Q
3	Mateo Edward	Panama	22.02	Q
4	Gary Robinson	Costa Rica	22.06	q
5	Daniel Alemán	Nicaragua	22.69	q

Final – Wind: +0.1 m/s

Rank	Name	Nationality	Time	Notes
1st place, gold medalist(s)	Cruz Palacios	Honduras	20.84	GR
2nd place, silver medalist(s)	Takeshi Fujiwara	El Salvador	21.62	
3rd place, bronze medalist(s)	Josef Norales	Honduras	21.84	
4	Gary Robinson	Costa Rica	22.06	
5	Víctor Cantillano	Costa Rica	22.16	
6	Mateo Edward	Panama	22.18	
7	Daniel Alemán	Nicaragua	22.54	
8	Alonso Edward	Panama	47.18	

=== 400 meters ===
Final

Rank	Name	Nationality	Time	Notes
1st place, gold medalist(s)	Nery Brenes	Costa Rica	47.21	GR
2nd place, silver medalist(s)	Takeshi Fujiwara	El Salvador	47.70	
3rd place, bronze medalist(s)	Pedro Suazo	Honduras	47.99	
4	Gary Robinson	Costa Rica	48.47	
5	Edgar Cortés	Nicaragua	49.85	
6	Luis Hassan	Panama	50.47	
7	Daniel Alemán	Nicaragua	50.71	
8	Andrés Rodríguez	Panama	51.28	

=== 800 meters ===
Final

Rank	Name	Nationality	Time	Notes
1st place, gold medalist(s)	Edgar Cortés	Nicaragua	1:53.19	
2nd place, silver medalist(s)	Arnoldo Monge	Costa Rica	1:53.20	
3rd place, bronze medalist(s)	Marcos Pérez	Costa Rica	1:54.27	
4	Irving Sánchez	Panama	1:54.92	
5	Lino Pérez	Panama	1:58.44	

=== 1500 meters ===
Final

Rank	Name	Nationality	Time	Notes
1st place, gold medalist(s)	Marcos Pérez	Costa Rica	4:01.77	
2nd place, silver medalist(s)	Álvaro Vásquez	Nicaragua	4:04.17	
3rd place, bronze medalist(s)	Irving Sánchez	Panama	4:08.29	
4	Agustín Alcázar	Panama	4:21.14	

=== 5000 meters ===
Final

Rank	Name	Nationality	Time	Notes
1st place, gold medalist(s)	William Sánchez	El Salvador	15:37.14	
2nd place, silver medalist(s)	Dimas Castro	Nicaragua	15:56.24	
3rd place, bronze medalist(s)	Jonathan Cerrud	Panama	16:29.60	
4	Agustín Alcázar	Panama	16:57.68	

=== 10,000 meters ===
Final

Rank	Name	Nationality	Time	Notes
1st place, gold medalist(s)	William Sánchez	El Salvador	32:57:32	
2nd place, silver medalist(s)	Jonathan Cerrud	Panama	33:15.21	
3rd place, bronze medalist(s)	Dimas Castro	Nicaragua	34:13.95	
	Agustín Alcázar	Panama	DNF	

=== 110 meters hurdles ===
Final – Wind: 0.0 m/s

Rank	Name	Nationality	Time	Notes
1st place, gold medalist(s)	Ronald Bennett	Honduras	14.15	GR
2nd place, silver medalist(s)	Jonathan Williams	Belize	14.18	
3rd place, bronze medalist(s)	Renán Palma	El Salvador	14.38	
4	Jonathan Gibson	Panama	14.73	
5	Camilo González	Panama	16.81	

=== 400 meters hurdles ===
Final

Rank	Name	Nationality	Time	Notes
1st place, gold medalist(s)	Jonathan Williams	Belize	50.53	GR
2nd place, silver medalist(s)	Jonathan Gibson	Panama	52.05	
3rd place, bronze medalist(s)	Lenín Venegas	Nicaragua	54.74	

=== 3000 meters steeplechase ===
Final

Rank	Name	Nationality	Time	Notes
1st place, gold medalist(s)	Álvaro Vásquez	Nicaragua	9:28.43	
2nd place, silver medalist(s)	Douglas Aguilar	El Salvador	9:40.36	
3rd place, bronze medalist(s)	Jonathan Cerrud	Panama	10:05.40	
	Fernando Caraballo	Panama	DQ	

=== High jump ===
Final

Rank	Name	Nationality	1.70	1.75	1.80	1.85	1.90	1.93	1.96	2.00	2.03	2.06	2.09	Result	Notes
1st place, gold medalist(s)	Marlon Colorado	El Salvador	-	-	-	-	-	o	-	xo	-	xo	xxx	2.06 m	
2nd place, silver medalist(s)	Henry Linton	Costa Rica	-	-	o	-	o	-	xo	o	o	xxx		2.03 m	
3rd place, bronze medalist(s)	Anselmo Delgado	Panama	-	o	o	o	xo	xxx						1.90 m	
	José Alberto Barahona	Panama	-	xx-	x									NH	

=== Long jump ===
Final

Rank	Name	Nationality	#1	#2	#3	#4	#5	#6	Result	Notes
1st place, gold medalist(s)	Irving Saladino	Panama	8.08 (0.0 m/s)	8.19 (0.0 m/s)	8.07 (-0.3 m/s)	-	7.97 (+0.1 m/s)	x	8.19 m (0.0 m/s)	GR
2nd place, silver medalist(s)	Jhamal Bowen	Panama	7.72 (0.0 m/s)	7.69 (0.0 m/s)	7.64 (-0.3 m/s)	x	x	x	7.72 m (0.0 m/s)	
3rd place, bronze medalist(s)	Kessel Campbell	Honduras	x	7.07 (0.0 m/s)	x	6.60 (+0.6 m/s)	x	7.19 (-0.4 m/s)	7.19 m (-0.4 m/s)	
4	Henry Linton	Costa Rica	3.28 (0.0 m/s)	-	6.61 (-0.1 m/s)	-	-	-	6.61 m (-0.1 m/s)	
5	Joel Wade	Belize	6.10 (0.0 m/s)	6.30 (0.0 m/s)	5.93 (+0.2 m/s)	6.04 (+0.1 m/s)	6.07 (+0.7 m/s)	6.12 (+0.7 m/s)	6.30 m (0.0 m/s)	

=== Triple jump ===
Final

Rank	Name	Nationality	#1	#2	#3	#4	#5	#6	Result	Notes
1st place, gold medalist(s)	Michael Thompson	Panama	15.37 (+0.3 m/s)	15.19 (0.0 m/s)	15.08 (+0.1 m/s)	x	15.08 (0.0 m/s)	x	15.37 m (+0.3 m/s)	
2nd place, silver medalist(s)	Jonathan Romero	Panama	14.76 (+0.3 m/s)	14.52 (0.0 m/s)	15.19 (+0.7 m/s)	14.78 (+0.4 m/s)	14.80 (-0.2 m/s)	15.25 (-0.3 m/s)	15.25 m (-0.3 m/s)	
3rd place, bronze medalist(s)	Jason Castro	Honduras	x	15.11 (+0.4 m/s)	14.59 (-0.2 m/s)	15.17 (-0.7 m/s)	14.79 (-0.6 m/s)	15.04 (+0.8 m/s)	15.17 m (-0.7 m/s)	
4	Joel Wade	Belize	13.21 (-0.5 m/s)	-	x	-	-	-	13.21 m (+0.9 m/s)	

=== Shot put ===
Final

Rank	Name	Nationality	#1	#2	#3	#4	#5	#6	Result	Notes
1st place, gold medalist(s)	Juan José Álvarez	Honduras	13.49	13.35	13.61	13.54	13.75	13.31	13.75 m	
2nd place, silver medalist(s)	Nelson Chavarría	Costa Rica	11.66	11.73	12.84	11.93	12.49	11.75	12.84 m	
3rd place, bronze medalist(s)	Esteban Caballero	Panama	11.31	11.66	11.77	12.45	12.09	11.02	12.45 m	
4	Josué Morales	Panama	x	x	11.58	12.12	x	11.75	12.12 m	

=== Discus throw ===
Final

Rank	Name	Nationality	#1	#2	#3	#4	#5	#6	Result	Notes
1st place, gold medalist(s)	Winston Campbell	Honduras	x	43.93	44.82	44.74	45.23	x	45.23 m	
2nd place, silver medalist(s)	Nelson Chavarría	Costa Rica	44.02	41.06	41.42	35.05	45.04	44.34	45.04 m	
3rd place, bronze medalist(s)	Juan Galdámez	El Salvador	37.96	43.77	38.70	42.15	41.26	39.61	43.77 m	
4	Kairo Martínez	Nicaragua	x	39.71	x	39.46	40.67	40.72	40.72 m	
5	Joel Domínguez	Panama	38.65	x	x	28.66	38.10	38.03	38.65 m	

=== Javelin throw ===
Final

Rank	Name	Nationality	#1	#2	#3	#4	#5	#6	Result	Notes
1st place, gold medalist(s)	Rigoberto Calderón	Nicaragua	60.37	57.72	x	58.41	61.91	60.42	61.91 m	
2nd place, silver medalist(s)	Julio Lojo	Panama	55.19	56.63	56.58	56.33	58.22	60.79	60.79 m	
3rd place, bronze medalist(s)	Benigno Ortega	Panama	59.62	x	-	56.02	-	56.33	59.62 m	
4	Javier Ugarte	Nicaragua	56.55	x	56.26	54.93	53.98	54.38	56.55 m	

=== Decathlon ===
Final

The highest mark recorded in each event is highlighted in yellow

Rank	Name	Nationality	100m	LJ	SP	HJ	400m	110m H	DT	PV	JT	1500m	Points	Notes
1st place, gold medalist(s)	Alberto Perriman	Panama	11.09 (-0.6)	6.46 (+0.4)	9.56	1.75	51.02	18.36 (-0.5)	23.60	2.60	32.26	5:09.15	5274 pts	
2nd place, silver medalist(s)	Allan Bustillo	Honduras	12.09 (-0.6)	5.56 (+0.3)	9.26	1.66	56.27	18.33 (-0.5)	30.64	2.60	44.49	4:49.65	4992 pts	
3rd place, bronze medalist(s)	Jorge Mena	Panama	11.76 (-0.6)	5.72 (+0.7)	8.78	1.63	51.58	21.93 (-0.5)	25.20	2.50	44.50	4:42.82	4867 pts	

=== 20,000 meters track walk ===
Final

Rank	Name	Nationality	Time	Notes
1st place, gold medalist(s)	Allan Segura	Costa Rica	1:34:12.15	
2nd place, silver medalist(s)	Jassir Cabrera	Panama	1:40:24.10	
3rd place, bronze medalist(s)	Gerardo Lee	Panama	1:48:31.00	

=== 4 x 100 meters relay ===
Final

Rank	Nation	Competitors	Time	Notes
1st place, gold medalist(s)	Panama	Jonathan Romero; Mateo Edward; Jonathan Gibson; Jhamal Bowen	41.69	
2nd place, silver medalist(s)	Costa Rica	Gary Robinson; Víctor Cantillano; Arnoldo Monge; Michael Guerrero	42.16	
	Honduras	Ronald Bennett; Cruz Rolando Palacios; Pedro Suazo; Josef Norales	FS	

=== 4 x 400 meters relay ===
Final

Rank	Nation	Competitors	Time	Notes
1st place, gold medalist(s)	Costa Rica	Arnoldo Monge; Gary Robinson; Nery Brenes; Víctor Cantillano	3:12.41	GR
2nd place, silver medalist(s)	Panama	Andrés Rodríguez; Jonathan Gibson; Luis Hassan; Lino Pérez	3:21.74	
3rd place, bronze medalist(s)	Nicaragua	Benjamin Véliz; Daniel Alemán; Edgar Cortés; Lenín Venegas	3:28.29	

== Women's results ==
=== 100 meters ===
Heat 1 – Wind: +0.3 m/s

Rank	Name	Nationality	Time	Notes
1	Kaina Martinez	Belize	12.11	Q
2	Jéssica Lino	Honduras	12.59	Q
3	Mariela Leal	Costa Rica	12.79	Q
4	Nohelis Díaz	Panama	13.18	q
5	Vanessa Romero	Nicaragua	13.42	

Heat 2 – Wind: -0.3 m/s

Rank	Name	Nationality	Time	Notes
1	Shantelly Scott	Costa Rica	12.47	Q
2	Tricia Flores	Belize	12.48	Q
3	Mardel Alvarado	Panama	12.64	Q
4	Janahi Cornejo	Nicaragua	13.08	q

Final – Wind: +0.2 m/s

Rank	Name	Nationality	Time	Notes
1st place, gold medalist(s)	Kaina Martinez	Belize	12.05	
2nd place, silver medalist(s)	Mardel Alvarado	Panama	12.38	
3rd place, bronze medalist(s)	Shantelly Scott	Costa Rica	12.42	
4	Tricia Flores	Belize	12.56	
5	Jéssica Lino	Honduras	12.62	
6	Mariela Leal	Costa Rica	12.73	
7	Janahi Cornejo	Nicaragua	13.11	
8	Nohelis Díaz	Panama	13.13	

=== 200 meters ===
Heat 1 – Wind: +0.7 m/s

Rank	Name	Nationality	Time	Notes
1	Kaina Martínez	Belize	24.98	Q
2	Sharolyn Scott	Costa Rica	25.22	Q
3	Natalia Santamaría	El Salvador	25.44	Q
4	Mardel Alvarado	Panama	25.79	q
5	Ingrid Narváez	Nicaragua	26.40	q

Heat 2 – Wind: -1.0 m/s

Rank	Name	Nationality	Time	Notes
1	Tracy Joseph	Costa Rica	25.66	Q
2	Kathi Cuadra	Nicaragua	25.75	Q
3	Yelena Alvear	Panama	25.80	Q
4	Kareema Roaches	Belize	27.69	
	Jéssica Lino	Honduras	FS	

Final – Wind: +0.5 m/s

Rank	Name	Nationality	Time	Notes
1st place, gold medalist(s)	Kaina Martínez	Belize	24.89	
2nd place, silver medalist(s)	Tracy Joseph	Costa Rica	25.12	
3rd place, bronze medalist(s)	Natalia Santamaría	El Salvador	25.30	
4	Sharolyn Scott	Costa Rica	25.40	
5	Kathi Cuadra	Nicaragua	25.41	
6	Mardel Alvarado	Panama	25.47	
7	Yelena Alvear	Panama	25.80	
8	Ingrid Narváez	Nicaragua	26.47	

=== 400 meters ===
Final

Rank	Name	Nationality	Time	Notes
1st place, gold medalist(s)	Kathi Cuadra	Nicaragua	56.25	
2nd place, silver medalist(s)	Sharolyn Scott	Costa Rica	56.75	
3rd place, bronze medalist(s)	Yelena Alvear	Panama	57.71	
4	Natalia Santamaría	El Salvador	57.99	
5	Ingrid Narváez	Nicaragua	1:00.03	

=== 800 meters ===
Final

Rank	Name	Nationality	Time	Notes
1st place, gold medalist(s)	Andrea Ferris	Panama	2:02.52	GR
2nd place, silver medalist(s)	Rolanda Bell	Panama	2:10.12	
3rd place, bronze medalist(s)	Gladys Landaverde	El Salvador	2:12.04	
4	Kathi Cuadra	Nicaragua	2:13.61	

=== 1500 meters ===
Final

Rank	Name	Nationality	Time	Notes
1st place, gold medalist(s)	Andrea Ferris	Panama	4:18.38	GR
2nd place, silver medalist(s)	Rolanda Bell	Panama	4:26.29	
3rd place, bronze medalist(s)	Gladys Landaverde	El Salvador	4:26.58	
4	Yelka Mairena	Nicaragua	5:17.19	

=== 5000 meters ===
Final

Rank	Name	Nationality	Time	Notes
1st place, gold medalist(s)	María Ferris	Panama	18:04.51	
2nd place, silver medalist(s)	Mónica Vargas	Costa Rica	18:39.14	
3rd place, bronze medalist(s)	Aldy Villalobos	Nicaragua	18:58.62	

=== 10,000 meters ===
Final

Rank	Name	Nationality	Time	Notes
1st place, gold medalist(s)	Gabriela Traña	Costa Rica	37:31.17	
2nd place, silver medalist(s)	María Ferris	Panama	38:20.86	
3rd place, bronze medalist(s)	Aldy Villalobos	Nicaragua	42:26.85	

=== 100 meters hurdles ===
Final – Wind: -0.5 m/s

Rank	Name	Nationality	Time	Notes
1st place, gold medalist(s)	Jeimmy Bernárdez	Honduras	14.55	GR
2nd place, silver medalist(s)	Ana María Porras	Costa Rica	15.90	
3rd place, bronze medalist(s)	Migdalia Morgan	Panama	17.32	
4	Madeline Mendoza	Panama	18.18	

=== 400 meters hurdles ===
Final

Rank	Name	Nationality	Time	Notes
1st place, gold medalist(s)	Sharolyn Scott	Costa Rica	1:01.51	
2nd place, silver medalist(s)	Jéssica Aguilera	Nicaragua	1:03.63	
3rd place, bronze medalist(s)	Gabriela Guevara	Panama	1:04.26	
4	Ana María Porras	Costa Rica	1:05.38	
5	Ángela Ferris	Panama	1:15.50	

=== 3000 meters steeplechase ===
Final

Rank	Name	Nationality	Time	Notes
1st place, gold medalist(s)	Andrea Ferris	Panama	10:13.20	GR
2nd place, silver medalist(s)	Blanca Solís	El Salvador	12:08.14	
3rd place, bronze medalist(s)	Yelka Mairena	Nicaragua	12:27.51	

=== High jump ===
Final

Rank	Name	Nationality	1.45	1.50	1.55	1.60	1.65	1.70	1.74	Result	Notes
1st place, gold medalist(s)	Alejandra Gómez	Costa Rica	-	o	-	o	o	o	xxx	1.70 m	
2nd place, silver medalist(s)	Kashany Ríos	Panama	-	o	o	xo	xxx			1.60 m	
	Lorena Camero	Panama	xxx							NH	

=== Long jump ===
Final

Rank	Name	Nationality	#1	#2	#3	#4	#5	#6	Result	Notes
1st place, gold medalist(s)	Tricia Flores	Belize	5.72 (+0.1 m/s)	5.75 (-0.2 m/s)	5.97 (-2.0 m/s)	x	x	-	5.97 m (-2.0 m/s)	GR
2nd place, silver medalist(s)	Kaina Martinez	Belize	5.43 (-0.3 m/s)	x	x	5.07 (+0.1 m/s)	5.49 (+0.9 m/s)	-	5.49 m (+0.9 m/s)	
3rd place, bronze medalist(s)	Gabriela Guevara	Panama	x	4.23 (-0.9 m/s)	5.15 (0.0 m/s)	5.05 (-0.8 m/s)	5.15 (0.0 m/s)	5.14 (+0.2 m/s)	5.15 m (0.0 m/s)	
4	Leony Diñe	Panama	4.44 (-0.4 m/s)	4.64 (-0.4 m/s)	x	4.84 (-0.2 m/s)	4.66 (-0.2 m/s)	4.54 (-0.8 m/s)	4.84 m (-0.2 m/s)	

=== Shot put ===
Final

Rank	Name	Nationality	#1	#2	#3	#4	#5	#6	Result	Notes
1st place, gold medalist(s)	Aixa Middleton	Panama	10.68	10.73	11.08	11.08	11.45	11.69	11.69 m	
2nd place, silver medalist(s)	Silvia Pinar	Costa Rica	x	x	10.30	11.26	x	x	11.26 m	
3rd place, bronze medalist(s)	Elena Lojo	Panama	10.39	10.91	10.37	10.16	10.08	10.05	10.91 m	
4	María Lourdes Ruiz	Nicaragua	10.31	10.16	x	10.74	10.28	10.56	10.74 m	

=== Discus throw ===
Final

Rank	Name	Nationality	#1	#2	#3	#4	#5	#6	Result	Notes
1st place, gold medalist(s)	Aixa Middleton	Panama	46.71	47.10	x	44.59	x	46.40	47.10 m	
2nd place, silver medalist(s)	Silvia Pinar	Costa Rica	38.26	x	35.30	37.46	35.89	34.55	38.26 m	
3rd place, bronze medalist(s)	Viviana Abarca	Costa Rica	37.23	36.12	37.71	37.07	35.11	36.99	37.71 m	
4	Gisela Henríquez	Panama	x	x	29.48	x	27.64	33.88	33.88 m	
5	María Lourdes Ruiz	Nicaragua	x	33.74	x	33.05	x	31.86	33.74 m	

=== Hammer throw ===
Final

Rank	Name	Nationality	#1	#2	#3	#4	#5	#6	Result	Notes
1st place, gold medalist(s)	Viviana Abarca	Costa Rica	44.23	x	46.37	x	43.54	44.53	46.37 m	
2nd place, silver medalist(s)	Elena Lojo	Panama	42.18	39.37	44.12	x	42.79	43.23	44.12 m	
3rd place, bronze medalist(s)	Ana Harry	Honduras	38.54	37.08	37.45	37.43	x	39.91	39.91 m	
4	Aixa Middleton	Panama	28.39	x	x	33.24	x	x	33.24 m	

=== Javelin throw ===
Final

Rank	Name	Nationality	#1	#2	#3	#4	#5	#6	Result	Notes
1st place, gold medalist(s)	Rocío Navarro	Panama	x	43.99	x	42.63	43.43	46.46	46.46 m	
2nd place, silver medalist(s)	Lorena Medina	El Salvador	38.69	41.46	41.91	41.29	42.71	40.29	42.71 m	
3rd place, bronze medalist(s)	Génova Arias	Costa Rica	38.29	37.37	x	32.80	37.32	x	38.29 m	
4	Ana Ortíz	Panama	29.29	32.95	33.01	30.85	32.24	33.17	33.17 m	

=== Heptathlon ===
Final

The highest mark recorded in each event is highlighted in yellow

Rank	Name	Nationality	100m H	HJ	SP	200m	LJ	JT	800m	Points	Notes
1st place, gold medalist(s)	Alejandra Gómez	Costa Rica	15.76 (+1.0)	1.73	7.31	26.91 (+0.3)	5.25 (+0.4)	26.10	2:46.46	4241 pts	GR
2nd place, silver medalist(s)	Inaly Morazán	Nicaragua	15.61 (+1.0)	1.52	7.90	27.25 (+0.3)	4.91 (-0.1)	25.28	2:49.12	3887 pts	
3rd place, bronze medalist(s)	Lilian Koo	Panama	19.95 (+1.0)	1.28	6.09	28.78 (+0.3)	4.59 (0.0)	23.64	3:08.39	2642 pts	

=== 4 x 100 meters relay ===
Final

Rank	Nation	Competitors	Time	Notes
1st place, gold medalist(s)	Costa Rica	Alejandra Gómez; Shantelly Scott; Mariela Leal; Tracy Joseph	48.45	
2nd place, silver medalist(s)	Panama	Kashany Ríos; Yelena Alvear; Migdalia Morgan; Mardel Alvarado	48.85	
3rd place, bronze medalist(s)	Nicaragua	Janahi Cornejo; Jéssica Aguilera; Kathi Cuadra; Vanessa Romero	49.20	

=== 4 x 400 meters relay ===
Final

Rank	Nation	Competitors	Time	Notes
1st place, gold medalist(s)	Panama	Andrea Ferris; Mardel Alvarado; Rolanda Bell; Yelena Alvear	3:50.53	
2nd place, silver medalist(s)	Nicaragua	Ingrid Narváez; Jéssica Aguilera; Kathi Cuadra; Vanessa Romero	3:52.49	
3rd place, bronze medalist(s)	Costa Rica	Mariela Leal; Shantelly Scott; Sharolyn Scott; Tracy Joseph	3:54.83	
