= Richer Pérez =

Cuban marathon runner

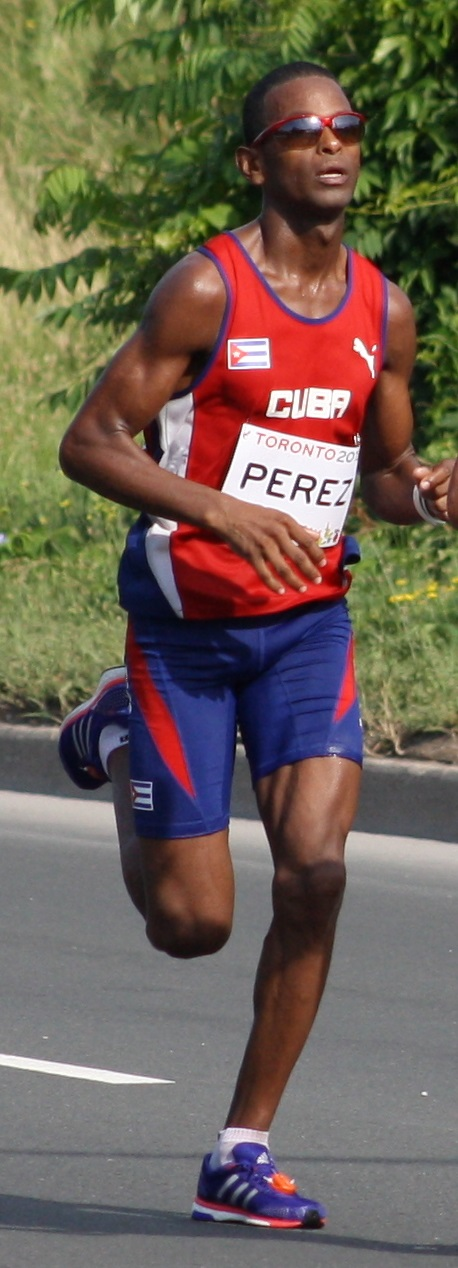

Personal information
- Born: 20 February 1986 (age 40) Havana, country

Sport
- Sport: Track and field
- Event: Long-distance running
Medal record
Representing Cuba
Pan American Games
| Gold medal – first place | 2015 Toronto | Marathon |
Central American and Caribbean Games
| Gold medal – first place | 2014 Veracruz | Marathon |

Richer Pérez Cobas (born 20 February 1986) is a Cuban long-distance runner who specialises in the marathon. He was the gold medallist at the 2015 Pan American Games and the 2014 Central American and Caribbean Games.

From Havana, Pérez first established himself nationally at the 2007 Barrientos Memorial meet in Havana, winning the 10,000 metres. At the 2011 meet he set new personal bests when he won the 10,000 m in a time of 29:56.32 minutes and was runner-up in the 5000 metres, behind Mexico's Sergio Pedraza. Later that year he won the half marathon section of the Marabana, then claimed victory on his marathon debut at the Panama City Marathon with a time of 2:25:48 hours.

He competed only domestically over the next two years, continuing with two further wins at the Marabana Half Marathon and back-to-back titles in the Cuban Independence Anniversary Half Marathon. He also won a track title over 10,000 m at the Copa de Cuba in 2012. He repeated that feat in 2014 and also won a distance double at the Barrientos Memorial. After a fourth straight win at the Marabana Half marathon he was chosen to represent Cuba internationally for the first time at the 2014 Central American and Caribbean Games. There he was the gold medallist in the marathon with a personal best time of 2:19:13 hours. This made him the first Cuban to win a marathon at that competition, which was first held in 1938.

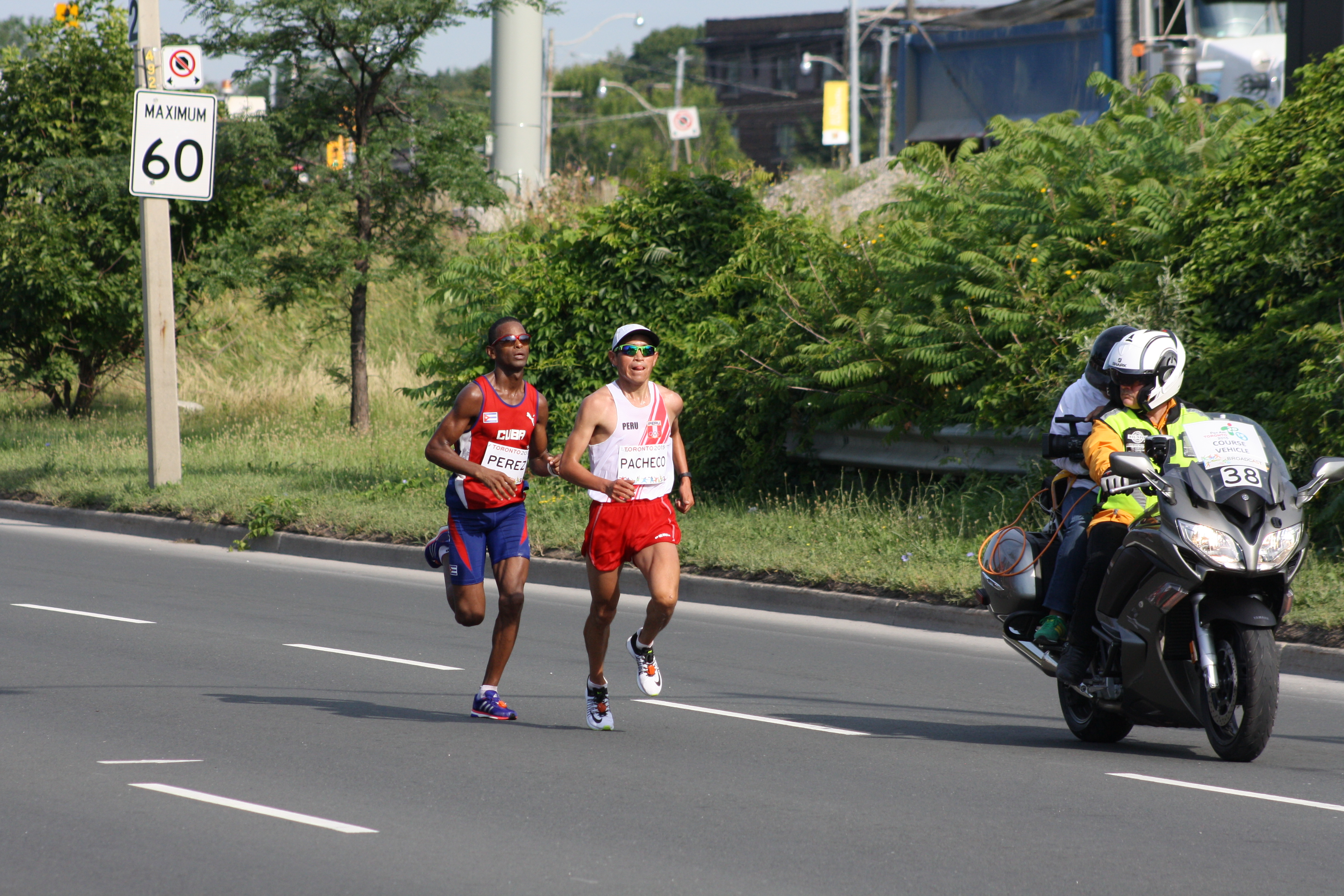
Pérez (left) and Pacheco during the men's marathon at the 2015 Pan American Games.

At the start of the 2015 season, he upheld his place as the country's top distance runner with a track double at the Copa de Cuba and a 10,000 m win at the Barrientos Memorial. He surprised on his second international performance at the 2015 Pan American Games: entering only his third marathon, he defeated the more favoured Raúl Pacheco (a Peruvian Olympian) to maintain his undefeated streak at the distance. His finishing time of 2:17:04 hours was a personal best and also reached his objective of running a qualifying time for the 2015 World Championships in Athletics.

== Personal bests ==
- 5000 metres – 14:25.33 min (2011)
- 10,000 metres – 29:56.32 min (2011)
- Half marathon – 1:05:21 (2013)
- Marathon – 2:17:04 (2015)

== International competitions ==
| Year | Competition | Venue | Position | Event | Notes |
|---|---|---|---|---|---|
| 2014 | Central American and Caribbean Games | Veracruz, Mexico | 1st | Marathon | 2:19:13 |
| 2015 | Pan American Games | Toronto, Canada | 1st | Marathon | 2:17:04 |
