= Enrique Llanos =

Puerto Rican hurdler

Personal information
- Born: 5 July 1980 (age 45) San Juan, Puerto Rico

Sport
- Sport: Track and field

Enrique Llanos (born 5 July 1980) is a Puerto Rican hurdler. He competed in the 110 m hurdles event at the 2012 Summer Olympics.

== Competition record ==
Major Championship Events

Year	Competition	Venue	Position	Event	Notes
Representing Puerto Rico
2005	Central American and Caribbean Championships	Nassau, Bahamas	6th	110 m hurdles	13.69 (w)
2006	Ibero-American Championships	Ponce, Puerto Rico	3rd	110 m hurdles	13.86
2007	NACAC Championships	San Salvador, El Salvador	5th	110 m hurdles	13.99
2007	Pan American Games	Rio de Janeiro, Brazil	9th (h)	110 m hurdles	13.89
2008	Ibero-American Championships	Iquique, Chile	DQ (2nd)	110 m hurdles	DQ (13.89) - Doping
2008	Central American and Caribbean Championships	Cali, Colombia	DQ (8th)	110 m hurdles	DQ - Doping
2011	Central American and Caribbean Championships	Mayagüez, Puerto Rico	7th	110 m hurdles	13.88
2011	Pan American Games	Guadalajara, Mexico	6th	110 m hurdles	13.52
2012	World Indoor Championships	Istanbul, Turkey	29th (h)	60 m hurdles	9.65
2012	Olympic Games	London, United Kingdom	–	110 m hurdles	DNF
2013	Central American and Caribbean Championships	Morelia, Mexico	7th	110 m hurdles	14.26
2013	Central American and Caribbean Championships	Morelia, Mexico	5th	4 × 100 m relay	39.72
