= Jovanee Jarrett =

Jamaican long jumper (born 1983)

Jovanee Jarrett (born 15 January 1983) is a Jamaican long jumper.

She competed at the 2009 World Championships without reaching the final. Her personal best is 6.75 metres, achieved in June 2009 in Kingston, Jamaica.

Competing for the Auburn Tigers track and field team, Jarrett won the long jump at the 2006 NCAA Division I Outdoor Track and Field Championships.

== Achievements ==
Year	Competition	Venue	Position	Notes
Representing Jamaica
2000	CARIFTA Games (U20)	St. George's, Grenada	4th	5.69 m
2001	CARIFTA Games (U20)	Bridgetown, Barbados	6th	5.32 m
2006	Central American and Caribbean Games	Mayagüez, Puerto Rico	5th	6.02 m
2009	World Championships	Berlin, Germany	16th (q)	6.43 m
2010	World Indoor Championships	Doha, Qatar	13th (q)	6.37 m
2010	Central American and Caribbean Games	Mayagüez, Puerto Rico	2nd	6.52 m
2011	World Championships	Daegu, South Korea	28th (q)	6.19 m
2014	Commonwealth Games	Glasgow, United Kingdom	13th (q)	6.24 m
