= Santa Teresa, Nicaragua =

Santa Teresa
- Municipality

- Municipal location in the Carazo Department

- Location in Nicaragua
- Coordinates: 11°44′N 86°13′W
- Country: Nicaragua
- Department: Carazo Department

Area
  - Total: 82 sq mi (213 km^{2})

Population (2005)
  - Total: 16,891

Santa Teresa is a municipality in the Carazo department of Nicaragua. It contains 42 communities.

Olympic middle-distance runner Edgar Cortez was born in Santa Teresa.
