= Héctor Cotto =

Puerto Rican hurdler (born 1984)

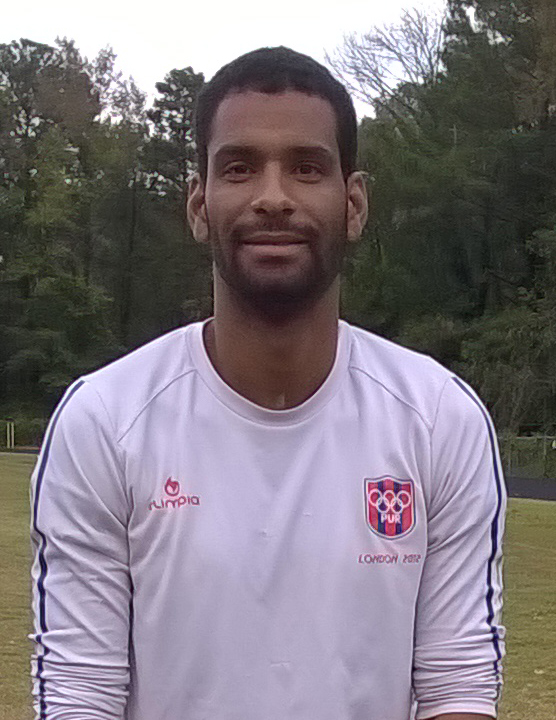
- Cotto in 2016

Personal information
- Full name: Héctor Cotto González
- Nationality: Puerto Rican
- Born: 8 August 1984 (age 42) Fajardo, Puerto Rico
- Height: 1.91 m (6 ft 3 in)
- Weight: 86 kg (190 lb)

Sport
- Sport: Athletics
- Event: 110 m hurdles
Medal record
Representing Puerto Rico
Central American and Caribbean Games
Bronze medal – third place	2010 Mayaguez	110m hurdles
- Updated on 23 January 2015

Héctor Cotto González (born August 8, 1984) is a Puerto Rican Olympic athlete specializing in the 110 meters hurdles.

== Background ==
Cotto was born in Fajardo, Puerto Rico. His family moved to Irondequoit, New York, where he attended Eastridge High School. When his family moved to Cary, North Carolina, he attended Green Hope High School and graduated in 2002.

At Green Hope High, Cotto played football, ran track and field, and earned several all-conference honors for track. His personal best for the 110 and 55 meter hurdles ranked him at 11th in the nation in 2002. As of 2015, Cotto still holds several Green Hope High School records in track.

Cotto attended Fayetteville State University, but transferred to East Carolina University after one year. While at East Carolina, he broke their records for the 60 and 110 meter hurdles.

== Olympics ==
After graduation from ECU, Cotto began his professional career representing Puerto Rico. He competed in the 110 meter hurdles in both the Beijing Olympics in 2008 and the London Olympics in 2012. He also competed in the World Athletics Championships in 2007, 2009, and 2011.

=== Competition record ===
Year	Competition	Venue	Position	Event	Notes
Representing Puerto Rico
2005	Central American and Caribbean Championships	Nassau, Bahamas	8th	110 m hurdles	14.05 (w)
2007	NACAC Championships	San Salvador, El Salvador	4th	110 m hurdles	13.90
2007	Pan American Games	Rio de Janeiro, Brazil	8th	110 m hurdles	14.09
2008	Central American and Caribbean Championships	Cali, Colombia	3rd	110 m hurdles	13.55
2008	Olympic Games	Beijing, China	27th (qf)	110 m hurdles	13.73
2009	Central American and Caribbean Championships	Havana, Cuba	4th	110 m hurdles	13.63
2009	World Championships	Berlin, Germany	35th (h)	110 m hurdles	13.81
2010	World Indoor Championships	Doha, Qatar	19th (h)	60 m hurdles	7.87
2010	Ibero-American Championships	San Fernando, Spain	1st	110 m hurdles	13.54 (NR)
2010	Central American and Caribbean Games	Mayagüez, Puerto Rico	3rd	110 m hurdles	13.71
2010	Central American and Caribbean Games	Mayagüez, Puerto Rico	4th	4 × 100 m relay	39.18
2011	Central American and Caribbean Championships	Mayagüez, Puerto Rico	2nd	110 m hurdles	13.54
2011	Central American and Caribbean Championships	Mayagüez, Puerto Rico	5th	4 × 100 m relay	39.71
2011	World Championships	Daegu, South Korea	20th (h)	110 m hurdles	13.60
2011	Pan American Games	Guadalajara, Mexico	5th	110 m hurdles	13.49
2012	Ibero-American Championships	Barquisimeto, Venezuela	2nd	110 m hurdles	13.69
2012	Olympic Games	London, United Kingdom	42nd (h)	110 m hurdles	14.08
2013	Central American and Caribbean Championships	Morelia, Mexico	6th	110 m hurdles	14.25
2014	World Indoor Championships	Sopot, Poland	25th (h)	60 m hurdles	7.94
2014	Pan American Sports Festival	Mexico City, Mexico	10th (h)	110m hurdles	14.31 A (wind: -0.2 m/s)

=== Personal bests ===
Cotto holds the Puerto Rican national record for 110m hurdles and the 60m hurdles. Of hurdling, he says, "Running is the easy part. To me it’s always been about the technique. The ultimate goal is to be so efficient over the hurdles that you can let loose and just run when you race. That’s when hurdling is fun. That’s what all the hard work is for.”

==== Outdoors ====
- 100m 10.37 (+1.4 m/s) (Walnut 2010)
- 110m hurdles 13.49 (+1.6 m/s) (Guadalajara 2011)

==== Indoors ====
- 60m hurdles 7.71 (Flagstaff 2014)

== Awards and honors ==
Cotto won the gold medal for 110m hurdles at the Ibero-American Championships in 2010, followed by the silver medal for 110m hurdles in 2012.

In 2015, Green Hope High School inducted Cotto into the first class of their Athletic Hall of Fame.

== Personal life ==
As of 2015, Cotto coaches track & field at William G. Enloe High School in Raleigh, North Carolina. He also helps train other coaches through his online Hurdle Rhythm Training Series, training workshops, and The Hurdle Magazine.
