= Edgar Cortez =

Nicaraguan middle-distance runner

Personal information
- Full name: Edgar Alejandro Cortez Espinoza
- Born: August 10, 1989 (age 37) Santa Teresa, Nicaragua
- Height: 1.70 m (5 ft 7 in)
- Weight: 55 kg (121 lb)

Sport
- Country: Nicaragua
- Sport: Middle distance running
- Updated on 26 July 2014

Edgar Alejandro Cortez Espinoza (born August 10, 1989, in Santa Teresa, Carazo, Nicaragua) is a Nicaraguan middle distance runner who specializes in the 800 metres. His personal best in the event is 1:49.10 achieved in 2011 in Daegu which is the current Nicaraguan record.

He competed at the 2012 Summer Olympics, in London, England. He was 7th in his round 1 heat with a time of 1:58.99.

== Personal bests ==
- 400 m: 49.85 s – (Panama) Ciudad de Panamá, 18 April 2010
- 800 m: 1:49.10 min – (South Korea) Daegu, 27 August 2011

== Competition record ==
| Year | Competition | Venue | Position | Event | Notes |
Representing Nicaragua
| 2008 | Central American Championships | San Pedro Sula, Honduras | 7th | 400 m | 52.67 |
| 2008 | Central American Championships | San Pedro Sula, Honduras | 4th | 800 m | 1:55.09 |
| 2008 | Central American Championships | San Pedro Sula, Honduras | 5th | 4 × 400 m relay | 3:25.91 |
| 2008 | Central American Junior Championships | San Salvador, El Salvador | — | 400 m | DNF |
| 2008 | Central American Junior Championships | San Salvador, El Salvador | 1st | 800 m | 1:56.13 |
| 2008 | Central American Junior Championships | San Salvador, El Salvador | — | 4 × 100 m relay | DQ |
| 2008 | Central American Junior Championships | San Salvador, El Salvador | 4th | 4 × 400 m relay | 3:38.05 |
| 2009 | Central American Championships | Guatemala City, Guatemala | 3rd | 800 m | 1:56.47 |
| 2010 | World Indoor Championships | Doha, Qatar | 25th (h) | 800 m | 1:58.47 |
| 2010 | Central American Games | Panama City, Panama | 5th | 400 m | 49.85 |
| 2010 | Central American Games | Panama City, Panama | 1st | 800 m | 1:53.19 |
| 2010 | Central American Games | Panama City, Panama | 3rd | 4 × 400 m relay | 3:28:29 |
| 2010 | NACAC U-23 Championships | Miramar, Florida, United States | 4th (h) | 800 m | 1:51.01 |
| 2010 | Central American and Caribbean Games | Mayagüez, Puerto Rico | 8th | 800 m | 1:51.62 |
| 2011 | Central American Championships | San José, Costa Rica | 5th | 400 m | 49.96 |
| 2011 | Central American Championships | San José, Costa Rica | 3rd | 800 m | 1:51.84 |
| 2011 | Central American and Caribbean Championships | Mayagüez, Puerto Rico | 4th | 800 m | 1:49.74 |
| 2011 | Universiade | Shenzhen, China | 28th (h) | 800 m | 1:52.05 |
| 2011 | World Championships | Daegu, South Korea | 35th (h) | 800 m | 1:49.10 (NR) |
| 2011 | Pan American Games | Guadalajara, Mexico | 14th (h) | 800 m | 1:59.02 |
| 2012 | Ibero-American Championships | Barquisimeto, Venezuela | 7th | 800 m | 1:51.55 |
| 2012 | Central American Championships | Managua, Nicaragua | 1st | 800 m | 1:53.03 |
| 2012 | Central American Championships | Managua, Nicaragua | 7th | 1500 m | 4:11.24 |
| 2012 | Central American Championships | Managua, Nicaragua | 3rd | 4 × 400 m relay | 3:19.56 |
| 2012 | Olympic Games | London, United Kingdom | 51st (h) | 800 m | 1:58.99 |
