= Indira Spence =

Jamaican hurdler

Indira Spence (born 8 September 1986, in Trelawny) is a Jamaican athlete who specialises in the 100 metres hurdles. She represented her country at the 2011 World Championships reaching the semifinals, as well as the 2014 World Indoor Championships.

She has personal bests of 12.92 seconds in 100 metres hurdles (+1.3 m/s, Kingston 2012) and 8.05 seconds in the 60 metres hurdles (Fayetteville 2010).

== Competition record ==
Year	Competition	Venue	Position	Event	Notes
Representing Jamaica
2010	Central American and Caribbean Games	Mayagüez, Puerto Rico	5th	100 m hurdles	13.22
2011	Universiade	Shenzhen, China	7th (sf)	100 m hurdles	13.26^{1}
2011	World Championships	Daegu, South Korea	13th (sf)	100 m hurdles	12.93
2013	Central American and Caribbean Championships	Morelia, Mexico	5th	100 m hurdles	13.49
2014	World Indoor Championships	Sopot, Poland	18th (h)	60 m hurdles	8.14
2014	Commonwealth Games	Glasgow, United Kingdom	11th (h)	100 m hurdles	13.44

^{1}Did not finish in the final
