= Craig Leon (runner) =

American long-distance runner

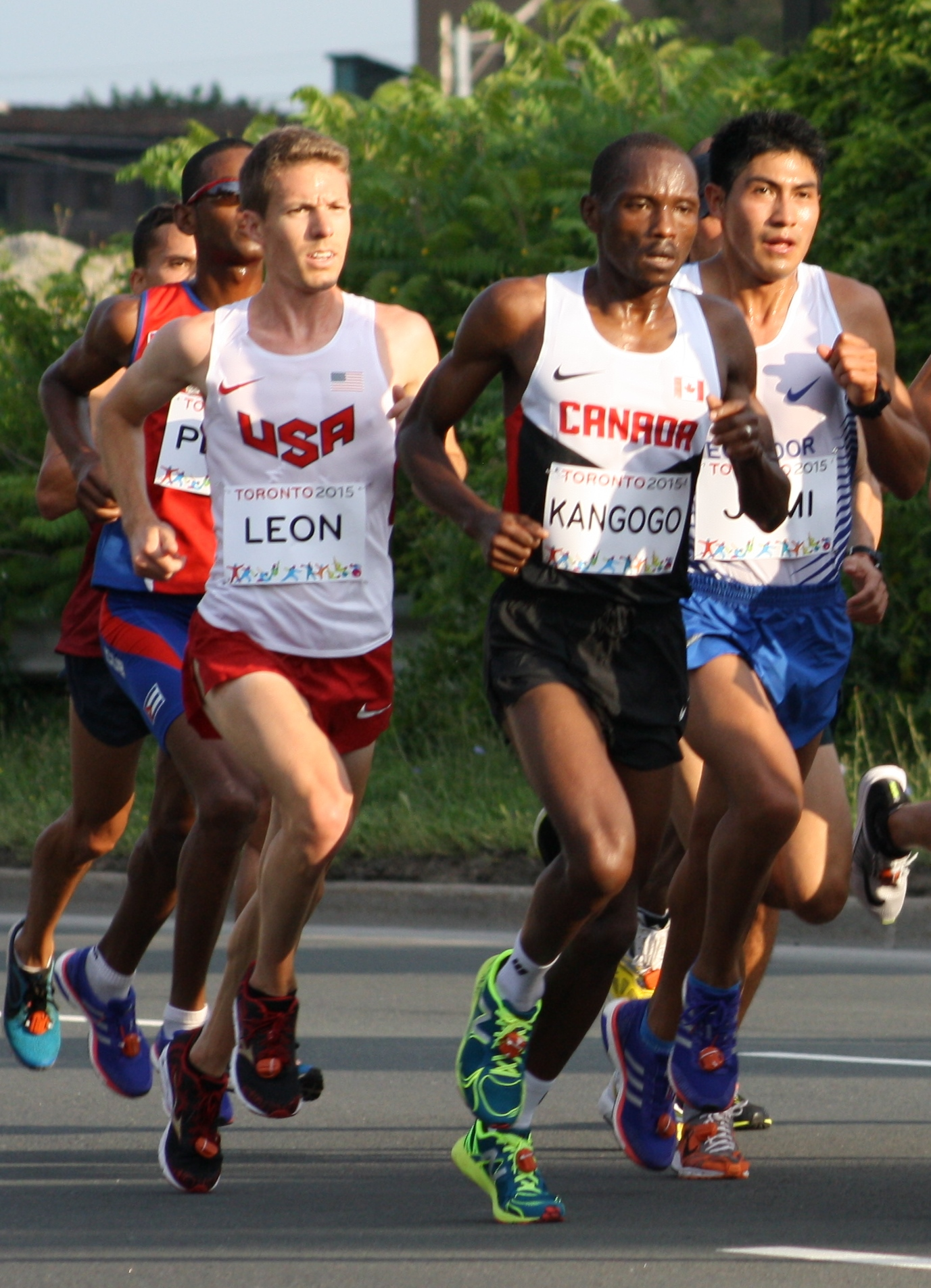
- Leon (left) racing with Kip Kangogo at the 2015 Pan Am Games men's marathon

Personal information
- Nationality: American
- Born: November 8, 1984 (age 41) Van Wert, Ohio

Sport
- Sport: Track, long-distance running
- Event(s): 5000 meters, 10,000 meters, marathon
- College team: Ohio University

Achievements and titles
- Personal best(s): 5000m: 14:18.36; 10,000m: 29:49.90 ½ marathon: 1:04:02; Marathon: 2:13:53

Craig Leon (born November 8, 1984) is an American distance runner who represented the United States in the men's marathon at the 2015 Pan American Games.

== Running career ==
=== High school ===
Leon first participated in competitive running at Van Wert High School. At the 2002 OHSAA Boys' Division II state cross country championships, Leon placed 11th overall in the 5K in 16:31. In his senior year cross country season, his best result in the 5K was 16:03. He graduated from Van Wert in 2003.

=== Collegiate ===
Leon attended Ohio University, where he became a walk-on for Ohio's cross country and track teams. Ohio coach Mitch Bentley had told Leon, "You want to walk on? Sure, go ahead". At the 2007 Hillsdale Relays, Leon ran the men's 10,000 meters in 30:06.54.

=== Post-collegiate ===
After college, Leon took a brief hiatus from high-volume training for a period of two years until he began training for the marathon in 2009. He made his marathon debut at the 2010 Eugene Marathon, where he won in 2:23:15. He then qualified for the 2012 US Olympic Trials after running the marathon at the 2010 USA Marathon Championships in 2:18:29. The following year, he moved to Eugene, Oregon, where he joined Team Run Eugene and signed a professional contract with Mizuno. During the summer of 2015, he earned his first call-up to the United States' distance roster for the 2015 Pan American Games, where he finished in 5th place overall in the men's marathon.
