= Solonei da Silva =

Brazilian marathon runner

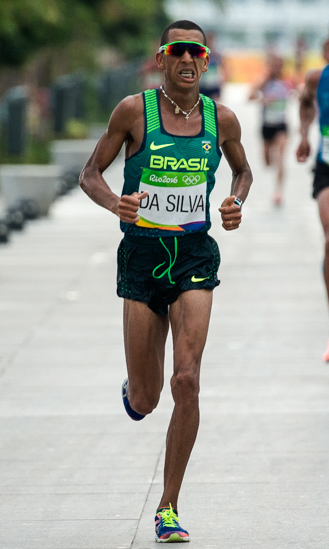
- Da Silva at the 2016 Olympics

Personal information
- Born: April 18, 1982 (age 44) Penápolis, São Paulo

Sport
- Country: Brazil
- Sport: Athletics
- Event: Distance running
Medal record
Men's athletics
Representing Brazil
Pan American Games
Gold medal – first place	2011 Guadalajara	Marathon
South American Championships
Gold medal – first place	2013 Cartagena	10,000 m

Solonei Rocha da Silva (born 18 April 1982 in Penápolis, São Paulo) is a Brazilian long-distance runner who competes in marathon races. He has a personal best of 2:11:32 hours and won the gold medal in the marathon at the 2011 Pan American Games.

Da Silva worked as a waste collector in Penápolis during his twenties and it was not until 2009, at the age of 27, that he became interested in athletics. Upon the suggestion of his wife, he entered a local race held in honor of Saint Francis of Assisi. Although it was his first attempt at competing over long distances, he surprised himself by finishing in third place.

The following year he entered a 10,000 metres track race in Rio de Janeiro and won in a time of 29:39.72 minutes. At the São Paulo Half Marathon Corpore in April 2010 he came third, then he stepped up in distance to make his debut in the full marathon a month later. He surprised the field at the Porto Alegre Marathon by winning on his first attempt in a time of 2:15:45 hours. Under the guidance of two-time Olympian Clodoaldo do Carmo, da Silva represented Esporte Clube Pinheiros in the 10,000 m at the Troféu Brasil de Atletismo (the Brazilian championships) and came fourth at his first national level event.

He began his 2011 season by winning his first South American title as he defeated fellow Brazilian Gládson Barbosa with a sprint finish in the men's 12 km race at the South American Cross Country Championships in Asunción, Paraguay. In March he ran in his first race in Europe: he was the first non-African finisher at the Lisbon Half Marathon, where he came tenth in a time of 1:04:10 hours. He then travelled to Italy to compete at the Padua Marathon and he ran a personal best of 2:11:32 hours to finish fourth behind Kenya's Peter Kimeli Some. Da Silva returned to Brazil and later that year placed fourth nationally in both the 5000 metres and 10,000 m (including a personal best of 14:12.81 minutes in the former event).

His performances in the marathon gained him selection for the Brazilian team at the 2011 Pan American Games. He entered the competition with the fastest time and delivered on this by winning the gold medal in a time of 2:16:37 hours, having over half a minute to spare over runner-up Diego Colorado of Colombia. This made it a fourth consecutive win for Brazil in the men's Pan American marathon, following on from victories by Vanderlei de Lima and Franck de Almeida.

He was invited to the 2012 London Marathon and came eighteenth. A better performance followed in June's São Paulo, which he won in a time of 2:12:25.
