= Eric Keddo =

Jamaican hurdler (born 1984)

Personal information
- Full name: Eric Errol Keddo
- Nickname: Coach Keddo
- Born: 1 July 1984 (age 41) Texas, United States
- Height: 1.86 m (6 ft 1 in)
- Weight: 77 kg (170 lb)

Sport
- Country: Jamaica
- Sport: Athletics
- Event: Hurdling
- Updated on 21 December 2014

Eric Errol Keddo (born 1 July 1984) is a Jamaican hurdler who specializes in the 110 metres hurdles.

Keddo competed for the Savannah State Tigers track and field team in the NCAA.

He competed at the 2010 Commonwealth Games where he placed 4th in the 110 meter hurdles missing bronze by 0.01 seconds. Also in 2010, he finished second at the 2010 Central American and Caribbean Games. In 2011, he won the gold medal at the 2011 Central American and Caribbean Championships with a personal best of 13.49 seconds.

== Personal bests ==
His personal best time, in the 110 meter hurdles, is 13.49 seconds.

=== Outdoor ===
- 200 m: 21.57 s (wind: +1.1 m/s) – Charlotte, United States, 11 April 2009
- 400 m: 48.92 s – Columbia, United States, 31 March 2007
- 110 m hurdles: 13.49 s (wind: +0.7 m/s) – Mayagüez, Puerto Rico, 17 July 2011
- 400 m hurdles: 51.15 s – Atlanta, United States, 14 May 2005

=== Indoor ===
- 60 m hurdles: 7.65 s – Clemson, United States, 13 February 2009

== Competition record ==
Year	Competition	Venue	Position	Event	Notes
Representing Jamaica
2007	Pan American Games	Rio de Janeiro, Brazil	6th	110 m hurdles	13.91
2009	Central American and Caribbean Championships	Havana, Cuba	5th	110 m hurdles	13.67
2010	Central American and Caribbean Games	Mayagüez, Puerto Rico	2nd	110 m hurdles	13.52
2010	Commonwealth Games	Delhi, India	4th	110 m hurdles	13.71
2011	Central American and Caribbean Championships	Mayagüez, Puerto Rico	1st	110 m hurdles	13.92
2011	Pan American Games	Guadalajara, Mexico	12th (h)	110 m hurdles	13.83
2012	World Indoor Championships	Istanbul, Turkey	22nd (h)	110 m hurdles	7.96
2013	Central American and Caribbean Championships	Morelia, Mexico	5th	110 m hurdles	13.92
2014	Central American and Caribbean Games	Xalapa, Mexico	7th	110m hurdles	14.53 A (wind: +0.7 m/s)
