= Carlos Cordero (runner) =

Mexican long-distance runner

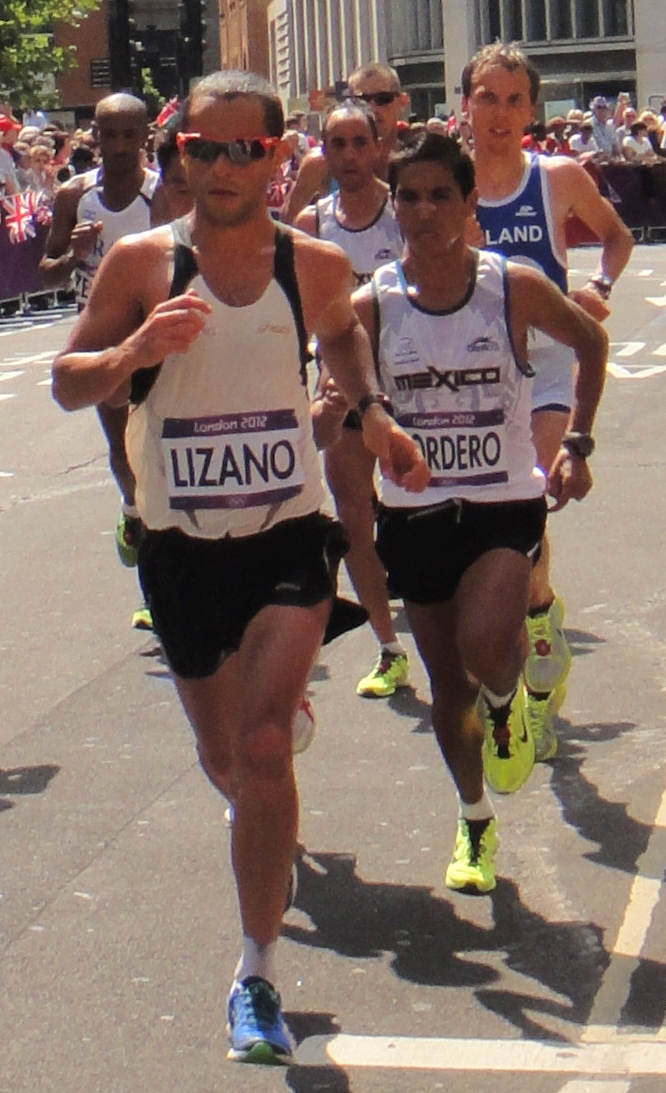
- Carlos Cordero (right) at the 2012 Summer Olympics

Personal information
- Born: January 7, 1977 (age 49)
- Height: 1.59 m (5 ft 2 1/2 in)
- Weight: 54 kg (119 lb)

Sport
- Country: Mexico
- Sport: Athletics
- Event: Marathon
Medal record
Central American and Caribbean Games
Silver medal – second place	2010 Mayagüez	1500 m

Carlos Cordero Gómez (born January 7, 1977, in Irapuato, Guanajuato) is a Mexican athlete. He participated at the 2008 Summer Olympics finishing 32nd in the men's Marathon. and he also represented Mexico at the 2012 Summer Olympics.

He won a silver medal in the 1500 metres at the 2010 Central American and Caribbean Games.

== Achievements ==
Year	Competition	Venue	Position	Event	Notes
2010	2010 Central American and Caribbean Games	Mayagüez, Puerto Rico	2nd	Marathon	2:22.06
2011	2011 Pan American Games	Guadalajara, Mexico	6th	Marathon	2:20:49
2008	2008 Summer Olympics	Beijing, China	32nd	Marathon	2:18:40
2009	2009 World Championships in Athletics	Berlin, Germany	49th	Marathon	2:22:16
2012	2012 Summer Olympics	London, United Kingdom	60th	Marathon	2:22:08
