= Marcos Pérez (footballer, born 1993) =

Argentine footballer

Personal information
- Full name: Marcos Leonel Pérez
- Date of birth: 10 May 1993 (age 33)
- Place of birth: Rosario, Argentina
- Height: 1.78 m (5 ft 10 in)
- Position: Midfielder

Team information
- Current team: Deportivo Madryn

Senior career*
Years	Team	Apps	(Gls)
2011–2017	Newell's Old Boys	4	(0)
2014–2015	→ Gimnasia y Esgrima (loan)	10	(1)
2016–2017	→ Guillermo Brown (loan)	26	(0)
2017–2018	Sportivo Belgrano	19	(1)
2018–	Deportivo Madryn	0	(0)
- * Club domestic league appearances and goals as of 18:48, 8 September 2018 (UTC)

Marcos Leonel Pérez (born 10 May 1993) is an Argentine footballer who plays as a midfielder for Deportivo Madryn.

== Career ==
Pérez's career got started with Newell's Old Boys of the Argentine Primera División. He made his career debut on 6 November 2011 during a defeat to Unión Santa Fe. In total, Pérez made four appearances for Newell's Old Boys in his first three seasons. In June 2014, Pérez was loaned to Primera B Nacional's Gimnasia y Esgrima. He didn't feature throughout the 2016 campaign, but did score one goal in ten games during 2016–17. On 21 January 2016, Pérez joined Guillermo Brown on loan. He went on to play twenty-seven times for Guillermo Brown, including his debut on 24 April versus Crucero del Norte.

August 2017 saw Pérez leave Newell's Old Boys permanently to join Torneo Federal A side Sportivo Belgrano. His debut for the club arrived on 17 September in a 2–1 win against Gimnasia y Esgrima (CdU), prior to scoring his first goal in his seventeenth appearance on 25 February 2018 versus Chaco For Ever. On 22 July 2018, Pérez signed for Deportivo Madryn on loan.

== Career statistics ==
As of 8 September 2018.

Club statistics
Club	Season	League			Cup (Note: Includes the Copa Argentina)		League Cup		Continental (Note: Includes the Copa Libertadores)		Other		Total	
Club	Season	Division	Apps	Goals	Apps	Goals	Apps	Goals	Apps	Goals	Apps	Goals	Apps	Goals
Newell's Old Boys	2011–12	Primera División	2	0	0	0	—		—		0	0	2	0
Newell's Old Boys	2012–13	Primera División	0	0	0	0	—		0	0	0	0	0	0
Newell's Old Boys	2013–14	Primera División	2	0	0	0	—		0	0	0	0	2	0
Newell's Old Boys	2014	Primera División	0	0	0	0	—		—		0	0	0	0
Newell's Old Boys	2015	Primera División	0	0	0	0	—		—		0	0	0	0
Newell's Old Boys	2016	Primera División	0	0	0	0	—		—		0	0	0	0
Newell's Old Boys	2016–17	Primera División	0	0	0	0	—		—		0	0	0	0
Newell's Old Boys	Total		4	0	0	0	—		0	0	0	0	4	0
Gimnasia y Esgrima (loan)	2014	Primera B Nacional	0	0	0	0	—		—		0	0	0	0
Gimnasia y Esgrima (loan)	2015	Primera B Nacional	10	1	1	0	—		—		0	0	11	1
Gimnasia y Esgrima (loan)	Total		10	1	1	0	—		—		0	0	11	1
Guillermo Brown (loan)	2016	Primera B Nacional	6	0	0	0	—		—		0	0	6	0
Guillermo Brown (loan)	2016–17	Primera B Nacional	20	0	1	0	—		—		0	0	21	0
Guillermo Brown (loan)	Total		26	0	1	0	—		—		0	0	27	0
Sportivo Belgrano	2017–18	Torneo Federal A	19	1	3	0	—		—		6 (Note: Six appearances in 2017–18 Torneo Federal A play-offs)	1 (Note: One goal in 2017–18 Torneo Federal A play-offs)	28	2
Deportivo Madryn	2018–19	Torneo Federal A	0	0	0	0	—		—		0	0	0	0
Career total			59	2	5	0	—		0	0	6	1	70	3
