= Athletics at the 2007 Pan American Games – Men's marathon =

Men's marathon at the Pan American Games

The men's marathon event at the 2007 Pan American Games was held on July 29.

== Results ==
Rank	Name	Nationality	Time	Notes
1st place, gold medalist(s)	Franck Caldeira	Brazil	2:14:03	
2nd place, silver medalist(s)	José Amado García	Guatemala	2:14:27	
3rd place, bronze medalist(s)	Procopio Franco	Mexico	2:15:18	
4	Jacob Frey	United States	2:16:44	
5	Luis Fonseca	Venezuela	2:17:04	
6	Chris Lundstrom	United States	2:18:05	
7	Diego Colorado	Colombia	2:20:01	
8	Francisco Bautista	Mexico	2:21:05	
9	Alfredo Arevalo	Guatemala	2:21:48	
10	Silvio Guerra	Ecuador	2:22:38	
11	José Alejandro Semprún	Venezuela	2:30:21	
12	Cristian Villavicencio	Nicaragua	2:32:26	
13	William Bohlke	United States Virgin Islands	2:45:08	
	Vanderlei de Lima	Brazil	DNF	
	Norbert Gutierrez	Cuba	DNF	
