= Diego Colorado =

Colombian long-distance runner (born 1973)

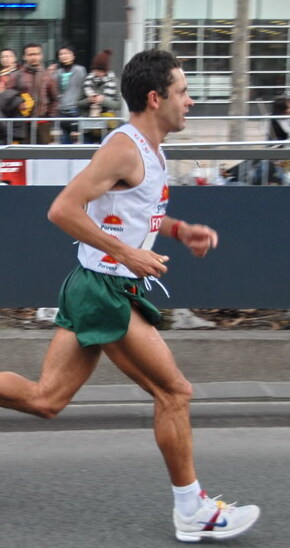
- Colorado in the 2008 Rotterdam Marathon

Personal information
- Full name: Diego Alberto Colorado Agudelo
- Born: 31 August 1973 (age 52) Jardín, Antioquia, Colombia
- Height: 1.71 m (5 ft 7 in)
- Weight: 57 kg (126 lb)

Sport
- Country: Colombia
- Sport: Men's Athletics
- Event: Long-distance running
Medal record
Men's athletics
Representing Colombia
Pan American Games
Silver medal – second place	2011 Guadalajara	Marathon
Bronze medal – third place	2003 Santo Domingo	Marathon
Bolivarian Games
Gold medal – first place	2005 Armenia	Half marathon
Gold medal – first place	2009 Sucre	Half marathon
Silver medal – second place	2001 Ambato	10,000 m
Bronze medal – third place	2001 Ambato	5,000 m
South American Championships
Bronze medal – third place	2005 Cali	10,000 m
CAC Championships
Silver medal – second place	2008 Cali	10,000 m
- Updated on 1 May 2014

Diego Alberto Colorado (born 31 August 1973) is a Colombian long-distance runner. He represented his country in the marathon at the 2001 World Championships in Athletics, taking 32nd place. He has won medals on the track over 10,000 metres, taking bronze at the 2005 South American Championships in Athletics and silver at the 2008 CAC Championships.

In October 2011, he won the silver medal in the men's marathon event at the 2011 Pan American Games in Guadalajara, Mexico, clocking a total time of 2:17:13, behind Brazil's Solonei Silva (2:16.37) and before the bronze winner, fellow Colombian Juan Carlos Cardona (2:18:20). He also won the bronze medal in the men's marathon event at the 2003 Pan American Games in Santo Domingo, Dominican Republic, clocking a total time of 2:21.48, behind Brazil's Vanderlei de Lima (2:19:08) and Canada's Bruce Deacon (2:20:35).

He was the first South American home at the 2011 Bogotá Half Marathon, taking fourth place behind East African opposition.

== Personal bests ==
- 5000 m: 14:23.84 – Santander de Quilichao, Colombia, 17 November 2012
- 10,000 m: 29:10.75 – Santiago, Chile, 13 March 2014
- Half marathon: 1:03:09 – Medellín, Colombia, 4 October 1997
- Marathon: 2:16:48 – Nashville, United States, 29 April 2000

== Achievements ==
Year	Competition	Venue	Position	Event	Notes
Representing Colombia
1998	South American Cross Country Championships	Artur Nogueira, Brazil	3rd	12 km	38:23
1998	South American Cross Country Championships	Artur Nogueira, Brazil	2nd	Team - 12 km	19 pts
1998	World Cross Country Championships	Marrakesh, Morocco	67th	12 km (Long race)	36:55
1998	World Half Marathon Championships	Uster, Switzerland	—	Half marathon	DNF
2000	World Half Marathon Championships	Veracruz, Mexico	23rd	Half marathon	1:06:27
2001	World Championships in Athletics	Edmonton, Canada	32nd	Marathon	2:26:13
2001	Bolivarian Games	Ambato, Ecuador	3rd	5,000 m	14:59.16 A
2001	Bolivarian Games	Ambato, Ecuador	2nd	10,000 m	31:17.36 A
2002	Central American and Caribbean Games	San Salvador, El Salvador	4th	10,000 m	29:46.03
2003	Pan American Games	Santo Domingo, Dominican Republic	3rd	Marathon	2:21:48
2005	South American Championships	Cali, Colombia	3rd	10,000 m	30:15.55
2005	Bolivarian Games	Armenia, Colombia	1st	Half marathon	1:07:18 GR A
2006	Central American and Caribbean Games	Cartagena, Colombia	4th	Marathon	2:30:19
2007	Pan American Games	Rio de Janeiro, Brazil	7th	Marathon	2:20:01
2007	World Road Running Championships	Udine, Italy	59th	Half marathon	1:04:18
2008	Central American and Caribbean Championships	Cali, Colombia	2nd	10,000 m	29:41.88
2009	Bolivarian Games	Sucre, Bolivia	1st	Half marathon	1:09:25 A
2010	Central American and Caribbean Games	Mayagüez, Puerto Rico	4th	10,000 m	29:53.43
2011	Pan American Games	Guadalajara, Mexico	2nd	Marathon	2:17:13
2013	Bolivarian Games	Trujillo, Peru	1st	Half marathon	1:06:16
2014	South American Games	Santiago, Chile	3rd	10,000 m	29:10.75
2017	Bolivarian Games	Santa Marta, Colombia	2nd	Half marathon	1:07:15
