= Athletics at the 2007 Pan American Games – Men's 110 metres hurdles =

Men's 110 metres hurdles at the Pan American Games

The men's 110 metres hurdles event at the 2007 Pan American Games was held on July 27–28.

== Medalists ==
Gold	Silver	Bronze
Dayron Robles; Cuba	David Payne; United States	Yoel Hernández; Cuba

== Results ==
=== Heats ===
Qualification: First 2 of each heat (Q) and the next 2 fastest (q) qualified for the final.

Wind:
Heat 1: +0.1 m/s, Heat 2: -0.2 m/s, Heat 3: +0.4 m/s

Rank	Heat	Name	Nationality	Time	Notes
1	1	Anselmo da Silva	Brazil	13.56	Q
2	1	Dayron Robles	Cuba	13.58	Q
3	1	Ryan Brathwaite	Barbados	13.61	q, PB
4	1	Bashir Ramzy	United States	13.61	q, PB
5	1	Dudley Dorival	Haiti	13.64	SB
6	2	David Payne	United States	13.77	Q
7	1	Jared MacLeod	Canada	13.78	
8	2	Eric Keddo	Jamaica	13.79	Q
9	2	Enrique Llanos	Puerto Rico	13.89	
10	3	Yoel Hernández	Cuba	13.91	Q
11	3	Hector Cotto	Puerto Rico	13.92	Q
12	2	Éder Antonio Souza	Brazil	13.93	
13	3	Stephen Jones	Barbados	13.94	SB
14	3	Jorge McFarlane	Peru	14.18	PB
15	2	Mikel Thomas	Trinidad and Tobago	14.29	
16	2	Francisco Castro	Chile	14.46	
17	3	Ronald Bennett	Honduras	14.47	
18	1	Christopher Bethel	Bahamas	14.90	
	2	Shamar Sands	Bahamas	DQ	
	3	Maurice Wignall	Jamaica	DNS	

=== Final ===
Wind: +0.4 m/s

Rank	Lane	Name	Nationality	Time	Notes
1st place, gold medalist(s)	6	Dayron Robles	Cuba	13.25	
2nd place, silver medalist(s)	5	David Payne	United States	13.43	
3rd place, bronze medalist(s)	3	Yoel Hernández	Cuba	13.50	
4	1	Ryan Brathwaite	Barbados	13.70	
5	4	Anselmo da Silva	Brazil	13.72	
6	2	Eric Keddo	Jamaica	13.91	
7	8	Bashir Ramzy	United States	14.09	
8	7	Hector Cotto	Puerto Rico	14.09	
