= Raúl Pacheco =

Peruvian long-distance runner

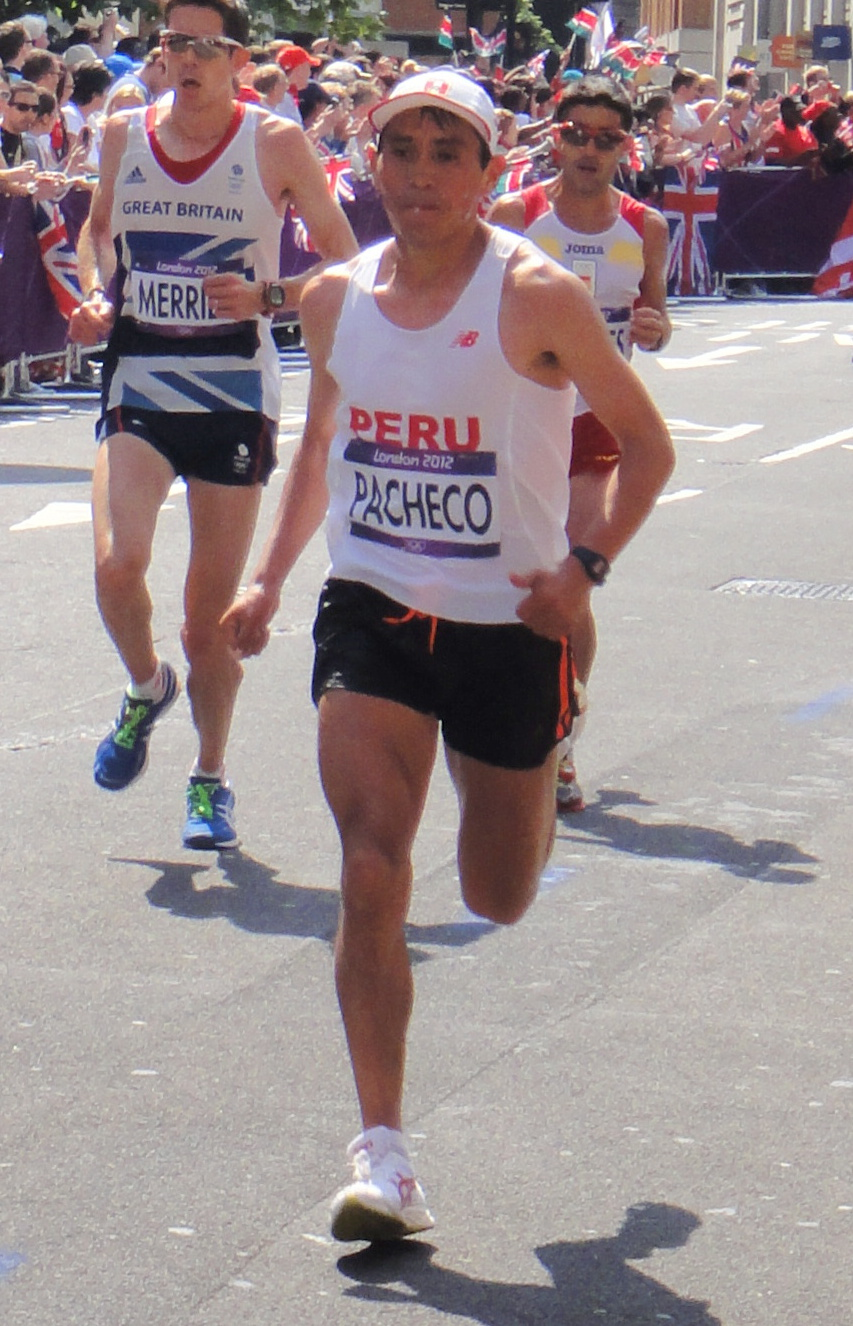
- Pacheco in the marathon at the 2012 Summer Olympics in London

Personal information
- Born: April 26, 1979 (age 47) Santa Fe de Jauja
- Height: 1.68 m (5 ft 6 in)
- Weight: 57 kg (126 lb)

Sport
- Country: Peru
- Sport: Athletics
- Event: Marathon
Medal record
Representing Peru
Pan American Games
Silver medal – second place	2015 Toronto	Marathon

Raúl Manuel Pacheco Mendoza (born 26 April 1979) is a Peruvian long-distance runner. He was born in Santa Fe de Jauja. He competed at the 2012 Summer Olympics in the men's marathon, finishing in 21st place. Raul Pacheco placed 6th at the Rotterdam Marathon (2:11:01) in 2015, set a new national record and qualified for the Rio 2016 Summer Olympics. In July 2015, he placed second in the Toronto Pan American Games with a time of 2:17:13, and took home Peru's inaugural medal in a marathon at the Pan American games.
