= 2016 Central American Championships in Athletics =

XXVII Central American Championships in Athletics
- Dates: 17–19 June
- Host city: San Salvador, El Salvador
- Venue: Estadio Jorge "Mágico" González
- Level: Senior
- Events: 44
- Participation: 7 nations

The 27th Central American Championships in Athletics were held at the Estadio Jorge "Mágico" González in San Salvador, El Salvador, between 17 and 19 June 2016.

A total of 44 events were contested, 22 by men, 22 by women.

== Medal summary ==
=== Men ===
Event	Gold		Silver		Bronze	
100 metres (wind: -1.1 m/s)	Arturo Deliser; Panama	10.49	Steve Maturin; Costa Rica	10.87	Shaun Gill; Belize	10.97
200 metres (wind: +1.2 m/s)	Arturo Deliser; Panama	21.15	Joel Lynch; Panama	21.34	Joseph Norales; Honduras	21.39
400 metres	Joel Lynch; Panama	47.31	Sherman Guity; Costa Rica	47.42	George Erazo; Guatemala	48.41
800 metres	Zinedine Selis; Costa Rica	1:52.39	Joseph Acevedo; Panama	1:54.03	Georman Rivas; Costa Rica	1:54.05
1500 metres	Walter Yac; Guatemala	3:52.78 CR	Erik Rodríguez; Nicaragua	3:54.12	Georman Rivas; Costa Rica	3:56.44
5000 metres	Mario Pacay; Guatemala	14:35.1	Williams Julajúj; Guatemala	14:37.0	Alberto González; Guatemala	14:37.2
10,000 metres	Walter Yac; Guatemala	30:27.33	Williams Julajúj; Guatemala	30:33.67	Alberto González; Guatemala	31:36.24
110 metres hurdles (wind: -1.6 m/s)	Wienstan Mena; Guatemala	14.75	Ronald Benneth; Honduras	14.86	William Ríos; Panama	14.91
400 metres hurdles	Gerald Drummond; Costa Rica	51.35	Emmanuel Niño; Costa Rica	51.48	José Humberto Bermúdez; Guatemala	52.82
3000 metres steeplechase	Erick Rodríguez; Nicaragua	9:14.27	José Enrique Calvo; Costa Rica	9:23.71	Álvaro Vásquez; Nicaragua	9:24.43
4 × 100 metres relay	Panama; Arturo Deliser; Chamar Chambers; Joel Lynch; Juan Mosquera	41.91	Belize; James Bregal; Brandon Jones; Shaun Gill; Mark Anderson	42.13	Honduras; Lester Enamorado; Vicente Aranda; Ronald Benneth; Joseph Norales	42.26
4 × 400 metres relay	Costa Rica; Emmanuel Niño; Zinedine Selis; Gerald Drummond; Sherman Guity	3:12.08 CR	Panama; Joel Lynch; Arturo Deliser; Joseph Acevedo; Chamar Chambers	3:17.34	El Salvador; Juan Carlos Rodríguez; George Erazo; René Perla; Ronal Moreno	3:17.61
20,000 metres track walk	Gabriel Calvo; Costa Rica	1:30:59.85	Ángel Batz; Guatemala	1:34:32.36	Gerson Navas; El Salvador	1:36:58.62
High jump	William Ríos; Panama	2.16 CR	Ken Franzuá; Guatemala	2.05	Francisco Rodríguez; El Salvador	1.93
Pole vault	Natán Rivera; El Salvador	4.80 CR	Pedro Figueroa; El Salvador	4.50	Edward Cruz; El Salvador	4.10
Long jump	Juan Mosquera; Panama	7.67w	Nicolás Arriola; Guatemala	7.13	Ángel Suárez; Nicaragua	7.12
Triple jump	Brandon Jones; Belize	16.22 CR	Emmanuel Arias; Panama	15.34	Jason Castro; Honduras	15.31
Shot put	Billy López; Guatemala	15.10	Hugo González; Guatemala	14.39	Diego Berrros; Guatemala	13.61
Discus throw	Winston Campbell; Honduras	49.03	Ever Acajabón; Guatemala	43.57	Enrique Martínez; El Salvador	40.39
Hammer throw	Diego Berrros; Guatemala	61.50	Alejandro Arroyo; Costa Rica	53.07	Kevin Linares; El Salvador	50.25
Javelin throw	Luis Taracena; Guatemala	68.45	Pablo Siliézar; El Salvador	55.81	Bryan Valle; Honduras	47.72
Decathlon	Ronald Ramírez; Guatemala	6353	André Campos; Costa Rica	5958	Youssef Qasem; Guatemala	5714

=== Women ===
Event	Gold		Silver		Bronze	
100 metres (wind: -0.3 m/s)	Kaina Martínez; Belize	11.56 CR	Yasmin Woodruff; Panama	11.71	Shantely Scott; Costa Rica	12.09
200 metres (wind: +1.8 m/s)	Yasmin Woodruff; Panama	23.49 CR	Kaina Martínez; Belize	23.68	Ruth Hunt; Panama	24.52
400 metres	Desiré Bermúduez; Costa Rica	54.39 CR	Daniela Rojas; Costa Rica	56.26	Leyka Archibold; Panama	57.77
800 metres	Viviana Aroche; Guatemala	2:19.53	Mónica Vargas; Costa Rica	2:19.62	Irma Aldana; El Salvador	2:19.72
1500 metres	Mónica Vargas; Costa Rica	4:35.91	Rosa Del Toro; El Salvador	4:38.11	Evelyn Chávez; Guatemala	4:39.21
5000 metres	Rosa Del Toro; El Salvador	17:31.22 CR	Evelyn Chávez; Guatemala	17:50.60	Gabriela Traña; Costa Rica	18:43.72
10,000 metres	Evelyn Chávez; Guatemala	37:31.78	Rosa Del Toro; El Salvador	38:58.27	Cindy Monterroso; Guatemala	40:10.59
100 metres hurdles (wind: -0.4 m/s)	Andrea Vargas; Costa Rica	14.10	Alexia Neal; Belize	15.08	Iris Santamaría; El Salvador	15.17
400 metres hurdles	Daniela Rojas; Costa Rica	59.52	Desiré Bermúduez; Costa Rica	60.37	Leyka Archibold; Panama	63.04
3000 metres steeplechase	Brenda Salmerón; El Salvador	11:48.33	Irma Aldana; El Salvador	12:08.03	Josselyn Grijalva; El Salvador	12:33.81
4 × 100 metres relay	Belize; Faith Morris; Kaina Martínez; Tricia Flores; Samantha Dirks	46.61 CR	Costa Rica; Nathalee Aranda; Yasmin Woodruff; Leyka Archibold; Ruth Hunt	48.36	El Salvador; Nancy Sandoval; Iris Santamaría; Mariella Mena; Lauren Velásquez	48.72
4 × 400 metres relay	Costa Rica; María Alejandra Murillo; Daniela Rojas; Shantely Scott; Dessiré Bermúdez	3:49.70	El Salvador; Lauren Velásquez; Irma Aldana; Iris Santamaría; Valeria López	4:02.30	Only two finishing teams	
10,000 metres track walk	Yesenia Miranda; El Salvador	49:06.47	Arely Morales; Guatemala	53:08.04	Karin Vicente; Guatemala	53:49.53
High jump	Kashany Ríos; Panama	1.75	Ana María Martínez; Panama	1.66	Abigail Obando; Costa Rica	1.50
Pole vault	Andrea Velasco; El Salvador	3.40 CR	Fátima Soto; El Salvador	3.20	Only two finishers	
Long jump	Tricia Flores; Belize	5.95 CR	Nathalee Aranda; Panama	5.88	Ana María Porras; Costa Rica	5.56
Triple jump	Thelma Fuentes; Guatemala	12.62	Ana María Martínez; Panama	12.27	Ashantie Carr; Belize	12.04
Shot put	Itohan Aikhionbare; Belize	15.67 CR	Aixa Middleton; Panama	12.27	Naomy Smith; Costa Rica	10.96
Discus throw	Aixa Middleton; Panama	50.66	Itohan Aikhionbare; Belize	47.40	Alma Gutiérrez; Guatemala	40.28
Hammer throw	Sonja Moreno; Guatemala	45.31	Viviana Abarca; Costa Rica	41.73	María José Soto; El Salvador	37.66
Javelin throw	Dalila Rugama; Nicaragua	48.00	Genova Arias; Costa Rica	45.87	Sofía Alonso; Guatemala	42.30
Heptathlon	Katy Sealy; Belize	4817 CR	Priscilla Montero; Costa Rica	4026	Abigail Obando; Costa Rica	3966

== Medal table ==
* Host nation (El Salvador)

Rank	Nation	Gold	Silver	Bronze	Total
1	Guatemala (GUA)	12	9	11	32
2	Costa Rica (CRC)	9	13	8	30
3	Panama (PAN)	9	9	4	22
4	Belize	6	4	2	12
5	El Salvador (ESA)*	5	7	11	23
6	Nicaragua (NCA)	2	1	2	5
7	Honduras	1	1	4	6
Totals (7 entries)		44	44	42	130
