= 2017 Central American Championships in Athletics =

XXVIII Central American Championships in Athletics
- Dates: 30 June – 2 July
- Host city: Tegucigalpa, Honduras
- Venue: Estadio Olímpico José Simón Azcona
- Level: Senior
- Events: 44
- Participation: 7 nations

The 2017 Central American Championships in Athletics was the 28th edition of the annual competition in athletics organized by the CADICA. It was held from 30 June to 2 July 2017 in the Estadio Olímpico José Simón Azcona in Tegucigalpa, Honduras. A total of 230 athletes representing 7 different nations competed at the Championships. The Most Valuable Player of the Championships was Samantha Dirks of Belize.

== Background ==
The Central American Championships in Athletics is an annual athletics competition organised by the Confederación Atlética del Istmo Centroamericano (CADICA). This edition of the Championships marked the 28th edition of the competition. It was held from 30 June to 2 July 2017. It was held in the Estadio Olímpico José Simón Azcona in Tegucigalpa, Honduras. A total of 44 events were held during the Championships; 22 for the men and 22 for the women.

=== Participants ===
A total of 230 athletes representing 7 different nations competed at the Championships.

- Belize (20)
- Costa Rica (41)
- El Salvador (38)
- Guatemala (27)
- Honduras (28)
- Nicaragua (35)
- Panama (42)

== Medal summary ==
=== Men ===
One championship record in the men's events was set during the competition. Guatemala had the most gold medals in the men's events with six gold medals. Gerald Drummond of Costa Rica was the best male athlete of the competition after he had won three gold medals in the men's events.

Event	Gold		Silver		Bronze	
100 metres (wind: -0.4 m/s)	Mateo Edward; Panama	10.52	Rolando Palacios; Honduras	10.55	Shermal Calimore; Costa Rica	10.70
200 metres (wind: -0.3 m/s)	Shermal Calimore; Costa Rica	21.30	Virjilio Griggs; Belize	21.39	Brandon Jones; Belize	21.42
400 metres	Gerald Drummond; Costa Rica	46.76	Sherman Guity; Costa Rica	46.82	José Humberto Bermúdez; Guatemala	47.83
800 metres	Chamar Chambers; Panama	1:50.58	Juan Diego Castro; Costa Rica	1:51.12	Josué Murcia; Costa Rica	1:51.18
1500 metres	Erik Rodríguez; Nicaragua	3:58.65	Georman Rivas; Costa Rica	3:58.73	Juan Diego Castro; Costa Rica	3:59.67
5000 metres	Walter Yac; Guatemala	15:25.01	Julio Avilés; Costa Rica	15:26.51	Pedro Chacón; Costa Rica	15:6.55
10,000 metres	Williams Julajúj; Guatemala	?	Mario Sucup; Guatemala	?	Daniel Johanning; Costa Rica	?
110 metres hurdles (wind: -0.9 m/s)	José Adalberto Chorro; El Salvador	15.03	Gino Toscano; Panama	15.04	Ronald Ramírez; Guatemala	15.72
400 metres hurdles	Gerald Drummond; Costa Rica	51.43	José Humberto Bermúdez; Guatemala	51.48	Pablo Andrés Ibáñez; El Salvador	52.81
3000 metres steeplechase	Erick Rodríguez; Nicaragua	9:16.69	Álvaro Vázquez; Nicaragua	9:31.34	David Escobar; El Salvador	9:34.19
4 × 100 metres relay	Belize; Shaun Gill; Brandon Jones; Mark Anderson; Rahim Monsanto	41.54	El Salvador; José Adalberto Chorro; Ronal Moreno; José David Braghieri; Juan Carlos Rodríguez	41.36	Honduras; Calet Isaula; Josef Norales; Vicente Aranda; Rolando Palacios	41.64
4 × 400 metres relay	Costa Rica; Josué Murcia; Shermal Calimore; Sherman Guity; Gerald Drummond	3:16.63	Panama; Jaime Smith; Joseph Acevedo; Virjilio Griggs; Chamar Chambers	3:18.29	Guatemala; Rodrigo Garnica; Byron Herrera; Wesly Gregorio; José Humberto Bermúdez	3:18.53
20,000 metres track walk	Jurgen Grave; Guatemala	1:27:03.62	José Gregorio Ajcam; Guatemala	1:28:36.29	Ángel Batz; Guatemala	1:29:05.55
High jump	Alexander Bowen; Panama	2.17 CR	Jaime Escobar; Panama	2.10	William Ríos; Panama	2.05
Pole vault	Natán Rivera; El Salvador	4.70	Pedro Figueroa; El Salvador	4.65	Christian Higueros; Guatemala	3.80
Long jump	Jhamal Bowen; Panama	7.33	Rolando Pinzón; Panama	7.30	Juan Mosquera; Panama	7.22
Triple jump	Brandon Jones; Belize	15.40	Jason Castro; Honduras	15.33	Becker Jarquín; Nicaragua	14.79
Shot put	Billy López; Guatemala	14.61	Winston Campbell; Honduras	13.48	Luis Iván Sandoval; Panama	13.36
Discus throw	Winston Campbell; Honduras	49.35	Oscar Márquez; El Salvador	40.97	Enrique Martínez; El Salvador	40.19
Hammer throw	Diego Berríos; Guatemala	55.30	Enrique Martínez; El Salvador	52.19	Kevin Linares; El Salvador	49.78
Javelin throw	Luis Taracena; Guatemala	69.35	Jonathan Cedeño; Panama	61.85	Rowe Miranda; Panama	58.76
Decathlon	Jorge Luis Mena; Panama	5612	Jorge Luis Castillo; Panama	5174	Edgar Nieto; Panama	5077

=== Women ===
Two championship records were set during the women's events of the championships. Panama had the most gold medals in the women's events with seven gold medals. Samantha Dirks of Belize was awarded as the Most Valuable Player of the competition and the best female athlete during the competition after she had earned three gold medals.

Event	Gold		Silver		Bronze	
100 metres (wind: -2.1 m/s)	Nathalee Aranda; Panama	12.07	Tricia Flores; Belize	12.64	Kendy Rosales; Honduras	12.73
200 metres (wind: -1.1 m/s)	Samantha Dirks; Belize	24.22	Kendy Rosales; Honduras	25.44	María Odily García; Nicaragua	26.08
400 metres	Samantha Dirks; Belize	53.54	Sharolyn Scott; Costa Rica	54.26	Desiré Bermúduez; Costa Rica	55.02
800 metres	Andrea Ferris; Panama	2:11.62	Daniela Rojas; Costa Rica	2:13.70	Asling Vásquez; Nicaragua	2:18.70
1500 metres	Andrea Ferris; Panama	4:42.22	Mónica Vargas; Costa Rica	4:45.63	Cindy Monterroso; Guatemala	4:48.63
5000 metres	Cindy Monterroso; Guatemala	18:43.30	Yelka Mairena; Nicaragua	18:58.54	Mónica Vargas; Costa Rica	19:19.44
10,000 metres	Yelka Mairena; Nicaragua	39:31.29	Cindy Monterroso; Guatemala	39:40.08	Ana Mirta Hércules; El Salvador	41:17.03
100 metres hurdles (wind: -1.0 m/s)	Andrea Vargas; Costa Rica	13.65 CR	Kayla Smith; Panama	14.40	Reymi Irvin; Panama	15.50
400 metres hurdles	Sharolyn Scott; Costa Rica	59.19	Kayla Smith; Panama	61.20	Reymi Irvin; Panama	65.73
3000 metres steeplechase	Irma Aldana; El Salvador	11:50.04	Brenda Salmerón; El Salvador	12:13.58	Chrisdyala Moraga; Costa Rica	12:59.68
4 × 100 metres relay	Belize; Faith Morrs; Tricia Flores; Hilary Gladden; Samantha Dirks	48.21	Costa Rica; Keylin Pennant; Andrea Vargas; María Alejandra Murillo; Melanie Foulkes	48.36	El Salvador; Iris Santamaría; Adriana Andrade; Mariella Mena; Nancy Sandoval	48.72
4 × 400 metres relay	Costa Rica; Sharolyn Scott; María Alejandra Murillo; Daniela Rojas; Desiré Bermúdez	3:49.87	Nicaragua; Jarey Vásquez; Asling Vásquez; María Odily García; Ingrid Narváez	3:53.67	El Salvador; Iris Santamaría; Brenda Salmerón; Adriana Andrade; Irma Aldana	4:15.80
10,000 metres track walk	Yesenia Miranda; El Salvador	51:08.41	Glenda Úbeda; Nicaragua	52:13.99	María José Blandón; Nicaragua	53:02.24
High jump	Kashany Ríos; Panama	1.66	Ana María Porras; Costa Rica	1.63	Magaly Carvajal; Costa Rica	1.60
Pole vault	Andrea Velasco; El Salvador	3.40	Fátima Soto; El Salvador	3.30	Natalie Segura; Guatemala	2.80
Long jump	Nathalee Aranda; Panama	6.21 CR	Estefany Cruz; Guatemala	5.80	Ana María Porras; Costa Rica	5.80
Triple jump	Estefany Cruz; Guatemala	12.40	Ana María Martínez; Panama	12.40	Nancy Sandoval; El Salvador	12.13
Shot put	Aixa Middleton; Panama	12.92	Dalila Rugama; Nicaragua	12.29	Naomy Smith; Costa Rica	11.47
Discus throw	Aixa Middleton; Panama	49.87	Alma Guitiérrez; Honduras	41.31	Estefanie Sosa; Guatemala	36.82
Hammer throw	Sonja Moreno; Guatemala	47.83	Dagmar Alvarado; Panama	45.03	Viviana Abarca; Costa Rica	42.87
Javelin throw	Dalila Rugama; Nicaragua	48.51	Genova Arias; Costa Rica	41.78	Sofía Alonso; Guatemala	40.90
Heptathlon	Katy Sealy; Belize	4054	Karla Molina; El Salvador	3849	Only two participants	

== Medal table ==
* Host nation ( Honduras)

Rank	Nation	Gold	Silver	Bronze	Total
1	Panama (PAN)	12	10	7	29
2	Guatemala (GUA)	8	5	9	22
3	Costa Rica (CRC)	7	10	12	29
4	Belize	6	2	1	9
5	El Salvador (ESA)	5	7	8	20
6	Nicaragua (NCA)	4	5	4	13
7	Honduras*	1	5	2	8
Totals (7 entries)		43	44	43	130
