= List of Central American Championships in Athletics records =

Central American Championships records in athletics are set by athletes competing from a range of member nations of the Confederación Atlética del Istmo Centroamericano commonly known as CADICA.

The Central American Championships in Athletics is an athletics event for athletes which began in 1958. Records are set by athletes who are representing one of the CADICA's member states. The following list of records is assembled from the CADICA website.

== Men's records ==
Event	Record	Athlete	Nationality	Date	Meet	Place	Ref.
100 m	10.25	Bob Colville	Costa Rica	October 2002	2002 Championships	San José, Costa Rica	
200 m	20.81 (+0.6 m/s)	Rolando Palacios	Honduras	21 June 2014	2014 Championships	Tegucigalpa, Honduras	
400 m	45.33	Nery Brenes	Costa Rica	27 June 2015	2015 Championships	Managua, Nicaragua	
800 m	1:47.80	Chamar Chambers	Panama	6 May 2023	2023 Championships	San José, Costa Rica	
1500 m	3:52.78	Walter Yac Colop	Guatemala	18 June 2016	2016 Championships	San Salvador, El Salvador	
5000 m	14:21.10	Rafael Ángel Pérez	Costa Rica	November 1975	1975 Championships	San José, Costa Rica	
10,000 m	28:55.38	Alberto Gónzalez	Guatemala	7 May 2023	2023 Championships	San José, Costa Rica	
110 m hurdles	13.82 (+1.2 m/s)	Ronald Bennett	Honduras	16 June 2012	2012 Championships	Managua, Nicaragua	
400 m hurdles	48.11 NR	Gerald Drummond	Costa Rica	6 May 2023	2023 Championships	San José, Costa Rica	
3000 m steeplechase	8:49.13	Didier Rodríguez	Panama	29 June 2024	2024 Championships	San Salvador, El Salvador	
High jump	2.17 m	Alexander Bowen	Panama	1 July 2017	2017 Championships	Tegucigalpa, Honduras	
Pole vault	4.80 m	Natan Rivera Alas	El Salvador	18 June 2016	2016 Championships	San Salvador, El Salvador	
Long jump	7.85 m (−0.1 m/s)	Rasheed Miller	Costa Rica	7 June 2026	2026 Championships	Managua, Nicaragua	
Triple jump	16.22 m (−1.9 m/s) NR	Brandon Jones	Belize	19 June 2016	2016 Championships	San Salvador, El Salvador	
Shot put	15.68 m	Roberto Sawyers	Costa Rica	25 June 2011	2011 Championships	San José, Costa Rica	
Discus throw	51.77 m	Winston Campbell	Honduras	7 May 2023	2023 Championships	San José, Costa Rica	
Hammer throw	70.70 m	Roberto Sawyers	Costa Rica	14 July 2018	2018 Championships	Guatemala City, Guatemala	
Javelin throw	73.22 m NR	Ivan Sibaja	Costa Rica	7 May 2023	2023 Championships	San José, Costa Rica	
Decathlon	7491 pts	Estebán Ibáñez	El Salvador	28–29 June June 2024	2024 Championships	San Salvador, El Salvador	
Decathlon	100m / Long jump / Shot put / High jump / 400m / 110m H / Discus / Pole vault / Javelin / 1500m; 10.96 (+1.6 m/s) / 7.29 m (±0.0 m/s) / 11.89 m / 2.00 m / 49.08 / 14.56 (±0.0 m/s) / 32.94 m / 4.20 m / 52.95 m / 4:29.84						
10,000 m walk (track)	43:55.30	Bryan Matías	Guatemala	27 June 2021	2021 Championships	San José, Costa Rica	
20,000 m walk	1:24:49.40	Erick Barrondo	Guatemala	28 June 2024	2024 Championships	San Salvador, El Salvador	
4 × 100 m relay	40.55 NR	Melique García; Yariel Matute; Gerom Solis; Kennith Glenn	Honduras	29 December 2020	2020 Championships	San José, Costa Rica	
4 × 400 m relay	3:12.08	Emmanuel Niño Villalta; Zinedine Selis Blanco; Gerald Drummond Hernández; Sherman Guity Guity	Costa Rica	19 June 2016	2016 Championships	San Salvador, El Salvador	

Key:
^{WR} World record	^{AR} Central American record	^{NR} National record	^{A} affected by altitude

== Women's records ==
Event	Record	Athlete	Nationality	Date	Meet	Place	Ref.
100 m	11.56 (−0.3 m/s)	Kaina Martinez	Belize	18 June 2016	2016 Championships	San Salvador, El Salvador	
200 m	23.49 (+1.8 m/s)	Yasmin Woodruff	Panama	18 June 2016	2016 Championships	San Salvador, El Salvador	
400 m	53.54	Samantha Dirks	Belize	2 July 2017	2017 Championships	Tegucigalpa, Honduras	
400 m	53.51	Carol Rodríguez	Puerto Rico	27 June 2015	2015 Championships	Managua, Nicaragua	
800 m	2:03.91	Andrea Ferris	Panama	15 June 2012	2012 Championships	Managua, Nicaragua	
1500 m	4:20.00	Andrea Ferris	Panama	16 June 2012	2012 Championships	Managua, Nicaragua	
5000 m	16:48.07	Viviana Aroche	Guatemala	28 June 2024	2024 Championships	San Salvador, El Salvador	
10,000 m	36:10.54	Gabriela Traña	Costa Rica	26 September 2004	2004 Championships	Managua, Nicaragua	
100 m hurdles	12.82 (+1.9 m/s)	Andrea Vargas	Costa Rica	28 June 2024	2024 Championships	San Salvador, El Salvador	
400 m hurdles	57.74	Daniela Rojas	Costa Rica	29 June 2024	2024 Championships	San Salvador, El Salvador	
3000 m steeplechase	10:39.19	Andrea Ferris	Panama	28 June 2015	2015 Championships	Managua, Nicaragua	
High jump	1.84 m	Kashani Ríos	Panama	16 June 2012	2012 Championships	Managua, Nicaragua	
Pole vault	3.42 m	Andrea Velasco	El Salvador	13 July 2018	2018 Championships	Guatemala City, Guatemala	
Long jump	6.36 m (+0.4 m/s)	Thelma Fuentes	Guatemala	14 July 2018	2018 Championships	Guatemala City, Guatemala	
Triple jump	13.15 m (+1.7 m/s)	Thelma Fuentes	Guatemala	13 July 2018	2018 Championships	Guatemala City, Guatemala	
Shot put	15.67 m	Itohan Aikhionbare	Belize	17 June 2016	2016 Championships	San Salvador, El Salvador	
Discus throw	55.00 m	Aixa Middleton	Panama	27 June 2015	2015 Championships	Managua, Nicaragua	
Hammer throw	56.78 m	Sabrina Gaitán	Guatemala	20 June 2014	2014 Championships	Tegucigalpa, Honduras	
Javelin throw	52.10 m	Dalila Rugama	Nicaragua	8 June 2007	2007 Championships	San José, Costa Rica	
Heptathlon	4954 pts	Ana María Porras	Costa Rica	13–14 July 2018	2018 Championships	Guatemala City, Guatemala	
Heptathlon	100m H / High jump / Shot put / 200m / Long jump / Javelin / 800m; 14.72 (+0.5 m/s) / 1.58 m / 10.65 m / 26.08 / 5.87 m (+1.3 m/s) / 31.50 m / 2:30.52						
10,000 m walk (track)	47:35.35	Cristina López	El Salvador	12 June 2009	2009 Championships	Guatemala City, Guatemala	
20,000 m walk (track)	1:33:35.3	Noelia Vargas	Costa Rica	28 June 2024	2024 Championships	San Salvador, El Salvador	
4 × 100 m relay	46.61	Faith Morris; Kaina Martinez; Tricia Flores; Samantha Dirks	Belize	18 June 2016	2016 Championships	San Salvador, El Salvador	
4 × 100 m relay	44.03	Beatriz Cruz; Celiangeli Morales; Dayleen Santana; Genoiska Cancel	Puerto Rico	27 June 2015	2015 Championships	Managua, Nicaragua	
4 × 400 m relay	3:46.69	Sharolyn Scott; Daniela Rojas Gutierrez; Irma Harris; Desiré Bermúdez	Costa Rica	14 July 2018	2018 Championships	Guatemala City, Guatemala	
4 × 400 m relay	3:35.71	Grace Claxton; Alethia Marrero; Paris García; Carol Rodríguez	Puerto Rico	28 June 2015	2015 Championships	Managua, Nicaragua	

Key:
^{WR} World record	^{AR} Central American record	^{NR} National record	^{A} affected by altitude

== See also ==
List of North, Central American and Caribbean records in athletics
