= 2023 Central American Championships in Athletics =

XXXIII Central American Championships in Athletics
- Dates: 6–7 May
- Host city: San José, Costa Rica
- Venue: Estadio Nacional
- Level: Senior
- Events: 45
- Participation: 7 nations

The 33rd Central American Championships in Athletics were held at the Estadio Nacional in San José, Costa Rica, on 6 and 7 May 2023.

A total of 45 events were contested, 22 by men, 22 by women, as well as one mixed event.

== Medal summary ==
=== Men ===
Event	Gold		Silver		Bronze	
100 metres (wind: -1.7 m/s)	Alexander Salazar; Panama	10.50	Juan Carlos Rodríguez; El Salvador	10.53	Brandon Jones; Belize	10.53
200 metres (wind: +2.4 m/s)	Yeykell Romero; Nicaragua	21.09	Alexander Salazar; Panama	21.50	Alejandro Ricketts; Panama	21.60
400 metres	Chamar Chambers; Panama	46.53	José Pablo Elizondo; Costa Rica	47.13	José René Navas; El Salvador	48.27
800 metres	Chamar Chambers; Panama	1:47.80 CR	José Pablo Elizondo; Costa Rica	1:50.96	Aaron Hernández; El Salvador	1:51.35
1500 metres	Diddier Rodríguez; Panama	3:54.18	Marcos Cruz; Guatemala	3:56.41	Julio César Avilés; Costa Rica	3:56.87
5000 metres	Mario Pacay; Guatemala	14:23.83	Daniel Johanning; Costa Rica	14:34.70	Franklin Álvarez; Guatemala	14:49.84
10,000 metres	Alberto Gónzalez; Guatemala	28:55.38 CR	Daniel Johanning; Costa Rica	30:09.06	Franklin Álvarez; Guatemala	30:44.68
110 metres hurdles (wind: +2.3 m/s)	Estebán Ibáñez; El Salvador	14.39	Gabriel Mejía; Honduras	14.80	Wienstan Mena; Guatemala	15.19
400 metres hurdles	Gerald Drummond; Costa Rica	48.11 CR NR	Pablo Andrés Ibáñez; El Salvador	48.56	Samuel Ibáñez; El Salvador	52.21
3000 metres steeplechase	Diddier Rodríguez; Panama	8:55.77	Marcos Cruz; Guatemala	9:01.67	Paulo Gómez; El Salvador	9:07.41
4 × 100 metres relay	El Salvador; Juan Rodríguez; Estebán Ibáñez; Samuel Ibáñez; Pablo Andrés Ibáñez	41.07	Costa Rica; Derick Leandro; Emmanuel Niño; Alejandro Ricketts; Héctor Allen	41.61	Belize; Joas Mejía; Mark Anderson; Gianni Jones; Brandon Jones	41.65
4 × 400 metres relay	El Salvador; Joseph Hernández; Samuel Ibáñez; Estebán Ibáñez; Pablo Andrés Ibáñez	3:09.22	Costa Rica; Derick Leandro; José Elizondo; Gary Altamirano; Gerald Drummond	3:11.02	Panama; José Demera; Diddier Rodríguez; Jhan Wisdom; Chamar Chambers	3:15.81
20,000 metres track walk	Juan Manuel Calderón; Costa Rica	1:29:51.00	José Mariano Ordóñez; Guatemala	1:35:34.77	Bryan Matías; Guatemala	1:37:26.33
High jump	David Bosquez; Panama	2.05	Estebán Ibáñez; El Salvador	1.96	Fredy Lemus; Guatemala	1.96
Pole vault	Christiaan Higueros; Guatemala	4.60	Diego Navas; El Salvador	4.50	Guillermo Rivas; Guatemala	4.30
Long jump	Rasheed Miller; Costa Rica	8.07w	Nicolás Arriola; Guatemala	7.67	Adrian Alvarado; Panama	7.60
Triple jump	Fredy Lemus; Guatemala	15.52w	Brandon Jones; Belize	15.25w	Fernando Reyes; El Salvador	15.01w
Shot put	Anselmo Delgado; Panama	14.72	Jeims Molina; Costa Rica	14.12	Only two participants	
Discus throw	Winston Campbell; Honduras	51.77 CR	Jeims Molina; Costa Rica	44.95	Alberto Peralta; Panama	34.11
Hammer throw	Dylan Suárez; Costa Rica	57.97	David Ayala; Costa Rica	57.05	Carlos Arteaga; Nicaragua	55.49
Javelin throw	Iván Sibaja; Costa Rica	73.22 CR NR	Luis Taracena; Guatemala	70.15	Jonathan Cedeño; Panama	69.50
Decathlon	Youssef Qasem; Guatemala	5585	Brainer Chavarría; Costa Rica	5352	Carlos Almendárez; Nicaragua	5218

=== Women ===
Event	Gold		Silver		Bronze	
100 metres (wind: +1.0 m/s)	María Alejandra Carmona; Nicaragua	11.93	Ivanniz Blackwood; Costa Rica	12.23	Tania Alfaro; Costa Rica	12.46
200 metres (wind: +3.7 m/s)	María Alejandra Carmona; Nicaragua	23.90	Ivanniz Blackwood; Costa Rica	25.07	Kendi Rosales; Honduras	25.18
400 metres	Tracy Joseph; Costa Rica	53.75	Desire Bermúdez; Costa Rica	53.87	Katherine Torres; Panama	58.05
800 metres	Angeline Pondler; Costa Rica	2:12.73	Débora Quel; Guatemala	2:13.43	Yency Chamur; El Salvador	2:16.02
1500 metres	Viviana Aroche; Guatemala	4:41.65	Suyeris Guerra; Panama	4:40.85	Débora Quel; Guatemala	4:42.60
5000 metres	Viviana Aroche; Guatemala	16:54.50 CR	Yessica Espinal; Honduras	17:34.53	Julay Gamboa; Costa Rica	17:36.78
10,000 metres	Yessica Espinal; Honduras	36:58.70	Priscila Solis; Costa Rica	37:27.41	Idelma Delgado; El Salvador	40:47.99
100 metres hurdles (wind: +2.5 m/s)	Nancy Sandoval; El Salvador	13.36	Leyka Archibold; Panama	14.11	Nathalie Almendárez; El Salvador	14.82
400 metres hurdles	Leyka Archibold; Panama	65.51	Naydelin Calderón; Costa Rica	67.30	Only two participants	
3000 metres steeplechase	Rolanda Bell; Panama	11:12.94	Andrea Ferris; Panama	11:21.99	Chrisdyala Moraga; Costa Rica	12:06.08
4 × 100 metres relay	Costa Rica; Tania Alfaro; Abigail Obando; Melanie Vargas; Ivanniz Blackwood	47.75	Nicaragua; Silvihna Avilés; Andrea Sosa; Irishell Villarreal; María Alejandra Carmona	49.17	Panama; Melis Ayhan; María Vargas; Ángela González; Leyka Archibold	49.99
4 × 400 metres relay	Costa Rica; Tracy Joseph; Mariel Brokke; Angeline Pondler; Desire Bermúdez	3:46.68	Panama; Leyka Archibold; Suyeris Guerra; María Vargas; Katherine Torres	4:02.11	Nicaragua; Silvihna Avilés; Andrea Sosa; Irishell Villarreal; María Alejandra Carmona	4:27.84
20,000 metres track walk	Noelia Vargas; Costa Rica	1:37:13.93	María Fernanda Peinado; Guatemala	1:37:26.06	Yaquelin Teletor; Guatemala	1:49:29.25
High jump	Abigail Obando; Costa Rica	1.78 NR	Ana Isabela González; El Salvador	1.73	Maria José Rodriguez; Costa Rica	1.65
Pole vault	Andrea Velasco; El Salvador	3.80	Andrea Machuca; El Salvador	3.40	Vielka Arias; Costa Rica	3.30
Long jump	Thelma Fuentes; Guatemala	6.07w	Danisha Chimilio; Guatemala	5.67	Tiphanny Madrigal; Costa Rica	5.38
Triple jump	Thelma Fuentes; Guatemala	13.40w	Danisha Chimilio; Guatemala	12.43	Tiphanny Madrigal; Costa Rica	11.75w
Shot put	Deisheline Mayers; Costa Rica	13.00	Haydee Grijalba; Costa Rica	11.67	Aixa Middleton; Panama	11.61
Discus throw	Aixa Middleton; Panama	46.11	Estefani Sosa; Guatemala	41.79	Sofia Pérez; El Salvador	38.03
Hammer throw	Lindsay Reyes; Costa Rica	50.69	Daniela Cortes; Costa Rica	50.10	María José Soto; El Salvador	48.55
Javelin throw	Jennifer Rodríguez; Panama	45.36	Esther Padilla; Honduras	45.00	Deisheline Mayers; Costa Rica	41.90
Heptathlon	Mariel Brokke; Costa Rica	4846	Ana Gabriela Sánchez; Nicaragua	3271	Only two participants	

=== Mixed ===
Event	Gold		Silver		Bronze
4 × 400 metres relay	Costa Rica; Derick Leandro; Naydelin Calderón; Rasheed Sandoval; Desire Bermúdez	3:32.59	El Salvador; José René Navas; Idelma Delgado; George Erazo; Yency Chamur	3:48.54	Only two finishing teams

== Medal table ==
* Host nation (Costa Rica)

Rank	Nation	Gold	Silver	Bronze	Total
1	Costa Rica (CRC)*	16	16	11	43
2	Panama (PAN)	11	5	7	23
3	Guatemala (GUA)	9	10	8	27
4	El Salvador (ESA)	5	9	9	23
5	Nicaragua (NIC)	3	2	3	8
6	Honduras	2	3	2	7
7	Belize (BIZ)	0	1	2	3
Totals (7 entries)		46	46	42	134
