= 2018 Central American Championships in Athletics =

XXIX Central American Championships in Athletics
- Dates: 13–14 July
- Host city: Guatemala City, Guatemala
- Venue: Estadio Doroteo Guamuch Flores
- Level: Senior
- Events: 44
- Participation: 7 nations

The 29th Central American Championships in Athletics were held at the Estadio Doroteo Guamuch Flores in Guatemala City, Guatemala, on 13 and 14 July 2018.

A total of 44 events were contested, 22 by men, 22 by women.

== Medal summary ==
=== Men ===
Event	Gold		Silver		Bronze	
100 metres (wind: +0.4 m/s)	Héctor Allen; Costa Rica	10.53	José Andrés Salazar; El Salvador	10.63	Shaun Gill; Belize	10.80
200 metres (wind: -0.5 m/s)	Shermal Calimore; Costa Rica	21.22	José Humberto Bermúdez; Guatemala	21.22	José Andrés Salazar; El Salvador	21.47
400 metres	Nery Brenes; Costa Rica	46.26	José Humberto Bermúdez; Guatemala	47.21	Willy Castillo; Guatemala	49.18
800 metres	Fredd Ponce; Nicaragua	1:57.70	Georman Rivas; Costa Rica	1:57.80	Byron Herrera; Guatemala	1:57.82
1500 metres	Georman Rivas; Costa Rica	4:03.83	Mario Pacay; Guatemala	4:05.75	David Escobar; El Salvador	4:13.67
5000 metres	Mario Pacay; Guatemala	14:41.86	Daniel Johanning; Costa Rica	14:53.69	Williams Julajúj; Guatemala	15:08.19
10,000 metres	Daniel Johanning; Costa Rica	30:50.13	Álvaro Sanabria; Costa Rica	31:10.07	Alberto González; Guatemala	31:24.07
110 metres hurdles (wind: +0.9 m/s)	Wienstan Mena; Guatemala	14.72	Ronald Ramírez; Guatemala	14.83	Gabriel Mejía; Honduras	15.83
400 metres hurdles	Gerald Drummond; Costa Rica	49.85	Gerber Blanco; Guatemala	50.97	Pablo Andrés Ibáñez; El Salvador	51.25
3000 metres steeplechase	Brayan Tacan; Guatemala	9:45.13	David Escobar; El Salvador	9:57.02	Marcial Rodríguez; Nicaragua	10:05.16
4 × 100 metres relay	Costa Rica; Brayan Guzmán; Shermal Calimore; Jeikob Monge; Héctor Allen	40.83 CR	El Salvador	41.36	Guatemala	41.64
4 × 400 metres relay	Costa Rica; Brayan Guzmán; Jeikob Monge; Gerald Drummond; Shermal Calimore	3:12.23	Guatemala	3:15.52	Nicaragua	3:21.01
20,000 metres track walk	José Oswaldo Calel; Guatemala	1:28:11.36	Ángel Batz; Guatemala	1:28:22.61	Allan Segura; Costa Rica	1:46:43.28
High jump	Ken Fransua; Guatemala	2.12	Josué Athiang; Guatemala	1.85	Only two participants	
Pole vault	Natán Rivera; El Salvador	4.70	Pedro Figueroa; El Salvador	4.50	Abel Álvarez; Guatemala	3.70
Long jump	Juan Mosquera; Panama	7.73 CR	Becker Jarquín; Nicaragua	7.46	Nicolás Arriola; Guatemala	7.24
Triple jump	Fredy Lemus; Guatemala	15.77	Jason Castro; Honduras	15.46	Brandon Jones; Belize	15.04
Shot put	Anselmo Delgado; Panama	15.47	Billy López; Guatemala	14.76	Elías Gómez; Costa Rica	13.50
Discus throw	Winston Campbell; Honduras	45.96	Billy López; Guatemala	45.60	Juan Enrique Galdámez; El Salvador	44.00
Hammer throw	Roberto Sawyers; Costa Rica	70.70 CR	Diego Berríos; Guatemala	60.04	Enrique Martínez; El Salvador	57.94
Javelin throw	Luis Taracena; Guatemala	66.37	Jefferson Machorro; Guatemala	53.91	Juan Bladimir García; Nicaragua	52.50
Decathlon	Youssef Qasem; Guatemala	6129	Estebán Ibáñez; El Salvador	5814	Only two participants	

=== Women ===
Event	Gold		Silver		Bronze	
100 metres (wind: -0.9 m/s)	Tracy Joseph; Costa Rica	12.00	Rosa Baltazar; Guatemala	12.22	Hilary Gladden; Belize	12.25
200 metres (wind: -1.1 m/s)	Samantha Dirks; Belize	24.35	Rosa Baltazar; Guatemala	25.13	Kendi Rosales; Honduras	25.43
400 metres	Desiré Bermúduez; Costa Rica	55.08	Irma Harris; Costa Rica	55.41	Daniela Aragón; El Salvador	59.41
800 metres	Mónica Vargas; Costa Rica	2:13.54	Daniela Aragón; El Salvador	2:16.34	Josseline Beltrand; Guatemala	2:19.62
1500 metres	Mónica Vargas; Costa Rica	4:49.50	Viviana Aroche; Guatemala	4:49.88	Leydi Pocom; Guatemala	4:51.71
5000 metres	Cindy Monterroso; Guatemala	18:12.90	Ana María Cacao; Guatemala	19:21.46	Wendy Ascencio; El Salvador	19:31.84
10,000 metres	Cindy Monterroso; Guatemala	39:50.32	Xiomara Barrera; El Salvador	41:03.62	Wendy Ascencio; El Salvador	41:27.71
100 metres hurdles (wind: +1.2 m/s)	Andrea Vargas; Costa Rica	12.95 CR	Nancy Sandoval; El Salvador	14.12	Adriana Andrade; El Salvador	15.64
400 metres hurdles	Daniela Rojas; Costa Rica	58.69 CR	Sharolyn Scott; Costa Rica	62.10	Ariana Orozco; Nicaragua	66.46
3000 metres steeplechase	Máyela Menjívar; El Salvador	13:00.74	Ana Mirta Hércules; El Salvador	13:32.74	Susana Marroquín; Guatemala	14:00.64
4 × 100 metres relay	Costa Rica; Keylin Pennant; Andrea Vargas; Daneysha Robinson; Irma Harris	47.00	Guatemala	48.16	Belize	48.41
4 × 400 metres relay	Costa Rica; Sharolyn Scott; Daniela Rojas; Irma Harris; Desiré Bermúdez	3:46.69 CR	Guatemala	4:02.41	Belize	4:06.30
10,000 metres track walk	Maritza Poncio; Guatemala	50:11.20	Céfora Poncio; Guatemala	54:06.44	Melany Trejo; El Salvador	59:35.91
High jump	Kashany Ríos; Panama	1.70	Ana María Martínez; Panama	1.63	Julieta Cruz; Guatemala	1.55
Pole vault	Andrea Velasco; El Salvador	3.42 CR	Aime Zelaya; Honduras	2.70	Melissa Molina; Costa Rica	2.50
Long jump	Thelma Fuentes; Guatemala	6.36 CR	Estefany Cruz; Guatemala	6.06	Tricia Flores; Costa Rica	5.77
Triple jump	Thelma Fuentes; Guatemala	13.15 CR	Estefany Cruz; Guatemala	13.03	Ana María Martínez; Panama	12.22
Shot put	Dalila Rugama; Nicaragua	12.91	Aixa Middleton; Panama	12.16	Naomy Smith; Costa Rica	11.73
Discus throw	Aixa Middleton; Panama	52.41	Doroty López; Guatemala	40.18	Estefanie Sosa; Guatemala	38.75
Hammer throw	Sonja Moreno; Guatemala	51.91	Viviana Abarca; Costa Rica	47.62	Marcia Avalos; Guatemala	39.59
Javelin throw	Dalila Rugama; Nicaragua	47.93	Genova Arias; Costa Rica	45.51	Sofía Alonso; Guatemala	41.98
Heptathlon	Ana María Porras; Costa Rica	4954	Katy Sealy; Belize	4659	Ashontie Carr; Belize	3879

== Medal table ==
* Host nation (Guatemala)

Rank	Nation	Gold	Silver	Bronze	Total
1	Costa Rica (CRC)	18	7	5	30
2	Guatemala (GUA)*	14	22	14	50
3	Panama (PAN)	4	2	1	7
4	El Salvador (ESA)	3	9	10	22
5	Nicaragua (NIC)	3	1	4	8
6	Honduras	1	2	2	5
7	Belize	1	1	6	8
Totals (7 entries)		44	44	42	130
