= Athletics at the 2013 Central American Games – Results =

These are the full results of the athletics competition at the 2013 Central American Games which took place between March 9 and March 12, and on March 17, 2013 in San José, Costa Rica.

The following 6 events were cancelled in advance because the required minimum number of inscriptions (athletes representing at least 3 countries) could not be accomplished: men's pole vault, hammer throw, decathlon, 35 km road walk, and women's high jump and pole vault.

== Men's results ==
=== 100 meters ===
Heat 1 – 9 March – Wind: 0.4 m/s

| Rank | Name | Nationality | Time | Notes |
|---|---|---|---|---|
| 1 | Cruz Rolando Palacios | Honduras | 10.39 | Q |
| 2 | Mateo Edward | Panama | 10.47 | Q |
| 3 | Josef Norales | Honduras | 10.69 | Q |
| 4 | Jairo Guerra | Guatemala | 11.03 | q |
| 5 | José Benjamín Véliz | Nicaragua | 11.18 | |
| | Kemmer Watson | Costa Rica | DQ | Art 144 |

Heat 2 – 9 March – Wind: 1.3 m/s

| Rank | Name | Nationality | Time | Notes |
|---|---|---|---|---|
| 1 | Andrés Rodríguez | Panama | 10.66 | Q |
| 2 | Gary Robinson | Costa Rica | 10.97 | Q |
| 3 | Helson Pitillo | Honduras | 11.07 | Q |
| 4 | Jorge Luis Jiménez | Costa Rica | 11.12 | q |
| 5 | Daniel Alemán | Nicaragua | 11.42 | |
| 6 | Oliver Ñurinda | Nicaragua | 11.72 | |

Final – 9 March – Wind: -1.5 m/s

| Rank | Name | Nationality | Time | Notes |
|---|---|---|---|---|
| 1st place, gold medalist(s) | Cruz Rolando Palacios | Honduras | 10.48 | |
| 2nd place, silver medalist(s) | Mateo Edward | Panama | 10.58 | |
| 3rd place, bronze medalist(s) | Josef Norales | Honduras | 10.77 | |
| 4 | Andrés Rodríguez | Panama | 10.81 | |
| 5 | Gary Robinson | Costa Rica | 11.06 | |
| 6 | Jairo Guerra | Guatemala | 11.08 | |
| 7 | Jorge Luis Jiménez | Costa Rica | 11.15 | |
| | Helson Pitillo | Honduras | DQ | Art 162 |

=== 200 meters ===
Heat 1 – 10 March – Wind: 2.2 m/s

| Rank | Name | Nationality | Time | Notes |
|---|---|---|---|---|
| 1 | Cruz Rolando Palacios | Honduras | 21.33 w | Q |
| 2 | Arturo Deliser | Panama | 21.51 w | Q |
| 3 | Brandon Jones | Belize | 21.73 w | Q |
| 4 | Jorge Luis Jiménez | Costa Rica | 21.86 w | q |
| 5 | Daniel Alemán | Nicaragua | 22.64 w | |
| | Gary Robinson | Costa Rica | DNS | |

Heat 2 – 10 March – Wind: -0.4 m/s

| Rank | Name | Nationality | Time | Notes |
|---|---|---|---|---|
| 1 | Alonso Edward | Panama | 21.60 | Q |
| 2 | Gerald Drummond | Costa Rica | 21.71 | Q |
| 3 | Mateo Edward | Panama | 22.01 | Q |
| 4 | José Benjamín Véliz | Nicaragua | 22.19 | q |
| 5 | Jairo Guerra | Guatemala | 22.35 | |

Final – 10 March – Wind: 2.1 m/s

| Rank | Name | Nationality | Time | Notes |
|---|---|---|---|---|
| 1st place, gold medalist(s) | Alonso Edward | Panama | 20.52 w | |
| 2nd place, silver medalist(s) | Cruz Rolando Palacios | Honduras | 20.63 w | |
| 3rd place, bronze medalist(s) | Gerald Drummond | Costa Rica | 21.07 w | |
| 4 | Mateo Edward | Panama | 21.37 w | |
| 5 | Arturo Deliser | Panama | 21.41 w | |
| 6 | Brandon Jones | Belize | 21.62 w | |
| 7 | José Benjamín Véliz | Nicaragua | 22.08 w | |
| 8 | Jorge Luis Jiménez | Costa Rica | 22.25 w | |

=== 400 meters ===
Final – 11 March

| Rank | Name | Nationality | Time | Notes |
|---|---|---|---|---|
| 1st place, gold medalist(s) | Jarlex Lynch | Costa Rica | 47.16 | GR |
| 2nd place, silver medalist(s) | Kessel Campbell | Honduras | 48.11 | |
| 3rd place, bronze medalist(s) | Rolando Ayala | El Salvador | 48.52 | |
| 4 | Luis Murillo | Costa Rica | 48.83 | |
| 5 | Humberto Lugo | Nicaragua | 50.11 | |
| 6 | Chavis Lopez | Belize | 52.52 | |

=== 800 meters ===
Final – 9 March

| Rank | Name | Nationality | Time | Notes |
|---|---|---|---|---|
| 1st place, gold medalist(s) | Jenner Pelicó | Guatemala | 1:51.16 | ME |
| 2nd place, silver medalist(s) | Víctor Emilio Ortiz | Costa Rica | 1:51.21 | |
| 3rd place, bronze medalist(s) | Wilson Solano | Costa Rica | 1:53.89 | |
| 4 | David Hodgson | Costa Rica | 1:54.58 | |
| 5 | Luis Solórzano | El Salvador | 1:58.30 | |
| 6 | Irving Sánchez | Panama | 2:02.12 | |
| 7 | Humberto Lugo | Nicaragua | 2:02.84 | |
| 8 | Roberto Rocha | Nicaragua | 2:03.45 | |
| 9 | Chavis Lopez | Belize | 2:05.36 | |
| | Mario Guerrero | Nicaragua | DNF | |

=== 1500 meters ===
Final – 11 March

| Rank | Name | Nationality | Time | Notes |
|---|---|---|---|---|
| 1st place, gold medalist(s) | Víctor Manuel González | Guatemala | 3:58.00 | |
| 2nd place, silver medalist(s) | Georman Rivas | Costa Rica | 3:58.08 | |
| 3rd place, bronze medalist(s) | Jenner Pelicó | Guatemala | 3:58.16 | |
| 4 | Alejandro Calderón | Costa Rica | 4:00.52 | |
| 5 | Luis Solórzano | El Salvador | 4:01.71 | |
| 6 | Víctor Emilio Ortiz | Costa Rica | 4:05.47 | |
| 7 | Estuardo Palacios | Guatemala | 4:16.44 | |
| 8 | Irving Sánchez | Panama | 4:29.57 | |

=== 5000 meters ===
Final – 10 March

| Rank | Name | Nationality | Time | Notes |
|---|---|---|---|---|
| 1st place, gold medalist(s) | Víctor Manuel González | Guatemala | 14:49.30 | |
| 2nd place, silver medalist(s) | José Francisco Chaves | Costa Rica | 14:53.82 | |
| 3rd place, bronze medalist(s) | Alfredo Arévalo | Guatemala | 14:56.00 | |
| 4 | Dimas Castro | Nicaragua | 15:08.22 | |
| 5 | Georman Rivas | Costa Rica | 15:09.83 | |
| 6 | Estuardo Palacios | Guatemala | 15:18.61 | |
| 7 | Williams Sánchez | El Salvador | 15:27.20 | |
| 8 | Carlos René Aguilar | El Salvador | 15:40.84 | |
| 9 | Jorge Castel | Panama | 16:02.53 | |
| 10 | Jonathan Cerrud | Panama | 16:28.40 | |

=== 10,000 meters ===
Final – 12 March

| Rank | Name | Nationality | Time | Notes |
|---|---|---|---|---|
| 1st place, gold medalist(s) | Víctor Manuel González | Guatemala | 31:10.38 | |
| 2nd place, silver medalist(s) | José Francisco Chaves | Costa Rica | 31:12.65 | |
| 3rd place, bronze medalist(s) | Dimas Castro | Nicaragua | 31:14.70 | |
| 4 | Alfredo Arévalo | Guatemala | 31:30.28 | |
| 5 | César Lizano | Costa Rica | 32:03.57 | |
| 6 | Mynor López | Guatemala | 32:06.13 | |
| 7 | Williams Sánchez | El Salvador | 32:20.73 | |
| 8 | Carlos René Aguilar | El Salvador | 32:35.46 | |
| 9 | Cristián Villavicencio | Nicaragua | 33:03.72 | |
| 10 | Jorge Castelblanco | Panama | 33:06.32 | |

=== Marathon ===
Final – 17 March

| Rank | Name | Nationality | Time | Notes |
|---|---|---|---|---|
| 1st place, gold medalist(s) | José Amado García | Guatemala | 2:26:26 | |
| 2nd place, silver medalist(s) | Jeremias Saloj | Guatemala | 2:28:41 | |
| 3rd place, bronze medalist(s) | Dirian Bonilla | Nicaragua | 2:34:34 | |
| 4 | Juan Fallas | Costa Rica | 2:38:30 | |
| 5 | Adrián Canossa | Costa Rica | 2:40:23 | |
| 6 | Juan Carlos Reyes | Costa Rica | 2:53:37 | |
| 7 | Jeremy Vargas | Costa Rica | 3:03:47 | |
| | Cristián Villavicencio | Nicaragua | DNF | |
| | Deyner Sánchez | Costa Rica | DNF | |
| | Dimas Castro | Nicaragua | DNS | |

=== 110 meters hurdles ===
Final – 12 March – Wind: 2.0 m/s

| Rank | Name | Nationality | Time | Notes |
|---|---|---|---|---|
| 1st place, gold medalist(s) | Ronald Bennett | Honduras | 14.43 | |
| 2nd place, silver medalist(s) | Luis Carlos Bonilla | Guatemala | 14.85 | |
| 3rd place, bronze medalist(s) | Gerber Blanco | Guatemala | 15.17 | |
| 4 | Ronald Edyberto Ramírez | Guatemala | 15.40 | |

=== 400 meters hurdles ===
Final – 9 March

| Rank | Name | Nationality | Time | Notes |
|---|---|---|---|---|
| 1st place, gold medalist(s) | Kenneth Medwood | Belize | 51.14 | |
| 2nd place, silver medalist(s) | Gerald Drummond | Costa Rica | 51.44 | |
| 3rd place, bronze medalist(s) | Gerber Blanco | Guatemala | 53.22 | |
| 4 | Luis Carlos Bonilla | Guatemala | 56.59 | |
| | Omar Pomares | Nicaragua | DNS | |

=== 3000 meters steeplechase ===
Final – 12 March

| Rank | Name | Nationality | Time | Notes |
|---|---|---|---|---|
| 1st place, gold medalist(s) | Miguel Ángel Chan | Guatemala | 9:34.72 | |
| 2nd place, silver medalist(s) | Georman Rivas | Costa Rica | 9:35.25 | |
| 3rd place, bronze medalist(s) | Douglas Aguilar | El Salvador | 9:51.71 | |
| 4 | Carlos Antonio Pérez | El Salvador | 10:05.92 | |
| 5 | Jonathan Cerrud | Panama | 10:29.14 | |

=== High jump ===
Final – 10 March

| Rank | Name | Nationality | 1.70 | 1.75 | 1.80 | 1.85 | 1.90 | 1.93 | 1.96 | 1.99 | 2.02 | 2.05 | 2.08 | Result | Notes |
|---|---|---|---|---|---|---|---|---|---|---|---|---|---|---|---|
| 1st place, gold medalist(s) | Williams Ríos | Panama | - | - | - | - | O | - | O | O | O | XO | XXX | 2.05 | |
| 2nd place, silver medalist(s) | Henry Linton | Costa Rica | - | - | - | - | O | - | O | O | O | XXO | XXX | 2.05 | |
| 3rd place, bronze medalist(s) | Henry Edmon | Panama | - | - | - | - | - | - | O | O | O | XXX | | 2.02 | |
| 4 | Ronald Edyberto Ramírez | Guatemala | - | - | O | - | O | - | O | O | XXX | | | 1.99 | |

=== Long jump ===
Final – 11 March

| Rank | Name | Nationality | #1 | #2 | #3 | #4 | #5 | #6 | Result | Notes |
|---|---|---|---|---|---|---|---|---|---|---|
| 1st place, gold medalist(s) | Irving Saladino | Panama | 7.87 (0.8 m/s) | 7.70 (0.4 m/s) | 7.99 (-0.4 m/s) | X | 7.92 (-0.4 m/s) | - | 7.99 (-0.4 m/s) | |
| 2nd place, silver medalist(s) | Jhamal Bowen | Panama | 7.67 (-0.6 m/s) | X | X | 7.88 w (2.1 m/s) | X | X | 7.88 w (2.1 m/s) | |
| 3rd place, bronze medalist(s) | Juan Mosquera | Panama | 7.43 (-1.6 m/s) | 7.30 (-0.7 m/s) | 7.12 (-0.6 m/s) | 7.30 (0.5 m/s) | 7.45 (0.5 m/s) | 7.39 (1.6 m/s) | 7.45 (0.5 m/s) | |
| 4 | Jason Castro | Honduras | 7.33 (-0.9 m/s) | 7.38 (-0.8 m/s) | 7.38 (-0.6 m/s) | X | X | 7.35 (0.9 m/s) | 7.38 (-0.6 m/s) | |
| 5 | Brandon Jones | Belize | 6.37 (-1.0 m/s) | 6.99 (0.4 m/s) | 6.99 (-1.1 m/s) | X | - | X | 6.99 (-1.1 m/s) | |
| 6 | Kenneth Blackett | Belize | X | X | 6.77 (0.9 m/s) | X | - | X | 6.77 (0.9 m/s) | |
| 7 | Querson García | Guatemala | 6.62 (-0.7 m/s) | 6.52 (0.4 m/s) | 6.50 (-1.2 m/s) | 6.53 (0.4 m/s) | 6.45 (1.1 m/s) | 6.51 (-0.6 m/s) | 6.62 (-0.7 m/s) | |
| 8 | Ronald Edyberto Ramírez | Guatemala | 6.60 (1.0 m/s) | X | 6.29 (0.6 m/s) | 6.18 (0.9 m/s) | 6.39 (1.3 m/s) | X | 6.60 (1.0 m/s) | |
| | Seylik Gamboa | Guatemala | X | X | X | | | | NM | |

=== Triple jump ===
Final – 12 March

| Rank | Name | Nationality | #1 | #2 | #3 | #4 | #5 | #6 | Result | Notes |
|---|---|---|---|---|---|---|---|---|---|---|
| 1st place, gold medalist(s) | Jason Castro | Honduras | 15.39 (-1.0 m/s) | 15.01 (-2.5 m/s) | 15.12 (1.5 m/s) | 15.11 (-2.2 m/s) | 14.86 (-1.4 m/s) | 14.89 (-2.0 m/s) | 15.39 (-1.0 m/s) | |
| 2nd place, silver medalist(s) | Juan Mosquera | Panama | 14.07 (-0.9 m/s) | 14.92 (-0.4 m/s) | 14.27 (0.6 m/s) | 15.01 (-1.2 m/s) | 14.61 (-1.0 m/s) | 14.43 w (3.4 m/s) | 15.01 (-1.2 m/s) | |
| 3rd place, bronze medalist(s) | Brandon Jones | Belize | 14.77 (-1.3 m/s) | 14.87 (1.2 m/s) | X | X | 14.98 (0.4 m/s) | X | 14.98 (0.4 m/s) | |
| 4 | Seylik Gamboa | Guatemala | X | 14.17 (1.0 m/s) | 14.18 (1.3 m/s) | 13.76 (-1.7 m/s) | 13.91 (-2.3 m/s) | X | 14.18 (1.3 m/s) | |
| | Kenneth Blackett | Belize | | | | | | | DNS | |

=== Shot put ===
Final – 11 March

| Rank | Name | Nationality | #1 | #2 | #3 | #4 | #5 | #6 | Result | Notes |
|---|---|---|---|---|---|---|---|---|---|---|
| 1st place, gold medalist(s) | Luis Folgar | Guatemala | 14.52 | 15.13 | X | 15.15 | 15.62 | x | 15.62 | |
| 2nd place, silver medalist(s) | Roberto Sawyers | Costa Rica | 13.89 | 14.89 | X | 14.66 | 15.24 | x | 15.24 | |
| 3rd place, bronze medalist(s) | José Miguel Estrada | Guatemala | 13.69 | 14.17 | 14.24 | 14.17 | 14.02 | 13.81 | 14.24 | |
| 4 | Henry Santos | Guatemala | 12.86 | 13.27 | 12.92 | 12.91 | 12.95 | 13.65 | 13.65 | |
| 5 | Juan José Álvarez | Honduras | 13.31 | X | 13.07 | 13.18 | x | 12.81 | 13.31 | |
| 6 | Dennis Duran | El Salvador | X | X | 12.68 | 12.66 | x | 12.70 | 12.70 | |

=== Discus throw ===
Final – 10 March

| Rank | Name | Nationality | #1 | #2 | #3 | #4 | #5 | #6 | Result | Notes |
|---|---|---|---|---|---|---|---|---|---|---|
| 1st place, gold medalist(s) | Winston Campbell | Honduras | 49.33 | 51.64 | X | X | 51.55 | 50.81 | 51.64 | GR |
| 2nd place, silver medalist(s) | Roberto Sawyers | Costa Rica | X | X | 46.93 | X | X | 45.70 | 46.93 | |
| 3rd place, bronze medalist(s) | Ever Acajabón | Guatemala | 41.74 | 42.34 | 38.86 | 44.18 | 41.43 | 42.91 | 44.18 | |
| 4 | Darwin Vanegas | Nicaragua | X | 34.40 | X | X | 33.92 | X | 34.40 | |
| | Juan Enrique Galdámez | El Salvador | X | X | X | X | X | X | NM | |

=== Javelin throw ===
Final – 12 March

| Rank | Name | Nationality | #1 | #2 | #3 | #4 | #5 | #6 | Result | Notes |
|---|---|---|---|---|---|---|---|---|---|---|
| 1st place, gold medalist(s) | Luis Taracena | Guatemala | 60.35 | 61.77 | 61.46 | 63.58 | 61.26 | 64.31 | 64.31 | |
| 2nd place, silver medalist(s) | Erick Méndez | Costa Rica | 63.85 | 62.39 | 61.87 | 61.37 | 60.18 | 63.30 | 63.85 | |
| 3rd place, bronze medalist(s) | Rigoberto Calderón | Nicaragua | 58.57 | 57.86 | 60.20 | X | X | 57.88 | 60.20 | |
| 4 | Benigno Ortega | Panama | 53.48 | 55.73 | 58.96 | 57.54 | 58.17 | 55.35 | 58.96 | |
| 5 | Anastacio Buitrago | Panama | 48.27 | X | 50.65 | 55.06 | 55.61 | X | 55.61 | |

=== 20 kilometers walk ===
Final – 9 March

| Rank | Name | Nationality | Time | Notes |
|---|---|---|---|---|
| 1st place, gold medalist(s) | Allan Segura | Costa Rica | 1:28:43 | |
| 2nd place, silver medalist(s) | Mario Bran | Guatemala | 1:31:19 | |
| 3rd place, bronze medalist(s) | Gabriel Calvo | Costa Rica | 1:31:31 | |
| 4 | Yassir Cabrera | Panama | 1:34:06 | |
| 5 | Salvador Ernesto Mira | El Salvador | 1:35:33 | |
| 6 | Deiby Cordero | Costa Rica | 1:39:33 | |
| 7 | Ángel Batz | Guatemala | 1:39:45 | |
| 8 | Sergio Gutiérrez | Costa Rica | 1:45:29 | |
| | Bernardo Calvo | Costa Rica | DQ | Art 230.6 |

=== 4 x 100 meters relay ===
Final – 11 March

| Rank | Nation | Competitors | Time | Notes |
|---|---|---|---|---|
| 1st place, gold medalist(s) | Honduras | Kessel Campbell; Josef Norales; Ronald Bennett; Cruz Rolando Palacios | 41.61 | |
| 2nd place, silver medalist(s) | Costa Rica | Jaimar Hardy; Donald Arias; Denovan Hernández; Jorge Luis Jiménez | 41.72 | |
| 3rd place, bronze medalist(s) | Nicaragua | Oliver Ñurinda; Mario Guerrero; José Benjamín Véliz; Daniel Alemán | 42.88 | |
| 4 | Belize | Kenneth Medwood; Brandon Jones; Chavis López; Kenneth Blackett | 42.94 | |
| 5 | Guatemala | Luis Carlos Bonilla; Jairo Guerra; Gerber Blanco; Seylik Gamboa | 42.96 | |
| | Panama | Andrés Rodríguez; Alonso Edward; Mateo Edward; Arturo Deliser | DNF | |

=== 4 x 400 meters relay ===
Final – 12 March

| Rank | Nation | Competitors | Time | Notes |
|---|---|---|---|---|
| 1st place, gold medalist(s) | Costa Rica | Donald Arias; Luis Murillo; Gerald Drummond; Jarlex Lynch | 3:11.15 | GR |
| 2nd place, silver medalist(s) | Nicaragua | Humberto Lugo; Roberto Rocha; José Benjamín Véliz; Daniel Alemán | 3:22.10 | |
| 3rd place, bronze medalist(s) | Guatemala | Stiven Navarrete; Luis Carlos Bonilla; Querson García; Gerber Blanco | 3:29.86 | |
| | Belize | Kenneth Medwood; Chavis Lopez; Kenneth Blackett; Lirisi Cayetano | DNS | |

== Women's results ==
=== 100 meters ===
Final – 9 March – Wind: 2.1 m/s

| Rank | Name | Nationality | Time | Notes |
|---|---|---|---|---|
| 1st place, gold medalist(s) | Ruth-Cassandra Hunt | Panama | 11.88 w | |
| 2nd place, silver medalist(s) | Glenda Davis | Costa Rica | 12.19 w | |
| 3rd place, bronze medalist(s) | Sarita Morales | Costa Rica | 12.26 w | |
| 4 | Diana Garita | Costa Rica | 12.27 w | |
| 5 | Jeimmy Bernárdez | Honduras | 12.47 w | |

=== 200 meters ===
Final – 10 March – Wind: 1.2 m/s

| Rank | Name | Nationality | Time | Notes |
|---|---|---|---|---|
| 1st place, gold medalist(s) | Shantely Scott | Costa Rica | 23.84 | GR |
| 2nd place, silver medalist(s) | Ruth-Cassandra Hunt | Panama | 24.30 | |
| 3rd place, bronze medalist(s) | Glenda Davis | Costa Rica | 24.35 | |
| 4 | Sharolyn Joseph | Costa Rica | 24.51 | |

=== 400 meters ===
Final – 11 March

| Rank | Name | Nationality | Time | Notes |
|---|---|---|---|---|
| 1st place, gold medalist(s) | Dessire Bermúdez | Costa Rica | 54.90 | |
| 2nd place, silver medalist(s) | Shantely Scott | Costa Rica | 55.09 | |
| 3rd place, bronze medalist(s) | Sharolyn Scott | Costa Rica | 55.15 | |
| 4 | Andrea Ferris | Panama | 57.72 | |
| 5 | Cora Gutiérrez | Guatemala | 1:06.07 | |

=== 800 meters ===
Final – 9 March

| Rank | Name | Nationality | Time | Notes |
|---|---|---|---|---|
| 1st place, gold medalist(s) | Andrea Ferris | Panama | 2:06.39 | |
| 2nd place, silver medalist(s) | Gladys Landaverde | El Salvador | 2:08.29 | |
| 3rd place, bronze medalist(s) | María Fernanda Aguilar | Costa Rica | 2:18.65 | |
| 4 | Cora Gutiérrez | Guatemala | 2:31.56 | |
| | Susana Chan | Costa Rica | DQ | Art 163.b |

=== 1500 meters ===
Final – 11 March

| Rank | Name | Nationality | Time | Notes |
|---|---|---|---|---|
| 1st place, gold medalist(s) | Andrea Ferris | Panama | 4:31.62 | |
| 2nd place, silver medalist(s) | Gladys Landaverde | El Salvador | 4:34.18 | |
| 3rd place, bronze medalist(s) | Rolanda Bell | Panama | 4:41.67 | |
| 4 | Mónica Vargas | Costa Rica | 4:44.17 | |
| 5 | María Fernanda Aguilar | Costa Rica | 4:52.18 | |
| 6 | Meyling Hernández | Nicaragua | 5:21.94 | |
| 7 | Cora Gutiérrez | Guatemala | 5:25.37 | |

=== 5000 meters ===
Final – 9 March

| Rank | Name | Nationality | Time | Notes |
|---|---|---|---|---|
| 1st place, gold medalist(s) | Elida Hernández | Guatemala | 17:08.62 | GR |
| 2nd place, silver medalist(s) | Rolanda Bell | Panama | 17:08.64 | |
| 3rd place, bronze medalist(s) | Gabriela Traña | Costa Rica | 17:36.28 | |
| 4 | Xiomara Barrera | El Salvador | 18:09.91 | |
| 5 | Mónica Vargas | Costa Rica | 18:20.08 | |
| 6 | Evonne Marroquín | Guatemala | 18:31.91 | |
| 7 | Delbin Cartagena | El Salvador | 18:33.21 | |

=== 10,000 meters ===
Final – 11 March

| Rank | Name | Nationality | Time | Notes |
|---|---|---|---|---|
| 1st place, gold medalist(s) | Elida Hernández | Guatemala | 36:04.41 | GR |
| 2nd place, silver medalist(s) | Xiomara Barrera | El Salvador | 38:44.17 | |
| 3rd place, bronze medalist(s) | Delbin Cartagena | El Salvador | 38:48.77 | |
| 4 | Cristina Marín | Costa Rica | 39:34.30 | |
| 5 | Dina Cruz | Guatemala | 40:17.31 | |
| 6 | Alicia Zorrilla | Panama | 42:38.29 | |
| | Yelka Mairena | Nicaragua | DNS | |

=== Marathon ===
Final – 17 March

| Rank | Name | Nationality | Time | Notes |
|---|---|---|---|---|
| 1st place, gold medalist(s) | Gabriela Traña | Costa Rica | 2:54:59 | GR |
| 2nd place, silver medalist(s) | Dina Cruz | Guatemala | 3:03:51 | |
| 3rd place, bronze medalist(s) | Norma Rodríguez | Costa Rica | 3:07:03 | |
| 4 | Petra Mullers | Guatemala | 3:15:06 | |
| 5 | Mónica Jiménez | Costa Rica | 3:30:07 | |
| 6 | Ana Chávez | Costa Rica | 3:34:55 | |
| | Irene Sánchez | Costa Rica | DNF | |

=== 100 meters hurdles ===
Final – 12 March – Wind: 1.9 m/s

| Rank | Name | Nationality | Time | Notes |
|---|---|---|---|---|
| 1st place, gold medalist(s) | Jeimmy Bernárdez | Honduras | 14.42 | GR |
| 2nd place, silver medalist(s) | Ana María Porras | Costa Rica | 14.51 | |
| 3rd place, bronze medalist(s) | Naomi Priscilla Smith | Costa Rica | 15.39 | |

=== 400 meters hurdles ===
Final – 9 March

| Rank | Name | Nationality | Time | Notes |
|---|---|---|---|---|
| 1st place, gold medalist(s) | Sharolyn Scott | Costa Rica | 59.57 | |
| 2nd place, silver medalist(s) | Andrea Vargas | Costa Rica | 1:04.72 | |
| 3rd place, bronze medalist(s) | Gabriela Guevara | Panama | 1:06.42 | |

=== 3000 meters steeplechase ===
Final – 12 March

| Rank | Name | Nationality | Time | Notes |
|---|---|---|---|---|
| 1st place, gold medalist(s) | Rolanda Bell | Panama | 11:07.77 | |
| 2nd place, silver medalist(s) | Evonne Marroquín | Guatemala | 11:34.47 | |
| 3rd place, bronze medalist(s) | Candy Salazar | Costa Rica | 11:58.86 | |
| 4 | Meyling Hernández | Nicaragua | 12:33.88 | |

=== Long jump ===
Final – 11 March

| Rank | Name | Nationality | #1 | #2 | #3 | #4 | #5 | #6 | Result | Notes |
|---|---|---|---|---|---|---|---|---|---|---|
| 1st place, gold medalist(s) | Ana María Porras | Costa Rica | 5.56 (-2.3 m/s) | 5.61 (-2.1 m/s) | 5.53 (-1.9 m/s) | 5.61 (-2.7 m/s) | 5.67 (-2.4 m/s) | X | 5.67 (-2.4 m/s) | |
| 2nd place, silver medalist(s) | Nathalee Aranda | Panama | X | 5.58 (-1.3 m/s) | X | X | X | X | 5.58 (-1.3 m/s) | |
| 3rd place, bronze medalist(s) | Ana Lucía Camargo | Guatemala | X | X | 5.22 (-2.2 m/s) | 5.16 (-1.7 m/s) | 5.34 (-1.7 m/s) | 5.00 (-1.90 m/s) | 5.34 (-1.7 m/s) | |
| 4 | Lilian Koo | Panama | 5.23 (-0.4 m/s) | 5.12 (-2.1 m/s) | 4.94 (-1.7 m/s) | 5.31 (-1.8 m/s) | 5.21 (-2.4 m/s) | 5.20 (-2.3 m/s) | 5.31 (-1.8 m/s) | |
| 5 | Cristina Aldana | Guatemala | 5.20 (-0.7 m/s) | 5.18 (-0.6 m/s) | 5.02 (-1.2 m/s) | 5.29 (-1.1 m/s) | 5.05 (-1.4 m/s) | 5.04 (-1.7 m/s) | 5.29 (-1.1 m/s) | |
| 6 | Thelma Fuentes | Guatemala | 5.03 (-1.7 m/s) | 4.56 (-2.1 m/s) | 5.19 (-2.3 m/s) | X | X | 5.28 (-1.2 m/s) | 5.28 (-1.2 m/s) | |
| 7 | Jéssica Sánchez | Costa Rica | 5.18 (-1.1 m/s) | X | 4.85 (-1.4 m/s) | 4.82 (1.8 m/s) | 5.04 (-1.1 m/s) | 5.08 (-0.9 m/s) | 5.18 (-1.1 m/s) | |

=== Triple jump ===
Final – 12 March

| Rank | Name | Nationality | #1 | #2 | #3 | #4 | #5 | #6 | Result | Notes |
|---|---|---|---|---|---|---|---|---|---|---|
| 1st place, gold medalist(s) | Ana Lucía Camargo | Guatemala | X | 11.82 (-2.1 m/s) | X | X | 12.17 (-1.9 m/s) | 11.93 (-1.3 m/s) | 12.17 (-1.9 m/s) | |
| 2nd place, silver medalist(s) | Ana María Martínez | Panama | 11.58 (-2.4 m/s) | 11.42 (-2.3 m/s) | 11.93 (-1.6 m/s) | 11.77 (-1.9 m/s) | 11.78 (nwi) | X | 11.93 (-1.6 m/s) | |
| 3rd place, bronze medalist(s) | Thelma Fuentes | Guatemala | X | 11.53 (-2.3 m/s) | 11.38 (nwi) | X | X | - | 11.53 (-2.3 m/s) | |
| 4 | Lilian Koo | Panama | X | X | X | 11.36 (-2.1 m/s) | X | 11.40 (nwi) | 11.40 (NWI) | |
| 5 | Cristina Aldana | Guatemala | X | X | 11.30 (nwi) | X | 11.22 (-1.8 m/s) | 11.12 (nwi) | 11.30 (NWI) | |
| 6 | Jéssica Sánchez | Costa Rica | X | X | X | X | X | 11.19 (nwi m/s) | 11.19 (NWI) | |

=== Shot put ===
Final – 11 March

| Rank | Name | Nationality | #1 | #2 | #3 | #4 | #5 | #6 | Result | Notes |
|---|---|---|---|---|---|---|---|---|---|---|
| 1st place, gold medalist(s) | Natyan Catano | Panama | X | 12.25 | 12.58 | 12.20 | 12.36 | 12.04 | 12.58 | |
| 2nd place, silver medalist(s) | Aixa Middleton | Panama | 11.65 | 12.48 | 11.89 | 11.36 | X | 11.96 | 12.48 | |
| 3rd place, bronze medalist(s) | Sabrina Gaitán | Guatemala | 11.11 | 11.01 | 11.08 | 10.98 | X | 11.68 | 11.68 | |
| 4 | Gisela Henríquez | Panama | 10.91 | 11.39 | 11.42 | 11.62 | 11.63 | 11.00 | 11.63 | |
| 5 | Gloria Serano | Belize | 10.18 | 10.50 | 10.31 | 10.99 | X | 10.83 | 10.99 | |
| 6 | Emma Castillo | Guatemala | X | 10.46 | 10.56 | 10.62 | 10.09 | 10.26 | 10.62 | |
| 7 | Silvia Piñar | Costa Rica | 8.96 | 9.27 | 10.19 | 9.27 | 9.99 | 10.04 | 10.19 | |
| 8 | María Lourdes Ruíz | Nicaragua | 9.22 | X | X | 8.37 | - | - | 9.22 | |

=== Discus throw ===
Final – 10 March

| Rank | Name | Nationality | #1 | #2 | #3 | #4 | #5 | #6 | Result | Notes |
|---|---|---|---|---|---|---|---|---|---|---|
| 1st place, gold medalist(s) | Aixa Middleton | Panama | 48.43 | 44.31 | 49.08 | 47.84 | 45.13 | 46.58 | 49.08 | GR |
| 2nd place, silver medalist(s) | Sabrina Gaitán | Guatemala | 37.84 | 35.58 | 37.19 | 37.33 | 38.29 | 39.78 | 39.78 | |
| 3rd place, bronze medalist(s) | Silvia Piñar | Costa Rica | 37.39 | 36.51 | 34.08 | 35.66 | 37.39 | 35.94 | 37.39 | |
| 4 | Génova Arias | Costa Rica | X | 28.47 | 33.36 | 33.86 | X | 35.27 | 35.27 | |
| 5 | Jennifer Palma | Honduras | X | 30.96 | 34.81 | X | X | 35.02 | 35.02 | |
| 6 | Gloria Serano | Belize | 29.82 | 30.59 | 31.09 | 29.01 | 32.27 | X | 32.27 | |
| 7 | Ayleen González | Panama | 31.61 | X | 30.63 | 29.96 | 31.67 | X | 31.67 | |
| 8 | Emma Castillo | Guatemala | 29.52 | 31.53 | X | 30.62 | X | 29.43 | 31.53 | |
| 9 | Haydee Grijalba | Costa Rica | X | 30.23 | X | 30.23 | | | 30.23 | |
| | María Lourdes Ruíz | Nicaragua | X | X | X | | | | NM | |

=== Hammer throw ===
Final – 9 March

| Rank | Name | Nationality | #1 | #2 | #3 | #4 | #5 | #6 | Result | Notes |
|---|---|---|---|---|---|---|---|---|---|---|
| 1st place, gold medalist(s) | Sabrina Gaitán | Guatemala | 51.20 | 53.30 | X | 52.02 | X | 52.36 | 53.30 | |
| 2nd place, silver medalist(s) | Elena Lojo | Panama | 44.59 | 43.40 | 46.34 | 41.82 | 43.88 | 46.86 | 46.86 | |
| 3rd place, bronze medalist(s) | Viviana Abarca | Costa Rica | 43.90 | X | 44.59 | 44.34 | 46.26 | X | 46.26 | |
| 4 | Silvia Piñar | Costa Rica | 30.45 | 39.68 | X | X | X | X | 39.68 | |
| 5 | Dagmar Alvarado | Panama | 37.75 | X | X | X | 35.84 | X | 37.75 | |

=== Javelin throw ===
Final – 12 March

| Rank | Name | Nationality | #1 | #2 | #3 | #4 | #5 | #6 | Result | Notes |
|---|---|---|---|---|---|---|---|---|---|---|
| 1st place, gold medalist(s) | Dalila Rugama | Nicaragua | 48.40 | X | X | - | 43.49 | 43.21 | 48.40 | |
| 2nd place, silver medalist(s) | Génova Arias | Costa Rica | X | X | 43.07 | 45.47 | 43.47 | 45.89 | 45.89 | |
| 3rd place, bronze medalist(s) | Rocío Navarro | Panama | X | 42.97 | 39.07 | 43.73 | 42.87 | X | 43.73 | |
| 4 | Kimberly Baltazar | Guatemala | X | 33.37 | 38.71 | X | X | 33.48 | 38.71 | |
| 5 | Haydee Grijalba | Costa Rica | 34.47 | 38.54 | 37.29 | 36.06 | 37.17 | 37.69 | 38.54 | |
| 6 | Sofía Alonso | Guatemala | 34.10 | 35.35 | 34.91 | 30.62 | 32.75 | 33.79 | 35.35 | |
| 7 | Katy Sealy | Belize | 27.87 | X | - | - | - | - | 27.87 | |

=== Heptathlon ===
Final – 9/10 March

The highest mark recorded in each event is highlighted in yellow

| Rank | Name | Nationality | 100m H | HJ | SP | 200m | LJ | JT | 800m | Points | Notes |
|---|---|---|---|---|---|---|---|---|---|---|---|
| 1st place, gold medalist(s) | Ana María Porras | Costa Rica | 14.56 (0.5); 901 | 1.61 747 | 11.18 607 | 25.80 (2.6); 815 | 5.67 (-1.5); 750 | 19.30 276 | 2:30.27 689 | 4785 | |
| 2nd place, silver medalist(s) | Katy Sealy | Belize | 15.74 (0.5); 746 | 1.67 818 | 10.63 571 | 27.44 (2.6); 676 | 4.71 (-1.8); 482 | 34.27 558 | 2:42.31 547 | 4398 | |
| 3rd place, bronze medalist(s) | Ruth Morales | Guatemala | 16.07 (0.5); 706 | 1.64 783 | 7.04 338 | 26.56 (2.6); 749 | 4.97 (-2.1); 551 | 31.46 504 | 2:38.55 590 | 4221 | |
| 4 | María Inaly Morazán | Nicaragua | 16.19 (0.5); 691 | 1.58 712 | 7.84 389 | 26.84 (2.6); 725 | 4.85 (-0.5); 519 | 25.32 388 | 2:35.14 630 | 4054 | |
| 5 | Jéssica López | El Salvador | 17.00 (0.5); 596 | 1.49 610 | 8.54 434 | 28.71 (2.6); 576 | 4.47 (-2.2); 421 | 26.76 415 | 2:43.17 537 | 3589 | |

=== 20 kilometers walk ===
Final – 9 March

| Rank | Name | Nationality | Time | Notes |
|---|---|---|---|---|
| 1st place, gold medalist(s) | Cristina López | El Salvador | 1:48:12 | |
| 2nd place, silver medalist(s) | Sonia Barrondo | Guatemala | 1:51:43 | |
| 3rd place, bronze medalist(s) | Maritza Poncio | Guatemala | 1:53:50 | |
| 4 | Glenda Úbeda | Nicaragua | 2:00:37 | |

=== 4 x 100 meters relay ===
Final – 11 March

| Rank | Nation | Competitors | Time | Notes |
|---|---|---|---|---|
| 1st place, gold medalist(s) | Panama | Kashani Ríos; Nathalee Aranda; Gabriela Guevara; Ruth-Cassandra Hunt | 46.66 | (46.651) GR |
| 2nd place, silver medalist(s) | Costa Rica | Diana Garita; Glenda Davis; Sarita Morales; Shantely Scott | 46.66 | (46.657) GR |
| 3rd place, bronze medalist(s) | Guatemala | Stephanie Silva; Cristina Aldana; Thelma Fuentes; María José Rodas | 52.55 | |

=== 4 x 400 meters relay ===
Final – 12 March

| Rank | Nation | Competitors | Time | Notes |
|---|---|---|---|---|
| 1st place, gold medalist(s) | Costa Rica | Susana Chan; Sharolyn Scott; Shantely Scott; Dessire Bermúdez | 3:48.90 | GR |
| 2nd place, silver medalist(s) | Panama | Leyka Archibold; Gabriela Guevara; Nathalee Aranda; Andrea Ferris | 3:52.21 | |
| 3rd place, bronze medalist(s) | Guatemala | Cora Gutiérrez; María José Rodas; Ruth Morales; Evonne Marroquín | 4:23.69 | |
