= 2014 Central American Championships in Athletics =

XXV Central American Championships in Athletics
- Dates: June 20–22
- Host city: Tegucigalpa, Honduras
- Venue: Estadio Olímpico Palacio de los Deportes UNAH
- Level: Senior
- Events: 44 (22 men, 22 women)
- Participation: 170 athletes from 7 nations
- Records set: 6

The 25th Central American Championships in Athletics were held at the Estadio Olímpico Palacio de los Deportes UNAH in Tegucigalpa, Honduras, between June 20–22, 2014.

A total of 44 events were contested, 22 by men and 22 by women. In total, 6 championships records were set. Guatemala won the overall team trophy.

== Medal summary ==
Complete results were published.

=== Men ===
Event	Gold		Silver		Bronze	
100 metres (wind: +2.6 m/s)	Cruz Rolando Palacios; Honduras	10.27 w	Josef Norales; Honduras	10.39 w	Kemmer Watson; Costa Rica	10.64 w
200 metres (wind: +0.6 m/s)	Cruz Rolando Palacios; Honduras	20.81 CR	Brandon Jones; Belize	21.17	Josef Norales; Honduras	21.47
400 metres	Gerald Drummond; Costa Rica	47.20	Rober Trigueño; Guatemala	49.08	David Benjamen Hodgson; Costa Rica	49.38
800 metres	Víctor Emilio Ortiz; Costa Rica	1:53.57	David Benjamen Hodgson; Costa Rica	1:54.21	Joseph Acevedo; Panama	1:54.85
1500 metres	Luis Gustavo Solórzano; El Salvador	3:56.56	Erick Rodríguez; Nicaragua	3:56.77	Joseph Acevedo; Panama	3:57.53
5000 metres	Elvin Cu; Guatemala	15:10.49	Edwin Pirir; Guatemala	15:19.07	José Alfredo Asturias; Guatemala	15:24.05
10,000 metres^{*}	José Alfredo Asturias; Guatemala	32.30.87	Carlos Aguilar; El Salvador	33.17.22		
110 metres hurdles (wind: +0.0 m/s)	Ronald Bennett; Honduras	14.50	Gerber Blanco; Guatemala	14.76	Luis Carlos Bonilla; Guatemala	14.86
400 metres hurdles	Gerald Drummond; Costa Rica	50.78	Kenneth Medwood; Belize	51.16	Gerber Blanco; Guatemala	52.89
3000 metres steeplechase	Erick Rodríguez; Nicaragua	9:26.41	Miguel Ángel Chan; Guatemala	9:34.45	David Alexander Escobar; El Salvador	9:41.22
4 x 100 metres relay	Honduras; Cruz Rolando Palacios; Josef Norales; Bryan Ramírez; Ronald Bennett	41.50	Guatemala; Rober Trigueño; Douglas Orellana; Gerber Blanco; Seylik Gamboa	41.81	Belize; Mark Anderson; Brandon Jones; Kenneth Blackett; Jervis Myvette	42.96
4 x 400 metres relay	Costa Rica; Georman Rivas; David Benjamen Hodgson; Gerald Drummond; Emmanuel Niño	3:20.17	Nicaragua; Jeffri Arcia; Daniel Alemán; Ramón Rizo; Oneyker Aragón	3:23.75	Guatemala; Ronald Edyberto Ramírez; Jenner Pelicó; Gerber Blanco; Luis Carlos Bonilla	3:25.09
20,000 metres track walk	José María Raymundo; Guatemala	1:28:54.03	José Gregorio Ajcam; Guatemala	1:31:09.27	Gabriel Calvo; Costa Rica	1:31:45.80
High jump	Alexander Bowen; Panama	2.16 CR	Marlon Colorado; El Salvador	2.05	Ronald Edyberto Ramírez; Guatemala	2.02
Pole vault	Pedro Daniel Figueroa; El Salvador	4.70	Natan Armando Rivera; El Salvador	4.40	Alejandro Melara; El Salvador	4.00
Long jump	Jhamal Bowen; Panama	7.66 (wind: -1.0 m/s) CR	Brandon Jones; Belize	7.19 (wind: +1.2 m/s)	Seylik Gamboa; Guatemala	7.10 w (wind: +2.3 m/s)
Triple jump	Jason Castro; Honduras	15.65 (wind: +1.7 m/s)	Brandon Jones; Belize	15.39 (wind: +0.6 m/s)	Juan Mosquera; Panama	14.73 (wind: -3.0 m/s)
Shot put	Luis Folgar; Guatemala	14.23	Winston Campbell; Honduras	13.94	Óscar Márquez; El Salvador	12.87
Discus throw	Winston Campbell; Honduras	48.10	Mario McKenzie; Costa Rica	47.29	Ever Acajabón; Guatemala	40.40
Hammer throw	Diego Berríos; Guatemala	60.51	Edgar Rafael Florián; Guatemala	59.07	Alejandro Arroyo; Costa Rica	49.01
Javelin throw	Luis Taracena; Guatemala	61.52	Erick Méndez; Costa Rica	59.26	Rider Jiménez; Nicaragua	59.11
Decathlon	José Roberto Carballo; Costa Rica	5472	Mario Alejandro Mancia; El Salvador	5378	Jorge Luis Castillo; Panama	5336

^{*}: No points for team trophy.

=== Women ===
Event	Gold		Silver		Bronze	
100 metres (wind: -0.8 m/s)	Ruth-Cassandra Hunt; Panama	11.88	Tracy Joseph; Costa Rica	11.90	Shantely Scott; Costa Rica	11.91
200 metres (wind: +0.6 m/s)	Ruth-Cassandra Hunt; Panama	23.78 CR	Shantely Scott; Costa Rica	24.30	Kendy Rosales; Honduras	25.55
400 metres	Desiree Bermúdez; Costa Rica	55.34	Sofía Carias; El Salvador	59.29	Ajahney Carr; Belize	1:00.69
800 metres	Mónica Vargas; Costa Rica	2:15.45	Ana Mirta Hércules; El Salvador	2:18.53	Joselyn Jazmín Grijalva; El Salvador	2:22.64
1500 metres	Ana Mirta Hércules; El Salvador	4:41.25	Mónica Vargas; Costa Rica	4:46.12	María Teresa Ferris; Panama	4:50.16
5000 metres	Xiomara Barrera; El Salvador	18:28.45	Delbin Cartagena; El Salvador	18:38.37	Candy Salazar; Costa Rica	18:40.58
10,000 metres^{*}	Delbin Cartagena; El Salvador	38.31.78	Xiomara Barrera; El Salvador	38.37.97	Martha Edith Jiménez; El Salvador	39.18.62
100 metres hurdles (wind: +0.3 m/s)	Beatriz Flamenco; El Salvador	15.21	Alexia Neal; Belize	15.37	Iris Santamaría; El Salvador	16.55
400 metres hurdles	Sharolyn Scott; Costa Rica	1:01.10	Alexia Neal; Belize	1:05.29	Daniela Rojas; Costa Rica	1:06.65
3000 metres steeplechase	Aldy Gonzales; Honduras	11:28.96	Candy Salazar; Costa Rica	11:42.21	Alba de León; Guatemala	12:47.61
4 x 100 metres relay	Costa Rica; Daneysha Robinson; Melanie Foulkes; Shantely Scott; Desiree Bermúdez	49.08	El Salvador; Sofía Carias; María Renee Gómez; Iris Santamaría; Beatriz Flamenco	49.75	Guatemala; Stephanie Sofía Silva; Thelma Fuentes; Cristina Anelise Aldana; Ruth Morales	52.90
4 x 400 metres relay	Costa Rica; Shantely Scott; Mónica Vargas; Desiree Bermúdez; Sharolyn Scott	3:50.97	El Salvador; Beatriz Flamenco; Ana Mirta Hércules; Rosa Escobar; Sofía Carias	4:04.55		
10,000 metres track walk^{**}	Cristina Esmeralda López; El Salvador	49:18.36	Sonia Barrondo; Guatemala	49:25.43	Francisca Ferris; Panama	57:42.20
High jump	Kashani Ríos; Panama	1.81	Ruth Morales; Guatemala	1.65	Stephanie Sofía Silva; Guatemala; Abigail Obando; Costa Rica	1.60
Pole vault	Andrea Velasco; El Salvador	3.31 CR	Catherine Ramos; El Salvador	2.90	Fátima Aguirre; El Salvador	2.90
Long jump	Ana Camargo; Guatemala	5.58 (wind: -0.3 m/s)	Cristina Anelise Aldana; Guatemala	5.31 (wind: -0.3 m/s)	Melanie Foulkes; Costa Rica	5.25 (wind: -0.4 m/s)
Triple jump	Ana Camargo; Guatemala	12.77 (wind: +1.0 m/s)	Thelma Fuentes; Guatemala	12.32 w (wind: 2.3 m/s)	Cristina Anelise Aldana; Guatemala	11.76 (wind: +1.4 m/s)
Shot put	Emma Castillo; Guatemala	11.56	Sabrina Gaitán; Guatemala	11.25	Gloria Serano; Belize	11.24
Discus throw	Ayleen González; Panama	42.73	Haydee Grijalba; Costa Rica	40.84	Alma Gutiérrez; Honduras	36.75
Hammer throw	Sabrina Gaitán; Guatemala	56.78 CR	Viviana Abarca; Costa Rica	46.11	Dagmar Alvarado; Panama	42.85
Javelin throw	Genova Arias; Costa Rica	43.45	Sofía Isabel Alonso; Guatemala	38.44	Haydee Grijalba; Costa Rica	36.12
Heptathlon	Katy Sealy; Belize	4535	Ruth Morales; Guatemala	4218	María Inaly Morazán; Nicaragua	3929

^{*}: No points for team trophy.
^{**}: 16-year old Arely Esmeralda Morales from Guatemala was 3rd in 55:35.92 competing as guest.

== Medal table (unofficial) ==
* Host nation (Honduras)

Rank	Nation	Gold	Silver	Bronze	Total
1	Costa Rica (CRC)	11	9	10	30
2	Guatemala (GUA)	10	14	12	36
3	El Salvador (ESA)	8	11	7	26
4	Honduras (HON)*	7	2	3	12
5	Panama (PAN)	6	0	7	13
6	Belize (BIZ)	1	6	3	10
7	Nicaragua (NIC)	1	2	2	5
Totals (7 entries)		44	44	44	132

== Team trophies ==
Guatemala won the overall team trophy.

=== Total ===
The host country is highlighted in lavender blue

Rank	Nation	Points
1st place, gold medalist(s)	Guatemala	116.5
2nd place, silver medalist(s)	Costa Rica	109.5
3rd place, bronze medalist(s)	El Salvador	84
4	(Panama) Panamá	50
5	Honduras	49
6	Belize	29
7	Nicaragua	18

=== Male ===
The host country is highlighted in lavender blue

Rank	Nation	Points
1st place, gold medalist(s)	Guatemala	64
2nd place, silver medalist(s)	Costa Rica	47
3rd place, bronze medalist(s)	Honduras	39
4	El Salvador	29
5	(Panama) Panamá	23
6	Nicaragua	15
7	Belize	14

=== Female ===
The host country is highlighted in lavender blue

Rank	Nation	Points
1st place, gold medalist(s)	Costa Rica	62.5
2nd place, silver medalist(s)	El Salvador	55
3rd place, bronze medalist(s)	Guatemala	52.5
4	(Panama) Panamá	27
5	Belize	15
6	Honduras	10
7	Nicaragua	3

== Participation ==
According to an unofficial count, 170 athletes from 7 countries participated.

- Belize (10)
- Costa Rica (32)
- El Salvador (39)
- Guatemala (37)
- Honduras (24)
- Nicaragua (12)
- (Panama) Panamá (16)
