= Juan Mosquera (athlete) =

Panamanian long jumper

Juan Roso Mosquera Prado (born 29 January 1994) is a Panamanian long jumper and triple jumper.

He hails from Coclé. In age-specific competitions, he had success in regional Central American competitions. He finished fifth in the long jump, pool A (13th total) at the 2010 Youth Olympic Games, and at the 2011 World Youth Championships he finished sixth while not reaching the final of the triple jump competition. His three gold medals at the 2011 CODICADER Games were also noted by the Panamanian media, in addition to a championship record with a "15-metre jump" in the triple jump. His official personal bests as a U18 athlete were 7.34 metres and 14.59 metres respectively.

As a senior athlete, Mosquera went on to win the gold medal at the 2012 Central American Championships, where he also earned a silver medal in the 4 x 100 metres relay and a 5th place in the triple jump. At the 2013 Central American Championships he took a relay gold, a long jump silver and a triple jump bronze. At the 2013 Central American Games he took the triple jump silver, as well as a long jump bronze behind compatriots Irving Saladino and Jhamal Bowen. Another Central American Championships in 2014 brought him a triple jump bronze and a 5th place in the relay. His last age-specific medal was the bronze medal at the 2014 South American Under-23 Championships. His personal best marks as a U20 athlete were 7.45 and 15.01 metres respectively, both achieved in 2013.

Mosquera won the 2015 Central American Championships and finished 7th at the 2015 South American Championships, took two gold medals at the 2016 Central American Championships (long jump and relay). Placing lowly in the triple jump at the 2016 Central American Championships, he bounced back in 2017 to jump 15.44 metres with no wind information in Panama City, then finish 8th at the 2017 Central American Championships, 5th at the 2017 Central American Games and 8th at the 2017 Bolivarian Games – the latter in a lifetime best of 15.04 metres.

In the long jump, he won a bronze medal at the 2017 Central American Championships, the gold medal at the 2018 Central American Championships in a lifetime best of 7.73 metres, and finished 8th at the 2018 Central American and Caribbean Games. After several years away from competition he returned with an 8th place at the 2021 Central American Championships.
