= 2024 Central American Championships in Athletics =

XXXIV Central American Championships in Athletics
- Dates: 28–29 June
- Host city: San Salvador, El Salvador
- Venue: Estadio Jorge "El Mágico" González
- Level: Senior
- Events: 44
- Participation: 7 nations
- Records set: 7 CR

The 34th Central American Championships in Athletics were held at the Estadio Jorge "El Mágico" González in San Salvador, El Salvador, on 28 and 29 June 2024.

A total of 44 events were contested, 22 by men, 21 by women, as well as one mixed event.

== Medal summary ==
=== Men ===
Event	Gold		Silver		Bronze	
100 metres (wind: -1.5 m/s)	Arturo Deliser; Panama	10.48	Alejandro Ricketts; Costa Rica	10.72	Héctor Allen; Costa Rica	10.90
200 metres (wind: -1.5 m/s)	Arturo Deliser; Panama	21.14	Héctor Allen; Costa Rica	21.60	Yeykell Romero; Nicaragua	21.79
400 metres	Iñigo Pérez; Honduras	47.42	José Pablo Elizondo; Costa Rica	47.49	Sebastián Vidal; El Salvador	47.76
800 metres	Chamar Chambers; Panama	1:48.57	José Pablo Elizondo; Costa Rica	1:52.09	Aaron Hernández; El Salvador	1:52.40
1500 metres	Marcos Cruz; Guatemala	3:52.80	Aaron Hernández; El Salvador	3:54.06	Brandon Barrantes; Costa Rica	3:54.31
5000 metres	Mario Pacay; Guatemala	14:33.96	Daniel Johanning; Costa Rica	14:41.91	Franklin Álvarez; Guatemala	14:57.48
10,000 metres	Daniel Johanning; Costa Rica	29:59.52	Luis Pirir; Guatemala	30:21.18	Franklin Álvarez; Guatemala	30:40.21
110 metres hurdles (wind: +1.8 m/s)	Wienstan Mena; Guatemala	14.70	Gino Toscano; Panama	15.08	Gabriel Mejía; Honduras	15.18
400 metres hurdles	Emmanuel Niño; Costa Rica	50.95	Pablo Andrés Ibáñez; El Salvador	52.14	Samuel Ibáñez; El Salvador	52.46
3000 metres steeplechase	Diddier Rodríguez; Panama	8:49.13 CR	Marcos Cruz; Guatemala	9:01.36	Paulo Gómez; Costa Rica	9:09.33
4 × 100 metres relay	Costa Rica; Dominik Darbey; Shamayl Kooper; Alejandro Ricketts; Héctor Allen	41.62	El Salvador; Samuel Ibáñez; Sebastián Vidal; Paolo Cordon; Marlon Colorado	42.83	Honduras; Ramiro Álvarez; Iñigo Pérez; Andres Calix; Melique García	43.19
4 × 400 metres relay	El Salvador; Samuel Ibáñez; Joseph Hernández; Paolo Cordon; Sebastián Vidal	3:17.36	Nicaragua; Fredd Ponce; Jaser Matute; Yeykell Romero; Kelvin Ramírez	3:11.02	Only two starting teams	
20,000 metres track walk	Erick Barrondo; Guatemala	1:24:49.40 CR	Bernardo Barrondo; Guatemala	1:24:49.41	Yassir Cabrera; Panama	1:27:59.80
High jump	Jaime Escobar; Panama	2.05	Marlon Colorado; El Salvador	1.90	Fredy Lemus; Guatemala	1.90
Pole vault	Diego Navas; El Salvador	3.50	Only one starter			
Long jump	Rasheed Miller; Costa Rica	7.53	Nicolás Arriola; Guatemala	7.25	Gabriel Mejía; Honduras	6.85
Triple jump	Fredy Lemus; Guatemala	15.06	Jason Castro; Honduras	14.82	Fernando Reyes; El Salvador	14.26
Shot put	Zack Short; Honduras	18.04	Carlos Avilés; El Salvador	17.57	Anselmo Delgado; Panama	14.54
Discus throw	Winston Campbell; Honduras	49.56	Carlos Avilés; El Salvador	48.44	Zack Short; Honduras	46.85
Hammer throw	Carlos Arteaga; Nicaragua	58.92	David Ayala; El Salvador	56.85	Only two starters	
Javelin throw	Iván Sibaja; Costa Rica	70.28	Only one starter			
Decathlon	Estebán Ibáñez; El Salvador	7491 CR	Guillermo Rivas; Guatemala	6847	Miguel Suazo; Honduras	4996

=== Women ===
Event	Gold		Silver		Bronze	
100 metres (wind: -1.4 m/s)	Mariandre Chacón; Guatemala	11.88	Mariel Brokke; Costa Rica	12.24	María Alejandra Carmona; Nicaragua	12.27
200 metres (wind: -1.6 m/s)	Cristal Cuervo; Panama	23.72	Mariandre Chacón; Guatemala	23.95	María Alejandra Carmona; Nicaragua	24.72
400 metres	Cristal Cuervo; Panama	53.64	Desire Bermúdez; Costa Rica	55.16	Kali Magana; Belize	55.97
800 metres	Angeline Pondler; Costa Rica	2:11.65	Antonella Lanuza; Costa Rica	2:11.83	Sofía Urizar; Guatemala	2:14.24
1500 metres	Antonella Lanuza; Costa Rica	4:34.60	Sofía Urizar; Guatemala	4:34.96	Débora Quel; Guatemala	4:39.40
5000 metres	Viviana Aroche; Guatemala	16:48.07 CR	Priscila Solís; Costa Rica	17:52.10	Idelma Delgado; El Salvador	19:10.78
10,000 metres	Priscila Solis; Costa Rica	36:51.58	Sandra Raxón; Guatemala	38:18.28	Idelma Delgado; El Salvador	40:38.42
100 metres hurdles (wind: +1.9 m/s)	Andrea Vargas; Costa Rica	12.82 CR	Mariel Brokke; Costa Rica	13.75	Nathalie Almendárez; El Salvador	13.91
400 metres hurdles	Daniela Rojas; Costa Rica	57.74 CR	Lydia Troupe; Belize	60.08	Mariangel Núñez; Costa Rica	62.08
4 × 100 metres relay	Costa Rica; Daneysha Robinson; Dessiré Bermúdez; Andrea Vargas; Mariel Villalobos	48.64	El Salvador; Rebeca Barrientos; Shantelly Scott; Fernanda Rodríguez; Nathalie Almendárez	49.71	Nicaragua; Grethel Flores; María Alejandra Alvarado; Angely Zacarias; María Alejandra Carmona	50.83
4 × 400 metres relay	Nicaragua; Angely Zacarias; Esmeralda Ríos; María Alejandra Alvarado; María Alejandra Carmona	4:00.14	El Salvador; Ely Vargas; Yency Chamur; Rebeca Barrientos; Ana González	4:14.56	Only two starting teams	
20,000 metres track walk	Noelia Vargas; Costa Rica	1:33:35.3 CR	Mirna Ortiz; Guatemala	1:36:50.3	María Fernanda Peinado; Guatemala	1:37:55.2
High jump	Abigail Obando; Costa Rica	1.70	Maria José Rodriguez; Costa Rica	1.65	Ana González; El Salvador	1.65
Pole vault	Andrea Velasco; El Salvador	3.80	Vielka Arias; Costa Rica	3.40	Andrea Machuca; El Salvador	3.00
Long jump	Brooklyn Lyttle; Belize	5.99	Danisha Chimilio; Guatemala	5.70	Rebeca Barrientos; El Salvador	5.52
Triple jump	Thelma Fuentes; Guatemala	12.96	Danisha Chimilio; Guatemala	12.88	Rebeca Barrientos; El Salvador	11.93
Shot put	Alejandra Rosales; El Salvador	12.97	Aixa Middleton; Panama	11.59	Rebeca Garay; El Salvador	11.35
Discus throw	Aixa Middleton; Panama	45.34	Estefani Sosa; Guatemala	43.38	Alejandra Rosales; El Salvador	41.77
Hammer throw	Sophie Pérez; Guatemala	55.70	Lindsay Reyes; Costa Rica	50.40	María José Soto; El Salvador	46.05
Javelin throw	Esther Padilla; Honduras	42.42	Esperanza Sibaja; Nicaragua	40.29	Rosalba Martínez; Nicaragua	39.89
Heptathlon	Ana González; El Salvador	4628	Stephanie Hernández; Honduras	3162	Only two participants	

=== Mixed ===
Event	Gold		Silver		Bronze	
4 × 400 metres relay	Costa Rica; Derick Leandro; Melanie Vargas; José Pablo Elizondo; Mariel Brokke	3:32.24	Nicaragua; Fredd Ponce; María Alejandra Alvarado; Yeykell Romero; Maria Alejandra Carmona	3:32.64	El Salvador; Paolo Cordon; Ely Vargas; Juan Moncayo; Yency Chamur	3:41.91

== Medal table ==
* Host nation (El Salvador)

Rank	Nation	Gold	Silver	Bronze	Total
1	Costa Rica (CRC)	15	12	5	32
2	Guatemala (GUA)	9	12	6	27
3	Panama (PAN)	8	2	2	12
4	El Salvador (ESA)*	6	10	15	31
5	Honduras	4	2	5	11
6	Nicaragua (NCA)	2	3	5	10
7	Belize (BIZ)	1	2	0	3
Totals (7 entries)		45	43	38	126
