= Mariandrée Chacón =

Guatemalan sprinter (born 2004)

Personal information
- Born: November 6, 2004 (age 21)
- Home town: Huité, Zacapa Department, Guatemala
- Education: Colegio San Francisco Javier De Zacapa; Jacksonville University

Sport
- Country: Guatemala
- Sport: Sport of athletics
- Events: 100 metres 200 metres
- College team: Jacksonville Dolphins

Achievements and titles
- National finals: 2019 Guatemalan Champs; • 100m, 1st (gold); • 200m, 1st (gold); 2021 Costa Rican Champs; • 100m, 7th; • 200m, 1st (gold); 2021 Guatemalan Champs; • 200m, 1st (gold); 2022 Guatemalan Champs; • 100m, 1st (gold); • 400m, 1st (gold); • 200m, 1st (gold)
- Personal bests: 100m: 11.66 (−0.2) (2022); 200m: 23.85 (−1.6) (2023)
Medal record
Women's athletics
Representing Guatemala
NACAC U18 Championships
Bronze medal – third place	2021 San José	100 m
Silver medal – second place	2021 San José	200 m
- Updated on July 2024

Mariandrée Chacón (born 6 November 2004), also spelled Mariandre Chacón, is a Guatemalan sprinter specializing in the 100 metres and 200 metres. She is a multiple-time Central American Championships in Athletics winner and she was chosen to represent Guatemala in the 100 metres at the 2024 Summer Olympics.

== Career ==
At the 2020 Central American Championships in Athletics, Chacón earned her first international medals by winning the 100 m and finishing runner-up in the 200 m. She repeated that performance in both events at the 2021 Central American Championships in Athletics. The following month at the 2021 NACAC under-18 championships, Chacón placed 3rd in the 100 m and 2nd in the 200 m. She finished her 2021 championship season at the U20 Pan American Games, where she qualified for the 100 m and 200 m finals placing 8th and 6th respectively. At the 2022 Central American Championships in Athletics, Chacón earned gold medals in the 100 m and 200 m as well as a bronze in the 4 × 100 m anchoring the Guatemalan team.

Competing in her first global championship at the 2021 World Athletics U20 Championships, Chacón qualified for the semifinals in the 100 m and 200 m but did not advance to the finals in either event. She returned to contest both events again the following year, failing to advance past the first round in the 100 m but moving forward as the last semifinal qualifier in the 200 m before finishing last in her semifinal.

Chacón competed in the 2023 Central American and Caribbean Games, but she was disqualified for a false start in the 100 m and finished next to last in the 200 m. She improved her placings later that month at the 2023 NACAC U23 Championships, qualifying for both the 100 m and 200 m finals and placing 7th and 8th respectively. At the 2024 Central American Championships in Athletics, she was able to repeat her 100 m victory from 2022 but got silver in the 200 m behind Cristal Cuervo.

In July 2024, Chacón was selected to represent Guatemala in the 100 metres at the 2024 Summer Olympics. She was selected via a "universality place" that allows countries that would otherwise not have qualified to send one athlete in the 100 metres. She became the first female athletics Olympian from Guatemala in 52 years, and is the only female Guatemalan athletics competitor at the 2024 Summer Olympics.

== Personal life ==
Chacón is from Huité, Zacapa Department, Guatemala where she attended Colegio San Francisco Javier De Zacapa. She then majored in exercise science at Jacksonville University.

== Statistics ==
=== Personal best progression ===
100m progression
#	Mark	Pl.	Competition	Venue	Date	Ref.
1	12.27 (+0.6 m/s)	1st place, gold medalist(s)	Campeonato Centroamericano U18 y U20	San Salvador, El Salvador	16 May 2019	
2	12.16A (±0.0 m/s)	1st place, gold medalist(s)	Guatemalan Athletics Championships	Ciudad de Guatemala, Guatemala	7 Jun 2019	
3	12.10A	1st place, gold medalist(s)		Ciudad de Guatemala, Guatemala	6 Mar 2020	
4	11.97A (+1.7 m/s)	1st place, gold medalist(s)	Torneo Nacional	Ciudad de Guatemala, Guatemala	19 May 2021	
5	11.79A (+1.3 m/s)	7th	Costa Rican Athletics Championships	San José, Costa Rica	28 May 2021	
6	11.72 (±0.0 m/s)	(bronze) (Heat 1-22)	Pan American U23 Games	Cali, Colombia	29 Nov 2021	
7	11.66 (−0.2 m/s)	1st place, gold medalist(s)	Central American U20 Championships	Managua, Nicaragua	16 Jun 2022	

200m progression
#	Mark	Pl.	Competition	Venue	Date	Ref.
1	25.03A (+0.1 m/s)	1st place, gold medalist(s)	Guatemalan Athletics Championships	Ciudad de Guatemala, Guatemala	7 Jun 2019	
2	24.84A (−0.6 m/s)	(gold) (Round B)	XXXI Central American Senior Championships	San José, Costa Rica	27 Dec 2020	
3	24.72A (−0.1 m/s)	1st place, gold medalist(s)		Ciudad de Guatemala, Guatemala	12 Mar 2021	
4	24.56A (+1.1 m/s)	1st place, gold medalist(s)	Torneo Nacional	Ciudad de Guatemala, Guatemala	20 May 2021	
5	24.47A (+1.0 m/s)	2nd place, silver medalist(s)	Central American Championships	San José, Costa Rica	25 Jun 2021	
6	24.06A (−0.1 m/s)	2nd place, silver medalist(s)	NACAC U23	San José, Costa Rica	10 Jul 2021	
7	23.98 (±0.0 m/s)	6th	Pan American U23 Games	Cali, Colombia	2 Dec 2021	
8	23.97 (+0.6 m/s)	1st place, gold medalist(s)	Central American Championships	Managua, Nicaragua	1 Jul 2022	
9	23.91 (−0.3 m/s)	(bronze) (Heat 2-19)	World Athletics U20 Championships	Cali, Colombia	3 Aug 2022	
10	23.72 (+1.9 m/s)	(gold) (Round C)	UNF East Coast Relays	Jacksonville, FL	27 Apr 2023	
