= Erick Rodríguez (runner) =

Nicaraguan middle-distance runner (born 1990)

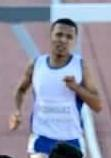

Personal information
- Born: 1 June 1990 (age 36) Jinotega, Nicaragua

Sport
- Sport: Track and field
- Events: 1500 m, 3000 m steeplechase
- Updated on 29 August 2015

Erick Rodríguez (born 1 June 1990) is a Nicaraguan middle-distance runner competing in the 1500 metres and 3000 metres steeplechase. He represented his country at the 2015 World Championships and 2016 World Indoor Championships without advancing from the first round.

He competed for Nicaragua at the 2016 Summer Olympics in the men's 1500 m event. He finished 15th in his heat and did not qualify for the semifinals. He was the flag bearer for Nicaragua during the closing ceremony.

He is the national record holder in the 1500 metres both outdoors and indoors.

== Competition record ==
Year	Competition	Venue	Position	Event	Notes
Representing Nicaragua
2008	Central American Junior and Youth Championships	San Salvador, El Salvador	1st	1500 m	4:05.26
2008	Central American Junior and Youth Championships	San Salvador, El Salvador	1st	3000 m s'chase	9:39.75
2009	Central American Junior and Youth Championships	San Salvador, El Salvador	1st	1500 m	3:57.99
2009	Central American Junior and Youth Championships	San Salvador, El Salvador	1st	3000 m s'chase	9:23.14
2009	Central American Championships	Guatemala City, Guatemala	1st	1500 m	3:58.92
2009	Central American Championships	Guatemala City, Guatemala	1st	3000 m s'chase	9:35.44
2009	Central American and Caribbean Championships	Havana, Cuba	6th	1500 m	4:00.59
2009	Central American and Caribbean Championships	Havana, Cuba	5th	3000 m s'chase	9:28.33
2010	Central American Championships	Guatemala City, Guatemala	2nd	1500 m	4:04.71
2010	Central American Championships	Guatemala City, Guatemala	1st	3000 m s'chase	9:55.86
2011	Central American Championships	San José, Costa Rica	2nd	1500 m	3:57.86
2011	Central American Championships	San José, Costa Rica	1st	3000 m s'chase	9:23.15
2013	Central American Championships	Managua, Nicaragua	2nd	1500 m	3:59.75
2013	Central American Championships	Managua, Nicaragua	1st	3000 m s'chase	9:37.51
2014	Central American Championships	Tegucigalpa, Honduras	2nd	1500 m	3:56.77
2014	Central American Championships	Tegucigalpa, Honduras	1st	3000 m s'chase	9:26.41
2014	Pan American Sports Festival	Mexico City, Mexico	11th	1500 m	4:09.85
2014	Pan American Sports Festival	Mexico City, Mexico	7th	3000 m s'chase	10:41.74
2014	Central American and Caribbean Games	Xalapa, Mexico	7th	1500 m	3:53.27
2014	Central American and Caribbean Games	Xalapa, Mexico	7th	3000 m s'chase	9:14.94
2015	Central American Championships	Managua, Nicaragua	2nd	1500 m	3:54.23
2015	Central American Championships	Managua, Nicaragua	1st	3000 m s'chase	9:10.29
2015	Pan American Games	Toronto, Canada	11th	3000 m s'chase	9:25.90
2015	World Championships	Beijing, China	39th (h)	1500 m	3:49.64
2016	World Indoor Championships	Portland, United States	14th (h)	1500 m	3:58.37
2016	Central American Championships in Athletics	San Salvador, El Salvador	1st	3000 m s'chase	9:14.27
2016	Central American Championships in Athletics	San Salvador, El Salvador	2nd	1500 m	3:54.12
2016	Olympic Games	Rio de Janeiro, Brazil	37th (h)	1500 m	4:00.30
2017	World Championships	London, United Kingdom	39th (h)	1500 m	3:52.35
2017	Athletics at the 2017 Central American Games	Managua, Nicaragua	3rd	1500 m	3:54.08
2017	Athletics at the 2017 Central American Games	Managua, Nicaragua	1st	3000 m s'chase	9:26.69

== Personal bests ==
Outdoor

- 1500 metres – 3:49.64 (Beijing 2015)
- 5000 metres – 15:33.51 (San José 2011)
- 3000 metres steeplechase – 9:10.29 (Managua 2015)

Indoor

- 1500 metres – 3:58.37 (Portland 2016)
