= Jhamal Bowen =

Panamanian long jumper (born 1991)

Jhamal Bowen (born 8 January 1991) is a Panamanian long jumper.

He was born in Colón. Like Irving Saladino, he was coached by Florencio Aguilar. As a junior he among others finished ninth at the 2008 World Junior Championships, won gold medals at the 2009 South American Youth Championships and the 2009 Pan American Junior Championships and finished fifth at the 2010 World Junior Championships. Around that time he also competed on the European meet circuit.

He finished ninth at the 2008 Ibero-American Championships, won the silver medal at the 2010 Central American Games (and a gold medal in the relay), won the gold medal at the 2011 Central American Championships (and a silver in the relay), finished fifth at the 2012 Ibero-American Championships, won the silver medal at the 2013 Central American Games, finished sixth at the 2013 South American Championships, fifth at the 2014 Ibero-American Championships, won the gold medal at the 2014 Central American Championships, finished fifth at the 2014 Central American and Caribbean Games, seventh at the 2015 Central American Championships, won the bronze medal at the 2017 Central American Games, the gold medal at the 2017 Central American Championships, and finished ninth at the 2018 Central American and Caribbean Games.

His personal best jump is 7.97 metres, achieved in May 2008 in Barquisimeto. At the time it was a tie of Thiago Dias' South American youth record.
