= Rolanda Bell =

Panamanian steeplechase runner

Personal information
- Born: 27 October 1987 (age 38) Queens, New York, United States
- Education: University of Tennessee
- Height: 5 ft 5 in (165 cm)

Sport
- Country: Panama
- Sport: Track and field
- Event: 3000 m steeplechase
- Updated on 29 August 2015

Rolanda Chanel Bell (born 27 October 1987) is a female steeplechase runner from Panama.

Rolanda Bell coaches athletes privately and trains with the NorCal Distance Project under Drew Wartenburg, alongside Olympian Kim Conley.

She was born in Queens, New York to a Panamanian father and an American mother.

== Competition record ==
Year	Competition	Venue	Position	Event	Notes
Representing Panama
2010	Central American Games	Panama City, Panama	2nd	800 m	2:10.12
2010	Central American Games	Panama City, Panama	2nd	1500 m	4:26.29
2010	Central American Games	Panama City, Panama	1st	4 × 400 m relay	3:50.53
2013	Central American Games	San José, Costa Rica	3rd	1500 m	4:41.67
2013	Central American Games	San José, Costa Rica	2nd	5000 m	17:08.64
2013	Central American Games	San José, Costa Rica	1st	3000 m s'chase	11:07.77
2013	South American Championships	Cartagena, Colombia	2nd	3000 m s'chase	10:04.01
2013	Bolivarian Games	Trujillo, Peru	6th	3000 m s'chase	10:11.17
2014	Ibero-American Championships	São Paulo, Brazil	7th	3000 m s'chase	10:24.74
2014	Central American and Caribbean Games	Xalapa, Mexico	6th	5000 m	17:29.20
2015	Pan American Games	Toronto, Canada	–	3000 m s'chase	DNF
2015	World Championships	Beijing, China	42nd (h)	3000 m s'chase	10:33.78
2017	Bolivarian Games	Santa Marta, Colombia	2nd	3000 m s'chase	10:08.56
2018	Central American and Caribbean Games	Barranquilla, Colombia	6th	5000 m	16:56.41
2018	Central American and Caribbean Games	Barranquilla, Colombia	4th	3000 m s'chase	10:30.47
2019	South American Championships	Lima, Peru	7th	3000 m s'chase	10:17.19
2019	Pan American Games	Lima, Peru	10th	3000 m s'chase	10:34.76
2021	South American Championships	Guayaquil, Ecuador	8th	3000 m s'chase	10:22.33
2023	South American Championships	São Paulo, Brazil	9th	3000 m s'chase	11:18.74

== Personal bests ==
Outdoor

- 800 metres – 2:08.63 (Holmdel 2011)
- 1500 metres – 4:22.58 (Kingston 2011)
- 3000 metres steeplechase – 9:47.16 (New York City 2015)

Indoor

- 3000 metres – 9:18.37 (Boston 2016)
