= Rasheed Miller =

Costa Rican long jumper (born 2000)

Rasheed Shamir Miller Güity (born 24 December 2000) is a Costa Rican long jumper.

In age-specific competitions he finished tenth at the 2019 Pan American U20 Championships and seventh at the 2021 Junior Pan American Games, both in the long jump. At the 2021 NACAC U23 Championships he won the bronze medal in the long jump and a silver medal in the relay.

In the long jump he won the bronze medal at the 2019 Central American Championships, the gold medals at the 2020, 2021 Central American Championships, the bronze medal at the 2022 Central American Championships, the gold medals at the 2023, 2024 and 2025 Central American Championships.

He also competed briefly in the high jump, winning the bronze medal at the 2019 Central American Championships, and took the triple jump bronze medal at the 2020 Central American Championships. In the 4 × 100 metres relay he won silver medals at the 2020 and 2022 Central American Championships followed by a gold medal at the 2025 Central American Championships.

At the 2021 Central American Championships, Miller set a new Costa Rican record of 7.58 metres, subsequently improved to 7.59 in June 2022 in Gandía. His 8.07 metre jump at the 2023 Central American Championships on home soil in San José was wind-assisted and thus not legal, as was his 7.84 at the 2024 Costa Rican championships.

At the 2025 Central American Championships he made a large improvement of the national record to 7.89 metres. This also broke the championship record which had stood at 7.73.
