= 2021 Central American Championships in Athletics =

XXXII Central American Championships in Athletics
- Dates: June 26–27
- Host city: San José, Costa Rica
- Venue: Estadio Nacional
- Level: Senior
- Events: 43
- Participation: 169 athletes from 10 (7+3) nations
- Records set: 9

The 32nd Central American Championships in Athletics were held at the Estadio Nacional in San José, Costa Rica, between June 26–27, 2021.

A total of 44 events were contested (one as exhibition), 22 by men and 22 by women. In total, 9 championships records were set. Costa Rica won the overall team trophy.

== Medal summary ==
Complete results were published.

=== Men ===
Event	Gold		Silver		Bronze	
100 metres (wind: -0.3 m/s)	Arturo Deliser; Panama	10.42	Yeykell Romero; Nicaragua	10.50	Shermal Calimore; Costa Rica	10.54
200 metres (wind: +1.0 m/s)	Shermal Calimore; Costa Rica	20.89	Nery Brenes; Costa Rica	20.91	Jeikob Monge; Costa Rica	21.49
400 metres	Nery Brenes; Costa Rica	46.78	Antonio Grant; Panama	48.12	José Pablo Elizondo; Costa Rica	48.30
800 metres	Juan Diego Castro Villalobos; Costa Rica	1:49.87 CR	Chamar Chambers; Panama	1:50.17	George Erazo; El Salvador	1:51.81
1500 metres	Juan Diego Castro Villalobos; Costa Rica	3:58.08	Aaron Alexander Hernández; El Salvador	3:59.80	Diddier Rodríguez; Panama	4:00.53
5000 metres	Mario Pacay; Guatemala	14:26.48	Alberto Gonzalez Mindez; Guatemala	14:28.41	Daniel Johanning; Costa Rica	14:34.22
10,000 metres	Alberto Gonzalez Mindez; Guatemala	29:52.13	Daniel Johanning; Costa Rica	29:56.38	Oscar Antonio Aldana; El Salvador	31:25.63
110 metres hurdles (wind: -1.2 m/s)	Wienstan Mena; Guatemala	14.22	Emmanuel Niño; Costa Rica	14.62	Victor Steiner; Puerto Rico	14.97
400 metres hurdles	Gerald Drummond; Costa Rica	49.31 CR	Emmanuel Niño; Costa Rica	50.17	Luis Alonso Guevara; Costa Rica	54.95
3000 metres steeplechase	César Peraza; El Salvador	9:12.38	Carlos Alcides Santos; El Salvador	9:14.01	Julio César Avilés; Costa Rica	9:16.88
4 x 100 metres relay	Costa Rica; Luis Guevara; Shermal Calimore; Jeikob Monge; Emmanuel Niño	41.29	El Salvador; Juan Rodríguez; Victor Steiner; Fernando Bonilla; Piero Braghieri	42.23	Honduras; Gerom Solis; Melique García; Miguel Negrete; Kenneth Glenn	42.29
4 x 400 metres relay	Costa Rica; Jose Elizondo; Jeikob Monge; Emmanuel Niño; Gerald Drummond	3:19.86	El Salvador; Ronal Moreno; Piero Braghieri; Samuel Ibáñez; George Erazo	3:20.69	Belize; Jihad Ahmad; Hance Card; Gary Neal; Rahim Monsanto	3:32.16
10,000 metres track walk	Bryan Matías; Guatemala	43:55.30	Juan Manuel Calderón; Costa Rica	44:23.03	Gabriel Alvarado; Nicaragua	44:52.05
High jump	Víctor Saavedra; Panama	1.93	Byron Villalobos; Costa Rica	1.85	Elias Ocampo; Costa Rica	1.80
Pole vault	Christiaan Higueros; Guatemala	4.60	Julio Flores; Nicaragua	4.55	Daniel Machado; El Salvador	4.50
Long jump	Rasheed Miller; Costa Rica	7.58	Kenneth Glenn; Honduras	7.50	Adrian Alvarado; Panama	7.42
Triple jump	Fredy Lemus; Guatemala	15.54	Brandon Jones; Belize	14.89	Elias Ocampo; Suriname	14.17
Shot put	Zack Short; Honduras	19.66 CR	Anselmo Delgado; Panama	14.54	Cojac Smith; Belize	13.69
Discus throw	Zack Short; Honduras	49.03	Elías José Gómez; Costa Rica	45.98	Alberto Peralta; Panama	39.50
Hammer throw	Roberto Sawyers; Costa Rica	71.72 CR	Dylan Suárez; Costa Rica	59.40	Carlos Arteaga Carrión; Nicaragua	56.08
Javelin throw	Jonathan Cedeño; Panama	68.07	Armando Caballero; Panama	62.40	Rowe Miranda; Panama	60.51
Decathlon	Esteban Ibañez; El Salvador	6482	Miguel Negrete; Honduras	5616	Edgar Nieto; Panama	4880

=== Women ===
Event	Gold		Silver		Bronze	
100 metres (wind: +1.1 m/s)	Mariandreé Chacón; Guatemala	11.94	Ivanniz Blackwood; Costa Rica	12.18	Irma Harris; Costa Rica	12.21
200 metres (wind: +1.0 m/s)	Samantha Dirks; Belize	23.80	Mariandreé Chacón; Guatemala	24.47	Ivanniz Blackwood; Costa Rica	24.85
400 metres	Tracy Joseph; Costa Rica	54.54	Desire Bermúdez; Costa Rica	55.32	Samantha Dirks; Belize	55.52
800 metres	Desire Bermúdez; Costa Rica	2:17.65	Lissette Ramírez; Costa Rica	2:19.88	Mónica Viviana Vargas; Costa Rica	2:24.24
1500 metres	Priscila María Solis; Costa Rica	4:54.57	Jimena Ortiz; Costa Rica	5:01.20	Mónica Viviana Vargas; Costa Rica	5:05.00
5000 metres	Viviana Aroche; Guatemala	17:23.11 CR	Priscila María Solis; Costa Rica	17:48.12	Idelma Delgado; El Salvador	17:54.66
10,000 metres	Diana Bogantes; Costa Rica	34:35.74 CR	Viviana Aroche; Guatemala	36:47.79	Idelma Delgado; El Salvador	37:18.81
100 metres hurdles (wind: -1.9 m/s)	Andrea Vargas; Costa Rica	13.10	Reimy Irvin; Panama	15.54	Luisana Alonso; Costa Rica	15.74
400 metres hurdles	Daniela Rojas Gutiérrez; Costa Rica	59.82	Leyka Archibold; Panama	1:04.54	Ariana Rivera; Nicaragua	1:05.81
3000 metres steeplechase^{†}	Chrisdyala Moraga; Costa Rica	12:35.08	Not awarded			
4 x 100 metres relay	Costa Rica; Luisana Alonso; Shantely Scott; Irma Harris; Ivanniz Blackwood	49.92	Not awarded			
4 x 400 metres relay	Costa Rica; Ivanniz Blackwood; Desire Bermúdez; Lissette Ramírez; Tracy Joseph	4:06.10	Not awarded			
10,000 metres track walk	María Fernanda Peinado; Guatemala	47:01.20 CR	Sharon Herrera; Costa Rica	47:35.52	Mariana Muñoz; Costa Rica	50:54.32
High jump	Abigail Obando; Costa Rica	1.77	Ana Isabela González; El Salvador	1.74	Maria José Rodriguez; Costa Rica	1.71
Pole vault	Andrea Michelle Velasco Barrera; El Salvador	3.86 CR	Fatima Yanira Soto; El Salvador	3.20	Vielka Arias; Costa Rica	2.80
Long jump	Nathalee Aranda; Panama	6.18	Thelma Fuentes; Guatemala	5.29	Tricia Flores; Belize	5.23
Triple jump	Thelma Fuentes; Guatemala	12.96	Amanda Muñoz; Costa Rica	11.93	Rebeca Barrientos; El Salvador	11.82
Shot put	Deisheline Mayers; Costa Rica	13.84	Karina Espinoza; Guatemala	12.33	Dalila Rugama; Nicaragua	12.30
Discus throw	Aixa Middleton; Panama	47.91	Haydee Grijalba; Costa Rica	44.33	Sofia Dinora Pérez; El Salvador	35.46
Hammer throw	Gabrielle Figueroa; Honduras	58.54 CR	Daniela Francini Cortes; Costa Rica	50.06	Lindsay Reyes; Costa Rica	45.97
Javelin throw	Dalila Rugama; Nicaragua	47.26	Deisheline Mayers; Costa Rica	42.85	Génova Arias; Costa Rica	39.97
Heptathlon	Mariel Brokke; Costa Rica	4096	María Castejón; Honduras	3304	Did not awarded	

^{†} Exhibition

== Medal table (unofficial) ==
* Host nation (Costa Rica)

Rank	Nation	Gold	Silver	Bronze	Total
1	Costa Rica (CRC)*	20	18	18	56
2	Guatemala (GUA)	10	5	0	15
3	Panama (PAN)	5	6	5	16
4	El Salvador (ESA)	3	6	8	17
5	Honduras	3	3	1	7
6	Nicaragua (NIC)	1	2	4	7
7	Belize (BIZ)	1	1	4	6
Totals (7 entries)		43	41	40	124

== Participation ==
According to an unofficial count, 162 (+ 7 guest) athletes from 7 (+ 3 guest) countries participated.

- Belize (16)
- Costa Rica (62)
- El Salvador (24)
- Guatemala (13)
- Honduras (8)
- Nicaragua (10)
- Panama (29)

Guest country:

- Ecuador (1)
- Puerto Rico (5)
- Suriname (1)
