= Samantha Dirks =

Belizean sprinter (born 1992)

Personal information
- Nationality: Belizean
- Born: 18 December 1992 (age 33) Los Angeles, United States
- Height: 5 ft 8 in (173 cm)

Sport
- Sport: Sprinting
- Event: 400 metres
- University team: Cal State Northridge Matadors

Samantha Nicole Dirks (born 18 December 1992) is a Belizean sprinter. She represented Belize at the 2020 Summer Olympics in the 400 metres and was a flag bearer in the opening ceremony. She holds the national record in the 400 metres.

== Career ==
Dirks began track during her senior year at Granada Hills High School, after previously playing basketball. She competed at the collegiate level for California State University, Northridge and finished fourth in the 400 metres at the 2016 MPSF Championship. She was raised in the San Fernando Valley in the United States, but she represents Belize, her parents' homeland, in international competition. She won a gold medal with the 4 × 100 metres relay at the 2016 Central American Championships.

Dirks competed in the 400 metres at the 2017 World Championships, finishing 49th in the heats. She won gold medals in both the 200 metres and the 400 metres at the 2017 Central American Championships in Athletics. She was selected to represent Belize at the 2018 Commonwealth Games in 400 metres but did not start in her heat. She won the 200 metres at both the 2018 and 2019 Central American Championships.

Dirks won another gold medal in the 200 metres at the 2021 Central American Championships. She was awarded a universality place for the 2020 Summer Olympics, as no athlete from Belize met the Olympic Qualifying Standards. Although the Belize Athletic Association recommended her for a place in the 200 metres, she was awarded a spot in the 400 metres, where she placed 7th in her heat and did not advance to the semifinals. Her time, 54.16 seconds, was a season best for her, but she said afterward that she had been hoping for a better time. She was one of two flag bearers for Belize in the opening ceremony.

As of 2023, Dirks is a part of the 2028 Summer Olympics athlete fellowship program, working in partnership sales.

Olympic Games
Preceded by Brandon Jones	Flag bearer for Belize; Tokyo 2020 with Shaun Gill	Succeeded by Shaun Gill
