= Winston Campbell =

Personal information
- Full name: Winston Joel Campbell Campbell
- Born: 18 August 1991 (age 35) Roatán, Honduras
- Education: Universidad Pedagógica

Sport
- Sport: Athletics
- Events: Discus throw, shot put
- Coached by: Porfirio Chacón

Winston Joel Campbell (born 18 August 1991 in Roatán) is a Honduran athlete specislising in the discus throw. He has won numerous medals for his country at regional level.

His personal best in the event is 53.19 metres set in Tegucigalpa in 2026.

== International competitions ==
Year	Competition	Venue	Position	Event	Notes
Representing Honduras
2009	Central American Junior and Youth Championships	San Salvador, El Salvador	1st	Discus throw (1.75 kg)	43.81 m
2009	Central American Championships	Guatemala City, Guatemala	3rd	Discus throw	44.49 m
2010	Central American Games	Panama City, Panama	1st	Discus throw	45.23 m
2010	Central American Junior and Youth Championships	Panama City, Panama	1st	Discus throw (1.75 kg)	48.80 m
2010	Central American Championships	Guatemala City, Guatemala	2nd	Discus throw	43.85 m
2011	Central American Championships	San José, Costa Rica	2nd	Discus throw	47.47 m
2011	Central American and Caribbean Championships	Mayagüez, Puerto Rico	7th	Discus throw	46.96 m
2012	Ibero-American Championships	Barquisimeto, Venezuela	10th	Discus throw	48.40 m
2012	Central American Championships	Managua, Nicaragua	1st	Discus throw	50.51 m
2012	NACAC U23 Championships	Irapuato, Mexico	–	Discus throw	NM
2013	Central American Games	San José, Costa Rica	1st	Discus throw	51.64 m
2013	Universiade	Kazan, Russia	18th (q)	Discus throw	47.04 m
2014	Central American Championships	Tegucigalpa, Honduras	2nd	Shot put	13.94 m
2014	Central American Championships	Tegucigalpa, Honduras	1st	Discus throw	48.10 m
2015	Central American Championships	Managua, Nicaragua	4th	Shot put	13.96 m
2015	Central American Championships	Managua, Nicaragua	1st	Discus throw	50.18 m
2015	NACAC Championships	San José, Costa Rica	10th	Discus throw	47.39 m
2016	Ibero-American Championships	Rio de Janeiro, Brazil	4th	Discus throw	49.29 m
2016	Central American Championships	San Salvador, El Salvador	4th	Shot put	13.16 m
2016	Central American Championships	San Salvador, El Salvador	1st	Discus throw	49.03 m
2017	Central American Championships	Tegucigalpa, Honduras	2nd	Shot put	13.48 m
2017	Central American Championships	Tegucigalpa, Honduras	1st	Discus throw	49.35 m
2017	Central American Games	Managua, Nicaragua	5th	Shot put	14.05 m
2017	Central American Games	Managua, Nicaragua	1st	Discus throw	50.82 m
2018	Central American Championships	Guatemala City, Guatemala	1st	Discus throw	45.96 m
2018	Central American and Caribbean Games	Barranquilla, Colombia	7th	Discus throw	49.11 m
2019	Central American Championships	Managua, Nicaragua	3rd	Shot put	13.52 m
2019	Central American Championships	Managua, Nicaragua	1st	Discus throw	47.23 m
2023	Central American Championships	San José, Costa Rica	1st	Discus throw	51.77
2024	Central American Championships	San Salvador, El Salvador	5th	Shot put	12.75 m
2024	Central American Championships	San Salvador, El Salvador	1st	Discus throw	49.56 m
2024	Ibero-American Championships	Cuiabá, Brazil	11th	Discus throw	51.53 m
2025	Central American Championships	Managua, Nicaragua	1st	Shot put	14.69 m
2025	Central American Championships	Managua, Nicaragua	2nd	Discus throw	49.50 m
2025	Central American Games	Quetzaltenango, Guatemala	4th	Shot put	14.78 m
2025	Central American Games	Quetzaltenango, Guatemala	1st	Discus throw	53.17 m
2026	Ibero-American Championships	Lima, Peru	8th	Discus throw	52.47 m
2026	Central American Championships	Managua, Nicaragua	2nd	Shot put	14.33 m
2026	Central American Championships	Managua, Nicaragua	1st	Discus throw	52.02 m
2026	Pan American Championships	Medellín, Colombia	7th	Discus throw	52.47 m

== Personal bests ==
- Shot put – 14.69 (Managua 2025)
- Discus throw – 53.17 (Tegucigalpa 2026)
