= Yesenia Miranda =

Salvadoran racewalker (born 1994)

Yesenia Ivania Miranda Rivas (born March 26, 1994) is a Salvadoran racewalker. She competed at the 2016 Summer Olympics in the women's 20 kilometres walk but she ended up being one of the five racewalkers who did not finish the race.
