= Kendi Rosales =

Honduran sprinter

Personal information
- Nationality: Honduran
- Born: 3 April 1990 (age 35)

Sport
- Sport: Athletics
- Event: Sprinting

Kendi Marisela Rosales Madrid (born 3 April 1990) is a Honduran athlete. She competed in the women's 60 metres at the 2018 IAAF World Indoor Championships.
