= Ana María Porras =

Costa Rican female heptathlete

Ana María Porras (born 21 September 1991) is a Costa Rican track and field athlete who competes in the heptathlon and hurdling events. She is the Costa Rican record holder in the long jump (5.95 m) and the heptathlon (4954 points).

She has been highly successful at regional level, winning seven gold medals at the Central American Championships in Athletics across various events from 2007 to 2015. She won medals in three events at the 2013 Central American Games, including two golds. She is the heptathlon meet record holder at both the Central American Games and Championships. In her younger years she also won numerous medals at the Central American Junior and Youth Championships in Athletics, taking five titles in both 2008 and 2009.

Beyond regional level, she has represented her country at the Pan American Combined Events Cup, the NACAC Championships in Athletics and the Universiade.

She was ruled out of the 2014 season due to having to undergo surgery on her ankle ligaments.

== Personal bests ==
- 200 metres – 25.96 (2012)
- 800 metres – 2:24.39 min (2018)
- 100 metres hurdles – 14.25 (2013)
- High jump – 1.70 m (2017)
- Long jump – 5.95 m (2013)
- Shot put – 11.38 m (2014)
- Javelin throw – 32.03 m (2018)
- Heptathlon – 4954 pts (2018)

All information from IAAF

== International competitions ==
Year	Competition	Venue	Position	Event	Notes
2006	Central American Youth Championships	Guatemala City, Guatemala	1st	300 m hurdles	46.36
2006	Central American Youth Championships	Guatemala City, Guatemala	1st	Pentathlon	2674 pts
2007	Central American Youth Championships	San Salvador, El Salvador	1st	100 m hurdles	15.37
2007	Central American Youth Championships	San Salvador, El Salvador	1st	400 m hurdles	65.75
2007	Central American Youth Championships	San Salvador, El Salvador	2nd	High jump	1.56 m
2007	Central American Youth Championships	San Salvador, El Salvador	1st	4 × 100 m relay	49.69 CR
2007	Central American Youth Championships	San Salvador, El Salvador	1st	Medley relay	2:17.47 CR
2007	Central American Championships	San José, Costa Rica	3rd	400 m hurdles	66.18
2007	Central American Championships	San José, Costa Rica	2nd	High jump	1.56 m
2007	NACAC Championships	San Salvador, El Salvador	7th	400 m hurdles	65.58
2007	NACAC Championships	San Salvador, El Salvador	—	High jump	NM
2008	Central American Youth Championships	San Salvador, El Salvador	1st	100 m hurdles	14.57
2008	Central American Youth Championships	San Salvador, El Salvador	1st	400 m hurdles	64.74 CR
2008	Central American Youth Championships	San Salvador, El Salvador	1st	Long jump	5.35 m
2008	Central American Youth Championships	San Salvador, El Salvador	1st	4 × 100 m relay	49.53
2008	Central American Youth Championships	San Salvador, El Salvador	1st	Medley relay	2:19.17
2008	Central American Championships	San Pedro Sula, Honduras	1st	400 m hurdles	65.54
2008	Central American Championships	San Pedro Sula, Honduras	3rd	Long jump	5.02 m
2009	Central American Junior Championships	San Salvador, El Salvador	1st	100 m hurdles	14.98 CR
2009	Central American Junior Championships	San Salvador, El Salvador	1st	400 m hurdles	65.37
2009	Central American Junior Championships	San Salvador, El Salvador	1st	Long jump	5.72 m
2009	Central American Junior Championships	San Salvador, El Salvador	1st	4 × 100 m relay	49.45
2009	Central American Junior Championships	San Salvador, El Salvador	1st	4 × 400 m relay	3:57.68
2009	Central American Championships	Guatemala City, Guatemala	2nd	100 m hurdles	14.92
2009	Central American Championships	Guatemala City, Guatemala	1st	400 m hurdles	63.61
2009	Central American Championships	Guatemala City, Guatemala	1st	Long jump	5.54 m
2010	Central American Junior Championships	Panama City, Panama	1st	100 m hurdles	15.58
2010	Central American Junior Championships	Panama City, Panama	1st	400 m hurdles	64.57
2010	Central American Junior Championships	Panama City, Panama	1st	4 × 100 m relay	49.72
2010	Central American Junior Championships	Panama City, Panama	1st	4 × 400 m relay	4:00.20
2010	Central American Games	Panama City, Panama	2nd	100 m hurdles	15.90
2010	Central American Games	Panama City, Panama	4th	400 m hurdles	1:05.38
2011	NACAC Combined Events Championships	Mona, Jamaica	12th	Heptathlon	4602 pts
2011	Central American Championships	San José, Costa Rica	1st	Heptathlon	4585 pts CR
2011	CAC Championships	Mayagüez, Puerto Rico	8th	Heptathlon	4655 pts
2012	NACAC U23 Championships	Irapuato, Mexico	6th	Heptathlon	4784 pts
2012	Pan American Combined Events Cup	Ottawa, Canada	12th	Heptathlon	4729 pts
2012	Central American Championships	Managua, Nicaragua	1st	Heptathlon	4715 pts CR
2013	Central American Championships	Managua, Nicaragua	1st	100 m hurdles	14.50
2013	Central American Championships	Managua, Nicaragua	2nd	High jump	1.60 m
2013	Central American Championships	Managua, Nicaragua	1st	Long jump	5.86 m
2013	Central American Games	San José, Costa Rica	2nd	100 m hurdles	14.51
2013	Central American Games	San José, Costa Rica	1st	Long jump	5.67 m
2013	Central American Games	San José, Costa Rica	1st	Heptathlon	4785 pts
2013	Pan American Combined Events Cup	Ottawa, Canada	13th	Heptathlon	4751 pts
2013	Universiade	Kazan, Russia	14th	Heptathlon	4743 pts
2015	Central American Championships	Managua, Nicaragua	1st	400 m hurdles	1:02.03
2015	Central American Championships	Managua, Nicaragua	3rd	4 × 100 m relay	49.13
2015	Central American Championships	Managua, Nicaragua	1st	4 × 400 m relay	3:52.77
2018	Central American and Caribbean Games	Barranquilla, Colombia	6th	Heptathlon	4852 pts
