= Mark Anderson (sprinter) =

Belizean sprinter

Personal information
- Born: 16 November 1991 (age 34)

Sport
- Country: Belize
- Sport: Track and field
- Event: sprinter
- Updated on 29 August 2015

Mark Anderson (born 16 November 1991) is a male Belizean sprinter. He competed in the Men's 100 metres event at the 2015 World Championships in Athletics in Beijing, China.

== See also ==
- Belize at the 2015 World Championships in Athletics
