= Noelia Vargas =

Costa Rican racewalker

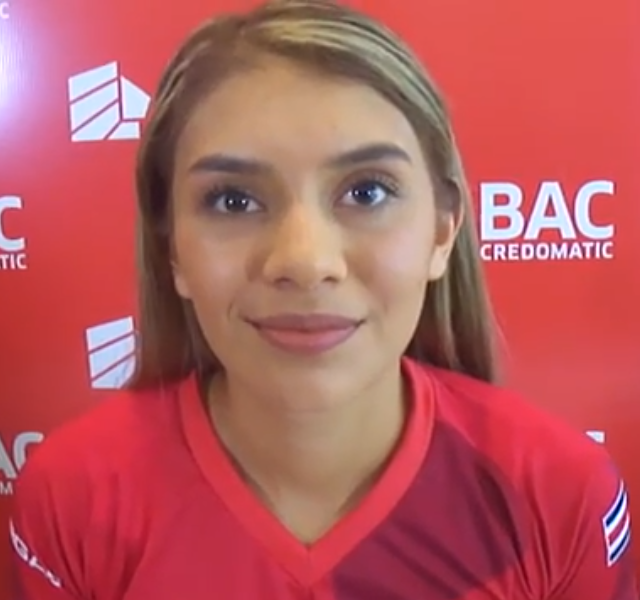
- In a 2019 interview

Personal information
- Full name: Noelia Vargas Mena
- Born: 17 April 2000 (age 25)

Sport
- Country: Costa Rica
- Event: Racewalking

Noelia Vargas Mena (born 17 April 2000) is a Costa Rican racewalker. She competed in the women's 20 kilometres walk at the 2020 Summer Olympics in Tokyo, Japan. In 2019, she competed in the women's 20 kilometres walk event at the 2019 World Athletics Championships held in Doha, Qatar. She finished in 36th place with a time of 1:46:30. She also competed in the same event at the 2022 World Athletics Championships in Eugene, Oregon, United States.

In 2018, Vargas competed in the women's 10,000 metres walk at the IAAF World U20 Championships in Tampere, Finland. She finished in 9th place.

Vargas competed in the women's 20 kilometres walk event at the 2019 Pan American Games in Lima, Peru. She finished in 6th place with a personal best of 1:33:09.
