= Kashani Ríos =

Panamanian high jumper

Personal information
- Nationality: Panamanian
- Born: February 7, 1991 (age 35)
- Height: 1.69 m (5 ft 6 1/2 in)
- Weight: 56 kg (123 lb)

Sport
- Country: (Panama)
- Sport: Athletics
- Event: High jump

Achievements and titles
- Personal best: High jump: 1.84 m (2012

Kashani Isamara Ríos Miller (born 7 February 1991) is a female Panamanian track and field athlete who specialises in the high jump. She holds a personal best of 1.84 m (6 ft 1/4 in), set in 2012, which is the Panamanian national record and the best by any Central American woman. She has represented her country at the 2015 Pan American Games, 2014 South American Games and the 2011 Summer Universiade. She was a bronze medallist at the South American Championships in Athletics.

She attended the University of Panama.

== International competitions ==
Year	Competition	Venue	Position	Event	Notes
2005	Central American Youth Championships	Managua, Nicaragua	1st	High jump	1.55 m
2005	Central American Youth Championships	Managua, Nicaragua	2nd	4 × 100 m relay	52.76
2005	Central American Youth Championships	Managua, Nicaragua	3rd	1000 m relay	4:25.58
2007	Central American Youth Championships	San Salvador, El Salvador	1st	High jump	1.62 m CR
2007	Central American Youth Championships	San Salvador, El Salvador	3rd	1000 m medley relay	2:23.72
2006	Central American Youth Championships	Guatemala City, Guatemala	1st	High jump	1.61 m
2006	Central American Youth Championships	Guatemala City, Guatemala	1st	4 × 100 m relay	51.82
2008	Central American Youth Championships	San Salvador, El Salvador	1st	High jump	1.67 m CR
2008	South American Youth Championships	Lima, Peru	3rd	High jump	1.63 m
2010	Central American Junior Championships	Panama City, Panama	1st	High jump	1.68 m
2010	Central American Junior Championships	Panama City, Panama	2nd	4 × 100 m relay	51.47
2010	Central American Games	Panama City, Panama	2nd	High jump	1.60 m
2010	Central American Games	Panama City, Panama	2nd	4 × 100 m relay	48.85
2010	Central American Championships	Guatemala City, Guatemala	1st	High jump	1.70 m
2010	Central American Championships	Guatemala City, Guatemala	2nd	4 × 100 m relay	49.46
2011	Central American Championships	San José, Costa Rica	1st	High jump	1.73 m
2011	Central American Championships	San José, Costa Rica	3rd	4 × 100 m relay	49.36
2011	Universiade	Shenzhen, China	20th	High jump	1.70 m
2011	Universiade	Shenzhen, China	8th (heats)	100 m	13.33
2012	Central American Championships	Managua, Nicaragua	1st	High jump	1.84 m CR NR
2012	Central American Championships	Managua, Nicaragua	2nd	4 × 100 m relay	47.79
2012	Ibero-American Championships	Barquisimeto, Venezuela	5th	High jump	1.78 m
2012	South American U23 Championships	São Paulo, Brazil	1st	High jump	1.76 m
2013	Central American Championships	Managua, Nicaragua	1st	High jump	1.80 m
2013	Central American Games	San José, Costa Rica	1st	4 × 100 m relay	46.66 GR
2013	Bolivarian Games	Trujillo, Peru	1st	High jump	1.79 m
2013	South American Championships	Cartagena, Colombia	3rd	High jump	1.73 m
2013	South American Championships	Cartagena, Colombia	6th	4 × 100 m relay	46.98
2014	South American Games	Santiago, Chile	2nd	High jump	1.76 m
2014	Central American Championships	Tegucigalpa, Honduras	1st	High jump	1.81 m
2014	Ibero-American Championships	São Paulo, Brazil	4th	High jump	1.70 m
2014	Pan American Sports Festival	Mexico City, Mexico	4th	High jump	1.80 m
2014	CAC Games	Xalapa, Mexico	3rd	High jump	1.80 m
2015	Central American Championships	Managua, Nicaragua	1st	High jump	1.75 m
2015	Pan American Games	Toronto, Canada	16th	High jump	1.70 m
