= Katy Sealy =

Belizean international athlete (born 1990)

Katy Louise Sealy (born 15 October 1990) is a Belizean international athlete. She was brought up in Suffolk in England but qualifies for Belize because her father was born there. She lived in Bawdsey.

Sealy was a heptathlete at the 2014 Commonwealth Games in Glasgow and carried the flag for Belize. She also competed as a heptathlete at the 2018 Commonwealth Games in the Gold Coast, Australia.

Despite being a previous Central American heptathlon champion, she failed to qualify for the heptathlon at the 2016 Summer Olympics in Rio de Janeiro. Sealy was however given a wildcard for the 100 metres hurdles which she competed in, finishing 7th in Heat 1. She has set a number of Belizean athletic records, including indoor 800 metres, high jump, and javelin throw.
