= List of Central American Games records in athletics =

Central American Games records in athletics are set by athletes competing from a range of member nations of the Organización Deportiva Centroamericana commonly known as ORDECA.

The Central American Games is a quadrennial event which began in 1973. The Games records in athletics are set by athletes who are representing one of the ORDECA's member federations.

== Men ==
Event	Record	Athlete	Nationality	Date	Meet	Place	Ref.
100 m	10.24 (−0.2 m/s)	Alonso Edward	Panama	16 April 2010	2010 Games	Panama City, Panama	
200 m	20.56 (+0.4 m/s)	Nery Brenes	Costa Rica	10 December 2017	2017 Games	Managua, Nicaragua	
400 m	46.64	Nery Brenes	Costa Rica	12 December 2017	2017 Games	Managua, Nicaragua	
800 m	1:48.41	Chamar Chambers	Panama	20 October 2025	2025 Games	Quetzaltenango, Guatemala	
1500 m	3:49.52	Mario Pop	Guatemala	9 December 2017	2017 Games	Managua, Nicaragua	
5000 m	14:22.71	Iván Gómez	Guatemala	November 1994	1994 Games	San Salvador, El Salvador	
10,000 m	29:31.9	José Morales	Guatemala	November 1994	1994 Games	San Salvador, El Salvador	
Marathon	2:22:56	Luis Rivero	Guatemala	17 December 2017	2017 Games	Managua, Nicaragua	
110 m hurdles	13.78 (−0.9 m/s) NR	Wienstan Mena	Guatemala	19 October 2025	2025 Games	Quetzaltenango, Guatemala	
400 m hurdles	50.18	Gerber Blanco	Guatemala	9 December 2017	2017 Games	Managua, Nicaragua	
3000 m steeplechase	8:54.43	Jhonny Loría	Costa Rica	December 1997	1997 Games	San Pedro Sula, Honduras	
High jump	2.10 m	Alexander Bowen	Panama	10 December 2017	2017 Games	Managua, Nicaragua	
Pole vault	5.05 m	Natán Rivera	El Salvador	11 December 2017	2017 Games	Managua, Nicaragua	
Long jump	8.19 m (±0.0 m/s)	Irving Saladino	Panama	17 April 2010	2010 Games	Panama City, Panama	
Triple jump	15.91 m	Maxwell Álvarez	Guatemala	7 March 2006	2006 Games	Managua, Nicaragua	
Shot put	15.88 m	Jaime Comandari	El Salvador	December 1997	1997 Games	San Pedro Sula, Honduras	
Discus throw	53.17 m	Winston Campbell	Honduras	18 October 2025	2025 Games	Quetzaltenango, Guatemala	
Hammer throw	66.74 m	Roberto Sawyers	Costa Rica	12 December 2017	2017 Games	Managua, Nicaragua	
Javelin throw	74.15 m	Iván Sibaja	Costa Rica	19 October 2025	2025 Games	Quetzaltenango, Guatemala	
Decathlon	6842 pts NWI	Guillermo Rivas	Guatemala	19 October 2025	2025 Games	Quetzaltenango, Guatemala	
Decathlon	100m / Long jump / Shot put / High jump / 400m / 110m H / Discus / Pole vault / Javelin / 1500m; 11.07 (+1.7 m/s) / 6.70 m (NWI) / 12.69 m / 1.85 m / 50.18 / 15.87 (+0.7 m/s) / 36.51 m / 4.15 m / 53.13 m / 5:11.48						
20 km walk (road)	1:26:41	Erick Barrondo	Guatemala	10 December 2017	2017 Games	Managua, Nicaragua	
35 km walk (road)	2:46:39	Bernardo Barrondo	Guatemala	10 December 2017	2017 Games	Managua, Nicaragua	
4 × 100 m relay	40.30 NR	Juan Carlos Rodríguez; Pablo Andrés Ibáñez; Estebán Ibáñez; José Andrés Salazar	El Salvador	20 October 2025	2025 Games	Quetzaltenango, Guatemala	
4 × 400 m relay	3:08.07	José Pablo Elizondo; Derick Leandro; Gerald Drummond; Gary Altamirano	Costa Rica	21 October 2025	2025 Games	Quetzaltenango, Guatemala	

Key:
^{WR} World record	^{NR} National record	^{A} affected by altitude

== Women ==
Event	Record	Athlete	Nationality	Date	Meet	Place	Ref.
100 m	11.66 (−1.1 m/s) =NR	Mariandrée Chacón	Guatemala	18 October 2025	2025 Games	Quetzaltenango, Guatemala	
200 m	23.54 (−0.1 m/s) NR	Mariandrée Chacón	Guatemala	19 October 2025	2025 Games	Quetzaltenango, Guatemala	
400 m	53.31	Cristal Cuervo	Panama	20 October 2025	2025 Games	Quetzaltenango, Guatemala	
800 m	2:02.52	Andrea Ferris	Panama	16 April 2010	2010 Games	Panama City, Panama	
1500 m	4:18.38	Andrea Ferris	Panama	18 April 2010	2010 Games	Panama City, Panama	
5000 m	17:08.62	Élida Hernández De Xuyá	Guatemala	9 March 2013	2013 Games	San José, Costa Rica	
10,000 m	36:04.41	Élida Hernández De Xuyá	Guatemala	11 March 2013	2013 Games	San José, Costa Rica	
Marathon	2:54:59	Gabriela Traña	Costa Rica	17 March 2013	2013 Games	San José, Costa Rica	
100 m hurdles	13.12 (+1.2 m/s) NR	Andrea Vargas	Costa Rica	10 December 2017	2017 Games	Managua, Nicaragua	
400 m hurdles	57.85	Gianna Woodruff	Panama	9 December 2017	2017 Games	Managua, Nicaragua	
3000 m steeplechase	10:04.19	Andrea Ferris	Panama	12 December 2017	2017 Games	Managua, Nicaragua	
High jump	1.75 m	Ana Quiñónez	Guatemala	December 1997	1997 Games	San Pedro Sula, Honduras	
Pole vault	3.40 m A	Michelle Rivera	El Salvador	30 November 2001	2001 Games	Guatemala City, Guatemala	
Long jump	6.17 m (−2.9 m/s)	Nathalee Aranda	Panama	9 December 2017	2017 Games	Managua, Nicaragua	
Triple jump	13.25 m (+0.4 m/s)	Estefany Cruz	Guatemala	December 2017	2017 Games	Managua, Nicaragua	
Shot put	13.28 m A	Eva Dimas	El Salvador	30 November 2001	2001 Games	Guatemala City, Guatemala	
Discus throw	54.58 m	Aixa Middleton	Panama	9 December 2017	2017 Games	Managua, Nicaragua	
Hammer throw	55.99 m A	Nancy Guillén	El Salvador	2 December 2001	2001 Games	Guatemala City, Guatemala	
Javelin throw	53.47 m	Dalila Rugama	Nicaragua	10 December 2017	2017 Games	Managua, Nicaragua	
Heptathlon	4920 pts NR	Ana María Porras	Costa Rica	9–10 December 2017	2017 Games	Managua, Nicaragua	
Heptathlon	100m H / High jump / Shot put / 200m / Long jump / Javelin / 800m; 14.62 (−0.4 m/s) / 1.70 m / 10.06 m / 26.29 (−0.4 m/s) / 5.49 m (−2.4 m/s) / 30.16 m / 2:30.13						
20 km walk (road)	1:35:14	Mirna Ortiz	Guatemala	10 December 2017	2017 Games	Managua, Nicaragua	
4 × 100 m relay	46.35 NR	Tracy Joseph; Andrea Vargas; Maria Murillo; Desire Bermúdez	Costa Rica	11 December 2017	2017 Games	Managua, Nicaragua	
4 × 400 m relay	3:44.04	Irma Harris; Desire Bermúdez; Daniela Rojas; Sharolyn Scott	Costa Rica	12 December 2017	2017 Games	Managua, Nicaragua	

Key:
^{WR} World record	^{NR} National record	^{A} affected by altitude

== Records in defunct events ==
=== Men's events ===
Event	Record	Name	Nation	Date	Meet	Place	Ref.
20,000 m (track)	1:11:45.39	Miguel Toruño	Nicaragua	5 March 2006	2006 Games	Managua, Nicaragua	
10,000 m walk (track)	1:03:20.03	Melvin González	Nicaragua	6 March 2006	2006 Games	Managua, Nicaragua	
50 km walk (road)	4:08:21	Julio César Urías	Guatemala	November 1994	1994 Games	San Salvador, El Salvador	

=== Women's events ===
Event	Record	Name	Nation	Date	Meet	Place	Ref.
3000 m	10:10.64	Thelma Zúñiga	Costa Rica	November 1994	1994 Games	San Salvador, El Salvador	
Pentathlon	2977 pts A	Yolanda Knight	Panama	November 1973	1973 Games	Guatemala City, Guatemala	
10,000 m walk (track)	50:27	Ivis Martínez	El Salvador	December 1997	1997 Games	San Pedro Sula, Honduras	
