= 2019 Central American Championships in Athletics =

XXX Central American Championships in Athletics
- Dates: 22–23 June
- Host city: Managua, Nicaragua
- Venue: Estadio Olímpico del IND Managua
- Level: Senior
- Events: 44
- Participation: 7 nations

The 30th Central American Championships in Athletics were held at the Estadio Olímpico del IND in Managua, Nicaragua, between 22 and 23 June 2019.

A total of 44 events were contested, 22 by men, 22 by women.

== Medal summary ==
=== Men ===
Event	Gold		Silver		Bronze	
100 metres (wind: +2.7 m/s)	José Andrés Salazar; El Salvador	10.42	Melique García; Honduras	10.44	Brandon Jones; Belize	10.46
200 metres (wind: +1.3 m/s)	Yariel Matute; Honduras	21.16	José Andrés Salazar; El Salvador	21.23	José Humberto Bermúdez; Guatemala	21.45
400 metres	José Humberto Bermúdez; Guatemala	46.50	Gerald Drummond; Costa Rica	46.71	George Erazo; El Salvador	47.70
800 metres	Chamar Chambers; Panama	1:50.89	Josué Murcia; Costa Rica	1:55.02	Aaron Guadamuz; Nicaragua	1:57.03
1500 metres	Georman Rivas; Costa Rica	3:53.36	César Peraza; El Salvador	3:56.17	Mario Sucup; Guatemala	3:56.38
5000 metres	Mario Sucup; Guatemala	14:49.88	Daniel Johanning; Costa Rica	14:58.86	Alberto Gónzalez; Guatemala	15:20.23
10,000 metres	Daniel Johanning; Costa Rica	31:15.86	Alberto Gónzalez; Guatemala	32:30.13	Roger Castellón; Nicaragua	33:01.63
110 metres hurdles (wind: +0.9 m/s)	Wienstan Mena; Guatemala	14.14	Williams Ríos; Panama	14.31	Renán Palma; El Salvador	14.46
400 metres hurdles	Gerald Drummond; Costa Rica	50.16	Emmanuel Niño; Costa Rica	50.70	Pablo Andrés Ibáñez; El Salvador	50.96
3000 metres steeplechase	César Peraza; El Salvador	9:29.58	Brayan Tacan; Guatemala	9:41.97	Daniel Gónzalez; Panama	9:43.01
4 × 100 metres relay	Costa Rica; Brayan Guzman; Shermal Calimore; Jeikob Monge; Héctor Allen	40.44 CR	Panama; Andrés Woodroff; Alberto Murrell; Williams Ríos; Mateo Edward	41.52	Guatemala; Wienstan Mena; Fredy Lemus; José Humberto Bermúdez; Allan Najarro	41.54
4 × 400 metres relay	Costa Rica; Gary Robinson; Jeikob Monge; José Elizondo; Gerald Drummond	3:13.00	El Salvador; George Erazo; José Andrés Salazar; Piero Braghieri; Pablo Andrés Ibáñez	3:17.98	Panama; Chamar Chambers; Williams Ríos; Diddier Rodríguez; Andrés Woodroff	3:17.98
10,000 metres track walk	José Oswaldo Calel; Guatemala	44:42.23	José Gilberto Menjívar; El Salvador	44:04.35	Allan Segura; Costa Rica	46:24.06
High jump	Ken Fransua; Guatemala	2.08	David Bosques; Panama	2.08	Rasheed Miller; Costa Rica	1.90
Pole vault	Christiaan Higueros; Guatemala	4.20	Julio Flores; Nicaragua	4.00	Marcos Rivera; El Salvador	4.00
Long jump	Becker Jarquín; Nicaragua	7.10	Ángel Suárez; Nicaragua	7.09	Rasheed Miller; Costa Rica	7.04
Triple jump	Brandon Jones; Belize	15.48	Fredy Lemus; Guatemala	15.34	Becker Jarquín; Nicaragua	13.51
Shot put	Anselmo Delgado; Panama	14.86	Cojac Smith; Belize	13.53	Winston Campbell; Honduras	13.52
Discus throw	Winston Campbell; Honduras	47.23	Enrique Martínez; El Salvador	42.49	Elías Gómez; Costa Rica	40.60
Hammer throw	Dylan Suárez; Costa Rica	56.49	Enrique Martínez; El Salvador	55.10	Carlos Arteaga; Nicaragua	52.82
Javelin throw	Jonathan Cedeño; Panama	66.21	Iván Sibaja; Costa Rica	59.00	Juan Bladimir García; Nicaragua	58.26
Decathlon	Estebán Ibáñez; El Salvador	6026	Youssef Qasem; Guatemala	5950	Edgar Nieto; Panama	5578

=== Women ===
Event	Gold		Silver		Bronze	
100 metres (wind: +0.6 m/s)	Hilary Gladden; Belize	11.71	Shantely Scott; Costa Rica	11.85	Keylin Pennant; Costa Rica	11.99
200 metres (wind: +1.3 m/s)	Samantha Dirks; Belize	23.97	Shantely Scott; Costa Rica	24.35	Ingrid Narváez; Nicaragua	25.15
400 metres	Desiré Bermúduez; Costa Rica	53.46 CR	Daniela Rojas; Costa Rica	56.20	Ingrid Narváez; Nicaragua	57.02
800 metres	Lissette Ramírez; Costa Rica	2:17.23	Daniela Aragón; El Salvador	2:17.47	Mónica Vargas; Costa Rica	2:19.74
1500 metres	Andrea Ferris; Panama	4:28.34	Mónica Vargas; Costa Rica	4:53.23	Mayela Menjívar; El Salvador	4:55.82
5000 metres	Noelia Vargas; Costa Rica	18:05.28	Aldy Gonzales; Honduras	18:25.26	Idelma Delgado; El Salvador	18:35.97
10,000 metres	Cindy Monterroso; Guatemala	39:27.49	Aldy Gonzales; Honduras	39:40.76	Idelma Delgado; El Salvador	39:43.69
100 metres hurdles (wind: +3.9 m/s)	Andrea Vargas; Costa Rica	12.79	Nancy Sandoval; El Salvador	14.27	Reimy Irving; Panama	14.88
400 metres hurdles	Gianna Woodruff; Panama	57.78 CR	Daniela Rojas; Costa Rica	58.65	Leyka Archibold; Panama	63.49
3000 metres steeplechase	Andrea Ferris; Panama	10:16.23 CR	Leidy Pocón; Guatemala	11:46.70	Mayela Menjívar; El Salvador	12:12.10
4 × 100 metres relay	Costa Rica; Shantely Scott; Andrea Vargas; Desiré Bermúdez; Keylin Pennant	46.00 CR	Panama; Ruth Casandra; Gianna Woodruff; Rosa Mosquera; Leyka Archibold	46.42	Belize; Hilary Gladden; Faith Morris; Samantha Dirks; Tricia Flores	47.00
4 × 400 metres relay	Costa Rica; Shantely Scott; Daniela Rojas; Lissette Ramírez; Desiré Bermúdez	3:44.40 CR	Nicaragua; Ingrid Narváez; Nayeli Mendoza; Suan Reyes; Ariana Rivera	4:03.94	El Salvador; Nathalie Almendárez; Mayela Menjívar; Adriana Andrade; Daniela Aragón	4:03.94
10,000 metres track walk	Noelia Vargas; Costa Rica	48:31.52	Yasury Palacios; Guatemala	49:35.41	Crismary Moreno; Nicaragua	1:11:40.45
High jump	Kashany Ríos; Panama	1.69	Vianka González; Costa Rica	1.66	Katy Sealy; Belize	1.66
Pole vault	Andrea Velasco; El Salvador	3.60 CR	Aimee Zelaya; Honduras	2.60	Rebeca Jara; Costa Rica	2.50
Long jump	Nathalee Aranda; Panama	6.39 CR	Thelma Fuentes; Guatemala	5.92	Melanie Foulkes; Costa Rica	5.31
Triple jump	Thelma Fuentes; Guatemala	13.05	Daneysha Robinson; Costa Rica	11.66	Rebeca Barrientos; El Salvador	11.40
Shot put	Dalila Rugama; Nicaragua	13.63	Haydee Grijalba; Costa Rica	11.14	Karina Espinoza; Guatemala	11.10
Discus throw	Aixa Middleton; Panama	52.31	Haydee Grijalba; Costa Rica	43.98	Alma Guitiérrez; Honduras	42.81
Hammer throw	Sonja Moreno; Guatemala	53.52	Viviana Abarca; Costa Rica	46.74	Dagmar Alvarado; Panama	46.21
Javelin throw	Dalila Rugama; Nicaragua	51.59	Genova Arias; Costa Rica	40.66	Ester Padilla; Honduras	38.20
Heptathlon	Mariel Brokke; Costa Rica	4255	Ashly Vásquez; Nicaragua	3852	Sugey Espinoza; Nicaragua	3062

== Medal table ==
* Host nation (Nicaragua)

Rank	Nation	Gold	Silver	Bronze	Total
1	Costa Rica (CRC)	14	16	8	38
2	Guatemala (GUA)	9	7	5	21
3	Panama (PAN)	9	5	5	19
4	El Salvador (ESA)	4	9	9	22
5	Nicaragua (NIC)*	3	4	10	17
6	Honduras	2	4	3	9
Totals (6 entries)		41	45	40	126
