= List of Nicaraguan records in athletics =

The following are the national records in athletics in Nicaragua maintained by its national athletics federation: Federación Nicaragüense de Atletismo (FNA).

== Outdoor ==
Key to tables: Awaiting ratification Record not kept by FNA Not ratified or later rescinded by FNA

=== Men ===
Event	Record	Athlete	Date	Meet	Place	Ref.	Video
100 m	10.49 (+1.7 m/s)	Yeykell Romero	9 October 2021		Managua, Nicaragua		
100 m	10.47 (+1.0 m/s)	Yeykell Romero	23 May 2026	Panamanian Championships	Panama City, Panama		
200 m	21.48 (+1.1 m/s)	Yeykell Romero	26 June 2021	Central American Championships	San José, Costa Rica		
400 m	47.62	Yeykell Romero	22 June 2024	Costa Rican Championships	San José, Costa Rica		
800 m	1:49.10	Edgard Cortez	27 August 2011	World Championships	Daegu, South Korea		
1500 m	3:49.64	Eric Rodriguez	27 August 2015	World Championships	Beijing, China		
3000 m	8:43.4 h	Hugo Vásquez Tapia	29 November 1985		Havana, Cuba		
5000 m	14:46.5 h	William Aguirre	9 February 1989		Havana, Cuba		
10,000 m	30:25.25	William Aguirre	10 March 1989		Havana, Cuba		
Marathon	2:20:39	William Aguirre	13 January 1990		Tegucigalpa, Honduras		
110 m hurdles	15.70	Miguel Quesada	21 June 2008		San Salvador, El Salvador		
400 m hurdles	54.74	Lenin Vanegas	19 April 2010	Central American Junior Championships	Panama City, Panama		
3000 m steeplechase	9:03.0 h	Alvaro Vásquez	21 April 2012		Managua, Nicaragua		
High jump	1.98 m	Francisco Garth	10 December 2017	Central American Games	Managua, Nicaragua		
Pole vault	4.55 m	Julio Flores	27 June 2021	Central American Championships	San José, Costa Rica		
Long jump	7.46 m (+1.5 m/s)	Becker Jarquín	14 July 2018	Central American Championships	Guatemala City, Guatemala		
Triple jump	15.36 m (+0.4 m/s)	Angel Suarez	12 December 2017	Central American Games	Managua, Nicaragua		
Shot put	15.13 m	Iván Turcios	17 June 1978		Managua, Nicaragua]		
Discus throw	48.63 m	Armando Mejia	14 February 1971		Managua, Nicaragua		
Hammer throw	56.39 m	Carlos Arteaga	12 December 2017	Central American Games	Managua, Nicaragua		
Hammer throw	61.45 m	Carlos Arteaga	21 December 2024	Evaluativo Selecciones Nacionales	Managua, Nicaragua		
Javelin throw	71.62 m	Rigoberto José Calderon	17 July 1997		Guadalajara, Mexico		
Decathlon	6195 pts h	Donald Velez	6–7 March 1970	Central American and Caribbean Games	Panama City, Panama		
Decathlon	100m (wind) / Long jump (wind) / Shot put / High jump / 400m / 110m H (wind) / Discus / Pole vault / Javelin / 1500m; 11.5 / 6.03 m / 12.63 m / 1.70 m / 53.2 / 15.9 / 35.20 m / 3.50 m / 62.94 m / 5:11.7						
10,000 m walk (track)	43:14.88	Gabriel Alvarado	2 May 2021	Nicaraguan U18 and U20 Racewalking Championships	Managua, Nicaragua		
20 km walk (road)	1:29:30	Luis Canelo	23 January 1989		Ranchuelo, Cuba		
50 km walk (road)	4:23:55	Luis Canelo	2 April 1989		Ranchuelo, Cuba		
4 × 100 m relay	41.59	Nicaragua; Hárold Pérez; Humberto Newball; Roberto Guillén; Gary Lisby	15 June 1986		Havana, Cuba		
4 × 400 m relay	3:17.69	Nicaragua; Daniel Aleman; Jose Veliz; Humberto Lugo; Lenin Vanegas	23 June 2013	Central American Championships	Managua, Nicaragua		

=== Women ===
Event	Record	Athlete	Date	Meet	Place	Ref.
100 m	11.79 (+1.8 m/s)	María Carmona	28 June 2025	Salvadoran Championships	San Salvador, El Salvador	
200 m	23.61 (+1.2 m/s)	María Carmona	5 August 2026	Central American and Caribbean Games	Santo Domingo, Dominican Republic	
400 m	53.90	María Carmona	20 October 2025	Central American Games	Quetzaltenango, Guatemala	
800 m	2:07.1 h	Xiomara Larios	6 June 1980		Santiago, Cuba	
1500 m	4:46.1 h	Xiomara Larios	2 December 1979		Managua, Nicaragua	
3000 m	10:30.1 h	Reyna Obando	30 August 2002		London, United Kingdom	
5000 m	18:01.70	Aldy Villalobos	30 August 2009		Managua, Nicaragua	
10,000 m	39:31.29	Yelka Mairena	2 July 2017		Tegucigalpa, Honduras	
Marathon	3:07:13	Yelka Mairena	17 December 2017	Central American Games	Managua, Nicaragua	
100 m hurdles	14.75 (+0.1 m/s)	Ariana Rivera	13 April 2019	Bojangles Classic	Columbia, United States	
400 m hurdles	1:02.74	Jessica Aguilera	18 February 2006		Managua, Nicaragua	
3000 m steeplechase	11:41.0 h	Yelka Mairena	17 April 2011		Managua, Nicaragua	
High jump	1.69 m	Lilian Green	19 May 1989		Managua, Nicaragua	
Pole vault	2.80 m	Ana Granados	12 December 2017	Central American Games	Managua, Nicaragua	
Long jump	5.44 m	Ana Patricia Traña	11 December 1997		San Pedro Sula, Honduras	
Triple jump	11.95 m	Ana Patricia Traña	20 August 1998		Maracaibo, Venezuela	
Shot put	13.73 m	Dalila Rugama	1 June 2019		Managua, Nicaragua	
Discus throw	48.40 m	Dalila Rugama	10 March 2013		San José, Costa Rica	
Hammer throw	44.63 m	Marisol Zeledón	12 December 2017	Central American Games	Managua, Nicaragua	
Javelin throw	55.28 m	Dalila Rugama	10 May 2007		Caracas, Venezuela	
Heptathlon	4488 pts	Jarey Vásquez	9–10 December 2017	Central American Games	Managua, Nicaragua	
Heptathlon	100m H (wind) / High jump / Shot put / 200m (wind) / Long jump (wind) / Javelin / 800m; 16.44 (−0.4 m/s) / 1.52 m / 10.09 m / 26.54 (−0.4 m/s) / 5.10 m (−1.5 m/s) / 32.26 m / 2:22.38					
10,000 m walk (track)	52:52.60	Maria José Cortes Blandon	19 July 2016	World Junior Championships	Bydgoszcz, Poland	
10 km walk (road)	55:49	Glenda Ubeda	22 January 2017	Guatemalan Race Walking Championships	Managua, Nicaragua	
20 km walk (road)	1:45:59	María Cortez	10 December 2017	Central American Games	Managua, Nicaragua	
4 × 100 m relay	48.16	Nicaragua; Janahi Cornejo; María Carmona; María Lacayo; Ingrid Narváez	11 December 2017	Central American Games	Managua, Nicaragua	
4 × 400 m relay	3:52.49	Nicaragua; I. Narváes; Jéssica Aguilera; K. Cuadra; V. Romero	19 April 2010	Central American Games	Panama City, Panama	

== Indoor ==
=== Men ===
Event	Record	Athlete	Date	Meet	Place	Ref.
60 m	6.79	Armando Colome	20 February 2021		Pittsburg, United States	
200 m	22.21	Armando Colome	25 February 2023	NSIC Championships	Mankato, United States	
400 m	49.88	Kelvin Ramírez	2 March 2018	World Championships	Birmingham, United Kingdom	
800 m	1:56.54	Carlos Mairena	10 March 1995	World Championships	Barcelona, Spain	
1500 m	3:58.37	Erick Rodríguez	18 March 2016	World Championships	Portland, United States	
3000 m						
60 m hurdles						
High jump						
Pole vault						
Long jump	5.85 m	Kelton Acuna	23 January 2011	Journée Des Régionaux	Mondeville, France	
Triple jump						
Shot put						
Heptathlon						
Heptathlon	60m / Long jump / Shot put / High jump / 60m H / Pole vault / 1000m					
5000 m walk						
4 × 400 m relay						

=== Women ===
Event	Record	Athlete	Date	Meet	Place	Ref.
60 m	7.75	Maria Carmona	25 January 2025	Antequera Indoor Match	Antequera, Spain	
200 m	24.88	Maria Carmona	25 January 2025	Antequera Indoor Match	Antequera, Spain	
400 m						
800 m						
1500 m						
3000 m						
60 m hurdles						
High jump						
Pole vault						
Long jump						
Triple jump						
Shot put						
Pentathlon						
Pentathlon	60m H / High jump / Shot put / Long jump / 800m					
3000 m walk						
4 × 400 m relay						
