= 2025 Central American Championships in Athletics =

XXXV Central American Championships in Athletics
- Dates: 2–3 August
- Host city: Managua, Nicaragua
- Venue: Estadio Olímpico del IND Managua
- Level: Senior
- Events: 44
- Participation: 7 nations
- Records set: 7 CR

The 35th Central American Championships in Athletics were held at the Estadio Olímpico del IND Managua in Managua, Nicaragua, on 2 and 3 August 2025.

A total of 44 events were contested, 22 by men, 21 by women, as well as one mixed event.

== Medal summary ==
=== Men ===
Event	Gold		Silver		Bronze	
100 metres (wind: +0.9 m/s)	Arturo Deliser; Panama	10.17	Alejandro Ricketts; Costa Rica	10.43	Melique García; Honduras	10.61
200 metres (wind: +1.3 m/s)	Arturo Deliser; Panama	20.57	Alejandro Ricketts; Costa Rica	21.21	Melique García; Honduras	21.34
400 metres	Derick Leandro; Costa Rica	47.98	Gary Altamirano; Costa Rica	47.98	Samuel Ibarra; Panama	48.40
800 metres	Aaron Hernández; El Salvador	1:52.29	José Pablo Elizondo; Costa Rica	1:53.67	Jon Díaz; El Salvador	1:54.56
1500 metres	Aaron Hernández; El Salvador	3:52.82	Francisco Brenes; Costa Rica	3:55.10	Marcos Cruz; Guatemala	3:55.21
5000 metres	Mario Pacay; Guatemala	14:56.68	Daniel Johanning; Costa Rica	15:01.84	Esteban Oses; Costa Rica	15:08.06
10,000 metres	Daniel Johanning; Costa Rica	30:39.00	Óscar Aldana; El Salvador	31:55.16	Benjamín Jiménez; El Salvador	33:19.18
110 metres hurdles (wind: +2.1 m/s)	Wienstan Mena; Guatemala	13.95	Estebán Ibáñez; El Salvador	13.95	Gabriel Mejía; Honduras	14.64
400 metres hurdles	Gerald Drummond; Costa Rica	49.11	Pablo Andrés Ibáñez; El Salvador	49.91	Samuel Ibáñez; El Salvador	54.17
3000 metres steeplechase	Diddier Rodríguez; Panama	9:02.08	Paulo Gómez; Costa Rica	9:18.78	Marcos Cruz; Guatemala	9:37.63
4 × 100 metres relay	Costa Rica; José Ramón Whittaker; Shamayl Kooper; Alejandro Ricketts; Rasheed Miller	40.96	El Salvador; Juan Carlos Rodríguez; Estebán Ibáñez; José Fabricio Marroquín; José Andrés Salazar	41.05	Nicaragua; Edgard Claro; Fredd Ponce; Douglas Calero; Yeykell Romero	42.28
20,000 metres track walk	Erick Barrondo; Guatemala	1:30:14.97	Juan Manuel Calderon; Costa Rica	1:30:30.02	José Ortiz; Guatemala	1:32:25.45
High jump	Denceel Álvarez; Guatemala	1.96	Ariel Molina; El Salvador	1.93	Andrés Núñez; Costa Rica	1.93
Pole vault	Diego Navas; El Salvador	4.60	Guillermo Rivas; Guatemala	4.10	Denzel Ponce; Costa Rica	4.10
Long jump	Rasheed Miller; Costa Rica	7.89	Estebán Ibáñez; El Salvador	6.99	Juan Mosquera; Panama	6.74
Shot put	Winston Campbell; Honduras	14.69	Billy López; Guatemala	14.60	Anselmo Delgado; Panama	14.45
Discus throw	Jeims Molina; Costa Rica	52.02	Winston Campbell; Honduras	49.50	Guillermo Rivas; Guatemala	40.71
Hammer throw	Carlos Arteaga; Nicaragua	62.35	Dylan Suárez; Costa Rica	62.02	David Ayala; El Salvador	62.02
Decathlon	Osman Sanders; El Salvador	4553	Camilo Menjívar; Nicaragua	3347	Only two starters	

=== Women ===
Event	Gold		Silver		Bronze	
100 metres (wind: +2.3 m/s)	Mariandre Chacón; Guatemala	11.53	Rori Lowe; Honduras	11.70	María Alejandra Carmona; Nicaragua	11.84
200 metres (wind: +3.4 m/s)	Mariandre Chacón; Guatemala	23.19	María Alejandra Carmona; Nicaragua	23.58	Cristal Cuervo; Panama	23.62
400 metres	Cristal Cuervo; Panama	53.58	María Alejandra Carmona; Nicaragua	54.35	Desire Bermúdez; Costa Rica	54.70
800 metres	Antonella Lanuza; Costa Rica	2:19.49	Débora Quel; Guatemala	2:19.94	Suyeris Guerra; Panama	2:23.48
1500 metres	Antonella Lanuza; Costa Rica	4:49.38	Débora Quel; Guatemala	4:50.04	María Nellys Chaves; Costa Rica	4:51.98
5000 metres	Yessica Espinal; Honduras	18:25.21	María Nellys Chaves; Costa Rica	18:28.43	Wendy Ascencio; El Salvador	18:43.27
10,000 metres	Sandra Raxón; Guatemala	NT	Yessica Espinal; Honduras	NT	Idelma Delgado; El Salvador	NT
100 metres hurdles (wind: +2.0 m/s)	Andrea Vargas; Costa Rica	13.28	Leyka Archibold; Panama	13.66	Nathalie Almendárez; El Salvador	13.67
400 metres hurdles	Daniela Rojas; Costa Rica	57.75	Leyka Archibold; Panama	60.28	Mariangel Núñez; Costa Rica	60.67
3000 metres steeplechase	Sofía Urizar; Guatemala	11:35.98	María Nellys Chaves; Costa Rica	11:41.65	Esmeralda Ríos; Nicaragua	11:53.59
4 × 100 metres relay	Panama; Ivanna McFarlane; Cristal Cuervo; Leyka Archibold; Natalie Aranda	47.27	El Salvador; Nancy Sandoval; Nathalie Almendarez; Natalie Barrientos; Shantelly Scott	47.64	Costa Rica; Rihana Mora; Mariel Brokke; Valeria Oviedo; Andrea Vargas	47.83
20,000 metres track walk	Mirna Ortiz; Guatemala	1:42:57.08	Sharon Herrera; Costa Rica	1:43:00.09	Yaquelin Teletor; Guatemala	1:44:30.34
High jump	Abigail Obando; Costa Rica	1.70	Ana González; El Salvador	1.70	Ángela González; Panama	1.55
Pole vault	Andrea Velasco; El Salvador	3.60	Norma Canossa; Costa Rica	3.30	Only two athletes with a valid mark	
Long jump	Natalie Aranda; Panama	6.15	Brooklyn Lyttle; Belize	5.77	Daneysha Robinson; Costa Rica	5.50
Triple jump	Thelma Fuentes; Guatemala	12.34	Danisha Chimilio; Guatemala	12.30	Daneysha Robinson; Costa Rica	11.65
Shot put	Prizila Negrete; Honduras	13.10	Deisheline Mayers; Costa Rica	12.95	Débora Méndez; Guatemala	11.28
Discus throw	Estefani Sosa; Guatemala	43.14	Prizila Negrete; Honduras	40.93	Luna Mora; Costa Rica	40.67
Hammer throw	Sophie Pérez; Guatemala	59.35	María José Soto; El Salvador	46.64	Lindsay Reyes; Costa Rica	43.49
Javelin throw	Esperanza Sibaja; Nicaragua	47.55	Esther Padilla; Honduras	44.84	Deisheline Mayers; Costa Rica	41.59
Heptathlon	Stephanie Hernández; Honduras	2746	Ana Gabriela Granados; Nicaragua	2726	Andrea Bardales; Honduras	2042

=== Mixed ===
Event	Gold		Silver		Bronze	
4 × 400 metres relay	Nicaragua; Fredd Ponce; Ingrid Narváez; Yeykell Romero; María Alejandra Carmona	3:28.70	Costa Rica; Derick Leandro; Angeline Pondler; José Pablo Elizondo; Melissa Ramírez	3:29.92	El Salvador; Joseph Hernández; Ashly Benítez; Samuel Ibáñez; Ana Isabella Gonzalez	3:36.70

== Medal table ==
* Host nation (Nicaragua)

Rank	Nation	Gold	Silver	Bronze	Total
1	Guatemala (GUA)	12	5	6	23
2	Costa Rica (CRC)	11	16	11	38
3	Panama (PAN)	6	2	6	14
4	El Salvador (ESA)	4	9	9	22
5	Honduras	3	4	3	10
6	Nicaragua (NCA)*	3	2	3	8
7	Belize (BIZ)	0	1	0	1
Totals (7 entries)		39	39	38	116
