= 2026 Central American Championships in Athletics =

XXXVI Central American Championships in Athletics
- Dates: 6–7 June
- Host city: Managua, Nicaragua
- Venue: Estadio Olímpico del IND Managua
- Level: Senior
- Events: 44
- Participation: 148 athletes from 7 nations
- Records set: 1 CR

The 36th Central American Championships in Athletics were held at the Estadio Olímpico del IND Managua in Managua, Nicaragua, on 6 and 7 June 2026.

A total of 45 events were contested, 22 by men, 21 by women, as well as two mixed events.

== Medal summary ==
=== Men ===
Event	Gold		Silver		Bronze	
100 metres (wind: +0.9 m/s)	Arturo Deliser; Panama	10.30	Alejandro Ricketts; Costa Rica	10.42	Héctor Allen; Costa Rica	10.49
200 metres (wind: -1.2 m/s)	Arturo Deliser; Panama	21.05	Héctor Allen; Costa Rica	21.66	Brandon Jones; Belize	21.73
400 metres	Milton Rodríguez; Nicaragua	47.68	Isaac Mora; Costa Rica	47.79	Gary Altamirano; Costa Rica	47.94
800 metres	Francisco Brenes; Costa Rica	1:49.33	Jon Díaz; El Salvador	1:50.22	Aaron Hernández; El Salvador	1:50.67
1500 metres	Aaron Hernández; El Salvador	4:01.42	Esteban Oses; Costa Rica	4:01.73	Jordy Méndez; Costa Rica	4:02.02
5000 metres	Daniel Johanning; Costa Rica	14:33.86	Franklin Álvarez; Guatemala	15:06.24	Robin Aguilar; Costa Rica	15:32.37
10,000 metres	Daniel Johanning; Costa Rica	31:05.61	Franklin Álvarez; Guatemala	31:58.18	José Cedeño; Panama	33:33.32
110 metres hurdles (wind: +1.1 m/s)	Esteban Josué Ibáñez; El Salvador	14.09	Gabriel Mejía; Honduras	14.26	Gino Toscano; Panama	14.93
400 metres hurdles	Pablo Andrés Ibáñez; El Salvador	50.05	Gino Toscano; Panama	56.96	Alejandro Sánchez; Nicaragua	60.79
3000 metres steeplechase	Marcos Cruz; Guatemala	9:08.78	Robin Aguilar; Costa Rica	9:22.23	Daniel González; Panama	9:29.83
4 × 100 metres relay	Costa Rica; Andrew Escoe; Gary Altamiran; Isaac Mora; Héctor Allen	41.72	Nicaragua; Alexander Olivas; Alejandro Sánchez; Douglas Calero; Yeykell Romero	42.23	El Salvador; Daniel Machado; Joseph Hernández; Esteban Josué Ibáñez; Julio Martínez	43.05
4 × 400 metres relay	El Salvador; Julio Martínez; Esteban Josué Ibáñez; Joseph Hernández; Pablo Andrés Ibáñez	3:12.89	Costa Rica; Isaac Mora; José Pablo Elizondo; Francisco Brenes; Gary Altamirano	3:13.63	Nicaragua; Eliezer Zeledón; Joaquín Bello; Yeykell Romero; Milton Rodríguez	3:23.37
Half marathon race walk	Erick Barrondo; Guatemala	1:35:47	Jhoshua Monterroso; Guatemala	1:37:08	Only two competitors	
High jump	Ariel Molina; El Salvador	1.99	Denceel Álvarez; Guatemala	1.96	Andrés Núñez; Costa Rica	1.93
Pole vault	Denzel Ponce; Costa Rica	4.50	Daniel Machado; El Salvador	4.40	Osman Sanders; Nicaragua	3.70
Long jump	Rasheed Miller; Costa Rica	7.85 CR	Miguel Aronategui; Panama	6.91	Gabriel Mejía; Honduras	6.77
Triple jump	Jason Castro; Honduras	15.42	Fernando Reyes; El Salvador	15.40	Brandon Jones; Belize	15.08
Shot put	Billy López; Guatemala	15.04	Winston Campbell; Honduras	14.33	Leonel Rivas; Guatemala	13.88
Discus throw	Winston Campbell; Honduras	52.02	Máximo Mongalo; Nicaragua	37.53	Billy López; Guatemala	34.03
Hammer throw	Carlos Arteaga; Nicaragua	64.27	Dylan Suárez; Costa Rica	59.63	Luis Puerto; Honduras	43.39
Javelin throw	Iván Sibaja; Costa Rica	69.73	Leonel Rivas; Guatemala	58.35	Carlos Espinosa; Panama	49.56
Decathlon	Osman Sanders; El Salvador	6091	Camilo Menjívar; Nicaragua	4799	Juan Fernando Álvarez; Honduras	4365

=== Women ===
Event	Gold		Silver		Bronze	
100 metres (wind: +0.4 m/s)	Mariandre Chacón; Guatemala	11.66	Rori Lowe; Honduras	11.76	María Alejandra Carmona; Nicaragua	11.86
200 metres (wind: -2.1 m/s)	Mariandre Chacón; Guatemala	23.85	Cristal Cuervo; Panama	23.87	Rori Lowe; Honduras	24.42
400 metres	Cristal Cuervo; Panama	53.83	Desire Bermúdez; Costa Rica	54.24	Melissa Ramírez; Costa Rica	55.64
800 metres	Angeline Pondler; Costa Rica	2:10.74	Antonella Lanuza; Costa Rica	2:19.49	Suyeris Guerra; Panama	2:23.48
1500 metres	Angeline Pondler; Costa Rica	4:39.03	María Nellys Chaves; Costa Rica	4:39.07	Antonella Lanuza; Costa Rica	4:43.18
5000 metres	Sandra Raxón; Guatemala	16:59.96	Suyeris Guerra; Panama	17:25.90	Idelma Delgado; El Salvador	18:21.20
10,000 metres	Heidy Villegas; Guatemala	34:39.72	Idelma Delgado; El Salvador	38:27.17	Only two competitors	
100 metres hurdles (wind: +0.8 m/s)	Nathalie Almendárez; El Salvador	13.60	Nancy Sandoval; El Salvador	13.76	Rihana Mora; Costa Rica	13.87
400 metres hurdles	Mariangel Núñez; Costa Rica	59.80	María Alejandra Alvarado; Nicaragua	61.13	Leyka Archibold; Panama	61.16
3000 metres steeplechase	María Nellys Chaves; Costa Rica	11:26.42	Krissia Martinez; El Salvador	11:50.64	Esmeralda Ríos; Nicaragua	11:53.59
4 × 100 metres relay	Panama; Ivanna McFarlane; Cristal Cuervo; Leyka Archibold; Natalie Aranda	46.52	Costa Rica; Shannell Perkins; Rihana Mora; Desiré Bermudez; Mariel Brokke	47.14	El Salvador; Nancy Sandoval; Nathalie Almendárez; Natalie Barrientos; Shantely Scott	47.66
4 × 400 metres relay	Costa Rica; Melissa Ramírez; Angeline Pondler; Mariangel Núñez; Desiré Bermudez	3:44.78	Panama; Leyka Archibold; Suyeris Guerra; Johan McFarlane; Cristal Cuervo	3:56.83	Nicaragua; Nayeli Mendoza; Esmeralda Ríos; Shelly Reyes; María Alejandra Alvarado	4:02.88
Half marathon walk	Yaquelin Teletor; Guatemala	1:46:05	Only one competitor			
High jump	Valentina Brenes; Costa Rica	1.65	Abigail Obando; Costa Rica	1.60	Only two competitors	
Pole vault	Andrea Velasco; El Salvador	3.80	Vielka Arias; Costa Rica	3.70	Norma Canossa; Costa Rica	3.30
Long jump	Natalie Aranda; Panama	6.27	Daneysha Robinson; Costa Rica	5.47	Natalie Barrientos; El Salvador	5.20
Triple jump	Thelma Fuentes; Guatemala	12.68	Danisha Chimilio; Guatemala	12.32	Daneysha Robinson; Costa Rica	11.82
Shot put	Deisheline Mayers; Costa Rica	13.51	Kaylin Myrie; Costa Rica	10.83	Stefanny Navarro; Costa Rica	10.55
Discus throw	Kaylin Myrie; Costa Rica	41.11	Luna Mora; Costa Rica	39.26	Dayana Paz; Honduras	32.03
Hammer throw	Gabrielle Figueroa; Honduras	52.27	María José Soto; El Salvador	52.03	Lindsay Reyes; Costa Rica	48.48
Javelin throw	Esther Padilla; Honduras	48.65	Esperanza Sibaja; Nicaragua	46.99	Deisheline Mayers; Costa Rica	41.67
Heptathlon	Abigail Obando; Costa Rica	4629	Elena Romero; Nicaragua	3622	Stephanie Hernández; Honduras	3306

=== Mixed ===
Event	Gold		Silver		Bronze	
4 × 100 metres relay	Nicaragua; Cristofer González; Shelly Reyes; Yeykell Romero; María Alejandra Carmona	43.27	Panama; Gino Toscano; Cristal Cuervo; Jaime Smith; Leyka Archibold	44.50	Belize; Brandon Jones; Kali Magana; Kamron Gentle; Nyasha Harris	45.08
4 × 400 metres relay	Costa Rica; Isaac Mora; Melissa Ramírez; Gary Altamirano; Desiré Bermudez	3:29.98	El Salvador; Joseph Hernández; Krissia Martínez; Jon Díaz; Nathalie Barrientos	3:49.99	Belize; Frederick Usher Jr. Kendall Morgan; Donovan Grinage; Kali Magana	3:56.90

== Medal table ==
* Host nation (Nicaragua)

Rank	Nation	Gold	Silver	Bronze	Total
1	Costa Rica (CRC)	18	16	13	47
2	El Salvador (ESA)	7	10	5	22
3	Guatemala (GUA)	7	5	2	14
4	Panama (PAN)	5	7	6	18
5	Nicaragua (NCA)*	5	5	6	16
6	Honduras (HON)	4	3	6	13
7	Belize (BIZ)	0	0	6	6
Totals (7 entries)		46	46	44	136
