= Brooklyn Lyttle =

Belizean athlete (born 2008)

Personal information
- Nationality: Belizean
- Born: 19 September 2008 (age 17)

Sport
- Sport: Track and Field
- Event: Long jump

Achievements and titles
- Personal bests: Long jump: 6.48 m (2026) NR
Medal record
Women's athletics
Representing Belize
Central American and Caribbean Games
Silver medal – second place	2025 Managua	Long jump
CARIFTA Games (U20)
Gold medal – first place	2026 St George's	Long jump

Brooklyn Lyttle (born 19 September 2008) is a Belizean long jumper. She is the Belizean national record holder. She won the silver medal at the 2025 Central American Championships and the gold medal at the 2026 CARIFTA Games.

== Biography ==
Based in Maryland in the a United States, Lyttle attended Elizabeth Seton High School. In June 2023, Lyttle won four gold medals, and sets new Central American record age-group record in long jump at the 2023 CADICA U18-U20 Athletics Championships in Guatemala. She won the U18 100 metres, long jump, triple jump, and won a gold medal in the 4 x 100 m relay. Lyttle won the long jump with 5.82 metres setting a new Central American record, breaking the previous best set by Nathalee Aranda. In April 2024, Lyttle won the bronze medal in the long jump in the Under-17 category at the 2024 CARIFTA Games in Grenada.

Lyttle set a personal best in the long jump of 6.34 metres at the New Balance Nationals Outdoor in Philadelphia in June 2025, finishing runner-up to Elena Cooper. In August 2025, Lyttle won the silver medal in the long jump at the 2025 Central American Championships in Athletics in Managua, Nicaragua.

In April 2026, she won the gold medal at the 2026 CARIFTA Games in Grenada, with a best jump of 6.16 metres, the only athlete to pass six metres in the competition. She jumped 6.48 metres at the New Balance Nationals Outdoors in June and represented Belize in the long jump at the 2026 Commonwealth Games in Glasgow, Scotland, in July.
