= Athletics at the 2017 Central American Games =

Athletics at the XI Central American Games
- Dates: December 9–12, 2017
- Host city: Managua, Nicaragua
- Venue: Estadio Olímpico del IND Managua
- Level: Senior
- Events: 47 (24 men, 23 women)
- Participation: 194 (108 men, 86 women) athletes from 7 nations
- Records set: 22

Athletics competitions at the 2017 Central American Games were held at the Estadio Olímpico del IND Managua in Managua, Nicaragua, between December 9–12, 2017. The two marathon events were held on December 17, 2017.

== Medal summary ==
=== Men ===
Event	Gold		Silver		Bronze	
100 m (wind: +1.3 m/s)	Shermal Calimore; Costa Rica	10.39	Josef Norales; Honduras	10.46	Mateo Edward; Panama	10.48
200 m (wind: +0.4 m/s)	Nery Brenes; Costa Rica	20.56 CR	Shermal Calimore; Costa Rica	20.67	Virgilio Griggs; Panama	21.09
400 m	Nery Brenes; Costa Rica	46.64 CR	Gerald Drummond; Costa Rica	47.13	José Humberto Bermúdez; Guatemala	47.69
800 m	Juan Diego Castro Villalobos; Costa Rica	1:52.28	Elvin Canales Escoto; Honduras	1:52.92	Josué Francisco Murcia; Costa Rica	1:53.26
1500 m	Mario Pacay; Guatemala	3:49.52 CR	Juan Diego Castro Villalobos; Costa Rica	3:49.81	Erick Rodríguez; Nicaragua	3:54.08
5000 m	Juan Carlos Trujillo; Guatemala	15:09.49	Mario Pacay; Guatemala	15:11.92	Oscar Antonio Aldana; El Salvador	15:26.51
10000 m	Juan Carlos Trujillo; Guatemala	32:44.14	Mario Pacay; Guatemala	32:44.16	Oscar Antonio Aldana; El Salvador	32:44.98
110 m hurdles (wind: 3.3 m/s)	Wienstan Mena; Guatemala	14.24	Ronald Ramirez Leiva; Guatemala	14.66	Esteban Ibañez Guevara; El Salvador	15:97
400 m hurdles	Gerber Blanco; Guatemala	50.18 CR	Pablo Andrés Ibáñez; El Salvador	50.82	Emmanuel Niño Villalta; Costa Rica	50.88
3000 m steeplechase	Erick Rodríguez; Nicaragua	9:26.69	Alvaro Vasquez González; Nicaragua	9:38.69	David Escobar; El Salvador	9:52.11
4 × 100 m relay	Panama; Juan Mosquera; Mateo Edward; Virgilio Griggs; Jhamal Bowen	41.05	Belize; Rahin Monsanto; Brandon Terrel Jones; Mark Anderson; Shaun Gill	41.16	El Salvador; José Braghieri; José Salazar Mijangos; Fernando Bonilla Diaz; Juan Rodriguez	41.39
4 × 400 m relay	Costa Rica; Gary Robinson; Jeikob Monge; Emmanuel Niño Villalta; Gerald Drummond	3:13.98	Nicaragua; Marvin Castillo; Luis Alfaro; Kelvin Ramirez; Dexter Mayorga	3:19.21	El Salvador; Pablo Andrés Ibáñez; Juan Rodriguez; José Salazar Mijangos; José Braghieri	3:20.44
Marathon	Luis Carlo Rivero; Guatemala	2:22:56 CR	José Amado García; Guatemala	2:28:52	César Lizano; Costa Rica	2:29:58
20 km walk	Erick Barrondo; Guatemala	1:26:41 CR	José Raymundo Cox; Guatemala	1:30:34	Yassir Cabrera; Panama	1:33:40
35 km walk	Bernardo Barrondo; Guatemala	2:46:39 CR	José Leonidas Romero; Honduras	2:57:21	Luis Angel Sanzhez; Guatemala	3:05:44
High jump	Alexander Bowen; Panama	2.10 m CR	Jaime Escobar Valdivieso; Panama	2.06 m	Ken Franzua; Guatemala	2.01 m
Pole vault	Natán Rivera; El Salvador	5.05 m CR	Pedro Figueroa Flores; El Salvador	4.70 m	Christian Higueros; Guatemala	4.50 m
Long jump	Becker Jarquín; Nicaragua	7.32 m (wind: -0.5 m/s)	Angel Suárez Echevería; Nicaragua	7.19 m (wind: -1.1 m/s)	Jhamal Bowen; Panama	7.18 m (wind: -1.5 m/s)
Triple jump	Jason Castro; Honduras	15.80 m (wind: +0.7 m/s)	Brandon Terrel Jones; Belize	15.47 m (wind: -2.0 m/s)	Angel Suarez Echeverría; Nicaragua	15.36 m (wind: +0.4 m/s)
Shot put	Anselmo Delgado Ealy; Panama	15.25 m	Billy Lopez Aldana; Guatemala	15.07 m	Diego Alejandro Berrios; Guatemala	14.62 m
Discus throw	Winston Campbell; Honduras	50.82 m	Enrique Martinez Flores; El Salvador	45.03 m	Marlon Quemé; Guatemala	44.59 m
Hammer throw	Roberto Sawyers; Costa Rica	66.74 m CR	Diego Alejandro Berrios; Guatemala	63.21 m	Carlos Arteaga Carrión; Nicaragua	56.39 m
Javelin throw	Luis Taracena; Guatemala	71.78 m CR	Jonathan Javier Cedeño; Panama	66.29 m	Rowe Miranda; Panama	59.92 m
Decathlon	Ronald Ramirez Leiva; Guatemala	6475 pts	Darwin Simmons; Nicaragua	6021 pts	Youssef Qasem; Guatemala	5967 pts

=== Women ===
Event	Gold		Silver		Bronze	
100 m (wind: +0.9 m/s)	Irma Harris; Costa Rica	12.11	Rosa Baltazar; Guatemala	12.12	Rosa Mosquera; Panama	12.17
200 m (wind: -1.7 m/s)	Tracy Joseph Hamblin; Costa Rica	23.91	Samantha Dirks; Belize	24.86	Rosa Baltazar; Guatemala	25.12
400 m	Desire Bermúdez; Costa Rica	53.78 CR	Sharolyn Scott; Costa Rica	54.41	Ingrid Narváez; Nicaragua	56.86
800 m	Andrea Ferris; Panama	2:06.75	Daniela Rojas; Costa Rica	2:10.41	Monica Vargas; Costa Rica	2:10.68
1500 m	Andrea Ferris; Panama	4:23.69	Rolanda Bell; Panama	4:34.81	Viviana Aroche; Guatemala	4:36.71
5000 m	Evelyn Chávez; Guatemala	17:56.81	Merlin Chalí; Guatemala	18:35.09	Jenny Mendez Suanca; Costa Rica	18:46.50
10000 m	Merlín Chalí; Guatemala	38:05.80	Evelyn Chavez; Guatemala	38:08.34	Jenny Mendez Suanca; Costa Rica	39:33.17
100 m hurdles (wind: +1.2 m/s)	Andrea Vargas; Costa Rica	13.12 CR	Kaila Smith; Panama	14.48	Sarahi Álvarez; Nicaragua	15:13
400 m hurdles	Gianna Woodruff; Panama	57.85 CR	Sharolyn Scott; Costa Rica	58.52	Daniela Rojas; Costa Rica	1:00.49
3000 m steeplechase	Andrea Ferris; Panama	10:04.19 CR	Rolanda Bell; Panama	10:31.43	Brenda Salmerón; El Salvador	12:27.48
4 × 100 m relay	Costa Rica; Tracy Joseph Hamblin; Andrea Carolina Vargas; Maria Alejandra Murillo; Desire Bermúdez	46.35 CR	Panama; Gianna Woodruff; Rosa Mosquera; Kaila Smith; Nathalee Aranda	46.74	Belize; Faith Morris; Tricia Flores; Hilary Gladden; Samantha Dirks	47.44
4 × 400 m relay	Costa Rica; Irma Harris; Desire Bermúdez; Daniela Rojas; Sharolyn Scott	3:44.04 CR	Nicaragua; Asling Vasquez; Jarey Vasquez; Maria Carmona; Ingrid Narvaez	3:54.28	Belize; Samantha Dirks; Tricia Flores; Ashantie Carr; Ashontie Carr	4:01.32
Marathon	Jenny Mendez Suanca; Costa Rica	3:01:55	Yelka Centeno; Nicaragua	3:07:13	none awarded	
20 km walk	Mirna Ortiz; Guatemala	1:35:14 CR	Mayra Herrera; Guatemala	1:35:46	Maritza Poncio; Guatemala	1:38:00
High jump	Kashani Ríos; Panama	1.66 m	Ana María Mártinez; Panama	1.61 m	Ana Sofia Estrada; El Salvador	1.55 m
Pole vault	Ana Gabriela Granados; Nicaragua	2.80 m	Nataly Segura; Guatemala	2.45 m	shared silver	
Pole vault	Ana Gabriela Granados; Nicaragua	2.80 m	Aimee Zelaya; Honduras	2.45 m	shared silver	
Long jump	Nathalee Aranda; Panama	6.17 m CR (wind: -2.9 m/s)	Estefany Cruz; Guatemala	6.05 m (wind: +0.9 m/s)	Tricia Flores; Belize	5.70 m (wind: +1.1 m/s)
Triple jump	Estefany Cruz; Guatemala	13.25 m CR (wind: +0.4 m/s)	Thelma Fuentes; Guatemala	13.00 m (wind: -2.0 m/s)	Ana María Mártinez; Panama	12.30 m (wind: +0.4 m/s)
Shot put	Naomi Smith; Costa Rica	13.03 m	Aixa Middleton; Panama	13.02 m	Dalila Rugama; Nicaragua	12.89 m
Discus throw	Aixa Middleton; Panama	54.58 m CR	Doroty López; Guatemala	43.37 m	Alma Gutierrez Gale; Honduras	43.10 m
Hammer throw	Sonja Morano; Guatemala	51.55 m	Dagmar Alvarado; Panama	47.15 m	Viviana Abarca; Costa Rica	47.11 m
Javelin throw	Dalila Rugama; Nicaragua	53.47 m CR	Genova Arias; Costa Rica	45.82 m	Sofia Alonso Albrand; Guatemala	41.80 m
Heptathlon	Ana María Porras; Costa Rica	4920 pts CR	Katy Sealy; Belize	4690 pts	Jarey Vásquez; Nicaragua	4488 pts

== Medal table ==
* Host nation (Nicaragua)

Rank	Nation	Gold	Silver	Bronze	Total
1	Guatemala (GUA)	15	15	11	41
2	Costa Rica (CRC)	15	7	8	30
3	Panama (PAN)	10	9	7	26
4	Nicaragua (NIC)*	4	6	7	17
5	Honduras (HON)	2	4	1	7
6	El Salvador (ESA)	1	3	8	12
7	Belize (BIZ)	0	4	3	7
Totals (7 entries)		47	48	45	140

== Participation ==
A total of 194 athletes (108 men and 86 women) from 7 countries were reported to participate:

- Belize (14)
- Costa Rica (30)
- El Salvador (32)
- Guatemala (40)
- Honduras (11)
- Nicaragua (40)
- (Panama) Panamá (27)
