= Athletics at the 2023 Pan American Games – Men's 400 metres hurdles =

Men's 400 metres hurdles at the 2023 Pan American Games
- Venue: Athletics Stadium
- Dates: November 1 – November 3
- Competitors: 15 from 11 nations
- Winning time: 49.19

Medalists
Gold medal	Jaheel Hyde	Jamaica
Silver medal	Matheus Lima	Brazil
Bronze medal	Yoao Illas	Cuba

The men's 400 metres hurdles competition of the athletics events at the 2023 Pan American Games was held on November 1 and 3 at the Julio Martínez National Stadium of Santiago, Chile.

== Records ==
Prior to this competition, the existing world and Pan American Games records were as follows:

World record	Karsten Warholm (NOR)	45.94	Tokyo, Japan	August 3, 2021
Pan American Games record	Omar Cisneros (CUB)	47.99	Guadalajara, Mexico	October 27, 2011

== Schedule ==
Date	Time	Round
November 1, 2023	18:25	Semifinal
November 3, 2023	17:45	Final

== Results ==
=== Semifinal ===
Qualification: First 3 in each heat (Q) and next 2 fastest (q) qualified for the final. The results were as follows:

==== Heat 1 ====
Rank	Lane	Athlete	Nation	Time	Notes
1	6	Jaheel Hyde	Jamaica	49.72	Q
2	3	Guillhermo Campos	Mexico	50.82	Q
3	5	Márcio Teles	Brazil	51.20	Q
4	2	Pablo Andrés Ibáñez	El Salvador	51.52	
5	7	Cristóbal Muñoz	Chile	51.57	
6	4	Juander Santos	Dominican Republic	52.64	
–	8	Christopher Robinson	United States	DNS	

==== Heat 2 ====
Rank	Lane	Athlete	Nation	Time	Notes
1	2	Matheus Lima	Brazil	49.94	Q
2	3	Yoao Illas	Cuba	50.05	Q
3	4	Yeral Núñez	Dominican Republic	51.27	Q
4	6	Bruno de Genaro	Argentina	51.40	q
5	8	James Smith II	United States	51.42	q
6	5	Malique Smith	Virgin Islands	51.47	
7	1	Alfredo Sepúlveda	Chile	52.34	
–	7	Gerald Drummond	Costa Rica	DQ	TR22.6.1

=== Final ===
The results were as follows:

Rank	Lane	Name	Nationality	Time	Notes
1st place, gold medalist(s)	4	Jaheel Hyde	Jamaica	49.19	
2nd place, silver medalist(s)	6	Matheus Lima	Brazil	49.69	
3rd place, bronze medalist(s)	7	Yoao Illas	Cuba	49.74	PB
4	8	Yeral Núñez	Dominican Republic	49.89	
5	2	James Smith II	United States	50.02	
6	5	Guillermo Campos	Mexico	50.10	
7	3	Márcio Teles	Brazil	50.80	
8	1	Bruno de Genaro	Argentina	1:15.82	
