= 2018 Ibero-American Championships in Athletics =

XVIII Ibero-American Championships in Athletics
- Dates: August 24–26
- Host city: Trujillo, Peru
- Venue: Estadio Chan Chan
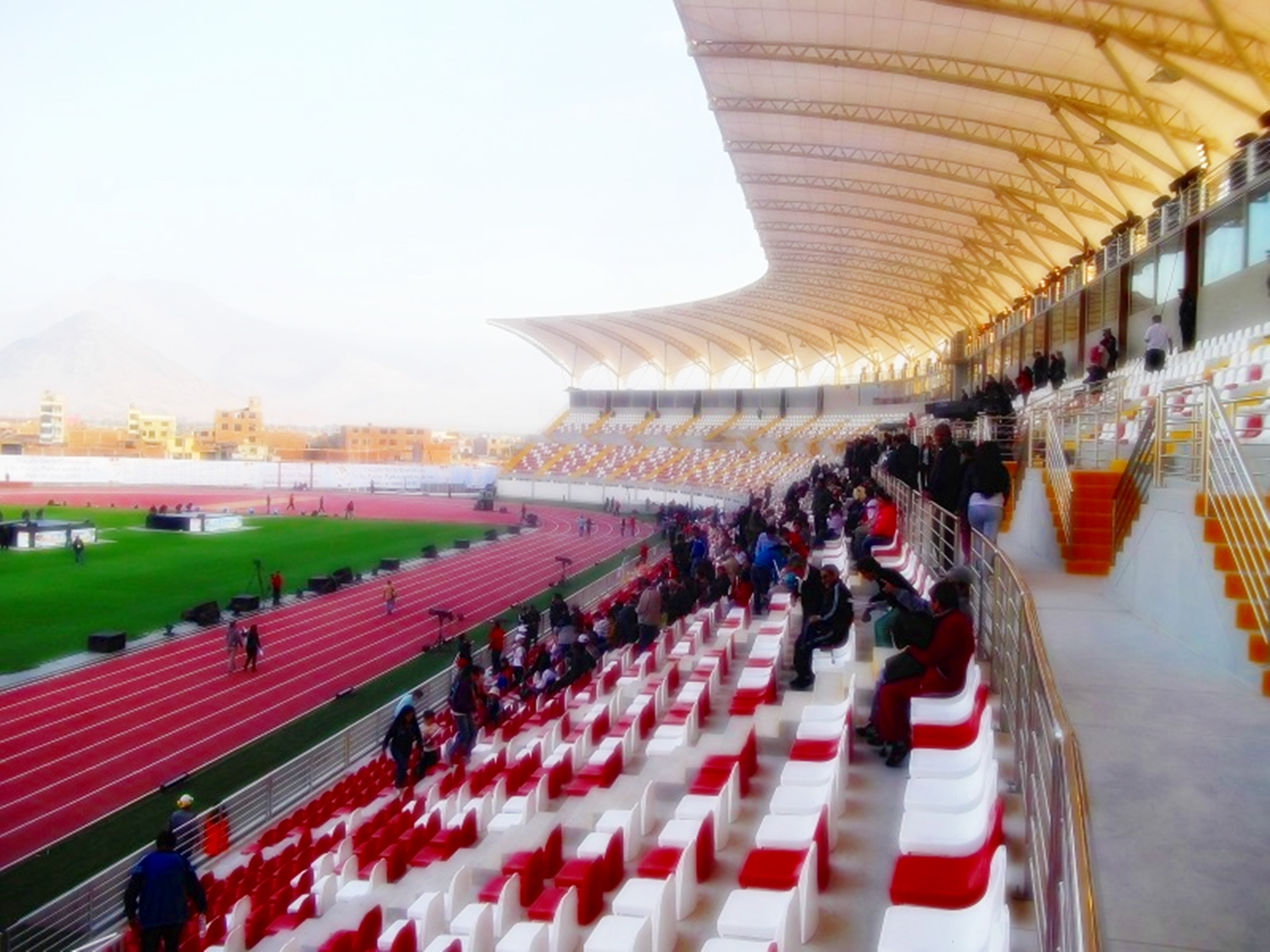
- Level: Senior
- Events: 44 (22 men, 22 women)
- Participation: 262 athletes from 17 nations

The 18th Ibero-American Championships in Athletics were held at the Estadio Chan Chan in Trujillo, Peru, between August 24–26, 2018. A total of 44 events were contested, 22 by men and 22 by women.

== Medal summary ==
=== Men ===
Event	Gold		Silver		Bronze	
100 metres (wind: +0.7 m/s)	Paulo André de Oliveira; Brazil	10.27	Jorge Vides; Brazil	10.27	Reynier Mena; Cuba	10.47
200 metres (wind: +0.1 m/s)	Jorge Vides; Brazil	20.34	Aldemir da Silva Júnior; Brazil	20.42	Nery Brenes; Costa Rica	20.88
400 metres	Lucas Carvalho; Brazil	45.92	Nery Brenes; Costa Rica	46.27	Ricardo dos Santos; Portugal	46.45
800 metres	Thiago André; Brazil	1:46.73	Andrés Arroyo; Puerto Rico	1:47.62	Alejandro Peirano; Chile	1:48.62
1500 metres	Llorenç Sales; Spain	3:48.27	Thiago André; Brazil	3:48.48	Alfredo Santana; Puerto Rico	3:49.50
3000 metres	Altobeli da Silva; Brazil	7:57.52	Alfredo Santana; Puerto Rico	8:01.20	José Luis Rojas; Peru	8:04.00
5000 metres	José Luis Rojas; Peru	13:42.38	Juan Antonio Pérez; Spain	13:48.02	Luis Ostos; Peru	13:48.57
110 metres hurdles (wind: –0.2 m/s)	Gabriel Constantino; Brazil	13.61	Javier McFarlane; Peru	14.04	Agustín Carrera; Argentina	14.16
400 metres hurdles	Márcio Teles; Brazil	49.64	Gerald Drummond; Costa Rica	49.80	Leandro Zamora; Cuba	49.85
3000 metres steeplechase	Altobeli da Silva; Brazil	8:35.57	Daniel Arce; Spain	8:36.33	Yuri Labra; Peru	8:41.29
4 x 100 metres relay	Brazil; Gabriel Constantino; Jorge Vides; Aldemir da Silva Júnior; Paulo André de Oliveira	38.78	Paraguay; Fredy Maidana; Christopher Ortiz; Giovanni Díaz; Nilo Duré	39.99 NR	Peru; Fabricio Mautino; Andy Martínez; Luis Iriarte; Fabricio Vizcarra	40.69
4 x 400 metres relay	Chile; Enzo Faulbaum; Alejandro Peirano; Rafael Muñoz; Alfredo Sepúlveda	3:10.77	Ecuador; Carlos Perlaza; Ian Corozo; Emerson Alejandro Chala; David Cetre	3:11.73	Peru; Luis Iriarte; Pierre Lizarazburu; Marco Vilca; Paulo César Herrera	3:15.59
20,000 metres track walk	Mauricio Arteaga; Ecuador	1:22:18.16 WL	César Rodríguez; Peru	1:23:22.96 NR	Juan Manuel Cano; Argentina	1:24:07.00
High jump	Carlos Layoy; Argentina	2.21 m	Talles Silva; Brazil	2.21 m	Fernando Ferreira; Brazil	2.10 m
Pole vault	Augusto Dutra de Oliveira; Brazil	5.40 m	Germán Chiaraviglio; Argentina	5.20 m	Didac Salas; Spain	5.10 m
Long jump	José Luis Mandros; Peru	7.87 m +0.0 m/s	Daniel Pineda; Chile	7.81 m +1.1 m/s	Emiliano Lasa; Uruguay	7.79 m +0.2 m/s
Triple jump	Cristian Nápoles; Cuba	16.81 m +0.9 m/s	Pablo Torrijos; Spain	16.74 +1.9 m/s	Alexsandro de Melo; Brazil	15.94 m +0.0 m/s
Shot put	Darlan Romani; Brazil	20.74 m IR	Tsanko Arnaudov; Portugal	19.34 m	Eduardo Espín; Ecuador	16.13 m
Discus throw	Mauricio Ortega; Colombia	60.49 m	Juan José Caicedo; Ecuador	58.68 m	Douglas dos Reis; Brazil	56.91 m
Hammer throw	Javier Cienfuegos; Spain	74.71 m	Joaquín Gómez; Argentina	74.64 m	Roberto Sawyers; Costa Rica	73.16 m
Javelin throw	Arley Ibargüen; Colombia	75.50 m	Francisco Muse; Chile	73.10 m	Giovanni Díaz; Paraguay	71.11 m
Decathlon	Felipe dos Santos; Brazil	7,663	Sergio Pandiani; Argentina	7,293	Miguel Monsalve; Peru	5,785

=== Women ===
Event	Gold		Silver		Bronze	
100 metres (wind: +1.1 m/s)	Vitória Cristina Rosa; Brazil	11.33	Ángela Tenorio; Ecuador	11.36	Rosângela Santos; Brazil	11.44
200 metres (wind: +0.3 m/s)	Vitória Cristina Rosa; Brazil	22.90	Rosângela Santos; Brazil	23.92	Gabriela Suárez; Ecuador	24.07
400 metres	Cátia Azevedo; Portugal	52.26	Geisa Coutinho; Brazil	52.57	Laura Bueno; Spain	52.8
800 metres	Esther Guerrero; Spain	2:04.55	Déborah Rodríguez; Uruguay	2:06.19	Natalia Romero; Spain	2:06.54
1500 metres	Solange Pereira; Spain	4:18.31	María Pía Fernández; Uruguay	4:18.65	Mariana Borelli; Argentina	4:20.74
3000 metres	María Pía Fernández; Uruguay	9:16.16	Tatiane da Silva; Brazil	9:18.39	Florencia Borelli; Argentina	9:19.09
5000 metres	Luz Mery Rojas; Peru	16:08.77	Saida Meneses; Peru	16:09.75	Nuria Lugeros; Spain	16:22.71
100 metres hurdles (wind: –0.2 m/s)	Andrea Vargas; Costa Rica	13.04	Maribel Caicedo; Ecuador	13.63	Rayane Santos; Brazil	13.68
400 metres hurdles	Fiorella Chiappe; Argentina	56.25	Daniela Rojas; Costa Rica	57.53	Valeria Cabezas; Colombia	57.74
3000 metres steeplechase	Tatiane da Silva; Brazil	9:48.40	María José Pérez; Spain	9:55.63	Belén Casetta; Argentina	10:07.20
4 x 100 metres relay	Peru; Gabriela Delgado; Triana Alonso; Diana Bazalar; Paola Mautino	46.76	Ecuador; Maribel Caicedo; Ángela Tenorio; Gabriela Suárez; Marina Poroso	46.94	Bolivia; Alinny Delgadillo; Guadalupe Torrez; Danitza Avila; Valeria Quispe	47.39
4 x 400 metres relay	Portugal; Rivinilda Mentai; Joceline Monteiro; Cátia Azevedo; Dorothé Évora	3:36.49	Argentina; María Ayelén Diogo; Valeria Barón; Noelia Martínez; Fiorella Chiappe	3:36.99	Spain; Natalia Romero; Solange Pereira; Esther Guerrero; Laura Bueno	3:38.32
10,000 metres track walk	Sandra Arenas; Colombia	42:02.99; CR, AR, WL	Kimberly García; Peru	42:56.97 NR	Glenda Morejón; Ecuador	44:12.75 NR
High jump	María Fernanda Murillo; Colombia	1.84 m	Lorena Aires; Uruguay	1.81 m	Candy Toche; Peru	1.70 m
Pole vault	Juliana Campos; Brazil	4.40 m	Maialen Axpe; Spain	4.20 m	Katherine Castillo; Colombia	4.20 m
Long jump	Juliet Itoya; Spain	6.73 m +4.5 m/s	Eliane Martins; Brazil	6.66 m +4.9 m/s	Fátima Diame; Spain	6.51 m +3.8 m/s
Triple jump	Yosiris Urrutia; Colombia	14.14 m +2.4 m/s	Susana Cortez; Portugal	13.76 m +0.8 m/s	Silvana Segura; Peru	13.46 m +0.2 m/s
Shot put	Geisa Arcanjo; Brazil	18.10 m	Keely Medeiros; Brazil	16.64 m	Ivanna Gallardo; Chile	15.05 m
Discus throw	Andressa de Morais; Brazil	62.02 m	Fernanda Martins; Brazil	60.14 m	Irina Rodrigues; Portugal	58.86 m
Hammer throw	Jennifer Dahlgren; Argentina	68.89 m	Rosa Rodríguez; Venezuela	67.93 m	Berta Castells; Spain	66.68 m
Javelin throw	María Lucelly Murillo; Colombia	59.51 m	Arantza Moreno; Spain	59.37 m	Laila Domingos; Brazil	58.24 m
Heptathlon	Ana Camila Pirelli; Paraguay	5,879	Luisarys Toledo; Venezuela	5,791	Only two finishers	

== Medal table ==
The host country is highlighted in lavender blue

Rank	Nation	Gold	Silver	Bronze	Total
1	Brazil (BRA)	18	10	6	34
2	Colombia (COL)	6	0	2	8
3	Spain (ESP)	5	6	7	18
4	Peru (PER)*	4	4	8	16
5	Argentina (ARG)	3	4	5	12
6	Portugal (POR)	2	2	2	6
7	Ecuador (ECU)	1	5	3	9
8	Costa Rica (CRC)	1	3	2	6
9	Uruguay (URU)	1	3	1	5
10	Chile (CHI)	1	2	2	5
11	Paraguay (PAR)	1	1	1	3
12	Cuba (CUB)	1	0	2	3
13	Puerto Rico (PUR)	0	2	1	3
14	Venezuela (VEN)	0	2	0	2
15	Bolivia (BOL)	0	0	1	1
Totals (15 entries)		44	44	43	131

== Participating nations ==
A total of 262 athletes from 17 countries participated.

- Argentina (18)
- Bolivia (12)
- Brazil (29)
- Chile (18)
- Colombia (14)
- Costa Rica (7)
- Cuba (5)
- Ecuador (50)
- Nicaragua (1)
- Paraguay (8)
- Peru (45)
- Portugal (9)
- Puerto Rico (10)
- El Salvador (5)
- Spain (24)
- Uruguay (5)
- Venezuela (2)
