= Ian Sancho =

Costa Rican judoka (born 1992)

Personal information
- Full name: Ian Sancho Chinchila
- Nationality: Costa Rica
- Born: 5 September 1992 (age 33)
- Occupation: Judoka

Sport
- Sport: Judo
- Weight class: –66 kg

Profile at external databases
- IJF: 5224
- JudoInside.com: 61899
- Updated on 31 October 2021

Ian Sancho Chincila (born 5 September 1992) is a Costa Rican judoka. He competed in the 2020 Summer Olympics in the men's -66 kg event and was placed 9th.

His father Andrés had also represented Costa Rica in judo at the 1984 Summer Olympics.

Olympic Games
Preceded by Nery Brenes	Flag bearer for Costa Rica; Tokyo 2020 with Andrea Vargas	Succeeded by Gerald Drummond; Milagro Mena
