= List of Salvadoran records in athletics =

The following are the national records in athletics in El Salvador maintained by El Salvador's national athletics federation: Federación Salvadoreña de Atletismo (FSA).

== Outdoor ==
Key to tables: Awaiting ratification Record not kept by FSA Not ratified or later rescinded by FSA

=== Men ===
Event	Record	Athlete	Date	Meet	Place	Ref.
60 m	6.76 NWI	José Andrés Salazar	9 February 2019		San Salvador, El Salvador	
100 m	10.35 (+1.5 m/s)	Rubén Benitez	23 April 1998		Fullerton, United States	
150 m	15.89 (+1.8 m/s)	José Andrés Salazar	1 February 2020		San Salvador, El Salvador	
200 m	21.05 (±0.0 m/s)	Rubén Benitez	16 May 1998		Los Angeles, United States	
300 m	33.73	Pablo Andrés Ibáñez	29 February 2020		San Salvador, El Salvador	
400 m	45.99 A	Takeshi Fujiwara	28 April 2012	Grand Prix Ximena Restrepo	Medellín, Colombia	
500 m	1:01.71	Pablo Andrés Ibáñez	6 March 2022		San Salvador, El Salvador	
600 m	1:17.29	Pablo Andrés Ibáñez	14 March 2021		San Salvador, El Salvador	
800 m	1:50.85	Pablo Andrés Ibáñez	26 June 2022	Salvadorian Championships	San Salvador, El Salvador	
1000 m	2:29.33	Aarón Hernández	5 March 2022		San Salvador, El Salvador	
1000 m	2:28.0 h	Pablo Andrés Ibáñez	19 March 2022		San Salvador, El Salvador	
1500 m	3:52.12	Aarón Hernández	6 July 2023	Central American and Caribbean Games	San Salvador, El Salvador	
Mile	4:20.11	Pablo Andres Ibañez	29 February 2020		San Salvador, El Salvador	
2000 m	5:36.0	Ronald Arias	5 June 2001		San Salvador, El Salvador	
3000 m	8:43.46	Cesar Peraza	1 February 2000		San Salvador, El Salvador	
5000 m	14:38.37	Ronald Arias	27 May 2001		Havana, Cuba	
5 km (road)	16:15+	Oscar Aldana	17 October 2020	World Half Marathon Championships	Gdynia, Poland	
8000 m	25:57.6	William Salinas	12 April 2003		San Salvador, El Salvador	
10,000 m	30:27.96	Ronald Arias	25 May 2001		Havana, Cuba	
10 km (road)	32:30+	Oscar Aldana	17 October 2020	World Half Marathon Championships	Gdynia, Poland	
15 km (road)	48:55+	Oscar Aldana	17 October 2020	World Half Marathon Championships	Gdynia, Poland	
20 km (road)	1:05:13+	Oscar Aldana	17 October 2020	World Half Marathon Championships	Gdynia, Poland	
Half marathon	1:08:31	Oscar Aldana	17 October 2020	World Half Marathon Championships	Gdynia, Poland	
Marathon	2:26:57	Víctor Vasquez	13 January 1990		Tegucigalpa, Honduras	
Marathon	2:24:27	Jorge Maravilla	17 April 2017	Boston Marathon	Boston, United States	
60 m hurdles	8.48 NWI	Renán Palma	2 March 2019		San Salvador, El Salvador	
110 m hurdles	14.19 (+1.8 m/s)	Renán Palma	27 October 2011	Pan American Games	Guadalajara, Mexico	
300 m hurdles	36.88	Pablo Andrés Ibáñez	12 March 2023	Torneo No Olímpico	San Salvador, El Salvador	
400 m hurdles	48.56	Pablo Andrés Ibáñez	6 May 2023	Central American Championships	San José, Costa Rica	
2000 m steeplechase	6:15.65	Cesar Peraza	14 March 2021		San Salvador, El Salvador	
3000 m steeplechase	8:53.90	Carlos Santos	15 May 2021	IC4A/ECAC Championships	Springfield, United States	
High jump	2.11 m	Marlon Colorado	29 July 2011		Barquisimeto, Venezuela	
Pole vault	5.35 m	Natán Rivera	28 March 2019	Texas Relays	Austin, United States	
Long jump	7.59 m	Angelo Iannuzzelli	26 March 1992		Huixquilucan, Mexico	
Triple jump	14.93 m A (−0.5 m/s)	Fernando Reyes	29 April 2023		León, Mexico	
Shot put	17.45 m	Carlos Aviles	1 May 2021	Ohio State Jesse Owens Invitational	Columbus, United States	
Discus throw	55.54 m	Herbert Rodriguez	28 July 1991		Inglewood, United States	
Hammer throw	61.13 m	Enrique Martinez	7 April 2018		Canyon, United States	
Javelin throw	72.70 m	Fernando Palomo	19 August 1998	Central American and Caribbean Games	Maracaibo, Venezuela	
Decathlon	7517 pts	Santiago Mellado	28–29 September 1988	Olympic Games	Seoul, South Korea	
Decathlon	100m (wind) / Long jump (wind) / Shot put / High jump / 400m / 110m H (wind) / Discus / Pole vault / Javelin / 1500m; 11.33 / 6.83 m / 11.63 m / 2.06 m / 48.37 / 15.39 / 37.52 m / 4.60 m / 55.42 m / 4:30.07					
20,000 m walk (track)	1:25:19.91	Walter Sandoval	12 June 2009	Central American Championships	Guatemala City, Guatemala	
20 km walk (road)	1:25:23	Walter Sandoval	2 June 2007		A Coruña, Spain	
35 km walk (road)	2:37:11	Emerson Hernández	6 February 2011		San Salvador, El Salvador	
50 km walk (road)	3:53:57	Emerson Hernández	11 August 2012	Olympic Games	London, United Kingdom	
4 × 100 m relay	40.30	El Salvador; Juan Carlos Rodríguez; Pablo Andrés Ibáñez; Estebán Ibáñez; José Andrés Salazar	20 October 2025	Central American Games	Quetzaltenango, Guatemala	
4 × 400 m relay	3:12.37	El Salvador; Joseph Alejandro Hernandez; Esteban Ibáñez; Samuel José Ibáñez; Pablo Andrés Ibáñez	16 April 2023		San Salvador, El Salvador	

=== Women ===
Event	Record	Athlete	Date	Meet	Place	Ref.
60 m	7.81 (+0.6 m/s)	Nancy Sandoval	11 February 2023		San Salvador, El Salvador	
60 m	7.79 NWI	Adriana Andrade	9 February 2019		San Salvador, El Salvador	
100 m	12.08 A	Leticia Sorto	30 May 1998		Mexico City, Mexico	
150 m	18.79	Verónica Quijano	19 February 2005		San Salvador, El Salvador	
200 m	24.91	Verónica Quijano	21 October 2001		San Salvador, El Salvador	
300 m	39.8 h	Verónica Quijano	28 April 2001		San Salvador, El Salvador	
400 m	54.72	Verónica Quijano	29 November 2001	Central American and Caribbean Championships	Guatemala City, Guatemala	
500 m	1:25.66	Brenda Salmeron	20 February 2021		San Salvador, El Salvador	
600 m	1:33.7	Verónica Quijano	29 April 2001		San Salvador, El Salvador	
800 m	2:07.87	Gladys Landaverde	15 June 2012	Central American Championships	Managua, Nicaragua	
1000 m	2:58.65	Brenda Salmeron	18 March 2006		San Salvador, El Salvador	
1500 m	4:18.26	Gladys Landaverde	6 August 2012	Olympic Games	London, United Kingdom	
Mile	5:08.13	Brenda Salmeron	22 February 2009		San Salvador, El Salvador	
2000 m	6:33.29	Ana Hercules	22 September 2013		San Salvador, El Salvador	
3000 m	9:42.28	Kriscia Lorena Garcia	8 August 1984		Los Angeles, United States	
5000 m	16:37.88	Elizabeth Guerrini	22 April 2004	Drake Relays	Des Moines, United States	
8000 m	29:44.99	Idelma Delgado	14 March 2021		San Salvador, El Salvador	
10,000 m	36:08.05	Debora Leonor Magaña	22 May 1997		Edwardsville, United States	
Half marathon	1:17:48	Elizabeth Guerrini	12 October 2003		Long Beach, United States	
Marathon	2:49:34	Kriscia Lorena Garcia	15 May 1988		San Salvador, El Salvador	
60 m hurdles	8.72 NWI	Nancy Sandoval	10 February 2019		San Salvador, El Salvador	
100 m hurdles	13.61 (+0.7 m/s)	Nancy Sandoval	19 October 2025	Central American Games	Quetzaltenango, Guatemala	
300 m hurdles	44.03	Verónica Quijano	20 June 1997		Guatemala	
400 m hurdles	58.29	Verónica Quijano	5 December 2002	Central American and Caribbean Games	San Salvador, El Salvador	
3000 m steeplechase	10:38.25	Zuna Portillo	21 April 2012	LSU Alumni Gold	Baton Rouge, United States	
High jump	1.74 m	María Gabriela Carrillo	17 March 2007		San Salvador, El Salvador	
High jump	1.74 m	Ana Gonzalez	26 June 2021	Central American Championships	San José, Costa Rica	
Pole vault	4.00 m A	Andrea Velasco	3 June 2022		Morelia, Mexico	
Long jump	6.04 m	María Gabriela Carrillo	18 March 2006		San Salvador, El Salvador	
Triple jump	12.81 m	María Gabriela Carrillo	9 April 2006		San Salvador, El Salvador	
Shot put	14.60 m	Eva María Dimas	18 March 2006		San Salvador, El Salvador	
Discus throw	47.45 m	Eva María Dimas	30 November 2001	Central American and Caribbean Championships	Guatemala City, Guatemala	
Hammer throw	62.43 m	Nancy Guillén	9 June 2001		San Salvador, El Salvador	
Javelin throw	44.05 m	Karen Villafuerte	1 December 2001	Central American Games	Guatemala City, Guatemala	
Heptathlon	5137 pts	Ana González-Velásquez	11–12 April 2025	44 Farms Team Invitational	College Station, United States	
Heptathlon	100m H (wind) / High jump / Shot put / 200m (wind) / Long jump (wind) / Javelin / 800m; 14.31 (+0.2 m/s) / 1.71 m / 9.63 m / 25.56 (−0.1 m/s) / 5.65 m (+2.7 m/s) / 28.77 m / 2:21.99					
10,000 m walk (track)	44:16.21	Cristina López	13 July 2007		San Salvador, El Salvador	
10 km walk (road)	45:28+	Cristina López	4 June 2005		A Coruña, Spain	
20 km walk (road)	1:30:08	Cristina López	4 June 2005		A Coruña, Spain	
4 × 100 m relay	46.93	El Salvador; Marcela Navarro; Verónica Quijano; Karla Hernández; Aura Amaya	1 December 2001	Central American Games	Guatemala City, Guatemala	
4 × 400 m relay	3:48.24	El Salvador; Verónica Quijano; Karla Hernández; Ana Gabriela Quezada; Amanda Martinez	6 December 2002	Central American and Caribbean Games	San Salvador, El Salvador	

=== Mixed ===
Event	Record	Athlete	Date	Meet	Place	Ref.
4 × 400 m relay	3:36.99	El Salvador; José Navas; Nathalie Almandarez; Samuel Ibañez; Yency Chamur	3 July 2023	Central American and Caribbean Games	San Salvador, El Salvador	

== Indoor ==
=== Men ===
Event	Record	Athlete	Date	Meet	Place	Ref.
60 m	7.03	Juan Rodriguez	3 March 2018	World Championships	Birmingham, United Kingdom	
200 m	22.25	Jason Alvarez	23 January 2026	Dr. Sander Scorcher	New York City, United States	
300 m	37.19	José Navas	4 February 2023	Harry Jerome Classic	Richmond, British Columbia, Canada	
400 m	48.21	Takeshi Fujiwara	12 March 2010	World Championships	Doha, Qatar	
500 m	1:04.39	Julio Canales	23 January 2026	BU Bruce Lehane Scarlet and White Invitational	Boston, United States	
800 m	1:53.53	George Erazo	28 February 2020	Fastrack Last Chance	Staten Island, United States	
1000 m	2:27.47	Jon Diaz Querejeta	16 January 2026	NYC Gotham Cup	Staten Island, United States	
1500 m						
Mile	4:16.77	Carlos Santos Jr.	5 February 2022	BU Bruce Lehane Scarlet and White Invitational	Boston, United States	
3000 m	8:06.30	Carlos Santos Jr.	10 February 2023	Fastrack National Invitational	Staten Island, United States	
5000 m	14:05.86	Carlos Santos Jr.	27 January 2023	Dr. Sander Invitational Columbia Challenge	New York City, United States	
55 m hurdles	7.46	Renán Palma	5 February 2011	Wichita State Quad	Wichita, United States	
60 m hurdles	8.00	Victor Steiner	3 February 2023	Crimson Elite	Cambridge, United States	
High jump						
Pole vault	5.20 m	Natan Rivera	26 January 2019		Houston, United States	
Long jump	7.10 m	Victor Steiner	3 February 2023	Crimson Elite	Cambridge, United States	
Triple jump	13.74 m	Mauricio Carranza	6 March 1987	World Championships	Indianapolis, United States	
Shot put	18.74 m	Carlos Aviles	25 February 2022	Big Ten Championships	Geneva, United States	
Weight throw	18.39 m	Enrique Martinez	21 February 2020	IC4A/ECAC Championships	Boston, United States	
Heptathlon						
Heptathlon	60m / Long jump / Shot put / High jump / 60m H / Pole vault / 1000m					
5000 m walk						
4 × 400 m relay						

=== Women ===
Event	Record	Athlete	Date	Meet	Place	Ref.
60 m	7.63	Lauren Maria Velasquez Smith	28 February 2016		Boston, United States	
200 m	25.05	Lauren Maria Velasquez Smith	28 February 2016		Boston, United States	
400 m	59.58	Sofia Carias	25 February 2017		Indianapolis, United States	
800 m	2:20.47	Rosa Evora	10 March 1995	World Championships	Barcelona, Spain	
1500 m						
3000 m						
60 m hurdles	8.85	Laura Valldeperas	6 February 2004		Bloomington, United States	
High jump	1.72 m (Note: record set during pentathlon competition)	Ana González	11 March 2023	New Balance Nationals	Boston, United States	
Pole vault	3.66 m	Michele Rivera	23 February 2002		Los Angeles, United States	
Long jump	5.91 m	Laura Valldeperas	14 February 2004		Findlay, United States	
Triple jump	11.94 m	Rebeca Barrientos	4 February 2023	BU Scarlet and White Invite	Boston, United States	
Shot put	10.28 m	Laura Valldeperas	28 February 2003		Houston, United States	
Weight throw	18.39 m A	Nancy guillen	22 February 2002		Reno, United States	
Pentathlon	3471 pts	Ana González	26 February 2024	Southland Conference Championships	Birmingham, United States	
Pentathlon	60m H / High jump / Shot put / Long jump / 800m; 9.38 / 1.65 m / 9.14 m / 5.19 m / 2.27.84					
3000 m walk						
4 × 400 m relay						
