= Pablo Andrés Ibáñez =

Salvadoran hurdler (born 1998)

Personal information
- Full name: Pablo Andrés Ibáñez Guevara
- Born: 28 October 1998 (age 28)

Sport
- Sport: Athletics
- Event: 400 metres hurdles

Pablo Andrés Ibáñez (born 28 October 1998) is a Salvadoran athlete specialising in the 400 metres hurdles. He represented his country at the 2017, 2022 and 2023 World Championships without advancing from the heats.

== International competitions ==
Year	Competition	Venue	Position	Event	Notes
Representing El Salvador
2014	Central American Youth Championships	Managua, Nicaragua	1st	400 m hurdles (84 cm)	55.57
2014	Central American Youth Championships	Managua, Nicaragua	3rd	4 × 100 m relay	44.83
2014	Central American Youth Championships	Managua, Nicaragua	3rd	Medley relay	2:01.73
2014	Central American Championships	Tegucigalpa, Honduras	8th	400 m hurdles	58.00
2014	Central American Championships	Tegucigalpa, Honduras	6th	Triple jump	13.19 m
2015	Central American Youth Championships	San Salvador, El Salvador	3rd	110 m hurdles (91.4 cm)	15.19
2015	Central American Youth Championships	San Salvador, El Salvador	1st	400 m hurdles (84 cm)	53.26
2015	World Youth Championships	Cali, Colombia	15th (h)	400 m hurdles (84 cm)	52.56
2016	Central American Junior Championships	San José, Costa Rica	5th	400 m	50.12
2016	Central American Junior Championships	San José, Costa Rica	2nd	400 m hurdles	54.07
2016	Central American Championships	San Salvador, El Salvador	5th	400 m hurdles	53.38
2016	World U20 Championships	Bydgoszcz, Poland	40th (h)	400 m hurdles	54.56
2017	Central American Championships	Tegucigalpa, Honduras	3rd	400 m hurdles	52.81
2017	Pan American U20 Championships	Trujillo, Peru	6th	400 m hurdles	51.29
2017	World Championships	London, United Kingdom	36th (h)	400 m hurdles	52.72
2017	Central American Games	Managua, Nicaragua	2nd	400 m hurdles	50.82
2017	Central American Games	Managua, Nicaragua	3rd	4 × 400 m relay	3:20.44
2018	Central American Championships	Guatemala City, Guatemala	3rd	400 m hurdles	51.25
2018	Central American and Caribbean Games	Barranquilla, Colombia	7th	400 m hurdles	49.96
2018	NACAC Championships	Toronto, Canada	9th (h)	400 m hurdles	50.50
2018	Ibero-American Championships	Trujillo, Peru	7th	400 m hurdles	50.92
2019	Central American Championships	Managua, Nicaragua	3rd	400 m hurdles	50.96
2019	Central American Championships	Managua, Nicaragua	2nd	4 × 400 m relay	3:17.98
2019	NACAC U23 Championships	Querétaro City, Mexico	3rd	400 m hurdles	50.96
2019	Pan American Games	Lima, Peru	10th (h)	400 m hurdles	50.70
2022	World Championships	Eugene, United States	25th (h)	400 m hurdles	50.18
2023	Central American and Caribbean Games	San Salvador, El Salvador	1st	400 m hurdles	49.34
2023	Central American and Caribbean Games	San Salvador, El Salvador	6th	4 × 100 m relay	41.29
2023	Central American and Caribbean Games	San Salvador, El Salvador	6th	4 × 400 m relay	3:11.71
2023	Central American Championships	San José, Costa Rica	2nd	400 m hurdles	48.56 NR
2023	Central American Championships	San José, Costa Rica	1st	4 × 100 m relay	41.07
2023	World Championships	Budapest, Hungary	32nd (h)	400 m hurdles	50.01
2023	Pan American Games	Santiago, Chile	10th (h)	400 m hurdles	51.52
2024	Ibero-American Championships	Cuiabá, Brazil	4th	400 m hurdles	49.65
2025	Central American Championships	Managua, Nicaragua	2nd	400 m hurdles	49.91
2025	NACAC Championships	Freeport, Bahamas	8th	400 m hurdles	50.11
2025	Central American Games	Quetzaltenango, Guatemala	1st	400 m	46.90
2025	Central American Games	Quetzaltenango, Guatemala	1st	4 × 100 m relay	40.30
2025	Central American Games	Quetzaltenango, Guatemala	2nd	4 × 400 m relay	3:16.03
2026	Ibero-American Championships	Lima, Peru	4th	400 m hurdles	50.74
2026	Central American Championships	Managua, Nicaragua	1st	400 m hurdles	50.05
2026	Central American Championships	Managua, Nicaragua	1st	4 × 400 m relay	3:12.89
2026	Pan American Championships	Medellín, Colombia	5th	400 m hurdles	49.53
2026	Central American and Caribbean Games	Santo Domingo, Dominican Republic	2nd	400 m hurdles	49.64
2026	Central American and Caribbean Games	Santo Domingo, Dominican Republic	7th	4 × 400 m relay	3:12.50

== Personal bests ==
Outdoor

- 400 metres – 46.57 (Oordegem 2023)
- 800 metres – 1:50.85 (San Salvador 2022) NR
- 400 metres hurdles – 48.56 (San José 2023) NR
