= Athletics at the 2013 Central American Games =

Athletics at the X Central American Games
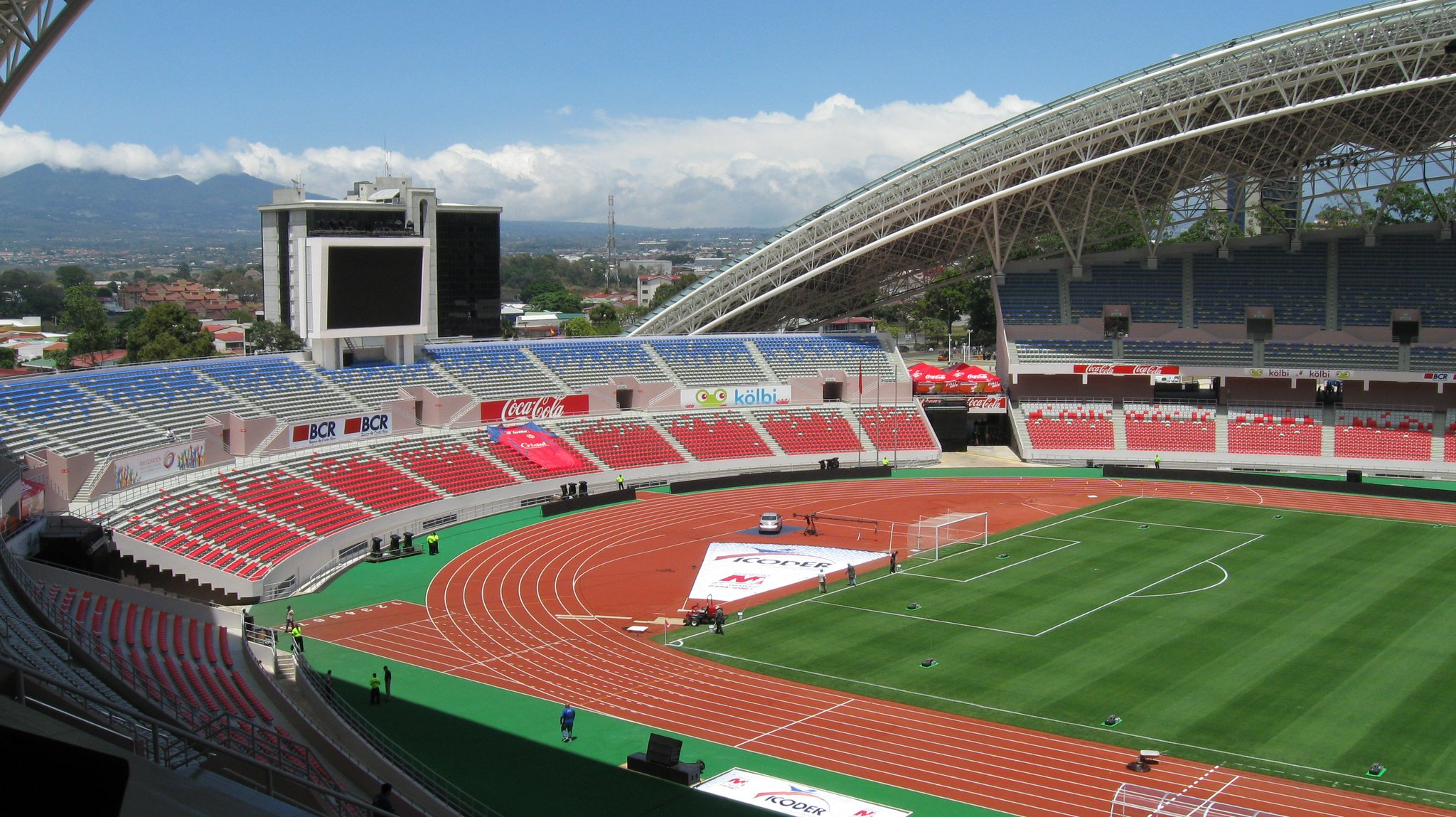
- Dates: March 9–12, 17
- Host city: San José, Costa Rica
- Venue: Estadio Nacional
- Level: Senior
- Events: 41 (20 men, 21 women)
- Participation: 175 (100 men, 75 women) athletes from 7 nations
- Records set: 13

Athletics competitions at the 2013 Central American Games were held at the Estadio Nacional in San José, Costa Rica, between March 9–12, 2013. The two marathon events were held on March 17. A total of 41 events were contested, 20 by men and 21 by women. Men's pole vault, hammer throw, decathlon, and 35 km race walk, as well as women's high jump and pole vault were cancelled because the required minimum participation of 3 countries was not achieved.

== Medal summary ==
Complete results and medal winners can be found on the CADICA webpage.

=== Men ===
Event	Gold		Silver		Bronze	
100 metres (wind: −1.5 m/s)	Cruz Rolando Palacios (HON)	10.48	Mateo Edward (PAN)	10.58	Josef Norales (HON)	10.77
200 metres (wind: 2.1 m/s)	Alonso Edward (PAN)	20.52 w	Cruz Rolando Palacios (HON)	20.63 w	Gerald Drummond (CRC)	21.07 w
400 metres	Jarlex Lynch (CRC)	47.16 CR	Kessel Campbell (HON)	48.11	Rolando Ayala (ESA)	48.52
800 metres	Jenner Pelico (GUA)	1:51.16 CR	Víctor Emilio Ortiz (CRC)	1:51.21	Wilson Solano (CRC)	1:53.89
1500 metres	Víctor Manuel González (GUA)	3:58.00	Georman Rivas (CRC)	3:58.08	Jenner Pelico (GUA)	3:58.16
5000 metres	Víctor Manuel González (GUA)	14:49.30	José Francisco Chaves (CRC)	14:53.82	Alfredo Arévalo (GUA)	14:56.00
10,000 metres	Víctor Manuel González (GUA)	31:10.38	José Francisco Chaves (CRC)	31:12.65	Dimas Castro (NCA)	31:14.70
Marathon	José Amado García (GUA)	2:26:26	Jeremías Saloj (GUA)	2:28:41	Dirian Bonilla (NCA)	2:34:34
110 metres hurdles (wind: 2.0 m/s)	Ronald Bennett (HON)	14.43	Luis Carlos Bonilla (GUA)	14.85	Gerber Blanco (GUA)	15:17
400 metres hurdles	Kenneth Medwood (BIZ)	51.14	Gerald Drummond (CRC)	51.44	Gerber Blanco (GUA)	53.22
3000 metres steeplechase	Miguel Ángel Chan (GUA)	9:34.72	Georman Rivas (CRC)	9:35.25	Douglas Aguilar (ESA)	9:51.71
4 × 100 metres relay	Honduras; Kessel Campbell; Josef Norales; Ronald Bennett; Cruz Rolando Palacios	41.61	Costa Rica; Jaymar Hardy; Donald Arias; Denovan Hernández; Jorge Luis Jiménez	41.72	Nicaragua; Oliver Ñurinda; Mario Guerrero; José Benjamín Veliz; Daniel Alemán	42.88
4 × 400 metres relay	Costa Rica; Donald Arias; Luis Alonso Murillo; Gerald Drummond; Jarlex Lynch	3:11.15 CR	Nicaragua; Humberto Lugo; Roberto Rocha; José Benjamín Veliz; Daniel Alemán	3:22.10	Guatemala; Stiven Navarrete; Luis Carlos Bonilla; Querson Joaquín García; Gerber Blanco	3:29.86
20 Kilometres Road Walk	Allan Segura (CRC)	1:28:43	Mario Bran (GUA)	1:31:19	Mauricio Calvo (CRC)	1:31:31
High jump	Williams Ríos (PAN)	2.05	Henry Linton (CRC)	2.05	Henry Edmon (PAN)	2.02
Long jump	Irving Saladino (PAN)	7.99 (wind: -0.4 m/s)	Jhamal Bowen (PAN)	7.88 w (wind: 2.1 m/s)	Juan Mosquera (PAN)	7.45 (wind: 0.5 m/s)
Triple jump	Jason Castro (HON)	15.39 (wind: -1.0 m/s)	Juan Mosquera (PAN)	15.01 (wind: 1.3 m/s)	Brandon Terrell (BIZ)	14.98 (wind: 1.1 m/s)
Shot put	Luis Folgar (GUA)	15.62	Roberto Sawyers (CRC)	15.24	José Miguel Estrada (GUA)	14.24
Discus throw	Winston Campbell (HON)	51.64 CR	Roberto Sawyers (CRC)	46.93	Ever Acajabón (GUA)	44.18
Javelin throw	Luis Taracena (GUA)	64.31	Erick Méndez (CRC)	63.85	Rigoberto Calderón (NCA)	60.20

=== Women ===
Event	Gold		Silver		Bronze	
100 metres (wind: 2.1 m/s)	Ruth-Cassandra Hunt (PAN)	11.88 w	Glenda Davis (CRC)	12.19 w	Sarita Morales (CRC)	12.26 w
200 metres (wind: 1.2 m/s)	Shantely Scott (CRC)	23.84 CR	Ruth-Cassandra Hunt (PAN)	24.30	Glenda Davis (CRC)	24.35
400 metres	Dessiré Bermúdez (CRC)	54.90	Shantelly Scott (CRC)	55.09	Sharolyn Scott (CRC)	55.15
800 metres	Andrea Ferris (PAN)	2:06.39	Gladys Landaverde (ESA)	2:08.29	María Fernanda Aguilar (CRC)	2:18.65
1500 metres	Andrea Ferris (PAN)	4:31.62	Gladys Landaverde (ESA)	4:34.18	Rolanda Bell (PAN)	4:41.67
5000 metres	Élida Hernández De Xuyá (GUA)	17:08.62 CR	Rolanda Bell (PAN)	17:08.64	Gabriela Traña (CRC)	17:36.28
10,000 metres	Élida Hernández De Xuyá (GUA)	36:04.41 CR	Xiomara Barrera (ESA)	38:44.17	Delbin Cartagena (ESA)	38:48.77
Marathon	Gabriela Traña (CRC)	2:54:59 CR	Dina Judith Cruz (GUA)	3:03:51	Norma Rodríguez (CRC)	3:07:03
100 metres hurdles (wind: 1.9 m/s)	Jeimmy Bernárdez (HON)	14.42 CR	Ana María Porras (CRC)	14.51	Naomi Priscilla Smith (CRC)	15.39
400 metres hurdles	Sharolyn Scott (CRC)	59.57	Andrea Vargas (CRC)	64.72	Gabriela Guevara (PAN)	66.42
3000 metres steeplechase	Rolanda Bell (PAN)	11:07.77	Evonne Marroquín (GUA)	11:34.47	Candy Salazar (CRC)	11:58.86
4 x 100 metres relay	Panama; Kashani Ríos; Nathalee Aranda; Gabriela Guevara; Ruth-Cassandra Hunt	46.66 CR	Costa Rica; Diana Garita; Glenda Davis; Sarita Morales; Shantely Scott	46.66 CR	Guatemala; Stephanie Sofía Silva; Cristina Anelise Aldana; Thelma Fuentes; Maria José Rodas	52.55
4 x 400 metres relay	Costa Rica; Susana Chan; Sharolyn Scott; Shantely Scott; Dessiré Bermúdez	3:48.90 CR	Panama; Leyka Archibold; Gabriela Guevara; Nathalee Aranda; Andrea Ferris	3:52.21	Guatemala; Cora María Gutiérrez; Maria José Rodas; Ruth Morales; Evonne Marroquín	4:23.69
20 Kilometres Road Walk	Cristina López (ESA)	1:48:17	Sonia Barrondo (GUA)	1:51:43	Maritza Poncio (GUA)	1:53:50
Long jump	Ana María Porras (CRC)	5.67 (wind: -1.5 m/s)	Nathalee Aranda (PAN)	5.58 (wind: -1.3 m/s)	Ana Lucía Camargo (GUA)	5.34 (wind: -1.7 m/s)
Triple jump	Ana Lucía Camargo (GUA)	12.17 (wind: -1.8 m/s)	Ana María Martínez (PAN)	11.93 (wind: -1.6 m/s)	Thelma Fuentes (GUA)	11.53 (wind: -2.3 m/s)
Shot put	Nathyan Catano (PAN)	12.58	Aixa Middleton (PAN)	12.48	Sabrina Gaitán (GUA)	11.68
Discus throw	Aixa Middleton (PAN)	49.08 CR	Sabrina Gaitán (GUA)	39.78	Silvia Piñar (CRC)	37.39
Hammer throw	Sabrina Gaitán (GUA)	53.30	Elena Lojo (PAN)	46.86	Viviana Abarca (CRC)	46.26
Javelin throw	Dalila Rugama (NCA)	48.40	Génova Arias (CRC)	45.89	Rocío Navarro (PAN)	43.73
Heptathlon	Ana María Porras (CRC)	4785 pts CR	Katy Sealy (BIZ)	4398 pts	Ruth Morales (GUA)	4221 pts

== Medal table ==
The medal table (until March 12 without the marathon events) was published.

* Host nation (Costa Rica)

Rank	Nation	Gold	Silver	Bronze	Total
1	Guatemala (GUA)	12	7	14	33
2	Costa Rica (CRC)*	10	17	13	40
3	Panama (PAN)	10	10	5	25
4	Honduras (HON)	6	2	1	9
5	El Salvador (ESA)	1	3	3	7
6	Nicaragua (NIC)	1	1	4	6
7	Belize (BIZ)	1	1	1	3
Totals (7 entries)		41	41	41	123

== Participation ==
A total of 175 athletes (100 men and 75 women) from 7 countries were reported to participate:

- Belize (7)
- Costa Rica (54)
- El Salvador (14)
- Guatemala (39)
- Honduras (10)
- Nicaragua (18)
- (Panama) Panamá (33)
