= Nery Brenes =

Costa Rican sprinter

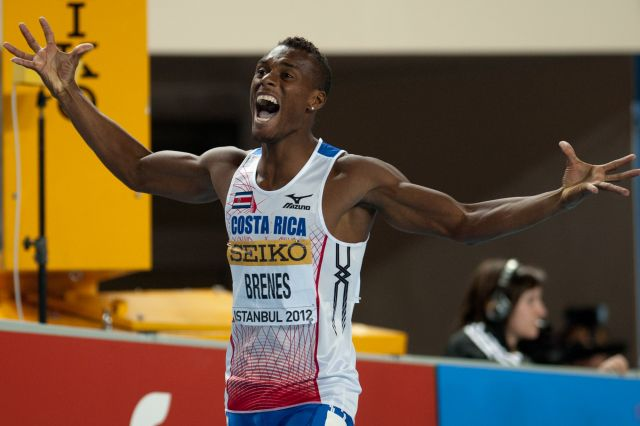
- Brenes celebrating his win at the 2012 World Indoor Championships.

Personal information
- Full name: Nery Antonio Brenes Cárdenas
- Nationality: Costa Rica
- Born: September 25, 1985 (age 40) Limón, Costa Rica
- Height: 1.74 m (5 ft 9 in)
- Weight: 62 kg (137 lb)

Sport
- Sport: Athletics
- Event: Sprints
- Coached by: Emmanuel Chanto

Achievements and titles
- Personal bests: 200 m: 20.20 (Rio de Janeiro 2016); 400 m: 44.60 (Madrid 2016)
Medal record
Men's athletics
Representing Costa Rica
World Indoor Championships
Gold medal – first place	2012 Istanbul	400 m
Pan American Games
Gold medal – first place	2011 Guadalajara	400 m
Ibero-American Championships
Gold medal – first place	2010 San Fernando	400 m
Bronze medal – third place	2014 São Paulo	400 m
Silver medal – second place	2018 Trujillo	400 m
Bronze medal – third place	2018 Trujillo	200 m
NACAC Championships
Bronze medal – third place	2007 San Salvador	400 m
Silver medal – second place	2015 San José	400 m
Silver medal – second place	2018 Toronto	400 m
Central American and Caribbean Games
Gold medal – first place	2010 Mayagüez	400 m
Bronze medal – third place	2018 Barranquilla	400 m
Central American Games
Gold medal – first place	2010 Panama City	400 m
Gold medal – first place	2010 Panama City	4 × 400 m relay
Gold medal – first place	2017 Managua	200 m
Gold medal – first place	2017 Managua	400 m

Nery Antonio Brenes Cárdenas (born September 25, 1985) is a Costa Rican sprinter. He is one of Costa Rica's most prominent track and field athletes and reached the semi-finals at the 400 m sprint in the 2008 Olympic Games in Beijing.

Brenes won the gold medal at the 2012 IAAF World Indoor Championships in Istanbul, setting a new national and championship record. "Brenes improved his personal mark by approximately one second, something nobody expected on a championship, taking the gold medal", cited his trainer and motivator Andrés Oro Fijo Calderón. He has participated in major events like the 2007 World Championships in Athletics in Osaka, Japan, and achieved a 4th-place finish at the 2008 IAAF World Indoor Championships in Valencia, Spain. He also finished in 3rd place at the 2008 ÅF Golden League meet in Oslo, Norway.

== Personal bests ==
=== Outdoor ===
- 200 m: 20.20 s – Rio de Janeiro, Brazil, 16 August 2016
- 400 m: 44.60 s – Madrid, Spain, 23 June 2016

=== Indoor ===
- 400 m: 45.11 s – Istanbul, Turkey, 10 March 2012

== International competitions ==
Year	Competition	Venue	Position	Event	Notes
Representing Costa Rica
2004	Central American Junior Championships	San José, Costa Rica	2nd	200 m	21.91 (-2.3 m/s)
2004	Central American Junior Championships	San José, Costa Rica	2nd	400 m	48.00
2004	Central American and Caribbean Junior Championships	Coatzacoalcos, Mexico	3rd	400 m	48.05
2004	Central American Championships	Managua, Nicaragua	1st	400 m	47.91
2004	Central American Championships	Managua, Nicaragua	1st	4 × 400 m	3:16.80 CR
2005	Central American Championships	San José, Costa Rica	1st	400 m	46.42 CR
2005	Central American Championships	San José, Costa Rica	1st	4 × 400 m	3:15.52 CR
2005	World Championships	Helsinki, Finland	38th (h)	400 m	47.11
2006	Central American and Caribbean Games	Cartagena, Colombia	16th (h)	200 m	21.94
2006	Central American and Caribbean Games	Cartagena, Colombia	18th (h)	400 m	47.57
2007	Central American Championships	San José, Costa Rica	1st	200 m	21.37 (+1.4 m/s)
2007	Central American Championships	San José, Costa Rica	1st	400 m	47.40
2007	Central American Championships	San José, Costa Rica	2nd	4 × 400 m	3:14.32
2007	NACAC Championships	San Salvador, El Salvador	3rd	400 m	46.00
2007	World Championships	Osaka, Japan	11th (sf)	400 m	45.01
2008	World Indoor Championships	Valencia, Spain	4th	400 m	46.65
2008	Olympic Games	Beijing, China	10th (sf)	400 m	44.94
2009	Central American and Caribbean Championships	Havana, Cuba	4th	400 m	45.92
2010	World Indoor Championships	Doha, Qatar	4th	400 m	46.55
2010	Central American Games	Panama City, Panama	1st	400 m	47.21 GR
2010	Central American Games	Panama City, Panama	1st	4 × 400 m	3:12.41 GR
2010	Ibero-American Championships	San Fernando, Spain	1st	400 m	45.19
2010	Central American and Caribbean Games	Mayagüez, Puerto Rico	1st	400 m	44.84
2010	Central American and Caribbean Games	Mayagüez, Puerto Rico	7th	4 × 400 m relay	3:10.21
2011	Central American Championships	San José, Costa Rica	1st	400 m	45.85 CR
2011	World Championships	Daegu, South Korea	17th (sf)	400 m	45.93
2011	Pan American Games	Guadalajara, Mexico	1st	400 m	44.65
2012	World Indoor Championships	Istanbul, Turkey	1st	400 m	45.11
2012	Olympic Games	London, United Kingdom	24th (h)	400 m	45.65
2013	Central American Championships	Managua, Nicaragua	1st	400 m	46.67
2013	Central American Championships	Managua, Nicaragua	1st	4 × 400 m relay	3:13.40
2013	Central American and Caribbean Championships	Morelia, Mexico	4th	400 m	46.22
2013	Central American and Caribbean Championships	Morelia, Mexico	6th	4 × 400 m	3:08.77
2013	World Championships	Moscow, Russia	24th (sf)	400 m	46.34
2014	World Indoor Championships	Sopot, Poland	6th	400 m	47.32
2014	Ibero-American Championships	São Paulo, Brazil	3rd	400 m	45.97
2014	Central American and Caribbean Games	Xalapa, Mexico	8th	400 m	46.82 A
2014	Central American and Caribbean Games	Xalapa, Mexico	5th	4 × 400 m relay	3:08.02 A
2015	NACAC Championships	San José, Costa Rica	2nd	400 m	45.22
2015	NACAC Championships	San José, Costa Rica	6th	4 × 400 m relay	3:07.34
2015	World Championships	Beijing, China	21st (sf)	400 m	45.41
2016	World Indoor Championships	Portland, United States	7th (sf)	400 m	46.49
2016	Olympic Games	Rio de Janeiro, Brazil	15th (sf)	200 m	20.33
2016	Olympic Games	Rio de Janeiro, Brazil	14th (sf)	400 m	45.02
2017	World Championships	London, United Kingdom	—	400 m	DQ
2018	World Indoor Championships	Birmingham, United Kingdom	–	400 m	DQ
2018	Central American and Caribbean Games	Barranquilla, Colombia	3rd	400 m	45.61
2018	Central American and Caribbean Games	Barranquilla, Colombia	6th	4 × 400 m relay	3:08.31
2018	NACAC Championships	Toronto, Canada	2nd	400 m	45.67
2018	Ibero-American Championships	Trujillo, Peru	3rd	200 m	20.88
2018	Ibero-American Championships	Trujillo, Peru	2nd	400 m	46.27
2019	Pan American Games	Lima, Peru	15th (h)	400 m	47.48

Olympic Games
Preceded by Gabriela Traña	Flagbearer for Costa Rica; Rio de Janeiro 2016	Succeeded by Andrea Vargas; Ian Sancho Chinchila
