= Athletics at the 2025 Central American Games =

Athletics at the XII Central American Games
- Dates: 18–21 October 2025
- Host city: Quetzaltenango, Guatemala
- Venue: Complejo Deportivo de Quetzaltenango
- Level: Senior
- Events: 37 (18 men, 19 women)
- Participation: 7 nations

Athletics competitions at the 2025 Central American Games were held at Complejo Deportivo de Quetzaltenango in Quetzaltenango, Guatemala, between 18 and 21 October 2025.

== Medal summary ==
=== Men ===
Event	Gold		Silver		Bronze	
100 metres (wind: -1.4 m/s)	Arturo Deliser; Panama	10.38	Alejandro Ricketts; Costa Rica	10.50	José Andrés Salazar; El Salvador	10.75
200 metres (wind: -0.5 m/s)	Gerald Drummond; Costa Rica	20.77	Alejandro Ricketts; Costa Rica	21.28	Arturo Deliser; Panama	21.34
400 metres	Pablo Andrés Ibáñez; El Salvador	46.90	Gary Altamirano; Costa Rica	47.34	Iñigo Pérez; Honduras	47.83
800 metres	Chamar Chambers; Panama	1:48.41 GR	Francisco Brenes; Costa Rica	1:50.25	Aarón Hernández; El Salvador	1:50.63
1500 metres	Diddier Rodríguez; Panama	3:50.53	Mario Pacay; Guatemala	3:52.45	Marcos Cruz; Guatemala	3:58.60
10,000 metres	Alberto González; Guatemala	30:23.37	Daniel Johanning; Costa Rica	31:07.74	Óscar Aldana; El Salvador	33:56.16
110 metres hurdles (wind: -0.9 m/s)	Wienstan Mena; Guatemala	13.78 GR, NR	Estebán Ibáñez; El Salvador	14.13	Gabriel Mejía; Honduras	14.89
3000 metres steeplechase	Diddier Rodríguez; Panama	9:28.00	Marcos Cruz; Guatemala	9:49.29	Only two competitors	
4 × 100 metres relay	El Salvador; Juan Carlos Rodríguez; Pablo Andrés Ibáñez; Estebán Ibáñez; José Andrés Salazar	40.30 GR, NR	Honduras; Evander Guity; Iñigo Pérez; Melique García; Ramiro Álvarez	40.72	Costa Rica; Derick Leandro; Rasheed Miller; Gary Altamirano; Alejandro Ricketts	40.74
4 × 400 metres relay	Costa Rica; José Pablo Elizondo; Derick Leandro; Gerald Drummond; Gary Altamirano	3:08.07 GR	El Salvador; Estebán Ibáñez; Samuel Ibáñez; José Andrés Salazar; Pablo Andrés Ibáñez	3:16.03	Nicaragua; Glen McCoy; Milton Rodríguez; Douglas Calero; Fredd Ponce	3:22.16
High jump	Ariel Molina; El Salvador	1.95	Andrés Núñez; Costa Rica	1.90	Denceel Álvarez; Guatemala	1.85
Long jump	Rasheed Miller; Costa Rica	7.70	Gabriel Mejía; Honduras	6.62	Juan Mosquera; Panama	6.40
Triple jump	Fernando Reyes; El Salvador	15.78	Jason Castro; Honduras	15.76	Brandon Jones; Belize	15.49
Shot put	Jeims Molina; Costa Rica	15.69	Billy López; Guatemala	14.97	Anselmo Delgado; Panama	14.82
Discus throw	Winston Campbell; Honduras	53.17 GR	Jeims Molina; Costa Rica	50.40	Marlon Quemé; Guatemala	43.48
Hammer throw	Carlos Arteaga; Nicaragua	64.09	Dylan Suárez; Costa Rica	60.84	David Ayala; El Salvador	58.99
Javelin throw	Iván Sibaja; Costa Rica	74.15 GR	Jonathan Cedeño; Panama	65.28	Luis Taracena; Guatemala	64.87
Decathlon	Guillermo Rivas; Guatemala	6842 GR	Osman Sanders; Nicaragua	5640	Mauricio Vega; Guatemala	4465

=== Women ===
Event	Gold		Silver		Bronze	
100 metres (wind: -1.1 m/s)	Mariandrée Chacón; Guatemala	11.66 GR, =NR	Nyasha Harris; Belize	11.86	María Alejandra Carmona; Nicaragua	11.84
200 metres (wind: -0.1 m/s)	Mariandrée Chacón; Guatemala	23.54 GR, NR	Cristal Cuervo; Panama	23.75	María Alejandra Carmona; Nicaragua	23.84
400 metres	Cristal Cuervo; Panama	53.31 GR	María Alejandra Carmona; Nicaragua	53.90	Desire Bermúdez; Costa Rica	54.47
800 metres	Angeline Pondler; Costa Rica	2:11.52	Débora Quel; Guatemala	2:11.90	Antonella Lanuza; Costa Rica	2:14.80
5000 metres	Viviana Aroche; Guatemala	16:50.49	Sandra Raxón; Guatemala	17:38.93	María Nellys Chaves; Costa Rica	19:39.13
10,000 metres	Viviana Aroche; Guatemala	35:04.21	Sandra Raxón; Guatemala	35:56.51	Idelma Delgado; El Salvador	38:12.30
100 metres hurdles (wind: +0.7 m/s)	Andrea Vargas; Costa Rica	13.27	Nancy Sandoval; El Salvador	13.61 NR	Leyka Archibold; Panama	13.87
400 metres hurdles	Gianna Woodruff; Panama	55.65	Daniela Rojas; Costa Rica	57.43	Mariangel Núñez; Costa Rica	59.72
3000 metres steeplechase	Débora Quel; Guatemala	12:03.81	María Nellys Chaves; Costa Rica	12:43.75	Esmeralda Ríos; Nicaragua	14:08.19
4 × 100 metres relay	Panama; Ivanna McFarlane; Cristal Cuervo; Leyka Archibold; Natalie Aranda	46.16	Costa Rica; Valeria Oviedo; Mariel Brokke; Abigail Obando, Rihana Mora	46.30	El Salvador; Nancy Sandoval; Ana Isabella González; Natalie Barrientos; Shantelly Scott	47.87
4 × 400 metres relay	Costa Rica; Daniela Rojas; Melissa Ramírez; Angeline Pondler; Desiré Bermudez	3:36.90	Panama; Ivanna McFarlane; Gianna Woodruff; Leyka Archibold; Cristal Cuervo	3:39.61	Nicaragua; Esmeralda Ríos; Alejandra Alvarado; Ingrid Narváez; María Alejandra Carmona	3:55.00
High jump	Abigail Obando; Costa Rica	1.70	Ana Isabella González; El Salvador	1.70	Thelma Fuentes; Guatemala	1.64
Pole vault	Andrea Velasco; El Salvador	3.60	Alessandra Obrist; Guatemala	3.60	Andrea Machuca; Costa Rica	3.40
Long jump	Natalie Aranda; Panama	6.22	Thelma Fuentes; Guatemala	6.22w	Danisha Chimilio; Guatemala	5.91
Triple jump	Danisha Chimilio; Guatemala	13.19	Thelma Fuentes; Guatemala	13.11	Rebeca Barrientos; Costa Rica	12.28
Shot put	Prizila Negrete; Honduras	13.74	Deisheline Mayers; Costa Rica	13.49	Débora Méndez; Guatemala	11.64
Hammer throw	Sophie Pérez; Guatemala	59.54	Gabrielle Figueroa; Honduras	58.02	Lindsay Reyes; Costa Rica	48.95
Javelin throw	Esperanza Sibaja; Nicaragua	49.94	Esther Padilla; Honduras	47.27	Deisheline Mayers; Costa Rica	43.70
Heptathlon	Abigail Obando; Costa Rica	5150	Ana Isabella González; El Salvador	4972	Ana Gabriela Granados; Nicaragua	2629

== Medal table ==
* Host nation (Guatemala)

Rank	Nation	Gold	Silver	Bronze	Total
1	Costa Rica (CRC)	10	12	9	31
2	Guatemala (GUA)*	10	9	8	27
3	Panama (PAN)	8	3	4	15
4	El Salvador (ESA)	5	5	6	16
5	Honduras	2	5	2	9
6	Nicaragua (NIC)	2	2	6	10
7	Belize (BIZ)	0	1	1	2
Totals (7 entries)		37	37	36	110
