= Nathalee Aranda =

Panamanian athlete (born 1995)

Personal information
- Full name: Nathalee Joane Aranda Robinson de Chambers
- Nationality: Panama
- Born: Nathalee Joane Aranda Robinson; 22 February 1995 (age 31)

Sport
- Event: Long jump

Nathalee Joane Aranda Robinson de Chambers (born 22 February 1995) is a Panamanian long jumper. She also participates in the 100 metres and 4 x 100 metres relay, having won several regional medals in Central America and South America.

== Long jump ==
She won many medals in age-specific competitions regionally and continentally.

In senior competitions she won the bronze medal at the 2011 Central American Championships, the silver medal at the 2012 Central American Championships, won the silver medal at the 2013 Central American Games, the silver medal at the 2013 Central American Championships, finished ninth at the 2015 South American Championships, won the silver medal at the 2016 Central American Championships, the gold medal at the 2017 Central American Championships, the gold medal at the 2017 Bolivarian Games, the gold medal at the 2017 Central American Games, the bronze medal at the 2018 South American Games, finished fifth at the 2018 Central American and Caribbean Games, fourth at the 2019 South American Championships, won the gold medal at the 2019 Central American Championships, finished fourth at the 2019 Pan American Games, won the gold medal at the 2020 South American Indoor Championships, the gold medal at the 2020 Central American Championships, the bronze medal at the 2021 South American Championships, the gold medal at the 2021 Central American Championships, the gold medal at the 2022 South American Indoor Championships, finished fifth at the 2022 Ibero-American Championships, won the silver medal at the 2022 Bolivarian Games, finished fourth at the 2022 South American Games, no-marked at the 2023 South American Championships, finished eighth at the 2024 South American Indoor Championships, fourth at the 2024 Ibero-American Championships, won the silver medal at the 2025 South American Indoor Championships, finished fifth at the 2025 South American Championships, won the gold medal at the 2025 Central American Games, the gold medal at the 2025 Central American Championships, finished seventh at the 2025 Bolivarian Games, won the gold medal at the 2026 Central American Championships, the silver medal at the 2026 Pan American Championships, the bronze medal at the 2026 Central American and Caribbean Games.

In global events, she competed at the 2015 Universiade and the 2020 Summer Olympics without reaching the final.

Her personal best jump is 6.60 metres, achieved at the 2018 South American Games in Cochabamba. This is the Panamanian record.

== Sprints ==
In the 100 metres she finished fourth at the at the 2012 Central American Championships and won the gold medal at the 2017 Central American Championships.

In the 4 x 100 metres relay she won a bronze medal at the 2011 Central American Championships, a silver medal at the 2012 Central American Championships, a gold medal at the 2013 Central American Games, a silver medal at the 2016 Central American Championships, a silver medal at the 2017 Central American Games, a gold medal at the 2025 Central American Championships, a gold medal at the 2025 Central American Games, a gold medal at the 2026 Central American Championships.

In the 4 x 400 metres relay she won a silver medal at the 2013 Central American Games.

She has one individual national title, having won the 100 metres at the Panamanian Championships in 2017. Her personal best time is 11.91 seconds.
