= Rori Lowe =

Honduran sprinter

Personal information
- Born: 1 September 2001 (age 24) Bronx, New York

Sport
- Sport: Athletics
- Event: Sprint
Medal record
Representing Honduras
Women's athletics
Central American Championships
Silver medal – second place	2025 Managua	100 m

Rori Lowe (born 1 September 2001) is a Honduran sprinter. She is the Honduran national record holder over 60 meters, 100 meters, 200 meters and the 4x100 meter relay. The 100 meter record was achieved while representing the country at the 2025 World Athletics Championships hosted in Tokyo, Japan.

== Biography ==
Lowe was educated in the United States and attended Christopher Columbus High School in the Bronx, New York City. She later competed for the University at Albany in 2019, and for Florida A&M University in 2024; recording personal best times of 11.42 seconds in the 100 meters and 23.70 seconds in the 200 meters.

In April 2025, Lowe ran underneath the Honduran national record for the 100 meters and 200 meters, running 11.78 seconds and 24.42 seconds, respectively. Lowe ran 11.43 seconds for the 100 metres on the 24 May 2025 at a meeting in Clermont in the United States, but the time was not ratified by World Athletics. From 31 July 2025, Lowe officially became eligible to represent Honduras in national representative competitions, having previously competed under the flag of the United States.

In August 2025, she won the silver medal in the 100 metres at the 2025 Central American Championships in Athletics in Nicuragua, running 11.70 seconds. She was also part of the Honduran women's 4 x 100 metres relay team alongside Kendi Rosales, Dariana Flores and Stephanie Hernandez, which set a new national record of 48.25 seconds at the Championships.

In September 2025, she competed for Honduras in the 100 metres at the 2025 World Championships in Tokyo, Japan, running a new Honduran national record time of 11.93 seconds.
