= Oscar Antonio Aldana =

Salvadoran long-distance runner

Personal information
- Born: 25 October 1990 (age 34)

Sport
- Country: El Salvador
- Sport: Athletics
- Event: Long-distance running

Oscar Antonio Aldana (born 25 October 1990) is a Salvadoran long-distance runner. He represented El Salvador at the World Half Marathon Championships both in 2018 and in 2020.

In 2018, he competed in the men's half marathon at the 2018 IAAF World Half Marathon Championships held in Valencia, Spain. He finished in 127th place.

In 2019, he competed in the senior men's race at the 2019 IAAF World Cross Country Championships held in Aarhus, Denmark. He finished in 132nd place.

In 2020, he competed in the men's race at the 2020 World Athletics Half Marathon Championships held in Gdynia, Poland.
