= Natán Rivera =

Salvadoran pole vaulter

Personal information
- Born: 12 December 1998 (age 27) El Salvador
- Education: Rice University
- Height: 1.75 m (5 ft 9 in)
- Weight: 66 kg (146 lb)

Sport
- Country: El Salvador
- Sport: Track and field
- Event: Pole vault
- College team: Rice Owls
- Coached by: David Butler
- Updated on 29 August 2015

Natán Armando Rivera Alas (born 12 December 1998) is a Salvadoran athlete specialising in the pole vault.

Still a youth athlete, he won the gold medal at the 2015 NACAC Championships although in rather unusual circumstances. His rivals having much better personal bests than Rivera, who managed to jump 4.70 meters, entered the competition much higher but none of them actually cleared the bar. This left him as the sole athlete to record a valid jump and the gold medalist. This victory earned him a spot at the 2015 World Championships in Beijing, where, however, the opening height of 5.25 metres, way above his then PB of 4.70 metres, proved too much for him.

His current personal bests in the event are 5.35 meters outdoors (Austin, TX 2019) and 5.20 metres indoors (Houston, TX 2019). Both are national records.

== Competition record ==
Year	Competition	Venue	Position	Notes
Representing El Salvador
2015	Pan American Youth Championships	Cali, Colombia	1st	4.56 m
2015	Central American Championships	Managua, Nicaragua	1st	4.55 m
2015	NACAC Championships	San José, Costa Rica	1st	4.70 m
2015	World Championships	Beijing, China	–	NM
2016	Ibero-American Championships	Rio de Janeiro, Brazil	6th	4.70 m
2016	NACAC U23 Championships	San Salvador, El Salvador	4th	4.70 m
2017	Pan American U20 Championships	Trujillo, Peru	2nd	5.10 m
2018	Central American and Caribbean Games	Barranquilla, Colombia	4th	5.10 m
2019	NACAC U23 Championships	Querétaro City, Mexico	3rd	4.90 m
2019	Pan American Games	Lima, Peru	–	NM

== See also ==
- El Salvador at the 2015 World Championships in Athletics
