= Gerald Drummond (athlete) =

Costa Rican athletics competitor

Personal information
- Born: 5 September 1994 (age 32) San José, Costa Rica
- Education: University Saint Paula
- Height: 1.75 m (5 ft 9 in)
- Weight: 67 kg (148 lb)

Sport
- Sport: Athletics
- Event: 400 metres hurdles

Gerald David Drummond Hernández (born 5 September 1994) is a Costa Rican athlete specialising in the 400 metres hurdles. He has won multiple medals at regional level. In addition, he is his country's national record holder in the event. He competed at the 2020 Summer Olympics.

His father Gerald Drummond Johnson was a footballer.

== International competitions ==
Year	Competition	Venue	Position	Event	Notes
Representing Costa Rica
2010	Central American Junior; Championships (U18)	Panama City, Panama	3rd	400 m hurdles (84 cm)	55.79
2010	Central American Junior; Championships (U18)	Panama City, Panama	1st	Medley relay	1:59.12
2010	Central American and Caribbean; Junior Championships (U17)	Santo Domingo, Dominican Rep.	9th (h)	110 m hurdles (91.4 cm)	14.19
2010	Central American and Caribbean; Junior Championships (U17)	Santo Domingo, Dominican Rep.	4th	400 m hurdles (84 cm)	56.35
2010	Youth Olympic Games	Singapore	5th (B)	400 m hurdles (84 cm)	54.83
2011	World Youth Championships	Lille, France	48th (h)	200 m	22.55
2011	World Youth Championships	Lille, France	24th (sf)	400 m hurdles (84 cm)	54.65
2012	Central American Junior; Championships (U-20)	San Salvador, El Salvador	1st	400 m hurdles	52.49
2012	Central American Junior; Championships (U-20)	San Salvador, El Salvador	1st	4 × 400 m relay	3:13.51
2012	Central American Championships	Managua, Nicaragua	2nd	400 m hurdles	53.33
2012	Central American Championships	Managua, Nicaragua	1st	4 × 400 m relay	3:12.42
2012	Central American and Caribbean; Junior Championships (U20)	San Salvador, El Salvador	10th (h)	400 m hurdles	54.07
2012	Central American and Caribbean; Junior Championships (U20)	San Salvador, El Salvador	5th	4 × 400 m relay	3:13.92
2012	World Junior Championships	Barcelona, Spain	44th (h)	400 m hurdles	53.46
2013	Central American Games	San José, Costa Rica	3rd	200 m	21.07 (w)
2013	Central American Games	San José, Costa Rica	2nd	400 m hurdles	51.44
2013	Central American Games	San José, Costa Rica	1st	4 × 400 m relay	3:11.15
2013	Central American Junior; Championships (U-20)	San José, Costa Rica	1st	200 m	21.69
2013	Central American Junior; Championships (U-20)	San José, Costa Rica	1st	400 m	48.72
2013	Central American Junior; Championships (U-20)	San José, Costa Rica	2nd	400 m hurdles	54.15
2013	Central American Junior; Championships (U-20)	San José, Costa Rica	1st	4 × 400 m relay	3:18.17
2013	Central American Championships	Managua, Nicaragua	2nd	400 m hurdles	52.55
2013	Central American Championships	Managua, Nicaragua	1st	4 × 400 m relay	3.13.40
2013	Central American and Caribbean; Championships	Morelia, Mexico	11th (h)	400 m hurdles	52.53
2013	Central American and Caribbean; Championships	Morelia, Mexico	6th	4 × 400 m relay	3:08.77
2013	Pan American Junior Championships	Medellín, Colombia	5th	400 m hurdles	51.80
2014	Central American Championships	Tegucigalpa, Honduras	1st	400 m	47.20
2014	Central American Championships	Tegucigalpa, Honduras	1st	400 m hurdles	50.78
2014	Central American Championships	Tegucigalpa, Honduras	1st	4 × 400 m relay	3:20.17
2014	Ibero-American Championships	São Paulo, Brazil	4th	400 m hurdles	50.41
2014	NACAC U23 Championships	Kamloops, Canada	3rd	400 m hurdles	51.05
2014	NACAC U23 Championships	Kamloops, Canada	3rd	4 × 400 m relay	3:14.29
2014	Central American and Caribbean Games	Xalapa, Mexico	5th	400 m hurdles	50.72
2014	Central American and Caribbean Games	Xalapa, Mexico	5th	4 × 400 m relay	3:08.02
2015	Pan American Games	Toronto, Canada	21st (h)	400 m hurdles	53.47
2015	Pan American Games	Toronto, Canada	8th	4 × 400 m relay	3:05.21
2015	NACAC Championships	San José, Costa Rica	7th	400 m hurdles	50.63
2015	NACAC Championships	San José, Costa Rica	6th	4 × 400 m relay	3:07.34
2015	Universiade	Gwangju, South Korea	22nd (sf)	400 m hurdles	53.35
2015	Universiade	Gwangju, South Korea	14th (h)	4 × 400 m relay	3:19.34
2016	Ibero-American Championships	Rio de Janeiro, Brazil	13th (h)	400 m hurdles	52.05
2016	NACAC U23 Championships	San Salvador, El Salvador	8th	400 m hurdles	53.02
2017	Central American Championships	Tegucigalpa, Honduras	1st	400 m	46.76
2017	Central American Championships	Tegucigalpa, Honduras	1st	400 m hurdles	51.43
2017	Universiade	Taipei, Taiwan	26th (h)	400 m hurdles	52.22
2017	Central American Games	Managua, Nicaragua	2nd	400 m	47.13
2017	Central American Games	Managua, Nicaragua	–	400 m hurdles	DQ
2017	Central American Games	Managua, Nicaragua	1st	4 × 400 m relay	3:13.98
2018	Central American and Caribbean Games	Barranquilla, Colombia	6th	400 m hurdles	49.94
2018	Central American and Caribbean Games	Barranquilla, Colombia	6th	4 × 400 m relay	3:08.31
2018	NACAC Championships	Toronto, Canada	10th (q)	400 m hurdles	50.65
2018	Ibero-American Championships	Trujillo, Peru	2nd	400 m hurdles	49.80
2021	Olympic Games	Tokyo, Japan	27th (h)	400 m hurdles	49.92
2022	Ibero-American Championships	La Nucía, Spain	1st	400 m hurdles	48.87
2022	World Championships	Eugene, United States	13th (sf)	400 m hurdles	49.37
2022	NACAC Championships	Freeport, Bahamas	4th	400 m hurdles	48.88
2023	Central American and Caribbean Games	San Salvador, El Salvador	4th	400 m hurdles	49.62
2023	World Championships	Budapest, Hungary	19th (sf)	400 m hurdles	49.31
2023	Pan American Games	Santiago, Chile	–	400 m hurdles	DQ
2024	Olympic Games	Paris, France	21st (sf)	400 m hurdles	49.68
2025	Central American Championships	Managua, Nicaragua	1st	400 m hurdles	49.11
2025	NACAC Championships	Freeport, Bahamas	6th	400 m hurdles	49.08
2025	World Championships	Tokyo, Japan	21st (sf)	400 m hurdles	49.58
2025	Central American Games	Quetzaltenango, Guatemala	1st	200 m	20.77
2025	Central American Games	Quetzaltenango, Guatemala	1st	4 × 400 m relay	3:08.07
2026	Pan American Championships	Medellín, Colombia	2nd	400 m hurdles	48.76
2026	Central American and Caribbean Games	Santo Domingo, Dominican Republic	4th (h)	400 m hurdles	49.60^{1}

^{1}Disqualified in the final

== Circuit performances ==
Grand Slam Track results
Slam	Race group	Event	Pl.	Time	Prize money
2025 Philadelphia Slam	Long hurdles	400 m hurdles	7th	50.39	US$12,500
2025 Philadelphia Slam	Long hurdles	400 m	6th	47.37	US$12,500

== Personal bests ==
Outdoor

- 200 metres – 21.13 (-0.9 m/s, Medellín 2016)
- 400 metres – 46.09 (Heredia 2019)
- 400 metres hurdles – 49.31 (San José 2021)

Olympic Games
Preceded by Ian Sancho; Andrea Vargas	Flag bearer for Costa Rica; Paris 2024 with Milagro Mena	Succeeded by Incumbent
