= Andrea Vargas =

Costa Rican hurdler

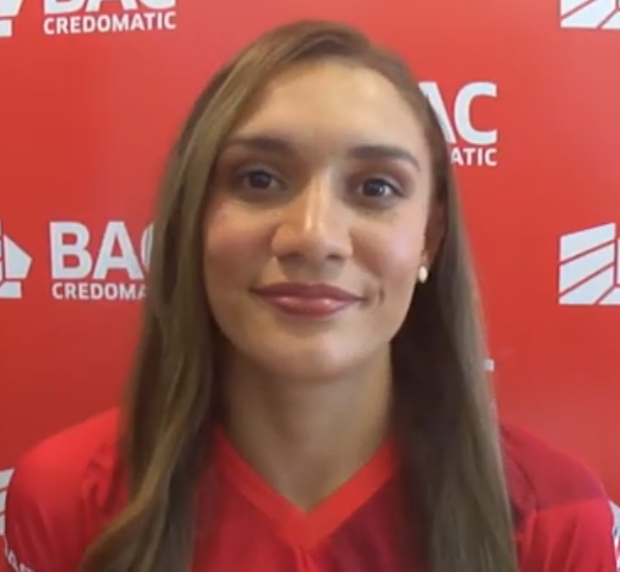
- Vargas in a 2019 interview

Personal information
- Born: 28 May 1996 (age 30) San José, Costa Rica
- Height: 1.68 m (5 ft 6 in)
- Weight: 60 kg (132 lb)

Sport
- Sport: Athletics
- Event: 100 metres hurdles
Medal record
Representing Costa Rica
Pan American Games
Gold medal – first place	2019 Lima	100 m hurdles
Gold medal – first place	2023 Santiago	100 m hurdles

Andrea Carolina Vargas Mena (born 28 May 1996) is a Costa Rican athlete specialising in the sprint hurdles. She is the 2019 and 2023 Pan American Games champion in the 100 metres hurdles. She is the current national record holder in the 100 metres hurdles. She competed at the 2020 Summer Olympics and was Costa Rica's flag bearer in the opening ceremonies.

== Career ==
Vargas competed at her first running competition when she was four years old and competed for the first time internationally when she was ten.

Vargas competed in the 60 metres hurdles at the 2018 IAAF World Indoor Championships but did not advance out of the heats. She then won the 100 metres hurdles title at the 2018 Central American and Caribbean Games and set a new national record. She won another gold medal in the event at the 2018 Ibero-American Championships in Athletics, becoming the first Costa Rican woman to win an event at the Ibero-American Championships.

Vargas represented Costa Rica at the 2019 Pan American Games and won the gold medal in the 100 metres hurdles with a time of 12.82. She was the third person and the first woman to win a medal at the Pan American Games for Costa Rica in athletics. Additionally, she met the Olympic qualifying standards with her time in the semifinals. At the 2019 World Athletics Championships, she advanced into the 100 metres hurdles finals and placed fifth, setting the national record of 12.64 seconds, after also setting national records in the heats and semifinals.

Vargas represented Costa Rica at the 2020 Summer Olympics and was selected as one of the flag bearers in the opening ceremonies. She competed in the 100 metres hurdles and won her heat with a time of 12.71 seconds. She ran a time of 12.69 seconds in the semifinals and was the fastest athlete to not advance to the finals. She finished 15th in the 100 metres hurdles semifinals at the 2022 World Athletics Championships and did not advance into the finals.

At the 2023 Pan American Games, Vargas successfully defended her 100 metres hurdles title. She won a bronze medal in the 100 metres hurdles at the 2023 Central American and Caribbean Games.

== Personal life ==
Vargas is the oldest of three children and is coached by her parents. Her younger sister, Noelia Vargas, competes internationally in racewalking. She has one daughter, born in 2015. She graduated from the Universidad Panamericana and passed the national bar examination.

== International competitions ==
Year	Competition	Venue	Position	Event	Notes
Representing Costa Rica
2010	Central American and Caribbean; Junior Championships (U17)	Santo Domingo, Dominican Republic	2nd	Heptathlon (youth)	3972 pts
2011	Central American Junior and Youth Championships (U18)	San Salvador, El Salvador	2nd	400 m hurdles (76.2 cm)	66.78
2013	Central American Games	San José, Costa Rica	1st	400 m hurdles	1:04.72
2013	World Youth Championships	Donetsk, Ukraine	15th (h)	100 m hurdles (76.2 cm)	14.34
2014	Central American Junior Championships	Morelia, Mexico	2nd	100 m hurdles	13.72
2014	World Junior Championships	Eugene, United States	24th (sf)	100 m hurdles	14.11 (w)
2016	NACAC U23 Championships	San Salvador, El Salvador	11th (h)	200 m	25.18
2016	NACAC U23 Championships	San Salvador, El Salvador	6th	100 m hurdles	13.65
2017	Central American Games	Managua, Nicaragua	1st	100 m hurdles	13.12
2018	World Indoor Championships	Birmingham, United Kingdom	32nd (h)	60 m hurdles	8.34
2018	Central American and Caribbean Games	Barranquilla, Colombia	1st	100 m hurdles	12.90
2018	NACAC Championships	Toronto, Canada	3rd	100 m hurdles	12.91
2018	Ibero-American Championships	Trujillo, Peru	1st	100 m hurdles	13.04
2019	Pan American Games	Lima, Peru	1st	100 m hurdles	12.82
2019	World Championships	Doha, Qatar	5th	100 m hurdles	12.64
2021	Olympic Games	Tokyo, Japan	9th (sf)	100 m hurdles	12.69
2022	World Championships	Eugene, United States	15th (sf)	100 m hurdles	12.82
2023	Central American and Caribbean Games	San Salvador, El Salvador	3rd	100 m hurdles	13.02
2023	Pan American Games	Santiago, Chile	1st	100 m hurdles	13.09
2025	Central American Championships	Managua, Nicaragua	1st	100 m hurdles	13.28
2025	Central American Championships	Managua, Nicaragua	3rd	4 × 100 m relay	47.83
2025	NACAC Championships	Freeport, Bahamas	8th	100 m hurdles	13.46
2025	Central American Games	Quetzaltenango, Guatemala	1st	100 m hurdles	13.27
2026	Central American and Caribbean Games	Santo Domingo, Dominican Republic	10th (h)	100 m hurdles	13.93

Olympic Games
Preceded by Nery Brenes	Flag bearer for Costa Rica; Tokyo 2020 with Ian Sancho Chinchila	Succeeded by Gerald Drummond; Milagro Mena
