= Yeykell Romero =

Nicaraguan sprinter

Yeykell Eliuth Romero
Personal information
- Full name: Yeykell Eliuth Romero Rodríguez
- Nationality: Nicaragua
- Born: 16 November 2002 (age 22)

Sport
- Sport: Track and Field
- Event: 100m

Yeykell Eliuth Romero Rodríguez (born 16 November 2002) is a Nicaraguan sprinter and national record holder.

In 2021 he broke a 35-year-old national record in the 100 metres running a time of 10.65. The previous record of 10.70 was set in 1986 by Roberto Guillen. In June 2021 he ran 10.50 at the Central American Championships to break the record again. At the Athletics at the 2020 Summer Olympics – Men's 100 metres he ran 10.62 to qualify from the preliminary heats.

== Personal life ==
He studied Industrial Engineering at the National Autonomous University of Nicaragua. As a youngster he was a member of the Nicaragua youth national team in baseball and initially began training in athletics to help improve his performance in baseball.
