= Daniela Rojas =

Costa Rican hurdler

Daniela Rojas Gutiérrez
Personal information
- Born: 26 November 1997 (age 28)

Sport
- Sport: Athletics
- Event: 400 metres hurdles
Medal record
Representing Costa Rica
Women's athletics
Pan American Games
Bronze medal – third place	2023 Santiago	400 m hurdles
Central American and Caribbean Games
Bronze medal – third place	2023 San Salvador	400 m hurdles
Bronze medal – third place	2026 Santo Domingo	400 m hurdles
Central American Championships
Gold medal – first place	2025 Managua	400 m hurdles

Daniela Rojas Gutiérrez (born 26 November 1997) is a Costa Rican athlete specialising in the 400 metres hurdles.

== Biography ==
She won a bronze medal in the 400 metres hurdles at the 2023 Central American and Caribbean Games in San Salvador, El Salvador in July 2023 in 56.58 seconds. She won a bronze medal in the 400 metres at the 2023 Pan American Games in Santiago in 57.41 seconds.

In July 2025, she set a new national record in the 400m hurdles with a time of 56.15 in Madrid, Spain. The previous record, 56.19 was set in 2012 by the Olympic athlete Sharolyn Scott. She broke her own national record in the 400 meter hurdles at the 2025 NACAC Championships, running 55.67 seconds. She qualified via her world ranking to compete at the 2025 World Athletics Championships in Tokyo, Japan, running 56.08 seconds without qualifying for the semi-finals of the 400 metres hurdles.

In August 2026, she won the bronze medal in the 400 metres hurdles at the 2026 CAC Games in Santo Domingo, Dominican Republic.
