= Estadio Olímpico del IND Managua =

- "El Olímpico"
- Interactive map of Estadio Olímpico del IND Managua
- Full name: Estadio Olímpico del IND Managua
- Location: Managua, Nicaragua
- Operator: Instituto Nacional de Deportes
- Capacity: 10,000

Construction
- Opened: 1957
- Renovated: 2016
- Expanded: 2016

Tenants
- América Managua; Juventus F.C. (Nicaragua); Halcones FC Managua; Formacion Nica; Capital FC Managua

Estadio Olímpico del IND Managua is a multi-use stadium in Managua, Nicaragua. It is currently used mostly for football matches, on club level by América Managua, Juventus F.C., Formacion Nica of the Liga De Ascenso de Nicaragua. The stadium has a capacity of 10,000 spectators.
