= José Andrés Salazar =

El Salvadoran sprinter (born 1997)

Personal information
- Full name: José Andrés Salazar Mijangos
- Nationality: El Salvador
- Born: 11 January 1997 (age 29)

Sport
- Sport: Track and Field
- Events: 100m, 200m

José Andrés Salazar Mijangos (born 11 January 1997) is a sprinter from El Salvador who competed at the 2020 Summer Olympics.

== Early and personal life ==
Salazar played association football in the third division of the El Salvadorian leagues before switching his full attention to competing at athletics in 2017. His father had also been a footballer in El Salvador.

== Career ==
Salazar competed in the men's 200m race at the 2020 Summer Olympics; he ran 21.66 seconds to finish seventh in his heat. Salazar was almost unable to compete after suffering a muscle injury to his right thigh competing in the 100 metres at the 2021 Central American Championships in Athletics, in Costa Rica, on June 26 2021.
