= María Lourdes Ruiz =

Nicaraguan athlete (1965–2025)

Personal information
- Full name: María Lourdes Ruiz Obando
- Nickname: Lula
- Born: 15 October 1965 Managua, Nicaragua
- Died: 6 February 2025 (aged 59)

Sport
- Sport: Athletics
- Event(s): Discus throw, shot put

María Lourdes Ruiz Obando (15 October 1965 – 6 February 2025) was a Nicaraguan athlete who specialised in the discus throw. She represented her country at the 1991 World Championships in Tokyo without advancing to the final.

Apart from athletics she also competed in weightlifting. Ruiz died on 6 February 2025, at the age of 59.

== International competitions ==
Year	Competition	Venue	Position	Event	Notes
Representing Nicaragua
1984	Central American Championships	Guatemala City, Guatemala	1st	Discus throw	35.36
1984	Central American Championships	Guatemala City, Guatemala	2nd	Javelin throw	36.46
1986	Central American Games	Guatemala City, Guatemala	2nd	Discus throw	
1988	Ibero-American Championships	Mexico City, Mexico	–	Javelin throw	NM
1990	Central American Games	Tegucigalpa, Honduras	1st	Shot put	12.32 m
1990	Central American Games	Tegucigalpa, Honduras	1st	Discus throw	44.66 m
1990	Central American and Caribbean Games	Mexico City, Mexico	7th	Shot put	11.41 m
1990	Central American and Caribbean Games	Mexico City, Mexico	5th	Discus throw	43.10 m
1991	Central American Championships	Tegucigalpa, Honduras	1st	Discus throw	42.30
1991	Central American Championships	Tegucigalpa, Honduras	3rd	Javelin throw	33.72
1991	Pan American Games	Havana, Cuba	8th	Discus throw	42.50 m
1991	World Championships	Tokyo, Japan	29th (q)	Discus throw	41.78 m
1992	Ibero-American Championships	Seville, Spain	6th	Shot put	11.16 m
1992	Ibero-American Championships	Seville, Spain	8th	Discus throw	44.60 m
1993	Central American and Caribbean Games	Ponce, Puerto Rico	7th	Shot put	11.57 m
1993	Central American and Caribbean Games	Ponce, Puerto Rico	5th	Discus throw	44.18 m
1994	Central American Games	San Salvador, El Salvador	2nd	Discus throw	
1997	Central American Games	San Pedro Sula, Honduras	4th	Shot put	10.63 m
1997	Central American Games	San Pedro Sula, Honduras	2nd	Discus throw	40.88 m
1998	Central American and Caribbean Games	Maracaibo, Venezuela	8th	Discus throw	39.27 m
2001	Central American Games	Guatemala City, Guatemala	4th	Shot put	10.03 m
2001	Central American Games	Guatemala City, Guatemala	3rd	Discus throw	37.67 m
2002	Central American Championships	San José, Costa Rica	2nd	Shot put	10.41 m
2002	Central American Championships	San José, Costa Rica	3rd	Discus throw	37.77 m
2002	Central American and Caribbean Games	San Salvador, El Salvador	4th	Shot put	9.95 m
2002	Central American and Caribbean Games	San Salvador, El Salvador	5th	Discus throw	36.64 m
2003	Central American Championships	Guatemala City, Guatemala	2nd	Shot put	10.85 m
2003	Central American Championships	Guatemala City, Guatemala	3rd	Discus throw	35.93 m
2004	Central American Championships	Managua, Nicaragua	1st	Shot put	11.54 m
2004	Central American Championships	Managua, Nicaragua	1st	Discus throw	40.24 m
2005	Central American Championships	San José, Costa Rica	4th	Shot put	10.77 m
2005	Central American Championships	San José, Costa Rica	4th	Discus throw	36.71 m
2006	Central American Games	Managua, Nicaragua	1st	Discus throw	42.18 m
2007	Central American Championships	San José, Costa Rica	4th	Shot put	10.40 m
2007	Central American Championships	San José, Costa Rica	3rd	Discus throw	36.18 m
2010	Central American Games	Panama City, Panama	4th	Shot put	10.74 m
2010	Central American Games	Panama City, Panama	5th	Discus throw	33.74 m

== Personal bests ==
- Shot put – 12.92 metres (Managua 1989)
- Discus throw – 47.90 metres (Managua 1989)
