= Jeimy Bernárdez =

Honduran hurdler

Personal information
- Full name: Jeimmy Julissa Bernárdez Santos
- Born: 3 September 1986 (age 39) Tela, Atlántida, Honduras
- Height: 1.67 m (5 ft 5 1/2 in)
- Weight: 59 kg (130 lb)

Sport
- Country: Honduras
- Sport: Athletics
- Events: Hurdling, Sprint
Medal record
Women's Athletics
Representing Honduras
Central American Games
Gold medal – first place	2010 Panama City	100 m hurdles
Gold medal – first place	2006 Managua	100 m hurdles
Silver medal – second place	2006 Managua	4x100 m relay
Silver medal – second place	2006 Managua	4x400 m relay
Central American Championships
Gold medal – first place	2012 Managua	100 m hurdles
Gold medal – first place	2011 San José	100 m hurdles
Gold medal – first place	2010 Guatemala City	100 m hurdles
Gold medal – first place	2009 Guatemala City	100 m hurdles
Gold medal – first place	2008 San Pedro Sula	100 m hurdles
Gold medal – first place	2007 San José	100 m hurdles
Gold medal – first place	2005 San José	100 m hurdles
Gold medal – first place	2004 Managua	100 m hurdles
Bronze medal – third place	2011 San José	100 m
Bronze medal – third place	2004 Managua	100 m
- Updated on 14 July 2014

Jeimy Bernárdez (born 3 September 1986) is a Honduran runner. She competed in the 100 metres hurdles event at the 2012 Summer Olympics.

== Personal best ==
Outdoor

- 100 m: 12.14 s (wind: -0.6 m/s) – San José, Costa Rica, 24 June 2011
- 100 m hurdles: 13.83 s A (wind: -0.6 m/s) – Toluca, Mexico, 21 July 2008

Indoor

- 60 m hurdles: 8.52 s – Seville, Spain, 21 February 2009

== Achievements ==
Year	Competition	Venue	Position	Event	Notes
Representing Honduras
2004	Central American Junior Championships (U20)	San José, Costa Rica	3rd	100m	12.82 (wind: -1.9 m/s)
2004	Central American Junior Championships (U20)	San José, Costa Rica	2nd	100 m hurdles	15.69 (wind: -1.4 m/s)
2004	Central American and Caribbean Junior Championships (U-20)	Coatzacoalcos, Mexico	4th (h)	100 m	12.79 s (wind: -0.3 m/s)
2004	Central American and Caribbean Junior Championships (U-20)	Coatzacoalcos, Mexico	7th	100 m hurdles	15.31 s (wind: +1.6 m/s)
2004	Ibero-American Championships	Huelva, Spain	15th (h)	100 m	12.64 s (-0.9 m/s)
2004	Ibero-American Championships	Huelva, Spain	11th (h)	100 m hurdles	15.78 s (-0.5 m/s)
2004	Central American Championships	Managua, Nicaragua	3rd	100 m	12.60 s
2004	Central American Championships	Managua, Nicaragua	1st	100 m hurdles	15.06 s
2005	Central American Championships	San José, Costa Rica	5th	100 m	12.80 (wind: -3.7 m/s)
2005	Central American Championships	San José, Costa Rica	1st	100 m hurdles	14.72 s CR (-1.3 m/s)
2005	Central American Championships	San José, Costa Rica	5th	4 × 100 m relay	53.76
2005	World Championships	Helsinki, Finland	32nd (h)	100 m hurdles	14.78 s (+1.2 m/s)
2006	Central American Games	Managua, Nicaragua	1st	100 m hurdles	14.18 s w (+2.1 m/s)
2006	Central American Games	Managua, Nicaragua	2nd	4 × 100 m relay	49.51 s
2006	Central American Games	Managua, Nicaragua	2nd	4 × 400 m relay	4:47.89 min
2006	Ibero-American Championships	Ponce, Puerto Rico	7th	100 m hurdles	14.28 s (-0.2 m/s)
2006	NACAC U23 Championships	Santo Domingo, Dominican Republic	6th	100 m hurdles	14.21 s (+0.4 m/s)
2006	Central American and Caribbean Games	Cartagena, Colombia	9th (h)	100 m hurdles	14.04 s (+2.1 m/s)
2007	ALBA Games	Caracas, Venezuela	1st	100 m hurdles	14.31 s (wind: +0.1 m/s)
2007	Central American Championships	San José, Costa Rica	1st	100 m hurdles	14.42 s (+1.0 m/s)
2007	NACAC Championships	San Salvador, El Salvador	5th	100 m hurdles	13.96 s (+0.2 m/s)
2007	Pan American Games	Rio de Janeiro, Brazil	14th (h)	100 m hurdles	14.05 s (+0.9 m/s)
2007	World Championships	Osaka, Japan	32nd (h)	100 m hurdles	14.35 s (+0.2 m/s)
2008	Ibero-American Championships	Iquique, Chile	7th	100 m hurdles	14.28 s (-0.5 m/s)
2008	Central American Championships	San Pedro Sula, Honduras	—	100 m	DQ
2008	Central American Championships	San Pedro Sula, Honduras	1st	100 m hurdles	14.11 s CR (+1.0 m/s)
2008	Central American Championships	San Pedro Sula, Honduras	—	4 × 100 m relay	DQ
2008	NACAC Under-23 Championships	Toluca, Mexico	4th	100 m hurdles	13.83 (wind: -0.6 m/s) A
2008	Olympic Games	Beijing, China	39th (h)	100 m hurdles	14.29 s (-0.6 m/s)
2009	Central American Championships	Guatemala City, Guatemala	1st	100 m hurdles	14.32 s (+0.5 m/s)
2009	Universiade	Belgrade, Serbia	20th (h)	100 m hurdles	14.06 s (+1.6 m/s)
2009	World Championships	Berlin, Germany	37th (h)	100 m hurdles	14.53 s (+0.1 m/s)
2010	Central American Games	Panama City, Panama	1st	100 m hurdles	14.55 s GR (-0.5 m/s)
2010	Ibero-American Championships	San Fernando, Spain	–	100 m hurdles	DQ
2010	Central American and Caribbean Games	Mayagüez, Puerto Rico	10th (h)	100 m hurdles	14.27 s (0.0 m/s)
2010	Central American Championships	Guatemala City, Guatemala	1st	100 m hurdles	14.63 s (+0.2 m/s)
2011	Central American Championships	San José, Costa Rica	3rd	100 m	12.14 s (-0.6 m/s)
2011	Central American Championships	San José, Costa Rica	1st	100 m hurdles	14.85 s (-0.5 m/s)
2011	Central American and Caribbean Championships	Mayagüez, Puerto Rico	16th (h)	100 m hurdles	14.64 s (-3.3 m/s)
2011	Universiade	Shenzhen, China	28th (h)	100 m hurdles	14.27 s (-1.0 m/s)
2011	World Championships	Daegu, South Korea	38th (h)	100 m hurdles	14.45 s (-0.1 m/s)
2011	Pan American Games	Guadalajara, Mexico	11th (h)	100 m hurdles	13.92 s (+0.4 m/s)
2012	Central American Championships	Managua, Nicaragua	1st	100 m hurdles	13.99 s CR (-1.6 m/s)
2012	Ibero-American Championships	Barquisimeto, Venezuela	6th	100 m hurdles	14.10 s (+0.4 m/s)
2012	Olympic Games	London, United Kingdom	41st (h)	100 m hurdles	14.36 s (-0.7 m/s)
2013	Central American Games	San José, Costa Rica	5th	100 m	12.47 w (wind: +2.1 m/s)
2013	Central American Games	San José, Costa Rica	1st	100 m hurdles	14.42 s (wind: +1.9 m/s)
