= Tricia Flores =

Belizean track and field athlete

Personal information
- Full name: Tricia Minelia Flores
- Born: 29 December 1979 (age 46)
- Height: 1.70 m (5 ft 7 in)
- Weight: 60 kg (132 lb)

Sport
- Country: Belize
- Sport: Women's athletics
- Events: Sprint; Long jump
Medal record
Women's Athletics
Representing Belize
Central American Games
Gold medal – first place	2010 Panama City	Long jump
Bronze medal – third place	2001 Guatemala City	200 m
Bronze medal – third place	2001 Guatemala City	Long jump
Bronze medal – third place	2001 Guatemala City	4x100 m relay
Central American Championships
Gold medal – first place	2012 Managua	Long jump
Gold medal – first place	2011 San José	Long jump
Gold medal – first place	2011 San José	4x100 m relay
Gold medal – first place	2010 Guatemala City	Long jump
Gold medal – first place	2007 San José	Long jump
Gold medal – first place	2004 Managua	100 m
Gold medal – first place	2004 Managua	Long jump
Gold medal – first place	2004 Managua	Triple jump
Silver medal – second place	2011 San José	Triple jump
Silver medal – second place	2010 Guatemala City	100 m
Silver medal – second place	2010 Guatemala City	4x400 m relay
Silver medal – second place	2009 Guatemala City	Long jump
Silver medal – second place	2005 San José	100 m
Silver medal – second place	2005 San José	Long jump
Bronze medal – third place	2012 Managua	100 m
Bronze medal – third place	2011 San José	4x400 m relay
Bronze medal – third place	2010 Guatemala City	4x100 m relay
Bronze medal – third place	2007 San José	Triple jump
Bronze medal – third place	2005 San José	Triple jump
- Updated on 26 July 2014

Tricia Minelia Flores (born 29 December 21979) is a Belizean jumper and runner who has represented the University of Belize. She represented Belize internationally at the 2008 Summer Olympics in Beijing.

== Personal bests ==
- 100 m: 12.13 s (wind: +0.8 m/s) – San José, Costa Rica, 3 June 2005
- Long jump: 5.97 m (wind: -2.0 m/s) – Panama City, Panama, 16 April 2010
- Triple jump: 12.00 m (wind: +1.4 m/s) – San José, Costa Rica, 9 June 2007

== Achievements ==
Year	Competition	Venue	Position	Event	Notes
Representing Belize
1998	Commonwealth Games	Kuala Lumpur, Malaysia	22nd (h)	100 m	13.23
1998	Commonwealth Games	Kuala Lumpur, Malaysia	14th	Long jump	5.08m
2001	Central American Games	Guatemala City, Guatemala	3rd	100 m	12.33 A
2001	Central American Games	Guatemala City, Guatemala	3rd	Long jump	5.38m A
2001	Central American Games	Guatemala City, Guatemala	3rd	4 × 100 m relay	48.34 A
2002	Central American and Caribbean Games	San Salvador, El Salvador	7th	200m	26.36 (wind: 0.0 m/s)
2002	Central American and Caribbean Games	San Salvador, El Salvador	7th	Long jump	5.53 m (wind: -2.8 m/s)
2003	Pan American Games	Santo Domingo, Dominican Republic	10th	Long jump	4.90m
2003	World Championships	Paris, France	53rd (h)	100 m	13.89
2004	Central American Championships	Managua, Nicaragua	1st	100 m	12.49
2004	Central American Championships	Managua, Nicaragua	1st	Long jump	5.60m CR
2004	Central American Championships	Managua, Nicaragua	1st	Triple jump	11.96m
2005	Central American Championships	San José, Costa Rica	2nd	100 m	12.53 (-3.7 m/s)
2005	Central American Championships	San José, Costa Rica	2nd	Long jump	5.65m (-1.1 m/s)
2005	Central American Championships	San José, Costa Rica	3rd	Triple jump	11.88m (-0.4 m/s)
2005	Central American Championships	San José, Costa Rica	4th	4 × 100 m relay	49.06
2005	Central American Championships	San José, Costa Rica	4th	4 × 400 m relay	4:20.19
2005	World Championships	Helsinki, Finland	38th (h)	100 m	12.59
2006	Commonwealth Games	Melbourne, Australia	27th (h)	100 m	12.63
2006	Central American and Caribbean Games	Cartagena, Colombia	18th (h)	100 m	12.28
2006	Central American and Caribbean Games	Cartagena, Colombia	11th	Long jump	5.60m
2007	Central American Championships	San José, Costa Rica	1st	Long jump	5.86m CR
2007	Central American Championships	San José, Costa Rica	3rd	Triple jump	12.00m (+1.4 m/s)
2007	Central American Championships	San José, Costa Rica	5th	4 × 100 m relay	49.34
2007	NACAC Championships	San Salvador, El Salvador	5th	Long jump	5.96 m
2007	Pan American Games	Rio de Janeiro, Brazil	25th (h)	100 m	12.37
2007	Pan American Games	Rio de Janeiro, Brazil	12th	Long jump	5.60m
2008	Olympic Games	Beijing, China	38th (q)	Long jump	5.25m (+1.2 m/s)
2009	Central American Championships	Guatemala City, Guatemala	5th (h)	100 m	12.86 (wind: +0.6 m/s)
2009	Central American Championships	Guatemala City, Guatemala	2nd	Long jump	5.43m (+0.2 m/s)
2010	Central American Games	Panama City, Panama	4th	100 m	12.56 (wind: +0.2 m/s)
2010	Central American Games	Panama City, Panama	1st	Long jump	5.97m GR (-2.0 m/s)
2010	Central American and Caribbean Games	Mayagüez, Puerto Rico	12th	Long jump	5.78m
2010	Central American Championships	Guatemala City, Guatemala	2nd	100 m	12.72 (-2.7 m/s)
2010	Central American Championships	Guatemala City, Guatemala	7th	200 m	26.22 (NWI)
2010	Central American Championships	Guatemala City, Guatemala	1st	Long jump	5.89m
2010	Central American Championships	Guatemala City, Guatemala	3rd	4 × 100 m relay	50.75
2010	Central American Championships	Guatemala City, Guatemala	2nd	4 × 400 m relay	4:27.26
2011	Central American Championships	San José, Costa Rica	4th	100 m	12.31 (wind: -0.6 m/s)
2011	Central American Championships	San José, Costa Rica	1st	Long jump	5.85m (+1.0 m/s)
2011	Central American Championships	San José, Costa Rica	2nd	Triple jump	11.95m (+1.0 m/s)
2011	Central American Championships	San José, Costa Rica	1st	4 × 100 m relay	48.50
2011	Central American Championships	San José, Costa Rica	3rd	4 × 400 m relay	4:23.35
2011	Pan American Games	Guadalajara, Mexico	11th	Long jump	5.88m
2012	Central American Championships	Managua, Nicaragua	3rd	100m	12.34 (-0.6 m/s)
2012	Central American Championships	Managua, Nicaragua	1st	Long jump	5.67m
