= Gladys Landaverde =

Salvadoran middle-distance runner

Personal information
- Full name: Gladys Nataly Landaverde Hernández
- Born: 23 February 1990 (age 36) San Ignacio, Chalatenango, El Salvador
- Height: 1.62 m (5 ft 4 in)
- Weight: 61 kg (134 lb)

Sport
- Country: El Salvador
- Sport: Women's Athletics
- Event: Middle-distance running
Medal record
Women's Athletics
Representing El Salvador
Central American Games
Silver medal – second place	2013 San José	800 m
Silver medal – second place	2013 San José	1500 m
Bronze medal – third place	2010 Panama City	800 m
Bronze medal – third place	2010 Panama City	1500 m
Central American Championships
Gold medal – first place	2008 San Pedro Sula	1500 m
Gold medal – first place	2008 San Pedro Sula	4x400 m relay
Gold medal – first place	2009 Guatemala City	800 m
Gold medal – first place	2009 Guatemala City	500 m
Silver medal – second place	2007 San José	800 m
Silver medal – second place	2007 San José	1500 m
Silver medal – second place	2008 San Pedro Sula	800 m
Silver medal – second place	2009 Guatemala City	4x100 m relay
Silver medal – second place	2009 Guatemala City	4x400 m relay
Silver medal – second place	2011 San José	800 m
Silver medal – second place	2012 Managua	800 m
Silver medal – second place	2012 Managua	1500 m
CAC Junior Championships (U17)
Bronze medal – third place	2006 Port of Spain	800 m
Bronze medal – third place	2006 Port of Spain	1200 m
- Updated on 10 July 2014

Gladys Nataly Landaverde Hernández (born 23 February 1990) is a Salvadoran middle-distance runner. At the 2012 Summer Olympics, she competed in the Women's 1500 metres.

== Personal bests ==
=== Outdoor ===
- 800 m: 2:07.87 min – Managua, Nicaragua, 15 June 2012
- 1500 m: 4:18.26 min – London, United Kingdom, 6 August 2012

== Achievements ==
Year	Competition	Venue	Position	Event	Notes
Representing El Salvador
2004	Central American Junior Championships (U18)	San José, Costa Rica	2nd	3000 m	11:04.59
2004	Central American and Caribbean Junior Championships (U17)	Coatzacoalcos, Mexico	5th	1200 m	4:03.92
2006	Central American Junior Championships (U18)	Guatemala City, Guatemala	2nd	1500 m	4:50.09
2006	Central American and Caribbean Junior Championships (U-17)	Port of Spain, Trinidad and Tobago	3rd	800 m	2:13.86
2006	Central American and Caribbean Junior Championships (U-17)	Port of Spain, Trinidad and Tobago	3rd	1200 m	3:34.12
2007	Central American Junior Championships (U18)	San Salvador, El Salvador	2nd	800 m	2:13.44
2007	Central American Championships	San José, Costa Rica	2nd	800 m	2:13.02
2007	Central American Championships	San José, Costa Rica	2nd	1500 m	4:42.09
2007	World Youth Championships	Ostrava, Czech Republic	6th (h)	800 m	2:14.24
2008	Central American Championships	San Pedro Sula, Honduras	2nd	800 m	2:12.36
2008	Central American Championships	San Pedro Sula, Honduras	1st	1500 m	4:40.12
2008	Central American Championships	San Pedro Sula, Honduras	1st	4 × 400 m relay	4:07.92
2008	Central American and Caribbean Championships	Cali, Colombia	11th	800 m	2:15.4
2008	Central American and Caribbean Championships	Cali, Colombia	4th	1500 m	4:46.17
2008	Central American Junior Championships (U20)	San Salvador, El Salvador	1st	800 m	2:14.91
2008	Central American Junior Championships (U20)	San Salvador, El Salvador	1st	1500 m	4:50.94
2008	Central American Junior Championships (U20)	San Salvador, El Salvador	3rd	3000 m	10:43.44
2008	Central American Junior Championships (U20)	San Salvador, El Salvador	2nd	4 × 100 m relay	51.01
2008	Central American Junior Championships (U20)	San Salvador, El Salvador	2nd	4 × 400 m relay	4:01.95
2009	Central American Cross Country Championships (U20)	Orange Walk Town, Belize	3rd	6 km	26:21
2009	Central American Junior Championships (U20)	San Salvador, El Salvador	2nd	800 m	2:12.82
2009	Central American Junior Championships (U20)	San Salvador, El Salvador	2nd	1500 m	4:41.32
2009	Central American Junior Championships (U20)	San Salvador, El Salvador	2nd	4 × 100 m relay	51.06
2009	Central American Junior Championships (U20)	San Salvador, El Salvador	2nd	4 × 400 m relay	4:11.79
2009	Central American Championships	Guatemala City, Guatemala	1st	800 m	2:16.08
2009	Central American Championships	Guatemala City, Guatemala	1st	1500 m	4:49.12
2009	Central American Championships	Guatemala City, Guatemala	2nd	4 × 100 m relay	48.80
2009	Central American Championships	Guatemala City, Guatemala	2nd	4 × 400 m relay	3:55.99
2010	Central American Games	Panama City, Panama	3rd	800 m	2:12.04
2010	Central American Games	Panama City, Panama	3rd	1500 m	4:26.58
2010	Central American and Caribbean Games	Mayagüez, Puerto Rico	7th	1500 m	4:28.81
2010	Ibero-American Championships	San Fernando, Spain	10th	1500 m	4:28.19
2011	Central American Cross Country Championships	Tela, Honduras	2nd	8 km	35:19
2011	Central American Championships	San José, Costa Rica	2nd	800 m	2:18.75
2011	Central American and Caribbean Championships	Mayagüez, Puerto Rico	7th	1500 m	4:30.07
2011	Pan American Games	Guadalajara, Mexico	8th	1500 m	4:31.43
2011	World Championships	Daegu, South Korea	33rd	1500 m	4:28.50
2012	Ibero-American Championships	Barquisimeto, Venezuela	4th	1500 m	4:21.04 NR
2012	Central American Championships	Managua, Nicaragua	2nd	800 m	2.07.87
2012	Central American Championships	Managua, Nicaragua	2nd	1500 m	4.22.28
2012	NACAC U23 Championships	Irapuato, Mexico	6th	800m	2:11.57 A
2012	NACAC U23 Championships	Irapuato, Mexico	6th	1500m	4:44.85 A
2012	Olympic Games	London, United Kingdom	15th	1500 m	4:18.26 NR
2013	Central American Games	San José, Costa Rica	2nd	800 m	2:08.29
2013	Central American Games	San José, Costa Rica	2nd	1500 m	4:34.18
2013	Central American Championships	Managua, Nicaragua	1st	800 m	2:11.12
2013	Central American Championships	Managua, Nicaragua	1st	1500 m	4:31.49
2013	Central American and Caribbean Championships	Morelia, Mexico	6th	800 m	2:10.46
