= Rolando Palacios =

Honduran sprinter (born 1987)

Personal information
- Full name: Cruz Rolando Palacios Castillo
- Nationality: Honduras
- Born: May 3, 1987 (age 39) Sambo Creek, Atlántida, Honduras
- Height: 1.89 m (6 ft 2 in)
- Weight: 89 kg (196 lb)

Sport
- Sport: Men's Athletics
- Event: Sprint

Achievements and titles
- Personal best: 100m = 10.22 200m = 20.40
Medal record
Men's athletics
Representing Honduras
Central American and Caribbean Games
Gold medal – first place	2014 Xalapa	100 m
Ibero-American Championships
Silver medal – second place	2010 San Fernando	100 m
Bronze medal – third place	2014 São Paulo	200 m
Summer Universiade
Gold medal – first place	2009 Belgrade	100 m
Central American Games
Gold medal – first place	2006 Managua	100 m
Gold medal – first place	2006 Managua	200 m
Gold medal – first place	2006 Managua	4x100 m relay
Gold medal – first place	2010 Panama City	200 m
Gold medal – first place	2013 San José	100 m
Gold medal – first place	2013 San José	4x100 m relay
Silver medal – second place	2010 Panama City	100 m
Silver medal – second place	2013 San José	200 m
NACAC U-23 Championships
Silver medal – second place	2008 Toluca	200 m
Bronze medal – third place	2008 Toluca	100 m
Central American Championships
Gold medal – first place	2004 Managua	100 m
Gold medal – first place	2004 Managua	4x100 m relay
Gold medal – first place	2007 San José	100 m
Gold medal – first place	2007 San José	4x100 m relay
Gold medal – first place	2008 San Pedro Sula	100 m
Gold medal – first place	2008 San Pedro Sula	200 m
Gold medal – first place	2008 San Pedro Sula	4x100 m relay
Gold medal – first place	2009 Guatemala City	100 m
Gold medal – first place	2009 Guatemala City	200 m
Gold medal – first place	2009 Guatemala City	4x100 m relay
Gold medal – first place	2010 Guatemala City	100 m
Gold medal – first place	2010 Guatemala City	200 m
Gold medal – first place	2010 Guatemala City	4x100 m relay
Gold medal – first place	2010 Guatemala City	4x400 m relay
Gold medal – first place	2011 San José	100 m
Gold medal – first place	2011 San José	200 m
Gold medal – first place	2011 San José	4x100 m relay
Silver medal – second place	2004 Managua	200 m
- Updated on 10 December 2014

Cruz Rolando Palacios Castillo (born 3 May 1987) is a Honduran sprinter who specializes in the 100 metres and 200 metres. He was born in Sambo Creek, a traditional Garífuna village. His personal best time is 10.22 seconds, achieved in July 2008 in Toluca.

He competed at the 2005 World Championships, the 2006 World Indoor Championships, the 2008 World Indoor Championships and the 2008 Olympic Games. In Beijing, he finished fourth in his heat at the 100 metres with a time of 10.49 seconds but was eliminated. At the 200 metres, he placed third in his heat behind Roman Smirnov and Walter Dix to qualify for the next round in a time of 20.81 seconds. In the second round, he came to 20.87 seconds, the seventh time in his heat, not enough to advance to the next round.

He competed in the 200 m event at the 2016 Summer Olympics in Rio de Janeiro. He finished 7th in his heat with a time of 21.32 seconds and did not qualify for the semifinals. He was the flagbearer for Honduras during the Parade of Nations.

He set the 60 metres Honduran national record with a time of 6.62 seconds on 26 February 2009.

== Personal bests ==
- 100 m: 10.22 s (wind: +0.3 m/s) – Toluca, 18 July 2008
- 200 m: 20.40 s (wind: -0.9 m/s) – Toluca, 22 July 2008
- 400 m: 47.64 s – Kingston, 12 February 2011

== Major competitions record ==
Year	Competition	Venue	Position	Event	Notes
Representing Honduras
2004	Central American Junior Championships	San José, Costa Rica	5th	100 m	11.17 (-1.0 m/s)
2004	Central American Junior Championships	San José, Costa Rica	5th	200 m	23.05 (-2.3 m/s)
2004	Central American Junior Championships	San José, Costa Rica	7th	400 m	58.44
2004	Central American and Caribbean Junior Championships	Coatzacoalcos, Mexico	6th (h)	100 m	11.05 w (+3.3 m/s)
2004	Central American and Caribbean Junior Championships	Coatzacoalcos, Mexico	5th (h)	200 m	22.58 w (+4.4 m/s)
2004	Central American Championships	Managua, Nicaragua	1st	100 m	10.84 (-0.6 m/s)
2004	Central American Championships	Managua, Nicaragua	2nd	200 m	21.89
2004	Central American Championships	Managua, Nicaragua	1st	4 × 100 m	41.71
2005	World Championships	Helsinki, Finland	38th (h)	100 m	10.73 NR
2006	Central American Games	Managua, Nicaragua	1st	100 m	10.60
2006	Central American Games	Managua, Nicaragua	1st	200 m	21.22 NR
2006	Central American Games	Managua, Nicaragua	1st	4 × 100 m	41.63 NR
2006	World Indoor Championships	Moscow, Russia	32nd (h)	60 m	6.80
2006	Central American Junior Championships	Guatemala City, Guatemala	1st	100 m	10.68 (-0.7 m/s)
2006	Central American Junior Championships	Guatemala City, Guatemala	2nd	200 m	21.41 (+0.7 m/s)
2006	Central American Junior Championships	Guatemala City, Guatemala	1st	4 × 100 m relay	42.74
2006	Central American and Caribbean Junior Championships	Port of Spain, Trinidad and Tobago	4th	100 m	10.56 (+1.5 m/s)
2006	Central American and Caribbean Junior Championships	Port of Spain, Trinidad and Tobago	6th	200 m	21.47 (+1.4 m/s)
2006	Central American and Caribbean Games	Cartagena, Colombia	20th (h)	100 m	10.73 (-0.8 m/s)
2006	Central American and Caribbean Games	Cartagena, Colombia	16th (sf)	200 m	21.36 (-0.1 m/s)
2007	ALBA Games	Caracas, Venezuela	4th (h)	100 m	10.81 (+0.3 m/s)
2007	Central American Championships	San José, Costa Rica	1st	100 m	10.65 (+0.5 m/s)
2007	Central American Championships	San José, Costa Rica	1st	4 × 100 m	41.07
2007	NACAC Championships	San Salvador, El Salvador	4th	100 m	10.51 (+0.8 m/s)
2007	NACAC Championships	San Salvador, El Salvador	7th	200 m	21.26 (+1.8 m/s)
2007	Pan American Games	Rio de Janeiro, Brazil	14th (sf)	100 m	10.48 (-0.5 m/s)
2007	Pan American Games	Rio de Janeiro, Brazil	18th (h)	200 m	21.27 (+0.5 m/s)
2007	Pan American Games	Rio de Janeiro, Brazil	10th (h)	4 × 100 m	41.49
2008	World Indoor Championships	Valencia, Spain	3rd (h)	60 m	6.83
2008	Ibero-American Championships	Iquique, Chile	4th	100 m	10.63 (-2.3 m/s)
2008	Ibero-American Championships	Iquique, Chile	4th	200 m	21.16 (-0.5 m/s)
2008	Central American Championships	San Pedro Sula, Honduras	1st	100 m	10.61 (-0.2 m/s)
2008	Central American Championships	San Pedro Sula, Honduras	1st	200 m	21.25 (-0.1 m/s)
2008	Central American Championships	San Pedro Sula, Honduras	1st	4 × 100 m	41.10
2008	Central American and Caribbean Championships	Cali, Colombia	8th (sf)	100 m	10.37 NR (+0.7 m/s)
2008	Central American and Caribbean Championships	Cali, Colombia	8th	200 m	21.09 (+0.5 m/s)
2008	NACAC Under-23 Championships	Toluca, Mexico	3rd	100 m	10.22 A NR (+0.3 m/s)
2008	NACAC Under-23 Championships	Toluca, Mexico	2nd	200 m	20.40 A NR (-0.9 m/s)
2008	Olympic Games	Beijing, China	43rd (h)	100 m	10.49 (-1.7 m/s)
2008	Olympic Games	Beijing, China	26th (qf)	200 m	20.87 (+0.1 m/s)
2009	Central American Championships	Guatemala City, Guatemala	1st	100 m	10.38 (NWI)
2009	Central American Championships	Guatemala City, Guatemala	1st	200 m	20.99 CR (NWI)
2009	Central American Championships	Guatemala City, Guatemala	1st	4 × 100 m	41.03 CR
2009	Universiade	Belgrade, Serbia	1st	100 m	10.30 (-0.7 m/s)
2009	Universiade	Belgrade, Serbia	4th	200 m	20.78 (+0.1 m/s)
2009	World Championships	Berlin, Germany	23rd (qf)	100 m	10.24 (+0.1 m/s)
2009	World Championships	Berlin, Germany	14th (sf)	200 m	20.67 (0.0 m/s)
2010	Central American Games	Panama City, Panama	2nd	100 m	10.36 (-0.2 m/s)
2010	Central American Games	Panama City, Panama	1st	200 m	20.84 GR (+0.1 m/s)
2010	Ibero-American Championships	San Fernando, Spain	10th	100 m	10.61 (-0.8 m/s)
2010	Ibero-American Championships	San Fernando, Spain	2nd	200 m	21.20 (+0.2 m/s)
2010	Central American and Caribbean Games	Mayagüez, Puerto Rico	6th	100 m	10.31 (+0.2 m/s)
2010	Central American and Caribbean Games	Mayagüez, Puerto Rico	5th	200 m	20.67 (0.0 m/s)
2010	Central American and Caribbean Games	Mayagüez, Puerto Rico	9th (h)	4 × 100 m	41.69
2010	Central American Championships	Guatemala City, Guatemala	1st	100 m	10.73
2010	Central American Championships	Guatemala City, Guatemala	1st	200 m	21.92 (-2.2 m/s)
2010	Central American Championships	Guatemala City, Guatemala	1st	4 × 100 m	42.02
2010	Central American Championships	Guatemala City, Guatemala	1st	4 × 400 m	3:20.84
2011	Central American Championships	San José, Costa Rica	1st	100 m	10.57 (-0.7 m/s)
2011	Central American Championships	San José, Costa Rica	1st	200 m	20.97 CR (-0.5 m/s)
2011	Central American Championships	San José, Costa Rica	1st	4 × 100 m	40.83 CR
2011	World Championships	Daegu, South Korea	44th (h)	200 m	21.22 (-1.1 m/s)
2011	Pan American Games	Guadalajara, Mexico	18th (h)	100 m	10.49 (-1.0 m/s)
2011	Pan American Games	Guadalajara, Mexico	5th	200 m	20.77 (-1.0 m/s)
2013	Central American Games	San José, Costa Rica	1st	100 m	10.48 (-1.5 m/s)
2013	Central American Games	San José, Costa Rica	2nd	200 m	20.63 w (+2.1 m/s)
2013	Central American Games	San José, Costa Rica	1st	4 × 100 m relay	41.61
2013	Central American Championships	Managua, Nicaragua	1st	100 m	10.57 (-1.6 m/s)
2013	Central American Championships	Managua, Nicaragua	1st	200 m	21.20 w (+2.7 m/s)
2013	Central American and Caribbean Championships	Morelia, Mexico	9th (h)	100 m	10.24 w (+3.0 m/s)
2013	Central American and Caribbean Championships	Morelia, Mexico	14th (h)	200 m	21.22 (-0.1 m/s)
2013	World Championships	Moscow, Russia	36th (h)	200 m	21.02 (-0.6 m/s)
2014	World Indoor Championships	Sopot, Poland	32nd (h)	60 m	6.78
2014	Central American Championships	Tegucigalpa, Honduras	1st	100 m	10.27 w (+2.6 m/s)
2014	Central American Championships	Tegucigalpa, Honduras	1st	200 m	20.81 (+0.6 m/s)
2014	Central American Championships	Tegucigalpa, Honduras	1st	4 × 100 m relay	41.50
2014	Ibero-American Championships	São Paulo, Brazil	4th	100 m	10.34 (+0.6 m/s)
2014	Ibero-American Championships	São Paulo, Brazil	3rd	200 m	20.60 (+0.7 m/s)
2014	Pan American Sports Festival	Mexico City, Mexico	4th	100m	10.39 A (-1.3 m/s)
2014	Pan American Sports Festival	Mexico City, Mexico	7th	200m	20.50 A (+0.6 m/s)
2014	Central American and Caribbean Games	Xalapa, Mexico	1st	100m	10.27 A (+0.9 m/s)
2014	Central American and Caribbean Games	Xalapa, Mexico	4th	200m	20.76 A (-1.8 m/s)
2015	NACAC Championships	San José, Costa Rica	6th (sf)	100m	10.31 w (+2.7 m/s)
2015	NACAC Championships	San José, Costa Rica	3rd (h)	200m	20.72 w (+3.5 m/s)
2015	World Championships	Beijing, China	—	200 m	DSQ
2016	World Indoor Championships	Portland, United States	37th (h)	60 m	6.81
2016	Ibero-American Championships	Rio de Janeiro, Brazil	11th (sf)	100 m	10.46
2016	Ibero-American Championships	Rio de Janeiro, Brazil	8th (sf)	200 m	20.97
2016	Olympic Games	Rio de Janeiro, Brazil	71st (h)	200 m	21.32
2017	World Championships	London, United Kingdom	15th (p)	100 m	10.73

Olympic Games
Preceded by Ronald Bennett	Flag bearer for Honduras; Rio 2026	Succeeded by Keyla Ávila; Julio Horrego
