= Jessica Aguilera =

Nicaraguan track and field athlete

Jéssica Aguilera
Personal information
- Full name: Jéssica Carolina Aguilera Aguilera
- Born: June 26, 1985 (age 40) Somoto, Madriz, Nicaragua
- Height: 1.67 m (5 ft 5 1/2 in)
- Weight: 57 kg (126 lb)

Sport
- Country: Nicaragua
- Sport: Women's Athletics
- Event(s): Hurdling, Sprint
Medal record
Women's Athletics
Representing Nicaragua
Central American Games
Gold medal – first place	2006 Managua	400 m
Gold medal – first place	2006 Managua	400 m hurdles
Gold medal – first place	2006 Managua	4x100 m relay
Gold medal – first place	2006 Managua	4x400 m relay
Silver medal – second place	2010 Panama City	400 m hurdles
Silver medal – second place	2010 Panama City	4x400 m relay
Bronze medal – third place	2010 Panama City	4x100 m relay
Central American Championships
Gold medal – first place	2012 Managua	400 m hurdles
Silver medal – second place	2005 San José	4x100 m relay
Silver medal – second place	2005 San José	4x400 m relay
Silver medal – second place	2008 San Pedro Sula	400 m hurdles
Silver medal – second place	2008 San Pedro Sula	4x400 m relay
Silver medal – second place	2011 San José	400 m hurdles
Silver medal – second place	2012 Managua	4x400 m relay
Bronze medal – third place	2004 Managua	4x400 m relay
Bronze medal – third place	2005 San José	400 m hurdles
Bronze medal – third place	2008 San Pedro Sula	400 m
Bronze medal – third place	2008 San Pedro Sula	4x100 m relay
Bronze medal – third place	2009 Guatemala City	400 m
- Updated on 26 July 2014

Jéssica Carolina Aguilera Aguilera (born 26 June 1985) is a Nicaraguan track and field sprint athlete.

== Olympics ==
Aguilera represented Nicaragua at the 2008 Summer Olympics in Beijing. She competed at the 100 metres sprint and placed eighth in her heat without advancing to the second round. She ran the distance in a time of 13.15 seconds.

== Personal bests ==
- 100 m: 13.15 s (wind: -0.9 m/s) – Beijing, China, 16 August 2008
- 400 m hurdles: 62.74 s NR – Managua, Nicaragua, 18 February 2006

== Achievements ==
Year	Competition	Venue	Position	Event	Notes
Representing Nicaragua
2003	Central American Championships	Guatemala City, Guatemala	8th	200 m	27.83 w (wind: +2.7 m/s)
2003	Central American Championships	Guatemala City, Guatemala	5th	400 m hurdles	1:16.50
2003	Central American Championships	Guatemala City, Guatemala	4th	4 × 100 m relay	51.99
2003	Central American Championships	Guatemala City, Guatemala	4th	4 × 400 m relay	4:08.15
2003	Central American Junior Championships (U20)	San José, Costa Rica	8th	100 m	13.42
2003	Central American Junior Championships (U20)	San José, Costa Rica	6th	200 m	27.20
2004	Central American Junior Championships	San José, Costa Rica	6th	100 m hurdles	19.98 (wind: -1.5 m/s)
2004	Central American Championships	Managua, Nicaragua	5th	200 m	26.28
2004	Central American Championships	Managua, Nicaragua	—	4 × 100 m relay	DNF
2004	Central American Championships	Managua, Nicaragua	3rd	4 × 400 m relay	4:03.10
2005	Central American Championships	San José, Costa Rica	5th	200 m	25.96 (wind: -1.5 m/s)
2005	Central American Championships	San José, Costa Rica	3rd	400 m hurdles	65.28
2005	Central American Championships	San José, Costa Rica	2nd	4 × 100 m relay	48.87
2005	Central American Championships	San José, Costa Rica	2nd	4 × 400 m relay	3:56.81
2005	World Championships	Helsinki, Finland	6th (h)	400 m hurdles	64.43 PB
2006	Central American Games	Managua, Nicaragua	1st	400 m	58.78
2006	Central American Games	Managua, Nicaragua	1st	400 m hurdles	65.69
2006	Central American Games	Managua, Nicaragua	1st	4 × 100 m relay	49.13
2006	Central American Games	Managua, Nicaragua	1st	4 × 400 m relay	4:02.50
2007	ALBA Games	Caracas, Venezuela	6th	400 m hurdles	69.53
2008	Central American Championships	San Pedro Sula, Honduras	3rd	400 m	59.76
2008	Central American Championships	San Pedro Sula, Honduras	2nd	400 m hurdles	65.97
2008	Central American Championships	San Pedro Sula, Honduras	3rd	4 × 100 m relay	51.84
2008	Central American Championships	San Pedro Sula, Honduras	2nd	4 × 400 m relay	4:22.45
2008	Central American and Caribbean Championships	Cali, Colombia	22nd (h)	400 m	59.18
2008	Central American and Caribbean Championships	Cali, Colombia	5th	400 m hurdles	63.00
2008	Olympic Games	Beijing, China	72nd (h)	100 m	13.15
2009	Central American Championships	Guatemala City, Guatemala	5th (h)	200 m	26.28 (wind: +0.7 m/s)
2009	Central American Championships	Guatemala City, Guatemala	3rd	400 m	58.25
2010	Central American Games	Panama City, Panama	2nd	400 m hurdles	63.63
2010	Central American Games	Panama City, Panama	3rd	4 × 100 m relay	49.20
2010	Central American Games	Panama City, Panama	2nd	4 × 400 m relay	3:52.49
2010	Central American and Caribbean Games	Mayagüez, Puerto Rico	8th (h)	400 m hurdles	65.54
2011	Central American Championships	San José, Costa Rica	4th	400 m	59.84
2011	Central American Championships	San José, Costa Rica	2nd	400 m hurdles	64.11
2011	ALBA Games	Barquisimeto, Venezuela	2nd	400 m hurdles	62.83 s
2011	Pan American Games	Guadalajara, Mexico	13th (h)	400 m hurdles	63.75
2011	World Championships	Daegu, South Korea	37th (h)	400 m hurdles	62.78
2012	Central American Championships	Managua, Nicaragua	7th	200 m	25.74 (wind: +1.5 m/s)
2012	Central American Championships	Managua, Nicaragua	6th	400 m	58.09
2012	Central American Championships	Managua, Nicaragua	1st	400 m hurdles	63.66
2012	Central American Championships	Managua, Nicaragua	4th	4 × 100 m relay	50.38
2012	Central American Championships	Managua, Nicaragua	2nd	4 × 400 m relay	4.00.46
