= Rigoberto Calderón =

Nicaraguan javelin thrower (born 1970)

Personal information
- Born: 21 April 1970 (age 56)

Sport
- Sport: Track and field
Medal record
Representing Nicaragua
Central American Games
Gold medal – first place	1990 Tegucigalpa	Javelin throw
Gold medal – first place	1994 San Salvador	Javelin throw
Gold medal – first place	1997 San Pedro Sula	Javelin throw
Gold medal – first place	2001 Guatemala City	Javelin throw
Gold medal – first place	2006 Managua	Javelin throw
Gold medal – first place	2010 Panama City	Javelin throw
Bronze medal – third place	2013 San Jose	Javelin throw
NACAC Championships
Bronze medal – third place	2007 San Salvador	Javelin throw
CAC Championships
Silver medal – second place	2001 Guatemala City	Javelin throw
Silver medal – second place	2003 St. George's	Javelin throw

Rigoberto Calderón (born 21 April 1970) is a Nicaraguan former track and field athlete who competed in the javelin throw. His personal best was 71.62 m (234 ft 11 1/2 in), set in 1997. He represented his country at the 1997 World Championships in Athletics.

He was twice a silver medallist at the Central American and Caribbean Championships in Athletics, finishing behind Manuel Fuenmayor both times. He was also a bronze medallist at the inaugural 2007 NACAC Championships in Athletics.

He competed for Nicaragua at the 1995 Summer Universiade, 2003 Pan American Games, two editions of the Central American and Caribbean Games, and five editions of the Ibero-American Championships in Athletics. Calderón was highly successful at regional level, taking six consecutive gold medals at the Central American Games from 1990 to 2010 and setting a Games record of 71.00 m. He was also four-time champion at the Central American Championships in Athletics.

== International competitions ==
Year	Competition	Venue	Position	Notes
1990	Central American Games	Tegucigalpa, Honduras	1st	64.84 m
1990	CAC Games	Mexico City, Mexico	10th	59.24 m
1991	Pan American Games	Havana, Cuba	15th	59.62 m
1991	Central American Championships	Tegucigalpa, Honduras	1st	64.68 m
1992	Ibero-American Championships	Seville, Spain	14th	61.08 m
1993	CAC Games	Ponce, Puerto Rico	5th	63.72 m
1994	Central American Games	San Salvador, El Salvador	1st	68.14 m
1994	Ibero-American Championships	Mar del Plata, Argentina	8th	65.14 m
1995	Pan American Games	Mar del Plata, Argentina	7th	69.58 m
1995	Universiade	Fukuoka, Japan	21st (q)	62.48 m
1997	Central American Games	San Pedro Sula, Honduras	1st	71.00 m
1997	World Championships	Athens, Greece	20th (q)	67.92 m
1998	CAC Games	Maracaibo, Venezuela	6th	69.41 m
2001	Central American Games	Guatemala City, Guatemala	1st	68.69 m
2001	CAC Championships	Guatemala City, Guatemala	2nd	67.00 m
2002	Ibero-American Championships	Guatemala City, Guatemala	8th	66.05 m
2003	Central American Championships	Guatemala City, Guatemala	1st	68.14 m
2003	CAC Championships	St. George's, Grenada	2nd	67.50 m
2003	Pan American Games	Santo Domingo, Dominican Republic	10th	66.98 m
2004	Central American Championships	Managua, Nicaragua	1st	70.29 m CR
2004	Ibero-American Championships	Huelva, Spain	10th	60.16 m
2005	Central American Championships	San José, Costa Rica	2nd	62.19 m
2006	Central American Games	Managua, Nicaragua	1st	66.64 m
2006	CAC Games	Cartagena, Colombia	4th	65.91 m
2006	Ibero-American Championships	Ponce, Puerto Rico	7th	66.93 m
2007	Central American Championships	San José, Costa Rica	1st	65.87 m
2007	NACAC Championships	San Salvador, El Salvador	3rd	66.50 m
2008	Central American Championships	San Pedro Sula, Honduras	2nd	60.74 m
2009	Central American Championships	Guatemala City, Guatemala	1st	65.42 m
2009	CAC Championships	Havana, Cuba	8th	64.76 m
2010	Central American Games	Panama City, Panama	1st	61.91 m
2010	CAC Games	Mayagüez, Puerto Rico	9th	63.34 m
2013	Central American Games	San José, Costa Rica	3rd	60.20 m
