= Ronald Bennett (athlete) =

Honduran hurdler

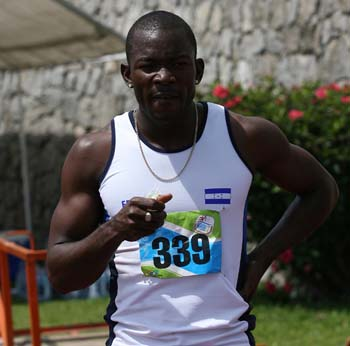

Personal information
- Full name: Ronald Roosevelt Bennett Martínez
- Born: October 11, 1984 (age 41) La Ceiba, Atlántida, Honduras
- Height: 1.75 m (5 ft 9 in)
- Weight: 70 kg (150 lb)

Sport
- Country: Honduras
- Sport: Men's athletics
- Events: Hurdling, Sprint
Medal record
Men's Athletics
Representing Honduras
Central American Games
Gold medal – first place	2006 Managua	4x100 m relay
Gold medal – first place	2010 Panama City	110 m hurdles
Gold medal – first place	2013 San José	110 m hurdles
Gold medal – first place	2013 San José	4x100 m relay
Central American Championships
Gold medal – first place	2012 Managua	110 m hurdles
Gold medal – first place	2011 San José	110 m hurdles
Gold medal – first place	2011 San José	4x100 m relay
Gold medal – first place	2010 Guatemala City	110 m hurdles
Gold medal – first place	2010 Guatemala City	4x100 m relay
Gold medal – first place	2010 Guatemala City	4x400 m relay
Gold medal – first place	2009 Guatemala City	110 m hurdles
Gold medal – first place	2009 Guatemala City	4x100 m relay
Gold medal – first place	2008 San Pedro Sula	110 m hurdles
Gold medal – first place	2008 San Pedro Sula	4x100 m relay
Gold medal – first place	2007 San José	110 m hurdles
Gold medal – first place	2007 San José	4x100 m relay
Gold medal – first place	2005 San José	4x100 m relay
Gold medal – first place	2004 Managua	4x100 m relay
Silver medal – second place	2005 San José	110 m hurdles
Silver medal – second place	2004 Managua	110 m hurdles
Bronze medal – third place	2012 Managua	4x100 m relay
- Updated on 25 July 2014

Ronald Roosevelt Bennett Martínez (born 11 October 1984) is a Honduran runner. He competed in the 110 metres hurdles event at the 2012 Summer Olympics. He was the flag bearer of Honduras during the opening ceremony.

== Personal bests ==
- 110 m hurdles: 13.80 s (wind: +1.0 m/s) – Belgrade, Serbia 10 July 2009

== Achievements ==
Year	Competition	Venue	Position	Event	Notes
Representing Honduras
2003	Central American Junior Championships	San José, Costa Rica	3rd	Javelin throw	41.26 m
2004	Central American and Caribbean Junior Championships	Coatzacoalcos, Mexico	6th	110 m hurdles	15.52 w (wind: +3.9 m/s)
2004	Central American Championships	Managua, Nicaragua	2nd	110 m hurdles	15.15
2004	Central American Championships	Managua, Nicaragua	1st	4 × 100 m relay	41.71
2005	Central American Championships	San José, Costa Rica	2nd	110 m hurdles	15.07 (-1.7 m/s)
2005	Central American Championships	San José, Costa Rica	1st	4 × 100 m relay	42.18
2006	Central American Games	Managua, Nicaragua	1st	4 × 100 m relay	41.63 NR
2006	NACAC U-23 Championships	Santo Domingo, Dominican Republic	7th	110 m hurdles	14.61 (wind: +1.1 m/s)
2006	Central American and Caribbean Games	Cartagena, Colombia	9th (h)	110 m hurdles	14.31 (+2.1 m/s)
2006	Central American and Caribbean Games	Cartagena, Colombia	9th (h)	4 × 100 m relay	41.47 NR
2007	ALBA Games	Caracas, Venezuela	4th	110 m hurdles	14.51 (wind: +0.6 m/s)
2007	Central American Championships	San José, Costa Rica	1st	110 m hurdles	14.15 CR (+1.1 m/s)
2007	Central American Championships	San José, Costa Rica	1st	4 × 100 m relay	41.07 CR
2007	NACAC Championships	San Salvador, El Salvador	9th (h)	110m hurdles	14.47 (+0.3 m/s)
2007	Pan American Games	Rio de Janeiro, Brazil	17th (h)	110m hurdles	14.47 (+0.4 m/s)
2007	Pan American Games	Rio de Janeiro, Brazil	10th (h)	4 × 100 m relay	41.49
2008	Ibero-American Championships	Iquique, Chile	8th (h)	110m hurdles	14.87 (-1.3 m/s)
2008	Central American Championships	San Pedro Sula, Honduras	1st	110 m hurdles	14.35 (+1.0 m/s)
2008	Central American Championships	San Pedro Sula, Honduras	1st	4 × 100 m relay	41.10
2008	Central American and Caribbean Championships	Cali, Colombia	10th (h)	110m hurdles	14.12 (-0.5 m/s)
2009	Central American Championships	Guatemala City, Guatemala	1st	110 m hurdles	14.14 CR (-0.4 m/s)
2009	Central American Championships	Guatemala City, Guatemala	1st	4 × 100 m relay	41.03 CR
2009	Universiade	Belgrade, Serbia	8th	110m hurdles	14.06 (+0.8 m/s)
2010	Central American Games	Panama City, Panama	1st	110 m hurdles	14.15 GR (0.0 m/s)
2010	Ibero-American Championships	San Fernando, Spain	9th	110 m hurdles	14.36 (wind: -0.7 m/s)
2010	Central American and Caribbean Games	Mayagüez, Puerto Rico	—	110m hurdles	DQ
2010	Central American Championships	Guatemala City, Guatemala	1st	110 m hurdles	14.58 (-2.1 m/s)
2010	Central American Championships	Guatemala City, Guatemala	1st	4 × 100 m relay	42.02
2010	Central American Championships	Guatemala City, Guatemala	1st	4 × 400 m relay	3:20.84
2011	Central American Championships	San José, Costa Rica	1st	110 m hurdles	14.05 CR (+0.4 m/s)
2011	Central American Championships	San José, Costa Rica	1st	4 × 100 m relay	40.83 CR
2011	Central American and Caribbean Championships	Mayagüez, Puerto Rico	11th (h)	110m hurdles	14.39 (-3.5 m/s)
2011	Universiade	Shenzhen, China	15th (sf)	110m hurdles	14.06 (+0.2 m/s)
2011	Pan American Games	Guadalajara, Mexico	11th (sf)	110m hurdles	13.81 (+1.8 m/s)
2011	Pan American Games	Guadalajara, Mexico	—	4 × 100 m relay	DNF
2012	Central American Championships	Managua, Nicaragua	1st	110 m hurdles	13.82 CR (+1.2 m/s)
2012	Central American Championships	Managua, Nicaragua	3rd	4 × 100 m relay	42.51
2012	Ibero-American Championships	Barquisimeto, Venezuela	6th	110m hurdles	14.00 (+1.0 m/s)
2012	Olympic Games	London, United Kingdom	44th (h)	110m hurdles	14.45 (+0.7 m/s)
2013	Central American Games	San José, Costa Rica	1st	110 m hurdles	14.43 (wind: +2.0 m/s)
2013	Central American Games	San José, Costa Rica	1st	4 × 100 m relay	41.61
2013	Central American Championships	Managua, Nicaragua	1st	110 m hurdles	14.51 (wind: -3.4 m/s)
2013	Central American and Caribbean Championships	Morelia, Mexico	11th (h)	110m hurdles	14.32 (-3.4 m/s)
2014	Central American Championships	Tegucigalpa, Honduras	1st	110 m hurdles	14.50 (wind: +0.0 m/s)
2014	Central American Championships	Tegucigalpa, Honduras	1st	4 × 100 m relay	41.50

Olympic Games
Preceded by Miguel Ferrera	Flag bearer for Honduras; London 2012	Succeeded by Rolando Palacios
