= 2004 Central American Championships in Athletics =

XVI Central American Championships in Athletics
- Dates: September 25–26
- Host city: Managua, Nicaragua
- Venue: Estadio de Atletismo del Instituto Nicaragüense de Deportes
- Level: Senior
- Events: 42 (22 men, 20 women)
- Participation: 183 athletes from 7 nations
- Records set: 9 championships records

The 16th Central American Championships in Athletics were held at the Estadio de Atletismo del Instituto Nicaragüense de Deportes in Managua, Nicaragua, between September 25–26, 2004.

A total of 42 events were contested, 22 by men and 20 by women.

== Records ==
A total of 9 championships records were set.

== Medal summary ==
Complete results and medal winners were published.

=== Men ===
Event	Gold		Silver		Bronze	
100 metres (wind: -0.6 m/s)	Rolando Cruz Palacios (HON)	10.84	Josell Ramírez (CRC)	10.90	Denis Gutiérrez (NCA)	11.10
200 metres (wind: m/s)	Josell Ramírez (CRC)	21.81	Rolando Cruz Palacios (HON)	21.89	Alex Geovany Navas (HON)	22.13
400 metres	Nery Brenes (CRC)	47.91	Jonnie Lowe (HON)	48.16	Takeshi Fujiwara (ESA)	48.53
800 metres	Carmen Daniel Hernández (NCA)	1:55.90	Marco Pérez (CRC)	1:56.09	Francis Jiménez (ESA)	1:56.19
1500 metres	José Francisco Chávez (CRC)	3:58.25	Francis Jiménez (ESA)	4:01.29	Carmen Daniel Hernández (NCA)	4:03.62
5000 metres	Francisco Gómez Vega (CRC)	14:49.59	William Salinas (ESA)	15:15.33	César Lizano (CRC)	15:38.89
10,000 metres	William Salinas (ESA)	32:13.01	César Lizano (CRC)	32:21.10	Andrés Rizo (CRC)	32:25.04
110 metres hurdles (wind: m/s)	Sadros Sánchez (PAN)	14.89	Ronald Bennett (HON)	15.15	David Umaña (CRC)	15.30
400 metres hurdles	Jonathan Gibson (PAN)	52.00 CR	Roberto Cortés (ESA)	52.74	Camilo Quevedo (GUA)	55.06
3000 metres steeplechase	Francisco Gómez Vega (CRC)	9:33.84	Marlon Monterrosa (ESA)	9:50.92	Francisco Salvador Romero (ESA)	9:53.39
4 x 100 metres relay	Honduras; Rolando Cruz Palacios; Jonnie Lowe; Ronald Bennett; Alex Geovany Navas	41.71	Costa Rica; Víctor Cantillano; Antonio Ramírez; Ronny Arroyo; Josell Ramírez	41.97	Nicaragua; Ramiro Sandoval; Jorge Conde; Jimmy Galeano; Denis Gutiérrez	42.22
4 x 400 metres relay	Costa Rica; Víctor Cantillano; Greivin González; Marco Pérez; Nery Brenes	3:16.80 CR	El Salvador; Rafael Antonio Galdámez; Takeshi Fujiwara; Francis Jiménez; Roberto Cortés	3:21.98	Nicaragua; Roberto Delgadillo; Léster Ponce; Ramiro Sandoval; José Tomás Traña	3:30.77
20 Kilometres Walk	Allan Segura (CRC)	1:31:51.30 CR	Salvador Ernesto Mira (ESA)	1:32:33.66	Julio René Martínez (GUA)	1:33:20.46
High jump	Octavius Gillespie (GUA)	2.08 CR	Henry Linton (CRC)	2.05	Anselmo Delgado (PAN)	1.99
Pole vault	Marco Josué Mira (ESA)	4.05				
Long jump	Henry Linton (CRC)	6.83	Jonathan Romero (PAN)	6.77	Yehefry Vides (ESA)	6.54
Triple jump	Juan Carlos Nájera (GUA)	15.15	Ulises Peña (NCA)	14.46	Henry Linton (CRC)	13.87
Shot put	Edson Monzón (GUA)	14.52	Ariel Rodríguez (CRC)	14.36	Roberto Sawyers (CRC)	13.55
Discus throw	Nelson Chavarría (CRC)	43.76	Luis Carlos Puerto (HON)	40.39	Roberto Sawyers (CRC)	39.15
Hammer throw	Raúl Rivera (GUA)	56.66	Roberto Sawyers (CRC)	47.20	Nelson Chavarría (CRC)	43.09
Javelin Throw	Rigoberto Calderón (NCA)	70.29 CR	Javier Ugarte (NCA)	67.61		
Decathlon	Yehefry Vides (ESA)	5514	Darwin Colón (HON)	5476		

=== Women ===
Event	Gold		Silver		Bronze	
100 metres	Tricia Flores (BIZ)	12.49	Kaina Arzu (BIZ)	12.59	Jeimy Bernárdez (HON)	12.60
200 metres	Melissa Moraga (CRC)	25.50	Kaina Arzu (BIZ)	25.59	Verónica Quijano (ESA)	25.73
400 metres	Verónica Quijano (ESA)	56.49	Melissa Moraga (CRC)	57.02	Wendy Zúñiga (CRC)	58.91
800 metres	Wendy Zúñiga (CRC)	2:14.52	Jéssica Bautista (ESA)	2:15.98	Yeimy Navarro (CRC)	2:16.96
1500 metres	Gabriela Traña (CRC)	4:35.11 CR	Yeimy Navarro (CRC)	4:48.45	Andrea Ferris (PAN)	4:58.27
5000 metres	Elsa Monterroso (GUA)	18:00.62	Yeimy Navarro (CRC)	18:54.48	Guadalupe Zúñiga (CRC)	19:14.84
10,000 metres	Gabriela Traña (CRC)	36:10.54 CR	Elsa Monterroso (GUA)	36:23.42	Guadalupe Zúñiga (CRC)	38:43.90
100 metres hurdles (wind: m/s)	Jeimy Bernárdez (HON)	15.06	Alejandra Lobo (CRC)	15.88	Hazel Traña (NCA)	17.91
400 metres hurdles	Verónica Quijano (ESA)	62.18	Isabel Restrepo (PAN)	67.65	Karla María Cortez (ESA)	69.97
4 x 100 metres relay	Costa Rica; Melissa Moraga; Sharon Ruiz; Tracy Joseph; María Gabriela Espinoza	50.30	El Salvador; María Gabriela Carrillo; Gladys Quijada; Amada Martínez; Karla María Cortez	51.48		
4 x 400 metres relay	El Salvador; Verónica Quijano; Amada Martínez; Jéssica Bautista; Karla María Cortez	3:58.02	Costa Rica; Tracy Joseph; Melissa Moraga; Wendy Zúñiga; María Gabriela Espinoza	4:01.03	Nicaragua; Jéssica Aguilera; Auxiliadora Lacayo; Yubelkis Casco; Belén Corrales	4:03.10
10,000 metres Walk	Ivis Martínez (ESA)	54:39.30	Carolyn Hernández (CRC)	57:05.03	Verónica Colindres (ESA)	59:08.60
High jump	Kay-De Vaughn (BIZ)	1.70	Alejandra Gómez (CRC)	1.61	María Gabriela Carrillo (ESA)	1.58
Pole vault	Gladys Quijada (ESA)	2.35	Inaly Morazán (NCA)	2.00		
Long jump	Tricia Flores (BIZ)	5.60 CR	María Gabriela Carrillo (ESA)	5.47	Sharon Ruiz (CRC)	5.21
Triple jump	Tricia Flores (BIZ)	11.96	María Gabriela Carrillo (ESA)	11.63	Sharon Ruiz (CRC)	11.46
Shot put	María Lourdes Ruiz (NCA)	11.54	Silvia Piñar (CRC)	10.28	Jannis Ramírez (NCA)	10.20
Discus throw	María Lourdes Ruiz (NCA)	40.24	Silvia Piñar (CRC)	36.38	Viviana Abarca (CRC)	30.52
Hammer throw	Silvia Piñar (CRC)	40.14	Yéssica Gómez (HON)	34.86	Viviana Abarca (CRC)	31.50
Javelin Throw	Dalila Rugama (NCA)	51.76 CR	Jannis Ramírez (NCA)	50.44	Jennifer Ovares (CRC)	29.05

== Medal table (unofficial) ==
* Host nation (Nicaragua)

Rank	Nation	Gold	Silver	Bronze	Total
1	Costa Rica (CRC)	15	16	16	47
2	El Salvador (ESA)	8	10	8	26
3	Nicaragua (NIC)*	5	4	7	16
4	Guatemala (GUA)	5	1	2	8
5	Belize (BIZ)	4	2	0	6
6	Honduras (HON)	3	6	2	11
7	Panama (PAN)	2	2	2	6
Totals (7 entries)		42	41	37	120

== Participation ==
A total of 183 athletes from 7 countries were reported to participate:

- Belize (4)
- Costa Rica (45)
- El Salvador (33)
- Guatemala (13)
- Honduras (20)
- Nicaragua (49)
- Panama (19)

=== Note ===
^{†}: There is a slight difference in silver medals between a published medal table and the unofficial medal count above.
