= Allan Ayala =

Guatemalan sprinter

Personal information
- Full name: Allan Guillermo Ayala Acevedo
- Born: July 7, 1986 (age 39) Guatemala City, Guatemala
- Height: 1.84 m (6 ft 1/2 in)
- Weight: 70 kg (154 lb)

Sport
- Country: Guatemala
- Sport: Men's Athletics
- Event(s): Hurdling, Sprint
Medal record
Men's athletics
Representing Guatemala
Central American Championships
Gold medal – first place	2008 San Pedro Sula	400 m hurdles
Gold medal – first place	2008 San Pedro Sula	4x400 m relay
Gold medal – first place	2007 San José	4x400 m relay
Silver medal – second place	2009 Guatemala City	400 m hurdles
Silver medal – second place	2008 San Pedro Sula	4x100 m relay
Silver medal – second place	2007 San José	400 m
Silver medal – second place	2007 San José	400 m hurdles
Bronze medal – third place	2007 San José	110 m hurdles
Bronze medal – third place	2005 San José	4x100 m relay
Bronze medal – third place	2005 San José	4x400 m relay
- Updated on 19 September 2012

Allan Ayala Acevedo (born July 7, 1986) is a Guatemalan track and field athlete, specialized in the 400m intermediate hurdles event. As a junior, he was a member of the team that broke the Guatemalan 4x400 relay Junior National Record in 2004.

In 2007, Ayala ran for Dickinson State University in North Dakota and was named Outstanding DAC Conference Track Athlete in both indoors and outdoors events. He was runner-up in the 400IH in the NAIA national championships; also setting a new Guatemalan national record in the event. Three weeks later he set the 400 meters Guatemalan national record in Costa Rica. He then broke his own record in the 400IH at Rio de Janeiro, Brazil. Ayala was also the only Guatemalan to run in the 2007 World Athletic Championships in Osaka, Japan.

== Achievements ==
Year	Competition	Venue	Position	Event	Notes
Representing Guatemala
2005	Central American Championships	San José, Costa Rica	3rd	4 × 100 m relay	42.40
2005	Central American Championships	San José, Costa Rica	3rd	4 × 400 m relay	3:20.91
2006	NACAC U-23 Championships	Santo Domingo, Dominican Republic	10th (h)	400m hurdles	53.55
2007	Central American Championships	San José, Costa Rica	2nd	400 m	48.05
2007	Central American Championships	San José, Costa Rica	3rd	110 m hurdles	15.07 (+1.1 m/s)
2007	Central American Championships	San José, Costa Rica	2nd	400 m hurdles	52.15
2007	Central American Championships	San José, Costa Rica	1st	4 × 400 m relay	3:13.95 CR
2007	NACAC Championships	San Salvador, El Salvador	7th	400 m hurdles	52.44
2007	NACAC Championships	San Salvador, El Salvador	5th	4 × 400 m relay	3:16.83
2007	Pan American Games	Rio de Janeiro, Brazil	13th (h)	400 m hurdles	51.20
2007	Pan American Games	Rio de Janeiro, Brazil	8th	4 × 400 m relay	3:17.86
2007	World Championships	Osaka, Japan	32nd (h)	400 m hurdles	52.26
2008	Central American Championships	San Pedro Sula, Honduras	1st	400 m hurdles	51.72
2008	Central American Championships	San Pedro Sula, Honduras	2nd	4 × 100 m relay	42.30
2008	Central American Championships	San Pedro Sula, Honduras	1st	4 × 400 m relay	3:15.28
2008	Ibero-American Championships	Iquique, Chile	4th	400 m hurdles	51.41
2008	Central American and Caribbean Championships	Cali, Colombia	6th	400 m hurdles	52.70
2008	NACAC U-23 Championships	Toluca, Mexico	4th	400m hurdles	52.05 A
2008	NACAC U-23 Championships	Toluca, Mexico	4th	4 × 400 m relay	3:13.83 A
2009	Central American Championships	Guatemala City, Guatemala	2nd	400 m hurdles	50.16
2009	Central American and Caribbean Championships	Havana, Cuba	10th (h)	400 m hurdles	51.89
2010	Ibero-American Championships	San Fernando, Spain	7th	400 m hurdles	51.82
2010	Central American and Caribbean Games	Mayagüez, Puerto Rico	12th (h)	400 m hurdles	53.57
2011	Pan American Games	Guadalajara, Mexico	—	400 m hurdles	DNF
