= Gabriela Traña =

Costa Rican long-distance runner

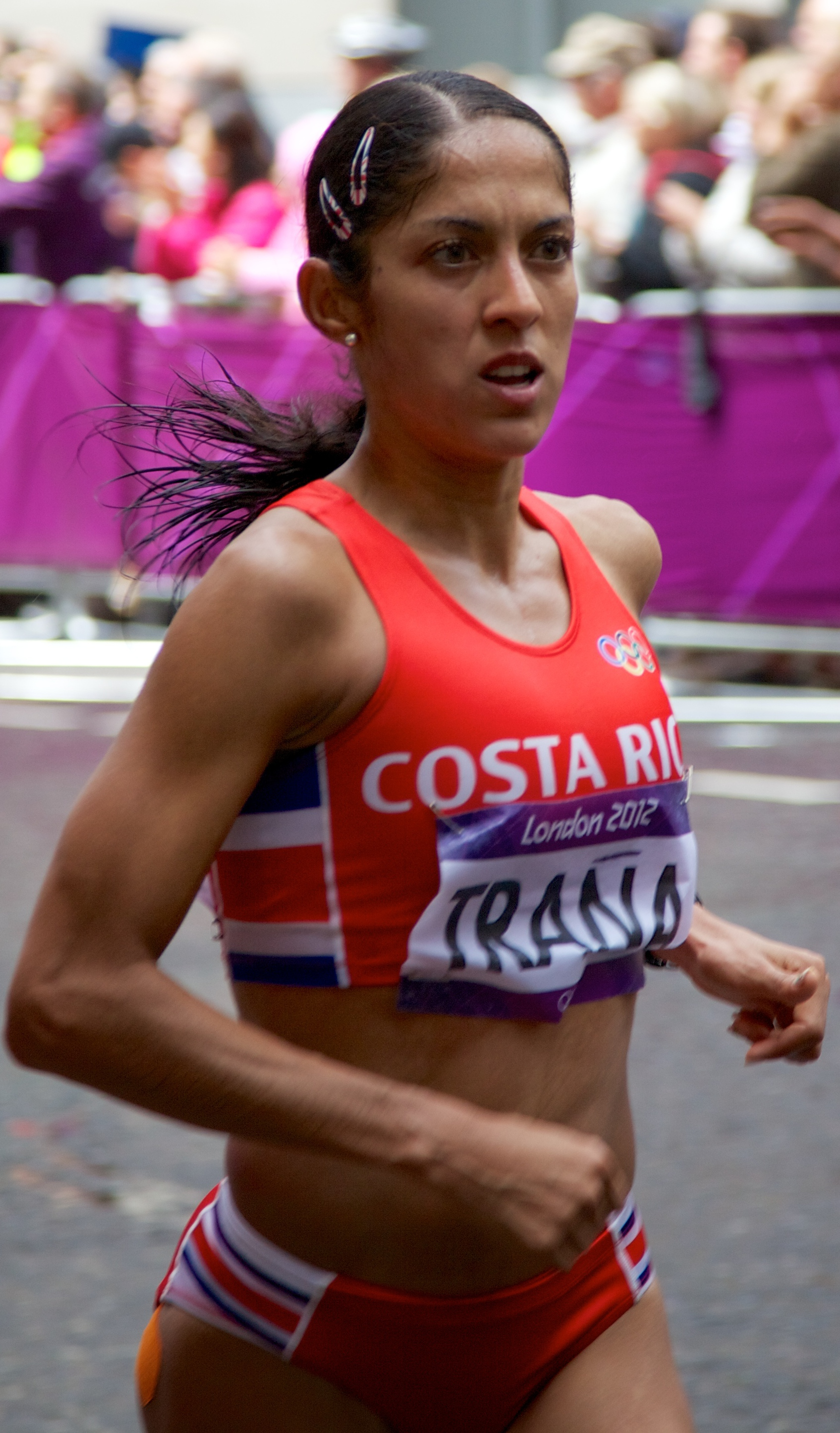
- Traña at the 2012 Summer Olympics

Personal information
- Full name: Gabriela Gerarda Traña Trigueros
- Born: March 3, 1980 (age 46) Alajuela, Costa Rica
- Height: 1.64 m (5 ft 4 1/2 in)
- Weight: 50 kg (110 lb)

Sport
- Country: Costa Rica
- Sport: Women's Athletics
- Event: Long distance running
Medal record
Women's Athletics
Representing Costa Rica
NACAC Championships
Bronze medal – third place	2007 El Salvador	3000 m st.
Central American and Caribbean Games
Silver medal – second place	2010 Mayagüez	Marathon
Central American Games
Gold medal – first place	2010 Ciudad de Panamá	10,000 m
Gold medal – first place	2013 San José	Marathon
Silver medal – second place	2001 Ciudad de Guatemala	1500 m
Bronze medal – third place	2001 Ciudad de Guatemala	5000 m
Bronze medal – third place	2001 Ciudad de Guatemala	4x400 m relay
Bronze medal – third place	2013 San José	5000 m
Central American Championships
Gold medal – first place	2007 San José	3000 m st.
Gold medal – first place	2005 San José	1500 m
Gold medal – first place	2004 Managua	1500 m
Gold medal – first place	2004 Managua	10,000 m
Silver medal – second place	2005 San José	5000 m
Silver medal – second place	2003 Ciudad de Guatemala	1500 m
- Updated on 1 January 2015

Gabriela Gerarda Traña Trigueros (born 3 March 1980) is a Costa Rican long-distance runner.

== Biography ==
She competed in the marathon at the 2008 Summer Olympics and the 2012 Summer Olympics. In 2012, she was also the flag bearer for the Costa Rican team during the opening ceremony. She was the Central American Champion in the marathon at the 2013 San José Games.

== Personal bests ==
- 800 m: 2:12.8 min – San José, 2003
- 1500 m: 4:32.58 min – Saint-Denis, 27 August 2003
- 3000 m: 9:50.56 min – Huelva, 8 August 2004
- 5000 m: 17:15.20 min – Huelva, 7 August 2004
- 10,000 m: 36:10.54 min – Managua, 26 September 2004
- Half marathon: 1:15:01 hrs – Edinburgh, 27 May 2012
- Marathon: 2:38:22 hrs – Berlin, 25 September 2011
- 3000 m steeplechase: 10:59.80 min – Ponce, 26 May 2006

== Achievements ==
Year	Competition	Venue	Position	Event	Notes
Representing Costa Rica
1994	Central American Age Group Championships	San Salvador, El Salvador	2nd	800 m	
1994	Central American Age Group Championships	San Salvador, El Salvador	2nd	1200 m	
1996	Central American and Caribbean Junior Championships (U17)	San Salvador, El Salvador	8th	800 m	2:27.31
1999	Central American Junior Championships	Puerto Barrios, Guatemala	1st	1500 m	
1999	Central American Junior Championships	Puerto Barrios, Guatemala	1st	5000 m	18:33.13 min
1999	Pan American Junior Championships	Tampa, United States	7th	1500 m	4:42.13
1999	Pan American Junior Championships	Tampa, United States	10th	5000 m	18:35.75
2001	Central American and Caribbean Championships	Guatemala City, Guatemala	7th	800 m	2:17.36
2001	Central American and Caribbean Championships	Guatemala City, Guatemala	3rd	1500 m	4:40.73
2001	Central American and Caribbean Championships	Guatemala City, Guatemala	6th	5000 m	18:16.19
2001	Central American Games	Guatemala City, Guatemala	2nd	1500 m	4:37.13 A
2001	Central American Games	Guatemala City, Guatemala	3rd	5000 m	18:25.57 A
2001	Central American Games	Guatemala City, Guatemala	3rd	4 × 400 m relay	4:04.89 A
2002	Ibero-American Championships	Guatemala City, Guatemala	7th	1500 m	4:47.81
2002	Ibero-American Championships	Guatemala City, Guatemala	6th	5000 m	18:48.67
2003	Central American Championships	Guatemala City, Guatemala	2nd	1500 m	4:41.27
2003	Central American Championships	Guatemala City, Guatemala	4th	5000 m	19:23.18
2003	Central American and Caribbean Championships	St. George's, Grenada	4th	1500 m	4:42.85
2003	World Championships	Paris, France	28th (h)	1500 m	4:32.58
2004	Ibero-American Championships	Huelva, Spain	11th	1500 m	4:48.27
2004	Ibero-American Championships	Huelva, Spain	11th	3000 m	9:50.56
2004	Ibero-American Championships	Huelva, Spain	10th	5000 m	17:15.20
2004	Central American Championships	Managua, Nicaragua	1st	1500 m	4:35.11 CR
2004	Central American Championships	Managua, Nicaragua	1st	10,000 m	36:10.54 CR
2005	Central American Championships	San José, Costa Rica	1st	1500 m	4:39.12
2005	Central American Championships	San José, Costa Rica	2nd	5000 m	18:14.86
2005	Universiade	İzmir, Turkey	23rd (h)	800 m	2:16.49
2005	Universiade	İzmir, Turkey	19th (h)	1500 m	4:38.30
2005	Universiade	İzmir, Turkey	17th (h)	5000 m	17:56.38
2006	Ibero-American Championships	Ponce, Puerto Rico	5th	3000 m	9:54.67
2006	Ibero-American Championships	Ponce, Puerto Rico	5th	3000 m s'chase	10:59.80
2007	Central American Championships	San José, Costa Rica	1st	3000 m s'chase	11:19.81
2007	NACAC Championships	San Salvador, El Salvador	3rd	3000 m s'chase	11:11.17
2007	World Championships	Osaka, Japan	25th (h)	5000 m	17:45.56 SB
2008	Olympic Games	Beijing, China	68th	Marathon	2:53:45
2010	Central American Games	Panama City, Panama	1st	10,000 m	37:31.17
2010	Central American and Caribbean Games	Mayagüez, Puerto Rico	2nd	Marathon	2:46:22
2011	Pan American Games	Guadalajara, Mexico	12th	Marathon	3:04:29
2012	Olympic Games	London, United Kingdom	90th	Marathon	2:43:17
2013	Central American Games	San José, Costa Rica	3rd	5000 m	17:36.28
2013	Central American Games	San José, Costa Rica	1st	Marathon	2:54:59
2014	World Half Marathon Championships	Copenhagen, Denmark	75th	Half marathon	1:19:25
2014	Central American and Caribbean Games	Xalapa, Mexico	7th	Marathon	2:51:51 A
2015	NACAC Championships	San José, Costa Rica	3rd	5000 m	18:41.98
2019	Pan American Games	Lima, Peru	12th	Marathon	2:49:28
2019	World Championships	Doha, Qatar	40th	Marathon	3:19:13

Olympic Games
Preceded by Allan Segura	Flagbearer for Costa Rica; London 2012	Succeeded by Nery Brenes
