= Dalila Rugama =

Nicaraguan javelin thrower

Personal information
- Full name: Olivia Dalila Rugama; Carmona
- Nationality: Nicaragua
- Born: 9 April 1984 (age 42) Managua, Nicaragua
- Height: 1.70 m (5 ft 7 in)
- Weight: 57 kg (126 lb)

Sport
- Sport: Athletics
- Event: Javelin throw

Achievements and titles
- Personal best: Javelin throw: 55.28 (2007)

Olivia Dalila Rugama Carmona (born April 9, 1984, in Managua) is a Nicaraguan javelin thrower. She represented her nation Nicaragua at the 2004 Summer Olympics, and also registered her own national record of 55.28 metres in the women's javelin throw at the 2007 Bolivarian Games in Caracas, Venezuela. Throughout her career, Rugama was part of the team of the Polytechnic University of Nicaragua's track and field squad.

Rugama qualified for the Nicaraguan squad in the women's javelin throw at the 2004 Summer Olympics in Athens, by granting an invitation from the Nicaraguan Olympic Committee (Spanish: Comité Olímpico Nicaragüense) and the IAAF under the Universality rule with an entry mark of 53.23. Rugama threw a javelin with a satisfying distance of 51.42 metres on her second attempt in the prelims, but her effort was not sufficient to compete for the final round with a fortieth-place finish.

Dalila Rugama has won in 4 times (2001, 2006, 2013 and 2017) the Women's Javelin Throw and 1 time (2006) the Women's Shot Put in the Central American Games. Similarly won in 12 times (2003, 2004, 2005, 2007, 2010, 2011, 2012, 2013, 2015, 2016, 2017 and 2018) the Women's Javelin Throw and 1 time (2018) the Women's Shot Put in the Central American Championships in Athletics.

Dalila Rugama is the best in the Women's Javelin Throw in the history of Central American.

== International Competitions ==
Year	Competition	Venue	Position	Event	Notes
Representing Nicaragua
2001	Central American and Caribbean Championships in Athletics	Guatemala City, Guatemala	3rd	Javelin Throw	42.19
2001	Athletics at the 2001 Central American Games	Guatemala City, Guatemala	1st	Javelin Throw	44.16
2002	Ibero-American Championships in Athletics	Guatemala City, Guatemala	8th	Javelin Throw	43.52
2002	World Junior Championships in Athletics	Kingston, Jamaica	12th	Javelin Throw	41.97
2002	Athletics at the 2002 Central American and Caribbean Games	San Salvador, El Salvador	4th	Javelin Throw	44.91
2002	Central American Championships in Athletics	San Jose, Costa Rica	1st	Javelin Throw	46.62
2003	Central American and Caribbean Championships in Athletics	St. George's, Grenada	3rd	Javelin Throw	47.40
2003	Pan American Junior Athletics Championships	Bridgetown, Barbados	3rd	Javelin Throw	48.61
2003	Pan American Games	Santo Domingo, Dominican Republic	9th	Javelin Throw	44.50
2003	Central American Championships in Athletics	Guatemala City, Guatemala	1st	Javelin Throw	49.40
2004	2004	La Habana, Cuba	4th	Javelin Throw	48.14
2004	2004	La Habana, Cuba	4th	Javelin Throw	52.00
2004	2004	La Habana, Cuba	1st	Javelin Throw	53.09
2004	Olympic Games	Athens, Greece	40th	Javelin Throw	51.42
2004	Central American Championships in Athletics	Managua, Nicaragua	1st	Javelin Throw	51.76
2004	2004	Guatemala City, Guatemala	1st	Javelin Throw	48.86
2005	Central American Championships in Athletics	San Jose, Costa Rica	1st	Javelin Throw	50.35
2005	2005	Guatemala City, Guatemala	1st	Javelin Throw	52.10
2006	Athletics at the 2006 Central American Games	Managua, Nicaragua	1st	Javelin Throw	49.48
2006	Athletics at the 2006 Central American Games	Managua, Nicaragua	1st	Shot Put	11.09
2006	NACAC Under-23 Championships in Athletics	Santo Domingo, Dominican Republic	5th	Javelin Throw	49.31
2006	Athletics at the 2006 Central American and Caribbean Games	Cartagena, Colombia	6th	Javelin Throw	53.05
2007	ALBA Games	Caracas, Venezuela	4th	Javelin Throw	55.28
2007	Central American Championships in Athletics	San Jose, Costa Rica	1st	Javelin Throw	52.10
2007	Pan American Games	Rio de Janeiro, Brazil	7th	Javelin Throw	52.36
2007	World Championships in Athletics	Osaka, Japan	29th	Javelin Throw	53.22
2008	2008	La Habana, Cuba	2nd	Javelin Throw	54.70
2008	2008	La Habana, Cuba	3rd	Javelin Throw	52.14
2008	Central American and Caribbean Championships in Athletics	Cali, Colombia	5th	Javelin Throw	52.83
2010	Central American Championships in Athletics	Guatemala City, Guatemala	1st	Javelin Throw	46.84
2011	Central American Championships in Athletics	San Jose, Costa Rica	1st	Javelin Throw	45.45
2011	ALBA Games	Barquisimeto, Venezuela	4th	Javelin Throw	49.63
2011	Pan American Games	Guadalajara, Mexico	14th	Javelin Throw	46.82
2012	Central American Championships in Athletics	Managua, Nicaragua	1st	Javelin Throw	48.59
2013	Athletics at the 2013 Central American Games	San Jose, Costa Rica	1st	Javelin Throw	48.40
2013	Central American Championships in Athletics	Managua, Nicaragua	1st	Javelin Throw	50.61
2015	Central American Championships in Athletics	Managua, Nicaragua	1st	Javelin Throw	48.65
2015	Pan American Games	Toronto, Canada	DQ	Javelin Throw	NM
2016	Central American Championships in Athletics	San Salvador, El Salvador	1st	Javelin Throw	48.00
2016	Central American Championships in Athletics	San Salvador, El Salvador	9th	Shot Put	10.17
2017	Central American Championships in Athletics	Tegucigalpa, Honduras	1st	Javelin Throw	48.51
2017	Central American Championships in Athletics	Tegucigalpa, Honduras	2nd	Shot Put	12.29
2017	Athletics at the 2017 Central American Games	Managua, Nicaragua	1st	Javelin Throw	53.47
2017	Athletics at the 2017 Central American Games	Managua, Nicaragua	3rd	Shot Put	12.89
2018	Central American Championships in Athletics	Guatemala City, Guatemala	1st	Javelin Throw	47.93
2018	Central American Championships in Athletics	Guatemala City, Guatemala	1st	Shot Put	12.91
2018	Athletics at the 2018 Central American and Caribbean Games	Barranquilla, Colombia	4th	Javelin Throw	50.30
