= Sharolyn Scott =

Costa Rican hurdler (born 1983)

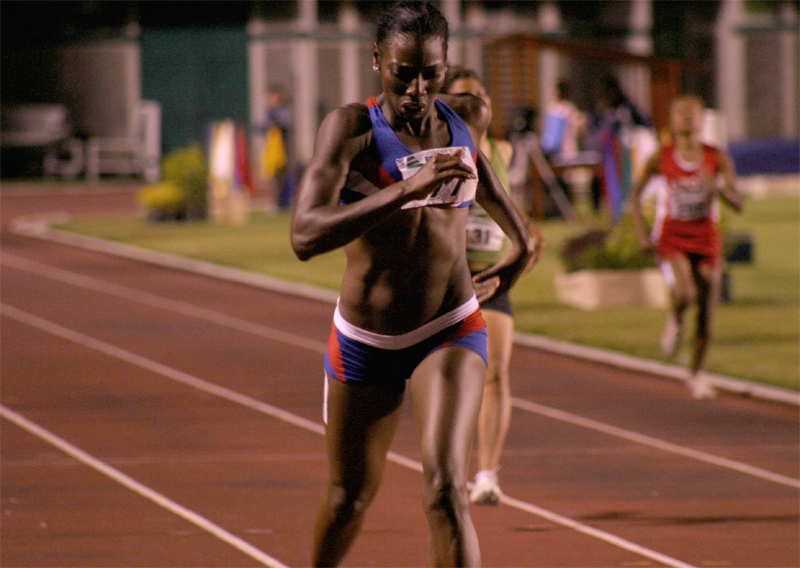

Personal information
- Full name: Sharolyn Scott Norman
- Born: 27 October 1983 (age 42) Limón, Costa Rica
- Height: 1.67 m (5 ft 5 1/2 in)
- Weight: 64 kg (141 lb)

Sport
- Country: Costa Rica
- Sport: Women's Athletics
- Events: Hurdling, Sprint
Medal record
Women's Athletics
Representing Costa Rica
Ibero-American Championships
Silver medal – second place	2012 Barquisimeto	400 m hurdles
Central American Games
Gold medal – first place	2010 Panama City	400 m hurdles
Gold medal – first place	2013 San José	400 m hurdles
Gold medal – first place	2013 San José	4x400 m relay
Silver medal – second place	2010 Panama City	400 m
Bronze medal – third place	2010 Panama City	4x400 m relay
Bronze medal – third place	2013 San José	400 m
Central American Championships
Gold medal – first place	2007 San José	4x100 m relay
Gold medal – first place	2008 San Pedro Sula	100 m
Gold medal – first place	2009 Guatemala City	200 m
Gold medal – first place	2009 Guatemala City	4x100 m relay
Gold medal – first place	2010 Guatemala City	400 m hurdles
Gold medal – first place	2010 Guatemala City	4x100 m relay
Gold medal – first place	2011 San José	400 m
Gold medal – first place	2011 San José	400 m hurdles
Gold medal – first place	2011 San José	4x400 m relay
Silver medal – second place	2007 San José	100 m hurdles
Silver medal – second place	2008 San Pedro Sula	100 m hurdles
Silver medal – second place	2008 San Pedro Sula	200 m
Silver medal – second place	2009 Guatemala City	100 m
Silver medal – second place	2010 Guatemala City	400 m
- Updated on 3 January 2015

Sharolyn Scott Norman (born 27 October 1983) is a Costa Rican hurdler. At the 2012 Summer Olympics, she competed in the Women's 400 metres hurdles.

== Personal bests ==
- 100 m: 12.50 s (wind: +0.0 m/s) – San Pedro Sula, Honduras, 28 June 2008
- 200 m: 24.45 s (wind: +1.3 m/s) – Medellín, Colombia, 6 October 2013
- 400 m: 54.24 s – Bogotá, Colombia, 20 July 2013
- 110 m hurdles: 14.57 s (wind: +1.8 m/s) – San Salvador, El Salvador, 13 July 2007
- 400 m hurdles: 56.19 s – Rehlingen-Siersburg, Germany, 28 May 2012

== International competitions ==
Year	Competition	Venue	Position	Event	Notes
Representing Costa Rica
2001	Central American and Caribbean Championships	Guatemala City, Guatemala	5th	100 m H	15.51 (-0.8 m/s)
2001	Central American and Caribbean Championships	Guatemala City, Guatemala	10th (h)	400 m H	68.39
2002	Central American Junior Championships	Guatemala City, Guatemala	1st	100 m H	15.28
2007	Central American Championships	San José, Costa Rica	2nd	100 m H	15.30 (+1.0 m/s)
2007	Central American Championships	San José, Costa Rica	1st	4 × 100 m	48.07
2007	NACAC Championships	San Salvador, El Salvador	10th (h)	100 m H	14.57 (+1.8 m/s)
2008	Central American Championships	San Pedro Sula, Honduras	1st	100 m	12.50 (+0.5 m/s)
2008	Central American Championships	San Pedro Sula, Honduras	2nd	200 m	25.91 w (+2.9 m/s)
2008	Central American Championships	San Pedro Sula, Honduras	2nd	100 m H	14.59 (+1.0 m/s)
2009	Central American Championships	Guatemala City, Guatemala	2nd	100 m	12.05 (NWI)
2009	Central American Championships	Guatemala City, Guatemala	1st	200 m	24.75 (NWI)
2009	Central American Championships	Guatemala City, Guatemala	1st	4 × 100 m	47.61 CR
2009	Central American and Caribbean Championships	Havana, Cuba	19th (h)	100 m	12.20 (-0.5 m/s)
2009	Central American and Caribbean Championships	Havana, Cuba	14th (h)	200 m	25.02 (-1.8 m/s)
2009	Central American and Caribbean Championships	Havana, Cuba	7th	4 × 100 m	47.46
2009	Central American and Caribbean Championships	Havana, Cuba	7th	4 × 400 m	3:54.81
2009	World Championships	Berlin, Germany	33rd (h)	400 m	55.63
2010	Central American Games	Panama City, Panama	4th	200 m	25.40 (wind: +0.5 m/s)
2010	Central American Games	Panama City, Panama	2nd	400 m	56.75
2010	Central American Games	Panama City, Panama	1st	400 m H	61.51
2010	Central American Games	Panama City, Panama	3rd	4 × 400 m	3:54.83
2010	Central American and Caribbean Games	Mayagüez, Puerto Rico	11th (h)	400 m	56.14
2010	Central American and Caribbean Games	Mayagüez, Puerto Rico	5th	400 m H	58.89
2010	Central American and Caribbean Games	Mayagüez, Puerto Rico	6th	4 × 100 m	47.31 NR
2010	Ibero-American Championships	San Fernando, Spain	10th	400 m	55.83
2010	Central American Championships	Guatemala City, Guatemala	2nd	400 m	55.54
2010	Central American Championships	Guatemala City, Guatemala	1st	400 m H	61.53
2010	Central American Championships	Guatemala City, Guatemala	1st	4 × 100 m	48.48
2011	Central American Championships	San José, Costa Rica	1st	400 m	55.03
2011	Central American Championships	San José, Costa Rica	1st	400 m H	58.78 CR
2011	Central American Championships	San José, Costa Rica	1st	4 × 400 m	3:49.23 CR
2011	Central American and Caribbean Championships	Mayagüez, Puerto Rico	7th	400 m H	58.86
2011	World Championships	Daegu, South Korea	33rd	400 m H	58.78
2011	Pan American Games	Guadalajara, Mexico	4th	400 m H	57.40
2012	Ibero-American Championships	Barquisimeto, Venezuela	2nd	400 m H	57.10
2012	Olympic Games	London, United Kingdom	27th (h)	400 m H	57.03
2013	Central American Games	San José, Costa Rica	3rd	400 m	55.15
2013	Central American Games	San José, Costa Rica	1st	400 m H	59.57
2013	Central American Games	San José, Costa Rica	1st	4 × 400 m	3:48.90
2013	Central American Championships	Managua, Nicaragua	1st	400 m	55.78
2013	Central American Championships	Managua, Nicaragua	1st	400 m H	59.78
2013	Central American Championships	Managua, Nicaragua	1st	4 × 400 m	3:50.03
2013	Central American and Caribbean Championships	Morelia, Mexico	16th (h)	400 m	54.73
2013	Central American and Caribbean Championships	Morelia, Mexico	2nd	400 m H	57.74
2014	Central American Championships	Tegucigalpa, Honduras	1st	400 m H	61.10
2014	Central American Championships	Tegucigalpa, Honduras	1st	4 × 400 m	3:50.97
2014	Ibero-American Championships	São Paulo, Brazil	3rd	400 m H	58.10
2014	Central American and Caribbean Games	Xalapa, Mexico	4th	400 m H	57.75 A
2014	Central American and Caribbean Games	Xalapa, Mexico	—	4 × 400 m	DSQ
2015	Pan American Games	Toronto, Canada	7th	400 m H	58.65
2015	NACAC Championships	San José, Costa Rica	10th (h)	400 m H	57.96
2015	NACAC Championships	San José, Costa Rica	6th	4 × 400 m	3:41.40
2016	Olympic Games	Rio de Janeiro, Brazil	40th (h)	400 m H	58.27
2018	Central American and Caribbean Games	Barranquilla, Colombia	13th (h)	400 m H	60.46
2018	Central American and Caribbean Games	Barranquilla, Colombia	6th	4 × 400 m	3:40.23
