= 2008 Central American Championships in Athletics =

XIX Central American Championships in Athletics
- Dates: June 27–28
- Host city: San Pedro Sula, Honduras
- Venue: Estadio Olímpico Metropolitano
- Level: Senior
- Events: 43 (22 men, 21 women)
- Participation: 6 nations

The 19th Central American Championships in Athletics were held at the Estadio Olímpico Metropolitano in San Pedro Sula, Honduras, between June 27–28, 2008.

A total of 43 events were contested, 22 by men and 21 by women. There were no athletes from Belize.

== Medal summary ==
Complete results and medal winners were published. A total of 5 championships records were set.

=== Men ===
Event	Gold		Silver		Bronze	
100 metres (wind: -0.2 m/s)	Rolando Palacios (HON)	10.61	Babner Bardales (HON)	11.02	Renan Palma (ESA)	11.19
200 metres (wind: -0.1 m/s)	Rolando Palacios (HON)	21.25	Babner Bardales (HON)	22.20	Oscar Barzuna (CRC)	22.46
400 metres	Andrés Rodríguez (PAN)	47.59	Takeshi Fujiwara (ESA)	47.89	Pedro Suazo (HON)	48.88
800 metres	Marco Pérez (CRC)	1:53.52	Jenner Pelicó (GUA)	1:53.71	Camilo Quevedo (GUA)	1:54.97
1500 metres	Jenner Pelicó (GUA)	4:01.94	Francis Jiménez (ESA)	4:02.47	Carlos Álvarez (GUA)	4:04.43
5000 metres	Estuardo Palacios (GUA)	15:21.64	Jeremías Saloj (GUA)	15:23.21	Williams Sánchez (ESA)	15:28.96
10,000 metres	Jeremías Saloj (GUA)	31:58.59	Estuardo Palacios (GUA)	32:21.49	Dimas Castro (NCA)	33:17.32
110 metres hurdles (wind: 1.0 m/s)	Ronald Bennett (HON)	14.35	Renan Palma (ESA)	14.76	Luis Carlos Bonilla (GUA)	14.79
400 metres hurdles	Allan Ayala (GUA)	51.72	Camilo Quevedo (GUA)	52.80	Jonnie Lowe (HON)	53.16
3000 metres steeplechase	Álvaro Vásquez (NCA)	9:33.61	Domingo Alvarez (GUA)	9:42.32	Douglas Aguilar (ESA)	9:45.94
4 x 100 metres relay	Honduras; Rolando Palacios; Babner Bardales; Ronald Bennett; Jonnie Lowe	41.10	Guatemala; Patrick Holwerda; Benjamín Rodríguez; Allan Ayala; Juan Carlos Nájera	42.30	Costa Rica; José González; Marco Pérez; Oscar Barzuna; Luis Rojas	42.75
4 x 400 metres relay	Guatemala; Hans Villagrán; Patrick Holwerda; Allan Ayala; Camilo Quevedo	3:15.28	El Salvador; Juan Cuellar; José González; Takeshi Fujiwara; Francis Jiménez	3:20.70	Honduras; Pedro Suazo; Juan José Alvarez; Jonnie Lowe; Maxin Espinal	3:21.27
10,000 metres Walk	Aníbal Paau (GUA)	44:24.02	Luis Gómez (GUA)	46:54.55	Osman Flores (NCA)	53:13.80
High jump	Octavius Gillespie (GUA)	2.00	Jason Castro (HON)	1.80		
Pole vault	Pedro Figueroa (ESA)	4.21				
Long jump	Kessel Campbell (HON)	7.52 CR (wind: NWI)	Juan Carlos Nájera (GUA)	6.99 (wind: NWI)	Ulises Peña (NCA)	6.85 (wind: NWI)
Triple jump	Juan Carlos Nájera (GUA)	15.45 (wind: NWI)	Michael Thompson (PAN)	15.20 (wind: NWI)	Jason Castro (HON)	14.69 (wind: NWI)
Shot put	Edson Monzón (GUA)	14.05	Juan Enrique Galdámez (ESA)	12.18	Milton Cisne (NCA)	11.81
Discus throw	Juan Enrique Galdámez (ESA)	43.97	Raúl Rivera (GUA)	42.57	Kayro Martínez (NCA)	40.55
Hammer throw	Raúl Rivera (GUA)	63.92 CR	Diego Berrios (GUA)	56.56	Milton Cisne (NCA)	43.55
Javelin throw	Javier Ugarte (NCA)	61.04	Rigoberto Calderón (NCA)	60.74	Edin Trigueros (GUA)	50.22
Decathlon	Darvin Colón (HON)	6690 CR	Daniel Gutiérrez (ESA)	4654	Ernesto Mendizabal (GUA)	2413

=== Women ===
Event	Gold		Silver		Bronze	
100 metres (wind: 0.0 m/s)	Sharolyn Scott (CRC)	12.50	Lissette Mejía (ESA)	12.64	Jessica Lino (HON)	12.75
200 metres (wind: 2.9 m/s)	Lissette Mejía (ESA)	25.54 w	Sharolyn Scott (CRC)	25.91 w	Natalia Santamaría (ESA)	26.38 w
400 metres	Natalia Santamaría (ESA)	59.37	Josseline Escobar (ESA)	59.67	Jessica Aguilera (NCA)	59.76
800 metres	Brenda Salmeron (ESA)	2:12.30	Gladys Landaverde (ESA)	2:12.36	Cecilia Gutiérrez (GUA)	2:15.37
1500 metres	Gladys Landaverde (ESA)	4:40.12	Brenda Salmeron (ESA)	4:44.15	Cecilia Gutiérrez (GUA)	4:53.18
5000 metres	Merlin Chalí (GUA)	18:11.12	Delbin Solis (ESA)	18:22.83	Eva María Rodríguez (ESA)	18:54.86
10,000 metres	Élida De Xuyá (GUA)	39:18.36	Delbin Solis (ESA)	39:21.86	Eva María Rodríguez (ESA)	40:46.66
100 metres hurdles (wind: 1.0 m/s)	Jeimmy Bernárdez (HON)	14.11 CR	Sharolyn Scott (CRC)	14.59	Claudia Villeda (GUA)	15.28
400 metres hurdles	Ana María Porras (CRC)	65.54	Jessica Aguilera (NCA)	65.97	Bessy Flores (ESA)	66.14
3000 metres steeplechase	Evonne Marroquín (GUA)	11:22.87	Blanca Solís (ESA)	11:26.77	Ligia Morales (GUA)	11:43.41
4 x 100 metres relay	El Salvador; Lissette Mejía; Natalia Santamaría; Iris Santamaría; Bessy Flores	49.29	Guatemala; Francisca Martínez; Estefany Cruz; Claudia Villeda; Ginna von Quednow	50.38	Nicaragua; Mariangeles Escobar; Inaly Morazán; Jessica Aguilera; Indira Pérez	51.84
4 x 400 metres relay	El Salvador; Natalia Santamaría; Josseline Escobar; Gladys Landaverde; Brenda Salmeron	4:07.92	Nicaragua; Mariangeles Escobar; Jessica Aguilera; Cony Villalobos; Aldy Villalobos	4:22.45		
10,000 metres Walk	Verónica Colindres (ESA)	53:47.09	Zoila Reyes (GUA)	55:51.17	Ligia Altamirano (NCA)	1:09:24.40
Pole vault^{†}						
Long jump	Estefany Cruz (GUA)	5.67 (wind: NWI)	Francisca Martínez (GUA)	5.44 (wind: NWI)	Ana María Porras (CRC)	5.02 (wind: NWI)
Triple jump	Estefany Cruz (GUA)	12.19 (wind: NWI)	Sharon Ruiz (CRC)	11.46 (wind: NWI)		
Shot put	Dorothy López (GUA)	12.52	Lourdes Meléndez (ESA)	9.88	Ana Harry (HON)	8.35
Discus throw	Dorothy López (GUA)	39.85	Lourdes Meléndez (ESA)	32.42	Jennifer Palma (HON)	32.28
Hammer throw	Rosita De León (GUA)	48.96 CR	Fabiola Jovel (ESA)	37.77	Dorothy López (GUA)	33.17
Javelin throw	Sandra Centeno (NCA)	39.90	Ginna von Quednow (GUA)	38.48	Lorena Medina (ESA)	37.44
Heptathlon	Ginna von Quednow (GUA)	3726	Inaly Morazán (NCA)	3542	Jennifer Henríquez (ESA)	3427

==== Notes ====
^{†}: No athlete cleared the initial height.

== Medal table (unofficial) ==
* Host nation ( Honduras)

Rank	Nation	Gold	Silver	Bronze	Total
1	Guatemala	19	14	10	43
2	El Salvador	9	16	9	34
3	Honduras*	7	3	7	17
4	Nicaragua	3	4	9	16
5	Costa Rica	3	3	3	9
6	Panama	1	1	0	2
Totals (6 entries)		42	41	38	121

== Team Rankings ==
Guatemala won the overall team ranking and the team ranking in the men's category. El Salvador won the team ranking in the women's category.

=== Total ===
The host country is highlighted in lavender blue

Rank	Nation	Points
1st place, gold medalist(s)	Guatemala	337
2nd place, silver medalist(s)	El Salvador	294
3rd place, bronze medalist(s)	Nicaragua	199
4	Honduras	184
5	Costa Rica	100
6	Panama	17

=== Male ===
The host country is highlighted in lavender blue

Rank	Nation	Points
1st place, gold medalist(s)	Guatemala	202
2nd place, silver medalist(s)	Honduras	122
3rd place, bronze medalist(s)	El Salvador	111
4	Nicaragua	107
5	Costa Rica	57
6	Panama	17

=== Female ===
The host country is highlighted in lavender blue

Rank	Nation	Points
1st place, gold medalist(s)	El Salvador	183
2nd place, silver medalist(s)	Guatemala	135
3rd place, bronze medalist(s)	Nicaragua	92
4	Honduras	62
5	Costa Rica	43
