= Athletics at the 2011 Pan American Games – Women's 400 metres hurdles =

Women's 400 metres hurdles at the 2011 Pan American Games
- Venue: Telmex Athletics Stadium
- Dates: October 24–26
- Competitors: 13 from 11 nations

Medalists
Gold medal	Princesa Oliveros	Colombia
Silver medal	Lucy Jaramillo	Ecuador
Bronze medal	Yolanda Osana	Dominican Republic

The women's 400 metres hurdles sprint competition of the athletics events at the 2011 Pan American Games took place between the 24 and 26 of October at the Telmex Athletics Stadium. The defending Pan American Games champion was Sheena Johnson of the United States.

== Records ==
Prior to this competition, the existing world and Pan American Games records were as follows:

World record	Yuliya Pechonkina (RUS)	52.34	Tula, Russia	August 8, 2003
Pan American Games record	Daimí Pernía (CUB)	53.44	Winnipeg, Canada	July 28, 1999

== Qualification ==
Each National Olympic Committee (NOC) was able to enter one athlete regardless if they had met the qualification standard. To enter two entrants both athletes had to have met the minimum standard (60.40) in the qualifying period (January 1, 2010 to September 14, 2011).

== Schedule ==
Date	Time	Round
October 24, 2011	15:50	Semifinals
October 26, 2011	18:40	Final

== Results ==
All times shown are in seconds.

KEY:	q	Fastest non-qualifiers	Q	Qualified	NR	National record	PB	Personal best	SB	Seasonal best	DQ	Disqualified

=== Semifinals ===
Held on October 24. The first three in each heat and the next two fastest advanced to the finals.

Rank	Heat	Name	Nationality	Time	Notes
1	2	Sharolyn Scott	Costa Rica	57.23	Q, PB
2	1	Princesa Oliveros	Colombia	57.55	Q, PB
3	2	Mackenzie Hill	United States	57.82	Q
4	2	Yolanda Osana	Dominican Republic	57.86	Q
5	2	Jailma de Lima	Brazil	58.29	q
6	1	Lucy Jaramillo	Ecuador	58.54	Q, PB
7	1	Takecia Jameson	United States	58.68	Q
8	1	Karla Saviñón	Mexico	59.00	q
9	1	Sheryl Morgan	Jamaica	59.59	
10	1	Katrina Seymour	Bahamas	1:00.34	
11	2	Déborah Rodríguez	Uruguay	1:00.72	
12	2	Rushell Clayton	Jamaica	1:03.44	
13	1	Jessica Aguilera	Nicaragua	1:03.75	

=== Final ===
Held on October 26.

Rank	Name	Nationality	Time	Notes
1st place, gold medalist(s)	Princesa Oliveros	Colombia	56.26	PB
2nd place, silver medalist(s)	Lucy Jaramillo	Ecuador	56.95	PB
3rd place, bronze medalist(s)	Yolanda Osana	Dominican Republic	57.08	NR
4	Sharolyn Scott	Costa Rica	57.40	
5	Jailma de Lima	Brazil	57.71	
6	Takecia Jameson	United States	57.89	
7	Mackenzie Hill	United States	58.08	
8	Karla Saviñón	Mexico	58.57	
