= Athletics at the 1991 Pan American Games – Women's discus throw =

Women's discus throw at the Pan American Games

The women's discus throw event at the 1991 Pan American Games was held in Havana, Cuba on 7 August.

== Results ==
Rank	Name	Nationality	#1	#2	#3	#4	#5	#6	Result	Notes
1st place, gold medalist(s)	Bárbara Hechavarría	Cuba	62.74	x	63.42	62.04	63.50	57.04	63.50	
2nd place, silver medalist(s)	Hilda Ramos	Cuba	61.86	x	56.32	63.38	x	60.94	63.38	
3rd place, bronze medalist(s)	Lacy Barnes	United States	59.68	x	x	60.32	55.46	57.00	60.32	
4	Pam Dukes	United States	53.08	x	54.42	55.96	x	51.92	55.96	
5	María Urrutia	Colombia	54.16	x	53.96	55.30	53.28	55.80	55.80	
6	Theresa Brick	Canada	x	48.50	x	x	51.24	48.78	51.24	
7	Georgette Reed	Canada	50.88	45.32	47.18	x	x	49.90	50.88	
8	María Lourdes Ruiz	Nicaragua	42.50	40.12	x	37.36	39.86	41.80	42.50	
	Elisângela Adriano	Brazil	x	x	x				NM	
	Hughette Robertson	Guyana	x	x	x				NM	
