= 2005 Central American Championships in Athletics =

XVII Central American Championships in Athletics
- Dates: June 3–4
- Host city: San José, Costa Rica
- Venue: Estadio Nacional
- Level: Senior
- Events: 44 (22 men, 22 women)
- Participation: 7 nations

The 17th Central American Championships in Athletics were held at the Estadio Nacional in San José, Costa Rica, between June 3–4, 2005.

A total of 44 events were contested, 22 by men and 22 by women.

== Medal summary ==
Complete results and medal winners were published.

=== Men ===
Event	Gold		Silver		Bronze	
100 metres (wind: -3.2 m/s)	Andrés Leonel Rodríguez (PAN)	11.12	Carlos Abaunza (NCA)	11.14	Félix Moulanier (PAN)	11.19
200 metres (wind: +0.8 m/s)	Andrés Leonel Rodríguez (PAN)	21.77	Jean Patrick Holwerda (GUA)	21.82	Félix Moulanier (PAN)	22.42
400 metres	Nery Brenes (CRC)	46.42 CR	Roberto Cortés (ESA)	47.91	Víctor Cantillano (CRC)	48.68
800 metres	Marco Pérez (CRC)	1:52.57	Roberto Cortés (ESA)	1:52.64	Jenner Pelicó (GUA)	1:53.40
1500 metres	Francis Jiménez (ESA)	4:02.43	José Francisco Chávez (CRC)	4:05.05	Jenner Pelicó (GUA)	4:06.37
5000 metres	Roy Vargas (CRC)	15:02.58	Ricardo Iquité (GUA)	15:03.68	Cristian Villavicencio (NCA)	15:09.62
10,000 metres	José Amado García (GUA)	30:11.54	Alfredo Arévalo (GUA)	30:45.72	Cristian Villavicencio (NCA)	31:14.15
110 metres hurdles (wind: -1.7 m/s)	David Umaña (CRC)	15.06	Ronald Bennett (HON)	15.07	Alejandro Olmedo (ESA)	15.67
400 metres hurdles	Jonathan Gibson (PAN)	52.78	Camilo Quevedo (GUA)	53.14	Paul Dennehy (ESA)	53.55
3000 metres steeplechase	César Lizano (CRC)	9:31.22	William Marroquín (ESA)	9:37.62	Jorge Núñez (CRC)	9:50.17
4 x 100 metres relay	Honduras; Alex Geovany Navas; Ronald Bennett; Darwin Colón; Jonnie Lowe	42.18	Nicaragua; Carlos Abaunza; Holman Matamoros; Jorge Conde; Denis Gutiérrez	42.25	Guatemala; Maxwell Álvarez; Jean Patrick Holwerda; Allan Ayala; Juan Carlos Nájera	42.40
4 x 400 metres relay	Costa Rica; Marco Pérez; Greivin González; Víctor Cantillano; Nery Brenes	3:15.52 CR	El Salvador; Alejandro Olmedo; Paul Dennehy; Rubén Guevara; Roberto Cortés	3:20.33	Guatemala; Camilo Quevedo; Jenner Pelicó; Allan Ayala; Jean Patrick Holwerda	3:20.91
20 Kilometres Walk	Luis Fernando García (GUA)	1:26:21.85 CR	Ricardo Reyes (ESA)	1:30:27.73	Allan Segura (CRC)	1:31:13.95
High jump	Henry Linton (CRC)	2.09 CR	Alejandro Olmedo (ESA)	1.99	Anselmo Delgado (PAN)	1.99
Pole vault	Pedro Alfonso Fuentes (ESA)	4.40	Marco Josué Mira (ESA)	4.30	Edwin Barrientos (GUA)	4.30
Long jump	Jonathan Romero (PAN)	7.18 (wind: -1.6 m/s)	Maxwell Álvarez (GUA)	7.08 (wind: NWI)	Henry Linton (CRC)	6.62 (wind: NWI)
Triple jump	Maxwell Álvarez (GUA)	15.15 (wind: -1.7 m/s)	Juan Carlos Nájera (GUA)	14.78 (wind: -2.2 m/s)	Jonathan Romero (PAN)	14.34 (wind: -2.0 m/s)
Shot put	Henry Santos (GUA)	13.30	Esteban Caballero (PAN)	13.23	Roberto Sawyers (CRC)	13.02
Discus throw	Raúl Rivera (GUA)	45.70 CR	Nelson Chavarría (CRC)	45.49	Juan Galdamez (ESA)	42.72
Hammer throw	Raúl Rivera (GUA)	62.06	Roberto Sawyers (CRC)	54.20	Diego Berrios (GUA)	50.49
Javelin throw	Javier Ugarte (NCA)	67.12	Rigoberto Calderón (NCA)	62.19	Luis Brenes (CRC)	51.53
Decathlon	Darwin Colón (HON)	5798	Yehefry Vides (ESA)	5619	Mauricio Carranza (ESA)	4554

=== Women ===
Event	Gold		Silver		Bronze	
100 metres (wind: -3.7 m/s)	Tracy Joseph (CRC)	12.37	Tricia Flores (BIZ)	12.53	Mariela Leal (CRC)	12.73
200 metres (wind: -1.5 m/s)	Tracy Joseph (CRC)	24.98	Kaina Martínez (BIZ)	25.56	Verónica Quijano (ESA)	25.73
400 metres	Verónica Quijano (ESA)	55.75	Tracy Joseph (CRC)	56.84	Kaina Martínez (BIZ)	58.28
800 metres	Wendy Zúñiga (CRC)	2:13.99	Jéssica Bautista (ESA)	2:14.29	Yubelkis Casco (NCA)	2:14.67
1500 metres	Gabriela Traña (CRC)	4:39.12	Yeimy Navarro (CRC)	4:44.07	Yubelkis Casco (NCA)	4:51.43
5000 metres	Dina Judith Cruz (GUA)	18:00.07	Gabriela Traña (CRC)	18:14.86	Xiomara Rivera (ESA)	18:22.18
10,000 metres	Dina Judith Cruz (GUA)	37:40.68	Cristina Marín (CRC)	39:29.26	Guadalupe Zúñiga (CRC)	39:42.74
100 metres hurdles (wind: -1.3 m/s)	Jeimy Bernárdez (HON)	14.72 CR	Farina Murillo (CRC)	15.92	Cindy Sibaja (CRC)	16.91
400 metres hurdles	Verónica Quijano (ESA)	60.57 CR	Tamara Quintanilla (ESA)	65.25	Jessica Aguilera (NCA)	65.28
3000 metres steeplechase	Melissa González (CRC)	12:56.14	María Fernanda Mora (CRC)	13:43.80		
4 x 100 metres relay	Costa Rica; Mariela Leal; Melissa Moraga; Sarita Morales; Tracy Joseph	48.17	Nicaragua; Mayra Álvarez; Jessica Aguilera; Auxiliadora Lacayo; Henriette Guadamuz	48.87	El Salvador; Consuelo Vásquez; Verónica Quijano; Ruth González; Tamara Quintanilla	48.93
4 x 400 metres relay	El Salvador; Consuelo Vásquez; Jéssica Bautista; Tamara Quintanilla; Verónica Quijano	3:52.21 CR	Nicaragua; Henriette Guadamuz; Auxiliadora Lacayo; Yubelkis Casco; Jessica Aguilera	3:56.81	Costa Rica; Karen Arce; Wendy Zúñiga; Sarita Morales; Tracy Joseph	3:56.84
10,000 metres Walk	Evelyn Núñez (GUA)	48:45.46 CR	Glenda Ubeda (NCA)	54:31.72	María Ferris (PAN)	1:00:12.26
High jump	Gabriela Carrillo (ESA)	1.68	Kay-De Vaughn (BIZ)	1.65	Alejandra Gómez (CRC)	1.62
Pole vault	Peggy Ovalle (GUA)	3.30 CR	María José Rodas (GUA)	3.00	Gladys Quijada (ESA)	2.75
Long jump	Sabrina Asturias (GUA)	5.68 CR (wind: -2.3 m/s)	Tricia Flores (BIZ)	5.65 (wind: -1.1 m/s)	Gabriela Carrillo (ESA)	5.51 (wind: -2.3 m/s)
Triple jump	Gabriela Carrillo (ESA)	12.49 (wind: -1.1 m/s)	Sabrina Asturias (GUA)	11.88 (wind: +0.4 m/s)	Tricia Flores (BIZ)	11.88 (wind: -0.4 m/s)
Shot put	Natyan Caetano (PAN)	12.82 CR	Doroty López (GUA)	12.38	Aixa Middleton (PAN)	11.41
Discus throw	Aixa Middleton (PAN)	43.15	Doroty López (GUA)	40.18	Viviana Abarca (CRC)	37.11
Hammer throw	Viviana Abarca (CRC)	41.73	Ana Carolina Granados (ESA)	39.04	Jéssica Gómez (HON)	39.00
Javelin throw	Dalila Rugama (NCA)	50.35	Ángela Téllez (NCA)	38.87	Milena González (PAN)	33.39
Heptathlon	Dilian Ramírez (CRC)	3739	Patricia Montes (ESA)	3326	Jennifer Ovares (CRC)	3240

== Medal table (unofficial) ==
Rank	Nation	Gold	Silver	Bronze	Total
1	Guatemala (GUA)	11	10	6	27
2	El Salvador (ESA)	7	12	9	28
3	Panama (PAN)	6	1	7	14
4	Honduras (HON)	3	1	1	5
5	Nicaragua (NIC)	2	7	5	14
6	Belize (BIZ)	0	4	2	6
Totals (6 entries)		29	35	30	94

=== Note ===
^{†}: Women's 3000 metres steeplechase and heptathlon might have been treated as exhibition because of the low number of participants (only 2 and 3 athletes, respectively). This could explain the difference between a published medal table and the unofficial count above for Costa Rica and El Salvador.

== Team Ranking ==
Costa Rica won the overall team ranking.

=== Total ===
The host country is highlighted in lavender blue

Rank	Nation	Points
1st place, gold medalist(s)	Costa Rica	382
2nd place, silver medalist(s)	Guatemala	277
3rd place, bronze medalist(s)	El Salvador	246
