= Juan Carlos Nájera =

Personal information
- Born: February 13, 1981 (age 45)

Sport
- Country: Guatemala
- Sport: Athletics
- Event: Triple jump
- Updated on 29 July 2014

Juan Carlos Nájera (13 February 1981) is a triple jumper and coach born in the Guatemalan department of Zacapa. He began his career in 1992 when his older brother took him to compete in a 100m race, motivating him to continue in athletics. He studied at the Institute of Business Administration in Zacapa and the Universidad de San Carlos de Guatemala, where he earned a BA in Biology.

== Personal bests ==
- Long jump: 7.16 m – Guatemala City, 7 Jul 2007
- Triple jump: 15.78 m – Guatemala City, 6 Jul 2007

== Achievements ==
Year	Competition	Venue	Position	Event	Notes
Representing the Guatemala
2001	Central American and Caribbean Championships	Guatemala City, Guatemala	9th	Triple jump	13.60
2002	Central American Championships	San José, Costa Rica	3rd	Long jump	6.57
2002	Central American Championships	San José, Costa Rica	3rd	Triple jump	14.42
2002	Central American Championships	San José, Costa Rica	2nd	4x100m relay	42.83
2002	Central American and Caribbean Games	San Salvador, El Salvador	—	Triple jump	NM
2003	Central American Championships	Ciudad de Guatemala, Guatemala	3rd	Triple jump	14.44 (wind: +0.1 m/s)
2004	Central American Championships	Managua, Nicaragua	1st	Triple jump	15.15
2005	Central American Championships	San José, Costa Rica	4th	Long jump	6.61
2005	Central American Championships	San José, Costa Rica	2nd	Triple jump	14.78 (wind: -2.2 m/s)
2005	Central American Championships	San José, Costa Rica	3rd	4x100m relay	42.40
2005	Central American and Caribbean Championships	Nassau, Bahamas	9th	Triple jump	13.92 w
2006	Central American Games	Managua, Nicaragua	2nd	Triple jump	15.37
2006	Ibero-American Championships	Ponce, Puerto Rico	7th	Triple jump	14.57
2006	Central American and Caribbean Games	Cartagena, Colombia	12th	Triple jump	14.44 (wind: +0.8 m/s)
2007	Central American Championships	San José, Costa Rica	1st	Triple jump	15.49 (wind: +1.9 m/s)
2007	Central American Championships	San José, Costa Rica	4th	4x100m relay	42.52
2007	NACAC Championships	San Salvador, El Salvador	10th	Long jump	6.75 (wind: +0.6 m/s)
2007	NACAC Championships	San Salvador, El Salvador	4th	Triple jump	15.58 (wind: -1.1 m/s)
2007	Universiade	Bangkok, Thailand	36th (q)	Long jump	6.64
2007	Universiade	Bangkok, Thailand	12th	Triple jump	15.42 (wind: -0.1 m/s)
2008	Ibero-American Championships	Iquique, Chile	4th	Triple jump	14.95 (wind: -0.2 m/s)
2008	Central American Championships	San Pedro Sula, Honduras	2nd	Long jump	6.99 (NWI)
2008	Central American Championships	San Pedro Sula, Honduras	1st	Triple jump	15.45 (NWI)
2008	Central American Championships	San Pedro Sula, Honduras	2nd	4x100m relay	42.30
2008	Central American and Caribbean Championships	Cali, Colombia	7th	Triple jump	15.24 (wind: -0.5 m/s)
2009	Central American Championships	Guatemala City, Guatemala	4th	Long jump	6.99 (wind: +0.1 m/s)
2009	Central American Championships	Guatemala City, Guatemala	2nd	Triple jump	15.32 (NWI)
2009	Universiade	Belgrade, Serbia	26th (q)	Triple jump	14.94 (wind: +0.5 m/s)
2010	Central American and Caribbean Games	Mayagüez, Puerto Rico	12th	Triple jump	14.90 (wind: +0.4 m/s)
2010	Central American Championships	Guatemala City, Guatemala	6th	Long jump	6.97 w (wind: +3.2 m/s)
2010	Central American Championships	Guatemala City, Guatemala	2nd	Triple jump	15.06 (wind: +0.6 m/s)
2012	Central American Championships	Managua, Nicaragua	5th	Long jump	6.36
2012	Central American Championships	Managua, Nicaragua	3rd	Triple jump	14.50

== Further results as an athlete ==
2007

- 1st place. University of Miami Open, USA: 15.35m
- 1st place. 1st Central America, Dominican Republic and Puerto Rico Athletic Meet, Guatemala city, Guatemala: 15.78m
