= Athletics at the 2006 Central American Games =

Athletics at the VIII Central American Games
- Dates: March 4-7
- Host city: Managua, Nicaragua
- Venue: Estadio Olímpico del Instituto Nicaragüense de Juventud y Deporte
- Level: Senior
- Events: 36 (21 men, 15 women)
- Participation: 4 nations
- Records set: 5 games records

Athletics competitions at the 2006 Central American Games were held at the Estadio Olímpico del Instituto Nicaragüense de Juventud y Deporte in Managua, Nicaragua, between March 4-7, 2006.

In total, 36 events were contested, 21 by men and 15 by women. A report on the results was given.

== Records ==
5 games records were set, among them 2 in events that were only held at this edition of the games. In addition, 5 new national records and 3 national junior records were set.

== Medal summary ==
Results were published on the webpage of the Central American Isthmus Athletic Confederation (Spanish: Confederación Atlética del Istmo Centroamericano) CADICA and on the CACAC webpage. Gold medal winners were also published elsewhere.

=== Men ===
Event	Gold		Silver		Bronze	
100 metres	Rolando Palacios (HON)	10.60	Miguel Flores (HON)	11.02	Denis Gutiérrez (NCA)	11.05
200 metres	Rolando Palacios (HON)	21.22 NR	Jorge Conde (NCA)	22.03	Alex Geovany Navas (HON)	22.06
400 metres	Jonnie Lowe (HON)	48.53	Camilo Quevedo (GUA)	49.72	Jorge Conde (NCA)	49.87
800 metres	Jenner Pelico (GUA)	1:53.6	Camilo Quevedo (GUA)	1:54.9	José Rosas (HON)	1:58.0
1500 metres	José Rosas (HON)	4:23.06	Álvaro Vázquez (NCA)	4:23.15		
5000 metres	Christian Villavicencio (NCA)	15:19.25	Aldosman Castro (NCA)	16:31.37		
10,000 metres	Christian Villavicencio (NCA)	31:45.63	Edwin Cerrato (HON)	33:31.48	Aldosman Castro (NCA)	35:02.69
20,000 metres	Miguel Toruño (NCA)	1:11:45.39 GR	Gustavo Rodríguez (NCA)	1:11:58.70		
3000 metres steeplechase	Pedro Tohom (GUA)	9:53.25	Luis Treminio (NCA)	10:19.05	Nitzar Sandoval (NCA)	11:04.23
110 metres hurdles (wind: 2.8 m/s)	Jorge González (HON)	14.68 w	Hans Villagrán (GUA)	14.85 w	Luis Carlos Bonilla (GUA)	14.87 w
400 metres hurdles	Jonnie Lowe (HON)	51.77 GR NR	Camilo Quevedo (GUA)	53.37	Emilio Morales (NCA)	57.68
4 x 100 metres relay	Honduras; Rolando Palacios; Jonnie Lowe; Ronald Bennett; Alex Geovany Navas	41.63 NR				
4 x 400 metres relay	Nicaragua; Jorge Conde; Hermán López; Ponce; Martinez	3:20.61				
10 Kilometres Road Walk	Melvin González (NCA)	1:03:20.03 GR				
High jump	Darwin Colón (HON)	1.86	Dayris García (NCA)	1.75	Joel Wade (BIZ)	1.60
Long jump	Maxwell Álvarez (GUA)	7.39	Darwin Colón (HON)	6.30	Joel Wade (BIZ)	6.09
Triple jump	Maxwell Álvarez (GUA)	15.91 GR NR	Juan Carlos Nájera (GUA)	15.37	Kessel Campbell (HON)	14.59
Shot put	Milton Cisne (NCA)	11.97	Moisés Quintanilla (NCA)	11.65		
Discus throw	Raúl Rivera (GUA)	46.34	Ricardo Madriz (NCA)	38.02	Moisés Quintanilla (NCA)	37.03
Hammer throw	Raúl Rivera (GUA)	59.39	Diego Berríos (GUA)	50.83	Enrique Reina (HON)	49.62
Javelin throw	Rigoberto Calderón (NCA)	66.64	Kenley Olivos (NCA)	64.10	Darwin Colón (HON)	45.12

=== Women ===
Event	Gold		Silver		Bronze	
100 metres	Auxiliadora Lacayo (NCA)	12.15 NR	Mirtha Martínez (HON)	12.23 NRj	Francisca Martínez (GUA)	12.45
200 metres	Auxiliadora Lacayo (NCA)	25.61	Jéssica Lino (HON)	26.01 NRj	Henriette Guadamuz (NCA)	26.66
400 metres	Jessica Aguilera (NCA)	58.78	Henriette Guadamuz (NCA)	61.78		
800 metres	Yubelikis Casco (NCA)	2:20.21	Teresa Sánchez (NCA)	2:35.26		
1500 metres	Yubelikis Casco (NCA)	4:59.79	Cony Villalobos (NCA)	5:19.60		
5000 metres	Estella Zúñiga (NCA)	19:13.5	Rafaela Hernández (NCA)	19:18.0		
100 metres hurdles (wind: 2.1 m/s)	Jeimy Bernárdez (HON)	14.18 w	Jéssica Lino (HON)	16.09 w	Auxiliadora Lacayo (NCA)	16.65 w
400 metres hurdles	Jessica Aguilera (NCA)	65.69	Agne Oporta (NCA)	75.12	Kimberly Baltazar (GUA)	76.42
4 x 100 metres relay	Nicaragua; Álvarez; Henriette Guadamuz; Auxiliadora Lacayo; Jessica Aguilera	49.13	Honduras; Mirtha Martínez; Samanta Fernández; Jeimy Bernárdez; Jéssica Lino	49.51		
4 x 400 metres relay	Nicaragua; Jessica Aguilera; Henriette Guadamuz; Yubelikis Casco; Katia Cecilia Osorio	4:02.50	Honduras; Mirtha Martínez; Samanta Fernández; Jeimy Bernárdez; Jéssica Lino	4:47.89		
Long jump	Francisca Martínez (GUA)	5.52	Inaly Morazán (NCA)	4.85 NRj	Katia Cecilia Osorio (NCA)	4.73
Triple jump	María Teresa Chamorro (NCA)	10.08				
Shot put	Dalila Rugama (NCA)	11.09	Ileana Joyner (NCA)	10.45		
Discus throw	María Lourdes Ruiz (NCA)	42.18				
Javelin throw	Dalila Rugama (NCA)	49.48	Jannis Ramírez (NCA)	48.58	Kimberly Baltazar (GUA)	35.38

== Medal table (unofficial) ==
Published medal counts slightly differ from each other and from the unofficial medal count below.

* Host nation (Nicaragua)

Rank	Nation	Gold	Silver	Bronze	Total
1	Nicaragua*	20	17	9	46
2	Honduras	9	8	5	22
3	Guatemala	7	6	4	17
4	Belize	0	0	2	2
Totals (4 entries)		36	31	20	87
