= Athletics at the 2010 Central American Games =

Athletics at the IX Central American Games
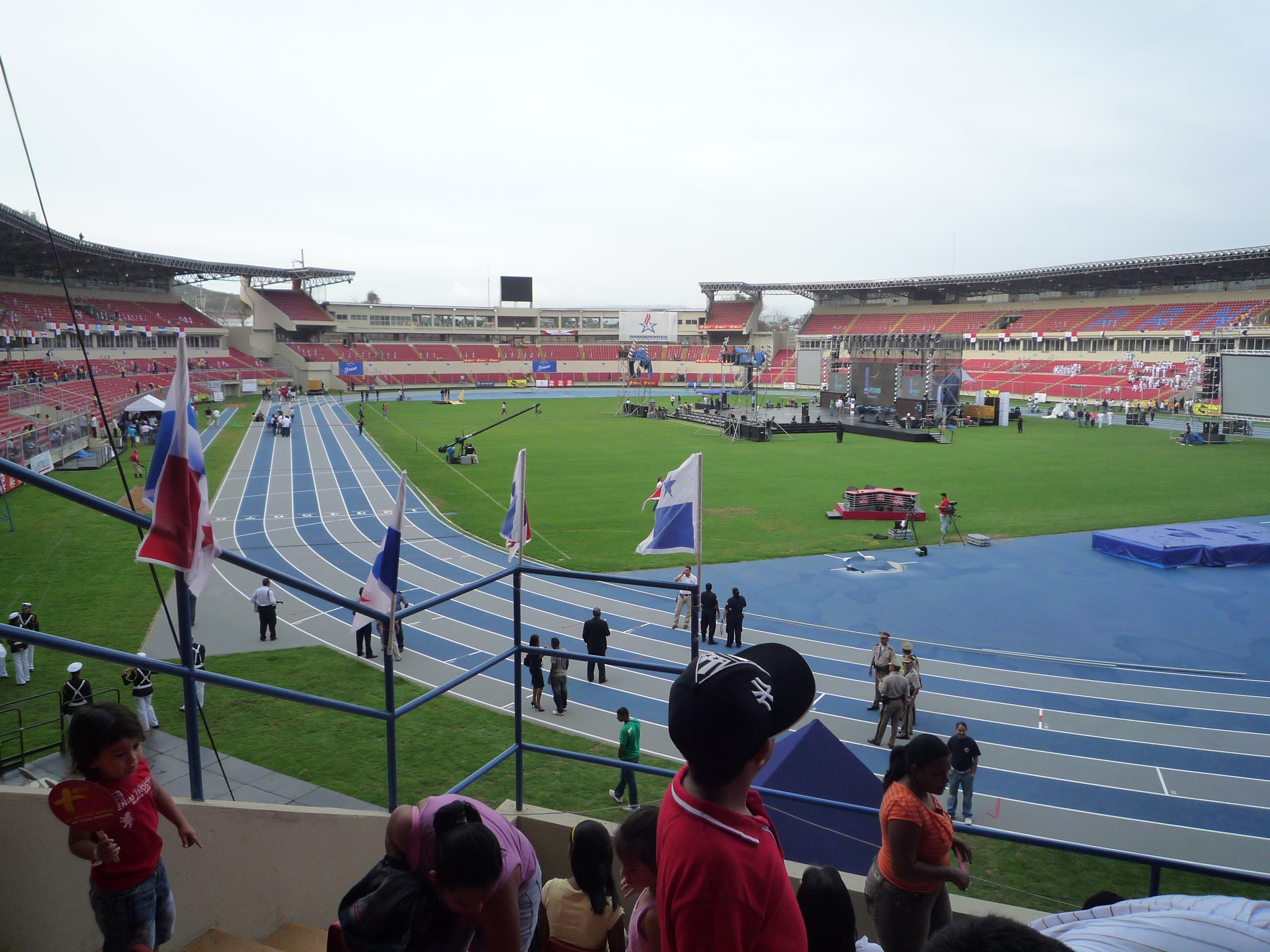
- Estadio Rommel Fernández, Panama City, Panama
- Dates: April 16–19
- Host city: Panama City, Panama
- Venue: Estadio Rommel Fernández
- Level: Senior
- Events: 39 (20 men, 19 women)
- Participation: 114 athletes from 6 nations
- Records set: 13 Games records

Athletics competitions at the 2010 Central American Games were held at the Estadio Rommel Fernández in Panama City, Panama, on April 16–19, 2010.

A total of 39 events were contested, 20 by men and 19 by women. Although initially scheduled, 8 events were finally cancelled: 35 km Walk, Hammer Throw, Pole Vault, and Marathon for men, and 10 km Walk, Triple Jump, Pole Vault, and Marathon for women.

== Records ==
13 new games records were set.

Event	Record	Athlete	Country	Type
Men
100 m	10.24s (-0.2 m/s)	Alonso Edward	Panama	GR
200 m	20.84s (0.1 m/s)	Rolando Palacios	Honduras	GR
400 m	47.21s	Nery Brenes	Costa Rica	GR
110 m hurdles	14.15s (0.0 m/s)	Ronald Bennett	Honduras	GR
400 m hurdles	50.53s	Jonathan Williams	Belize	GR
4 × 400 m relay	3:12.41	Arnoldo Monge; Gary Robinson; Nery Brenes; Víctor Cantillano	Costa Rica	GR
Long jump	8.19m (0.0 m/s)	Irving Saladino	Panama	GR
Women
800 m	2:02.52	Andrea Ferris	Panama	GR
1500 m	4:18.38	Andrea Ferris	Panama	GR
100 m hurdles	14.55s (-0.5 m/s)	Jeimy Bernárdez	Honduras	GR
3000 m steeplechase	10:13.20	Andrea Ferris	Panama	GR
Long jump	5.97 m (-2.0 m/s)	Tricia Flores	Belize	GR
Heptathlon	4.241pts	Alejandra Gómez	Costa Rica	GR

Key

AR — Area record • GR — Championship record • NR — National record

== Medal summary ==
The official website is no longer available, but a couple of pages were archived.

Medal winners as shown below were published in various sources: On the webpage of the Central American Isthmus Athletic Confederation (Spanish: Confederación Atlética del Istmo Centroamericano) CADICA. Results from the first three days were compiled from the CACAC webpage. Medal winners were published on the webpage of the Panamanian Sports Institute (Spanish: Instituto Panameño de Deportes).

=== Men ===
Event	Gold		Silver		Bronze	
100 metres (wind: -0.2 m/s)	Alonso Edward (PAN)	10.24 GR	Rolando Palacios (HON)	10.36	Mateo Edward (PAN)	10.78
200 meters (wind: 0.1 m/s)	Rolando Palacios (HON)	20.84 GR	Takeshi Fujiwara (ESA)	21.62	Josef Norales (HON)	21.84
400 meters	Nery Brenes (CRC)	47.21 GR	Takeshi Fujiwara (ESA)	47.70	Pedro Suazo (HON)	47.99
800 meters	Edgard Cortés (NCA)	1:53.19	Arnoldo Monge (CRC)	1:53.20	Marcos Pérez (CRC)	1:54.27
1500 meters	Marcos Pérez (CRC)	4:01.77	Álvaro Vásquez (NCA)	4:04.17	Irving Sánchez (PAN)	4:08.29
5000 meters	William Sánchez (ESA)	15:37.14	Dimas Castro (NCA)	15:56.24	Jonathan Cerrud (PAN)	16:29.60
10,000 meters	William Sánchez (ESA)	32:57.32	Jonathan Cerrud (PAN)	33:15.21	Dimas Castro (NCA)	34:13.95
110 meter hurdles (wind: 0.0 m/s)	Ronald Bennett (HON)	14.15 GR	Jonathan Williams (BIZ)	14.18	Renan Palma (ESA)	14.38
400 meter hurdles	Jonathan Williams (BIZ)	50.53 GR	Jonathan Gibson (PAN)	52.05	Lenín Vanegas (NCA)	54.74
3000 m steeplechase	Álvaro Vásquez (NCA)	9:28.43	Douglas Aguilar (ESA)	9:40.36	Jonathan Cerrud (PAN)	10:05.40
4×100 meter relay	Panama; Jonathan Romero; Mateo Edward; Jonathan Gibson; Jhamal Bowen	41.69	Costa Rica; Victor Cantillano; Arnoldo Monge; Michael Guerrero	42.16		
4×400 meter relay	Costa Rica; Arnoldo Monge; Gary Robinson; Nery Brenes; Víctor Cantillano	3:12.41 GR	Panama; Andrés Rodríguez; Jonathan Gibson; Luis Hassan; Lino Pérez	3:21.74	Nicaragua; Benjamín Veliz; Daniel Alemán; Edgar Cortés; Lenín Vanegas	3:28:29
20 km race walk	Allan Segura (CRC)	1:34:12.15	Jassir Cabrera (PAN)	1:40:24.10	Gerardo Lee (PAN)	1:48:31.00
High jump	Marion Colorado (ESA)	2.06	Henry Linton (CRC)	2.03	Anselmo Delgado (PAN)	1.90
Long jump	Irving Saladino (PAN)	8.19 (wind: 0.0 m/s) GR	Jhamal Bowen (PAN)	7.72 (wind: 0.0 m/s)	Kessell Campbell (HON)	7.19 (wind: -0.4 m/s)
Triple jump	Michael Thompson (PAN)	15.37	Jonathan Romero (PAN)	15.25	Jason Castro (HON)	15.17
Shot put	Juan Alvarez (HON)	13.75	Nelson Chavarría (CRC)	12.84	Esteban Caballero (PAN)	12.45
Discus throw	Winston Campbell (HON)	45.23	Nelson Chavarría (CRC)	45.04	Juan Galdamez (ESA)	43.77
Javelin throw	Rigoberto Calderón (NCA)	61.91	Julio Lojo (PAN)	60.79	Benigno Ortega (PAN)	59.62
Decathlon	Alberto Perriman (PAN)	5,274	Allan Isaac (HON)	4,992	Jorge Mena (PAN)	4,867

=== Women ===
Event	Gold		Silver		Bronze	
100 metres (wind: 0.2 m/s)	Kaina Martínez (BIZ)	12.05	Mardel Alvarado (PAN)	12.38	Shantelly Scott (CRC)	12.42
200 meters (wind: 0.5 m/s)	Kaina Martínez (BIZ)	24.89	Tracy Joseph Hamblin (CRC)	25.12	Natalia Santamaría (ESA)	25.30
400 meters	Kathi Cuadra (NCA)	56.25	Sharolyn Scott (CRC)	56.75	Yelena Alvear (PAN)	57.71
800 meters	Andrea Ferris (PAN)	2:02.52 GR	Rolanda Bell (PAN)	2:10.12	Gladys Landaverde (ESA)	2:12.04
1500 meters	Andrea Ferris (PAN)	4:18.38 GR	Rolanda Bell (PAN)	4:26.09	Gladys Landaverde (ESA)	4:26.58
5000 meters	María Ferris (PAN)	18:04.51	Mónica Vargas (CRC)	18:39.14	Aldy Villalobos (NCA)	18:58.62
10,000 meters	Gabriela Traña (CRC)	37:31.17	María Ferris (PAN)	38:20.86	Aldy Villalobos (NCA)	42:26.85
100 meter hurdles (wind: -0.5 m/s)	Jeimy Bernárdez (HON)	14.55 GR	Ana Porras (CRC)	15.90	Migdalia Morgan (PAN)	17.32
400 meter hurdles	Sharolyn Scott (CRC)	61.51	Jessica Aguilera (NCA)	63.63	Gabriela Guevara (PAN)	64.26
3000 m steeplechase	Andrea Ferris (PAN)	10:13.20 GR	Blanca Solís (ESA)	12:08.14	Yelka Mairena (NCA)	12:27.51
4×100 meter relay	Costa Rica; Alejandra Gómez; Shantelly Scott; Mariela Leal; Tracy Joseph Hamblin	48.45	Panama; Kashany Ríos; Yelena Alvear; Migdalia Morgan; Mardel Alvarado	48.85	Nicaragua; Janahi Cornejo; Jessica Aguilera; Kathi Cuadra; Vanesa Romero	49.20
4×400 meter relay	Panama; Yelena Alvear; Mardel Alvarado; Rolanda Bell; Andrea Ferris	3:50.53	Nicaragua; Ingrid Narvaez; Jessica Aguilera; Kathi Cuadra; Vanessa Romero	3:52.49	Costa Rica; Mariela Leal; Shantelly Scott; Sharolyn Scott; Tracy Joseph Hamblin	3:54.83
High jump	Alejandra Gómez (CRC)	1.70	Kachany Ríos (PAN)	1.60		
Long jump	Tricia Flores (BIZ)	5.97 (wind: -2.0 m/s) GR	Kaina Martínez (BIZ)	5.49 (wind: 0.9 m/s)	Gabriela Guevara (PAN)	5.15 (wind: 0.0 m/s)
Shot put	Aixa Middleton (PAN)	11.74	Silvia Pinar (CRC)	11.26	Elena Lojo (PAN)	10.91
Discus throw	Aixa Middleton (PAN)	47.10	Silvia Pinar (CRC)	38.26	Viviana Abarca (CRC)	37.71
Hammer throw	Viviana Abarca (CRC)	46.37	Elena Lojo (PAN)	44.12	Ana Harry (HON)	39.91
Javelin throw	Rocío Navarro (PAN)	46.46	Lorena Medina (ESA)	42.71	Génova Arias (CRC)	38.29
Heptathlon	Alejandra Gómez (CRC)	4.241 GR	Inaly Morazán (NCA)	3.887	Lilian Koo (PAN)	2.642

== Medal table (unofficial) ==
* Host nation (Panama)

Rank	Nation	Gold	Silver	Bronze	Total
1	Panama*	13	14	15	42
2	Costa Rica	10	11	5	26
3	Honduras	5	2	5	12
4	Nicaragua	4	5	7	16
5	Belize	4	2	0	6
6	El Salvador	3	5	5	13
Totals (6 entries)		39	39	37	115

== Participation ==
According to an unofficial count, 114 athletes from 6 countries participated.

- Belize (6)
- Costa Rica (21)
- El Salvador (10)
- Honduras (13)
- Nicaragua (19)
- Panama (45)
