= Jonnie Lowe =

Honduran sprinter (born 1979)

Personal information
- Born: 1 October 1979 (age 46)

Sport
- Sport: Track and field
Medal record
Representing Honduras
Central American Games
Gold medal – first place	2006 Managua	400m
Gold medal – first place	2006 Managua	400m hurdles

Jonnie Eduardo Lowe Henríquez (born 1 October 1979) is a Honduran track and field athlete who competes in the 400 metres and 400-metres hurdles. Lowe is best known for setting the Honduran record in the 400 m hurdles with a time of 51.77 at the 2006 Central American Games in Managua, Nicaragua.
