= Central American Championships in Athletics =

Athletic event

The Central American Championships in Athletics (Campeonatos Centroamericanos Mayores) is an athletics event organized by the Confederación Atlética del Istmo Centroamericano CADICA (Central American Isthmus Athletic Confederation) open for athletes from member associations.

== Team ranking ==
There is an overall winner in the team ranking based on points awarded for the athlete's placings. Moreover, there are winners in team ranking in the men's and women's categories. The point system changed over the years. At first, points were awarded for athletes on the first 6 places (6 points for 1st place, 5 points for 2nd place, ..., 1 point for 6th place). Starting in the mid 70s, points were awarded for athletes on the first 8 places (9 points for 1st place, 7 points for 2nd place, ..., 1 point for 8th place). From 2009 on, points were only awarded for athletes on the first 4 places (5 points for 1st place, 3 points for 2nd place, 2 points for 3rd place, and 1 point for 4th place).

== Editions ==
The following list was compiled from the CADICA website, and from a variety of articles from the archive of Costa Rican newspaper La Nación, and Guatemalan newspaper Prensa Libre.

	Year	City	Country	Date	Venue	No. of Events	Winner Team Ranking
1st	1958	Guatemala City	Guatemala	September 27–29	Estadio Mateo Flores	26	Guatemala
2nd	1965	San Salvador	El Salvador				
3rd	1967	Guatemala City	Guatemala	April 7–9	Estadio Mateo Flores		
4th	1968	Managua	Nicaragua	March 15–18	Estadio Somoza		
5th	1970	Guatemala City	Guatemala	December 4–6	Estadio Mateo Flores		
6th	1971	San José	Costa Rica	November 19–21	Pista Eduardo Garnier		Costa Rica
7th	1972	Panama City	Panama	November 24–26	Estadio Revolución		Panama
8th	1975	San José	Costa Rica	November 26–29	Estadio Nacional	36	Costa Rica
9th	1980	Guatemala City	Guatemala	November 5–8	Estadio Mateo Flores	38	Guatemala
10th	1984	Guatemala City	Guatemala	August 15–18	Estadio Mateo Flores	40	Guatemala
11th	1991	Tegucigalpa	Honduras	June 27–28		39	Guatemala
12th	1996						
13th	1998	Guatemala City	Guatemala	November 17–18	Estadio Mateo Flores	42	
14th	2002	San José	Costa Rica	October 12–13	Estadio Nacional	38	Costa Rica
15th	2003	Guatemala City	Guatemala	June 20–21	Estadio Cementos Progreso	41	Guatemala
16th	2004	Managua	Nicaragua	September 25–26	Estadio de Atletismo del Instituto Nicaragüense de Deportes	42	Costa Rica
17th	2005	San José	Costa Rica	June 3–4	Estadio Nacional	44	Costa Rica
18th	2007	San José	Costa Rica	June 8–9	Estadio Nacional	44	Costa Rica
19th	2008	San Pedro Sula	Honduras	June 27–28	Estadio Olímpico Metropolitano	43	Guatemala
20th	2009	Guatemala City	Guatemala	June 12–13	Estadio Cementos Progreso	40	Guatemala
21st	2010	Guatemala City	Guatemala	September 17–18	Estadio Mateo Flores	40	Guatemala
22nd	2011	San José	Costa Rica	June 24–26	Estadio Nacional	43	Costa Rica
23rd	2012	Managua	Nicaragua	June 15–17	Estadio de Atletismo del Instituto Nicaragüense de Deportes	44	Costa Rica
24th	2013	Managua	Nicaragua	June 21–23	Estadio de Atletismo del Instituto Nicaragüense de Deportes	43	Costa Rica
25th	2014	Tegucigalpa	Honduras	June 20–22	Estadio Olímpico Palacio de los Deportes UNAH	44	Guatemala
26th	2015	Managua	Nicaragua	June 26–28	Estadio de Atletismo del Instituto Nicaragüense de Deportes	44	El Salvador
27th	2016	San Salvador	El Salvador	June 17–19	Estadio Jorge "Mágico" González	44	Guatemala
28th	2017	Tegucigalpa	Honduras	June 30 – July 2	Estadio Olimpico José Simon Ascona	44	Panama
29th	2018	Guatemala City	Guatemala	July 13–14	Estadio Doroteo Guamuch Flores	44	Costa Rica
30th	2019	Managua	Nicaragua	June 22–23	Estadio de Atletismo del Instituto Nicaragüense de Deportes	44	Costa Rica
31st	2020	San José	Costa Rica	December 28–29	Estadio Nacional		
32nd	2021	San José	Costa Rica	June 26–27	Estadio Nacional		
33rd	2022	Managua	Nicaragua	July 2–3	Estadio Olímpico del IND Managua		
34th	2023	San José	Costa Rica	May 6–7	Estadio Nacional		
35th	2024	San Salvador	El Salvador	June 28–29	Estadio Jorge "El Mágico" González	44	
36th	2025	Managua	Nicaragua	August 2–3	Estadio Olímpico del IND Managua		
37th	2026	Managua	Nicaragua	June 6–7	Estadio Olímpico del IND Managua	46	

== See also ==
- List of Central American Championships records
