= 2012 Central American Junior and Youth Championships in Athletics =

XXV Central American Junior and XX Central American Youth Championships in Athletics
- Dates: May 25–27
- Host city: San Salvador, El Salvador
- Venue: Estadio Nacional Flor Blanca "Magico Gonzalez"
- Level: Junior and Youth
- Events: 83 (42 boys, 41 girls)
- Participation: 301 athletes from 7 nations
- Records set: 20

The 2012 Central American Junior and Youth Championships in Athletics were held at the Estadio Nacional Flor Blanca "Magico Gonzalez" in San Salvador, El Salvador, between May 25–27, 2012. Organized by the Central American Isthmus Athletic Confederation (CADICA), it was the 25th edition of the Junior (U-20) and the 20th edition of the Youth (U-18) competition. A total of 83 events were contested, 42 by boys and 41 by girls. A total of 20 new championship records were set. Overall winner on points was Costa Rica.

== Medal summary ==
Complete results can be found on the CADICA webpage.

=== Junior ===
==== Boys (U-20) ====
| Event | Gold | | Silver | | Bronze | |
|---|---|---|---|---|---|---|
| 100 metres (wind: -0.1 m/s) | Mateo Edward (PAN) | 10.46 CR | Helson Pitillo (HON) | 11.20 | Arren Roches (BIZ) | 11.31 |
| 200 metres (wind: +1.5 m/s) | Mateo Edward (PAN) | 21.36 | Jairo Guerra (GUA) | 22.33 | Cristian Gerardo Martínez (GUA) | 22.75 |
| 400 metres | Cesar Andrey Vásquez (CRC) | 48.43 | Luis Alonso Murillo (CRC) | 48.55 | Francisco Urquilla (ESA) | 51.46 |
| 800 metres | Víctor Emilio Ortiz (CRC) | 1:51.42 CR | David Hodgson (CRC) | 1:57.34 | Néstor Mijangos (GUA) | 2:01.50 |
| 1500 metres | Edwin Pirir (ESA) | 4:09.57 | Jorge Alberto Viera (PAN) | 4:10.17 | Néstor Mijangos (GUA) | 4:11.48 |
| 5000 metres | Edwin Pirir (ESA) | 15:17.9 CR | Germán Rivas (CRC) | 15:30.6 | Walter Yac (GUA) | 15:47.0 |
| 10000 metres | Edwin Pirir (ESA) | 31:21.51 CR | Germán Rivas (CRC) | 32:47.63 | Walter Yac (GUA) | 33:25.19 |
| 110 metres hurdles (wind: +1.9 m/s) | Gerber Blanco (GUA) | 14.30 | José Chorro (ESA) | 14.31 | Williams Ríos (PAN) | 14.73 |
| 400 metres hurdles | Gerald Drummond (CRC) | 52.49 | Gerber Blanco (GUA) | 53.35 | José Chorro (ESA) | 53.68 |
| High jump | Elías Mora (CRC) | 1.90 | William Figueroa (CRC) | 1.84 | Adrián René Flores (HON) | 1.81 |
| Pole vault | César Chávez (ESA) | 4.10 | Josué Berrocal (CRC) | 3.70 | | |
| Long jump | Juan Mosquera (PAN) | 7.11 | Jairo Guerra (GUA) | 6.50 | Cristian Brooks (PAN) | 6.23 |
| Triple jump | Juan Mosquera (PAN) | 14.18 | Adrián René Flores (HON) | 14.06 | | |
| Shot put | Bryan Méndez (CRC) | 14.79 | Ronald Alvarenga (ESA) | 14.37 | Justin Owen Awe (BIZ) | 13.72 |
| Discus throw | Alberto Peralta (PAN) | 44.27 | Bryan Méndez (CRC) | 41.65 | Ever Acajabon (GUA) | 39.89 |
| Hammer throw | Enrique Gaitán (GUA) | 58.55 CR | Luis Diego Villarreal (CRC) | 39.88 | Darwin Vanegas (NCA) | 35.26 |
| Javelin throw | Anastacio Buitrago (PAN) | 57.95 CR | Pablo Cuadra (NCA) | 56.96 | Wilberth Orias (CRC) | 47.07 |
| Decathlon | Marcio Cruz (NCA) | 4815 | Robert Ibarra (CRC) | 4515 | Emanuelle Ruiz (CRC) | 3240 |
| 10000 metres Walk | Luis Ángel Sánchez (GUA) | 45:12.04 | José Gregorio Ajcam (GUA) | 46:16.17 | Luis Alfonso López (ESA) | 46:56.11 |
| 4 x 100 metres relay | Panama; Cristian Brooks; Juan Mosquera; Williams Ríos; Mateo Edward | 42.21 | Costa Rica; Cesar Andrey Vásquez; Jefferson Matamoros; David Hodgson; Jean Carlos Ramírez | 43.11 | El Salvador; Mario Alejandro Mancia; Francisco Urquilla; José Chorro; César Alonso Chávez | 43.86 |
| 4 x 400 metres relay | Costa Rica; Gerald Drummond; Cesar Andrey Vásquez; David Hodgson; Luis Alonso Murillo | 3:13.51 CR | El Salvador; Francisco Urquilla; José Chorro; César Alonso Chávez; Mario Alejandro Mancia | 3:26.33 | Guatemala; Gerber Blanco; Cristian Gerardo Martínez; Jairo Guerra; Néstor Mijangos | 3:31.83 |

==== Girls (U-20) ====
| Event | Gold | | Silver | | Bronze | |
|---|---|---|---|---|---|---|
| 100 metres (wind: -1.9 m/s) | Sharolyn Josephs (CRC) | 12.52 | Diana Garita (CRC) | 12.89 | Fátima Aguirre (ESA) | 14.65 |
| 200 metres (wind: +0.9 m/s) | Glenda Davis (CRC) | 25.43 CR | Diana Garita (CRC) | 25.66 | Ingrid Narváez (NCA) | 26.05 |
| 400 metres | Ingrid Narváez (NCA) | 58.53 | Gabriela Guevara (PAN) | 59.64 | Jessica Sánchez (CRC) | 60.02 |
| 800 metres | María Fernanda Torres (CRC) | 2:22.90 | Elia Lazo (ESA) | 2:26.30 | Jaqueline Noemí Mejía (GUA) | 2:26.99 |
| 1500 metres | Elia Lazo (ESA) | 5:06.02 | Mishely Charo González (GUA) | 5:08.23 | Jaqueline Noemí Mejía (GUA) | 5:09.48 |
| 5000 metres | Kimberly Chali (GUA) | 18:54.12 | Mishely Charo González (GUA) | 19:54.36 | Tatiana Soto (CRC) | 20:07.52 |
| 100 metres hurdles (wind: +1.2 m/s) | María Renee Gómez (ESA) | 16.06 | Rosa Angélica Barrera (GUA) | 17.64 | Stephany Lorena Melgar (GUA) | 18.92 |
| 400 metres hurdles | Gabriela Guevara (PAN) | 65.44 | Stephany Lorena Melgar (GUA) | 73.22 | | |
| High jump | Ana María Martínez (PAN) | 1.61 | Ligia Patricia Paniagua (CRC) | 1.50 | Pamela Urieta (CRC) | 1.45 |
| Pole vault | Emely Monzón (GUA) | 2.80 | Fátima Aguirre (ESA) | 2.20 | | |
| Long jump | Cristina Aldana (GUA) | 5.62 (wind: +0.9 m/s) | Jessica Sánchez (CRC) | 5.59 (wind: +1.0 m/s) | María Renee Gómez (ESA) | 5.28 w (wind: +2.2 m/s) |
| Triple jump | Cristina Aldana (GUA) | 12.23 CR | Jessica Sánchez (CRC) | 11.50 | María Renee Gómez (ESA) | 11.39 |
| Shot put | Gisela Mabel Henríquez (PAN) | 11.45 | Yuleysy Mendoza (CRC) | 10.19 | Emma Paulina Castillo (GUA) | 9.69 |
| Discus throw | Gisela Mabel Henríquez (PAN) | 31.22 | Haydee Grijalba (CRC) | 30.85 | Emma Paulina Castillo (GUA) | 30.78 |
| Hammer throw | Ana Odeth Harry (HON) | 41.54 | Gabriela Guadalupe Mundo (ESA) | 40.37 | Yuleysy Mendoza (CRC) | 33.58 |
| Javelin throw | Haydee Grijalba (CRC) | 36.26 | Lourdes Guadalupe Medina (ESA) | 33.60 | Gorlee Semora Marin (BIZ) | 24.90 |
| Heptathlon | Jessica López (ESA) | 3949 | Melissa Gutiérrez (CRC) | 3528 | Rosa Barrera (GUA) | 2968 |
| 10000 metres Walk | Yesenia Miranda (ESA) | 53:24.58 | Priscilla Torres (CRC) | 1:05:39.04 | | |
| 4 x 100 metres relay | Costa Rica; Jessica Sánchez; Diana Garita; Glenda Davis; Sharolyn Josephs | 49.04 CR | Guatemala; Rosa Barrera; Cristina Aldana; Stephany Lorena Melgar; Emely Monzón | 53.68 | El Salvador; Jessica López; María Renee Gómez; Fátima Aguirre; Lourdes Guadalupe Medina | 54.51 |
| 4 x 400 metres relay | Costa Rica; Jessica Sánchez; Diana Garita; Glenda Davis; María Fernanda Torres | 3.58.80 | Guatemala; Mishely Charo González; Stephany Lorena Melgar; Cristina Aldana; Jaqueline Noemí Mejía | 4.28.75 | El Salvador; Jessica López; Ángela Vanesa Argueta; Elia Lazo; Tania Estefany Ponce | 4.35.84 |

=== Youth ===
==== Boys (U-18) ====
| Event | Gold | | Silver | | Bronze | |
|---|---|---|---|---|---|---|
| 100 metres (wind: -0.7 m/s) | Arturo Deliser (PAN) | 11.20 | Jaimar López (CRC) | 11.38 | Douglas Ricardo Orellana (GUA) | 11.58 |
| 200 metres (wind: +0.5 m/s) | Arturo Deliser (PAN) | 22.05 | Ángel Ramos (HON) | 22.90 | Joseph Hodgson (CRC) | 22.98 |
| 400 metres | José Abdul Demera (PAN) | 50.2 | Mariano Miranda (CRC) | 50.3 | Miguel Ortega (PAN) | 50.9 |
| 800 metres | Luis Gustavo Solórzano (ESA) | 1:56.92 | Juan Carlos Acosta (ESA) | 1:57.31 | Mario Francisco Melgar (GUA) | 1:58.25 |
| 1500 metres | Luis Gustavo Solórzano (ESA) | 4:13.39 | Edwin Alexander García (ESA) | 4:17.92 | Petter Vega (PAN) | 4:18.94 |
| 3000 metres | Luis Gustavo Solórzano (ESA) | 8:58.31 | José Enrique Calvo (CRC) | 9:26.73 | Edwin Alexander García (ESA) | 9:35.78 |
| 2000 metres steeplechase | David Alexander Escobar (ESA) | 6:23.87 | José Enrique Calvo (CRC) | 6:38.72 | Andrés Rivera (CRC) | 6:46.17 |
| 110 metres hurdles (wind: +1.4 m/s) | Ronald Edyberto Ramírez (GUA) | 14.65 | Andrés Acosta (CRC) | 14.74 | René Perla (ESA) | 14.99 |
| 400 metres hurdles | Mariano Miranda (CRC) | 56.31 | Miguel Ortega (PAN) | 57.04 | Gerardo Saúl Hernández (ESA) | 57.53 |
| High jump | Ronald Edyberto Ramírez (GUA) | 1.93m | Jaime Escobar (PAN) | 1.86m | Jaimar López (CRC) | 1.86m |
| Pole vault | Alejandro Rafael Melara (ESA) | 3.90m | Bryan Josué Melara (ESA) | 3.30m | Esvin Sánchez (GUA) | 3.00m |
| Long jump | Kevin Zelaya (ESA) | 6.38m | Alexford Terry (BIZ) | 6.24m | Oscar Porras (CRC) | 6.09m |
| Triple jump | Daniel Aldana (GUA) | 13.26m | Daniel Alberto Cabrera (GUA) | 13.23m | Lirisi Cayetano (BIZ) | 12.95m |
| Shot put | Hugo Antonio González (GUA) | 14.85m CR | Irving Villarreal (PAN) | 13.45m | José Omar Mora (NCA) | 13.16m |
| Discus throw | José Francisco Araya (CRC) | 45.79 CR | Magno Enrique Escobar (GUA) | 44.84 | José Carlos Ibarra (NCA) | 39.63 |
| Hammer throw | Otto Steve Vivas (GUA) | 47.45m | Magno Enrique Escobar (GUA) | 46.87m | Cesar Villarreal (CRC) | 43.25m |
| Javelin throw | Raylinds Delgado (NCA) | 58.58m CR | Marlon Pineda (NCA) | 50.31m | Carlos Rodríguez (HON) | 48.41 |
| Octathlon | Andrés Acosta (CRC) | 4976pts | Humberto Lugo (NCA) | 4850pts | Bryan Zelaya (ESA) | 4789pts |
| 10,000 metres Walk | Jürgen Grave (GUA) | 46:16.77 CR | Wilmer Santiago Rosales (GUA) | 51:41.00 | Alcides Esaú Rosales (ESA) | 54:43.30 |
| 4 x 100 metres relay | Panama; Abel García; José Abdul Demera; Miguel Ortega; Arturo Deliser | 43.82 CR | Costa Rica; Andrés Acosta; Jaimar López; Mariano Miranda; David Segura | 44.45 | Guatemala; Edward Haroldo Monzón; Carlos Alberto Paz; Jason Adonis Zepeda; Douglas Ricardo Orellana | 45.20 |
| 1000m Medley relay (100m x 200m x 300m x 400m) | Costa Rica; David Segura; Jaimar López; Joseph Hodgson; Mariano Miranda | 2:00.92 | Nicaragua; Humberto Lugo; Jorge Nicaragua; Marlon Pineda; Nestor Gómez | 2:04.41 | Guatemala; Ronald Edyberto Ramírez; Carlos Alberto Paz; Jason Adonis Zepeda; Manuel Alfredo Rivas | 2:04.65 |

==== Girls (U-18) ====
| Event | Gold | | Silver | | Bronze | |
|---|---|---|---|---|---|---|
| 100 metres (wind: -1.0 m/s) | Nathalee Aranda (PAN) | 12.75 | Katia Pozuelo (ESA) | 12.79 | Beatriz Flamenco (ESA) | 12.97 |
| 200 metres (wind: -0.1 m/s) | Katia Pozuelo (ESA) | 25.89 | Beatriz Flamenco (ESA) | 26.33 | Leyka Archibold (PAN) | 26.74 |
| 400 metres | Gina Zambrana (CRC) | 59.3 | Kianeth Galván (PAN) | 60.9 | Leyka Archibold (PAN) | 61.1 |
| 800 metres | Gina Zambrana (CRC) | 2:18.28 | Jacqueline Montoya (CRC) | 2:18.32 | Cora María Gutiérrez (GUA) | 2:21.75 |
| 1500 metres | Jacqueline Montoya (CRC) | 5:01.60 | María Floridalma Bac (GUA) | 5:02.15 | Josselyn Jazmín Grijalva (ESA) | 5:04.78 |
| 3000 metres | María Viera (PAN) | 11:08.46 | María Floridalma Bac (GUA) | 11:08.80 | Meyling Hernández (NCA) | 11:21.41 |
| 2000 metres steeplechase | Alejandra Hernández (CRC) | 7:56.01 CR | Xiomara Alemán (ESA) | 8:07.85 | Sara Gabriela Palacios (ESA) | 8:36.78 |
| 100 metres hurdles (wind: 1.2 m/s) | Naomi Smith (CRC) | 15.04 | | | | |
| 400 metres hurdles | Kianeth Galván (PAN) | 67.35 | Naomi Smith (CRC) | 68.47 | Catherine Ramos (ESA) | 68.53 |
| High jump | Stephanie Sofía Silva (GUA) | 1.59m | Eimy Campos (PAN) | 1.50m | María José Torres (CRC) | 1.45m |
| Pole vault | Andrea Velasco (ESA) | 2.75m CR | Catherine Ramos (ESA) | 2.55m | Karen Somoza (CRC) | 2.40m |
| Long jump | Nathalee Aranda (PAN) | 5.59m (NWI) | Rebeca Duarte (ESA) | 5.28m (wind: 1.0 m/s) | Marina Mosquera (PAN) | 4.99m (wind: -0.4 m/s) |
| Triple jump | Shanicka Augustine (BIZ) | 11.31m | Marina Mosquera (PAN) | 10.78m | Joan Deidre Wright (GUA) | 10.75m |
| Shot put | Gloria Serano (BIZ) | 12.93m CR | Ayleen González (PAN) | 12.15m | Sabrina Gaitán (GUA) | 12.12m |
| Discus throw | Ayleen González (PAN) | 35.64m | Sabrina Gaitán (GUA) | 35.25m | Gloria Serano (BIZ) | 31.16m |
| Hammer throw | Sabrina Gaitán (GUA) | 50.24m CR | Dagmar Alvarado (PAN) | 43.68m | Roxana Lourdes Pleites (ESA) | 33.92m |
| Javelin throw | Hazel Bonilla (NCA) | 29.30m | Sandra Verónica Rivas (ESA) | 26.07m | Yunlen Solano (CRC) | 25.80m |
| Heptathlon | Abigail Obando (CRC) | 3179pts | Daniela Rojas (CRC) | 3019pts | Elisha Bernardez (BIZ) | 2776pts |
| 5000 metres Walk | Sonia Irene Barrondo (GUA) | 26:11.70 | Brenda Arely Mauricio (ESA) | 26:48.12 | Karin Vicente (GUA) | 26:59.58 |
| 4 x 100 metres relay | El Salvador; Katia Pozuelo; Beatriz Flamenco; Catherine Ramos; Ana Sarai Comandari | 50.76 | Panama; Leyka Archibold; Nathalee Aranda; Marina Mosquera; Andrea Rodríguez | 51.25 | Nicaragua; Emilia Palma; Meyling Hernández; Anielka Reyes; Hellen Toledo | 53.82 |
| 1000m Medley relay (100m x 200m x 300m x 400m) | Costa Rica; Abigail Obando; Gina Zambrana; Jacqueline Montoya; Naomi Smith | 2:22.77 | El Salvador; Ana Sarai Comandari; Beatriz Flamenco; Catherine Ramos; Katia Pozuelo | 2:23.68 | Guatemala; Ana Sofía Aguilar; Andrea Lemus; Cora María Gutiérrez; Lilian Rocío Orellana | 2:30.48 |

== Medal table (unofficial) ==
* Host nation (El Salvador)

| Rank | Nation | Gold | Silver | Bronze | Total |
|---|---|---|---|---|---|
| 1 | Costa Rica (CRC) | 23 | 28 | 14 | 65 |
| 2 | Panama (PAN) | 20 | 11 | 7 | 38 |
| 3 | El Salvador (ESA)* | 17 | 18 | 19 | 54 |
| 4 | Guatemala (GUA) | 16 | 17 | 23 | 56 |
| 5 | Nicaragua (NIC) | 4 | 4 | 6 | 14 |
| 6 | Belize (BIZ) | 2 | 1 | 6 | 9 |
| 7 | Honduras (HON) | 1 | 3 | 2 | 6 |
| Totals (7 entries) | | 83 | 82 | 77 | 242 |

== Team trophies ==
The placing table for team trophy awarded to the 1st place overall team (boys and girls categories) was published.

=== Overall ===
The host country is highlighted in lavender blue

| Rank | Nation | Points |
|---|---|---|
| 1st place, gold medalist(s) | Costa Rica | 237 |
| 2 | Guatemala | 222 |
| 3 | El Salvador | 170 |
| 4 | (Panama) Panamá | 167 |
| 5 | Belize | 43 |
| 6 | Nicaragua | 40 |
| 7 | Honduras | 23 |

== Participation ==
A total number of 301 athletes and officials were reported to participate in the event.

- Belize (42)
- Costa Rica (70)
- El Salvador (64)
- Guatemala (57)
- Honduras (15)
- Nicaragua (21)
- (Panama) Panamá (32)
