= 2010 Central American Junior and Youth Championships in Athletics =

XXIII Central American Junior and XVIII Central American Youth Championships in Athletics
- Dates: May 28–29
- Host city: Panama City, Panama
- Venue: Estadio Rommel Fernández
- Level: Junior and Youth
- Events: 82 (43 boys, 39 girls)
- Participation: 250 athletes from 7 nations
- Records set: 17

The 2010 Central American Junior and Youth Championships in Athletics were held at the Estadio Rommel Fernández in Panama City, Panama, on May 28–29, 2010. Organized by the Central American Isthmus Athletic Confederation (CADICA), it was the 23rd edition of the Junior (U-20) and the 18th edition of the Youth (U-18) competition. A total of 82 events were contested, 43 by boys and 39 by girls. Overall winner on points was Costa Rica.

== Medal summary ==
Complete results were published at different websites.

=== Junior ===
==== Boys (U-20) ====
Event	Gold		Silver		Bronze	
100 metres (wind: -0.2 m/s)	Josef Norales (HON)	10.88	Kemner Watson (CRC)	11.15	Chemaikel Ramírez (CRC)	11.31
200 metres (wind: -0.4 m/s)	Rober Trigueño (GUA)	21.82	Josef Norales (HON)	21.89	José Miguel Solórzano (GUA)	22.44
400 metres	Víctor Castro (ESA)	50.48	Iván Loo (PAN)	51.65	Carlos Barrera (PAN)	51.96
800 metres	Víctor Castro (ESA)	1:57.81	Alexis Corpas (PAN)	1:58.93	Allan Cordero (PAN)	1:59.19
1500 metres	Ernesto Saborío (CRC)	4:22.24	Daniel Meléndez (CRC)	4:22.68	José Alfredo Raxón (GUA)	4:22.93
5000 metres	José Alfredo Raxón (GUA)	16:01.39	Carlos Rivera (CRC)	16:46.50	Ezequiel White (PAN)	17:17.53
10000 metres	Carlos Rivera (CRC)	34:52.79	José Chong (PAN)	37:50.09		
3000 metres steeplechase	Juan Darío Icó (GUA)	9:59.56	Javier Hurtado (PAN)	10:30.49	Ezequiel White (PAN)	11:46.96
110 metres hurdles (wind: +0.4 m/s)	Keiner Shion (CRC)	15.08	Antonio Flamenco (ESA)	15.27	Tony Otero (NCA)	15.95
400 metres hurdles	Iván Loo (PAN)	54.98	Antonio Flamenco (ESA)	57.38	Juan Hidalgo (CRC)	57.39
High jump	Marlon Colorado (ESA)	2.10 m CR	Ernest Harris (CRC)	1.87 m	Yowi Ramos (PAN)	1.84 m
Pole vault	Pedro Figueroa (ESA)	4.00 m				
Long jump	Jason Castro (HON)	7.10 m (wind: -0.1 m/s)	Chemaikel Ramírez (CRC)	6.91 m (wind: -1.2 m/s)	Seylik Gamboa (GUA)	6.79 m (wind: +0.4 m/s)
Triple jump	Jason Castro (HON)	15.63 m (wind: +0.8 m/s) CR	Emilio Peña (NCA)	13.77 m (wind: +0.5 m/s)	Seylik Gamboa (GUA)	13.72 m (wind: +0.6 m/s)
Shot put	Joel Domínguez (PAN)	13.22 m	Luis Olivas (CRC)	13.00 m	Billy Manolo López (GUA)	11.97 m
Discus throw	Winston Campbell (HON)	48.80 m CR	Joel Domínguez (PAN)	44.73 m	Francisco Samayoa (GUA)	40.79 m
Hammer throw	Julio Rodolfo Aldana (GUA)	41.29 m	Alejandro Arroyo (CRC)	38.28 m	Rodolfo Torres (CRC)	35.97 m
Javelin throw	Freddy Villalobos (CRC)	53.64 m	Sebastián Martínez (PAN)	51.07 m	Erick Méndez (CRC)	47.90 m
Decathlon	Jorge Mena (PAN)	5342 pts	Rolando Ayala (ESA)	5210 pts	Isaí Ulate (CRC)	4311 pts
10,000 metres Walk	Erick Barrondo (GUA)	48:16.69	Mauricio Calvo (CRC)	48:20.94		
4 x 100 metres relay	Guatemala; José Solórzano; Julio Rivera; Rober Trigueño; Seylik Gamboa	43.27	Costa Rica; Jean Víquez; Kemner Watson; Raúl Saavedra; Wayne James	43.46	Panama; Iván Loo; Jean Pierre González; Josué Moreno; Carlos Barrera	43.97
4 x 400 metres relay	Panama; Alexis Corpas; Armando Solano; Carlos Barrera; Iván Loo	3:24.07	Guatemala; Carlos Tello; Rober Trigueño; Edwin Noriega; José Solórzano	3:25.50	Costa Rica; Donovan Hernández; Ernesto Saborío; Raúl Saavedra; Wayne James	3:28.00

==== Girls (U-20) ====
Event	Gold		Silver		Bronze	
100 metres (wind: +0.7 m/s)	Shantelly Scott (CRC)	12.78	Kimberly Morales (CRC)	12.94	Zelia Downer (PAN)	12.95
200 metres (wind: -0.1 m/s)	Shantelly Scott (CRC)	26.19	Iris Santamaría (ESA)	26.60	Kimberly Morales (CRC)	26.79
400 metres	Shantelly Scott (CRC)	59.48	Bessy Flores (ESA)	60.33	Reina Morales (CRC)	60.81
800 metres	Yolide Solís (CRC)	2:16.43	Brenda Salmerón (ESA)	2:21.25	Reina Morales (CRC)	2:26.03
1500 metres	Brenda Salmerón (ESA)	4:53.89	Silka Núñez (PAN)	4:55.72	Joseline Núñez (PAN)	5:10.57
3000 metres steeplechase	Conny Villalobos (NCA)	13:01.59				
100 metres hurdles (wind: +0.3 m/s)	Ana María Porras (CRC)	15.58	Claudia Villeda (GUA)	16.11	Iris Santamaría (ESA)	16.63
400 metres hurdles	Ana María Porras (CRC)	64.57	Bessy Flores (ESA)	65.62	Angela Ferris (PAN)	73.43
High jump	Kashani Ríos (PAN)	1.68 m	Yescarleth Rodríguez (NCA)	1.40 m		
Long jump	Ana Lucía Camargo (GUA)	5.51 m (wind: +0.2 m/s)	Kimberly Morales (CRC)	4.98 m (wind: +0.6 m/s)		
Triple jump	Ana Lucía Camargo (GUA)	11.91 m (wind: +0.2 m/s) CR				
Shot put	Stephanie Zúñiga (CRC)	10.48 m	Estela Sánchez (CRC)	9.70 m	Madeleine Ortega (PAN)	7.98 m
Discus throw	Génova Arias (CRC)	37.19 m	Madeleine Ortega (PAN)	32.15 m	Estela Sánchez (CRC)	27.90 m
Hammer throw	Kristin Castillo (CRC)	33.50 m	Estela Sánchez (CRC)	31.53 m	Julieta Ortega (PAN)	22.67 m
Javelin throw	Génova Arias (CRC)	41.96 m	Lorena Medina (ESA)	40.76 m	Natasha Rodríguez (CRC)	35.58 m
Heptathlon	Ruth Morales (GUA)	3929 pts	Andrea Melgar (ESA)	3506 pts	Lillian Koo (PAN)	2912 pts
10,000 metres Walk	Linda Paz (ESA)	54:29.57	Brendis Zeledón (NCA)	1:04:54.92		
4 x 100 metres relay	Costa Rica; Ana María Porras; Kimberly Morales; Shantelly Scott; Yolide Solís	49.72	Panama; Kashani Ríos; Leyla Kerr; Silka Núñez; Zelia Downer	51.47		
4 x 400 metres relay	Costa Rica; Ana María Porras; Reina Morales; Shantelly Scott; Yolide Solís	4:00.20				

=== Youth ===
==== Boys (U-18) ====
Event	Gold		Silver		Bronze	
100 metres (wind: +0.7 m/s)	Juan Mosquera (PAN)	11.35	Wilmer Morales (CRC)	11.42	Thomas Castro (CRC)	11.53
200 metres (wind: -0.3 m/s)	César Vásquez (CRC)	22.72	Wilmer Morales (CRC)	22.96	Cristian Brooks (PAN)	24.31
400 metres	César Vásquez (CRC)	50.16	Jairo Guerra (GUA)	51.48	Wilmer Morales (CRC)	51.63
800 metres	Josué Pérez (GUA)	1:58.60 CR	Alejandro Castillo (PAN)	1:59.71	Kevin Góchez (ESA)	2:00.37
1500 metres	Steven Valverde (CRC)	4'09.60	Kevin Góchez (ESA)	4'10.16	Edwin Pirir (GUA)	4'10.83
3000 metres	Kevin Góchez (ESA)	9:14.82	Steven Valverde (CRC)	9:14.85	Fredy Ruano (GUA)	9:15.14
2000 metres steeplechase	Fredy Ruano (GUA)	6:33.34	Joel Flores (GUA)	6:33.55	Alberto Guerra (PAN)	7:44.08
110 metres hurdles (wind: +1.2 m/s)	José Chorro (ESA)	14.58	Gerber Blanco (GUA)	15.01	Jefferson Matamoros (CRC)	15.34
400 metres hurdles	José Chorro (ESA)	53.65 CR	Gerber Blanco (GUA)	53.75	Gerald Drummond (CRC)	55.79
High jump	William Figueroa (CRC)	1.95 m CR	Kenneth Pineda (GUA)	1.86 m	Elías Mora (CRC)	1.86 m
Pole vault	Javier Romero (ESA)	3.40 m	Josué Berrocal (CRC)	2.90 m		
Long jump	Juan Mosquera (PAN)	6.92 m (wind: -1.9 m/s) CR	Jairo Guerra (GUA)	6.56 m (wind: -1.1 m/s)	Silvio Peña (NCA)	6.56 m (wind: +0.4 m/s)
Triple jump	Silvio Peña (NCA)	13.82 m (wind: +0.5 m/s)	Juan Mosquera (PAN)	13.70 m (wind: 0.0 m/s)	Ian Grenald (PAN)	12.64 m (wind: -0.5 m/s)
Shot put	Bryan Méndez (CRC)	14.65 m CR	Justin Awe (BIZ)	14.20 m	Alberto Peralta (PAN)	13.11 m
Discus throw	Bryan Méndez (CRC)	43.33 m CR	Alberto Peralta (PAN)	38.93 m	José Pablo Tarragó (GUA)	38.35 m
Hammer throw	Enrique Gaitán (GUA)	61.61 m	Bryan Méndez (CRC)	40.67 m	Joel González (PAN)	37.80 m
Javelin throw	Wilberth Orias (CRC)	51.11 m	Kevin Vásquez (CRC)	50.55 m	Pablo Cuadra (NCA)	50.49 m
Octathlon	Nils Pira (GUA)	4208 pts	Abel García (PAN)	3889 pts	Mariano Miranda (CRC)	3488 pts
10,000 metres Walk	Nelson Leonel Pérez (GUA)	49:38.39	César Escobar (ESA)	54:16.35	Iván Carranza (CRC)	1:00:15.33
4 x 100 metres relay	Costa Rica; César Vásquez; Heiner Castro; Thomas Castro; Wilmer Morales	43.91 CR	Guatemala; Gerber Blanco; Jairo Guerra; Kenneth Pineda; Nils Pirra	44.34	Panama; Allen Flores; Cristian Brooks; Juan Mosquera; Nathanael Guizado	45.08
1000m Medley relay (100m x 200m x 300m x 400m)	Costa Rica; César Vásquez; Gerald Drummond; Thomas Castro; Wilmer Morales	1:59.12 CR	Guatemala; Gerber Blanco; Jairo Guerra; Kenneth Pineda; Josué Pérez	2:00.55	El Salvador; Javier Romero; José Chorro; Juan Rivas; Kevin Góchez	2:02.12

==== Girls (U-18) ====
Event	Gold		Silver		Bronze	
100 metres (wind: +0.3 m/s)	Glenda Davis (CRC)	12.66	Melda Ramírez (GUA)	12.82	Beatriz Flamenco (ESA)	12.98
200 metres (wind: -0.5 m/s)	Glenda Davis (CRC)	25.71	Katia Pozuelo (ESA)	26.21	Ingrid Narváez (NCA)	26.42
400 metres	Kathi Cuadra (NCA)	56.78 CR	Ingrid Narváez (NCA)	58.84	Gabriela Guevara (PAN)	60.69
800 metres	Kathi Cuadra (NCA)	2:22.31	Fiorella Vega (CRC)	2:27.04	Diana Sofía Gutiérrez (GUA)	2:35.08
1500 metres	Jacqueline Montoya (CRC)	4:58.79	María Viera (PAN)	4:59.91	Maritza Poncio (GUA)	5:01.80
3000 metres	María Viera (PAN)	11:22.14	Meyling Hernández (NCA)	11:33.05	Lisseth Noguera (NCA)	11:33.46
100 metres hurdles (wind: +0.7 m/s)	Rebeca Duarte (ESA)	15.12	Katia Pozuelo (ESA)	15.41	María Menéndez (GUA)	15.47
400 metres hurdles	Gabriela Guevara (PAN)	65.60	María Menéndez (GUA)	65.84	Rocío Zamora (CRC)	66.35
High jump	Jessica López (ESA)	1.51 m	Lorena Camero (PAN)	1.48 m	Alejandra Moreira (ESA)	1.45 m
Pole vault	Emily Monzón (GUA)	2.70 m CR				
Long jump	Rebeca Duarte (ESA)	5.52 m (wind: +0.9 m/s) CR	Jessica Sánchez (CRC)	5.43 m (wind: +1.3 m/s)	Nathalee Aranda (PAN)	5.43 m (wind: +0.6 m/s)
Triple jump	Rebeca Duarte (ESA)	11.50 m (wind: -0.4 m/s)	Jessica Sánchez (CRC)	11.18 m (wind: +0.3 m/s)	Cristina Aldana (GUA)	10.66 m (wind: 0.0 m/s)
Shot put	Gisela Henríquez (PAN)	11.36 m	Haydee Grijalba (CRC)	10.77 m	Paola González (PAN)	9.73 m
Discus throw	Gisela Henríquez (PAN)	34.50 m	Sandra Mosquera (PAN)	32.21 m	Haydee Grijalba (CRC)	30.21 m
Hammer throw	Ana Harry (HON)	37.80 m	Dagmar Alvarado (PAN)	30.99 m		
Javelin throw	Haydee Grijalba (CRC)	35.52 m	Carmen Yanira López (GUA)	34.68 m	Ana Ortiz (PAN)	34.66 m
Heptathlon	Jessica López (ESA)	3639 pts CR	Lisandra Norales (GUA)	3077 pts	Rosa Angélica Barrera (GUA)	3005 pts
5000 metres Walk	Gissell Rodríguez (PAN)	28:45.31	Yesenia Ivania Miranda (ESA)	28:56.36	Rosalina Álvarez (NCA)	33:09.77
4 x 100 metres relay	Costa Rica; Glenda Davis; Jessica Sánchez; Kelly Alfaro; Rocío Zamora	50.02	Panama; Keysi Degracia; Nathalee Aranda; Whitney Marks; Yachira Ortega	50.39	El Salvador; Alejandra Moreira; Beatriz Flamenco; Katia Pozuelo; Rebeca Duarte	51.07
1000m Medley relay (100m x 200m x 300m x 400m)	Nicaragua; Eugenia Stargarten; Ingrid Narváez; Kathi Cuadra; Vanessa Romero	2:15.99 CR	Costa Rica; Glenda Davis; Jessica Sánchez; Kelly Alfaro; Rocío Zamora	2:18.93	Panama; Gabriela Guevara; Keysi Degracia; Nathalee Aranda; Yachira Ortega	2:19.64

== Medal table (unofficial) ==
An unofficial medal count is shown below. This medal table differs from published medal tables. This could be explained by the fact that a couple of events might have been treated as exhibition because of the low number of participants.

* Host nation (Panama)

Rank	Nation	Gold	Silver	Bronze	Total
1	Costa Rica (CRC)	30	24	20	74
2	Guatemala (GUA)	15	14	14	43
3	El Salvador (ESA)	15	14	6	35
4	Panama (PAN)*	12	18	23	53
5	Nicaragua (NIC)	5	5	6	16
6	Honduras (HON)	5	1	0	6
7	Belize (BIZ)	0	1	0	1
Totals (7 entries)		82	77	69	228

== Team trophies ==
The placing table for team trophy awarded to the 1st place overall team (boys and girls categories) was published.

=== Overall ===
The host country is highlighted in lavender blue

Rank	Nation	Points
1st place, gold medalist(s)	Costa Rica	327
2	Panama	233
3	Guatemala	190
4	El Salvador	157
5	Nicaragua	72
6	Honduras	24
7	Belize	4

== Participation ==
A total number of 250 athletes were reported to participate in the event.

- Belize (5)
- Costa Rica (68)
- El Salvador (25)
- Guatemala (49)
- Honduras (4)
- Nicaragua (19)
- Panama (80)
