= 2011 Central American Junior and Youth Championships in Athletics =

XXIV Central American Junior and XIX Central American Youth Championships in Athletics
- Dates: June 18–19
- Host city: San Salvador, El Salvador
- Venue: Estadio Nacional Flor Blanca "Magico Gonzalez"
- Level: Junior and Youth
- Events: 80 (42 men, 38 women)
- Participation: 245 athletes from 7 nations

The 2011 Central American Junior and Youth Championships in Athletics were held at the Estadio Nacional Flor Blanca "Magico Gonzalez" in San Salvador, El Salvador, between June 18–19, 2011. Organized by the Central American Isthmus Athletic Confederation (CADICA), it was the 24th edition of the Junior (U-20) and the 19th edition of the Youth (U-18) competition. A total of 80 events were contested, 42 by boys and 38 by girls. Overall winner on points was Costa Rica.

== Medal summary ==
Complete results can be found on the CADICA webpage.

=== Junior ===
==== Boys (U-20) ====
Event	Gold		Silver		Bronze	
100 metres (wind: -0.8 m/s)	Mateo Edward (PAN)	10.62	Helson Pitillo (HON)	10.68	Rober Trigueño (GUA)	10.70
200 metres (wind: -1.5 m/s)	Mateo Edward (PAN)	21.64	Helson Pitillo (HON)	21.65	Rober Trigueño (GUA)	21.95
400 metres	Mario Guerrero (NCA)	49.88	Luis Murillo (CRC)	49.89	Oscar Cuéllar (ESA)	50.37
800 metres	Novian Middleton (BIZ)	1:55.89	Mario Guerrero (NCA)	1:56.68	Allan Cordero (CRC)	1:58.00
1500 metres	Steven Valverde (CRC)	4:07.94	Carlos René Aguilar (ESA)	4:08.68	Allan Cordero (CRC)	4:13.06
5000 metres	Carlos René Aguilar (ESA)	15:40.83	Fredy Orlando Ruano (GUA)	16:01.20	Carlos Rivera (CRC)	16:02.88
10000 metres	Carlos Rivera (CRC)	33:21.65	Fredy Orlando Ruano (GUA)	33:25.49	Kenneth Robles (CRC)	35:14.14
3000 metres steeplechase	Joel Flores (GUA)	10:02.48	Leiser Emanuel Valenzuela (GUA)	10:26.94		
110 metres hurdles (wind: -0.9 m/s)	José Adalberto Chorro (ESA)	15.19	Jefferson Matamoros (CRC)	15.22	William Ríos (PAN)	15.43
400 metres hurdles	Gerber Blanco (GUA)	55.82	Jefferson Matamoros (CRC)	57.15	Francisco Urquilla (ESA)	57.27
High jump	Marlon Eduardo Colorado (ESA)	1.93m	Elías Mora (CRC)	1.90m	Adrián René Flores (HON)	1.90m
Pole vault	Javier Antonio Romero (ESA)	4.10m				
Long jump	Seylik Emeterio Gamboa (GUA)	6.83m	Chemaikel Ramírez (CRC)	6.78m	Jairo Gonzalo Guerra (GUA)	6.51m
Triple jump	Seylik Emeterio Gamboa (GUA)	13.69m (wind: 1.8 m/s)	Kenneth Brackett (BIZ)	13.63m (wind: 3.4 m/s)		
Shot put	Bryan Méndez (CRC)	16.58m CR	Alberto Peralta (PAN)	15.33m	Denys Andres Durán (ESA)	15.01m
Discus throw	Bryan Méndez (CRC)	44.23	Billy Gamboa (GUA)	40.10	Billy Manolo López (GUA)	39.91
Hammer throw	Alejandro Arroyo (CRC)	43.07m	Bryan Méndez (CRC)	42.82m	Miguel Celma (ESA)	42.05m
Javelin throw	Moisés Enrique Lara (NCA)	51.69m	Nils Johan Pira (GUA)	47.19m	Joel González (PAN)	44.64m
Decathlon	Jorge Mena (PAN)	5531pts	Vladimir Ruiz (CRC)	4685pts	Miguel Martínez (HON)	4604pts
4 x 100 metres relay	Costa Rica; Chemaikel Ramírez; Yanicio Cole; Luis Murillo; Kemner Watson	43.41	Guatemala; Jairo Gonzalo Guerra; Seylik Emeterio Gamboa; Rober Trigueño; Nils Johan Pira	43.81	Belize; Kennett Brackett; Aaren Roches; Brandon Flores; Jorge Jimenez	44.44
4 x 400 metres relay	Costa Rica; Jefferson Matamoros; Heiner Castro; Keiner Shion; Yanicio Cole; Luis Murillo; Allan Cordero	3:22.43	Guatemala; Rober Trigueño; Gerber Blanco; Edson Josué Monzón; Jairo Gonzalo Guerra	3:23.81		

==== Girls (U-20) ====
Event	Gold		Silver		Bronze	
100 metres (wind: -0.2 m/s)	Tatiana Zamora (CRC)	12.90	Diana Garita (CRC)	13.09	Charnelle Enriquez (BIZ)	13.25
200 metres (wind: -1.7 m/s)	Diana Garita (CRC)	26.44	Tatiana Zamora (CRC)	26.50	Charnelle Enriquez (BIZ)	27.25
400 metres	Jessica Sánchez (CRC)	60.44	María Fernanda Torres (CRC)	61.96	Jocelyn Marisela Ramírez (ESA)	63.55
800 metres	Jocelyn Marisela Ramírez (ESA)	2:24.16	María Fernanda Torres (CRC)	2:29.12	Carmen Araceli Puac (GUA)	2:31.26
1500 metres	Carmen Araceli Puac (GUA)	5:13.53				
3000 metres	Carmen Araceli Puac (GUA)	11:07.01				
100 metres hurdles (wind: -1.1 m/s)	Rocío Zamora (CRC)	16.36	Iris Alexandra Santamaría (ESA)	17.08	Paola Solórzano (CRC)	17.15
400 metres hurdles	Rocío Zamora (CRC)	66.49				
High jump	Ligia Patricia Paniagua (CRC)	1.51m				
Long jump	Thelma Noemí Fuentes (GUA)	5.57m (wind: 1.0 m/s)	Cristina Anelise Aldana (GUA)	5.52m (wind: 0.8 m/s)	Jessica Sánchez (CRC)	5.31m (wind: 2.9 m/s)
Triple jump	Thelma Noemí Fuentes (GUA)	11.97m (wind: 2.7 m/s)	Cristina Anelise Aldana (GUA)	11.34m (wind: 1.8 m/s)	Jessica Sánchez (CRC)	11.20m (wind: 1.6 m/s)
Shot put	Emma Paulina Castillo (GUA)	10.11m	Mercedes Silva (CRC)	10.01m	Sandra Mosquera (PAN)	9.90m
Discus throw	Sandra Mosquera (PAN)	35.44m	Emma Paulina Castillo (GUA)	29.37m	Mercedes Silva (CRC)	25.95m
Hammer throw	Ana Harry (HON)	38.39m				
Javelin throw	Lorena Claribel Medina (ESA)	36.41m	Sofía Isabel Alonso (GUA)	36.09m	Natasha Rodríguez (CRC)	36.04m
Heptathlon	Ruth Amalia Morales (GUA)	4245pts	Melissa Gutiérrez (CRC)	3401pts	Paola Solórzano (CRC)	3092pts
4 x 100 metres relay	Costa Rica; Diana Garita; Tatiana Zamora; Jessica Sánchez; Rocío Zamora	51.16	Guatemala; Thelma Noemí Fuentes; Cristina Anelise Aldana; Carmen Araceli Puac; Ruth Amalia Morales	55.10	El Salvador; María de los Ángeles Romualdo; Lorena Claribel Medina; Jocelyn Marisela Ramírez; Iris Alexandra Santamaría	56.47
4 x 400 metres relay	Costa Rica; Jessica Sánchez; Rocío Zamora; María Fernanda Torres; Diana Garita	4:10.72	El Salvador; Lorena Claribel Medina; Iris Alexandra Santamaría; María de los Ángeles Romualdo; Jocelyn Marisela Ramírez	4:43.70		

=== Youth ===
==== Boys (U-18) ====
Event	Gold		Silver		Bronze	
100 metres (wind: -1.0 m/s)	Erick Meza (CRC)	11.45	Erick José Salazar (GUA)	11.48	Cristian Brooks (PAN)	11.54
200 metres (wind: -2.1 m/s)	Donald Arias (CRC)	22.97	Cristian Brooks (PAN)	23.02	Erick José Salazar (GUA)	23.23
400 metres	Donald Arias (CRC)	50.37	Manuel Alfredo Rivas (GUA)	51.98	Ernesto Giralt (ESA)	53.70
800 metres	Víctor Emilio Ortíz (CRC)	1:54.98 CR	Manuel Alfredo Rivas (GUA)	1:59.88	Rondre Lewis (BIZ)	2:01.97
1500 metres	Víctor Emilio Ortíz (CRC)	4:02.39 CR	Edwin Pirir (GUA)	4:02.53	Walter Yac (GUA)	4:14.65
3000 metres	Edwin Pirir (GUA)	8:51.23	Walter Yac (GUA)	8:54.37	Luis Gustavo Solórzano (ESA)	9:15.55
2000 metres steeplechase	Néstor Mijangos (GUA)	6:38.0	Immer Leyton (NCA)	6:51.0		
110 metres hurdles (wind: -0.8 m/s)	René Perla (ESA)	15.56	Nabdiel Chiari (PAN)	16.00	Mariano Miranda (CRC)	16.17
400 metres hurdles	Mariano Miranda (CRC)	56.73	César Alonso Chávez (ESA)	59.74	Gerardo Saúl Hernández (ESA)	60.91
High jump	Ronald Edyberto Ramírez (GUA)	1.90m	Bryan Zelaya (ESA)	1.74m	Jaymar Hardy (CRC)	1.71m
Pole vault	César Alonso Chávez (ESA)	3.60m	Alejandro Rafael Melara (ESA)	3.40m	Josué Berrocal (CRC)	3.20m
Long jump	Juan Mosquera (PAN)	7.02m CR	Kevin Josué Zelaya (ESA)	6.51m	Pablo Alejandro Taracena (GUA)	6.33m
Triple jump	Juan Mosquera (PAN)	14.81m (wind: 1.8 m/s)	Franklin Aranda (BIZ)	12.90m (wind: 2.1 m/s)	Kevin Josué Zelaya (ESA)	12.67m (wind: 1.6 m/s)
Shot put	Ever Acajabón (GUA)	14.51m	Ronald Alexander Alvarenga (ESA)	13.93m	José Omar Mora (NCA)	13.28m
Discus throw	Ever Acajabón (GUA)	40.50m	Magno Enrique Escobar (GUA)	38.76m	José Omar Mora (NCA)	36.20m
Hammer throw	Otto Steve Vivas (GUA)	42.79m	César Villarreal (CRC)	33.72m	Luis Diego Villarreal (CRC)	33.34m
Javelin throw	Pablo Cuadra (NCA)	53.23	Raylinds Delgado (NCA)	51.91	Ronny Madrid (PAN)	49.47
Octathlon	Ramón Marcia (HON)	4638pts	Kevin Josué Zelaya (ESA)	4619pts	Marcio Cruz (NCA)	4506pts
10,000 metres Walk	César Cristian Escobar (ESA)	49:29.7	David Alexander Escobar (ESA)	53:39.4	Leandro Antonio Lemus (GUA)	58:08.5
4 x 100 metres relay	Costa Rica; Jaymar Hardy; Aníbal Salguero; Donald Arias; Erick Meza	44.97	Guatemala; Pablo Alejandro Taracena; Erick José Salazar; Carlos Alberto Paz; Ronald Edyberto Ramírez	45.59	El Salvador; Manuel Antonio Portillo; Ernesto Giralt; Santiago Escalón; Bryan Zelaya	46.22
1000m Medley relay (100m x 200m x 300m x 400m)	Costa Rica; Mariano Miranda; Donald Arias; Erick Meza; Víctor Emilio Ortíz	2:00.39	Guatemala; Manuel Alfredo Rivas; Pablo Alejandro Taracena; Erick José Salazar; Carlos Alberto Paz	2:03.35	Panama; Nabdiel Chiari; Juan Mosquera; Cristian Brooks; Javier Chong	2:06.28

==== Girls (U-18) ====
Event	Gold		Silver		Bronze	
100 metres (wind: -2.5 m/s)	Katia Pozuelo (ESA)	12.53	Glenda Davis (CRC)	12.77	Nathalee Aranda (PAN)	12.97
200 metres (wind: -1.9 m/s)	Glenda Davis (CRC)	25.54	Katia Pozuelo (ESA)	25.95	Beatriz Flamenco (ESA)	26.41
400 metres	Glenda Davis (CRC)	58.05	Ingrid Narváez (NCA)	58.38	Gabriela Guevara (PAN)	61.60
800 metres	Jacqueline Montoya (CRC)	2:21.11	Fiorella Vega (CRC)	2:24.38	Karla Carrero (ESA)	2:27.42
1500 metres	Meyling Hernández (NCA)	5:04.81	Maritza Rafaela Poncio (GUA)	5:05.48	María Viera (PAN)	5:13.89
3000 metres	Maritza Rafaela Poncio (GUA)	11:03.58	Meyling Hernández (NCA)	11:21.69	María Viera (PAN)	11:25.93
100 metres hurdles (wind: 0.3 m/s)	Katia Pozuelo (ESA)	14.9	Naomi Smith (CRC)	15.2	María Reneé Gómez (ESA)	15.5
400 metres hurdles	Gabriela Guevara (PAN)	65.84	Andrea Vargas (CRC)	66.78	Sofía Pastore (ESA)	72.31
High jump	Jessica Margarita López (ESA)	1.48m	Jennifer Marielos Mérida (GUA); Lorena Camero (PAN)	1.45m		1.45m
Pole vault	Catherine Ramos (ESA)	2.40m				
Long jump	Nathalee Aranda (PAN)	5.72m (wind: 0.2 m/s) CR	María Reneé Gómez (ESA)	5.27m (wind: 2.9 m/s)	Carmen Leticia Paniagua (GUA)	5.14m (wind: 0.1 m/s)
Triple jump	María Reneé Gómez (ESA)	11.70m (wind: 2.4 m/s)	Sofía Paulina Pastore (ESA)	10.30m (wind: 0.8 m/s)	Katheryn María Cantoral (GUA)	9.52m (wind: 2.2 m/s)
Shot put	Gisela Henriquez (PAN)	11.27m	Gloria Serano (BIZ)	10.59m	Naomi Smith (CRC)	9.41m
Discus throw	Gloria Serano (BIZ)	29.80m	Herlinda Elizabeth Portillo (GUA)	29.73m	Katherine Jamileth Arzú (GUA)	27.62m
Hammer throw	Gabriela Mundo (ESA)	36.69m	Katia Michelle García (ESA)	31.97m	Dagmar Alvarado (PAN)	31.44m
Javelin throw	Lourdes Guadalupe Medina (ESA)	33.77m	Gorlee Marin (BIZ)	26.20m	Gloria Serano (BIZ)	26.06m
Heptathlon	Jessica Margarita López (ESA)	3712 pts CR	Paola Vanessa Ayala (ESA)	3166 pts		
5000 metres Walk	Yesenia Ivania Miranda (ESA)	27:22.7	Kenia Marisol Rodríguez (ESA)	29:33.9	Rosalina Álvarez (NCA)	31:08.5
4 x 100 metres relay	El Salvador; Katia Pozuelo; Beatriz Flamenco; María Reneé Gómez; Gabriela Guadalupe Castillo	49.85	Costa Rica; Glenda Davis; Jacqueline Montoya; Naomi Smith; Andrea Vargas	51.71	Guatemala; Lilian Rocío Orellana; Eloisa Paulina Chaj; Carmen Leticia Paniagua; Jennifer Marielos Mérida	51.89
1000m Medley relay (100m x 200m x 300m x 400m)	Costa Rica; Naomi Smith; Andrea Vargas; Glenda Davis; Jacqueline Montoya	2:21.28	El Salvador; Katia Pozuelo; María Reneé Gómez; Beatriz Flamenco; Paola Vanessa Ayala	2:23.19	Panama; Lorena Camero; Gabriela Guevara; María Viera; Nathalee Aranda	2:28.48

== Medal table (unofficial) ==
* Host nation (El Salvador)

Rank	Nation	Gold	Silver	Bronze	Total
1	Costa Rica	27	19	15	61
2	El Salvador*	19	17	15	51
3	Guatemala	17	23	13	53
4	Panama	9	4	12	25
5	Nicaragua	4	5	4	13
6	Belize	2	4	5	11
7	Honduras	2	2	2	6
Totals (7 entries)		80	74	66	220

== Team trophies ==
The placing table for team trophy awarded to the 1st place overall team (boys and girls categories) was published.

=== Overall ===
The host country is highlighted in lavender blue

Rank	Nation	Points
1st place, gold medalist(s)	Costa Rica	237
2	El Salvador	216
3	Guatemala	199.5
4	(Panama) Panamá	113.5
5	Belize	63
6	Nicaragua	57
7	Honduras	24

== Participation ==
A total number of 245 athletes and 51 officials were reported to participate in the event.

- Belize (38)
- Costa Rica (44)
- El Salvador (55)
- Guatemala (49)
- Honduras (18)
- Nicaragua (16)
- (Panama) Panamá (25)
