= 2008 Central American Junior and Youth Championships in Athletics =

XXI Central American Junior and XVI Central American Youth Championships in Athletics
- Dates: July 19–20
- Host city: San Salvador, El Salvador
- Venue: Estadio Nacional Flor Blanca "Magico Gonzalez"
- Level: Junior and Youth
- Events: 77 (41 boys, 36 girls)
- Participation: 372 athletes from 7 nations
- Records set: 22

The 2008 Central American Junior and Youth Championships in Athletics were held at the Estadio Nacional Flor Blanca "Magico Gonzalez" in San Salvador, El Salvador, between July 19–20, 2008. Organized by the Central American Isthmus Athletic Confederation (CADICA), it was the 21st edition of the Junior (U-20) and the 16th edition of the Youth (U-18) competition. A total of 77 events were contested, 41 by boys and 36 by girls. Overall winner on points was El Salvador.

== Medal summary ==
Complete results can be found on the CADICA and on the official website.

=== Junior ===
==== Boys (U-20) ====
Event	Gold		Silver		Bronze	
100 metres (wind: -1.2 m/s)	Renán Palma (ESA)	11.06	Alberto Perryman (PAN)	11.19	Eduardo Castillo (GUA)	11.36
200 metres (wind: -0.9 m/s)	Pedro Suazo (HON)	22.12	José González (CRC)	22.13	Renán Palma (ESA)	22.26
400 metres	José González (CRC)	48.63	Arnoldo Monge (CRC)	49.49	Pedro Suazo (HON)	49.53
800 metres	Edgar Cortez (NCA)	1:56.13	Wilson Solano (CRC)	1:56.49	Esdras Ixcakic (GUA)	1:56.57
1500 metres	Erick Rodríguez (NCA)	4:05.26	Esdras Ixcakic (GUA)	4:06.72	Alejandro Calderón (CRC)	4:08.55
5000 metres	Fermín Pérez (GUA)	16:04.36	Ángel Alfaro (NCA)	16:10.33	Alejandro Calderón (CRC)	16:19.69
10000 metres	Fermín Pérez (GUA)	34:13.04	Carlos Antonio Pérez (ESA)	34:31.38	Nelson Sevilla (NCA)	34:35.20
3000 metres steeplechase	Erick Rodríguez (NCA)	9:39.75	Douglas Aguilar (ESA)	9:40.82	Nelson Sevilla (NCA)	9:51.48
110 metres hurdles (wind: 1.6 m/s)	Renán Palma (ESA)	14.06 CR	Pedro Suazo (HON)	14.71	Esteban Quirós (CRC)	15.64
400 metres hurdles	José Eduardo González (ESA)	55.02	Stiven Navarrete (GUA)	55.53	Arturo Girón (GUA)	57.43
High jump	Alvin Tillett (BIZ)	1.80	Edward Chavarría (CRC)	1.75	Pablo Chaves (CRC)	1.70
Long jump	Alberto Perryman (PAN)	6.49	Kevin Varela (CRC)	6.40	Marlon Colocho (GUA)	6.38
Triple jump	Alberto Perryman (PAN)	14.01	Esteban Quiros (CRC)	13.29	Kevin Calderón (GUA)	12.97
Shot put	Luis Folgar (GUA)	14.93 CR	Jairo Alvarado Rodríguez (CRC)	13.00	Andrés Chacón (CRC)	12.16
Discus throw	Kairo Martínez (NCA)	45.81 CR	Luis Folgar (GUA)	41.87	Cristian Gilberto Jovel (ESA)	38.22
Hammer throw	Kairo Martínez (NCA)	56.22 CR	Jairo Alvarado Rodríguez (CRC)	46.07	Jason Masis Rivera (CRC)	45.10
Javelin throw	Benigno Ortega (PAN)	55.78	Edin Trigueros (GUA)	50.70	Luis Taracena (GUA)	50.48
Decathlon	Rafael Carmona (NCA)	4331	Laurence Hunter (NCA)	3895	Mario Mesa (CRC)	3833
10,000 metres Walk	Emerson Esnal Hernández (ESA)	43:38.08 CR	Mario Bran (GUA)	43:39.80	José Daniel Ledezma (CRC)	52:17.30
4 x 100 metres relay	El Salvador; Renán Palma; Carlos Zelaya; Juan Cuéllar; José Eduardo González	42.98	Costa Rica; Andrés Bermúdez; José González; André Carmona; Daniel Herrera	44.87		
4 x 400 metres relay	Guatemala; Rubén Frost; Eduardo Baldemar Castillo; Stiven Navarrete; Arturo Girón	3:24.95	El Salvador; Renán Palma; Juan Francisco Cuellar; José Eduardo González; Elmer Alexander Ramírez	3:26.05	Costa Rica; Deiver Ruby; Daniel Herrera; Arnoldo Monge; André Carmona	3:26.50

==== Girls (U-20) ====
Event	Gold		Silver		Bronze	
100 metres (wind: -0.6 m/s)	Mardel Alvarado (PAN)	12.58	Jessica Lino (HON)	12.65	Fátima Castro (ESA)	12.69
200 metres (wind: +0.3 m/s)	Mardel Alvarado (PAN)	25.64 CR	Stephanie Zamora (CRC)	25.65	Fátima Castro (ESA)	26.02
400 metres	Stephanie Zamora (CRC)	58,08 CR	Josselyn Escobar (ESA)	59,29	Carmen Quintana (PAN)	59,30
800 metres	Gladys Landaverde (ESA)	2:14.91 CR	Josselyn Escobar (ESA)	2:16.79	Caterin Ibarra (GUA)	2:21.81
1500 metres	Gladys Landaverde (ESA)	4:50.94	Reginalda Mijangos (GUA)	4:54.89	Eva María Rodríguez (ESA)	4:56.54
3000 metres	Blanca Solís (ESA)	10:27.97 CR	Reginalda Mijangos (GUA)	10:33.07	Gladys Landaverde (ESA)	10:43.44
5000 metres	Ingrid Solís (GUA)	19:00.48	Eva María Rodríguez (ESA)	19:05.68	Blanca Solís (ESA)	19:18.35
3000 metres steeplechase	Blanca Solís (ESA)	11:51.59 CR	Adilia Peralta (NCA)	13:04.15	Blanca Escobar (ESA)	14:44.62
100 metres hurdles	Pamela Jiménez (CRC)	15.77	Rosa Allen (GUA)	16.10	Gabriela Monge (CRC)	16.50
Long jump	Estefany Cruz (GUA)	5.80 CR	Leony Diñe (PAN)	5.22	Shiffana Flowers (BIZ)	5.19
Shot put	Rocío Navarro (PAN)	10.36	Jennifer Henríquez (ESA)	9.50	Karoline Morera (CRC)	9.29
Discus throw	Annagna Pardo (PAN)	28.30	Elecia Rodriguez (BIZ)	27.35	Karoline Morera (CRC)	26.76
Javelin throw	Rocío Navarro (PAN)	43.45	Ariana Fernández (CRC)	35.24	Andrea Fernández (CRC)	26.95
Heptathlon	Marcela Blandón (ESA)	2996	Jennifer Henríquez (ESA)	2887	Roxana Morán (GUA)	2611
10,000 metres Walk	Natalia Barton (ESA)	57:16.9	Brenda Ovando (GUA)	1:02:46.6	Jessica Ortiz (CRC)	1:02:46.9
4 x 100 metres relay	Panama; Carmen Quintanilla; Leony Diñe; Mardel Alvarado; Yelena Alvear	49.44	El Salvador; Fátima Castro; Josselyn Escobar; Gladys Landaverde; Marcela Blandón	51.01	Costa Rica; Stephanie Zamora; Sasha Sanabria; Pamela Jiménez; Gabriela Monge	52.20
4 x 400 metres relay	Panama; Carmen Quintanilla; Leony Diñe; Mardel Alvarado; Yelena Alvear	4:01.94 CR	El Salvador; Fátima Castro; Josselyn Escobar; Gladys Landaverde; Eva María Rodríguez	4:01.95	Costa Rica; Ethel Guevara; Stephanie Zamora; Pamela Jiménez; Lisseth Silva	4:09.63

=== Youth ===
==== Boys (U-18) ====
Event	Gold		Silver		Bronze	
100 metres (wind: 0.4 m/s)	Mateo Edward (PAN)	11.09	Joseph Norales (HON)	11.15	Isaías Palencia (ESA)	11.29
200 metres (wind: -1.5 m/s)	Mateo Edward (PAN)	22,68	Benjamín Rodríguez (GUA)	22,95	Isaías Palencia (ESA)	23,02
400 metres	Iván Loo (PAN)	51.49	Milton Flores (HON)	51.57	Robert Cayetano (GUA)	51.67
800 metres	Mario Guerrero (NCA)	1:58.95 CR	Daniel Meléndez (CRC)	1:59.90	Roger Matarrita (CRC)	2:00.58
1500 metres	Daniel Meléndez (CRC)	4:07.90 CR	Carlos René Aguilar (ESA)	4:10.59	Roger Matarrita (CRC)	4:11.76
3000 metres	Carlos René Aguilar (ESA)	9:08.87	José Alfredo Raxón (GUA)	9:12.34	Mynor Ajú (GUA)	9:16.60
2000 metres steeplechase	Carlos René Aguilar (ESA)	6:25.49	Juan Carranza (GUA)	6:33.74	Joel Hernández (NCA)	6:36.54
110 metres hurdles	Tony Otero (NCA)	15.40	Edwin Noriega (GUA)	15.49	Dionisio Rosales (PAN)	15.51
400 metres hurdles	Iván Loo (PAN)	56.15	Dionisio Rosales (PAN)	58.03	Keiner Shion (CRC)	59.32
High jump	Jason Castro (HON)	1.83	Alen Calderón (NCA)	1.80	Marlon Colorado (ESA)	1.77
Long jump	Jason Castro (HON)	6.74 CR	Josué Moreno (PAN)	6.74 CR	Alexandre Carmona (CRC)	6.70
Triple jump	Jason Castro (HON)	14.93 CR	Alexandre Carmona (CRC)	13.48	Kevin Córdova (GUA)	12.93
Shot put	Luis Olivas (CRC)	13.44	Arlen Pou (BIZ)	12.41	Joel Domínguez (PAN)	12.31
Discus throw	Joel Domínguez (PAN)	46.71	Carlos Vladimir Alas (ESA)	37.19	Carlos Alejandro Escobar (ESA)	35.79
Hammer throw	Enrique Gaitán (GUA)	45.48	Julio Aldana (GUA)	39.16	Carlos Vladimir Alas (ESA)	37.75
Javelin throw	Erick Méndez (CRC)	51.67	Mario Membreño (HON)	46.63	Luis Olivas (CRC)	45.89
Octathlon	Giancarlo Víquez (CRC)	4157	Fernando Miranda (PAN)	3994	Nils Pira (GUA)	3941
10,000 metres Walk	Juan Carlos Hernández (GUA)	48.14.2 CR	César Martínez (ESA)	52.57.1	Nestor Mejía (NCA)	53.08.0
4 x 100 metres relay	El Salvador; Carlos Javier Cruz; Gerardo Gutiérrez; Isaías Palencia; José Chorro	43.97	Panama; Fernando Miranda; Iván Loo; Josué Moreno; Jowi Ramos	44.26	Honduras; José Cordón; Joseph Norales; Jason Castro; Milton Flores	44.78
1000m Medley relay (100m x 200m x 300m x 400m)	Guatemala; José Miguel Solórzano; Benjamín Rodríguez; Robert Cayetano; Francisco Castellanos	2:02.04	Nicaragua; Tony Otero; Reynaldo Díaz; Mario Guerrero; José Benjamín Veliz	2:02.97	Panama; Fernando Miranda; Mateo Edward; Iván Loo; Josué Moreno	2:03.19

==== Girls (U-18) ====
Event	Gold		Silver		Bronze	
100 metres (wind: 1.1 m/s)	Shantelly Scott (CRC)	12.41 =CR	Lissette Mejía (ESA)	12.49	Kimberly Morales (CRC)	12.82
200 metres (wind: -1.0 m/s)	Shantelly Scott (CRC)	25,50	Lissette Mejía (ESA)	25,77	Iris Santamaría (ESA)	26,35
400 metres	Yolide Solís (CRC)	59.11	Bessy Flores (ESA)	60.49	Iris Santamaría (ESA)	60.52
800 metres	Brenda Salmerón (ESA)	2:14.51	Diana Gutiérrez (GUA)	2:16.79	Cony Villalobos (NCA)	2:21.81
1500 metres	Brenda Salmerón (ESA)	4:46.21	Diana Gutiérrez (GUA)	4:57.85	Cony Villalobos (NCA)	5:00.17
3000 metres	Brenda Salmerón (ESA)	10.17.27	Diana Gutiérrez (GUA)	10.53.75	Rosa Cartagena (ESA)	11.11.91
100 metres hurdles	Ana María Porras (CRC)	14.57	Claudia Villeda (GUA)	14.89	Alejandra Menéndez (GUA)	15.70
400 metres hurdles	Ana María Porras (CRC)	64.74 CR	Bessy Flores (ESA)	65.71	Iris Santamaría (ESA)	67.12
High jump	Kashany Ríos (PAN)	1.67 CR	Stephanie Sánchez (NCA)	1.49	Cecilia María Gutiérrez (CRC)	1.43
Long jump	Ana María Porras (CRC)	5.35	Ana Lucía Camargo (GUA)	5.31	Ana Mariella Roca (ESA)	5.13
Triple jump	Ana Lucía Camargo (GUA)	11.01	Amy Roldán (ESA)	10.63	Thelma Fuentes (GUA)	10.57
Shot put	Mercedes Aquino (ESA)	9.59	Justa Guzmán (GUA)	8.94	Kristin Castillo (CRC)	8.88
Discus throw	Justa Guzmán (GUA)	28.80	Kristin Castillo (CRC)	27.66	Brenda Villalobos (ESA)	27.57
Hammer throw	Fabiola Jovel (ESA)	37.89	Edith Cortés (NCA)	32.42	Mercedes Aquino (ESA)	24.68
Javelin throw	Lorena Medina (ESA)	37.27	Cecilia María Gutiérrez (CRC)	33.83	Natasha Rodríguez (CRC)	33.81
Heptathlon	Andrea Melgar (ESA)	3269 CR	Daniela Jubis (ESA)	2871	Andreina Gaitán (CRC)	2685
5000 metres Walk	Brendis Zeledón (NCA)	25:38.0	Mónica Vásquez (ESA)	25:40.1	Linda Hernández (ESA)	26:40.5
4 x 100 metres relay	Costa Rica; Yolide Solís; Shantelly Scott; Kimberly Morales; Ana María Porras	49.53	El Salvador; Amy Roldán; Bessy Flores; Iris Santamaría; Lissette Mejía	50.06	Guatemala; Alejandra Menéndez; Claudia Villeda; Ruth Morales; Thelma Fuentes	52.59
1000m Medley relay (100m x 200m x 300m x 400m)	Costa Rica; Ana María Porras; Kimberly Morales; Shantelly Scott; Yolide Solís	2:19.17	El Salvador; Lissette Mejía; Iris Santamaría; Bessy Flores; Brenda Salmerón	2:20.88	Nicaragua; Cony Villalobos; Janahi Cornejo; Mariángeles Escobar; Stephanie Sánchez	2:27.28

== Medal table ==
The medal was published.

* Host nation (El Salvador)

Rank	Nation	Gold	Silver	Bronze	Total
1	El Salvador (ESA)*	21	22	21	64
2	Panama (PAN)	17	5	4	26
3	Costa Rica (CRC)	14	16	26	56
4	Guatemala (GUA)	11	20	15	46
5	Nicaragua (NIC)	9	7	7	23
6	Honduras (HON)	4	5	2	11
7	Belize (BIZ)	1	2	1	4
Totals (7 entries)		77	77	76	230

== Team trophies ==
The placing table for team trophy awarded to the 1st place overall team (boys and girls categories) was published.

=== Overall ===
The host country is highlighted in lavender blue

Rank	Nation	Points
1st place, gold medalist(s)	El Salvador	426
2	Costa Rica	384
3	Guatemala	302
4	(Panama) Panamá	184
5	Nicaragua	181
6	Belize	79
7	Honduras	75

== Participation ==
A total number of 372 athletes were reported to participate in the event.

- Belize (31)
- Costa Rica (97)
- El Salvador (66)
- Guatemala (69)
- Honduras (38)
- Nicaragua (47)
- (Panama) Panamá (24)
