= 2013 Central American Junior and Youth Championships in Athletics =

XXVI Central American Junior and XXI Central American Youth Championships in Athletics
- Dates: May 24–26
- Host city: San José, Costa Rica
- Venue: Estadio Nacional
- Level: Junior and Youth
- Events: 83 (41 boys, 42 girls)
- Participation: 6 nations
- Records set: 22

The 2013 Central American Junior and Youth Championships in Athletics took place on May 24–26, 2013. The event was held at the Estadio Nacional in San José, Costa Rica. Organized by the Central American Isthmus Athletic Confederation (CADICA), it was the 26th edition of the Junior (U-20) and the 21st edition of the Youth (U-18) competition. A total of 83 events were contested, 20 by junior boys, 21 by junior girls, 21 by youth boys, and 21 by youth girls. A total of 22 new championship records were set. Overall winner on points was Costa Rica.

== Medal summary ==
Complete results can be found on the CADICA and FECOA webpages.

=== Junior ===
==== Boys (U-20) ====
Event	Gold		Silver		Bronze	
100 metres (wind: +0.4 m/s)	Jaimar Hardy; Costa Rica	10.84	Diego Alejandro Prado; Guatemala	11.13	Juan Roso Mosquera; Panama	11.17
200 metres (wind: +1.2 m/s)	Gerald David Drummond; Costa Rica	21.69	Diego Alejandro Prado; Guatemala	22.22	Donald Alberto Arias; Costa Rica	22.30
400 metres	Gerald David Drummond; Costa Rica	48.72	David Benjamen Hodgson; Costa Rica	49.01	Donald Alberto Arias; Costa Rica	50.14
800 metres	Víctor Emilio Ortiz; Costa Rica	1:53.43	David Benjamen Hodgson; Costa Rica	1:54.21	Kevin José Gómez; Nicaragua	2:00.69
1500 metres	Georman Antonio Rivas; Costa Rica	3:57.50 CR	Víctor Emilio Ortiz; Costa Rica	4:03.64	Julio Evenezzer; Nicaragua	4:04.57
5000 metres	Georman Antonio Rivas; Costa Rica	15:10.53 CR	Edwin Haroldo Pirir; Guatemala	15:14.40	Julio Evenezzer; Nicaragua	15:31.62
10000 metres	Edwin Haroldo Pirir; Guatemala	32:08.19	Julio Evenezzer; Nicaragua	32:43.18	Walter Domingo Yac; Guatemala	34:55.23
3000 metres steeplechase	David Alexander Escobar; El Salvador	9:57.24	Nestor Antonio Mijangos; Guatemala	10:06.49	José Enrique Calvo; Costa Rica	10:20.12
110 metres hurdles^{†} (wind: -1.9 m/s)	Ronald Edyberto Ramírez; Guatemala	15.65	Emmanuel Niño; Costa Rica	16.05	Christopher Leiton; Costa Rica	18.49
400 metres hurdles	Gerald David Drummond; Costa Rica	54.15	Maríano Miranda; Costa Rica	56.75	Emmanuel Niño; Costa Rica	58.06
Pole vault	Josué Francisco Berrocal; Costa Rica	3.70	Juan Carlos Aguirre; El Salvador	3.50		
Long jump	Juan Roso Mosquera; Panama	6.97	Ronald Edyberto Ramírez; Guatemala	6.42	Keiner Joley Arboine; Costa Rica	6.42
Triple jump	Juan Roso Mosquera; Panama	14.60 (wind: -1.5 m/s)	Marcos Daniel Aldana; Guatemala	13.08 (wind: +0.9 m/s)	Christopher Leiton; Costa Rica	12.63 (wind: -1.4 m/s)
Shot put	Ronald Alexander Alvarenga; El Salvador	15.63	Ever Orlando Acajabón; Guatemala	14.50	Tomas Chong; Panama	13.60
Discus throw	Ever Orlando Acajabón; Guatemala	47.10	Magno Enrique Escobar; Guatemala	44.96	José Francisco Araya; Costa Rica	39.51
Hammer throw	Otto Steve Vivas; Guatemala	43.44	Luis Fernando Hidalgo; Costa Rica	41.89	Cesar Miguel Villarreal; Costa Rica	41.73
Javelin throw	Raylinds Joel Delgado; Nicaragua	55.77	Jonathan Cedeño; Panama	52.99	Anastacio Fidel Buitrago; Panama	47.63
Decathlon	Andre Nohel Campos; Costa Rica	4917 pts	José Pablo Porras; Costa Rica	4746 pts	Abel de Jesús García; Panama	4498 pts
4 x 100 metres relay	Panama; Leonel Stiven Renwick; Andrew James Morgan; Diego Alberto Sánchez; Juan Roso Mosquera	43.12	Guatemala; Ronald Edyberto Ramírez; Esvin Josué Sánchez; Marcos Daniel Aldana; Diego Alejandro Prado	45.36	Honduras; Miguel Angel Villanueva; Angel Eduardo Ramos; Kipros Daniel Flores; Cesar Alberto Lagos	46.52
4 x 400 metres relay	Costa Rica; Donald Alberto Arias; Gerald David Drummond; David Benjamen Hodgson; Víctor Emilio Ortiz	3:18.17	Panama; Julio Enrique Powell; Andrew James Morgan; Diego Alberto Sánchez; Abel de Jesús García	3:29.66	Guatemala; Nestor Antonio Mijangos; Francisco Javier León; Edwin Haroldo Pirir; Diego Alejandro Prado	3:34.44

^{†}: Event without points for team score.

==== Girls (U-20) ====
Event	Gold		Silver		Bronze	
100 metres (wind: +0.8 m/s)	Glenda Lynell Davis; Costa Rica	12.19 CR	Sharolyn Zullay Joseph; Costa Rica	12.24	Nathalee Joane Aranda; Panama	12.37
200 metres (wind: NWI)	Glenda Lynell Davis; Costa Rica	24.93 CR	Nathalee Joane Aranda; Panama	25.35	Katia Cecilia Pozuelo; El Salvador	25.54
400 metres	Ingrid Yahosca Narváez; Nicaragua	58.01 CR	Gabriela Shimara Guevara; Panama	59.02	Beatriz Eugenia Flamenco; El Salvador	59.77
800 metres	Jaqueline Andrea Montoya; Costa Rica	2:21.20	Sefora Victoria Ramírez; Guatemala	2:24.30	Stephanie Ledezma; Costa Rica	2:24.77
1500 metres	Sefora Victoria Ramírez; Guatemala	5:00.15	Jaqueline Andrea Montoya; Costa Rica	5:02.43	Elia Sofia Lazo; El Salvador	5:03.07
3000 metres^{†}	Elia Sofia Lazo; El Salvador	11:16.20	María Isabel Flores; Costa Rica	12:30.33	Susan Francini Campos; Costa Rica	13:28.83
5000 metres^{†}	Jaqueline Noemi Mejía; Guatemala	20:11.68	María Isabel Flores; Costa Rica	21:49.22	Susan Francini Campos; Costa Rica	24:19.98
3000 metres steeplechase^{†}	Meyling Azalia Hernández; Nicaragua	14:21.65				
100 metres hurdles (wind: +0.4 m/s)	Kaila Xiomara Smith; Panama	14.44 CR	Beatriz Eugenia Flamenco; El Salvador	15.30	María Renee Gómez; El Salvador	16.33
400 metres hurdles	Kaila Xiomara Smith; Panama	1:03.52 CR	Gabriela Shimara Guevara; Panama	1:07.05	Yilibeth Danibeth Stephens; Panama	1:15.84
High jump^{†}	Ana María Martínez; Panama	1.64				
Pole vault^{†}	Catherine Andrea Ramos; El Salvador	3.20 CR				
Long jump	Nathalee Joane Aranda; Panama	5.37 (wind: +0.9 m/s)	María Renee Gómez; El Salvador	4.95 (wind: +0.3 m/s)		
Triple jump^{†}	Ana María Martínez; Panama	11.57 (wind: -1.5 m/s)	María Renee Gómez; El Salvador	10.64 (wind: +0.4 m/s)		
Shot put	Ayleen Lucia González; Panama	9.97	Haydee Grijalba; Costa Rica	9.81	Dagmar Yariel Alvarado; Panama	9.68
Discus throw	Haydee Grijalba; Costa Rica	34.89	Ayleen Lucia González; Panama	31.22	Cristiana Isabel Campos; Costa Rica	24.11
Hammer throw^{†}	Dagmar Yariel Alvarado; Panama	45.81 CR	Cristiana Isabel Campos; Costa Rica	28.02		
Javelin throw	Haydee Grijalba; Costa Rica	37.52	Rosa Angélica Barrera; Guatemala	27.01	Melida Ruth Núñez; Nicaragua	23.75
Heptathlon	Jessica Margarita López; El Salvador	3893 pts	Kaila Xiomara Smith; Panama	3860 pts	Rosa Angélica Barrera; Guatemala	3780 pts
4 x 100 metres relay	Panama; Nathalee Joane Aranda; Kaila Xiomara Smith; Ana María Martínez; Gabriela Shimara Guevara	48.09 CR	Costa Rica; Glenda Lynell Davis; Sharolyn Zullay Joseph; Alison Cristina Jiménez; Jaqueline Andrea Montoya	49.34	El Salvador	49.50
4 x 400 metres relay	Panama; Gabriela Shimara Guevara; Kaila Xiomara Smith; Nathalee Joane Aranda; Yilibeth Danibeth Stephens	4:03.42	Costa Rica; Stephanie Ledezma; Jaqueline Andrea Montoya; Glenda Lynell Davis; Yuliana Alondra Araya	4:06.47	El Salvador; Beatriz Eugenia Flamenco; Katia Cecilia Pozuelo; Elia Sofia Lazo; Catherine Andrea Ramos	4:15.45

^{†}: Event without points for team score.

=== Youth ===
==== Boys (U-18) ====
Event	Gold		Silver		Bronze	
100 metres (wind: +0.4 m/s)	Arturo Deliser; Panama	10.81 CR	Douglas Ricardo Orellana; Guatemala	11.19	Malcom Jamal Mitchell; Panama	11.28
200 metres (wind: -0.4 m/s)	Arturo Deliser; Panama	21.61 CR	Douglas Ricardo Orellana; Guatemala	22.74	Joseph Julean Hodgson; Costa Rica	22.91
400 metres	Miguel Angel Ortega; Panama	48.80 CR	Jeffry Moises Arcia; Nicaragua	49.38	Joseph Julean Hodgson; Costa Rica	49.84
800 metres	Jeffry Moises Arcia; Nicaragua	1:54.58 CR	Luis Gustavo Solórzano; El Salvador	1:56.99	Josué Francisco Murcia; Costa Rica	1:57.61
1500 metres	Luis Gustavo Solórzano; El Salvador	4:03.21	Petter Jossuee Vega; Panama	4:10.66	Kenneth David Porras; Costa Rica	4:10.97
3000 metres	Luis Gustavo Solórzano; El Salvador	9:18.13	Petter Jossuee Vega; Panama	9:22.41	Jorge Luis Nicaragua; Nicaragua	9:22.45
2000 metres steeplechase	Andres Mauricio Rivera; Costa Rica	6:26.31	José Vladimir Maravilla; El Salvador	6:44.07	Jeison Alejandro Poveda; Costa Rica	6:50.14
110 metres hurdles (wind: -1.0 m/s)	Gino Alfredo Toscano; Panama	15.10	Andres Josué Acosta; Costa Rica	15.15	Nagdiel Gabriel Chiari; Panama	15.41
400 metres hurdles	Miguel Angel Ortega; Panama	55.86	René Rafael Perla; El Salvador	56.16	Alonso Alberto Rodríguez; Panama	58.21
High jump	Emmanuel Eduardo Arias; Panama	1.90	Jaime Enrique Escobar; Panama	1.80	Alexis Josué Amaya; El Salvador	1.77
Pole vault	Alejandro Rafael Melara; El Salvador	4.20 CR	Natan Armando Rivera; El Salvador	3.40	Bryan Josué Guatemala; El Salvador	3.40
Long jump	Malcom Jamal Mitchell; Panama	6.55	José Miguel Ramos; El Salvador	6.55	Nagdiel Gabriel Chiari; Panama	6.45
Triple jump	Keilor Steven Araya; Costa Rica	14.02 (wind: +0.3 m/s)	Emmanuel Eduardo Arias; Panama	13.48 (wind: +1.5 m/s)	José Miguel Ramos; El Salvador	13.39 (wind: +1.5 m/s)
Shot put	Hugo Antonio Gonzales; Guatemala	14.64	Irving Joshue Villareal; Panama	13.68	Pablo Abarca; Costa Rica	13.40
Discus throw	Pablo Abarca; Costa Rica	40.28	Irving Joshue Villareal; Panama	39.23	Hugo Antonio Gonzales; Guatemala	38.57
Hammer throw	Pablo José Tejeda; Guatemala	41.51	José David Aguirre; Nicaragua	41.13	Emerson Nicolas Sobalvarro; Nicaragua	40.61
Javelin throw	Marlon Josué Pineda; Nicaragua	46.98	Yeison Morales; Costa Rica	43.93	Kenjiro Maejec Carcamo; Nicaragua	43.40
Octathlon	Humberto José Lugo; Nicaragua	4449 pts	Carlos Alfredo Rodríguez; Costa Rica	4034 pts	Marcos Steve Novo; Costa Rica	3838 pts
10000 metres Walk	Oscar Armando Menjívar; El Salvador	46:37.80	Oscar Mario Oviedo; Costa Rica	49:06.44	Gerson Otoniel Navas; El Salvador	50:14.18
4 x 100 metres relay	Costa Rica; José Alejandro Araya; Joseph Julean Hodgson; Oscar Alfonso Porras; Cristian Josué Arias	44.95	Nicaragua; Jeffry Moises Arcia; Luis Fernando Alfaro; Humberto José Lugo; Marlon Josué Pineda	45.54	Guatemala; Luis Andres Solórzano; Douglas Ricardo Orellana; Luis José Morazan; Kevin Andre Colocho	45.67
Medley relay	Panama; Arturo Deliser; Gino Alfredo Toscano; José Abdul Demera; Miguel Angel Ortega	1:57.06 CR	Nicaragua; Humberto José Lugo; Luis Fernando Alfaro; Jeffry Moises Arcia; Marlon Josué Pineda	2:00.06	Costa Rica; José Alejandro Araya; Joseph Julean Hodgson; Cristian Josué Arias; Oscar Alfonso Porras	2:00.95

==== Girls (U-18) ====
Event	Gold		Silver		Bronze	
100 metres (wind: +1.0 m/s)	Andrea Carolina Vargas; Costa Rica	12.41 =CR	Evelyn Nicole Harriman; Panama	12.72	Jennifer Paola Zúñiga; Costa Rica	12.95
200 metres (wind: -0.4 m/s)	Kianeth Maylin Galván; Panama	26.64	Sofia Isabel Carias; El Salvador	27.35	Jennifer Paola Zúñiga; Costa Rica	27.75
400 metres	Kianeth Maylin Galván; Panama	57.60	Leyka Itzel Archibold; Panama	58.11	Karol Tatiana Montoya; Costa Rica	58.57
800 metres	Karol Tatiana Montoya; Costa Rica	2:16.26	Ana Mirta Hércules; El Salvador	2:17.51	Siugey Pamela Gutiérrez; Costa Rica	2:20.65
1500 metres	Ana Mirta Hércules; El Salvador	4:48.81	María Floridalma Bac; Guatemala	4:51.59	Josselyn Jazmin Grijalva; El Salvador	4:52.70
3000 metres	Ana Mirta Hércules; El Salvador	10:20.40	María Floridalma Bac; Guatemala	10:35.19	Josselyn Jazmin Grijalva; El Salvador	10:50.43
2000 metres steeplechase	Irma Margarita Aldana; El Salvador	7:43.12 CR	Alejandra Hernández; Costa Rica	7:50.53	Rosa Celina Escobar; El Salvador	7:50.90
100 metres hurdles (wind: +0.5 m/s)	Naomi Priscilla Smith; Costa Rica	15.25	Dayana Liseth Monegro; Panama	15.32	María Murillo; Costa Rica	16.08
400 metres hurdles	Andrea Carolina Vargas; Costa Rica	1:03.61 CR	Leyka Itzel Archibold; Panama	1:04.59	Daniela Rojas; Costa Rica	1:06.74
High jump	Eimmy Patricia Campos; Panama	1.62	Abigail Patricia Obando; Costa Rica	1.62	Ana Sofia Aguilar; Guatemala	1.56
Pole vault	Andrea Michelle Velasco; El Salvador	3.00 CR	Valeria María Bonilla; El Salvador	2.50	Karen de los Angeles Somoza; Costa Rica	2.30
Long jump	Stephanie Sofia Silva; Guatemala	4.99 (wind: +0.9 m/s)	Jennifer Paola Zúñiga; Costa Rica	4.89 (wind: +0.5 m/s)	Yessenia Maribel Menéndez; Guatemala	4.86 (wind: +1.4 m/s)
Triple jump^{†}	Yessenia Maribel Menéndez; Guatemala	10.70 (wind: -1.4 m/s)	Karen de los Angeles Somoza; Costa Rica	10.45 (wind: -0.9 m/s)	Magaly Ines Carvajal; Costa Rica	9.56 (wind: +0.5 m/s)
Shot put	Sabrina Denise Gaitán; Guatemala	12.55	Naomi Priscilla Smith; Costa Rica	11.68	Sonja Gissell Moreno; Guatemala	11.44
Discus throw	Sabrina Denise Gaitán; Guatemala	37.89	Alma Ondina Guitierrez; Honduras	29.57	Sonja Gissell Moreno; Guatemala	25.27
Hammer throw^{†}	Sabrina Denise Gaitán; Guatemala	60.67 CR	Daniela Francini Cortez; Costa Rica	36.65	Sonja Gissell Moreno; Guatemala	31.38
Javelin throw^{‡}	Graciela María Vásquez; Costa Rica	32.84 CR^{‡}	Idania Vanessa Abarca; El Salvador	31.50	Hazel Walquiria Bonilla; Nicaragua	30.39
Heptathlon	Karla Esmeralda Molina; El Salvador	3706 pts	Daniela Rojas; Costa Rica	3622 pts	Priscila María Montero; Costa Rica	3054 pts
5000 metres Walk	Madeleine Alicia Grave; Guatemala	27:50.63	Indira Valeska Narváez; Nicaragua	29:03.72	Alicia María Vargas; Costa Rica	30:12.55
4 x 100 metres relay	Costa Rica; Andrea Carolina Vargas; Jennifer Paola Zúñiga; María Murillo; Naomi Priscilla Smith	49.75	Panama; Leyka Itzel Archibold; Evelyn Nicole Harriman; Yaritzel Castillo; Kianeth Maylin Galván	50.92	El Salvador	53.35
Medley relay	Panama; Evelyn Nicole Harriman; Kianeth Maylin Galván; Dayana Liseth Monegro; Leyka Itzel Archibold	2:17.08	Costa Rica; Siugey Pamela Gutiérrez; Jennifer Paola Zúñiga; María Murillo; Andrea Carolina Vargas	2:18.84	El Salvador; Ana Mirta Hércules; Andrea Michelle Velasco; Sofia Isabel Carias; María Alejandra Cruz	2:26.03

^{†}: Event without points for team score.
^{‡}: This year, a 500g javelin (rather than 600g as before) was used.

== Medal table (unofficial) ==
* Host nation (Costa Rica)

Rank	Nation	Gold	Silver	Bronze	Total
1	Costa Rica*	25	27	31	83
2	Panama	24	18	11	53
3	Guatemala	14	15	10	39
4	El Salvador	14	13	15	42
5	Nicaragua	6	6	8	20
6	Honduras	0	1	1	2
Totals (6 entries)		83	80	76	239

== Team trophies ==
The placing table for team trophy awarded to the 1st place overall team (boys and girls categories) was published.

=== Overall ===
The host country is highlighted in lavender blue

Rank	Nation	Points
1st place, gold medalist(s)	Costa Rica	351
2	(Panama) Panamá	238
3	El Salvador	174
4	Guatemala	166
5	Nicaragua	99
6	Honduras	15

=== Boys ===
==== Junior (U-20) ====
The host country is highlighted in lavender blue

Rank	Nation	Points
1st place, gold medalist(s)	Costa Rica	110
2	Guatemala	64
3	(Panama) Panamá	41
4	Nicaragua	28
5	El Salvador	20
6	Honduras	7

==== Youth (U-18) ====
The host country is highlighted in lavender blue

Rank	Nation	Points
1st place, gold medalist(s)	(Panama) Panamá	88
2	Costa Rica	83
3	El Salvador	54
4	Nicaragua	48
5	Guatemala	34

=== Girls ===
==== Junior (U-20) ====
The host country is highlighted in lavender blue

Rank	Nation	Points
1st place, gold medalist(s)	(Panama) Panamá	60
2	Costa Rica	60
3	El Salvador	36
4	Guatemala	20
5	Nicaragua	14

==== Youth (U-18) ====
The host country is highlighted in lavender blue

Rank	Nation	Points
1st place, gold medalist(s)	Costa Rica	98
2	El Salvador	64
3	(Panama) Panamá	49
4	Guatemala	48
5	Nicaragua	9
6	Honduras	8

== Participation ==
A total number of 247 athletes and 43 officials were reported to participate in the event.

- Costa Rica (89)
- El Salvador (35)
- Guatemala (37)
- Honduras (14)
- Nicaragua (26)
- Panama (46)
