= Central American Junior and Youth Championships in Athletics =

Youth Championships

The Central American Junior and Youth Championships in Athletics (Spanish: Campeonatos Centroamericanos Juvenil A y B) is an athletics event organized by the Central American Isthmus Athletic Confederation (CADICA) (Spanish: Confederación Atlética del Istmo Centroamericano) open for athletes from member associations.

The event is divided into the Junior B Central American Championships and the Junior A Central American Championships. The Junior A category is open for girls and boys aged 18–19. The Junior B category is open for girls and boys aged 15–17. There is a report on an early Central American Junior Championship held in the year 1975 in Guatemala. At least from 1997 on, it is verified that the competition is held annually. Records can be set by both Junior (U-20) and Youth (U-18) athletes who compete at the championships in their category representing one of CADICA's member federations.

== Editions ==
The following list was compiled from the CADICA website, and from a variety of articles from the archives of a variety of different newspapers.

| Edition Junior/Youth | Year | City | Country | Date | Venue | No. of Athletes | Winner Team Ranking |
|---|---|---|---|---|---|---|---|
| | 1975 | Guatemala City | Guatemala | | | | |
| | 1994 | | | June | | | |
| | 1995 | San Salvador | El Salvador | August 19–21 | | | |
| X / V | 1997 | Guatemala City | Guatemala | June 20–22 | | | |
| XI / VI | 1998 | | Nicaragua | May 29–30 | | | |
| XII / VII | 1999 | Puerto Barrios | Guatemala | June 12–13 | | | |
| XIII / VIII | 2000 | San José | Costa Rica | June 16–18 | Estadio Nacional | 561 | Costa Rica |
| XIV / IX | 2001 | San Salvador | El Salvador | September 21–23 | | | |
| XV / X | 2002 | Guatemala City | Guatemala | May 24–26 | Estadio Nacional Doroteo Guamuch Flores | | |
| XVI / XI | 2003 | San José | Costa Rica | September 4–6 | Estadio Nacional | 301 | Costa Rica |
| XVII / XII | 2004 | San José | Costa Rica | June 11–12 | Estadio Nacional | 279 | Costa Rica |
| XVIII / XIII | 2005 | Managua | Nicaragua | May 21–22 | Estadio Olímpico Instituto Nicaragüense de Juventud y Deportes | 250 | Costa Rica |
| XIX / XIV | 2006 | Guatemala City | Guatemala | May 11–13 | Estadio Cementos Progreso | | Guatemala |
| XX / XV | 2007 | San Salvador | El Salvador | May 25–27 | Estadio Nacional Flor Blanca "Magico Gonzalez" | 320 | Costa Rica |
| XXI / XVI | 2008 | San Salvador | El Salvador | July 19–20 | Estadio Nacional Flor Blanca "Magico Gonzalez" | 372 | El Salvador |
| XXII / XVII | 2009 | San Salvador | El Salvador | May 16–17 | Estadio Nacional Flor Blanca "Magico Gonzalez" | 218 | Guatemala |
| XXIII / XVIII | 2010 | Panama City | Panama | May 28–29 | Estadio Rommel Fernandez | 250 | Costa Rica |
| XXIV / XIX | 2011 | San Salvador | El Salvador | June 18–19 | Estadio Nacional Flor Blanca "Magico Gonzalez" | 245 | Costa Rica |
| XXV / XX | 2012 | San Salvador | El Salvador | May 25–27 | Estadio Nacional Flor Blanca "Magico Gonzalez" | 301 | Costa Rica |
| XXVI / XXI | 2013 | San José | Costa Rica | May 24–26 | Estadio Nacional | 247 | Costa Rica |
| XXVII / XXII | 2014 | Managua | Nicaragua | May 23–25 | Estadio de Atletismo del Instituto Nicaragüense de Deportes | 332 | Guatemala |
| XXVIII / XXIII | 2015 | San Salvador | El Salvador | May 22–24 | Estadio Nacional Flor Blanca "Magico Gonzalez" | | Guatemala |
| XXIX / XXIV | 2016 | San José | Costa Rica | May 20–22 | Estadio Nacional | 319 | Costa Rica |
| XXX / XXV | 2017 | Managua | Nicaragua | July 28–30 | Estadio Olímpico del IND Managua | 345 | Guatemala |
| XXXI / XXVI | 2018 | San Salvador | El Salvador | June 1–3 | Estadio Nacional Jorge "Magico" Gonzalez | 247 | El Salvador |
| XXXII / XXVII | 2019 | San Salvador | El Salvador | May 17–19 | Estadio Nacional Jorge "Magico" Gonzalez | 274 | Costa Rica |
| XXXIII / XXVIII | 2021 | Managua | Nicaragua | July 30–August 1 | Estadio Olímpico del IND Managua | 148 | Guatemala |
| XXXIV / XXIX | 2022 | Managua | Nicaragua | June 17–19 | Estadio Olímpico del IND Managua | 203 | Costa Rica |
| XXXV / XXX | 2023 | Guatemala City | Guatemala | June 3–4 | Estadio Cementos Progreso | | Costa Rica |
| XXXVI / XXXI | 2024 | San José | Costa Rica | May 18–19 | Estadio Nacional | | |

== Junior records ==
=== Boys (U-20) ===
| Event | Record | Athlete | Nationality | Date | Championships | Place | Ref. |
|---|---|---|---|---|---|---|---|
| 100 m | 10.46 (−0.1 m/s) | Mateo Edward | Panama | 25 May 2012 | 2012 Championships | San Salvador, El Salvador | |
| 200 m | 21.08 (−1.2 m/s) | Alonso Edward | Panama | 27 May 2007 | 2007 Championships | San Salvador, El Salvador | |
| 400 m | 46.90 | Antonio Grant | Panama | 2 June 2018 | 2018 Championships | San Salvador, El Salvador | |
| 800 m | 1:49.95 | Juan Castro Villalobos | Costa Rica | 1 June 2018 | 2018 Championships | San Salvador, El Salvador | |
| 1500 m | 3:54.68 | Mario Pacay | Guatemala | 13 June 2015 | 2015 Championships | San Salvador, El Salvador | |
| 5000 m | 14:31.11 | Mario Pacay | Guatemala | 12 June 2015 | 2015 Championships | San Salvador, El Salvador | |
| 10,000 m | 31:11.93 | Mario Pacay | Guatemala | 14 June 2015 | 2015 Championships | San Salvador, El Salvador | |
| 3000 m steeplechase | 9:23.14 | Erick Rodríguez | Nicaragua | 16 May 2009 | 2009 Championships | San Salvador, El Salvador | |
| 110 m hurdles | 14.06 s (+1.6 m/s) | Renan Palma | El Salvador | 19 July 2008 | 2008 Championships | San Salvador, El Salvador | |
| 400 m hurdles | 51.88 | José Humberto Bermúdez | Guatemala | 28 July 2017 | 2017 Managua | Managua, Nicaragua | |
| High jump | 2.11 m | Jaime Escobar Valdivieso | Panama | 12 June 2015 | 2015 Championships | San Salvador, El Salvador | |
| Pole vault | 4.81 m | Natán Rivera | El Salvador | 30 July 2017 | 2017 Managua | Managua, Nicaragua | |
| Long jump | 7.51 m | Irving Saladino | Panama | 24 May 2002 | 2002 Guatemala | Guatemala City, Guatemala | |
| Triple jump | 15.63 m (+0.8 m/s) | Jason Castro | Honduras | 29 May 2010 | 2010 Panamá | Panama City, Panama | |
| Shot put | 16.58 m | Bryan Méndez | Costa Rica | 18 June 2011 | 2011 San Salvador | San Salvador, El Salvador | |
| Discus throw | 49.00 m | Marlón Queme | Guatemala | 29 July 2017 | 2017 Managua | Managua, Nicaragua | |
| Hammer throw | 64.24 m | Enrique Martinez Florez | El Salvador | 30 July 2017 | 2017 Managua | Managua, Nicaragua | |
| Javelin throw | 60.90 m | Rowie Miranda | Panama | 21 May 2016 | 2016 Championships | San José, Costa Rica | |
| Decathlon | 6121 pts | Darwin Colón | Honduras | 12–13 May 2006 | 2006 Guatemala | Guatemala City, Guatemala | |
| Decathlon | 100m / Long jump / Shot put / High jump / 400m / 110m H / Discus / Pole vault / Javelin / 1500m | | | | | | |
| 10,000 m walk (track) | 42:51.82 | José Eduardo Ortiz | Guatemala | 2 June 2018 | 2018 Championships | San Salvador, El Salvador | |
| 4 × 100 m relay | 42.04 | Arturo Deliser; Gino Toscano; Jaime Smith; Erick Aguirre | Panama | 21 May 2016 | 2016 Championships | San José, Costa Rica | |
| 4 × 400 m relay | 3:13.51 | Gerald Drummond; Cesar Andrey Vásquez; David Hodgson; Luis Alonso Murillo | Costa Rica | 27 May 2012 | 2012 San Salvador | San Salvador, El Salvador | |

=== Girls (U-20) ===
| Event | Record | Athlete | Nationality | Date | Championships | Place | Ref. |
|---|---|---|---|---|---|---|---|
| 100 m | 11.66 (−0.2 m/s) NR | Mariandreé Chacón | Guatemala | 17 June 2022 | 2022 Championships | Managua, Nicaragua | |
| 200 m | 24.93 (NWI) | Glenda Davis | Costa Rica | 25 May 2013 | 2013 San José | San José, Costa Rica | |
| 400 m | 54.93 | Daniela Rojas Gutiérrez | Costa Rica | 22 May 2016 | 2016 San José | San José, Costa Rica | |
| 800 m | 2:12.81 | Brenda Salmerón | El Salvador | 16 May 2009 | 2009 El Salvador | San Salvador, El Salvador | |
| 1500 m | 4:40.77 | Brenda Salmerón | El Salvador | 17 May 2009 | 2009 El Salvador | San Salvador, El Salvador | |
| 3000 m | 10:26.41 | Noelia Vargas | Costa Rica | 3 June 2018 | 2018 El Salvador | San Salvador, El Salvador | |
| 5000 m | 18:14.91 | Noelia Vargas | Costa Rica | 1 June 2018 | 2018 El Salvador | San Salvador, El Salvador | |
| 10,000 m | 38:04.45 | Eugenia Allen | Costa Rica | 24 May 2002 | 2002 Guatemala | Guatemala City, Guatemala | |
| 100 m hurdles | 13.80 (+0.8 m/s) | Andrea Carolina Vargas | Costa Rica | 24 May 2014 | 2014 Managua | Managua, Nicaragua | |
| 400 m hurdles (76.2 cm) | 1:00.66 | Daniela Rojas Gutiérrez | Costa Rica | 20 May 2016 | 2016 Championships | San José, Costa Rica | |
| 3000 m steeplechase | 11:44.88 | Irma Margarita Aldana | El Salvador | 22 May 2016 | 2016 Championships | San José, Costa Rica | |
| High jump | 1.68 m | Kashany Ríos | Panama | 29 May 2010 | 2010 Panamá | Panama City, Panama | |
| Pole vault | 3.51 m | Andrea Michelle Velasco | El Salvador | 20 May 2016 | 2016 Championships | San José, Costa Rica | |
| Long jump | 5.80 m | Estefany Cruz | Guatemala | 19 July 2008 | 2008 Championships | San Salvador, El Salvador | |
| Triple jump | 12.32 m (±0.0 m/s) | Nancy Sandoval | El Salvador | 30 July 2017 | 2017 Managua | Managua, Nicaragua | |
| Shot put | 11.94 m | Nathyan Catano | Panama | 5 September 2003 | 2003 San José | San José, Costa Rica | |
| Discus throw | 44.67 m | Aixa Middleton | Panama | 26 May 2007 | 2007 Championships | San Salvador, El Salvador | |
| Hammer throw | 53.79 m | Sabrina Gaitán | Guatemala | 14 June 2015 | 2015 El Salvador | San Salvador, El Salvador | |
| Javelin throw | 48.05 m | Dalila Rugama | Nicaragua | 6 September 2003 | 2003 San José | San José, Costa Rica | |
| Heptathlon | 4364 pts | Stephanie Grant | Costa Rica | 19–20 August 1995 | 1995 San Salvador | San Salvador, El Salvador | |
| Heptathlon | 100m H / High jump / Shot put / 200m / Long jump / Javelin / 800m; 16.09 / 1.64 m / 6.78 m / 26.12 / 5.21 m / 24.20 m / 2:23.09 | | | | | | |
| 10,000 m walk (track) | 48:37.27 | Noelia Vargas | Costa Rica | 2 June 2018 | 2018 Championships | San Salvador, El Salvador | |
| 4 × 100 m relay | 48.09 | Nathalee Joane Aranda; Kaila Xiomara Smith; Ana María Martínez; Gabriela Shimara Guevara | Panama | 25 May 2013 | 2013 San José | San José, Costa Rica | |
| 4 × 400 m relay | 3:53.95 | María Segura Vargas; Lissette Ramírez Núñez; Alejandra Murillo Barrantes; Daniela Rojas Gutiérrez | Costa Rica | 22 May 2016 | 2016 Championships | San José, Costa Rica | |

== Youth records ==
Key: Defunct event

=== Boys (U-18) ===
| Event | Record | Athlete | Nationality | Date | Championships | Place | Ref. |
|---|---|---|---|---|---|---|---|
| 100 m | 10.78 (−0.5 m/s) | Arturo Deliser | Panama | 23 May 2014 | 2014 Managua | Managua, Nicaragua | |
| 200 m | 21.61 | Arturo Deliser | Panama | 25 May 2013 | 2013 San José | San José, Costa Rica | |
| 400 m | 48.51 | Antonio Grant | Panama | 22 May 2016 | 2016 Championships | San José, Costa Rica | |
| 800 m | 1:52.03 | Juan Diego Castro Villalobos | Costa Rica | 20 May 2016 | 2016 Championships | San José, Costa Rica | |
| 1500 m | 3:59.69 | Juan Diego Castro Villalobos | Costa Rica | 22 May 2016 | 2016 Championships | San José, Costa Rica | |
| 3000 m | 8:48.11 | Roy Vargas | Costa Rica | 19 August 1995 | 1995 San Salvador | San Salvador, El Salvador | |
| 110 m hurdles (91 cm) | 13.94 (NWI) | Wienstan Mena | Guatemala | 13 June 2015 | 2015 Championships | San Salvador, El Salvador | |
| 400 m hurdles (84 cm) | 53.26 | Pablo Ibáñez | El Salvador | 12 June 2015 | 2015 Championships | San Salvador, El Salvador | |
| 2000 m steeplechase | 6:15.80 | Allan Rodriguez Mata | Costa Rica | 3 June 2018 | 2018 El Salvador | San Salvador, El Salvador | |
| High jump | 1.97 m | Francisco Rodriguez Castaneda | El Salvador | 28 July 2017 | 2017 Managua | Managua, Nicaragua | |
| Pole vault | 4.21 m | Natán Armando Rivera | El Salvador | 25 May 2014 | 2014 Managua | Managua, Nicaragua | |
| Long jump | 7.02 m | Juan Mosquera | Panama | 18 June 2011 | 2011 San Salvador | San Salvador, El Salvador | |
| Triple jump | 14.93 m | Jason Castro | Honduras | 20 July 2008 | 2008 Championships | San Salvador, El Salvador | |
| Shot put | 15.34 m | Pablo Abarca | Costa Rica | 23 May 2014 | 2014 Managua | Managua, Nicaragua | |
| Discus throw | 45.79 m | José Francisco Araya | Costa Rica | 26 May 2012 | 2012 Championships | San Salvador, El Salvador | |
| Hammer throw | 62.76 m | Rodrigo Moran Gaitan | Guatemala | 3 June 2018 | 2018 Championships | San Salvador, El Salvador | |
| Javelin throw | 67.93 m | Armando Abdiel Caballero | Panama | 1 June 2018 | 2018 Championships | San Salvador, El Salvador | |
| Decathlon | 6240 pts | Mauricio Galindo Vega | Guatemala | 29–30 July 2017 | 2017 Managua | Managua, Nicaragua | |
| Decathlon | 100m / Long jump / Shot put / High jump / 400m / 110m H / Discus / Pole vault / Javelin / 1500m; 11.69 (+1.2 m/s) / 6.25 m (−1.6 m/s) / 13.83 m / 1.84 m / 53.08 / 15.38 (+1.0 m/s) / 33.64 m / 3.20 m / 41.48 m / 4:50.05 | | | | | | |
| 10,000 m walk (track) | 44:05.92 | Oseas Abimael Accu | Guatemala | 2 June 2018 | 2018 Championships | San Salvador, El Salvador | |
| 4 × 100 m relay | 43.18 | Keiner Arboine; Kluiverth Nuñez; Sebastian Alonso Piza; Kayle Farguharson | Costa Rica | 30 July 2017 | 2017 Managua | Managua, Nicaragua | |
| Medley relay | 1:57.06 | Arturo Deliser; Gino Alfredo Toscano; José Abdul Demera; Miguel Angel Ortega | Panama | 25 May 2013 | 2013 San José | San José, Costa Rica | |

=== Girls (U-18) ===
| Event | Record | Athlete | Nationality | Date | Championships | Place | Ref. |
|---|---|---|---|---|---|---|---|
| 100 m | 11.90 (+0.1 m/s) | Selena Arjona | Panama | 20 May 2016 | 2016 Championships | San José, Costa Rica | |
| 200 m | 24.86 (+1.7 m/s) | Rosa Benita Baltazar | Guatemala | 22 May 2016 | 2016 Championships | San José, Costa Rica | |
| 400 m | 56.78 | Kathi Cuadra | Nicaragua | 29 May 2010 | 2010 Panamá | Panama City, Panama | |
| 800 m | 2:10.66 | Brenda Salmerón | El Salvador | 25 May 2007 | 2007 Championships | San Salvador, El Salvador | |
| 1500 m | 4:38.73 | Brenda Salmerón | El Salvador | 26 May 2007 | 2007 Championships | San Salvador, El Salvador | |
| 3000 m | 10:14.39 | Ana Hercules | El Salvador | 12 June 2015 | 2015 Championships | San Salvador, El Salvador | |
| 100 m hurdles | 14.10 | Verónica Quijano | El Salvador | 21 June 1997 | 1997 Guatemala | Guatemala City, Guatemala | |
| 400 m hurdles | 63.61 | Andrea Vargas | Costa Rica | 24 May 2013 | 2013 San José | San José, Costa Rica | |
| 2000 m steeplechase | 7:24.45 | Irma Aldana | El Salvador | 14 June 2015 | 2015 Championships | San Salvador, El Salvador | |
| High jump | 1.67 m | Kashani Ríos | Panama | 20 July 2008 | 2008 Championships | San Salvador, El Salvador | |
| Pole vault | 3.21 m | Fátima Soto | El Salvador | 21 May 2016 | 2016 Championships | San José, Costa Rica | |
| Long jump | 5.72 m (+0.2 m/s) | Nathalee Aranda | Panama | 18 June 2011 | 2011 San Salvador | San Salvador, El Salvador | |
| Triple jump | 12.23 m (+1.4 m/s) | Nancy Sandoval | El Salvador | 22 May 2016 | 2016 Championships | San José, Costa Rica | |
| Shot put (3.0 kg) | 13.37 m | Jennifer Rodriguez | Panama | 30 July 2017 | 2017 Managua | Managua, Nicaragua | |
| Discus throw | 40.07 m | Sabrina Gaitán | Guatemala | 24 May 2014 | 2014 Managua | Managua, Nicaragua | |
| Hammer (3.0 kg) | 62.49 m | Sabrina Gaitán | Guatemala | 25 May 2014 | 2014 Managua | Managua, Nicaragua | |
| Javelin throw (500 g) | 46.47 m | Jennifer Rodríguez | Panama | 29 July 2017 | 2017 Managua | Managua, Nicaragua | |
| Javelin throw (600 g) | 47.64 m | Jannis Ramírez | Nicaragua | 11 June 2004 | 2004 San José | San José, Costa Rica | |
| Heptathlon | 3830 pts | Victoria Grenni Alvarado | El Salvador | 1–2 June 2018 | 2018 El Salvador | San Salvador, El Salvador | |
| Heptathlon | 100m H / High jump / Shot put / 200m / Long jump / Javelin / 800m; 16.27 (+1.6 m/s) / 1.52 m / 8.33 m / 27.13 (−0.3 m/s) / 4.10 m (+1.7 m/s) / 24.67 m / 2:40.13 | | | | | | |
| 5000 m walk (track) | 23:31.28 | Jamy Franco | Guatemala | 25 May 2007 | 2007 Championships | San Salvador, El Salvador | |
| 4 × 100 m relay | 49.23 | Mariella Eugenia Mena; Camila María Eserski; Mikaela María Rank; Nancy Gabriela Sandoval | El Salvador | 21 May 2016 | 2016 Championships | San José, Costa Rica | |
| Swedish relay | 2:15.99 | Eugenia Stargarten; Ingrid Narváez; Kathi Cuadra; Vanessa Romero | Nicaragua | 29 May 2010 | 2010 Panamá | Panama City, Panama | |
