= 2009 Central American Junior and Youth Championships in Athletics =

XXII Central American Junior and XVII Central American Youth Championships in Athletics
- Dates: May 16–17
- Host city: San Salvador, El Salvador
- Venue: Estadio Nacional Flor Blanca "Magico Gonzalez"
- Level: Junior and Youth
- Events: 72 + 8 exhibition (39 + 2 boys, 33 + 6 girls)
- Participation: 218 athletes from 5 nations
- Records set: 16

The 2009 Central American Junior and Youth Championships in Athletics were held at the Estadio Nacional Flor Blanca "Magico Gonzalez" in San Salvador, El Salvador, between May 16–17, 2009. Organized by the Central American Isthmus Athletic Confederation (CADICA), it was the 22nd edition of the Junior (U-20) and the 17th edition of the Youth (U-18) competition. A total of 80 (including 8 exhibition) events were contested, 41 (including 2) by boys and 39 (including 6) by girls. Overall winner on points was Guatemala.

== Medal summary ==
Complete results can be found on the CADICA webpage.

=== Junior ===
==== Boys (U-20) ====
Event	Gold		Silver		Bronze	
100 metres (wind: -2.0 m/s)	Renan Palma (ESA)	11.03	Joseph Norales (HON)	11.16	José Miguel Solórzano (GUA)	11.33
200 metres (wind: -0.8 m/s)	Renan Palma (ESA)	22.23	Darwin López (GUA)	22.95	Daniel Alemán (NCA)	23.05
400 metres	Arnoldo Monge (CRC)	49.60	Benjamín Rodríguez (GUA)	50.68	Deiber Rubi (CRC)	51.12
800 metres	Arnoldo Monge (CRC)	1:56.30	Noel Mairena (NCA)	1:56.52	Marco Carrillo (GUA)	1:58.89
1500 metres	Erick Rodríguez (NCA)	3:57.99 CR	José Raxón (GUA)	4:06.87	Noel Mairena (NCA)	4:07.52
5000 metres	José Raxón (GUA)	15:28.92 CR	Luis Mendoza (GUA)	16:29.43	Elmer Ramírez (ESA)	16:58.06
3000 metres steeplechase	Erick Rodríguez (NCA)	9:23.14	Jhonathan Cardoza (ESA)	10:10.98	Ernesto Saborío (CRC)	10:18.68
110 metres hurdles (wind: 2.3 m/s)	Renan Palma (ESA)	14.02 w	Querson García (GUA)	15.60 w	Jean Víquez (CRC)	16.33 w
400 metres hurdles	Debris Henry (GUA)	57.85	Deiber Rubi (CRC)	59.21	René Aguilar (ESA)	63.43
High jump	Allen Calderón (NCA)	1.81	Carl Dapson (CRC)	1.78	Jean Víquez (CRC); Byron Nolberto (GUA)	1.75
Pole vault	Andrés Bermúdez (CRC)	3.30	Mario Meza (CRC)	3.30		
Long jump	Jason Castro (HON)	6.96	Daniel Herrera (CRC)	6.34	Querson García (GUA)	6.21
Triple jump	Jason Castro (HON)	15.10 CR	Sydney Fearon (GUA)	13.22	Julio Arguedas (CRC)	12.66
Shot put	Mario McKenzie (CRC)	11.99	Andrés Chacón (CRC)	11.35	Mario Saldivar (GUA)	11.25
Discus throw	Winston Campbell (HON)	43.81	Cristian Jovel (ESA)	38.46	Mario McKenzie (CRC)	37.77
Hammer throw	Julio Aldana (GUA)	38.82	Andrés Chacón (CRC)	35.33	Cristian Jovel (ESA)	32.61
Javelin throw	Erick Méndez (CRC)	54.45	Freddy Villalobos (CRC)	51.90	Antony Gómez (GUA)	47.56
Decathlon	Marco Rodríguez (ESA)	5107	Rafael Carmona (NCA)	5075	José Carballo (CRC)	4607
10,000 metres Walk	Patrick Mathuz (GUA)	49:04.39	César Martínez (ESA)	52:57.0		
4 x 100 metres relay	Guatemala; Benjamín Rodríguez; Darwin López; José Miguel Solórzano; Querson García	43.91	Costa Rica; Andrés Bermúdez; Daniel Herrera; José Garita; Andre Carmona	44.77	Nicaragua; José Veliz; Daniel Alemán; Rafael Carmona; Allen Calderón	46.65
4 x 400 metres relay	Costa Rica; Arnoldo Monge; Keileb Gordon; Jaicol Peart; Deiber Rubi;	3:22.2	Guatemala; Benjamín Rodríguez; Darwin López; Francisco Castellanos; Debris Henry	3:28.8	Nicaragua; Noel Mairena; José Veliz; Daniel Alemán; Rafael Carmona	3:31.1

==== Girls (U-20) ====
Event	Gold		Silver		Bronze	
100 metres (wind: -1.1 m/s)	Shantelly Scott (CRC)	12.53	Lissette Mejía (ESA)	13.16	Joanna Ubico (GUA)	14.45
200 metres (wind: 4.4 m/s)	Shantelly Scott (CRC)	25.39	Stephanie Zamora (CRC)	25.70	Yolide Solís (CRC)	26.30
400 metres^{†}	Stephanie Zamora (CRC)	58.16	Yolide Solís (CRC)	58.94	Bessy Flores (ESA)	60.80
800 metres	Brenda Salmerón (ESA)	2:12.81 CR	Gladys Hernández (ESA)	2:12.82	Susana Chan (CRC)	2:29.75
1500 metres	Brenda Salmerón (ESA)	4:40.77 CR	Gladys Hernández (ESA)	4:41.32	Sheila Araya (CRC)	5:00.81
3000 metres	Brenda Salmerón (ESA)	10:26.60 CR	Ingrid Solís (GUA)	10:59.34	Mary Tec (GUA)	11:04.45
5000 metres	Ingrid Solís (GUA)	19:03.4	Mary Tec (GUA)	19:06.9	Blanca Solís (ESA)	19:16.3
3000 metres steeplechase^{†}	Blanca Solís (ESA)	12:11.54	Susana Chan (CRC)	14:06.85		
100 metres hurdles (wind: 1.0 m/s)	Ana María Porras (CRC)	14.98 CR	Claudia Villeda (GUA)	16.13	Bessy Flores (ESA)	16.73
400 metres hurdles	Ana María Porras (CRC)	65.37	Bessy Flores (ESA)	66.45	Claudia Villeda (GUA)	74.64
Long jump	Ana María Porras (CRC)	5.72	Marcela Blandón (CRC)	4.60		
Triple jump	Nicole Carboni (CRC)	10.56				
Shot put^{†}	Génova Arias (CRC)	9.66	Daniela Jubis (ESA)	9.34	Katherine Agüero (CRC)	8.88
Discus throw^{†}	Génova Arias (CRC)	30.97	Daniela Jubis (ESA)	28.23	Katherine Agüero (CRC)	23.13
Hammer throw^{†}	Edith Cortés (NCA)	30.95	Katherine Agüero (CRC)	29.75		
Javelin throw	Génova Arias (CRC)	44.10	Adriana Morales (GUA)	36.07	María Obando (CRC)	29.75
Heptathlon	Nicole Carboni (CRC)	3358	Yizel Méndez (GUA)	3196	Mayreth Soto (CRC)	2444
10,000 metres Walk	Jamy Franco (GUA)	51:41.39 CR	Linda Paz (ESA)	53:15.84	Mónica Vásquez (ESA)	53:39.99
4 x 100 metres relay	Costa Rica; Ana María Porras; Yolide Solís; Stephanie Zamora; Shantelly Scott	49.45	El Salvador; Bessy Flores; Brenda Salmerón; Gladys Hernández; Blanca Solís	51.06		
4 x 400 metres relay	Costa Rica; Ana María Porras; Yolide Solís; Stephanie Zamora; Shantelly Scott	3:57.68 CR	El Salvador; Bessy Flores; Brenda Salmerón; Gladys Hernández; Blanca Solís	4:11.79		

^{†}: Treated as exhibition contest (no medals and no points).

=== Youth ===
==== Boys (U-18) ====
Event	Gold		Silver		Bronze	
100 metres (wind: -1.2 m/s)	Kemner Watson (CRC)	11.19	Helson Pitillo (HON)	11.24	Julio Rivera (GUA)	11.55
200 metres (wind: 2.3 m/s)	Kemner Watson (CRC)	22.44 w	Rober Trigueño (GUA)	22.50 w	Helson Pitillo (HON)	22.53 w
400 metres	Rober Trigueño (GUA)	49.87 =CR	Óscar Cuellar (ESA)	50.74	Víctor Castro (ESA)	51.07
800 metres	Víctor Castro (ESA)	2:00.00	Carlos Tello (GUA)	2:00.45	Roger Castellón (NCA)	2:01.47
1500 metres	Carlos Aguilar (ESA)	4:06.76 CR	Roger Castellón (NCA)	4:11.56	Allan Cordero (CRC)	4:12.84
3000 metres	Carlos Aguilar (ESA)	9:14.14	Fredy Ruano (GUA)	9:24.11	Marvel Xol (GUA)	9:26.06
2000 metres steeplechase	Carlos Aguilar (ESA)	6:21.5	Allan Cordero (CRC)	6:30.9	Fredy Ruano (GUA)	6:40.9
110 metres hurdles (wind: 1.0 m/s)	Keiner Shion (CRC)	14.92	Marlon Colorado (ESA)	15.08	Antonio Flamenco (ESA)	15.23
400 metres hurdles	José Chorro (ESA)	57.82	Gerber Blanco (GUA)	59.21	Ghino Ramírez (ESA)	59.46
High jump	Marlon Colorado (ESA)	1.86	Kevin Córdova (GUA)	1.74	William Figueroa (CRC)	1.71
Pole vault^{†}	Jeison Quiros (CRC)	2.80	Antonio Flamenco (ESA)	2.50		
Long jump^{†}	Marlon Colorado (ESA)	6.54	Seilik Gamboa (GUA)	6.45	Jairo Guerra (GUA)	6.33
Shot put	Enrique Gaitán (GUA)	13.66 CR	Carlos Escobar (ESA)	13.22	Denis Linares (HON)	12.42
Discus throw	Carlos Escobar (ESA)	41.81 CR	Ronaldo Blanco (CRC)	36.70	Francisco Samayoa (GUA)	35.09
Hammer throw	Enrique Gaitán (GUA)	62.63 CR	Miguel Celma (ESA)	36.18	Ronaldo Blanco (CRC)	35.41
Javelin throw	Nils Pira (GUA)	44.07	Saúl Estrada (GUA)	43.97	Andrés Herrera (NCA)	37.37
Octathlon	Juan Rivas (ESA)	4524 pts	Nils Pira (GUA)	4349 pts	Miguel Martínez (HON)	3871 pts
10,000 metres Walk	Juan Hernández (GUA)	47:15.44 CR	Nelson Pérez (GUA)	50:19.18	Héctor Mendoza (NCA)	1:02:01.68
4 x 100 metres relay	Costa Rica; Keiner Shion; Jeremy González; Allan Cordero; Kemner Watson	44.96	El Salvador; Marlon Colorado; José Chorro; Miguel Rivas; Antonio Flamenco	46.04		
1000m Medley relay (100m x 200m x 300m x 400m)	Guatemala; Jairo Guerra; Gerber Blanco; Rober Trigueño; Julio Rivera	2:02.75	El Salvador; Marlon Colorado; José Chorro; Óscar Cuellar; Víctor Castro	2:03.59	Costa Rica; Keiner Shion; Jeremy González; William Figueroa; Kemner Watson	2:08.24

^{†}: Treated as exhibition contest (no medals and no points).

==== Girls (U-18) ====
Event	Gold		Silver		Bronze	
100 metres (wind: -1.6 m/s)	Tatiana Zamora (CRC)	12.95	Cristina Anelise Aldana (GUA)	13.29	Melda Ramírez (GUA)	13.32
200 metres (wind: 0.2 m/s)	Iris Santamaría (ESA)	26.19	Tatiana Zamora (CRC)	26.37	Melda Ramírez (GUA)	26.63
400 metres	Kathi Cuadra (NCA)	58.79	Melda Ramírez (GUA)	62.40	Karen Rojas (CRC)	62.53
800 metres	Kathi Cuadra (NCA)	2:23.64	Diana Gutiérrez (GUA)	2:27.68	Andrea Vásquez (CRC)	2:29.14
1500 metres	Diana Gutiérrez (GUA)	5:22.74	Leslie Martínez (GUA)	5:23.79	Lisseth Noguera (NCA)	5:26.69
3000 metres	Diana Gutiérrez (GUA)	12:31.27	Lisseth Noguera (NCA)	12:32.82	Andrea Vásquez (CRC)	12:34.10
100 metres hurdles (wind: 1.2 m/s)	Iris Santamaría (ESA)	15.42	Jessica Sánchez (CRC)	15.74	María Menéndez (GUA)	16.32
400 metres hurdles	Iris Santamaría (ESA)	68.77	Liliana Méndez (GUA)	70.17	María Menéndez (GUA)	71.94
High jump^{†}	Ligia Paniagua (CRC)	1.40	Liliana Méndez (GUA)	1.40	Melissa Delgado (CRC)	1.35
Long jump	Thelma Fuentes (GUA)	5,27 w (wind: 4.4 m/s)	Jessica Sánchez (CRC)	5,17 w (wind: 2.2 m/s)	Cristina Anelise Aldana (GUA)	5,16 w (wind: 3.7 m/s)
Triple jump	Thelma Fuentes (GUA)	11.46	Amy Roldán (ESA)	11.46	Ligia Paniagua (CRC)	10.51
Shot put	Stephanie Zúñiga (CRC)	10.36	Mercedes Aquino (ESA)	9.92	Linda Acevedo (NCA)	8.51
Discus throw	Stephanie Zúñiga (CRC)	27.72	Mercedes Aquino (ESA)	27.25	Xenia Mauricio (ESA)	26.47
Hammer throw	Ana Harry (HON)	36.88	Xenia Mauricio (ESA)	28.33	Mercedes Aquino (ESA)	27.50
Javelin throw	Lorena Medina (ESA)	37.22	Natasha Rodríguez (CRC)	34.94	Sofía Alonso (GUA)	34.75
Heptathlon	Ruth Morales (GUA)	3377 pts CR	Vanessa Romero (NCA)	3241 pts	María Romualdo (ESA)	2812 pts
5000 metres Walk	Andrea Barrientos (GUA)	31:05.92	Darlin Rodríguez (ESA)	34:12.72		
4 x 100 metres relay	Costa Rica; Tatiana Zamora; Diana Garita; Jessica Sánchez; Karen Rojas	51.50	El Salvador; Amy Roldán; Iris Santamaría; María Romualdo; Vicky Guzmán	52.58		
1000m Medley relay (100m x 200m x 300m x 400m)	Costa Rica; Tatiana Zamora; Diana Garita; Jessica Sánchez; Karen Rojas	2:24.36	Guatemala; Cristina Anelise Aldana; Melda Ramírez; Liliana Méndez; María Menéndez	2:28.75	El Salvador; Amy Roldán; Iris Santamaría; Josselin Ramírez; Lorena Medina	2:30.47

^{†}: Treated as exhibition contest (no medals and no points).

== Medal table ==
The medal was published.

* Host nation (El Salvador)

Rank	Nation	Gold	Silver	Bronze	Total
1	Costa Rica	25	15	20	60
2	Guatemala	19	26	19	64
3	El Salvador*	19	23	13	55
4	Nicaragua	5	5	9	19
5	Honduras	4	2	3	9
Totals (5 entries)		72	71	64	207

== Team trophies ==
The placing table for team trophy awarded to the 1st place overall team (boys and girls categories) was published.

=== Overall ===
The host country is highlighted in lavender blue

Rank	Nation	Points
1st place, gold medalist(s)	Guatemala	303.5
2	El Salvador	285
3	Costa Rica	281.5
4	Nicaragua	80
5	Honduras	45

== Participation ==
A total number of 218 athletes were reported to participate in the event. Belize and Panamá did not send athletes.

- Costa Rica (53)
- El Salvador (54)
- Guatemala (81)
- Honduras (15)
- Nicaragua (15)
