= 2014 Central American Junior and Youth Championships in Athletics =

XXVII Central American Junior and Youth Championships in Athletics
- Host city: Managua, Nicaragua
- Venue: Estadio de Atletismo del Instituto Nicaragüense de Deportes
- Level: Junior and Youth
- Events: 86 (43 boys, 43 girls)
- Participation: 7 nations
- Records set: 17

The 2014 Central American Junior and Youth Championships in Athletics took place between May 23–25, 2014. The event was held at the Estadio de Atletismo del Instituto Nicaragüense de Deportes in Managua, Nicaragua. Organized by the Central American Isthmus Athletic Confederation (CADICA), it was the 27th edition of the Junior (U-20) and the 22nd edition of the Youth (U-18) competition. A total of 86 events were contested, 22 by junior boys, 22 by junior girls, 21 by youth boys, and 21 by youth girls. A total of 17 new championship records were set. Overall winner on points was Guatemala.

== Medal summary ==
Complete results can be found on the CADICA webpage.

=== Boys (U-20) ===
Event	Gold		Silver		Bronze	
100 metres (wind: -0.8 m/s)	Douglas Ricardo Orellana; Guatemala	10.95	Luis Antonio Salazar (Panama) Panamá	11.19	Luis Fernando Alfaro; Nicaragua	11.21
200 metres (wind: +1.7 m/s)	Douglas Ricardo Orellana; Guatemala	21.94	Jervis Anthony Myvette; Belize	21.94	Luis Antonio Salazar (Panama) Panamá	22.21
400 metres	Angel Eduardo Ramos; Honduras	49.66	Maríano Miranda; Costa Rica	50.60	Sherman Isidro Guity; Costa Rica	50.65
800 metres	Luis Gustavo Solórzano; El Salvador	1:55.10	Josué Francisco Murcia; Costa Rica	1:55.92	Mario Francisco Melgar; Guatemala	1:56.06
1500 metres	Luis Gustavo Solórzano; El Salvador	4:02.40	David Alexander Escobar; El Salvador	4:02.76	Mario Francisco Melgar; Guatemala	4:04.56
5000 metres	David Alexander Escobar; El Salvador	15:53.75	Alberto González; Guatemala	16:00.45	José Enrique Calvo; Costa Rica	16:04.07
10000 metres	Luis Gustavo Solórzano; El Salvador	34:34.65	Octaviano Sajche; Guatemala	35:00.93	Pedro López; Guatemala	35:19.47
110 metres hurdles (0.99m) (wind: +1.9 m/s)	Ronald Edyberto Ramírez; Guatemala	14.74	René Rafael Perla; El Salvador	15.24	Emmanuel Niño; Costa Rica	15.26
400 metres hurdles (0.91m)	Emmanuel Niño; Costa Rica	54.36	Maríano Miranda; Costa Rica	55.46	René Rafael Perla; El Salvador	55.94
3000 metres steeplechase (0.91m)	David Alexander Escobar; El Salvador	9:34.56	José Enrique Calvo; Costa Rica	9:43.73	Andres Mauricio Rivera; Costa Rica	10:19.43
High jump	Alexis Josué Amaya; El Salvador	1.84	Allan Dominique Najarro; Guatemala; Ronald Edyberto Ramírez; Guatemala	1.81		
Pole vault	Alejandro Rafael Melara; El Salvador	4.00	Esvin Josué Sánchez; Guatemala	3.50		
Long jump	Alexander Abdul Aguilar; Costa Rica	6.68 (wind: -0.3 m/s)	Ronald Edyberto Ramírez; Guatemala	6.62 (wind: -0.9 m/s)	Juan Gerardo Jiménez; El Salvador	6.21 (wind: +0.0 m/s)
Triple jump	Daniel Alberto Cabrera; Guatemala	13.92 (wind: +1.1 m/s)	Abraham Alberto Martínez; Guatemala	13.28 (wind: +0.4 m/s)	Keylor Steven Araya; Costa Rica	13.10 w (wind: +2.8 m/s)
Shot put (6.0 kg)	Hugo Antonio Gonzales; Guatemala	14.20	Robert Antonio Diaz; Costa Rica	13.39	José Omar Mora; Nicaragua	12.96
Discus throw (1.75 kg)	Magno Enrique Escobar; Guatemala	42.83	José Francisco Araya; Costa Rica	41.20	Hugo Antonio Gonzales; Guatemala	40.27
Hammer throw (6.0 kg)	Cesar Miguel Villarreal; Costa Rica	48.70	Steve Alexander Vivas; Guatemala	48.61	Kevin Rafael Linares; El Salvador	43.66
Javelin throw (800g)	Jonathan Javier Cedeño (Panama) Panamá	60.58 CR	Carlos Alberto Rodríguez; Honduras	53.58	Raylinds Joel Delgado; Nicaragua	52.65
Decathlon	Andre Nohel Campos; Costa Rica	5501	Fernando Atilano Jolon; Guatemala	5339	Andres Josué Acosta; Costa Rica	5265
10,000 metres track walk	Jürgen Everhard Grave; Guatemala	44:14.43	Albin Oliver Herrera; Nicaragua	49:48.34	Erick Gilberto Coc; Guatemala	52:41.00
4 x 100 metres relay	Guatemala; Allan Dominique Najarro; Alejandro Imeri; Douglas Ricardo Orellana; Ronald Edyberto Ramírez	42.80	Costa Rica; Joseph Julean Hodgson; Sherman Isidro Guity; Emmanuel Niño; Maríano Miranda	44.05	Belize; Auburn Anfernee Rivero; Jervis Anthony Myvette; Martin Sydney Flowers; Kelvin Kenneth Hendy	44.77
4 x 400 metres relay	Costa Rica; Bryant Aaron Madrigal; Emmanuel Niño; Maríano Miranda; Sherman Isidro Guity	3.23.10	Guatemala; Alejandro Imeri; Allan Dominique Najarro; Jasson Adonis Zepeda; Kevin Andre Colocho	3.25.35	Nicaragua; Angel Salvador Marenco; Humberto José Lugo; Jeffri Moises Arcia; Oneyker Edmanuel Aragón	3.29.50

=== Girls (U-20) ===
Event	Gold		Silver		Bronze	
100 metres (wind: -0.2 m/s)	Andrea Carolina Vargas; Costa Rica	12.35	Nathalee Joane Aranda (Panama) Panamá	12.62	Beatriz Eugenia Flamenco; El Salvador	12.78
200 metres (wind: +1.2 m/s)	Beatriz Eugenia Flamenco; El Salvador	25.71	Nathalee Joane Aranda (Panama) Panamá	25.95	Daneysha Shillesky Robinson; Costa Rica	26.62
400 metres	Siugey Pamela Gutiérrez; Costa Rica	1:00.33	María Alejandra Cruz; El Salvador	1:03.62	Sefora Victoria Ramírez; Guatemala	1:04.67
800 metres	Siugey Pamela Gutiérrez; Costa Rica	2:20.18	Sefora Victoria Ramírez; Guatemala	2:26.60	Meyling Azalia Hernández; Nicaragua	2:31.43
1500 metres	Wendy Beatriz Ascencio; El Salvador	4:53.66	Sefora Victoria Ramírez; Guatemala	5:00.87	Laura Isabel Co; Guatemala	5:08.79
3000 metres	Wendy Beatriz Ascencio; El Salvador	10:36.79	Laura Isabel Co; Guatemala	11:08.66	Priscila María Solis; Costa Rica	11:16.40
5000 metres	Wendy Beatriz Ascencio; El Salvador	18:38.58	Laura Isabel Co; Guatemala	19:52.58	Priscila María Solis; Costa Rica	20:13.09
100 metres hurdles (0.84m) (wind: +0.8 m/s)	Andrea Carolina Vargas; Costa Rica	13.80 CR	Kaila Xiomara Smith (Panama) Panamá	14.66	Beatriz Eugenia Flamenco; El Salvador	15.25
400 metres hurdles (0.76m)	Kaila Xiomara Smith (Panama) Panamá	1:02.69 CR	María Alejandra Cruz; El Salvador	1:09.13	Alejandra Hernández; Costa Rica	1:12.07
3000 metres steeplechase (0.76m)	Alba Marisol de León; Guatemala	12:35.33	Cristina Catarina Barreno; Guatemala	12:52.41	Alejandra Hernández; Costa Rica	13:14.07
High jump	Abigail Patricia Obando; Costa Rica	1.60	Stephanie Sofia Silva; Guatemala	1.60	Eimmy Patricia Campos (Panama) Panamá	1.55
Pole vault ^{*}	Catherine Andrea Ramos; El Salvador	2.50				
Long jump	Nathalee Joane Aranda (Panama) Panamá	5.56 (wind: +0.0 m/s)	Daneysha Shillesky Robinson; Costa Rica	5.51 (wind: +0.0 m/s)	Kaila Xiomara Smith (Panama) Panamá	4.87 (wind: +0.1 m/s)
Triple jump	Stephanie Sofia Silva; Guatemala	11.15 (wind: -0.9 m/s)	Karen de los Angeles Somoza; Costa Rica	10.24 w (wind: +2.1 m/s)	Eliette del Carmen Zeledón; Nicaragua	9.64 (wind: -0.2 m/s)
Shot put (4.0 kg)	Ayleen Lucia González (Panama) Panamá	11.68	Naomi Priscilla Smith; Costa Rica	11.23	Gloria Marydean Serano; Belize	10.98
Discus throw (1.0 kg)	Ayleen Lucia González (Panama) Panamá	39.92	Gloria Marydean Serano; Belize	33.67	Lucia Peralta; Costa Rica	27.97
Hammer throw (4.0 kg)	Cristiana Isabel Campos; Costa Rica	33.66	Flor de María Rodríguez; El Salvador	25.88	Jennifer Molina; Costa Rica	21.77
Javelin throw (600g)	Idania Vanessa Abarca; El Salvador	34.43	Jennifer Molina; Costa Rica	32.77	Hazel Walkiria Bonilla; Nicaragua	32.57
Heptathlon	Abigail Patricia Obando; Costa Rica	3308	Jackeline Odalis Cacao; Guatemala	2477	Dory Raquel Rodríguez; Guatemala	2281
10,000 metres track walk	Sonia Irene Barrondo; Guatemala	51:24.97 CR	Karin Clarissa Vicente; Guatemala	57:13.81	Amarilis Floricelda Caal; Guatemala	59:18.41
4 x 100 metres relay	Costa Rica; Abigail Patricia Obando; Daneysha Shillesky Robinson; Naomi Priscilla Smith; Andrea Carolina Vargas	50.24	Guatemala; Stephanie Sofia Silva; Ana Isabel Roldán; Jackeline Odalis Cacao; Dory Raquel Rodríguez	53.12	El Salvador; Beatriz Eugenia Flamenco; Katya Marcela Lovato; Catherine Andrea Ramos; María Alejandra Cruz	53.40
4 x 400 metres relay	Costa Rica; Andrea Carolina Vargas; Daneysha Shillesky Robinson; Monserrat Bolaños; Siugey Pamela Gutiérrez	4:08.50	El Salvador; Beatriz Eugenia Flamenco; Katya Marcela Lovato; María Alejandra Cruz; Wendy Beatriz Ascencio	4:17.10	Nicaragua; Genesis Massielle Guido; Hellen Soledad Toledo; Meyling Azalia Hernández; Tania Lizeth Carvajal	4:22.30

^{*}: No points for the team trophy

=== Boys (U-18) ===
Event	Gold		Silver		Bronze	
100 metres (wind: -0.5 m/s)	Jaime Osvaldo Smith (Panama) Panamá	10.78 CR	Arturo Deliser (Panama) Panamá	9.55	Cristian Josué Arias; Costa Rica	11.8
200 metres (wind: +0.3 m/s)	Jaime Osvaldo Smith (Panama) Panamá	21.86	Cristian Josué Arias; Costa Rica	22.79	Ariagner Steven Smith; Nicaragua	22.82
400 metres	Álvaro Emilio Víctor; Costa Rica	50.88	Ricardo Manuel Ortiz; El Salvador	51.60	Erling Dixon Gutiérrez; Nicaragua	51.90
800 metres	Becker Alexander Jarquín; Nicaragua	2:01.65	Rodrigo Alejandro Garnica; Guatemala	2:01.73	Marvin Alberto Santiago; Guatemala	2:03.62
1500 metres	Rodrigo Alejandro Garnica; Guatemala	4:12.11	Cesar Enrique Peraza; El Salvador	4:12.53	Marvin Alberto Santiago; Guatemala	4:14.76
3000 metres	Cesar Enrique Peraza; El Salvador	9:14.35	Kenneth Alexander Mejía; Costa Rica	9:25.44	Kevin Josué Moraga; Nicaragua	9:27.57
110 metres hurdles (0.91m) (wind: -1.2 m/s)	Gino Alfredo Toscano (Panama) Panamá	14.38 CR	Wienstan Christopher Mena; Guatemala	14.61	Youssef Ibrahim Qasem; Guatemala	16.09
400 metres hurdles (0.84m)	Pablo Andrés Ibáñez; El Salvador	55.57	Ricardo Manuel Ortiz; El Salvador	55.95	José Humberto Bermúdez; Guatemala	57.33
2000 metres steeplechase (0.91m)	Cesar Enrique Peraza; El Salvador	6:17.86 CR	Rodrigo Alejandro Garnica; Guatemala	6:17.89	José Vladimir Maravilla; El Salvador	6:20.88
High jump	Jaime Enrique Escobar (Panama) Panamá	1.96 CR	Emmanuel Eduardo Arias (Panama) Panamá	1.84	Fredy Enrique Lemus; Guatemala	1.84
Pole vault	Natán Armando Rivera; El Salvador	4.21 CR	Hasso Rogelio Rivera; Guatemala	3.50	Youssef Ibrahim Qasem; Guatemala	3.00
Long jump	Fredy Enrique Lemus; Guatemala	6.59 (wind: -1.3 m/s)	Emmanuel Eduardo Arias (Panama) Panamá	6.47 (wind: +0.6 m/s)	Jaryn Caliph Lino; Belize	6.24 (wind: -1.7 m/s)
Triple jump	Fredy Enrique Lemus; Guatemala	14.55 (wind: +0.6 m/s)	Emmanuel Eduardo Arias (Panama) Panamá	14.30 (wind: +0.8 m/s)	Jaryn Caliph Lino; Belize	13.67 (wind: +0.2 m/s)
Shot put (5.0 kg)	Pablo Abarca; Costa Rica	15.34 CR	Luis Iván Sandoval (Panama) Panamá	13.45	Enrique Aníbal Martínez; El Salvador	13.05
Discus throw (1.5 kg)	Pablo Abarca; Costa Rica	43.36	Eduardo José Ordóñez; Guatemala	41.16	Elias José Gómez; Costa Rica	40.04
Hammer throw (5.0 kg)	Mauricio Alonso Téllez; Costa Rica	43.99	José Eduardo Vásquez; Guatemala	43.59	Enrique Aníbal Martínez; El Salvador	43.18
Javelin throw (700g)	Kenjiro Maejec Carcamo; Nicaragua	53.39	Bryan Guillermo Valle; Honduras	48.31	Arturo Santiago Saballos; Nicaragua	44.85
Decathlon	Marvin Macias (Panama) Panamá	4889 CR	Christopher Alonso Rubi; Costa Rica	4792	Denzell George Pollack; Nicaragua	4422
10,000 metres track walk	Oscar Armando Menjivar; El Salvador	47:03.67	Sergio Daniel Sacul; Guatemala	48:02.60	Aníbal Xiquin; Guatemala	48:02.62
4 x 100 metres relay	Costa Rica; Daniel Espinoza; Cristian Josué Arias; José Alejandro Araya; John Keliner Rodríguez	44.03	Nicaragua; Alexander José Gómez; Ariagner Steven Smith; Carlos Alberto Arteaga; Aaron Josué Molina	44.41	El Salvador; Jesús Alberto Portillo; Daniel Isai Saravia; Pablo Andrés Ibáñez; Ricardo Manuel Ortiz	44.83
Medley relay	Nicaragua; Alberto José González; Ariagner Steven Smith; Becker Alexander Jarquín; Erling Dixon Gutiérrez	2:00.75	Costa Rica; Álvaro Emilio Víctor; Daniel Espinoza; John Keliner Rodríguez; José Alejandro Araya	2:01.29	El Salvador; Daniel Isai Saravia; Jesús Alberto Portillo; Pablo Andrés Ibáñez; Ricardo Manuel Ortiz	2:01.73

=== Girls (U-18) ===
Event	Gold		Silver		Bronze	
100 metres (wind: +0.8 m/s)	Mariella Eugenia Mena; El Salvador	12.86	Shanicka Augustine; Belize	12.92	María Murillo; Costa Rica	12.93
200 metres (wind: +3.8 m/s)	Leyka Itzel Archibold (Panama) Panamá	25.47 w	Sofia Isabel Carias; El Salvador	25.88 w	Jennifer Paola Zúñiga; Costa Rica	26.39 w
400 metres	Sofia Isabel Carias; El Salvador	59.55	Lissette Yulissa Ramírez; Costa Rica	59.55	Patricia Michelle Chávez; Guatemala	1.01.18
800 metres	Ana Mirta Hércules; El Salvador	2:15.23	Karol Tatiana Montoya; Costa Rica	2:22.98	Irma Margarita Aldana; El Salvador	2:23.18
1500 metres	Ana Mirta Hércules; El Salvador	4:40.23	María Floridalma Bac; Guatemala	4:53.38	Josselyn Jazmin Grijalva; El Salvador	4:55.31
3000 metres	Ana Mirta Hércules; El Salvador	10:24.11	Josselyn Jazmin Grijalva; El Salvador	10:39.34	Viviana Aroche; Guatemala	10:41.82
100 metres hurdles (0.76m) (wind: +0.4 m/s)	María Murillo; Costa Rica	15.46	Daniela Rojas; Costa Rica	15.48	Yessenia Maribel Menéndez; Guatemala	15.52
400 metres hurdles (0.76m)	Daniela Rojas; Costa Rica	1:04.79	Leyka Itzel Archibold (Panama) Panamá	1:04.96	Priscila María Montero; Costa Rica	1:08.46
2000 metres steeplechase ^{*}	Irma Margarita Aldana; El Salvador	7:29.09 CR	Chrisdyala Moraga; Costa Rica	7:52.36		
High jump	Julieta Fernanda Cruz; Guatemala	1.51	Magaly Ines Carvajal; Costa Rica	1.45	María Guadalupe Martínez; Nicaragua; Deania Chrislee Cooke; Belize	1.35
Pole vault	Andrea Michelle Velasco; El Salvador	3.20 CR	Fatima Yanira Soto; El Salvador	2.85	Ana Laura Alvarado; Costa Rica	2.20
Long jump	Shanicka Augustine; Belize	5.39 (wind: -1.1 m/s)	Rosa Marina Mosquera (Panama) Panamá	5.22 (wind: +0.0 m/s)	Nancy Gabriela Sandoval; El Salvador	5.21 (wind: -0.2 m/s)
Triple jump	Rosa Marina Mosquera (Panama) Panamá	11.20 (wind: -0.3 m/s)	Nancy Gabriela Sandoval; El Salvador	11.04 (wind: +1.9 m/s)	Ashanti Carr; Belize	10.98 (wind: +0.1 m/s)
Shot put (3.0 kg)	Sabrina Denise Gaitán; Guatemala	12.68	Carolyn Cristina Gutiérrez; Costa Rica	11.66	Gissell Alejandra Moreno; Guatemala	11.56
Discus throw (1.0 kg)	Sabrina Denise Gaitán; Guatemala	40.07 CR	Gissell Alejandra Moreno; Guatemala	33.28	Carolyn Cristina Gutiérrez; Costa Rica	32.76
Hammer throw (3.0 kg)	Sabrina Denise Gaitán; Guatemala	62.49 CR	Gissell Alejandra Moreno; Guatemala	43.15	Daniela Francini Cortes; Costa Rica	43.00
Javelin throw (500g)	Graciela María Vásquez; Costa Rica	35.70 CR	Krissia Nereyda Moreno; El Salvador	35.61	Sofia Abigail Ramírez; Costa Rica	32.75
Heptathlon	Priscila María Montero; Costa Rica	3726 CR	Karla Esmeralda Molina; El Salvador	3698	Keren Jeanneth Alemán; Guatemala	3198
5000 metres track walk	Arely Esmeralda Morales; Guatemala	26:06.08	Katia Vannessa Almendarez; El Salvador	27:11.87	Yasury Betzaida Palacios; Guatemala	27:56.65
4 x 100 metres relay	Costa Rica; María Murillo; Jennifer Paola Zúñiga; Yensie Larissa Navarro; Daniela Rojas	50.39	El Salvador; Mariella Eugenia Mena; Sofia Isabel Carias; Andrea Michelle Velasco; Nancy Gabriela Sandoval	50.73	Nicaragua; María Alejandra Carmona; Alexia Dayana Murillo; Sarahi Margarita Álvarez; Iris Daniela García	54.10
Medley relay	El Salvador; Ana Mirta Hércules; Nancy Gabriela Sandoval; Sofia Isabel Carias; Mariella Eugenia Mena	2:19.74	Costa Rica; Daniela Rojas; Karol Tatiana Montoya; Lissette Yulissa Ramírez; María Murillo	2:20.12	Guatemala; Valeria Beatriz Lezana; Patricia Michelle Chávez; Julieta Fernanda Cruz; Andrea Gabriela Lemus	2:23.41

^{*}: No points for the team trophy

== Medal table (unofficial) ==
* Host nation (Nicaragua)

Rank	Nation	Gold	Silver	Bronze	Total
1	El Salvador	26	17	14	57
2	Costa Rica	24	22	22	68
3	Guatemala	19	29	23	71
4	Panama	12	11	3	26
5	Nicaragua*	3	2	15	20
6	Belize	1	3	6	10
7	Honduras	1	2	0	3
Totals (7 entries)		86	86	83	255

== Team trophies ==
The placing table for team trophy awarded to the 1st place overall team (boys and girls categories) was published.

=== Overall ===
The host country is highlighted in lavender blue

Rank	Nation	Points
1st place, gold medalist(s)	Guatemala	333
2	Costa Rica	327
3	El Salvador	268
4	(Panama) Panamá	120
5	Nicaragua	111
6	Belize	50
7	Honduras	22

=== Boys ===
==== Junior (U-20) ====
The host country is highlighted in lavender blue

Rank	Nation	Points
1st place, gold medalist(s)	Guatemala	104
2	Costa Rica	89
3	El Salvador	57
4	Nicaragua	37
5	(Panama) Panamá	15
6	Honduras	11
7	Belize	7

==== Youth (U-18) ====
The host country is highlighted in lavender blue

Rank	Nation	Points
1st place, gold medalist(s)	Guatemala	78
2	El Salvador	66
3	Costa Rica	61
4	(Panama) Panamá	46
5	Nicaragua	45
6	Belize	15
7	Honduras	4

=== Girls ===
==== Junior (U-20) ====
The host country is highlighted in lavender blue

Rank	Nation	Points
1st place, gold medalist(s)	Costa Rica	90
2	Guatemala	73
3	El Salvador	61
4	(Panama) Panamá	60
5	Nicaragua	14
6	Belize	11
7	Honduras	2

==== Youth (U-18) ====
The host country is highlighted in lavender blue

Rank	Nation	Points
1st place, gold medalist(s)	Costa Rica	87
2	El Salvador	84
3	Guatemala	78
4	(Panama) Panamá	20
5	Belize	17
6	Nicaragua	7
7	Honduras	5

== Participation ==
A total number of 332 athletes (191 boys and 141 girls) were reported to participate in the event.

- Belize (20)
- Costa Rica (89)
- El Salvador (56)
- Guatemala (74)
- Honduras (10)
- Nicaragua (61)
- (Panama) Panamá (22)
