= Beatriz Flamenco =

Salvadoran hurdler

Personal information
- Born: 11 November 1995 (age 30)

Sport
- Country: El Salvador
- Sport: Track and field
- Event: 100 metres hurdles
- Updated on 29 August 2015

Beatriz Eugenia Flamenco Mira (born 11 November 1995) is a hurdler from El Salvador. She competed in the 100 metres hurdles event at the 2015 World Championships in Beijing without qualifying for the semifinals. She won three medals at the 2014 Central American Championships in Athletics, winning her hurdles speciality and helping her nation silver in two relay events.

Her personal best in the 100 metres hurdles is 14.53 seconds (-0.3 m/s) set in San José, Costa Rica, in 2015. This is the current national record.

== Competition record ==
Year	Competition	Venue	Position	Event	Notes
Representing El Salvador
2013	Central American Championships	Managua, Nicaragua	3rd	100 m hurdles	14.98
2014	Central American Championships	Tegucigalpa, Honduras	1st	100 m hurdles	15.21
2014	Central American Championships	Tegucigalpa, Honduras	2nd	4 × 100 m relay	49.75
2014	Central American Championships	Tegucigalpa, Honduras	2nd	4 × 400 m relay	4:04.55
2014	Pan American Sports Festival	Mexico City, Mexico	9th (h)	100 m hurdles	15.20
2015	Central American Championships	Managua, Nicaragua	4th	100 m hurdles	15.17 (w)
2015	Central American Championships	Managua, Nicaragua	2nd	4 × 100 m relay	48.83
2015	NACAC Championships	San José, Costa Rica	15th (h)	100 m hurdles	14.53
2015	World Championships	Beijing, China	37th (h)	100 m hurdles	14.77

== See also ==
- El Salvador at the 2015 World Championships in Athletics
