= 2005 Central American Junior and Youth Championships in Athletics =

XVIII Central American Junior and XIII Central American Youth Championships in Athletics
- Dates: May 21–22
- Host city: Managua, Nicaragua
- Venue: Estadio de Atletismo del Instituto Nicaragüense de Deportes
- Level: Junior and Youth
- Events: 80 (40 boys, 40 girls)
- Participation: 250 athletes from 4 nations
- Records set: 14

The 2005 Central American Junior and Youth Championships in Athletics were held at the Estadio de Atletismo del Instituto Nicaragüense de Deportes in Managua, Nicaragua, between May 21–22, 2005. Organized by the Central American Isthmus Athletic Confederation (CADICA), it was the 18th edition of the Junior (U-20) and the 13th edition of the Youth (U-18) competition. A total of 80 events were contested, 40 by boys and 40 by girls. Overall winner on points was Costa Rica.

== Medal summary ==
Complete results can be found on the CADICA and on the CACAC webpage.

=== Junior ===
==== Boys (U-20) ====
Event	Gold		Silver		Bronze	
100 metres (wind: +1.0 m/s)	Carlos Abaunza (NCA)	10.85	Andrés Rodríguez (PAN)	10.85	Luis Ángel Sandoval (GUA)	11.00
200 metres (wind: -0.6 m/s)	Jean Patrick Holwerda (GUA)	21.80	Andrés Rodríguez (PAN)	22.07	Luis Ángel Sandoval (GUA)	22.62
400 metres	Jean Patrick Holwerda (GUA)	48.57	Greivin González (CRC)	50.15	Ramón Rizo (NCA)	51.39
800 metres	Greivin González (CRC)	1:56.88	Camilo Quevedo (GUA)	1:57.24	Carlos Álvarez (GUA)	1:58.01
1500 metres	Carlos Álvarez (GUA)	4:07.66	Diego Vargas (CRC)	4:08.33	Aurelio Sánchez (NCA)	4:08.71
5000 metres	Dimas Castro (NCA)	16:10.19	Domingo Álvarez (GUA)	16:17.43	Walter Martínez (GUA)	16:19.00
10000 metres	Dimas Castro (NCA)	34:11.8	Carlos Fernández (CRC)	35.28.7	Juan Sánchez (PAN)	37.19.5
3000 metres steeplechase	Carlos Álvarez (GUA)	9:47.12	Domingo Álvarez (GUA)	9:56.69	Diego Vargas (CRC)	10:06.61
110 metres hurdles (wind: m/s)	Gary Robinson (CRC)	17.13	Miguel Pérez (CRC)	19.42		
400 metres hurdles	Camilo Quevedo (GUA)	53.82 CR	Allan Ayala (GUA)	55.77	Gary Robinson (CRC)	55.77
High jump	Anselmo Delgado (PAN)	2.02m CR	Carlos Baldizón (NCA)	1.93m	Pablo Figueroa (GUA)	1.93m
Pole vault	Hugo Céspedes (CRC)	3.25m	Elvis Jiménez (NCA)	3.15m	Reinel Núñez (CRC)	2.75m
Long jump	Jonathan Romero (PAN)	7.03m (wind: +1.4 m/s)	Marcos Gutiérrez (CRC)	6.97m w (wind: +3.4 m/s)	Felipe Brenes (CRC)	6.68m w (wind: +2.4 m/s)
Triple jump	Jonathan Romero (PAN)	14.05m (wind: -0.6 m/s)	Marcos Gutiérrez (CRC)	13.60m (wind: -0.4 m/s)	Henry Jaén (PAN)	13.48m (wind: -0.4 m/s)
Shot put	Roberto Sawyers (CRC)	14.53m CR	Ovidio Estrada (GUA)	14.50m	Juan Carlos Silva (GUA)	13.23m
Discus throw	Juan Carlos Silva (GUA)	44.27m CR	Roberto Sawyers (CRC)	43.12m	Emanuel Álvarez (CRC)	39.96m
Hammer throw	Jason Masís (CRC)	46.02m	Jairo Alvarado (CRC)	41.30m	Carlos Montiel (NCA)	31.03m
Javelin throw	Adrián Zepeda (NCA)	52.90m	Carlos Prado (GUA)	51.07m	Friwfel Quintero (PAN)	49.54m
Decathlon	José Randall Arias (CRC)	3537pts	Miguel Pérez (CRC)	2976pts		
10 Kilometres Walk	Yassir Cabrera (PAN)	46.31.40	Giancarlo Burrión (GUA)	47.29.22	Hugo Momotic (GUA)	49.27.10
4 x 100 metres relay	Costa Rica; Marcos Gutiérrez; Jorge Luis Jiménez; Daniel Montero; Elías Montero	42.93	Nicaragua; Carlos Abaunza; Ramiro Sandoval; Ramón Rizo; Michael John Williams	43.91	Guatemala; Luis Ángel Sandoval; Jean Patrick Holwerda; Edwin Barrientos; Allan Ayala	44.26
4 x 400 metres relay	Guatemala; Luis Ángel Sandoval; Camilo Quevedo; Jean Patrick Holwerda; Luis Carlos Bonilla	3:22.53 CR	Nicaragua; Carlos Abaunza; Léster González; Ramiro Sandoval; Ramón Rizo	3:33.01	Costa Rica; Greivin González; Leonardo Pereira; Marcos Gutiérrez; Kevin Leyton Rojas	4:52.37

==== Girls (U-20) ====
Event	Gold		Silver		Bronze	
100 metres (wind: +0.6 m/s)	Tracy Joseph (CRC)	12.26 CR	Daphne Hernández (GUA)	12.71	Melissa Del Cid (PAN)	12.77
200 metres (wind: -0.2 m/s)	Tracy Joseph (CRC)	25.46	Daphne Hernández (GUA)	26.51	Henriette Guadamuz (NCA)	26.68
400 metres	Ana Cecilia Castillo (GUA)	59.54	Karen Arce (CRC)	60.05	Delia Pamela Cordero (GUA)	62.73
800 metres	Karen Arce (CRC)	2:18.16 CR	Liliana Mora (CRC)	2:33.57		
1500 metres	Andrea Ferris (PAN)	4:56.70	Aldy Villalobos (NCA)	5:02.56	Maritza Chalí (GUA)	5:23.66
5000 metres	Andrea Ferris (PAN)	19:00.40	Aldy Villalobos (NCA)	19:49.81	Marta Xuyá (GUA)	20:12.81
10000 metres	Andrea Ferris (PAN)	41:31.53	Melissa González (CRC)	43:07.63	Marta Xuyá (GUA)	43:44.34
2000 metres steeplechase	Melissa González (CRC)	8:27.81 CR	Ángela Karina Marroquín (GUA)	9:34.22		
100 metres hurdles (wind: -0.5 m/s)	Farina Murillo (CRC)	16.12	Delia Pamela Cordero (GUA)	16.72	Angélica Hidalgo (CRC)	16.85
400 metres hurdles	Marcela González (CRC)	1:08.14	Delia Pamela Cordero (GUA)	1:09.23	Farina Murillo (CRC)	1:10.60
High jump	Alejandra Gómez (CRC)	1.65m	Inaly Morazan (NCA); Ana Lisbeth Castillo (GUA)	1.45m		
Pole vault	María José Rodas (GUA)	2.80m	Inaly Morazan (NCA)	2.20m		
Long jump	Alejandra Gómez (CRC)	5.22m w (wind: +5.0 m/s)	Ginna von Quednow (GUA)	5.12m (wind: +1.9 m/s)	Beatriz Willink (CRC)	5.06m w (wind: +6.6 m/s)
Triple jump	Sharon Ruiz (CRC)	11.45m	Ginna von Quednow (GUA)	9.94m		
Shot put	Aixa Middleton (PAN)	11.33m	Rebeca Murillo (CRC)	8.89m	Viviana Abarca (CRC)	8.88m
Discus throw	Aixa Middleton (PAN)	42.95m CR	Viviana Abarca (CRC)	36.03m	Karen Álvarez (NCA)	32.61m
Hammer throw	Viviana Abarca (CRC)	38.61m	Karen Álvarez (NCA)	31.42m	Marianela Fallas (CRC)	29.05m
Javelin throw	Mayelis Martínez (PAN)	30.21m	Elizabeth Sánchez (PAN)	29.61m	Jéssica Valverde (CRC)	25.91m
Heptathlon	Ginna von Quednow (GUA)	3804pts	Rebeca Murillo (CRC)	3432pts	Jennifer Ovares (CRC)	3347pts
5 Kilometres Walk	Mayra Pérez (GUA)	26:18.35	Glenda Ubeda (NCA)	26:42.61	Carolyn Hernández (CRC)	27:46.33
4 x 100 metres relay	Costa Rica; Angélica Hidalgo; Ilima Malavassi; Alexa Morales; Tracy Joseph	49.82	Guatemala; Daphne Hernández; Delia Pamela Cordero; Ginna von Quednow; Ana Cecilia Castillo	49.94	Nicaragua; Henriette Guadamuz; Aldy Villalobos; Inaly Morazan; Mayling Chavarría	50.74
4 x 400 metres relay	Costa Rica; Karen Arce; Beatriz Willink; Marcela González; Tracy Joseph	4:03.64	Guatemala; Daphne Hernández; Delia Pamela Cordero; Ginna von Quednow; Ana Cecilia Castillo	4:06.49	Nicaragua; Henriette Guadamuz; Aldy Villalobos; Inaly Morazan; Mayling Chavarría	4:12.43

=== Youth ===
==== Boys (U-18) ====
Event	Gold		Silver		Bronze	
100 metres (wind: +2.4 m/s)	José Garita (CRC)	11.42 w	Rodrigo Prahl (GUA)	11.57 w	José Deago (PAN)	11.64 w
200 metres	José Deago (PAN)	24.15	José Garita (CRC)	24.47	Eduardo Castillo (GUA)	24.49
400 metres	Eduardo Castillo (GUA)	53.79	Osvaldo Enríquez (CRC)	54.26	Mauricio Varela (CRC)	54.46
800 metres	Mauricio Varela (CRC)	2:05.92	Osvaldo Enríquez (CRC)	2:06.30	Carlos Montero (PAN)	2:08.92
1500 metres	Rocael Sis Sical (GUA)	4:27.38	José Madriz (CRC)	4:32.31	Ricardo Herrera (NCA)	4:32.54
3000 metres	Rocael Sis Sical (GUA)	9:46.54	José Madriz (CRC)	9:50.35	Nelson Sevilla (NCA)	9:51.40
2000 metres steeplechase	Joseph Aburto (NCA)	7:03.34	José Madriz (CRC)	7:03.91	Nelson Sevilla (NCA)	7:15.89
110 metres hurdles	Álvaro Castillo (NCA)	14.47	Víctor Acevedo (PAN)	15.68	Edgar Álvarez (GUA)	16.00
High jump	Marcel Palacio (NCA)	1.67m	Gerardo Hidalgo (CRC)	1.65m	Álvaro Castillo (NCA)	1.65m
Long jump	Daniel Herrera (CRC)	6.22m w (wind: +2.8 m/s)	Rodrigo Prahl (GUA)	6.21m (wind: +1.4 m/s)	Blas Osorio (PAN)	6.09m (wind: +1.9 m/s)
Triple jump	Blas Osorio (PAN)	12.57m (wind: -1.3 m/s)	Emilio Peña (NCA)	12.49m (wind: -1.4 m/s)	Rónald Elizondo (NCA)	12.38m (wind: -0.7 m/s)
Shot put	Jairo Jiménez (NCA)	12.68m	Jairo Alvarado (CRC)	12.45m	Aldosman Castro (NCA)	11.45m
Discus throw	Jairo Alvarado (CRC)	36.93m	Aldosman Castro (NCA)	35.15m	Cairo Martínez (NCA)	32.80m
Hammer throw	Jason Masís (CRC)	46.02m	Jairo Alvarado (CRC)	41.30m	Carlos Montiel (NCA)	31.03m
Javelin throw	Erasmo José Ramírez (NCA)	53.81m CR	Aldosman Castr (NCA)	33.15m	Gerardo Hidalgo (CRC)	29.64m
5 Kilometres Walk	Melvin González (NCA)	27:07.27	Mario Bran (GUA)	27:36.69	Esteban Quirós (CRC)	28:53.81
4 x 100 metres relay	Costa Rica; Mario González; Daniel Herrera; José Garita; Pablo Dorián	45.46	Guatemala; Edgar Álvarez; José Miguel Solórzano; Rodrigo Prahl; Edwin Morataya	46.09	Panama; Blas Osorio; Jhamal Bowen; José Deago; Víctor Acevedo	46.21
4 x 400 metres relay	Costa Rica; César Vargas; Daniel Herrera; Osvaldo Enríquez; Andrés Bermúdez	3:39.25	Panama; Jhamal Bowen; Blas Osorio; José Deago; Carlos Montero	3.43.96	Guatemala; Edwin Morataya; Rocael Sis Sical; Eduardo Castillo; Byron Hernández	3:50.94

==== Girls (U-18) ====
Event	Gold		Silver		Bronze	
100 metres (wind: +1.5 m/s)	Mardel Alvarado (PAN)	12.86	Cindy Sibaja (CRC)	12.93	Stephanie Zamora (CRC)	13.01
200 metres (wind: -0.7 m/s)	Mardel Alvarado (PAN)	27.02	Stephanie Zamora (CRC)	27.29	Yelena Alvear (PAN)	27.84
400 metres	Yelena Alvear (PAN)	1:01.08	María Fernanda Mora (CRC)	1:02.98	Caterin Ibarra (GUA)	1:03.04
800 metres	Caterin Ibarra (GUA)	2:21.25	Cony Villalobos (NCA)	2:24.78	Reina Morales (CRC)	2:26.05
1500 metres	Caterin Ibarra (GUA)	4:58.50	Cony Villalobos (NCA)	5:01.39	Meybol Rocha (NCA)	5:03.88
3000 metres	Merlin Chalí (GUA)	11:06.67 CR	Verónica Hidalgo (CRC)	12:55.55		
100 metres hurdles	Cindy Sibaja (CRC)	15.54 CR	Gabriela Monge (CRC)	15.75	Valeska Portugal (PAN)	20.61
300 metres hurdles	Gabriela Monge (CRC)	47.06	María Fernanda Mora (CRC)	49.29	Valeska Portugal (PAN)	53.39
High jump	Kashani Ríos (PAN)	1.55m	Stephanie Rodríguez (CRC)	1.46m	María Mercedes Wong (NCA)	1.43m
Long jump	Estefany Cruz (GUA)	5.12m (wind: +0.7 m/s)	Gretel Campos (CRC)	5.07m (wind: +1.2 m/s)	María Mercedes Wong (NCA)	4.58m (wind: +0.4 m/s)
Triple jump	Estefany Cruz (GUA)	11.78m (wind: +0.7 m/s) CR	Cindy Sibaja (CRC)	11.54m w (wind: +2.3 m/s)	Desireé Bermúdez (CRC)	10.75m (wind: +1.4 m/s)
Shot put	Jannis Ramírez (NCA)	10.28m	Ana Luisa Chacón (GUA)	9.10m	Raquel Rodríguez (CRC)	8.38m
Discus throw	Ana Luisa Chacón (GUA)	27.56m	Carolina Morera (CRC)	25.04m	Jannis Ramírez (NCA)	20.38m
Javelin throw	Jannis Ramírez (NCA)	35.81m	Ariana Fernández (CRC)	31.75m	Marta Bermúdez (GUA)	30.81m
Pentathlon	Pamela Jiménez (CRC)	2059pts	Nicole Carboni (CRC)	1962pts		
4 Kilometres Walk	Jamy Franco (GUA)	20:19.82 CR	Brenda Ovando (GUA)	22:29.14	Pamela Ramírez (CRC)	24:59.55
4 x 100 metres relay	Costa Rica; Gretel Campos; Pamela Jiménez; Gabriela Monge; Stephanie Zamora	51.56	Panama; Yelena Alvear; Mardel Alvarado; Kashani Ríos; Valeska Portugal	52.76	Guatemala; Estefany Cruz; Delia Catalina Aguilar; Caterin Ibarra; Adriana Morales	53.20
4 x 400 metres relay	Costa Rica; Melania Alvarado; María Fernanda Mora; Gabriela Monge; Reina Morales	4:13.45	Nicaragua; María Ángeles Escobar; Joselin Anielka Soza; Luz Amador; Cony Villalobos	4:21.39	Panama; Yelena Alvear; Kashani Ríos; Mardel Alvarado; Valeska Portugal	4:25.58

== Medal table (unofficial) ==
The medal table was published.

* Host nation (Nicaragua)

Rank	Nation	Gold	Silver	Bronze	Total
1	Costa Rica (CRC)	30	33	22	85
2	Guatemala (GUA)	21	24	19	64
3	Panama (PAN)	16	6	12	34
4	Nicaragua (NIC)*	12	16	19	47
Totals (4 entries)		79	79	72	230

== Team trophies ==
The placing table for team trophy awarded to the 1st place overall team (boys and girls categories) was published.

=== Overall ===
The host country is highlighted in lavender blue

Rank	Nation	Points
1st place, gold medalist(s)	Costa Rica	550
2	Guatemala	399
3	Nicaragua	320
4	(Panama) Panamá	237

== Participation ==
A total number of 250 athletes and officials were reported to participate in the event. Belize, El Salvador, and Honduras did not participate because of bad weather conditions caused by Hurricane Adrian. The number of athletes of some teams participating in the event was reported.

- Costa Rica
- Guatemala
- Nicaragua (52)
- (Panama) Panamá (30)
