= 2004 Central American Junior and Youth Championships in Athletics =

XVII Central American Junior and XII Central American Youth Championships in Athletics
- Dates: June 11–12
- Host city: San José, Costa Rica
- Venue: Estadio Nacional
- Level: Junior and Youth
- Events: 84 (43 boys, 41 girls)
- Participation: 279 athletes from 7 nations
- Records set: 19

The 2004 Central American Junior and Youth Championships in Athletics were held at the Estadio Nacional in San José, Costa Rica, between June 11–12, 2004. Organized by the Central American Isthmus Athletic Confederation (CADICA), it was the 17th edition of the Junior (U-20) and the 12th edition of the Youth (U-18) competition. A total of 84 events were contested, 43 by boys and 41 by girls. Overall winner on points was Costa Rica.

== Medal summary ==
Complete results can be found on the CADICA, the CACAC, and on the AthletismoCR.com webpages.

=== Junior ===
==== Boys (U-20) ====
Event	Gold		Silver		Bronze	
100 metres (wind: -1.0 m/s)	Carlos Abaunza (NCA)	10.83	Enrique Colville (CRC)	10.95	Maxwell Álvarez (GUA)	11.05
200 metres (wind: -2.3 m/s)	Josell Ramírez (CRC)	21.87	Nery Brenes (CRC)	21.91	Patrick Holwerda (GUA)	22.53
400 metres	Takeshi Fujiwara (ESA)	47.80 CR	Nery Brenes (CRC)	48.00	Patrick Holwerda (GUA)	49.40
800 metres	Francis Jiménez (ESA)	1:55.32	Roberto Arroyo (CRC)	1:55.36	Carmen Daniel Hernández (NCA)	1:56.02
1500 metres	Francis Jiménez (ESA)	4:01.77	Carmen Daniel Hernández (NCA)	4:05.40	David Vargas (CRC)	4:07.92
5000 metres	Jorge Núñez (CRC)	17:26.10	Bartolomé Sequén (GUA)	17:30.23	Rónald Pérez (ESA)	17:51.32
10000 metres	Bartolomé Sequén (GUA)	34:18.88	Rónald Pérez (ESA)	34:53.18	Carlos Fernández (CRC)	37:17.98
3000 metres steeplechase	Jorge Núñez (CRC)	9:58.18	Marlon Monterrosa (ESA)	9:58.24	Marco Antonio Dubón (GUA)	10:23.20
110 metres hurdles (wind: +0.4 m/s)	David Umaña (CRC)	15.47	Yehefri Benjamín Vides (ESA)	15.84	Luis Carlos Gómez (GUA)	15.85
400 metres hurdles	David Umaña (CRC)	54.38	Camilo Quevedo (GUA)	54.76	Juan Caneses (ESA)	55.88
High jump	Anselmo Delgado (PAN)	1.87 m	Delmi Merino (HON)	1.81 m	Herman Blease (BIZ)	1.78 m
Pole vault	Marcos Josué Mira (ESA)	4.20 m =CR	Hermann Domínguez (GUA)	4.10 m	Luis Alberto Díaz (ESA)	3.60 m
Long jump	Maxwell Álvarez (GUA)	6.94 m	Henry Linton (CRC)	6.71 m	Marcos Gutiérrez (CRC)	6.41 m
Triple jump	Maxwell Álvarez (GUA)	14.89 m CR	Henry Linton (CRC)	14.28 m	Yehefri Benjamín Vides (ESA)	14.23 m
Shot put	Ovidio Estrada (GUA)	13.52 m CR	Roberto Sawyers (CRC)	13.50 m	Daniel Flores (HON)	12.25 m
Discus throw	Juan Carlos Silva (GUA)	40.61 m CR	Andrés Sanabria (CRC)	40.33 m	Juan Enrique Galdámez (ESA)	36.62 m
Hammer throw	Roberto Sawyers (CRC)	47.82 m	Andrés Sanabria (CRC)	42.97 m	José Barcos (GUA)	40.00 m
Javelin throw	Kenley Olivos (NCA)	57.65 m CR	Cristian Díaz (PAN)	48.35 m	Adrián Zepeda (NCA)	48.03 m
Decathlon	Darwin Colón (HON)	5086 pts	Walter Mauricio Payés (ESA)	5009 pts	Adrián Barrantes (CRC)	4051 pts
10,000 metres Walk	Pablo Vargas (CRC)	51:54.70	José Roberto Benavides (ESA)	53:38.28	Warren León (CRC)	54:07.31
4 x 100 metres relay	Costa Rica	42.35	Guatemala	43.17	Nicaragua; Carlos Abaunza; Ramiro Sandoval; Julio Guzmán; Miguel Angel Quezada	44.68
4 x 400 metres relay	Guatemala; Hans Villagrán; Patrick Holwerda; Camilo Quevedo; Allan Ayala	3:20.78 CR	El Salvador	3:22.41	Nicaragua	3:29.98

==== Girls (U-20) ====
Event	Gold		Silver		Bronze	
100 metres (wind: -1.9 m/s)	Kaina Arzu (BIZ)	12.60	Tracy Joseph (CRC)	12.70	Jeimy Bernárdez (HON)	12.82
200 metres (wind: -2.6 m/s)	Kaina Arzu (BIZ)	26.11	Tracy Joseph (CRC)	26.22	Tamara Quintanilla (ESA)	27.09
400 metres	Tamara Quintanilla (ESA)	59.37	Raquel Barquero (CRC)	59.57	María Gabriela Espinoza (CRC)	59.83
800 metres	Raquel Barquero (CRC)	2:19.67	Reina Obando (NCA)	2:22.10	Liliana Mora (CRC)	2:26.91
1500 metres	Reina Obando (NCA)	4:57.61	Andrea Ferris (PAN)	5:02.59	Viviana Acuña (CRC)	6:02.62
5000 metres	Xiomara Rivera (ESA)	19:17.70	Andrea Ferris (PAN)	19:31.63	Delbin Evelyn Solís (ESA)	19:45.63
10000 metres	Xiomara Rivera (ESA)	41:56.55	Delbin Evelyn Solí (ESA)	42:28.49	Verónica Vargas (CRC)	43:16.72
100 metres hurdles (wind: -1.4 m/s)	Mitchelle Zúñiga (GUA)	15.32	Jeimy Bernárdez (HON)	15.69	Farina Murillo (CRC)	16.17
400 metres hurdles	Marcela González (CRC)	1:05.84	Farina Murillo (CRC)	1:07.37	Delia Pamela Cordero (GUA)	1:09.78
High jump	Kay-de Vaughn (BIZ)	1.66 m CR	Alejandra Gómez (CRC)	1.59 m	Ana Lisbeth Castillo (GUA); Alejandra Lobo (CRC)	1.45 m
Pole vault	María Rodas (GUA)	2.75 m	Clarencia Jones (BIZ)	2.60 m	Kay-de Vaughn (BIZ)	2.55 m
Long jump	Ginna von Quednow (GUA)	5.29 m	Sharon Ruiz (CRC)	5.19 m	Carmen Liliana Reyes (ESA)	4.99 m
Triple jump	Brenda Blanco (GUA)	11.58 m (wind: +1.1 m/s) CR	Sharon Ruiz (CRC)	11.42 m (wind: +1.1 m/s)	Aleen Mendoza (BIZ)	11.37 m (wind: +0.4 m/s)
Shot put	Silvia Piñar (CRC)	10.42 m	Diana Gourzong (CRC)	9.42 m	Ana Carolina Granados (ESA)	8.45 m
Discus throw	Silvia Piñar (CRC)	37.57 m CR	Viviana Abarca (CRC)	35.10 m		
Hammer throw	Silvia Piñar (CRC)	43.06 m	Viviana Abarca (CRC)	39.22 m	Ana Carolina Granados (ESA)	34.20 m
Javelin throw	Franchesca López (CRC)	25.07 m	Ivonne Quesada (CRC)	22.03 m		
Heptathlon	Jennifer Ovares (CRC)	3596 pts	Ginna von Quednow (GUA)	3571 pts		
5000 metres Walk	Verónica Colindres (ESA)	26:34.07	Susan Chong (PAN)	28:36.05	Karla Cruz (CRC)	29:02.40
4 x 100 metres relay	Costa Rica	49.55	Guatemala	50.31	Belize	50.44
4 x 400 metres relay	Costa Rica	4:02.94 CR	Guatemala	4:14.05	Nicaragua	4:16.67

=== Youth ===
==== Boys (U-18) ====
Event	Gold		Silver		Bronze	
100 metres (wind: +0.8 m/s)	Ernesto Hidalgo (CRC)	11.83	José Daniel Garita (CRC)	12.03	José Deago (PAN)	12.04
200 metres (wind: -2.8 m/s)	Ernesto Hidalgo (CRC)	24.45	Sebastián Bacaró (ESA)	24.79	José Deago (PAN)	25.16
400 metres	Greivin González (CRC)	50.70	Miguel Paz (GUA)	52.26	Oscar Hernández (CRC)	53.64
800 metres	Greivin González (CRC)	1:57.47 CR	Oscar Hernández (CRC)	2:01.35		
1500 metres	Greivin González (CRC)	4:12.14	Edrey García (CRC)	4:44.58		
3000 metres	Kevin Montoya (CRC)	9:57.68	Juan Lazo (NCA)	10:05.98	Juan Diego Vargas (CRC)	10:19.56
2000 metres steeplechase	Oscar Hernández (CRC)	6:59.74	Edrey García (CRC)	7:10.78	Juan Lazo (NCA)	7:16.97
110 metres hurdles (wind: m/s)	Alejandro Olmedo (ESA)	14.33	Daniel Montero (CRC)	15.10	Miguel Paz (GUA)	15.14
400 metres hurdles	Miguel Paz (GUA)	57.48	Davis Muñoz (CRC)	58.21	Arnoldo Monge (CRC)	59.53
High jump	Alejandro Olmedo (ESA)	1.86 m	Ricardo Iraheta (ESA)	1.79 m	Sherston O'Brien (BIZ)	1.76 m
Pole vault	Edwin Barrientos (GUA)	4.00 m CR	Ricardo González (HON)	3.25 m	Bryan Josué García (ESA)	3.15 m
Long jump	Sherston O'Brien (BIZ)	6.21 m w (wind: +2.2 m/s)	Marvin García (GUA)	6.12 m (wind: +1.6 m/s)	Norman Morales (NCA)	6.05 m (wind: +1.6 m/s)
Triple jump	Marvin García (GUA)	13.66 m	Sherston O'Brien (BIZ)	12.89 m	Melvin Pérez (PAN)	12.44 m
Shot put	Juan Carlos De León (ESA)	13.35 m	Emanuel Álvarez (CRC)	13.20 m	Jairo Jiménez (NCA)	11.72 m
Discus throw	Emanuel Álvarez (CRC)	36.79 m	Alex Evans (BIZ)	33.80 m	Edgar Florian (GUA)	31.88 m
Hammer throw	Edgar Florian (GUA)	45.59 m	Rodrigo Barahona (ESA)	30.66 m	Emanuel Álvarez (CRC)	28.87 m
Javelin throw	Erasmo José Ramírez (NCA)	49.04 m	Nelson Zúñiga (NCA)	45.39 m	Wolfgang Werner (CRC)	43.89 m
Octathlon	Alex Evans (BIZ)	3865 pts	Edwin Campos (CRC)	3637 pts	Oscar Vásquez (ESA)	3601 pts
5000 metres Walk	Yassir Cabrera (PAN)	23:55.95	Víctor Hugo Mendoza (ESA)	24:06.00	Kevin Montoya (CRC)	25:58.84
4 x 100 metres relay	El Salvador	45.86	Guatemala	46.14	Costa Rica	47.16
4 x 400 metres relay	Costa Rica	3:33.83	El Salvador	3:37.10		

==== Girls (U-18) ====
Event	Gold		Silver		Bronze	
100 metres (wind: -1.9 m/s)	Consuelo Esperanza Vásquez (ESA)	12.74	Mirtha Martínez (HON)	12.92	Shiffana Flowers (BIZ)	13.01
200 metres (wind: +0.9 m/s)	Consuelo Esperanza Vásquez (ESA)	26.25	Stephanie Zamora (CRC)	27.29	Shiffana Flowers (BIZ)	27.52
400 metres	Karen Arce (CRC)	1:00.65	María Fernanda Mora (CRC)	1:02.04	Belén Corrales (NCA)	1:02.18
800 metres	Karen Arce (CRC)	2:15.89 CR	Caterin Ibarra (GUA)	2:21.38	Susana Rodríguez (ESA)	2:27.49
1500 metres	Karen Arce (CRC)	5:06.16	Caterin Ibarra (GUA)	5:09.34	Susana Rodríguez (ESA)	5:11.45
3000 metres	Caterin Ibarra (GUA)	10:48.63 CR	Nataly Hernández (ESA)	11:04.59	Blanca Solís (ESA)	11:18.15
100 metres hurdles (wind: -0.8 m/s)	Cindy Sibaja (CRC)	16.46	Dilcia Lucía Cruz (ESA)	16.47	María Fernanda Mora (CRC)	16.50
300 metres hurdles	María Fernanda Mora (CRC)	48.47	Beatriz Willink (CRC)	48.63	Dilcia Lucía Cruz (ESA)	49.50
High jump	Patricia Montes (ESA)	1.58 m	Marcela Blandón (ESA)	1.55 m	Sandra Rodríguez (GUA)	1.46 m
Pole vault	Gladys Yesenia Quijada (ESA)	2.55 m CR	Vera Domínguez (GUA)	2.40 m	Wendy Vargas (CRC)	2.35 m
Long jump	Estefany Cruz (GUA)	5.13 m	Aileen Araya (CRC)	5.09 m	Gladys Yesenia Quijada (ESA)	4.99 m
Triple jump	Estefany Cruz (GUA)	11.46 m (wind: +1.8 m/s) CR	Shiffana Flowers (BIZ)	11.18 m w (wind: +3.7 m/s)	Desiré Bermúdez (CRC)	10.75 m (wind: +2.0 m/s)
Shot put	Aixa Middleton (PAN)	10.07 m	Kandice Vaughn (BIZ)	9.95 m	Tamara Núñez (BIZ)	9.40 m
Discus throw	Aixa Middleton (PAN)	38.20 m CR	Yahaira Ellington (GUA)	29.09 m	Kandice Vaughn (BIZ)	27.49 m
Hammer throw	Yahaira Ellington (GUA)	25.91 m	Aixa Middleton (PAN)	24.03 m	Celene Mendoza (HON)	22.74 m
Javelin throw	Jannis Ramírez (NCA)	47.64 m CR	Ariana Fernández (CRC)	28.31 m	Elizabeth Sánchez (PAN)	25.68 m
Pentathlon	Jénnifer Henríquez (ESA)	2303 pts	Eimy Bolaños (CRC)	2055 pts	Wendy Vargas (CRC)	1942 pts
4000 metres Walk	Carolyn Hernández (CRC)	21:28.21	Mayra Carolina Pérez (GUA)	22:28.18	Ileana Ocampo (CRC)	24:00.22
4 x 100 metres relay	Costa Rica	51.35	El Salvador	51.50		
4 x 400 metres relay	El Salvador	4:10.69	Costa Rica	4:11.48		

== Medal table ==
The medal table was published.

* Host nation (Costa Rica)

Rank	Nation	Gold	Silver	Bronze	Total
1	Costa Rica (CRC)*	30	32	24	86
2	El Salvador (ESA)	18	16	17	51
3	Guatemala (GUA)	18	15	11	44
4	Belize (BIZ)	5	5	9	19
5	Nicaragua (NIC)	5	4	9	18
6	Panama (PAN)	4	5	4	13
7	Honduras (HON)	1	4	3	8
Totals (7 entries)		81	81	77	239

== Team trophies ==
The placing table for team trophy awarded to the 1st place overall team (boys and girls categories) was published.

=== Overall ===
The host country is highlighted in lavender blue

Rank	Nation	Points
1st place, gold medalist(s)	Costa Rica	573
2	El Salvador	329
3	Guatemala	279
4	Nicaragua	126
5	Belize	110
6	(Panama) Panamá	103
7	Honduras	72

== Participation ==
A total number of 279 athletes and officials were reported to participate in the event.

- Belize (17)
- Costa Rica (95)
- El Salvador (46)
- Guatemala (36)
- Honduras (14)
- Nicaragua (37)
- (Panama) Panamá (34)
