= 2003 Central American Junior and Youth Championships in Athletics =

XVI Central American Junior and XI Central American Youth Championships in Athletics
- Dates: September 4–6
- Host city: San José, Costa Rica
- Venue: Estadio Nacional
- Level: Junior and Youth
- Events: 83 (43 boys, 40 girls)
- Participation: 301 athletes from 7 nations
- Records set: 19

The 2003 Central American Junior and Youth Championships in Athletics were held at the Estadio Nacional in San José, Costa Rica, between September 4–6, 2003. Organized by the Central American Isthmus Athletic Confederation (CADICA), it was the 16th edition of the Junior (U-20) and the 11th edition of the Youth (U-18) competition. A total of 83 events were contested, 43 by boys and 40 by girls. The championship was held jointly with the IX Central American U-14 and U-12 Age Group Championship (Campeonato Centroamericano Infantil). Overall winner on points was Costa Rica.

== Medal summary ==
Complete results can be found on the CACAC and on the AthletismoCR webpage.

=== Junior ===
==== Boys (U-20) ====
Event	Gold		Silver		Bronze	
100 metres	Jorge Luis Solórzano (GUA)	10.69	Carlos Abaunza (NCA)	10.92	Emanuel Chanto (CRC)	11.44
200 metres	Jorge Luis Solórzano (GUA)	21.48 CR	Andrés Rodríguez (PAN)	21.99	Carlos Abaunza (NCA)	22.35
400 metres	Andrés Rodríguez (PAN)	48.67	Takeshi Fujiwara (ESA)	49.13	Francisco Guerra (NCA)	50.64
800 metres	Roberto Arroyo (CRC)	1:54.52 CR	Francis Jiménez (ESA)	1:55.83	Carmen Daniel Hernández (NCA)	1:56.59
1500 metres	Salvador Francisco Romero (ESA)	4:04.46	Francis Jiménez (ESA)	4:05.34	Carmen Daniel Hernández (NCA)	4:06.11
5000 metres	Salvador Francisco Romero (ESA)	16:32.61	Federico Vargas (CRC)	16:33.66	Rónald Pérez (ESA)	16:53.61
10000 metres	Rónald Pérez (ESA)	34:59.17	Cristian Araya (CRC)	35:01.57	Gabriel Vargas (CRC)	37:20.56
3000 metres steeplechase	Salvador Francisco Romero (ESA)	10:09.09	Federico Vargas (CRC)	10:22.18	Rónald Pérez (ESA)	10:25.00
110 metres hurdles (wind: m/s)	Edgar Esquina (PAN)	15.61 CR	Hugo González (CRC)	17.08	Juan Chavarría (CRC)	17.18
400 metres hurdles	David Umaña (CRC)	55.22	Edgar Esquina (PAN)	55.34	Allan Ayala (GUA)	56.88
High jump	Henry Linton (CRC)	1.90 m	Anselmo Delgado (PAN)	1.85 m	Byron Nolberto (GUA)	1.85 m
Pole vault	Miguel Campollo (GUA)	3.90 m	Anthony García (CRC)	3.30 m		
Long jump	Maxwell Álvarez (GUA)	6.65 m (wind: +1.2 m/s)	Jonathan Romero (PAN)	6.58 m (wind: +1.6 m/s)	Marcos Gutiérrez (CRC)	6.34 m (wind: -2.0 m/s)
Triple jump	Maxwell Álvarez (GUA)	14.56 m CR	Byron Nolberto (GUA)	14.08 m	Henry Linton (CRC)	14.00 m
Shot put	Roberto Sawyers (CRC)	12.86 m	Jorge Castro (GUA)	12.07 m	Diego Berríos (GUA)	11.94 m
Discus throw	Jorge Castro (GUA)	38.85 m	Andrés Sanabria (CRC)	37.71 m	Michael González (PAN)	36.29 m
Hammer Throw	Diego Berríos (GUA)	46.17 m	Roberto Sawyers (CRC)	46.12 m	Pablo Aguirre (CRC)	31.78 m
Javelin throw	Iván Torres (ESA)	52.70 m	Luis Ernesto Aquino (ESA)	44.84 m	Ronald Beneth (HON)	41.26 m
Decathlon	Yehefri Benjamín Vides (ESA)	5179 pts	Anthony García (CRC)	4613 pts	Reinel Núñez (CRC)	3763 pts
10,000 metres Walk	Salvador Ernesto Mira (ESA)	47:12.64	Marco Antonio Benavides (ESA)	49:11.19	Juan Araya (CRC)	57:46.75
4 x 100 metres relay	Guatemala	42.58	Panama	43.31	Costa Rica	43.53
4 x 400 metres relay	El Salvador; Takeshi Fujiwara; Francis Jiménez; Salvador Francisco Romero; Walter Mauricio Payés	3:24.49	Guatemala	3:25.01	Nicaragua	3:27.34

==== Girls (U-20) ====
Event	Gold		Silver		Bronze	
100 metres	Adasa Padmore (PAN)	12.32	Kaina Martínez (BIZ)	12.92	Ana Griselda Reyes (ESA)	13.07
200 metres	Adasa Padmore (PAN)	25.77	Amada Martínez (ESA)	26.05	Ana Griselda Reyes (ESA)	26.43
400 metres	Raquel Barquero (CRC)	59.87	Amada Martínez (ESA)	1:00.14	Melissa Moraga (CRC)	1:01.12
800 metres	Raquel Barquero (CRC)	2:18.30 CR	Reyna Obando (NCA)	2:18.84	Marjorie Ponce (NCA)	2:21.62
1500 metres	Reyna Obando (NCA)	4:49.42 CR	Marjorie Ponce (NCA)	5:05.43	Karen Escobar (GUA)	5:12.63
5000 metres	Xiomara Rivera (ESA)	20:12.05	Delbin Evelyn Solís (ESA)	20:30.92	María Ferris (PAN)	20:39.27
10000 metres	Xiomara Rivera (ESA)	43:41.20	Delbin Evelyn Solís (ESA)	45:15.98	Lindsay Serrano (CRC)	47:51.93
100 metres hurdles	María Gabriela Carrillo (ESA)	15.72	Mitchelle Zúñiga (GUA)	15.74	María Farina Murillo (CRC)	15.95
400 metres hurdles	Ana Marcela González (CRC)	1:04.72	María Gabriela Espinoza (CRC)	1:08.76	Fátima Gabriela Flores (ESA)	1:10.82
High jump	María Gabriela Carrillo (ESA)	1.58 m	Alejandra Gómez (CRC)	1.55 m		
Pole vault	Clarencia Jones (BIZ)	2.60 m	Jaqueline Vargas (CRC)	2.50 m		
Long jump	María Gabriela Carrillo (ESA)	5.46 m	Adasa Padmore (PAN)	5.39 m	Alejandra Gómez (CRC)	5.17 m
Triple jump	Clarencia Jones (BIZ)	11.39 m	Rishlane Maitland (CRC)	11.02 m	Kay-De Vaughn (BIZ)	10.93 m
Shot put	Nathyan Catano (PAN)	11.94 m CR	Doroty López (GUA)	10.87 m	Dalila Rugama (NCA)	10.47 m
Discus throw	Silvia Piñar (CRC)	37.13 m	Doroty López (GUA)	36.34 m	Karen Álvarez (NCA)	28.10 m
Hammer Throw	Silvia Piñar (CRC)	37.25 m	Andrea Briceño (CRC)	32.22 m	Doroty López (GUA)	29.97 m
Javelin throw	Dalila Rugama (NCA)	48.05 m CR	Ginna von Quednow (GUA)	38.42 m	Mónica Jones (GUA)	36.16 m
5000 metres Walk	Mirna Ortíz (GUA)	26:56.06	Verónica Colindres (ESA)	26:59.28	María Amalia Reynolds (CRC)	27:28.00
4 x 100 metres relay	El Salvador	50.45	Costa Rica; Raquel Barquero; Pamela Cuzi; Melissa Moraga; Farina Murillo	50.79	Guatemala	51.29
4 x 400 metres relay	Costa Rica; Raquel Barquero; Melissa Moraga; Pamela Cuzi; Ana Marcela González	4:04.25	El Salvador	4:11.61	Nicaragua	4:18.21

=== Youth ===
==== Boys (U-18) ====
Event	Gold		Silver		Bronze	
100 metres	Andrés Leonel Rodríguez (PAN)	11.06 CR	Josell Ramírez (CRC)	11.11	Luis Alonso Reyes (ESA)	11.30
200 metres	Luis Alonso Reyes (ESA)	22.92	Francisco Castellanos (GUA)	23.72	Sélvin Álvarez (HON)	23.99
400 metres	Mario Nelson Mendoza (ESA)	52.89	Héctor Daley Jr. (PAN)	53.21	Oscar Hernández (CRC)	53.43
800 metres	Greivin González (CRC)	1:59.37	Oscar Hernández (CRC)	2:01.81	Francisco López (ESA)	2:02.26
1500 metres	Greivin González (CRC)	4:16.42	Eyer Álvarez (GUA)	4:16.45	Róger Jaén (PAN)	4:17.45
3000 metres	Greivin González (CRC)	9:21.93	Marlon Monterrosa (ESA)	9:22.08	Jairo Sánchez (GUA)	9:27.92
2000 metres steeplechase	Marlon Monterrosa (ESA)	6:22.80 CR	Héber Álvarez (GUA)	6:35.77	Róger Jaén (PAN)	6:51.41
100 metres hurdles	Alejandro Olmedo (ESA)	14.39	Daniel Montero (CRC)	14.95	Marvin García (GUA)	15.61
400 metres hurdles	Miguel Paz (GUA)	1:00.48	Christian Pérez (ESA)	1:00.87	Luis Ricardo Lazo (ESA)	1:00.96
High jump	Alejandro Olmedo (ESA)	1.91 m CR	Víctor Méndez (CRC)	1.80 m	Kenneth Arauz (CRC); Edwin Barrientos (GUA)	1.71 m
Pole vault	Luis Alberto Díaz (ESA)	3.60 m	José Gómez (CRC)	2.50 m	Edwin Campos (CRC)	2.40 m
Long jump	Josell Ramírez (CRC)	6.65 m CR	Alejandro Olmedo (ESA)	5.90 m	Bryan Linton (CRC)	5.86 m
Triple jump	Josell Ramírez (CRC)	13.88 m CR	Marvin García (GUA)	13.00 m	Charles Paulino (BIZ)	12.53 m
Shot put	Daniel Flores (HON)	12.76 m	Emanuel Álvarez (CRC)	12.64 m	Marvin Jiménez (GUA)	12.31 m
Discus throw	Emanuel Álvarez (CRC)	34.96 m	Marvin Jiménez (GUA)	33.58 m	José Barco (GUA)	30.97 m
Hammer Throw	José Barco (GUA)	40.87 m	Adrián Quesada (CRC)	30.29 m	Marvin Jiménez (GUA)	30.12 m
Javelin throw	Adrián Zepeda (NCA)	42.56 m	Mauricio Pérez (NCA)	40.69 m	José Barco (GUA)	34.12 m
Octathlon	José Randall Arias (CRC)	3275 pts	Alex Evans (BIZ)	3173 pts	Oscar Vásquez (ESA)	3058 pts
5000 metres Walk	José Roberto Benavides (ESA)	25:02.70	Giancarlo Burrión (GUA)	25:04.84	Kevin Montoya (CRC)	25:15.49
4 x 100 metres relay	El Salvador; Alejandro Olmedo; Raúl Enrique Pleitez; Luis Alonso Reyes; Luis Ricardo Lazo	44.44 CR	Guatemala	47.63	Honduras	49.67
4 x 400 metres relay	Costa Rica	3:37.21	El Salvador	3:37.45	Guatemala	3:42.45

==== Girls (U-18) ====
Event	Gold		Silver		Bronze	
100 metres	Consuelo Esperanza Vásquez (ESA)	12.84	Mirtha Martínez (HON)	12.90	Daphne Hernández (GUA)	13.00
200 metres	Consuelo Esperanza Vásquez (ESA)	26.51	Tamara Quintanilla (ESA)	26.88	Daphne Hernández (GUA)	26.89
400 metres	Tamara Quintanilla (ESA)	59.94	Isabel Restrepo (PAN)	1:00.45	Jhasmeiry Arrieta (PAN)	1:01.66
800 metres	Catherine Lemus (GUA)	2:23.36	Raquel Henríquez (ESA)	2:24.21	María Fernanda Mora (CRC)	2:24.35
1500 metres	Catherine Lemus (GUA)	5:02.59	Regina Méndez (ESA)	5:04.10	Andrea Ferris (PAN)	5:10.44
3000 metres	Andrea Ferris (PAN)	11:17.51 CR	Aura Ordóñez (GUA)	11:18.96	Ana Cecilia Ibarra (NCA)	11:29.75
100 metres hurdles (wind: m/s)	Nazareth Chong (PAN)	15.92 CR	Aileen Araya (CRC)	16.17	Angélica Hidalgo (CRC)	16.26
300 metres hurdles	Isabel Restrepo (PAN)	47.28	Beatriz Willink (CRC)	48.09	Delia Pamela Cordero (GUA)	48.52
High jump	Gabriela Barquero (CRC)	1.45 m	Jennifer Ovares (CRC)	1.45 m	Patricia Vanessa Montes (ESA)	1.40 m
Pole vault	Tatiana Domínguez (GUA)	2.40 m =CR	Gladys Yesenia Quijada (ESA)	2.30 m	María José Rodas (GUA)	2.30 m
Long jump	Gretel Campos (CRC)	5.15 m	Beatriz Willink (CRC)	4.94 m	Delia Pamela Cordero (GUA)	4.73 m
Triple jump	Sharon Ruiz (CRC)	11.00 m	Mariela Rodríguez (CRC)	10.71 m	Patricia Vanessa Montes (ESA)	10.68 m
Shot put	Aixa Middleton (PAN)	10.81 m	Kandice Vaughn (BIZ)	9.84 m	Tanisha James (BIZ)	9.60 m
Discus throw	Aixa Middleton (PAN)	37.92 m CR	Viviana Abarca (CRC)	26.99 m	Yahaira Ellington (GUA)	23.83 m
Hammer Throw	Viviana Abarca (CRC)	34.74 m	Silvia Pérez (CRC)	24.69 m	Yahaira Ellington (GUA)	21.80 m
Javelin throw	Jannis Ramírez (NCA)	41.26 m CR	Ana Carolina Durán (CRC)	24.80 m	Ariana Fernández (CRC)	21.56 m
Pentathlon	Jennifer Ovares (CRC)	2765 pts	María Fernanda Mora (CRC)	2743 pts	Karina Henríquez (ESA)	2431 pts
4000 metres Walk	Mayra Carolina Pérez (GUA)	21:15.40	Carolyn Hernández (CRC)	21:21.15	Susana Chong (PAN)	21:24.84
4 x 100 metres relay	Costa Rica; Gretel Campos; Angélica Hidalgo; Sharon Ruiz; Beatriz Willink	51.20	El Salvador	51.64	Panama	52.26
4 x 400 metres relay	El Salvador	4:13.63	Panama	4:17.71	Guatemala	4:18.19

== Medal table (unofficial) ==
The medal table published include the U-14 and U-12 categories of the Age Group Championship. The medal table below shows an unofficial medal count for the Junior and Youth categories only.

* Host nation (Costa Rica)

Rank	Nation	Gold	Silver	Bronze	Total
1	El Salvador (ESA)	26	20	12	58
2	Costa Rica (CRC)*	24	31	22	77
3	Guatemala (GUA)	15	15	23	53
4	Panama (PAN)	11	9	8	28
5	Nicaragua (NIC)	4	4	10	18
6	Belize (BIZ)	2	3	3	8
7	Honduras (HON)	1	1	3	5
Totals (7 entries)		83	83	81	247

== Team trophies ==
The placing table for team trophy awarded to the 1st place overall team (boys and girls, including the U-14 and U-12 categories of the Age Group Championship) was published.

=== Overall ===
The host country is highlighted in lavender blue

Rank	Nation	Points
1st place, gold medalist(s)	Costa Rica	738
2	El Salvador	534
3	Guatemala	407
4	(Panama) Panamá	318
5	Belize	168
6	Nicaragua	137
7	Honduras	56

== Participation ==
A total number of 503 athletes (including U-14 and U-12) was reported to participate in the event. An unofficial count results in 301 athletes participating in the Junior and Youth categories. The numbers in brackets refer to (published total no. of athletes/unofficial count of U-20 and U-18).

- Belize (43/20)
- Costa Rica (136/92)
- El Salvador (86/46)
- Guatemala (63/41)
- Honduras (41/20)
- Nicaragua (56/38)
- (Panama) Panamá (78/44)
