= Andrea Ferris =

Panamanian middle-distance runner

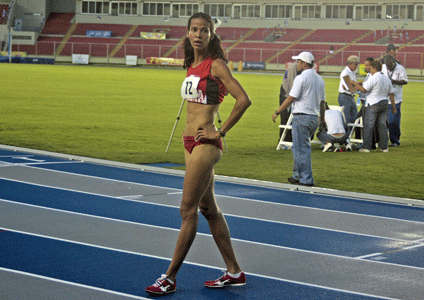
- Ferris in 2011

Personal information
- Full name: Andrea María Ferris Quintero
- Born: 21 September 1987 (age 38) La Chorrera, Panamá Province, Panama
- Height: 1.82 m (6 ft 0 in)
- Weight: 62 kg (137 lb)

Sport
- Country: Panama
- Sport: Women's Athletics
- Event: Middle-distance running
Medal record
Women's athletics
Representing Panama
Ibero-American Championships
Gold medal – first place	2010 San Fernando	800 m
Silver medal – second place	2012 Barquisimeto	1500 m
South American Championships
Silver medal – second place	2011 Buenos Aires	800 m
Central American and Caribbean Games
Silver medal – second place	2010 Mayagüez	800 m
Central American Games
Gold medal – first place	2010 Panama City	800 m
Gold medal – first place	2010 Panama City	1500 m
Gold medal – first place	2010 Panama City	3000 m steeplechase
Gold medal – first place	2010 Panama City	4x400 m relay
Gold medal – first place	2013 San José	800 m
Gold medal – first place	2013 San José	1500 m
Silver medal – second place	2013 San José	4x400 m relay
Central American Championships
Gold medal – first place	2007 San José	1500 m
Gold medal – first place	2010 Guatemala City	400 m
Gold medal – first place	2010 Guatemala City	800 m
Gold medal – first place	2010 Guatemala City	1500 m
Gold medal – first place	2010 Guatemala City	4x400 m relay
Gold medal – first place	2011 San José	800 m
Gold medal – first place	2011 San José	1500 m
Gold medal – first place	2012 Managua	400 m
Gold medal – first place	2012 Managua	800 m
Gold medal – first place	2012 Managua	1500 m
Silver medal – second place	2011 San José	400 m
Silver medal – second place	2011 San José	4x400 m relay
Bronze medal – third place	2004 Managua	1500 m
Bronze medal – third place	2007 San José	800 m
Bronze medal – third place	2007 San José	4x400 m relay
Bronze medal – third place	2012 Managua	4x400 m relay
South American Under-23 Championships
Bronze medal – third place	2008 Lima	1500 m
- Updated on 14 July 2014

Andrea Ferris (born 21 September 1987) is a Panamanian middle-distance runner. At the 2012 Summer Olympics, she competed in the Women's 800 metres.

In December 2012, she married Peruvian middle-distance runner Mario Bazán.

== Personal bests ==
- 400 m: 54.73 – Guatemala City, Guatemala, 18 September 2010
- 800 m: 2:01.63 – Ponce, Puerto Rico, 12 May 2012
- 1500 m: 4:15.22– Trujillo, Peru, 26 November 2013
- 3000 m: 9:45.00 – Uberlândia, Brazil, 26 May 2010
- 3000 m steeplechase: 10:03.21– Trujillo, Peru, 28 November 2013

== Achievements ==
Year	Competition	Venue	Position	Event	Notes
Representing Panama
2002	Central American Championships	San José, Costa Rica	5th	5000 m	20:10.02
2003	Central American Youth Championships	San José, Costa Rica	3rd	1500 m	5:10.44
2003	Central American Youth Championships	San José, Costa Rica	1st	3000 m	11:17.51
2004	Central American Junior Championships	San José, Costa Rica	2nd	1500 m	5:02.59
2004	Central American Junior Championships	San José, Costa Rica	1st	5000 m	19:31.63
2004	Central American Championships	Managua, Nicaragua	3rd	1500 m	4:58.27
2004	Central American Championships	Managua, Nicaragua	5th	5000 m	20:10.02
2004	Central American Championships	Managua, Nicaragua	—	10,000 m	DNF
2004	Central American Championships	Managua, Nicaragua	4th	4 × 400 m relay	4:29.51
2005	Central American Junior Championships	Managua, Nicaragua	1st	1500 m	4:56.70
2005	Central American Junior Championships	Managua, Nicaragua	1st	5000 m	19:00.40
2005	Central American Junior Championships	Managua, Nicaragua	1st	10,000 m	41:31.53
2005	Central American Championships	San José, Costa Rica	4th	1500 m	4:51.49
2005	Central American Championships	San José, Costa Rica	5th	5000 m	19:32.98
2005	Central American Championships	San José, Costa Rica	5th	10,000 m	40:42.53
2005	South American Junior Championships	Rosario, Argentina	9th	1500 m	4:59.90
2005	South American Junior Championships	Rosario, Argentina	7th	5000 m	19:31.43
2006	Central American Junior Championships	Guatemala City, Guatemala	1st	1500 m	5:00.48
2006	Central American Junior Championships	Guatemala City, Guatemala	4th	3000 m	11:32.76
2006	Central American Junior Championships	Guatemala City, Guatemala	1st	5000 m	19:26.34
2006	South American Championships	Tunja, Colombia	4th	800 m	2:27.49
2006	South American Championships	Tunja, Colombia	–	1500 m	DNF
2007	Central American Championships	San José, Costa Rica	3rd	800 m	2:14.20
2007	Central American Championships	San José, Costa Rica	1st	1500 m	4:41.79
2007	Central American Championships	San José, Costa Rica	3rd	4 × 400 m relay	4:00.92
2008	Ibero-American Championships	Iquique, Chile	10th (h)	800 m	2:11.59
2008	Ibero-American Championships	Iquique, Chile	8th	1500 m	4:33.44
2008	Ibero-American Championships	Iquique, Chile	6th	3000 m	10:07.84
2008	South American U23 Championships	Lima, Peru	4th	800m	2:09.66
2008	South American U23 Championships	Lima, Peru	3rd	1500m	4:36.61
2009	South American Championships	Lima, Peru	4th	800 m	2:07.33
2009	South American Championships	Lima, Peru	4th	1500 m	4:24.14
2010	Central American Games	Panama City, Panama	1st	800 m	2:02.52 GR
2010	Central American Games	Panama City, Panama	1st	1500 m	4:18.38 GR
2010	Central American Games	Panama City, Panama	1st	3000 m s'chase	10:13.20 GR
2010	Central American Games	Panama City, Panama	1st	4 × 400 m relay	3:50.53
2010	Central American and Caribbean Games	Mayagüez, Puerto Rico	2nd	800 m	2:04.16
2010	Central American and Caribbean Games	Mayagüez, Puerto Rico	5th	1500 m	4:25.21
2010	Ibero-American Championships	San Fernando, Spain	1st	800 m	2:02.86
2010	Central American Championships	Guatemala City, Guatemala	1st	400 m	54.73 CR
2010	Central American Championships	Guatemala City, Guatemala	1st	800 m	2:08.78 CR
2010	Central American Championships	Guatemala City, Guatemala	1st	1500 m	4:37.18
2010	Central American Championships	Guatemala City, Guatemala	1st	4 × 400 m relay	4:01.72
2011	South American Championships	Buenos Aires, Argentina	2nd	800 m	2:05.13
2011	Central American Championships	San José, Costa Rica	2nd	400 m	55.83
2011	Central American Championships	San José, Costa Rica	1st	800 m	2:10.88
2011	Central American Championships	San José, Costa Rica	1st	1500 m	4:40.29
2011	Central American Championships	San José, Costa Rica	2nd	4 × 400 m relay	3:56.95
2012	South American Cross Country Championships	Lima, Peru	11th	8 km	30:52.3
2012	Central American Championships	Managua, Nicaragua	1st	400 m	55.17
2012	Central American Championships	Managua, Nicaragua	1st	800 m	2.03.91 CR
2012	Central American Championships	Managua, Nicaragua	1st	1500 m	4.20.00 CR
2012	Central American Championships	Managua, Nicaragua	3rd	4 × 400 m relay	4.00.99
2012	Ibero-American Championships	Barquisimeto, Venezuela	6th	800 m	2:06.18
2012	Ibero-American Championships	Barquisimeto, Venezuela	2nd	1500 m	4:20.50
2012	Olympic Games	London, United Kingdom	20th (h)	800 m	2:05.59
2013	Central American Games	San José, Costa Rica	4th	400 m	57.72
2013	Central American Games	San José, Costa Rica	1st	800 m	2:06.39
2013	Central American Games	San José, Costa Rica	1st	1500 m	4:31.62
2013	Central American Games	San José, Costa Rica	2nd	4 × 400 m relay	3:52.21
2013	South American Championships	Cartagena, Colombia	3rd	800 m	2:03.57
2013	South American Championships	Cartagena, Colombia	3rd	1500 m	4:16.34
2013	Bolivarian Games	Trujillo, Peru	2nd	800 m	2:03.78
2013	Bolivarian Games	Trujillo, Peru	3rd	1500 m	4:15.22
2013	Bolivarian Games	Trujillo, Peru	3rd	3000 m s'chase	10:03.21
2014	South American Games	Santiago, Chile	2nd	1500 m	4:20.81
2014	South American Games	Santiago, Chile	5th	3000 m s'chase	10:35.55
2015	Central American Championships	Managua, Nicaragua	1st	800 m	2:14.36
2015	Central American Championships	Managua, Nicaragua	1st	1500 m	4:37.42
2015	Central American Championships	Managua, Nicaragua	1st	3000 m s'chase	10:39.19
2015	South American Championships	Lima, Peru	6th	800 m	2:10.98
2015	Pan American Games	Toronto, Canada	8th	1500 m	4:23.96
2015	Pan American Games	Toronto, Canada	9th	3000 m s'chase	10:40.10
2017	South American Championships	Asunción, Paraguay	4th	800 m	2:08.58
2017	Bolivarian Games	Santa Marta, Colombia	4th	800 m	2:07.43
2017	Bolivarian Games	Santa Marta, Colombia	4th	1500 m	4:19.59
2017	Bolivarian Games	Santa Marta, Colombia	3rd	3000 m s'chase	10:09.05
2018	South American Games	Cochabamba, Bolivia	–	1500 m	DNF
2018	South American Games	Cochabamba, Bolivia	–	3000 m s'chase	DNF
2018	Central American and Caribbean Games	Barranquilla, Colombia	4th	1500 m	4:25.04
2018	Central American and Caribbean Games	Barranquilla, Colombia	3rd	3000 m s'chase	10:18.92
2019	South American Championships	Lima, Peru	8th	1500 m	4:32.69
2019	South American Championships	Lima, Peru	5th	3000 m s'chase	10:14.00
2019	Pan American Games	Lima, Peru	9th	3000 m s'chase	10:17.21
2022	Bolivarian Games	Valledupar, Colombia	–	1500 m	DNF
