= 2002 Central American Championships in Athletics =

XIV Central American Championships in Athletics
- Dates: October 12-13
- Host city: San José, Costa Rica
- Venue: Estadio Nacional
- Level: kids
- Events: 38 (20 men, 18 women)
- Participation: 7 nations

The 14th Central American Championships in Athletics were held at the Estadio Nacional in San José, Costa Rica, between October 12-13, 2002.

A total of 38 events were contested, 20 by men and 18 by women.

== Medal summary ==
Results and medal winners were published.

=== Men ===
Event	Gold		Silver		Bronze	
100 metres	Bob Colville (CRC)	10.25 CR	Rolando Blanco (GUA)	10.61	Enrique Colville (CRC)	10.66
200 metres	Rolando Blanco (GUA)	22.01	Andrés Leonel Rodríguez (PAN)	22.29	Víctor Cantillano (CRC)	22.37
400 metres	Jonathan Gibson (PAN)	48.71	Selvin Henry (GUA)	48.96	Roberto Cortés (ESA)	49.28
800 metres	Kenneth Otarola (CRC)	1:52.78	Roberto Arroyo (CRC)	1:54.98	Carmen Daniel Hernández (NCA)	1:56.73
1500 metres	Kenneth Otarola (CRC)	3:58.03	José Francisco Chávez (CRC)	4:00.90	Said Gómez (PAN)	4:06.25
5000 metres	Francisco Gómez Vega (CRC)	14:29.72	José Amado García (GUA)	14:30.14	Andres Rizo (CRC)	14:45.96
10000 metres	José Amado García (GUA)	30:05.31	José Chinchilla (CRC)	32:36.88		
3000 metres steeplechase	Francisco Gómez Vega (CRC)	8.54.50 CR	Erick Bonilla (ESA)	9.30.63	César Lizano (CRC)	9.34.05
110 metres hurdles	David Umaña (CRC)	15.65	Anthony Rugama (CRC)	15.81	Edgar Esquina (PAN)	16.26
400 metres hurdles	Jonathan Gibson (PAN)	52.95	Roberto Cortés (ESA)	53.54	David Umaña (CRC)	55.46
High jump	Henry Linton (CRC)	1.95	Emerson Cruz (GUA)	1.80	Jonathan Romero (PAN)	1.80
Long jump	Irving Saladino (PAN)	7.18	Julio González (CRC)	6.88	Juan Carlos Nájera (GUA)	6.57
Triple jump	Álvaro Paiz (GUA)	14.58	Irving Saladino (PAN)	14.51	Juan Carlos Nájera (GUA)	14.42
Shot put	Edson Monzón (GUA)	15.28	Henry Santos (GUA)	14.63	Esteban Caballero (PAN)	13.68
Discus throw	Nelson Chavarría (CRC)	44.20	Raúl Rivera (GUA)	43.16	Raúl Squirre (PAN)	41.59
Hammer throw	Raúl Rivera (GUA)	59.29	Vicente Franco (ESA)	51.97	Nelson Chavarría (CRC)	50.26
Javelin throw	Javier Ugarte (NCA)	62.28	Iván Sibaja (NCA)	58.07	Luis Brenes (CRC)	52.71
20 Kilometres Walk	Allan Segura (CRC)	1:37:51.67	Salvador Mira (ESA)	1:39:14.27	Sergio Gutiérrez (CRC)	1:46:19.23
4 x 100 metres relay	Costa Rica; Oscar Barzuna; Roberto Arroyo; Bob Colville; Antonio Ramírez	41.37	Guatemala; Rolando Blanco; Juan Carlos Nájera; Selvin Henry; Jorge Solórzano	42.83	Panama; Joseph Reynaldo; Andrés Leonel Rodríguez; Irving Saladino; Levyn Hansell	42.86
4 x 400 metres relay	Costa Rica	3.19.88	Panama	3.27.16	Nicaragua; Emilio Morales; Jorge Conde; Jimy Galeano; Carlos Abaunza	3.34.16

=== Women ===
Event	Gold		Silver		Bronze	
100 metres	Gabriela Patterson (CRC)	12.01	Mónica Campos (CRC)	12.08	Adasa Padmore (PAN)	12.31
200 metres (wind: m/s)	Gabriela Patterson (CRC)	25.42	Sigrid Gutiérrez (CRC)	25.83	Amada Martínez (ESA)	26.32
400 metres	Verónica Quijano (ESA)	55.89	Ana Hurtado (GUA)	56.58	Sigrid Gutiérrez (CRC)	58.25
800 metres	Ana Hurtado (GUA)	2:11.47 CR	Raquel Barquero (CRC)	2:16.74	Karen Arce (CRC)	2:16.94
1500 metres	Dina Cruz (GUA)	4:42.30	Elsa Monterroso (GUA)	4:47.72	Reina Obando (NCA)	4:50.22
5000 metres	Elsa Campos (ESA)	17:56.76	Dina Cruz (GUA)	17:57.23	Elsa Monterroso (GUA)	18:01.34
100 metres hurdles (wind: m/s)	Gabriela Carrillo (ESA)	15.72	Migdalia Morgan (PAN)	15.82	Farina Murillo (CRC)	16.05
400 metres hurdles	Verónica Quijano (ESA)	60.87	Cindy Castro (CRC)	64.45	Marcela González (CRC)	65.50
High jump	Gabriela Carrillo (ESA)	1.60	Gabriela Cuellar (ESA)	1.60	Alejandra Gómez (CRC)	1.60
Long jump	Mónica Campos (CRC)	5.50	Sabrina Asturias (GUA)	5.44	Adasa Padmore (PAN)	5.42
Triple jump	María José Paiz (GUA)	13.01 CR	Gabriela Carrillo (ESA)	11.95	Gabriela Cuellar (ESA)	11.24
Shot put	Ismara Francis (PAN)	10.90	María Lourdes Ruiz (NCA)	10.41	Silvia Piñar (CRC)	9.80
Discus throw	Ana Lucía Espinoza (GUA)	43.28 CR	Aixa Middleton (PAN)	38.06	María Lourdes Ruiz (NCA)	37.77
Hammer throw	Ana Lucía Espinoza (GUA)	46.28	Silvia Piñar (CRC)	36.29	Raquel Sanchez (CRC)	31.60
Javelin throw	Dalila Rugama (NCA)	46.62	Karen Villafuerte (ESA)	43.95	Janys Ramírez (NCA)	41.38
10,000 metres Walk	Ivis Martínez (ESA)	50:38.33	María Reinolds (CRC)	1:00:52.32	María Ferris (PAN)	1:02:43.16
4 x 100 metres relay	Costa Rica; Mónica Campos; Indra Hansen; Gabriela Patterson; Sigrid Gutiérrez	47.91	El Salvador; Marcela Navarro; Amada Martínez; Karla Hernández; Verónica Quijano	48.11	Nicaragua; Irma Navarrete; Mayra Álvarez; Auxiliadora Bonilla; Jenny Pérez	50.08
4 x 400 metres relay	El Salvador; Verónica Quijano; Elsa Campos; Amada Martínez; Marcela Navarro	4:05.78	Nicaragua; Jenny Pérez; Denia Mongalo; Reina Obando; Irma Navarrete	4:10.23		

== Medal table (unofficial) ==
* Host nation (Costa Rica)

Rank	Nation	Gold	Silver	Bronze	Total
1	Costa Rica*	15	11	15	41
2	Guatemala	10	11	2	23
3	El Salvador	7	8	3	18
4	Panama	4	5	9	18
5	Nicaragua	2	3	6	11
Totals (5 entries)		38	38	35	111

== Participation ==
A total of 180 athletes from 7 countries were reported to participate:

- Belize
- Costa Rica (65)
- El Salvador (15)
- Guatemala
- Honduras (8)
- Nicaragua (12)
- (Panama) Panamá (24)

== Team Ranking ==
Costa Rica won the overall team ranking.

=== Total ===
The host country is highlighted in lavender blue

Rank	Nation	Points
1st place, gold medalist(s)	Costa Rica	310.5
2nd place, silver medalist(s)	(Panama) Panamá	159
3rd place, bronze medalist(s)	Guatemala	158,5
4	El Salvador	114
5	Nicaragua	114
