= 2006 Central American Junior and Youth Championships in Athletics =

XIX Central American Junior and XIV Central American Youth Championships in Athletics
- Dates: May 11–13
- Host city: Ciudad de Guatemala, Guatemala
- Venue: Estadio Cementos Progreso
- Level: Junior and Youth
- Events: 80 (41 boys, 39 girls)
- Participation: 7 nations
- Records set: 17

The 2006 Central American Junior and Youth Championships in Athletics were held at the Estadio Cementos Progreso in Ciudad de Guatemala, Guatemala, between May 11–13, 2006. Organized by the Central American Isthmus Athletic Confederation (CADICA), it was the 19th edition of the Junior (U-20) and the 14th edition of the Youth (U-18) competition. A total of 80 events were contested, 41 by boys and 39 by girls. Overall winner on points was Guatemala.

== Medal summary ==
Complete results can be found on the CADICA webpage. Records were compiled from the results of the 2007 championships.

=== Junior men ===
Event	Gold		Silver		Bronze	
100 metres (wind: -0.7 m/s)	Rolando Palacios (HON)	10.68	Alonso Edward (PAN)	11.05	Edwin Baltazar (GUA)	11.20
200 metres (wind: +0.7 m/s)	Rolando Palacios (HON)	21.41 CR	Edwin Baltazar (GUA)	22.06	Alonso Edward (PAN)	22.07
400 metres	Edwin Baltazar (GUA)	49.75	Gary Robinson (CRC)	49.89	Guillermo Bermúdez (GUA)	51.45
800 metres	Aurelio Sánchez (NCA)	1:56.33	Carlos Álvarez (GUA)	1:57.65	Lino Pérez (PAN)	1:57.92
1500 metres	Carlos Álvarez (GUA)	4:06.79	Estuardo Palacios (GUA)	4:08.89	Aurelio Sánchez (NCA)	4:11.58
5000 metres	Estuardo Palacios (GUA)	16:01.43	Douglas Omar Aguilar (ESA)	16:02.51	Jeremías Saloj (GUA)	16:04.68
10000 metres	Jeremías Saloj (GUA)	34:08.32	Dimas Castro (NCA)	34:41.89	Alejandro Calderón (CRC)	35:13.09
3000 metres steeplechase	José Raxón (GUA)	10:14.03	Carlos Fernández (CRC)	10:36.23	Nitzar Sandoval (NCA)	10:37.79
110 metres hurdles (wind: +2.2 m/s)	Hans Villagrán (GUA)	14.16 w	Ricardo González (HON)	14.70 w	Alejandro Olmedo (ESA)	14.80 w
400 metres hurdles	Hans Villagrán (GUA)	52.00 CR	Jarel Rivas (ESA)	57.63	Stiven Navarrete (GUA)	57.68
High jump	Alejandro Olmedo (ESA)	2.01m CR	Kevin Leiva (GUA)	1.87m	Felipe Brenes (CRC)	1.75m
Pole vault	Edwin Barrientos (GUA)	4.40m	Daniel Gutiérrez (ESA)	3.70m	Elvis Jiménez (NCA)	3.45m
Long jump	Marvin García (GUA)	6.71m	Néstor Meza (ESA)	6.46m	Ramiro Sandoval (NCA)	6.37m
Triple jump	Kessel Campbell (HON)	15.06m CR	Marvin García (GUA)	14.93m	Josell Ramírez (CRC)	14.34m
Shot put	Luis Folgar (GUA)	13.37m CR	Juan De León (ESA)	13.33m	Emanuel Álvarez (CRC)	13.03m
Discus throw	Emanuel Álvarez (CRC)	42.68m CR	José Barcos (GUA)	39.82m	Atila Pastora (NCA)	38.52m
Hammer throw	José Barcos (GUA)	51.11m CR	Edgar Florián (GUA)	47.95m	Jairo Alvarado (CRC)	44.59m
Javelin throw	Adrián Zepeda (NCA)	56.75m	Elder Contreras (GUA)	48.46m	Jonathan Gómez (CRC)	46.41m
Decathlon	Darvin Colón (HON)	6121 CR	Edwin Campos (CRC)	5392	Alex Evans (BIZ)	3561
10,000 metres Walk	Víctor Hugo Mendoza (ESA)	44:37.78 CR	Yassir Cabrera (PAN)	45:00.00	José Guzmán (ESA)	48:31.27
4 x 100 metres relay	Honduras; Rolando Palacios; Ricardo González; Pedro Suazo; Darvin Colón	42.74	Guatemala; Edwin Baltazar Guillermo Bermúdez; Marvin García	42.91	Costa Rica; Javier Biassetti; Elvis Salinas; Felipe Brenes; Gary Robinson	43.62
4 x 400 metres relay	Guatemala; Edwin Baltazar; Guillermo Bermúdez; Hans Villagrán; Miguel Paz	3:22.91	Costa Rica; Gary Robinson; Edwin Campos; Edrei García; Luis Gómez	3:28.17	Nicaragua; Alvín Vado; Yemil Chavarría; Aurelio Sánchez; Nitzar Sandoval	3:34.13

=== Junior women ===
Event	Gold		Silver		Bronze	
100 metres (wind: -1.4 m/s)	Meissel Gardner (CRC)	12.52	Mirtha Martínez (HON)	12.81	Consuelo Esperanza Vásquez (ESA)	12.90
200 metres (wind: +0.7 m/s)	Meissel Gardner (CRC)	25.69	Sharon Ruiz (CRC)	26.24	Consuelo Esperanza Vásquez (ESA)	26.48
400 metres	Karen Arce (CRC)	59.52	Henriette Guadamuz (NCA)	60.71	Diana Villatoro (HON)	61.50
800 metres	Karen Arce (CRC)	2:21.29	Caterin Ibarra (GUA)	2:23.19	Cecilia Gutiérrez (GUA)	2:25.36
1500 metres	Andrea Ferris (PAN)	5:00.48	Caterin Ibarra (GUA)	5:01.74	Eva María Rodríguez (ESA)	5:08.17
3000 metres	Maritza Chalí (GUA)	11:06.94	Eva María Rodríguez (ESA)	11:18.49	Marta Xuyá (GUA)	11:22.15
5000 metres	Andrea Ferris (PAN)	19:26.34	Eva María Rodríguez (ESA)	19:52.39	Aldy Villalobos (NCA)	20:43.79
100 metres hurdles (wind: +2.3 m/s)	Cindy Sibaja (CRC)	15.72 w	Jéssica Lino (HON)	15.73 w	Pamela Cordero (GUA)	15.94 w
400 metres hurdles	Karen Arce (CRC)	64.81	Pamela Cordero (GUA)	68.58	Jhetzury Arrieta (PAN)	70.02
High jump	Lisbeth Castillo (GUA)	1.53m	Inaly Morazán (NCA); Pamela Jiménez (CRC)	1.45m		
Pole vault	María José Rodas (GUA)	3.00m	Gladys Yesenia Quijada (ESA)	2.70m	Tatiana Domínguez (GUA)	2.50m
Long jump	Meissel Gardner (CRC)	5.54m	Beatriz Willink (CRC)	5.26m	Gladys Yesenia Quijada (ESA)	5.17m
Triple jump	Sharon Ruiz (CRC)	11.84m (wind: +1.3 m/s)	Cindy Sibaja (CRC)	11.62m w (wind: +2.2 m/s)	Gladys Yesenia Quijada (ESA)	11.44m (wind: -0.3 m/s)
Shot put	Aixa Middleton (PAN)	11.48m	Janis Ramírez (NCA)	11.35m	Tamara Nunez (BIZ)	10.32m
Discus throw	Aixa Middleton (PAN)	42.93m CR	Viviana Abarca (CRC)	36.90m	Yahaira Ellington (GUA)	32.99m
Hammer throw	Viviana Abarca (CRC)	41.05m	Raquel Fernández (CRC)	29.15m	Anielka Urrutia (NCA)	28.58m
Javelin throw	Janis Ramírez (NCA)	44.75m	Kimberly Baltazar (GUA)	34.98m	Analis Castillo (PAN)	33.18m
Heptathlon	Kimberly Baltazar (GUA)	3468	Pamela Jiménez (CRC)	3046	Lisbeth Castillo (GUA)	3004
4 x 100 metres relay	Costa Rica; Meissel Gardner; Cindy Sibaja; Sharon Ruiz; Beatriz Willink	49.54	Guatemala; Daphne Hernández; Ingrid Martínez; Pamela Cordero; Alva Ortíz	50.92		
4 x 400 metres relay	El Salvador; Consuelo Esperanza Vásquez; Natalia Santamaría; Andrea Cáceres; Gracia Lozano	4:08.54	Guatemala; Caterin Ibarra; Andrea Álvarez; Pamela Cordero; Cecilia Gutiérrez	4:09.13	Nicaragua; Henriette Guadamuz; Ana Ibarra; Aldy Villalobos; Inaly Morazán	4:31.87

=== Youth boys ===
Event	Gold		Silver		Bronze	
100 metres (wind: -1.3 m/s)	Jhamal Bowen (PAN)	11.31	José Pérez (GUA)	11.59	Daniel Porras (CRC)	11.64
200 metres (wind: +1.3 m/s)	Jhamal Bowen (PAN)	22.83	Javin Usher (BIZ)	23.13	Eduardo Castillo (GUA)	23.39
400 metres	Eduardo Castillo (GUA)	52.03	César Ernesto León (ESA)	53.53	Daniel Herrera (CRC)	54.02
800 metres	Cristian Quintanilla (ESA)	2:05.30	Byron Hernández (GUA)	2:06.40	Oscar Varela (CRC)	2:07.90
1500 metres	Cristian Quintanilla (ESA)	4:24.17	Elmer Ramírez (ESA)	4:25.83	Joseel Aburto (NCA)	4:28.28
3000 metres	Cristian Quintanilla (ESA)	9:26.73	Luis Tahay (GUA)	9:30.68	Carlos René Aguilar (ESA)	9:45.32
2000 metres steeplechase	Luis Tahay (GUA)	6:44.35	Joseel Aburto (NCA)	6:55.44	Josué Mora (CRC)	7:09.46
110 metres hurdles (wind: 2.0 m/s)	Arnoldo Monge (CRC)	14.95 CR	Renán Palma (ESA)	15.27	César Ernesto León (ESA)	15.29
400 metres hurdles	César Ernesto León (ESA)	57.76	Daniel Herrera (CRC)	59.75	José Miguel Solórzano (GUA)	59.79
High jump	Alvin Tillett (BIZ)	1.65m	Oscar Montes (ESA); Carlos Rodríguez (ESA); Sergio Martínez (CRC)	1.60m		
Pole vault	Pedro Daniel Figueroa (ESA)	3.35m	André Carmona (CRC)	2.80m	Jonathan Sandoval (GUA)	2.70m
Long jump	Jhamal Bowen (PAN)	6.51m	Renán Palma (ESA)	6.19m	Eliberto Quijada (ESA)	5.96m
Triple jump	Eliberto Quijada (ESA)	13.15m	Oscar Montes (ESA)	12.97m	Emilio Peña (NCA)	12.94m
Shot put	Julio Aldana (GUA)	11.76m CR	Keilor Rojas (CRC)	11.52m	Oscar Montes (ESA)	11.39m
Javelin throw	Antony Gómez (GUA)	45.37m	Kevin Varela (CRC)	42.40m	Rafael Carmona (NCA)	40.18m
Octathlon	Rafael Carmona (NCA)	3844	Juan Carranza (GUA)	3465	José Roberto Carballo (CRC)	3381
10,000 metres Walk	Néstor Mejía (NCA)	1:00:44.42 CR	Luis Ángel Sánchez (GUA)	1:00:55.38	William Flores (ESA)	1:03:41.17
4 x 100 metres relay	Costa Rica; César Vargas; Daniel Porras; Daniel Herrera; José Garita	45.34	Nicaragua; Álvaro Castillo; Benjamín Vélez; Emilio Hernández; Tony Argenis	46.18	Guatemala; José Pérez; Eduardo Castillo; Tyron Alvarez; Alejandro Abdalla	50.15
4 x 400 metres relay	Costa Rica; Alexandre Carmona; Oscar Varela; Daniel Herrera; Arnoldo Monge	3:34.95	El Salvador; César Ernesto León; Gustavo Ferrer; Elmer Ramírez; Cristian Quintanilla	3:39.95	Guatemala; Eduardo Castillo; Tyron Alvarez; José Luis Cobón; José Miguel Solórzano	3:41.10

=== Youth girls ===
Event	Gold		Silver		Bronze	
100 metres (wind: -0.6 m/s)	Shiffana Flowers (BIZ)	12.59	Mardel Alvarado (PAN)	12.80	Samantha Fernández (HON)	12.81
200 metres (wind: +0.4 m/s)	Shiffana Flowers (BIZ)	25.83	Mardel Alvarado (PAN)	26.18	Stephanie Zamora (CRC)	26.60
400 metres	Yelena Alvear (PAN)	59.99	Josselin Margoth Escobar (ESA)	60.30	Yolide Solís (CRC)	60.83
800 metres	Brenda Salmerón (ESA)	2:19.12	Josselin Margoth Escobar (ESA)	2:22.97	Yizel Méndez (GUA)	2:26.37
1500 metres	Brenda Salmerón (ESA)	4:42.38 CR	Gladys Landaverde (ESA)	4:50.09	Merlin Chalí (GUA)	4:53.99
3000 metres	Merlin Chalí (GUA)	10:30.63 CR	Brenda Salmerón (ESA)	10:43.00	Blanca Solís (ESA)	10:44.96
100 metres hurdles (wind: 2.1 m/s)	Claudia Villeda (GUA)	15.69 w	Gabriela Monge (CRC)	16.19 w	Bessy Flores (ESA)	17.18 w
300 metres hurdles	Ana María Porras (CRC)	46.36	Claudia Villeda (GUA)	47.21	Gabriela Monge (CRC)	47.93
High jump	Kashany Ríos (PAN)	1.61m	Stephanie Rodríguez (CRC); Marcela Blandón (ESA)	1.52m		
Long jump	Estefany Cruz (GUA)	5.26m	Bessy Flores (ESA)	5.00m	Kimberly Morales (CRC)	4.73m
Triple jump	Shiffana Flowers (BIZ)	11.71m CR	Estefany Cruz (GUA)	11.65m	Danel Núñez (HON)	10.77m
Shot put	Lazzy Esquivel (CRC)	9.72m	Catherine Montero (ESA)	8.86m	Raquel Rodríguez (CRC)	8.53m
Discus throw	Catherine Montero (ESA)	27.37m	Lazzy Esquivel (CRC)	26.58m	Fátima Aguilar (ESA)	23.55m
Hammer throw	Lazzy Esquivel (CRC)	32.16m	Fabiola Jovel (ESA)	28.62m	Tiffany Fernández (CRC)	25.56m
Javelin throw	Rocío Navarro (PAN)	35.75m	Sandra Centeno (NCA)	34.23m	Adriana Morales (GUA)	32.50m
Pentathlon	Ana María Porras (CRC)	2674	Andreina Gaitán (CRC)	2204	Andrea Melgar (ESA)	1937
5000 metres Walk	Jamy Franco (GUA)	26:00.97 CR	Brenda Ovando (GUA)	26:21.90	Mónica Mejía (ESA)	26:45.65
4 x 100 metres relay	Panama; Kashany Ríos; Yelena Alvear; Joseline Nuñez; Mardel Alvarado	51.82	Costa Rica; Gabriela Monge; Stephanie Zamora; Reina Morales; Kimberly Morales	52.16	El Salvador; Marcela Blandón; Tania Rodríguez; Bessy Flores; Lissette Mejía	52.38
4 x 400 metres relay	El Salvador; Brenda Salmerón; Bessy Flores; Josselin Margoth Escobar; Tania Rodríguez	4:08.24	Costa Rica; Yolide Solís; Stephanie Zamora; Gabriela Monge; Reina Morales	4:11.80	Guatemala; Catalina Aguilar; Yizel Méndez; Claudia Villeda; Joanna Ubico	4:17.51

== Medal table (unofficial) ==
* Host nation (Guatemala)

Rank	Nation	Gold	Silver	Bronze	Total
1	Guatemala (GUA)*	24	23	19	66
2	Costa Rica (CRC)	18	22	18	58
3	El Salvador (ESA)	13	24	18	55
4	Panama (PAN)	11	4	4	19
5	Nicaragua (NIC)	5	7	12	24
6	Honduras (HON)	5	3	3	11
7	Belize (BIZ)	4	1	2	7
Totals (7 entries)		80	84	76	240

== Team trophies ==
The placing table for team trophy awarded to the 1st place overall team (boys and girls categories) was published.

=== Overall ===
The host country is highlighted in lavender blue

Rank	Nation	Points
1st place, gold medalist(s)	Guatemala	404
2	Costa Rica	404.5 (?)
3	El Salvador	351.5

== Participation ==
The number of athletes of some teams participating in the event was reported.

- Belize
- Costa Rica
- El Salvador (53)
- Guatemala
- Honduras
- Nicaragua (39)
- (Panama) Panamá (15)
