= Salvador Mira =

Salvadoran race walker

Personal information
- Full name: Salvador Ernesto Mira Vásquez
- Nationality: El Salvador
- Born: 23 August 1984 (age 41) Mejicanos, San Salvador, El Salvador
- Height: 1.63 m (5 ft 4 in)
- Weight: 59 kg (130 lb)

Sport
- Sport: Athletics
- Event: Race walking

Achievements and titles
- Personal bests: 20 km walk: 1:26:09 (2005); 50 km walk: 3:59:51 (2007)
- Updated on 9 July 2014

Salvador Ernesto Mira Vásquez (born 23 August 1984) is a Salvadoran race walker. He set both a national record and a personal best time of 3:59:51, by finishing fourth in the men's 50 km race walk at the 2007 Pan American Games in Rio de Janeiro, Brazil.

Mira represented El Salvador at the 2008 Summer Olympics, where he competed for the men's 50 km race walk. Mira received a final warning (a total of three red cards) for not following the proper form during the 25 km lap, and was subsequently disqualified from the competition.

== Personal best ==
- 20 km race walk: 1:26:09 hrs – San Salvador, El Salvador, 10 December 2005
- 50 km race walk: 3:59:51 hrs – Rio de Janeiro, Brazil, 28 July 2007

== Achievements ==
Year	Competition	Venue	Position	Event	Notes
Representing El Salvador
2001	World Youth Championships	Debrecen, Hungary	13th	10,000m walk	45:40.76 min
2002	Central American and Caribbean Junior Championships (U-20)	Bridgetown, Barbados	4th	10,000m walk	46:48.91 min
2002	World Junior Championships	Kingston, Jamaica	–	10,000 m track walk	DNF
2002	Central American Championships	San José, Costa Rica	2nd	20,000 m track walk	1:39:14.27 hrs
2002	Central American and Caribbean Games	San Salvador, El Salvador	4th	20 km walk	1:33:43 hrs
2003	Central American Junior Championships	San José, Costa Rica	1st	10,000 m track walk	47:12.64
2004	Central American Championships	Managua, Nicaragua	2nd	20,000 m track walk	1:32:33.66 hrs NR
2006	World Race Walking Cup	A Coruña, Spain	40th	50 km walk	4:12:53 hrs
2006	NACAC Under-23 Championships	Santo Domingo, Dominican Republic	1st	20,000m walk	1:31:42 hrs
2006	Central American and Caribbean Games	Cartagena, Colombia	–	20 km walk	DQ
2007	ALBA Games	Caracas, Venezuela	1st	20 km walk	1:29:44 hrs
2007	Pan American Games	Rio de Janeiro, Brazil	4th	50 km walk	3:59.51 hrs NR
2008	World Race Walking Cup	Cheboksary, Russia	–	50 km walk	DQ
2008	Olympic Games	Beijing, China	–	50 km walk	DQ
2009	Pan American Race Walking Cup	San Salvador, El Salvador	5th	50 km walk	4:15:48 hrs
2013	Central American Race Walking Championships	Guatemala City, Guatemala	3rd	20 km walk	1:43:40 hrs
2013	Central American Games	San José, Costa Rica	5th	20 km road walk	1:35:33
2013	Pan American Race Walking Cup	Guatemala City, Guatemala	25th	20 km road walk	1:37:39
2013	Central American Championships	Managua, Nicaragua	3rd	20,000 m track walk	1:35:43.46
2013	Central American and Caribbean Championships	Morelia, Mexico	4th	20 km road walk	1:42:44
