= Aixa Middleton =

Panamanian athletics competitor

Personal information
- Born: 6 February 1988 (age 38)

Sport
- Sport: Track and field
- Event(s): Discus throw Shot put

Aixa Middleton González (born 6 February 1988) is a Panamanian track and field athlete who competes in the discus throw. Her personal best of 55.00 m (180 ft 5 1/4 in) is the Panamanian national record for the event. She has represented her country at the Central American and Caribbean Games (2010, 2014), the South American Championships in Athletics (2013, 2015), the Ibero-American Championships in Athletics (2010, 2014) and the 2015 Pan American Games.

Middleton won her first senior medal at the 2002 Central American Championships in Athletics at the age of 14, taking the discus silver medal. She was highly successful in regional age category competitions: competing in both shot put and discus, she took four gold medals as a youth athlete at the Central American Junior and Youth Championships in Athletics before going on to win five gold medals as a junior (under-20). As a senior, she is the dominant thrower in Central America, having won eight titles Central American Championships in Athletics and taken three gold medals at the Central American Games. She is the meet record holder at both meets, with a 55 metres championship record and a 49.08 m (161 ft 1/4 in) games record.

She studied at the Technological University of Panama and gained a bachelor's degree in electromechanical engineering in 2012 before gaining a post-graduate degree in business management in 2014.

== International competitions ==
Year	Competition	Venue	Position	Event	Notes
2002	Central American Championships	San José, Costa Rica	2nd	Discus throw	38.06 m
2003	Central American Youth Championships	San José, Costa Rica	1st	Shot put	10.81 m
2003	Central American Youth Championships	San José, Costa Rica	1st	Discus throw	37.92 m CR
2003	Central American Championships	Guatemala City, Guatemala	2nd	Discus throw	36.77 m
2004	Central American Youth Championships	San José, Costa Rica	1st	Shot put	10.07 m
2004	Central American Youth Championships	San José, Costa Rica	1st	Discus throw	38.20 m CR
2004	Central American Youth Championships	San José, Costa Rica	2nd	Hammer throw	24.03 m
2004	South American Youth Championships	Guayaquil, Ecuador	2nd	Discus throw	39.17 m
2005	Central American Championships	San José, Costa Rica	3rd	Shot put	11.41 m
2005	Central American Championships	San José, Costa Rica	1st	Discus throw	43.15 m
2005	Central American Junior Championships	Managua, Nicaragua	1st	Shot put	11.33 m
2005	Central American Junior Championships	Managua, Nicaragua	1st	Discus throw	42.95 m CR
2006	Central American Junior Championships	Guatemala City, Guatemala	1st	Shot put	11.48 m
2006	Central American Junior Championships	Guatemala City, Guatemala	1st	Discus throw	42.93 m CR
2007	Central American Junior Championships	San Salvador, El Salvador	2nd	Shot put	10.95 m
2007	Central American Junior Championships	San Salvador, El Salvador	1st	Discus throw	44.67 m CR
2007	Central American Championships	San José, Costa Rica	1st	Discus throw	45.13 m CR
2010	Central American Games	Panama City, Panama	1st	Shot put	11.74 m
2010	Central American Games	Panama City, Panama	1st	Discus throw	47.10 m
2010	Central American Games	Panama City, Panama	4th	Hammer throw	33.24 m
2010	Central American Championships	Guatemala City, Guatemala	2nd	Shot put	11.46 m
2010	Central American Championships	Guatemala City, Guatemala	2nd	Discus throw	44.27 m
2010	Central American and Caribbean Games	Mayagüez, Puerto Rico	6th	Discus throw	46.84 m
2010	Ibero-American Championships	San Fernando, Spain	—	Discus throw	NM
2011	Central American Championships	San José, Costa Rica	2nd	Shot put	11.66 m
2011	Central American Championships	San José, Costa Rica	1st	Discus throw	46.28 m CR
2012	Central American Championships	Managua, Nicaragua	2nd	Shot put	11.63 m
2012	Central American Championships	Managua, Nicaragua	1st	Discus throw	43.71 m
2013	Central American Championships	Managua, Nicaragua	1st	Shot put	12.28 m
2013	Central American Championships	Managua, Nicaragua	1st	Discus throw	49.71 m CR
2013	Central American Games	San José, Costa Rica	2nd	Shot put	12.48 m
2013	Central American Games	San José, Costa Rica	1st	Discus throw	49.08 m GR
2013	Bolivarian Games	Trujillo, Peru	3rd	Discus throw	51.94 m
2013	South American Championships	Cartagena, Colombia	7th	Discus throw	51.02 m
2014	South American Games	Santiago, Chile	6th	Discus throw	51.37 m
2014	Ibero-American Championships	São Paulo, Brazil	5th	Discus throw	51.63 m
2014	Central American and Caribbean Games	Xalapa, Mexico	5th	Discus throw	51.59 m
2015	South American Championships	Lima, Peru	6th	Discus throw	50.70 m
2015	Central American Championships	Managua, Nicaragua	1st	Shot put	12.32 m
2015	Central American Championships	Managua, Nicaragua	1st	Discus throw	55.00 m CR
2015	Pan American Games	Toronto, Canada	9th	Discus throw	50.62 m
2016	Central American Championships	San Salvador, El Salvador	2nd	Shot put	12.27 m
2016	Central American Championships	San Salvador, El Salvador	1st	Discus throw	50.66 m
2017	Central American Championships	Tegucigalpa, Honduras	1st	Shot put	12.92 m
2017	Central American Championships	Tegucigalpa, Honduras	1st	Discus throw	49.87 m
2017	Bolivarian Games	Santa Marta, Colombia	2nd	Discus throw	54.74 m
2018	Central American Championships	Guatemala City, Guatemala	2nd	Shot put	12.16 m
2018	Central American Championships	Guatemala City, Guatemala	1st	Discus throw	52.41 m
2018	Central American and Caribbean Games	Barranquilla, Colombia	5th	Discus throw	53.97 m
2019	Central American Championships	Managua, Nicaragua	1st	Discus throw	52.31 m
2019	South American Championships	Lima, Peru	5th	Discus throw	50.57 m
2019	Pan American Games	Lima, Peru	9th	Discus throw	53.80 m
2021	Central American Championships	San José, Costa Rica	1st	Discus throw	47.91 m
2022	Central American Championships	Managua, Nicaragua	1st	Discus throw	46.90 m
2022	Bolivarian Games	Valledupar, Colombia	4th	Discus throw	49.11 m
2023	Central American Championships	San José, Costa Rica	3rd	Shot put	11.61 m
2023	Central American Championships	San José, Costa Rica	1st	Discus throw	46.11 m
2023	Central American and Caribbean Games	San Salvador, El Salvador	5th	Discus throw	49.63 m
2024	Central American Championships	San Salvador, El Salvador	2nd	Shot put	11.59 m
2024	Central American Championships	San Salvador, El Salvador	1st	Discus throw	45.34 m
