= 2007 Central American Junior and Youth Championships in Athletics =

XX Central American Junior and XV Central American Youth Championships in Athletics
- Dates: May 25–27
- Host city: San Salvador, El Salvador
- Venue: Estadio Nacional Flor Blanca "Magico Gonzalez"
- Level: Junior and Youth
- Events: 76 (42 boys, 34 girls)
- Participation: 320 athletes from 6 nations
- Records set: 26

The 2007 Central American Junior and Youth Championships in Athletics were held at the Estadio Nacional Flor Blanca "Magico Gonzalez" in San Salvador, El Salvador, between May 25–27, 2007. Organized by the Central American Isthmus Athletic Confederation (CADICA), it was the 20th edition of the Junior (U-20) and the 15th edition of the Youth (U-18) competition. A total of 76 events were contested, 42 by boys and 34 by girls. Overall winner on points was Costa Rica.

== Medal summary ==
Complete results can be found on the CADICA webpage.

=== Junior ===
==== Boys (U-20) ====
Event	Gold		Silver		Bronze	
100 metres (wind: -2.9 m/s)	Alonso Edward (PAN)	10.59	Javier Biassetti (CRC)	11.21	Marvin García (GUA)	11.25
200 metres (wind: -1.2 m/s)	Alonso Edward (PAN)	21.08 CR	Javier Biassetti (CRC)	22.45	César Cornejo (ESA)	22.65
400 metres	José González (CRC)	49.42	César Cornejo (ESA)	49.57	Alfonso Centeno (PAN)	50.66
800 metres	Marvin Arita (HON)	1:58.63	Josué Montoya (CRC)	1:59.34	Gustavo Hernández (ESA)	1:59.84
1500 metres	Juan Sánchez (PAN)	4:15.36	Marvin Arita (HON)	4:15.72	Nitzar Sandoval (NCA)	4:16.67
5000 metres	Juan Sánchez (PAN)	15:53.18	Juan Chay (GUA)	15:55.82	Dimas Castro (NCA)	15:59.84
10000 metres	Jeremías Saloj (GUA)	32.01.14 CR	Dimas Castro (NCA)	33.10.24	Guillermo Isai Delgado (ESA)	33.15.36
3000 metres steeplechase	Nitzar Sandoval (NCA)	10.00.12	Douglas Omar Aguilar (ESA)	10.02.13	Nelson Sevilla (NCA)	10.07.45
110 metres hurdles (wind: -3.1 m/s)	Pedro Suazo (HON)	15.79 CR	Óscar Orlando Vásquez (ESA)	16.01	Edgar Álvarez (GUA)	16.17
400 metres hurdles	Alfonso Centeno (PAN)	56.16	Óscar Orlando Vásquez (ESA)	56.76	Leonardo Pereira (CRC)	58.33
High jump	Mario Paz (HON)	1.73	Edin Escobar (GUA)	1.73		
Long jump	Marvin García (GUA)	6.83	Marvin Aguilar (GUA)	6.43	Alberto Perriman (PAN)	6.25
Triple jump	Marvin García (GUA)	15.10 w (wind: 2.9 m/s)	Alberto Perriman (PAN)	13.55 (NWI)	Luis Ángel Gómez (CRC)	13.21 w (wind: 2.5 m/s)
Shot put	Luis Folgar (GUA)	15.13	Jairo Alvarado (CRC)	13.76	Edgar Florián (GUA)	13.20
Discus throw	Emanuel Álvarez (CRC)	44.60 CR	Luis Folgar (GUA)	40.16	Kairo Martínez (NCA)	39.78
Hammer throw	Edgar Florián (GUA)	47.22	Jason Masís (CRC)	44.78	Jairo Alvarado (CRC)	42.70
Javelin throw	Edin Trigueros (GUA)	51.30	Nelson Zúñiga (NCA)	45.99	Juan Carlos del Cid Mercado (ESA)	40.00
Decathlon	Edwin Campos (CRC)	5526	Néstor Meza (ESA)	5210	José González (GUA)	4478
10,000 metres Walk	Emerson Esnal Hernández (ESA)	44:05.79 CR	Víctor Hugo Mendoza (ESA)	44:05.83	Mario Bran (GUA)	44:46.96
4 x 100 metres relay	Costa Rica; Luis Ángel Gómez; Javier Biassetti; Josué Montoya; José González	42.97	Guatemala; Marvin García; Marvin Aguilar; Samuel Grajeda; Miguel Paz	43.17	El Salvador; Óscar Orlando Vásquez; César Cornejo; Salvador Ernesto García; Juan Francisco Cuellar	43.21
4 x 400 metres relay	Panama; Juan Sánchez; Alonso Edward; Alfonso Centeno; Alberto Perriman	3:23.01	El Salvador; César Cornejo; Salvador Ernesto García; Óscar Orlando Vásquez; Juan Francisco Cuellar	3:26.84	Guatemala; Elmer Noj; Miguel Paz; José Méndez; Stiven Navarrete	3:27.20

==== Girls (U-20) ====
Event	Gold		Silver		Bronze	
100 metres (wind: +1.3 m/s)	Consuelo Esperanza Vásquez (ESA)	12.61	Diana Villatoro (HON)	12.68	Cindy Sibaja (CRC)	12.92
200 metres (wind: 0.0 m/s)	Jessica Lino (HON)	26.42 CR	Consuelo Esperanza Vásquez (ESA)	26.53	Diana Villatoro (HON)	26.96
400 metres	Caterin Ibarra (GUA)	60.79	Gracia María Guerrero (ESA)	60.98	Karen Arce (CRC)	61.53
800 metres	Cecilia María Gutiérrez (GUA)	2:19.20	Caterin Ibarra (GUA)	2:22.66	Marbely Pozo (NCA)	2:23.35
1500 metres	Cecilia María Gutiérrez (GUA)	4.53.4	Eva María Rodríguez (ESA)	5.06.6	María Fernanda Mora (CRC)	5.44.9
3000 metres	Cecilia María Gutiérrez (GUA)	11:03.18	Eva María Rodríguez (ESA)	11:21.45	Ligia Morales (GUA)	11:55.88
3000 metres steeplechase	Ligia Morales (GUA)	12:38.65 CR	Eva María Rodríguez (ESA)	13:08.45	María Fernanda Mora (CRC)	14:06.02
100 metres hurdles (wind: -2.3 m/s)	Pamela Jiménez (CRC)	15.91	Jessica Lino (HON)	16.23	Cindy Sibaja (CRC)	16.24
400 metres hurdles	Karen Arce (CRC)	66.62	Ethel Guevara (CRC)	70.67	Susana Carolina Rodríguez (ESA)	70.96
Shot put	Janis Ramírez (NCA)	11.02	Aixa Middleton (PAN)	10.95	Flor Ugarte (NCA)	10.12
Discus throw	Aixa Middleton (PAN)	44.67 CR	Yahaira Ellington (GUA)	31.18	Jennifer Yamibel Palma (HON)	29.99
Hammer throw	Liliana Stefany Ayala (ESA)	30.01	Yahaira Ellington (GUA)	28.47	Raquel Fernández (CRC)	27.60
10,000 metres Walk	Mayra Herrera (GUA)	53:31.75	Francisca Ferris (PAN)	55:45.15	Betsy García (ESA)	57:23.30
4 x 100 metres relay	Costa Rica; Cindy Sibaja; Grettel Campos; Pamela Jiménez; Yendry Ugalde	51.40	El Salvador; Susana Carolina Rodríguez; Consuelo Esperanza Vásquez; Gracia María Guerrero; Yesenia Quijada	52.60		
4 x 400 metres relay	Costa Rica; Pamela Jiménez; Yendry Ugalde; Ethel Guevara; Karen Arce	4:10.24	El Salvador; Consuelo Esperanza Vásquez; Gracia María Guerrero; Susana Carolina Rodríguez; Yesenia Quijada	4:12.70	Nicaragua; Ana Gabriela Granados; Agne Oporta; Sara Reyes; Marbely Pozo	4:16.12

=== Youth ===
==== Boys (U-18) ====
Event	Gold		Silver		Bronze	
100 metres (wind: -2.3 m/s)	Álvaro Castillo (NCA)	11.59	Eduardo Castillo (GUA)	11.60	Sidney Fearon (GUA)	11.80
200 metres (wind: 1.0 m/s)	Renán Palma (ESA)	22.60	Arnoldo Monge (CRC)	22.90	Eduardo Castillo (GUA)	23.21
400 metres	Eduardo Castillo (GUA)	51.45	Oscar Varela (CRC)	51.63	Benjamín Veliz (NCA)	51.73
800 metres	Oscar Varela (CRC)	2:01.36	Elmer Ramírez (ESA)	2:02.70	Francisco Castellanos (GUA)	2:02.83
1500 metres	José Raxón (GUA)	4:17.33	Luis Mendoza (GUA)	4:20.01	Elmer Ramírez (ESA)	4:21.95
3000 metres	José Raxón (GUA)	9.01.25	Carlos René Aguilar (ESA)	9.26.50	Luis Mendoza (GUA)	9.33.85
2000 metres steeplechase	Josué Mora (CRC)	6:34.82	Carlos René Aguilar (ESA)	6:46.70	Abner López (GUA)	6:54.27
110 metres hurdles (wind: -4.5 m/s)	Renán Palma (ESA)	14.55 CR	Arnoldo Monge (CRC)	15.72	Iván Lu (PAN)	16.08
400 metres hurdles	Arnoldo Monge (CRC)	54.98 CR	César Ernesto León (ESA)	57.11	Andre Carmona (CRC)	58.82
High jump	Jason Castro (HON)	1.81	Silvestre Paterson (PAN)	1.78	Sergio Dennis Martínez (CRC)	1.63
Pole vault	Pedro Daniel Figueroa (ESA)	4.10 CR	Mario Meza (CRC)	3.20	Andrés Bermúdez (CRC)	3.00
Long jump	Jason Castro (HON)	6.53	Sidney Fearon (GUA)	6.30	Daniel Herrera (CRC)	6.22
Triple jump	Jason Castro (HON)	13.86	Emilio Peña (NCA)	13.84	Oscar Montes (ESA)	13.29
Shot put	Luis Olivas (CRC)	13.18	Keilor Rojas (CRC)	12.49	Eliberto Quijada (ESA)	12.29
Discus throw	Joel Domínguez (PAN)	40.73	Carlos Montiel (NCA)	36.53	Cristian Gilberto Jovel (ESA)	33.43
Hammer throw	Andrés Chacón (CRC)	37.72	Giorgio Banes (CRC)	32.20	Carlos Montiel (NCA)	30.14
Javelin throw	Benigno Ortega (PAN)	53.48	Kevin Varela (CRC)	48.01	Rafael Carmona (NCA)	44.27
Octathlon	Alexandre Carmona (CRC)	4815 CR	Rafael Carmona (NCA)	4363	Marco Antonio Rodríguez (ESA)	4243
10 Kilometres Road Walk	Patrick Mathuz (GUA)	54:13.18 CR	Néstor Jahid Mejía (NCA)	56:47.16	William Flores (ESA)	57:11.84
4 x 100 metres relay	Guatemala; Benjamín Rodríguez; Eduardo Castillo; José Miguel Solórzano; José Camargo	44.30 CR	Costa Rica; César Vargas; Daniel Porras; José Garita; Daniel Herrera	44.79	El Salvador; César Ernesto León; Renán Palma; Vladimir Alberto Escobar; Eliberto Quijada	45.77
1000m Medley relay (100m x 200m x 300m x 400m)	Costa Rica; Arnoldo Monge; Daniel Herrera; Oscar Varela; José Garita	2:02.02 CR	Guatemala; Benjamín Rodríguez; Eduardo Castillo; José Miguel Solórzano; Sidney Fearon	2:03.01	El Salvador; César Ernesto León; Eliberto Quijada; Renán Palma; Vladimir Alberto Escobar	2:05.30

==== Girls (U-18) ====
Event	Gold		Silver		Bronze	
100 metres (wind: 1.3 m/s)	Lissette Mejía (ESA)	12.41 CR	Mardel Alvarado (PAN)	12.43	Shantelly Scott (CRC)	13.21
200 metres (wind: 0.8 m/s)	Mardel Alvarado (PAN)	25.23 CR	Lissette Mejía (ESA)	25.28	Stephanie Zamora (CRC)	25.57
400 metres	Stephanie Zamora (CRC)	57.25 CR	Yelena Alvear (PAN)	58.95	Yolide Solís (CRC)	59.07
800 metres	Brenda Salmerón (ESA)	2:10.66 CR	Gladys Landaverde (ESA)	2:13.44	Reina Morales (CRC)	2:30.97
1500 metres	Brenda Salmerón (ESA)	4:38.73 CR	Cony Villalobos (NCA)	4:54.53	Blanca Solís (ESA)	5:00.97
3000 metres	Brenda Salmerón (ESA)	10:18.33 CR	Blanca Solís (ESA)	10:41.12	Reginalda Mijangos (GUA)	11:05.63
100 metres hurdles (wind: -0.3 m/s)	Ana María Porras (CRC)	15.37	Claudia Villeda (GUA)	15.86	Bessy Flores (ESA)	17.03
400 metres hurdles	Ana María Porras (CRC)	65.75	Bessy Flores (ESA)	66.70	Francini Jiménez (CRC)	69.13
High jump	Kashani Ríos (PAN)	1.62 CR	Ana María Porras (CRC)	1.56	Marcela Blandón (ESA)	1.53
Long jump	Estefany Cruz (GUA)	5.44	Ana Mariella Roca (ESA)	4.97	Mariela Varela (CRC)	4.88
Triple jump	Estefany Cruz (GUA)	11.78 CR	Mariela Varela (CRC)	10.95	Nicole Carboni (CRC)	10.55
Shot put	Lazzy Esquivel (CRC)	10.06	Catherine Montero (ESA)	9.26	Raquel Rodríguez (CRC)	8.96
Discus throw	Lazzy Esquivel (CRC)	31.09	Jammela Guzmán (GUA)	29.03	Catherine Montero (ESA)	27.87
Hammer throw	Fabiola Jovel (ESA)	39.98	Edith Cortés (NCA)	31.86	Lazzy Esquivel (CRC)	31.76
Javelin throw	Rocío Navarro (PAN)	40.47	Lorena Medina (ESA)	38.09	Sandra Centeno (NCA)	37.76
Heptathlon	Maireth Soto (CRC)	2993	Andreina Gaitán (CRC)	2965	Andrea Melgar (ESA)	2826
5000 metres Walk	Jamy Franco (GUA)	23:31.28 CR	Mónica Mejía (ESA)	25:57.75	Pamela Ramírez (CRC)	27:51.84
4 x 100 metres relay	Costa Rica; Ana María Porras; Stephanie Zamora; Shantelly Scott; Mariela Varela	49.69 CR	El Salvador; Bessy Flores; Fátima Castro; Lissette Mejía; Ana Mariella Roca	49.79	Guatemala; Claudia Villeda; Estefany Cruz; Joanna Ubico; Joselyn Franzua	50.92
1000m Medley relay (100m x 200m x 300m x 400m)	Costa Rica; Ana María Porras; Stephanie Zamora; Shantelly Scott; Yolide Solís	2.17.47 CR	El Salvador; Brenda Salmerón; Fátima Castro; Josselin Margoth Escobar; Lissette Mejía	2.18.11	Panama; Kashani Ríos; Mardel Alvarado; Rocío Navarro; Yelena Alvear	2.23.72

== Medal table (unofficial) ==
* Host nation (El Salvador)

Rank	Nation	Gold	Silver	Bronze	Total
1	Costa Rica (CRC)	23	17	23	63
2	Guatemala (GUA)	20	14	14	48
3	Panama (PAN)	12	6	4	22
4	El Salvador (ESA)*	11	28	20	59
5	Honduras (HON)	7	3	2	12
6	Nicaragua (NIC)	3	8	11	22
Totals (6 entries)		76	76	74	226

== Team trophies ==
The placing table for team trophy awarded to the 1st place overall team (boys and girls categories) was published.

=== Overall ===
The host country is highlighted in lavender blue

Rank	Nation	Points
1st place, gold medalist(s)	Costa Rica	481
2	El Salvador	414
3	Guatemala	362
4	Nicaragua	151
5	(Panama) Panamá	
6	Honduras	

== Participation ==
A total number of 320 athletes were reported to participate in the event. Belize did not send athletes.

- Costa Rica (80)
- El Salvador (67)
- Guatemala
- Honduras
- Nicaragua
- (Panama) Panamá
