= 2012 Central American Championships in Athletics =

XXIII Central American Championships in Athletics
- Dates: June 15-17
- Host city: Managua, Nicaragua
- Venue: Estadio de Atletismo del Instituto Nicaragüense de Deportes
- Level: Senior
- Events: 44 (22 men, 22 women)
- Participation: 7 nations

The 23rd Central American Championships in Athletics were held at the Estadio de Atletismo del Instituto Nicaragüense de Deportes in Managua, Nicaragua, between June 15-17, 2012.

A total of 44 events were contested, 22 by men and 22 by women.

== Medal summary ==
Complete results and medal winners were published.

=== Men ===
Event	Gold		Silver		Bronze	
100 metres (wind: NWI)	Mateo Edward (PAN)	10.46	Kemner Watson (CRC)	10.66	Josef Norales (HON)	10.72
200 metres (wind: 0.3 m/s)	Alonso Edward (PAN)	21.23	Andrés Rodríguez (PAN)	21.35	Gary Robinson (CRC)	21.48
400 metres	Gary Robinson (CRC)	47.84	Kessel Campbell (HON)	48.43	César Andrey Vásquez (CRC)	48.89
800 metres	Edgar Cortés (NCA)	1:53.03	Mario Guerrero (NCA)	1:55.05	Álvaro Vásquez (NCA)	1:55.14
1500 metres	Álvaro Vásquez (NCA)	3:54.66	Irving Sánchez (PAN)	3:55.70	Wilson Solano (CRC)	3:59.53
5000 metres	José Francisco Chaves (CRC)	14:55.94	Estuardo Palacios (GUA)	14:57.17	Edwin Pirir (GUA)	15:02.58
10,000 metres	Edwin Pirir (GUA)	31:32.3	César Lizano (CRC)	31:38.1	José Francisco Chaves (CRC)	31:39.4
110 metres hurdles (wind: 1.2 m/s)	Ronald Bennett (HON)	13.82 CR	Esteban Guzman (HON)	14.40	Luis Carlos Bonilla (GUA)	14.56
400 metres hurdles	Kenneth Medwood (BIZ)	49.81	Gerald Drummond (CRC)	53.33	Gerber Blanco (GUA)	53.95
3000 metres steeplechase	Álvaro Vásquez (NCA)	9:06.88	Miguel Ángel Chan (GUA)	9:41.19	Douglas Aguilar (ESA)	9:55.50
4 x 100 metres relay	Costa Rica; Gary Robinson; César Andrey Vásquez; Jorge Luis Jiménez; Kemner Watson	41.44	Panama; Williams Ríos; Juan Mosquera; Andrés Rodríguez; Mateo Edward	42.45	Honduras; Esteban Guzman; Ronald Bennett; Josef Norales; Helson Pitillo	42.51
4 x 400 metres relay	Costa Rica; Gary Robinson; César Andrey Vásquez; Jarlex Lynch; Gerald Drummond	3:12.42 CR	Belize; Brandon Jones; Kenneth Medwood; Chavis Lopez; Mark Anderson	3:19.33	Nicaragua; Mario Guerrero; Humberto Lugo; Jeffry Arcia; Edgar Cortés	3:19.56
20 Kilometres Road Walk	Mario Bran (GUA)	1:26:41.18	Bernardo Calvo (CRC)	1:31:36.92	Allan Segura (CRC)	1:33:23.96
High jump	Henry Linton (CRC)	2.05	Henry Edmon (PAN)	2.05	William Figueroa (CRC)	1.93
Pole vault	Pedro Figueroa (ESA)	4.71 CR	Mario Meza (CRC)	3.80		
Long jump	Juan Mosquera (PAN)	7.24	Brandon Jones (BIZ)	7.20	Emetrio Gamboa (GUA)	6.80
Triple jump	Brandon Jones (BIZ)	15.47	Jason Castro (HON)	14.78	Juan Carlos Nájera (GUA)	14.50
Shot put	José Miguel Estrada (GUA)	14.97	Roberto Sawyers (CRC)	14.64	Juan José Alvarez (HON)	14.45
Discus throw	Winston Campbell (HON)	50.51 CR	Roberto Sawyers (CRC)	49.54	Juan Galdamez (ESA)	42.14
Hammer throw	Roberto Sawyers (CRC)	67.71 CR	Edgar Florián (GUA)	59.73	Diego Berríos (GUA)	57.20
Javelin throw	Luis Mario Taracena (GUA)	62.45	Erick Méndez (CRC)	57.96	Javier Ugarte (NCA)	57.95
Decathlon	Edwin Campos (CRC)	5443	José Roberto Carballo (CRC)	5079	Alen Calderon (NCA)	5013

=== Women ===
Event	Gold		Silver		Bronze	
100 metres (wind: NWI)	Ruth-Cassandra Hunt (PAN)	11.97	Sharolyn Joseph (CRC)	12.25	Tricia Flores (BIZ)	12.34
200 metres (wind: 1.5 m/s)	Ruth-Cassandra Hunt (PAN)	24.30	Shaneve Swift (BIZ)	24.82	Heidy Palacios (HON)	25.02 NR
400 metres	Andrea Ferris (PAN)	55.17	Heidy Palacios (HON)	55.24 NR	Shaneve Swift (BIZ)	56.93
800 metres	Andrea Ferris (PAN)	2:03.91 CR	Gladys Landaverde (ESA)	2:07.87	Jacqueline Montoya (CRC)	2:17.11
1500 metres	Andrea Ferris (PAN)	4:20.00 CR	Gladys Landaverde (ESA)	4:22.28	Zuna Portillo (ESA)	4:28.95
5000 metres	Mónica Vargas (CRC)	18:03.44	Cristina Marín (CRC)	18:06.04	Delbin Cartagena (ESA)	18:22.94
10,000 metres	Cristina Marín (CRC)	38:24.03	Delbin Cartagena (ESA)	39:21.02	Alicia Zorrilla (PAN)	43:20.06
100 metres hurdles (wind: -0.1 m/s)	Jeimmy Bernárdez (HON)	13.99 CR	Naomi Smith (CRC)	15.63	Alexia Neal (BIZ)	15.87
400 metres hurdles	Jessica Aguilera (NCA)	63.66	Alexia Neal (BIZ)	67.47	Naomi Smith (CRC)	69.14
3000 metres steeplechase	Zuna Portillo (ESA)	10.49.82 CR	Evonne Marroquín (GUA)	11.20.92	Yelka Mairena (NCA)	11.41.67
4 x 100 metres relay	Costa Rica; Diana Garita; Shantely Scott; Dessiré Bermúdez; Sharolyn Joseph	47.68	Panama; Gabriela Guevara; Ruth-Cassandra Hunt; Nathalee Aranda; Kashani Ríos	47.79	Belize; Shantel Swift; Shaneve Swift; Irice Reyes; Charnelle Enríquez	50.29
4 x 400 metres relay	Costa Rica; Diana Garita; Shantely Scott; Dessiré Bermúdez; Glenda Davis	3:55.71	Nicaragua; Jessica Aguilera; Ingrid Narváez; Emilia Palma; Ana Granados	4:00.46	Panama; Yilibeth Stephens; Gabriela Guevara; Nathalee Aranda; Andrea Ferris	4:00.99
10 Kilometres Walk	Francisca Ferris (PAN)	55:29.03	Glenda Úbeda (NCA)	59:12.94	Gissel Rodríguez (PAN)	63:45.84
High jump	Kashani Ríos (PAN)	1.84 CR	Alejandra Gómez (CRC)	1.60	Ana María Martínez (PAN)	1.60
Pole vault	María José Rodas (GUA)	2.90	Meelany Jaén (PAN)	2.20		
Long jump	Tricia Flores (BIZ)	5.67	Nathalee Aranda (PAN)	5.41	Estefany Cruz (GUA)	5.40
Triple jump	Estefany Cruz (GUA)	12.08	Shantel Swift (BIZ)	11.53	Jéssica Sánchez (CRC)	11.34
Shot put	Gisela Henríquez (PAN)	12.32	Aixa Middleton (PAN)	11.63	Silvia Piñar (CRC)	11.51
Discus throw	Aixa Middleton (PAN)	43.71	Silvia Piñar (CRC)	37.87	Génova Arias (CRC)	37.42
Hammer throw	Ana Harry (HON)	41.87	Marisol Zeledón (NCA)	41.00	Silvia Piñar (CRC)	39.84
Javelin throw	Dalila Rugama (NCA)	48.59	Rocío Navarro (PAN)	40.70	Génova Arias (CRC)	40.05
Heptathlon	Ana María Porras (CRC)	4715 CR	Ruth Eugenia Morales (GUA)	4285	Katy Sealy (BIZ)	4201

== Medal table (unofficial) ==
* Host nation (Nicaragua)

Rank	Nation	Gold	Silver	Bronze	Total
1	Costa Rica	12	14	13	39
2	Panama	12	9	4	25
3	Guatemala	6	5	7	18
4	Nicaragua*	5	4	5	14
5	Honduras	4	4	4	12
6	Belize	3	5	5	13
7	El Salvador	2	3	4	9
Totals (7 entries)		44	44	42	130

== Team trophies ==
Costa Rica won the overall team trophy and the team trophy in the men's category. Panama won the team trophy in the women's category

=== Total ===
The host country is highlighted in lavender blue

Rank	Nation	Points
1st place, gold medalist(s)	Costa Rica	127
2nd place, silver medalist(s)	Panama	103
3rd place, bronze medalist(s)	Guatemala	58
4	Nicaragua	48
5	Belize	43
5	Honduras	43
7	El Salvador	23

=== Male ===
The host country is highlighted in lavender blue

Rank	Nation	Points
1st place, gold medalist(s)	Costa Rica	68
2nd place, silver medalist(s)	Guatemala	45
3rd place, bronze medalist(s)	Panama	32
4	Honduras	28
5	Nicaragua	24
6	Belize	17
7	El Salvador	4

=== Female ===
The host country is highlighted in lavender blue

Rank	Nation	Points
1st place, gold medalist(s)	Panama	71
2nd place, silver medalist(s)	Costa Rica	59
3rd place, bronze medalist(s)	Belize	26
4	Nicaragua	24
5	Honduras	19
6	El Salvador	15
7	Guatemala	13
