= Andrés Rodríguez (sprinter) =

Panamanian sprinter

Andrés Rodríguez (born 27 June 1985) is a Panamanian male track and field sprinter who competes in the 200 metres and 400 metres. He holds personal bests of 21.30 seconds and 47.02 seconds, respectively. He is the shared holder of two Panamanian national records, having set 4 × 100 metres relay and 4 × 400 metres relay records in 2007.

He has represented his country four times at the South American Championships in Athletics and twice at the Central American and Caribbean Games. He has also participated at the World Youth Championships in Athletics and the World Junior Championships in Athletics. He has won multiple medals at Central American level, including a 400 m gold medal in 2008.

== International competitions ==
Year	Competition	Venue	Position	Event	Notes
2001	World Youth Championships	Debrecen, Hungary	5th (sf)	200 m	21.50
2002	World Junior Championships	Kingston, Jamaica	5th (h)	200 m	23.54
2002	South American Youth Championships	Asunción, Paraguay	3rd	100 m	11.13
2003	Central American Junior Championships	San José, Costa Rica	2nd	200 m	21.99
2003	Central American Junior Championships	San José, Costa Rica	1st	400 m	48.67
2003	South American Junior Championships	Guayaquil, Ecuador	3rd	100 m	10.79
2004	World Junior Championships	Grosseto, Italy	3rd (sf)	400 m	47.42
2005	Central American Junior Championships	Managua, Nicaragua	2nd	100 m	10.85
2005	Central American Junior Championships	Managua, Nicaragua	2nd	200 m	22.07
2006	Central American and Caribbean Games	Cartagena, Colombia	6th (h)	400 m	49.49
2006	Central American and Caribbean Games	Cartagena, Colombia	5th (h)	4 × 400 m relay	3:17.05
2007	ALBA Games	Caracas, Venezuela	2nd	4 × 100 m relay	40.07
2007	South American Championships	São Paulo, Brazil	5th	4 × 100 m relay	40.13
2008	Central American Championships	San Pedro Sula, Honduras	1st	400 m	47.59
2010	Central American Games	Panama City, Panama	8th	400 m	51.28
2010	Central American Games	Panama City, Panama	2nd	4 × 400 m relay	3:21.74
2011	South American Championships	Buenos Aires, Argentina	5th	200 m	21.54
2011	CAC Championships	Mayagüez, Puerto Rico	4th (h)	200 m	21.30
2012	Ibero-American Championships	Barquisimeto, Venezuela	5th (h)	200 m	21.19
2012	Central American Championships	Managua, Nicaragua	2nd	200 m	21.35
2012	Central American Championships	Managua, Nicaragua	2nd	4 × 100 m relay	42.45
2013	Central American Games	San José, Costa Rica	4th	100 m	10.81
2013	Central American Games	San José, Costa Rica	—	4 × 100 m relay	DNF
2013	Central American Championships	Managua, Nicaragua	2nd	100 m	10.67
2013	Central American Championships	Managua, Nicaragua	1st	4 × 100 m relay	41.6
2013	South American Championships	Cartagena, Colombia	5th (h)	100 m	10.88
2013	South American Championships	Cartagena, Colombia	8th	200 m	21.75
2013	Bolivarian Games	Trujillo, Peru	6th	100 m	10.72
2013	Bolivarian Games	Trujillo, Peru	6th	200 m	21.60
2014	Central American and Caribbean Games	Xalapa, Mexico	7th	200 m	21.50
2015	South American Championships	Lima, Peru	5th (h)	100 m	11.00
2015	South American Championships	Lima, Peru	5th (h)	200 m	22.11
2015	Central American Championships	Managua, Nicaragua	3rd	200 m	21.07
