= 2010 Central American Championships in Athletics =

XXI Central American Championships in Athletics
- Dates: September 17–18
- Host city: Guatemala City, Guatemala
- Venue: Estadio Mateo Flores
- Level: Senior
- Events: 40 (20 men, 20 women)
- Participation: 7 nations

The 21st Central American Championships in Athletics were held at the Estadio Mateo Flores in Guatemala City, Guatemala, between September 17–18, 2010.

A total of 40 events were contested, 20 by men and 20 by women.

== Medal summary ==
Complete results and medal winners were published.

=== Men ===
Event	Gold		Silver		Bronze	
100 metres (wind: NWI)	Cruz Rolando Palacios (HON)	10.73	Alberto Perriman (PAN)	10.89	Rober Trigueño (GUA)	10.91
200 metres (wind: -2.2 m/s)	Cruz Rolando Palacios (HON)	21.92	Alberto Perriman (PAN)	21.98	Jorge Luis Jiménez (CRC)	22.08
400 metres	Takeshi Fujiwara (ESA)	47.33	Luis Hassan (PAN)	48.45	Pedro Miguel Suazo (HON)	49.33
800 metres	Jenner Pelicó (GUA)	1:56.00	Irving Sánchez (PAN)	1:57.17	Roberto Rodríguez (ESA)	1:58.45
1500 metres	Jenner Pelicó (GUA)	4:02.39	Erick Rodríguez (NCA)	4:04.71	Esdras Ixcaquic (GUA)	4:11.85
5000 metres	Alfredo Arévalo (GUA)	14:49.91	José Carlos Raxón (GUA)	14:54.53	Jeremías Saloj (GUA)	15:18.01
10,000 metres	José Amado García (GUA)	32:06.26	Jeremías Saloj (GUA)	32:07.69	José Francisco Chávez (CRC)	32:15.71
110 metres hurdles (wind: -2.1 m/s)	Ronald Bennett (HON)	14.58	Luis Carlos Bonilla (GUA)	15.18	Kennet Henry (GUA)	15.39
400 metres hurdles^{†}	Pedro Miguel Suazo (HON)	55.25	Stiven Navarrete (GUA)	55.45	Kennet Henry (GUA)	58.99
3000 metres steeplechase^{†}	Erick Rodríguez (NCA)	9:55.86	Miguel Chan (GUA)	9:57.38	Dolman Barrios (GUA)	10:07.54
4 x 100 metres relay	Honduras; Cruz Rolando Palacios; Ronald Bennett; Josef Norales; Pedro Miguel Suazo	42.02	Panama; Alberto Perriman; Luis Hassan; Jonathan Romero; Benigno Ortega	42.71	El Salvador; Takeshi Fujiwara; Marlon Colorado; Juan Francisco Cuellar; Antonio Flamenco	43.17
4 x 400 metres relay	Honduras; Cruz Rolando Palacios; Ronald Bennett; Pedro Miguel Suazo; Kessel Campbell	3:20.84	Panama; Alberto Perriman; Irving Sánchez; Luis Hassan; Jonathan Romero	3:21.83	El Salvador; Takeshi Fujiwara; Roberto Rodríguez; Juan Francisco Cuellar; Walter Lara	3:23.54
20,000 metres track walk	Allan Segura (CRC)	1:26:44.45	Mario Bran (GUA)	1:27:14.10	Jaime Daniel Quiyuch (GUA)	1:31:54.72
High jump	Marlon Colorado (ESA)	2.03	Luis Carlos Bonilla (GUA)	1.90	Byron Nolberto (GUA)	1.80
Long jump	Kessel Campbell (HON)	7.39 (wind: 0.8 m/s)	Jonathan Romero (PAN)	7.19 (wind: 0.7 m/s)	Chemaikel Ramírez (CRC)	7.17 (wind: 1.8 m/s)
Triple jump	Jason Castro (HON)	15.26 (wind: 2.0 m/s)	Juan Carlos Nájera (GUA)	15.06 (wind: 0.6 m/s)	Seilik Emeterio Gamboa (GUA)	14,18 (wind: 0.7 m/s)
Shot put	Luis Folgar (GUA)	14.48	Edson Monzón (GUA)	14.23	Juan José Alvarez (HON)	14.07
Discus throw	Raúl Rivera (GUA)	43.88	Winston Campbell (HON)	43.85	Juan Galdámez (ESA)	43.59
Javelin throw	Javier Ugarte (NCA)	64.61	Benigno Ortega (PAN)	60.51	Mario Membreño (HON)	44.16
Decathlon	Rolando Ayala (ESA)	4960	Josué Noriega (GUA)	4486	Osby Gutiérrez (GUA)	4237

==== Note ====
^{†}: Event with no points for the team trophy contest because of the low number of participants.

=== Women ===
Event	Gold		Silver		Bronze	
100 metres (wind: -2.7 m/s)	Kaina Martínez (BIZ)	12.55	Tricia Flores (BIZ)	12.72	Michelle Zúñiga (GUA)	12.74
200 metres (wind: NWI)	Kaina Martínez (BIZ)	25.54	Mardel Alvarado (PAN)	25.66	Yelena Alvear (PAN)	25.81
400 metres	Andrea Ferris (PAN)	54.73 CR	Sharolyn Scott (CRC)	55.54	Ana Lucía Hurtado (GUA)	57.78
800 metres	Andrea Ferris (PAN)	2:08.78 CR	Ana Lucía Hurtado (GUA)	2:16.80	Yolide Solís (CRC)	2:19.29
1500 metres^{†}	Andrea Ferris (PAN)	4:37.18	Cecilia Gutiérrez (GUA)	4:59.34	Evonne Marroquín (GUA)	5:00.61
5000 metres	María Ferris (PAN)	18:50.98	Norma Rodríguez (CRC)	18:56.37	Imelda Bac (GUA)	19:26.98
10,000 metres^{†}	Norma Rodríguez (CRC)	38:56.92				
100 metres hurdles (wind: 0.2 m/s)	Jeimy Bernárdez (HON)	14.63	Claudia Marisol Villeda (GUA)	15.98	Migdalia Morgan (PAN)	16.52
400 metres hurdles^{†}	Sharolyn Scott (CRC)	61.53	Bessy Flores (ESA)	69.67	Iris Santamaría (ESA)	72.75
3000 metres steeplechase	Evonne Marroquín (GUA)	11:29.86	María Ferris (PAN)	11:54.97	Aldy Villalobos (NCA)	12:10.28
4 x 100 metres relay	Costa Rica; Mariela Leal; Cindy Sibaja; Tatiana Zamora; Sharolyn Scott	48.48	Panama; Mardel Alvarado; Yelena Alvear; Migdalia Morgan; Kashani Ríos	49.46	Belize; Tricia Flores; Kaina Martínez; Charnelle Enríquez; Kay-De Vaughn	50.75
4 x 400 metres relay	Panama; Mardel Alvarado; Yelena Alvear; Andrea Ferris; María Ferris	4:01.72	Belize; Kaina Martínez; Tricia Flores; Charnelle Enríquez; Kay-De Vaughn	4:27.26		
High jump	Kashani Ríos (PAN)	1.70	Kay-De Vaughn (BIZ)	1.60	María Gabriela Carrillo (ESA)	1.55
Long jump	Tricia Flores (BIZ)	5.89 CR (wind: NWI)	Cindy Sibaja (CRC)	5.58 (wind: NWI)	Kaina Martínez (BIZ)	5.48 (wind: NWI)
Triple jump	Ana Lucía Camargo (GUA)	12.04 (wind: -0.2 m/s)	Cindy Sibaja (CRC)	11.46 (wind: 1.5 m/s)	Thelma Fuentes (GUA)	11.15 (wind: -0.5 m/s)
Shot put	Doroty López (GUA)	12.85	Aixa Middleton (PAN)	11.46	Silvia Piñar (CRC)	11.24
Discus throw	Doroty López (GUA)	45.53 CR	Aixa Middleton (PAN)	44.27	Silvia Piñar (CRC)	34.48
Hammer throw	Silvia Piñar (CRC)	40.30	Elena Lojo (PAN)	38.96	Stephanie Zúñiga (CRC)	25.48
Javelin throw	Dalila Rugama (NCA)	46.84	Lorena Medina (ESA)	38.43	Sofía Alonso (GUA)	34.14
Heptathlon^{†}	Ruth Morales (GUA)	4043	Andrea Melgar (ESA)	3475	Yizel Méndez (GUA)	2891

==== Note ====
^{†}: Event with no points for the team trophy contest because of the low number of participants.

== Medal table (unofficial) ==
* Host nation (Guatemala)

Rank	Nation	Gold	Silver	Bronze	Total
1	Guatemala (GUA)*	11	13	17	41
2	Honduras (HON)	9	1	3	13
3	Panama (PAN)	6	14	2	22
4	Costa Rica (CRC)	5	4	7	16
5	El Salvador (ESA)	3	3	6	12
6	Belize (BIZ)	3	3	2	8
7	Nicaragua (NIC)	3	1	1	5
Totals (7 entries)		40	39	38	117

=== Note ===
^{†}: The unofficial medal count is almost in agreement with the published one. The difference of 10 bronze medals for Costa Rica (7 in the unofficial count compared to 17 published) is most probably a typo.

== Team trophies ==
Guatemala won the overall team trophy.

=== Total ===
The host country is highlighted in lavender blue

Rank	Nation	Points
1st place, gold medalist(s)	Guatemala	118
2nd place, silver medalist(s)	Panama	67
3rd place, bronze medalist(s)	Costa Rica	52
4	Honduras	50
5	El Salvador	32
6	Belize	24
7	Nicaragua	18
