= 2013 Central American Championships in Athletics =

XXIV Central American Championships in Athletics
- Dates: June 21–23
- Host city: Managua, Nicaragua
- Venue: Estadio de Atletismo del Instituto Nicaragüense de Deportes
- Level: Senior
- Events: 43 (22 men, 21 women)
- Participation: 7 nations
- Records set: 3

The 24th Central American Championships in Athletics were held at the Estadio de Atletismo del Instituto Nicaragüense de Deportes in Managua, Nicaragua, between June 21–23, 2013.

A total of 43 events were contested, 22 by men and 21 by women.

== Medal summary ==
Complete results and medal winners were published.

=== Men ===
Event	Gold		Silver		Bronze	
100 metres (wind: -1.6 m/s)	Cruz Rolando Palacios (HON)	10.57	Andrés Rodríguez (PAN)	10.67	Mateo Edward (PAN)	10.77
200 metres (wind: +2.7 m/s)	Cruz Rolando Palacios (HON)	21.20 w	Gary Robinson (CRC)	21.34 w	Brandon Jones (BIZ)	21.65 w
400 metres	Nery Brenes (CRC)	46.67	Jarlex Lynch (CRC)	47.81	Joel Zamar Linch (PAN)	47.85
800 metres	Wilson Solano (CRC)	1:53.59	Víctor Emilio Ortiz (CRC)	1:54.00	David Benjamen Hodgson (CRC)	1:54.41
1500 metres	Georman Rivas (CRC)	3:57.21	Erick Rodríguez (NCA)	3:59.75	Wilson Solano (CRC)	4:01.97
5000 metres	José Francisco Chávez (CRC)	14.51.11	Dimas Castro (NCA)	15.00.29	Georman Rivas (CRC)	15.02.85
10,000 metres	Jose Francisco Chávez (CRC)	31:27.18	William Sánchez (ESA)	31:51.36	Dimas Castro (NCA)	32:12.01
110 metres hurdles (wind: -3.4 m/s)	Ronald Bennett (HON)	14.51	Gerber Blanco (GUA)	15.61	Camilo González (PAN)	16.66
400 metres hurdles	Kenneth Medwood (BIZ)	51.42	Gerald Drummond (CRC)	52.55	Gerber Blanco (GUA)	54.07
3000 metres steeplechase	Erick Rodríguez (NCA)	9:37.51	Douglas Aguilar (ESA)	9:48.59	David Alexander Escobar (ESA)	10:08.02
4 x 100 metres relay	(Panama) Panamá; Mateo Edward; Iván Lu; Juan Mosquera; Andrés Rodríguez	41.6 (ht)	Costa Rica; Jorge Luis Jiménez; Jaymar Hardy; Gary Robinson; Denovan Hernández	41.6 (ht)	Belize; Brandon Jones; Linford Avila; Mark Anderson; Kenneth Medwood	42.6 (ht)
4 x 400 metres relay	Costa Rica; Gary Robinson; Gerald Drummond; Jarlex Lynch; Nery Brenes	3:13.40	Nicaragua; Daniel Alemán; José Benjamín Veliz; Humberto Lugo; Lenín Vanegas	3:17.69	(Panama) Panamá; Andrés Rodríguez; Iván Lu; Jorge Mena; Joel Zamar Linch	3:18.13
20 Kilometres Road Walk	Allan Segura (CRC)	1:33:40.28	Mauricio Calvo (CRC)	1:34:36.80	Salvador Ernesto Mira (ESA)	1:35:43.46
High jump	Henry Edmon (PAN)	2.05	Williams Ríos (PAN)	2.00	William Figueroa (CRC)	1.85
Pole vault	Alejandro Rafael Melara (ESA)	3.80	Mario Meza (CRC)	3.80	Josue Berrocal (CRC)	3.70
Long jump	Jason Castro (HON)	7.31 (wind: -0.1 m/s)	Juan Mosquera (PAN)	7.25 (wind: -0.8 m/s)	Rolando Pinzón (PAN)	6.98 (wind: +0.4 m/s)
Triple jump	Brandon Jones (BIZ)	15.93 (wind: -0.3 m/s) CR	Jason Castro (HON)	15.58 (wind: +0.7 m/s)	Juan Mosquera (PAN)	14.04 (wind: -0.8 m/s)
Shot put	Roberto Sawyers (CRC)	15.10	Juan José Álvarez (HON)	13.98	Frederick Arias (CRC)	12.95
Discus throw	Ever Acajabon (GUA)	43.12	Alberto Peralta (PAN)	41.18	Kairo Martínez (NCA)	39.73
Hammer throw	Roberto Sawyers (CRC)	69.45 CR	Diego Berríos (GUA)	58.09	Kairo Martínez (NCA)	47.45
Javelin throw	Jonathan Cedeño (PAN)	57.68	Rider Jiménez (NCA)	57.47	Javier Ugarte (NCA)	57.20
Decathlon	Jorge Mena (PAN)	5656	Edwin Campos (CRC)	5466	Mario Alejandro Mancia (ESA)	5314

=== Women ===
Event	Gold		Silver		Bronze	
100 metres (wind: +2.1 m/s)	Ruth-Cassandra Hunt (PAN)	11.81 w	Shantely Scott (CRC)	11.99 w	Sharolyn Joseph (CRC)	12.10 w
200 metres (wind: +3.2 m/s)	Ruth-Cassandra Hunt (PAN)	24.08 w	Shantely Scott (CRC)	24.32 w	Glenda Davis (CRC)	24.89 w
400 metres	Sharolyn Scott (CRC)	55.78	Dessiré Bermúdez (CRC)	56.47	Kianeth Galván (PAN)	57.29
800 metres	Gladys Landaverde (ESA)	2:11.12	Karol Montoya (CRC)	2:18.03	María Fernanda Aguilar (CRC)	2:18.34
1500 metres	Gladys Landaverde (ESA)	4:31.49	Mónica Vargas (CRC)	4:43.97	María Fernanda Aguilar (CRC)	4:52.23
5000 metres	Ana Catalina Skipton (CRC)	18:08.62	Xiomara Barrera (ESA)	18:09.70	Mónica Vargas (CRC)	18:18.45
10,000 metres	Xiomara Barrera (ESA)	39:04.88	Ana Catalina Skipton (CRC)	39:33.17	Jaqueline Murillo (CRC)	39:49.81
100 metres hurdles (wind: -0.3 m/s)	Ana María Porras (CRC)	14.50	Kaila Smith (PAN)	14.56	Beatriz Flamenco (ESA)	14.98
400 metres hurdles	Sharolyn Scott (CRC)	59.78	Kaila Smith (PAN)	62.44	Daniela Rojas (CRC)	64.20
3000 metres steeplechase	Candy Salazar (CRC)	11:40.30	Aldy Jimena González (HON)	12:30.63	Xiomara Alemán (ESA)	13:23.99
4 x 100 metres relay	Costa Rica; Glenda Davis; Shantely Scott; Sharolyn Joseph; Sarita Morales	47.54 CR	Nicaragua; Ana Granados; Karlyn Weed; Ingrid Narváez; Hellen Soledad Toledo	51.82		
4 x 400 metres relay	Costa Rica; Dessiré Bermúdez; Sharolyn Scott; Karol Montoya; Shantely Scott	3:50.03	(Panama) Panamá; Gabriela Guevara; Kianeth Galván; Kaila Smith; Leyka Archibold	3:50.84	Nicaragua; María Inaly Morazán; Ingrid Narváez; Karlyn Weed; Ana Granados	4:24.99
10 Kilometres Road Walk	Cristina Esmeralda López (ESA)	47:47.62	Maritza Poncio (GUA)	50:06.54	Sonia Irene Barrondo (GUA)	51:08.49
High jump	Kashani Ríos (PAN)	1.80	Ana María Porras (CRC); Ana María Martínez (PAN)	1.60		
Long jump	Ana María Porras (CRC)	5.86 (wind: -0.9 m/s)	Nathalee Aranda (PAN)	5.79 (wind: -3.1 m/s)	Thelma Fuentes (GUA)	5.39 (wind: -1.1 m/s)
Triple jump	Thelma Fuentes (GUA)	11.76 (wind: -1.3 m/s)	Ana María Martínez (PAN)	11.73 (wind: -0.8 m/s)	Lilian Koo (PAN)	11.48 (wind: +0.0 m/s)
Shot put	Aixa Middleton (PAN)	12.28	Natyan Catano (PAN)	12.25	Gloria Serano (BIZ)	11.34
Discus throw	Aixa Middleton (PAN)	49.71 CR	Haydee Grijalba (CRC)	41.56	Silvia Piñar (CRC)	39.66
Hammer throw	Dagmar Alvarado (PAN)	46.85	Elena Lojo (PAN)	43.30	Viviana Abarca (CRC)	41.48
Javelin throw	Dalila Rugama (NCA)	50.61	Genova Arias (CRC)	41.56	Haydee Grijalba (CRC)	36.23
Heptathlon	Ruth Morales (GUA)	4303	María Inaly Morazán (NCA)	4114	María Gabriela Carrillo (ESA)	4011

== Medal table (unofficial) ==
* Host nation (Costa Rica)

Rank	Nation	Gold	Silver	Bronze	Total
1	Costa Rica*	17	17	16	50
2	Panama	10	12	8	30
3	El Salvador	5	3	6	14
4	Honduras	4	3	0	7
5	Guatemala	3	3	3	9
6	Nicaragua	2	6	5	13
7	Belize	2	0	3	5
Totals (7 entries)		43	44	41	128

== Team trophies ==
Costa Rica won the team trophies in all three categories.

=== Total ===
The host country is highlighted in lavender blue

Rank	Nation	Points
1st place, gold medalist(s)	Costa Rica	181.5
2nd place, silver medalist(s)	(Panama) Panamá	109.5
3rd place, bronze medalist(s)	El Salvador	43
4	Nicaragua	41
5	Guatemala	32
6	Honduras	30
7	Belize	19

=== Male ===
The host country is highlighted in lavender blue

Rank	Nation	Points
1st place, gold medalist(s)	Costa Rica	83
2nd place, silver medalist(s)	(Panama) Panamá	50
3rd place, bronze medalist(s)	Honduras	27
4	Nicaragua	24
5	Belize	17
6	Guatemala	15
7	El Salvador	14

=== Female ===
The host country is highlighted in lavender blue

Rank	Nation	Points
1st place, gold medalist(s)	Costa Rica	98.5
2nd place, silver medalist(s)	(Panama) Panamá	59.5
3rd place, bronze medalist(s)	El Salvador	29
4	Nicaragua	17
4	Guatemala	17
6	Honduras	3
7	Belize	2

== Participation ==
An unofficial count yields the participation of about 226 athletes from 7 countries:

- Belize (7)
- Costa Rica (64)
- El Salvador (30)
- Guatemala (22)
- Honduras (11)
- Nicaragua (44)
- (Panama) Panamá (48)
