= Mayra Herrera =

Guatemalan race walker

Personal information
- Full name: Mayra Carolina Herrera Pérez
- Born: 20 December 1988 (age 37) Guatemala City, Guatemala
- Height: 1.58 m (5 ft 2 in)
- Weight: 55 kg (121 lb)

Sport
- Country: Guatemala
- Event: Race walking
- Updated on 6 January 2015

Mayra Carolina Herrera Pérez (born 20 December 1988) is a Guatemalan race walker. She competed in the 20 km kilometres event at the 2012, 2016 and 2020 Summer Olympics.

== Personal bests ==
=== Road walk ===
- 10 km: 45:47 min – London, United Kingdom, 11 August 2012
- 20 km: 1:30:41 hrs – Taicang, China, 3 May 2014

== Achievements ==
| Year | Competition | Venue | Position | Event | Notes |
Representing the Guatemala
| 2003 | Central American Youth Championships | San José, Costa Rica | 1st | 4000 m track walk | 21:15.40 |
| 2004 | Central American Youth Championships | San José, Costa Rica | 2nd | 4000 m track walk | 22:28.18 |
| 2005 | Pan American Race Walking Cup - Junior | Lima, Peru | 12th | 10 km | 51:23 |
| 2005 | Pan American Race Walking Cup - Junior | Lima, Peru | 5th | Team (10 km Junior) | 25 pts |
| 2005 | Central American Junior Championships | Managua, Nicaragua | 1st | 5000 m track walk | 26:18.35 |
| 2007 | Central American Race Walking Cup - Junior | Guatemala City, Guatemala | 1st | 10 km | 54:52 |
| 2007 | Central American Junior Championships | San Salvador, El Salvador | 1st | 10,000 m track walk | 53:31.75 |
| 2012 | World Race Walking Cup | Saransk, Russia | 25th | 20 km | 1:34:46 |
| 2012 | Olympic Games | London, United Kingdom | 46th | 20 km | 1:35:33 |
| 2013 | World Championships | Moscow, Russia | 14th | 20 km | 1:30:59 |
| 2013 | Bolivarian Games | Trujillo, Peru | 8th | 20 km | 1:40:05 |
| 2014 | South American Race Walking Championships | Cochabamba, Bolivia | 5th | 20 km | 1:39:01 |
| 2014 | World Race Walking Cup | Taicang, China | 28th | 20 km | 1:30:41 |
| 2014 | World Race Walking Cup | Taicang, China | 8th | Team (20 km) | 104 pts |
| 2014 | Central American and Caribbean Games | Xalapa, Mexico | 5th | 20 km | 1:40:51 A |
| 2015 | Pan American Race Walking Cup | Arica, Chile | 12th | 20 km | 1:38:53 |
| 2015 | Pan American Race Walking Cup | Arica, Chile | 2nd | Team (20 km) | 21 pts |
| 2015 | World Championships | Beijing, China | 39th | 20 km | 1:39:23 |
