= Nicole Carboni =

Costa Rican American model, athlete and television personality

Nicole Marie Carboni Renault (born May 16, 1991) is a Costa Rican-American fashion model, television show host, beauty queen and athlete. Carboni is of French descent on her mother's side.

== Career ==
Carboni started her modeling career locally at age five, modeling for Baby Guess. At age six, Carboni debuted as an international model. Eventually, her modeling career led her to participating in beauty contests, and she won the 2006 Miss Teen World Costa Rica pageant, as well as the Miss Teenager Costa Rica contest in 2010. She also won the Miss International Golden 2013 contest, and the Miss WBC (a minor contest sponsored by the World Boxing Council) title in 2015, as well as the 2017 Miss Miami USA and Miss South Florida USA contests.

=== Major beauty pageants participation ===
On August 7, 2015, Carboni placed second on the Miss Costa Rica Universe pageant. She later made some controversial comments about the contest, posting on Facebook that the contest was rigged and that she believed the next winner would be Elena Correa, a fellow Costa Rican model who at the time of her comments was involved in a romantic relationship with Costa Rican businessman Carlos Rodriguez, some 40 years Correa's senior. She also accused the contest's producer, television channel Teletica, of fixing the contest so that those candidates favored by the channel won it, saying that Teletica practiced what she referred to as "social prostitution".

Correa eventually won the Miss Costa Rica contest, but in 2017.

Carboni, who has dual American and Costa Rican citizenship, participated in the 2017 Miss Florida contest. She did not qualify among the top 15 finalists in this contest.

=== Athletics ===
Carboni won the gold medal at the Heptathlon competition at the 2009 Central American Junior and Youth Championships in Athletics in San Salvador, El Salvador.

==== Bodybuilding career ====
Carboni spent eight months residing in Mexico during 2014, hoping to do well in the Musclemania Prestige contest, and in September 2014, she won the contest's "Sport Model Femenino" category, winning a gold medal at Mexico City's Teatro de la Juventud. With this, she was able to appear on an issue of the Mexican bodybuilding magazine, "Fisico y Fitness".

Carboni also caused some controversy after this contest, alleging that some Mexican participants felt discomfort after her win since, according to Carboni, they expected to be chosen as winners instead of her, because of their nationality. She did not mention any specific contestants, however.

Nicole Carboni also won gold medals at the same contest's Puebla and Veracruz versions.

== Further controversies ==
On April 2, 2019, Carboni went live on national television in Costa Rica, on a show named "Divas Pero Divinas" and declared that the 2014 Miss Costa Rica Universe winner, Karina Ramos, had only won that pageant because she was, according to Carboni, sleeping with Teletica's president, René Picado. Ramos sued Carboni but on April 10, it was announced that the courts had ruled in favor of Carboni, because her comment was done in a country where there is freedom of speech.

Carbobi's allegations were similar to the ones she had done in 2015 concerning another model, Elena Correa and businessman Carlos Rodriguez.

=== Disappearance of Allison Bonilla Vazquez ===
During March 4, 2020, an 18-year-old named Allison Pamela Bonilla Vázquez disappeared without a trace. Carboni got involved in the news of the disappearance when she declared that Bonilla Vázquez had both a boyfriend and a lover and that Carboni considered the man she alleges was her lover to be the main suspect. She added that she hoped her body gets found and the murderer gets executed, so that Bonilla Vázquez's family got a "soon and fair resolution". Bonilla Vázquez's mother Yendry Vázquez answered by criticizing Carboni for what Vazquez alleged is an attempt at gaining further public attention by Carboni, declaring "What argument does she have to say that about my daughter? A person with feelings would not say that. God bless her".

In October 2020, Bonilla Vázquez's remains were discovered.

== Personal ==
She has a son named Odin Zeus López Carboni, who was born in 2016.

Nicole Carboni as of 2020 resided in Mexico.
