= Marcela González Salas =

Mexican politician (1947–2023)

- Born: 18 November 1947; Mexico City, Mexico
- Died: 22 April 2023 (aged 75)
- Occupation: Politician
- Political party: PRI (1973–2003; 2009–2023); PRD (2003–2009)

María Marcela González Salas Petriccioli (18 November 1947 – 22 April 2023) was a Mexican politician affiliated, at different times, with both the Institutional Revolutionary Party (PRI) and the Party of the Democratic Revolution (PRD).

She was elected to the Chamber of Deputies on two occasions: in the 1985 mid-terms (53rd Congress) for the State of Mexico's 30th district on the PRI ticket, and in the 2003 mid-terms (59th Congress) as a plurinominal deputy for the PRD.

González Salas died from cancer on 22 April 2023, at the age of 75. At the time of her death she was serving as the State of Mexico's secretary of culture and tourism.
