= Carlos Abaunza =

Nicaraguan sprinter (born 1986)

Personal information
- Nationality: Nicaraguan
- Born: 11 January 1986 (age 40) San José, Costa Rica

Sport
- Sport: Sprinting
- Event: 100 metres

Carlos Rodolfo Abaunza Balladares (born 11 January 1986) is a Nicaraguan sprinter. He competed in the men's 100 metres at the 2004 Summer Olympics.
