= List of flag bearers for Belize at the Olympics =

Belize at the Olympics
- IOC code: BIZ
- NOC: Belize Olympic and Commonwealth Games Association
- Website: belizeolympic.org
- Medals: Gold 0 Silver 0 Bronze 0 Total 0

Summer appearances
- 1968; 1972; 1976; 1980; 1984; 1988; 1992; 1996; 2000; 2004; 2008; 2012; 2016; 2020; 2024

This is a list of flag bearers who have represented Belize at the Olympics.

Flag bearers carry the national flag of their country at the opening ceremony of the Olympic Games.

#	Event year	Season	Flag bearer	Sport
1	1968	Summer		
2	1972	Summer	Gilmore Hinkson	Official
3	1976	Summer		
4	1984	Summer	Lindford Gillitt	Cycling
5	1988	Summer	Fitzgerald Joseph	Cycling
6	1992	Summer		
7	1996	Summer	Eugène Muslar	Athletics
8	2000	Summer	Emma Wade	Athletics
9	2004	Summer	Emma Wade	Athletics
10	2008	Summer	Jonathan Williams	Athletics
11	2012	Summer	Kenneth Medwood	Athletics
12	2016	Summer	Brandon Jones	Athletics
13	2020	Summer	Samantha Dirks	Athletics
13	2020	Summer	Shaun Gill	Athletics
14	2024	Summer	Shaun Gill	Athletics

== See also ==
- Belize at the Olympics
