= List of Belizean records in athletics =

The following are the national records in athletics in Belize maintained by its national athletics federation: Belize Athletic Association (BAA).

== Outdoor ==
Key to tables: Awaiting ratification Record not kept by BAA Not ratified or later rescinded by BAA

=== Men ===
Event	Record	Athlete	Date	Meet	Place	Ref.
100 m	10.41 (+1.3 m/s)	Jayson Jones	19 April 2008		Clermont, United States	
200 m	21.14 (+1.6 m/s)	Jayson Jones	24 May 2008		Clermont, United States	
200 m	20.70 (+1.8 m/s) (Note: irregular timing)	Jayson Jones	13 June 2008		Miami, United States	
400 m	47.42	Benjamin Fairweather	9 May 2015		Utica, United States	
800 m	1:52.33 (Note: by World Athletics statistic handbook; 1:52.3 h by World Athletics Athlete Profile)	Jonathan Williams (Note: Jonathan Williams changed affiliation from USA to Belize on 1 Juny 2006)	8 March 2008		Walnut, United States	
1500 m	3:56.35	Adrian Jorgenson	23 May 1998		Richmond, United States	
3000 m	8:35.52	Patrick Fuller	20 March 2004		Eugene, United States	
5000 m	14:22.93	Patrick Fuller	22 April 2005		Eugene, United States	
10,000 m	34:32.59	Christopher Pinelo	13 March 2015		Los Angeles, United States	
Marathon	2:22:01	Patrick Fuller	8 February 2003		Birmingham, United States	
110 m hurdles	13.90 (+0.6 m/s)	Jonathan Williams (Note: Jonathan Williams changed affiliation from USA to Belize on 1 Juny 2006)	21 March 2009 (Note: by World Athletics statistic handbook; 20 March 2009 by World Athletics Athlete Profile)	California Relays	Norwalk, United States	
400 m hurdles	48.88	Jonathan Williams (Note: Jonathan Williams changed affiliation from USA to Belize on 1 Juny 2006)	14 July 2007		San Salvador, El Salvador	
3000 m steeplechase	9:59.77	Novian Middleton	26 March 2016		Rock Hill, United States	
High jump	2.03 m	Joel Wade	17 August 1997		Belize City, Belize	
Pole vault	3.20 m	Joel Wade	21 January 1994		San Salvador, El Salvador	
Long jump	7.76 m NWI	Michael McKoy	16 August 1998	Central American and Caribbean Games	Maracaibo, Venezuela	
Triple jump	16.22 m (−1.9 m/s)	Brandon Jones	19 June 2016	Central American Championships	San Salvador, El Salvador	
Shot put	14.49 m	Khambrell Gómez	27 April 2012	South Coast Conference Prelims/Finals	Compton, United States	
Discus throw	41.11 m	Khambrell Gómez	16 April 2011	Beach Invitational	Norwalk, United States	
Hammer throw						
Javelin throw	51.93 m	Arlen Kyle Pou	17 June 2012		Managua, Nicaragua	
Decathlon	5920 h (Note: 6032 pts sourced by World Athletics Profile)	Michael McKoy	9–10 December 1997		San Pedro Sula, El Salvador	
Decathlon	100m / Long jump / Shot put / High jump / 400m / 110m H / Discus / Pole vault / Javelin / 1500m; 10.9 / 7.15 m / 9.58 m / 1.83 m / 52.4 / 17.2 / 29.48 m / 2.90 m / 34.64 m / 4:37.6					
20 km walk (road)						
50 km walk (road)						
4 × 100 m relay	41.16	Belize; Rahin Monsanto; Brandon Jones; Mark Anderson; Shaun Gill	11 December 2017	Central American Games	Managua, Nicaragua	
4 × 400 m relay	3:16.80	Belize; Michael McKoy; Joel Wade; Jayson Jones; Elston Albert Shaw	13 December 1997	Central American Games	San Pedro Sula, Honduras	

=== Women ===
Event	Record	Athlete	Date	Meet	Place	Ref.
100 m	11.46 (+1.3 m/s)	Kaina Martínez	25 May 2017	NCAA Women's Division II Championships	Bradenton, United States	
200 m	22.98 (+1.7 m/s)	Emma Wade	28 May 2004		Gainesville, United States	
400 m	53.19	Samantha Dirks	30 April 2016	Steve Scott Invitational	Irvine, United States	
400 m	53.19	Samantha Dirks	16 May 2015	Big West Championships	Riverside, United States	
800 m	2:05.33	Sharette Garcia	25 April 1992		Irvine, United States	
1500 m	4:29.29	Sharette Garcia	17 April 1992	Mt. SAC Relays	Walnut, United States	
3000 m	10:13.5 h	Sharette Garcia	17 February 1996		Long Beach, United States	
5000 m	19:40.28	Melissa Henderson	3 June 2005		San José, Costa Rica	
5000 m	19:13.01 Mx	Mallory Meyers	23 October 2022	Garden State Showcase #1	Piscataway, United States	
10,000 m						
Marathon	3:05:13	Melissa Henderson	15 January 2006	Houston Marathon	Houston, United States	
100 m hurdles	14.35 (+0.7 m/s)	Alexia Neal	1 May 2015	CAA Championships	Williamsburg, United States	
400 m hurdles	1:02.28	Alexia Neal	18 April 2015	Georgia Tech Invitational	Atlanta, United States	
3000 m steeplechase	14:58.69	Ashontie Carr	12 April 2019		Kingston, Jamaica	
High jump	1.73 m	Katy Sealy (Note: Katy Sealy transferred from Great Britain to Belize on 9 June 2010)	13 July 2018		Guatemala City, Guatemala	
Pole vault	2.63 m	Stephaun Martínez	12 March 2011		Tallahassee, United States	
Long jump	6.34 m (±0.0 m/s)	Brooklyn Lyttle	22 June 2025	New Balance Nationals	Philadelphia, United States	
Triple jump	12.79 m NWI	Althea Gilharry-Moses	4 May 1996		Los Angeles, United States	
Shot put	16.20 m	Itohan Aikhionbare	16 July 2016	NACAC Under-23 Championships	San Salvador, El Salvador	
Discus throw	47.40 m	Itohan Aikhonbare	19 June 2016		San Salvador, El Salvador	
Hammer throw						
Javelin throw	39.20 m (Note: record set during heptathlon competition)	Katy Sealy (Note: Katy Sealy transferred from Great Britain to Belize on 9 June 2010)	10 December 2017		Managua, Nicaragua	
Heptathlon	4817 pts	Katy Sealy (Note: Katy Sealy transferred from Great Britain to Belize on 9 June 2010)	17–18 June 2016	Central American Championships	San Salvador, El Salvador	
Heptathlon	100m H / High jump / Shot put / 200m / Long jump / Javelin / 800m; 15.46 (+0.7 m/s) / 1.68 m / 11.10 m / 27.09 (−0.3 m/s) / 5.48 m (−0.1 m/s) / 35.61 m / 2:35.78					
20 km walk (road)						
50 km walk (road)						
4 × 100 m relay	46.61	Belize; Faith Morris; Kaina Martinez; Tricia Flores; Samantha Dirks	18 June 2016	Central American Championships	San Salvador, El Salvador	
4 × 400 m relay	4:01.32	Belize; Samantha Dirks; Tricia Flores; Ashantie Carr; Ashontie Carr	12 December 2017	Central American Games	Managua, Nicaragua	

== Indoor ==
=== Men ===
Event	Record	Athlete	Date	Meet	Place	Ref.
60 m	6.82	Brandon Jones	13 February 2009		Landover, United States	
200 m	21.54	Brandon Jones	8 March 2009	IC4A/ECAC Championships	Boston, United States	
400 m	50.35	Brandon Jones	10 December 2010		Princess Anne, United States	
400 m	48.21 A OT	Kenneth Medwood	31 January 2016		Flagstaff, United States	
800 m						
1500 m						
3000 m						
60 m hurdles						
High jump						
Pole vault						
Long jump	7.19	Brandon Jones	11 January 2024	Fairfax Father Diamond Invitational	Fairfax, United States	
Triple jump	15.84 m	Brandon Jones	30 January 2016	BU John Thomas Terrier Classic	Boston, United States	
Shot put						
Heptathlon						
Heptathlon	60m / Long jump / Shot put / High jump / 60m H / Pole vault / 1000m					
5000 m walk						
4 × 400 m relay						

=== Women ===
Event	Record	Athlete	Date	Meet	Place	Ref.
60 m	7.46	Samantha Dirks	31 January 2021	KMS Open	Birmingham, United States	
200 m	23.72	Kaina Martinez	26 February 2017	Boston University Last Chance	Boston, United States	
300 m	38.26	Samantha Dirks	6 February 2021	East Coast Invitational	Virginia Beach, United States	
400 m	55.37 A	Kaina Martinez	21 February 2016		Alamosa, United States	
400 m	55.19 OT	Kaina Martinez	11 March 2016	NCAA Division II Championships	Pittsburg, United States	
400 m	54.11	Lydia Troupe	23 February 2024		Boston, United States	
800 m	2:14.79	Shantel Sabrina Swift	26 February 2015		Birmingham, United States	
1500 m						
3000 m	11:04.13	Mallory Meyers	9 January 2022	Ocean Breeze Invitational	Staten Island, United States	
60 m hurdles	9.04	Alexia Neal	29 January 2016	Bob Pollock Invitational	Clemson, United States	
High jump	1.71 m	Katy Sealy	20 December 2015		London, United Kingdom	
Pole vault	2.13 m	Kay-De Vaughn	23 February 2008		Ypsilanti, United States	
Long jump	5.88 m A	Kaina Martinez	19 February 2017	Lone Star Championships	Alamosa, United States	
Long jump	6.25 m	Brooklyn Lyttle	3 March 2024	PVA Youth Indoor	Landover, United States	
Triple jump	12.11 m	Kay-De Vaughn	6 March 2010		Johnson City, United States	
Shot put	11.44 m	Katy Sealy	5 March 2017		London, United Kingdom	
Pentathlon	3621 pts	Katy Sealy	20 December 2015		London, United Kingdom	
Pentathlon	60m H / High jump / Shot put / Long jump / 800m; 9.23 / 1.71 m / 10.74 m / 5.42 m / 2:34.58					
3000 m walk						
4 × 400 m relay						
