= Belize at the 1988 Summer Olympics =

- IOC code: BIZ
- NOC: Belize Olympic and Commonwealth Games Association

in Seoul
- Competitors: 10 men in 2 sports
- Flag bearer: Fitzgerald Joseph
- Medals: Gold 0 Silver 0 Bronze 0 Total 0

Summer Olympics appearances (overview)
- 1968; 1972; 1976; 1980; 1984; 1988; 1992; 1996; 2000; 2004; 2008; 2012; 2016; 2020; 2024

Belize was represented at the 1988 Summer Olympics in Seoul, South Korea by the Belize Olympic and Commonwealth Games Association.

In total, 10 athletes – all men – represented Belize in two different sports including athletics and cycling.

== Competitors ==
In total, 10 athletes represented Belize at the 1988 Summer Olympics in Seoul, South Korea across two different sports.

| Sport | Men | Women | Total |
|---|---|---|---|
| Athletics | 5 | 0 | 5 |
| Cycling | 5 | 0 | 5 |
| Total | 10 | 0 | 10 |

== Athletics ==
In total, five Belizean athletes participated in the athletics events – Ian Gray in the men's 5,000 m, Devon Hyde in the Triple jump, Eugène Muslar and Polin Belisle in the men's marathon and Carlton Usher in the men's 400 m.

The heats for the men's 400 m took place on 24 September 1988. Usher finished eighth in his heat in a time of 51.42 seconds and he did not advance to the quarter-finals.

The heats for the men's 5,000 m took place on 28 September 1988. Gray finished 17th in his heat in a time of 15 minutes 33.24 seconds and he did not advance to the semi-finals.

The men's marathon took place on 2 October 1988. Muslar completed the course in two hours 43 minutes 29 seconds to finish 79th overall.

| Athlete | Event | Heat | | Quarterfinal | | Semifinal | | Final | |
| Athlete | Event | Result | Rank | Result | Rank | Result | Rank | Result | Rank |
|---|---|---|---|---|---|---|---|---|---|
| Carlton Usher | 400 m | 51.42 | 8 | did not advance | | | | | |
| Ian Gray | 5,000 m | 15:33.24 | 17 | n/a | | did not advance | | | |
| Eugène Muslar | Marathon | n/a | | | | | | 2:43.29 | 79 |
| Polin Belisle | Marathon | n/a | | | | | | 3:14.02 | 98 |

The qualifying round for the men's triple jump took place on 23 September 1988. Hyde contested qualifying group A. His best jump of 14.09 m came on his third and final attempt but it was ultimately not far enough to advance to the final and he finished 40th overall.

| Athlete | Event | Qualification | | Final | |
| Athlete | Event | Distance | Position | Distance | Position |
|---|---|---|---|---|---|
| Devon Hyde | Triple jump | 14.09 | 39 | did not advance | |

== Cycling ==
In total, five Belizean athletes participated in the cycling events – Fitzgerald Joseph, Charles Lewis, Michael Lewis, Paul Réneau and Earl Theus.

The men's team time trial took place on 18 September 1988. Belize did not finish.

The men's road race took place on 27 September 1988. Neither Joseph, Michael Lewis nor Theus finished the race.

| Athlete | Event | Time | Rank |
|---|---|---|---|
| Fitzgerald Joseph | Road race | DNF | |
| Michael Lewis | Road race | DNF | |
| Earl Theus | Road race | DNF | |
| Fitzgerald Joseph; Charles Lewis; Michael Lewis; Earl Theus | Men's team time trial | DNF | |

The qualifying round of the men's sprint took place on 21 September 1988. Réneau recorded a time of 11.732 seconds and was ranked 20th. The first round took place later the same day. Réneau finished third in his race and transferred to the repechage. The first round of the repechage took place later the same day. Réneau finished third in his race and was eliminated from the competition.

| Cyclist | Event | Qualifying round | | First round | | First repechage | | Second round | | Second repechage | | Quarterfinals | | Semifinals | | Final | |
| Cyclist | Event | Result | Rank | Result | Rank | Result | Rank | Result | Rank | Result | Rank | Result | Rank | Result | Rank | Result | Rank |
|---|---|---|---|---|---|---|---|---|---|---|---|---|---|---|---|---|---|
| Paul Réneau | Sprint | 11.732 | 20 | Unknown | 3 | Unknown | 3 | did not advance | | | | | | | | | |
