= Belize at the 1992 Summer Olympics =

- IOC code: BIZ
- NOC: Belize Olympic and Commonwealth Games Association

in Barcelona
- Competitors: 10 (9 men, 1 woman) in 2 sports
- Medals: Gold 0 Silver 0 Bronze 0 Total 0

Summer Olympics appearances (overview)
- 1968; 1972; 1976; 1980; 1984; 1988; 1992; 1996; 2000; 2004; 2008; 2012; 2016; 2020; 2024

Belize competed at the 1992 Summer Olympics in Barcelona, Spain. Ten competitors, nine men and one woman, took part in ten events in two sports.

== Competitors ==
The following is the list of number of competitors in the Games.

Sport	Men	Women	Total
Athletics	5	0	5
Cycling	4	1	5
Total	9	1	10

== Athletics ==
Men
Track & road events

Athlete	Event	Heat		Quarterfinal		Semifinal		Final	
Athlete	Event	Result	Rank	Result	Rank	Result	Rank	Result	Rank
Emery Paul Gill	100 m	11.51	75	did not advance					
Ian Gray	1500 m	DNF		did not advance					
Michael Joseph	400 m	50.90	6	did not advance					
John Palacio	800 m	DSQ		did not advance					
Emery Paul Gill; Elston Shaw; Michael Joseph; John Palacio	4 × 100 m	DSQ		did not advance					

Field events

Athlete	Event	Qualification		Final	
Athlete	Event	Distance	Position	Distance	Position
Elston Shaw	Long jump	6.57	44	did not advance	
Elston Shaw	Triple jump	13.56	44	did not advance	

== Cycling ==
Five cyclists, four men and one woman, represented Belize in 1992.

=== Road ===
Men

Athlete	Event	Time	Rank
Douglas Lamb	Road race	DNF	
Michael Lewis	Road race	DNF	
Ernest Meighan	Road race	DNF	
Orlando Chavarria; Douglas Lamb; Michael Lewis; Ernest Meighan	Men's team time trial	2:42:38	27

Women

Athlete	Event	Time	Rank
Camille Solis	Women's road race	DNF	
