= 2015 Central American Championships in Athletics =

XXVI Central American Championships in Athletics
- Dates: June 26–28
- Host city: Managua, Nicaragua
- Venue: Estadio de Atletismo del Instituto Nicaragüense de Deportes
- Level: Senior
- Events: 44 (22 men, 22 women)
- Participation: 192 + 8 guest athletes from 7 + 1 guest nations
- Records set: 7

The 26th Central American Championships in Athletics were held at the Estadio de Atletismo del Instituto Nicaragüense de Deportes in Managua, Nicaragua, between June 26–28, 2015.

A total of 44 events were contested, 22 by men and 22 by women. In total, 7 championships records were set. The new men's 400m mark (45.33 by Nery Brenes) was established in the heat. El Salvador won the overall team trophy.

== Medal summary ==
Complete results were published.

=== Men ===
Event	Gold		Silver		Bronze	
100 metres (wind: +0.5 m/s)	Cruz Rolando Palacios; Honduras	10.44	Mateo Edward; Panama	10.49	Josef Norales; Honduras	10.52
200 metres (wind: +6.4 m/s)	Gary Alexander Robinson; Costa Rica	20.93 w	Cruz Rolando Palacios; Honduras	21.01 w	Andrés Rodríguez; Panama	21.07 w
400 metres	Nery Brenes; Costa Rica	45.43	Jarlex Lynch; Costa Rica	47.98	César Vásquez; Costa Rica	48.47
800 metres	Joseph Acevedo; Panama	1:54.92	Jeffri Arcia; Nicaragua	1:55.78	Álvaro Vásquez; Nicaragua	1:57.04
1500 metres	Georman Rivas; Costa Rica	3:54.00	Erick Rodríguez; Nicaragua	3:54.23	Álvaro Vásquez; Nicaragua	3:59.79
5000 metres	Álvaro Sanabria; Costa Rica	15:12.76	Gustavo Mora; Costa Rica	15:18.81	Williams Sánchez; El Salvador	15:22.47
10,000 metres	Williams Sánchez; El Salvador	33:04.54	Julio Evenezzer; Nicaragua	33:49.31	Dimas Castro; Nicaragua	34:45.16
110 metres hurdles (wind: +2.1 m/s)	Gerber Blanco; Guatemala	14.39 w	Williams Ríos; Panama	14.45 w	Luis Carlos Bonilla; Guatemala	14.50 w
400 metres hurdles	José Chorro; El Salvador	54.04	René Perla; El Salvador	55.42	Iván Lu; Panama	56.46
3000 metres steeplechase	Erick Rodríguez; Nicaragua	9:10.29	Álvaro Vásquez; Nicaragua	9:16.81	David Alexander Escobar; El Salvador	9:28.45
4 x 100 metres relay	Belize; James Bregal; Brandon Terrell Jones; Linsford Ávila; Mark Anthony Anderson	42.03	Honduras; Víctor Josué González; Cruz Rolando Palacios; Jason Daniel Castro; Josef Norales	42.47	Nicaragua; José Benjamín Véliz; Neykel Niño; Luis Fernando Alfaro; Ramón Ernesto Rizo	42.99
4 x 400 metres relay	Costa Rica; Víctor Emilio Ortiz; Gary Alexander Robinson; César Andrey Vásquez	3:13.57	El Salvador; Bryan Ramos; Fidel García; Ronald Alexis Moreno; René Perla	3:20.99	Panama; Luis Alberto Hassan; Héctor Josué González; Luis Antonio Salazar; Joseph Acevedo	3:21.25
20000 metres track walk	Gabriel Calvo; Costa Rica	1:33:30.79	Luis Alfonso López; El Salvador	1:40:54.39		
High jump	Alexander Bowen; Panama	2.15	Jaime Enrique Escobar; Panama	2.15	Henry Edmon; Panama	2.00
Pole vault	Natan Rivera; El Salvador	4.55	Pedro Daniel Figueroa; El Salvador	4.40	César Alonso Chávez; El Salvador	4.00
Long jump	Juan Mosquera; Panama	7.13 (wind: -0.7 m/s)	Becker Jarquín; Nicaragua	6.98 (wind: -2.3 m/s)	Brandon Terrell Jones; Belize	6.83 (wind: -0.9 m/s)
Triple jump	Brandon Terrell Jones; Belize	15.31 (wind: -2.4 m/s)	Jason Daniel Castro; Honduras	15.21 (wind: -0.7 m/s)	Kenneth Blackett; Belize	15.00 (wind: 0.0 m/s)
Shot put	Mario McKenzie; Costa Rica	14.96	Billy Manolo López; Guatemala	14.37	Hugo Antonio Gonzales; Guatemala	14.15
Discus throw	Winston Campbell; Honduras	50.18	Mario McKenzie; Costa Rica	48.61	Ever Acajabón; Guatemala	43.53
Hammer throw	Diego Berríos; Guatemala	60.61	Alejandro Arroyo; Costa Rica	49.78	Kairo Martínez; Nicaragua	47.22
Javelin throw	Jonathan Cedeño; Panama	65.26	Erick Méndez; Costa Rica	57.08	Benigno Ortega; Panama	54.53
Decathlon	Ronald Edyberto Ramírez; Guatemala	6164	Andre Campos; Costa Rica	5953	Alen Calderón; Nicaragua	5365

=== Women ===
Event	Gold		Silver		Bronze	
100 metres (wind: +4.2 m/s)	Yasmin Woodruff; Panama	11.45 w	Kaina Martinez; Belize	11.59 w	Sharolyn Josephs; Costa Rica	11.65 w
200 metres (wind: +5.4 m/s)	Sharolyn Josephs; Costa Rica	23.51 w	Kaina Martinez; Belize	23.60 w	Yasmin Woodruff; Panama	23.69 w
400 metres	Kianeth Galván; Panama	57.57	Sofía Carías; El Salvador	57.65	Gina Zambrana; Costa Rica	59.02
800 metres	Andrea Ferris; Panama	2:14.36	Mónica Vargas; Costa Rica	2:16.93	Brenda Salmerón; El Salvador	2:18.30
1500 metres	Andrea Ferris; Panama	4:37.42	Ana Mirta Hércules; El Salvador	4:44.29	Brenda Salmerón; El Salvador	4:45.03
5000 metres	Rosa del Toro; El Salvador	18:30.53	Xiomara Barrera; El Salvador	18:35.68	Wendy Ascencio; El Salvador	18:38.27
10,000 metres	Xiomara Barrera; El Salvador	39:10.23	Aldy González; Honduras	40:15.82	Martha Jiménez; El Salvador	43:36.74
100 metres hurdles (wind: +4.1 m/s)	Iris Santamaría; El Salvador	14.57 w	Alexia Neal; Belize	15.06 w	Naomi Priscilla Smith; Costa Rica	15.15 w
400 metres hurdles	Ana María Porras; Costa Rica	1:02.03	Leyka Archibold; Panama	1:03.65	Alexia Neal; Belize	1:06.67
3000 metres steeplechase	Andrea Ferris; Panama	10:39.19 CR	Brenda Salmerón; El Salvador	11:21.03	Josselyn Grijalva; El Salvador	11:54.81
4 x 100 metres relay^{†}	Panama; Selena Arjona; Yasmin Woodruff; Leyka Archibold; Ruth-Cassandra Hunt	47.40 CR	El Salvador; Lauren Velásquez; Iris Santamaría; Sofía Carías; Beatriz Flamenco	48.83	Costa Rica; Naomi Priscilla Smith; Sharolyn Josephs; Ana María Porras; Melanie Foulkes	49.13
4 x 400 metres relay^{‡}	Costa Rica; Sharolyn Josephs; Ana María Porras; Mónica Vargas; Gina Zambrana	3:52.77	Belize; Ashantie Carr; Alexia Neal; Kaina Martinez; Ashontie Carr	4:01.62	El Salvador; Sofía Carías; Lauren Velásquez; Brenda Salmerón; Ana Mirta Hércules	4:01.85
10,000 metres track walk	Cristina López; El Salvador	48:10.76	Yesenia Miranda; El Salvador	50:19.82	Glenda Úbeda; Nicaragua	56:47.79
High jump	Kashani Ríos; Panama	1.75	Ana María Martínez; Panama	1.66	Giuliana di Bartolo; Costa Rica	1.63
Pole vault	Andrea Velasco; El Salvador	3.35 CR	Fátima Soto; El Salvador	2.80	Fátima Aguirre; El Salvador	2.70
Long jump	Estefany Cruz; Guatemala	5.63 (wind: +0.4 m/s)	Melanie Foulkes; Costa Rica	5.25 (wind: -2.1 m/s)	Shanicka Augustine; Belize	5.06 (wind: -2.5 m/s)
Triple jump	Estefany Cruz; Guatemala	12.69 (wind: -0.1 m/s)	Thelma Fuentes; Guatemala	12.33 (wind: -1.2 m/s)	Shanicka Augustine; Belize	11.87 (wind: +0.1 m/s)
Shot put	Aixa Middleton; Panama	12.32	Naomi Priscilla Smith; Costa Rica	11.55	Katy Sealy; Belize	11.21
Discus throw	Aixa Middleton; Panama	55.00 CR	Alma Guitierrez; Honduras	40.13	Ayleen González; Panama	39.66
Hammer throw	Dagmar Alvarado; Panama	43.85	Viviana Abarca; Costa Rica	41.91	María José Soto; El Salvador	38.12
Javelin throw	Dalila Rugama; Nicaragua	48.65	Génova Arias; Costa Rica	44.56	Natasha Rodríguez; Costa Rica	37.33
Heptathlon	Katy Sealy; Belize	4614	Ruth Morales; Guatemala	4361	María Inaly Morazán; Nicaragua	3599

^{†} The women's 4x100m relay was won by the invited guest team from Puerto Rico (Beatriz Cruz, Celiangeli Morales, Dayleen Santana, Genoiska Cancel) in 44.03.
^{‡} The women's 4x400m relay was won by the invited guest team from Puerto Rico (Grace Claxton, Alethia Marrero, Paris García, Carol Rodríguez) in 3:35.71.

== Medal table (unofficial) ==
* Host nation (Nicaragua)

Rank	Nation	Gold	Silver	Bronze	Total
1	Panama (PAN)	14	5	7	26
2	Costa Rica (CRC)	10	11	7	28
3	El Salvador (ESA)	8	11	11	30
4	Guatemala (GUA)	5	3	3	11
5	Belize (BIZ)	3	4	6	13
6	Nicaragua (NIC)*	2	5	8	15
7	Honduras (HON)	2	5	1	8
Totals (7 entries)		44	44	43	131

== Team trophies ==
El Salvador won the overall team trophy.

=== Total ===
The host country is highlighted in lavender blue

Rank	Nation	Points
1st place, gold medalist(s)	El Salvador	108
2nd place, silver medalist(s)	(Panama) Panamá	106
3rd place, bronze medalist(s)	Costa Rica	101
4	Nicaragua	46
5	Belize	42
6	Guatemala	41
7	Honduras	30

=== Male ===
The host country is highlighted in lavender blue

Rank	Nation	Points
1st place, gold medalist(s)	Costa Rica	57
2nd place, silver medalist(s)	(Panama) Panamá	42
3rd place, bronze medalist(s)	El Salvador	39
4	Nicaragua	36
5	Guatemala	24
6	Honduras	23
7	Belize	15

=== Female ===
The host country is highlighted in lavender blue

Rank	Nation	Points
1st place, gold medalist(s)	El Salvador	69
2nd place, silver medalist(s)	(Panama) Panamá	64
3rd place, bronze medalist(s)	Costa Rica	44
4	Belize	27
5	Guatemala	17
6	Nicaragua	10
7	Honduras	7

== Participation ==
According to an unofficial count, 192 (+ 8 guest) athletes from 7 (+ 1 guest) countries participated.

- Belize (18)
- Costa Rica (34)
- El Salvador (41)
- Guatemala (16)
- Honduras (8)
- Nicaragua (34)
- Panama (41)

Guest country:

- Puerto Rico (8)
