= KREM New Years' Day Cycling Classic =

The KREM New Year's Day Cycling Classic is a single day road cycling race held in Belize since 1991 on New Year's Day, January 1, and is thus the first race on Belize's cycling calendar. The race was restricted to elite and junior men until 2001, when females became eligible to ride. It is considered the second most prestigious race in Belize after the Holy Saturday Cross Country Cycling Classic.

The usual route is over the Northern Highway from Corozal District (at first Corozal Town, now the Santa Elena northern border) to Belize City, finishing at the corner of Central American Boulevard and Mahogany Street, approximately two blocks from the home of the race's sponsor, Kremandala Ltd., located on Partridge Street.

== Past winners ==
Year	Winner (Male)	Winner (Female)
2017	(Belize) Ron Vasquez	(Belize) Alicia Thompson
2016	(Belize) Joel Borland	(Belize) Alicia Thompson
2015	(Mexico) Hector Hugo Rangel	(Belize) Alicia Thompson
2014	(Belize) Byron Pope	(Belize) Shalini Zabaneh
2013	(Belize) David Henderson, Jr.	(Belize) Shalini Zabaneh
2012	(Belize) Geovanni Choto	(Belize) Kaya Cattouse
2011	(Costa Rica) Marco Salas Arias	(Belize) Shalini Zabaneh
2010	(Mexico) Carlos Manuel Hernandez	(Belize) Shalini Zabaneh
2009	(Belize) Marlon Castillo	(United States) Lori Harkey
2008	(Mexico) Moe Herman Camacho	(Belize) Shalini Zabaneh
2007	(Belize) Shane Vasquez	(Belize) Gina Lovell
2006	(United States) Scottie Weiss	(Belize) Alicia Thompson
2005	(Belize) Michael Lewis	(Belize) Marinette Flowers
2004	(Belize) Marlon Castillo	(Belize) Fiona Humes Gonzalez
2003	(Belize) Douglas Lamb	(Belize) Fiona Humes Gonzalez
2002	(Belize) Barney Brown	(Belize) Ann Marie Bennett
2001	(Guatemala) Miguel Perez Laparra	(Belize) Karen Rosito
2000	(Belize) Ariel Rosado	
1999	(Belize) Ernest Meighan	
1998	(Belize) Francisco Flores	
1997	(Belize) Ian Smith	
1996	(Belize) Nigel Matus	
1995	(Belize) Fred Usher	
1994	(Belize) Douglas Lamb	
1993	(Belize) Derrick Mahler	
1992	(Belize) Francisco Flores	
1991	(Belize) Michael Lewis	
