= Owen Meighan =

Belizean long jumper

Personal information
- Nationality: Belizean
- Born: 7 February 1944 (age 82) Belize City, British Honduras

Sport
- Sport: Athletics, tennis
- Event: Long jump

Owen "Sonny" Leopoldo Meighan (born 7 February 1944) is a Belizean sports administrator, former long jumper and tennis player. Meighan was introduced to tennis in 1967, and then had won multiple national titles in singles, doubles, and mixed doubles. As part of the Belizean 1968 Summer Olympics team, he had competed in the men's long jump though did not qualify for the finals. He practiced other sports and were inducted to the Belizean Hall of Fame for baseball, basketball, and softball.

After his sporting career, he has held multiple positions in Belizean sport organizations. Meighan was the chef de mission for Belizean delegations at subsequent Summer Games, the vice president of the Belize Olympic and Commonwealth Games Association, and the presidents of two national governing bodies.

== Biography ==
Owen "Sonny" Leopoldo Meighan was born on 7 February 1944 in Belize City, British Honduras. His mother, tennis player Grace Fuller Meighan, introduced him to the sport of tennis in 1967. The following year, he was part of the first Belizean (then-British Honduras) Olympic team, competing in the men's long jump at the 1968 Summer Olympics in Mexico City, Mexico. At the preliminaries of the event on 17 October, he had fouled for his first attempt, recorded a distance of 6.06 metres for his second attempt, and again recorded a distance of 6.06 metres for his second attempt. He had placed last in the qualifications for an athlete that had a mark and did not advance to the finals. As a tennis player, he had won national titles in the men's singles, men's doubles, and mixed doubles on multiple occasions. He was also active in other sports such as basketball, volleyball, softball, and baseball.

After his sporting career, a section dedicated to him in a section about Belizean sport was held at the Museum of Belize in 2005. He was also inducted into the Belizean Hall of Fame for baseball, basketball, and softball. As a sports administrator, he was the chef de mission for Belize at the 1984 Summer Olympics and Belize at the 2012 Summer Olympics. He was also the vice president of the Belize Olympic and Commonwealth Games Association, president of the Belize Taekwondo Federation and Belize National Fencing Federation, and treasurer of the Belize Tennis Federation. Outside of sport he is a Senior Justice of the peace.
