= Belize at the 2024 Summer Olympics =

- IOC code: BIZ
- NOC: Belize Olympic and Commonwealth Games Association
- Website: www.belizeolympic.org

in Paris, France 26 July 2024 – 11 August 2024
- Competitors: 1 (1 man) in 1 sport
- Flag bearer (opening): Shaun Gill
- Flag bearer (closing): Shaun Gill
- Officials: 4
- Medals: Gold 0 Silver 0 Bronze 0 Total 0

Summer Olympics appearances (overview)
- 1968; 1972; 1976; 1980; 1984; 1988; 1992; 1996; 2000; 2004; 2008; 2012; 2016; 2020; 2024

Belize competed at the 2024 Summer Olympics in Paris, France, which were held from 26 July to 11 August 2024. The country's participation in Paris marked its fourteenth appearance at the Summer Olympics since its debut in 1968, and after boycotting the 1980 Summer Olympics.

The Belizean athlete delegation consisted of one competitor, sprinter Shaun Gill, which tied for the smallest athlete delegation of a country at these Games. Gill qualified through a universality slot given by World Athletics. He was the flagbearer for the nation at the opening ceremony and the closing ceremony. He competed in the men's 100 metres event in athletics and did not advance further from the heats. Thus, Belize has yet to win an Olympic medal.

== Background ==
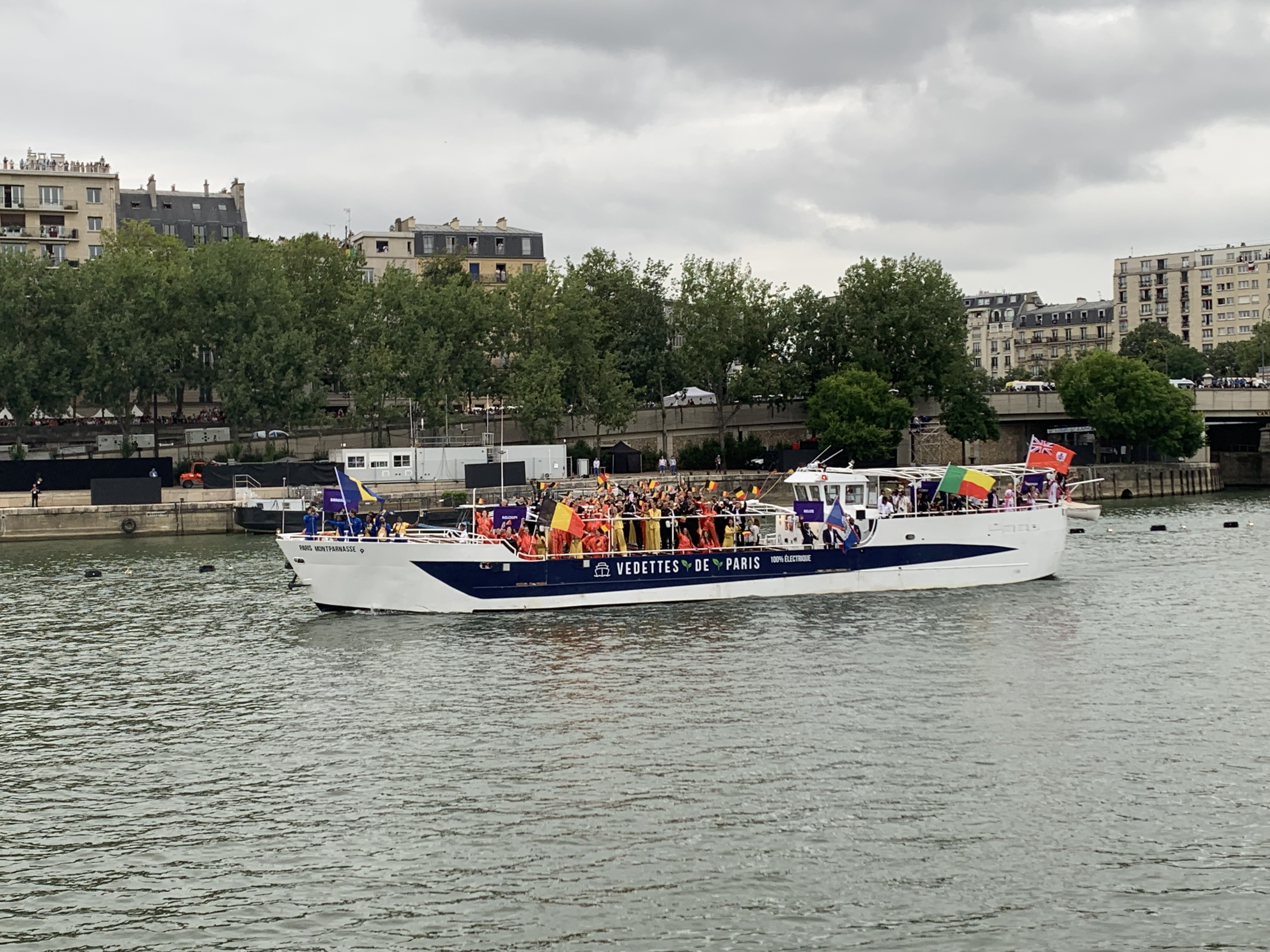
The Belizean delegation (third from right) during the opening ceremony

The Games were held from 26 July to 11 August 2024, in the city of Paris, France. This edition of the Games marked the nation's fourteenth appearance at the Summer Olympics since its debut at the 1968 Summer Olympics, and after boycotting the 1980 Summer Olympics due to the Soviet invasion of Afghanistan. The nation had never won a medal at the Olympics.

=== Delegation ===
The Belizean delegation was composed of five people. The officials present were Giovanni Alamilla, who served as the chef de mission, Hilberto "Hilly" Martinez, the president of the Belize Olympic and Commonwealth Games Association (BOCGA), Allan Sharp, the secretary general of the BOCGA, and Cojac Smith, the president of the Belize Athletic Association. A singular athlete qualified for the Games, 2020 Summer Olympian Shaun Gill, a sprinter who competed in the men's 100 metres. The nation's athlete delegation at the Games tied with Liechtenstein, Nauru, and Somalia, for the fewest athletes of a country at the Games.

=== Opening and closing ceremonies ===
The Belizean delegation came in 22nd out of the 205 National Olympic Committees in the 2024 Summer Olympics Parade of Nations within the opening ceremony. Gill held the flag for the delegation in the ceremony and was accompanied by Alamilla and Smith. At the closing ceremony, Gill also held the flag.

== Competitors ==
List of Belizean competitors at the 2024 Summer Olympics
Sport	Men	Women	Total
Athletics	1	0	1
Total	1	0	1

== Athletics ==
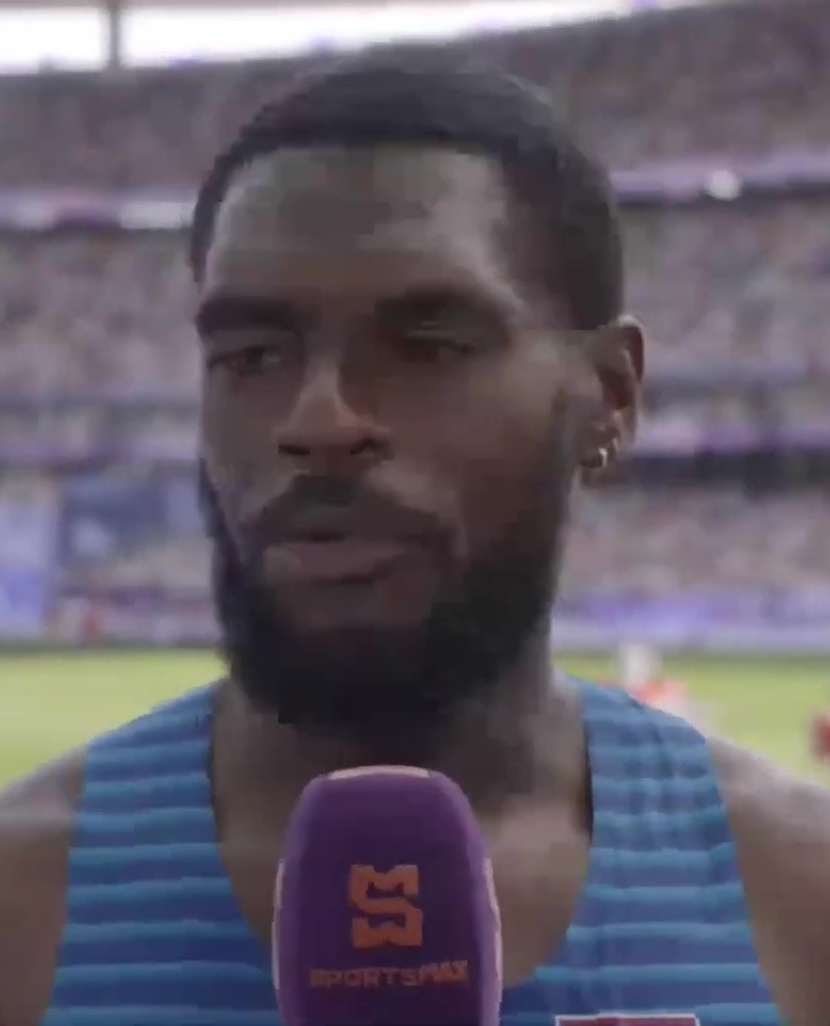
Gill during an interview after his race in the heats

The nation received a universality slot from World Athletics to send one male sprinter for the Games, which allows a National Olympic Committee to send athletes despite not meeting the standard qualification criteria. Gill was chosen by the BOCGA after being the highest ranked male sprinter in the 100 metres within the nation. With the help of athletic coach and Olympian Colin Thurton, Gill acquired an Olympic scholarship in 2023 to help with financing his training. In the lead-up to the games, he trained in Houston, United States, with coach Ryan Dall then traveled to Belize for training with coach Frederick Evans but started having pain because of the conditions of the track there, yet he could not go back to Houston due to financial issues. On 27 July 2024, he went to a training camp organized by Panam Sports for his event.

Gill competed in the preliminaries of the men's 100 metres on 3 August. He ran in the fourth heat and placed sixth out of the eight people in the round, where he finished with a time of 11.17 seconds and did not advance further, citing jet lag for his performance. Noah Lyles of the United States eventually won the gold in a time of 9.784 seconds. After Gill competed in his event, he announced his retirement and set up a GoFundMe page for funding to train younger Belizean runners, focus on his future job as an engineer, and take up a course for a master's degree in management studies at Texas A&M University–Kingsville.

Key
- Note–Ranks given for track events are within the athlete's heat only

Track & road events

Athletics summary
Athlete	Event	Preliminary		Round 1		Semifinals		Final	
Athlete	Event	Result	Rank	Result	Rank	Result	Rank	Result	Rank
Shaun Gill	Men's 100 m	11.17	6	Did not advance					

== See also ==
- Belize at the 2023 Pan American Games
- Belize at the 2022 Commonwealth Games
