= British Honduras at the 1968 Summer Olympics =

- Flag of British Honduras
- IOC code: HBR
- NOC: British Honduras Olympic and Commonwealth Games Association

in Mexico City
- Competitors: 7 in 4 sports
- Medals: Gold 0 Silver 0 Bronze 0 Total 0

Summer Olympics appearances (overview)
- 1968; 1972; 1976; 1980; 1984; 1988; 1992; 1996; 2000; 2004; 2008; 2012; 2016; 2020; 2024

British Honduras (now Belize) competed in the Summer Olympic Games for the first time at the 1968 Summer Olympics in Mexico City, Mexico. Seven competitors, all men, took part in six events in four sports.

Some speculated that the Tlatelolco massacre would discourage British Honduras's participation in the Games, but the British Honduran athletes persevered. They won no medals, however.

== Athletics ==
Men
Track & road events

Athlete	Event	Heat		Quarterfinal		Semifinal		Final	
Athlete	Event	Result	Rank	Result	Rank	Result	Rank	Result	Rank
Colin Thurton	200 m	22.14	7	did not advance					

Field events

Athlete	Event	Qualification		Final	
Athlete	Event	Distance	Position	Distance	Position
Owen Meighan	Long jump	6.06	34	did not advance	

== Cycling ==
Two cyclists represented Belize in 1968.

Track cycling

Ranks given are within the heat.

Cyclist	Event	First round		First repechage		Second round		Eighthfinals		Quarterfinals		Semifinals		Final	
Cyclist	Event	Result	Rank	Result	Rank	Result	Rank	Result	Rank	Result	Rank	Result	Rank	Result	Rank
Kenneth Sutherland	Sprint	Unknown	3 r	Unknown	2	did not advance									

Cyclist	Event	Qualifying round		Quarterfinals		Semifinals		Final	
Cyclist	Event	Result	Rank	Result	Rank	Result	Rank	Result	Rank
Denfield McNab	Individual pursuit	6:12.96	28	did not advance					

== Shooting ==
Two male shooters represented Belize in 1968.

Shooter	Event	Final	
Shooter	Event	Score	Rank
Robert Hulse	50 m rifle, prone	584	63
Edward Anderson	50 m rifle, prone	562	86

== Weightlifting ==
Athlete	Event	Press	Snatch	Clean & Jerk	Total	Rank
Mario Mendoza	Lightweight	82.5	87.5	110.0	280.0	19
