= Belize at the 1984 Summer Olympics =

- IOC code: BIZ
- NOC: Belize Olympic and Commonwealth Games Association

in Los Angeles
- Competitors: 11 (all men) in 3 sports
- Flag bearer: Lindford Gillitt
- Medals: Gold 0 Silver 0 Bronze 0 Total 0

Summer Olympics appearances (overview)
- 1968; 1972; 1976; 1980; 1984; 1988; 1992; 1996; 2000; 2004; 2008; 2012; 2016; 2020; 2024

Belize competed at the 1984 Summer Olympics in Los Angeles, United States. The nation returned to the Olympic Games after participating in the American-led boycott of the 1980 Summer Olympics. This was the first Olympic participation for Belize as an independent country. Eleven competitors, all men, took part in seven events in three sports.

== Athletics ==
Men
Track & road events

Athlete	Event	Heat		Quarterfinal		Semifinal		Final	
Athlete	Event	Result	Rank	Result	Rank	Result	Rank	Result	Rank
Paul Réneau	100 m	10.96	8	did not advance					
Damel Flowers	200 m	21.72	5	did not advance					
Phillip Pipersburg	400 m	48.04	7	did not advance					
Eugène Muslar	5000 m	15:05.78	12	n/a		did not advance			

== Boxing ==
Boxer	Weight class	Round of 64	Round of 32	Round of 16	Quarterfinals	Semifinals	Final / Bronze match	
Boxer	Weight class	Opposition Score	Opposition Score	Opposition Score	Opposition Score	Opposition Score	Opposition Score	Rank
Hugh Dyer	Bantamweight	n/a	Pitalúa (COL); L	did not advance				17T

== Cycling ==
Six cyclists represented Belize in 1984

Men

Athlete	Event	Time	Rank
Joslyn Chavarria	Road race	DNF	
Warren Coye	Road race	DNF	
Lindford Gillitt	Road race	DNF	
Wernell Reneau	Road race	DNF	
Joslyn Chavarria; Warren Coye; Kurt Cutkelvin; Merlyn Dawson	Men's team time trial	2:36:55	25
