= Belize at the 2012 Summer Olympics =

- IOC code: BIZ
- NOC: Belize Olympic and Commonwealth Games Association

in London
- Competitors: 3 in 2 sports
- Flag bearer: Kenneth Medwood
- Medals: Gold 0 Silver 0 Bronze 0 Total 0

Summer Olympics appearances (overview)
- 1968; 1972; 1976; 1980; 1984; 1988; 1992; 1996; 2000; 2004; 2008; 2012; 2016; 2020; 2024

Belize competed at the 2012 Summer Olympics in London, which were held from 27 July to 12 August 2012. The country's participation in London was its eleventh appearance in the Summer Olympics since its debut at the 1968 Summer Olympics. The delegation included two short-distance runners and one judoka: Kenneth Medwood, Kaina Martinez and Eddermys Sanchez. Medwood qualified by recording a time that met qualification standards while the latter two entered through wildcard places. Medwood was selected as the flag bearer for both the opening and closing ceremonies. Medwood reached the semifinals of the men's 400 metres hurdles before he was eliminated from competition while Martinez did not progress farther than the quarterfinal stage of the women's 100 metres. Sanchez was defeated by his opponent Miklós Ungvári of Hungary in a 19-second match in the Round of 32 of the men's half-lightweight judo competition.

== Background ==
Belize participated in eleven Summer Olympic Games between its debut at the 1968 Summer Olympics in Mexico City and the 2012 Summer Olympics in London, England, with the exception of the 1980 Summer Olympics in the Soviet Union because the country joined the United States-led boycott over the 1979 invasion of Afghanistan during the Soviet–Afghan War. Belize participated in the London Summer Olympics from 27 July to 12 August 2012. The nation's delegation was composed of sprinters Kenneth Medwood and Kaina Martinezs and judoka Eddermys Sanchez. The trio were announced by the Belize Olympic & Commonwealth Games Association on 21 February 2012, and were selected from athletes in ten sports. Along with the three athletes, the delegation consisted of chef de mission Owen Sonny Meighan, attaché Andrew Wingmore, delegate Josephine Flowers, coaches Colin Thurton and Wellington Chee, and Thomas Searle, the team's doctor. Medwood was selected as the flag bearer for both the opening and closing ceremonies.

== Athletics ==
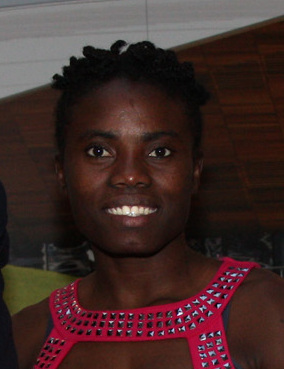
Kaina Martinez reached the quarterfinals of the women's 100 metres.

Kenneth Medwood was the youngest person to represent Belize at the London Games at age 24. He had not participated in any previous Olympic Games. Medwood qualified for the Games because his fastest time of 49.54 seconds, recorded at the Mt. San Antonio College in April 2012, was 0.26 seconds quicker the "B" qualifying standard for his event, the men's 400 metres hurdles. He competed in the event's first heat on 3 August, finishing fourth out of eight athletes, with a time of 49.78 seconds. Medwood's performance allowed him to qualify for the contest's semifinal stage as the fastest losing runner. In the semifinals the following day, he placed fifth out of eight runners, with a time of 49.87 seconds. Overall he finished 17th out of 46 runners, (Note: One athlete did not finish, four were disqualified and one did not start.) and did not advance to the final after finishing 1.92 seconds slower than the slowest qualifier. After his event, Medwood told Great Belize Television that the games were "a great experience" which were something he had anticipated but that "it was an experience in itself because I've never been to the Games."

At the age of 26, Kaina Martinez was the sole female athlete on the Belize Olympic team. She made her first appearance in the Olympic Games. Martinez qualified for the London Games because her quickest time of 11.74 seconds, set at the 2011 Central American Championships in Athletics, was 0.36 seconds slower than the "B" qualifying standard for her contest, the women's 100 metres. Before the Games she stated that she felt satisfied and attempted not to get excessive anxiety by relaxing and mediating. Martinez was drawn in the second heat in the event's preliminary stage, finishing second out of eight runners, with a time of 11.81 seconds. Her time allowed her to qualify for the first round. Overall Martinez ranked 51st out of 78 athletes (Note: One athlete, Noor Al-Malki, did not finish.) and failed to go through to the semifinal after finishing 0.81 seconds slower than the slowest qualifier in round one. Afterwards she said: "It's an awesome experience. I mean words can really describe honestly how I feel being here and being a part of the competition. I just think it's an awesome experience."

Key

- Note–Ranks given for track events are within the athlete's heat only
- Q = Qualified for the next round
- q = Qualified for the next round as a fastest loser or, in field events, by position without achieving the qualifying target
- Bye = Athlete not required to compete in round

Men

Athlete	Event	Heat		Semifinal		Final	
Athlete	Event	Result	Rank	Result	Rank	Result	Rank
Kenneth Medwood	400 m hurdles	49.78	4 q	49.87	5	Did not advance	

Women

Athlete	Event	Heat		Quarterfinal		Semifinal		Final	
Athlete	Event	Result	Rank	Result	Rank	Result	Rank	Result	Rank
Kaina Martinez	100 m	11.81	2 Q	11.89	8	Did not advance			

== Judo ==
Eddermys Sanchez Machado represented Belize in men's judo. He qualified by being awarded an invitational place by the Tripartite Commission in June 2012. Sanchez took part in the men's half-lightweight judo (66 kg) competition, which included athletes under 66 kilograms in weight. He was the oldest person to represent Belize at the London Games at the age of 32, and made his debut in the Olympic movement. Sanchez faced Miklós Ungvári of Hungary in the Round of 32 after receiving a bye and was defeated by his opponent after 19 seconds and therefore eliminated from the competition.

Athlete	Event	Round of 64	Round of 32	Round of 16	Quarterfinals	Semifinals	Repechage	Final / BM	
Athlete	Event	Opposition Result	Opposition Result	Opposition Result	Opposition Result	Opposition Result	Opposition Result	Opposition Result	Rank
Eddermys Sanchez	Men's −66 kg	Bye	Ungvári (HUN); L 0000–0010	Did not advance					
