= British Honduras at the 1972 Summer Olympics =

- Flag of British Honduras
- IOC code: HBR
- NOC: British Honduras Olympic and Commonwealth Games Association

in Munich
- Competitors: 1 in 1 sport
- Flag bearer: Gilmore Hinkson
- Medals: Gold 0 Silver 0 Bronze 0 Total 0

Summer Olympics appearances (overview)
- 1968; 1972; 1976; 1980; 1984; 1988; 1992; 1996; 2000; 2004; 2008; 2012; 2016; 2020; 2024

British Honduras (now Belize) sent a delegation to compete at the 1972 Summer Olympics in Munich, West Germany from 26 August to 11 September 1972. This was the then British territory's second appearance at a Summer Olympic Games. The delegation consisted of one sport shooter, Owen Phillips, who participated in two events. He came 59th in the 50 meter pistol and 101st in the 50 meter rifle prone.

== Background ==
The Belize Olympic and Commonwealth Games Association was recognized by the International Olympic Committee on 1 January 1968. The territory made its debut in Olympic competition later that year at the 1968 Summer Olympics and except for the boycotted 1980 Summer Olympics has appeared in every Summer Olympiad since. This made Munich the second appearance for the then British territory, which would not become independent from the United Kingdom until 1981. The 1972 Summer Olympics were held from 26 August to 11 September 1976; a total of 7,134 athletes, representing 121 National Olympic Committees took part in the Games. The British Honduran delegation to Munich consisted of one shooter, Owen Phillips. Gilmore Hinkson, a Belezian sports official, was selected as the flag-bearer for the opening ceremony.

== Shooting ==
Owen Phillips was 66 years old at the time of the Munich Olympics and making his Olympic debut. On 27 August, he took part in the 50 meter pistol competition, where he scored 376 points out of a possible 600 maximum score. This ranked him 59th and last among all competitors. The gold medal was won with 567 points by Ragnar Skanåker of Sweden, the silver medal was taken by Dan Iuga of Romania with 562 points, and the bronze was earned by Rudolf Dollinger of Austria with 560 points. The next day, he took part in the 50 meter rifle prone. Again, there was a maximum possible score of 600 points, and Phillips finished his competition with 555 points. This placed him 101st and last among all competitors. The gold medal was won with 599 points by Ri Ho-jun of North Korea, the silver was taken with 598 points by the United States' Victor Auer, and the bronze was claimed with the same 598 points by Romania's Nicolae Rotaru.

Athlete	Event	Final	
Athlete	Event	Score	Rank
Owen Phillips	50 m pistol	376	59
Owen Phillips	50 m rifle prone	555	101
