= Belize at the 2004 Summer Olympics =

- IOC code: BIZ
- NOC: Belize Olympic and Commonwealth Games Association

in Athens
- Competitors: 2 in 1 sport
- Flag bearer: Emma Wade
- Medals: Gold 0 Silver 0 Bronze 0 Total 0

Summer Olympics appearances (overview)
- 1968; 1972; 1976; 1980; 1984; 1988; 1992; 1996; 2000; 2004; 2008; 2012; 2016; 2020; 2024

Belize sent a delegation to compete at the 2004 Summer Olympics in Athens, Greece, from 13 to 29 August 2004. This was the Central American country's ninth appearance at a Summer Olympic Games. The delegation consisted of two track and field athletes: Michael Aguilar and Emma Wade; neither advanced beyond the first round of their events.

== Background ==
The Belize Olympic and Commonwealth Games Association was recognized by the International Olympic Committee on 1 January 1968. The nation made its debut in Olympic competition later that year at the 1968 Summer Olympics, and except for the boycotted 1980 Summer Olympics have appeared in every Summer Olympiad since. This made Athens their ninth appearance at a Summer Olympic Games, although they have yet to appear at any Winter Olympic Games. The 2004 Summer Olympics were held from 13 to 29 August 2004; a total of 10,625 athletes participated, representing 201 National Olympic Committees. Belize sent two track and field athletes to Athens: Michael Aguilar and Emma Wade. For the opening ceremony, Wade was selected as flag-bearer.

== Athletics ==
Emma Wade was 23 years old at the time of the Athens Olympics and had previously represented Belize at the 2000 Summer Olympics in Sydney. On 23 August, she participated in the first round heats of the women's 200 meters and was drawn into heat five. She finished her heat in 23.43 seconds, fifth out of six athletes in that heat. However, only the top four in each heat plus the next four fastest from all heats could advance, and Wade was eliminated. The gold medal was eventually won in 22.05 seconds by Veronica Campbell-Brown of Jamaica, the silver by the United States' Allyson Felix, and the bronze by Bahamian Debbie Ferguson.

Michael Aguilar was 24 years old at the time of these Olympics and was making his only Olympic appearance. On 23 August, he took part in the first round heats of the men's 400 meter hurdles and was drawn into heat three. He finished the race in 51.21 seconds, finishing seventh and last in his heat, and he was eliminated. The gold medal was eventually won in 47.63 seconds by Félix Sánchez of the Dominican Republic, the silver medal was earned by Jamaican Danny McFarlane, and the bronze was won by Frenchman Naman Keïta.

Key

- Note–Ranks given for track events are within the athlete's heat only
- N/A = Round not applicable for the event

Athlete	Event	Heat		Quarterfinal		Semifinal		Final	
Athlete	Event	Result	Rank	Result	Rank	Result	Rank	Result	Rank
Emma Wade	Women's 200 m	23.43	5	did not advance					
Michael Aguilar	Men's 400 m hurdles	51.21	7	N/A		did not advance			

== See also ==
- Belize at the 2003 Pan American Games
