= Belize at the 2020 Summer Olympics =

- Flag of Belize
- IOC code: BIZ
- NOC: Belize Olympic and Commonwealth Games Association
- Website: www.belizeolympic.org

in Tokyo, Japan July 23 – August 8, 2021
- Competitors: 3 in 2 sports
- Flag bearers (opening): Samantha Dirks; Shaun Gill
- Flag bearer (closing): Amado Cruz
- Medals: Gold 0 Silver 0 Bronze 0 Total 0

Summer Olympics appearances (overview)
- 1968; 1972; 1976; 1980; 1984; 1988; 1992; 1996; 2000; 2004; 2008; 2012; 2016; 2020; 2024

Belize competed at the 2020 Summer Olympics in Tokyo, Japan, from 23 July to 8 August 2021. It was the nation's thirteenth appearance at the Summer Olympics including its appearances in the 1968 and 1972 Games as British Honduras. The Belize team consisted of three athletes — two men and one woman — competing in two sports: athletics and canoeing. Belize did not win any medals at the Games.

== Background ==
The Belize Olympic and Commonwealth Games Association was founded in 1967 and recognized by the International Olympic Committee in the same year. The nation made its first Olympic appearance as British Honduras at the 1968 Summer Olympics in Mexico City. It was the nation's thirteenth appearance at the Summer Olympics including its appearances in the 1968 and 1972 Games as British Honduras.

The 2020 Summer Olympics were held in Tokyo, Japan, between 23 July and 8 August 2021. Originally scheduled to take place from 24 July to 9 August 2020, the Games were postponed due to the COVID-19 pandemic. For the first time, the International Olympic Committee invited each National Olympic Committee to select one female and one male athlete to jointly carry their flag during the opening ceremony. Samantha Dirks and Shaun Gill served as Belize's joint flag-bearers during the opening ceremony. Amado Cruz carried the flag during the closing ceremony. None of the three athletes won a medal in the Games.

== Competitors ==
The Belize delegation consisted of two track and field athletes, Shaun Gill and Samantha Dirks, and one canoeist, Amado Cruz.

| Sport | Men | Women | Total |
|---|---|---|---|
| Athletics | 1 | 1 | 2 |
| Canoeing | 1 | 0 | 1 |
| Total | 2 | 1 | 3 |

== Athletics ==
As per the governing body World Athletics (WA), a NOC was allowed to enter up to three qualified athletes in each individual event if the Olympic Qualifying Standards (OQS) for the respective events had been met during the qualifying period. The remaining places were allocated based on the World Athletics Rankings which were derived from the average of the best five results for an athlete over the designated qualifying period, weighted by the importance of the meet. Belize received universality places from WA to send two athletes, one male and one female, to the Games.

Shaun Gill competed in the men's 100 metres, and Samantha Dirks competed in the women's 400 metres. Both Gill and Dirks were supported by Olympic Solidarity Scholarships since 2018. Gill finished fifth in his heat with a time of 10.88 seconds and did not advance to the next round. Dirks finished seventh in her quarterfinal heats with a time of 54.16 seconds, her season's best, but did not advance to the semifinals.

Key

- Note–Ranks given for track events are within the athlete's heat only
- Q = Qualified for the next round
- q = Qualified for the next round as a fastest loser or, in field events, by position without achieving the qualifying target
- NR = National record
- N/A = Round not applicable for the event
- Bye = Athlete not required to compete in round

Track & road events

| Athlete | Event | Heat | | Quarterfinal | | Semifinal | | Final | |
| Athlete | Event | Result | Rank | Result | Rank | Result | Rank | Result | Rank |
|---|---|---|---|---|---|---|---|---|---|
| Shaun Gill | Men's 100 m | 10.88 | 5 | Did not advance | | | | | |
| Samantha Dirks | Women's 400 m | —N/a | | 54.16 SB | 7 | Did not advance | | | |

== Canoeing ==
Belize received an invitation from the Tripartite Commission to send a canoeist to the Games, marking the country's debut in Olympic canoeing. Amado Cruz became the first athlete from Belize to compete in Canoeing at the Summer Olympics. He started paddling at the age of five and began kayaking in 2016. He trained under Spanish coach Foad Buchta Mohamed at Seville, Spain, ahead of the Games.

Cruz competed in the men's K-1 200 metres and men's K-1 1000 metres events held at the Sea Forest Waterway. In the K-1 200 m, he finished fifth in both the preliminary heat and quarterfinals, and did not advance further. In the K-1 1000 m, he finished fifth in his preliminary heat with a time of 4:13.080, and sixth in the quarterfinals with 4:15.262, and did not advance to the semifinals.

Canoe sprint

| Athlete | Event | Heats | | Quarterfinals | | Semifinals | | Final | |
| Athlete | Event | Time | Rank | Time | Rank | Time | Rank | Time | Rank |
|---|---|---|---|---|---|---|---|---|---|
| Amado Cruz | Men's K-1 200 m | 39.645 | 5 QF | 39.333 | 5 | Did not advance | | | |
| Amado Cruz | Men's K-1 1000 m | 4:13.080 | 5 QF | 4:15.262 | 6 | Did not advance | | | |

Qualification Legend: FA = Qualify to final (medal); FB = Qualify to final B (non-medal)

== See also ==
- Belize at the 2016 Summer Olympics
- Belize at the 2024 Summer Olympics
