= Belize at the 2000 Summer Olympics =

- IOC code: BIZ
- NOC: Belize Olympic and Commonwealth Games Association

in Sydney
- Competitors: 2 in 1 sport
- Flag bearer: Emma Wade
- Medals: Gold 0 Silver 0 Bronze 0 Total 0

Summer Olympics appearances (overview)
- 1968; 1972; 1976; 1980; 1984; 1988; 1992; 1996; 2000; 2004; 2008; 2012; 2016; 2020; 2024

Belize sent a delegation to compete at the 2000 Summer Olympics in Sydney, Australia from 15 September to 1 October 2000. This was Belize's eighth appearance at a Summer Olympic Games. The delegation sent by Belize consisted of two track and field competitors: Jayson Jones and Emma Wade. Neither advanced beyond the first round heats of their events.

== Background ==
The Belize Olympic and Commonwealth Games Association was recognized by the International Olympic Committee on 1 January 1968. The nation made its debut in Olympic competition later that year at the 1968 Summer Olympics, and except for the boycotted 1980 Summer Olympics has appeared in every Summer Olympiad since. This made Sydney their eighth appearance at a Summer Olympic Games, although they have yet to appear at any Winter Olympic Games. As of the 2016 Summer Olympics, Belize has yet to win its first Olympic medal. The 2000 Summer Olympics were held from 15 September to 1 October 2000; a total of 10,651 athletes represented 199 National Olympic Committees. The Belize delegation to Sydney consisted of two track and field competitors: Emma Wade and Jayson Jones. Wade was selected as the flag-bearer for the opening ceremony, a duty she would reprise four years later in Athens.

== Competitors ==
The following is the list of number of competitors in the Games.

Sport	Men	Women	Total
Athletics	1	1	2
Total	1	1	2

== Athletics ==
Emma Wade was 19 years old at the time of the Sydney Olympics, was making her Olympic debut, and would later go on to represent Belize at the 2004 Summer Olympics in Athens. On 23 September, she was drawn into the third heat of the women's 100 meters. She finished the race in 12.25 seconds, which was seventh out of eight competitors in her heat, and Wade was eliminated. In the event overall, the gold medal is vacant due to original gold medalist Marion Jones of the United States admitting to steroid use and forfeiting her medals and results from the Sydney Games. Officially, the medals in the event are held by Ekaterini Thanou of Greece and Tayna Lawrence (the original bronze medalist) of Jamaica sharing silver, and Merlene Ottey, also of Jamaica, the original fourth-place finisher, being awarded a bronze. Gold was left vacant because Thanou, the original silver medalist, had her own issue with missing a drug test at the 2004 Summer Olympics.

Jayson Jones was 23 years old at the time of these Olympics, and was also making his Olympic debut; he would later represent Belize at the 2008 Summer Olympics. On 27 September he took part in the first round of the men's 200 meters, and was drawn into heat one. He finished the heat in a time of 22.20 seconds, seventh and last in his heat, and he was eliminated. Gold was eventually won in 20.09 seconds by Konstantinos Kenteris of Greece, the silver was earned by Darren Campbell of Great Britain, and the bronze was taken by Ato Boldon of Trinidad and Tobago.

Athlete	Event	Heat		Quarterfinal		Semifinal		Final	
Athlete	Event	Result	Rank	Result	Rank	Result	Rank	Result	Rank
Emma Wade	Women's 100 m	12.25	7	did not advance					
Jayson Jones	Men's 200 m	22.20	7	did not advance					

- Note–Ranks given for track events are within the athlete's heat only
