= Belize at the 1976 Summer Olympics =

- IOC code: BIZ
- NOC: Belize Olympic and Commonwealth Games Association

in Montreal Canada
- Competitors: 4 in 2 sports
- Medals: Gold 0 Silver 0 Bronze 0 Total 0

Summer Olympics appearances (overview)
- 1968; 1972; 1976; 1980; 1984; 1988; 1992; 1996; 2000; 2004; 2008; 2012; 2016; 2020; 2024

Belize competed at the 1976 Summer Olympics in Montreal, Quebec, Canada. Previously, the nation had competed as British Honduras. Four competitors, all men, took part in four events in two sports.

== Athletics ==
Men
Track & road events

Athlete	Event	Heat		Quarterfinal		Semifinal		Final	
Athlete	Event	Result	Rank	Result	Rank	Result	Rank	Result	Rank
Errol Thurton	400 m	48.91	7	did not advance					
Colin Thurton	100 m	11.03	7	did not advance					

== Shooting ==
Two male shooters represented British Honduras in 1976.

Open

Athlete	Event	Final	
Athlete	Event	Score	Rank
John Waight	50 m pistol	419	47
Owen Phillips	50 metre rifle prone	544	78
