= Mario Mendoza (disambiguation) =

Mario Mendoza (Mario Mendoza Aizpuru, born 1950) is a Mexican baseball player and manager.

Mario Mendoza may also refer to:

- Mario Mendoza (boxer) (born 1938), Guatemalan bantamweight
- Mario Mendoza Cortés (1968–2007), Mexican politician from Puebla
- Mario Mendoza (weightlifter) (born 1943), represented British Honduras as a lightweight
- Mario Mendoza Zambrano (born 1964), Colombian writer and academic
