= Belize at the 2016 Summer Olympics =

- IOC code: BIZ
- NOC: Belize Olympic and Commonwealth Games Association

in Rio de Janeiro
- Competitors: 3 in 2 sports
- Flag bearer: Brandon Jones
- Medals: Gold 0 Silver 0 Bronze 0 Total 0

Summer Olympics appearances (overview)
- 1968; 1972; 1976; 1980; 1984; 1988; 1992; 1996; 2000; 2004; 2008; 2012; 2016; 2020; 2024; 2028

Belize competed at the 2016 Summer Olympics in Rio de Janeiro, Brazil, from 5 to 21 August 2016. It was the nation's twelfth appearance at the Olympic Games, although it had previously appeared in two early editions under the name "British Honduras" (1968 in Mexico City, and 1972 in Munich). Belize joined the United States-led boycott of the 1980 Summer Olympics hosted in Moscow, Russia. The delegation included two track and field athletes: Brandon Jones and Katy Sealy, as well as judoka Renick James. All three athletes made their Olympic debut. Belize Olympic and Commonwealth Games Association appointed 200 metres sprinter Brandon Jones to carry the nation's flag in the opening ceremony. Belize, however, has yet to win its first Olympic medal.

== Background ==
Belize participated in twelve Summer Olympics between its debut in the 1968 Summer Olympics in Mexico City, Mexico, and the 2016 Summer Olympics in Rio de Janeiro, Brazil. The highest number of Belizeans participating at any single Summer Games was 11 in the 1984 Summer Olympics in Los Angeles, United States. No Belizean has ever won a medal at the Olympics. All of the Belizean participants competed at the Games through wildcard slots from the International Association of Athletics Federations and the International Judo Federation. Brandon Jones was chosen to be Belize's flag bearer during the parade of nations of the opening ceremony and the closing ceremony.

== Athletics (track and field) ==
Belize received a universality invitation from the IAAF to send two athletes (one male and one female) to the Olympics. This marked both Brandon Jones's and Katy Sealy's Olympic debuts. Jones participated in the men's 200 m and Sealy in the women's 100 m hurdles. Brandon Jones finished 8th in his heat with a time of 21.49 seconds, achieving his season's best but failing to qualify for the semifinals. Katy Sealy came 7th in her heat with a time of 15.79 seconds and was unable to qualify for the semifinals. The runner behind her, Mulern Jean, was disqualified due to violating rule 168.7b which states that a competitor must not "deliberately" knock down any hurdle."

Key

- Note–Ranks given for track events are within the athlete's heat only
- Q = Qualified for the next round
- q = Qualified for the next round as a fastest loser or, in field events, by position without achieving the qualifying target
- NR = National record
- N/A = Round not applicable for the event
- Bye = Athlete not required to compete in round

Track & road events

| Athlete | Event | Heat | | Semifinal | | Final | |
| Athlete | Event | Result | Rank | Result | Rank | Result | Rank |
|---|---|---|---|---|---|---|---|
| Brandon Jones | Men's 200 m | 21.49 SB | 8 | did not advance | | | |
| Katy Sealy | Women's 100 m hurdles | 15.79 | 7 | did not advance | | | |

== Judo ==
Belize received a universality invitation from the Tripartite Commission to send a judoka competing in the men's middleweight category (90 kg) to the Olympics. This was Renick James's Olympic debut. James received a bye past the first round of 64. He then lost 100-000 in the round of 32 against Ovini Uera of Nauru.

| Athlete | Event | Round of 64 | Round of 32 | Round of 16 | Quarterfinals | Semifinals | Repechage | Final / BM | |
| Athlete | Event | Opposition Result | Opposition Result | Opposition Result | Opposition Result | Opposition Result | Opposition Result | Opposition Result | Rank |
|---|---|---|---|---|---|---|---|---|---|
| Renick James | Men's −90 kg | Bye | Uera (NRU); L 000–100 | did not advance | | | | | |

== See also ==
- Belize at the 2015 Pan American Games
