= Belize Basketball Federation =

The Belize Basketball Federation (BBF) is the governing body for basketball in Belize and is a member of FIBA. The BBF is a nonprofit organization that officially represents Belize in the sport of basketball. It consists of nine district and school associations across Belize and manages all national teams. The league is affiliated with the Belize Olympic and Commonwealth Games Association and the National Sports Council of Belize.

== Purpose ==
The Belize Basketball Federation was originally created as the Belize Amateur Basketball Association in 1927 to organize national junior and senior male and female competitions. Its purpose is to assist and oversee the activities of local teams and organizations to ensure that the sport is conducted according to international basketball regulations and standards, so that teams, as well as individual players, are able to compete effectively at regional and international levels. The league's mission statement is: "To grow and develop all aspects of basketball in Belize through collaboration, inclusion, proper organization, and full accountability."

== Member organizations ==
- Corozal Basketball Association (CBA)
- Orange Walk District Basketball Association (OWDBA)
- Belize District Basketball Association
- Belmopan Basketball Association (BBA)
- San Ignacio and Santa Elena Basketball Association (SSBA)
- Dangriga Basketball Association (DBA)
- Association of Tertiary Level Institutions in Belize (ATLIB)
- National Secondary School Sports Association (NSSSA)
- Belize Association of Basketball Officials (BABO)

== See also ==
- Belize national basketball team
