= Andrea Michelle Velasco Barrera =

Salvadoran pole vaulter (born 1997)

Michelle Velasco
Personal information
- Born: July 17, 1997 (age 28)

Sport
- Country: El Salvador
- Sport: Pole Vault
Medal record
Central American Championships in Athletics
Gold medal – first place	2014 Tegucigalpa	Pole Vault
Gold medal – first place	2015 Managua	Pole Vault
Gold medal – first place	2017 Tegucigalpa	Pole Vault
Gold medal – first place	2018 Guatemala City	Pole Vault
Gold medal – first place	2019 Managua	Pole Vault

Andrea Michelle Velasco Barrera (born Jul 17, 1997) is a Salvadoran pole vaulter. She holds a personal best of 3.70m set at the 2019 NACAC U18 and U23 Championships in Athletics. She is a multiple gold medal winner in the pole vault at the Central American Championships in Athletics.

== International competitions ==
Year	Competition	Venue	Position	Event	Notes
2012	Central American And Caribbean Junior Championships	San Salvador, El Salvador	1st	Pole Vault	3.00 m CR
2012	Central American U16 Championships	San Jose, Costa Rica	1st	Pole Vault	3.31 m
2013	Central American and Caribbean Athletics Championships	Morelia, Mexico	5th	Pole Vault	3.25 m
2014	US Area Youth Olympic Selection Trials	Miramar, FL, United States	1st	Pole Vault	3.50 m
2014	Central American Junior Championships	Managua, Nicaragua	1st	Pole Vault	3.20 m CR
2014	Central American Championships	Tegucigalpa, Honduras	1st	Pole Vault	3.31 m CR
2014	Central American U18 Championships	Morelia, Mexico	2nd	Pole Vault	3.20 m
2014	Central American and Caribbean Games	Veracruz, Mexico	7th	Pole Vault	3.30 m
2015	Central American and Caribbean Junior Championships	San Salvador, El Salvador	1st	Pole Vault	3.50 m
2015	Central American Championships	Managua, Nicaragua	1st	Pole Vault	3.35 m CR
2015	NACAC Championships	San José, Costa Rica	5th	Pole Vault	3.50 m
2017	Central American Championships	Tegucigalpa, Honduras	1st	Pole Vault	3.40 m
2017	Central American Games	Managua, Nicaragua	NP	Pole Vault	NH
2018	Central American Championships	Guatemala City, Guatemala	1st	Pole Vault	3.42 m
2018	Central American and Caribbean Games	Barranquilla, Colombia	8th	Pole Vault	3.45 m
2019	Central American Championships	Managua, Nicaragua	1st	Pole Vault	3.60 m
2019	NACAC U23 Championships	Queretaro, Mexico	4th	Pole Vault	3.70 m PB
