= Alfonso Martínez (taekwondo) =

Belizean taekwondo practitioner

Personal information
- Born: November 13, 1982 (age 43)

Sport
- Sport: Taekwondo

Alfonso Martinez (born 13 November 1982) is a Belizean taekwondo martial artist residing in Taiwan. He represented Belize at the 2008 Summer Olympics in Beijing.
