= Belize at the 2008 Summer Olympics =

- IOC code: BIZ
- NOC: Belize Olympic and Commonwealth Games Association

in Beijing
- Competitors: 4 in 2 sports
- Flag bearer: Jonathan Williams
- Medals Ranked -th: Gold 0 Silver 0 Bronze 0 Total 0

Summer Olympics appearances (overview)
- 1968; 1972; 1976; 1980; 1984; 1988; 1992; 1996; 2000; 2004; 2008; 2012; 2016; 2020; 2024

Belize competed in the 2008 Summer Olympics, held in Beijing, People's Republic of China from 8 to 24 August 2008. Its participation in Beijing marked its eighth Olympic appearance under the name "Belize" and its tenth overall, as its first two appearances (1968 in Mexico City and 1972 in Munich) were under the name "British Honduras". The Belizean delegation in 2008 included four athletes: three participated in track and field events (Jonathan Williams, Tricia Flores, and Jayson Jones) and one in taekwondo (Alfonso Martínez). Belize did not medal in Beijing, and had not medaled before Beijing, but Jonathan Williams became the first Belizean athlete to advance past the first round of any Olympic event.

== Background ==
Belize first participated in the Olympic games at the 1968 Summer Olympics in Mexico City and has appeared in every Summer Olympics since with the exception of the 1980 Summer Olympics in the Soviet Union, represented by a total of 46 competitors. Belize was a British colony during the 1968 Mexico City Games and the 1972 Munich Games and participated under the name "British Honduras". Between 1968 and 2008 Belize had no medalists. Jonathan Williams, Belize's flag bearer in Beijing, was the first Belizean Olympian to advance past a preliminary round.

== Athletics ==
=== Men's competition ===
German-born runner Jayson Jones, who played football for Florida State University, represented Belize at both the 2000 Summer Olympics in Sydney and at the 2008 Olympics in Beijing. He qualified for the 2004 Summer Olympics in Athens despite an injury, but chose not to attend and thus his appearance at Beijing marked his third qualification but second appearance at the Olympic games. At the Olympics Jones participated in the 200 meters dash. He was placed in Heat 6 during the first round of the event on 17 August; competitors in his heat included American Wallace Spearmon, Norwegian Jaysuma Saidy Ndure, and Guinean Nabie Foday Fofonah. Jones ran the event in 21.54 seconds, ranking sixth out of the eight athletes in the heat, scoring 0.14 seconds faster than Fofanah, and 0.34 seconds behind Latvia's Ronalds Arājs (5th place). Overall, Jones ranked 53rd place out of 66 athletes. He did not progress to the next round on 18 August.

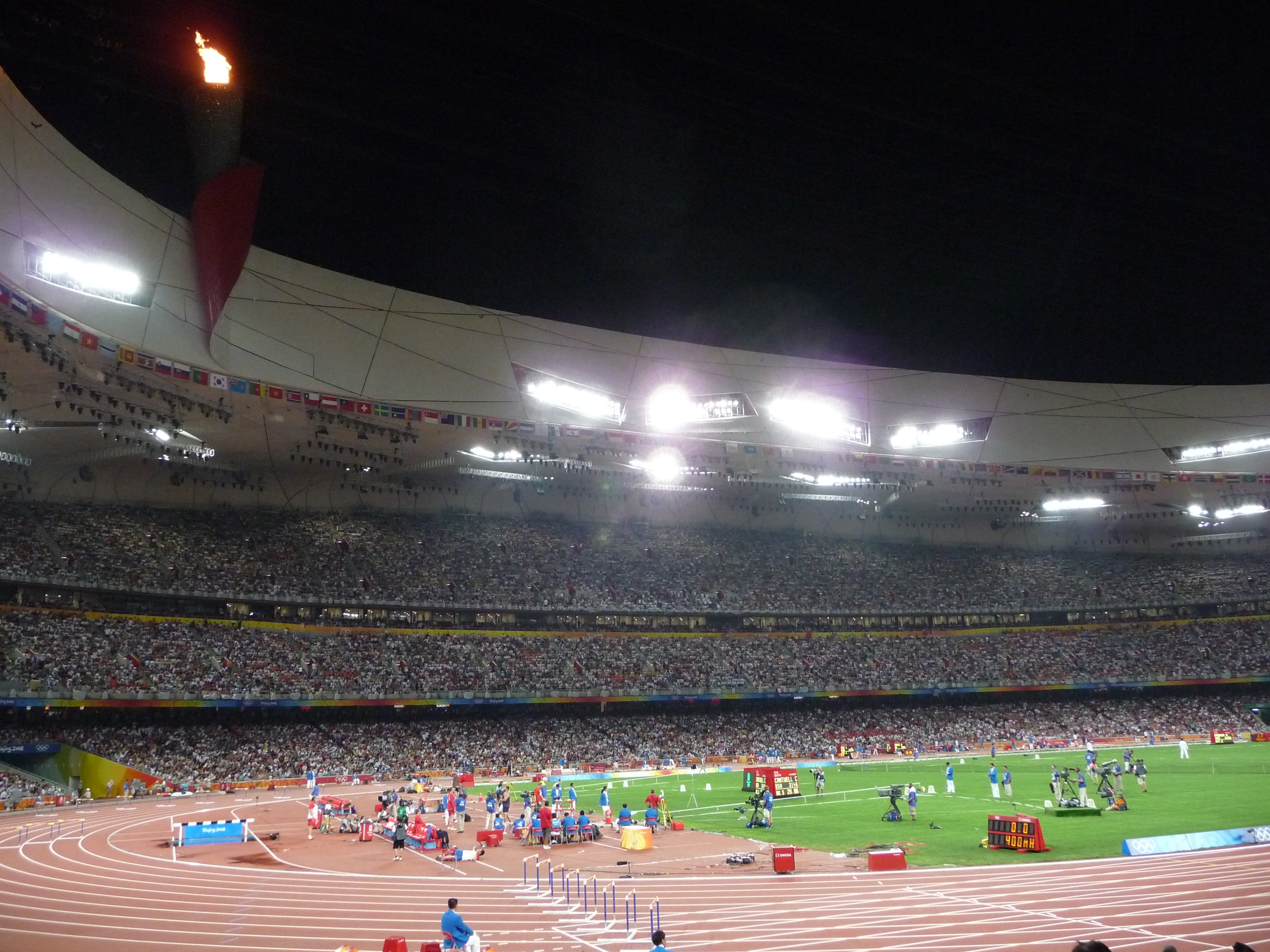
The Olympic Stadium in Beijing, where track and field events took place.

Former UCLA student Jonathan Williams took advantage of his parents' Belizean citizenship to qualify on behalf of Belize's Olympic team. Taking part in the men's 400 meters hurdles dash, his participation in Beijing marked his first Olympic appearance. Williams completed his event in 49.61 seconds, placing fourth in a heat of seven, having been placed in Heat 1 in the first round on 15 August. Williams ran 0.02 seconds faster than fifth-place finalist Kenji Narisako of Japan and 0.16 seconds slower than third-place finalist Mahau Suguimati of Brazil. Overall, Williams ranked 16th out of 26 athletes in the first round. He progressed to semifinals. In doing so, Williams became the first Belizean athlete to advance in an Olympic event. Williams participated in Heat 2 of the semifinal round on 16 August, facing athletes that included American Kerron Clement and Jamaican Danny Mcfarlane. Williams ranked sixth in a heat of eight athletes, ahead of Suguimati by 0.52 seconds but behind South African Alwyn Myburgh by 0.48 seconds. He ranked 13th place out of 16 athletes and did not advance to finals.

=== Women's competition ===
Former University of Belize athlete Tricia Flores participated on behalf of Belize at the Beijing Olympics as a long jumper. She was the only female to compete as a member of that year's Belizean delegation. Flores' participation at the Beijing Olympics marked her first appearance at any Olympic Games. Flores participated in the first qualifying heat on 18 August, where she competed against 21 athletes that included Brazil's Maurren Higa Magi, the United States' Grace Upshaw, and Sweden's Carolina Klüft. Flores ranked 19th in the heat, finishing last ahead of Slovakia's Jana Veldakova and Ukraine's Liudmyla Blonska, whose scores were not ranked. Overall, 42 athletes competed in women's long jump qualifiers and 38 completed the event. Flores ranked 38th and did not advance to semifinals, having jumped 5.25 meters.

Men

Athlete	Event	Heat		Quarterfinal		Semifinal		Final	
Athlete	Event	Result	Rank	Result	Rank	Result	Rank	Result	Rank
Jayson Jones	200 m	21.54	6	Did not advance					
Jonathan Williams	400 m hurdles	49.61	4 q	—N/a		49.64	6	Did not advance	

Women

Athlete	Event	Qualification		Final	
Athlete	Event	Distance	Position	Distance	Position
Tricia Flores	Long jump	5.25	38	Did not advance	

Key

- Note–Ranks given for track events are within the athlete's heat only
- Q = Qualified for the next round
- q = Qualified for the next round as a fastest loser or, in field events, by position without achieving the qualifying target
- NR = National record
- N/A = Round not applicable for the event
- Bye = Athlete not required to compete in round

== Taekwondo ==
Taiwan-based athlete Alfonso Martinez was the sole representative of Belize in taekwondo, and in any sport other than a track and field event, at the Beijing Olympics. Martinez took part in the men's under 58 kilogram category, otherwise known as flyweight. At the Olympics Martinez was placed in the first round's seventh match, which took place on 20 August. His opponent was Juan Antonio Ramos, a taekwondo martial artist from Spain. In the course of the match Ramos scored two points on Martinez, while Martinez scored only one on Ramos. Thus Ramos defeated Martinez and advanced to the next round, while Martinez did not. Ramos ultimately placed fifth in the final round.

Athlete	Event	Round of 16	Quarterfinals	Semifinals	Repechage	Bronze Medal	Final	
Athlete	Event	Opposition Result	Opposition Result	Opposition Result	Opposition Result	Opposition Result	Opposition Result	Rank
Alfonso Martínez	Men's −58 kg	Ramos (ESP); L 1–2	Did not advance					

== See also ==
- Belize at the 2007 Pan American Games
- Belize at the 2010 Central American and Caribbean Games
