= 2007 Central American Championships in Athletics =

XVIII Central American Championships in Athletics
- Dates: June 8–9
- Host city: San José, Costa Rica
- Venue: Estadio Nacional
- Level: Senior
- Events: 44 (22 men, 22 women)
- Participation: 7 nations

The 18th Central American Championships in Athletics were held at the Estadio Nacional in San José, Costa Rica, between June 8–9, 2007.

A total of 44 events were contested, 22 by men and 22 by women.

== Medal summary ==
Complete results and medal winners were published.

=== Men ===
Event	Gold		Silver		Bronze	
100 metres (wind: +0.5 m/s)	Rolando Palacios (HON)	10.65	Josel Ramírez (CRC)	10.66	Jonathan Williams (BIZ)	10.72
200 metres (wind: +1.4 m/s)	Nery Brenes (CRC)	21.37	Andrés Leonel Rodríguez (PAN)	22.12	Jorge Luis Jiménez (CRC)	22.34
400 metres	Nery Brenes (CRC)	47.40	Allan Ayala (GUA)	48.05	Takeshi Fujiwara (ESA)	48.21
800 metres	Jenner Pelicó (GUA)	1:53.95	Francis Jiménez (ESA)	1:53.99	Camilo Quevedo (GUA)	1:54.65
1500 metres	José Francisco Chávez (CRC)	3:59.75	Álvaro Vásquez (NCA)	4:01.83	Francis Jiménez (ESA)	4:04.55
5000 metres	José Amado García (GUA)	14:42.08	José Carlos Raxón (GUA)	14:44.00	José Francisco Chávez (CRC)	15:07.16
10,000 metres	José Amado García (GUA)	29:53.61	Alfredo Arévalo (GUA)	30:10.98	Roy Vargas (CRC)	31:18.30
110 metres hurdles (wind: +1.1 m/s)	Ronald Bennett (HON)	14.15 CR	Sadros Sánchez (PAN)	14.37	Allan Ayala (GUA)	15.07
400 metres hurdles	Jonathan Williams (BIZ)	49.87 CR	Allan Ayala (GUA)	52.15	Camilo Quevedo (GUA)	52.20
3000 metres steeplechase	José Francisco Chávez (CRC)	9:37.66	Domingo Álvarez (GUA)	9:47.41	Juan Serrano (PAN)	9:55.92
4 x 100 metres relay	Honduras; Darvin Colón; Ronald Bennett; Jonnie Lowe; Rolando Palacios	41.07 CR	Costa Rica; Javier Biasetty; Gary Robinson; Josel Ramírez; Jorge Luis Jiménez	41.30	El Salvador; Roberto Vidri; Mario Quintanilla; César Cornejo; Takeshi Fujiwara	42.34
4 x 400 metres relay	Guatemala; Hans Villagrán; Camilo Quevedo; Edwin Baltazar; Allan Ayala	3:13.95 CR	Costa Rica; Gary Robinson; Víctor Cantillano; Heinor Watson; Nery Brenes	3:14.32	El Salvador; César León; Francis Jiménez; Mario Quintanilla; Takeshi Fujiwara	3:20.95
20,000 metres Walk	Bernardo Calvo (CRC)	1:26:10.51 CR	Allan Segura (CRC)	1:27:16.12	Julio René Martínez (GUA)	1:27:30.42
High jump	Henry Linton (CRC)	1.96	Anselmo Delgado (PAN)	1.85	Jason Castro (HON)	1.70
Pole vault	Octavius Gillespie (GUA)	4.40	Marco Josué Mira (ESA)	4.30	Pedro Daniel Figueroa (ESA)	4.10
Long jump	Jonathan Romero (PAN)	7.24 (wind: +1.2 m/s)	Octavius Gillespie (GUA)	6.99 (wind: +1.6 m/s)	Marvin García (GUA)	6.95 (wind: +1.9 m/s)
Triple jump	Juan Carlos Nájera (GUA)	15.49 CR (wind: +1.9 m/s)	Marvin García (GUA)	14.99 (wind: +1.6 m/s)	Jonathan Romero (PAN)	14.95 (wind: +0.9 m/s)
Shot put	Jorge Castro (GUA)	14.31	Ariel Rodríguez (CRC)	13.70	Josuet Morales (PAN)	12.67
Discus throw	Roberto Sawyers (CRC)	44.87	Nelson Chavarría (CRC)	44.47	Raúl Rivera (GUA)	42.83
Hammer throw	Roberto Sawyers (CRC)	62.42 CR	Raúl Rivera (GUA)	61.22	Diego Berrios (GUA)	56.19
Javelin throw	Rigoberto Calderón (NCA)	65.87	Javier Ugarte (NCA)	65.61	Octavius Gillespie (GUA)	63.80
Decathlon	Darvin Colón (HON)	6267 CR	Edwin Campos (CRC)	5182	Néstor Meza (ESA)	4912

=== Women ===
Event	Gold		Silver		Bronze	
100 metres (wind: -0.8 m/s)	Tracy Joseph (CRC)	12.19	Auxiliadora Bonilla (NCA)	12.44	Kaina Martínez (BIZ); Lissete Mejía (ESA)	12.47
200 metres (wind: +1.9 m/s)	Tracy Joseph (CRC)	24.58 CR	Mariela Leal (CRC)	25.26	Lissete Mejía (ESA)	25.44
400 metres	Estefany Zamora (CRC)	58.13	Henriette Guadamuz (NCA)	58.79	Rossana Rodríguez (GUA)	58.82
800 metres	Wendy Zúñiga (CRC)	2:12.54	Gladys Landaverde (ESA)	2:13.02	Andrea Ferris (PAN)	2:14.20
1500 metres	Andrea Ferris (PAN)	4:41.79	Gladys Landaverde (ESA)	4:42.09	Wendy Zúñiga (CRC)	4:47.81
5000 metres	Elsa Monterroso (GUA)	18:43.87	María Ferris (PAN)	18:58.68	Jeimy Navarro (CRC)	19:11.11
10,000 metres	Elsa Monterroso (GUA)	39:03.18	Alejandra Murillo (CRC)	40:13.69	Guadalupe Zúñiga (CRC)	40:46.56
100 metres hurdles (wind: +1.0 m/s)	Jeimmy Bernárdez (HON)	14.42	Sharolyn Scott (CRC)	15.30	Pamela Jiménez (CRC)	16.04
400 metres hurdles	Verónica Quijano (ESA)	61.68	Dilian Ramírez (CRC)	64.01	Ana María Porras (CRC)	66.18
3000 metres steeplechase	Gabriela Traña (CRC)	11:19.81	Blanca Solís (ESA)	11:44.03	Evonne Marroquín (GUA)	11:45.24
4 x 100 metres relay	Costa Rica; Mariela Leal; Estefany Zamora; Cindy Sibaja; Sharolyn Scott	48.07	El Salvador; Verónica Quijano; Natalia Santamaría; Gladys Quijada; Lissete Mejía	48.62	Nicaragua; Inaly Morazán; Henriette Guadamuz; Auxiliadora Bonilla; Yahoska Rodríguez	48.87
4 x 400 metres relay	El Salvador; Jéssica Bautista; Joselin Escobar; Natalia Santamaría; Verónica Quijano	3:53.33	Costa Rica; Mariela Leal; Dilian Ramírez; Tracy Joseph; Estefany Zamora	3:54.78	Panama; Mardel Alvarado; Ana Ramos; Andrea Ferris; Yelena Alvear	4:00.92
10,000 metres Walk	Evelyn Núñez (GUA)	48:52.92	Francisca Ferris (PAN)	54:55.32	Glenda Ubeda (NCA)	56:17.36
High jump	Kashani Ríos (PAN)	1.62	Ana María Porras (CRC)	1.56	Kay-De Vaughn (BIZ); Gabriela Carrillo (ESA)	1.53
Pole vault	Gladys Quijada (ESA)	3.00	Jaqueline Vargas (CRC)	2.50		
Long jump	Tricia Flores (BIZ)	5.86 CR	Gabriela Carrillo (ESA)	5.85	Estefany Cruz (GUA)	5.49
Triple jump	Gabriela Carrillo (ESA)	12.64 w (wind: +3.0 m/s)	Estefany Cruz (GUA)	12.31 (wind: +1.3 m/s)	Tricia Flores (BIZ)	12.00 (wind: +1.4 m/s)
Shot put	Doroty López (GUA)	13.03 CR	Jannis Ramírez (NCA)	11.19	Kandice Vaughn (BIZ)	10.89
Discus throw	Aixa Middleton (PAN)	45.13 CR	Doroty López (GUA)	39.33	María Lourdes Ruiz (NCA)	36.18
Hammer throw	Ana Lucía Espinoza (GUA)	42.02	Viviana Abarca (CRC)	40.50	Fabiola Jovel (ESA)	38.69
Javelin throw	Dalila Rugama (NCA)	52.10 CR	Jannis Ramírez (NCA)	50.54	Lorena Medina (ESA)	36.92
Heptathlon	Ginna von Quednow (GUA)	4172	Inaly Morazán (NCA)	3765	Pamela Jiménez (CRC)	3354

== Medal table ==
An unofficial medal count is in agreement with a medal table published by CACAC.

* Host nation (Costa Rica)

Rank	Nation	Gold	Silver	Bronze	Total
1	Costa Rica*	14	15	9	38
2	Guatemala	13	10	11	34
3	Honduras	5	0	1	6
4	El Salvador	4	7	11	22
5	Panama	4	5	5	14
6	Nicaragua	2	7	3	12
7	Belize	2	0	5	7
Totals (7 entries)		44	44	45	133

== Team Ranking ==
Costa Rica won the overall team ranking.

=== Total ===
The host country is highlighted in lavender blue

Rank	Nation	Points
1st place, gold medalist(s)	Costa Rica	397
2nd place, silver medalist(s)	Guatemala	277
3rd place, bronze medalist(s)	El Salvador	226
4	(Panama) Panamá	184
5	Nicaragua	142
6	Honduras	67
7	Belize	61
