= Belize at the Olympics =

- IOC code: BIZ
- NOC: Belize Olympic and Commonwealth Games Association
- Website: belizeolympic.org
- Medals: Gold 0 Silver 0 Bronze 0 Total 0

Summer appearances
- 1968; 1972; 1976; 1980; 1984; 1988; 1992; 1996; 2000; 2004; 2008; 2012; 2016; 2020; 2024

Belize first participated at the Olympic Games in 1968 and has sent athletes to compete in every Summer Olympic Games since then, except when they participated in the American-led boycott of the 1980 Summer Olympics. The nation has never participated in the Winter Olympic Games. From 1968 to 1972, Belize was known by its colonial name of British Honduras.

The National Olympic Committee for Belize was created in 1967 and recognized by the International Olympic Committee that same year.

As of 2024, no athlete from Belize has ever won an Olympic medal. Their highest result was in 2012, when Kenneth Medwood finished 5th in his semifinal heat in the 400m hurdles.

== Medal tables ==
=== Medals by Summer Games ===
| Games | Athletes | Gold | Silver | Bronze | Total | Rank |
| 1968 Mexico City | 7 | 0 | 0 | 0 | 0 | – |
| (West Germany) 1972 Munich | 1 | 0 | 0 | 0 | 0 | – |
| (Canada) 1976 Montreal | 4 | 0 | 0 | 0 | 0 | – |
| (Soviet Union) 1980 Moscow | boycotted | | | | | |
| (United States) 1984 Los Angeles | 11 | 0 | 0 | 0 | 0 | – |
| (South Korea) 1988 Seoul | 10 | 0 | 0 | 0 | 0 | – |
| (Spain) 1992 Barcelona | 10 | 0 | 0 | 0 | 0 | – |
| (United States) 1996 Atlanta | 5 | 0 | 0 | 0 | 0 | – |
| (Australia) 2000 Sydney | 2 | 0 | 0 | 0 | 0 | – |
| (Greece) 2004 Athens | 2 | 0 | 0 | 0 | 0 | – |
| (China) 2008 Beijing | 4 | 0 | 0 | 0 | 0 | – |
| (United Kingdom) 2012 London | 3 | 0 | 0 | 0 | 0 | – |
| (Brazil) 2016 Rio de Janeiro | 3 | 0 | 0 | 0 | 0 | – |
| (Japan) 2020 Tokyo | 3 | 0 | 0 | 0 | 0 | – |
| (France) 2024 Paris | 1 | 0 | 0 | 0 | 0 | – |
| (United States) 2028 Los Angeles | future event | | | | | |
| (Australia) 2032 Brisbane | future event | | | | | |
| Total | | 0 | 0 | 0 | 0 | – |

== See also ==
- List of flag bearers for Belize at the Olympics
- Category:Olympic competitors for Belize
