= Jayson Jones =

German-born Belizean runner (born 1977)

Personal information
- Born: 15 August 1977 (age 49)
- Height: 1.80 m (5 ft 11 in)
- Weight: 85 kg (187 lb)

Sport
- Country: Belize
- Sport: Men's Athletics
- Event: Sprint
Medal record
Men's Athletics
Representing Belize
Central American Games
Silver medal – second place	1997 San Pedro Sula	4x400 m relay
Bronze medal – third place	2001 Guatemala City	4x400 m relay
Central American Championships
Bronze medal – third place	2011 San José	4x400 m relay
- Updated on 11 September 2012

Jayson Jones (born 15 August 1977) is a German-born Belizean runner. He participated on Belize's behalf at the 2008 Summer Olympics in Beijing, and previously represented Belize at the 2000 Summer Olympics in Sydney.

== International competitions ==
Year	Competition	Venue	Position	Event	Notes
Representing Belize
1997	Central American Games	San Pedro Sula, Honduras	2nd	4 × 400 m relay	
2000	NACAC U-25 Championships	Monterrey, Mexico	6th (h)	100m	10.98 (wind: -0.5 m/s)
2000	NACAC U-25 Championships	Monterrey, Mexico	5th (h)	200m	22.16 (wind: +0.9 m/s)
2000	Olympic Games	Sydney, Australia	63rd	200 m	22.20 (-0.3 m/s)
2001	World Championships	Edmonton, Canada	8th (h)	200 m	22.13
2001	Central American Games	Guatemala City, Guatemala	3rd	4 × 400 m relay	3:35.67
2003	Pan American Games	Santo Domingo, Dominican Republic	21st	100 m	10.82
2003	Pan American Games	Santo Domingo, Dominican Republic	24th	200 m	21.80
2006	Commonwealth Games	Melbourne, Australia	35th	100 m	10.84 (0.3 m/s)
2006	Commonwealth Games	Melbourne, Australia	41st	200 m	21.93 (-0.4 m/s)
2008	Olympic Games	Beijing, China	6th (h)	200 m	21.54
2011	Central American Championships	San José, Costa Rica	3rd	4 × 400 m relay	3:22.40
2011	Pan American Games	Guadalajara, Mexico	22nd	400 m	51.60
