= Emery Gill =

Belizean sprinter

Personal information
- Nationality: Belizean
- Born: 26 February 1966 (age 60)

Sport
- Sport: Sprinting
- Event: 100 metres

Emery Paul Gill (born 26 February 1966) is a Belizean sprinter. He competed in the men's 100 metres at the 1992 Summer Olympics.
