= Bryan Ramos (footballer) =

Honduran footballer (born 2001)

Personal information
- Date of birth: 8 August 2001 (age 25)
- Place of birth: La Ceiba, Honduras
- Position: Goalkeeper

Team information
- Current team: Real Juventud

Youth career
- Real España

Senior career*
Years	Team	Apps	(Gls)
- Real España
- Real Juventud
- * Club domestic league appearances and goals

Bryan Andrés Ramos Paz (born 8 August 2001) is a Honduran professional footballer who plays as a goalkeeper for Real Juventud.
