= Jonathan Williams (hurdler) =

American runner (born 1983)

Personal information
- Born: August 29, 1983 (age 42) Los Angeles, California, United States
- Height: 1.80 m (5 ft 11 in)
- Weight: 78 kg (172 lb)

Sport
- Country: Belize
- Sport: Men's Athletics
- Event: Hurdling
Medal record
Men's Athletics
Representing Belize
NACAC Championships
Silver medal – second place	2007 San Salvador	400 m hurdles
Central American Games
Gold medal – first place	2010 Panama City	400 m hurdles
Silver medal – second place	2010 Panama City	110 m hurdles
Central American Championships
Gold medal – first place	2009 Guatemala City	400 m hurdles
Gold medal – first place	2007 San José	400 m hurdles
Silver medal – second place	2009 Panama City	110 m hurdles
Bronze medal – third place	2007 San José	100 m
- Updated on 26 July 2014

Jonathan Robert Williams (born August 29, 1983) is an American hurdler who has represented Belize internationally. He represented Belize at the 2008 Summer Olympics in Beijing. Williams attended the University of California, Los Angeles at the time.

On 1 July 2006, he changed affiliation from USA to Belize.

== Personal bests ==
- 200 m: 21.34 s (wind: +0.6 m/s) – (United States) Walnut, California, 10 March 2007
- 400 m: 47.62 s – (United States) Carson, California, 20 May 2007
- 800 m: 1:52.33 min – (United States) Walnut, California, 8 March 2008
- 110 m hurdles: 13.81 s (wind: +0.5 m/s) – (United States) Los Angeles, California, 15 May 2005
- 400 m hurdles: 48.88 s – (El Salvador) San Salvador, 14 July 2007

== Achievements ==
Year	Competition	Venue	Position	Event	Notes
Representing Belize
2006	Central American and Caribbean Games	Cartagena, Colombia	6th	400 m hurdles	50.92
2007	Central American Championships	San José, Costa Rica	3rd	100 m	10.72 (+0.5 m/s)
2007	Central American Championships	San José, Costa Rica	1st	400 m hurdles	49.87 CR
2007	NACAC Championships	San Salvador, El Salvador	2nd	400 m hurdles	48.88
2007	Pan American Games	Rio de Janeiro, Brazil	9th (h)	400 m hurdles	49.84
2007	World Championships	Osaka, Japan	21st (sf)	400 m hurdles	49.77
2008	Olympic Games	Beijing, China	6th (sf)	400 m hurdles	49.64
2009	Central American Championships	Guatemala City, Guatemala	2nd	110 m hurdles	14.23 (-0.4 m/s)
2009	Central American Championships	Guatemala City, Guatemala	1st	400 m hurdles	49.73 CR
2009	World Championships	Berlin, Germany	27th (h)	400 m hurdles	52.41
2010	Central American Games	Panama City, Panama	2nd	110 m hurdles	14.18 (0.0 m/s)
2010	Central American Games	Panama City, Panama	1st	400 m hurdles	50.53 GR
2010	Central American and Caribbean Games	Mayagüez, Puerto Rico	10th (h)	400 m hurdles	52.55

Olympic Games
Preceded by Emma Wade	Flagbearer for Belize; Beijing 2008	Succeeded by Kenneth Medwood
