= Joslyn Chavarria =

Belizean cyclist

Personal information
- Born: 18 April 1959 (age 67)

Cycling career
- Sport: Cycling

Joslyn Chavarria (born 18 April 1959) is a Belizean former cyclist. He competed in the individual road race and the team time trial events at the 1984 Summer Olympics.

He has been described as a "Belizean cycling legend."
