= Ian Gray (runner) =

Belizean middle-distance runner

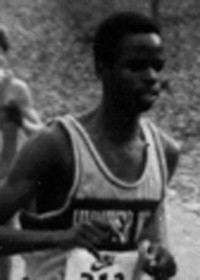

Personal information
- Nationality: Belizean
- Born: 16 December 1963 (age 62)

Sport
- Sport: Middle-distance running
- Event: 1500 metres

Ian Rupert Emerson Gray (born 16 December 1963) is a Belizean middle-distance runner. He competed in the 5000 meters at the 1988 Summer Olympics and the men's 1500 metres at the 1992 Summer Olympics.

Gray attended Hunter College in New York City, where he competed for the Hunter Hawks track and field team until his graduation in 1989. While at Hunter, Gray placed runner-up at the 1987 Eastern College Athletic Conference cross country championship and set a school record for the famed Van Cortlandt Park 8K cross country course. Gray was also an ECAC track and field individual champion in 1988. He was a member of three record-setting relay teams. Gray was coached by Ed Zarowin in college.

In May 1987, Gray set the Belizean national record in the 5000 m, running 14:57.3. At the 1988 Olympics, Gray placed 17th in his 5000 m heat and failed to advance to the finals. Gray would improve his 5000 m national record time to 14:28.0 in 1991.

At the 1992 Barcelona Games, Gray started but did not finish his 1500 m heat. Gray was one of five Belizean track athletes and ten total Belizean representatives at the 1992 Games.

Gray continued running in middle-distances, joining the Staten Island Road Runners to compete at the 1992 Penn Relays 4 × 400 m and 4 × 800 m relays. He was inducted into the Hawks Hall of Fame in 1998. He continued to be involved in the sport, attending the 2008 Summer Olympics in Beijing.
