= 2011 Central American Championships in Athletics =

XXII Central American Championships in Athletics
- Dates: June 24–26
- Host city: San José, Costa Rica
- Venue: Estadio Nacional
- Level: Senior
- Events: 43 (22 men, 21 women)
- Participation: 7 + 1 guest nation nations

The 22nd Central American Championships in Athletics were held at the Estadio Nacional in San José, Costa Rica, between June 24–26, 2011.

A total of 43 events were contested, 22 by men and 21 by women.

== Participation ==
In addition to the 7 CADICA members, two athletes from Suriname participated as guests.

== Medal summary ==
Complete results and medal winners were published.

=== Men ===
Event	Gold		Silver		Bronze	
100 metres (wind: -0.7 m/s)	Rolando Palacios (HON)	10.57	Josef Norales (HON)	10.72	Mateo Edward (PAN)	10.75
200 metres (wind: -0.5 m/s)	Rolando Palacios (HON)	20.97 CR	Gary Robinson (CRC)	21.77	Helson Pitillo (HON)	21.91
400 metres	Nery Brenes (CRC)	45.85 CR	Takeshi Fujiwara (ESA)	47.12	Michael Guerrero (CRC)	49.26
800 metres	Jenner Pelicó (GUA)	1:51.46 CR	Arnoldo Monge (CRC)	1:51.81	Edgar Cortés (NCA)	1:51.84
1500 metres	Jenner Pelicó (GUA)	3:55.18	Erick Rodríguez (NCA)	3:57.86	Alejandro Calderón (CRC)	4:02.28
5000 metres	William Sánchez (ESA)	15:08.98	Jose Francisco Chávez (CRC)	15:30.65	Javier Fernández (CRC)	15:41.58
10,000 metres	Alfredo Arévalo (GUA)	31:07.06	William Sánchez (ESA)	31:38.47	César Lizano (CRC)	31:59.07
110 metres hurdles (wind: 0.4 m/s)	Ronald Bennett (HON)	14.05 CR	Renan Palma (ESA)	14.34	Esteban Guzmán (HON)	14.47
400 metres hurdles	Kenneth Medwood (BIZ)	51.42	Ivan Lu (PAN)	54.14	Pedro Miguel Suazo (HON)	54.17
3000 metres steeplechase	Erick Rodríguez (NCA)	9:23.15	Douglas Aguilar (ESA)	9:50.95	Carlos Rivera (CRC)	9:58.56
4 x 100 metres relay	Honduras; Rolando Palacios; Helson Pitillo; Josef Norales; Ronald Bennett	40.83 CR	Panama; Alberto Perriman; Ivan Lu; Jhamal Bowen; Mateo Edward	41.39	Costa Rica; César Andrey Vásquez; Gary Robinson; Jorge Jimenez	41.90
4 x 400 metres relay	Costa Rica; César Andrey Vásquez; Gary Robinson; Michael Guerrero; Víctor Cantillano	3:15.10	El Salvador; Juan Francisco Cuellar; Marlon Colorado; Rolando Ayala; Takeshi Fujiwara	3:21.45	Belize; Jayson Jones; Kenneth Bracket; Kenneth Medwood; Mark Anderson	3:22.40
20 Kilometres Walk	Allan Segura (CRC)	1:25:06.83	Bernardo Calvo (CRC)	1:29:09.67	Mauricio Calvo (CRC)	1:39:08.11
High jump	Henry Linton (CRC)	2.14 CR	Marlon Colorado (ESA)	2.08	Henry Edmond (PAN)	1.99
Pole vault^{†}	Josue Berrocal (CRC)	3.50	Rolando Ayala (ESA)	3.30	Mario Meza (CRC)	3.30
Long jump	Jhamal Bowen (PAN)	7.56 CR (wind: 0.4 m/s)	Kessel Campbell (HON)	7.55 (wind: 0.4 m/s)	Jason Castro (HON)	7.40 (wind: -0.4 m/s)
Triple jump	Jason Castro (HON)	15.87 CR (wind: 0.6 m/s)	Kessel Campbell (HON)	15.81 (wind: 1.1 m/s)	Seylik Gamboa (GUA)	14.06 (wind: 0.2 m/s)
Shot put	Roberto Sawyers (CRC)	15.68	Juan José Alvarez (HON)	14.42	Bryan Méndez (CRC)	13.87
Discus throw	Roberto Sawyers (CRC)	48.16	Winston Campbell (HON)	47.47	Juan Galdamez (ESA)	45.12
Hammer throw	Roberto Sawyers (CRC)	65.38	Diego Berrios (GUA)	57.87	Edgar Florián (GUA)	57.12
Javelin throw	Benigno Ortega (PAN)	56.92	Erick Méndez (CRC)	51.24	Fred Villalobos (CRC)	51.11
Decathlon	Darvin Colón (HON)	6519	Edwin Campos (CRC)	5333	Rolando Ayala (ESA)	5242

==== Note ====
^{†}: Event might have been treated as exhibition because of the low number of participants.

=== Women ===
Event	Gold		Silver		Bronze	
100 metres (wind: -0.6 m/s)	Kaina Martínez (BIZ)	11.74 CR	Ruth Hunt (PAN)	12.00	Jeimmy Bernárdez (HON)	12.14
200 metres (wind: -0.7 m/s)	Kaina Martínez (BIZ)	24.17 CR	Ruth Hunt (PAN)	24.26	Shantelly Scott (CRC)	25.23
400 metres	Sharolyn Scott (CRC)	55.03	Andrea Ferris (PAN)	55.83	Natalia Santamaría (ESA)	57.77
800 metres	Andrea Ferris (PAN)	2:10.88	Gladys Landaverde (ESA)	2:18.75	Yuly Orozco (CRC)	2:23.85
1500 metres	Andrea Ferris (PAN)	4:40.29	Evonne Marroquín (GUA)	4:45.33	Mónica Vargas (CRC)	4:50.40
5000 metres	María Ferris (PAN)	18:15.54	Delbin Cartagena (ESA)	18:17.27	Norma Rodríguez (CRC)	18:36.58
10,000 metres	María Ferris (PAN)	38:33.55	Delbin Cartagena (ESA)	40:12.26	Marta Jimenez (ESA)	40:21.97
100 metres hurdles (wind: -0.5 m/s)	Jeimmy Bernárdez (HON)	14.85	Pamela Jimenez (CRC)	16.04	Rocío Zamora (CRC)	16.85
400 metres hurdles	Sharolyn Scott (CRC)	58.78 CR	Jessica Aguilera (NCA)	64.11	Gabriela Guevara (PAN)	66.76
3000 metres steeplechase^{†}	Evonne Marroquín (GUA)	11:08.68 CR	Yelka Mairena (NCA)	11:51.00		
4 x 100 metres relay	Belize; Charnelle Enríquez; Julie McCord; Kaina Martínez; Tricia Flores	48.50	Costa Rica; Jéssica Sánchez; Mariela Leal; Melanie Foulkes; Shantelly Scott	48.60	Panama; Kashany Ríos; Nathalee Aranda; Ruth Hunt; Yelena Alvear	49.36
4 x 400 metres relay	Costa Rica; Jéssica Sánchez; Shantelly Scott; Sharolyn Scott; Yolide Solís	3:49.23 CR	Panama; Andrea Ferris; Gabriela Guevara; Verónica Vega; María Ferris	3:56.95	Belize; Charnelle Kelly; Julia McCord; Tricia Flores; Katy Sealy	4:23.35
10,000 metres Track Walk^{†}	Cristina López (ESA)	49:48.36	Ilena Ocampo (CRC)	62:49.32	Elizabeth Vega (CRC)	69:58.85
High jump	Kashany Ríos (PAN)	1.73	Kay-De Vaughn (BIZ)	1.55	Ligia Paniagua (CRC)	1.50
Long jump	Tricia Flores (BIZ)	5.85 (wind: 1.0 m/s)	Ana Lucía Camargo (GUA)	5.69 (wind: 0.0 m/s)	Nathalee Aranda (PAN)	5.68 (wind: 0.1 m/s)
Triple jump	Ana Lucía Camargo (GUA)	12.86 (wind: 1.4 m/s)	Tricia Flores (BIZ)	11.95 (wind: 1.0 m/s)	Jéssica Sánchez (CRC)	11.56 (wind: -0.1 m/s)
Shot put	Doroty López (GUA)	12.87	Aixa Middleton (PAN)	11.66	Silvia Piñar (CRC)	11.31
Discus throw	Aixa Middleton (PAN)	46.28 CR	Doroty López (GUA)	42.51	Silvia Piñar (CRC)	37.09
Hammer throw	Ana Harry (HON)	41.23	Silvia Piñar (CRC)	40.85	Marisol Zeledón (NCA)	34.11
Javelin throw	Dalila Rugama (NCA)	45.45	Génova Arias (CRC)	43.09	Rocío Navarro (PAN)	42.47
Heptathlon	Ana María Porras (CRC)	4585 CR	Katy Sealy (BIZ)	4254	Maria Morazán (NCA)	3656

==== Note ====
^{†}: Event might have been treated as exhibition because of the low number of participants.

== Medal table (unofficial) ==
* Host nation (Costa Rica)

Rank	Nation	Gold	Silver	Bronze	Total
1	Costa Rica*	12	11	20	43
2	Panama	8	7	6	21
3	Honduras	8	5	5	18
4	Guatemala	6	4	2	12
5	Belize	5	3	2	10
6	El Salvador	2	10	4	16
7	Nicaragua	2	3	3	8
Totals (7 entries)		43	43	42	128

=== Note ===
There are fewer medals in the published medal count. Men's pole vault, and women's 3000 m steeplechase and 10,000 m race walk might have been treated as exhibition events because of the low number of participants.

== Team trophies ==
Costa Rica won the overall team trophy.

=== Total ===
The host country is highlighted in lavender blue

Rank	Nation	Points
1st place, gold medalist(s)	Costa Rica	137
2nd place, silver medalist(s)	Panama	79
3rd place, bronze medalist(s)	Honduras	65
4	Guatemala	45
5	Belize	43
6	El Salvador	41
7	Nicaragua	26
