= Charles Lewis (cyclist) =

Belizean cyclist

Personal information
- Born: 14 November 1968 (age 57)

Cycling career
- Sport: Cycling

Charles Lewis (born 14 November 1968) is a Belizean former cyclist. He competed in the team time trial at the 1988 Summer Olympics.
