= Warren Coye =

Belizean cyclist

Personal information
- Born: 7 December 1965 (age 60)

Cycling career
- Sport: Cycling

Warren Coye (born 7 December 1965) is a Belizean former cyclist. He competed in the individual road race and the team time trial events at the 1984 Summer Olympics.

He later served as treasurer of the Cycling Federation of Belize.

Warren remains an active cyclist, participating in national and international events in the Master's category.
