= Brandon Jones (athlete) =

Belizean American athlete (born 1987)

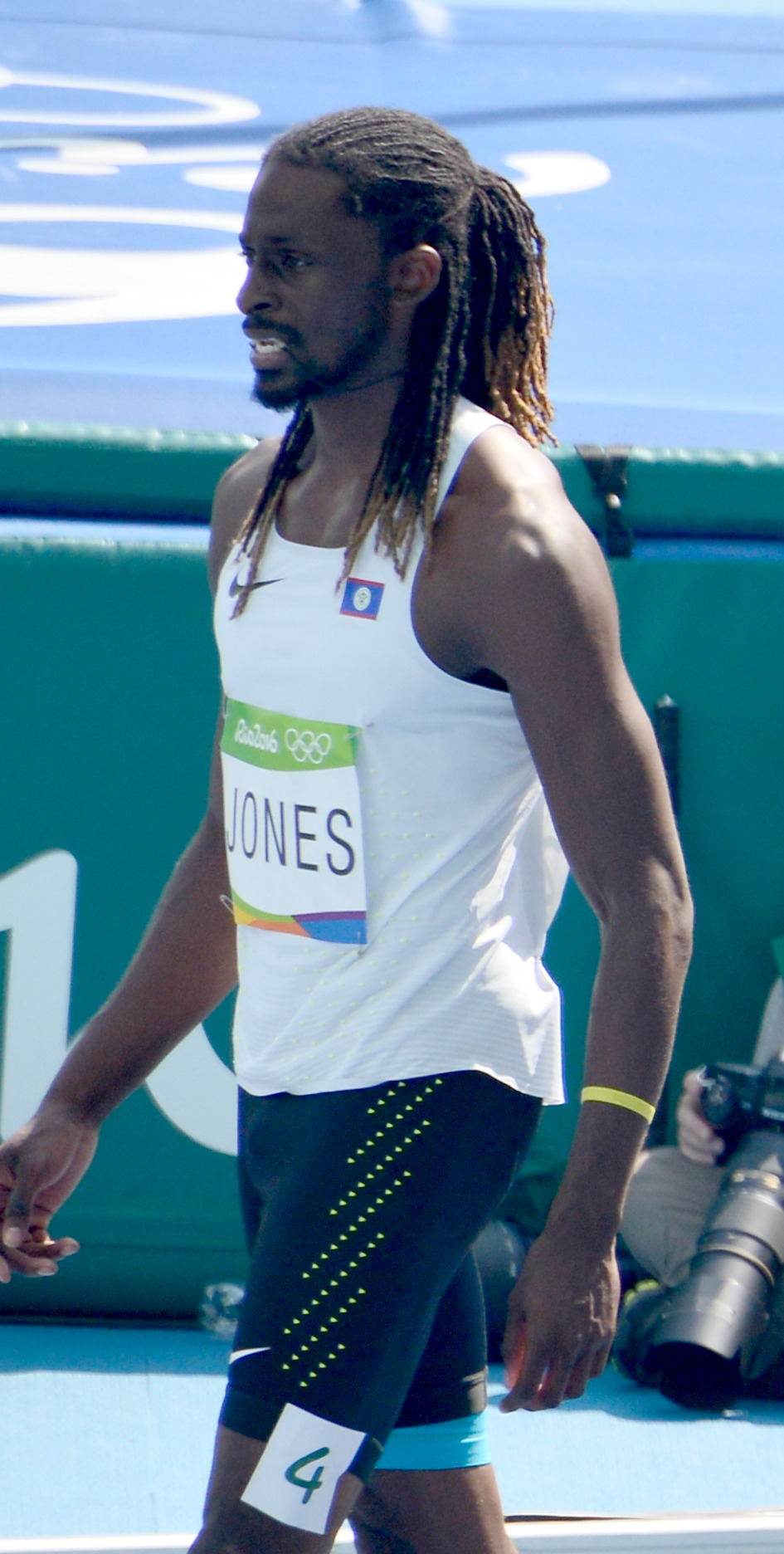
- Jones at the 2016 Olympics

Personal information
- Born: 19 July 1987 (age 39)
- Education: Hampton University
- Height: 1.99 m (6 ft 6 in)
- Weight: 90 kg (198 lb)

Sport
- Sport: Athletics
- Event: Sprint
- University team: Hampton Pirates
- Coached by: Aldrin Gray

Achievements and titles
- Olympic finals: Rio 2016
- Personal bests: 100 m – 10.49 (2015); 200 m – 21.17 (2014); Triple jump - 16.22 NR (2016)

Brandon Terrell Jones (born 19 July 1987) is a Belizean American athlete. He competed for Belize at the 2016 Summer Olympics in the 200 m race; his time in the heats was a seasonal best but did not qualify him for the semifinals.

Jones was born in the U.S. state of Virginia to Belizean father Kent Smith and American mother Carmen Jones-Smith. He attended Hampton University, where he holds the school record in the indoor triple jump. He has competed internationally for Belize since 2012; he competes in sprinting, triple jump, and long jump, and has won medals at the Central American Championships in Athletics. Jones was the flag bearer for Belize at the 2016 Summer Olympics Parade of Nations.

Olympic Games
Preceded by Kenneth Medwood	Flagbearer for Belize; Rio 2016	Succeeded by Samantha Dirks; Shaun Gill
