= Ernest Meighan =

Belizean cyclist

Personal information
- Born: 15 June 1971
- Died: 9 August 2014 (aged 43)

Cycling career
- Sport: Cycling

Ernest Dwayne Meighan (15 June 1971 – 9 August 2014) was a Belizean former cyclist. He competed in two events at the 1992 Summer Olympics. He was nicknamed JawMeighan.

He was killed in a shooting in Belize City just before noon on 9 August 2014, along with three other victims.
