= Mario Mendoza (weightlifter) =

Belizean weightlifter

Personal information
- Nationality: Belize
- Born: 21 November 1943 (age 82) Belize City, British Honduras
- Height: 170 cm (5 ft 7 in)
- Weight: 62 kg (137 lb)

Sport
- Sport: Weightlifting

Mario Rafael Mendoza (21 November 1943) is a former weightlifter, who represented British Honduras at the 1968 Summer Olympics.

Mendoza was 24 years old when he competed at the 1968 Summer Olympics in Mexico. He entered the lightweight contest where he lifted 82.5kg in the press, 87.5kg in the snatch and 110kg in the clean and jerk giving him a total of 280kg and he finished in 19th place.
