= Camille Solis =

Belizean cyclist

Personal information
- Full name: S. Camille Solis
- Born: 16 November 1971 (age 54) Belize

Cycling career
- Sport: Cycling
- Discipline: Road cycling
- Role: Rider

Stephanie Camille Solis (born 16 November 1971) is a former road cyclist from Belize. She represented her nation at the 1992 and 1996 Summer Olympics in the women's road race. She was the first woman to represent Belize at the Olympics.
