= Owen Phillips (sport shooter) =

Belizean sports shooter

Personal information
- Born: 9 July 1906 Belize City
- Died: 24 May 1983 (76 age) Mobile, Alabama

Sport
- Sport: Sports shooting

Owen Napier Denbigh Phillips (9 July 1906 — 24 May 1983) was a Belizean sports shooter. He competed at the 1972 Summer Olympics and the 1976 Summer Olympics. At the 1972 Olympics, he competed in mixed 50 metre free pistol and mixed 50 metre rifle, prone. At the 1976 Olympics, he competed in mixed 50 metre rifle, prone.
