= Michael Lewis (cyclist) =

Belizean professional racing cyclist (born 1967)

Personal information
- Born: 14 October 1967 (age 59)

Cycling career
- Sport: Cycling

Michael Dennison Lewis (born 14 October 1967) is a Belizean professional racing cyclist, who twice competed for his native country at the Summer Olympics: 1988 and 1992.

== Career ==
1989
2nd in Holy Saturday Classic (BIZ)
1992
1st in Holy Saturday Classic (BIZ)
2003
2nd in Belize National Championships, Road, Elite, Belize (BIZ)
2005
2nd in Holy Saturday Classic (BIZ)
1st in KREM New Years' Day Cycling Classic (BIZ)
2007
1st in Belize National Championships, Road, Elite, Belize (BIZ)
3rd in Alpheus Williams Classic (BIZ)
2008
3rd in KREM New Years' Day Cycling Classic (BIZ)
