= Emma Wade =

Belizean sprinter

Sport
- Event: Athletics

Emma Wade (born 1980) is a Belizean sprinter. She competed in the Women's 200 meters event at the 2004 Olympic Games. She was eliminated in Round 1 but achieved a personal best time of 23.43 seconds. Wade was the flag-bearer for Belize at the 2000 and 2004 Olympic Games.

Wade competed for the South Carolina State Lady Bulldogs track and field team in the NCAA.

Olympic Games
Preceded by Eugène Muslar	Flagbearer for Belize; Sydney 2000 Athens 2004	Succeeded by Jonathan Williams
