= Shaun Gill =

Belizean sprinter

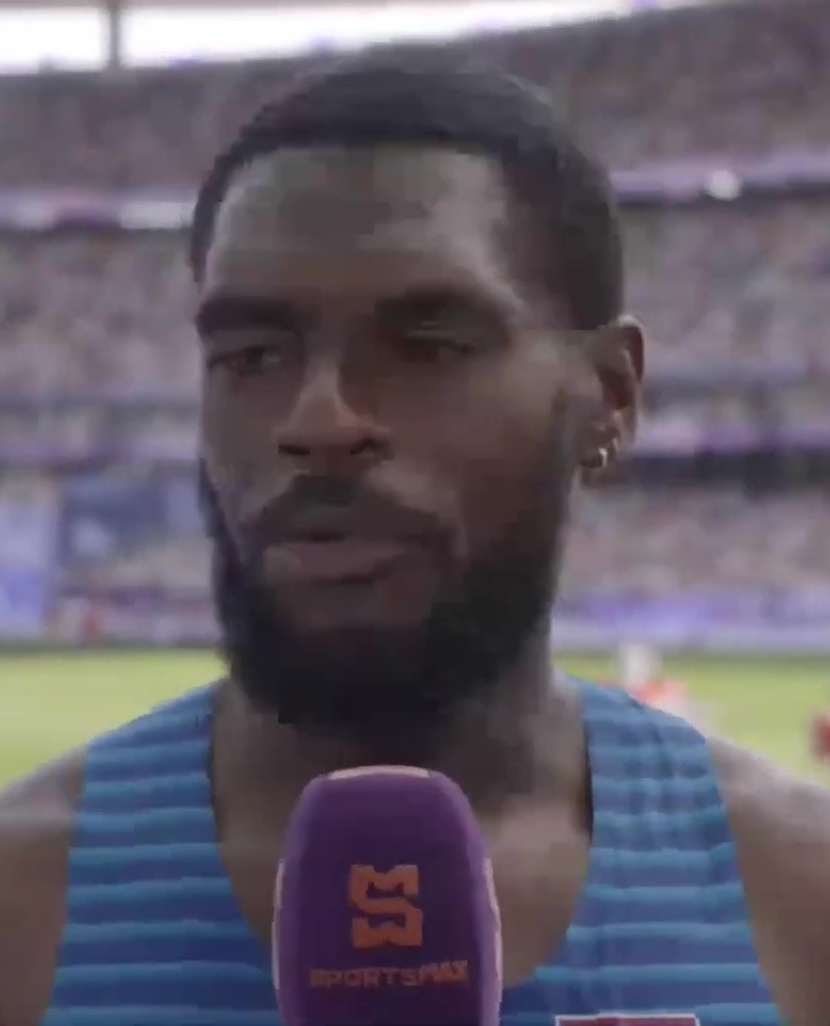
- Shaun Gill during the 2024 Summer Olympics

Personal information
- Born: 9 April 1993 (age 33) Belize City, Belize

Sport
- Sport: Athletics
- Event: Sprinting

Shaun Gill (born 9 April 1993) is a Belizean sprinter.

He competed in the men's 60 metres at the 2018 IAAF World Indoor Championships. He competed in the preliminary rounds at the 2020 Olympic Games 100 metres, in Tokyo running 10.88 seconds. He was the only competitor in any sport to qualify for his nation of Belize at the 2024 Summer Olympics, finishing 6th in his heat for the men's 100 metres, resulting in his elimination and ultimately missing his only chance of earning his only Olympic medal. His personal best time in the 100m sprint is 10.57 seconds at the Central American Games at the Managua Venue in Nicaragua on December 9, 2017.

Olympic Games
Preceded by Brandon Jones	Flag bearer for Belize; Tokyo 2020 with Samantha Dirks; Paris 2024	Succeeded by Incumbent
