= Kenneth Medwood =

Belizean athlete (born 1987)

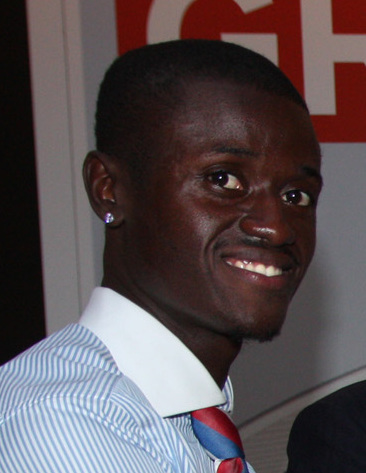

Personal information
- Full name: Kenneth Nathaniel Medwood
- Born: December 14, 1987 (age 38) Belize City, Belize
- Height: 1.854 m (6 ft 1 in)
- Weight: 73 kg (161 lb)

Sport
- Country: Belize
- Sport: Men's Athletics
- Events: Hurdling, Sprint
- University team: Long Beach State Beach
Medal record
Men's Athletics
Representing Belize
Central American Games
Gold medal – first place	2013 San José	400 m hurdles
Central American Championships
Gold medal – first place	2012 Managua	400 m hurdles
Gold medal – first place	2011 San José	400 m hurdles
Silver medal – second place	2012 Managua	4x400 m relay
Bronze medal – third place	2011 San José	4x400 m relay
- Updated on July 14, 2014

Kenneth Nathaniel Medwood (born December 14, 1987) is a Belizean track and field athlete, specializing in the 400 metres hurdles. He competed in the 2011 IAAF World Championships in Athletics and was his nation's flagbearer in the opening ceremonies of the 2012 Summer Olympics.

== Biography ==
Medwood was born on December 14, 1987, in Belize City. He grew up in Los Angeles, attending Theodore Roosevelt High School, where he was a three time Los Angeles City Section Champion in the high jump. He holds the Frosh/Soph division record. In both 2005 and 2006, he finished in a tie for 4th place at the CIF California State Meet. He also played basketball and tennis.

Next he attended East Los Angeles College where he began to excel in the long hurdles. He was the state community college champion both years, establishing the state record in the 400 hurdles at 51.63.

He moved on to compete at Long Beach State University where he was runner up in the Big West Conference in both the 400 hurdles and long jump in his first season. He won the 2010 Big West title in the 400 meter hurdles in a then personal best 49.66, which also was his second time breaking the school record during his senior season. He ended the year at the NCAA championships, where he finished as the 17th best collegiate hurdler in the nation.

He set his personal record in the 400 hurdles at the 2012 Mt. SAC Relays, running 49.54.

== Personal bests ==
- 200 m: 21.49 s (wind: +1.0 m/s) – Norwalk, United States, April 17, 2010
- 400 m: 47.83 s – Walnut, United States, April 12, 2008
- 400 m hurdles: 49.54 s – Walnut, United States, April 21, 2012
- Long jump: 7.49 m (wind: -0.8 m/s) – Los Angeles, United States, May 14, 2010

== Achievements ==
Year	Competition	Venue	Position	Event	Notes
Representing Belize
2010	Central American and Caribbean Games	Mayagüez, Puerto Rico	5th	400 m hurdles	51.08
2011	Central American Championships	San José, Costa Rica	1st	400 m hurdles	51.42
2011	Central American Championships	San José, Costa Rica	3rd	4 × 400 m relay	3:22.40
2011	Pan American Games	Guadalajara, Mexico	15th (sf)	400 m	51.90
2011	Pan American Games	Guadalajara, Mexico	DNF (sf)	4 × 100 m relay	
2011	Pan American Games	Guadalajara, Mexico	DNF (sf)	4 × 400 m relay	
2011	World Championships	Daegu, South Korea	32nd (h)	400 m hurdles	51.19
2012	Central American Championships	Managua, Nicaragua	1st	400 m hurdles	49.81
2012	Central American Championships	Managua, Nicaragua	2nd	4 × 400 m relay	3:19.33
2012	Olympic Games	London, United Kingdom	5th (sf)	400 m hurdles	49.87
2013	Central American Games	San José, Costa Rica	1st	400 m hurdles	51.14
2013	Central American Games	San José, Costa Rica	4th	4 × 100 m relay	42.94
2013	Central American Championships	Managua, Nicaragua	1st	400 m hurdles	51.42
2013	Central American Championships	Managua, Nicaragua	3rd	4 × 400 m relay	3:18.13
2014	Central American Championships	Tegucigalpa, Honduras	2nd	400 m hurdles	51.16

Olympic Games
Preceded by Jonathan Williams	Flagbearer for Belize; London 2012	Succeeded by Brandon Jones
