= Kaina Martinez =

Belizean athlete

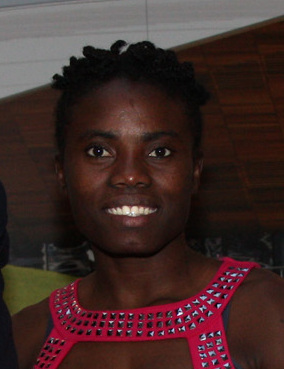

Personal information
- Full name: Kaina Darina Martinez
- Born: 20 February 1986 (age 40) Seine Bight, Stann Creek, Belize
- Height: 1.57 m (5 ft 2 in)
- Weight: 59 kg (130 lb)

Sport
- Country: Belize
- Sport: Women's Athletics
- Event: Sprint
Medal record
Women's Athletics
Representing Belize
Central American Games
Gold medal – first place	2010 Panama City	100 m
Gold medal – first place	2010 Panama City	200 m
Silver medal – second place	2010 Panama City	Long jump
Central American Championships
Gold medal – first place	2011 San José	100 m
Gold medal – first place	2011 San José	200 m
Gold medal – first place	2011 San José	4x100 m relay
Gold medal – first place	2010 Guatemala City	100 m
Gold medal – first place	2010 Guatemala City	200 m
Gold medal – first place	2009 Guatemala City	100 m
Silver medal – second place	2010 Guatemala City	4x400 m relay
Silver medal – second place	2005 San José	200 m
Bronze medal – third place	2010 Guatemala City	Long jump
Bronze medal – third place	2010 Guatemala City	4x100 m relay
Bronze medal – third place	2007 San José	100 m
Bronze medal – third place	2005 San José	400 m
- Updated on 26 July 2014

Kaina Darina Martinez (born 20 February 1986) is a Belizean athlete. She competed in 100 metres at the 2012 Summer Olympics in London. In 2017, she was named one of nine finalist for the NCAA Woman of the Year Award. Martinez was born in the Garifuna village of Seine Bight, Stann Creek District.

== Personal bests ==
- 100 m: 11.52 s (wind: +1.8 m/s) – Kingsville, Texas, 22 March 2014
- 200 m: 24.08 s (wind: +2.0 m/s) – Kingsville, Texas, 3 May 2014
- Long jump: 5.56 m (wind: +0.0 m/s) – Mayagüez, Puerto Rico, 30 July 2010

== Achievements ==
Year	Competition	Venue	Position	Event	Notes
Representing Belize
2003	Central American Junior Championships (U20)	San José, Costa Rica	2nd	100 m	12.92
2003	Central American Junior Championships (U20)	San José, Costa Rica	4th	200 m	26.84
2003	Central American Junior Championships (U20)	San José, Costa Rica	6th	Long jump	4.89 m
2004	Central American and Caribbean Junior Championships	Coatzacoalcos, Mexico	6th (h)	100 m	12.50 w (wind: +2.4 m/s)
2004	Central American and Caribbean Junior Championships	Coatzacoalcos, Mexico	7th (h)	200 m	26.60 w (wind: +2.8 m/s)
2005	Central American Championships	San José, Costa Rica	4th	100 m	12.73 (wind: -3.7 m/s)
2005	Central American Championships	San José, Costa Rica	2nd	200 m	25.56 (−1.5 m/s)
2005	Central American Championships	San José, Costa Rica	3rd	400 m	58.28
2005	Central American Championships	San José, Costa Rica	4th	4 × 100 m relay	49.06
2005	Central American Championships	San José, Costa Rica	4th	4 × 400 m relay	4:20.19
2006	NACAC U-23 Championships	Santo Domingo, Dominican Republic	5th (h)	100 m	12.70 (wind: +0.1 m/s)
2006	NACAC U-23 Championships	Santo Domingo, Dominican Republic	8th	200 m	26.59 (wind: +0.5 m/s)
2007	Central American Championships	San José, Costa Rica	3rd	100 m	12.47 (−0.8 m/s)
2007	Central American Championships	San José, Costa Rica	8th	400 m	1:12.66
2007	Central American Championships	San José, Costa Rica	5th	4 × 100 m relay	49.34
2007	NACAC Championships	San Salvador, El Salvador	12th (h)	200 m	25.90 (+2.7 m/s)
2007	Pan American Games	Rio de Janeiro, Brazil	23rd (h)	200 m	25.66 (+0.4 m/s)
2008	NACAC U-23 Championships	Toluca, Mexico	11th (h)	100m	12.31 (wind: +0.9 m/s) A
2008	NACAC U-23 Championships	Toluca, Mexico	8th	Long jump	5.16m (wind: NWI) A
2009	Central American Championships	Guatemala City, Guatemala	1st	100 m	11.98 CR (NWI)
2009	Central American Championships	Guatemala City, Guatemala	4th	200 m	25.21 (NWI)
2009	Central American and Caribbean Championships	Havana, Cuba	17th (h)	100 m	12.16
2010	Central American Games	Panama City, Panama	1st	100 m	12.05 (+0.2 m/s)
2010	Central American Games	Panama City, Panama	1st	200 m	24.89 (+0.5 m/s)
2010	Central American Games	Panama City, Panama	2nd	Long jump	5.49m (+0.9 m/s)
2010	Central American and Caribbean Games	Mayagüez, Puerto Rico	16th (h)	100 m	12.11 (+1.8 m/s)
2010	Central American and Caribbean Games	Mayagüez, Puerto Rico	9th (h)	200 m	25.17 (+0.9 m/s)
2010	Central American and Caribbean Games	Mayagüez, Puerto Rico	15th (q)	Long jump	5.56m
2010	Central American Championships	Guatemala City, Guatemala	1st	100 m	12.55 (−2.7 m/s)
2010	Central American Championships	Guatemala City, Guatemala	1st	200 m	25.54 (NWI)
2010	Central American Championships	Guatemala City, Guatemala	3rd	Long jump	5.48m (NWI)
2010	Central American Championships	Guatemala City, Guatemala	3rd	4 × 100 m relay	50.75
2010	Central American Championships	Guatemala City, Guatemala	2nd	4 × 400 m relay	4:27.26
2010	Commonwealth Games	Delhi, India	7th (h)	100 m	12.27
2010	Commonwealth Games	Delhi, India	5th (h)	200 m	25.65
2010	Commonwealth Games	Delhi, India	18th	Long jump	5.05m
2011	Central American Championships	San José, Costa Rica	1st	100 m	11.74 CR (−0.6 m/s)
2011	Central American Championships	San José, Costa Rica	1st	200 m	24.17 CR (−0.7 m/s)
2011	Central American Championships	San José, Costa Rica	5th	Long jump	5.49 m (wind: +1.1 m/s)
2011	Central American Championships	San José, Costa Rica	1st	4 × 100 m relay	48.50
2011	World Championships	Daegu, South Korea	42nd (h)	100 m	12.17 (+0.3 m/s)
2012	Olympic Games	London, United Kingdom	8th (qf)	100 m	11.89 (+1.3 m/s)
