= Eugène Muslar =

Belizean long-distance runner

Personal information
- Nationality: Belizean
- Born: 28 March 1959 (age 66)

Sport
- Sport: Long-distance running
- Event: Marathon

Eugène Muslar (born 28 March 1959) is a Belizean long-distance runner. He competed in the men's marathon at the 1988 Summer Olympics and the 1996 Summer Olympics. He also competed at the 1984 Summer Olympics. He has been described as the greatest long-distance runner in Belize history and he is their all-time best finisher at the Olympics.
