= Belize Olympic and Commonwealth Games Association =

National Olympic Committee and Commonwealth Games Association

Coordinates: 17.49300°N 88.18779°W

- Country: Belize
- Code: BIZ
- Created: 1967
- Recognized: 1967
- Continental Association: PASO
- Headquarters: Belize City, Belize
- President: Hilberto Martinez
- Secretary General: Allan Sharp
- Website: belizeolympic.org

The Belize Olympic and Commonwealth Games Association, formerly the British Honduras Olympic and Commonwealth Games Association (IOC code: BIZ), is the National Olympic Committee and Commonwealth Games Association of Belize, responsible for the country's representation at both the Olympic and Commonwealth Games.

== History ==
The British Honduras Olympic and Commonwealth Games Association was founded in 1967 and recognised that same year by the Commonwealth Games Federation, which had previously recognised the British Honduras Amateur Athletic Association (now the Belize Athletic Association). (Note: Though founding date given as 1967 by BOGCA 2022, 'About' page, para 2.) It was recognised the following year by the International Olympic Committee. In 1973, its name was changed to the Belize Olympic and Commonwealth Games Association.

The Association's most recent elections were held on 18 February 2017, with Hilberto Martinez and Allan Sharp assuming office as President and Secretary General, respectively.

== Activities ==
The Association is primarily responsible for funding athletes' training and travel to sporting competitions. In 2022, it commissioned the construction of Olympic House, which is partially meant to provide its affiliated sporting federations and athletes with office and training space.

=== Affiliated bodies ===
National sports governing bodies affiliated with the Belize Olympic and Commonwealth Games Association as of 2022.
Body	President	Notes
Belize Athletic Association	Deon Sutherland	–
Belize Basketball Federation	Paul Thompson	–
Belize Body Building & Fitness Federation	Mirna Paul-Greenidge	–
Belize Boxing Federation	Moses Sulph	–
Belize Canoe Association	Pamela Bradley	–
Cycling Federation of Belize	Orson Butler	–
Belize National Cricket Association	Roy A. Young	—
Belize National Fencing Association	Owen Meighan	–
Football Federation of Belize	Sergio Chuc	–
Judo Belize Federation	Franz Menzies	–
Belize Karate Federation	Herman Pastor Jr.	–
Belize Sailing Association	Sharon Hardwick	–
Belize Softball Federation	Jude Lizama	–
Belize Table Tennis Association	Arturo Vasquez	–
Belize Tennis Association	Edward Musa	–
Belize National Triathlon Association	Giovanni Alamilla	–
Belize Volleyball Association	Allan Sharp	–
Rugby Belize	Tony Gillings	–
Belize Sport Shooters Federation	–	suspended

== Controversies ==
The Association, deemed '[possibly] the most important sporting body in Belize,' has been criticised for defying 'every norm of democratic governance.' Its second President, Ned Pitts, held office 'for 42 years and did not face an open election in decades.' By 2013, it was claimed that 'no one can rightly recall when the last election was held.' (Note: The Association's most recent elections were held on 18 February 2017 (ANOC nd, table), 16 February 2013 (News 5 2013, para. 4, Amandala 2013, para. 1), and 1 July 1977 (Amandala 2013, last para.).)

== See also ==
- Belize at the Olympics
- Belize at the Commonwealth Games

== Notes and references ==
=== Full citations ===
1. "Belize Olympic & Commonwealth Games Association". Belize City: Belize Olympic and Commonwealth Games Association. 18 January 2017 – 31 January 2022.
2. "Belize Olympic and Commonwealth Games Association". Lausanne: International Olympic Committee.
3. "Belize Olympic and Commonwealth Games Association – Belize". Lausanne: Association of National Olympic Committees.
4. "Belize". Pall Mall: Commonwealth Games Federation. Archived from the original on 20 November 2022.
5. "Belize". Ashmore: Gold Coast 2018 Commonwealth Games Corp. Archived from the original on 20 November 2022.
6. "The First Election For Olympic Committee In Decades". News 5. Belize City: Great Belize Productions. 18 February 2013.
7. "The New Home of the Belize Olympic and Commonwealth Games Association". News 5. Belize City: Great Belize Productions. 6 June 2022.
8. "Olympic Committee holds elections". Amandala. Belize City. 22 February 2013.
9. Agboguin, Jacob B. (Spring 1970). A history of the British Commonwealth Games, 1930-1966 (MA thesis). Edmonton: University of Alberta. OCLC 1155967361.
