= Central American and Caribbean Athletic Confederation =

Sports Organization

Central American and Caribbean Athletic Confederation (CACAC)
- Formation: 1967
- Type: Sports federation
- Members: 34 member + 5 observer federations
- Official language: English and Spanish
- President: (Haiti) Alain Jean-Pierre

The Central American and Caribbean Athletic Confederation (CACAC) is a confederation governing body of athletics for national governing bodies and multi-national federations within Central America and the Caribbean. Membership of the Confederation is open to all national governing bodies for the sport of athletics in any country or territory in the region which is affiliated to World Athletics. Other countries may be granted observer status and may, with permission of the Congress, be allowed to compete in open championships. They will, however, not be entitled to vote at the Congress.

The Central American and Caribbean Athletic Confederation (CACAC) should not be confused with the North American, Central American and Caribbean Athletic Association (NACAC) established later in 1988, being one of the official area associations of World Athletics, and also including federations from Canada and the USA. CACAC considers NACAC as its parent organization, and the CACAC constitution regulates that the World Athletics Area Representative of NACAC is an ex-official member.

== History ==
With the initiative of the Mexican representative Carlos de Anda Dominguez, at the 10th Central American and Caribbean Games held in June 1966 in the city of San Juan, Puerto Rico, the need for the formation of a Central American and Caribbean Athletic Confederation was discussed as well as a proposal for organizing the first Central American and Caribbean Championships.

The first Championships were held on the 5th and 6 May 1967, in Xalapa, Mexico. Discussion about the formation of the Confederation was started at this time.

In Winnipeg, Canada, during the celebration of the V Pan American Games, a tentative constitution was approved, a permanent committee elected and the site of the second Central American and Caribbean Championships was awarded to Cali, Colombia, for August 1969, with Havana, Cuba, as the alternate site.

The Constitution was finally adopted on the occasion of the second Championships in August 1969. It has been revised and amended at General Assemblies in Guadalajara, Mexico, June 16, 1979; San Juan, Puerto Rico, July 5, 1979; Nassau, Bahamas, August 22, 1980; Santo Domingo, Dominican Republic, July 11, 1981; Maracaibo, Venezuela, August 18, 1998; Bridgetown, Barbados, June 27, 1999, San Juan, Puerto Rico, July 16, 2000, Bridgetown, Barbados, July 7, 2002, and San Salvador, El Salvador, December 4, 2002, Havana, Cuba, July 5, 2009, Santo Domingo 2010, Mayaguez 2010.

== Presidents ==
The current president of the confederation, Alain Jean-Pierre of Haiti was elected at the CACAC Congress held in San Salvador, El Salvador, in 2012. He follows Víctor López of Puerto Rico, who was elected firstly in Maracaibo, Venezuela, in 1998, and re-elected in Grenada in 2003, and in Cali, Colombia, in 2008.

Name	Nation	Presidency
Ricardo Gerónimo Pérez Sarría	Cuba	1967–1978
?		
Bernard J. Nottage	Bahamas	1982–1990
?		
Víctor López	Puerto Rico	1998–2012
Alain Jean-Pierre	Haiti	2012–present

== Competitions ==
CACAC organises five different championships: senior championships, junior championships, cross country championships, age group championships and under-17 (youth) championships.

- Central American and Caribbean Senior Championships
- Central American and Caribbean Junior/Youth Championships
- Central American and Caribbean Cross Country Championships
- Central American and Caribbean Age Group Championships

A Central American and Caribbean Half Marathon Cup was held once in Negril in 2005, incorporated into the Reggae Marathon in Jamaica, but did not get renewed after this debut event after only two nations entered.

2005 Central American and Caribbean Half Marathon Cup
Event	Gold		Silver		Bronze	
Men's half marathon	Wainard Talbert (JAM)	1:09:10	Shawn Pitter (JAM)	1:09:37	Richard Jones (TRI)	1:10:18
Women's half marathon	Tamica Thomas (JAM)	1:29:25	Merecia James (JAM)	1:29:37	Shermain Lasaldo (TRI)	1:31:45

== Member federations ==
CACAC consists of 34 member federations and 5 observer members: 29 of the member federations are members of NACAC (all NACAC members are represented except the federations from Canada and the USA), and 5 of the member federations are members of CONSUDATLE (Colombia, Guyana, Panama, Suriname, and Venezuela). The 5 observer members are non-World Athletics members.

Nation	Federation	Website
Anguilla	Anguilla Amateur Athletic Federation	http://www.freewebs.com/axathletics
Antigua and Barbuda	Athletic Association of Antigua & Barbuda	
Aruba	Arubaanse Atletiek Bond	https://web.archive.org/web/20110725014846/http://www.arubaathleticfederation.org/
Bahamas	Bahamas Association of Athletic Associations	https://web.archive.org/web/20110820094940/http://bahamastrack.com/
Barbados	Athletics Association of Barbados	http://www.aabarbados.com
Belize	Belize Amateur Athletic Association	
Bermuda	Bermuda National Athletics Association	https://web.archive.org/web/20130619210113/http://www.bnaa.bm/
British Virgin Islands	British Virgin Islands Athletics Association	http://bvi.milesplit.com
Cayman Islands	Cayman Islands Athletic Association	
Colombia	Federación Colombiana de Atletismo	http://www.fecodatle.org
Costa Rica	Federación Costarricense de Atletismo	http://www.fecoa.info
Cuba	Federación Cubana de Atletismo	
Dominica	Dominica Amateur Athletic Association	https://web.archive.org/web/20110719133147/http://www.daaa.dm/
Dominican Republic	Federación Dominicana de Asociaciones de Atletismo	https://fedoatletismo.org/
El Salvador	Federación Salvadoreña de Atletismo	
Grenada	Grenada Athletic Association	
Guatemala	Federación Nacional de Atletismo de Guatemala	http://www.atletismoguate.com
Guyana	Athletics Association of Guyana	
Haiti	Fédération Haïtienne d'Athlétisme Amateur	
Honduras	Federación Nacional Hondureña de Atletismo	http://condepah.org/dr
Jamaica	Jamaica Athletics Administrative Association	http://www.trackandfieldja.com
Mexico	Federación Mexicana de Asociaciones de Atletismo	http://www.fmaa.mx
Montserrat	Montserrat Amateur Athletic Association	
Nicaragua	Federación Nicaragüense de Atletismo	http://www.fna.org.ni
Panama	Federación Panameña de Atletismo	
Puerto Rico	Federación de Atletismo de Puerto Rico	http://www.atletismofapur.com
Saint Kitts and Nevis	Saint Kitts & Nevis Amateur Athletic Association	http://www.sknaaa.com
Saint Lucia	Saint Lucia Athletics Association	https://web.archive.org/web/20110904080543/http://saintluciatrackandfield.org/
Saint Vincent and the Grenadines	Team Athletics Saint Vincent & The Grenadines	http://www.svgnoc.org
Suriname	Surinaamse Atletiek Bond	http://suriname-athletics.org
Trinidad and Tobago	National Association of Athletics Administrations of Trinidad & Tobago	http://www.ttnaaa.org
Turks and Caicos Islands	Turks & Caicos Islands Amateur Athletic Association	
Venezuela	Federación Venezolana de Atletismo	https://web.archive.org/web/20111028030332/http://www.fva.cavillo.com.ve/
United States Virgin Islands	Virgin Islands Track & Field Federation	https://web.archive.org/web/20110728163412/http://virginislandstrackandfield.org/
Observer Members
Curaçao	Curaçaose Atletiek Bond	http://www.curacaoatletiekbond.com/
/French Guiana	Ligue d'Athlétisme de la Guyane	http://www.athle973.com
/Guadeloupe	Ligue Régionale d'Athlétisme de la Guadeloupe	http://liguegua.athle.com
Martinique	Ligue de Martinique d'Athlétisme	http://liguemque.athle.com
Sint Maarten	Sint Maarten Amateur Athletic Association	

== Former member associations ==
At their Council Meeting, the IAAF announced, that because the Netherlands Antilles has ceased to exist as a separate territory (one of 21 IAAF Members that are not countries but territories), athletes will not compete anymore as AHO but as Netherlands, and IAAF membership will drop from 213 to 212. The CACAC published the decision in their own newsletter. Curaçao, one of the five former island territories of the Netherlands Antilles, was invited as observer member.

== See also ==
- Association of Panamerican Athletics (APA)
- North American, Central American and Caribbean Athletic Association (NACAC)
- South American Athletics Confederation (CONSUDATLE)
- Central American Isthmus Athletic Confederation (CADICA)
