= El Salvador at the 2022 World Athletics Championships =

- Flag of El Salvador
- WA code: ESA

in Eugene, United States 15 July 2022 – 24 July 2022
- Competitors: 1 (1 man)
- Medals: Gold 0 Silver 0 Bronze 0 Total 0

World Athletics Championships appearances
- 1983; 1987; 1991; 1993; 1995; 1997; 1999; 2001; 2003; 2005; 2007; 2009; 2011; 2013; 2015; 2017; 2019; 2022; 2023; 2025

El Salvador competed at the 2022 World Athletics Championships in Eugene, Oregon, United States, which were held from 15 to 24 July 2022. The athlete delegation of the country was composed of one competitor, hurdler Pablo Andrés Ibáñez. At the World Championships, he competed in the men's 400 metres. There, he recorded a time of 50.18 seconds in the qualifying heats and placed sixth, failing to advance to the semifinals.

== Background ==
The 2022 World Athletics Championships in Eugene, Oregon, United States, were held from 15 to 24 July 2022. To qualify for the World Championships, athletes had to reach an entry standard (e.g. time and distance), place in a specific position at select competitions, be a wild card entry, or qualify through their World Athletics Ranking at the end of the qualification period.

As the El Salvador did not meet any of the four standards, they could send either one male or one female athlete in one event of the Championships who has not yet qualified. The Salvadoran Athletics Federation selected hurdler Pablo Andrés Ibáñez who held a personal best of 49.96 seconds and a season's best of 50.00 seconds in the men's 400 metres hurdles, his entered event. At the time of selection, he was unranked in the World Athletics Rankings.

== Results ==
Key

- Q = Qualified for the next round
- q = Qualified for the next round as a fastest loser or, in field events, by position without achieving the qualifying target
- NR = National record
- PB = Personal best
- SB = Season best
- N/A = Round not applicable for the event

=== Men ===
Ibáñez competed in the qualifying heats of the men's 400 metres hurdles on 16 July 2022 in the fifth heat against six other competitors. There, he recorded a time of 50.18 seconds and placed sixth, failing to advance to the semifinals as only the top three athletes of each heat and the next four fastest athletes would only be able to do so.

Track and road events

Athlete	Event	Heat		Semi-final		Final	
Athlete	Event	Result	Rank	Result	Rank	Result	Rank
Pablo Andrés Ibáñez	400 m hurdles	50.18	25	Did not advance			
