= El Salvador at the 2019 World Athletics Championships =

El Salvador at the 2019 World Championships in Athletics
- WA code: ESA

in Doha
- Competitors: 1 (1 man)
- Medals: Gold 0 Silver 0 Bronze 0 Total 0

World Championships in Athletics appearances
- 1983; 1987; 1991; 1993; 1995; 1997; 1999; 2001; 2003; 2005; 2007; 2009; 2011; 2013; 2015; 2017; 2019; 2022; 2023; 2025

El Salvador competed at the 2019 World Athletics Championships in Doha, Qatar, which were held from 27 September to 6 October 2019. The athlete delegation of the country was composed of one competitor, sprinter José Andrés Salazar who was selected by the Salvadoran Athletics Federation and would compete in the men's 200 metres. There, he placed sixth out of the seven competitors in his preliminary heat and did not advance further to the semifinals.

== Background ==
The 2019 World Athletics Championships in Doha, Qatar, were held from 27 September to 6 October 2019. The Championships were held at the Khalifa International Stadium. To qualify for the World Championships, athletes had to reach an entry standard (e.g. time or distance), place in a specific position at select competitions, be a wild card entry, or qualify through their World Athletics Ranking at the end of the qualification period.

As El Salvador did not meet any of the four standards, they could send either one male or one female athlete in one event of the Championships who has not yet qualified. The Salvadoran Athletics Federation selected sprinter José Andrés Salazar who would compete in the men's 200 metres. In the lead-up to the Championships, Salazar held a personal best of 21.23 seconds in the event.

== Result ==
Key

- Note–Ranks given for track events are for the entire round
- Q = Qualified for the next round
- q = Qualified for the next round as a fastest loser or, in field events, by position without achieving the qualifying target
- NR = National record
- GR = Games record
- PB = Personal best
- SB = Season best
- DNF = Did not finish
- DNS = Did not start
- NM = No mark
- N/A = Round not applicable for the event
- Bye = Athlete not required to compete in round

=== Men ===
Salazar competed in the qualifying heats of the men's 200 metres on 29 September in the second heat. He competed against six other competitors in the heat. There, he recorded a time of 21.64 seconds and placed sixth, failing to advance further to the semifinals held the following day.

Track and road events

Athlete	Event	Heat		Semifinal		Final	
Athlete	Event	Result	Rank	Result	Rank	Result	Rank
José Andrés Salazar	200 m	21.64	47	Did not advance			
