= LMA =

LMA may refer to:

== Medicine ==
- Laryngeal mask airway, a mask used in anaesthesia and emergency medicine

== Science ==
- Laban movement analysis, a language for describing, visualizing, interpreting and documenting human movement
- Land-mammal age
- Leaf mass per area, the inverse of Specific leaf area
- Levenberg–Marquardt algorithm, a mathematical procedure

== Organisations ==
- Ladies' Memorial Association, Southern local organizations dedicated to the Confederate dead
- League Managers Association, an organization representing managers of English football clubs
- Lebanese Muslim Association, Sydney, Australia
- Light Miniature Aircraft, an aircraft design firm based in Okeechobee, Florida, United States
- Ligue de Martinique d'Athlétisme, the governing body for the sport of athletics in Martinique
- Liverpool Media Academy, a media, music and performing arts college in Liverpool, England
- Loan Market Association, a UK-based organisation formed to support the secondary loan market in Europe
- Lockheed Martin Aerospace, formally Lockheed Martin Corporation, a major US aerospace corporation
- London Metropolitan Archives, the main repository for archives pertaining to Greater London

== Places ==
- Longwood Medical and Academic Area, Boston, United States
- Minchumina Airport, Alaska, United States

== Other ==
- LaMarcus Aldridge (born 1985), American former basketball player
- Late Middle Ages, a period in history
- Live Music Archive, a subsection of the Internet Archive
- Local marketing agreement, an agreement whereby an entity operates a broadcast media outlet licensed to a different owner
- Luftmine Typ A, a type of German WWII naval mine
