= Venezuelan Athletics Federation =

Sports national governing body

- Federación Venezolana de Atletismo
- Sport: Athletics
- Jurisdiction: Federation
- Abbreviation: FVA
- Affiliation: World Athletics
- Regional affiliation: CONSUDATLE
- Affiliation date: 1948
- Headquarters: Caracas
- President: Wilfredys León
- Vice president: Danisa Soldo
- Secretary: Marcos Oviedo
- (Venezuela)

The Venezuelan Athletics Federation (Spanish: Federación Venezolana de Atletismo, FVA) is the governing body for the sport of athletics in Venezuela. Current president is Wilfredys León. He took office in June 2010.

== History ==
FVA was founded in 1948.

== Affiliations ==
FVA is the national member federation for Venezuela in the following international organisations:

- World Athletics
- Confederación Sudamericana de Atletismo (CONSUDATLE; South American Athletics Confederation)
- Association of Panamerican Athletics (APA)
- Asociación Iberoamericana de Atletismo (AIA; Ibero-American Athletics Association)
- Central American and Caribbean Athletic Confederation (CACAC)

Moreover, it is part of the following national organisations:

- Venezuelan Olympic Committee (Spanish: Comité Olímpico Venezolano)

== Members ==
FVA comprises the 23 regional associations (plus capital district) of Venezuela.

State	Organisation	Link
Amazonas	Asociación de Atletismo del Estado Amazonas	
Anzoátegui	Asociación de Atletismo del Estado Anzoátegui	
Apure	Asociación de Atletismo del Estado Apure	
Aragua	Asociación de Atletismo del Estado Aragua	
Barinas	Asociación de Atletismo del Estado Barinas	
Bolívar	Asociación de Atletismo del Estado Bolívar	
Carabobo	Asociación Carabobeña de Atletismo	
Cojedes	Asociación de Atletismo del Estado Cojedes	
Delta Amacuro	Asociación de Atletismo Delta Amacuro	
Distrito Capital	Asociación de Atletismo del Distrito Capital	
Falcón	Asociación Falconiana de Atletismo	
Guárico	Asociación de Atletismo del Estado Guárico	
Lara	Asociación de Atletismo del Estado Lara	
Mérida	Asociación Merideña de Atletismo	
Miranda	Asociación de Atletismo del Estado Miranda	
Monagas	Asociación de Atletismo del Estado Monagas	
Nueva Esparta	Asociación de Atletismo del Estado Nueva Esparta	
Portuguesa	Asociación de Atletismo del Estado Portuguesa	
Sucre	Asociación de Atletismo del Estado Sucre	
Táchira	Asociación Tachirense de Atletismo	www.atletismotachira.com
Trujillo	Asociación Trujillana de Atletismo	
Vargas	Asociación de Atletismo del Estado Vargas	
Yaracuy	Asociación del Estado Yaracuy	
Zulia	Asociación de Atletismo del Estado Zulia	

== National records ==
FVA maintains the Venezuelan records in athletics.
