= Guatemalan Athletics Federation =

Governing body for the sport of athletics in Guatemala

- Federación Nacional de Atletismo de Guatemala
- Sport: Athletics
- Jurisdiction: Federation
- Abbreviation: FNA
- Founded: 1945
- Affiliation: IAAF
- Regional affiliation: NACAC
- Headquarters: Ciudad de Guatemala
- President: Max Leonel Mollinedo Ticas
- Secretary: Nery Fernando Arango Dominguez

Official website
- www.atletismoguatemala.com
- (Guatemala)

The Guatemalan Athletics Federation (Spanish: Federación Nacional de Atletismo de Guatemala, FNA) is the governing body for the sport of athletics in Guatemala. Current president is Max Leonel Mollinedo Ticas (2018-2022).

== History ==
FNA was founded in 1945.

== Affiliations ==
FNA is the national member federation for Guatemala in the following international organisations:

- International Association of Athletics Federations (IAAF)
- North American, Central American and Caribbean Athletic Association (NACAC)
- Association of Panamerican Athletics (APA)
- Asociación Iberoamericana de Atletismo (AIA; Ibero-American Athletics Association)
- Central American and Caribbean Athletic Confederation (CACAC)
- Confederación Atlética del Istmo Centroamericano (CADICA; Central American Isthmus Athletic Confederation)

Moreover, it is part of the following national organisations:

- Guatemalan Olympic Committee (COG; Spanish: Comité Olímpico Guatemalteco)

== Members ==
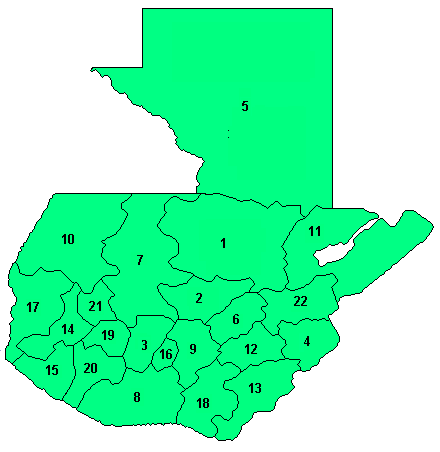

FNA comprises the departmental associations of Guatemala.

Number	State	Organisation	Link
1	Alta Verapaz	Asociación Deportiva Departamental de Alta Verapaz	
2	Baja Verapaz	Asociación Deportiva Departamental de Baja Verapaz	
3	Chimaltenango	Asociación Deportiva Departamental de Chimaltenango	
4	Chiquimula	Asociación Deportiva Departamental de Chiquimula	
6	El Progreso	Asociación Deportiva Departamental de El Progreso	
8	Escuintla	Asociación Deportiva Departamental de Escuintla	
9	Guatemala	Asociación Deportiva Departamental de Guatemala	
10	Huehuetenango	Asociación Deportiva Departamental de Huehuetenango	
11	Izabal	Asociación Deportiva Departamental de Izabal	
12	Jalapa	Asociación Deportiva Departamental de Jalapa	
13	Jutiapa	Asociación Deportiva Departamental de Jutiapa	
5	Petén	Asociación Deportiva Departamental de Petén	
14	Quetzaltenango	Asociación Deportiva Departamental de Quetzaltenango	
7	Quiché	Asociación Deportiva Departamental de Quiché	
15	Retalhuleu	Asociación Deportiva Departamental de Retalhuleu	
16	Sacatepéquez	Asociación Deportiva Departamental de Sacatepéquez	
17	San Marcos	Asociación Deportiva Departamental de San Marcos	
18	Santa Rosa	Asociación Deportiva Departamental de Santa Rosa	
19	Sololá	Asociación Deportiva Departamental de Sololá	
20	Suchitepéquez	Asociación Deportiva Departamental de Suchitepéquez	
21	Totonicapán	Asociación Deportiva Departamental de Totonicapán	
22	Zacapa	Asociación Deportiva Departamental de Zacapa	

== National records ==
FNA maintains the Guatemalan records in athletics.
