= Argentine Athletics Confederation =

Sports governing body in Argentina

- Sport: Athletics
- Jurisdiction: Confederation
- Abbreviation: CADA
- Founded: September 19, 1954
- Affiliation: World Athletics
- Regional affiliation: CONSUDATLE
- Affiliation date: May 24, 1918
- Headquarters: Santa Fe
- President: Daniel Marcelino Sotto
- Secretary: German Paternoster
- Replaced: Federación Atlética Argentina
- (founded): July 4, 1919

Official website
- www.cada-atletismo.com
- (Argentina)

The Argentine Athletics Confederation (CADA; Spanish: Confederación Argentina de Atletismo) is the national governing body for the sport of athletics in Argentina. Its current president is Daniel Marcelino Sotto. In the 2009–2013 period, the president was Juan Alberto Scarpín. He took office in September 2008 after the death of former president Hugo La Nasa, and was elected in April 2009 for the period 2009-2013.

== History ==
CADA was founded on September 19, 1954. It replaced the Federación Atlética Argentina, which was founded on July 4, 1919. The latter followed the Fundación Pedestre Argentina, which was founded on February 13, 1911, and was founder member of the CONSUDATLE on May 24, 1918, in Buenos Aires.

== Affiliations ==
CADA is the national member federation for Argentina in the following international organisations:

- World Athletics
- Confederación Sudamericana de Atletismo (CONSUDATLE; South American Athletics Confederation)
- Association of Panamerican Athletics (APA)
- Asociación Iberoamericana de Atletismo (AIA; Ibero-American Athletics Association)

Moreover, it is part of the following national organisations:

- Comité Olímpico Argentino

== Member federations ==
CADA comprises the athletics federations of the Argentinian provinces.

| State | Organisation | Link |
|---|---|---|
| Buenos Aires | Federación Atlética de la Provincia de Buenos Aires | |
| Catamarca | Federación Catamarqueña de Atletismo | |
| Chaco | Federación Chaqueña de Atletismo | |
| Chubut | Federación de Atletismo del Chubut | |
| Córdoba | Federación Atlética Cordobesa | www.facordobesa.org.ar |
| Corrientes | Federación Correntina de Atletismo | |
| Entre Ríos | Federación Atlética de Entre Ríos | |
| Formosa | Federación Formoseña de Atletismo | |
| Gran Buenos Aires | Federación Atlética Metropolitana | www.webfam.com.ar |
| Jujuy | Federación Jujeña de Atletismo | |
| La Pampa | Federación Atlética Pampeana | |
| La Rioja | Federación Riojana de Atletismo | |
| Mendoza | Asociación Mendocina de Atletismo | www.ama-mza.com.ar |
| Misiones | Federación Misionera de Atletismo | |
| Neuquén | Federación Atlética Neuquina | |
| Río Negro | Federación Atlética de Rio Negro | |
| Salta | Federación Atlética Salteña | www.atletismosalta.com.ar |
| San Juan | Federación Atlética Sanjuanina | |
| San Luis | Federación Atlética Sanluiseña | |
| Santa Cruz | Federación Atlética de Santa Cruz | |
| Santa Fe | Federación Santafesina de Atletismo | |
| Santiago del Estero | Federación Santiagueña De Atletismo | |
| Tierra del Fuego | Asociación Atlética de Tierra Del Fuego | |
| Tucumán | Federación Tucumana de Atletismo | www.ftatucuman.com.ar |

== National records ==
CADA maintains the Argentine records in athletics.
