= Montserrat Amateur Athletic Association =

Governing body for athletics in Montserrat

- Sport: Athletics
- Jurisdiction: Association
- Abbreviation: MAAA
- Founded: 1971
- Affiliation: IAAF
- Affiliation date: 1974
- Regional affiliation: NACAC
- Headquarters: Brades
- President: Bruce Farara
- Secretary: Stephen Mendes
- (Montserrat)

The Montserrat Amateur Athletic Association (MAAA) is the governing body for the sport of athletics in Montserrat. Current president is Bruce Farara. It is also the body responsible for Montserrat's representation at the Commonwealth Games.

== History ==
MAAA was founded in 1971 and was affiliated to the IAAF in 1974.

== Affiliations ==
MAAA is the national member federation for Montserrat in the following international organisations:

- International Association of Athletics Federations (IAAF)
- North American, Central American and Caribbean Athletic Association (NACAC)
- Association of Panamerican Athletics (APA)
- Central American and Caribbean Athletic Confederation (CACAC)
- Leeward Islands Athletics Association (LIAA)

== National records ==
MAAA maintains the Montserrat records in athletics.

== See also ==
- Montserrat at the Commonwealth Games
