= Belize Athletic Association =

Governing body for athletics in Belize

- Sport: Athletics
- Jurisdiction: Association
- Abbreviation: BAA
- Founded: 1956
- Affiliation: IAAF
- Affiliation date: 1962
- Regional affiliation: NACAC
- Headquarters: Belize City
- President: Hugh Staine
- Vice president(s): Dylan Jones; Jaheed Smith
- Secretary: Liesje Chung-Barrow
- (Belize)

The Belize Athletic Association (BAA) is the governing body for the sport of athletics in Belize.

== History ==
BAA was founded in 1956 as Belize Amateur Athletic Association (BAAA). In 2013, the name was changed to Belize Athletic Association.

In August 2010, Ian Gray was elected as new president. However, there was an ongoing internal dispute between board officials claiming the lead of BAAA leading to the executive been dissolved by the IAAF. In October 2013, a new executive was elected with Hugh ”Pinas” Staine as new president.

== Affiliations ==
BAA is the national member federation for Belize in the following international organisations:

- International Association of Athletics Federations (IAAF)
- North American, Central American and Caribbean Athletic Association (NACAC)
- Association of Panamerican Athletics (APA)
- Central American and Caribbean Athletic Confederation (CACAC)
- Confederación Atlética del Istmo Centroamericano (CADICA; Central American Isthmus Athletic Confederation)

Moreover, it is part of the following national organisations:

- Belize Olympic and Commonwealth Games Association

== National records ==
BAA maintains the Belizean records in athletics.
