= Carlos de Anda =

Mexican sprinter (1908–1995)

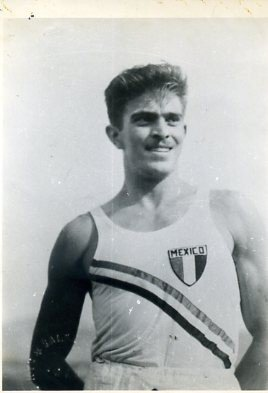
Held Mexican National record for 32 years

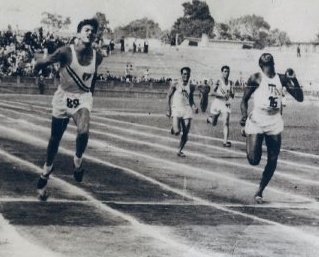
Carlos de Anda Dominguez at Central American and Caribbean Games (CAC or CACGs)

Carlos de Anda Dominguez (March 12, 1908 – August 30, 1995) was a Mexican accomplished sprinter who competed internationally, eventually reaching the 1932 Summer Olympics, and qualifying for the 1936 Summer Olympics.

== Early life ==
Carlos de Anda Dominguez was born in 1908, during the Mexican Revolution. His family struggled as they were robbed by the government through corruption and dirty politics, but during a turbulent childhood and with the support of his mother, he found physical and mental refuge in sports. He became an accomplished platform diver by high school and became a member of the Mexico National team. He became a runner shortly thereafter, a sport that became his passion.

== Athletics career ==
Carlos de Anda Dominguez participated in the Central American and Caribbean Games competitions in Havana, Cuba, and San Salvador in 1935, where he set a record that lasted 28 years. Carlos de Anda Dominguez also set a Mexican national record of 48.1 seconds in the 400 dash in 1931, a record that remained unbroken for 32 years. He participated in the 1932 Summer Olympics, and qualified for the 1936 Summer Olympics, even though he retired from track and field in order to focus on work and family.

As a Mexican representative, at the 10th Central American and Caribbean Games held in June 1966 in the city of San Juan, Puerto Rico, Carlos de Anda Dominguez discussed the need to form a Central American and Caribbean Athletic Confederation and proposed organizing the first Central American and Caribbean Championships. The first Championships were held on the 5th and 6 May 1967, in Jalapa, Veracruz, Mexico. During the celebration of the V Pan American Games in Winnipeg, Canada, a tentative constitution was approved, a permanent committee elected, and the site of the second Central American and Caribbean Championships was awarded to Cali, Colombia, for August 1969, with Havanna, Cuba, as the alternate site. The Constitution was finally adopted on the occasion of the second Championships in August 1969. It has been revised and amended at General Assemblies in Guadalajara, Mexico, June 16, 1979; San Juan, Puerto Rico, July 5, 1979; Nassau, Bahamas, August 22, 1980; Santo Domingo, Dominican Republic, July 11, 1981; Maracaibo, Venezuela, August 18, 1998; Bridgetown, Barbados, June 27, 1999, San Juan, Puerto Rico, July 16, 2000, Bridgetown, Barbados, July 7, 2002 and San Salvador, El Salvador, December 4, 2002, Habana, Cuba, July 5, 2009, Santo Domingo 2010, Mayaguez 2010.

Throughout his track and field career, Carlos de Anda Dominguez competed and won various meets in the pentathlon (100 meters, 1,500 meters, javelin, high jump, and shot-put.) He played and competed in racket ball, baseball, boxing, tennis, American football, football soccer, and was part of the Chihuahua state champion team in volleyball. Later in life he took on archery and became senior national champion. The last race he participated in was a half marathon, which he won, at the age of 75.

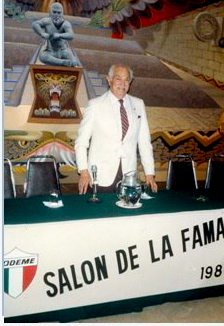
At the Hall of Fame of CODEME (Mexican Sports Confederation) since 1982. Recognized award given to athletes whose sporting excellence is example of perseverance, dedication and discipline.

After his retirement, he served as President of the Mexican Federation of Athletics. As an active member of the International Federation of Track and Field he was elected to be a judge at the 1968 Summer Olympics in Mexico City, Mexico. Carlos de Anda Dominguez was elected head of the Mexican delegation during the 1967 Panamerican Games in Winnipeg, Canada, as well as the 1964 Summer Olympics in Tokyo, Japan. Carlos de Anda Dominguez was a member of the Mexican Olympic Committee from 1964 until his death in 1995. He was recognized by the Mexican Federation of Athletics in 1982, when his name was entered into the Hall of Fame of CODEME (Mexican Sports Confederation). This recognition and award is given to select athletes whose sporting excellence is example of perseverance, dedication and discipline.

== Professional life ==
Beyond his accomplishments in athletics, Carlos de Anda Dominguez had an admirable work career. At a young age he took an interest in mathematics and studied accounting. Wanting to have a university degree in math (a degree that didn’t exist in Mexico at that time), he formed the Mexican Mathematics Foundation and became one of the first seven people in the country to earn a degree in Mathematics. Still in love with numbers, later in life he became General Director of La Nacional Compañía de Seguros, S.A, and in 1951 he started his own insurance company, Seguros La Colonial in the city of Chihuahua, which in 1959 by the President of Mexico, Adolfo López Mateos became La Aseguradora Hidalgo, S.A., one of the largest insurance companies in the country, and the only government owned insurance company in México. When he retired, he dedicated his time to write about his great grandmother, Josefa Ortiz de Domínguez, an influential woman in Mexico's history who was married to a powerful governor of the state of Querétaro. She, along with most of the leaders of the Mexican Revolution collaborated in the planning and execution of the Mexican Independence movement, which resulted in Mexico’s independence from Spain on September 16, 1810. Her name is in the books as one of the most influential female politicians in the history of the country.
