= Nicaraguan Athletics Federation =

Governing body for athletics in Nicaragua

- Federación Nicaragüense de Atletismo
- Sport: Athletics
- Jurisdiction: Federation
- Abbreviation: FNA
- Founded: 1954
- Affiliation: IAAF
- Regional affiliation: NACAC
- Headquarters: Managua
- President: Xiomara Larios
- Vice president: Onel Pérez
- Secretary: María Antonieta Ocón

Official website
- atletismonicaragua.revsys.net
- (Nicaragua)

The Nicaraguan Athletics Federation (Spanish: Federación Nicaragüense de Atletismo, FNA) is the governing body for the sport of athletics in Nicaragua. It was founded in 1954. The president is Xiomara Larios. She was re-elected in December 2012.

== Affiliations ==
FNA is the national member federation for Nicaragua in the following international organisations:

- International Association of Athletics Federations (IAAF)
- North American, Central American and Caribbean Athletic Association (NACAC)
- Association of Panamerican Athletics (APA)
- Asociación Iberoamericana de Atletismo (AIA; Ibero-American Athletics Association)
- Central American and Caribbean Athletic Confederation (CACAC)
- Confederación Atlética del Istmo Centroamericano (CADICA; Central American Isthmus Athletic Confederation)

Also, it is part of the following national organisations:

- Nicaraguan National Olympic Committee (CON; Spanish: Comité Olímpico Nacional de Nicaragua)

== National records ==
FNA maintains the Nicaraguan records in athletics.
