= Athletics Association of Guyana =

Sports governing body in Guyana

- Sport: Athletics
- Jurisdiction: Association
- Abbreviation: AAG
- Founded: 1948
- Affiliation: World Athletics
- Regional affiliation: CONSUDATLE

Official website
- athleticsguyana.org
- (Guyana)

The Athletics Association of Guyana (AAG) is the governing body for the sport of athletics in Guyana. Current president is Aubrey Hutson. He was elected in 2013.

== History ==
AAG was founded in 1948.

Until 2013 Colin Boyce served as president. He was elected in 2009.

== Affiliations ==
AAG is the national member federation for Guyana in the following international organisations:

- World Athletics
- Confederación Sudamericana de Atletismo (CONSUDATLE; South American Athletics Confederation)
- Association of Panamerican Athletics (APA)
- Central American and Caribbean Athletic Confederation (CACAC)

Moreover, it is part of the following national organisations:

- Guyana Olympic Association

== National records ==
AAG maintains the Guyanese records in athletics.
