= Uruguayan Athletics Confederation =

Sports governing body in Uruguay

- Sport: Athletics
- Jurisdiction: Confederation
- Abbreviation: CAU
- Founded: March 1, 1918
- Affiliation: World Athletics
- Regional affiliation: CONSUDATLE
- Affiliation date: May 24, 1918
- Headquarters: Montevideo
- President: Marcos Melazzi
- Vice president: Déborah Gyurcsek
- Secretary: Iván García
- Replaced: Federación Atlética del Uruguay

Official website
- confederacionatletica.org
- (Uruguay)

The Uruguayan Athletics Confederation (Spanish: Confederación Atlética del Uruguay, CAU) is the governing body for the sport of athletics in Uruguay. As of 2019, Its president is Marcos Melazzi.

== History ==
CAU was founded on March 1, 1918, as Federación Atlética del Uruguay (Uruguayan Athletics Federation), and was later renamed to Confederación Atlética del Uruguay on May 23, 1938. It was one of three founder members of the CONSUDATLE on May 24, 1918, in Buenos Aires, Argentina. Many of its national events are held at the Pista de Atletismo Darwin Piñeyrúa.

== Affiliations ==
CAU is the national member federation for Uruguay in the following international organisations:

- World Athletics
- Confederación Sudamericana de Atletismo (CONSUDATLE; South American Athletics Confederation)
- Association of Panamerican Athletics (APA)
- Asociación Iberoamericana de Atletismo (AIA; Ibero-American Athletics Association)
- International Association of Ultrarunners (IAU)

Moreover, it is part of the following national organisations:

- Uruguayan Olympic Committee (COU; Comité Olímpico Uruguayo)
- Confederación Uruguaya de Deportes (CUD; Uruguayan Sports Confederation)

== Members ==
CAU comprises the departmental federations, regional associations, and clubs that practice the sport of athletics.

== National records ==
CAU maintains the Uruguayan records in athletics.
