= Saint Lucia Athletics Association =

Governing body for athletics in Saint Lucia

St. Lucia Athletics Association
- Sport: Athletics
- Jurisdiction: Federation
- Abbreviation: SLAA
- Founded: 1977
- Affiliation: World Athletics
- Affiliation date: 1978
- Regional affiliation: NACAC
- Headquarters: Castries
- President: Dora Henry
- Secretary: Erasmus Wayne Benti
- Replaced: Saint Lucia Amateur Athletics Association

Official website
- www.athleticsstlucia.org
- (Saint Lucia)

The St. Lucia Athletics Association (SLAA) is the national governing body for athletics in Saint Lucia, inclusive of track and field, cross country running, road running and racewalking. The Athletics Association was formerly known as the St. Lucia Amateur Athletics Association. The organisation was founded in 1977 to promote Track and Field in Saint Lucia. In 1978 the SLAA became an affiliate member of the world governing body for athletics, then called the International Amateur Athletics Federation, later known as the International Association of Athletics Federations and now world Athletics.

Based at Olympic House on Barnard Hill in Castries, the SLAA is a non-profit organisation, led by President, Dora Henry, elected at a Biennial General Meeting of the organisation in 2024. Ms. Henry replaced Brendaline Descartes, who had served from 2022 - 20224. Ms. Henry served as the 1st Vice President in the previous administration. The SLAA is involved in many aspects of the sport at the local, national, and international level - coaching education, sports science and athlete development, youth programmes and masters (age 40+) competition.

== Data ==
Mailing Address:GM 697 Gable Woods Mall, Castries, St. Lucia, West Indies

President: Ms. Dora Henry

Secretary: Erasmus Wayne Benti

Physical Address: Olympic House, Barnard Hill, Castries, St. Lucia, West Indies

== History ==
SLAA was founded as St. Lucia Amateur Athletic Association in 1977 and was affiliated to the IAAF in 1978.

== Affiliations ==
SLAA is the national member federation for Saint Lucia in the following international organisations:

- International Association of Athletics Federations (IAAF)
- North American, Central American and Caribbean Athletic Association (NACAC)
- Association of Panamerican Athletics (APA)
- Central American and Caribbean Athletic Confederation (CACAC)

Moreover, it is part of the following national organisations:

- Saint Lucia Olympic Committee (SLOC)

== National records ==
SLAA maintains the Saint Lucian records in athletics.
