= North American, Central American and Caribbean Athletic Association =

Athletics governing body

North American, Central American and Caribbean Athletic Association (NACAC)
- NACAC logo
- Formation: 1988
- Type: Sports federation
- Headquarters: Nassau, Bahamas
- Members: 31 member federations
- Official language: English and Spanish
- President: Mike Sands
- Website: AthleticsNACAC.org

The North American, Central American and Caribbean Athletic Association (NACAC) is the continental confederation governing body of athletics for national governing bodies and multi-national federations within Northern America, Central America, and the Caribbean. NACAC is one of six area associations of World Athletics (WA), previously named the International Association of Athletics Federations (IAAF). NACAC was founded on December 10, 1988, in San Juan, Puerto Rico.

== Presidents ==
Amadeo Francis of Puerto Rico was elected as the first president of the association. He was re-elected in 1999 and 2003. In 2007 Neville "Teddy" McCook (Jamaica) was elected as new president and was re-elected in 2011. After McCook died on February 11, 2013, Alain Jean-Pierre from Haiti, treasurer of NACAC and president of the Central American and Caribbean Athletic Confederation (CACAC), acted as interim president. On August 7, 2013, Víctor López from Puerto Rico, president of the Association of Panamerican Athletics (APA), was elected new president for the period 2013–2019. On July 2, 2019, during the NACAC Congress held in Querétaro, Mexico Mike Sands of Bahamas was elected president for the period 2019-2022.

Name	Nation	Presidency
Amadeo Francis	Puerto Rico	1988–2007
Neville McCook	Jamaica	2007–2013
Alain Jean-Pierre	Haiti	2013 (interim)
Víctor López	Puerto Rico	2013–2019
Mike Sands	Bahamas	2019–2026

== Competitions ==
- NACAC Senior Championships
- NACAC U23 Championships
- NACAC U18 Championships
- NACAC U13-U15 Championships
- NACAC Cross Country Championships
- NACAC Race Walking Championships
- NACAC Mountain Running Championships
- Pan American Combined Events Cup (organised by the Association of Panamerican Athletics (APA), formerly: NACAC Combined Events Championships)
- Central American and Caribbean Championships (organised by the Central American and Caribbean Athletic Confederation (CACAC))

== Member associations ==
Nation	Association
Anguilla	Anguilla Amateur Athletic Federation
Antigua and Barbuda	Antigua & Barbuda Athletic Association
Aruba	Aruba Athletic Federation
Bahamas	Bahamas Association of Athletic Associations
Barbados	Athletics Association of Barbados
Belize	Belize Athletic Association
Bermuda	Bermuda National Athletics Association
British Virgin Islands	British Virgin Islands Athletics Association
Canada	Athletics Canada
Cayman Islands	Cayman Islands Athletic Association
Costa Rica	Costa Rican Athletics Federation
Cuba	Cuban Athletics Federation
Dominica	Dominica Amateur Athletic Association
Dominican Republic	Athletics Federation of the Dominican Republic
El Salvador	Salvadoran Athletics Federation
Grenada	Grenada Athletic Association
Guatemala	Guatemalan Athletics Federation
Haiti	Haitian Amateur Athletic Federation
Honduras	Honduran National Athletics Federation
Jamaica	Jamaica Athletics Administrative Association
Mexico	Federation of Mexican Athletics Associations
Montserrat	Montserrat Amateur Athletic Association
Nicaragua	Nicaraguan Athletics Federation
Puerto Rico	Puerto Rican Athletics Federation
Saint Kitts and Nevis	St. Kitts Nevis Athletics
Saint Lucia	Saint Lucia Athletics Association
Saint Vincent and the Grenadines	Team Athletics Saint Vincent & The Grenadines
Trinidad and Tobago	National Association of Athletics Administrations of Trinidad & Tobago
Turks and Caicos Islands	Turks & Caicos Islands Amateur Athletic Association
United States	USA Track & Field
United States Virgin Islands	Virgin Islands Track & Field Federation

== See also ==
- Association of Panamerican Athletics (APA)
- Central American and Caribbean Athletic Confederation (CACAC)
- Central American Isthmus Athletic Confederation (CADICA)
- South American Athletics
