= Association of Panamerican Athletics =

Regional governing body for athletics in the Americas

APA
- Formation: 2011
- Type: Sports federation
- Members: 44 member federations
- President: (Puerto Rico) Víctor López
- Website: www.athleticspanam.com

The Association of Panamerican Athletics (APA; Spanish: Asociación Panamericana de Atletismo) is a new regional confederation governing body of athletics for national governing bodies and multi-national federations within Northern, Central, and South America, and the Caribbean, replacing the Pan American Athletics Commission.

The organization was founded on October 28, 2011, during the XVI Pan American Games in Guadalajara, Jalisco, Mexico. The inaugural president is Víctor López from Puerto Rico, former president of the Central American and Caribbean Athletic Confederation (CACAC).

== Championships ==
APA organizes the following championships and cups:

- Pan American Championships in Athletics
- Pan American U20 Athletics Championships
- Pan American Youth Championships
- Pan American Marathon Championships
- Pan American Cross Country Cup
- Pan American Combined Events Cup
- Pan American Race Walking Cup

== Member associations ==
Due to the constitution, membership in the Association shall consist of World Athletics member federations which are affiliated members of NACAC and CONSUDATLE as ratified by World Athletics. At this time, APA consists of 44 member federations, 31 of them are member of NACAC, while 13 are member of CONSUDATLE. This means that the APA also comprises the 3 IAAF members without a recognized National Olympic Committee that are therefore no member of the Pan American Sports Organization namely Anguilla, Montserrat, and the Turks and Caicos Islands.

| Nation | Association | Website |
|---|---|---|
| Anguilla | Anguilla Amateur Athletic Federation | http://www.freewebs.com/axathletics |
| Antigua and Barbuda | Athletic Association of Antigua & Barbuda | |
| Argentina | Confederación Argentina de Atletismo | http://www.cada-atletismo.org/ |
| Aruba | Arubaanse Atletiek Bond | https://web.archive.org/web/20110725014846/http://www.arubaathleticfederation.org/ |
| Bahamas | Bahamas Association of Athletic Associations | https://web.archive.org/web/20110820094940/http://bahamastrack.com/ |
| Barbados | Athletics Association of Barbados | https://aabarbados.com/ |
| Belize | Belize Amateur Athletic Association | https://web.archive.org/web/20120228022743/http://www.belizeathletics.org.bz/ |
| Bermuda | Bermuda National Athletics Association | https://web.archive.org/web/20130619210113/http://www.bnaa.bm/ |
| Bolivia | Federación Atlética de Bolivia | https://web.archive.org/web/20191004002933/http://federacionatleticadebolivia.com/ |
| Brazil | Confederação Brasileira de Atletismo | http://www.cbat.org.br/ |
| British Virgin Islands | British Virgin Islands Athletics Association | http://bvi.milesplit.com/ |
| Canada | Athletics Canada | http://www.athletics.ca/ |
| Cayman Islands | Cayman Islands Athletic Association | |
| Chile | Federación Atlética de Chile | https://www.fedachi.cl/ |
| Colombia | Federación Colombiana de Atletismo | http://www.fecodatle.org/ |
| Costa Rica | Federación Costarricense de Atletismo | https://web.archive.org/web/20130407151930/http://www.fecoa.info/ |
| Cuba | Federación Cubana de Atletismo | |
| Dominica | Dominica Amateur Athletic Association | https://web.archive.org/web/20110719133147/http://www.daaa.dm/ |
| Dominican Republic | Federación Dominicana de Asociaciones de Atletismo | https://web.archive.org/web/20190702044949/http://www.fedomatle.org/ |
| Ecuador | Federación Ecuatoriana de Atletismo | http://www.coe.org.ec/ |
| El Salvador | Federación Salvadoreña de Atletismo | https://www.atletismoelsalvador.org/ |
| Grenada | Grenada Athletic Association | |
| Guatemala | Federación Nacional de Atletismo de Guatemala | http://www.atletismoguate.com/ |
| Guyana | Athletics Association of Guyana | |
| Haiti | Fédération Haïtienne d'Athlétisme Amateur | |
| Honduras | Federación Nacional Hondureña de Atletismo | |
| Jamaica | Jamaica Athletics Administrative Association | http://www.trackandfieldja.com/ |
| Mexico | Federación Mexicana de Asociaciones de Atletismo | http://www.fmaa.mx/ |
| Montserrat | Montserrat Amateur Athletic Association | |
| Nicaragua | Federación Nicaragüense de Atletismo | https://web.archive.org/web/20120513105035/http://www.fna.org.ni/ |
| Panama | Federación Panameña de Atletismo | |
| Paraguay | Federación Paraguaya de Atletismo | https://web.archive.org/web/20090221100826/http://www.fpa.com.py/ |
| Peru | Federación Deportiva Peruana de Atletismo | https://web.archive.org/web/20180806151931/http://fepeatle.com/ |
| Puerto Rico | Federación de Atletismo de Puerto Rico | https://www.atletismofapur.com/ |
| Saint Kitts and Nevis | Saint Kitts & Nevis Amateur Athletic Association | https://www.sknaaa.com/ |
| Saint Lucia | Saint Lucia Athletics Association | https://web.archive.org/web/20110904080543/http://saintluciatrackandfield.org/ |
| Saint Vincent and the Grenadines | Team Athletics Saint Vincent & The Grenadines | https://www.svgnoc.org/ |
| Suriname | Surinaamse Atletiek Bond | http://suriname-athletics.org/wp |
| Trinidad and Tobago | National Association of Athletics Administrations of Trinidad & Tobago | https://www.ttnaaa.org/ |
| Turks and Caicos Islands | Turks & Caicos Islands Amateur Athletic Association | |
| United States | USA Track & Field | http://www.usatf.org/ |
| United States Virgin Islands | Virgin Islands Track & Field Federation | https://web.archive.org/web/20110728163412/http://virginislandstrackandfield.org/ |
| Uruguay | Confederación Atlética del Uruguay | https://web.archive.org/web/20090402050918/http://www.atlecau.org.uy/ |
| Venezuela | Federación Venezolana de Atletismo | https://web.archive.org/web/20080517165012/http://www.feveatletismo.org.ve/ |

== See also ==
- North American, Central American and Caribbean Athletic Association (NACAC)
- South American Athletics Confederation (CONSUDATLE)
- Central American and Caribbean Athletic Confederation (CACAC)
- Central American Isthmus Athletic Confederation (CADICA)
