= Cuban Athletics Federation =

Sports governing body in Cuba

- Federación Cubana de Atletismo
- Sport: Athletics
- Jurisdiction: Federation
- Abbreviation: FCA
- Founded: March 22, 1922; 104 years ago
- Affiliation: World Athletics
- Affiliation date: 1924; 102 years ago
- Regional affiliation: NACAC
- Headquarters: La Habana
- President: Alberto Juantorena
- Vice president: Aurelio Romero
- Secretary: Jesús Molina
- Replaced: Unión Atlética Amateur de Cuba
- (Cuba)

The Cuban Athletics Federation (Spanish: Federación Cubana de Atletismo, FCA) is the governing body for the sport of athletics in Cuba. Current president is Alberto Juantorena. He was re-elected in December 2010.

== History ==
FCA was founded in 1922 as Unión Atlética Amateur de Cuba (UAAC) and was affiliated to the IAAF in 1924. UAAC dissolved in 1961, and was replaced by the Federación Cubana de Atletismo.

== Affiliations ==
FCA is the national member federation for Cuba in the following international organisations:

- World Athletics
- North American, Central American and Caribbean Athletic Association (NACAC)
- Association of Panamerican Athletics (APA)
- Asociación Iberoamericana de Atletismo (AIA; Ibero-American Athletics Association)
- Central American and Caribbean Athletic Confederation (CACAC)

Moreover, it is part of the following national organisations:

- Cuban Olympic Committee (COC; Comité Olímpico Cubano)

== National records ==
FCA maintains the Cuban records in athletics.
