= Bolivia at the 2009 World Championships in Athletics =

- WA code: BOL

in Berlin
- Competitors: 2 (1 man, 1 woman)
- Medals: Gold 0 Silver 0 Bronze 0 Total 0

World Championships in Athletics appearances
- 1983; 1987; 1991; 1993; 1995; 1997; 1999; 2001; 2003; 2005; 2007; 2009; 2011; 2013; 2015; 2017; 2019; 2022; 2023; 2025

Bolivia competed at the 2009 World Championships in Athletics in Berlin, Germany, which were held from 15 to 23 August 2009. The athlete delegation consisted of two competitors, middle-distance runner Evans Pinto and racewalker Geovana Irusta. Pinto competed in the qualifying heats of the men's 800 metres and placed seventh in his heat, failing to advance further into the semifinals. Irusta competed in the women's 20 kilometres walk and placed 30th out of the 37 racewalkers that completed the race.

== Background ==
The 2009 World Championships in Athletics were held at the Olympiastadion in Berlin, Germany. Under the auspices of the International Amateur Athletic Federation, this was the twelfth edition of the World Championships. It was held from 15 to 23 August 2009 and had 47 different events. Among the competing teams was Bolivia. For this edition of the World Championships in Athletics, middle-distance runner Evans Pinto and racewalker Geovana Irusta competed for the team. This was Irusta's seventh consecutive and last appearance for the nation at a World Championships.

== Results ==
=== Men ===
Pinto competed in the qualifying heats of the men's 800 metres on 20 August 2009 in the fifth heat against seven other competitors. There, he recorded a time of 1:52.23 and placed seventh, failing to advance further as only the top three of each heat and the next three fastest athletes would only be able to do so.

Event	Athletes	Heats		Semifinal		Final	
Event	Athletes	Result	Rank	Result	Rank	Result	Rank
800 m	Evans Pinto	1:52.23	44	did not advance			

=== Women ===
Irusta competed in the finals of the women's 20 kilometres walk on 16 August 2009 against 48 other racewalkers. There, she recorded a time of 1:39:16 and placed 30th out of the 37 racewalkers that completed the race.

Event	Athletes	Final	
Event	Athletes	Result	Rank
20km walk	Geovana Irusta	1:39:16	30
