= Ecuadorian Athletics Federation =

Sports governing body in Ecuador

- Federación Ecuatoriana de Atletismo
- Sport: Athletics
- Jurisdiction: Federation
- Abbreviation: FEA
- Affiliation: World Athletics
- Regional affiliation: CONSUDATLE
- Affiliation date: 1925
- Headquarters: Cuenca, Azuay
- President: Manuel Bravo
- Vice president: Sandra Amparito Barragán
- Secretary: Danilo Almeida

Official website
- www.featle.org.ec
- (Ecuador)

The Ecuadorian Athletics Federation (Spanish: Federación Ecuatoriana de Atletismo, FEA) is the governing body for athletics in Ecuador. The current president is Manuel Bravo.

== History ==
FEA joined CONSUDATLE in 1925.

Until 2012, FEA's president was Fausto Mendoza. In October 2012, former long distance runner Franklin Tenorio was elected as new president. However, after only one year, former football player Luis ‘El Chino’ Gómez was elected to replace Tenorio. After only one week, he already resigned and his vice-president, former middle distance runner and 1990 South American Games 800m silver medallist Manuel Bravo from Cuenca took office as new FEA president.

FEA comprises the associations and provincial committees of Ecuador.

FEA maintains Ecuadorian records in athletics.

== Affiliations ==
FEA is the national member federation for Ecuador in the following international organisations:

- World Athletics
- Confederación Sudamericana de Atletismo (CONSUDATLE; South American Athletics Confederation)
- Association of Panamerican Athletics (APA)
- Asociación Iberoamericana de Atletismo (AIA; Ibero-American Athletics Association)
- Ecuadorian National Olympic Committee (Spanish: Comité Olímpico Ecuatoriano)
