= South American Athletics =

Governing body of athletics for South America

- Formation: 1918
- Type: Sports federation
- Headquarters: Manaus, Amazonas, Brazil
- Members: 13 member federations
- President: (Brazil) Roberto Gesta de Melo
- Website: AtletismoSudamericano.org (in Spanish)

Former logo

South American Athletics (Spanish: Atletismo Sudamericano), formerly CONSUDATLE (Spanish: Confederación Sudamericana de Atletismo; South American Athletics Confederation), is the continental confederation governing body of athletics for national governing bodies and multi-national federations within South America, including the transcontinental country Panama. CONSUDATLE is one of six area associations of World Athletics (WA). South American Athletics was founded on 24 May 1918, in Buenos Aires, Argentina. Therefore, the governing body claims to be the oldest athletics area association of the world. The founding members were Argentina, Uruguay, and Andean Chile. Successively, the other countries joined: Brazil in 1922, Ecuador and Peru in 1925, Bolivia in 1930, and Colombia in 1937. Paraguay and Venezuela followed later, and Guyana, Panama, and Suriname joined within the last decades.

== Presidents ==
The current president Roberto Gesta de Melo was re-elected in 2010 for the period 2011–2015 in Rio de Janeiro. Former presidents can be found here.

Name	Country	Presidency
Carlos Fanta	Chile	1918–1919
Francisco Ghigliani	Uruguay	1919–1920
Alfredo W. Betteley	Chile	1920–1921
Francisco Ghigliani	Uruguay	1921–1926
Alfredo W. Betteley	Chile	1927–1928
Alfredo Benavides Canseco	Peru	1929–1930
Próspero Alemandri	Argentina	1930–1931
Juan Astengo	Uruguay	1931–1933
Luis Mandujano Tobar	Chile	1934–1935
Luis Aranha	Brazil	1936–1937
Luis Gálvez Chipoco	Peru	1937–1960
Pedro J. Gálvez Velarde	Peru	1960–1989
Jacobo Bucaram	Ecuador	1989–1993
Roberto Gesta de Melo	Brazil	1993–present

== Championships ==
The ConSudAtle organizes the following championships, tournaments, and circuits:

- South American Senior Championships in Athletics (Campeonatos Sudamericanos de Atletismo de Adultos)
- South American Under-23 Championships (Campeonatos Sudamericanos de Atletismo de Sub-23)
- South American Junior (Under-20) Championships (Campeonatos Sudamericanos de Atletismo de Juveniles)
- South American Youth (Under-18) Championships (Campeonatos Sudamericanos de Atletismo de Menores)
- South American Age Group (Under-16) Championships (Campeonatos Sudamericanos de Atletismo Infantil)
- South American Cross Country Championships (Campeonatos Sudamericanos de Atletismo de Cross Country)
- South American Race Walking Championships (Campeonatos Sudamericanos de Atletismo de Marcha Atlética)
- South American Marathon Championships (Campeonatos Sudamericanos de Atletismo de Maratón)
- South American Half Marathon Championships (Campeonatos Sudamericanos de Atletismo de Media Maratón)
- South American Half Marathon Circuit (Circuito Sudamericano de Media Maratón)
- South American Road Mile Championships (Campeonatos Sudamericanos de Milla en Ruta)
- South American Mountain Running Championships (Campeonatos Sudamericanos de Carreras de Montaña)

== Member federations ==
Country	Federation	Link
Argentina	Argentine Athletics Confederation	www.cada-atletismo.com
Bolivia	Bolivian Athletics Federation	www.atlebolivia.net
Brazil	Brazilian Athletics Confederation	www.cbat.org.br
Chile	Chilean Athletics Federation	www.fedachi.cl
Colombia	Colombian Athletics Federation	www.fecodatle.org
Ecuador	Ecuadorian Athletics Federation	www.coe.org.ec
Guyana	Athletics Association of Guyana	athleticsguyana.org
Panama	Panamanian Athletics Federation	www.panama-sport.com
Paraguay	Paraguayan Athletics Federation	www.fpa.com.py
Peru	Peruvian Athletics Sport Federation	www.fedepeatle.org
Suriname	Suriname Athletics Federation	www.surinaamseatletiekbond.com
Uruguay	Uruguayan Athletics Confederation	www.atlecau.org.uy
Venezuela	Venezuelan Athletics Federation	www.feveatletismo.org.ve

== See also ==
- Association of Panamerican Athletics (APA)
- Central American and Caribbean Athletic Confederation (CACAC)
- Central American Isthmus Athletic Confederation (CADICA)
- North American, Central American and Caribbean Athletic Association (NACAC)
