= Puerto Rican Athletics Federation =

Governing body for athletics in Puerto Rico

- Federación de Atletismo de Puerto Rico
- Sport: Athletics
- Jurisdiction: Federation
- Abbreviation: FAPUR
- Founded: 1947
- Affiliation: IAAF
- Affiliation date: 1948
- Regional affiliation: NACAC
- Headquarters: Bayamón
- President: José Enrique Arrarás
- Vice president: Luis Dieppa
- Secretary: Carlos Alfonso Guzmán
- Replaced: Federación de Atletismo Aficionado de Puerto Rico

Official website
- www.atletismofapur.com
- (Puerto Rico)

The Puerto Rican Athletics Federation (Spanish: Federación de Atletismo de Puerto Rico FAPUR) is the governing body for the sport of athletics in Puerto Rico. Current president is José Enrique Arrarás. He was re-elected in October 2012.

== History ==
FAPUR was founded in 1947 as Federación de Atletismo Aficionado de Puerto Rico and was affiliated to the IAAF in 1948.

== Presidents ==
Starting with the foundation of FAPUR in 1947, there were nine presidents and an intermediate board.

Name	Presidency
Julio Enrique Monagas	1947-1965
Amadeo Francis	1965-1973
Eugenio Rojas Náter	1973-1976
Ismael Delgado Dávila	1976-1979
Intermediate Board (Junta Pro-tempore); Rosarito López Cepero; Manuel Ramírez; Sammis Reyes; Roberto Muñoz Zayas	1979-1982
Roberto Muñoz Zayas	1982-1986
Iván Mangual	1987-1991
Luis Rivera Toledo	1991-1995
Roberto Velázquez Rosaly	1995-1999
José Enrique Arrarás	2000-2016

== Affiliations ==
FAPUR is the national member federation for Puerto Rico in the following international organisations:

- International Association of Athletics Federations (IAAF)
- North American, Central American and Caribbean Athletic Association (NACAC)
- Association of Panamerican Athletics (APA)
- Asociación Iberoamericana de Atletismo (AIA; Ibero-American Athletics Association)
- Central American and Caribbean Athletic Confederation (CACAC)

Moreover, it is part of the following national organisations:

- Puerto Rico Olympic Committee (COPUR; Comité Olímpico de Puerto Rico)

== National records ==
FAPUR maintains the Puerto Rican records in track and field.

== See also ==
- Ponce Marathon
