= Curaçao Athletics Association =

Sports governing body in Curaçao

- Sport: Athletics
- Jurisdiction: Association
- Abbreviation: CAB
- Founded: September 16, 1966
- Headquarters: Willemstad
- President: Willem Cordilia
- Board members: Stacy René Rachmil van Lamoen Janelycze Mercelita Atilio Louisa
- Secretary: ZizanyHenriquez
- Replaced: Nederlands Antilliaanse Atletiek Unie

Official website
- curacaoatletiekbond.com
- (Curaçao)

The Curaçao Athletics Association (CAB; Curaçaose Atletiek Bond) is the governing body for the sport of athletics in Curaçao. The Current president is Willem Cordilia.

Curacaose Atletiek Bond, Curaçao Athletic Federation, is the national Track & Field Federation in Curaçao, which was founded in 1966.

It has a total of 11 affiliated Track & Field member Clubs, with approximately 275 active member athletes.

The main goal of this federation is to promote the track & field sport, by:

- Organizing competitions and championships;
- Supporting all, when practicing the sport;
- Representing the interest of all members;
- Creating awareness;
- Creating collaborations with local and international organizations.

== History ==
CAB was founded on September 16, 1966.

== Affiliations ==
CAB is an observer member federation for Curaçao in the

- Central American and Caribbean Athletic Confederation (CACAC)

CAB is invited to participate at the

- CARIFTA Games

Moreover, it is part of the following national organisations:

- Curaçao Sport & Olympic Federation (CSOF)

However, the CSOF is not recognized by the IOC. After modifying its Charter in 1996, only Olympic Committees representing independent states are admitted as new IOC members. Athletes from Curaçao had to participate at the 2012 Summer Olympics as Independent Olympic Athletes under the Olympic flag.

== National records ==
CAB maintains the Curaçaoan records in athletics.
