= Pista de Atletismo Darwin Piñeyrúa =

Running track in Montevideo, Uruguay

Pista de Atletismo Darwin Piñeirúa
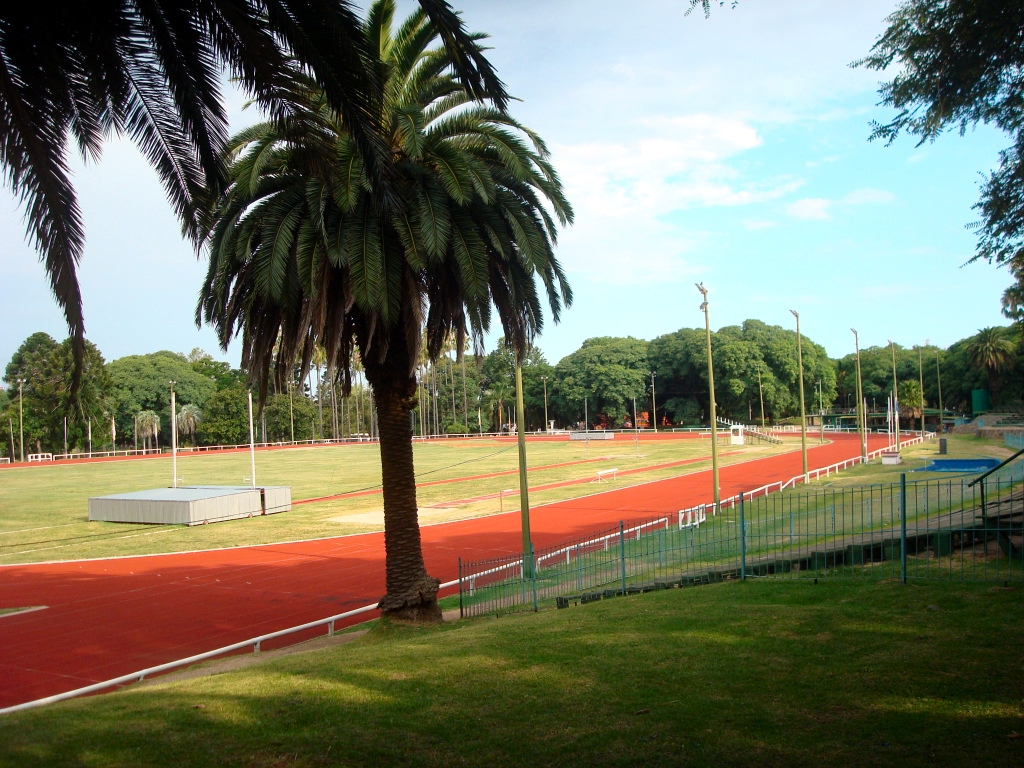
- Pista de Atletismo Darwin Piñeirúa
- Interactive map of Pista de Atletismo Darwin Piñeirúa
- Location: Montevideo, Uruguay
- Coordinates: 34.8956°S 56.1574°W
- Surface: grass

Pista de Atletismo Darwin Piñeyrúa is a running track in Montevideo, Uruguay. It is a major venue for events organized by the Uruguayan Athletics Confederation. It is situated in the Parque Batlle near Estadio Centenario. It is named after Uruguayan athlete Darwin Piñeyrúa.

== International competitions ==
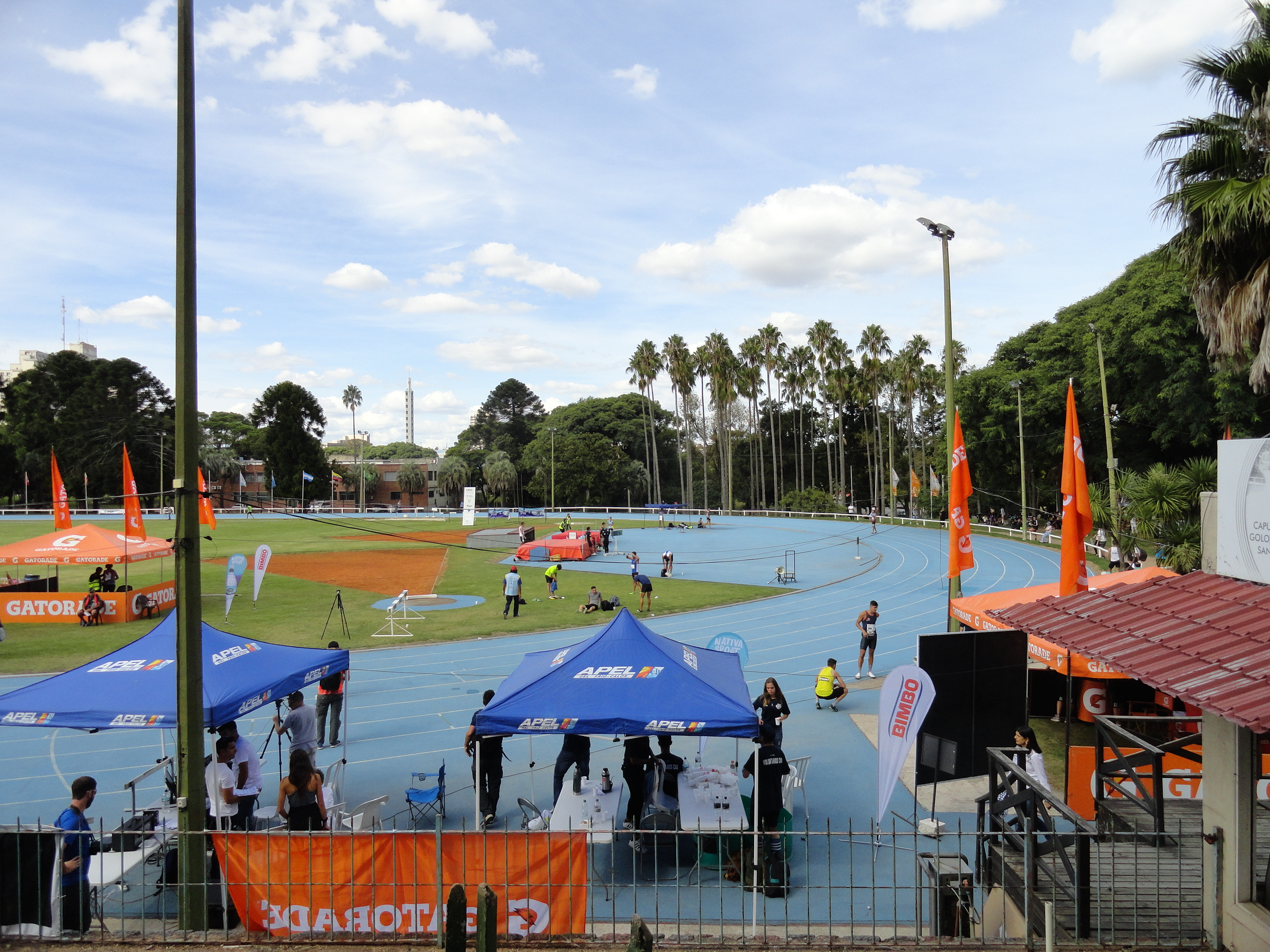
Pista de Atletismo during the 2019 Grand Prix

The main international annual event in Uruguay is the Grand Prix Darwin Piñeyrúa and Estrella Puente, which is held at the Pista de Atletismo. Other international events that were held at the venue include:

- The 2014 South American Under-23 Championships in Athletics
