= List of Curaçaoan records in athletics =

The following are the national records in athletics in Curaçao maintained by its national athletics federation: Curaçaose Atletiek Bond (CAB).

== Outdoor ==
=== Men ===
Event	Record	Athlete	Date	Meet	Place	Ref.
100 m	10.63	Hensley Paulina	16 March 2012	AYC Dutch Caribbean Invitational	Oranjestad, Aruba	
200 m	20.82	Liemarvin Bonevacia	29 April 2012	Grand Prix International Ximena	Medellín, Colombia	
300 m	32.98	Liemarvin Bonevacia	5 July 2012	Meeting de la Province de Liège	Liège, Belgium	
400 m	45.60	Liemarvin Bonevacia	4 August 2012	Olympic Games	London, United Kingdom	
800 m	1:55.50	Jairo Troeman	11 March 2011	Carifta Trials 2011	Curacao	
1500 m	4:13.06	Jairo Troeman	13 May 2011	World Athletics Day	Curacao	
3000 m	10:31.59	Agiomar Nar	11 March 2011	Carifta Trials 2011	Curacao	
5000 m	17:56.34	Virgilio Isenia	9 April 2011	Pre-Carifta Games Competition 2011	Curacao	
10,000 m	39:16.00	Virgilio Isenia	30 April 2010	Aruba Boulevard Loop	Aruba	
Marathon						
110 m hurdles						
400 m hurdles						
3000 m steeplechase						
High jump	2.00 m	Quentin Siberi	23 April 2011	CARIFTA Games	Montego Bay, Jamaica	
Pole vault	4.65 m	Glenn Kunst	16 April 2017	CARIFTA Games	Willemstad, Curaçao	
Long jump	6.87 m	Quentin Siberi	11 June 2011	Pre-Curacao Championships 2011	Curacao	
Triple jump	14.30 m	Rigsheillo Rosalia	24 June 2011	Curacao Championships 2011	Curacao	
Shot put	10.79 m	John-Henk Maduro	11 March 2011	Carifta Trials 2011	Curacao	
Discus throw	34.96 m	Gionne Martes	8 April 2011	Pre-Carifta Games Competition 2011	Curacao	
Hammer throw						
Javelin throw						
Decathlon						
Decathlon	100m / Long jump / Shot put / High jump / 400m / 110m H / Discus / Pole vault / Javelin / 1500m					
20 km walk (road)						
50 km walk (road)						
4 × 100 m relay	41.49	(Curaçao); Nygell Dumfries; Liemarvin Bonevacia; Hensley Paulina; Rachmil Van Lamoen	16 July 2011	Central American and Caribbean Championships	Mayagüez, Puerto Rico	
4 × 400 m relay						

=== Women ===
Event	Record	Athlete	Date	Meet	Place	Ref.
100 m						
200 m	24.04 (+0.9 m/s)	Emmy Franenk	3 May 2012	MEAC Championships	Greensboro, United States	
400 m	53.84	Emmy Franenk	4 May 2012	MEAC Championships	Greensboro, United States	
800 m						
1500 m						
3000 m						
5000 m						
10,000 m						
Marathon						
100 m hurdles						
400 m hurdles						
3000 m steeplechase						
High jump	1.70 m	Sharyaane Gijsbertha	1 April 2013	CARIFTA Games	Nassau, Bahamas	
Pole vault						
Long jump						
Triple jump						
Shot put						
Discus throw						
Hammer throw						
Javelin throw						
Heptathlon						
Heptathlon	100m H / High jump / Shot put / 200m / Long jump / Javelin / 800m					
20 km walk (road)						
4 × 100 m relay						
4 × 400 m relay						

== Indoor ==
=== Men ===
Event	Record	Athlete	Date	Meet	Place	Ref.
60 m						
200 m						
400 m						
800 m						
1500 m						
3000 m						
60 m hurdles						
High jump						
Pole vault						
Long jump						
Triple jump						
Shot put						
Heptathlon						
Heptathlon	60m / Long jump / Shot put / High jump / 60m H / Pole vault / 1000m					
5000 m walk						
4 × 400 m relay						

=== Women ===
Event	Record	Athlete	Date	Meet	Place	Ref.
60 m	7.82	Emmy Franenk	28 January 2012	Penn State National Invitational	University Park, United States	
200 m						
400 m						
800 m						
1500 m						
3000 m						
60 m hurdles						
High jump						
Pole vault						
Long jump						
Triple jump						
Shot put						
Pentathlon						
Pentathlon	60m H / High jump / Shot put / Long jump / 800m					
3000 m walk						
4 × 400 m relay						
