= El Salvador at the 2013 World Championships in Athletics =

- WA code: ESA

in Moscow
- Competitors: 1
- Medals: Gold 0 Silver 0 Bronze 0 Total 0

World Championships in Athletics appearances
- 1983; 1987; 1991; 1993; 1995; 1997; 1999; 2001; 2003; 2005; 2007; 2009; 2011; 2013; 2015; 2017; 2019; 2022; 2023; 2025

El Salvador competed at the 2013 World Championships in Athletics in Moscow, Russia, from 10–18 August 2013. A team of one athlete was announced to represent the country in the event.

== Competitors ==
El Salvador was represented by 1 athlete:

=== Men ===
Athlete	Event	Time	Rank
Emerson Hernández	50 km walk	DQ	—
