= Grenada Athletic Association =

Governing body for athletics in Grenada

- Sport: Athletics
- Jurisdiction: Association
- Abbreviation: GAA
- Founded: 1924
- Affiliation: IAAF
- Affiliation date: 1970
- Regional affiliation: NACAC
- Headquarters: St. George’s
- President: Charles George
- Vice president: Aaron Moses
- Secretary: Jeanelle Gill
- Replaced: Grenada Amateur Athletic Association
- (Grenada)

The Grenada Athletic Association (GAA) is the governing body for the sport of athletics in Grenada.

== History ==
GAA was founded as Grenada Amateur Athletic Association in 1924, and was affiliated to the IAAF in 1970.

Current president is Charles George. He was re-elected in 2014 for another four-year term.

== Affiliations ==
GAA is the national member federation for Grenada in the following international organisations:

- International Association of Athletics Federations (IAAF)
- North American, Central American and Caribbean Athletic Association (NACAC)
- Association of Panamerican Athletics (APA)
- Central American and Caribbean Athletic Confederation (CACAC)

Moreover, it is part of the following national organisations:

- Grenada Olympic Committee (GOC)

== National records ==
GAA maintains the Grenadian records in athletics.
