= Ligue Régionale d'Athlétisme de la Guadeloupe =

Ligue Guadeloupéenne d'Athlétisme
- Sport: Athletics
- Abbreviation: LGA
- Founded: November 6, 1960
- Affiliation: Fédération française d'athlétisme
- Location: Pointe-à-Pitre
- President: CAIRO Élodie
- Vice president(s): ...
- Secretary: ...

Official website
- liguegua.athle.com
- /

The Ligue Guadeloupéenne d'Athlétisme (LGA) is the governing body for the sport of athletics in Guadeloupe. Current president is CAIRO Élodie.

As LRAG is part of the Fédération française d'athlétisme, athletes from Guadeloupe normally participate internationally for France, e.g., in European Athletics Championships as organized by the EAA. On the other hand, Guadeloupe as a French overseas department is part of the Caribbean. As an observer member of CACAC, Guadeloupe is invited to participate at the championships, and also at the CARIFTA Games.

== History ==
LRAG was founded on November 6, 1960.

== Presidents ==
Starting with the foundation of LRAG in 1960, there were about eight presidents.

Name	Presidency
Pierre Antonius	1961-1970
Roger Raymondi	1970-1976
Henri Corenthin	1976-1979
Michel Vinetot	1979-1996
Richard Diallo	1996-1997
Philippe Martol	1997-2001
Camille Elisabeth	2001-2012
Marie-José Pérec	2012-

== Affiliations ==
- Fédération française d'athlétisme (FAA)

LRAG is an observer member federation for Guadeloupe in the

- Central American and Caribbean Athletic Confederation (CACAC)

LRAG is invited to participate at the

- CARIFTA Games

== Regional records ==
LRAG maintains the Guadeloupe records in athletics.
