= CADICA =

Central American Isthmus Athletic Confederation (CADICA)
- Formation: 1964
- Type: Sports federation
- Members: 7 member federations
- Secretary General: (Costa Rica) Andrhea Briceño
- President: (Honduras) Ing. Calixto Sierra
- Website: AtletismoCADICA.org (in Spanish)

CADICA (Spanish: Confederación Atlética del Istmo Centroamericano; Central American Isthmus Athletic Confederation) is the regional confederation governing body of athletics for national governing bodies and multi-national federations within Central America.

The organization was founded in 1964, shortly before the second Central American Championships in Athletics were held. The current president is Ing. Calixto Sierra from Honduras.

== Championships ==
CADICA organizes the following championships:

- Central American Senior Championships in Athletics (Campeonatos Centroamericanos Mayores)
- Central American Junior (Under-20) and Youth (Under-18) Championships (Campeonatos Centroamericanos Juvenil A y B)
- Central American Age Group (Under-16 and Under-14) Championships (Campeonatos Centroamericanos Juvenil C y Infantil A)
- Central American Cross Country Championships (Campeonatos Centroamericanos de Campo Traviesa)
- Central American Race Walking Championships (Campeonatos Centroamericanos de Marcha), formerly: Central American Race Walking Cup (Copa Centroamericana de Marcha)

== Member federations ==
CADICA consists of 7 member federations. 6 of them are members of NACAC, while Panamá is member of CONSUDATLE. Moreover, all 7 are also members of CACAC.

Country	Federation	Website
Belize	Belize Amateur Athletic Association	
Costa Rica	Federación Costarricense de Atletismo	http://www.fecoa.org
El Salvador	Federación Salvadoreña de Atletismo	http://atletismoelsalvador.org/
Guatemala	Federación Nacional de Atletismo de Guatemala	http://www.atletismoguate.com
Honduras	Federación Nacional Hondureña de Atletismo	http://condepah.org/dr
Nicaragua	Federación Nicaragüense de Atletismo	
Panama	Federación Panameña de Atletismo	

== See also ==
- Association of Panamerican Athletics (APA)
- North American, Central American and Caribbean Athletic Association (NACAC)
- South American Athletics Confederation (CONSUDATLE)
- Central American and Caribbean Athletic Confederation (CACAC)
