= Asociación Iberoamericana de Atletismo =

International athletics sports governing body

- Sport: Athletics
- Jurisdiction: Association
- Abbreviation: AIA
- Founded: September 14, 1982
- Regional affiliation: Ibero-America
- President: Oscar Fernández Cáceres
- Secretary: Luis Condeso Ocampo

Official website
- www.aiatletismo.org

Ibero-America

The Asociación Iberoamericana de Atletismo (AIA; Iberoamerican Athletics Association) is the governing body for the sport of athletics of European, Latinamerican, and African countries with iberian origin and/or Spanish or Portuguese language. Current president is Oscar Fernández Cáceres from Peru.

== History ==
AIA was founded on September 14, 1982, in Madrid, Spain. First president was Juan Manuel de Hoz from Spain. Founder members were Portugal, Spain, and 20 Latin-American countries. In 1996, AIA was extended by six African countries. In 2005, Andorra joined, and last, Aruba was admitted to send athletes for the 2012 Ibero-American Championships.

== Championships ==
AIA organizes the following championships:

- Ibero-American Championships in Athletics (Spanish: Campeonato Iberoamericano de Atletismo)
- Ibero-American Marathon/Half Marathon Championships (Spanish: Campeonato Iberoamericano de Maratón/Media Maratón)
- Ibero-American U20 Championships in Athletics (Spanish: Campeonato Iberoamericano de Atletismo U20)
- Ibero-American U18 Championships in Athletics (Spanish: Campeonato Iberoamericano de Atletismo U18)

== Member federations ==
There are 30 member federations.

Nation	Organisation	Link
Europe (3)
Andorra	Federació Andorrana d'Atletisme	http://www.faa.ad
Portugal	Federação Portuguesa de Atletismo	http://fpatletismo.sapo.pt
Spain	Real Federación Española de Atletismo	http://www.rfea.es
Africa (6)
Angola	Federação Angolana de Atletismo	http://www.atletismoangola.com
Cape Verde	Federação Caboverdiana de Atletismo	http://www.fedatletismocaboverde.arturdomingos.org
Equatorial Guinea	Federación Ecuatoguineana de Atletismo	
Guinea-Bissau	Federação de Atletismo da Guiné-Bissau	https://www.facebook.com/FAGuineBissau
São Tomé and Príncipe	Federação Santomense de Atletismo	
Mozambique	Federação Moçambicana de Atletismo	https://web.archive.org/web/20130722080652/http://fmatletismo.co.mz/
Americas (21)
North America (1)
Mexico	Federación Mexicana de Asociaciones de Atletismo	http://www.fmaa.mx
Central America (6)
Costa Rica	Federación Costarricense de Atletismo	http://www.fecoa.org
El Salvador	Federación Salvadoreña de Atletismo	
Guatemala	Federación Nacional de Atletismo de Guatemala	http://www.atletismoguate.com
Honduras	Federación Nacional Hondureña de Atletismo	
Nicaragua	Federación Nicaragüense de Atletismo	https://web.archive.org/web/20120513105035/http://www.fna.org.ni/
Panama	Federación Panameña de Atletismo	
Caribbean Sea (4)
Aruba	Arubaanse Atletiek Bond	https://web.archive.org/web/20110725014846/http://www.arubaathleticfederation.org/
Cuba	Federación Cubana de Atletismo	
Dominican Republic	Federación Dominicana de Asociaciones de Atletismo	https://web.archive.org/web/20190702044949/http://www.fedomatle.org/
Puerto Rico	Federación de Atletismo de Puerto Rico	http://www.atletismofapur.com
South America (10)
Argentina	Confederación Argentina de Atletismo	http://www.cada-atletismo.org
Bolivia	Federación Atlética de Bolivia	https://web.archive.org/web/20191004002933/http://federacionatleticadebolivia.com/
Brazil	Confederação Brasileira de Atletismo	http://www.cbat.org.br
Chile	Federación Atlética de Chile	http://www.fedachi.cl
Colombia	Federación Colombiana de Atletismo	http://www.fecodatle.org
Ecuador	Federación Ecuatoriana de Atletismo	http://www.coe.org.ec
Paraguay	Federación Paraguaya de Atletismo	https://web.archive.org/web/20090221100826/http://www.fpa.com.py/
Peru	Federación Deportiva Peruana de Atletismo	https://web.archive.org/web/20180806151931/http://fepeatle.com/
Uruguay	Confederación Atlética del Uruguay	https://web.archive.org/web/20090402050918/http://www.atlecau.org.uy/
Venezuela	Federación Venezolana de Atletismo	https://web.archive.org/web/20080517165012/http://www.feveatletismo.org.ve/
