= Jamaica Athletics Administrative Association =

Governing body for athletics in Jamaica

Jamaica Athletics Administrative Association Limited
- Sport: Athletics
- Jurisdiction: Federation
- Abbreviation: JAAA
- Founded: 1932
- Affiliation: World Athletics
- Affiliation date: 1948
- Regional affiliation: NACAC
- Headquarters: Kingston
- Location: 6 Tremaine Road, Kingston 6, Jamaica
- President: Garth Gayle
- Vice president(s): Ian Forbes, Lincoln Eatmon, Michael Frater, Vilma Charlton
- Secretary: Marie Tavares
- Sponsor: PUMA
- Replaced: Jamaica Amateur Athletic Association

Official website
- athleticsja.org
- (Jamaica)

The Jamaica Athletics Administrative Association (JAAA) is the national governing body for the sport of athletics (including track and field, long-distance running and racewalking) in Jamaica. The association is based in Kingston. As of December 2020, the president of the association is Garth Gayle, JP. He succeeded Dr. Warren Blake who was elected interim president in November 2011 after the sudden death of Blake's predecessor Howard Aris, and re-elected in November 2012.

The objects of the association are to promote, develop and regulate amateur athletics in Jamaica. The JAAA aims to provide instruction and teaching of athletics to teachers, coaches, instructors and athletes. It organises competitions and events in Jamaica whilst laying down rules and regulations and providing rewards to winners.

Athletics, particularly sprinting, is a national sport in Jamaica, and the Jamaica Athletics Administrative Association plays a role in shaping development of the sport in the country.

== Executive ==
Following the election in December 2020, the members of the executive are: Garth Gayle, JP (president), Ian Forbes (1st vice president), Lincoln Eatmon (2nd vice president), Michael Frater (3rd vice president), Vilma Charlton (4th vice president), Marie Tavares (Honorary Secretary), Brian Smith (Assistant Secretary), Ludlow Watts (Honorary Treasurer), Leroy Cooke (Director of the Bureau of Records), along with management committee members; Heleen Francis, Dr Carl Bruce, Fedrick Dacres, Judith Ewart, Keith Wellington, Gregory Hamilton, Ewan Scott and Julette Parkes-Livermore.

== History ==
The history of athletics in Jamaica dates back at least to the year 1910, the starting date of the Interscholastic Championships (CHAMPS). JAAA was reconstituted as Jamaica Amateur Athletic Association in 1932 and was affiliated to the IAAF in 1948. In February 2011, the name was changed to Jamaica Athletic Administrative Association, thereby retaining the acronym JAAA.

== Affiliations ==
JAAA is the national member federation for Jamaica in the following international organisations:

- World Athletics
- North American, Central American and Caribbean Athletic Association (NACAC)
- Association of Panamerican Athletics (APA)
- Central American and Caribbean Athletic Confederation (CACAC)

Moreover, it is part of the following national organisation:

- Jamaica Olympic Association (JOA)

== National records ==
JAAA maintains the Jamaican records in athletics.
