= Costa Rican Athletics Federation =

Governing body for the sport of athletics in Costa Rica

- Federación Costarricense de Atletismo
- Sport: Athletics
- Jurisdiction: Federation
- Abbreviation: FECOA
- Founded: 1960
- Affiliation: IAAF
- Regional affiliation: NACAC
- Headquarters: San José
- President: Geen Clarke
- Vice president: Betsabé Barrantes
- Secretary: Marco Brenes

Official website
- www.fecoa.org
- (Costa Rica)

The Costa Rican Athletics Federation (Spanish: Federación Costarricense de Atletismo, FECOA) is the governing body for the sport of athletics in Costa Rica. Current president is Geen Clarke.

== History ==
Former logo

FECOA was founded in 1960.

== Affiliations ==
FECOA is the national member federation for Costa Rica in the following international organisations:

- International Association of Athletics Federations (IAAF)
- North American, Central American and Caribbean Athletic Association (NACAC)
- Association of Panamerican Athletics (APA)
- Asociación Iberoamericana de Atletismo (AIA; Ibero-American Athletics Association)
- Central American and Caribbean Athletic Confederation (CACAC)
- Confederación Atlética del Istmo Centroamericano (CADICA; Central American Isthmus Athletic Confederation)

Moreover, it is part of the following national organisations:

- Costa Rican National Olympic Committee (CONCRC; Comité Olímpico Nacional de Costa Rica)

== National records ==
FECOA maintains the Costa Rican records in athletics.
