= Chilean Athletics Federation =

Governing body of athletics in Chile

- Federación Atlética de Chile]
- Sport: Athletics
- Jurisdiction: Federation
- Abbreviation: FEDACHI
- Founded: May 21, 1914
- Affiliation: World Athletics
- Regional affiliation: CONSUDATLE
- Affiliation date: May 24, 1918
- Headquarters: Santiago
- President: Juan Luis Carter
- Vice president: Bernardo Espinoza
- Secretary: Mónica Fredes

Official website
- www.fedachi.cl
- (Chile)

The Chilean Athletics Federation (Spanish: Federación Atlética de Chile], FEDACHI) is the governing body of athletics in Chile. It served the purpose of the Chilean Olympic Committee until one was established in 1934. The president for the period 2014-2017 was Juan Luis Carter.

== History ==
FEDACHI was founded on 21 May 1914. First president was Erasmo Arellano Durán. FEDACHI was one of three founder members of the CONSUDATLE on 24 May 1918, in Buenos Aires. Former president until 2013 was Álvaro González.

== Affiliations ==
FEDACHI is the national member federation for Chile in the following international organisations:

- World Athletics
- Confederación Sudamericana de Atletismo (CONSUDATLE; South American Athletics Confederation)
- Association of Panamerican Athletics (APA)
- Asociación Iberoamericana de Atletismo (AIA; Ibero-American Athletics Association)

Moreover, it is part of the following national organisations:

- Chilean Olympic Committee (Spanish: Comité Olímpico de Chile)

== Members ==
FEDACHI comprises the regional athletics associations of Chile.

== National records ==
FEDACHI maintains the Chilean records in athletics.
