= National Association of Athletics Administrations of Trinidad & Tobago =

- Sport: Athletics
- Jurisdiction: Association
- Abbreviation: NAAATT
- Founded: 1945
- Affiliation: World Athletics
- Affiliation date: 1962
- Regional affiliation: NACAC
- Headquarters: Port-of-Spain
- President: Ephraim Serrette
- Vice president: George Comissiong
- Secretary: Allan Baboolal
- Replaced: National Amateur Athletic Association of Trinidad and Tobago

Official website
- naaatt.org
- (Trinidad and Tobago)

The National Association of Athletics Administrations of Trinidad & Tobago (NAAATT) is the governing body for the sport of athletics in Trinidad and Tobago.

== History ==
NAAATT was founded in 1945 as Amateur Athletic Association (AAA) of Trinidad and Tobago, and was affiliated to the IAAF in 1962. However, AAA ceased to organize national championships. Therefore, starting in 1969, the National Athletes Union (NAU) started to hold national championships leading to a reformation of a National Amateur Athletic Association of Trinidad and Tobago (NAAATT) in 1971. First president was Jesse Noel. In 2009, NAAATT was finally renamed to National Association of Athletics Administrations of Trinidad and Tobago.

Current president is former sprinter and 1978 Commonwealth Games relay silver medallist Ephraim Serrette. He took office in 2006, and was re-elected in 2010 for the period 2010–2013. In spite of calls for resignation of the entire executive over drug issues forcing sprinters Semoy Hackett and Kelly-Ann Baptiste to withdraw from the 2013 IAAF World Championships, he was re-elected in November 2013.

== Affiliations ==
NAAATT is the national member federation for Trinidad and Tobago in the following international organisations:

- World Athletics
- North American, Central American and Caribbean Athletic Association (NACAC)
- Association of Panamerican Athletics (APA)
- Central American and Caribbean Athletic Confederation (CACAC)

Moreover, it is part of the following national organisations:

- Trinidad and Tobago Olympic Committee (TTOC)

== National records ==
NAAATT maintains the Trinidad and Tobago records in athletics.
