= El Salvador at the 2023 World Athletics Championships =

- Flag of El Salvador
- WA code: ESA

in Budapest, Hungary 19 August 2023 – 27 August 2023
- Competitors: 1 (1 man and 0 women)
- Medals: Gold 0 Silver 0 Bronze 0 Total 0

World Athletics Championships appearances
- 1983; 1987; 1991; 1993; 1995; 1997; 1999; 2001; 2003; 2005; 2007; 2009; 2011; 2013; 2015; 2017; 2019; 2022; 2023; 2025

El Salvador competed at the 2023 World Athletics Championships in Budapest, Hungary, which were held from 19 to 27 August 2023. The athlete delegation of the country was composed of one competitor, hurdler Pablo Andrés Ibáñez who would compete in the men's 400 metres hurdles. He qualified for the Championships after meeting the entry standard of his event. In the heats, Ibáñez placed sixth out of the nine competitors that competed in his heat and did not advance to the semifinals of the event.

== Background ==
The 2023 World Athletics Championships in Budapest, Hungary, were held from 19 to 27 August 2023. The Championships were held at the National Athletics Centre. To qualify for the World Championships, athletes had to reach an entry standard (e.g. time or distance), place in a specific position at select competitions, be a wild card entry, or qualify through their World Athletics Ranking at the end of the qualification period.

Hurdler Pablo Andrés Ibáñez would be the sole representative for the nation at the championships. He qualified after meeting the entry standard of 400 metres hurdles of 48.70 seconds, recording a national record time of 48.56 seconds at the 2023 Central American Championships in Athletics held in the Costa Rica National Stadium.

== Results ==
Key

- Q = Qualified for the next round
- q = Qualified for the next round as a fastest loser or, in field events, by position without achieving the qualifying target
- NR = National record
- PB = Personal best
- SB = Season best
- N/A = Round not applicable for the event

=== Men ===
Ibáñez competed in the heats of the men's 400 metres hurdles on 20 August against eight other competitors in his heat. He raced in the third heat and recorded a time of 50.01 seconds. There, he placed sixth and did not advance further to the semifinals.

Track and road events

Athlete	Event	Heat		Semifinal		Final	
Athlete	Event	Result	Rank	Result	Rank	Result	Rank
Pablo Andrés Ibáñez	400 metres hurdles	50.01	6	Did not advance			
