= Ephraim Serrette =

Trinidad and Tobago sprinter

Ephraim Serrette (born 6 October 1957 in Port of Spain) is a former sprinter from Trinidad and Tobago. He is the president of the country's athletics body, the National Association of Athletics Administrations of Trinidad & Tobago.

He made his international debut in the relay at the 1976 CARIFTA Games, but the team was disqualified for running out of the lane. His first international medal, a silver, came at the 1977 Central American and Caribbean Championships in Athletics in the relay. He rose to prominence that year by winning both the senior and junior national titles in the 100 metres – he defeated the leading athlete of the time, Hasely Crawford, with a run of 10.01 seconds.

He was a silver medallist in the 4×100 metres relay at the 1978 Commonwealth Games, running alongside Chris Brathwaite, Edwin Noel and Crawford. The same year he shared in the relay golds with Noel, Crawford and Anthony Husbands.

He attended Fairleigh Dickinson University and studied Management Accounting. While there he competed collegiately and was third in the 55 metres event at the 1978 NCAA Men's Indoor Track and Field Championships.
