= Central American Cross Country Championships =

- Sport: Cross country running
- Founded: 2007
- Continent: Central America (CADICA)

The Central American Cross Country Championships (Spanish: Campeonato Centroamericano de Campo Traviesa) are an annual Cross country running competition organized by CADICA for athletes representing the countries of its member associations. They were established in 2007. Races are featured for senior (Mayor), junior (U-20, Juvenil A), youth (U-18, Juvenil B), and two age groups (U-16, (Juvenil C) starting in 2008, and U-14, (Infantil A) starting in 2012) for both male and female athletes.

== Editions ==
	Year	City	Country	Date
I	2007	Lord's Bank, Belize	Belize	February 24
II	2008	Belize City	Belize	February 16
III	2009	Orange Walk Town	Belize	February 28
IV	2010	Managua	Nicaragua	February 20
V	2011	Tela, Atlántida	Honduras	February 5
VI	2012	San Ignacio, Chalatenango	El Salvador	February 11
VII	2013	Antigua, Sacatepéquez	Guatemala	December 15, 2012
VIII	2014	San Rafael de Montes de Oca, San José	Costa Rica	February 8
IX	2015	Tela, Atlántida	Honduras	February 7

== Results ==
Complete result list were published on the CADICA website. Results for the junior and youth competitions can be found on the World Junior Athletics History ("WJAH") webpage.

=== Men's results ===
==== Senior ====
Year	Gold		Silver		Bronze	
2007 (12km)	José Carlos Raxón (GUA)	38:45	Francisco Gómez Vega (CRC)	38:57	Gabriel Yos (GUA)	39:03
2008	Salvador Patzán (GUA)	35:38	Santiago Reyes Cucul (GUA)	35:45	José Carlos Raxón (GUA)	36:37
2009 (12km)	Jeremías Saloj (GUA)	41:07	Maurilio Palacios (GUA)	41:53	Erick Quirós (CRC)	42:28
2010 (12km)	Dimas Castro (NCA)	37:36.9	Álvaro Vásquez (NCA)	37:54.7	Sergio Vladimir Espinoza (NCA)	38:19.0
2011 (12km)	Jeremías Saloj (GUA)	41:54	Williams Sánchez (ESA)	42:27	Rodrigo Bautista (HON)	42:55
2012 (12km)	Santos Pirir (GUA)	44:11	Marvin Pasa (GUA)	44:28	Estuardo Palacios (GUA)	45:01
2013 (12km)	Marvin Pasa (GUA)	39:55	José Alfredo Asturias (GUA)	41:12	Álvaro Vásquez (NCA)	42:35
2014 (12km)	Marvin Pasa (GUA)	39:36	Dimas Castro (NCA)	39:46	Elvin Cu (GUA)	39:55
2015 (12km)	Williams Sánchez (ESA)	42:27	Álvaro Louis Sanabria (CRC)	42:53	Alejandro Calderón (CRC)	42:58

==== Junior U-20 (Juvenil A) ====
Year	Gold		Silver		Bronze	
2007 (8km)	Jeremías Saloj (GUA)	27:13	Dolman Barrios (GUA)	27:21	Estuardo Palacios (GUA)	27:38
2008 (8km)	Estuardo Palacios (GUA)	24:02	Juan Carlos Chay (GUA)	24:13	Luis Mendoza (GUA)	25:11
2009 (8km)	José Alfredo Raxón (GUA)	27:54	Luis Mendoza (GUA)	28:14	Mynor Ajú (GUA)	28:28
2010 (8km)	José Alfredo Raxón (GUA)	24:32	Carlos Rivera (CRC)	26:12	Joel Hernández (NCA)	27:18
2011 (8km)	Carlos Aguilar (ESA)	28:45	Steven Valverde (CRC)	29:44	Carlos Rivera (CRC)	30:00
2012 (8km)	Germán Rivas (CRC)	29:36	Edwin Pirir (GUA)	29:40	Walter Yac (GUA)	29:45
2013 (8km)	Edwin Pirir (GUA)	26:52	Walter Yac (GUA)	27:06	Mario Sucup (GUA)	28:09
2014 (8km)	Carlos Avila (GUA)	26:35	José Enrique Calvo (CRC)	27:16	David Alexander Escobar (ESA)	27:53
2015 (8km)	Andrés Mauricio Rivera (CRC)	29:40	Ronald de Jesús Monterrosa (ESA)	29:56	José Óscar Segura (ESA)	30:00

==== Youth U-18 (Juvenil B) ====
Year	Gold		Silver		Bronze	
2007 (6km)	José Alfredo Raxón (GUA)	22:14	Cristian Quintanilla (ESA)	22:43	Elmer Ramírez (ESA)	22:44
2008 (6km)	Mynor Ajú (GUA)	18:35	José Alfredo Raxón (GUA)	18:57	Roberto Valle (HON)	18:58
2009 (6km)	Carlos Aguilar (ESA)	21:10	Marvel Xol (GUA)	21:28	Freddy Ruano (GUA)	21:36
2010 (6km)	Freddy Ruano (GUA)	19:16	Steven Valverde (CRC)	20:06	Jimer Martínez (NCA)	20:06
2011 (6km)	Edwin Pirir (GUA)	21:49	Immer Leyton (NCA)	23:09	Rodrigo Rodríguez (NCA)	23:13
2012 (6km)	Mario Sucup (GUA)	22:48	David Alexander Escobar (ESA)	23:08	Edgar Concoha (GUA)	23:19
2013 (6km)	Edgar Concoha (GUA)	21:38	Allan González (GUA)	22:39	Crystian López (GUA)	22:57
2014 (6km)	Kenneth Mejía (CRC)	21:02	David Marin (CRC)	21:11	César Ajpacajá (GUA)	21:35
2015 (6km)	Erick Saúl Hernández (ESA)	21:51	José Vladimir Maravilla (ESA)	22:26	Kenneth Mejía (CRC)	22:26

==== U-16 (Juvenil C) ====
Year	Gold		Silver		Bronze	
2008 (4km)	Denroy Nembhard (BIZ)	16:27	Auriel Lewis (BIZ)	16:31		
2009 (4km)	Carlo González (GUA)	15:06	Nestor Mijangos (GUA)	15:17	Daniel Sánchez (BIZ)	18:32
2010 (4km)	Immer Leyton (NCA)	12:42	Rodrigo Rodríguez (NCA)	12:47	Carlos Albert González (GUA)	13:29
2011 (4km)	Luis Solórzano (ESA)	14:35	Melvin García (GUA)	14:39	Andrés Mauricio Rivera (CRC)	15:04
2012 (4km)	Amilcar García (GUA)	16:04	Jorge Vallecillo (NCA)	16:24	Samuel García (GUA)	16:32
2013 (4km)	Amilcar García (GUA)	14:33	David Marin (CRC)	15:02	Luis Araya (CRC)	16:01
2014 (4km)	Anthony González (GUA)	13:46	Henrry Gutierrez (GUA)	14:04	Damián García (CRC)	14:39
2015 (4km)	Sam Vanderjeugt (CRC)	14:30	Nelson Ismael Aldana (ESA)	14:57	Brayann Santiago Acuña (NCA)	15:16

==== U-14 (Infantil A) ====
Year	Gold		Silver		Bronze	
2012 (2km)	José Rene López (NCA)	8:18	Aaron Bolaños (ESA)	8:22	Joseph Alejandro Hernández (ESA)	8:44
2013 (2km)	Kevin Rodríguez (CRC)	7:57	Brandon Ramírez (CRC)	8:04		
2014 (2km)	Jean Paul Unfried (CRC)	7:18	Andrey Poveda (CRC)	7:35	David Porras (CRC)	7:38
2015 (2km)	Andy Felipe Cordoba (CRC)	7:27	Bryan Alexander Hernández (ESA)	7:46	José Mariano Maroto (CRC)	7:49

=== Women's Results ===
==== Senior ====
Year	Gold		Silver		Bronze	
2007 (8km)	Elsa Monterroso (GUA)	31:32	Rosemary Girón (GUA)	32:17	Evonne Marroquín (GUA)	33:34
2008	Evonne Marroquín (GUA)	29:11	Melissa Henderson (BIZ)	29:45	Imelda Bac (GUA)	30:48
2009 (8km)	Evonne Marroquín (GUA)	32:57	Imelda Bac (GUA)	33:36	Eva María Rodríguez (ESA)	35:12
2010 (8km)	Aldy Villalobos (NCA)	29:50	Ingrid Santos (GUA)	31:00	Rafaela Hernández (NCA)	33:00
2011 (8km)	Delbin Solís (ESA)	34:54	Gladys Landaverde (ESA)	35:19	Gladys Yamileth Argueta (HON)	39:26
2012 (8km)	Merlín Chalí (GUA)	34:36	Lesvia Marisol Bolaños (GUA)	35:01	Imelda Bac (GUA)	35:04
2013 (8km)	Evonne Marroquín (GUA)	32:29	Miriam Yax (GUA)	32:30	Lesbia Mariela Pérez (GUA)	32:36
2014 (8km)	Merlín Chalí (GUA)	31:45	Lesbia Mariela Pérez (GUA)	31:54	Mónica Vargas (CRC)	32:50
2015 (8km)	Xiomara Yaneth Barrera (ESA)	34:00	Ana Catalina Skipton (CRC)	34:05	Aldy Jimena González (HON)	34:28

==== Junior U-20 (Juvenil A) ====
Year	Gold		Silver		Bronze	
2007 (6km)	Cecilia Gutiérrez (GUA)	25:30	Elda Fernández (GUA)	28:01		
2008 (6km)	Reginalda Mijangos (GUA)	21:58	Ingrid Santos (GUA)	22:00	Carmen Cruz (HON)	29:15
2009 (6km)	Blanca Solís (ESA)	24:52	Ingrid Santos (GUA)	25:33	Gladys Landaverde (ESA)	26:21
2010 (6km)	Heidy Vásquez (GUA)	22:53	Cony Villalobos (NCA)	23:57	María Ángeles Escobar (NCA)	26:16
2011 (6km)	Carmen Puac (GUA)	28:32	Martha del Cid (HON)	31:35	Nolvia Cartagena (HON)	36:49
2012 (6km)	Kimberly Chali (GUA)	26:38	Blanca García (GUA)	27:50	Sharon González (GUA)	28:48
2013 (6km)	Sandra Martínez (GUA)	27:05	Cora Gutiérrez (GUA)	27:42	Meyling Hernández (NCA)	29:44
2014 (6km)	Laura Co (GUA)	25:13	Alba de Leon (GUA)	25:22	Priscilla Solís (CRC)	25:43
2015 (6km)	María Aldana González (CRC)	25:39	Joselyn Miranda (CRC)	28:32	Siugey Pamela Gutiérrez (CRC)	28:58

==== Youth U-18 (Juvenil B) ====
Year	Gold		Silver		Bronze	
2007 (4km)	Brenda Salmerón (ESA)	15:31	Reginalda Mijangos (GUA)	15:48	Josselin Escobar (ESA)	16:01
2008 (4km)	Rosi Tec (GUA)	14:13	Jenna Ferguzon (BIZ)	16:24		
2009 (4km)	Sharon González (GUA)	17:07	Seneida Martínez (NCA)	18:20		
2010 (4km)	Maritza Poncio (GUA)	15:11	Martha del Cid (HON)	15:41	María Torres (CRC)	16:43
2011 (4km)	Maritza Poncio (GUA)	17:08	Rosalina Álvarez (NCA)	20:07	Osiris Granados (NCA)	20:24
2012 (4km)	Natalia Vides (GUA)	17:58	Wendy Ascencio (ESA)	18:22	Cora Gutiérrez (GUA)	18:32
2013 (4km)	María Bac (GUA)	16:33	Laura Co (GUA)	16:56	María Aldana González (CRC)	17:02
2014 (4km)	Viviana Aroche (GUA)	16:10	María Bac (GUA)	16:20	María Aldana Gonzalez (CRC)	16:29
2015 (4km)	Irma Margarita Aldana (ESA)	16:34	Chrisdyala Moraga (CRC)	17:05	Ana Mirta Hércules (ESA)	17:25

==== U-16 (Juvenil C) ====
Year	Gold		Silver		Bronze	
2008 (2km)	Diana Gutiérrez (GUA)	6:45	Karina Santiago (GUA)	7:03	Martha del Cid (HON)	7:36
2009 (2km)	Karina Santiago (GUA)	7:37	Heidy Gonón (GUA)	7:45	Irene Barrondo (GUA)	7:56
2010 (2km)	Meyling Hernández (NCA)	6:38	Jacqueline Montoya (CRC)	6:49	Irene Barrondo (GUA)	6:49
2011 (2km)	María Aguilar (CRC)	7:47	Dina Mijangos (GUA)	8:07	Nayla Molina (GUA)	8:08
2012 (2km)	María Bac (GUA)	8:07	María Aguilar (CRC)	8:13	Jennifer Herrador (GUA)	8:23
2013 (2km)	Chrisdyala Moraga (CRC)	7:54	Hilda Álvarez (GUA)	8:02	Jessica Gaitan (GUA)	8:06
2014 (2km)	Keyli Cu (GUA)	7:37	Noelia Vargas (CRC)	8:00	Yensy Paniagua (CRC)	8:07
2015 (2km)	Melany Elias (ESA)	8:03	Aicela González (CRC)	8:18	Alexandra Barrios (CRC)	8:31

==== U-14 (Infantil A) ====
Year	Gold		Silver		Bronze	
2012 (2km)	Asling Vázquez (NCA)	8:38	Katya Almendarez (ESA)	8:49	Alexandra García (ESA)	9:33
2013 (2km)	Darlyn González (GUA)	8:05	Aicela González (CRC)	8:33	Kimberly González (GUA)	9:21
2014 (2km)	Heydi Cu (GUA)	7:21	Melani Elias (ESA)	7:54	Estefanía Díaz (NCA)	8:18
2015 (2km)	Estefanía Díaz (NCA)	8:05	Pita Marieluz Méndez (HON)	8:10	Karen Estefany Hernández (ESA)	8:15

=== Mixed Results ===
==== Mixed Relay Senior and U-20 ====
Year	Gold		Silver		Bronze	
2014 (4 x 1km)	Costa Rica; José Enrique Calvo; Candy Salazar; Georman Rivas; Mónica Vargas	12:32	Guatemala; Merlín Chalí; Marvin Pasa; Lesbia Mariela Pérez; Elvin Cu	12:42	Nicaragua; Álvaro Vásquez; María José Cortez; Dimas Castro; Yelka Mairena	13:07
2015 (4 x 1km)	Costa Rica B Jeison Alejandro Poveda; Julay Catalina Gamboa; Andrés Mauricio Rivera; María Aldana González	13:59	Costa Rica A Alejandro Calderón; Mónica Viviana Vargas; Álvaro Louis Sanabria; Ana Catalina Skipton	14:15	Honduras; Aldy Jimena González; Karen Giselle Ortez; Denis Nohel Bonilla; Santos Vicente Velásquez	14:18

==== Mixed Relay U-18, U-16, and U-14 ====
Year	Gold		Silver		Bronze	
2015 (4 x 0.5km)	El Salvador; Irma Margarita Aldana; Rosa Celina Escobar; Erick Saúl Hernández; José Vladimir Maravilla	6:19	Costa Rica A Argenis Brenes; Kenneth Alexander Mejía; Alexandra Barrios; Chrisdyala Moraga	6:33	Costa Rica B Sam Vanderjeugt; Elian Gustavo Corrales; Nicole Jackson; Aicela González	6:52

== See also ==
- IAAF World Cross Country Championships
- NACAC Cross Country Championships
- Central American and Caribbean Cross Country Championships
- South American Cross Country Championships
