= El Salvador at the 2009 World Championships in Athletics =

- WA code: ESA

in Berlin
- Competitors: 2 (1 man, 1 woman)
- Medals: Gold 0 Silver 0 Bronze 0 Total 0

World Championships in Athletics appearances
- 1983; 1987; 1991; 1993; 1995; 1997; 1999; 2001; 2003; 2005; 2007; 2009; 2011; 2013; 2015; 2017; 2019; 2022; 2023; 2025

El Salvador competed at the 2009 World Championships in Athletics in Berlin, Germany, which were held from 15 to 23 August 2009. The athlete delegation consisted of two competitors, racewalkers Marco Benavides and Cristina López. They competed in the men's 50 kilometres walk and women's 20 kilometres walk, respectively. Benavides did not finish his race while López placed 37th, El Salvador's best position in the event at the World Championships.

== Background ==
The 2009 World Championships in Athletics were held at the Olympiastadion in Berlin, Germany. Under the auspices of the International Amateur Athletic Federation, this was the twelfth edition of the World Championships. It was held from 15 to 23 August 2009 and had 47 different events. Among the competing nations was El Salvador. For this edition of the World Championships, racewalkers Marco Benavides and Cristina López competed for the nation. This was both of their debuts for El Salvador at the World Championships in Athletics. They competed in the men's 50 kilometres walk and women's 20 kilometres walk, respectively.

== Results ==
=== Men ===
Benavides competed in the men's 50 kilometres walk on 21 August against 48 other competitors. Though, Benavides would not complete the entire event and was recorded with a "did not finish" result.

Track and road events

Event	Athletes	Final	
Event	Athletes	Result	Rank
50 km race walk	Marco Benavides	Did not finish	

=== Women ===
López competed in the women's 20 kilometres walk on 16 August against 47 other competitors. There, she recorded a time of 1:47:33 and set a new season's best, placing 37th out of the 37 competitors that finished the race. López's placement remains as El Salvador's highest placement in the event as of the 2022 World Athletics Championships.

Track and road events

Event	Athletes	Final	
Event	Athletes	Result	Rank
20 km race walk	Cristina López	1:47:33 SB	37
