= Athletics Association of Barbados =

Governing body for athletics in Barbados

- Sport: Athletics
- Jurisdiction: Association
- Abbreviation: AAB
- Founded: 1947
- Affiliation: IAAF
- Affiliation date: 1966
- Regional affiliation: NACAC
- Headquarters: St. Michael, Barbados
- President: Catherine Jordan
- Vice president: June Caddle
- Secretary: Trevor Welch
- Replaced: Amateur Athletic Association of Barbados

Official website
- aab.sports.bb
- (Barbados)

The Athletics Association of Barbados (AAB) is the governing body for the sport of athletics in Barbados.

== History ==
AAB was founded in 1947 as Amateur Athletic Association of Barbados (AAAB), and was affiliated to the IAAF in 1966. In 2012, the name was changed to Athletics Association of Barbados.

Esther Maynard has been president of the association since 2004 and was re-elected in 2008. General Secretary Catherine Jordan assumed office in January 2013.

== Affiliations ==
AAB is the national member federation for Barbados in the following international organisations:

- International Association of Athletics Federations (IAAF)
- North American, Central American and Caribbean Athletic Association (NACAC)
- Association of Panamerican Athletics (APA)
- Central American and Caribbean Athletic Confederation (CACAC)

Moreover, it is part of the following national organisations:

- Barbados Olympic Association (BOA)

== National records ==
AAB maintains the Barbadian records in athletics.
