= Bolivia at the 2023 World Athletics Championships =

- Flag of Bolivia
- WA code: BOL

in Budapest, Hungary 19 August 2023 – 27 August 2023
- Competitors: 1 (0 men and 1 woman)
- Medals: Gold 0 Silver 0 Bronze 0 Total 0

World Athletics Championships appearances
- 1983; 1987; 1991; 1993; 1995; 1997; 1999; 2001; 2003; 2005; 2007; 2009; 2011; 2013; 2015; 2017; 2019; 2022; 2023; 2025

Bolivia competed at the 2023 World Athletics Championships in Budapest, Hungary, which were held from 19 to 27 August 2023. The athlete delegation of the country was composed of one competitor, racewalker Ángela Castro who would compete in the women's 20 kilometres walk. She qualified for the Championships after her rank was high enough in the World Athletics Rankings. In the finals, she placed 39th out of the 40 athletes who finished the race.

== Background ==
The 2023 World Athletics Championships in Budapest, Hungary, were held from 19 to 27 August 2023. The Championships were held at the National Athletics Centre. To qualify for the World Championships, athletes had to reach an entry standard (e.g. time or distance), place in a specific position at select competitions, be a wild card entry, or qualify through their World Athletics Ranking at the end of the qualification period.

Racewalker Ángela Castro would be the sole representative for the nation at the championships. She qualified after she ranked high enough in the World Athletics Rankings for the women's 20 kilometres walk. Initially, long-distance runner Héctor Garibay was set to be the sole representative but withdrew to focus on the 2023 Pan American Games. Before the Championships, Castro was trained by Olympian Paquillo Fernández. They traveled to Budapest on 16 August. This participation was Castro's fifth appearance for Bolivia at the World Athletics Championships.

== Results ==
Key

- Q = Qualified for the next round
- q = Qualified for the next round as a fastest loser or, in field events, by position without achieving the qualifying target
- NR = National record
- PB = Personal best
- SB = Season best
- N/A = Round not applicable for the event

=== Women ===
Castro competed in the women's 20 kilometres walk on 20 August against 46 other athletes who started. She recorded a time of 1:40:01, placing 39th out of the 40 athletes who finished the race.

Track and road events

Athlete	Event	Final	
Athlete	Event	Result	Rank
Ángela Castro	20 kilometres walk	1:40:01	39
