= Ligue d'Athlétisme de la Guyane =

Governing body for the athletics in French Guiana

- Sport: Athletics
- Abbreviation: LAG
- Founded: January 10, 1963
- Affiliation: Fédération française d'athlétisme
- Location: Cayenne
- President: Gaëtan Tariaffe
- Vice president: Annie-Claude Lafontaine
- Replaced: Ligue Régionale d'Athlétisme de la Guyane

Official website
- www.athle973.com
- /

The Ligue d'Athlétisme de la Guyane (LAG) is the governing body for the sport of athletics in French Guiana. Last president was Daniel Lapompe-Paironne. He was replaced by Gaëtan Tariaffe.

As LAG is part of the Fédération française d'athlétisme, athletes from French Guiana normally participate internationally for France, e.g., in European Athletics Championships as organized by the EAA. On the other hand, French Guiana as a French overseas department is part of the Caribbean. As an observer member of CACAC, French Guiana is invited to participate at the championships, and also at the CARIFTA Games.

== History ==
LAG was founded on January 10, 1963, as the Ligue Régionale d'Athlétisme de la Guyane. First president was Victor Périgny.

== Affiliations ==
- Fédération française d'athlétisme (FAA)

LAG is an observer member federation for French Guiana in the

- Central American and Caribbean Athletic Confederation (CACAC)

LAG is invited to participate at the

- CARIFTA Games

== Regional records ==
LAG maintains the French Guiana records in athletics.
