= Panamanian Athletics Federation =

Governing body for the sport of athletics in Panama

- Federación Panameña de Atletismo
- Sport: Athletics
- Jurisdiction: Panama
- Abbreviation: FEPAT
- Founded: 1945
- Affiliation: World Athletics
- Regional affiliation: CONSUDATLE
- Headquarters: Panama City
- President: Mario Quintero
- Vice president: Ricardo Concepción
- Secretary: Abel Garcia
- Other key staff: Amed Alberto Sanchez
- (Panama)

The Panamanian Athletics Federation (Spanish: Federación Panameña de Atletismo, FEPAT) is the governing body for the sport of athletics in Panama. Current president is Mario Quintero who was elected in February 2019 for the period 2019–2022.

== History ==
FEPAT was founded in 1945.

== Affiliations ==
FEPAT is the national member federation for Panama in the following international organisations:

- International Association of Athletics Federations (IAAF)
- Confederación Sudamericana de Atletismo (CONSUDATLE; South American Athletics Confederation)
- Association of Panamerican Athletics (APA)
- Asociación Iberoamericana de Atletismo (AIA; Ibero-American Athletics Association)
- Central American and Caribbean Athletic Confederation (CACAC)
- Confederación Atlética del Istmo Centroamericano (CADICA; Central American Isthmus Athletic Confederation)

Moreover, it is part of the following national organisations:

- Comité Olímpico de Panamá

== Members ==
FEPAT comprises the provincial athletics leagues of Panama.

== National records ==
FEPAT maintains the list of Panamanian records in athletics.
