= Ligue de Martinique d'Athlétisme =

Governing body for athletics in Martinique

- Sport: Athletics
- Abbreviation: LMA
- Founded: 2008
- Affiliation: Fédération française d'athlétisme
- Location: Fort-de-France
- President: Hugues PARSEMAIN
- Vice president: Lydia DELIN
- Secretary: Myriam SACAMA-ISIDORE
- Replaced: Ligue Régionale d'Athlétisme de Martinique

Official website
- liguemque.athle.com

The Ligue de Martinique d'Athlétisme (LMA) is the governing body for the sport of athletics in Martinique. The current president is Max Morinière. He was elected for the first time in November 2010, and re-elected in October 2012.

As LMA is part of the Fédération française d'athlétisme, athletes from Martinique normally participate internationally for France, for example, in the European Athletics Championships as organized by the EAA. On the other hand, Martinique as a French overseas department is part of the Caribbean. As an observer member of CACAC, Martinique is invited to participate at the championships, and also at the CARIFTA Games.

== History ==
LMA was founded on November 29, 2008, replacing the Ligue Régionale d'Athlétisme de Martinique.

== Affiliations ==
- Fédération française d'athlétisme (FAA)

LMA is an observer member federation for Martinique in the

- Central American and Caribbean Athletic Confederation (CACAC)

LMA is invited to participate at the

- CARIFTA Games

== Regional records ==
LMA maintains the Martinique records in athletics.
