= Federation of Mexican Athletics Associations =

Sports governing body in Mexico

- Federación Mexicana de Asociaciones de Atletismo
- Sport: Athletics
- Jurisdiction: Federation
- Abbreviation: FMAA
- Founded: 1925
- Affiliation: IAAF
- Affiliation date: 1933
- Regional affiliation: NACAC
- Headquarters: Iztacalco, Distrito Federal
- President: Antonio Lozano Pineda
- Vice president: Sergio Barajas
- Secretary: Christian Martínez
- Replaced: Federación Mexicana de Atletismo

Official website
- fmaa.apps-mexico.com
- (Mexico)

The Federation of Mexican Athletics Associations (Spanish: Federación Mexicana de Asociaciones de Atletismo, FMAA) is the governing body for the sport of athletics in Mexico. As of 2013, its president was Antonio Pineda Lozano.

== History ==
FMAA was founded in 1925 as Federación Atlética Nacional or Federación Atlética Mexicana and after changing its name to Federación Mexicana de Atletismo (FMA) was affiliated to the IAAF in 1933. In May 2011, the Federación Mexicana de Asociaciones de Atletismo was created.

== Affiliations ==
FMAA is the national member federation for Mexico in the following international organisations:

- International Association of Athletics Federations (IAAF)
- North American, Central American and Caribbean Athletic Association (NACAC)
- Association of Panamerican Athletics (APA)
- Asociación Iberoamericana de Atletismo (AIA; Ibero-American Athletics Association)
- Central American and Caribbean Athletic Confederation (CACAC)

Moreover, it is part of the following national organisations:

- Mexican Olympic Committee (COM; Comité Olímpico Mexicano)

== Members ==
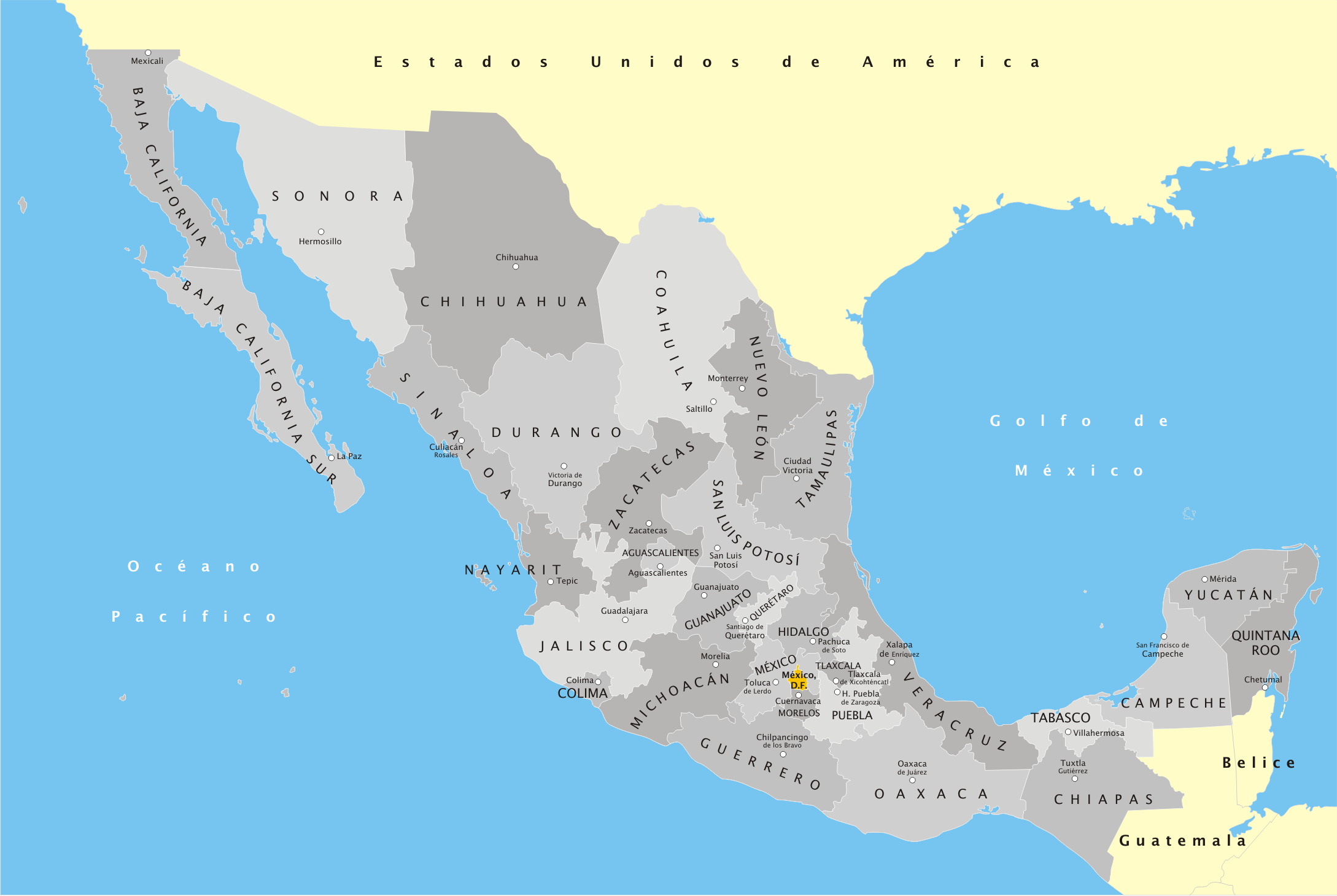

FMAA comprises the associations of the Mexican States, the federal district, and of IMSS, IPN and U.N.A.M.

State	Organisation	Link
Aguascalientes	Asociación de Atletismo del Estado de Aguascalientes, A.C.	
Baja California	Asociación de Atletismo del Estado de Baja California, A.C.	
Baja California Sur	Asociación de Atletismo de Baja California Sur, A.C.	
Campeche	Asociación de Atletismo de Campeche	
Chiapas	Asociación Chiapaneca de Atletismo, A.C.	
Chihuahua	Asociación Estatal de Atletismo de Chihuahua, A.C.	www.aeachihuahua.com
Coahuila	Asociación de Atletismo del Estado de Coahuila, A.C.	
Colima	Asociación de Atletismo del Estado de Colima, A.C.	
Distrito Federal	Asociación De Atletismo De Pista Y Campo Del Distrito Federal	
Durango	Asociación de Atletismo del Estado de Durango	
Guanajuato	Asociación de Atletismo del Estado de Guanajuato	
Guerrero	Asociación de Atletismo del Estado de Guerrero	
Hidalgo	Asociación de Atletismo del Estado de Hidalgo	
Jalisco	Asociación Jaliciense de Clubes Atléticos, A.C.	
Mexico	Asociación de Atletismo del Estado de México, A.C.	www.atletismoedomex.com
Michoacán	Asociación Michoacana de Atletismo, A.C.	
Morelos	Asociación de Atletismo del Estado de Morelos, A. C	
Nayarit	Asociación de Atletismo del Estado de Nayarit	
Nuevo León	Asociación de Atletismo del Estado de Nuevo León, A.C.	www.asociaciondeatletismonl.com
Oaxaca	Asociación de Atletismo del Estado de Oaxaca	
Puebla	Asociación Poblana de Atletismo, A.C.	
Querétaro	Asociación Queretana de Atletismo, A.C.	
Quintana Roo	Asociación Quintanaroense de Atletismo, A.C.	
San Luis Potosí	Asociación de Atletismo del Estado de San Luis Potosí, A.C.	
Sinaloa	Asociación Estatal de Atletismo de Sinaloa	
Sonora	Asociación de Atletismo del Estado de Sonora	
Tabasco	Asociación de Atletismo del Estado de Tabasco	
Tamaulipas	Asociación de Atletismo del Estado de Tamaulipas	
Tlaxcala	Asociación Atlética de Tlaxcala, A.C.	
Veracruz	Asociación Veracruzana de Atletismo, A.C.	www.avatletismo.com.mx
Yucatán	Asociación de Atletismo del Estado de Yucatán	
Zacatecas	Asociación de Atletismo del Estado de Zacatecas	
Mexican Social Security Institute	Asociación de Atletismo del Instituto Mexicano del Seguro Social	
National Polytechnic Institute	Asociación de Atletismo del Instituto Politécnico Nacional	
National Autonomous University of Mexico	Asociación de Atletismo de la Universidad Nacional Autónoma de México	www.deportes.unam.mx

== National records ==
FMAA maintains the Mexican records in athletics.
