= Bolivian Athletics Federation =

Sports governing body

- Federación Atlética de Bolivia
- Sport: Athletics
- Jurisdiction: Federation
- Abbreviation: FAB
- Founded: February 20, 1929
- Affiliation: IAAF
- Regional affiliation: CONSUDATLE
- Affiliation date: March 1929
- Headquarters: Cochabamba
- President: Gonzalo Prado
- Vice president: Nelson Acebey
- Secretary: César Condori

Official website
- www.atlebolivia.net
- (Bolivia)

The Bolivian Athletics Federation (FAB; Spanish: Federación Atlética de Bolivia) is the governing body for the sport of athletics in Bolivia. Current president is Gonzalo Prado. He was elected in May 2010.

== History ==
FAB was founded on February 20, 1929. First president was Julio de Zabala.

== Affiliations ==
FAB is the national member federation for Bolivia in the following international organisations:

- International Association of Athletics Federations (IAAF)
- Confederación Sudamericana de Atletismo (CONSUDATLE; South American Athletics Confederation)
- Association of Panamerican Athletics (APA)
- Asociación Iberoamericana de Atletismo (AIA; Ibero-American Athletics Association)

Moreover, it is part of the following national organisations:

- Bolivian Olympic Committee (Spanish: Comité Olímpico Boliviano)

== Members ==
FAB comprises the regional associations of Bolivia.

== National records ==
FAB maintains the Bolivian records in athletics.
