= Salvadoran Athletics Federation =

Governing body for the sport of athletics in El Salvador

- Federación Salvadoreña de Atletismo
- Sport: Athletics
- Jurisdiction: Federation
- Abbreviation: FEDEATLETISMO
- Founded: 1943
- Affiliation: WA before IAAF
- Regional affiliation: NACAC
- Headquarters: San Salvador
- President: Juan Carlos Ramírez
- Vice president: Ruth Daniela Gonzalez
- Secretary: Carlos Clemente
- (El Salvador)

The Salvadoran Athletics Federation (Spanish: Federacion Salvadoreña de Atletismo, FEDEATLETISMO) is the governing body for the sport of athletics in El Salvador.

== History ==
El Salvador athletes participated already at the 1st Central American and Caribbean Games in 1926 in Ciudad de México. In 1935, the Estadio Nacional De la Flor Blanca was inaugurated to host the 3rd Central American and Caribbean Games. FEDEATLETISMO was founded only in 1943. Another source reports the foundation not before 1946/1947.

Former president was José Benjamín Ruiz. After more than twenty years in office, he was replaced by odontologist and ex pole-vaulter Juan Carlos Ramírez in January 2013. He was re-elected in December 2013, but the Olympic Committee of El Salvador did not recognise the result. The acknowledgement of the World Athletics (WA) before IAAF arrive on 2017. In 2018 during the General Assembly of Federations affiliated with the Olympic Committee of El Salvador (COES) held on March 24, the Athletics Federation was recognized again.

== Affiliations ==
FEDEATLETISMO is the national member federation for El Salvador in the following international organisations:

- International Association of Athletics Federations (IAAF)
- North American, Central American and Caribbean Athletic Association (NACAC)
- Association of Panamerican Athletics (APA)
- Asociación Iberoamericana de Atletismo (AIA; Ibero-American Athletics Association)
- Central American and Caribbean Athletic Confederation (CACAC)
- Confederación Atlética del Istmo Centroamericano (CADICA; Central American Isthmus Athletic Confederation)

Moreover, it is part of the following national organisations:

- Olympic Committee of El Salvador (Spanish: Comité Olímpico de El Salvador)

== National records ==
FEDEATLETISMO maintains the list of Salvadoran records in athletics.
