= 2023 USA Cross Country Championships =

USA Cross Country Championships

- Venue: Pole Green Park, Richmond, Virginia
- Dates: 21 January 2023

The 2023 USA Cross Country Championships was the 132nd edition of the USA Cross Country Championships. The USA Cross Country Championships took place at Pole Green Park in Richmond, Virginia, on 21 January 2023 and served as the US Trials for 44th edition of 2023 World Athletics Cross Country Championships (6 member teams) in Bathurst, Australia on 18 February 2023.

== Results ==
Race results

=== Men ===
Position	Athlete	Time
1st place, gold medalist(s)	Emmanuel Bor	28:44
2nd place, silver medalist(s)	Andrew Colley	28:48
3rd place, bronze medalist(s)	Anthony Rotich	28:49
4	Leonard Korir	28:49
5	Sam Chelanga	28:49
6	Dillon Maggard	28:49
7	Reid Buchanan	28:49
8	Hillary Bor	28:57
9	Abbabiya Simbassa	29:02
10	Zach Panning	29:06

=== Women ===
Position	Athlete	Time
1st place, gold medalist(s)	Ednah Kurgat	32:07
2nd place, silver medalist(s)	Makena Morley	32:24
3rd place, bronze medalist(s)	Emily Durgin	32:27
4	Emily Lipari	32:32
5	Weini Kelati	32:39
6	Katie Izzo	32:40
7	Allie Buchalski	33:02
8	Susanna Sullivan	33:14
9	Laura Thweatt	33:17
10	Carrie Verdon	33:33

=== U-20 Men ===
Position	Athlete	Time
1st place, gold medalist(s)	Emilio Young	23:47
2nd place, silver medalist(s)	Micah Wilson; University of Wisconsin, Madison	23:54
3rd place, bronze medalist(s)	Marco Langon; Villanova University	23:54
4	Evan Jenkins; University of Washington	23:55
5	Max Sannes; United States Air Force Academy	23:55
6	Luke Venhuizen; University of Michigan	23:59
7	Kole Mathison	24:12
8	Austin Henderson; University of Wisconsin, Madison	24:20
9	Caleb Jarema; University of Michigan	24:22
10	Shane Griepentrog; University of Minnesota, Twin Cities	24:23

=== U-20 Women ===
Position	Athlete	Time
1st place, gold medalist(s)	Irene Riggs	19:45
2nd place, silver medalist(s)	Ellie Shea	19:48
3rd place, bronze medalist(s)	Zariel Macchia	20:05
4	Abbey Nechanicky	20:07
5	Karrilynn Baloga	20:07
6	Eva Klingbeil; University of North Carolina, Chapel Hill	20:11
7	Peyton Schieppe; Bradley University	20:26
8	Allie Zealand	20:32
9	Ali Weimer; University of Minnesota, Twin Cities	20:53
10	Elia Ton-That; Columbia University	21:04
