= USA Cross Country Championships =

National running championship

- Date: Mid-February
- Location: United States
- Event type: Cross country running
- Distance: 10 km for men 10 km for women 8 km for junior men 6 km for junior women
- Established: 1890
- Website: USA Cross Country Championships

The USA Cross Country Championships is the annual national championships for cross country running in the United States. The championships is generally held in mid-February and it serves as a way of designating the country's national champion, as well as acting as the selection race for the IAAF World Cross Country Championships.

The competition, currently run under the auspices of USA Track & Field, traces its history back to 1883. The competition was held sporadically until 1905 at which point it has been held every year since. The National Championship has been sponsored by multiple organizations over the years, some of them holding competing championships. It has thus been known under a variety of names.

Women did not have a championship until 1964. Until 1979, women's championships were segregated from the men, on the same date in a different location.

Currently there are two major Cross Country Championship events, generally referred to as the "Fall Championships" and the "Winter Championships." The Fall Championships generally happen in late November or early December, which corresponds with the end of the broader cross country season from late-August into November. Since 1998, those have been known as the USATF National Club Cross Country Championships. The Winter Championships generally happen in late January or early February and since they are three months after the broader season, are geared towards selecting the international team for the World Championships which is generally held in late March. Since 2011, the World Championships are only held in odd numbered years but USA continues to hold Winter Championships every year.

There are currently several races held at the Fall Championships, the number of races depends on the number of entries. In addition to the open races for each gender, there are masters championships in each age division. Open and masters men run 10K up to age 60. 60 and above run 8K races. All women's divisions run 6K, but masters run at least one separate race. When there are a large number of entries, even the one division can be broken into an A section and a B section to make the number of runners on the course manageable.

There are currently four races held at each Winter Championships: the men's 12 km open race, the women's 8 km open race, a junior men's race of 8 km and a junior women's race of 6 km. All four serve as selection races for the IAAF World Championships in which the top six runners from each race gain qualification. Each race awards medals on an individual basis and a team basis (where the performances by athletes belonging to a certain running club or sponsor are combined). Between 1998 and 2006 the championships featured short course races of 4 km for both men and women – these races are now discontinued. Occasionally, masters races, determined by age group, are held as part of the championships.

Lynn Jennings won the championship nine times between 1985 and 1996, when there was only the one championship for women. She is the only competitor to have won the USA Cross Country Championships and IAAF World Championships in the same year, having done so three times consecutively in 1990, 1991 and 1992. Prior to the existence of the World Championships, Doris Brown pulled the same feat four times, three consecutively with the "International Championships" in 1967, 1969, 1970 and 1971. While Brown also won the 1968 International Championship, part of five in a row, she lost the November 1967 US Championship to Vicki Foltz. Pat Porter won eleven of the various men's championships over a seven-year period of time between 1982 and 1989, including eight Fall Championships in a row. In the 1930s, Don Lash won seven in a row (1934-1940).

One set of brothers; Bill Ashenfelter and Horace Ashenfelter have won championships. Two sets of spouses have won championships; Cathy Branta (Easker) (1984) and John Easker (1986); Shayne Culpepper and Alan Culpepper. The Culpeppers did it on the same day, February 16, 2003.

The competition has been televised in the past on ESPN2.

== History ==
The first events claiming the National Championship moniker were the "Amateur Individual Cross Country Championship of America" hosted by the New York Athletic Club (NYAC) in Mott Haven, Bronx starting in 1883. In 1887, the National Cross Country Association (NCCA) began holding championships. Both organizations held championships in 1887. Coincidentally, both were won by Edward C. Carter. NCCA held their last championship in 1892 at the Morris Park Racecourse. NYAC revived the series in 1897 also at Morris Park. The Knickerbocker Athletic Club hosted in the same location in April 1898 but in November of the same year, the Amateur Athletic Union (AAU) held their first such event "The Cross-Country Individual and Team Championship of the A.A.U." AAU's second championship wasn't until 1903 but in between, the 1901 Pan-American Exposition in Buffalo, New York hosted a race regarded as a national championship. AAU's third race was in 1905, called the “National Cross Country Championship of the A.A.U.” and the championship has been held continuously since, under that name until the demise of the AAU as the national governing body in 1979. The championship for some seasons has fallen on opposite sides of the new year occasionally. The first race in Van Cortlandt Park was held in 1912, that venue has been a frequent host of the championship ever since, 25 times, even as recently as 2006. The first championship not held in the state of New York was 1917, when it was held in Franklin Park in Boston. To date, a championship has been held in 31 different states.

In 1962, the U.S. Track & Field Federation (USTFF) began holding a competing “National Cross Country Championship of the U.S.T.F.F.” in the same week as the AAU. Most were in different venues, but the two 1964 championships were both held in Washington Park, Chicago two days apart. The same situation happened in 1968 at Van Cortlandt Park. In 1969, Jack Bacheler won both championships, USTFF at Penn State on November 26 and AAU at Bloomfield Hills, Michigan on November 29. The following year, his teammate Frank Shorter accomplished the same feat. Craig Virgin technically duplicated it in 1977, after winning USTFF, he finished second to British athlete Nick Rose at the AAU. By being the first American citizen to cross the finish line, Virgin was the AAU National Champion that year. Starting in 1975, the AAU added the “World Cross Country Championship Senior Men's Trials” in February at a more appropriate time to select an international team to the IAAF World Cross Country Championships. In 1979 the USTFF renamed itself Track and Field Association, USA using the acronym USTFA for two years. There is no evidence USTFF or USTFA ever held a championship for women.

As the new national governing body, The Athletics Congress (TAC) began administering the “National Cross Country Championship of T.A.C.” a month later. TAC changed its name to USATF in 1993, first holding "The U.S.A.T.F. National Cross Country Championship."

A Women's national championship was added in 1964. The women's championship was held at a separate location on the same date until 1979. In the last season of the AAU administration it was finally combined to the same location and date as the men.

In 1998, the IAAF World Cross Country Championships began long course and short course championships, USATF commensurately held long and short course championships as qualifiers. 1998 was the first year women joined the men in holding a separate qualifier, at the same unified location. Prior to that, the women qualified to the World Championships based on their Championship about three months earlier. That same year, the Fall Championships were renamed the USATF National Club Cross Country Championships, with the USATF website redirecting the lineage of National Championship history to the February event.

While the championship has predominantly been held in the last two weeks of November, aligning with the close of the traditional fall season on the scholastic level, it has occurred in eight different months around the year. In 1998, 1999, 2001 and 2003, the Fall Championship locations and dates were chosen to correspond with the location of the USATF Annual Meeting.

== International qualifier ==
While the International Cross Country Championships existed back to 1898 for men and 1931 for women, the United States did not send representatives to participate until 1966 (when Tracy Smith brought home a bronze medal) for men and 1967 for women (after the women's event had not been held for 10 years). Those representatives were selected from the National Championship race. Doris Brown won the 1967 Championship and the next four championships after that. By 1970, USA hosted the 1970 International Cross Country Championships for women in Frederick, Maryland but the event was segregated from the men's championship in Vichy, France the following day, though there was a women's race also held in Vichy resulting in two champions that year, one of them Brown.

In 1973, the International Championships gave way to the new IAAF World Cross Country Championships. In 1973, US men did not participate but US women won the team bronze medal. US men again did not participate in the 1974 World Championships, though the US Junior Men did participate and won the team gold medal behind Rich Kimball's individual win over future Olympic medalist John Treacy. US men decided to take the World Championships seriously in 1975, holding a separate qualifying event in February. US women did not hold a separate qualifying race, then combined with the men, until 1998.

== Editions ==
=== Men only race ===
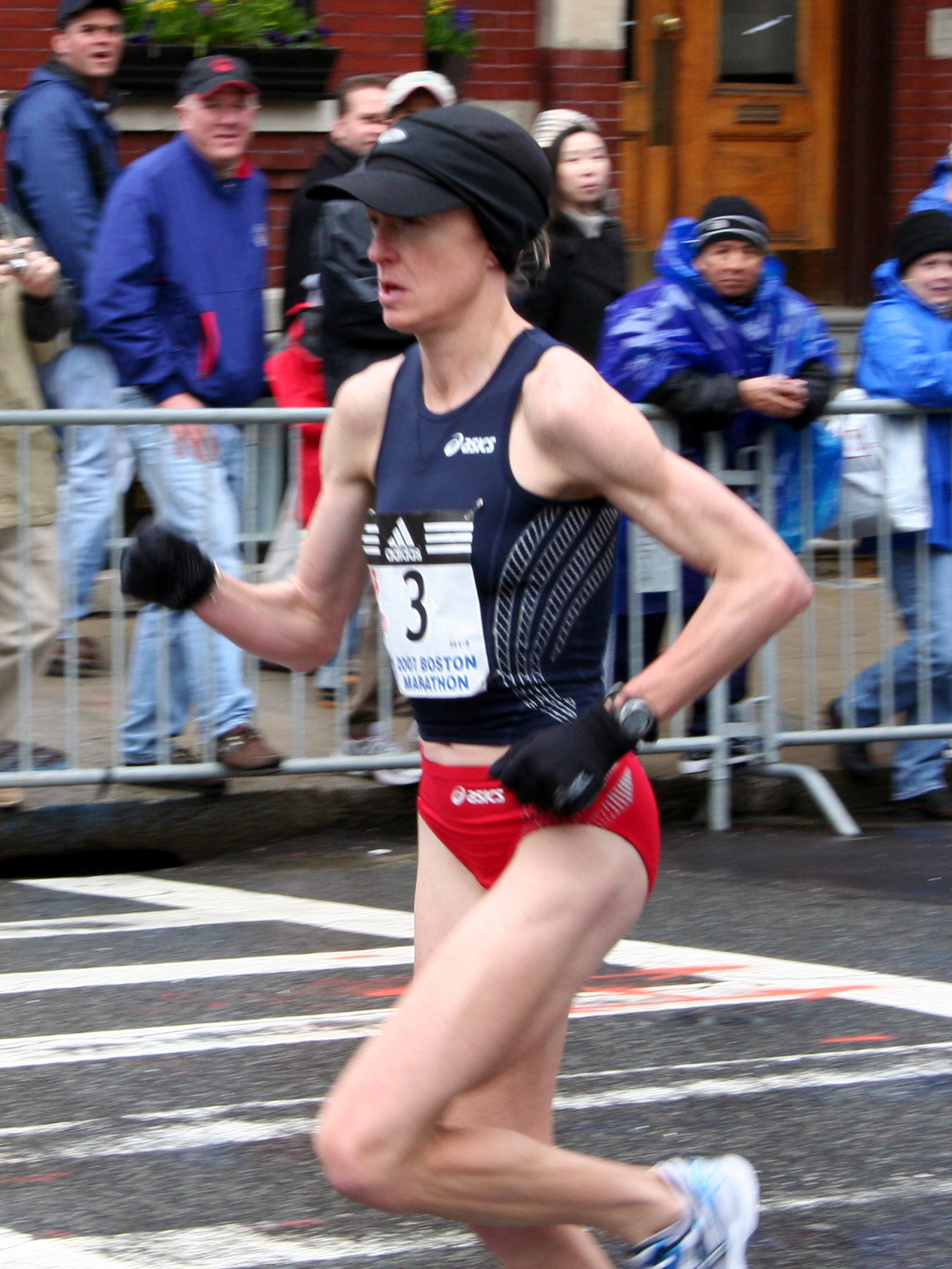
Deena Kastor (Drossin) has won the long race on seven occasions.

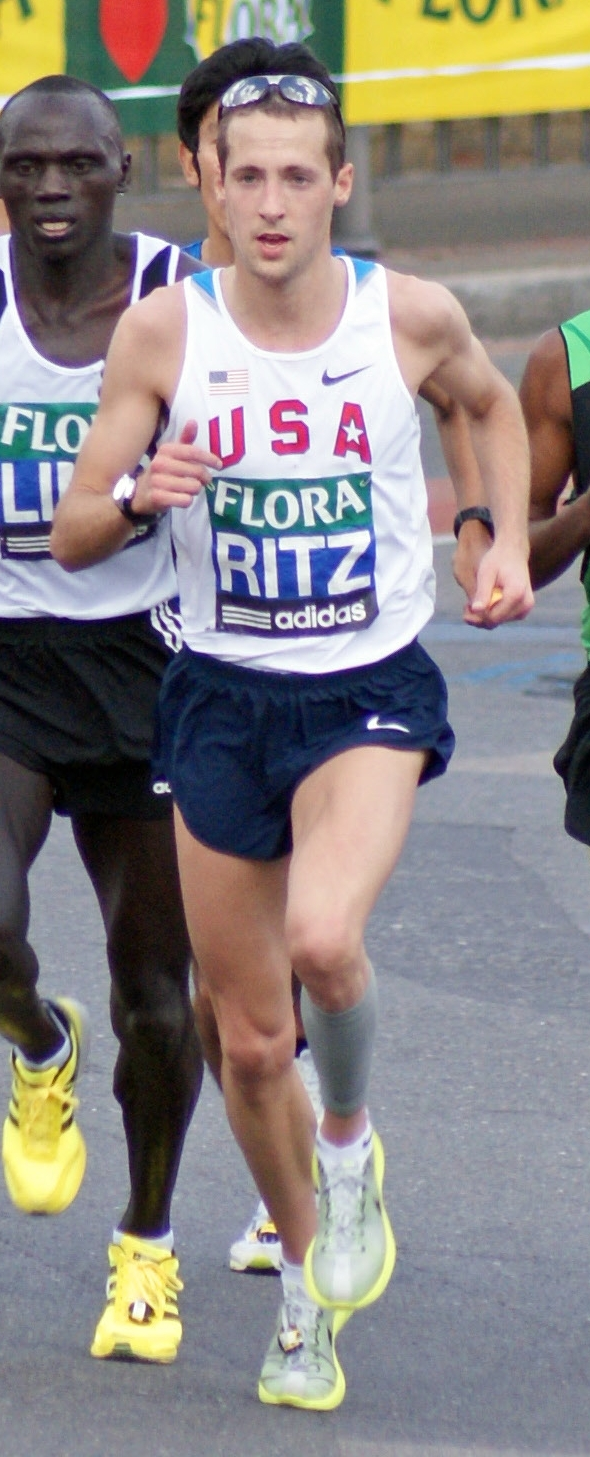
Dathan Ritzenhein is a three-time USA Cross Country champion.

Key

NYAC sponsored NCCA sponsored Knickerbocker Athletic Club sponsored AAU sponsored Pan-American Exposition sponsored USTFF sponsored

Season	Venue	Location	Winner	Time	Distance	Date
1883
1883	Mott Haven	New York City, New York	Thomas Delaney	26:30	4.25 miles	November 6, 1883
1884
1884	Mott Haven	New York City, New York	D.D. McTaggart	29:53	≈ 5 miles	November 4, 1884
1885
1885	Mott Haven	New York City, New York	Edward Carter	29:07	≈ 4.5 miles	November 5, 1885
1886
1886	Mott Haven	New York City, New York	Edward Carter	31:51	5 miles	November 2, 1886
1887
1887	Highbridge Park	New York City, New York	Edward Carter	56:44	8 miles	April 30, 1887
1887	Mott Haven	New York City, New York	Edward Carter	34:52	5 miles	November 8, 1887
1888
1888	Fleetwood Driving Park	New York City, New York	Edward Carter	41:35	≈ 8 miles	April 28, 1888
1889
1889	Mott Haven	New York City, New York	Willie Day	45:31	≈ 8 miles	May 4, 1889
1890
1890	Morris Park	New York City, New York	Willie Day	47:41	8 miles	April 26, 1890
1891
1891	Morris Park	New York City, New York	M. Kennedy	46:30	8 miles	April 25, 1891
1892
1892	Morris Park	New York City, New York	Edward Carter	43:54	8 miles	April 30, 1892
1893-6			Not held			
1897
1897	Morris Park	New York City, New York	George Orton Canada; F.J. Hjertberg	35:58; 36:25	6.25 miles	April 3, 1897
1898
1898	Morris Park	New York City, New York	George Orton Canada; J.F. Malloy	35:41; 36:24	6.25 miles	April 2, 1898
1898	Morris Park	New York City, New York	A.I. Wright	38:33	6.5 miles	November 26, 1898
1899-1900			Not held			
1901
1901	Pan-American Exposition	Buffalo, New York	Jerry Pierce	43:27	8miles	September 7, 1901
1902			Not held			
1903	Travers Island	New York City, New York	John J. Joyce	32:23	≈ 6 miles	November 3, 1903
1904			Not held			
1905	Travers Island	New York City, New York	W.J. Hail	32:59	6 miles	November 30, 1905
1906	Travers Island	New York City, New York	Frank Nebrich	34:29	6 miles	December 15, 1906
1907	Celtic Park	New York City, New York	Frank Bellars	33:12	6.25 miles	November 23, 1907
1908	Celtic Park	New York City, New York	Frank Bellars	34:15	6.25 miles	November 14, 1908
1909	Celtic Park	New York City, New York	Willie Kramer	31:17	6.5 miles	November 20. 1909
1910	Celtic Park	New York City, New York	Frank Bellars	33:03	≈ 6 miles	November 26, 1910
1911	Celtic Park	New York City, New York	Willie Kramer	37:08	6.25 miles	November 18, 1911
1912	Van Cortlandt Park	New York City, New York	Willie Kramer	34:32	6 miles	November 30, 1912
1913	Van Cortlandt Park	New York City, New York	Abel Kiviat	33:52	6 miles	December 6, 1913
1914	Van Cortlandt Park	New York City, New York	Hannes KolehmainenFinland; Arthur J. Fogel	33:36; 33:49	6.12 miles	December 12, 1914
1915	Van Cortlandt Park	New York City, New York	Nick Giannakopoulos	32:46	6 miles	January 8, 1916
1916	Van Cortlandt Park	New York City, New York	Ville Kyrönen Finland (3)John W. Overton	32:46; 33:33	6 miles	December 9, 1916
1917	Franklin Park	Boston, Massachusetts	James Henigan	33:58	≈ 6 miles	November 24, 1917
1918	Van Cortlandt Park	New York City, New York	Max Bohland	33:00	6 miles	November 30, 1918
1919	Van Cortlandt Park	New York City, New York	Fred Faller	32:26	6 miles	November 29, 1919
1920	Franklin Park	Boston, Massachusetts	Fred Faller	29:01	5.5 miles	November 20, 1920
1921	Schenley Park	Pittsburgh, Pennsylvania	R. Earl Johnson	24:23	5 miles	November 19, 1921
1922	Van Cortlandt Park	New York City, New York	Ville Ritola Finland; R. Earl Johnson	34:37; 35:41	6.5 miles	November 25, 1922
1923	Fairmount Park	Philadelphia, Pennsylvania	Ville Ritola Finland	31:56	6.25 miles	November 24, 1923
1924	Van Cortlandt Park	New York City, New York	Fred Wachsmuth	31:35	6 miles	November 29, 1924
1925	Van Cortlandt Park	New York City, New York	Ville Ritola Finland; Fred Wachsmuth	29:27	6.25 miles	November 21, 1925
1926	Van Cortlandt Park	New York City, New York	Ville Ritola Finland	30:02	6.25 miles	November 21, 1926
1927	Van Cortlandt Park	New York City, New York	Ville Ritola Finland	29:27	6 miles	November 26, 1927
1928	Van Cortlandt Park	New York City, New York	Gus Moore	31:18	6 miles	November 18, 1928
1929	Van Cortlandt Park	New York City, New York	Gus Moore	31:10	6 miles	December 8, 1928
1930	Lincoln Park	Jersey City, New Jersey	William Zepp	29:43	6 miles	November 30, 1930
1931	Eastern Michigan University	Ypsilanti, Michigan	Clark Chamberlain	29:40	6 miles	November 28, 1931
1932	Kenwood Country Club	Cincinnati, Ohio	Joseph McCluskey	32:36	6 miles	December 3, 1932
1933	Washington Park	Chicago, Illinois	Ray Sears	32:51	10K	October 28, 1933
1934	Finkbine Field	Iowa City, Iowa	Don Lash	32:17	10K	November 29, 1934
1935	Van Cortlandt Park	New York City, New York	Don Lash	32:42	10K	November 23, 1935
1936	Branch Brook Park	Newark, New Jersey	Don Lash	32:37	10K	November 29, 1936
1937	Branch Brook Park	Newark, New Jersey	Don Lash	32:57	10K	November 28, 1937
1938	Branch Brook Park	Newark, New Jersey	Don Lash	34:33	10K	November 27, 1938
1939	Branch Brook Park	Newark, New Jersey	Don Lash	32:26	10K	November 20, 1939
1940	Meadowbrook Country Club	Northville, Michigan	Don Lash	30:25	10K	November 28, 1940
1941	Empire City Race Track	Yonkers, New York	Greg Rice	29:19	10K	November 9, 1941
1942	Weequahic Park	Newark, New Jersey	Frank Dixon	32:52	10K	November 29, 1942
1943	Clifton Park	Baltimore, Maryland	William Hulse	32:41	10K	November 25, 1943
1944	Clifton Park	Baltimore, Maryland	James Rafferty	31:38	10K	November 23, 1944
1945	Delaware Park	Buffalo, New York	Thomas Quinn	34:14	10K	November 25, 1945
1946	Van Cortlandt Park	New York City, New York	Robert Black	32:46	10K	November 30, 1946
1947	Van Cortlandt Park	New York City, New York	Curt Stone	32:28	10K	November 29, 1947
1948	Warren Valley Course	Detroit, Michigan	Robert Black	30:00	10K	November 27, 1948
1949	Warren Valley Course	Detroit, Michigan	Fred Wilt	30:31	10K	December 3, 1949
1950	Franklin Park	Boston, Massachusetts	Browning Ross	31:24	6 miles	November 25, 1950
1951	Fairmount Park	Philadelphia, Pennsylvania	Bill Ashenfelter	30:26	10K	December 16, 1951
1952	Delaware Park	Buffalo, New York	Fred Wilt	32:31	10K	November 30, 1952
1953	Delaware Park	Buffalo, New York	Fred Wilt	31:17	10K	November 29, 1953
1954	Fairmount Park	Philadelphia, Pennsylvania	Gordon McKenzie	29:27	10K	November 29, 1954
1955	Delaware Park	Buffalo, New York	Horace Ashenfelter	31:39	10K	November 20, 1955
1956	Fairmount Park	Philadelphia, Pennsylvania	Horace Ashenfelter	30:08	10K	December 9, 1956
1957	Washington Park	Chicago, Illinois	John Macy	31:12	10K	December 7, 1957
1958	Washington Park	Chicago, Illinois	John Macy	29:47	10K	December 6, 1958
1959	Bellarmine College	Louisville, Kentucky	Al Lawrence Australia; John Macy	32:22.4; 32:27	6.75 miles	November 26, 1959
1960	Bellarmine College	Louisville, Kentucky	Al Lawrence Australia (3) John Gutknecht	31:20.8; 31:41	10K	November 24, 1960
1961	Bellarmine College	Louisville, Kentucky	Bruce Kidd Canada; John Gutknecht	32:02.6; 32:08	10K	November 23, 1961
1962
1962	Ohio State Golf Course	Columbus, Ohio	Leslie Hegedus	31:58	10K	November 22, 1962
1962	Washington Park	Chicago, Illinois	Pete McArdle	29:53	6.18 miles	November 24, 1962
1963
1963	Washington Park	Chicago, Illinois	Tom O'Hara	30:12	10K	November 28, 1963
1963	Van Cortlandt Park	New York City, New York	Bruce Kidd Canada; Pete McArdle	30:47	10K	November 30, 1963

=== Split gender divisions ===
AAU Men's division AAU Women's division AAU World Championship Trials TAC Men's division TAC Women's division TAC World Championship Trials USTFF sponsored

Season	Venue	Location	Winner	Time	Distance	Date
1964
1964	Washington Park	Chicago, Illinois	Dan Shaughnessy	30:57	10K	November 26, 1964
1964	Washington Park	Chicago, Illinois	Dave Ellis Canada; William Morgan	30:49; 31:10	10K	November 28, 1964
1964		Seattle, Washington	Marie Mulder	6:51	2K	November 28, 1964
1965
1965	Echo Hills Golf Course	Wichita, Kansas	John Lawson	28:50	6 miles	November 25, 1965
1965	Van Cortlandt Park	New York City, New York	Ron Larrieu	31:11	10K	November 27, 1965
1965		Cambridge, Massachusetts	Sandra Knott	9:06	1.5 miles	November 27, 1965
1966
1966	Echo Hills Golf Course	Wichita, Kansas	Tarry Harrison	29:57	6 miles	November 24, 1966
1966	Pierce College	Woodland Hills, California	Ron Larrieu	31:23	10K	November 26, 1966
1966			Doris Brown			
1967
1967	Fort Collins Country Club	Colorado Springs, Colorado	Arjan Gelling	31:58	10K	November 25, 1967
1967	Washington Park	Chicago, Illinois	Ken Moore	30:08	10K	November 25, 1967
1967			Vicki Foltz			
1968
1968	Van Cortlandt Park	New York City, New York	Tarry Harrison	30:05	10K	November 28, 1968
1968	Van Cortlandt Park	New York City, New York	John Mason	30:34	10K	November 30, 1968
1968			Doris Brown			
1969
1969	Penn State University	University Park, Pennsylvania	Jack Bacheler	29:35	6 miles	November 26, 1969
1969		Bloomfield Hills, Michigan	Jack Bacheler	30:49	10K	November 29, 1969
1969			Doris Brown			
1970
1970	Penn State University	University Park, Pennsylvania	Frank Shorter	29:01	6 miles	November 25, 1970
1970	Washington Park	Chicago, Illinois	Frank Shorter	30:15	10K	November 28, 1970
1970		Saint Louis, Missouri	Doris Brown	10:39	2 miles	November 28, 1970
1971
1971	Stone Mountain Golf Course	Stone Mountain, Georgia	Edward Leddy	29:56	6 miles	November 24, 1971
1971	UC San Diego	La Jolla, California	Frank Shorter	29:19	10K	November 27, 1971
1971		Wickliffe, Ohio	Doris Brown	14:29.4	4K	November 27, 1971
1972
1972	North Texas State	Denton, Texas	John Halberstadt	29:01	6 miles	November 22, 1972
1972	Washington Park	Chicago, Illinois	Frank Shorter	30:42	10K	November 25, 1972
1972	El Dorado Regional Park	Long Beach, California	Francie Larrieu	13:27	4K	November 25, 1972
1973
1973	Balboa Park	San Diego, California	Ed Mendoza	29:39	6 miles	November 24, 1973
1973	University of Florida	Gainesville, Florida	Frank Shorter	29:52	10K	November 24, 1973
1973		Albuquerque, New Mexico	Francie Larrieu	17:17	3 miles	November 24, 1973
1974
1974	University of Michigan	Ann Arbor, Michigan	Pat Mandera	29:39	6 miles	November 27, 1974
1974	Crystal Springs	Belmont, California	John Ngeno Kenya (3) Ted Castaneda	29:58.8; 30:22.9	10K	November 30, 1974
1974		Bellbrook, Ohio	Lynn Bjorklund	17:31	3 miles	November 30, 1974
1974	University of Florida	Gainesville, Florida	Frank Shorter	46:32	15K	February 9, 1975
1975
1975	Coonskin Park	Charleston, West Virginia	Alex Kasich	32:04	6 miles	November 29, 1975
1975	Eisenhower Golf Club	Annapolis, Maryland	Greg Fredericks	28:57	10K	November 30, 1975
1975	Crystal Springs	Belmont, California	Lynn Bjorklund	16:32.6	3 miles	November 29, 1975
1975	Crystal Springs	Belmont, California	Gary Tuttle	37:24	12K	January 31, 1976
1976
1976	Yahara Hills	Madison, Wisconsin	Mike Slack	29:41	6 miles	October 23, 1976
1976	Fairmount Park	Philadelphia, Pennsylvania	Ric Rojas	30:23	10K	November 27, 1976
1976		Miami, Florida	Jan Merrill	16:37	3 miles	November 27, 1976
1976	Alameda Municipal Golf Course	Alameda, California	Mike Bordell	42:47	9 miles	February 19, 1977
1977
1977	Yahara Hills	Madison, Wisconsin	Craig Virgin	28:31	6 miles	October 22, 1977
1977	Buffalo Bayou Park	Houston, Texas	Nick Rose United Kingdom; Craig Virgin	30:14.3; 30:22	10K	November 26, 1977
1977		San Bernardino, California	Jan Merrill	16:55	5K	November 26, 1977
1977		Atlanta, Georgia	Dan Dillon	42:47	12K	January 28, 1978
1978
1978	Yahara Hills	Madison, Wisconsin	Craig Virgin	28:42	6 miles	October 21, 1978
1978	West Seattle Golf Course	Seattle, Washington	Greg Meyer	29:35	10K	November 25, 1978
1978		Memphis, Tennessee	Julie Brown	16:32	5K	November 25, 1978
1978		Atlanta, Georgia	Marc Hunter	36:27	12K	February 10, 1979

=== Combined gender divisions ===
AAU Men's division AAU Women's division AAU World Championship Trials TAC Men's division TAC Women's division TAC World Championship Trials USTFA sponsored

Season	Venue	Location	Winner	Time	Distance	Date
1979
1979	Wayne E. Dannehl Course; University of Wisconsin, Parkside	Kenosha, Wisconsin	Herb Lindsay	24:12	5 miles	October 20, 1979
1979	North Carolina State	Raleigh, North Carolina	Alberto Salazar	30:27	10K	November 24, 1979
1979	North Carolina State	Raleigh, North Carolina	Margaret Groos	16:53.9	5K	November 24, 1979
1979	Lane Community College	Eugene, Oregon	Craig Virgin	36:43	12K	January 19, 1980
1980
1980	University of Nevada, Reno	Reno, Nevada	Jairo Correa	31:56	10K	October 25, 1980
1980	Idaho State University	Pocatello, Idaho	Jon Sinclair	31:46	10K	November 29, 1980
1980	Idaho State University	Pocatello, Idaho	Mary Shea	18:18.7	5K	November 29, 1980
1980	E. P. "Tom" Sawyer State Park	Louisville, Kentucky	Craig Virgin	36:09	12K	January 19, 1981
1981
1981	DeBell Golf Course	Burbank, California	Adrian RoyleUnited Kingdom; Alberto Salazar	27:20; 27:22	10K*	November 28, 1981
1981	DeBell Golf Course	Burbank, California	Julie Brown	15:49	5K	November 28, 1981
1981	Idaho State University	Pocatello, Idaho	Alberto Salazar	36:09	12K	February 15, 1982
1982
1982	Meadowlands Racetrack	East Rutherford, New Jersey	Pat Porter	28:50	10K	November 28, 1982
1982	Meadowlands Racetrack	East Rutherford, New Jersey	Leslie Welch	15:52	5K	November 28, 1982
1982	Southern Illinois University	Edwardsville, Illinois	Alberto Salazar	36:34	12K	February 20, 1983
1983
1983	Penn State Blue Golf Course	State College, Pennsylvania	Pat Porter	29:18	10K	November 26, 1983
1983	Penn State Blue Golf Course	State College, Pennsylvania	Betty Jo Geiger	16:31	5K	November 26, 1983
1983	Meadowlands Racetrack	East Rutherford, New Jersey	Pat Porter	34:47	12K	February 19, 1984
1984
1984	Franklin Park	Boston, Massachusetts	Pat Porter	28:06	10K	November 24, 1984
1984	Franklin Park	Boston, Massachusetts	Cathy Branta	15:19	5K	November 24, 1984
1984	Cottonwood Creek Golf Course	Waco, Texas	Ed Eyestone	36:09	12K	February 16, 1985
1985
1985	Meredith College	Raleigh, North Carolina	Pat Porter	30:33	10K	November 30, 1985
1985	Meredith College	Raleigh, North Carolina	Lynn Jennings	17:28	5K	November 30, 1985
1985	Cottonwood Creek Golf Course	Waco, Texas	Pat Porter	35:07	12K	February 15, 1986
1986
1986	Golden Gate Park Polo Fields	San Francisco, California	Pat Porter	30:36	10K	November 29, 1986
1986	Golden Gate Park Polo Fields	San Francisco, California	Leslie Welch	16:51	5.2K	November 29, 1986
1986	Trinity Park	Dallas, Texas	John Easker	36:54	12K	February 14, 1987
1987
1987	Van Cortlandt Park	New York City, New York	Pat Porter	29:58	10K	November 28, 1987
1987	Van Cortlandt Park	New York City, New York	Lynn Jennings	19:35	6K	November 28, 1987
1987	Trinity Park	Dallas, Texas	George Nicolas	38:13	12K	February 13, 1988
1988
1988	Meredith College	Raleigh, North Carolina	Pat Porter	31:07	10K	November 26, 1988
1988	Meredith College	Raleigh, North Carolina	Lynn Jennings	19:32	6K	November 26, 1988
1988	Tyee Valley Golf Course	SeaTac, Washington	Pat Porter	37:54	12K	February 4, 1989
1989
1989	Golden Gate Park Polo Fields	San Francisco, California	Pat Porter	32:08	10K	November 25, 1989
1989	Golden Gate Park Polo Fields	San Francisco, California	Lynn Jennings	21:11	6K	November 25, 1989
1989	Tyee Valley Golf Course	SeaTac, Washington	Ed Eyestone	33:39	12K	February 10, 1990
1990
1990	Van Cortlandt Park	New York City, New York	Bob Kempainen	30:23	10K	November 25, 1990
1990	Van Cortlandt Park	New York City, New York	Lynn Jennings	19:07	6K	November 25, 1990
1990	Florida State University	Tallahassee, Florida	Aaron Ramirez	34:48	12K	February 2, 1991
1991
1991	Franklin Park	Boston, Massachusetts	Todd Williams	29:18	10K	November 30, 1991
1991	Franklin Park	Boston, Massachusetts	Lynn Jennings	19:24	6K	November 30, 1991
1991	Plough Park	Memphis, Tennessee	Shannon Butler	35:46	12K	February 8, 1992
1992
1992	Wayne E. Dannehl Course; University of Wisconsin, Parkside	Kenosha, Wisconsin	Bob Kennedy	29:41	10K	November 28, 1992
1992	Wayne E. Dannehl Course; University of Wisconsin, Parkside	Kenosha, Wisconsin	Lynn Jennings	20:26	6K	November 28, 1992
1992	Sandy High School	Sandy, Oregon	Todd Williams	36:45	12K	February 6, 1993

=== USATF era ===
Key

Women's Fall Championship Women's Winter Short Course Championship (World Championship Trials) Women's Winter Long Course Championship (World Championship Trials) Men's Fall Championship Men's Winter Short Course Championship (World Championship Trials) Men's Winter Long Course Championship (World Championship Trials)

Season	Venue	Location	Winner	Time	Distance	Date
1993
1993	University of Montana	Missoula, Montana	Todd Williams	26:55	10K	November 27, 1993
1993	University of Montana	Missoula, Montana	Lynn Jennings	20:18	6K	November 27, 1993
1993	Plough Park	Memphis, Tennessee	Bob Kennedy	36:25	12K	February 5, 1994
1994
1994	Blue Lake Regional Park	Portland, Oregon	Reuben Reina	30:00	10K	December 4, 1994
1994	Blue Lake Regional Park	Portland, Oregon	Olga Appell	18:15	5.9K	December 4, 1994
1995
1995	Franklin Park	Boston, Massachusetts	Brad Schlapak	28.41	9.9K	December 3, 1995
1995	Franklin Park	Boston, Massachusetts	Joan Nesbit	19:05	6K	December 3, 1995
1996
1996	Stanford Golf Course	Palo Alto, California	Reuben Reina	29:06	10K	December 7, 1996
1996	Stanford Golf Course	Palo Alto, California	Lynn Jennings	21:06	6.5K	December 7, 1996
1997
1997	Blue Lake Regional Park	Portland, Oregon	Tim Hacker	27:31	10K	December 7, 1997
1997	Blue Lake Regional Park	Portland, Oregon	Deena Drossin	26:35	8K	December 7, 1997
1997	ESPN Wide World of Sports Complex	Lake Buena Vista, Florida	Dan Browne	11:08	4K	January 31, 1998
1997	ESPN Wide World of Sports Complex	Lake Buena Vista, Florida	Amy Rudolph	12:38	4K	January 31, 1998
1997	ESPN Wide World of Sports Complex	Lake Buena Vista, Florida	Nnenna Lynch	26:45	8K	January 31, 1998
1998
1998	ESPN Wide World of Sports Complex	Lake Buena Vista, Florida	Andre Williams	28:59	10K	December 6, 1998
1998	ESPN Wide World of Sports Complex	Lake Buena Vista, Florida	Blake Phillips-Russell	20:06	6K	December 6, 1998
1998	Lake Spanaway Golf Course	Tacoma, Washington	Adam Goucher	10:29	4K	February 13, 1999
1998	Lake Spanaway Golf Course	Tacoma, Washington	Deena Drossin	25:15	8K	February 13, 1999
1998	Lake Spanaway Golf Course	Tacoma, Washington	Alan Culpepper	34:24	12K	February 14, 1999
1998	Lake Spanaway Golf Course	Tacoma, Washington	Amy Rudolph	11:59	4K	February 14, 1999
1999
1999	El Dorado Regional Park	Long Beach, California	Ray Appenheimer	28:59	10K	December 5, 1999
1999	El Dorado Regional Park	Long Beach, California	Collette Liss	20:28	6K	December 5, 1999
1999	Bryan Park	Greensboro, North Carolina	Adam Goucher	11:56	4K	February 12, 2000
1999	Bryan Park	Greensboro, North Carolina	Deena Drossin	27:48	8K	February 12, 2000
1999	Bryan Park	Greensboro, North Carolina	Adam Goucher	37:17	12K	February 13, 2000
1999	Bryan Park	Greensboro, North Carolina	Deena Drossin	13:30	4K	February 13, 2000
2000
2000	Franklin Park	Boston, Massachusetts	Matt Downin	29:01	10K	November 25, 2000
2000	Franklin Park	Boston, Massachusetts	Kim Fitchen	20:04	6K	November 25, 2000
2000	Fort Vancouver National Historic Site	Vancouver, Washington	Tim Broe	11:32	4K	February 17, 2001
2000	Fort Vancouver National Historic Site	Vancouver, Washington	Deena Drossin	26:14	8K	February 17, 2001
2000	Fort Vancouver National Historic Site	Vancouver, Washington	Meb Keflezighi	34:54	12K	February 18, 2001
2000	Fort Vancouver National Historic Site	Vancouver, Washington	Regina Jacobs	12:37	4K	February 18, 2001
2001
2001	Battleship Memorial Park	Mobile, Alabama	Jared Cordes	30:39	10K	December 1, 2001
2001	Battleship Memorial Park	Mobile, Alabama	Priscilla Hein	20:21	6K	December 1, 2001
2001	Fort Vancouver National Historic Site	Vancouver, Washington	Tim Broe	11:58	4K	February 9, 2002
2001	Fort Vancouver National Historic Site	Vancouver, Washington	Deena Drossin	26:31	8K	February 9, 2002
2001	Fort Vancouver National Historic Site	Vancouver, Washington	Meb Keflezighi	35:45	12K	February 10, 2002
2001	Fort Vancouver National Historic Site	Vancouver, Washington	Regina Jacobs	12:55	4K	February 10, 2002
2002
2002	Sierra College Course	Rocklin, California	Jared Cordes	31:26	10K	December 14, 2002
2002	Sierra College Course	Rocklin, California	Shayne Culpepper	21:47	6K	December 14, 2002
2002	Buffalo Bayou Park	Houston, Texas	Robert Gary	13:53	4K	February 15, 2003
2002	Buffalo Bayou Park	Houston, Texas	Deena Drossin	29:06	8K	February 15, 2003
2002	Buffalo Bayou Park	Houston, Texas	Alan Culpepper	38:22	12K	February 16, 2003
2002	Buffalo Bayou Park	Houston, Texas	Shayne Culpepper	15:10	4K	February 16, 2003
2003
2003	Bryan Park	Greensboro, North Carolina	Alan Webb	30:13	10K	December 7, 2003
2003	Bryan Park	Greensboro, North Carolina	Melissa Buttry	19:59.9	6K	December 7, 2003
2003	Fall Creek and 16th Street Park	Indianapolis, Indiana	Charlie Gruber	11:14	4K	February 7, 2004
2003	Fall Creek and 16th Street Park	Indianapolis, Indiana	Colleen De Reuck	26:16	8K	February 7, 2004
2003	Fall Creek and 16th Street Park	Indianapolis, Indiana	Bob Kennedy	35:03	12K	February 8, 2004
2003	Fall Creek and 16th Street Park	Indianapolis, Indiana	Shalane Flanagan	12:26	4K	February 8, 2004
2004
2004	Portland Meadows	Portland, Oregon	Jorge Torres	32:43.91	10K	December 5, 2004
2004	Portland Meadows	Portland, Oregon	Melissa Buttry	23:07.85	6K	December 5, 2004
2004	Fort Vancouver National Historic Site	Vancouver, Washington	Tim Broe	11:37.8	4K	February 12, 2005
2004	Fort Vancouver National Historic Site	Vancouver, Washington	Colleen De Reuck	27:24	8K	February 12, 2005
2004	Fort Vancouver National Historic Site	Vancouver, Washington	Dathan Ritzenhein	36:59.9	12K	February 13, 2005
2004	Fort Vancouver National Historic Site	Vancouver, Washington	Shalane Flanagan	13:24.3	4K	February 13, 2005
2005
2005	Genesee Valley Park	Rochester, New York	Matt Tegenkamp	29:49	10K	November 19, 2005
2005	Genesee Valley Park	Rochester, New York	Elizabeth Woodworth	20:29	6K	November 19, 2005
2005	Van Cortlandt Park	New York City, New York	Adam Goucher	10:50	3.9K	February 18, 2006
2005	Van Cortlandt Park	New York City, New York	Blake Phillips-Russell	26:47	7.9K	February 18, 2006
2005	Van Cortlandt Park	New York City, New York	Ryan Hall	34:38	11.9K	February 19, 2006
2005	Van Cortlandt Park	New York City, New York	Carrie Tollefson	12:32	3.9K	February 19, 2006
2006
2006	Golden Gate Park Polo Fields	San Francisco, California	Matt Downin	30:13	10K	December 9, 2006
2006	Golden Gate Park Polo Fields	San Francisco, California	Amy Rudolph	19:59	6K	December 9, 2006
2006	Flatirons Golf Course	Boulder, Colorado	Deena Drossin	26:47	8K	February 10, 2007
2006	Flatirons Golf Course	Boulder, Colorado	Alan Culpepper	37:09	12K	February 10, 2007
2007
2007	Voice of America Park	West Chester, Ohio	Ryan Warrenburg	31:46.9	10K	December 8, 2007
2007	Voice of America Park	West Chester, Ohio	Delilah DiCrescenzo	20:30.7	6K	December 8, 2007
2007	Mission Bay	San Diego, California	Shalane Flanagan	25:26	8K	February 16, 2008
2007	Mission Bay	San Diego, California	Dathan Ritzenhein	35:03	12K	February 16, 2008
2008
2008	Plantes Ferry Recreation Park	Spokane, Washington	Scott Bauhs	30:47	10K	December 13, 2008
2008	Plantes Ferry Recreation Park	Spokane, Washington	Rebecca Donaghue	19:59	6K	December 13, 2008
2008	Agricultural History Farm Park	Derwood, Maryland	Emily Brown	26:58	8K	February 7, 2009
2008	Agricultural History Farm Park	Derwood, Maryland	Meb Keflezighi	36:06	12K	February 7, 2009
2009
2009	Masterson Park	Lexington, Kentucky	David Jankowski	29:18	10K	December 9, 2009
2009	Masterson Park	Lexington, Kentucky	Serena Burla	20:23	6K	December 9, 2009
2009	Plantes Ferry Recreation Park	Spokane, Washington	Shalane Flanagan	26:47	8K	February 13, 2010
2009	Plantes Ferry Recreation Park	Spokane, Washington	Dathan Ritzenhein	34:34	12K	February 13, 2010
2010
2010	McAlpine Park	Charlotte, North Carolina	Aaron Braun	29:35.3	10K	December 11, 2010
2010	McAlpine Park	Charlotte, North Carolina	Renee Metivier Baillie	19:50.5	6K	December 11, 2010
2010	Mission Bay	San Diego, California	Shalane Flanagan	25:47	8K	February 5, 2011
2010	Mission Bay	San Diego, California	Brent Vaughn	35:46	12K	February 5, 2011
2011
2011	Jefferson Park Golf Course	Seattle, Washington	Jonathan Grey	29:38	10K	December 10, 2011
2011	Jefferson Park Golf Course	Seattle, Washington	Brie Felnagle	19:54	6K	December 10, 2011
2011	Forest Park	St. Louis, Missouri	Sara Hall	26:50.1	8K	February 11, 2012
2011	Forest Park	St. Louis, Missouri	Bobby Mack	35:41.4	12K	February 11, 2012
2012
2012	Masterson Park	Lexington, Kentucky	Jacob Riley	29:58	10K	December 8, 2012
2012	Masterson Park	Lexington, Kentucky	Mattie Suver	20:01	6K	December 8, 2012
2012	Forest Park	St. Louis, Missouri	Shalane Flanagan	25:49.0	8K	February 8, 2013
2012	Forest Park	St. Louis, Missouri	Chris Derrick	35:38.6	12K	February 8, 2013
2013
2013	Rivers Edge Golf Course	Bend, Oregon	Joseph Gray	31:05	10K	December 14, 2013
2013	Rivers Edge Golf Course	Bend, Oregon	Laura Thweatt	21:43	6K	December 14, 2013
2013	Flatirons Golf Course	Boulder, Colorado	Amy VanAlstine	27:35	8K	February 15, 2014
2013	Flatirons Golf Course	Boulder, Colorado	Chris Derrick	36:14	12K	February 15, 2014
2014
2014	Lehigh Goodman Campus Course	Bethlehem, Pennsylvania	Ryan Hill	29:07.03	10K	December 13, 2014
2014	Lehigh Goodman Campus Course	Bethlehem, Pennsylvania	Laura Thweatt	19:15	6K	December 13, 2014
2014	Flatirons Golf Course	Boulder, Colorado	Laura Thweatt	27:42	8K	February 7, 2015
2014	Flatirons Golf Course	Boulder, Colorado	Chris Derrick	36:18	12K	February 7, 2015
2015
2015	Golden Gate Park Polo Fields	San Francisco, California	Garrett Heath	29:06	10K	December 12, 2015
2015	Golden Gate Park Polo Fields	San Francisco, California	Amy Van Alstine	19:51	6K	December 12, 2015
2015	Rivers Edge Golf Course	Bend, Oregon	Mattie Suver	36:38	10K	February 6, 2016
2015	Rivers Edge Golf Course	Bend, Oregon	Craig Lutz	31:40	10K	February 6, 2016
2016
2016	Apalachee Regional Park	Tallahassee, Florida	Samuel Chelanga	28:55	10K	December 10, 2016
2016	Apalachee Regional Park	Tallahassee, Florida	Colleen Quigley	19:31	6K	December 10, 2016
2016	Rivers Edge Golf Course	Bend, Oregon	Aliphine Tuliamuk-Bolton	34:24	10K	February 4, 2017
2016	Rivers Edge Golf Course	Bend, Oregon	Leonard Korir	30:12	10K	February 4, 2017
2017
2017	Masterson Park	Lexington, Kentucky	Ian La Mere	29:10	10K	December 9, 2017
2017	Masterson Park	Lexington, Kentucky	Sarah Pagano	19:40	6K	December 9, 2017
2017	Apalachee Regional Park	Tallahassee, Florida	Emily Infeld	33:19	10K	February 3, 2018
2017	Apalachee Regional Park	Tallahassee, Florida	Leonard Korir	29:17	10K	February 3, 2018
2018
2018	Plantes Ferry Sports Complex	Spokane, Washington	Ben Blankenship	29:21	10K	December 8, 2018
2018	Plantes Ferry Sports Complex	Spokane, Washington	Katie Mackey	19:35	6K	December 8, 2018
2018	Apalachee Regional Park	Tallahassee, Florida	Shelby Houlihan	32:46.8	10K	February 2, 2019
2018	Apalachee Regional Park	Tallahassee, Florida	Shadrack Kipchirchir	28:52.5	10K	February 2, 2019
2019
2019	Lehigh University	Bethlehem, Pennsylvania	Morgan Pearson	29:54	10K	December 14, 2019
2019	Lehigh University	Bethlehem, Pennsylvania	Aisling Cuffe	20:07	6K	December 14, 2019
2019	Mission Bay Park	San Diego, California	Natosha Rogers	35:44.3	10K	January 18, 2020
2019	Mission Bay Park	San Diego, California	Anthony Rotich	30:35.8	10K	January 18, 2020
2021
2021	Apalachee Regional Park	Tallahassee, Florida	Frankline Tonui	30:14.6	10K	December 11, 2021
2021	Apalachee Regional Park	Tallahassee, Florida	Natosha Rogers	19:42.0	6K	December 11, 2021
2021	Mission Bay Park	San Diego, California	Alicia Monson	34:01	10K	January 8, 2022
2021	Mission Bay Park	San Diego, California	Shadrack Kipchirchir	30:32	10K	January 8, 2022
2022
2022	Golden Gate Park	San Francisco, California	Cole Hocker	26:28	~9.6K	December 10, 2022
2022	Golden Gate Park	San Francisco, California	Bethany Hasz	17:54	~5.6K	December 10, 2022
2022	Pole Green Park	Richmond, Virginia	Ednah Kurgat	32:07	10K	January 21, 2023
2022	Pole Green Park	Richmond, Virginia	Emmanuel Bor	28:44	10K	January 21, 2023
2023
2023	Apalachee Regional Park	Tallahassee, Florida	Tai Dinger	30:48.0	10K	December 9, 2023
2023	Apalachee Regional Park	Tallahassee, Florida	Amanda Vestri	20:06.3	6K	December 9, 2023
2023	Pole Green Park	Richmond, Virginia	Weini Kelati	32:58.6	10K	January 20, 2024
2023	Pole Green Park	Richmond, Virginia	Cooper Teare	29:06.2	10K	January 20, 2024
2024
2024	Chambers Creek Regional Park	Tacoma, Washington	Kenneth Rooks	31:09	10K	December 14, 2024
2024	Chambers Creek Regional Park	Tacoma, Washington	Allie Buchalski	20:28	6K	December 14, 2024
2024	Chaparral Ridge Cross Country Course	Lubbock, Texas	Carrie Ellwood	34:22	10K	January 11, 2025
2024	Chaparral Ridge Cross Country Course	Lubbock, Texas	Benard Keter	29:43	10K	January 11, 2025
2025
2025	Glendoveer Golf Course	Portland, Oregon	Ethan Strand	5:25.8	2K	December 6, 2025
2025	Glendoveer Golf Course	Portland, Oregon	Gracie Morris	6:19.4	2K	December 6, 2025
2025	Glendoveer Golf Course	Portland, Oregon	Parker Wolfe	29:16.4	10K	December 6, 2025
2025	Glendoveer Golf Course	Portland, Oregon	Weini Kelati	33:45.5	10K	December 6, 2025

== See also ==
- USATF National Club Cross Country Championships
- USA Outdoor Track and Field Championships
- USA Indoor Track and Field Championships
- Foot Locker Cross Country Championships
- NCAA Men's Cross Country Championship
- NCAA Women's Cross Country Championship
