= 2020 USA Cross Country Championships =

Championship in USA

- Venue: Mission Bay Park, San Diego, California
- Dates: 18 January 2020

The 2020 USA Cross Country Championships was the 130th edition of the USA Cross Country Championships. The USA Cross Country Championships took place in San Diego, California, on 18 January 2020 and served as the US Trials for 4th edition of 2020 Pan American Cross Country Cup (6 member teams) in Victoria, Canada. The men's race was won by Anthony Rotich in 30:17. The women's race was won by Natosha Rogers in a time of 35:44. The junior (U-20) men's race was won by Corey Gorgas in 25:44. The junior (U-20) women's race was won by Brooke Rauber in a time of 22:11

== Results ==
Race results

=== Men ===
Position	Athlete	Nationality	Time
1st place, gold medalist(s)	Anthony Rotich	United States	30:17
2nd place, silver medalist(s)	Emmanuel Bor	United States	30:36
3rd place, bronze medalist(s)	Lawi Lalang	United States	30:40
4	Dillon Maggard	United States	30:49
5	Nicholas Hauger	United States	30:50
6	Matt Welch	United States	31:00
7	Michael Jordan	United States	31:11
8	David Goodman	United States	31:13
9	Tai Dinger	United States	31:29
10	Connor McMillan	United States	31:32

=== Women ===
Position	Athlete	Nationality	Time
1st place, gold medalist(s)	Natosha Rogers	United States	35:44
2nd place, silver medalist(s)	Paige Stoner	United States	36:06
3rd place, bronze medalist(s)	Carrie Verdon	United States	36:24
4	Sarah Pease	United States	36:38
5	Grace Graham-Zamudio	United States	36:57
6	Danielle Shanahan	United States	37:00
7	Tansey Lystad	United States	37:11
8	Calene Morris	United States	37:23
9	Cleo Whiting	United States	37:27
10	Catarina Rocha	United States	37:31

=== U-20 Men ===
Position	Athlete	Nationality	Time
1st place, gold medalist(s)	Corey Gorgas	United States	25:44
2nd place, silver medalist(s)	Evan Bishop	United States	26:21
3rd place, bronze medalist(s)	Bridger Altice	United States	26:38
4	Alex Comerford	United States	26:40
5	Gabe Simonsen	United States	27:14
6	Jacob Harris	United States	27:16
7	Javien Hale	United States	27:39
8	Lucas Chung	United States	27:53
9	Daniel Beam	United States	28:02
10	Deshawn Goodwin	United States	28:10

=== U-20 Women ===
Position	Athlete	Nationality	Time
1st place, gold medalist(s)	Brooke Rauber	United States	22:11
2nd place, silver medalist(s)	Rayna Stanziano	United States	22:47
3rd place, bronze medalist(s)	Kalea Bartolotto	United States	23:09
4	Bailey Brinkerhoff	United States	23:17
5	Sophia McDonnell	United States	23:22
6	Abigail Osterlund	United States	23:24
7	Justus Holden-Betts	United States	23:36
8	Karlie Callahan	United States	24:04
9	Kayla Fortino	United States	24:05
10	Kayla Byrne	United States	24:24
