= 2019 USA Cross Country Championships =

- Venue: Apalachee Regional Park, Tallahassee, Florida
- Dates: 2 February 2019

Champions
- Men: Shadrack Kipchirchir (28:52.5)
- Women: Shelby Houlihan (32:46.8)

The 2019 USA Cross Country Championships was the 129th edition of the USA Cross Country Championships. The USA Cross Country Championships took place in Tallahassee, Florida, on 2 February 2019 and served as the US Trials for 43rd edition of IAAF World Cross Country Championship (6 member teams). The men's race was won by Shadrack Kipchirchir in 28:52.5. The women's race was won by Shelby Houlihan in a time of 32:46.8.

== Results ==
Race results

=== Men ===
Position	Athlete	Nationality	Time
1st place, gold medalist(s)	Shadrack Kipchirchir	United States	28:53
2nd place, silver medalist(s)	Emmanuel Bor	United States	28:54
3rd place, bronze medalist(s)	Leonard Korir	United States	28:56
4	Hillary Bor	United States	28:57
5	Stanley Kebenei	United States	29:05
6	Scott Fauble	United States	29:21
7	Mason Ferlic	United States	29:32
8	Reid Buchanan	United States	29:36
9	Drew Hunter	United States	29:37
10	Martin Hehir	United States	29:38
11	Frankline Tonui	United States	29:38
12	Abbabiya Simbassa	United States	29:41
13	Alex Monroe	United States	29:48
14	Joel Reichow	United States	29:57
15	Andrew Colley	United States	30:00
16	Dillon Maggard	United States	30:00
17	David Elliott	United States	30:02
18	Evans Kirwa	United States	30:04
19	Seth Totten	United States	30:10
20	Lucas Stalnaker	United States	30:14
21	Futsum Zienasellassie	United States	30:18
22	Nicolas Montanez	United States	30:18
23	Garrett Heath	United States	30:20
24	Trevor Dunbar	United States	30:26
25	Girma Mecheso	United States	30:28
26	Kiya Dandena	United States	30:32
27	Timothy Rackers	United States	30:33
28	David Goodman	United States	30:46
29	Joseph Berriatua	United States	30:55
30	Michael Jordan	United States	30:57

=== Women ===
Position	Athlete	Nationality	Time
1st place, gold medalist(s)	Shelby Houlihan	United States	32:47
2nd place, silver medalist(s)	Molly Huddle	United States	32:56
3rd place, bronze medalist(s)	Marielle Hall	United States	32:57
4	Aliphine Tuliamuk	United States	33:04
5	Amy Cragg	United States	33:18
6	Courtney Frerichs	United States	33:25
7	Karissa Schweizer	United States	33:29
8	Stephanie Bruce	United States	33:30
9	Anne-Marie Blaney	United States	33:35
10	Sarah Pagano	United States	33:44
11	Elaina Tabb	United States	33:47
12	Rachel Schneider	United States	34:04
13	Kellyn Taylor	United States	34:16
14	Katrina Spratford	United States	34:19
15	Hannah Everson	United States	34:20
16	Jessica Tonn	United States	34:24
17	Samantha Bluske	United States	34:33
18	Laura Thweatt	United States	34:37
19	Breanna Sieracki	United States	34:38
20	Allie Buchalski	United States	34:41
21	Grayson Murphy	United States	34:48
22	Shannon Rowbury	United States	34:49
23	Lauren Larocco	United States	34:54
24	Catarina Rocha	United States	34:59
25	Olivia Pratt	United States	35:07
26	Samantha Nadel	United States	35:08
27	Rosa Moriello	United States	35:13
28	Bethany Sachtleben	United States	35:26
29	Emily Durgin	United States	35:29
30	Erika Kemp	United States	35:42
