= USATF National Club Cross Country Championships =

- Date: December
- Location: United States
- Event type: Cross country running
- Distance: 10 km for men 6 km for women
- Established: 1998
- Website: www.usatf.org/events/2022/2022-usatf-national-club-cross-country-championshi

The USATF National Club Cross Country Championships are an annual cross country competition for running clubs in the United States organized by USA Track & Field. The championships typically feature a 10K men's race and a 6K women's race, with the course changing every year. The first recorded race was held in Orlando, Florida in 1998.

The initial history of the competition was as part of the USA Cross Country Championships, founded in 1890. In 1975, the club element was partially divided from the main, individual focused national championship. The club event was held in fall while the individual event was held in winter. This arrangement became formal and permanent in 1998, with all national selections being moved to the winter competition and the USATF National Club Championships taking its current title.

Since 2018, this served as a selection meet for Great Stirling Cross Country meet in Scotland. The next event is scheduled for December 9, 2023 in Tallahassee, Florida.

== History ==
- Source of the results below is USATF's website

Year	Location	Facility	Men's Club Champion		Women's Club Champion	
Year	Location	Facility	Club Champion	Individual Champion	Club Champion	Individual Champion
1998	Orlando, Florida	Wide World of Sports Complex	Reebok Enclave	Andre Williams	Boston Athletic Association	Blake Phillips
1999	Long Beach, California	El Dorado Golf Course	Nike Farm Team	Ray Appenheimer	Nike Farm Team	Collette Liss
2000	Boston, Massachusetts	Franklin Park	Wisconsin Runner Racing Team	Matthew Downin	Boston Athletic Association	Kimberly Fitchen
2001	Mobile, Alabama	Battleship Memorial Park	Hansons' Running Shops	Jared Cordes	Indiana Invaders	Priscilla Hein
2002	Rocklin, California	Sierra College	Hansons' Running Shops	Jared Cordes	Nike Farm Team	Shayne Culpepper
2003	Greensboro, North Carolina	Bryan Park	Hansons-Brooks Distance Project	Alan Webb	Nike Farm Team	Melissa Buttry
2004	Portland, Oregon	Portland Meadows	Nike Farm Team	Jorge Torres	See Jane Run	Melissa Buttry
2005	Rochester, New York	Genesee Valley Park	Hansons-Brooks Distance Project	Matt Tegenkamp	See Jane Run	Elizabeth Woodworth
2006	San Francisco, California	Golden Gate Park Polo Fields	Zap Fitness	Matthew Downin	Boston Athletic Association	Amy Hastings
2007	West Chester Township, Ohio	Voice of America MetroPark	Zap Fitness	Ryan Warrenburg	Run Ohio Racing Team	Delilah DiCrescenzo
2008	Spokane, Washington	Plantes Ferry Recreation Park	McMillan Elite	Scott Bauhs	Boulder Running Company/Adidas	Rebecca Donaghue
2009	Lexington, Kentucky	Masterson Station Park	Zap Fitness	David Jankowski	Boulder Running Company/Adidas	Serena Burla
2010	Charlotte, North Carolina	McAlpine Park	McMillan Elite	Aaron Braun	McMillan Elite	Renee Metivier Baillie
2011	Seattle, Washington	Jefferson Park Golf Course	McMillan Elite	Jonathan Grey	Adidas TeamROGUE	Brie Felnagle
2012	Lexington, Kentucky	Masterson Station Park	Hansons-Brooks Distance Project	Jacob Riley	Team USA Minnesota	Mattie Suver
2013	Bend, Oregon	River's Edge Golf Course	Champions League Athletic	Joseph Gray	Beasts TC	Laura Thweatt
2014	Bethlehem, Pennsylvania	Lehigh University	Zap Fitness	Ryan Hill	Boston Athletic Association	Laura Thweatt
2015	San Francisco, California	Golden Gate Park Polo Fields	Hoka One One Northern Arizona Elite	Garrett Heath	Boston Athletic Association Adidas	Amy Van Alstine
2016	Tallahassee, Florida	Apalachee Regional Park	American Distance Project	Samuel Chelanga	Boston Athletic Association Adidas	Colleen Quigley
2017	Lexington, Kentucky	Masterson Station Park	Tinman Elite	Ian La Mere	Brooks Hansons-Brooks Distance Project	Sarah Pagano
2018	Spokane, Washington	Plantes Ferry Sports Complex	Tinman Elite	Ben Blankenship	Nomad Track Club	Katie Mackey
2019	Bethlehem, Pennsylvania	Lehigh University	Tinman Elite	Morgan Pearson	Hoka Aggie Running Club	Aisling Cuffe
2021	Tallahassee, Florida	Apalachee Regional Park	Hansons-Brooks Distance Project	Frankline Tonui	Hansons-Brooks Distance Project	Natosha Rogers
2022	San Francisco, California	Golden Gate Park	Hansons-Brooks Distance Project	Cole Hocker	Hansons-Brooks Distance Project	Bethany Hasz
2023	Tallahassee, Florida	Apalachee Regional Park	San Diego TC	Tai Dinger	Peninsula Distance Club	Amanda Vestri
2024	University Place, Washington	Chambers Bay	Roots Running Project	Kenneth Rooks	Minnesota Distance Elite	Allie Buchalski

== See also ==
- USA Cross Country Championships
