= Ashenfelter =

Ashenfelter is a surname. Notable people with the surname include:

- Bill Ashenfelter (1924–2010), American long-distance runner
- Horace Ashenfelter (1923–2018), American middle-distance runner
- Orley Ashenfelter (born 1942), American economist
