= 2022 USA Cross Country Championships =

USA Cross Country Championships

- Venue: Mission Bay Park, San Diego, California
- Dates: 8 January 2022

Champions
- Men: Shadrack Kipchirchir
- Women: Alicia Monson

The 2022 USA Cross Country Championships was the 131st edition of the USA Cross Country Championships. The USA Cross Country Championships took place in San Diego, California, on 8 January 2022 and served as the US Trials for 5th edition of 2022 Pan American Cross Country Cup (6 member teams) in Serra, Espírito Santo, Brazil. The men's race was won by Shadrack Kipchirchir in 30:32. The women's race was won by Alicia Monson in a time of 34:01. The junior (U-20) men's race was won by Gabe Simonsen in 25:42. The junior (U-20) women's race was won by Zariel Macchia in a time of 22:50.

== Results ==
Race results

=== Men ===
Position	Athlete	Time
1st place, gold medalist(s)	Shadrack Kipchirchir	30:32
2nd place, silver medalist(s)	Dillon Maggard	30:34
3rd place, bronze medalist(s)	Sam Chelanga	30:34
4	Leonard Korir	30:37
5	Benard Keter	30:49
6	Benjamin Eidenschink	31:07
7	Benjamin Blankenship	31:37
8	Caleb Webb	31:44
9	Futsum Zienasellassie	32:03
10	Theodorakis Medrano	32:06

=== Women ===
Position	Athlete	Time
1st place, gold medalist(s)	Alicia Monson	34:01
2nd place, silver medalist(s)	Weini Kelati	34:18
3rd place, bronze medalist(s)	Emily Infeld	34:36
4	Emily Durgin	34:50
5	Stephanie Bruce	34:50
6	Natosha Rogers	35:24
7	Jaci Smith	35:48
8	Molly Seidel	35:58
9	Carrie Verdon	36:01
10	Susanna Sullivan	36:11

=== U-20 Men ===
Position	Athlete	Time
1st place, gold medalist(s)	Gabe Simonsen	25:42
2nd place, silver medalist(s)	Chase Leach	25:50
3rd place, bronze medalist(s)	Cael Grotenhuis	26:22
4	Garrett Woodhoouse	26:44
5	William Dixon	26:57
6	Gabe Smit	27:01
7	Bahozhoni Church	27:30
8	Kutoven Stevens	27:47
9	Joshua Galindo	28:01
10	Micah Slivers	28:45

=== U-20 Women ===
Position	Athlete	Time
1st place, gold medalist(s)	Zariel Macchia	22:50
2nd place, silver medalist(s)	Colleen Stegmann	23:39
3rd place, bronze medalist(s)	Kaybree Christensen	23:51
4	Madison Eyman	23:53
5	Nora Wollen	24:10
6	Aisha Ramone	24:54
7	Olivia Gang	25:06
8	Emma Burgess	25:42
9	Madeline Castillo	25:54
10	Lia Castillo	25:59
