= Katie Izzo =

American long-distance runner

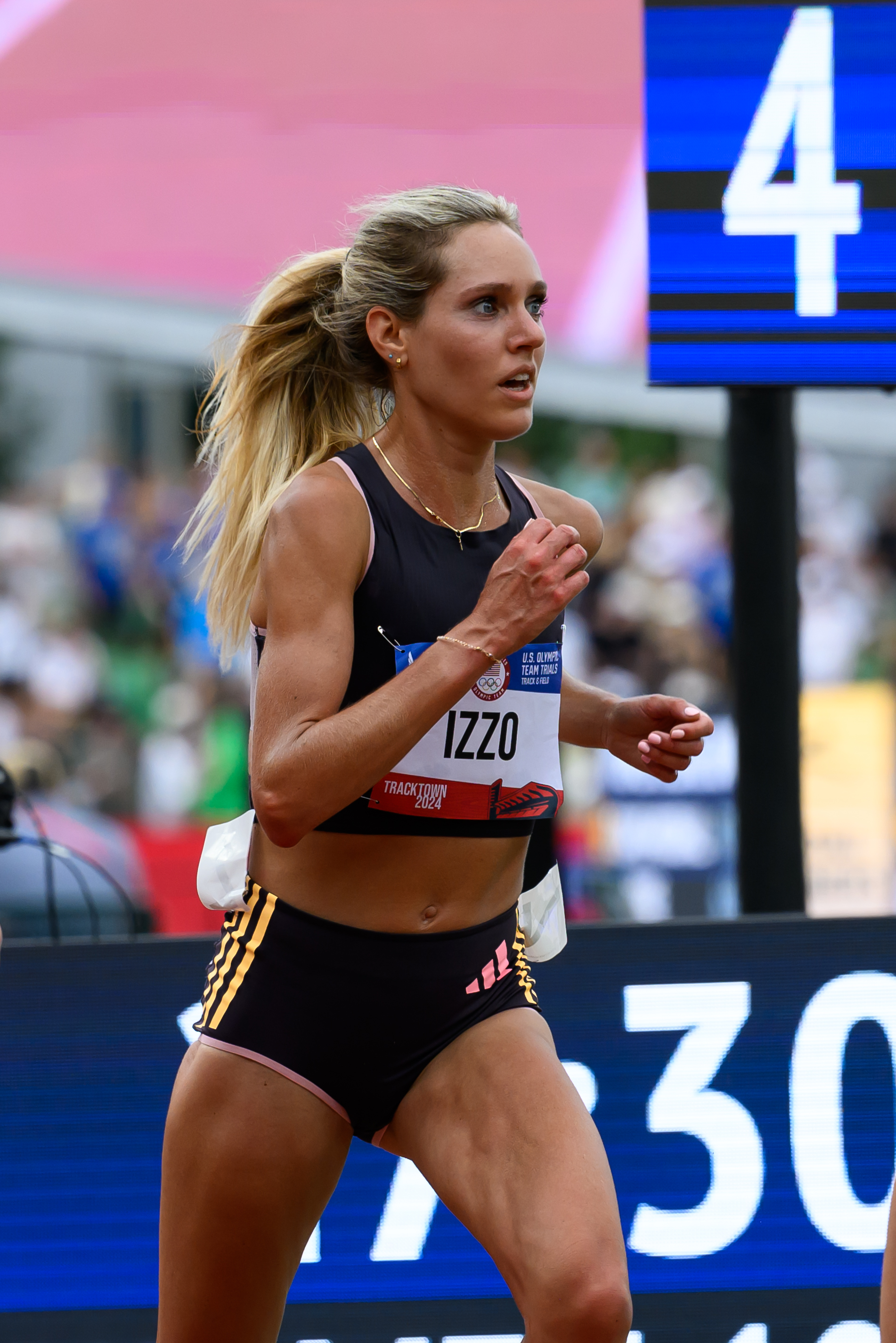
- Katie Izzo in the 10,000 meters at the 2024 USA Olympic Trials

Personal information
- Nationality: United States
- Born: 22 December 1996 (age 29)

Sport
- Sport: Athletics
- Events: Long distance running, Cross country running

Katie Izzo (born 22 December 1996) is an American middle- and long-distance, and cross country runner. She represented the United States at the 2023, 2024 and 2026 World Cross Country Championships.

== Early life ==
Izzo attended Catalina Foothills High School in Tucson, Arizona before moving with her family to Seal Beach, California, for her senior year of high school where she attended Los Alamitos High School.

== NCAA ==
Izzo graduated from California Polytechnic State University, San Luis Obispo in 2019. She missed considerable racing time after she suffered a broken tibia and fibula whilst competing in the 2016 NCAA West Regionals in Sacramento, and resultant recovery included the insertion of a titanium rod inside her tibia bone. She returned to have a top three finish at the 2018 Big West Conference Cross Country Championships.

Izzo transferred to the University of Arkansas for a recreation and sports management master’s degree and was part of the Arkansas women's cross country team that won the 2019 NCAA Division I cross country championships in Terre Haute, Indiana, placing third in the women’s individual race. In December 2019, Izzo ran the 5000 metres in 15:13.09 in Boston, Massachusetts, recording the second-fastst indoor time in collegiate history, less than a second from Emily Sisson's collegiate record.

Representing California Polytechnic State University, San Luis Obispo '15-'19 University of Arkansas '19 - '21
Year	Venue	Position	Event	Time
Cross Country Championships
2015 Big West Conference Cross Country Championship	Riverside, California	9th	6 km	20:59.9
2016 Big West Conference Cross Country Championship	Kahuku, Hawaii	9th	6 km	22:00.9
2018 Big West Conference Cross Country Championship	Brea, California	3rd	6 km	21:26.7
2018 NCAA Division I cross country championships	Madison, Wisconsin	82nd	6 km	20:58.1
2019 Southeastern Conference Cross Country Championship	Lexington, Kentucky	1st	6 km	19:38.3
2019 NCAA Division I cross country championships	Terre Haute, Indiana	3rd	6 km	19:59.3
Track Championships
2016 Big West Conference Track and Field Championships	California State University, Long Beach	3rd	1500m	4:22.96
2016 Big West Conference Track and Field Championships	California State University, Long Beach	1st	5000m	17:24.91
2016 NCAA Division I Outdoor Track and Field Championships	California State University, Sacramento	52nd	1500m	4:26.16
2019 Big West Conference Track and Field Championships	University of California, Santa Barbara	3rd	5000m	17:12.43
2019 NCAA Division I Outdoor Track and Field Championships	University of Kansas	32nd	5000m	16:08.32
2020 Southeastern Conference Indoor Track and Field Championships	Texas A&M University	1st	3000m	9:09.02
2020 Southeastern Conference Indoor Track and Field Championships	Texas A&M University	1st	5000m	15:48.34
2021 Southeastern Conference Indoor Track and Field Championships	University of Arkansas	2nd	3000m	8:56.55
2021 Southeastern Conference Indoor Track and Field Championships	University of Arkansas	2nd	5000m	15:47.82
2021 NCAA Division I Indoor Track and Field Championships	University of Arkansas	4th	3000m	9:03.85
2021 NCAA Division I Indoor Track and Field Championships	University of Arkansas	9th	5000m	15:58.38
2021 Southeastern Conference Outdoor Track and Field Championships	Texas A&M University	2nd	10,000m	33:17.52
2021 Southeastern Conference Outdoor Track and Field Championships	Texas A&M University	2nd	5000m	15:46.06
2021 NCAA Division I Outdoor Track and Field Championships	University of Oregon	4th	10,000m	32:34.16
2021 NCAA Division I Outdoor Track and Field Championships	University of Oregon	29th	5000m	16:10.46

== Professional career ==
In February 2023, Izzo competed for the United States at the 2023 World Athletics Cross Country Championships in Bathurst, Australia, placing 31st overall. On the road she won her first half-marathon at the Monumental Half in Indianapolis in 2023, and she set personal best times on the track that year in the 1500m, 3000m and 10,000m.

In December 2023, she won the Trofeo Ibercaja Zaragoza Gran Premio de Aragon in Spain, part of the 2023–24 World Athletics Cross Country Tour. Izzo ran for the United States at the 2024 World Athletics Cross Country Championships in Belgrade, Serbia in March 2024 as part of the mixed team relay. In June, she placed 13th at the 2024 US Olympic Trials in the 10,000 metres.

In December 2025, she finished runner-up to Weini Kelati in the 10 km race at the 2025 USA Cross Country Championships to gain automatic selection for the 2026 World Athletics Cross Country Championships in Tallahassee on 10 January 2026, where she placed 24th individually, to help the American team place fourth overall. In April, she finished in 15:33 behind Gela Hambese at the Boston 5K. In May, she won the Delightful Run For Women in Albany, New York. On 23 July 2026, Izzo finished runner-up as Sydney Vaught won the 10,000 metres title at the 2026 USA Outdoor Track and Field Championships.

== Personal life ==
As of 2026, Izzo resides in Flagstaff, Arizona, where she trains with the Golden Peaks Track Club alongside Taryn Parks and Ellie Baker, amongst others, and is sponsored by Adidas.

== Competition record ==
Year	Competition	Venue	Position	Event	Notes
Representing United States
2023	2023 World Athletics Cross Country Championships	Bathurst, New South Wales, Australia	31st	Women's 10km	36:25
2023	2023 World Athletics Cross Country Championships	Bathurst, New South Wales, Australia	5th	Women's Team	103 points
2024	2024 World Athletics Cross Country Championships	Belgrade, Serbia	8th	Mixed 4 × 2000 metres relay	23:21
2026	2026 World Athletics Cross Country Championships	Tallahassee, Florida, United States	24th	Women's 10km	34:25
2026	2026 World Athletics Cross Country Championships	Tallahassee, Florida, United States	4th	Women's Team	83 points
USA Track Championships
2021	United States Olympic Trials	Eugene, Oregon	19th	5000 meters	16:04.35
2022	USA Outdoor Track and Field Championships	Eugene, Oregon	17th	5000 meters	16:13.05
2023	USA Outdoor Track and Field Championships	Eugene, Oregon	15th	5000 meters	15:32.61
2024	USA Olympic Trials	Eugene, Oregon	13th	10,000 meters	32:30.31
2025	USA Outdoor Track and Field Championships	Eugene, Oregon	10th	10,000 meters	33:00.13
2026	USA Outdoor Track and Field Championships	New York City, New York	2nd	10,000 meters	33:36.98
USA Road Running Championships
2021	USATF 5k Road Running Championships; NYRR Abbott Dash to the Finish Line 5K	New York City, NY	11th	5000 meters	16:00
USA Cross Country Championships
2023	USA Cross Country Championships	Richmond, Virginia	6th	10,000 meters	32:40
2024	USA Cross Country Championships	Richmond, Virginia	8th	10,000 meters	34:41.0
2025	USA Cross Country Championships	Portland, Oregon	2nd	10,000 meters	34:00.9
