= Semana Nautica 15K =

Annual road running race in California

The Semana Nautica 15K is held annually on July 4 in Santa Barbara, California and is one of the oldest road races in the country. The 15K is one of the events of the Semana Nautica sports festival, first held in 1933.

The annual 15K race dates back to 1955, initially as a men-only competition. It hosted the American men's national championship race in 1965 and again 1976. A women's section was established in 1971. Former American record holder Gary Tuttle holds the most wins at the competition with six during the period from 1968 to 1982. Three women have won the race on three occasions. Marathon world best holder Jacqueline Hansen had three straight wins from 1973 to 1975. Ruth Vomund (wife of Gary Tuttle) had three wins in the 1990s, and Californian road runner Debra Sharp amassed three victories from 1986 to 1997. Tuttle holds the men's record at 45:14 minutes while Sharp and Linda Somers-Smith share the women's race record with 55 minutes. The 1964 Olympian Ron Larrieu was also among the past winners of the race.
