= 2024 USA Cross Country Championships =

- Venue: Pole Green Park, Richmond, Virginia
- Dates: 20 January 2024

Champions
- Men: Cooper Teare
- Women: Weini Kelati

The 2024 USA Cross Country Championships were the 133rd edition of the USA Cross Country Championships. The races took place at Hanover County, Virginia's Pole Green Park in Richmond, Virginia, on 20 January 2024, and served as the US Trials for the 45th edition of 2024 World Athletics Cross Country Championships (6 member teams), to be held on March 30 in Belgrade, Serbia.

== Results ==
Race results - USATF XC National Championships January 20, 2024 Results by: Blue Ridge Timing

=== Men 10km ===
Position	Athlete	Time
1st place, gold medalist(s)	Cooper Teare	29:06.5
2nd place, silver medalist(s)	Anthony Rotich	29:11.6
3rd place, bronze medalist(s)	Ahmed Muhumed	29:12.6
4	Morgan Pearson	29:15.5
5	Emmanuel Bor	29:26.5
6	Christian Allen	29:27.0
7	Reid Buchanan	29:28.1
8	Anthony Camerieri	29:34.8
9	Andrew Hunter	29:37.2
10	Ryan Ford	29:39.8

=== Women 10km ===
Position	Athlete	Time
1st place, gold medalist(s)	Weini Kelati	32:58.6
2nd place, silver medalist(s)	Emma Hurley	33:35.9
3rd place, bronze medalist(s)	Katie Camarena	33:40.3
4	Allie Ostrander	33:52.5
5	Cailie Logue	33:52.7
6	Abby Nichols	34:09.4
7	Katrina Spratford-Sterling	34:31.7
8	Katie Izzo	34:41.0
9	Kasandra Parker	34:47.1
10	Claire Green	34:59.4

=== U-20 Men 8km ===
Position	Athlete	Time
1st place, gold medalist(s)	Kevin Sanchez	24:06.6
2nd place, silver medalist(s)	Kole Mathison	24:17.9
3rd place, bronze medalist(s)	Noah Breker	24:20.5
4	Aidan Jones	24:22.8
5	Birhanu Harriman	24:24.3
6	Berkley Nance	24:25.2
7	Matthew Donis	24:34.7
8	Aidan Cox	24:36.8
9	Liam Newhart	24:38.5
10	Oliver Burns	24:42.6

=== U-20 Women 6km ===
Position	Athlete	Time
1st place, gold medalist(s)	Zariel Macchia	20:31.0
2nd place, silver medalist(s)	Allie Zealand	20:31.9
3rd place, bronze medalist(s)	Jolena Quarzo	20:44.0
4	Mary Bonner Dalton	20:46.7
5	Maddie Gardiner	20:48.2
6	Ellie Shea	20:53.3
7	Gillian Bushee	21:01.7
8	Julia Kiesler	21:10.2
9	Sadie Adams	21:25.1
10	Temi Ariyo	21:33.2

=== Master's Men 8km ===
Position	Athlete	Time
1st place, gold medalist(s)	Forest Braden	25:34.4
2nd place, silver medalist(s)	Brian Flynn	25:51.3
3rd place, bronze medalist(s)	Adam Orstot	26:18.8
4	Matthew Barresi	26:54.5
5	David Angell	27:04.1
6	Christopher Pirch	27:04.6
7	Charlie Ban	27:09.1
8	Peter Derby	27:09.6
9	William Christian	27:14.1
10	Jeffrey Redfern	27:18.1

=== Master's Women 6km ===
Position	Athlete	Time
1st place, gold medalist(s)	Carrie Dimoff	21:15.5
2nd place, silver medalist(s)	Renee Metivier	21:46.5
3rd place, bronze medalist(s)	April Lund	21:56.9
4	Chelsea Lenge Warren	21:58.7
5	Kasie Enman	22:06.0
6	Mindy Mammen	22:29.3
7	Julia Siegel Breton	23:01.4
8	Kristin Shaw	23:20.2
9	Ashley Palmer-Thomasey	23:20.7
10	Jacqueline Cooke	23:29.0
