= Natosha Rogers =

American long-distance runner

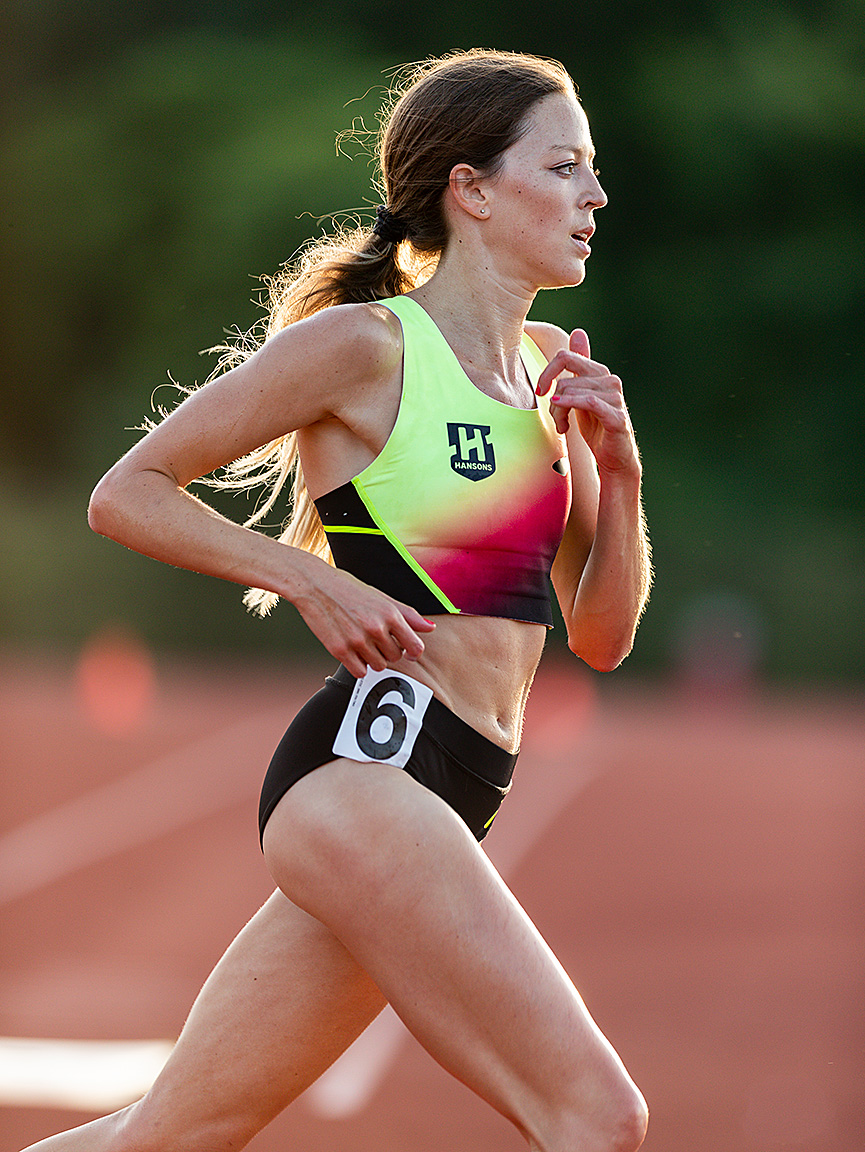
- Rogers in 2020

Personal information
- Nationality: American
- Born: May 7, 1991 (age 35) Littleton, Colorado
- Height: 1.67 m (5 ft 6 in)

Sport
- Country: United States
- Sport: Track, long-distance running
- Event(s): 1500 meters, mile, 5000 meters, 10,000 meters, Half marathon, Marathon
- College team: Texas A&M Aggies
- Team: New Balance; 2014 - 2017; Brooks; 2019 - 2021; Puma Elite; 2022-2024
- Turned pro: 2014
- Coached by: Steve Magness
Medal record
Women's athletics
Representing the United States
NACAC Championships
| Gold medal – first place | 2022 Freeport | 5000 m |

Natosha Rogers (born May 7, 1991, in Littleton, Colorado) is a long-distance runner from the United States. Rogers won the gold medal in the 5000 meters at the 2022 NACAC Championships. She is the 2012 National runner up in the 10,000 meters. Rogers placed 23rd at 2017 IAAF World Cross Country Championships in 34:47.

== Professional ==
=== Track and field Championships ===
| Year | Competition | Venue | Position | Event | Notes |
Representing the United States
| 2022 | 2022 World Athletics Championships | Eugene, Oregon | 15th | 10,000 m | 31:10.57 |
| 2022 | 2022 NACAC Championships | Freeport, Bahamas | 1st | 5000 m | 15:11.68 CR |

| Year | Competition | Venue | Position | Event | Notes |
|---|---|---|---|---|---|
| 2012 | US Olympic Trials | Eugene, Oregon | 2nd | 10,000 m | 31:59.21 |
| 2016 | US Olympic Trials | Eugene, Oregon | 13th | 10,000 m | 33:21.95 |
| 2016 | US Olympic Trials | Eugene, Oregon | 19th | 5000 m | 15:54.27 |
| 2017 | US Outdoor Championships | Sacramento, California | 5th | 10,000 m | 31:54.62 |
| 2017 | US Outdoor Championships | Sacramento, California | 11th | 5000 m | 15:31.46 |
| 2021 | US Olympic Trials | Eugene, Oregon | 7th | 10,000 m | 31:59.09 |
| 2022 | US Outdoor Championships | Eugene, Oregon | 3rd | 10,000 m | 31:29.80 |
| 2023 | US Outdoor Championships | Eugene, Oregon | 3rd | 10,000 m | 32:22.77 |
| 2023 | US Outdoor Championships | Eugene, Oregon | 3rd | 5000 m | 14:55.39 |

Rogers raced The Track Meet 10,000 m and placed 5th in 31:12.28 on 5 December 2020.

=== USA Road Championships ===
Natosha Rogers won 2016 Great Cow Harbor 10 km in Northport, New York in 33:17.2.

| Year | Competition | Venue | Position | Event | Notes |
|---|---|---|---|---|---|
| 2014 | USATF 5 km Championships hosted by CVS Health Downtown 5k | Providence, Rhode Island | 17th | 5 km | 16:18.0 |
| 2016 | USATF 10 Mile Championships hosted by the Medtronic TC 10 Mile | St Paul, Minnesota/Minneapolis, MN | 7th | 10 mile | 54:31 |
| 2017 | USATF Half marathon Championships hosted by the OhioHealth Capital City Half Marathon | Columbus, Ohio | 1st | Half marathon | 70:45 |
| 2017 | USATF 15 km Championships hosted by the Gate River Run | Jacksonville, Florida | 5th | 15 km | 50:01 |
| 2017 | USATF 10 Mile Championships hosted by the Medtronic TC 10 Mile | St Paul, Minnesota/Minneapolis, MN | 2nd | 10 mile | 53:45 |
| 2017 | USATF 5 km Championships hosted by the New York Road Runners; Abbott Dash to the Finish Line 5K | New York, New York | 3rd | 5 km | 15:39 |
| 2019 | USATF 5 km Championships hosted by the New York Road Runners; Abbott Dash to the Finish Line 5K | New York, New York | 20th | 5 km | 16:40 |
| 2020 | USATF 15 km Championships hosted by the Gate River Run | Jacksonville, Florida | 2nd | 15 km | 49:50 |
| 2021 | USATF 10 Mile Championships hosted by the Cherry Blossom Ten Mile Run | Washington, DC | 15th | 10 mile | 55:02 |
| 2021 | USATF 5 km Championships hosted by the New York Road Runners; Abbott Dash to the Finish Line 5K | New York, New York | 4th | 5 km | 15:48 |

Rogers raced Atlanta Track Club half marathon on Atlanta Motor Speedway, finished 2nd behind Molly Seidel in 70:50 on 28 February 2021.

=== Cross Country ===
In 2017, Aliphine Tuliamuk-Bolton won 2017 USA Cross Country Championships title defeating Laura Thweatt, Kellyn Taylor, Courtney Frerichs, Sarah Pagano, and Elaina Balouris. Natosha Rogers placed tenth in Bend, Oregon at 2017 USA Cross Country Championships. Natosha placed 23rd at 2017 IAAF World Cross Country Championships in 34:47 helping Team USA to a 5th-place finish of 17 teams.

| Year | Competition | Venue | Position | Event | Notes |
Representing the United States
| 2017 | 2017 IAAF World Cross Country Championships | Kampala, Uganda | 23rd | 10 km | 34:47 |
| 2017 | 2017 IAAF World Cross Country Championships | Kampala, Uganda | Team USA 5th | 10 km | 90 points |

| Year | Competition | Venue | Position | Event | Notes |
|---|---|---|---|---|---|
| 2017 | USA Cross Country Championships | Bend, Oregon | 10th | 10,000 meters | 36:50.0 |
| 2020 | USA Cross Country Championships | San Diego, California | 1st | 10,000 meters | 35:44.3 |
| 2022 | USA Cross Country Championships | San Diego, California | 6th | 10,000 meters | 35:24 |

== NCAA ==
Rogers won 2012 NCAA 10 km championship in a time of 32:41.63 two days before placing 6th in the 5000 m in 16:20.04 in Des Moines, Iowa.

Natasha Rogers tells her college story on how she overcame injury and focused on what she wanted from her college experience on Off Track: Meeting of the Unknowing Minds podcast on 15 February 2021.

| Year | Competition | Venue | Position | Event | Notes |
|---|---|---|---|---|---|
| Year | College Championship | Venue | Place | Event | Mark |
representing Texas A&M Aggies
| 2012 | 2012 NCAA Division I Outdoor Track and Field Championships | Drake University | 1st | 10,000 metres | 32:41.63 |
| 2012 | 2012 NCAA Division I Outdoor Track and Field Championships | Drake University | 6th | 5000 metres | 16:20.04 |
| 2012 | Big 12 Conference Outdoor Track and Field Championship | Kansas State University | 1st | 10,000 metres | 34:18.66 |
| 2012 | Big 12 Conference Outdoor Track and Field Championship | Kansas State University | 1st | 5000 metres | 15:57.17 |
| 2012 | 2012 NCAA Division I Indoor Track and Field Championships | Boise State University | 7th | 5000 metres | 16:04.06 |
| 2012 | Big 12 Conference Indoor Track and Field Championship | Texas A&M University | 2nd | 5000 metres | 15:52.40 |
| 2012 | Big 12 Conference Indoor Track and Field Championship | Texas A&M University | 2nd | 3000 metres | 9:14.22 |
| 2011 | 2011 NCAA Division I Outdoor Track and Field Championships | University of Oregon | 58th | 5000 metres | 16:55.69 |
| 2011 | Big 12 Conference Outdoor Track and Field Championship | University of Oklahoma | 8th | 5000 metres | 16:33.45 |
| 2011 | Big 12 Conference Indoor Track and Field Championship | University of Nebraska–Lincoln | 22nd | 3000 metres | 9:44.49 |
| 2010 | Big 12 Conference Outdoor Track and Field Championship | University of Missouri | 27th | 5000 metres | 17:33.25 |

== Prep ==
Rogers is a Dakota Ridge High School 2009 alumnus.
In 2009, Rogers placed 3rd twice, setting personal bests in 5:03.10 (1600m) and 10:50.60 (3200m) on May 16 at Colorado All-Classification State Meet.

Rogers placed top 11 at Colorado High School Activities Association 5A State Cross Country Championships all four years of high school.
