= William Kramer (runner) =

American long-distance runner

Personal information
- Full name: William Jacob Kramer
- Born: January 23, 1884 Melville, Suffolk, New York, United States
- Died: February 29, 1964 (aged 80) New York, New York, United States

Sport
- Sport: Long-distance running
- Event: 10,000 metres

William Jacob Kramer (January 23, 1884 – February 29, 1964), also known as Willie Kramer, was an American long-distance runner. He competed in the men's 10,000 metres at the 1912 Summer Olympics.

Kramer's first major victory was at the 1909 USA Cross Country Championships. He won one USA Outdoor Track and Field Championships title in the 5-mile in 1910, and he then went on to repeat as cross country champion in 1911 and 1912. At the 1913 USA Indoor Track and Field Championships, Kramer won the two miles in a time of 9:19 1/5.

In his personal life, Kramer was a plumber. He was later a part owner of Long Island Machine and Pattern Works in Dumbo, Brooklyn.
