= 1913 USA Indoor Track and Field Championships =

National athletics championship event

- Dates: March 6
- Host city: New York City, New York, United States
- Venue: 22nd Regiment Armory
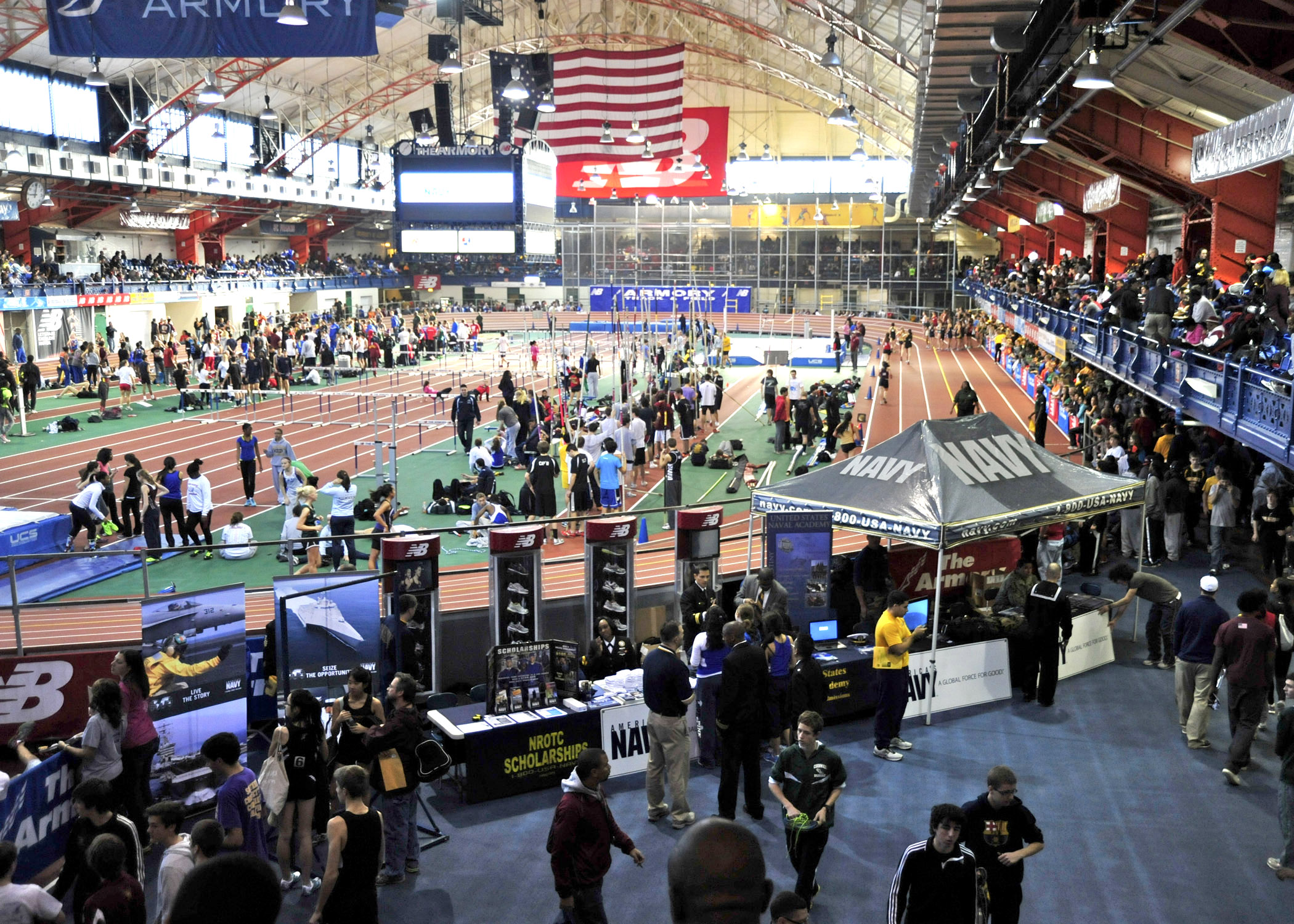
- Level: Senior
- Type: Indoor
- Events: 14

The 1913 USA Indoor Track and Field Championships were organized by the Amateur Athletic Union (AAU) and served as the national championships in indoor track and field for the United States.

The men's championships were held at the 22nd Regiment Armory in New York City, New York, and they took place March 6. Women's championships were not officially held until 1927.

At the championships, Abel Kiviat won the 1000 yards in an American record, and then also won the 600 yards. The 2 miles walk was introduced for the first time.

== Medal summary ==
=== Men ===
Event	Gold		Silver	Bronze
75 yards	Howard Drew	7.8		
300 yards	Fred Burns	33.2		
600 yards	Abel Kiviat	1:15.2		
1000 yards	Abel Kiviat	2:15.8		
2 miles	William Kramer	9:19.2		
70 yards hurdles	James Wendell	9.4		
High jump	John Johnstone	1.85 m		
Standing high jump	Platt Adams	5 ft 2 in (1.57 m)		
Standing long jump	Platt Adams	3.27 m		
Triple jump	Dan Ahearn	14.29 m		
Pole vault for distance	Platt Adams	27 ft 9 1/2 in (8.47 m)		
Shot put (Note: Implement was 24 pounds (11 kg))	Pat McDonald	39 ft 3 1/4 in (11.96 m)		
Weight throw for height	Pat McDonald	15 ft 7 in (4.74 m)		
2 miles walk	Dick Gifford	14:32.6		
