= Bill Ashenfelter =

American track and field athlete

William Nyman Ashenfelter (October 16, 1924, in Collegeville, Pennsylvania – June 4, 2010) was an American track and field athlete known for long-distance events. He was the younger brother of Horace Ashenfelter. In the Steeplechase at the 1952 Olympic Trials, both brothers ran together, with Horace edging ahead to take the win in the last lap. Both brothers broke the American record that had been held for 16 years by Harold Manning and both brothers qualified to run in the 1952 Olympics. While Bill was unable to finish his trial heat, Horace went on to win the gold medal in world record time. But Bill was not left out of making the world record book. A month earlier, Bill joined Reggie Pearman, John Barnes, and Mal Whitfield to set the world record in the 4 × 800 metres relay at 7:29.2.

Bill was the 1954 American champion in the 2 mile steeplechase. In 1951 he won the USA Cross Country Championships. Horace won the championships in 1954–5, completing the only set of brothers to win the championships.
