= Horace Ashenfelter =

American athlete (1923–2018)

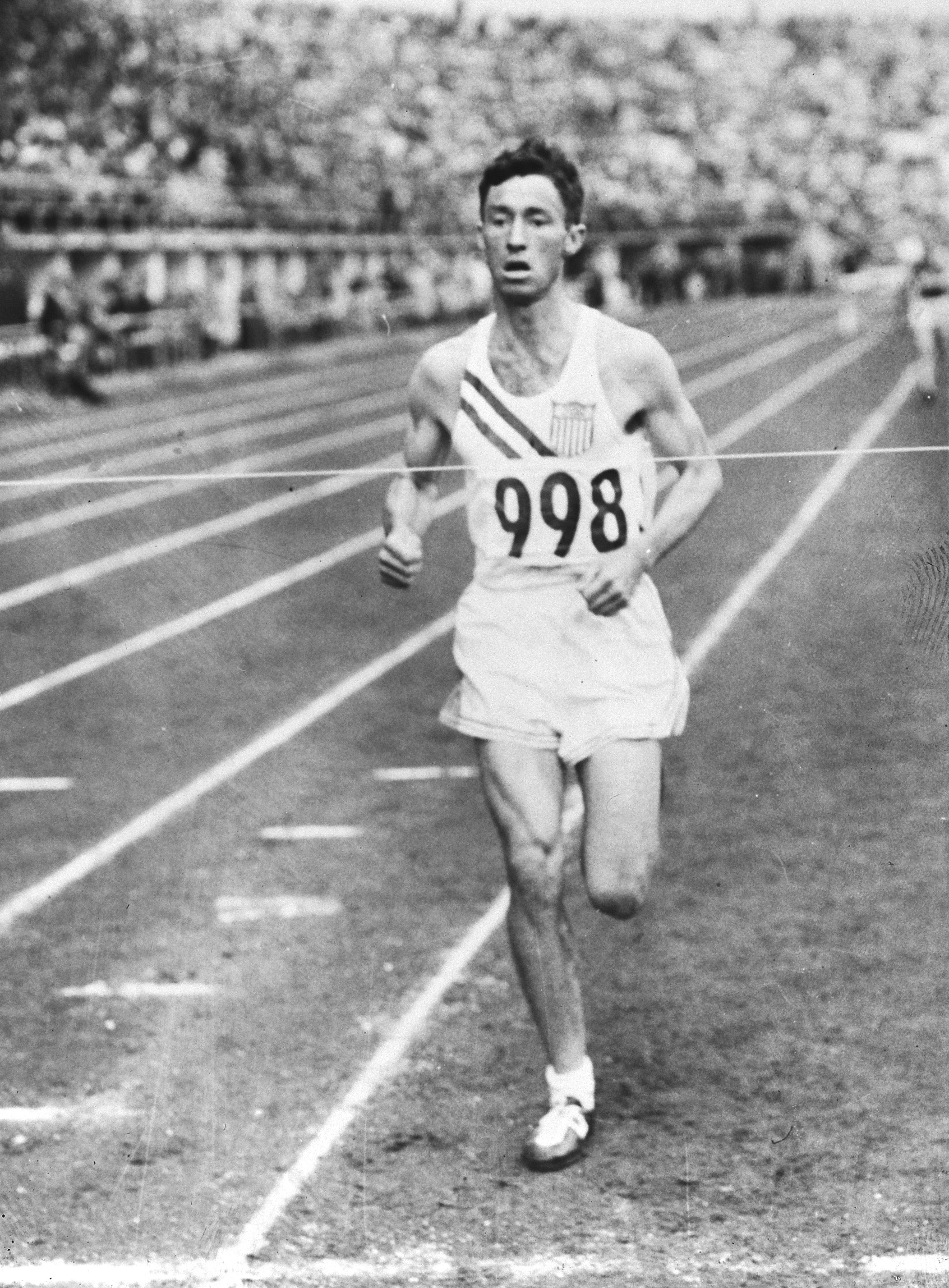

Personal information
- Full name: Horace Ashenfelter, III
- Born: January 23, 1923 Collegeville, Pennsylvania, U.S.
- Died: January 6, 2018 (aged 94) West Orange, New Jersey, U.S.
Medal record
Men's athletics
Representing the United States
Olympic Games
Gold medal – first place	1952 Helsinki	3000 m st.
Pan American Games
Silver medal – second place	1955 Mexico City	5000 metres

Horace Ashenfelter III (January 23, 1923 – January 6, 2018) was an American athlete. He competed in international athletics from 1947 to 1956. He won fifteen AAU nationals titles and three collegiate national titles during his career.

== Biography ==
Ashenfelter was born in Collegeville, Pennsylvania, and attended Collegeville High School. He completed his degree at Penn State, where he was a member of Delta Upsilon fraternity, and served in the United States Army Air Forces as a pilot and gunnery instructor during World War II.

Although he was considered a long shot, Ashenfelter was the surprise winner of the steeplechase at the 1952 Summer Olympics in Helsinki with a dramatic surge on the last lap following the final water jump after trailing substantially early in the race. In what was considered an early athletic Cold War battle, he finished ahead of Vladimir Kazantsev of the USSR and John Disley of Great Britain. In the process, he broke Kazantsev's unofficial world record (the IAAF did not accept official records in the steeplechase until 1954). Since Ashenfelter worked for the Federal Bureau of Investigation, it led to humorous comments about him being the first American spy who allowed himself to be chased by a Russian KGB agent (Kazantsev was a KGB officer). In addition, Ashenfelter won the Sullivan Award as the outstanding amateur athlete in 1952.

Ashenfelter won the Millrose Games two-mile run from 1952 to 1955 and again in 1957. His best winning time was in 1954 at 8:53.3. He won the USA Cross Country Championships back-to-back in 1954–1955, three years after his Olympian younger brother Bill Ashenfelter had won the same championship, the only set of brothers to both win the event.

He was inducted into the National Track and Field Hall of Fame in 1975, the Millrose Games Hall of Fame in 2001 as a five-time champion and the National Distance Running Hall of Fame in 2012. He was inducted into the Sports Hall of Fame of New Jersey in 1998.

== Personal life ==
Ashenfelter lived in Glen Ridge, New Jersey, where the Ashenfelter 8k Classic is held annually in his honor. The indoor track facility at his alma mater, Penn State, is named in his honor.

Ashenfelter died at a nursing home in West Orange, New Jersey, on January 6, 2018, 17 days before his 95th birthday.

== See also ==
- List of Pennsylvania State University Olympians
