= Sarah Pagano =

American long-distance runner

Sarah Buchanan
Personal information
- Full name: Sarah Pagano Buchanan
- Nationality: American
- Born: July 23, 1991 (age 34) Ringwood, New Jersey
- Height: 1.65 m (5 ft 5 in)

Sport
- Sport: Track, cross country, Long-distance running
- Event(s): mile, 5000 meters, 10,000 meters, Cross Country, Half marathon
- College team: Syracuse
- Club: Adidas
- Turned pro: 2014

Achievements and titles
- Personal best(s): Half marathon: 1:12:27; 1500 m:4:18.94 Mile: 4:40.28; 5000m: 15:11.27; 10,000m: 31:51.66
- Updated on August 4, 2019

Sarah Pagano Buchanan (née Pagano; born July 23, 1991) is an American long-distance runner. She is referred to as "Spags" by friends and teammates.

Pagano began running competitively at Immaculate Heart Academy, where she won multiple state titles in both indoor and outdoor competition.

== Professional ==
Pagano competed for Team USA at IAAF World Cross Country Championships in Kampala, Uganda. At the 2017 IAAF World Cross Country Championships, she competed at 2017 IAAF World Cross Country Championships to 30th place in 35:18 and 2018 NACAC Championships 4th place over 10,000 meters.

Sarah Pagano represented Team USA for the 7th time at 2019 Pan American Games.

Year	Competition	Venue	Position	Event	Notes
Representing the United States
2023	2023 World Athletics Road Running Championships	Riga, Latvia	28th	Half Marathon	1:11:37
2023	Nagoya Women's Marathon	Nagoya, Japan	17th	Marathon	2:32:05
2019	2019 Pan American Games	Lima, Peru	6th	10,000 m	32:48.04
2019	2019 IAAF World Cross Country Championships	Aarhus, Denmark	50th	10 km	39:54
2019	2019 IAAF World Cross Country Championships	Aarhus, Denmark	Team USA 8th	10 km	190 points
2018	2018 NACAC Championships	Toronto, Canada	4th	10 km	33:33.35
2017	2017 IAAF World Cross Country Championships	Kampala, Uganda	30th	10 km	35:18
2017	2017 IAAF World Cross Country Championships	Kampala, Uganda	Team USA 5th	10 km	90 points
2017	Great Edinburgh Cross Country	Edinburgh, Scotland	9th	6 km	21:25
2017	Great Edinburgh Cross Country	Edinburgh, Scotland	Team USA 3rd	6 km	72 points
2016	Great Edinburgh Cross Country	Edinburgh, Scotland	19th	6 km	22:17
2016	Great Edinburgh Cross Country	Edinburgh, Scotland	Team USA 3rd	6 km	100 points
2014	Chiba Ekiden Road Race 5000m	Chiba, Japan	4th	5 km	16:21.13

Year	Competition	Venue	Position	Event	Notes
USATF Championships
2021	United States Olympic Trials	Eugene, Oregon	33rd	10,000 m	33:39.98
2019	2019 Toyota USA Outdoor Track and Field Championships	Des Moines, Iowa	6th	10,000 m	32:48.58
2019	2019 USA Cross Country Championships	Tallahassee, Florida	10th	10 km	33:44
2018	US 10km road Championships; AJC Peachtree Road Race	Atlanta, Georgia	8th	10 km	33:31
2018	US Outdoor Championships	Des Moines, Iowa	5th	10,000 m	32:13.21
2017	USATF National Club Cross Country Championships	Lexington, Kentucky	1st	6000 m	19:40
2017	US 10km road Championships; AJC Peachtree Road Race	Atlanta, Georgia	2nd	10,000 m	33:01
2017	US Outdoor Championships	Sacramento, California	8th	5,000 m	15:26.04
2017	US Cross Country Championships	Bend, Oregon	5th	10 km	35:44
2016	USA 10K Road Championships; Tufts Health Plan 10K for Women	Boston, Massachusetts	2nd	10 km	32:31
2016	US Olympic Trials	Eugene, Oregon	17th	10,000 m	34:14.04
2016	US Olympic Trials	Eugene, Oregon	21st	5000 m	16:06.42
2016	USA 15K Road Championships; Gate River Run	Jacksonville, Florida	5th	15 km	52:04
2015	USATF National Club Cross Country Championships	San Francisco, California	6th	6 km	20:04
2015	US 12km road Championships.US 12K National Championships	Alexandria, Virginia	7th	12 km	39:33
2015	US 5km road Championships; CVS Downtown 5K	Providence, Rhode Island	9th	5 km	16:15
2015	2015 USA Outdoor Track and Field Championships	Eugene, Oregon	17th	10,000 m	34:30.72
2014	US 12km road Championships.US 12K National Championships	Alexandria, Virginia	18th	12 km	40:48
2014	US 10km road Championships; Tufts 10K for Women	Boston, Massachusetts	18th	10 km	33:05
2014	US 5km road Championships; CVS Downtown 5K	Providence, Rhode Island	10th	5 km	16:05

== NCAA ==
Representing Syracuse University
Year	ACC Cross Country	NCAA Cross Country	ACC Indoor	ECAC Indoor	ACC Outdoor	NCAA Outdoor
2013-14			5,000 m 16:14.81 4th 3,000 m 9:29.42 5th		10,000 m 33:42.14 6th	10,000 m 33:00.46 7th
Year	Big East Cross Country	NCAA Cross Country	Big East Indoor	ECAC Indoor	Big East Outdoor	NCAA Outdoor
2012-13	6 km 21:10.4 9th	6km 20:29.3 63rd	3,000 m 9:42.16 10th 5,000 m 16:30.17 5th	5,000 m 16:31.95 2nd	10,000 m 34:33.05 3rd 5,000 m 16:46.58 7th	
2011-12					10,000 m 34:37.94 1st	10,000 m 34:54.22 22nd
2010-11			5,000 m 16:40.39 9th		10,000 m 34:20.73 6th	
2009-10			DMR 11:52.13 8th	3,000 m 10:14.71 23rd		

== High school ==
A resident of Ringwood, New Jersey who attended Immaculate Heart Academy, Sarah Pagano earned all-county honors in 2009.

Pagano won the NJSIAA State Girls Cross Country Championships Non Public A Group in 2007 in 19:20 and 2008 in 19:11, respectively.

Pagano won 2008 New Jersey Non Public A 1600 and 3200 meters races.
