= Ron Larrieu =

American long-distance runner (1937–2020)

Personal information
- Full name: Gilbert Ronald Larrieu
- Nationality: American
- Born: May 23, 1937 San Francisco, California, U.S.
- Died: June 1, 2020 (aged 83)

Sport
- Sport: Long-distance running
- Event: 10,000 metres

Gilbert Ronald Larrieu (May 23, 1937 – June 1, 2020), known as Ron Larrieu, was an American long-distance runner. He competed in the men's 10,000 metres at the 1964 Summer Olympics. He was the older brother of American five-time Olympian Francie Larrieu.

Ron ran for Palo Alto High School, winning the 1956 CIF California State Meet in the mile in 4:20.1. He was ranked #3 in the country that year. Earlier in the season he broke the 2 mile high school record that had stood for 31 years. Collegiately he ran for Cal Poly Pomona.

He was a two time national champion in cross country, in 1965 and 1966.
