= Polo Fields =

Multi-purpose stadium in San Francisco, California

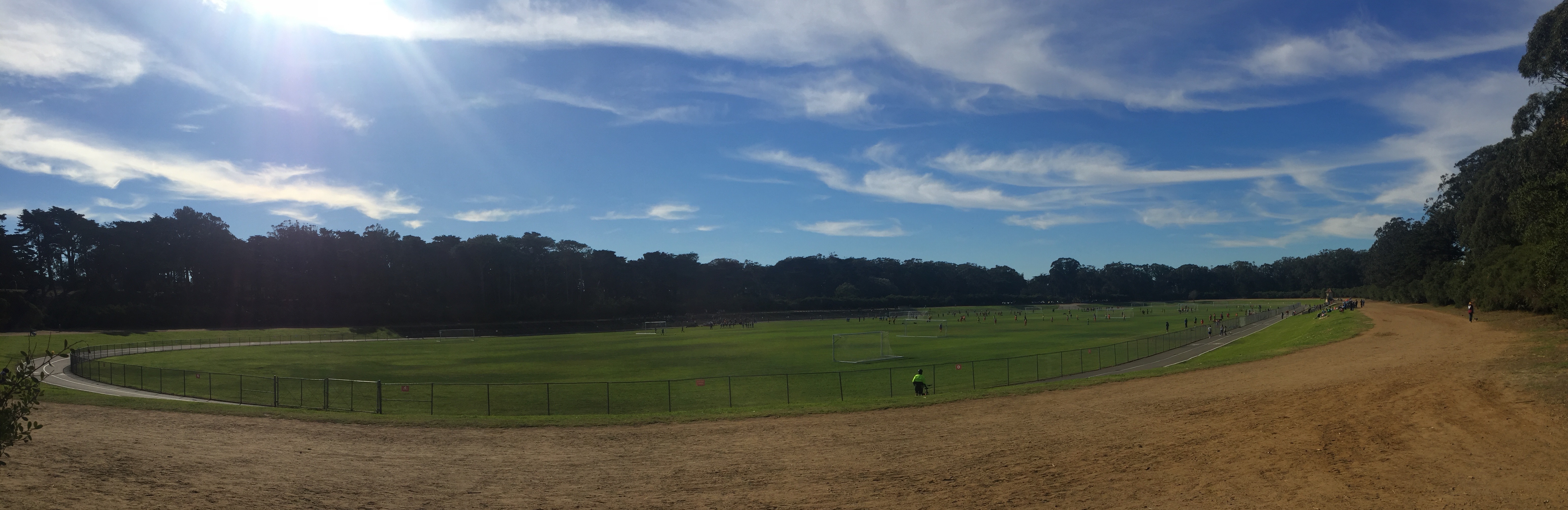
- Interactive map of Polo Fields
- Former names: Golden Gate Park Stadium (1906-36)
- Address: 1232 John F. Kennedy Dr; San Francisco, CA 94121
- Location: Golden Gate Park
- Owner: City and County of San Francisco
- Operator: San Francisco Recreation & Parks Department
- Capacity: 57,000

Construction
- Groundbreaking: January 6, 1905
- Opened: July 4, 1906
- Cost: $50,000 ($1.79 million in 2025 dollars)
- Architect: Reid & Reid

The Polo Field is a large multi-purpose stadium and sporting field located on the West Side of San Francisco in Golden Gate Park. Despite its name, polo is rarely played on the Polo Field. The facility has a multitude of uses. There are six regulation soccer pitches on the grass field, surrounded by a .67-mile cycle track. Wooden bleachers flank the north and south sides of the cycle track surrounding the field. Surrounding the grass field, cycle track, and bleachers is a 0.75-mile (1,210 m) dirt track used for running and horse riding.

== History ==
The Polo Field has been the site of diverse events over the years. The Polo Field was originally called the Golden Gate Park Stadium and opened in 1906 as a velodrome. Cyclists from all over the West Coast have used the track for over a century. In 1967, the Human Be-In counterculture music concert was held on the Polo Field. The Polo Field was also the home field for San Francisco-based rugby clubs in the Northern California Rugby Football Union from the 1960s through the early 1990s. It was the site of the Golden Gate Rugby Tournament, held in April, during this time.

== Tenants ==
Cycling, soccer, cross country running and ultimate frisbee events are frequently held on the Polo Field all year long. The annual Outside Lands Music and Arts Festival is held on the Polo Field each August. From 1986 to 2009, the annual Bay to Breakers footrace held its post-race event, Footstock, at the Polo Field each May.

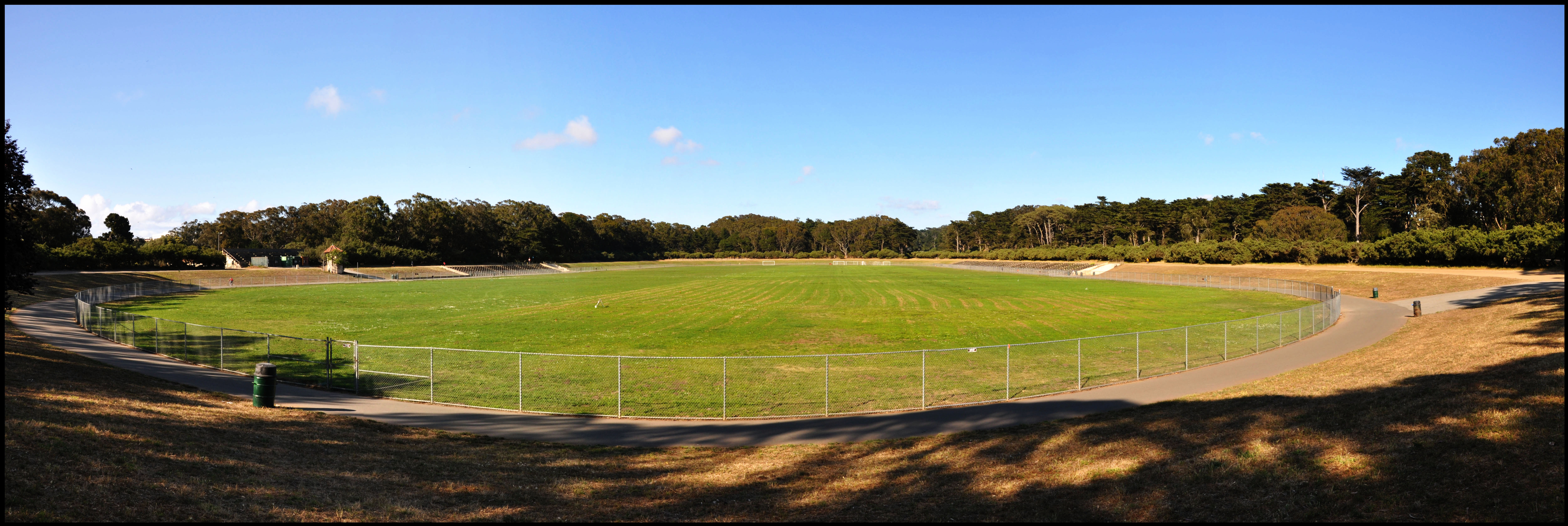

== Cycling track ==
The historic cycling track at the Polo Field was a 1 kilometer long paved track used by cyclists for training and events. The cycling track was a centerpoint of bicycle racing from the 1930s through the 1950s.

The local group Friends of the Polo Field was recently formed to restore the cycling track to the original condition when it was created.

== Naming ==
The facility is referred to by both the singular "Polo Field" and the plural "Polo Fields." While both are in common use, they often distinguish between official and descriptive contexts.

=== Official and Historical Names ===
Technically, the primary official name used by the San Francisco Recreation and Parks Department is the Polo Field (singular). When it first opened on July 4, 1906, it was known as the Golden Gate Park Stadium. It was officially designated as a municipal polo field in 1931, after which the name "Polo Field" became its standard identifier.

Signage at the entrance of the Polo Field identifies the facility as "Polo Field and Stadium".

=== Plural Usage ===
The plural Polo Fields became a common vernacular term following the construction of Kezar Stadium in the late 1920s. To distinguish between the park's two major stadiums, locals began referring to the older western stadium by the plural "Polo Fields."

In contemporary use, the plural form is often preferred for its functional accuracy; the central grass area is currently partitioned into multiple distinct playing surfaces, including six regulation soccer pitches. Consequently, locals often refer to it in the plural form, while government and mapping services retains the singular form.

== See also ==
- Hardly Strictly Bluegrass
- San Francisco Soccer Football League
