= Laura Thweatt =

American long-distance runner

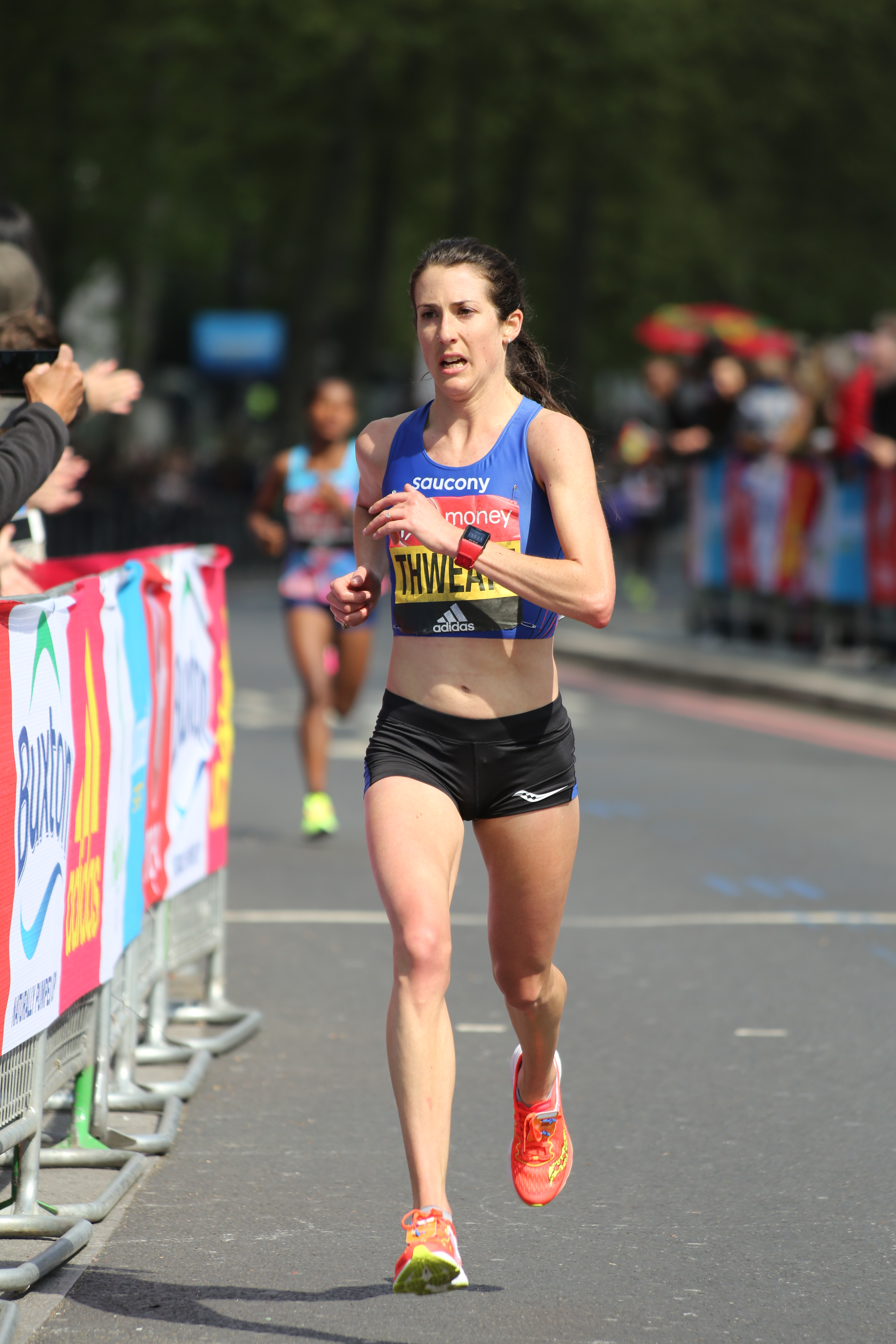
- Thweatt at the 2017 London Marathon

Personal information
- Nationality: American
- Born: December 17, 1988 (age 37) Durango, Colorado
- Height: 5 ft 6 in (1.68 m)

Sport
- Sport: Track, Long-distance running
- Events: 5000 m, 10,000 m, Marathon
- College team: University of Colorado, Boulder
- Team: Saucony
- Coached by: Joe Bosshard

Achievements and titles
- Personal bests: 1500 meters: 4:10.55 3000 meters: 8:57.11; 2-mile: 9:44.46; 5000 meters: 15:04.98; 10,000 meters: 31:52.94; Half marathon: 1:10:12 Marathon: 2:25:38

Laura Thweatt (born December 17, 1988) is an American long-distance runner.

== Early life, family and education ==
Thweatt was born in Durango, Colorado. She began running competitively at Durango High School for which she placed 2nd at the 2006 Colorado 5A cross country state championship.

She attended the University of Colorado.

== College athletic career ==
Thweatt competed for the University of Colorado where she was a five time All-Big 12 Conference performer and Academic All-Big 12. She was coached by Mark Wetmore. Her teammates included future Olympic medalists Jenny Simpson and Emma Coburn, Olympic steeplechaser Billy Nelson, Brent and Sara Vaughn, and Bradley Harkrader.

== Professional athletic career ==
=== Track and Field ===
Thweatt ran the 2016 Olympic standard in the 10,000 meters with a time of 31:52.94 at the 2016 Stanford Invitational.

==== USA National Championships ====
Year	Competition	Venue	Position	Event	Notes
2013	USA Outdoor Track and Field Championships	Des Moines, Iowa	14th	5000 m	16:12.94
2014	USA Indoor Track and Field Championships	Albuquerque, New Mexico	6th	3000 m	9:30.52
2016	USA Olympic Trials & Outdoor Track and Field Championships	Eugene, Oregon	5th	10,000 m	32:26.21
2016	USA Olympic Trials & Outdoor Track and Field Championships	Eugene, Oregon	18th	5,000 m	15:50.60
2020	USA Olympic Trials & Outdoor Track and Field Championships	Atlanta, Georgia	5th	Marathon	2:29:08

=== Cross Country ===
Thweatt won the title at the 2013 and 2014 USATF National Club Cross Country Championships.

In 2015, Thweatt won the USA Cross Country Championships. She also competed in the 2015 IAAF World Cross Country Championships where she finished 29th.

Year	Competition	Venue	Position	Event	Notes
2013	USA Cross Country Championships	St. Louis, Missouri	14th	8000 meters	27:30
2015	USA Cross Country Championships	Boulder, Colorado	1st	8000 meters	27:42
2017	USA Cross Country Championships	Bend, Oregon	2nd	10,000 meters	35:11.7

=== Road ===
Thweatt finished 3rd in the 2013 US National Road Racing Championships in 39:15 (5:16 per mile) over 12 km.

Thweatt finished 2nd in 2015 Jacksonville Gate River Run 15 km USATF Road Championships in 50:50. She won 2015 Rock 'n' Roll Virginia Beach Half Marathon and debut at 2015 TCS New York City Marathon 7th place in 2:28:23.

At 2016 USATF 5 km Championships hosted by CVS Downtown 5K in Providence Rhode Island, Thweatt finished 6th in 16:07.

Thweatt finished 6th in 2017 London Marathon in 2:25:38 (5:34 per mile) over 42.2 km.

In 2019, she finished 5th in the 2019 NYRR New York Mini 10K, which also served as the USATF Women's 10K Championship. Thweatt placed 8th at 2019 Chicago Marathon in 2:29:06.

She trained under coach Joe Bosshard for the 2020 Olympics but missed a place on the U.S. Olympic Team by 16 seconds when Thweatt placed 5th at Atlanta hosted United States Olympic Marathon Trials in February 2020.

Thweatt placed 8th in 2:27:00 at 2021 New York marathon.

== Personal life ==
Thweatt has resided in Superior, Colorado, and Louisville, Colorado.
