= Carrie Ellwood =

American long-distance runner

Personal information
- Born: Carrie Verdon; 8 March 1994 (age 32)

Sport
- Sport: Athletics
- Events: Long distance running, Cross country running

Carrie Ellwood (née Verdon born 8 March 1994) is an American long-distance and cross country runner. She won the USA Cross Country Championships in January 2025. That year, she set the American road national record over 25 km.

== Biography ==
Born Carrie Verdon, she was educated at Campolindo High School in Moraga, California, and competed for the University of Colorado between 2013 and 2017. She placed 20th and was the top American finisher at the 2013 World U20 Cross-Country Championships in Poland.

In March 2020, she was runner-up to Geneviève Lalonde at the 2020 Pan American Cross Country Cup in Victoria, British Columbia. She placed seventh in the 2021 Chicago Marathon and second in the Pittsburgh Half Marathon in 1:10:47 in 2023.

On 11 January 2025, Ellwood won the USA Cross Country Championships over 10 km in Lubbock, Texas, running the course in 34:22 to secure the win by a margin of 23 seconds.

In March 2025, she had a top-ten finish at the USA half marathon championships in Atlanta, Georgia. In May 2025, competing on the roads in Grand Rapids, Michigan, Ellwood won the USATF 25 km Championships title and set a new American record for the distance, winning in 1:22:27 to better the American record set by Betsy Saina on the same the previous year. In September 2025, she placed fifth at the USATF 20k Championships in New Haven, Connecticut to move to second behind Taylor Roe on the USATF Road Running Circuit standings. In November 2025, Ellwood ran 68:34 to win the Monumental Half Marathon in Indianapolis.

On 1 March 2026, Ellwood placed second in 1:09:47 behind Molly Born at the USA Half Marathon Championships in Atlanta, Georgia, in a controversial race in which she was one of a number of athletes directed to the wrong section of the course as they followed the lead vehicle and a motorcycle with a television camera operator. She was subsequently included as part of the United States team for the World Road Running Championships in Copenhagen, Denmark.

In November 2026, Ellwood ran 2:26:28 at the New York City Marathon to place sixth overall and second among Americans behind Jessica McClain.

== Personal life ==
After graduating from the University of Colorado, she stepped away from athletics for a time, and worked as a teacher, later joining the elite ranks with Team Boulder in Boulder, Colorado.
