= Florida State Seminoles cross country =

- Founded: 1962; 64 years ago
- University: Florida State University
- Conference: ACC
- Location: Tallahassee, Florida, US
- Course: Apalachee Regional Park
- Nickname: Florida State Seminoles
- Colors: Garnet and gold

Men's NCAA appearances
- 1981, 2001, 2002, 2003, 2004, 2005, 2006, 2007, 2008, 2009, 2010, 2011, 2012, 2013, 2014, 2015, 2018

Women's NCAA appearances
- 1977 (AIAW), 1978 (AIAW), 1979 (AIAW), 1980 (AIAW), 1981 (AIAW), 2001, 2002, 2003, 2004, 2005, 2006, 2007, 2008, 2009, 2010, 2011, 2012, 2013, 2014, 2015, 2018

Men's conference champions
- Metro: 1978, 1979, 1982; ACC: 2010

Women's conference champions
- ACC: 2007, 2008, 2009, 2010, 2011, 2012, 2013

The Florida State Seminoles cross country program represents Florida State University (variously Florida State or FSU) in the sport of cross country running. The program includes separate men's and women's cross country teams, both of which compete in National Collegiate Athletic Association (NCAA) Division I and the Atlantic Coast Conference (ACC). The men's cross country team officially started in 1962; the women's team began in 1968.

The men's team has had eight All-Americans and finished as NCAA runner-up in 2010 while the women's team has had thirteen All-Americans and finished as NCAA runner-up in 2009 and 2010.

== See also ==
- Florida State Seminoles
- Florida State Seminoles track and field
- History of Florida State University
- List of Florida State University professional athletes
