= Dillon Maggard =

American runner

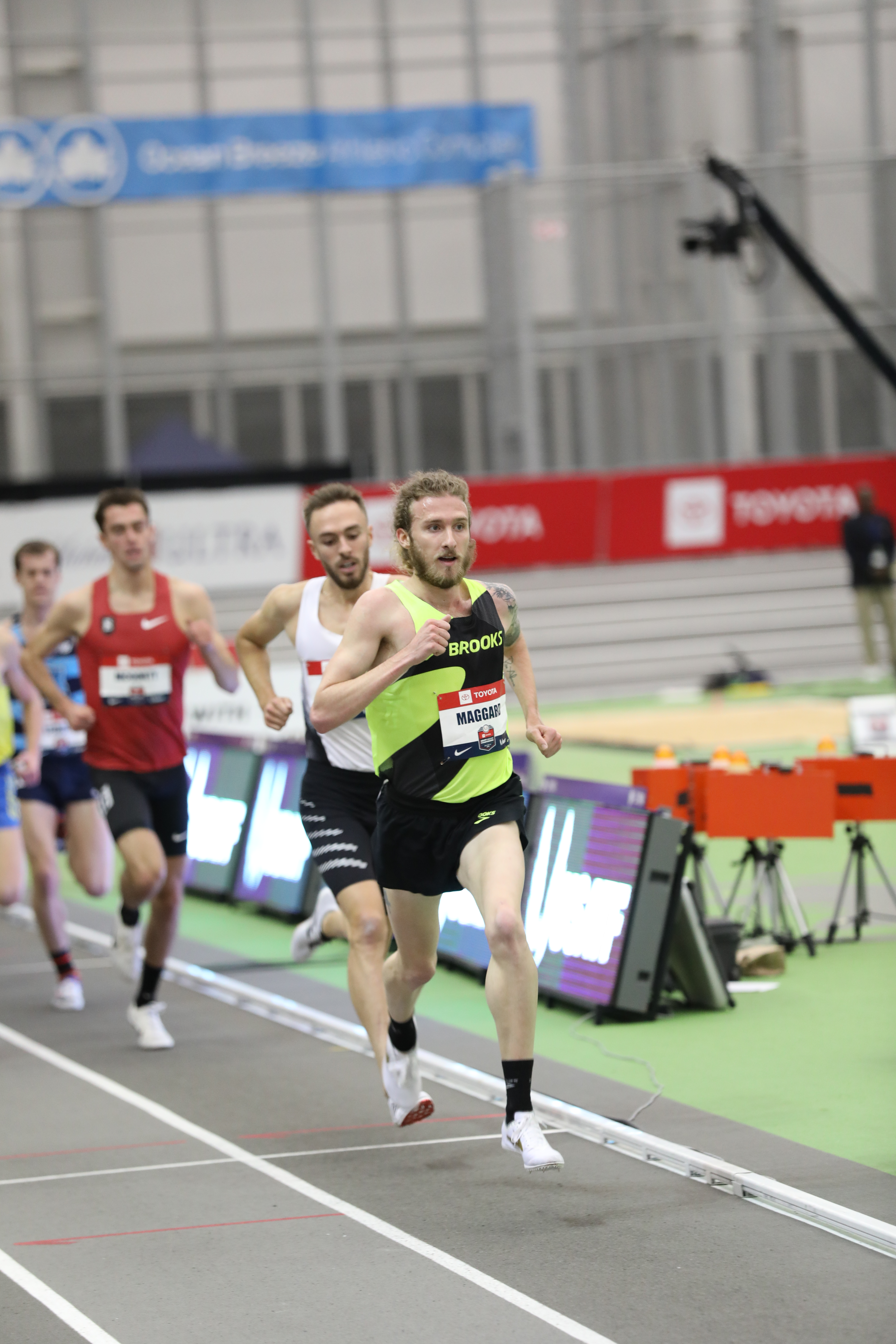
- Maggard at the 2019 USA Indoor Track and Field Championships

Personal information
- Born: October 16, 1995 (age 31)
- Home town: Kirkland, Washington, U.S.
- Education: Lake Washington High School

Sport
- Sport: Athletics
- Events: 1500 m, 3000 m, 5000 m, 10,000 m
- College team: Utah State Aggies
- Club: Brooks Beasts

Achievements and titles
- Personal bests: 1500 m: 3:36.18 (Los Angeles 2023); 3000 m: 7:46.18 (Belgrade 2022); 5000 m: 13:13.62 (Boston 2022); 10,000 m: 27:37.26 (Palo Alto 2022)
Medal record
Men's track and field
Representing United States
NACAC Championships in Athletics
Silver medal – second place	2022 Freeport	10,000 m

Dillon Maggard (born October 16, 1995) is an American middle and long-distance runner. He competed collegiately for the Utah State Aggies, where he was a nine-time All American. He now works as an assistant coach for the team. He competed in the 3000 metres at the 2022 World Athletics Indoor Championships, where he placed 9th in the final.

== Personal bests ==
Outdoor

- 800 metres – 1:51.21 (Boise 2016)
- 1500 metres – 3:36.18 (Los Angeles 2019)
- Mile – 3:55.51 (Falmouth, MA 2023)
- 5000 metres – 13:16.55 (Los Angeles 2023)
- 10,000 metres – 27:37.26 (Palo Alto 2023)

Indoor

- 800 metres – 1:52.33 (Boise 2018)
- Mile – 4:01.25 (College Station 2019)
- 3000 metres – 7:46.18 (Beograd 2022)
- Two miles – 8:33.28 (New York 2019)
- 5000 metres – 13:13.62 (Boston 2022)
