= Anthony Rotich =

Kenyan-born American long-distance runner

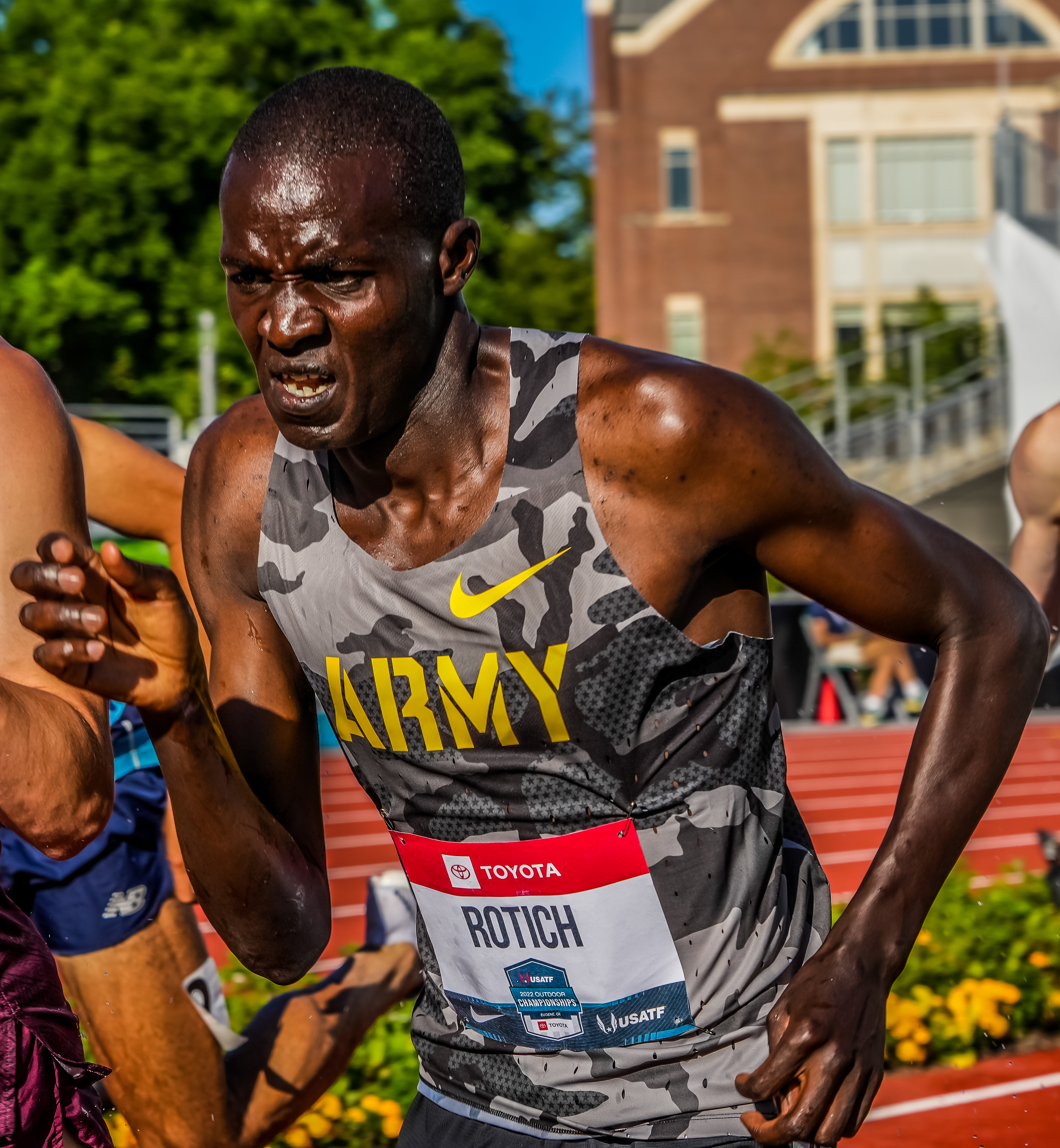
- Rotich at the 2022 USA Outdoor Track and Field Championships

Personal information
- Nationality: American
- Born: August 9, 1991 (age 34) Nairobi, Kenya

Sport
- Sport: Track
- Events: 1500 meters, mile, 3000-m steeple, 5000 meters
- College team: UTEP
- Turned pro: 2016

Achievements and titles
- Personal bests: 1500 meters: 3:42.55; Mile: 3:59.93; 5000 meters: 13:31.59; 3000 m SC: 8:13.74

Anthony Rotich (born August 9, 1991) is an American long-distance runner who specializes in the 3000 metres steeplechase. He is a four time NCAA Division I Champion and twelve time NCAA Division I All-American.

== Running career ==
=== Collegiate ===
From Koiwa High School, Rotich was a state champion in high school. He was recruited to UTEP from El Paso, Texas, whose track and cross country program had a long history in recruiting talented runners from eastern Africa. At UTEP, Rotich was a 3 time NCAA champion in the 3000 meters steeplechase. In 2014, he won the mile at the indoor NCAAs and won the 3000-meter steeplechase at the 2014 NCAA Division I Outdoor Track and Field Championships.

In 2015, Rotich was named Conference USA track and field athlete of the year. By the time he graduated in 2015, Rotich's was awarded twelve All-American honors in NCAA track and cross country, with a total of 11 national awards.

== Career finishes and statistics ==
| College | CUSA Cross Country | NCAA Cross Country | Indoor CUSA | NCAA Indoor | Outdoor CUSA | NCAA Outdoor |
|---|---|---|---|---|---|---|
| Freshman 11-12 | | | DMR 4th; 3000 5th; 5000 2nd | | 3000S 2nd; 5000 3rd | 3000S 6th |
| Sophomore 12-13 | 8k 1st | 10 km 4th | DMR 2nd; Mile 2nd; 3000 1st; 5000 1st | 3000 12th; 5000 6th | 1500 1st; 3000S 1st; 5000 1st | 3000S 1st |
| Junior 13-14 | 8k 1st | 10 km 19th | Mile 1st; 3000 1st; 5000 1st | Mile 1st | 1500 1st; 3000S 1st; 5000 1st | 3000S 1st |
| Senior 14-15 | 8k 1st | 10 km 11th | Mile 2nd; 3000 2nd; 5000 1st | Mile 3rd | 1500 1st; 3000S 1st; 5000 1st | 3000S 1st |
| R Senior 15-16 | 8K 1st | 10 km 15th | | | | |

=== College times ===
| Event | Time | Date | Venue |
|---|---|---|---|
| 1500m | 3:42.55 | April 12, 2014 | El Paso, Texas |
| Mile | 3:59.93 | April 25, 2015 | Berkeley, California |
| 3000m | 7:53.43 | February 9, 2013 | Seattle, Washington |
| 5000m | 13:31.59 | April 3, 2015 | Stanford, California |
| 3000mSC | 8:30.54 | May 4, 2014 | Stanford, California |

== National and international career ==
2015 All-Athletics.com World Rankings

| Event Group | Place | Score |
|---|---|---|
| Men's 3000mSC | 73 | 1104 |
| Men's 1500m | 110 | 1082 |
| Men's 5000m | 377 | 975 |

Rotich placed fourth in the 2016 Payton Jordan Invitational 3,000m steeplechase in 8:27.62 at Stanford University on May 1, 2016.

1500m 3:48.74 El Paso (USA) 25.03.2017
Mile ind. 4:03.67 Albuquerque (USA) 11.02.2017
3000mSC 8:36.39 Palo Alto (USA) 05.05.2017
Anthony Rotich placed first in 2017 Payton Jordan Invitational 3,000m steeplechase in 8:36.39 at Stanford University on 5 May 2017.

Rotich won 2018 Music City Distance Carnival steeplechase in Nashville, Tennessee in 8:34.56.
