= Emmanuel Bor =

Kenyan-born American long-distance runner

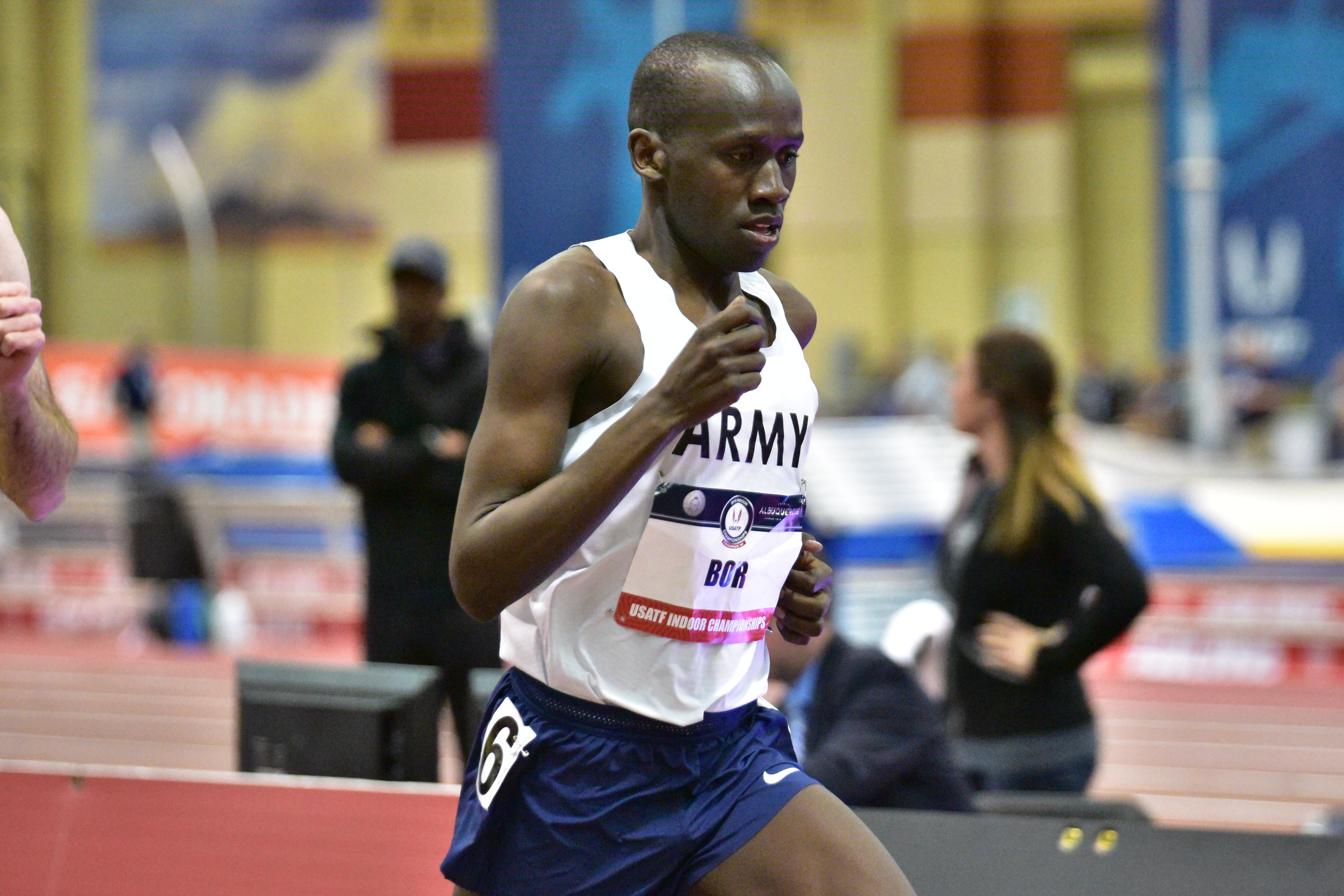
- Bor competing in 2018

Personal information
- Born: 14 April 1988 (age 38) Eldoret, Kenya

Sport
- Sport: Athletics
- Event(s): 3000 metres, 5000 metres, 10,000 metres
- College team: Alabama Crimson Tide
- Club: World Class Athlete Program

Emmanuel Bor (born 14 April 1988) is a Kenyan-born American long-distance runner. He competed collegiately for the University of Alabama. His brothers Hillary and Julius have also been professional runners; however, Julius retired in 2018. After graduating college, Bor joined the US Army and currently competes with the World Class Athlete Program based in Fort Carson, Colorado.

== Personal bests ==
Outdoor

- 800 metres – 1:51.64 (Gainesville 2009)
- 1500 metres – 3:41.65 (Bangkok 2007)
- 3000 metres – 7:52.58 (Eugene 2018)
- Two miles – 8:23.96 (Eugene 2018)
- 5000 metres – 13:10.91 (Los Angeles 2023)
- 10,000 metres – 27:22.80 (Irvine 2021)
- Half marathon – 1:02:46 (Pittsburgh 2014)
- Marathon – 2:22:57 (Porto 2017)

Indoor

- 1500 metres – 3:50.72 (Albuquerque 2018)
- Mile – 3:58.77 (Boston 2018)
- 3000 metres – 7:44.93 (Boston 2018)
- 5000 metres – 13:00.48 (Boston 2022)
