= 2015 Pan American Cross Country Cup =

- Organisers: APA
- Edition: 1st
- Date: February 22
- Host city: Barranquilla, Colombia
- Venue: Avenida al Río
- Events: 4
- Distances: 10 km – Senior men 7 km – Junior men (U20); 7 km – Senior women 5 km – Junior women (U20)
- Participation: 183 athletes from 21 nations

The 2015 Pan American Cross Country Cup took place on February 22, 2015. The races were held at Avenida al Río in Barranquilla, Colombia.

The competition incorporated the 2015 South American Cross Country Championships.

Detailed reports were given.

Complete results were published.

== Medallists ==
| Event | Gold | | Silver | | Bronze | |
|---|---|---|---|---|---|---|
Individual
| Senior men (10 km) | Maksim Korolev; United States | 28:21 | Gilberto Silvestre Lopes; Brazil | 28:31 | Augustus Maiyo; United States | 28:34 |
| Junior (U20) men (7 km) | Justyn Knight; Canada | 19:04 | Conner Mantz; United States | 19:13 | Daniel Ferreira do Nascimento; Brazil | 19:20 |
| Senior women (7 km) | Gladys Tejeda; Peru | 21:18 | Kellyn Taylor; United States | 21:33 | Rachel Hannah; Canada | 21:34 |
| Junior (U20) women (5 km) | Saida Meneses; Peru | 16:29 | Hannah Marian Woodhouse; Canada | 16:35 | Branna MacDougall; Canada | 16:41 |
Team
| Senior men | United States | 15 | Ecuador | 52 | Colombia | 73 |
| Junior (U20) men | United States | 20 | Canada | 38 | Brazil | 53 |
| Senior women | United States | 22 | Canada | 43 | Peru | 51 |
| Junior (U20) women | Canada | 24 | United States | 27 | Peru | 33 |

== Race results ==
=== Senior men's race (10 km) ===
Individual race
| Rank | Athlete | Country | Time |
|---|---|---|---|
| 1st place, gold medalist(s) | Maksim Korolev | United States | 28:21 |
| 2nd place, silver medalist(s) | Gilberto Silvestre Lopes | Brazil | 28:31 |
| 3rd place, bronze medalist(s) | Augustus Maiyo | United States | 28:34 |
| 4 | Jonathan Grey | United States | 28:39 |
| 5 | Byron Piedra | Ecuador | 28:47 |
| 6 | Yerson Orellana | Peru | 28:54 |
| 7 | Joseph Gray | United States | 29:06 |
| 8 | Gabriel Proctor | United States | 29:17 |
| 9 | César Paul Pilaluiza | Ecuador | 29:21 |
| 10 | Kelly Wiebe | Canada | 29:26 |
| 11 | René Champi | Peru | 29:43 |
| 12 | Raúl César Machacuay | Peru | 29:49 |
| 13 | Andrés Camilo Camargo | Colombia | 29:53 |
| 14 | Kevin Tree | Canada | 29:57 |
| 15 | Christian Vásconez | Ecuador | 29:59 |
| 16 | Mizael Carrera | Puerto Rico | 30:04 |
| 17 | Juan Pablo Rangel | Colombia | 30:07 |
| 18 | Marvin Blanco | Venezuela | 30:10 |
| 19 | Luis Ortiz Torres | Puerto Rico | 30:14 |
| 20 | Allison Rocha Peres | Brazil | 30:22 |
| 21 | Giovany Montilla | Colombia | 30:27 |
| 22 | Javier Andrés Peña | Colombia | 30:32 |
| 23 | Juan Adrián Pillajo | Ecuador | 30:40 |
| 24 | Walter Suarez | Venezuela | 30:48 |
| 25 | Matthew Johnson | Canada | 30:54 |
| 26 | Cristopher Guajardo | Chile | 31:14 |
| 27 | William Rodríguez | Colombia | 31:18 |
| 28 | Francisco Javier Abreu | Venezuela | 31:20 |
| 29 | Kirk Brown | Jamaica | 31:26 |
| 30 | Leonel César | Argentina | 31:31 |
| 31 | Williams Alexander Sánchez | El Salvador | 31:39 |
| 32 | Ricardo García Barajas | Mexico | 31:40 |
| 33 | Pedro Rivera Reyes | Puerto Rico | 31:46 |
| 34 | Gustavo Frencia | Argentina | 31:48 |
| 35 | Ryan Cassidy | Canada | 31:55 |
| 36 | Rafael Santos de Novais | Brazil | 31:57 |
| 37 | Dwayne Graham | Jamaica | 32:05 |
| 38 | Wilmer José Palma | Venezuela | 32:30 |
| 39 | Álvaro Sanabria | Costa Rica | 33:00 |
| 40 | Damion Bent | Jamaica | 33:05 |
| 41 | Arturo Javier Maldonado | Ecuador | 33:07 |
| 42 | Diego Rosario | Puerto Rico | 33:09 |
| 43 | Kevin Campbell | Jamaica | 33:28 |
| 44 | Walberto Rodríguez | Puerto Rico | 33:32 |
| 45 | Alejandro Calderón | Costa Rica | 33:41 |
| 46 | Juan Robles | U.S. Virgin Islands | 33:53 |
| 47 | Leonardo Charon | Cuba | 34:13 |
| 48 | Lamont Marshall | Bermuda | 34:25 |
| 49 | Carlos Alejandro González | Paraguay | 35:25 |
| 50 | George Smith | Trinidad and Tobago | 36:27 |
| 51 | O'Brien Frith | Jamaica | 37:04 |
| | Jhordan Ccope | Peru | DNF |
| | Yamid Naranjo | Colombia | DNF |
| | Barry Britt | Canada | DNS |
| | Jacinto Milanes | Cuba | DNS |
| | Cosme Ancelmo de Souza | Brazil | DNS |

Teams
| Rank | Team | Points |
|---|---|---|
| 1st place, gold medalist(s) | United States: Maksim Korolev / 1; Augustus Maiyo / 3; Jonathan Grey / 4; Joseph Gray / 7; (Gabriel Proctor) / (8) | 15 |
| 2nd place, silver medalist(s) | Ecuador: Byron Piedra / 5; César Paul Pilaluiza / 9; Christian Vásconez / 15; Juan Adrián Pillajo / 23; (Arturo Javier Maldonado) / (41) | 52 |
| 3rd place, bronze medalist(s) | Colombia: Andrés Camargo / 13; Juan Pablo Rangel / 17; Giovany Montilla / 21; Javier Andrés Peña / 22; (William Rodríguez) / (27); (Yamid Naranjo) / (DNF) | 73 |
| 4 | Canada: Kelly Wiebe / 10; Kevin Tree / 14; Matthew Johnson / 25; Ryan Cassidy / 35 | 84 |
| 5 | Venezuela: Marvin Blanco / 18; Walter Suarez / 24; Francisco Javier Abreu / 28; Wilmer José Palma / 38 | 108 |
| 6 | Puerto Rico: Mizael Carrera / 16; Luis Ortiz Torres / 19; Pedro Rivera Reyes / 33; Diego Rosario / 42; (Walberto Rodríguez) / (44) | 110 |
| 7 | Jamaica: Kirk Brown / 29; Dwayne Graham / 37; Damion Bent / 40; Kevin Campbell / 43; (O'Brien Frith) / (51) | 149 |
| | Peru: (Yerson Orellana) / (6); (René Champi) / (11); (Raúl César Machacuay) / (12); (Jhordan Ccope) / (DNF) | (DNF) |

=== Junior (U20) men's race (7 km) ===
Individual race
| Rank | Athlete | Country | Time |
|---|---|---|---|
| 1st place, gold medalist(s) | Justyn Knight | Canada | 19:04 |
| 2nd place, silver medalist(s) | Conner Mantz | United States | 19:13 |
| 3rd place, bronze medalist(s) | Daniel Ferreira do Nascimento | Brazil | 19:20 |
| 4 | John Dressel | United States | 19:23 |
| 5 | Michael Tonatiuh Ramírez | Mexico | 19:30 |
| 6 | Eric Hamer | United States | 19:41 |
| 7 | Jesús Nava | Mexico | 19:43 |
| 8 | Fred Huxham | United States | 19:43 |
| 9 | Conner Hendrickson | United States | 19:47 |
| 10 | Nathan Tadesse | Canada | 19:50 |
| 11 | Benjamin Preisner | Canada | 19:56 |
| 12 | Felipe Rocha e Pinto | Brazil | 20:00 |
| 13 | Dionatan Cardoso dos Santos | Brazil | 20:06 |
| 14 | Diego Arévalo | Ecuador | 20:09 |
| 15 | Danilo Vera | Chile | 20:12 |
| 16 | Rory Linkletter | Canada | 20:16 |
| 17 | Pedro Andrés Román | Colombia | 20:20 |
| 18 | Brayan Jeferson | Ecuador | 20:24 |
| 19 | John Torres | Puerto Rico | 20:28 |
| 20 | Luis Rivera | Puerto Rico | 20:31 |
| 21 | Amed Figueroa | Puerto Rico | 20:32 |
| 22 | Alexander Mauricio Tipán | Ecuador | 20:35 |
| 23 | Henry Jara | Peru | 20:51 |
| 24 | Daniel Reyes Morales | Mexico | 20:52 |
| 25 | Patrick Aguinaldo Barbosa | Brazil | 20:58 |
| 26 | Marcelo Samuel Maldonado | Ecuador | 20:58 |
| 27 | Garfield Gordon | Jamaica | 20:58 |
| 28 | Víctor Ortiz | Puerto Rico | 21:01 |
| 29 | Sebastián Sánchez | Colombia | 21:06 |
| 30 | Shane Buchanan | Jamaica | 21:13 |
| 31 | Erik Javier Alcivar | Ecuador | 21:20 |
| 32 | Joaquín Wachtendorff | Chile | 21:24 |
| 33 | Oswaldo Terán | Venezuela | 21:40 |
| 34 | Michael Merchan | Puerto Rico | 21:45 |
| 35 | Hugo Catrileo | Chile | 21:46 |
| 36 | Sebastián Cubides | Colombia | 21:55 |
| 37 | Keenan Lawerence | Jamaica | 22:01 |
| 38 | Sergio Alejandro López | Colombia | 22:21 |
| 39 | Thaleetio Green | Jamaica | 22:33 |
| 40 | Juan Camilo Rodríguez | Colombia | 22:46 |
| 41 | Jules Burnotte | Canada | 23:02 |
| 42 | Andrés Mauricio Rivera | Costa Rica | 23:10 |
| 43 | Argenys Mojica | Puerto Rico | 23:44 |
| 44 | Shevon Parks | Jamaica | 23:55 |
| 45 | Kenneth Alexander Mejía | Costa Rica | 23:57 |
| | Jeremiah Ort | Canada | DNF |
| | Ernesto Abreu | Cuba | DNS |

Teams
| Rank | Team | Points |
|---|---|---|
| 1st place, gold medalist(s) | United States: Conner Mantz / 2; John Dressel / 4; Eric Hamer / 6; Fred Huxham / 8; (Conner Hendrickson) / (9) | 20 |
| 2nd place, silver medalist(s) | Canada: Justyn Knight / 1; Nathan Tadesse / 10; Benjamin Preisner / 11; Rory Linkletter / 16; (Jules Burnotte) / (41); (Jeremiah Ort) / (DNF) | 38 |
| 3rd place, bronze medalist(s) | Brazil: Daniel Ferreira do Nascimento / 3; Felipe Rocha e Pinto / 12; Dionatan Cardoso dos Santos / 13; Patrick Aguinaldo Barbosa / 25 | 53 |
| 4 | Ecuador: Diego Arévalo / 14; Brayan Jeferson / 18; Alexander Mauricio Tipán / 22; Marcelo Samuel Maldonado / 26; (Erik Javier Alcivar) / (31) | 80 |
| 5 | Puerto Rico: John Torres / 19; Luis Rivera / 20; Amed Figueroa / 21; Víctor Ortiz / 28; (Michael Merchan) / (34); (Argenys Mojica) / (43) | 88 |
| 6 | Colombia: Pedro Andrés Román / 17; Sebastián Sánchez / 29; Sebastián Cubides / 36; Sergio Alejandro López / 38; (Juan Camilo Rodríguez) / (40) | 120 |
| 7 | Jamaica: Garfield Gordon / 27; Shane Buchanan / 30; Keenan Lawerence / 37; Thaleetio Green / 39; (Shevon Parks) / (44) | 133 |

=== Senior women's race (7 km) ===
Individual race
| Rank | Athlete | Country | Time |
|---|---|---|---|
| 1st place, gold medalist(s) | Gladys Tejeda | Peru | 21:18 |
| 2nd place, silver medalist(s) | Kellyn Taylor | United States | 21:33 |
| 3rd place, bronze medalist(s) | Rachel Hannah | Canada | 21:34 |
| 4 | Beverly Ramos | Puerto Rico | 21:35 |
| 5 | Mattie Suver | United States | 21:36 |
| 6 | Rochelle Kanuho | United States | 21:42 |
| 7 | Muriel Coneo | Colombia | 21:56 |
| 8 | Sueli Pereira Silva | Brazil | 21:59 |
| 9 | Christine Babcock | United States | 22:03 |
| 10 | Andreia Aparecida Hessel | Brazil | 22:06 |
| 11 | Natasha Labeaud | Canada | 22:07 |
| 12 | Melinda Martínez | Puerto Rico | 22:08 |
| 13 | Fiona Benson | Canada | 22:09 |
| 14 | Soledad Torre | Peru | 22:1 |
| 15 | Eliona Delgado | Peru | 22:13 |
| 16 | Natasha Wodak | Canada | 22:16 |
| 17 | María Pastuña | Ecuador | 22:24 |
| 18 | Lindsay Carson | Canada | 22:24 |
| 19 | Sara Mercedes Prieto | Mexico | 22:34 |
| 20 | Jillian Forsey | Canada | 22:35 |
| 21 | Karina Villazana | Peru | 22:5 |
| 22 | Kelly Arias | Colombia | 22:52 |
| 23 | Yudileyvis Castillo | Cuba | 22:54 |
| 24 | Valdilene dos Santos Silva | Brazil | 22:58 |
| 25 | Tonya Nero | Trinidad and Tobago | 23:18 |
| 26 | Irma Vila Sonco | Bolivia | 23:23 |
| 27 | Maria Aparecida Ferraz | Brazil | 23:29 |
| 28 | María Leticia Añazco | Paraguay | 23:4 |
| 29 | Sandra Marcela Rosas | Colombia | 23:54 |
| 30 | Fabiola Ramos Colón | Puerto Rico | 24:26 |
| 31 | Stefany Jeeseth Chiquiza | Colombia | 24:48 |
| 32 | Samantha Shukla | Trinidad and Tobago | 24:52 |
| 33 | Milena Pérez | Cuba | 24:55 |
| 34 | Ana Catalina Skipton | Costa Rica | 25:02 |
| 35 | Natalia Hernández | Puerto Rico | 25:09 |
| 36 | Ashley Laureano | Puerto Rico | 25:38 |
| 37 | Ruth David | U.S. Virgin Islands | 26:07 |
| | Alicia Nelson | United States | DNF |

Teams
| Rank | Team | Points |
|---|---|---|
| 1st place, gold medalist(s) | United States: Kellyn Taylor / 2; Mattie Suver / 5; Rochelle Kanuho / 6; Christine Babcock / 9; (Alicia Nelson) / (DNF) | 22 |
| 2nd place, silver medalist(s) | Canada: Rachel Hannah / 3; Natasha Labeaud / 11; Fiona Benson / 13; Natasha Wodak / 16; (Lindsay Carson) / (18); (Jillian Forsey) / (20) | 43 |
| 3rd place, bronze medalist(s) | Peru: Gladys Tejeda / 1; Soledad Torre / 14; Eliona Delgado / 15; Karina Villazana / 21 | 51 |
| 4 | Brazil: Sueli Pereira Silva / 8; Andreia Hessel / 10; Valdilene dos Santos Silva / 24; Maria Aparecida Ferraz / 27 | 69 |
| 5 | Puerto Rico: Beverly Ramos / 4; Melinda Martínez / 12; Fabiola Ramos Colón / 30; Natalia Hernández / 35; (Ashley Laureano) / (36) | 81 |
| 6 | Colombia: Muriel Coneo / 7; Kelly Arias / 22; Sandra Marcela Rosas / 29; Stefany Jeeseth Chiquiza / 31 | 89 |

=== Junior (U20) women's race (5 km) ===
Individual race
| Rank | Athlete | Country | Time |
|---|---|---|---|
| 1st place, gold medalist(s) | Saida Meneses | Peru | 16:29 |
| 2nd place, silver medalist(s) | Hannah Marian Woodhouse | Canada | 16:35 |
| 3rd place, bronze medalist(s) | Branna MacDougall | Canada | 16:41 |
| 4 | Sunilda Lozano | Peru | 16:44 |
| 5 | Katie Rainsberger | United States | 16:44 |
| 6 | Rachel Koon | United States | 16:45 |
| 7 | Lauren Gregory | United States | 16:46 |
| 8 | Nicole Hutchinson | Canada | 16:50 |
| 9 | Megan Connell | United States | 16:52 |
| 10 | Evelyn Escobar | Peru | 16:59 |
| 11 | Jennifer Baragar | Canada | 17:00 |
| 12 | Lina Maritza Pantoja | Colombia | 17:11 |
| 13 | Shanieke Watson | Jamaica | 17:12 |
| 14 | Ariadna Rivera | Mexico | 17:21 |
| 15 | Ana Paula Silva de Almeida Feitosa | Brazil | 17:33 |
| 16 | Mary Claire Smith | Canada | 17:36 |
| 17 | Karina Gualberto | Brazil | 17:37 |
| 18 | Ruth Cjuro | Peru | 17:39 |
| 19 | María de Jesús Ruis | Mexico | 17:44 |
| 20 | Valeria de la Nube Cornejo | Ecuador | 17:46 |
| 21 | Bailey Ness | United States | 17:52 |
| 22 | María José Calfilaf | Chile | 17:55 |
| 23 | Leidy Maritza Lozano | Colombia | 17:59 |
| 24 | Mirelle Martens | Canada | 18:00 |
| 25 | Keyshla Barreto | Puerto Rico | 18:01 |
| 26 | María Isabel Ortega | Colombia | 18:06 |
| 27 | Paulina Burgos | Chile | 18:06 |
| 28 | Fryshna Vianey Santa Clara | Mexico | 18:10 |
| 29 | Daliuska Tamayo | Cuba | 18:20 |
| 30 | Jaksenia Figueroa | Puerto Rico | 18:24 |
| 31 | Soe Maldonado | Puerto Rico | 18:34 |
| 32 | Crystal Brown | Jamaica | 18:35 |
| 33 | Alejandra Barba | Mexico | 18:43 |
| 34 | Alondra Bosque | Puerto Rico | 18:48 |
| 35 | Andrea Jiménez | Chile | 18:59 |
| 36 | Monifa Green | Jamaica | 19:00 |
| 37 | Evellin Ianca dos Passos | Brazil | 19:03 |
| 38 | Chrisdyala Moraga | Costa Rica | 19:07 |
| 39 | Kensley Hernández | Puerto Rico | 19:07 |
| 40 | Zenon Kerr | Jamaica | 19:22 |
| 41 | Kenyaliz Pérez | Puerto Rico | 19:34 |
| 42 | Shamona Hunt | Jamaica | 20:20 |
| 43 | Diana Sofía Guevara | Colombia | 20:21 |
| 44 | María Aldana González | Costa Rica | 20:30 |
| 45 | Sofía Andrada | Uruguay | 22:14 |
| 46 | Adachely Julia Peñate | Cuba | 22:14 |
| | Lizbeth Talia Vicuña | Ecuador | DNS |
| | Ana Karolyne de Campos Silva | Brazil | DNS |

Teams
| Rank | Team | Points |
|---|---|---|
| 1st place, gold medalist(s) | Canada: Hannah Marian Woodhouse / 2; Branna MacDougall / 3; Nicole Hutchinson / 8; Jennifer Baragar / 11; (Mary Claire Smith) / (16); (Mirelle Martens) / (24) | 24 |
| 2nd place, silver medalist(s) | United States: Katie Rainsberger / 5; Rachel Koon / 6; Lauren Gregory / 7; Megan Connell / 9; (Bailey Ness) / (21) | 27 |
| 3rd place, bronze medalist(s) | Peru: Saida Meneses / 1; Sunilda Lozano / 4; Evelyn Escobar / 10; Ruth Cjuro / 18 | 33 |
| 4 | Mexico: Ariadna Rivera / 14; María de Jesús Ruis / 19; Fryshna Vianey Santa Clara / 28; Alejandra Barba / 33 | 94 |
| 5 | Colombia: Lina Maritza Pantoja / 12; Leidy Maritza Lozano / 23; María Isabel Ortega / 26; Diana Sofía Guevara / 43 | 104 |
| 6 | Puerto Rico: Keyshla Barreto / 25; Jaksenia Figueroa / 30; Soe Maldonado / 31; Alondra Bosque / 34; (Kensley Hernández) / (39); (Kenyaliz Pérez) / (41) | 120 |

== Medal table (unofficial) ==
* Host nation (Colombia)

| Rank | Nation | Gold | Silver | Bronze | Total |
|---|---|---|---|---|---|
| 1 | United States | 4 | 3 | 1 | 8 |
| 2 | Canada | 2 | 3 | 2 | 7 |
| 3 | Peru | 2 | 0 | 2 | 4 |
| 4 | Brazil | 0 | 1 | 2 | 3 |
| 5 | Ecuador | 0 | 1 | 0 | 1 |
| 6 | Colombia* | 0 | 0 | 1 | 1 |
| Totals (6 entries) | | 8 | 8 | 8 | 24 |

- Note: Totals include both individual and team medals, with medals in the team competition counting as one medal.

== Participation ==
According to an unofficial count, 183 athletes from 21 countries participated.

- Argentina (2)
- Bermuda (1)
- Bolivia (1)
- Brazil (14)
- Canada (22)
- Chile (7)
- Colombia (19)
- Costa Rica (7)
- Cuba (5)
- Ecuador (12)
- El Salvador (1)
- Jamaica (15)
- Mexico (9)
- Paraguay (2)
- Peru (13)
- Puerto Rico (22)
- Trinidad and Tobago (3)
- Uruguay (1)
- United States (20)
- U.S. Virgin Islands (2)
- Venezuela (5)

== See also ==
- 2015 in athletics (track and field)
