= Pan American Cross Country Cup =

Running competition

- Sport: Cross country running
- Founded: 2015
- Continent: Americas (APA)

The Pan American Cross Country Cup (Copa Panamericana de Cross Country) is an international cross country running competition organized by the Association of Panamerican Athletics (APA) for athletes representing the countries and territories of its member associations. It was established in 2015. Races are featured for senior, junior (U-20) and youth (U-18) athletes. The inaugural 2015 edition in Barranquilla, Colombia simultaneously serves as NACAC Cross Country Championships and South American Cross Country Championships.

== Editions ==
Edition	Year	City	Country	Date	Venue
I	2015	Barranquilla, Atlántico	Colombia	February 22	
II	2016	Caraballeda, Vargas	Venezuela	March 4	Campo de Golf de Caraballeda
III	2018	Opico	El Salvador	February 17	
IV	2020	Victoria	Canada	February 29	Bear Mountain
V	2022	Serra	Brazil	March 27	Alphaville Jacuhy de Serra Condominium

== Results ==
Complete results were published.

=== Senior men ===
Year	Gold		Silver		Bronze	
2015	Maksim Korolev; United States	28:21	Gilberto Silvestre Lopes; Brazil	28:31	Augustus Maiyo; United States	28:34
2016	Donald Cowart; United States	31:19	Gilberto Silvestre; Brazil	31:35	Max King; United States	31:42
2018	Joseph Gray; United States	30:02	Augustus Maiyo; United States	30:05	Cristhian Pacheco Mendoza; Peru	30:08
2020	Johnatas de Oliveira Cruz; Brazil	32:50	Anthony Rotich; United States	32:50	Paul Ramirez; Peru	33:11
2022	Wendell Jeronimo Souza; Brazil	32:03	Rene Champi; Peru	32:07	Marciel Miranda de Almeida Silva; Brazil	32:17

=== Senior women ===
Year	Gold		Silver		Bronze	
2015	Gladys Tejeda; Peru	21:18	Kellyn Taylor; United States	21:33	Rachel Hannah; Canada	21:34
2016	Allison Grace Morgan; United States	37:41	Sasha Gollish; Canada	37:53	Luz Mery Rojas; Peru	38:04
2018	Carmen Toaquiza; Ecuador	35:04	Gladys Machacuay Huaman; Peru	35:06	Luz Mery Rojas Llanco; Peru	35:07
2020	Genevieve Lalonde; Canada	37:37	Carrie Verdon; United States	38:09	Lizaida Thalia Valdivia; Peru	38:12
2022	Maria Lucineida da Silva Moreira; Brazil	36:21	Nubia de Oliveira Silva; Brazil	36:48	Simone Ponte Ferraz; Brazil	36:51

=== Junior men ===
Year	Gold		Silver		Bronze	
2015	Justyn Knight; Canada	19:04	Conner Mantz; United States	19:13	Daniel Ferreira do Nascimento; Brazil	19:20
2016	Daniel Ferreira Do Nascimento; Brazil	26:05	Thomas Pollard; United States	26:14	Omar Ramosv; Peru	26:35
2018	Connor Jeffrey Lane; United States	25:06	Tyler Dozzi; Canada	25:19	Thomas Nobbs; Canada	25:23
2020	Corey Gorgas; United States	27:15	Evan Bishop; United States	27:20	Alejandro Alania; Peru	27:27
2022	Janio Marcos Goncalves Varjao; Brazil	26:19	Jhoseph Nunez; Peru	28:15	Diego Caldeira; Venezuela	28:25

=== Junior women ===
Year	Gold		Silver		Bronze	
2015	Saida Meneses; Peru	16:29	Hannah Marian Woodhouse; Canada	16:35	Branna MacDougall; Canada	16:41
2016	Branna MacDougall; Canada	21:31	Madeleine Ghazarian; Canada	21:31	Saida Meneses; Peru	21:57
2018	Brogan MacDougall; Canada	20:36	Laura Dickinson; Canada	20:54	Martha MacDonald; Canada	21:02
2020	Brooke Rauber; United States	23:12	Sadie Sigfstead; Canada	23:23	Jhenifer Melchor; Peru	23:46
2022	Gabriela de Freitas Tardivo; Brazil	23:05	Aylana Ferreira Cezar; Brazil	23:27	Veronica Huacasi; Peru	23:28
