= 2020 Pan American Cross Country Cup =

- Organisers: Association of Panamerican Athletics
- Edition: 4th
- Date: February 29
- Host city: Victoria, British Columbia, Canada
- Venue: Bear Mountain
- Events: 4
- Distances: 10 km – Senior men 8 km – Junior men (U20); 8 km – Senior women 6 km – Junior women (U20)
- Official website: https://panamxccup2020.com/

The 2020 Pan American Cross Country Cup took place on February 29, 2020. The races will be held at Bear Mountain in Victoria, British Columbia, Canada.

== Medalists ==
Event	Gold		Silver		Bronze	
Individual
Senior men (10 km)	Johnatas de Oliveira Cruz; Brazil	32:50	Anthony Rotich; United States	32:50	Paul Ramirez; Peru	33:11
Junior (U20) men (8 km)	Corey Gorgas; United States	27:15	Evan Bishop; United States	27:20	Alejandro Alania; Peru	27:27
Senior women (10 km)	Genevieve Lalonde; Canada	37:37	Carrie Verdon; United States	38:09	Lizaida Thalia Valdivia; Peru	38:12
Junior (U20) women (6 km)	Brooke Rauber; United States	23:12	Sadie Sigfstead; Canada	23:23	Jhenifer Melchor; Peru	23:46
Team
Senior men	United States	12	Brazil	19	Canada	23
Junior (U20) men	United States	12	Peru	26	Canada	27
Senior women	Canada	12	United States	13	Peru	20
Junior (U20) women	Canada	15	Peru	18	United States	26

== Race results ==
=== Senior men's race (10 km) ===
Individual race
Rank	Athlete	Country	Time
1st place, gold medalist(s)	Johnatas de Oliveira Cruz	Brazil	32:50
2nd place, silver medalist(s)	Anthony Rotich	United States	32:50
3rd place, bronze medalist(s)	Paul Ramirez	Peru	33:11
4	Dillon Maggard	United States	33:23
5	Connor Black	Canada	33:25
6	David Goodman	United States	33:33
7	John Gay	Canada	33:35
8	Daniel Ferreira do Nascimento	Brazil	33:43
9	Nicholas Hauger	United States	33:45
10	Gilberto Silvestre Lopes	Brazil	34:05
11	Mitchell Ubene	Canada	34:08
12	Michael Jordan	United States	34:12
13	Tai Dinger	United States	34:14
14	Fernando Cervantes	Mexico	34:16
15	Abraham Daniel Hernandez	Mexico	34:16
16	Jean-Simon Desgagnes	Canada	34:25
17	Kieran McDonald	Canada	34:30
18	Leonardo Trejo Camargo	Mexico	34:36
19	Walter Niña	Peru	34:38
20	Yuri Labra	Peru	34:43
21	Jasus Nava Aguila	Mexico	34:49
22	Frank Lujan	Peru	35:25
23	Brandon Allen	Canada	35:30
24	Luis Castro Coto	Costa Rica	36:07
25	Oscar Antonio Aldana	El Salvador	36:23
26	Diego Armando Gonzales	Colombia	37:41
27	Gabriel Curtis	Bahamas	38:12
28	Belodie Vilovar	Guadeloupe	39:37
29	Samuel Morales	Puerto Rico	41:14
30	Oneil Williams	Bahamas	42:40

Teams
Rank	Team	Points
1st place, gold medalist(s)		
2nd place, silver medalist(s)		
3rd place, bronze medalist(s)		
4		
5		
6		
7		

=== Junior (U20) men's race (8 km) ===
Individual race
Rank	Athlete	Country	Time
1st place, gold medalist(s)			
2nd place, silver medalist(s)			
3rd place, bronze medalist(s)			
4			
5			
6			
7			
8			
9			
10			
11			
12			
13			
14			
CAN Kevin Robertson July 13, 2001
CAN Philippe Morneau-Cartier April 3, 2001
CAN Dakota Goguen July 23, 2002
CAN Keon Wallingford April 17, 2001
CAN Scott Arndt March 9, 2001
CAN Chase Canty July 6, 2001
USA Jacob Harris January 24, 2001
USA Alex Comerford February 20, 2001
USA Corey Gorgas July 2, 2001
USA Lucas Chung May 11, 2001
USA Evan Bishop August 13, 2001
USA Daniel Beam April 2, 2001
MEX Mario Uriel Lopez Suarez October 11, 2001
MEX Luis Elian Cornejo Hernandez May 12, 2001
MEX Erick Salvador Perez October 10, 2001
MEX Cesar Daniel Gomez Ponce September 25, 2001
PER Alejandro Alania February 16, 2001
PER Guido Bustamante April 19, 2002
PER Julio Palomino April 8, 2001
PER Juan Huamani August 11, 2002
BRA Lucas Pinho Leite February 20, 2002
BRA Eduardo Bandeira Baltazar May 3, 2002
BRA Vitor de Oliveira da Silva December 2, 2001
CRA Brandom Barrantes Calderón October 28, 2002
BAH Denzel Sawyer July 18, 2004
BAH Mitchell Curtis May 15, 2003
PAN Raphael Palma December 2, 2002
PUR Carlos Alberto Vilches October 29, 2001
PUR Hector Alberto Pagan October 16, 2001
PUR John Castro May 14, 2001
PUR Kevin Cubillette July 14, 2001
PUR Luis Rosado November 8, 2001

Teams
Rank	Team	Points
1st place, gold medalist(s)		
2nd place, silver medalist(s)		
3rd place, bronze medalist(s)		
4		
5		
6		
7		

=== Senior women's race (8 km) ===
Individual race
Rank	Athlete	Country	Time
1st place, gold medalist(s)			
2nd place, silver medalist(s)			
3rd place, bronze medalist(s)			
4			
5			
6			
7			
8			
9			
10			
11			
12			
13			
14			
CAN Genevieve Lalonde
CAN Maria Bernard-Galea
CAN Natasha Wodak
CAN Victoria Coates
CAN Kirsten Lee
CAN Hannah Woodhouse
USA Tansey Lystad
USA Grace Graham-Zamudio
USA Sarah Pease
USA Carrie Verdon
USA Kalene Morris
USA Danielle Shanahan
MEX Cindy Meza Dominguez
MEX Andrea Soraya Ramirez Limon
MEX Maria de Jesus Ruiz Acuna
PER Rina Cjuro
PER Lizaida Thalia Valdivia
PER Margarita Nunez
PER Saida Meneses
BRA Tatiane Raquel da Silva
BRA Graziele Zarri
BRA Amanda Aparecida de Oliveira
GDL Roxane Thery
PUR Soe Maldonado
VEN Maria Luisa Garrido Acosta
COL Cusario Gerardin Cusaria Rodrigues

Teams
Rank	Team	Points
1st place, gold medalist(s)		
2nd place, silver medalist(s)		
3rd place, bronze medalist(s)		
4		
5		
6		
7		

=== Junior (U20) women's race (6 km) ===
Individual race
Rank	Athlete	Country	Time
1st place, gold medalist(s)			
2nd place, silver medalist(s)			
3rd place, bronze medalist(s)			
4			
5			
6			
7			
8			
9			
10			
11			
12			
13			
14			
CAN Sadie Sigfstead May 17, 2003
CAN Abbey Yuhasz July 26, 2002
CAN Ceili McCabe September 17, 2001
CAN Petal Palmer February 10, 2002
CAN Annika Ariano September 18, 2001
CAN Mackenzie Campbell August 24, 2002
USA Kalea Bartolotto April 24, 2001
USA Sophia McDonnelle May 3, 2001
USA Rayna Stanziano July 26, 2001
USA Bailey Brinkerhoff June 12, 2001
USA Brooke Rauber July 12, 2002
USA Abigail Osterlund June 13, 2001
MEX Adela Honorato Dominguez December 8, 2004
MEX Paola Cordero Palato February 5, 2002
MEX Sandra Nayelli Ruiz Acuna May 14, 2002
MEX Arian Ivette Chia Hernandez June 5, 2001
PER Inocencia Huacasi June 22, 2001
PER Sandra Salazar January 23, 2001
PER Jhenifer Melchor September 15, 2002
PER Aurea Salvatierra March 1, 2001
BRA Nubia de Oliveira Silva June 4, 2002
BRA Gabriela de Freitas Tardivo December 4, 2004
BRA Mirelle Leite da Silva November 3, 2002
PAN Lucia Palma November 5, 2003
PUR Adanelys Rodriguez August 15, 2001
PUR Fabianna Szoreny June 5, 2002
PUR Jorelis Vargas December 5, 2001
PUR Natisha Fontanez July 15, 2001
PUR Yulianne Lugo January 14, 2001
COL Alejandra Sierra Jimenez 22-Feb-01

Teams
Rank	Team	Points
1st place, gold medalist(s)		
2nd place, silver medalist(s)		
3rd place, bronze medalist(s)		
4		
5		
6		
7		

== Medal table (unofficial) ==
* Host nation (Canada)

Rank	Nation	Gold	Silver	Bronze	Total
1	United States	4	4	1	9
2	Canada*	3	1	2	6
3	Brazil	1	1	0	2
4	Peru	0	2	5	7
Totals (4 entries)		8	8	8	24

- Note: Totals include both individual and team medals, with medals in the team competition counting as one medal.

== Participation ==
According to an unofficial count, 183 athletes from 21 countries participated.

- Argentina (0)
- Bermuda (0)
- Bolivia (0)
- Brazil (0)
- Canada (0)
- Chile (0)
- Colombia (0)
- Costa Rica (0)
- Cuba (0)
- Ecuador (0)
- El Salvador (0)
- Jamaica (0)
- Mexico (0)
- Paraguay (0)
- Peru (0)
- Puerto Rico (0)
- Trinidad and Tobago (0)
- Uruguay (0)
- United States (0)
- U.S. Virgin Islands (0)
- Venezuela (0)

== See also ==
- 2020 in athletics (track and field)
- Temporary Results
