= 2014 NACAC Cross Country Championships =

- Organisers: NACAC
- Edition: 11th
- Date: February 22
- Host city: Mount Irvine, Tobago, Trinidad and Tobago
- Venue: Mount Irvine Bay Golf Course
- Events: 4
- Distances: 8 km – Senior men 6 km – Junior men (U20); 6 km – Senior women 4 km – Junior women (U20)
- Participation: 103 athletes from 10 nations

The 2014 NACAC Cross Country Championships took place on February 22, 2014. The races were held at the Mount Irvine Bay Golf Course in Mount Irvine, Trinidad and Tobago. A detailed report of the event was given for the IAAF.

The event was overshadowed by the death of 17-year-old Jamaican junior Cavahn McKenzie who collapsed at the end 6 km junior event, and died shortly after his immediate transfer to Scarborough general hospital.

Complete results were published.

== Medallists ==
Event	Gold		Silver		Bronze	
Individual
Senior men (8 km)	Joseph Gray; United States	24:13.86	Oscar Mateo Cerón; Mexico	24:25.31	Gregory Montgomery; United States	24:32.67
Junior (U20) men (6 km)	Sean McGorty; United States	18:11.30	Ben Flanagan; Canada	18:25.10	Sam Wharton; United States	18:29.96
Senior women (6 km)	Kellyn Johnson; United States	20:09.46	Rachel Hannah; Canada	20:29.79	Carrie Dimoff; United States	20:31.48
Junior (U20) women (4 km)	Jaimie Phelan; Canada	13:38.93	Jillian Forsey; Canada	13:39.91	Claire Smith; Canada	13:43.27
Team
Senior men	United States	16	Canada	30	Jamaica	47
Junior (U20) men	United States	14	Canada	28	Puerto Rico	61
Senior women	United States	16	Canada	25	Trinidad and Tobago	58
Junior (U20) women	Canada	16	United States	22	Puerto Rico	61

== Race results ==
=== Senior men's race (8 km) ===
Individual race
Rank	Athlete	Country	Time
1st place, gold medalist(s)	Joseph Gray	United States	24:13.86
2nd place, silver medalist(s)	Oscar Mateo Cerón	Mexico	24:25.31
3rd place, bronze medalist(s)	Gregory Montgomery	United States	24:32.67
4	Barry Britt	Canada	24:40.70
5	Samuel Alexander	United States	24:54.77
6	Kyle O'Neil	Canada	25:00.96
7	Richard Medina	United States	25:06.66
8	Theo Hunt	Canada	25:29.78
9	Dwayne Graham	Jamaica	25:40.93
10	Damian Bent	Jamaica	25:43.41
11	Lamont Marshall	Bermuda	25:54.34
12	Saheed Khan	Canada	25:55.57
13	Kevin Campbell	Jamaica	26:19.02
14	Trey Simons	Bermuda	26:33.45
15	Kirk Brown	Jamaica	26:36.11
16	Shawn Pitter	Jamaica	26:46.15
17	Jules la Rode	Trinidad and Tobago	26:51.25
18	Albert Jay Donawa	Bermuda	27:03.20
19	Juan Robles	U.S. Virgin Islands	27:17.99
20	Kendis Bullard	Trinidad and Tobago	28:02.85
21	Kade Sobers	Trinidad and Tobago	28:15.53
22	George Smith	Trinidad and Tobago	29:05.20
23	Juma Mouchette	Bermuda	29:22.49
24	Shirvan Baboolal	Trinidad and Tobago	29:23.26
25	David Ferguson	Bahamas	30:24.76
—	Ryan Cassidy	Canada	DNF

Teams
Rank	Team	Points
1st place, gold medalist(s)	United States: Joseph Gray / 1; Gregory Montgomery / 3; Samuel Alexander / 5; Richard Medina / 7	16
2nd place, silver medalist(s)	Canada: Barry Britt / 4; Kyle O'Neil / 6; Theo Hunt / 8; Saheed Khan / 12	30
3rd place, bronze medalist(s)	Jamaica: Dwayne Graham / 9; Damian Bent / 10; Kevin Campbell / 13; Kirk Brown / 15	47
4	Bermuda: Lamont Marshall / 11; Trey Simons / 14; Albert Jay Donawa / 18; Juma Mouchette / 23	66
5	Trinidad and Tobago: Jules la Rode / 17; Kendis Bullard / 20; Kade Sobers / 21; George Smith / 22	80

=== Junior (U20) men's race (6 km) ===
Individual race
Rank	Athlete	Country	Time
1st place, gold medalist(s)	Sean McGorty	United States	18:11.30
2nd place, silver medalist(s)	Ben Flanagan	Canada	18:25.10
3rd place, bronze medalist(s)	Sam Wharton	United States	18:29.96
4	Jack Keelan	United States	18:38.57
5	Justyn Knight	Canada	18:42.64
6	Jeffrey Thies	United States	18:46.09
7	Estevan de la Rosa	United States	18:48.09
8	Mike Tate	Canada	18:48.11
9	Sandro Antonio Enríquez	Mexico	19:02.14
10	John Torres	Puerto Rico	19:16.03
11	Reyes Daniel Reyes	Mexico	19:16.04
12	O'Brien Frith	Jamaica	19:18.23
13	Thomas Getty	Canada	19:19.98
14	Isaac Dobos	Canada	19:21.20
15	Joshua Correa	Puerto Rico	19:24.77
16	Garfield Gordon	Jamaica	19:25.14
17	Antonio Cardona	Puerto Rico	19:42.26
18	Miles Matthews	Canada	19:44.14
19	Luis Rivera	Puerto Rico	20:01.80
20	Gerardo Hernández	Puerto Rico	20:12.60
21	Cavahn McKenzie	Jamaica	20:25.61
22	Akeem Marshall	Trinidad and Tobago	20:31.34
23	Shevan Parks	Jamaica	20:31.34
24	Michael Merchán	Puerto Rico	20:58.78
25	Ashton Gill	Trinidad and Tobago	21:11.84
26	Jevon Joseph	Trinidad and Tobago	21:21.97
27	Joshua James	Trinidad and Tobago	21:23.24
28	Daniel Elie	Trinidad and Tobago	21:29.30
29	Atiba Samuel	Trinidad and Tobago	22:35.37
30	Romar Mundle	Jamaica	25:47.73
31	Dericko Hinsey	Bahamas	26:32.98

Teams
Rank	Team	Points
1st place, gold medalist(s)	United States: Sean McGorty / 1; Sam Wharton / 3; Jack Keelan / 4; Jeffrey Thies / 6	14
2nd place, silver medalist(s)	Canada: Ben Flanagan / 2; Justyn Knight / 5; Mike Tate / 8; Thomas Getty / 13	28
3rd place, bronze medalist(s)	Puerto Rico: John Torres / 10; Joshua Correa / 15; Antonio Cardona / 17; Luis Rivera / 19	61
4	Jamaica: O'Brien Frith / 12; Garfield Gordon / 16; Cavahn McKenzie / 21; Shevan Parks / 23	72
5	Trinidad and Tobago: Akeem Marshall / 22; Ashton Gill / 25; Jevon Joseph / 26; Joshua James / 27	100

=== Senior women's race (6 km) ===
Individual race
Rank	Athlete	Country	Time
1st place, gold medalist(s)	Kellyn Taylor	United States	20:09.46
2nd place, silver medalist(s)	Rachel Hannah	Canada	20:29.79
3rd place, bronze medalist(s)	Carrie Dimoff	United States	20:31.48
4	Jessica O'Connell	Canada	20:45.27
5	Stephanie Dinius	United States	20:50.87
6	María Mancedo	Dominican Republic	20:52.62
7	Corey Conner	United States	20:56.74
8	Maritza Arenas	Mexico	21:01.86
9	Sabrina Wilkie	Canada	21:19.37
10	Erin Burrett	Canada	21:22.80
11	Tonya Nero	Trinidad and Tobago	22:03.49
12	Leslie Sexton	Canada	22:38.42
13	Stephanie Barrett	Jamaica	23:24.77
14	Jenelle Nedd	Trinidad and Tobago	24:22.82
15	Danielle James	Jamaica	24:59.47
16	Dawnel Collymore	Trinidad and Tobago	25:42.99
17	Elia Nero	Trinidad and Tobago	27:22.35
—	Jodi Nesbitt	Canada	DNF

Teams
Rank	Team	Points
1st place, gold medalist(s)	United States: Kellyn Taylor / 1; Carrie Dimoff / 3; Stephanie Dinius / 5; Corey Conner / 7	16
2nd place, silver medalist(s)	Canada: Rachel Hannah / 2; Jessica O'Connell / 4; Sabrina Wilkie / 9; Erin Burrett / 10	25
3rd place, bronze medalist(s)	Trinidad and Tobago: Tonya Nero / 11; Jenelle Nedd / 14; Dawnel Collymore / 16; Elia Nero / 17	58

=== Junior (U20) women's race (4 km) ===
Individual race
Rank	Athlete	Country	Time
1st place, gold medalist(s)	Jaimie Phelan	Canada	13:38.93
2nd place, silver medalist(s)	Jillian Forsey	Canada	13:39.91
3rd place, bronze medalist(s)	Claire Smith	Canada	13:43.27
4	Sandie Raines	United States	13:44.20
5	Grace Tinky	United States	13:45.37
6	Maggie Schmaedick	United States	13:55.23
7	Sarah Disanza	United States	13:57.87
8	Arantza Hernández	Mexico	14:06.64
9	Kendra Foley	United States	14:07.01
10	Aurilla Wilson	Canada	14:25.50
11	Jessy Lacourse	Canada	14:31.68
12	Mayra Paloma Salas	Mexico	15:16.04
13	Keyshla Barreto	Puerto Rico	15:27.43
14	Carolyn Burgos	Puerto Rico	15:34.43
15	Roshae Burrell	Jamaica	15:41.68
16	Cristeliz Colon	Puerto Rico	15:58.12
17	Conangela Senior	Jamaica	15:59.79
18	Alondra Bosque	Puerto Rico	16:06.00
19	Chris-Ann Lewis	Jamaica	16:12.89
20	Monique McPherson	Jamaica	16:18.40
21	Lucymar García	Puerto Rico	16:24.73
22	Nicole Pagan	Puerto Rico	16:25.15
23	Aaliyah Mitchell	Trinidad and Tobago	16:29.35
24	Ophia Simmonds	Jamaica	16:31.57
25	Donicia Antoine	Trinidad and Tobago	16:46.04
26	Mikayla Ottley	Trinidad and Tobago	18:06.80
27	Thyla-Marie Scott	Trinidad and Tobago	20:24.04
28	Sherese Crichlow	Trinidad and Tobago	22:05.55

Teams
Rank	Team	Points
1st place, gold medalist(s)	Canada: Jaimie Phelan / 1; Jillian Forsey / 2; Claire Smith / 3; Aurilla Wilson / 10	16
2nd place, silver medalist(s)	United States: Sandie Raines / 4; Grace Tinky / 5; Maggie Schmaedick / 6; Sarah Disanza / 7	22
3rd place, bronze medalist(s)	Puerto Rico: Keyshla Barreto Cruz / 13; Carolyn Burgos Collazo / 14; Cristeliz Colon Santiago / 16; Alondra Bosque Toledo / 18	61
4	Jamaica: Roshae Burrell / 15; Conangela Senior / 17; Chris-Ann Lewis / 19; Monique McPherson / 20	71
5	Trinidad and Tobago: Aaliyah Mitchell / 23; Donicia Antoine / 25; Mikayla Ottley / 26; Thyla-Marie Scott / 27	101

== Medal table (unofficial) ==
* Host nation (Trinidad and Tobago)

Rank	Nation	Gold	Silver	Bronze	Total
1	United States	6	1	3	10
2	Canada	2	6	1	9
3	Mexico	0	1	0	1
4	Puerto Rico	0	0	2	2
5	Jamaica	0	0	1	1
5	Trinidad and Tobago	0	0	1	1
Totals (6 entries)		8	8	8	24

- Note: Totals include both individual and team medals, with medals in the team competition counting as one medal.

== Participation ==
According to an unofficial count, 103 athletes from 10 countries participated.

- Bahamas (2)
- Bermuda (4)
- Canada (22)
- Dominican Republic (1)
- Jamaica (17)
- Mexico (6)
- Puerto Rico (12)
- Trinidad and Tobago (20)
- United States (18)
- U.S. Virgin Islands (1)

== See also ==
- 2014 in athletics (track and field)
