= Sean McGorty =

American runner (born 1995)

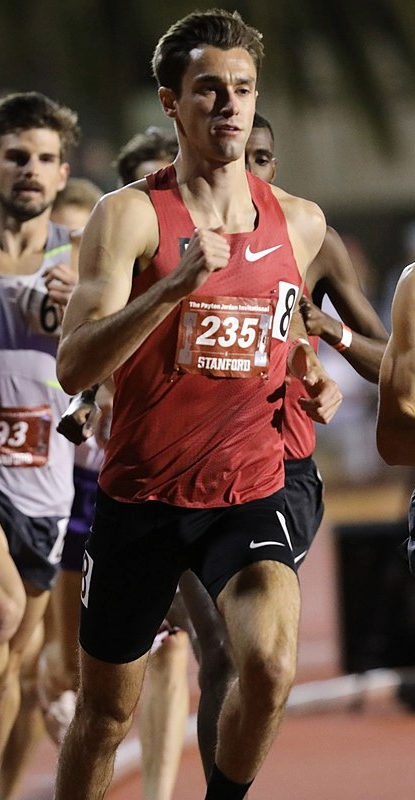
- McGorty in 2019 at the Payton Jordan Invitational

Personal information
- Nationality: American
- Born: March 8, 1995 (age 31) Fairfax, Virginia, U.S.
- Height: 6 ft 4 in (193 cm)
- Weight: 165 lb (75 kg)

Sport
- Sport: Track, cross country
- Events: 5000 meters, 10000 meters
- College team: Stanford
- Turned pro: 2018
- Coached by: Chris Miltenberg; 2013-2018; Jerry Schumacher; 2018-Present

Achievements and titles
- Personal bests: Outdoor; 1500 m: 3:36.61 (Kortrijk 2018); 3000 m: 7:32.79 (London 2024); 5000 m: 13:02.13 (Heusden-Zolder 2023); 10,000 m: 27:18.15 (San Juan Capistrano 2022); 3000 m steeplechase: 8:20.77 (Walnut 2021); Indoor; One mile: 3:53.95 (Seattle 2016); 3000 m: 7:51.16i (Boston 2020); 2 Miles: 8:33.41i (New York 2019); 5000 m: 13:09.21i (Boston 2022)
Medal record
Men's athletics
Representing United States
NACAC Championships in Athletics
Gold medal – first place	2022 Freeport	10,000 metres
NACAC Cross Country Championships
Gold medal – first place	2014 Mount Irvine	Junior men's 6K
- Updated on December 21, 2023

Sean McGorty (born March 8, 1995) is an American middle- and long-distance runner, who competes mainly in the 5000 meters and 10000 meters. He represented the United States in both events at the 2023 World Championships and in the 5000 m at the 2022 World Championships. McGorty is a two-time gold medalist at the NACAC Championships, having won the Junior Men's 6K in 2014 and the 10000 m in 2022.

In high school, McGorty performed well in state- and national-level competitions, including a second-place finish at the Foot Locker Cross Country Championships. He attended Stanford University from 2013 to 2018, where he won an NCAA title over 5000 m. After graduating, McGorty turned professional to compete for the Nike-sponsored Bowerman Track Club.

== Early life and youth sports ==
Sean McGorty grew up in Chantilly, Virginia in a family with a background in track and field. His parents met while competing in the sport for the University of North Carolina. His father was a decathlete who participated in the U.S. Olympic trials in 1988 and 1992. McGorty has two brothers who also pursued running: one competed for Stanford and the other for William and Mary.

McGorty attended Chantilly High School in Fairfax, Virginia. He was initially involved in soccer and basketball but switched to running after trying cross country in his freshman year. In his first season competing in cross country, he recorded a time of 16:26 in a 5 km race. Encouraged by his success, he moved on to indoor track. Describing his transition to running, McGorty stated in an interview, "When [indoor track] continued to go well, I decided to do outdoor track. After that spring season, I left my club soccer team and decided to run all year". He became a state champion in cross country, the 1600 meters, and the 3200 meters.

In his senior year in 2012, he placed second at the Foot Locker Cross Country Championships behind Edward Cheserek. At the 2013 New Balance Outdoor Nationals, he won the 2-mile race in a time of 8:45.61, the fastest ever for a Virginia high school boy. McGorty also set the high school boy's mile meet record at the 2013 Penn Relays with a time of 4:04.47. For college, he chose Stanford University among offers from several institutions, including Princeton and Georgetown.

== Collegiate competition ==
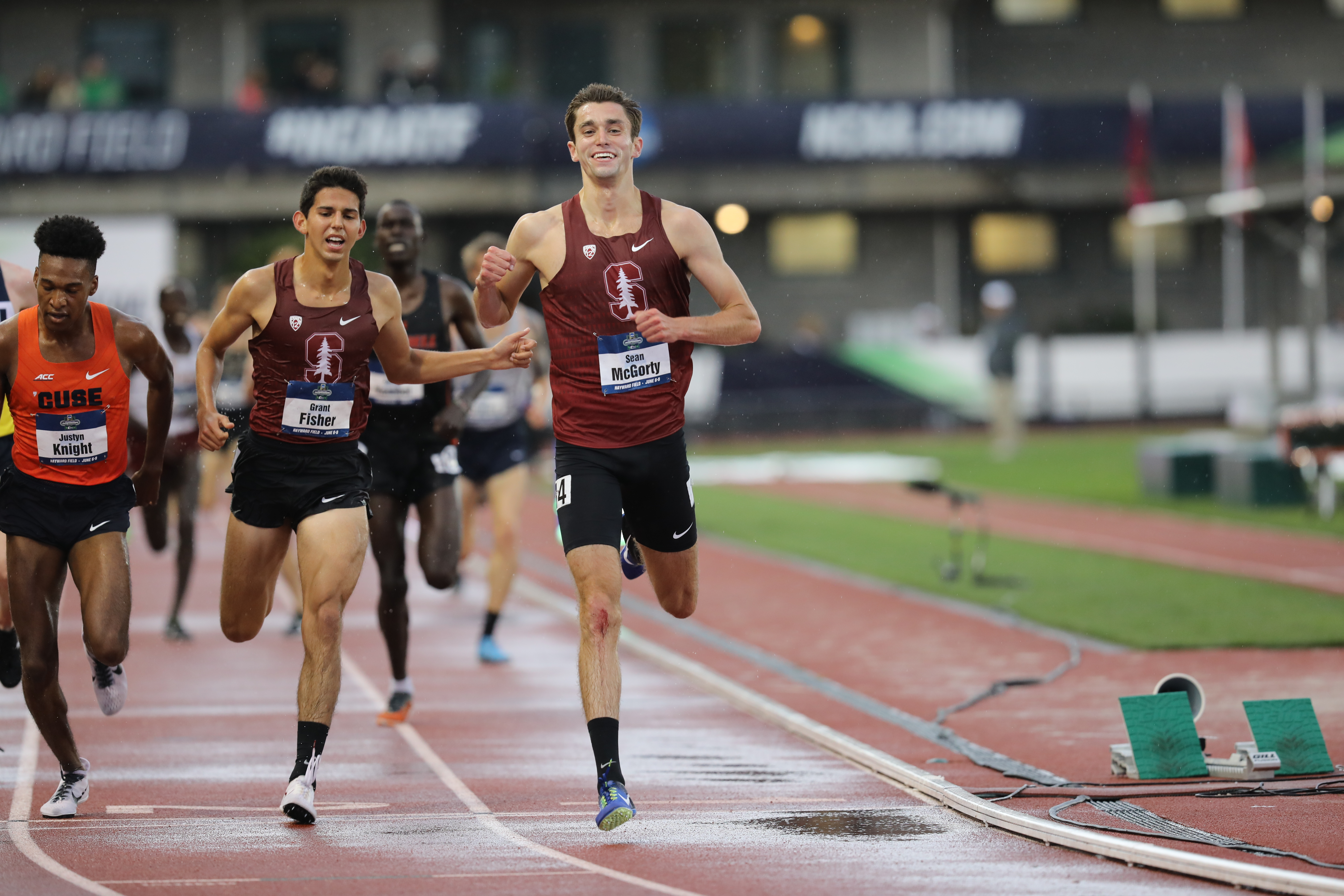
McGorty wins the 5000 meters at the 2018 NCAA Division I Outdoor Track and Field Championships.

While at Stanford University, McGorty won an NCAA title and recorded multiple All-American finishes. He competed in the NCAA Division I men's cross country championships four times, with a highest finish of seventh in 2015. While competing in track, McGorty had several top finishes in the mile. In January 2015, he ran the mile in 3:59.34, becoming the first collegiate runner to achieve a sub-four minute mile in 2015. In 2016, he improved his time in the indoor mile to 3:53.95, finished less than a second behind Izaic Yorks.

McGorty also specialized in the 5000 m. On May 1, 2016, he attained the qualifying standard in the event for the Olympics, with a personal best of 13:24.25 at the Payton Jordan Invitational. At the 2016 NCAA Outdoor Championships, he finished second behind Edward Cheserek in the 5000 m. McGorty improved to first place at the 2018 NCAA Outdoor Championships to win the NCAA title in the 5000 m in 13:54.81 by out kicking heavy favorite Justyn Knight, as well as the 2017 champion and Stanford teammate Grant Fisher. His university honors include being named NCAA Division I Male Indoor Track Scholar Athlete of the Year and Scholar-Athlete of the Year by the U.S. Track & Field and Cross Country Coaches Association.

== Senior competition ==
=== 2018- 2020 ===
On July 14, 2018, McGorty competed for the first time in Europe at the Guldensporenmeeting in Kortrijk, Belgium, where he won the 1500 meters in a personal best of 3:36.61. The following month, McGorty announced that he had joined the Bowerman Track Club, a Nike-sponsored group coached by Jerry Schumacher. In June 2019, McGorty experienced a severe pain in his foot during training. He was diagnosed with a Staphylococcal infection in his heel bone, leading to multiple surgeries throughout the year. McGorty made a successful recovery and resumed competing in February 2020. In June 2020, he set a personal best of 13:11.22 in the 5000 m.

=== 2021 ===
McGorty began competing in the 3000 meters steeplechase in May 2021, with the aim of qualifying in the event for the 2020 Summer Olympics. On May 9, in his first race at the distance, he recorded a time of 8:20.77, meeting the qualifying standard for the Olympics. This time was the fastest debut ever in the event by an American. During the 2020 US Olympic Trials, held in June 2021, McGorty stopped mid-race in a preliminary round to fix a loose shoe and lost about 10 seconds. Despite this, his time was fast enough to qualify for the final round. In the finals, he finished seventh, missing the top three needed to qualify for the Olympics. In a post-race interview, he expressed disappointment and attributed his performance to negative thinking, stating, "I let myself get out of the race mentally".

=== 2022 ===
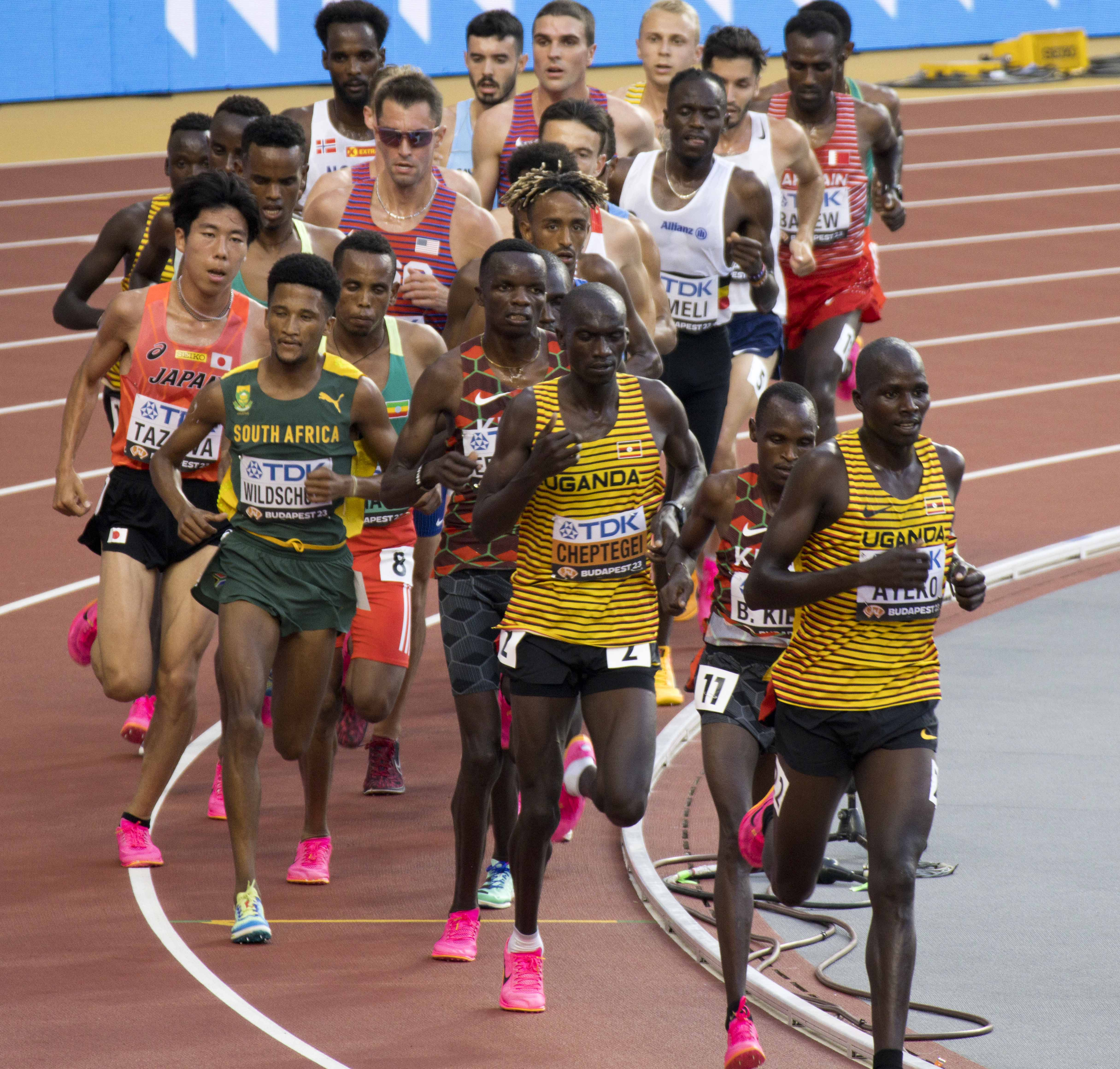
At the 10000m of the 2023 World Championships, Mcgorty is shown in red kit, to middle of the pack and left of center

On 27 May 2022, McGorty placed third place in the 10000 m at the 2022 USA Outdoor Track and Field Championships. This top-three finish qualified him for this event at the 2022 World Athletics Championships in Eugene, Oregon on July 17, 2022. At the World Championships, he finished 12th in 27:46.30. The following month, McGorty ran 3:36.67 for 1500 m and 3:54.51 for the mile. His final race of the year was at the NACAC Championships, where he won a gold medal in the 10000 m.

=== 2023 ===
At the 2023 USA Outdoor Track and Field Championships, McGorty placed third in both the 5000 m and 10000 m. While the USATF selects the top three finishers from each event for the world championships, McGorty had not initially met the qualifying standard of 13:13.50 in the 5000 m, which was a prerequisite for participating in the 2023 World Championships. However, he met the standard for the 5000 m on July 15, 2023 by running 13:02.13 at a meet in Heusden, Belgium. During the 2023 World Championships, McGorty finished 16th in the 10000 m and did not progress past the preliminary rounds in the 5000 m.

=== 2024 ===
At the US Olympic Trials, McGorty place sixth in the final of the 5000 m. It was his first race of the year after recovering from injury.

== Achievements ==
All information from athlete's profile on World Athletics.

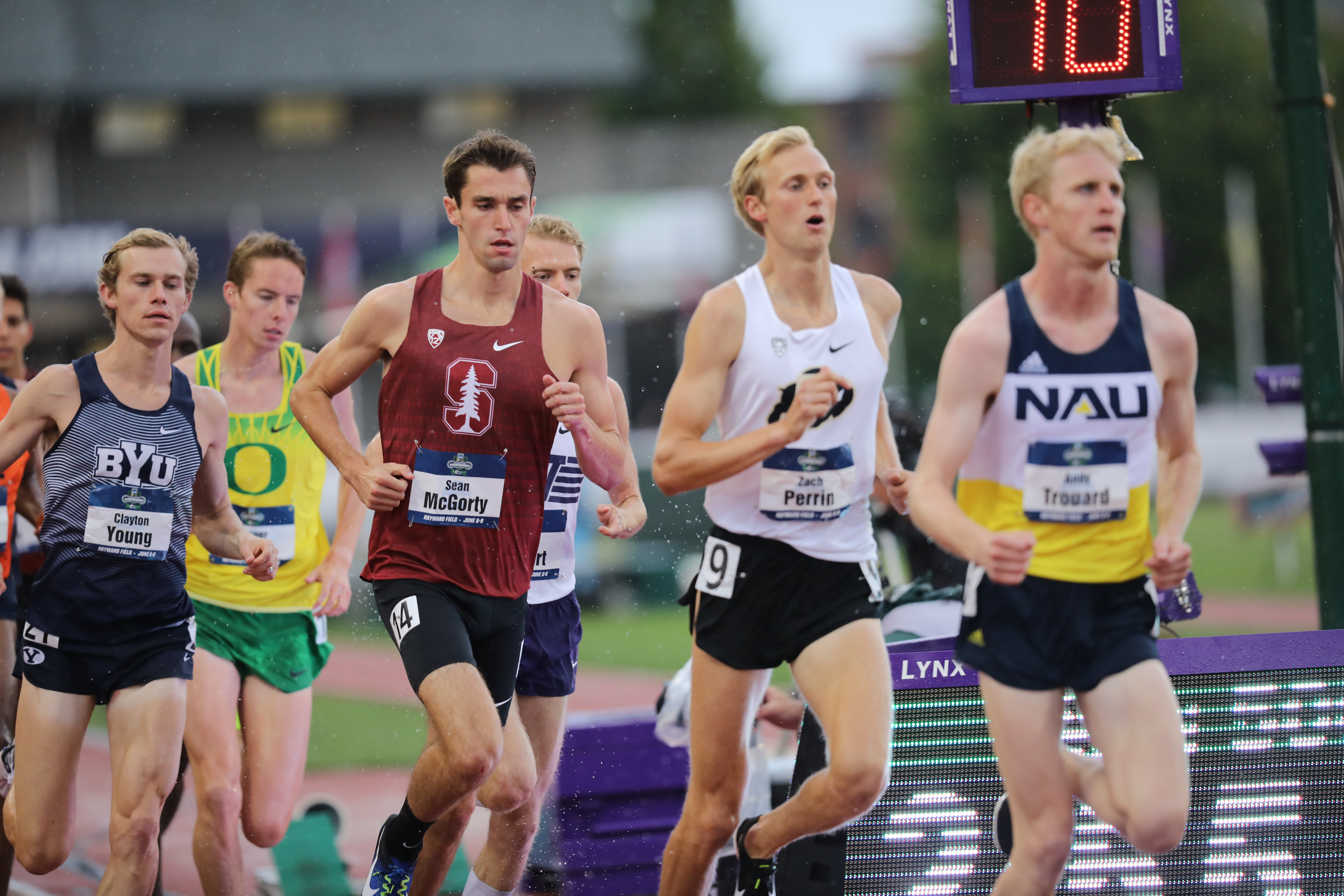
McGorty (left of center) in the 5000m.

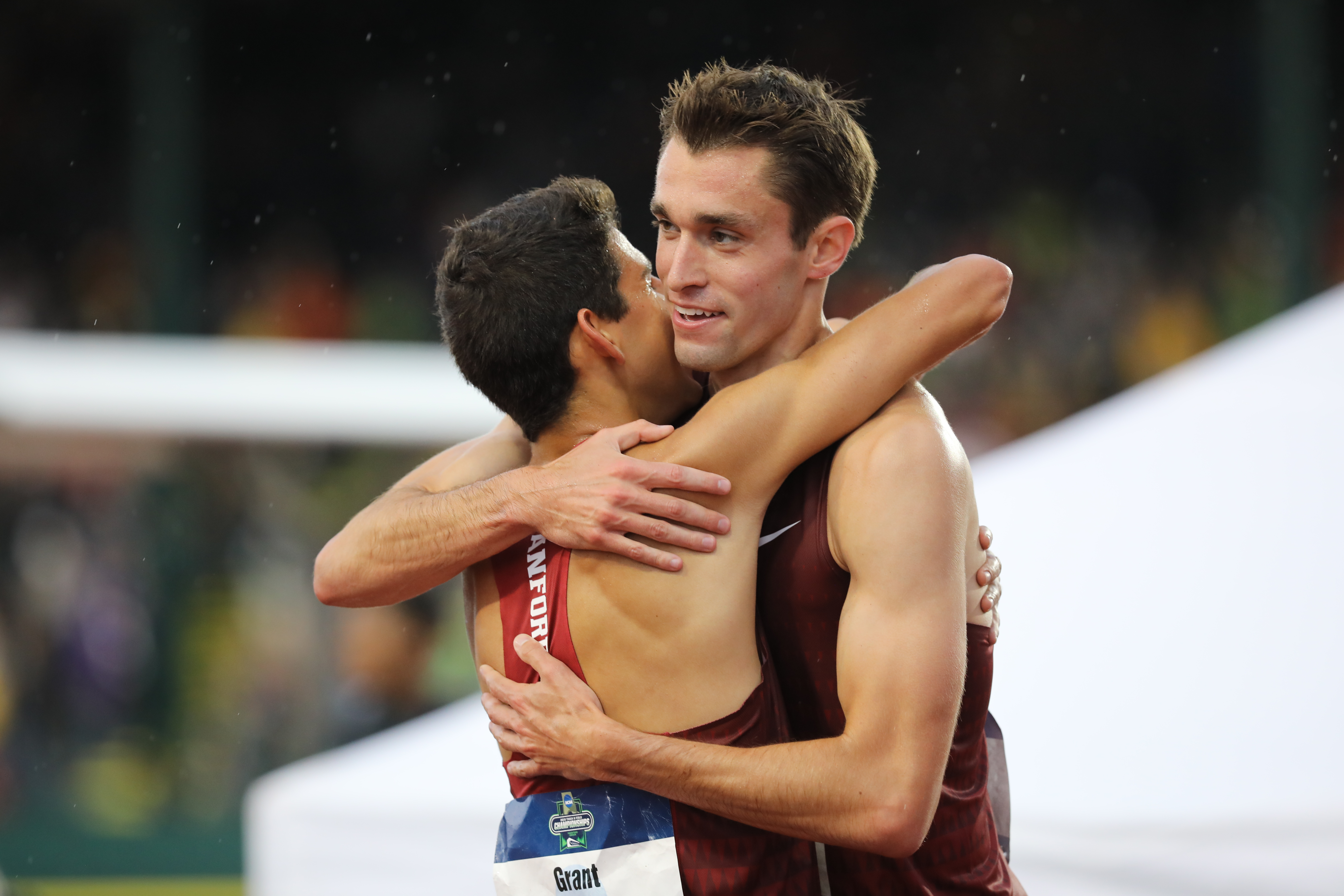
McGorty embraces teammate Grant Fisher after winning the race.

Sean McGorty at the 5000m of the 2018 NCAA Division I Outdoor Track and Field Championships.

=== Personal bests ===
Surface	Event	Time	Date	Venue
Outdoor track	600 meters	1:22.17	21 July 2020	Portland, OR (USA)
Outdoor track	800 meters	1:53.00	1 June 2013	Newport News, VA (USA)
Outdoor track	1500 meters	3:36.61	14 July 2018	Kortrijk, Belgium
Outdoor track	One Mile	3:54.51	5 August 2022	Raleigh, NC (USA)
Outdoor track	2000 meters	5:09.75	7 August 2020	Portland, OR (USA)
Outdoor track	3000 meters	7:37.47	6 February 2021	Phoenix, AZ (USA)
Outdoor track	Two Miles	8:45.61	15 June 2013	Greensboro, NC (USA)
Outdoor track	5000 meters	13:02.13	15 July 2023	Heusden-Zolder (Belgium)
Outdoor track	10,000 meters	27:18.15	6 March 2022	San Juan Capistrano, CA (USA)
Outdoor track	3000 meters Steeplechase	8:20.77	9 May 2021	Walnut, CA (USA)
Indoor track	1000 meters	2:32.75	13 January 2012	Lynchburg, VA (USA)
Indoor track	One Mile	4:13.81	11 March 2012	New York, NY (USA)
Indoor track	One Mile	3:53.95	27 February 2016	Seattle, WA (USA)
Indoor track	3000 meters	7:51.16	27 February 2020	Boston, MA (USA)
Indoor track	3000 meters	7:46.76	14 February 2020	Seattle, WA (USA)
Indoor track	Two Miles	8:33.41	23 February 2019	New York, NY (USA)
Indoor track	5000 meters	13:09.21	12 February 2022	Boston, MA (USA)

=== International competitions ===
Year	Competition	Venue	Position	Event	Time
Representing USA
2023	World Championships	Nemzeti Atlétikai Központ, Budapest, Hungary	28th (h)	5000 m	13:40.28
2023	World Championships	Nemzeti Atlétikai Központ, Budapest, Hungary	16th	10,000 m	28:27.54
2022	World Championships	Hayward Field, Eugene, Oregon, USA	12th	10,000 m	27:46.30
