= Athletics at the 2015 Pan American Games – Women's marathon =

Women's marathon at the 2015 Pan American Games
- Venue: Ontario Place West Channel
- Dates: July 18
- Competitors: 17 from 11 nations
- Winning time: 2:35:04

Medalists
Gold medal	Adriana Aparecida da Silva	Brazil
Silver medal	Lindsay Flanagan	United States
Bronze medal	Rachel Hannah	Canada

The women's marathon competition of the athletics events at the 2015 Pan American Games took place on the 18 of July on a temporary circuit around the Ontario Place West Channel. The defending Pan American Games champion is Adriana Aparecida da Silva of Brazil.

== Records ==
World record	Paula Radcliffe (GBR)	2:15:25	London, Great Britain	April 13, 2003
Pan American Games record	Adriana Aparecida da Silva (BRA)	2:36:37	Guadalajara, Mexico	October 23, 2011

== Qualification ==
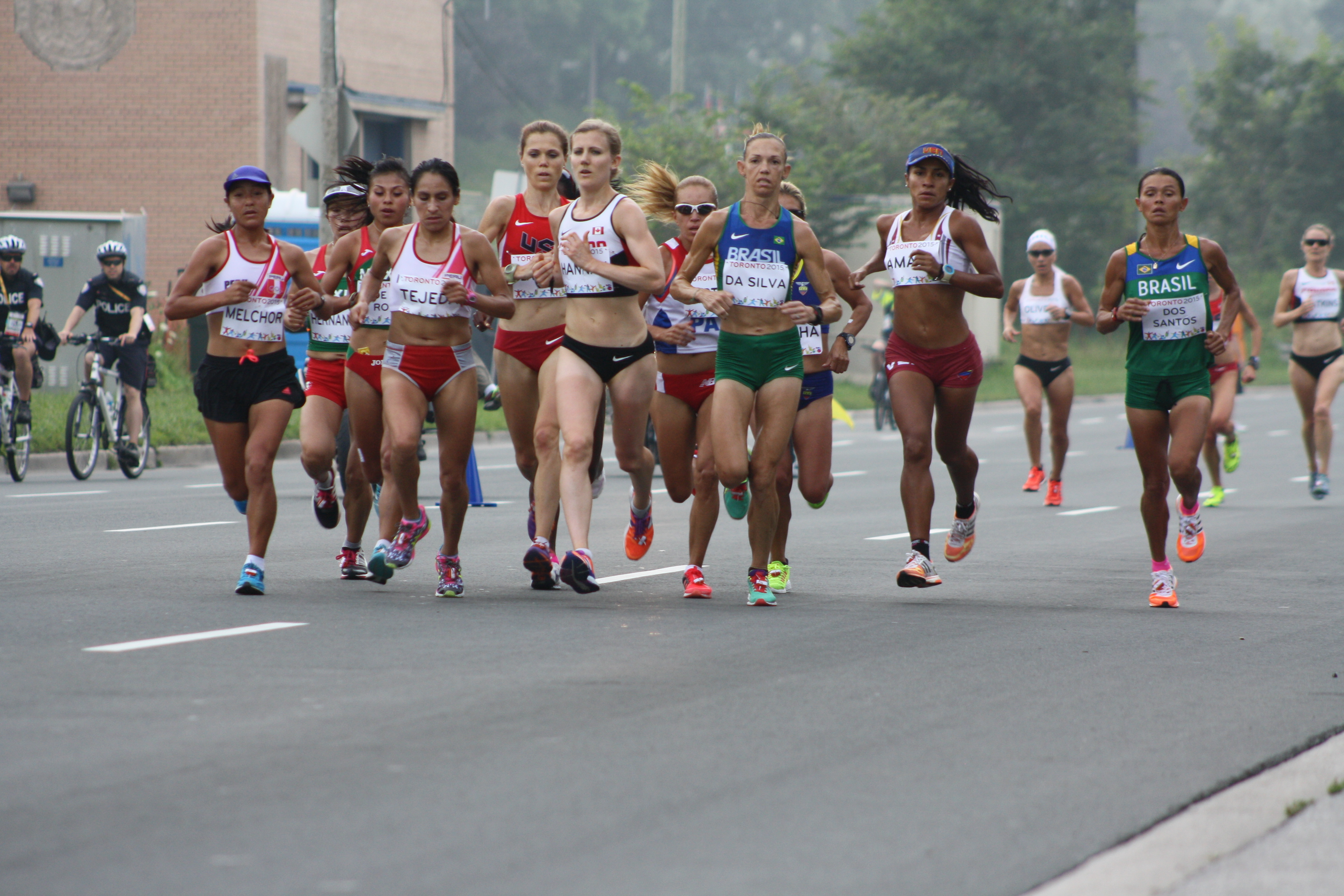
The lead pack in the Pan American Games women's marathon.

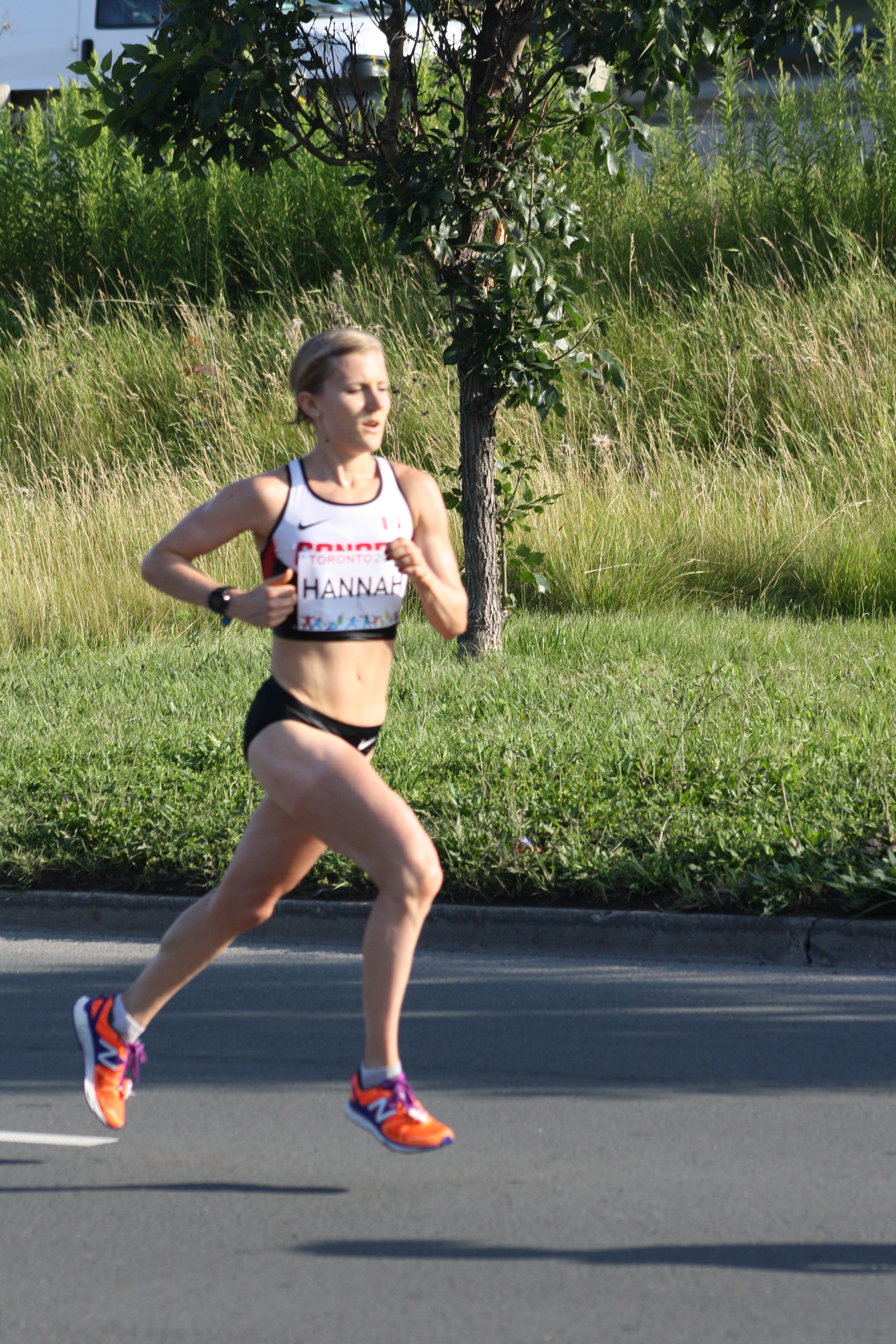
Rachel Hannah of Canada at the Pan American Games marathon.

Each National Olympic Committee (NOC) was able to enter up to two entrants providing they had met the minimum standard (2.55.00) in the qualifying period (January 1, 2014 to June 28, 2015).

== Schedule ==
Date	Time	Round
July 18, 2015	7:05	Final

== Abbreviations ==
- All times shown are in hours:minutes:seconds

KEY:	q	Fastest non-qualifiers	Q	Qualified	NR	National record	PB	Personal best	SB	Seasonal best	DQ	Disqualified

== Results ==
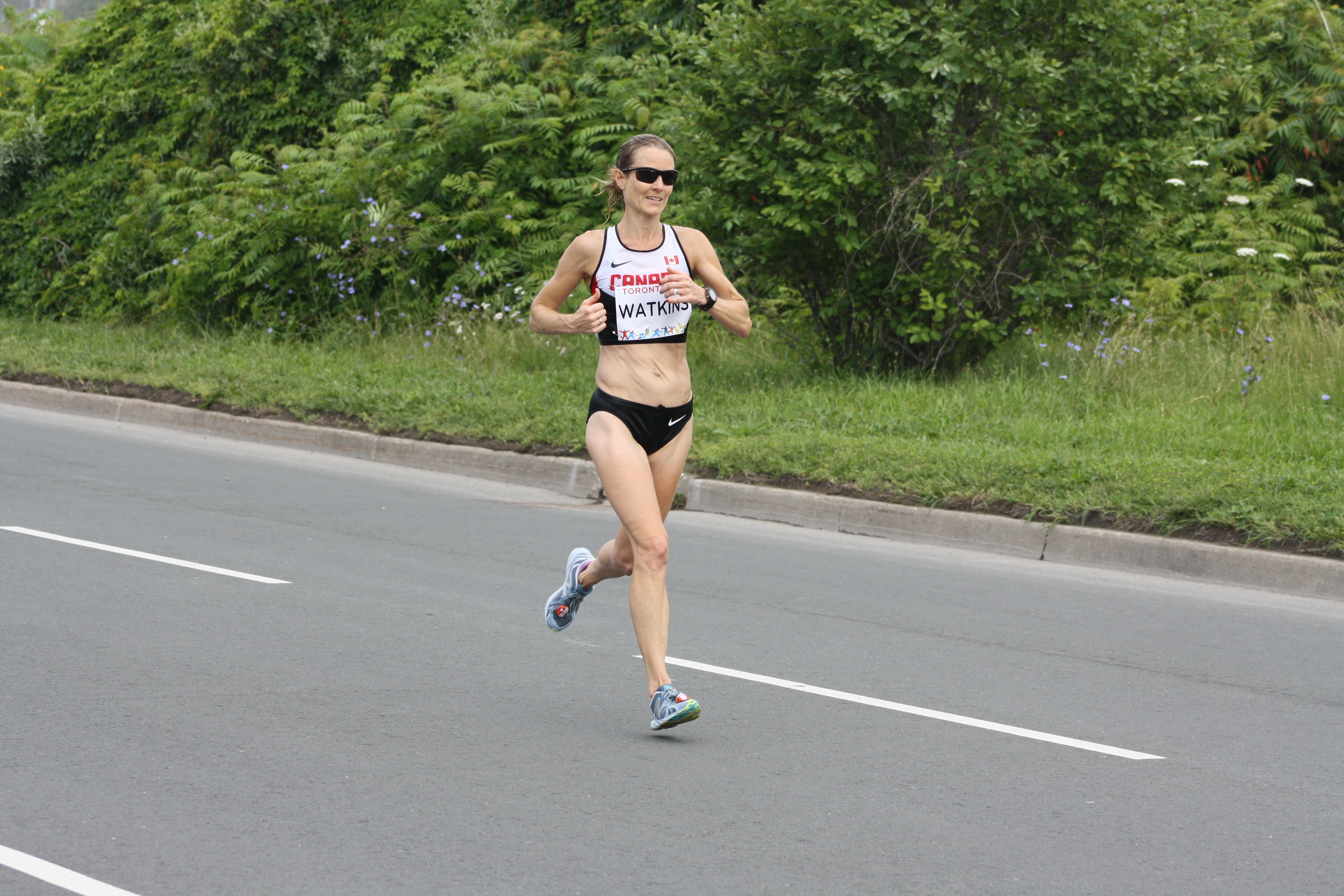
Catherine Watkins of Canada at the Pan American Games marathon.

=== Final ===
Rank	Athlete	Nation	Time	Notes
1st place, gold medalist(s)	Adriana Aparecida da Silva	Brazil	2:35:40	PR
2nd place, silver medalist(s)	Lindsay Flanagan	United States	2:36:30	
3rd place, bronze medalist(s)	Rachel Hannah	Canada	2:41:06	
4	Marily dos Santos	Brazil	2:41:31	
5	Margarita Hernandez	Mexico	2:41:57	
6	Rosa Chacha	Ecuador	2:42:47	
7	Zuleima Amaya	Venezuela	2:49:42	
8	Catherine Watkins	Canada	2:51:23	
9	Vianey de la Rosa	Mexico	2:51:42	
10	Érika Olivera	Chile	2:52:27	
	Leidy Tobon	Colombia	DNF	
	Sarah Cummings	United States	DNF	
	Dailín Belmonte	Cuba	DNF	
	Inés Melchor	Peru	DNF	
	Carmen Martinez	Paraguay	DNF	
	Natalia Romero	Chile	DNS	
	~~Gladys Tejeda~~	Peru	~~2:33:03~~	DQ
