= Mattie Suver =

American middle-distance runner

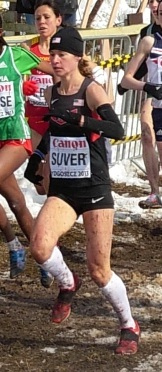
- Mattie Suver at the 2013 IAAF World Cross Country Championships

Personal information
- Nationality: American
- Born: Mattie Bridgmon; September 10, 1987 (age 38) Laramie, Wyoming
- Height: 5 ft 5 in (165 cm)

Sport
- Sport: Long-distance running
- Event: Marathon
- Club: Asics
- Team: University of Oregon Ducks
- Turned pro: 2010
- Coached by: Scott Simmons

Achievements and titles
- Personal best: 10,000 m: 31:54.43
Medal record
Women's athletics
Representing the United States

Mattie Suver (née Bridgmon born September 10, 1987) is an American middle-distance runner.

== College ==
Suver competed for the University of Oregon'10 and Eastern Washington University'08 where she was a five-time All-American.

== Professional ==
In 2012, Suver won the USATF National Club Cross Country Championships.

In 2013, Suver competed in the 2013 IAAF World Cross Country Championships where she finished 26th.

In 2014, Suver competed in the 2014 IAAF World Half Marathon Championships where she finished 36th.

In 2015, Suver competed in the 2015 IAAF World Cross Country Championships where she finished 34th.

In 2016, Suver won the USA Cross Country Championships. and placed 10th at Pan American Cross Country Cup / 13th NACAC Cross Country Championships in Caraballeda, Venezuela. Suver placed 10th in 54:48 in the 2016 USATF 15 km championships in Jacksonville, Florida.

Currently trains under Renato Canova and Scott Simmons in Colorado Springs, Colorado for American Distance Project.

== Highlights ==
PBs: 10k: 31:54.43 ('15); 1/2 Mar: 71:51 ('15)
- 2016 US Cross Country Championships Champion
- 2016 Bronze Medalist for Team USA at Great Edinburgh International Cross Country
- 2015 US Cross Country Championships Runner-Up
- 2015 USA 2015 IAAF World Cross Country Championships Team Member
- 2013 USA 2013 IAAF World Cross Country Championships Team Member
- 2013 Bronze Medalist for Team USA at BUPA Great Edinburgh International Cross Country
- 2013 US 20k Runner-Up - 2012 US Club Cross Country Champion
- 2012 US Marathon Olympic Trials
