= 2022 Pan American Cross Country Cup =

2022 Panamerican Cross Country Championships
- Organisers: Association of Panamerican Athletics
- Edition: 5th
- Date: March 27
- Host city: Serra, Espírito Santo (Brazil)
- Events: 4
- Distances: 10 km – Senior men 8 km – Junior men (U20); 8 km – Senior women 6 km – Junior women (U20)
- Participation: 44 nations
- Official website: https://panamxccup2022.com/

The 2022 Pan American Cross Country Cup took place on March 27, 2022, in Serra, Brazil.

== Medalists ==
Event	Gold		Silver		Bronze	
Individual
Senior men (10 km)	Wendell Jeronimo Souza; Brazil	32:03	Rene Champi; Peru	32:07	Marciel Miranda de Almeida Silva; Brazil	32:17
Junior (U20) men (8 km)	Janio Marcos Goncalves Varjao; Brazil	26:19	Jhoseph Nunez; Peru	28:15	Diego Caldeira; Venezuela	28:25
Senior women (10 km)	Maria Lucineida da Silva Moreira; Brazil	36:21	Nubia de Oliveira Silva; Brazil	36:48	Simone Ponte Ferraz; Brazil	36:51
Junior (U20) women (6 km)	Gabriela de Freitas Tardivo; Brazil	23:05	Aylana Ferreira Cezar; Brazil	23:27	Veronica Huacasi; Peru	23:28
Team
Senior men	Brazil		Peru		Uruguay	
Senior women	Brazil		Peru		Uruguay	

== Race results ==
=== Senior men's race (10 km) ===
Individual race
Rank	Athlete	Country	Time
1st place, gold medalist(s)	Wendell Geronimo SOUZA	(Brazil)	31:46
2nd place, silver medalist(s)	Thomas FAFARD	(Canada)	32:03
3rd place, bronze medalist(s)	Rene CHAMPI	(Peru)	32:07
4	Marciel MIRANDA	(Brazil)	32:17
5	Everton SILVA	(Brazil)	32:23
6	Thomas NOBBS	(Canada)	32:25
7	Philippe PARROT-MIGAS	(Canada)	32:26
8	Nelson ITO OCURO	(Peru)	32:29
9	Connor BLACK	(Canada)	32:34
10	Joshua DE SOUZA	(Canada)	32:38
11	Sávio DE PAULA	(Brazil)	32:48
12	Elvis CONDE	(Peru)	32:56
13	Saul ACOSTA	(Mexico)	33:02
14	Mike TATE	(Canada)	33:34
15	Ernesto Andrés ZAMORA	(Uruguay)	33:41
16	Walter NINA	(Peru)	34:05
17	Robert DEL VALLE	(Mexico)	35:08
18	Victor Alfredo MONTAÑEZ MARTINEZ	(Mexico)	35:48
19	Mario LÓPEZ	(Mexico)	36:37
20	Gilmar Silvestre LOPES	(Brazil)	DNF

=== Senior women's race (10 km) ===
Individual race
Rank	Athlete	Country	Time
1st place, gold medalist(s)	Maria Lucineida DA SILVA	(Brazil)	36:21
2nd place, silver medalist(s)	Nubia DE OLIVEIRA SILVA	(Brazil)	36:48
3rd place, bronze medalist(s)	Simone FERRAZ	(Brazil)	36:51
4	Nicole MELLO	(Brazil)	36:58
5	Jessy LACOURSE	(Canada)	37:23
6	Rina CJURO	(Peru)	37:28
7	Catherine BEAUCHEMIN	(Canada)	37:34
8	Alexandra LUCKI	(Canada)	37:52
9	Dina VELASQUEZ	(Peru)	38:03
10	Lindsay CARSON	(Canada)	38:07
11	Jade BÉRUBÉ	(Canada)	38:08
12	Elisa HERNANDEZ	(Mexico)	38:10
13	Helen SPADARI	(Brazil)	38:34
14	Amanda Aparecida DE OLIVEIRA	(Brazil)	38:55
15	Lorena SOSA	(Uruguay)	39:20
16	Ally GINTHER	(Canada)	39:36
17	Virginia HUATORONGO	(Brazil)	40:00
18	Ilse MARQUEZ QUIJANO	(Mexico)	40:46
19	María d Jesús RUIZ	(Mexico)	DNF

== Medal table (unofficial) ==
* Host nation (Brazil)

Rank	Nation	Gold	Silver	Bronze	Total
1	Brazil*	0	0	0	0
1	Canada	0	0	0	0
1	Colombia	0	0	0	0
1	Ecuador	0	0	0	0
1	Honduras	0	0	0	0
1	Peru	0	0	0	0
1	United States	0	0	0	0
Totals (7 entries)		0	0	0	0

- Note: Totals include both individual and team medals, with medals in the team competition counting as one medal.

== Participation ==
According to an unofficial count, athletes from 44 countries participated.

- Anguilla (0)
- Antigua and Barbuda (0)
- Argentina (0)
- Aruba (0)
- Bahamas (0)
- Barbados (0)
- Belize (0)
- Bermuda (0)
- Bolivia (0)
- Brazil (12)
- British Virgin Islands (0)
- Canada (12)
- Cayman Islands (0)
- Chile (0)
- Colombia (0)
- Costa Rica (0)
- Cuba (0)
- Dominica (0)
- Dominican Republic (0)
- Ecuador (0)
- El Salvador (0)
- Grenada (0)
- Guatemala (0)
- Guyana (0)
- Haiti (0)
- Honduras (0)
- Jamaica (0)
- Mexico (7)
- Montserrat (0)
- Nicaragua (0)
- Panama (0)
- Paraguay (0)
- Peru (6)
- Puerto Rico (0)
- Saint Kitts and Nevis (0)
- Saint Lucia (0)
- Saint Vincent and the Grenadines (0)
- Suriname (0)
- Turks and Caicos Islands (0)
- Trinidad and Tobago (0)
- United States (0)
- U.S. Virgin Islands (0)
- Uruguay (2)
- Venezuela (0)

== See also ==
- 2022 in athletics (track and field)
- results World Athletics
