= Athletics at the 2015 Pan American Games – Women's 5000 metres =

Women's 5000 metres at the 2015 Pan American Games
- Venue: CIBC Pan Am and Parapan Am Athletics Stadium
- Dates: July 21
- Competitors: 13 from 8 nations
- Winning time: 15:45.97

Medalists
Gold medal	Juliana Paula dos Santos	Brazil
Silver medal	Brenda Flores	Mexico
Bronze medal	Kellyn Taylor	United States

The women's 5000 metres sprint competition of the athletics events at the 2015 Pan American Games took place on July 21 at the CIBC Pan Am and Parapan Am Athletics Stadium in Toronto, Canada. The defending Pan American Games champion is Marisol Romero of Mexico.

== Records ==
Prior to this competition, the existing world and Pan American Games records were as follows:

World record	Tirunesh Dibaba (ETH)	14:11.15	Oslo, Norway	June 6, 2008
Pan American Games record	Adriana Fernandez (MEX)	15:30.65	Santo Domingo, Dominican Republic	August 6, 2003

== Qualification ==
Each National Olympic Committee (NOC) was able to enter up to two entrants providing they had met the minimum standard (16.43.00) in the qualifying period (January 1, 2014 to June 28, 2015).

== Schedule ==
Date	Time	Round
July 21, 2015	10:10	Final

== Results ==
All times shown are in seconds.

KEY:	q	Fastest non-qualifiers	Q	Qualified	NR	National record	PB	Personal best	SB	Seasonal best	DQ	Disqualified

=== Final ===
Wind:

Rank	Name	Nationality	Time	Notes
1st place, gold medalist(s)	Juliana Paula dos Santos	Brazil	15:45.97	PB
2nd place, silver medalist(s)	Brenda Flores	Mexico	15:47.19	
3rd place, bronze medalist(s)	Kellyn Taylor	United States	15:52.78	
4	Yudileyvis Castillo	Cuba	15:59.44	PB
5	Alisha Williams	United States	16:01.59	
6	María Pastuña	Ecuador	16:06.63	
7	Jessica O'Connell	Canada	16:08.41	
8	Natasha Labeaud	Canada	16:17.40	
9	Carolina Tabares	Colombia	16:17.62	
10	Tatiele de Carvalho	Brazil	16:27.09	
11	Jovana de la Cruz	Peru	16:31.94	
12	Jessica Paguay	Ecuador	17:07.41	
13	Soledad Torre	Peru	17:11.83	
