= Gladys Tejeda =

Peruvian long-distance runner

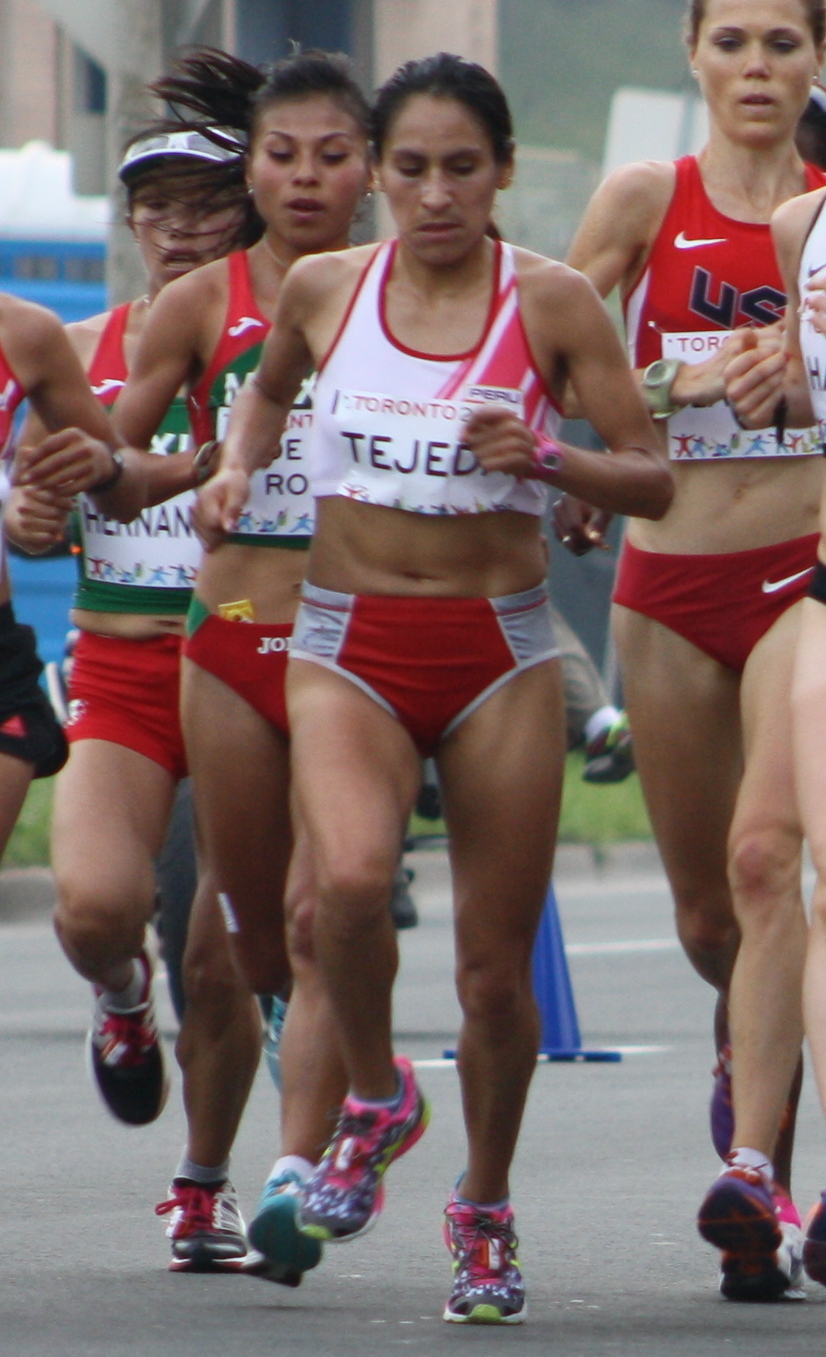
- Gladys Tejeda at 2015 Pan American Games

Personal information
- Full name: Gladys Lucy Tejeda Pucuhuaranga
- Born: 30 September 1985 (age 40) Jauja, Junín, Peru
- Height: 1.55 m (5 ft 1 in)
- Weight: 46 kg (101 lb)

Sport
- Sport: Athletics
- Event: Distance running
Medal record
Women's athletics
Representing Peru
Pan American Games
Gold medal – first place	2019 Lima	Marathon
Bronze medal – third place	2011 Guadalajara	Marathon
Bronze medal – third place	2023 Santiago	Marathon
Disqualified	2015 Toronto	Marathon
Pan American Cross Country Cup
Gold medal – first place	2015 Barranquilla	7000 m
Bronze medal – third place	2015 Barranquilla	Team - 7km
South American Championships in Athletics
Silver medal – second place	2013 Cartagena	5000 m
South American Half Marathon Championships
Silver medal – second place	2010 Lima	Half marathon
Bolivarian Games
Gold medal – first place	2013 Trujillo	Half marathon
Silver medal – second place	2024 Ayacucho	8 km
- Updated on 22 July 2015

Gladys Lucy Tejeda Pucuhuaranga (born 30 September 1985) is a Peruvian long-distance runner who has represented Peru in various international competitions, including the Olympics and the Pan American Games.

== Career ==
In 2011, Tejeda secured a third-place finish at the Pan American Games in Guadalajara. She competed in the women's marathon at the 2012 Summer Olympics, where she was also chosen as Peru's flag bearer for the Parade of Nations.

In 2013, Tejeda claimed victory in the XXXI edition of the Mexico City Marathon, completing the race with a time of 2:37:35.

At the 2015 Pan American Games, Tejeda won the gold medal in the marathon, setting a new Pan American record with a time of 2:33:05. However, later that year, she was stripped of her medal after testing positive for furosemide, a diuretic included in the World Anti-Doping Agency's banned substances list for its potential use in masking other drugs. Despite her denial of doping, Tejeda was temporarily suspended from international competition.

Tejeda returned to competition at the 2016 Rio de Janeiro Olympics, finishing 15th in the women's marathon with a time of 2:29:55. In 2017, she won the XXXV edition of the Mexico City Marathon again, setting a women's course record with a time of 2:36:16. Tejeda achieved further success by winning a gold medal in the marathon event at the 2019 Pan American Games.

== Personal bests ==
- 5000 m: 16:00.91 min – Lima, Peru, 15 June 2013
- 10,000 m: 33:01.99 min – Stanford, United States, 4 May 2014
- Half marathon: 1:10:14 hrs – Cardiff, United Kingdom, 26 March 2016
- Marathon: 2:28:12 hrs – Rotterdam, Netherlands, 12 April 2015

== Achievements ==
Year	Competition	Venue	Position	Event	Notes
Representing Peru
2010	South American Half Marathon Championships	Lima, Peru	2nd	Half marathon	1:13:53
2010	World Half Marathon Championships	Nanning, China	21st	Half marathon	1:13:46
2011	Pan American Games	Guadalajara, Mexico	3rd	Marathon	2:42:09
2012	Olympic Games	London, United Kingdom	43rd	Marathon	2:32:07
2013	South American Championships	Cartagena, Colombia	2nd	5000 m	16:19.39
2013	Bolivarian Games	Trujillo, Peru	1st	Half marathon	1:12:53
2014	World Half Marathon Championships	Copenhagen, Denmark	26th	Half marathon	1:11:24
2015	Pan American Cross Country Cup	Barranquilla, Colombia	1st	7 km	21:18
2015	Pan American Cross Country Cup	Barranquilla, Colombia	3rd	Team - 7 km	51 pts
2015	World Cross Country Championships	Guiyang, China	21st	8 km	28:22
2015	World Cross Country Championships	Guiyang, China	8th	Team	156 pts
2016	World Half Marathon Championships	Cardiff, United Kingdom	9th	Half marathon	1:10:14
2016	Olympic Games	Rio de Janeiro, Brazil	15th	Marathon	2:29:55
2017	Bolivarian Games	Santa Marta, Colombia	1st	Half marathon	1:14:55
2021	Olympic Games	Sapporo, Japan	27th	Marathon	2:34:21
2022	Bolivarian Games	Valledupar, Colombia	1st	Half marathon	1:15:14
2023	Pan American Games	Santiago, Chile	3rd	Marathon	2:30:39
2026	Ibero-American Championships	Lima, Peru	5th	10,000 m	34:03.18
2026	Pan American Championships	Medellín, Colombia	4th	10,000 m	34:47.73
2026	South American Games	Santa Fe, Argentina	5th	10,000 m	33:35.71

== See also ==
- List of doping cases in athletics

Olympic Games
Preceded by Roberto Carcelen	Flag bearer for Peru; London 2012	Succeeded by Roberto Carcelen
