= Kellyn Taylor =

American long-distance runner

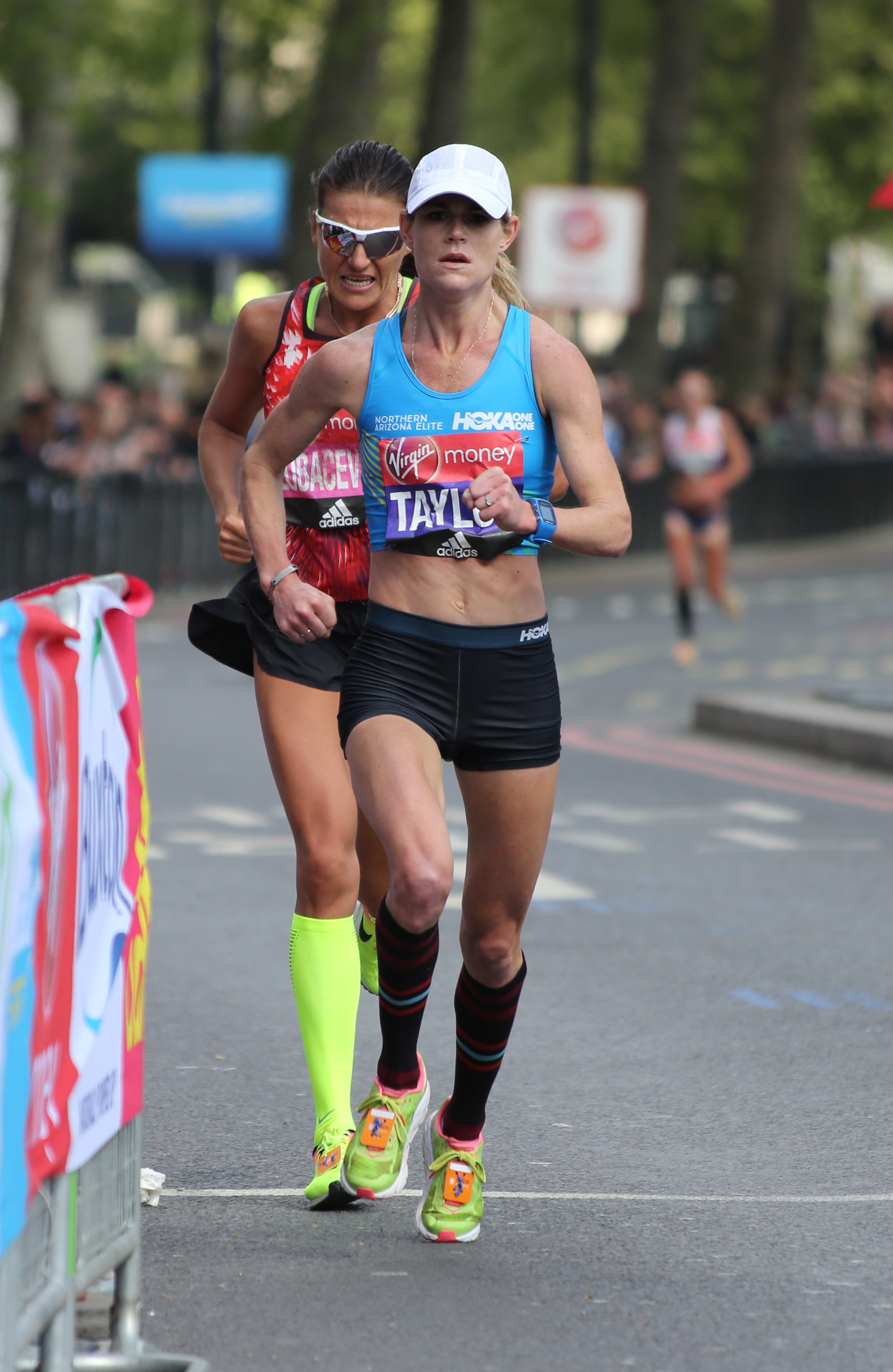
- Taylor at the 2017 London Marathon

Personal information
- Born: Kellyn Johnson; July 22, 1986 (age 40) Sussex, Wisconsin, US

Sport
- Sport: Long-distance running
- Events: 5000 meters, Marathon
- Club: Hoka One One Northern Arizona Elite
- Team: Wichita State Shockers
- Turned pro: 2009
Medal record
Women's athletics
Representing the United States
Pan American Games
Bronze medal – third place	2015 Toronto	5000 m
Pan American Cross Country Cup
Gold medal – first place	2015 Barranquilla	Senior women team
Silver medal – second place	2015 Barranquilla	Senior women
NACAC Championships in Athletics
Gold medal – first place	2015 San José	5000 m
NACAC Cross Country Championships
Gold medal – first place	2014 Mount Irvine	Senior Women's 6K

Kellyn Taylor (née Johnson; born July 22, 1986) is an American long distance runner.

== High school ==
Kellyn graduated from Sussex Hamilton High School in Wisconsin where she was a state 1600 meter champion as a senior. Kellyn earned District Runner of the Year honors and was a four-year Wisconsin Interscholastic Athletic Association state qualifier in both cross country and track. Kellyn lettered in cross country, basketball, and track.

== NCAA ==
In 2009, she finished 3rd at the NCAA indoor championships in the mile for the Wichita State Shockers.

Johnson, a 2006 graduate from Cloud County, is an aspiring Olympian and was a perennial All-American during her college career as a cross country and track athlete in Concordia for the Cloud County Thunderbirds for the Cloud County Community College and at Wichita State University. "She had an outstanding career when she was here. She ran everything from the 4X400 relay clear up the longest distance races like the 5,000-meter," said Cloud County head women's track coach, Ted Schmitz. "She was a driven athlete that hated to lose. She'd do anything to win a race. I hope our kids take away that hard work gets you places. Sometimes you might have to face adversity, but if you have a goal you need to stay with it and pursue your dream." Taylor, who met her husband Kyle Taylor while in Concordia, still owns the school records at Cloud County in the indoor distance medley relay (12:38.22), 1,000-meter run (2:57.9), mile run (4:59.5), and outdoor 3,000-meter steeplechase (11:25.9).

Her success continued at Wichita State where Taylor finished third at the 2009 indoor NCAA Championships in the mile, and 10th in the 5000-meter outdoor championships.

Representing Wichita State University
School Year	Missouri Valley Conference Cross Country Championship	NCAA Cross Country Championship	Missouri Valley Conference Indoor Track Championship	NCAA Indoor Track Championship	Missouri Valley Conference Outdoor Track Championship	NCAA Outdoor Track Championship
2009 Senior			3000 Meters, 1st, 9:24.33; 5000 Meters, 1st, 16:11.77	Mile, 3rd, 4:34.41	1500 Meters, 1st, 4:20.82; 5000 Meters, 1st, 16:32.56	5000 m, 10th, 16:45.34
2008 Junior	1st		5000m 1st, 17:06.99			
2008 Junior	1st		3000m 2nd, 9:53.57			
2008 Junior	1st		Mile, 3rd, 4:55.42			
2007 Sophomore					5000m 1st, 16:51.32	5000m 26th, 16:45.82
2007 Sophomore					1500m 1st, 4:30.00	
Representing Cloud County Community College
School Year	Cross Country Championship	NJCAA Cross Country Championship	Indoor Track Championship	NJCAA Indoor Track Championship	Outdoor Track Championship	NJCAA Outdoor Track Championship
2006 Freshman						3000 M steeplechase 2nd, 11:26.55
2005 Freshman				Mile 2nd, 5:07.23		

== Professional ==
In 2012, Kellyn finished 10th at 10,000 meters and 14th at 5,000 meters at the US Olympic Trials.

In 2014, Taylor won a national title at the 25 km distance.

At the 2015 Pan American Games she finished 3rd in the 5000 meters.

Also in 2015, she took second at the 2015 Pan American Cross Country Cup and first at the 2015 NACAC Championships in Athletics in the 5000 meters. Kellyn placed 3rd in 2015 Toronto Pan Am Track and Field Championships in 5000 meters in 15:52.78.

Kellyn placed 6th in Los Angeles at She competed at the 2016 US Olympic Marathon Trials. 2016 IAAF World Half Marathon Championships placing 25th in 1:12:42.

Kellyn Taylor placed fourth in 10,000 m behind Molly Huddle, Emily Infeld, and Marielle Hall at 2016 United States Olympic Trials (track and field) and was an alternate to represent United States at Athletics at the 2016 Summer Olympics.

In late 2016, Taylor trained and passed Firefighter Level I and II courses to qualify to Firefighting in the United States instead of racing a Fall marathon.

Kellyn Taylor placed thirteenth in 2017 London Marathon in 2:28:51.

She won the 2018 Grandma's Marathon in 2:24:28, setting a course record in the process. Kellyn Taylor's time made her the 7th fastest marathoner in US women’s history.

Taylor ran in the 2020 U.S. Woman's Olympic Trials Marathon February 29 in Atlanta, Georgia. She stayed in a lead pack for more than half the race, but Aliphine Tuliamuk and Molly Seidel pulled away and went first and second, respectively. Sally Kipyego was the third to make the team. Taylor finished 8th at 2:29:55.

After the COVID-19 pandemic put a year hold on the U.S. Olympic Trials for track and field, Taylor was able to enter the 10,000 meter at the field in Eugene, Oregon in June. The summer was one of the hottest ever experienced on the West Coast, and on a hot track, Taylor held pace with the leaders, but couldn't stay up front as Emily Sisson stretched out the pack. Taylor finished 12th of 44 runners in 32:42.

As of 2025, Taylor will no longer be part of Northern Arizona Elite or be sponsored by Hoka One One.

Year	Competition	Venue	Position	Event	Notes
2009	USA Outdoor Track Championships	Eugene, Oregon	13th	1500 metres	4:16.71
2011	USA Outdoor Track Championships	Eugene, Oregon	14th	5000 metres	16:07.18
2012	2012 United States Olympic Trials (track and field)	Eugene, Oregon	14th	5000 metres	15:39.60
2013	Lilac Bloomsday Run; Bloomsday 12 km	Spokane, Washington	5th	12 km	40:42
2013	Cherry Blossom Ten Mile Run	Washington, D.C.	3rd	Ten Mile Road Race	54:19
2013	USA Outdoor Track Championships	Des Moines, Iowa	10th	5000 metres	16:05.48
2014	USA Cross Country Championships	Indianapolis, Indiana	4th	8000 meters	28:13
2014	2014 NACAC Cross Country Championships	Mount Irvine Bay Golf Club; Trinidad and Tobago	1st	6 km	20:09
2014	USA 25 km Championships	Grand Rapids, Michigan	1st	25 km	1:25:26
2014	USA Outdoor Track Championships	Sacramento State University	5th	5000 metres	15:25.63
2015	Houston Marathon	Houston texas	6th	Marathon	2:28:40
2015	USATF 15 km championship Gate River Run	Jacksonville, Florida	10th	15 km	52:20
2015	USA Outdoor Track Championships	Eugene, Oregon	7th	5000 metres	15:32.04
2015	Pan American Games	Toronto	3rd	5000 metres	15:52.78
2015	NACAC Championships	San José, Costa Rica	1st	5000 metres	16:24.86
2015	USATF 10 mile championship	St. Paul, Minn.	7th	10 miles	54:37
2016	US Marathon Olympic Trials	Los Angeles	6th	Marathon	2:32:56
2016	World Half Marathon Championships	Cardiff	25th	Half marathon	1:12:42
2016	US Track Olympic Trials	Eugene, Oregon	12th	5000 metres	15:43.35
2016	US Track Olympic Trials	Eugene, Oregon	4th	10,000 metres	32:11.29
2017	Houston Half Marathon	Houston texas	12th	Half marathon	1:13:13
2017	London Marathon	London, England	13th	Marathon	2:28:51
2017	New York Marathon	New York, New York	8th	Marathon	2:29:56
2018	Boston Marathon	Boston, Massachusetts	DNF	Marathon	
2018	Grandma's Marathon	Duluth, Minnesota	1st	Marathon	2:24:29 (PB)
2018	Rock 'n' Roll Las Vegas Marathon	Las Vegas, Nevada	1st	Half Marathon	1:10:16
2019	NYC Half Marathon	New York, New York	8th	Half Marathon	1:12:43
2019	Prague Marathon	Prague, Czech Republic	4th	Marathon	2:26:27
2019	USA Outdoor Track Championships	Des Moines, Iowa	10th	5000 metres	15:32.19
2019	USA Outdoor Track Championships	Des Moines, Iowa	3rd	10,000 metres	32:02.74
2020	US Marathon Olympic Trials	Atlanta, Georgia	8th	Marathon	2:29:55
2021	New York Marathon	New York, New York	6th	Marathon	2:26:10
