= Fernando Cervantes =

Fernando Cervantes is a Mexican historian and author. He is Reader in History at the University of Bristol.

He is a Lay Dominican.

== Books ==
- The Devil in the New World: The Impact of Diabolism in New Spain (Yale University Press, 1994)
- Spiritual Encounters: Interactions between Christianity and Native Religions (1999)
- The Hispanic World in the Historical Imagination (2005)
- The Inquisition (2006)
- Angels, Demons and the New World (Cambridge University Press, 2013)
- Conquistadores: A New History of Spanish Discovery and Conquest (Allen Lane/Penguin 2020 | Viking, 2021)
  - French translation (Les Conquistadors) 2022 and 2025
  - Russian translation (Конкистадоры: Новая история открытия и завоевания Америки) 2024
