= Carrie Dimoff =

American long-distance runner

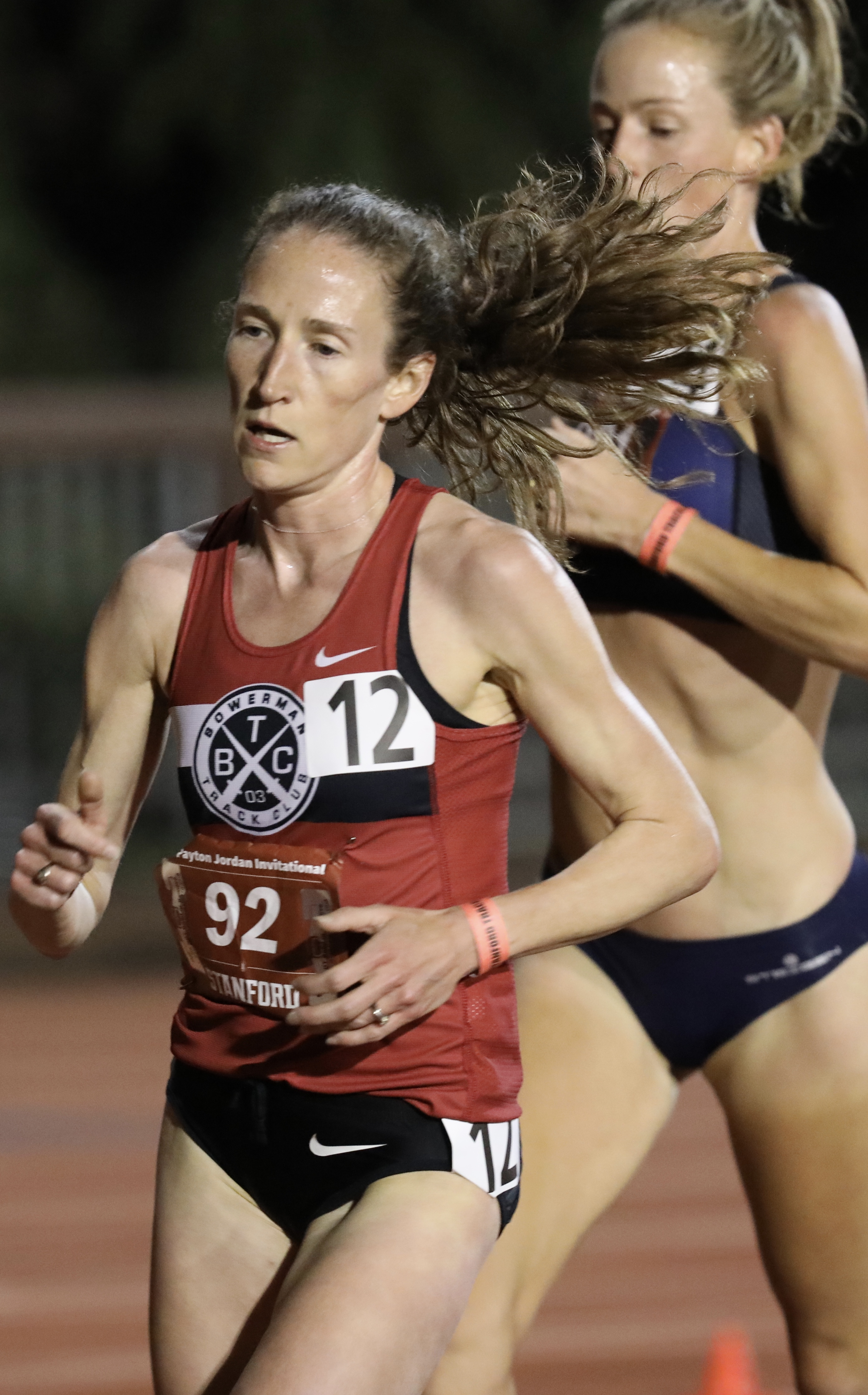

Personal information
- Nationality: American
- Born: May 31, 1983 (age 43)

Sport
- Sport: Athletics
- Event: Marathon

Carrie Dimoff (born May 31, 1983) is an American athlete. She competed in the women's marathon event at the 2019 World Athletics Championships.
