= Athletics at the 2011 Pan American Games – Women's marathon =

Women's marathon at the 2011 Pan American Games
- Venue: Pan American Marathon circuit
- Dates: October 23
- Competitors: 20 from 14 nations

Medalists
Gold medal	Adriana Aparecida da Silva	Brazil
Silver medal	Madaí Pérez	Mexico
Bronze medal	Gladys Tejeda	Peru

The women's marathon competition of the athletics events at the 2011 Pan American Games took place on the 23 of October at the Pan American Marathon circuit. The defending Pan American Games champion is Mariela González of Cuba.

== Records ==
World record	Paula Radcliffe (GBR)	2:15:25	London, Great Britain	April 13, 2003
Pan American Games record	Erika Olivera (CHI)	2:37:41	Winnipeg, Canada	July 25, 1999

== Qualification standards ==
This event did not require any qualification standard be met.

== Schedule ==
Date	Time	Round
October 23, 2011	16:00	Final

== Abbreviations ==
- All times shown are in hours:minutes:seconds

DNF	Did not finish
GR	Pan American Games Record
WR	World Record
DQ	Disqualified
NR	National record
PB	Personal best
SB	Season best

== Results ==
20 athletes from 14 countries competed.

=== Final ===
Rank	Athlete	Time	Notes
1st place, gold medalist(s)	Adriana Aparecida da Silva (BRA)	2:36:37	GR
2nd place, silver medalist(s)	Madaí Pérez (MEX)	2:38:03	
3rd place, bronze medalist(s)	Gladys Tejeda (PER)	2:42:09	
4	Dailín Belmonte (CUB)	2:43:39	
5	Erika Olivera (CHI)	2:44:06	
6	Paula Apolonio (MEX)	2:45:03	
7	Natalia Romero (CHI)	2:47:35	
8	Rosa Chacha (ECU)	2:48:40	
9	Jacquelyn Herron (USA)	2:51:29	
10	Yolimar Pineda (VEN)	2:51:58	
11	Yailen Garcia (CUB)	2:57:37	
12	Gabriela Traña Trigueros (CRC)	3:04:29	
13	Jemena Misayauri (PER)	3:06:40	
14	Maria Diaz (PUR)	3:15:17	
15	Dina Cruz (GUA)	3:22:15	
–	Yolanda Fernández (COL)		DNF
–	Michele Chagas (BOL)		DNF
–	Brett Ely (USA)		DNF
–	Vianka Pereira (BOL)		DNF
–	Raquel Maraviglia (ARG)		DNF
