= Augustus Maiyo =

American long-distance runner

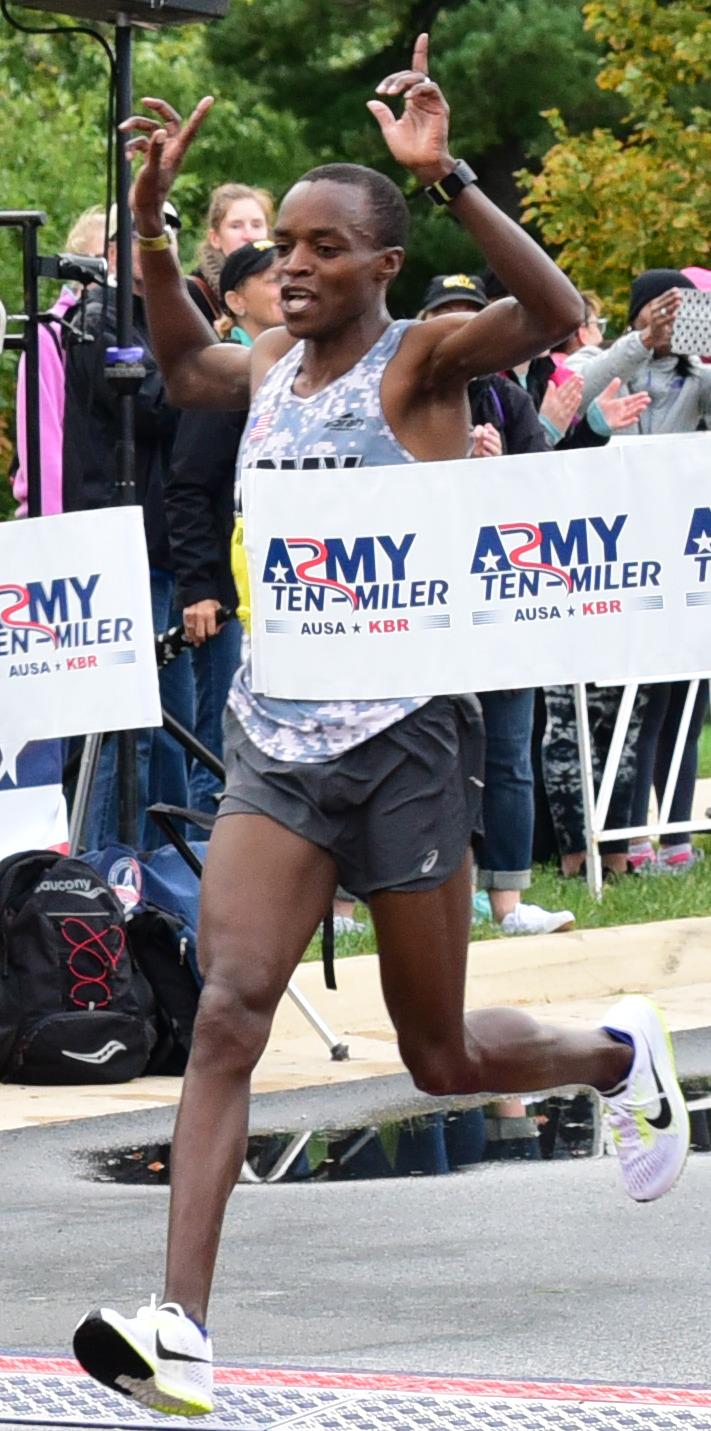
- Maiyo winning the Army Ten-Miler in 2016

Personal information
- Born: May 10, 1983 (age 43)

Sport
- Sport: Athletics
- Event(s): Steeplechase, half marathon, marathon
- Club: U.S. Army

Achievements and titles
- Personal best(s): 3000 mS – 8:29.29 (2012); HM – 1:02:33 (2012); Mar – 2:12:25 (2019)

Augustus Maiyo (born May 10, 1983) is a Kenyan-born American long distance runner. An alumnus of the University of Alabama, he is also in the United States Army and competes in marathons as a member of the U.S. Army World Class Athlete Program.

Maiyo won the 2012 Marine Corps Marathon. At the 2012 IAAF World Half Marathon Championships Maiyo finished 15th.
