= Justyn Knight =

Canadian runner (born 1996)

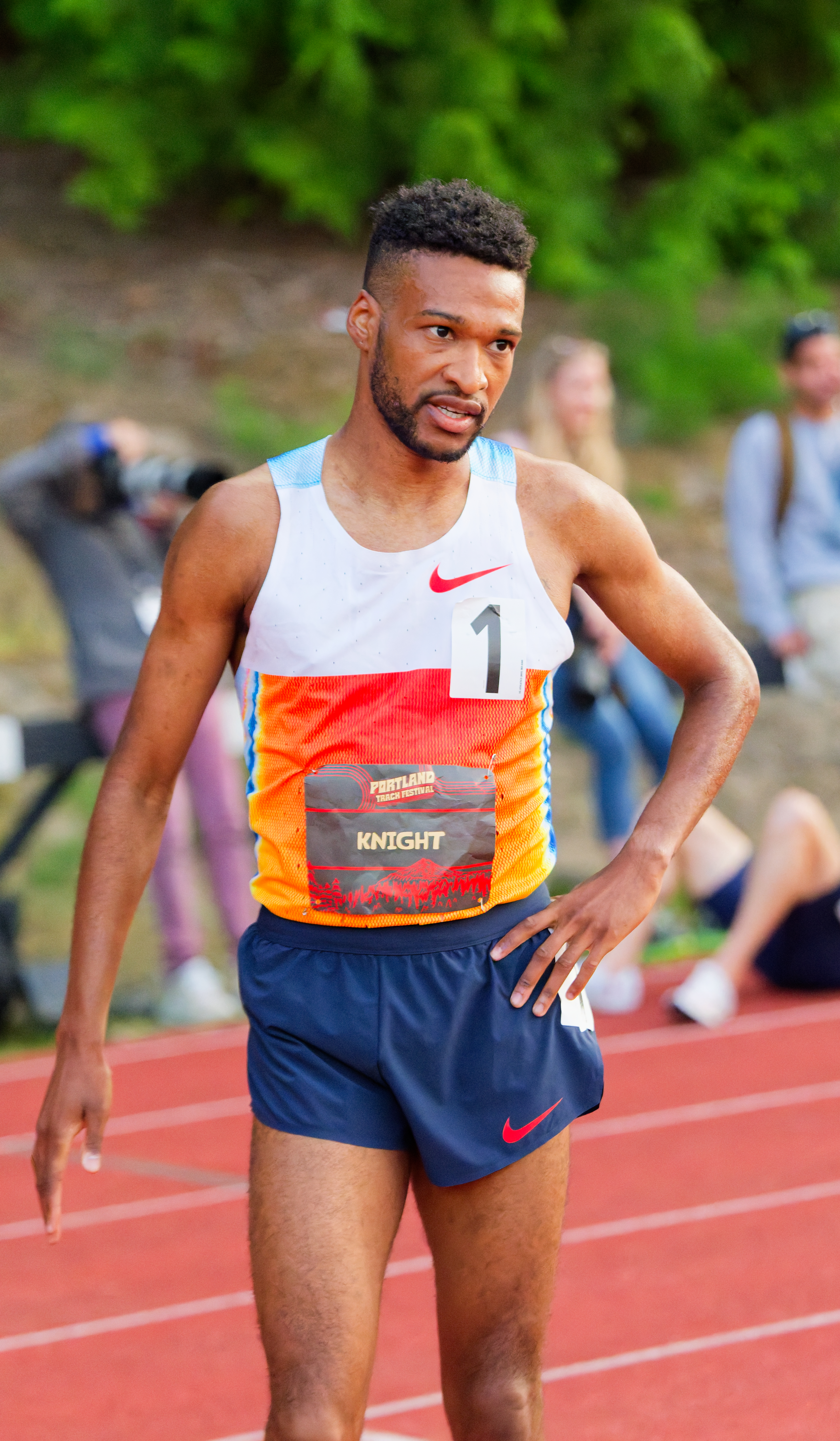
- Knight in 2025

Personal information
- Born: 19 July 1996 (age 30) Toronto, Ontario, Canada
- Height: 179 cm (5 ft 10 in)
- Weight: 60 kg (132 lb)

Sport
- Sport: Track, long-distance running
- University team: Syracuse
- Turned pro: 2018
- Coached by: Jerry Schumacher

Achievements and titles
- Personal bests: Outdoor; 1500 m: 3:33.41 (Walnut 2021); Mile: 3:59.08 (Cork City 2019); 2-mile: 8:19.75 (Palo Alto 2019); 3000 m: 7:41.10 (Budapest 2025); 5000 m: 12:51.93 (Florence 2021); 10,000 m 29:46.41 (Tallahassee 2016); Indoor; 1500 m: 3:36.13 (Boston 2020); Mile: 3:55.82 (Boston 2018); 2-mile: 8:13.92 (Staten Island 2021)
Medal record
Athletics
Representing Canada
North American, Central American and Caribbean Championships
Bronze medal – third place	2018 Toronto	5000 m
Pan Am U20 Cross Country
Gold medal – first place	2015 Barranquilla	Individual
NACAC U20 Cross Country
Silver medal – second place	2014 Tobago	Team
- Updated on 19 August 2021

Justyn Knight (born 19 July 1996) is a Canadian long-distance track runner. A successful collegiate runner during his time at Syracuse University, he was the school's most-decorated distance runner in cross country and track. On the professional scene, he has represented his country at the World and Olympic level, with his highest finish to date being seventh at the 2020 Summer Olympics in Tokyo.

== Running career ==
=== Youth ===
Knight was born and raised in Toronto, Ontario to parents of Afro-Caribbean descent. His mother, Jennifer Knight, was born and raised in Jamaica and moved to Canada at the age of 13. His father, Anthony Knight, born in Canada to parents from Barbados, was a basketball coach. He also has an older brother, Jaryd Knight, who plays volleyball.

Knight took up distance running when he was a high school student in Toronto, starting in Grade 10. He attended St. Michael's College School. Knight won the 2013 Ontario provincial senior cross country title at OFSAA cross country.

=== Collegiate ===
Knight was recruited by Syracuse in 2014. Knight placed 143rd overall at the 2014 NCAA DI Cross Country Championships, which he would later describe as motivation for improvement, stating "I remember races I've lost in great detail. I try to understand why I lost and how I can do better."

Knight placed fourth overall at the 2015 NCAA DI Cross Country Championships. At the 2015 NCAA DI Outdoor Track & Field Championships, Knight placed sixth in the 5000 meters, earning his first All-American honours in track and field in his NCAA collegiate career.

At the 2016 NCAA DI Indoor Track & Field Championships, Knight finished in third place in the 3000 meters final round. He was the runner-up at the 2016 NCAA Division I Cross Country Championships behind Patrick Tiernan and earned All-America status in Cross Country.

On October 27, 2017, Knight won the individual ACC championship, and Syracuse won the ACC team title for the fifth straight year.

Knight headed into his final NCAA outdoor campaign representing Syracuse with three NCAA titles, two individual, from the cross country and indoor track season, and one team from leading the Orange to the 2015 NCAA Cross Country Championship. At the 2018 NCAA Division I Indoor Track and Field Championships, Knight finished in second place in the 3000 meters final round and won the 5000 meters final to earn his first NCAA Division I track title.

=== Professional ===
Knight had made his World Championship debut at the 2017 World Championships in Athletics in London while still a student at Syracuse. He made the event final and placed ninth overall in the 5000 m. He had said he was "happy but not satisfied" with this finish, and in the future would need to expect more from himself.

Upon graduation to the professional ranks, Knight signed a sponsorship deal with Reebok's Boston Track Club. He won a bronze medal in the 5000 m at 2018 NACAC Championships, but by 2019 was struggling with the transition to the professional scene, as it required him to spend more time away from friends and family. This led to a decline in his physical fitness, and upon arriving to compete at the 2019 New Balance Indoor Grand Prix in Boston, he was twenty pounds over his typical race weight. His time in the men's mile was 4:03.34, his worst-ever result at that distance in a competitive race, which he deemed "a huge turning point" as he resolved never to have such a poor result again. He retained his competition bib with notes on his time and placement as motivation.

Knight considered himself to still be out of top shape when he arrived at the 2019 World Athletics Championships in Doha later that year and finished tenth in the 5000 m.

Having missed the Olympic standard for the 2016 Summer Olympics by 1.36 seconds in 2016, Knight entered 2020 focused on securing a place at the 2020 Summer Olympics in Tokyo. He won the gold medal at the Millrose Games in February in the 3000 m distance. The onset of the COVID-19 pandemic resulted in the Games being delayed by a full year, and made training for elite athletics more challenging, as he had to work without teammates from March to October 2020 and could not see his family.

In 2021, Knight returned to competition at the 2021 Diamond League's Golden Gala in Florence, Italy. He finished with a time of 12:51.93, shaving almost twenty seconds off his prior best and running below thirteen minutes in the 5000 m distance for the first time. This was the second-fastest time ever recorded for a North American, behind only compatriot Mohammed Ahmed. Knight was named to the Canadian Olympic team and finished seventh in the 5000 m event. His time of 13:04.38 was an improvement of more than 22 seconds on his prior World Championships appearance. Ahmed won the silver medal on the same day.

Knight withdrew from the 2022 Canadian track and field championships, citing the need to manage an Achilles tendon injury in advance of the 2022 World Athletics Championships.

In August 2023 Knight joined Nike's Bowerman Track Club.

== Achievements ==
=== NCAA results ===
Representing Syracuse Orange
University year	ACC Cross Country	NCAA Cross Country	ACC Indoor	NCAA Indoor	ACC Outdoor	NCAA Outdoor
Senior (2017–18)	8000: 23:13.0 1st	10,000: 29:00.2 1st	3000: 8:02.57 1st 5000: 13:50.79 1st	3000: 8:05.76 2nd 5000: 14:14.47 1st	5000: 13:58.69 1st 1500: 3:49.34 3rd	5000: 13:55.03 2nd
Junior (2016–17)	8000: 22:50.7 1st	10,000: 29:27.3 2nd	3000: 8:05.05 1st 5000: 13:50.27 1st	3000: 7:56.21 2nd	5000: 13:52.38 1st	5000: 14:36.23 3rd
Sophomore (2015–16)	8000: 23:24.3 2nd	10,000: 29:46.1 4th	3000: 8:02.68 1st 5000: 14:01.70 1st DMR: 9:36.74 2nd	3000: 8:01.85 3rd	10,000: 29:46.41 3rd	5000: 13:40.40 10th
Freshman (2014–15)	8000: 23:30.7 8th	10,000: 31:53.4 143rd			1500: 3:47.85 1st	5000: 13:50.96 6th

=== International results ===
Year	Competition	Venue	Position	Event	Notes
Representing Canada
2014	NACAC Junior Cross Country Championships	Mount Irvine, Tobago	5th	6000 m	18:42.64
2014	World Junior Championships	Eugene, Oregon	8th	5000 m	14:08.93
2015	Pan Am Junior Championships	Barranquilla, Colombia	1st	7000 m	19:04
2015	World Cross Country Championships	Guiyang, China	25th	8000 m	25:22
2017	World Championships	London, United Kingdom	9th	5000 m	13:39.15
2018	NACAC Championships	Toronto, Canada	3rd	5000 m	14:01.77
2019	World Championships	Doha, Qatar	10th	5000 m	13:26.63
2020	Millrose Games	New York City, United States	1st	3000 m	7:46.36
2021	Olympic Games	Tokyo, Japan	7th	5000 m	13:04.38
2026	Commonwealth Games	Glasgow, United Kingdom	14th	5000 m	13:36.04
