= Daniel Ferreira do Nascimento =

Brazilian long distance runner (born 1998)

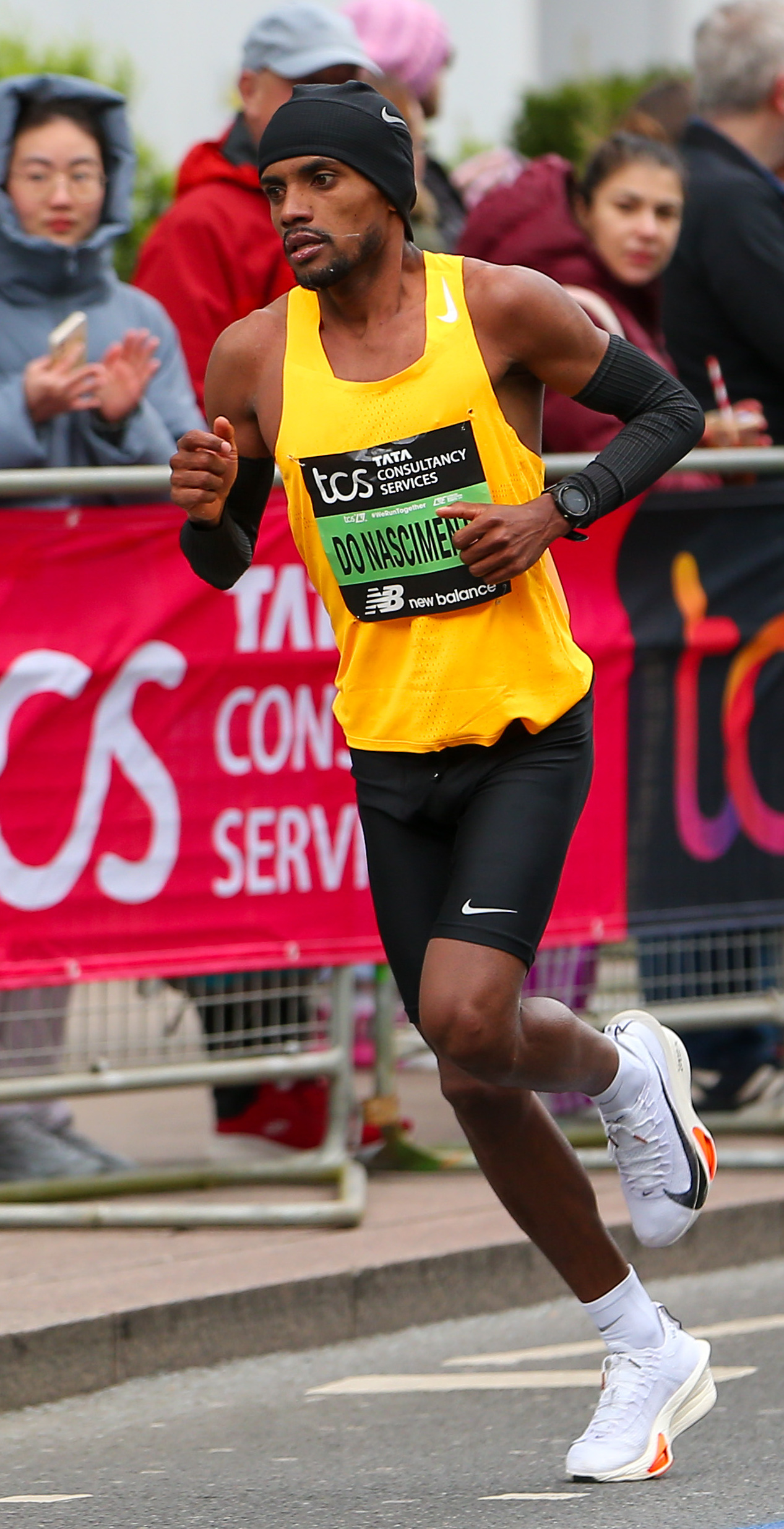
- Nascimento in 2024

Personal information
- Full name: Daniel Ferreira do Nascimento
- Nickname: "Danielzinho"
- Born: 28 July 1998 (age 27) Paraguaçu Paulista, Brazil

Sport
- Sport: Athletics
- Events: 10000 metres; Half marathon; Marathon

Daniel Ferreira do Nascimento (born 28 July 1998) is a Brazilian long distance runner, record holder in the Americas in the race. He is serving a five-year ban from July 2024 following the use of prohibited substances.

== Career ==
In 2020 he took part in the World Athletics Half Marathon Championships, in Gdynia where he ran a personal best of 1:04:27 in the half marathon.

In December 2020, he won the 10,000m and finished 3rd place in 5000m at the Brazilian Championship at the COTP stadium in São Paulo.

He was selected to represent Brazil at the delayed 2020 Tokyo Olympic Games in the marathon after achieving the qualifying standard in his first marathon, winning "The Bicentennial of Peru" competition, in Lima, on May 23, with a time of 2:09:04. On May 29, less than a week after securing Olympic qualification, Danielzinho, as he is known, won the 10,000m at the South American Championship in Guayaquil, Ecuador.

In April 2022, he broke the marathon Area Record for the Americas at the Seoul Marathon, finishing third in 2:04:51. It's the best mark in history made by a marathon runner born outside Africa.

At the 2022 World Athletics Championships, he finished 8th in the Men's marathon, less than 1 minute from the medalists, having stayed in the main peloton until km 33. He led the 2022 New York Marathon before collapsing and requiring medical attention around mile 21 (km 32).

On April 23, 2023, he finished fourth in the Hamburg Marathon with a time of 2:07:06 (being the best non-African in the competition), meeting the qualifying standard for the 2024 Olympic Games.

== Doping violation ==
On July 4, 2024, Daniel Nascimento tested positive for three banned substances Drostanolone, Methenolone, and Nandrolone. All drugs from the S1 anabolic steroid class, precursors of testosterone. In May 2025, he was officially banned for 5 years from 15 July 2024 for Presence/Use of Prohibited Substances with results disqualified from 4 July 2024.

== Personal bests ==
Outdoor

- 1500 metres – 3:46.85 (Campinas 2018)
- 5000 metres – 14:17.07 (São Paulo 2020)
- 10000 metres – 28:40.17 (Rio de Janeiro 2022)
- Half marathon – 1:01:03 (Rio de Janeiro 2022)
- Marathon – 2:04:51 (Seoul 2022)
