= Rachel Hannah =

Canadian athletics competitor

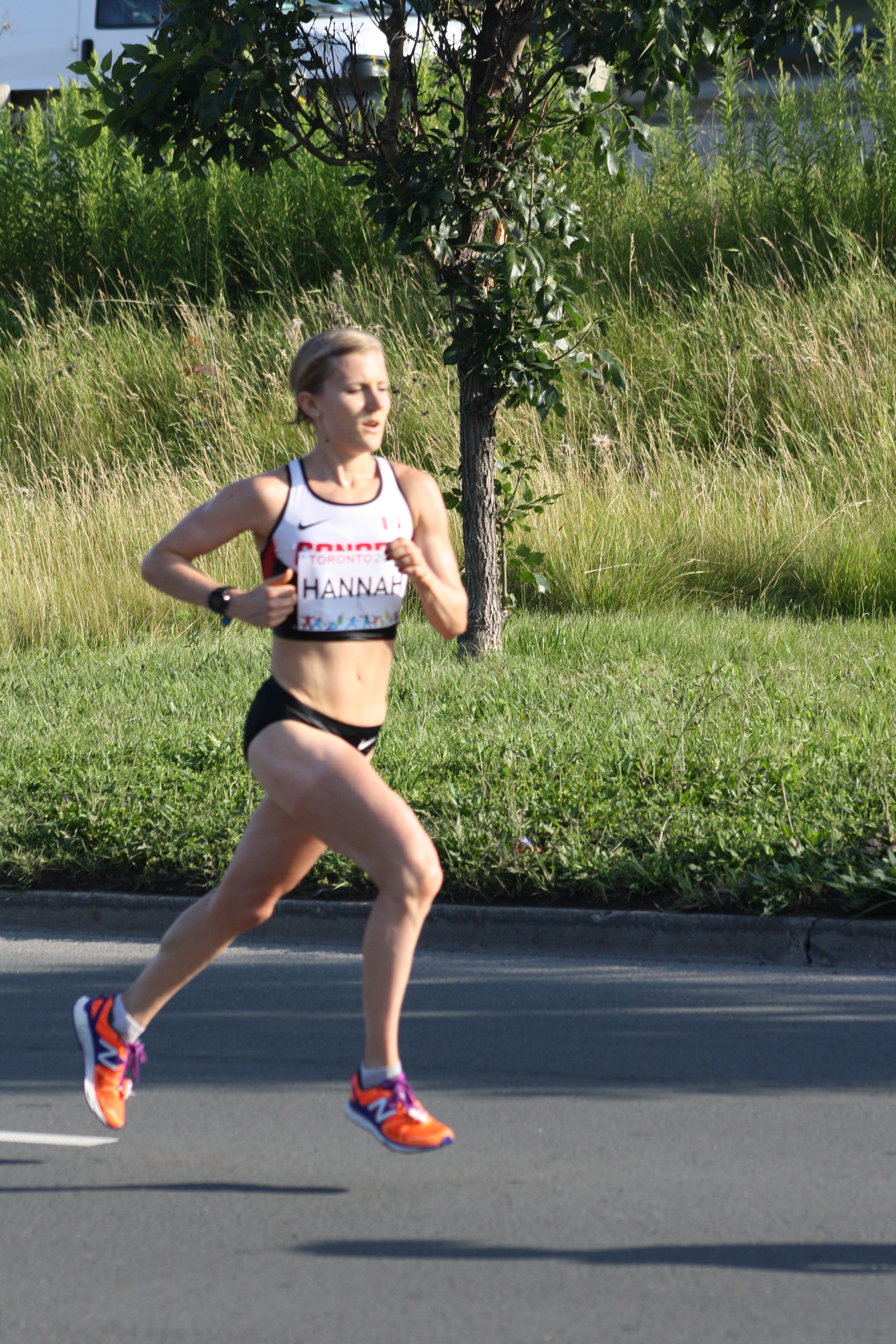

Personal information
- Nationality: Canadian
- Born: 2 October 1986 (age 39) Brampton, Ontario

Sport
- Sport: Marathon/Cross country running
Medal record
Women's athletics
Representing Canada
Pan American Games
Bronze medal – third place	2015 Toronto	Marathon

Rachel Hannah (born 2 October 1986) is a 6x Canadian Champion distance runner. She won the 2025 Canadian Marathon Championships. She competed in the 2013 and 2015 IAAF World Cross Country Championships. She won the Canadian Cross Country Championships in 2014. In 2015, she won a bronze medal in the Pan American Games marathon—her second marathon ever – with a time of 2:41:06. Hannah was born in Brampton, raised in Barrie, and lives in Port Elgin, Ontario. Rachel is also a Registered Dietitian & works as a sports nutrition consultant with Maurten.
