= Gilberto Lopes =

Brazilian long-distance runner

Personal information
- Born: 30 May 1989 (age 36)

Sport
- Country: Brazil
- Sport: Track and field
- Event: Marathon

Gilberto Silvestre Lopes (born 30 May 1989) is a Brazilian long-distance runner who specialises in the marathon. He competed in the marathon event at the 2015 World Championships in Athletics in Beijing, China.

He has a twin brother, Gilmar Silvestre Lopes, who is also an international long-distance runner.
