= Beverly Ramos =

Puerto Rican athlete (born 1987)

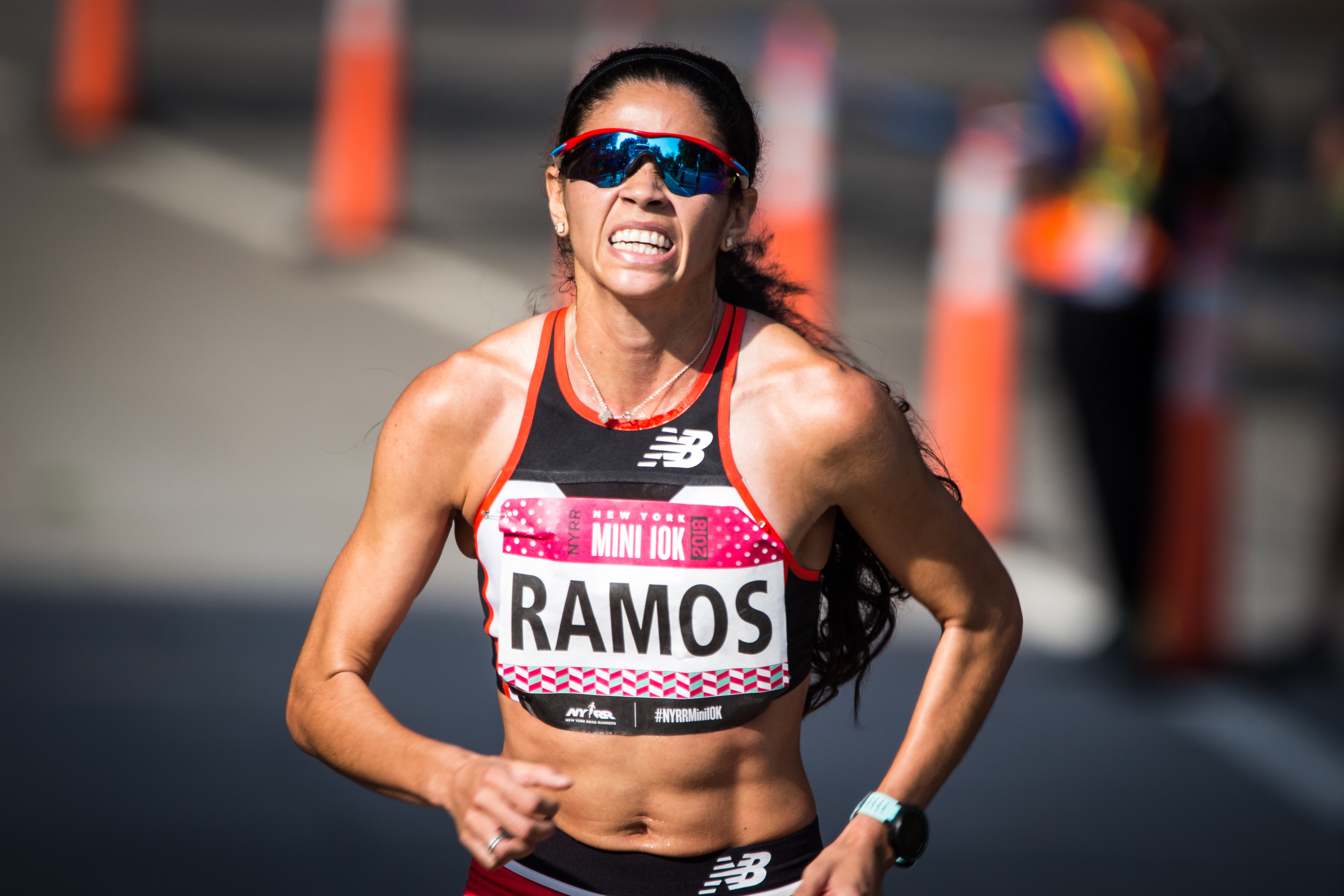
- Ramos in 2018

Personal information
- Full name: Beverly Sue Ramos Morales
- Born: August 24, 1987 (age 39) San Juan, Puerto Rico
- Height: 1.70 m (5 ft 7 in)
- Weight: 52 kg (115 lb)

Sport
- Country: Puerto Rico
- Sport: Athletics
- Events: Middle and Long-distance running
Medal record
Women's athletics
Representing Puerto Rico
NACAC Championships
Bronze medal – third place	2025 Freeport	10,000 m
- Updated on January 1, 2015

Beverly Sue Ramos (born August 24, 1987) is a Puerto Rican runner. She competed in the 3000 metres steeplechase at the 2012 Summer Olympics, placing 35th with a time of 9:55.26. Ramos competed for Colegio Nuestra Senora de Belén. Ramos has trained in Manhattan, Kansas, since 2007 where she was an All-American at Kansas State University. In 2021, she set the all-time record for the Maratón La Guadalupe de Ponce in Ponce, Puerto Rico.

== Personal bests ==
Event	Result	Venue	Date
800 m	2:06.65 min	Mayagüez, Puerto Rico	June 15, 2013
1500 m	4:09.92 min	Burnaby, Canada	July 1, 2011 NR
3000 m	8:57.68 min	Ponce, Puerto Rico	May 17, 2014 NR
5000 m	15:46.65 min	Stanford, United States	April 4, 2014 NR
10,000 m road	33:11 min	Camuy, Puerto Rico	December 4, 2016 NR
Half marathon	1:12:09 hrs	New York City, United States	March 20, 2016 NR
3000 m steeplechase	9:39.33 min	Sotteville-lès-Rouen, France	April 14, 2011 NR
Marathon	2:31:10 hrs	Eugene, United States	July 18, 2022 NR

== Competition record ==
Year	Competition	Venue	Position	Event	Notes
Representing Puerto Rico
2002	CAC Junior Championships (U17)	Bridgetown, Barbados	2nd	1200 m	3:37.38
2002	CAC Junior Championships (U17)	Bridgetown, Barbados	4th	4 × 400 m relay	3:55.48
2003	Central American and Caribbean; Cross Country Championships (U20)	Acapulco, Mexico	6th	6 km	24:25
2003	Central American and Caribbean; Cross Country Championships (U20)	Acapulco, Mexico	2nd	Team (6 km)	18 pts
2003	World Youth Championships	Sherbrooke, Canada	33rd (h)	800 m	2:14.53
2004	World Cross Country Championships (U20)	Brussels, Belgium	106th	6 km	25:02
2004	CAC Junior Championships (U20)	Coatzacoalcos, Mexico	5th	1500 m	4:49.22
2004	CAC Junior Championships (U20)	Coatzacoalcos, Mexico	5th	3000 m	10:32.35
2005	NACAC Cross Country Championships (U20)	Clermont, United States	9th	4 km	16:02
2005	NACAC Cross Country Championships (U20)	Clermont, United States	2nd	Team (4 km)	31 pts
2006	NACAC Cross Country Championships (U20)	Clermont, United States	13th	4 km	15:40
2006	NACAC Cross Country Championships (U20)	Clermont, United States	4th	Team (4 km)	67 pts
2006	Ibero-American Championships	Ponce, Puerto Rico	8th	1500 m	4:32.82
2006	Ibero-American Championships	Ponce, Puerto Rico	7th	3000 m	10:16.46
2006	CAC Junior Championships (U20)	Port of Spain, Trinidad and Tobago	3rd	1500 m	4:34.46
2006	CAC Junior Championships (U20)	Port of Spain, Trinidad and Tobago	1st	5000 m	17:50.96
2009	Central American and Caribbean Championships	Havana, Cuba	4th	5000 m	16:28.29
2010	Central American and Caribbean Games	Mayagüez, Puerto Rico	3rd	1500 m	4:22.02
2010	Central American and Caribbean Games	Mayagüez, Puerto Rico	1st	5000 m	16:09.82
2010	Central American and Caribbean Games	Mayagüez, Puerto Rico	1st	3000 m s'chase	9:59.03
2011	Central American and Caribbean Championships	Mayagüez, Puerto Rico	2nd	3000 m s'chase	9:58:11
2011	World Championships	Daegu, South Korea	16th (h)	3000 m s'chase	9:45.50
2011	Pan American Games	Guadalajara, Mexico	12th	1500 m	4:34.90
2011	Pan American Games	Guadalajara, Mexico	–	3000 m s'chase	DNF
2012	Olympic Games	London, United Kingdom	35th (h)	3000 m s'chase	9:55.26
2013	NACAC Cross Country Championships	Mandeville, Jamaica	3rd	6.075 km	21:48
2013	NACAC Cross Country Championships	Mandeville, Jamaica	3rd	Team (6.075 km)	49 pts
2013	World Cross Country Championships	Bydgoszcz, Poland	55th	8 km	26:25
2013	World Championships	Moscow, Russia	21st (h)	3000 m s'chase	9:49.60
2014	Ibero-American Championships	São Paulo, Brazil	13th	1500 m	4:59.04
2014	Ibero-American Championships	São Paulo, Brazil	3rd	3000 m s'chase	10:03.12
2014	Central American and Caribbean Games	Xalapa, Mexico	4th	5000m	16:24.42 A
2014	Central American and Caribbean Games	Xalapa, Mexico	3rd	3000 m s'chase	10:08.39 A
2015	Pan American Cross Country Cup	Barranquilla, Colombia	4th	7 km	21:35
2015	Pan American Cross Country Cup	Barranquilla, Colombia	5th	Team – 7 km	81 pts
2016	Olympic Games	Rio de Janeiro, Brazil	71st	Marathon	2:43:52
2017	New York City Marathon	New York City, United States	24th	Marathon	2:46:45
2018	Central American and Caribbean Games	Barranquilla, Colombia	2nd	5000 m	16:14.04
2018	Central American and Caribbean Games	Barranquilla, Colombia	2nd	10,000 m	33:46.99
2018	Central American and Caribbean Games	Barranquilla, Colombia	2nd	3000 m s'chase	10:07.71
2022	Ibero-American Championships	Torrevella, Spain	4th	Half marathon	1:14:18
2022	World Championships	Eugene, United States	20th	Marathon	2:31:10
2022	NACAC Championships	Freeport, Bahamas	3rd	10,000 m	35:01.33
2023	Central American and Caribbean Games	San Salvador, El Salvador	5th	Half marathon	1:19:17
2023	World Championships	Budapest, Hungary	–	Marathon	DNF
2023	Pan American Games	Santiago, Chile	11th	Marathon	2:46:22
2025	NACAC Championships	Freeport, Bahamas	3rd	10,000 m	36:08.11
2026	Central American and Caribbean Games	Santo Domingo, Dominican Republic	–	Half marathon	DNF

== Marathons ==
- 2015 New York City Marathon: 15th (2:41:56) 2016 Rio standard
