= Lindsay Flanagan =

American long-distance runner

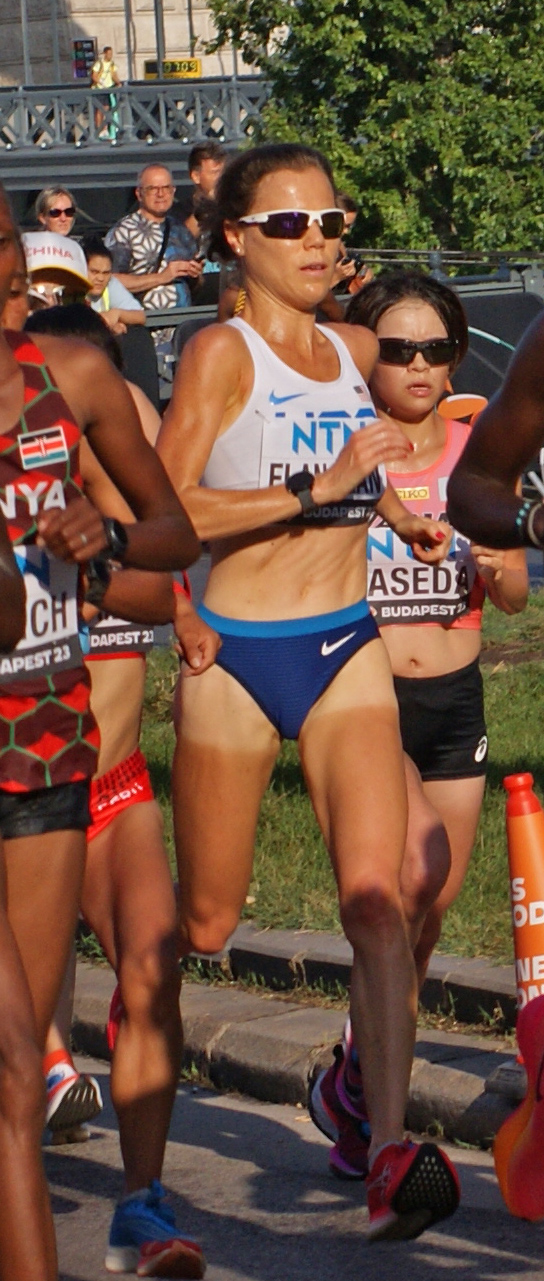
- Flanagan at the 2023 World Athletics Championships

Personal information
- Born: January 24, 1991 (age 35) Roselle, Illinois, U.S.
- Home town: Boulder, Colorado, U.S.
- Height: 5 ft 4 in (1.63 m)
- Weight: 107 lb (49 kg)

Sport
- Event(s): Marathon, 10,000 meters
- College team: Washington
- Turned pro: 2014

Achievements and titles
- Personal bests: 10000 m: 32:04.39 (2021); Marathon: 2:23:31 (2024)
Medal record
Women's athletics
Representing the United States
World Championships
	2017 London	Marathon
Pan American Games
Silver medal – second place	2015 Toronto	Marathon
NACAC Cross Country Team U20
Silver medal – second place	2010 Tobago	Cross Country

Lindsay Flanagan (born January 24, 1991) is an American long-distance runner.

== Prep ==
At 2008 Nike Outdoor Nationals as a junior at Lake Park High School, placed 10th in 2 miles in 10:36.73.

As a senior at Lake Park High School, Lindsay Flanagan was 2008 Illinois High School Association 3A cross country state champion.

Lindsay Flanagan was honored as 2008 Gatorade Cross Country Athlete of the Year for Illinois after placing 9th at 2008 Foot Locker Cross Country Championships in San Diego, California and 5th at 2008 Nike Team Nationals cross country in Portland, Oregon.

Flanagan placed 4th in 2 mile at 2009 Nike Indoor Nationals in Reggie Lewis Track and Athletic Center in 10:27.79.

== NCAA ==
In college, she ran for the Washington Huskies where she was 9th at 2010 USA Junior Cross Country Championships and 2009 NCAA third place cross country team. She represented USA at 2010 NACAC Junior XC Championships in Tobago where she placed sixth overall and third among Americans as Team USA placed second. Flanagan earned Division I All-American honors at 2014 NCAA Division I Outdoor Track and Field Championships in 10,000 meters (14th in 33:32.33).

== Professional ==
Flanagan won 2013 Chicago Half Marathon in 1:16:36 and placed 4th at the 2013 Big Sur Half Marathon in 1:13:56.

Flanagan placed 5th at 2014 Pittsburgh 10 Miler in 55:00 and placed 15th at 2014 Philadelphia Rock 'n' Roll Half Marathon in 1:15:22.

Flanagan placed 9th at 2015 Houston Marathon in 2:33:12, 12th in 53:02 at 2015 Gate River Run and Flanagan won the silver medal in the marathon at the 2015 Pan American Games.

Flanagan placed 4th in 1:12:16 at 2016 USA Half Marathon Championships. Lindsay finished 14th in marathon at US Olympic Marathon Trials in Los Angeles heat approaching 85 degrees in 2:39:42. She finished 18th in 10,000 meters at 2016 United States Olympic Trials (track and field) in 34:17.25. Flanagan finished 4th behind Mamitu Daska Molisa of Ethiopia, Fate Tola of Germany, and Sarah Jebet of Kenya at 2016 Frankfurt Marathon in a new personal best time 2:29:28.

Flanagan won the 2017 Hyannis Half Marathon in Hyannis, Massachusetts running 1:14:38. Flanagan placed 11th at the 2017 Boston Marathon in 2:34:44 and 37th at 2017 World Championships in Athletics – Women's marathon in 2:39:47. In Fall 2017, Flanagan left Washington, D.C., Mizuno and Riadha Elite Development Program to join Boulder Track Club and Nike.

Flanagan placed 13th in 56:30 in 2018 Cherry blossom 10 mile, 2nd at 2018 Bay to Breakers 12 km in 40:44, and 9th at 2018 USA Half Marathon Championships in 1:14:15. Flanagan placed 7th at 2018 Freihofer's Run for Women in 16:28. Flanagan placed 13th in 2:29:25 at 2018 Frankfurt Marathon and earned the 2019 World Championships marathon standard.

Flanagan placed 9th overall (3rd American woman) at the 2019 Boston Marathon in 2:30:07 and earned the 2020 Summer Olympics Qualification standard by finishing top 10 in a World Marathon Majors.

Flanagan placed 11th overall (1st American woman) at the 2022 Paris Marathon in 2:26:54.

Flanagan won the 2022 Gold Coast Marathon, setting a course record in 2:24:43.

Flanagan placed 8th at the 2023 Tokyo Marathon in 2:26:08 and 9th in the 2024 2024 Chicago Marathon in 2:23:31, a new PR.

== Personal bests ==
- 10,000 metres – 32:22.15 (Palo Alto 2015)
- Half marathon – 1:09:17 (Houston 2025)
- Marathon – 2:23:31 (Chicago 2024)
