= Alfredo Arévalo =

Guatemalan marathon runner

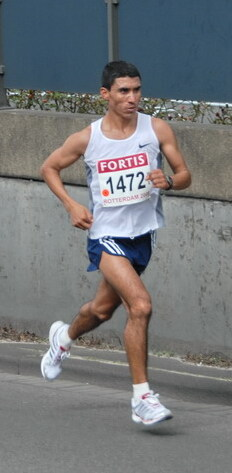
- Arévalo in the 2008 Rotterdam Marathon

Personal information
- Full name: Alfredo Arévalo Reyes
- Nationality: Guatemala
- Born: 20 February 1976 (age 50) Uspantán, El Quiché, Guatemala
- Height: 1.62 m (5 ft 4 in)
- Weight: 52 kg (115 lb)

Sport
- Sport: Athletics
- Event: Marathon

Achievements and titles
- Personal best: Marathon: 2:12:53 (2004)
Medal record
Men's athletics
Representing Guatemala
CAC Championships
Bronze medal – third place	2013 Morelia	5000 m
Bronze medal – third place	2013 Morelia	10,000 m
Central American Games
Bronze medal – third place	2013 San José	5000 m
- Updated on 17 December 2014

Alfredo Arévalo Reyes (born 20 February 1976) is a Guatemalan marathon runner. In 2004, he achieved both his personal best and a national record-breaking time of 2:12:53 at the National Capital Marathon in Ottawa, Canada.

Arevalo made his official debut for the 2004 Summer Olympics in Athens, where he finished seventy-seventh in the men's marathon, outside his personal best of 2:34:02.

At the 2008 Summer Olympics in Beijing, Arevalo competed again for the second time in men's marathon, along with his compatriot José Amado García. He finished the race in sixty-third place by twelve seconds behind Montenegro's Goran Stojiljković, with a time of 2:28:26.

== Personal bests ==
- 5000 m: 14:30.07 min – Guatemala City, Guatemala, 18 February 2006
- 10,000 m: 29:21.43 min – Stanford, United States, 1 May 2010
- Half marathon: 1:06:42 hrs – San Pedro Sula, Honduras, 19 June 2004
- Marathon: 2:12:53 hrs – Ottawa, Canada, 30 May 2004

== Achievements ==
Year	Competition	Venue	Position	Event	Notes
Representing Guatemala
2001	Central American and Caribbean Championships	Guatemala City, Guatemala	4th	Half marathon	1:06:50
2001	World Championships in Athletics	Edmonton, Canada	56th	Marathon	2:34:16
2002	Central American and Caribbean Games	San Salvador, El Salvador	4th	Marathon	2:21:53
2003	Pan American Games	Santo Domingo, Dominican Republic	—	Marathon	DNF
2003	Central American and Caribbean Championships	St. George's, Grenada	2nd	10,000 m	29:39.48
2004	Olympic Games	Athens, Greece	76th	Marathon	2:34:02
2005	NACAC Cross Country Championships	Clermont, United States	2nd	8 km	25:16
2005	World Cross Country Championships	Saint-Galmier, France	123rd	12.02 km	41:29
2005	Central American Championships	San José, Costa Rica	2nd	10,000 m	30:45.72
2005	Central American and Caribbean Championships	Nassau, Bahamas	5th	5000 m	14:42.58
2005	World Championships	Helsinki, Finland	52nd	Marathon	2:25:37
2006	NACAC Cross Country Championships	Clermont, United States	4th	8 km	25:55
2006	NACAC Cross Country Championships	Clermont, United States	3rd	8 km (Team)	48 pts
2006	World Cross Country Championships	Fukuoka, Japan	93rd	12 km	39:10
2006	Central American and Caribbean Games	Cartagena, Colombia	3rd	Marathon	2:28:27
2007	NACAC Cross Country Championships	Clermont, United States	7th	8 km	25:40
2007	NACAC Cross Country Championships	Clermont, United States	2nd	8 km (Team)	58 pts
2007	Central American Championships	San José, Costa Rica	2nd	10,000 m	30:10.98
2007	Pan American Games	Rio de Janeiro, Brazil	9th	Marathon	2:21:48
2008	Olympic Games	Beijing, China	63rd	Marathon	2:28:26
2010	Central American and Caribbean Games	Mayagüez, Puerto Rico	5th	Marathon	2:25:55
2010	Central American Championships	Guatemala City, Guatemala	1st	5000 m	14:49.91
2011	Central American Championships	San José, Costa Rica	1st	10,000 m	31:07.06
2011	Pan American Games	Guadalajara, Mexico	11th	Marathon	2:25:53
2013	Central American Games	San José, Costa Rica	3rd	5000 m	14:56.00
2013	Central American Games	San José, Costa Rica	4th	10,000 m	31:30.28
2013	Central American and Caribbean Championships	Morelia, Mexico	3rd	5000 m	15:22.23
2013	Central American and Caribbean Championships	Morelia, Mexico	3rd	10,000 m	32:23.55
2014	Central American and Caribbean Games	Xalapa, Mexico	6th	Marathon	2:26:34 A
