= Allie Kieffer =

American long-distance runner (born 1987)

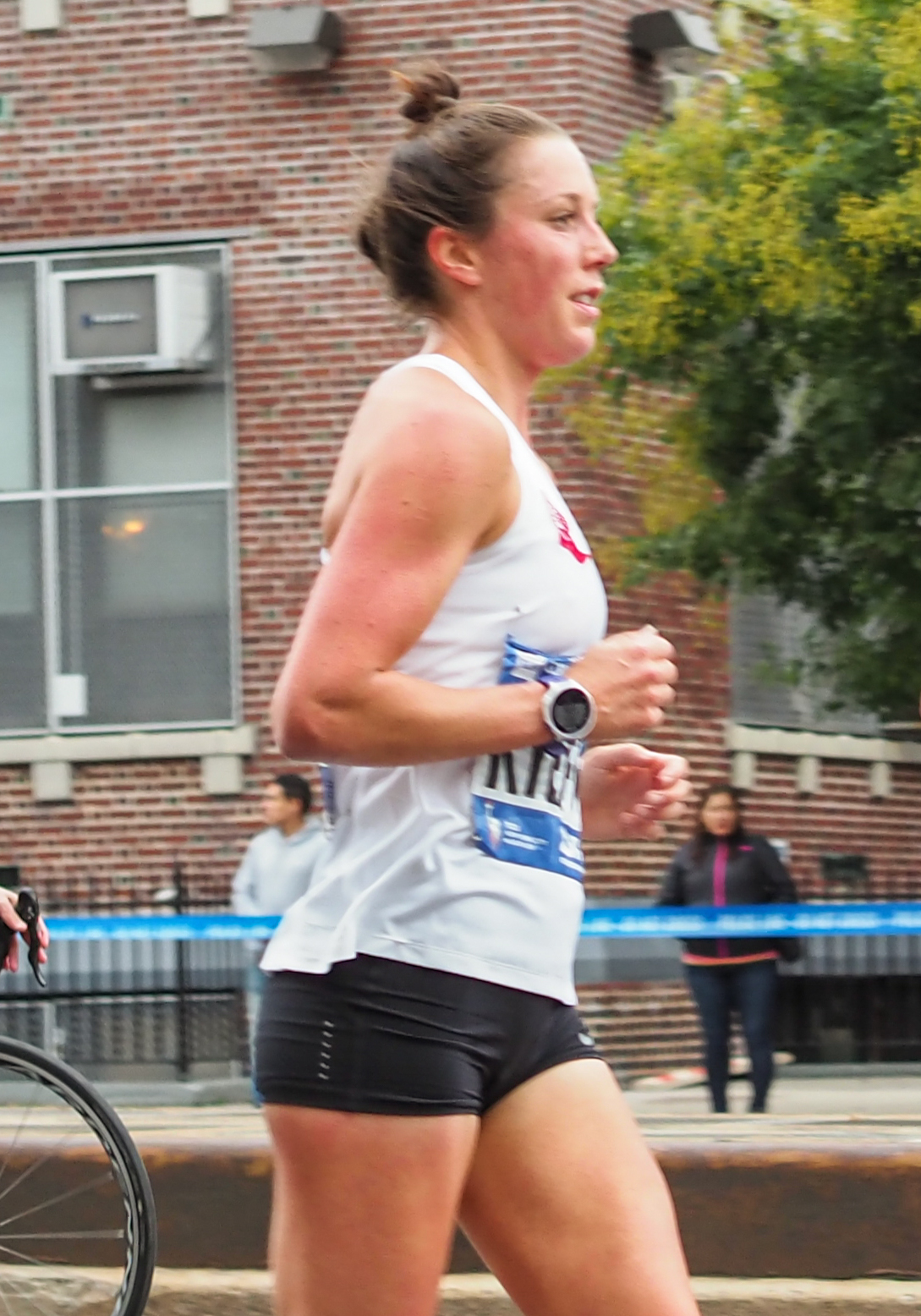
- Kieffer at the 2017 New York City Marathon

Personal information
- Born: Allison Kieffer; September 16, 1987 (age 38) West Islip, New York, U.S.
- Height: 5 ft 4 in (1.63 m)

Sport
- Country: United States
- Sport: Track, long-distance running
- Event: 5000 m Marathon
- College team: Wake Forest Demon Deacons
- Club: New York Athletic Club; Nike Moon Shoot Project
- Turned pro: 2010
- Coached by: Brad Hudson

Achievements and titles
- Personal best(s): 5000 m: 15:57 10,000 m: 32:09.89; Half Marathon:1:10:40 Marathon:2:28:12
Medal record
Women's athletics
Representing the United States
NACAC Cross Country Championships
Gold medal – first place	2011 Port of Spain, Trinidad and Tobago	Women team

Allison Kieffer (born September 16, 1987) is an American athlete who competes in distance running events. Kieffer placed 5th in 2:29:39 at the 2017 New York City Marathon. She placed 7th at the 2018 New York City Marathon with a time of 2:28:12. Kieffer is a coach and nutritionist.

== Professional ==
=== 2010-2015 ===
Kieffer joined the New York Athletic Club and ran with Princeton Tigers All-American Sarah Cummings. She placed sixth with a time of 20:14.2 at the 2010 USATF National Club Cross Country Championships in Charlotte, North Carolina. Kieffer qualified to represent Team USA at the 2011 NACAC Cross Country Championships.

At the 2011 NACAC Cross Country Championships' 6 km race at Port of Spain, Trinidad and Tobago, Keiffer placed fourth with a time of 20:29.6 behind Team USA teammates Kim Conley, and Megan Duwell and champion Kathryn Harrison. The US team took home gold medals.

In 2012 Kieffer was trained in Boulder, Colorado by Coach Brad Hudson and ran a 10 km at Stanford University in a time of 32:25.69 on April 29, 2012, which qualified her for the 10,000 meters at the 2012 United States Olympic Trials (track and field). She did not start due to injury.

Kieffer placed 47th at the 2013 US Cross Country Championships in Saint Louis, Missouri. In 2014 Kieffer won the Japan Day race in the New York Road Runners on May 11. Kieffer placed second at the 2015 10 km Scotland Run in Central Park, New York with a time of 35:28 in April 2015. She placed 20th at USA Road 5 km championships hosted by CVS in Providence, Rhode Island with a time 17:05 on September 20, 2015.

=== 2016 ===
In January, Kieffer placed first winning the 2016 Miami Marathon in 2:55:30. She chose to switch from the half marathon the night before the race after learning the elite field for the half-marathon was full and only one woman in the elite meeting was running the full marathon.

On April 9, 2016, Kieffer placed first winning the 2016 Fort Washington Avenue Armory Indoor Track marathon with a time of 2:44:44 (setting an indoor world record) which was broken the next year. Kieffer placed ninth at the Cherry Blossom 10-Mile Run in a time of 56:40.90.

=== 2017 ===
Kieffer placed fifth in 2:29:39 at the 2017 New York City Marathon. She placed fourth in the 2017 10 mile championship hosted at the Medtronic Twin Cities Marathon in Minneapolis–Saint Paul. Kieffer placed 11th in the 10,000 meters in Sacramento, California at the 2017 USA Outdoor Track and Field Championships in a time of 33:24.78.

=== 2018 ===
Kieffer won Doha Half Marathon in a best time of 70 minutes 40 seconds.
Kieffer placed fourth in 32:52 at the AJC Peachtree Road Race which hosted the USATF 10 km road championships behind winner Stephanie Bruce, Aliphine Tuliamuk, and Sara Hall.
Kieffer placed second at 2018 Faxon Law New Haven Road Race US 20 km road Championships in 85 degree and humid conditions in a time of 1:09:20 behind winner Sara Hall. She placed 7th in the 2018 New York City Marathon with a time of 2:28:12.

== US Championships ==
Year	Competition	Venue	Position	Event	Notes
2018	US 20km road Championships hosted by Faxon Law New Haven Road Race	New Haven, Connecticut	2nd	20,000 m	1:09:20
2018	US 10km road Championships; AJC Peachtree Road Race	Atlanta, Georgia	4th	10,000 m	32:52
2017	USATF 20 km Road Championships hosted by Faxon Law New Haven Road Race	Davenport, Iowa	6th	20 km	1:08:20
2017	USATF 10 mile Road Championships hosted by Medtronic TC 10 Mile	St Paul-Minneapolis, Minnesota	4th	10 mile	54:20
2017	2017 USA Outdoor Track and Field Championships	Sacramento, California	11th	10,000 meters	33:24.78
2015	USATF 5 km Road Championships hosted by CVS Health Downtown 5k	Providence, Rhode Island	20th	5 km	17:05
2013	USA Cross Country Championships	Forest Park (St. Louis, Missouri)	47th	8000 meters	29:53.5
2012	USATF 25 km Road Championships hosted by Fifth Third River Bank Run	Grand Rapids, Michigan	5th	25 km	1:26:29
2011	USATF 1 Mile Road Championships hosted by Medtronic TC 1 Mile	Minneapolis, Minnesota	6th	1 mile	4:40.9
2011	USA Indoor Track and Field Championships	Albuquerque, New Mexico	3rd	3000m	9:35.89
2011	USA Cross Country Championships	Mission Bay Park; San Diego	10th	8000 meters	27:59
2006	USA Junior Cross Country Championships	Van Cortlandt Park; New York City New York	17th	6000 meters	21:40

== NCAA ==
Allie Kieffer graduated from Wake Forest University in 2009. Kieffer earned a scholarship to run collegiately at Wake Forest Demon Deacons in NCAA Division 1 national cross country and track and field. Kieffer went to post grad at Arizona State University in 2009–2010.

Representing Arizona State University
Year	Pac-12 Cross Country	NCAA Cross Country	MPSF indoor	NCAA indoor	Pac-12 Outdoor	NCAA Outdoor
2009-10	15th place 20:28.36	49th place 20:55.8	3000 meters 9th place 9:31.91			
Representing Wake Forest University
Year	ACC Cross Country	NCAA Cross Country	ACC indoor	NCAA indoor	ACC Outdoor	NCAA Outdoor
2008-09	11th place 21:13.2					
2007-08						
2006-07	47th place 23:02.5	196th 22:58.8				
2005-06	48th place 20:59.0					

== Early life and education ==
Kieffer grew up in West Islip, New York and attended West Islip High School. She earned four-time all-state NYSPHSAA selection. Kieffer competed in the 2003 Foot Locker Cross Country Championships. She placed second place in the indoor mile at the 2004 national high school championships to earn All-America honors.
