= 2008 NACAC Cross Country Championships =

- Organisers: NACAC
- Edition: 4th
- Date: March 1
- Host city: Orlando, Florida, United States
- Venue: Disney's Wide World of Sports Complex
- Events: 4
- Distances: 7.91 km – Senior men 6 km – Junior men (U20); 6 km – Senior women 4.09 km – Junior women (U20)
- Participation: 64 athletes from 6 nations

The 2008 NACAC Cross Country Championships took place on March 1, 2008. The races were held at the Disney's Wide World of Sports Complex in Orlando, Florida, United States. Detailed reports of the event were given.

Complete results were published.

== Medallists ==
Event	Gold		Silver		Bronze	
Individual
Senior men (7.91 km)	Thomas Morgan; United States	22:42	Josh Simpson; United States	22:48	Dylan Wykes; Canada	22:57
Junior (U20) men (6 km)	Aleksandr Kuternin; Canada	17:21	Ryan Sheridan; United States	17:23	Gregg Brendan; United States	17:32
Senior women (6 km)	Carmen Douma-Hussar; Canada	19:24	Korene Hinds; Jamaica	19:33	Kathleen Trotter; United States	19:35
Junior (U20) women (4.09 km)	Kendra Schaff; Canada	13:03	Emily Reese; United States	13:15	Sheila Reid; Canada	13:18
Team
Senior men	United States	14 pts	Canada	22 pts		
Junior (U20) men	Canada	10 pts	Puerto Rico	34 pts		
Senior women	Canada	24 pts	United States	25 pts	Puerto Rico	47 pts
Junior (U20) women	Canada	13 pts	United States	29 pts	Puerto Rico	49 pts

== Medal table (unofficial) ==
* Host nation (United States)

Rank	Nation	Gold	Silver	Bronze	Total
1	Canada	6	1	2	9
2	United States*	2	5	2	9
3	Puerto Rico	0	1	2	3
4	Jamaica	0	1	0	1
Totals (4 entries)		8	8	6	22

- Note: Totals include both individual and team medals, with medals in the team competition counting as one medal.

== Participation ==
According to an unofficial count, 64 athletes from 6 countries participated.

- Bahamas (4)
- Canada (24)
- Jamaica (4)
- Puerto Rico (16)
- Saint Lucia (1)
- United States (15)

== See also ==
- 2008 in athletics (track and field)
