= 2010 NACAC Cross Country Championships =

- Organisers: NACAC
- Edition: 6th
- Date: March 6
- Host city: Mount Irvine, Tobago, Trinidad and Tobago
- Venue: Mount Irvine Bay Golf Course
- Events: 4
- Distances: 8 km – Senior men 6 km – Junior men (U20); 6 km – Senior women 4 km – Junior women (U20)
- Participation: 107 athletes from 11 nations

The 2010 NACAC Cross Country Championships took place on March 6, 2010. The races were held at the Mount Irvine Bay Golf Course in Mount Irvine, Tobago, Trinidad and Tobago. The course was described to be generally flat with two inclines, one approximately 100m long, and the other 60m long. A detailed report of the event was given for the IAAF.

Complete results were published.

== Medallists ==
Event	Gold		Silver		Bronze	
Individual
Senior men (8 km)	Max King; United States	23:48.2	Michael Spence; United States	24:06.0	Robert Mack; United States	24:25.1
Junior (U20) men (6 km)	Kemoy Campbell; Jamaica	17:59.9	Mohammed Ahmed; Canada	18:20.3	Erik Olson; United States	18:37.0
Senior women (6 km)	Delilah DiCrescenzo; United States	20:49.5	Emily Harrison; United States	21:01.2	Anayeli Navarro (Mexico) México	21:20.8
Junior (U20) women (4 km)	Geneviève Lalonde; Canada	13:49.4	Madeline Morgan; United States	13:52.8	Caroline Pfister; Canada	13:55.1
Team
Senior men	United States	10	(Mexico) México	34	Guyana	52
Junior (U20) men	Canada	23	United States	28	Jamaica	45
Senior women	United States	12	(Mexico) México	26	Trinidad and Tobago	52
Junior (U20) women	Canada	16	United States	24	Jamaica	56

== Medal table (unofficial) ==
Rank	Nation	Gold	Silver	Bronze	Total
1	United States (USA)	4	5	2	11
2	Canada (CAN)	3	1	1	5
3	Jamaica (JAM)	1	0	2	3
4	Mexico (MEX)	0	2	1	3
5	Guyana (GUY)	0	0	1	1
Totals (5 entries)		8	8	7	23

- Note: Totals include both individual and team medals, with medals in the team competition counting as one medal.

== Participation ==
According to an unofficial count, 107 athletes from 11 countries participated. The announced athletes from the Dominican Republic did not show.

- Aruba (4)
- Bahamas (1)
- Bermuda (7)
- Canada (12)
- Guyana (7)
- Jamaica (12)
- (Mexico) México (16)
- Puerto Rico (12)
- Saint Vincent and the Grenadines (1)
- Trinidad and Tobago (15)
- United States (20)

== See also ==
- 2010 in athletics (track and field)
