= Kate Van Buskirk =

Canadian long-distance runner

Personal information
- Born: June 9, 1987 (age 39) Brampton, Ontario, Canada
Medal record
Women's Athletics
Representing Canada
Gold medal – first place	2006 NACAC	Junior (U20) Cross Country
Bronze medal – third place	2014 Commonwealth Games	1500 metres

Kate Van Buskirk (born June 9, 1987, in Brampton, Ontario) is a Canadian Olympian, cross-country and track runner, with 18 years National Team experience. She won bronze for Canada at the 2014 Commonwealth Games in the 1500 m. She was named as an Athlete Director of Athletics Canada, 2019-2022.

After setting the Canadian record time for the indoor mile, in 2018, she was invited to Team Canada at the 2018 IAAF World Indoor Championships.

She ran in the 5000 metre at the 2020 Summer Olympics, in Tokyo.

Van Buskirk began running marathons in 2024, winning the women's category in her debut.

She has hosted various races on television and the internet, and previously hosted and produced a podcast.

== Career ==
=== Early competition ===
In 2003, as a student at Turner Fenton Secondary School, Van Buskirk set the record for junior girls ROPSSAA (Region of Peel Secondary Schools Athletic Association) 800 m, at 2:17.58. She followed this up in 2004, by setting the record in the senior girls ROPSSAA 800 m category, at 2:11.47, and in the 1500 m category, at 4:38.53. Both records still stand.

Kate won the 2004 Runners' Choice London Distance Festival for the 800 m , and third in the 800 m juniors at the Hamilton Spectator Indoor Games.

Van Buskirk won the title of "Athlete of the Year" from the City of Brampton in 2004. She also won the 2004 Ken Giles Award for Brampton's Amateur Athlete of the Year, from The Brampton Guardian. She also won her high school's female athlete of the year award in the 2004–2005 school year. These awards were not only for her cross country and track running, but also volleyball. Kate attended Duke University in North Carolina, where she sang Alto II for the Duke Chorale and Chamber Choir under the direction of Rodney Wynkoop.

=== Early international competition ===
In March 2005, Van Buskirk went to the IAAF World Cross Country Championships, held in Le Mans, France. She finished in the top half, at 57th place, despite hot and humid conditions. This was the second highest Canadian finish at the event.

Van Buskirk graduated from Turner Fenton Secondary School in June 2005 with honours at the Academic level of study, but returned for a fifth year.

In 2005, Van Buskirk won her category of the McQuaid Invitational, a race for high school athletes, held in Rochester, New York. At the event Van Buskirk set a meet record. Later, Van Buskirk won the Ontario Federation of School Athletic Associations (OFSAA) championship for her category. Next Van Buskirk won the Ontario Track and Field Association (OTFA) junior championship. She placed fifth in the 800 metres at the Pan American Junior Track and Field Championships, held in Windsor, Ontario, in August.

In December 2005, Van Buskirk won the Canadian junior championship, held in Vancouver, British Columbia. She ran the 5000-metre distance in 16:38, three seconds faster than Anita Campbell of Abbotsford, British Columbia, a runner at University of Washington.

In May 2005, Van Buskirk set the current ROPSSAA record for girls open steeplechase, at 5:12.00.

The Canadian junior title qualified her for the NACAC Cross Country Championships (North America, Central America and Caribbean Athletic Association) in Florida, to be held March 2006. Van Buskirk told The Brampton Guardian "I really don't know what to expect (at NACAC) because I've never been there." Because of this win, Athletics Canada chose her for the 2006 World Cross Country Championships in Fukuoka, Japan, to be held in April. Van Buskirk told the Guardian that she'd "like to be top 30 and the top Canadian" at the Worlds. Cramps, late in the race, hampered her result to 45th place.

As of 2006, Van Buskirk trained 12 to 16 km daily, with long runs of 18 km. She trains at the Mississauga Track Club, under her coach/father Jim Van Buskirk, as well as training with the Toronto Olympic Club and coach Eddie Raposo.

Kate won gold medal at 2006 NACAC Cross Country Championships (North America, Central America and the Caribbean).

=== University competition ===
Van Buskirk accepted an athletics scholarship for Duke University, beginning in fall 2006.

She placed third in the 800 at an Atlantic Coast Conference race in April 2007.

She placed second in the mile at the NCAA Indoor Track & Field Championships in 2011.

Kate finished 10th in the final Athletics at the 2011 Summer Universiade – Women's 1500 metres.

=== Career competition ===
Kate place 6th in the 1500 metres semifinal 14th IAAF World Championships in Athletics. Kate's 4:07.36 was a personal best time 2013 World Championships in Athletics – Women's 1500 metres.

Kate earned bronze medal Athletics at the 2014 Commonwealth Games – Women's 1500 metres. She was named Canadian Running Female Runner of the Year that year.

Kate will represent Canada in the 1500 metres at the 15th IAAF World Championship in Athletics

In January 2018, Van Buskirk broke the Canadian record in the indoor mile, with a time of 4:26.92, when at the Dr. Sander Invitational at the Armory in New York City. She beat Rachel Schneider and Karissa Schweizer, both by less than a second. Also that winter, Van Buskirk was signed by Nike. In February, she was announced as part of Canada's team at the 2018 IAAF World Championships.

She placed third in the 5000 metre at the Payton Jordan Invitational, in May, with a time of 15:16.34. Falling during the Prefontaine Classic, she entered the 800 metre at the Speed River Inferno in Guelph. In June, she placed second in a 1500-metre race in London, Ontario, and second at the Canadian 5K Road Championships in Toronto.

Van Buskirk is looking to return to her roots in the 1500 metre for the 2019 season.

Van Buskirk ran under the Olympic entry standard for the 5000 metre, at an Irvine, California track meet in May 2021. "Her time is the fourth fastest among Canadian women all-time," according to Canadian Running magazine.

On July 3, 2021, it was announced that Van Buskirk was selected to represent Canada in the Women's 5000m at the 2020 Olympics in Tokyo, Japan. She finished in her heat at 15:14.96.

=== Marathon competition ===
In 2024, Van Buskirk took up the marathon. Nashville Track Club founder Dave Milner is her training partner and coach. Van Buskirk ran her first half-marathon in early March, while also serving as co-race director.

Her debut full marathon was the St. Jude Rock ‘n’ Roll Running Series Nashville Marathon in Nashville, Tennessee; she was the female winner.

== Broadcaster ==
Van Buskirk previously hosted, edited, and produced Canadian Running Magazine podcast The Shakeout, beginning in 2018.

Van Buskirk's sixth year broadcasting from the Scotiabank Toronto Waterfront Marathon was 2023; certain years have been carried on CBC Sports' live stream. In 2022, Van Buskirk joined Diamond League World Athletics coverage on CBC, with Andi Petrillo and Scott Russell. Other broadcasts include the Athletics Ontario Ontario U20, Open, and Para Championships.

== Personal life ==
Van Buskirk was reported to be a member of the Toronto Children's Chorus for 11 years. As of 2006, she was reported to sing hard rock songs before races.

She was a four-time honours student in high school.

Van Buskirk has had an interest in track since at least the 1996 Summer Olympics, where Donovan Bailey set the 100m track record.
