= List of botanic gardens in Trinidad and Tobago =

Botanic gardens in Trinidad and Tobago have collections consisting entirely of Trinidad and Tobago native and endemic species; most have a collection that include plants from around the world. There are botanical gardens and arboreta in all states and territories of Trinidad and Tobago, most are administered by local governments, some are privately owned.

- Scarborough Botanic Gardens – Tobago
- Royal Botanic Gardens, Trinidad – Port of Spain, Trinidad
