= Everlyne Lagat =

American long-distance runner

Sport
- Country: Kenya
- Sport: Athletics
- Event: Long-distance running
- University team: Washington State Cougars

Everlyne Lagat (also known as Evelyn Lagat; born December 2, 1980) is a retired long-distance runner with multiple marathon wins. Lagat has nine siblings, all of whom ran competitively in some fashion, including her brother, Olympian Bernard Lagat.

== College career ==
Lagat ran for the Malone University Pioneers where she was part of the 1999 NAIA Championship Cross Country team before becoming the individual NAIA Cross Country Champion in 2000. She later ran for the University of Toledo Rockets and the Washington State University Cougars. She finished 30th at the 2001 NCAA Division I Cross Country Championships.

== Professional career ==
Lagat was the winner of the US Classic 10 km in Atlanta, Georgia, on Sept. 1, 2008. She finished in first place with 34 minutes and 34 seconds, winning $4,500. She won the San Antonio Marathon on Nov. 14, 2010.

She got first place in the Rite Aid Cleveland Marathon Race in Cleveland, Ohio, on May 15, 2011. Just before, she had won the Indianapolis Half on May 7, 2011.

In 2011, she finished 2nd to Yihunlish Delelecha at Grandma's Marathon in Duluth, Minnesota, but she felt she had a shot at the title and planned her return once again (she was third in 2010). She also won the competitive Crim 10K in Flint, Michigan, on Aug. 27 that year.

On June 16, 2012, she was back at the Grandma's race. She finished first, with a time of 2 hours and 33 minutes and 14 seconds, taking home $11,250.

== Personal life ==
Everlyne comes from a family of runners: her older brother is Bernard Lagat, a two-time Olympic medalist (2000 and 2004 in the 1500m). Another brother, Robert Cheseret won the 2011 NACAC Cross Country Championships. Her younger sister is Viola Lagat, a two-time All-American at Florida State who placed second in the 2021 New York City Marathon.
