= 2009 NACAC Cross Country Championships =

- Organisers: NACAC
- Edition: 5th
- Date: March 7
- Host city: Orlando, Florida, United States
- Venue: Chain of Lakes Park
- Events: 4
- Distances: 8 km – Senior men 6 km – Junior men (U20); 6 km – Senior women 4 km – Junior women (U20)
- Participation: 86 (+ 6 guests) athletes from 7 nations

The 2009 NACAC Cross Country Championships took place on March 7, 2009. The races were held at the Chain of Lakes Park in Orlando, Florida, United States. A detailed report of the event was given.

Complete results were published.

== Medallists ==
Event	Gold		Silver		Bronze	
Individual
Senior men (8 km)	Stephen Pifer; United States	23:15	Dylan Wykes; Canada	23:30	Giliat Ghebray; United States	23:35
Junior (U20) men (6 km)	Ryan Hill; United States	17:55	Ryan Prentice; United States	18:01	Mohammed Ahmed; Canada	18:02
Senior women (6 km)	Clara Grandt; United States	20:11	Catherine Cormier; Canada	20:21	Kasie Enman; United States	20:23
Junior (U20) women (4 km)	Geneviève Lalonde; Canada	13:00	Natoya Goule; Jamaica	13:17	Emily Pritt; United States	13:18
Team
Senior men	United States	13	Canada	23	Jamaica	50
Junior (U20) men	United States	12	Canada	24	Jamaica	54
Senior women	United States	14	Canada	22	Jamaica	54
Junior (U20) women	Canada	16	United States	30	Jamaica	39

== Medal table (unofficial) ==
* Host nation (United States)

Rank	Nation	Gold	Silver	Bronze	Total
1	United States*	6	2	3	11
2	Canada	2	5	1	8
3	Jamaica	0	1	4	5
Totals (3 entries)		8	8	8	24

- Note: Totals include both individual and team medals, with medals in the team competition counting as one medal.

== Participation ==
According to an unofficial count, 86 athletes (+ 6 guests) from 7 countries participated.

- Bahamas (9)
- Bermuda (2)
- Canada (25 + 6 guests)
- Jamaica (16)
- Puerto Rico (12)
- Trinidad and Tobago (3)
- United States (19)

== See also ==
- 2009 in athletics (track and field)
