= Emperor Valley Zoo =

- Interactive map of Emperor Valley Zoo
- 10.6742°N 61.5187°W
- Date opened: 8 November 1952
- Location: Zoo Road, St. Clair, Port of Spain
- No. of animals: over 2300
- No. of species: over 200

The Emperor Valley Zoo is the only public zoo in Trinidad and Tobago. The 7.2-acre (2.91 ha) facility is located north of Queen's Park Savannah and west of the Royal Botanic Gardens, in Port of Spain.

The zoo first opened on 8 November 1952, operated then by Governor Sir Hubert Rance. At that time, there were 10 mediocre cages containing 127 animals, mainly indigenous species. The zoo now has a collection of over 2,300 animals from over 200 species.

The zoo was named after the large blue emperor (or morpho) butterfly, which once frequented the valley where the zoo is located in larger numbers.

The zoo's collection features both local and foreign animals, such as African giraffes and lions (in addition to several other large cats), Asian tigers, native caiman, ocelots, macaws (among other parrots) and waterfowl, as well as the national bird, the scarlet ibis. Different exhibits include small mammals, a reptile house, aquarium, a deer park, primates and gardens and ponds.

The zoo has undergone major upgrades over the past few years, both for upkeep to its existing infrastructure (to bring it up to international standards) as well as in-preparation for additions to and growth of its animal stock. These upgrades have been undertaken by the Zoological Society of Trinidad and Tobago (ZSTT) with financial assistance from the government of Trinidad and Tobago, to the value of TTD $56 Million.

During the upgrade periods, the zoo oversaw the construction of a refurbished giraffe enclosure, which was unveiled in December 2013, featuring two giraffes. The addition of a tiger exhibit received three tigers in 2014 - two white Bengals and a ginger Bengal. The white Bengal tigers have successfully bred, producing two healthy cubs in January 2015.

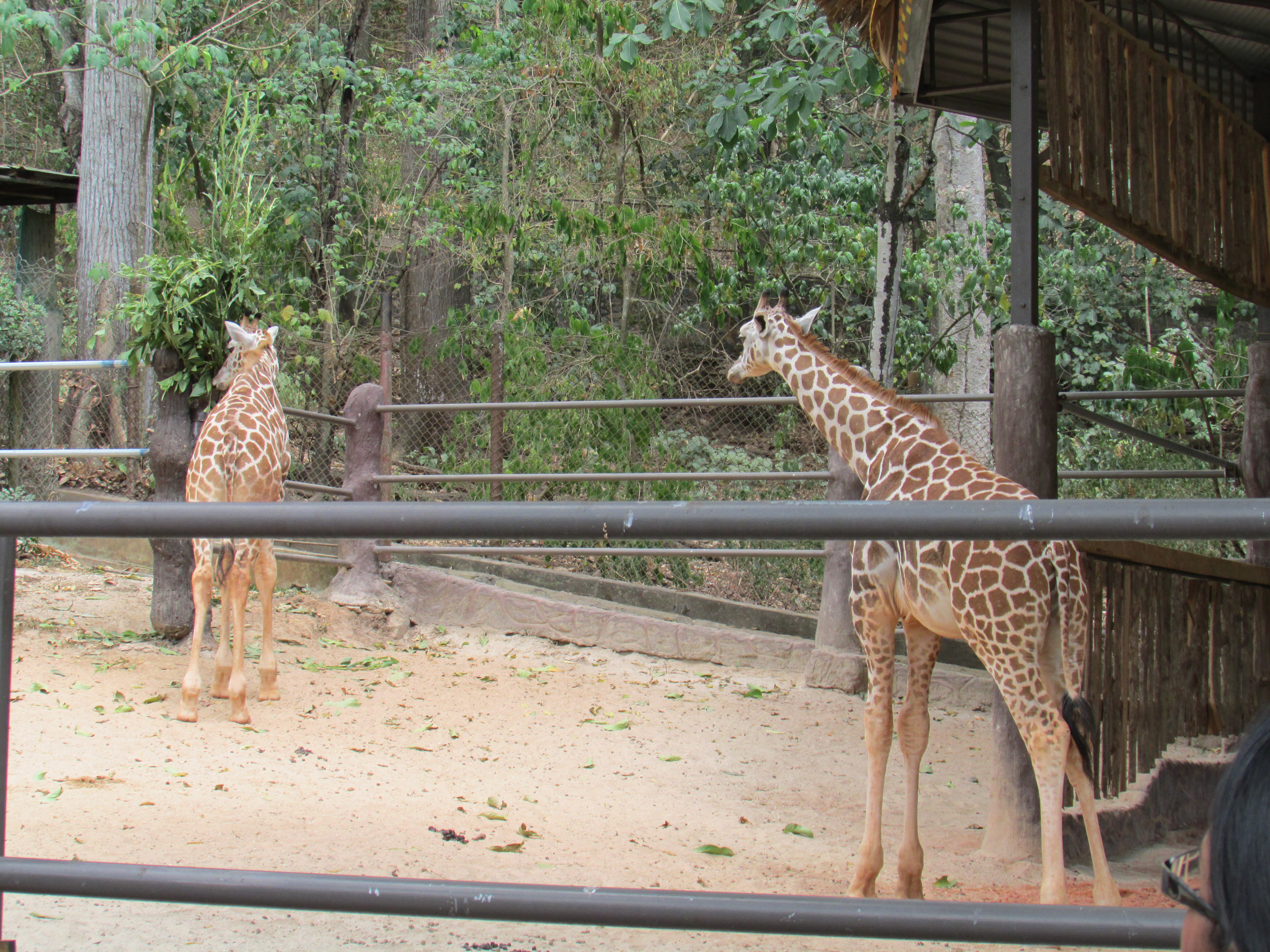
The two giraffes in their enclosure at the Emperor Valley Zoo. Part of the greater modernization and expansion of the zoo.

On 12 October 2016, the zoo announced that they had received six llamas from a nature park in Texas, USA. Zoo officials stated that, of the six llamas, four are female.

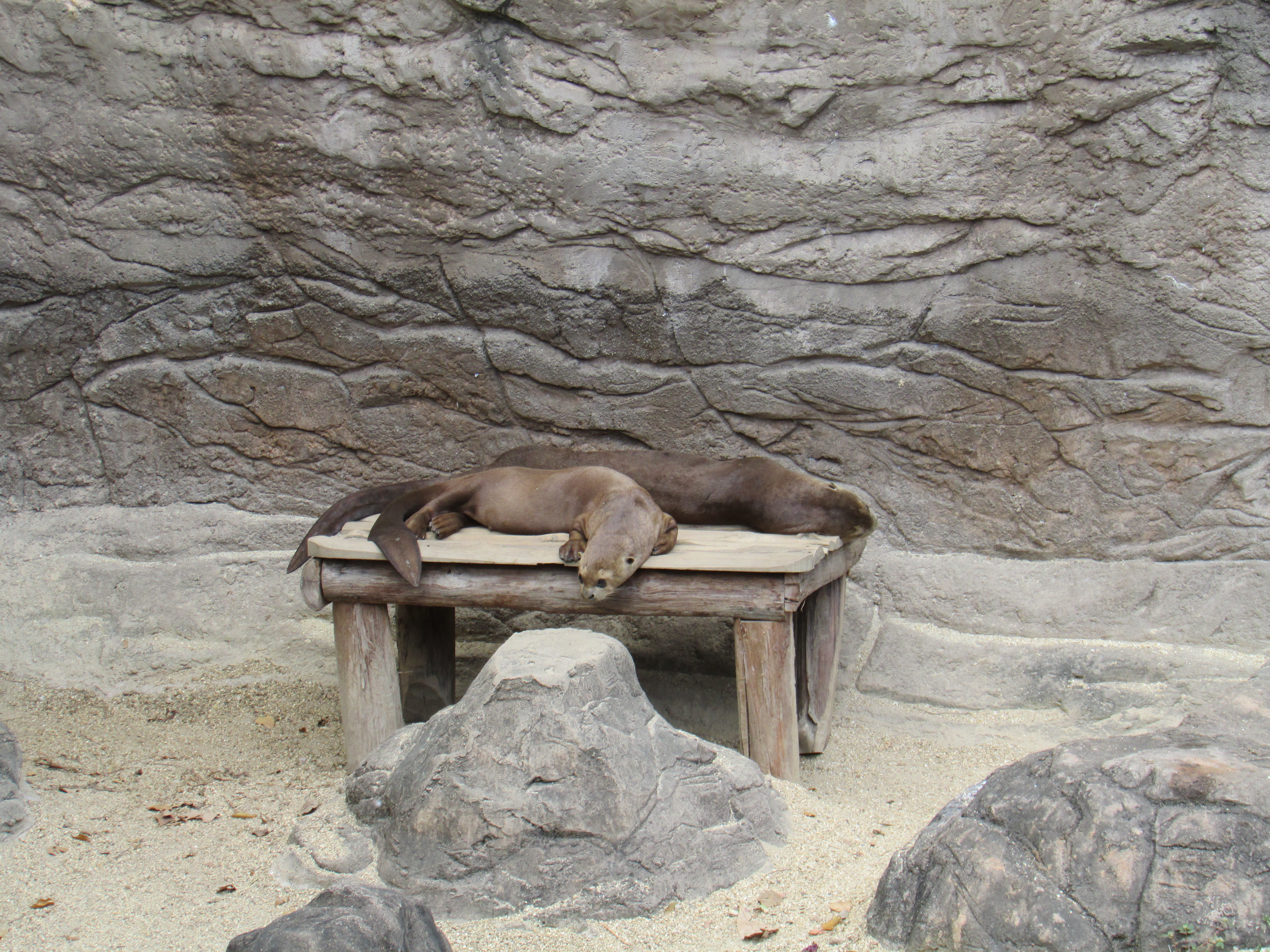
Giant River Otters at the Emperor Valley Zoo
