= Kasie Enman =

American ultra-marathoner

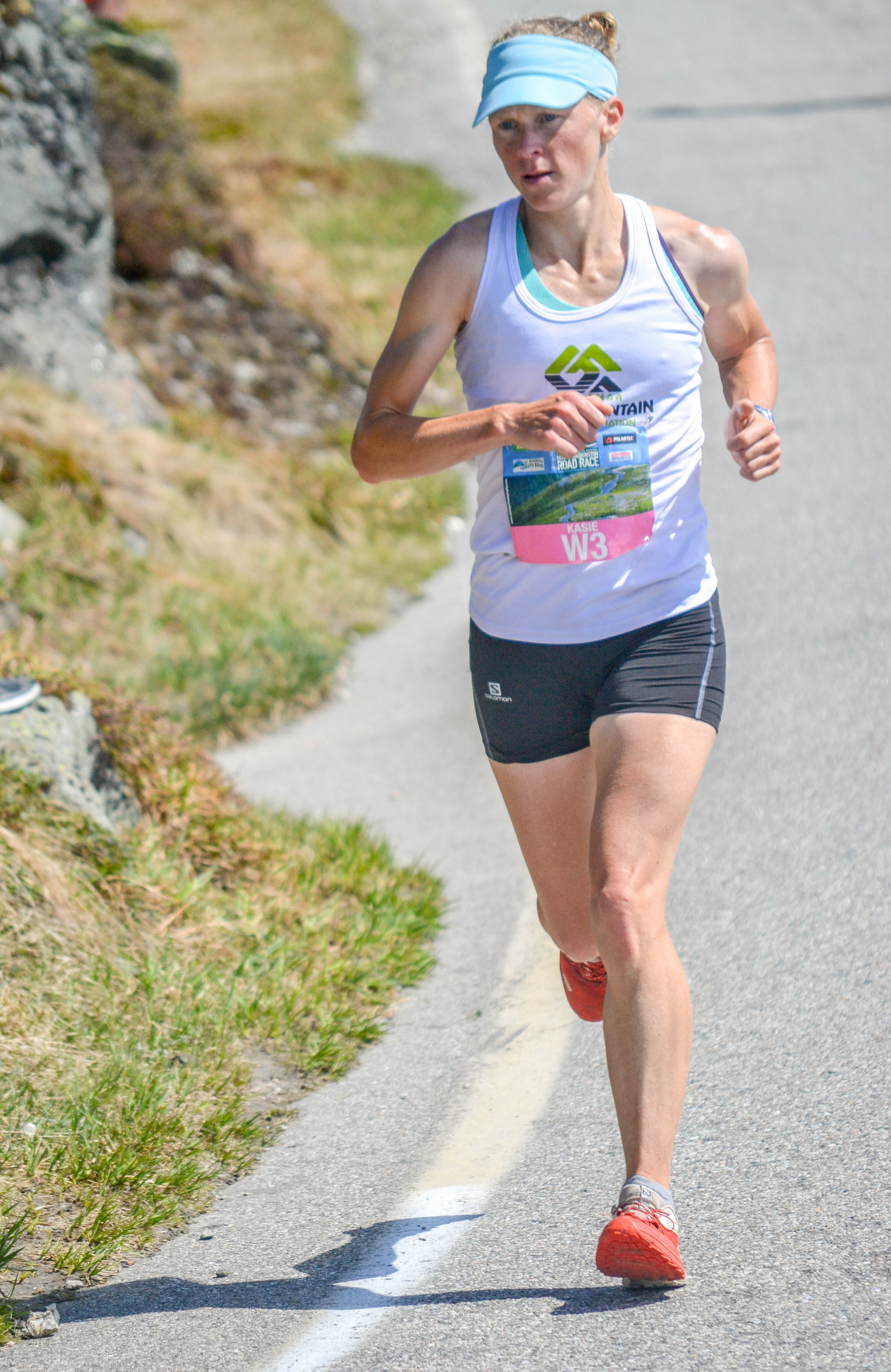

Personal information
- Full name: Kasie Wallace-Enman
- Nationality: American
- Born: 9 September 1979 (age 46)

Kasie Enman (born September 9, 1979) is an American female mountain runner and ultra-marathoner.

== Ultra career ==
Enman won individual bronze and team gold at the 2009 NACAC Cross Country Championships.

She won individual title at the 2011 World Mountain Running Championships.

In 2014, Enman won an event that was part of the Skyrunner World Series.

== Marathon career ==
She is a multiple time winner of the Vermont City Marathon.

== Coaching career ==
Enman is a coach at Champlain Valley Union High School.

== Personal life ==
She attended Middlebury College.
