= Yihunlish Delelecha =

Ethiopian long-distance runner

Medal record
Women's athletics
Representing Ethiopia
World Athletics Cross Country Championships
Silver medal – second place	1998 Marrakesh	Team

Yihunlish Delelecha (also known as Yihunelish Bekele Deleleneh; born October 22, 1981) is an Ethiopian-American distance runner who was a member of the 1998 World Athletics Cross Country Championship silver medal-winning team for Ethiopia.

== Professional career ==
Delelecha is known for participating in middle-distance and long-distance running. She got her start competing in cross country races for Ethiopia. She was 27th in the 1998 IAAF Cross Country Championships in Marrakesh, Morocco, as her team from Ethiopia (which included Kutre Dulecha, Genet Gebregiorgis and Alemitu Bekele Degfa) took silver.

Later, after she came to the United States, she was working at a 7-Eleven in the nation's capital. She decided to quit and try running professionally.

She made headlines in May 2011 when she ran the Dick's Sporting Goods Pittsburgh Marathon. Athletes prepped to race in the weekend festivities (one of whom was the Pittsburgh Mayor Luke Ravenstahl), and Delelecha focused on taking the top prize. As a light rain fell on the cool Sunday morning, she came through in top form, leading Serkalem Abrha, Tezeta Dengersa and Alemtsehay Misganaw (who had registered for the half marathon, but missed a turn and finished the full marathon—in second place—only to be disqualified). Delelecha's finishing time was a personal best 2:35:36.

She would finish third in the 2013 Pittsburgh race, when Mary Akor finished first and Hirut Guangul finished second. But the results would not stand for long. Guangul failed a drug test and her result was knocked out. Then Akor was suspended a few months later for having failed a drug test at a Mexican marathon. Akor's results at all her 2013 marathons were changed to disqualifications.

Thus, Delelecha became the fourth two-time women's winner of the marathon.

In June 2011, 38 days after winning in Pittsburgh, Delelecha won first place at the 35th Grandma's Marathon with the time of 02:30:39. A fellow countrywoman, Buzunesh Deba had introduced her to the race and encouraged her to try it. The day in 2011 started with rain, which stopped after the start of the race. There was a small tailwind and weather cool enough to see the breath of the runners along Lake Superior's North Shore. Delelecha ran with Everlyne Lagat until mile 19. Lagat finished second, while Dot McMahan came from behind to finish third.

November brought her to the city of brotherly love for the Philadelphia Half Marathon. She won, beating out 19-year-old Bekelech Bedada and Amanda Marino, a member of the 2009 NCAA Cross Country championship team from Villanova. Delelecha's time was a personal best 1:12:42.

She was third at the 2012 Houston Marathon, as Benita Willis edged her out near the finish and Alemitu Abera ran away with the lead, setting a course record.

In 2012, Delelecha ran the Cherry Blossom 10 Mile race in Washington D.C. Her time of 54:33 placed her third, behind winner Julliah Kerubo Tinega and second-place Malika Mejdoub.

That year, she was fourth at the Pittsburgh Half Marathon (while Fatuma Sado set a course record), third in her return to Grandma's Marathon (this time behind Everlyne Lagat and Mulu Seboka), fifth in the Twin Cities Marathon (behind Jeannette Faber) and fourth in the Philadelphia Half Marathon.

== Personal life ==
Delelecha resided in Waldorf, Maryland in 2011. She occasionally trained in Albuquerque, New Mexico, with a group of African athletes while preparing for races.

== Personal Best Performances ==
Discipline	Performance	Place	Date
5 Kilometres	16:58	Kenneth Square (USA)	18 MAY 2013
10 Kilometres	33:20	Rockville, MD (USA)	17 APR 2011
15 Kilometres	53:34	Le Puy-en-Velay (FRA)	01 MAY 2002
10 Miles Road	54:33	Washington, DC (USA)	01 APR 2012
20 Kilometres	1:12:16	New Haven, CT (USA)	07 SEP 2015
Half Marathon	1:12:43	Philadelphia, PA (USA)	20 NOV 2011
Marathon	2:30:38	Duluth, MN (USA)	18 JUN 2011
