= 2007 NACAC Cross Country Championships =

- Organisers: NACAC
- Edition: 3rd
- Date: March 3
- Host city: Clermont, Florida, United States
- Venue: United States Triathlon National Training Center
- Events: 4
- Distances: 8 km – Senior men 6 km – Junior men (U20); 6 km – Senior women 4 km – Junior women (U20)
- Participation: 124 athletes from 16 nations

The 2007 NACAC Cross Country Championships took place on March 3, 2007. The races were held at the United States Triathlon National Training Center in Clermont, Florida, United States. Detailed reports of the event were given.

Complete results were published.

== Medallists ==
Event	Gold		Silver		Bronze	
Individual
Senior men (8 km)	Fasil Bizuneh; United States	24:46.00	Celedon Rodriguez; United States	24:51.00	Michael Spence; United States	24:59.00
Junior (U20) men (6 km)	Diego Borrego (Mexico) México	18:50.00	Matthew Leeder; Canada	18:56.00	Matthew Hughes; Canada	19:28.00
Senior women (6 km)	Malindi Elmore; Canada	20:41.00	Korene Hinds; Jamaica	20:59.00	Desiraye Osburn; United States	21:06.00
Junior (U20) women (4 km)	Lindsay Carson; Canada	13:59.00	Marie-Louise Asselim; Canada	14:08.00	Aurora Scott; United States	14:20.00
Team
Senior men	United States	10 pts	Guatemala	58 pts	Canada	59 pts
Junior (U20) men	Canada	22 pts	United States	27 pts	Puerto Rico	62 pts
Senior women	Canada	21 pts	United States	41 pts	Jamaica	44 pts
Junior (U20) women	Canada	18 pts	United States	26 pts	Jamaica	45 pts

== Medal table (unofficial) ==
* Host nation (United States)

Rank	Nation	Gold	Silver	Bronze	Total
1	Canada (CAN)	5	2	2	9
2	United States (USA)*	2	4	3	9
3	Mexico (MEX)	1	0	0	1
4	Jamaica (JAM)	0	1	2	3
5	Guatemala (GUA)	0	1	0	1
6	Puerto Rico (PUR)	0	0	1	1
Totals (6 entries)		8	8	8	24

- Note: Totals include both individual and team medals, with medals in the team competition counting as one medal.

== Participation ==
According to an unofficial count, 124 athletes from 16 countries participated.

- Bahamas (4)
- Bermuda (1)
- Canada (24)
- Dominican Republic (4)
- /Guadeloupe (2)
- Guatemala (6)
- Jamaica (20)
- /Martinique (3)
- (Mexico) México (5)
- Nicaragua (1)
- Puerto Rico (24)
- Saint Lucia (2)
- Saint Vincent and the Grenadines (1)
- Trinidad and Tobago (10)
- United States (16)
- U.S. Virgin Islands (1)

== See also ==
- 2007 in athletics (track and field)
