= 2017 New York City Marathon =

47th annual marathon

47th New York City Marathon
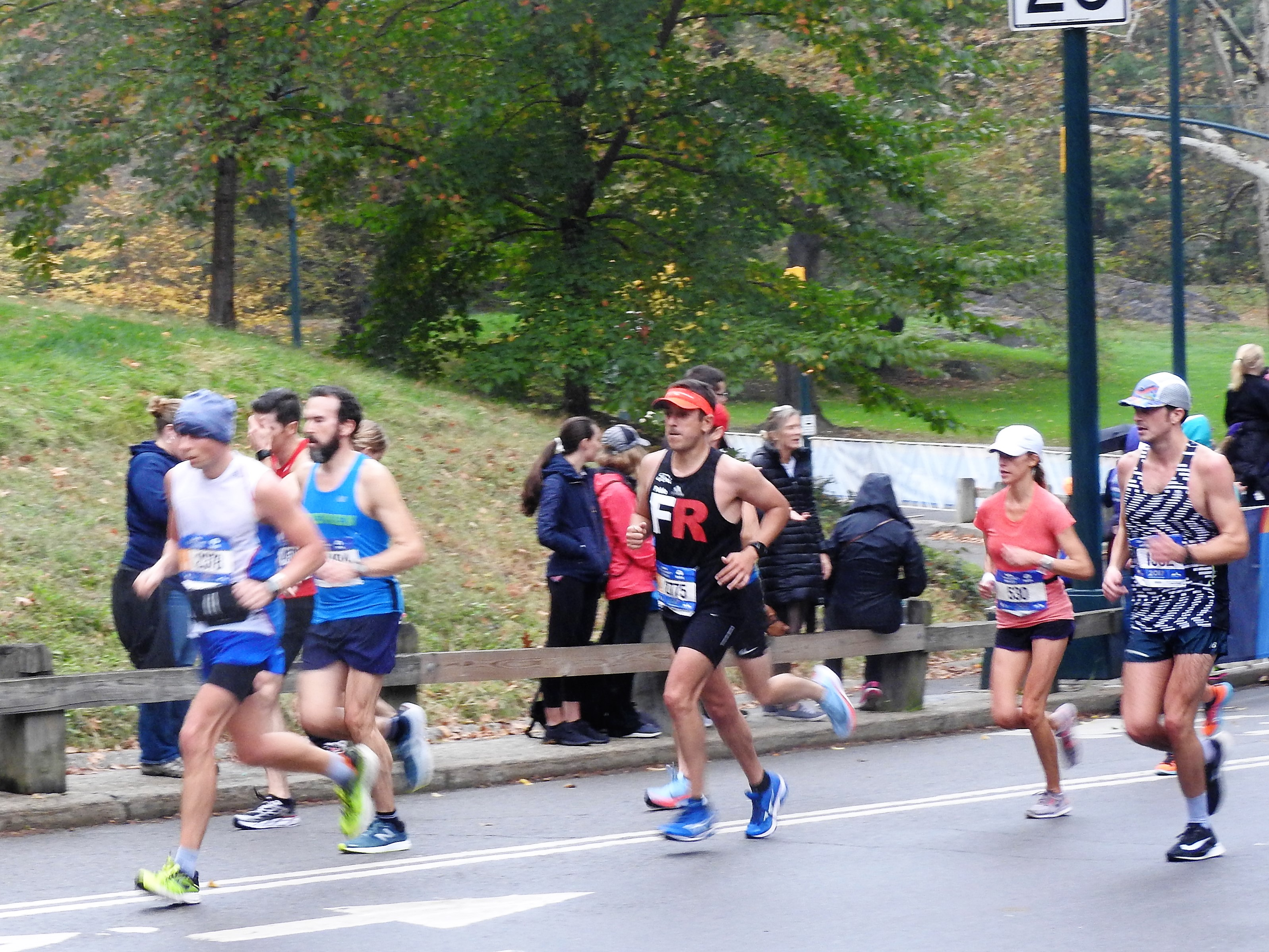
- Central Park
- Location: New York City, New York
- Date: November 5

Champions
- Men: Geoffrey Kamworor (2:10:53)
- Women: Shalane Flanagan (2:26:53)
- Wheelchair men: Marcel Hug (1:37:21)
- Wheelchair women: Manuela Schär (1:48:09)

The 2017 New York City Marathon was the 47th running of the annual marathon race in New York City, New York, which took place on November 5, 2017. The women's race was won by Shalane Flanagan, the first American woman to do so since Miki Gorman in 1977. The men's race was won by Kenyan Geoffrey Kamworor.

In the wheelchair races, Switzerland's Marcel Hug (1:37:21) and Manuela Schär (1:48:09) won the men's and women's races, respectively. The handcycle races were won by France's Ludovic Narce (1:28:48) and New Zealand's Tiffiney Perry (1:54:09).

A total of 50,643 runners finished the race, comprising 29,583 men and 21,060 women.

== Results ==
=== Men's race ===
Position	Athlete	Nationality	Time
1st place, gold medalist(s)	Geoffrey Kamworor	Kenya	2:10:53
2nd place, silver medalist(s)	Wilson Kipsang Kiprotich	Kenya	2:10:56
3rd place, bronze medalist(s)	Lelisa Desisa	Ethiopia	2:11:32
4	Lemi Berhanu Hayle	Ethiopia	2:11:52
5	Tadesse Abraham	Switzerland	2:12:01
6	Michel Butter	Netherlands	2:12:39
7	Abdihakem Abdirahman	United States	2:12:48
8	Koen Naert	Belgium	2:13:21
9	Fikadu Girma	Ethiopia	2:13:58
10	Shadrack Kiptoo Biwott	United States	2:14:57
11	Meb Keflezighi	United States	2:15:29
12	Jared Ward	United States	2:18:39
13	Guteta Senbeto	Ethiopia	2:20:29
14	Birhanu Dare	Ethiopia	2:21:30
15	Brendan Martin	United States	2:22:36
16	Harbert Okuti	Uganda	2:22:46
17	John Metui	Kenya	2:23:40
18	Girma Segni	Ethiopia	2:23:51
19	Francesco Puppi	Italy	2:25:35
—	Ghirmay Ghebreslassie	Eritrea	DNF
—	Bayron Piedra	Ecuador	DNF

=== Women's race ===
Position	Athlete	Nationality	Time
1st place, gold medalist(s)	Shalane Flanagan	United States	2:26:53
2nd place, silver medalist(s)	Mary Jepkosgei Keitany	Kenya	2:27:54
3rd place, bronze medalist(s)	Mamitu Daska	Ethiopia	2:28:08
4	Edna Kiplagat	Kenya	2:29:36
5	Allie Kieffer	United States	2:29:39
6	Sara Dossena	Italy	2:29:39
7	Eva Vrabcová-Nývltová	Czech Republic	2:29:41
8	Kellyn Taylor	United States	2:29:56
9	Diane Nukuri	United States	2:31:21
10	Stephanie Bruce	United States	2:31:44
11	Bizunesh Deba	Ethiopia	2:32:01
12	Christelle Daunay	France	2:32:09
13	Aliphine Tuliamuk	United States	2:33:18
14	Emma Quaglia	Italy	2:34:10
15	Serkalem Biset	Ethiopia	2:34:23
16	Askale Merachi	Ethiopia	2:36:38
17	Adriana Aparecida da Silva	Brazil	2:37:22
18	Jéssica Augusto	Portugal	2:37:33
19	Belaynesh Fikadu	Ethiopia	2:39:01
20	Lauren Knowles	United States	2:40:09
21	Angela Ortiz†	United States	2:42:52
22	Kaoru Nagao	Japan	2:44:26
23	Kate Pallardy	United States	2:44:48
24	Charlotte Karlsson	Sweden	2:45:52
25	Jeanne Mack†	United States	2:45:54
26	Beverly Ramos	Puerto Rico	2:46:45
27	Manuela Soccol	Belgium	2:47:04
28	Gloria Rita Giudici	Italy	2:47:30
29	Rachael Keller†	United States	2:47:37
30	Ana Johnson†	United States	2:49:39
—	Bose Gemeda	Ethiopia	DNF
—	Janet Collar	United States	DNF
—	Heather Lieberg	United States	DNF
—	Betsy Saina	Kenya	DNF

- † Ran in mass race

=== Wheelchair men ===
Position	Athlete	Nationality	Time
1st place, gold medalist(s)	Marcel Hug	Switzerland	1:37:21
2nd place, silver medalist(s)	JohnBoy Smith	United Kingdom	1:39:40
3rd place, bronze medalist(s)	Sho Watanabe	Japan	1:39:51
4	Ernst van Dyk	South Africa	1:39:56
5	Masazumi Soejima	Japan	1:39:58
6	Pierre Fairbank	France	1:39:58
7	Rafael Botello	Spain	1:40:01
8	Tomoki Suzuki	Japan	1:40:38
9	Josh Cassidy	Canada	1:41:08
10	Kota Hokinoue	Japan	1:42:27

=== Wheelchair women ===
Position	Athlete	Nationality	Time
1st place, gold medalist(s)	Manuela Schär	Switzerland	1:48:09
2nd place, silver medalist(s)	Tatyana McFadden	United States	1:51:02
3rd place, bronze medalist(s)	Amanda McGrory	United States	1:53:11
4	Zou Lihong	China	2:03:20
5	Madison de Rozario	Australia	2:04:28
6	Annika Zeyen	Germany	2:07:23
7	Katrina Gerhard	United States	2:07:27
8	Jade Jones-Hall	United Kingdom	2:08:33
9	Susannah Scaroni	United States	2:11:43
10	Arielle Rausin	United States	2:12:29

=== Handcycle men ===
Position	Athlete	Nationality	Time
1st place, gold medalist(s)	Ludovic Narce	France	1:28:48
2nd place, silver medalist(s)	Lars Hoffmann	Germany	1:28:57
3rd place, bronze medalist(s)	Fabio Faborges	Brazil	1:29:15
4	Vicente Yanguez	Spain	1:33:06
5	Matthew Robinson	United States	1:34:19

=== Handcycle women ===
Position	Athlete	Nationality	Time
1st place, gold medalist(s)	Tiffiney Perry	New Zealand	1:54:09
2nd place, silver medalist(s)	Devann Murphy	United States	2:20:59
3rd place, bronze medalist(s)	Beth Sanden	United States	2:43:02
4	Jessica Hayon	United States	2:58:36
5	Danielle Watson	United States	3:04:24
