= 2005 NACAC Cross Country Championships =

- Organisers: NACAC
- Edition: 1st
- Date: March 6
- Host city: Clermont, Florida, United States
- Venue: United States Triathlon National Training Center
- Events: 4
- Distances: 8 km – Senior men 6 km – Junior men (U20); 6 km – Senior women 4 km – Junior women (U20)
- Participation: 80 athletes from 13 nations

The 2005 NACAC Cross Country Championships took place on March 6, 2005. The races were held at the United States Triathlon National Training Center in Clermont, Florida, United States. A detailed report of the event was given.

Complete results were published.

== Medallists ==
Event	Gold		Silver		Bronze	
Individual
Senior men (8 km)	Juan Luis Barrios (Mexico) México	25:06	Alfredo Arévalo; Guatemala	25:16	Max King; United States	25:34
Junior (U20) men (6 km)	Dave Mock; United States	19:51	Timothy McLeod; United States	19:58	Drew Shackleton; United States	20:03
Senior women (6 km)	Sabrina Monro; United States	21:40	Lucinda Hull; United States	21:52	Erika Aklufi; United States	21:55
Junior (U20) women (4 km)	Jennifer Barringer; United States	14:50	Christina Fidducia; United States	15:06	Emily Harrison; United States	15:10
Team
Senior men	United States	16	Puerto Rico	22	Jamaica	40
Junior (U20) men	United States	10	Puerto Rico	33	Jamaica	35
Senior women	United States	10				
Junior (U20) women	United States	10	Puerto Rico	31	Jamaica	37

== Medal table (unofficial) ==
* Host nation (United States)

Rank	Nation	Gold	Silver	Bronze	Total
1	United States (USA)*	7	3	4	14
2	Mexico (MEX)	1	0	0	1
3	Puerto Rico (PUR)	0	3	0	3
4	Guatemala (GUA)	0	1	0	1
5	Jamaica (JAM)	0	0	3	3
Totals (5 entries)		8	7	7	22

- Note: Totals include both individual and team medals, with medals in the team competition counting as one medal.

== Participation ==
According to an unofficial count, 80 athletes from 13 countries participated.

- Bermuda (1)
- Costa Rica (1)
- Dominican Republic (2)
- Guatemala (3)
- Honduras (1)
- Jamaica (18)
- /Martinique (5)
- (Mexico) México (4)
- Nicaragua (1)
- Puerto Rico (18)
- Saint Lucia (1)
- Saint Vincent and the Grenadines (2)
- United States (23)

== See also ==
- 2005 in athletics (track and field)
