= NACAC Cross Country Championships =

- Sport: Cross country running
- Founded: 2005
- Continent: North America, Central America and the Caribbean (NACAC)

The NACAC Cross Country Championships is an annual regional cross country running competition for athletes representing member nations of the North America, Central America and Caribbean Athletic Association (NACAC). The event was inaugurated in 2005 and was held in Florida, United States until 2009. The following two editions were held in Trinidad and Tobago.

The event comprises four separate races: an 8 km senior men's race, a 6 km senior women's race, a 6 km junior men's race and finally a 4 km junior women's race.

Between 1983-2003, the event was preceded by the Central American and Caribbean Cross Country Championships organized by the Central American and Caribbean Athletic Confederation (CACAC).

The 2020 edition was held in conjunction with the 2020 Pan American Cross Country Cup. The 2021 edition was postponed to 10 December 2022 in Honduras, but was not ultimately held. As of 2024, the meeting has not been held since 2019 and is not scheduled in the NACAC 2024-2026 calendar.

== Editions ==
Edition	Year	Venue	City	Country	No. of athletes	No. of nations
1st	2005	United States Triathlon National Training Center	Clermont, Florida	United States	80	13
2nd	2006	United States Triathlon National Training Center	Clermont, Florida	United States	122	14
3rd	2007	United States Triathlon National Training Center	Clermont, Florida	United States	124^{†}	16
4th	2008	Disney's Wide World of Sports Complex	Orlando, Florida	United States	64	6
5th	2009	Chain of Lakes Park	Orlando, Florida	United States	86 + 6 guests	7
7th	2010	Mount Irvine Bay Golf Course	Mount Irvine, Tobago	Trinidad and Tobago	107	11
8th	2011	Queen's Park Savannah	Port of Spain	Trinidad and Tobago	118^{†}	19
9th	2012	Queen's Park Savannah	Port of Spain	Trinidad and Tobago	108 + 1 guest	12
10th	2013	Manchester Golf Club	Mandeville	Jamaica	114	8
11th	2014	Mount Irvine Bay Golf Course	Mount Irvine, Tobago	Trinidad and Tobago	103	10
12th	2015		Barranquilla, Atlántico	Colombia		
13th	2016	Campo de Golf de Caraballeda	Caraballeda, Venezuela	Venezuela		
14th	2017	South County Regional Park.	Boca Raton, Florida, United States	United States		
15th	2018	Park	San Salvador, El Salvador	El Salvador		
16th	2019	Queens Park Savannah, Puerto España	Port of Spain, Trinidad	Trinidad and Tobago		

^{†}: The number of athletes and number of nations are according to unofficial counts within complete results lists. The higher numbers that were published could also comprise coaches and/or officials.

== Champions ==
Year	Men's senior race		Women's senior race	
Year	Individual	Team	Individual	Team
2005	Juan Luis Barrios (MEX)	United States (USA)	Sabrina Monro (USA)	United States (USA)
2006	Juan Luis Barrios (MEX)	Mexico (MEX)	Megan Metcalfe (CAN)	United States (USA)
2007	Fasil Bizuneh (USA)	United States (USA)	Malindi Elmore (CAN)	Canada (CAN)
2008	Thomas Morgan (USA)	United States (USA)	Carmen Douma-Hussar (CAN)	Canada (CAN)
2009	Stephen Pifer (USA)	United States (USA)	Clara Grandt (USA)	United States (USA)
2010	Max King (USA)	United States (USA)	Delilah DiCrescenzo (USA)	United States (USA)
2011	Robert Cheseret (USA)	United States (USA)	Kate Harrison (CAN)	United States (USA)
2012	Cameron Levins (CAN)	United States (USA)	Liz Costello (USA)	United States (USA)
2013	Craig Forys (USA)	United States (USA)	Natasha Fraser (CAN)	Canada (CAN)
2014	Joseph Gray (USA)	United States (USA)	Kellyn Johnson (USA)	United States (USA)
2015	Maksim Korolev (USA)	United States (USA)	Gladys Tejeda (PER)	United States (USA)
2016	Donald Cowart (USA)	United States (USA)	Allison Grace Morgan (USA)	United States (USA)
2017	Abbabiya Simbassa (USA)	United States (USA)	Sasha Gollish (CAN)	Canada (CAN)
2018	Joseph Gray (USA)	United States (USA)	Carmen Toaquiza (ECU)	Peru (PER)

== See also ==
- American Championships
