= 2006 NACAC Cross Country Championships =

- Organisers: NACAC
- Edition: 2nd
- Date: March 11
- Host city: Clermont, Florida, United States
- Venue: United States Triathlon National Training Center
- Events: 4
- Distances: 8 km – Senior men 6 km – Junior men (U20); 6 km – Senior women 4 km – Junior women (U20)
- Participation: 122 athletes from 14 nations

The 2006 NACAC Cross Country Championships took place on March 11, 2006. The races were held at the United States Triathlon National Training Center in Clermont, Florida, United States. A detailed report of the event was given.

Complete results were published.

== Medallists ==
Event	Gold		Silver		Bronze	
Individual
Senior men (8 km)	Juan Luis Barrios (Mexico) México	25:17	Alejandro Suárez (Mexico) México	25:17	Max King; United States	25:49
Junior (U20) men (6 km)	Diego Borrego (Mexico) México	19:25	Aaron Arias (Mexico) México	19:30	Landon Peacock; United States	19:30
Senior women (6 km)	Megan Metcalfe; Canada	21:45	María Elena Valencia (Mexico) México	21:55	Rebecca Donaghue; United States	21:57
Junior (U20) women (4 km)	Kate van Buskirk; Canada	14:32	Sheila Reid; Canada	14:39	Kauren Tarver; United States	14:41
Team
Senior men	(Mexico) México	16 pts	United States	31 pts	Guatemala	48 pts
Junior (U20) men	United States	22 pts	Canada	34 pts	Puerto Rico	73 pts
Senior women	United States	18 pts	Canada	37 pts	Jamaica	76 pts
Junior (U20) women	United States	19 pts	Canada	22 pts	Jamaica	61 pts

== Medal table (unofficial) ==
* Host nation (United States)

Rank	Nation	Gold	Silver	Bronze	Total
1	Mexico (MEX)	3	3	0	6
2	United States (USA)*	3	1	4	8
3	Canada (CAN)	2	4	0	6
4	Jamaica (JAM)	0	0	2	2
5	Guatemala (GUA)	0	0	1	1
5	Puerto Rico (PUR)	0	0	1	1
Totals (6 entries)		8	8	8	24

- Note: Totals include both individual and team medals, with medals in the team competition counting as one medal.

== Participation ==
According to an unofficial count, 122 athletes from 14 countries participated.

- Bahamas (2)
- Bermuda (1)
- Canada (22)
- Costa Rica (2)
- Dominican Republic (4)
- Guatemala (10)
- Jamaica (19)
- /Martinique (3)
- (Mexico) México (12)
- Puerto Rico (21)
- Trinidad and Tobago (4)
- Turks and Caicos Islands (1)
- United States (19)
- U.S. Virgin Islands (2)

== See also ==
- 2006 in athletics (track and field)
