= Dylan Wykes =

Canadian long-distance runner

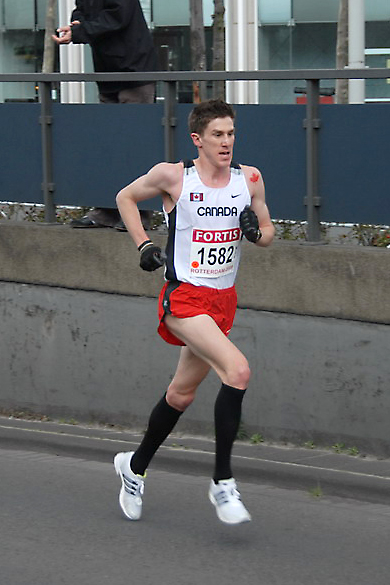
- Wykes at the 2008 Rotterdam Marathon

Personal information
- Born: June 6, 1983 (age 43) Kingston, Ontario, Canada
- Home town: Ottawa, Ontario
- Height: 6 ft 1 in (1.85 m)
- Weight: 155 lb (70 kg)

Sport
- Sport: Running
- Events: 10,000 metres, Half Marathon, Marathon

Dylan Wykes (born June 6, 1983) is a Canadian long-distance runner. He represented Canada in the marathon at the 2009 IAAF World Championships in Athletics in Berlin, Germany as well as the 2012 Summer Olympics in London, England. In April 2012, Wykes ran the Rotterdam Marathon in a time of 2:10:47 and qualified for the 2012 Summer Olympics. With this mark, he is currently the third fastest Canadian marathoner of all time.

== Early life ==
Wykes was born and raised in Kingston, Ontario, where he attended Frontenac Secondary School. He competed successfully throughout high school, winning the provincial high school (OFSAA) cross country championships in 2001 as well as the 3000m at the 1998, 2000 and 2001 OFSAA track & field championships. He also won the junior race at the 2002 Canadian Cross Country Championships in Moncton, New Brunswick. Following high school, Wykes attended Providence College in Providence, Rhode Island. Under the coaching of Ray Treacy, he competed in several NCAA cross country and track & field championships. Wykes finished 49th at the 2003 cross country championships and 15th in the 3000m at the 2004 indoor track championships.

== Career ==
In 2008, at the age of 24, Wykes ran 2:15:16 and finished 16th at the Fortis Rotterdam Marathon, his debut performance at the distance. The time was the second fastest by a Canadian in 2008, surpassed only by Olympian Jon Brown's 2:12 performance at the Fukuoka Marathon, and one of the fastest marathon debuts in Canadian history. In the fall of the same year, Wykes ran the Scotiabank Toronto Waterfront Marathon, and placed 11th in a time of 2:16:20. In 2009, he represented Canada in the marathon at the World Championships and finished 33rd in 2:18:00.

In his fourth effort at the distance in December 2010, Wykes won the Sacramento International Marathon. He led the race from start to finish and set a new personal best of 2:12:39, proving himself a contender to represent Canada at the 2012 London Olympic Games. After two failed attempts at reaching the Canadian Olympic standard of 2:11:29, Wykes surpassed the mark at the 2012 Rotterdam Marathon. He finished 7th in the race with a time of 2:10:47, currently the second fastest marathon of all time by a Canadian. Wykes concluded his 2012 season at the London Olympics where he finished as the top Canadian and 20th overall in the marathon.

Wykes has also represented Canada internationally in cross country. He ran as a junior at the 2002 World Cross Country Championships and as a senior at the 2007 championships. He placed 3rd at both the 2007 and 2008 Canadian Cross Country Championships and finished 3rd at the 2008 and 2nd at the 2009 NACAC Cross Country Championships.

Wykes continues to improve his track ability, and set personal bests in both the 5000 metres and 10000 metres in the early part of 2011.

== Personal bests ==
Event	Time	Venue	Date
1500 metres	3:46.1	Vancouver, British Columbia, Canada	2007
Mile	4:01.15	Boston, Massachusetts, United States	February 7, 2004
3000 metres	7:58.7	Boston, Massachusetts, United States	January 31, 2004
5000 metres	13:43.43	Eugene, Oregon, United States	April 22, 2011
10000 metres	28:12.82	Stanford, California, United States	May 1, 2011
Half Marathon	1:02:14	New York City, New York, United States	March 20, 2011
Marathon	2:10:47	Rotterdam, Netherlands	April 15, 2012

== Achievements ==
Year	Competition	Venue	Position	Event	Notes
2009	World Championships	Berlin, Germany	33rd	Marathon	2:18:00
2010	California International Marathon	Sacramento, California, United States	1st	Marathon	2:12:39
2011	Scotiabank Toronto Waterfront Marathon	Toronto, Ontario, Canada	6th	Marathon	2:12:56.1
2012	ABN AMRO Rotterdam Marathon	Rotterdam, Netherlands	7th	Marathon	2:10:47
2012	London Olympic Marathon	London, England	20th	Marathon	2:15:26
