= Robert Cheseret =

Kenyan-born US long-distance runner (b. 1983)

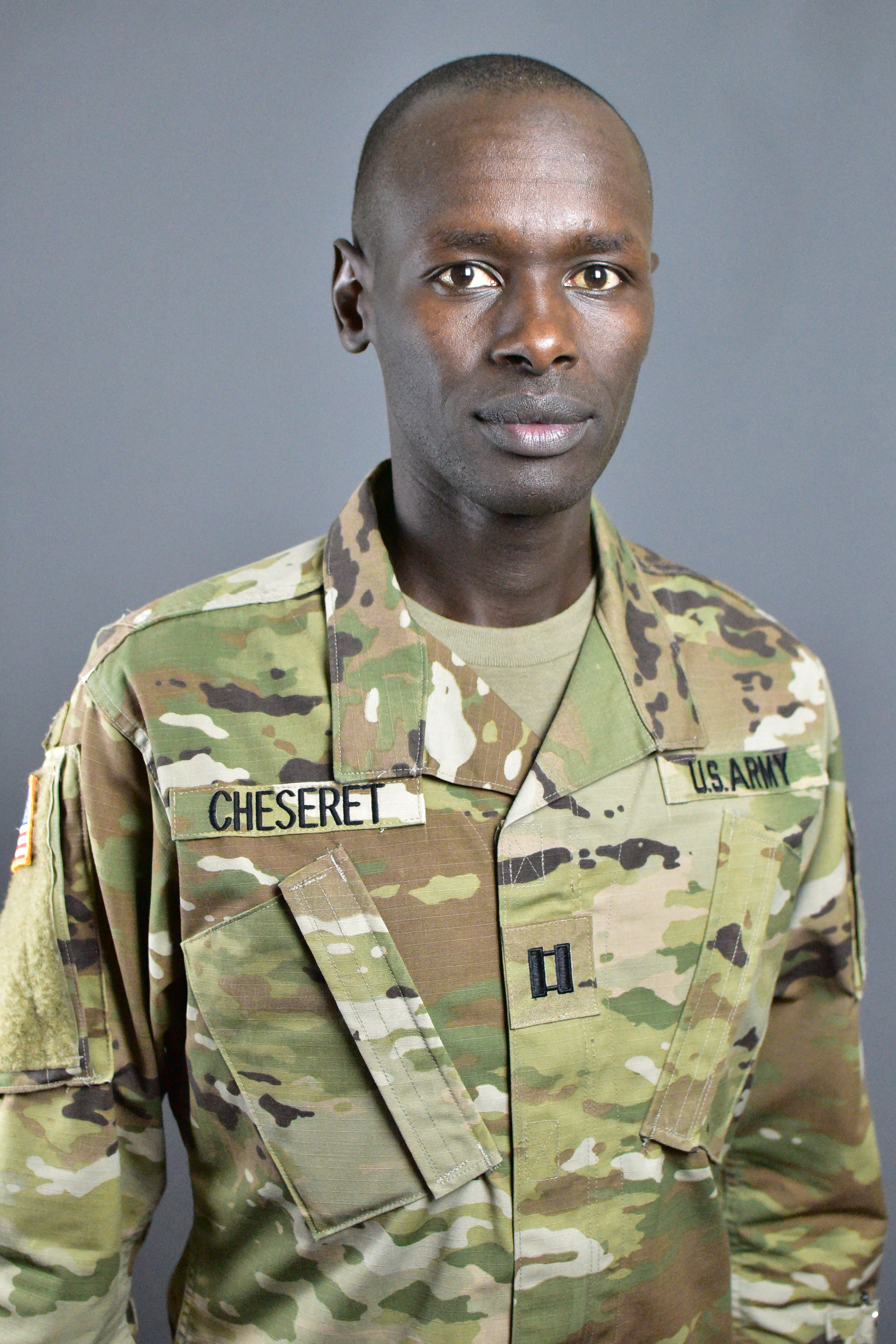
- Captain Cheseret in 2017

Personal information
- Born: October 8, 1983 (age 43) Kapsabet, Nandi District, Kenya

Sport
- Sport: Athletics
- Event: Long-distance running
- Club: U.S. Army

Achievements and titles
- Personal bests: 10,000 m – 28:20.11 (2005); HM – 1:04:14 (2016); Mar – 2:18:59 (2017)

Robert Cheseret (born October 8, 1983) is a Kenyan-born American long-distance runner. He is the younger brother of Bernard Lagat and older brother to Violah and Everlyne Lagat. Cheseret won the 2011 NACAC Cross Country Championships.

Cheseret enrolled at the University of Arizona, majoring in business. He was the 2004, 2005, and 2006 Pac-10 Champion and runner of the year. Cheseret became the first Pac-10 athlete to earn Track Athlete of the Year honors three times. He successfully defended his Pac-10 titles in 5000 meters (13:47.50) and 10,000 meters (30:32.92). He also added a Pac-10 title in 1500 meters (3:41.88) to give him a total of eight Pac-10 titles during his career – the most ever by a Pac-10 track and field athlete.

In his junior year he defended his Pac-10 title when he finished in 23:57 (8000 meter run) to become the second Arizona runner, and ninth runner in Pac-10 history, to win back-to-back conference titles. Cheseret went on to capture the NCAA West Regional individual crown (with 30:03 for the 10,000 meter) and was the Pac-10's top finisher at the NCAA Championships with a tenth-place finish (29:51 for the 10,000 meter).

He joined the U.S. Army in 2009, training in the army's World Class Athlete Program to qualify for the 2012 London Olympics. This put in place the steps towards gaining U.S. citizenship.
