= 2011 NACAC Cross Country Championships =

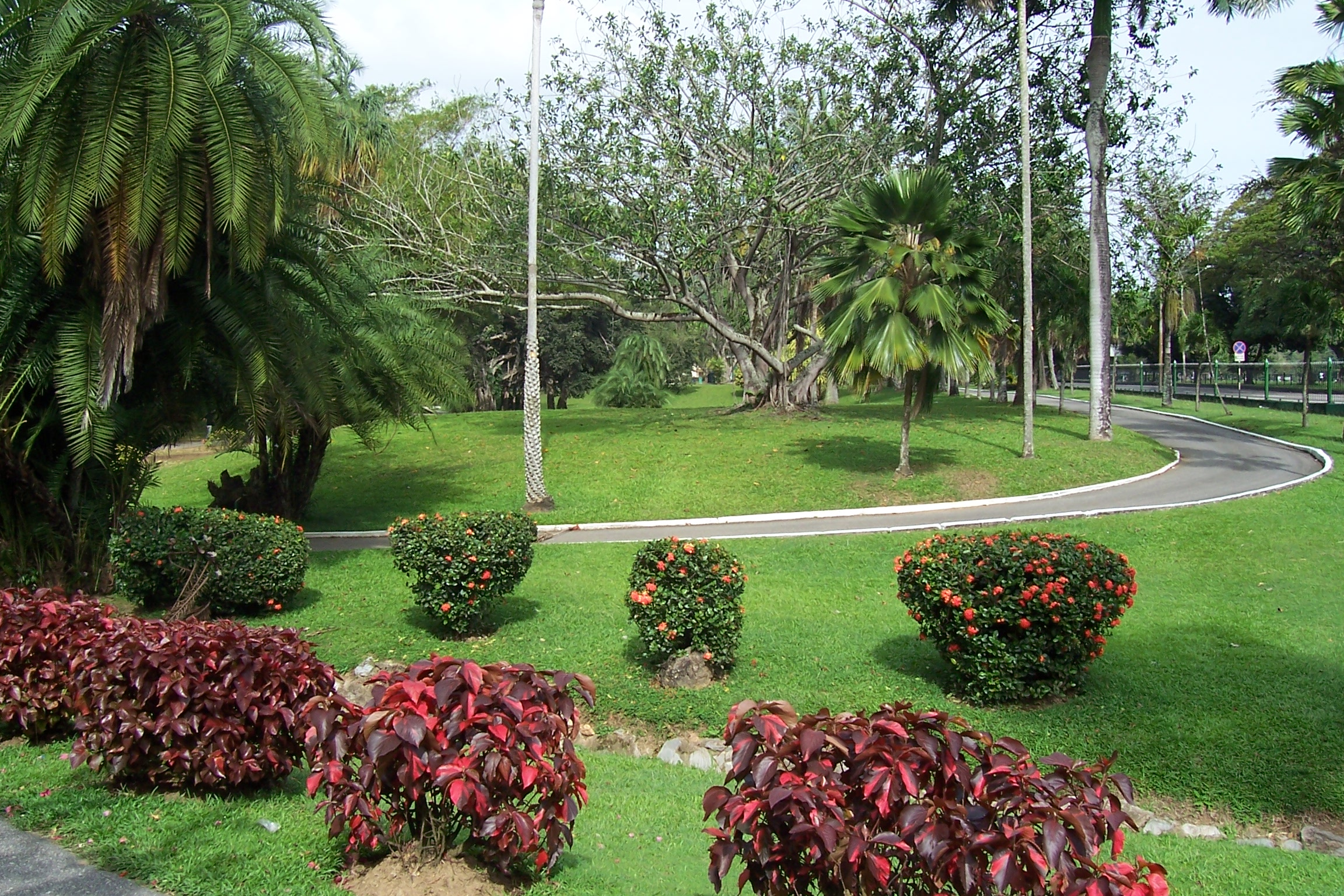
- Organisers: NACAC
- Edition: 7th
- Date: February 19
- Host city: Port of Spain, Trinidad and Tobago
- Venue: Queen's Park Savannah
- Events: 4
- Distances: 8 km – Senior men 6 km – Junior men (U20); 6 km – Senior women 4 km – Junior women (U20)
- Participation: 118 athletes from 19 nations

The 2011 NACAC Cross Country Championships was the seventh edition of the continental cross country running competition which took place on February 19 at Queen's Park Savannah in Port of Spain, Trinidad and Tobago. A total of 166 athletes took part in the event, hailing from a record high of 20 nations within the North America, Central America and Caribbean region.

The competition featured four races: an 8 km senior men's race, a 6 km senior women's race, a 6 km junior (under-20s) men's race and a 4 km junior women's race. The course for the championships followed a 2-kilometer grassy loop and was relatively flat throughout. Kenyan-born runner Robert Cheseret won the senior men's gold for the United States and also led the Americans to the team title. Canadian Kathryn Harrison secured the senior women's title, but the United States took the overall senior women's gold medals. Ross Proudfoot led a Canadian sweep of the medals in the junior men's race, while American Chelsea Orr was the junior women's gold medalist.

== Medallists ==
Complete results were published.

=== Individual ===
Event	Gold		Silver		Bronze	
Senior men's 8 km	Robert Cheseret (USA)	23:43 min	Cameron Levins (CAN)	23:46 min	Colin Leak (USA)	23:51 min
Senior women's 6 km	Kathryn Harrison (CAN)	20:19 min	Megan Duwell (USA)	20:22 min	Kim Conley (USA)	20:24 min
Junior men's 6 km	Ross Proudfoot (CAN)	18:27 min	Connor Darlington (CAN)	18:29 min	Paul Janikowski (CAN)	18:29 min
Junior women's 4 km	Chelsea Orr (USA)	13:54 min	Fiona Benson (CAN)	14:00 min	Maria Bernard (CAN)	14:02 min

=== Team ===
Event	Gold		Silver		Bronze	
Senior men's 8 km	United States (USA)	15 pts	Canada (CAN)	37 pts	Trinidad and Tobago (TRI)	86 pts
Senior women's 6 km	United States (USA)	14 pts	Canada (CAN)	30 pts	Trinidad and Tobago (TRI)	68 pts
Junior men's 6 km	Canada (CAN)	12 pts	United States (USA)	37 pts	Puerto Rico (PUR)	56 pts
Junior women's 4 km	Canada (CAN)	15 pts	United States (USA)	30 pts	Puerto Rico (PUR)	61 pts

== Medal table (unofficial) ==
* Host nation (Trinidad and Tobago)

Rank	Nation	Gold	Silver	Bronze	Total
1	Canada	4	5	2	11
2	United States	4	3	2	9
3	Puerto Rico	0	0	2	2
Totals (3 entries)		8	8	6	22

- Note: Totals include both individual and team medals, with medals in the team competition counting as one medal.

== Participation ==
According to an unofficial count, 121 athletes from 19 countries participated.

- Bahamas (2)
- Belize (1)
- Bermuda (8)
- Canada (21)
- Cayman Islands (1)
- Costa Rica (1)
- Dominican Republic (4)
- El Salvador (2)
- Grenada (2)
- Guatemala (1)
- Guyana (7)
- Jamaica (13)
- (Mexico) México (7)
- Nicaragua (1)
- Puerto Rico (12)
- Saint Lucia (4)
- Saint Vincent and the Grenadines (4)
- Trinidad and Tobago (11)
- United States (19)

== See also ==
- 2011 in athletics (track and field)
