= Carmen Douma-Hussar =

Canadian middle-distance runner

Medal record

Women's athletics

Representing Canada

World Indoor Championships
Silver medal – second place	2004 Budapest	1500 m

World Cross Country Championships
Bronze medal – third place	2004 Brussels	Short race team

Carmen Douma-Hussar (born March 12, 1977) is a Canadian middle-distance runner. She is a member of the Guelph Track and Field Club and is coached by Marcus O'Sullivan and Albert Tschirhart. She was the silver medalist in the 1500 m at the 2004 IAAF World Indoor Championships.

Douma-Hussar was a 1500 m finalist at the 2004 Summer Olympics, 2005 World Championships in Athletics and the 2006 Commonwealth Games. She represented Canada in the short race at the IAAF World Cross Country Championships six times between 2001 and 2006. Her best performance of 17th in 2004 brought Canada the team bronze medal. She has also competed at the 2007 World Championships in Athletics, the 2006 IAAF World Cup and four editions of the IAAF World Athletics Final. She was a three-time NCAA champion while studying at Villanova University.

== Career ==
=== Early life and career ===
Born in Cambridge, Ontario, she attended Villanova University and represented the Villanova Wildcats in college athletics. In NCAA competition, she won three individual titles: in 1998 she won the NCAA indoor title in the mile run and the outdoor title over 1500 meters, then took another indoor mile title in 2000. She received NCAA All-America honours on nine occasions and was highly successful in the regional Big East Conference, taking fifteen individual championship victories for the Wildcats. She graduated with a major in education at the end of 2000. From 2000 to 2008 she served as a volunteer assistant coach for Villanova.

Douma-Hussar made her international debut for Canada the following year at the 2001 IAAF World Cross Country Championships, placing 69th in the short race. She improved upon this at the 2002 short race with a 53rd-place finish. In the 2002 track season she improved her indoor mile best to 4:38.02 minutes to win at the Gator Invitational then set an outdoor best of 4:37.55 minutes in Falmouth. She also set a 1500 m best of 4:14.60 minutes at the Georgia Tech Invitational. She was 37th at the 2003 World Cross Country and greatly improved her track bests. She was third in the mile at both the New Balance Games and Boston Indoor Games, setting a best of 4:35.94 minutes. She won the 1500 m at the Harry Jerome Classic with a new personal record of 4:08.09 minutes and won the national title in that event a month later.

=== Canadian records and world medalist ===
The 2004 season proved to be a breakout year for Douma-Hussar. She had her best cross country finish at the 2004 World Championships, where her 17th place helped a Canadian team including Émilie Mondor, Malindi Elmore and Tina Connelly take the bronze medal in the short race. She won the 1500 m at the Boston Indoor Games and the Millrose Games and gained selection for the event at the 2004 IAAF World Indoor Championships. She made it to the final and ran a Canadian indoor record time of 4:08.18 minutes to take the silver medal behind Kutre Dulecha. She focused solely on the 1500 m track event and travelled to compete on the European outdoor track and field circuit. She won at the FBK Games in the Netherlands with a personal best of 4:04.85 minutes and was runner-up at the London Grand Prix. She was second at the national championships and was selected for the Canadian Olympic team for the first time. Her form peaked at the 2004 Athens Olympics as she made it to the final and ran a personal record time of 4:02.31 minutes to take ninth place. She ended the season with a fifth-place finish at the 2005 IAAF World Athletics Final.

She began 2005 by breaking her second national record: her winning run of 4:28.43 minutes in New York was a Canadian indoor record for the mile. She also won the mile at the Millrose Games. Douma-Hussar was Canada's best performer at the 2005 IAAF World Cross Country Championships, coming 25th in the short race. She won the 1500 m outdoor national title and went on to take ninth place at the 2005 World Championships in Athletics. Two weeks after the final she ran a life-time best of 4:02.29 minutes at the Rieti Meeting. At the 2006 IAAF World Athletics Final she ran in both the 1500 m and the 3000 meters, coming fourth in the former event and setting a best of 8:53.83 minutes in the latter. In her first major road outing, she won the women's title at the Fifth Avenue Mile in September ahead of Amy Rudolph.

=== Commonwealth Games and 2007 World Championships ===
After two indoor wins over the mile in Boston and New York, she headed to Australia and won the 1500 m at the Melbourne Track Classic. However, she was not in peak form for the 2006 Commonwealth Games held in the city that month and she lost out in a tactical 1500 m, coming in fifth place. In the final short race to be held at the 2006 IAAF World Cross Country Championships, she managed 22nd place and the removal of the event from future programmes brought an end to Douma-Hussar's participation at the competition. On the outdoor track circuit she had a season's best of 4:03.82 for the 1500 m at the Meeting Gaz de France in Paris and won the national title. She was seventh in the event at the 2006 IAAF World Athletics Final and sixth at the 2006 IAAF World Cup. In 2007, with a year's best run of 4:05.91 minutes, she was chosen for the 2007 World Championships in Athletics, but was eliminated in the first round. Despite this disappointment, she ran a lifetime best of 4:26.76 minutes for the mile two weeks later at the Memorial Van Damme in Belgium and came sixth at the 2007 IAAF World Athletics Final. She also had her second career win at the Fifth Avenue Mile.

=== Late career ===
Douma-Hussar defeated Korene Hinds to lift the women's title at the 2008 NACAC Cross Country Championships and won at the Emerald Nuts Midnight Run, but she missed out on the Olympics as her track performances began to decline (she had season's bests of 4:09.61 min for the 1500 m and 4:36.29 min for the mile). She became pregnant in late 2008 and gave birth to her first daughter (Pippa) in June 2009. She returned to action in 2010 and began to compete in longer distance races. She won the Canadian 10K road title in October. She still had success on the indoor track in 2011 with runner-up finishes in the 1500 m and mile at the Millrose Games, Boston Indoor Games and New Balance Games.

== Personal bests ==
- 800 meters - 2:02.43 min (2004)
- 1000 meters - 2:36.26 min (2005)
- 1500 meters - 4:02.29 min (2005)
- 1500 meters indoors - 4:08.18 min (2004) NR
- Mile run - 4:26.76 min (2007)
- Mile run indoors - 4:28.43 min (2005) NR
- 3000 meters - 8:53.83 min (2005)
