= Fasil Bizuneh =

- Fasil Bizuneh

Personal information
- Born: May 5, 1980 (age 46) Germany
- Education: Arizona State University (BS, Chemical Engineering); Moreland University (MEd, Globalization)

Sport
- Sport: Track and field, Road running
- Event: Long-distance running
- College team: Arizona State Sun Devils
- Team: New Balance

Achievements and titles
- Personal bests: 1,500 m: 3:45 (2005); 5,000 m: 13:45 (2005); 10,000 m: 27:50.48 (2008); 10 Miles: 47:29 (2010); 15 km Road: 43:52 (2009); Half Marathon: 1:02:20 (2007); Marathon: 2:16:47 (2007)
Medal record
Men's athletics
Representing United States
NACAC Cross Country Championships
Gold medal – first place	2007 Salinas	Senior race
Gold medal – first place	2007 Salinas	Team
International Chiba Ekiden
Silver medal – second place	2006 Chiba	Team

Fasil Bizuneh (born May 5, 1980) is an American writer and former professional long-distance runner. He currently resides on the Big Island of Hawaiʻi.

== Early life and education ==
Bizuneh was born in Germany. He attended Arizona State University, where he competed for the Arizona State Sun Devils track and field team and earned a Bachelor of Science degree in Chemical Engineering. He later earned a Master of Education in Globalization from Moreland University in 2016. During his collegiate running career, he was a four-time NCAA Division I All-American, finishing 6th in the 10,000 metres at the 2001 NCAA Division I Outdoor Track and Field Championships.

== Writing and media ==
Bizuneh has written essays on inheritance, legacy, and discipline published across media outlets including Honolulu Civil Beat, MinnPost, Arizona Daily Sun, Tadias Magazine, and Citius Mag. His narrative audio piece The Light has been broadcast nationally via PRX Remix and Sirius XM.

== Athletic career ==
Bizuneh competed as a sponsored professional distance runner for New Balance from 2005 to 2012.

Early in his road racing career, Bizuneh won the inaugural 2003 Big Sur Half Marathon on Monterey Bay with a time of 1:06:02 and captured victory at the 2006 Dallas White Rock Half Marathon with a time of 1:02:59.

In international competition, Bizuneh represented Team USA at the 1999 IAAF World Cross Country Championships in Belfast, Northern Ireland, placing 24th in the U20 race as the top American finisher. He earned both individual and team gold medals at the 2007 NACAC Cross Country Championships in Salinas, Puerto Rico, and finished second as part of Team USA at the 2006 International Chiba Ekiden in Japan.

Nationally, Bizuneh won the USATF National Road 10-Mile Championship at the Crim Festival of Races in Flint, Michigan on August 28, 2010, posting a winning time of 47:29.

== Personal life ==
Bizuneh teaches and writes on the northern tip of Hawai‘i Island where he lives with his two children. He is also an avid spearfisherman. In 2021, he set the Hawaiʻi state spearfishing record for the Bullethead Parrotfish (Stethojulis balteata).
