= Queen's Park Savannah =

Park in Port of Spain, Trinidad and Tobago

Coordinates: 10.669296°N 61.514082°W

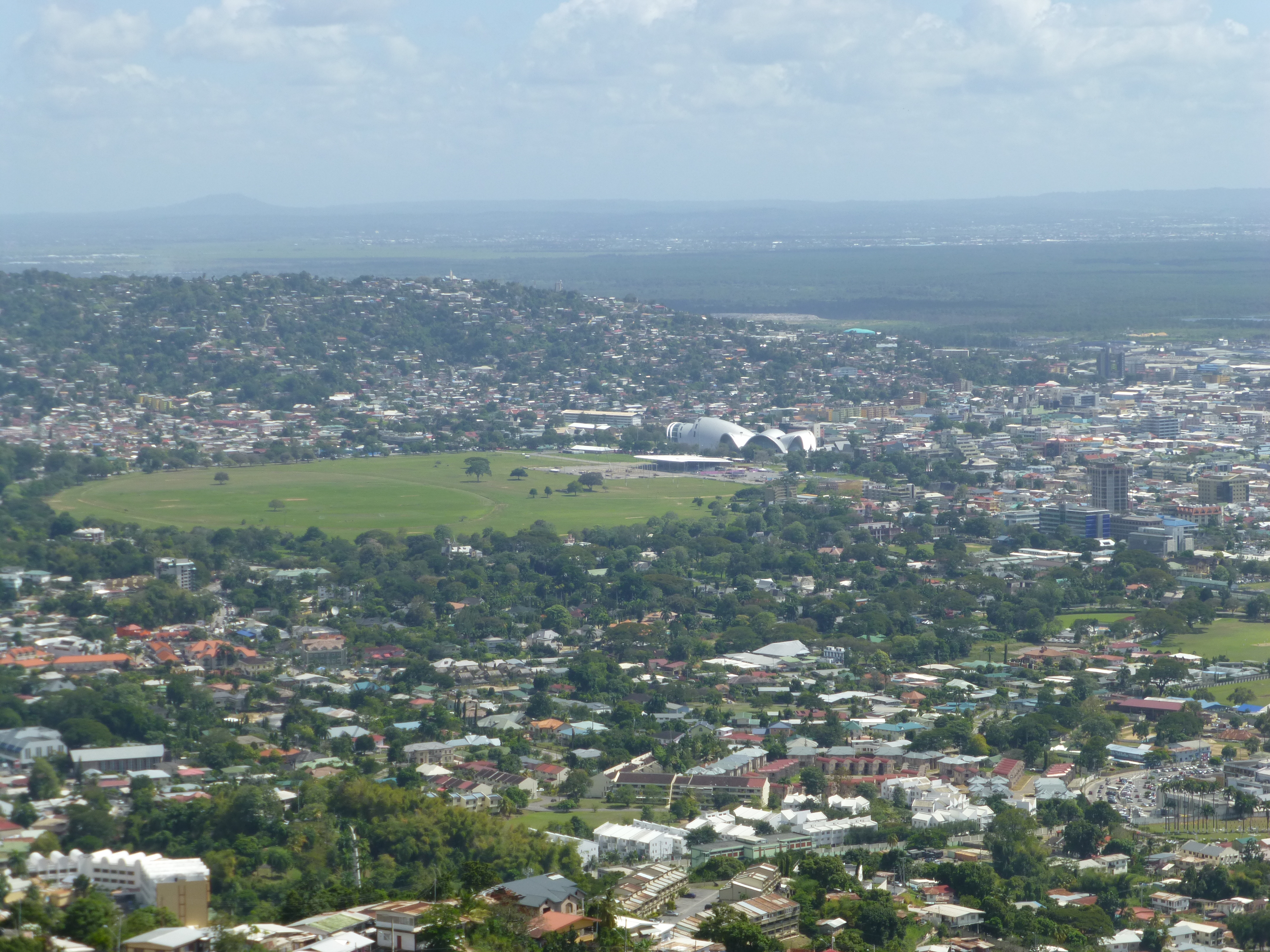
View on QPS from Fort George Hill

Queen's Park Savannah (QPS) is a park in Port of Spain, Trinidad and Tobago. Known locally as simply "the Savannah", it is Port of Spain's largest open space. It occupies about 260 acres (110 ha) of level land, and the distance around the perimeter is about 2.2 mi (3.5 km).

== History ==
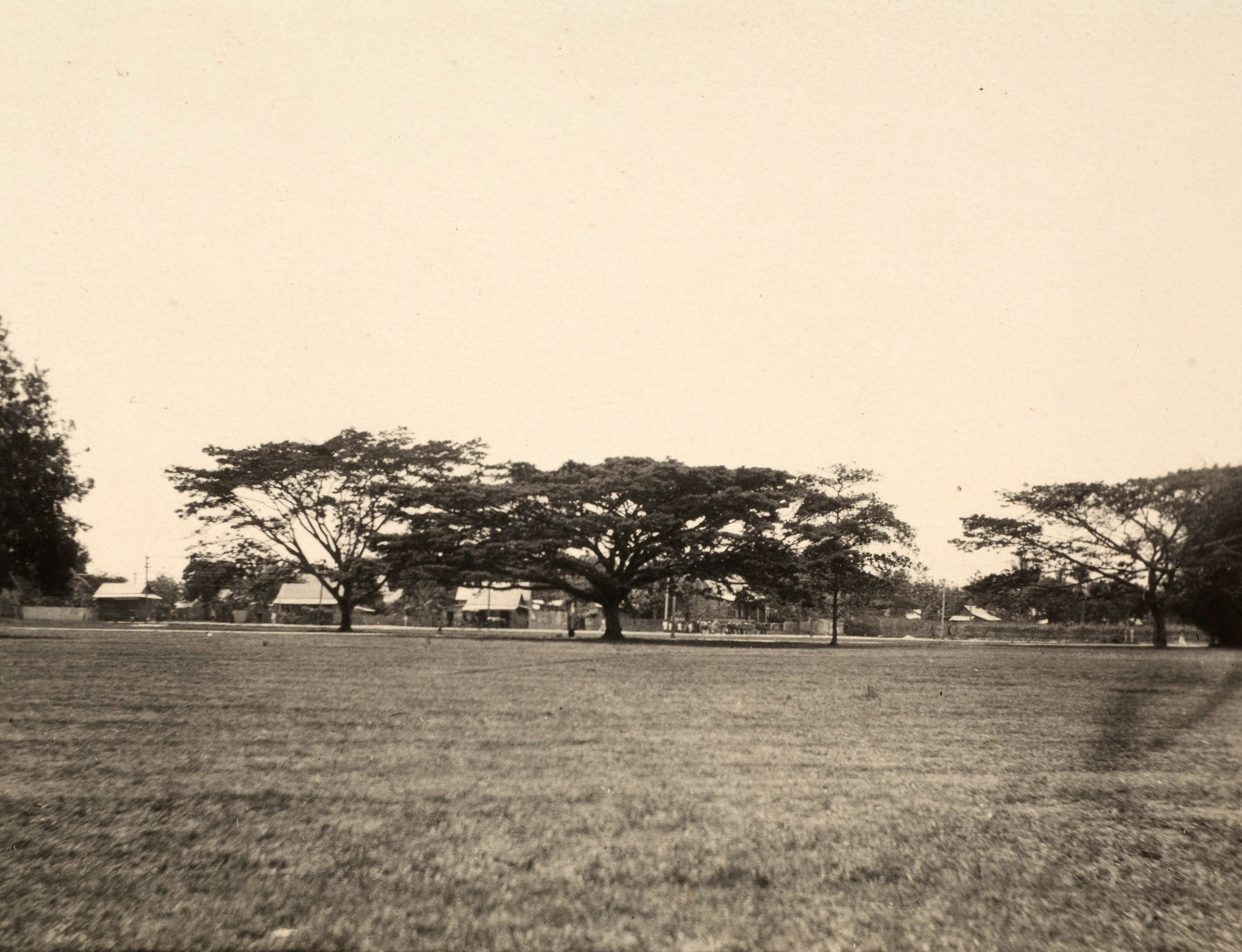
The Savannah in 1912

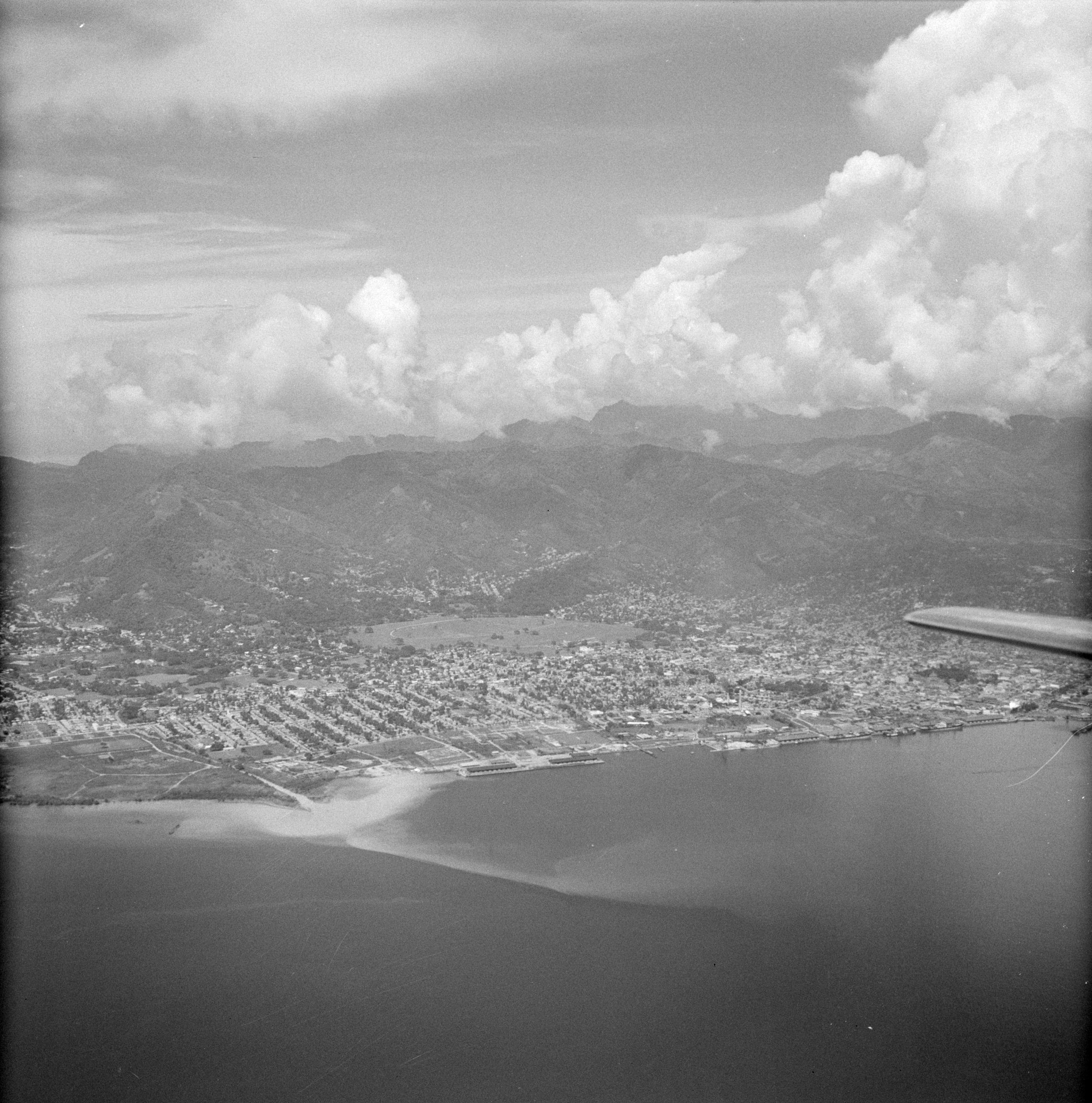
Aerial picture from 1955

Once sugarcane farm land, it was bought by the town council in 1817 from the Peschier family (except for a small parcel near its centre that served as the Peschier cemetery, which remains in private hands).

At first it was used as a vast cattle pasture in what was then the town's suburbs, but by the mid-19th century it had become established as a park. In the early 20th century, it was used as an airstrip when there were no airports built. Until the early 1990s, horse racing was held frequently at the Savannah race track, and it also contains several cricket, football and rugby pitches. Apart from a ring of trees round its perimeter, the Savannah was never really landscaped, except for the small area in its northwest corner called the Hollows, a former reservoir now drained and planted with ornamental shrubs.

== Royal Botanic Gardens and Emperor Valley Zoo ==
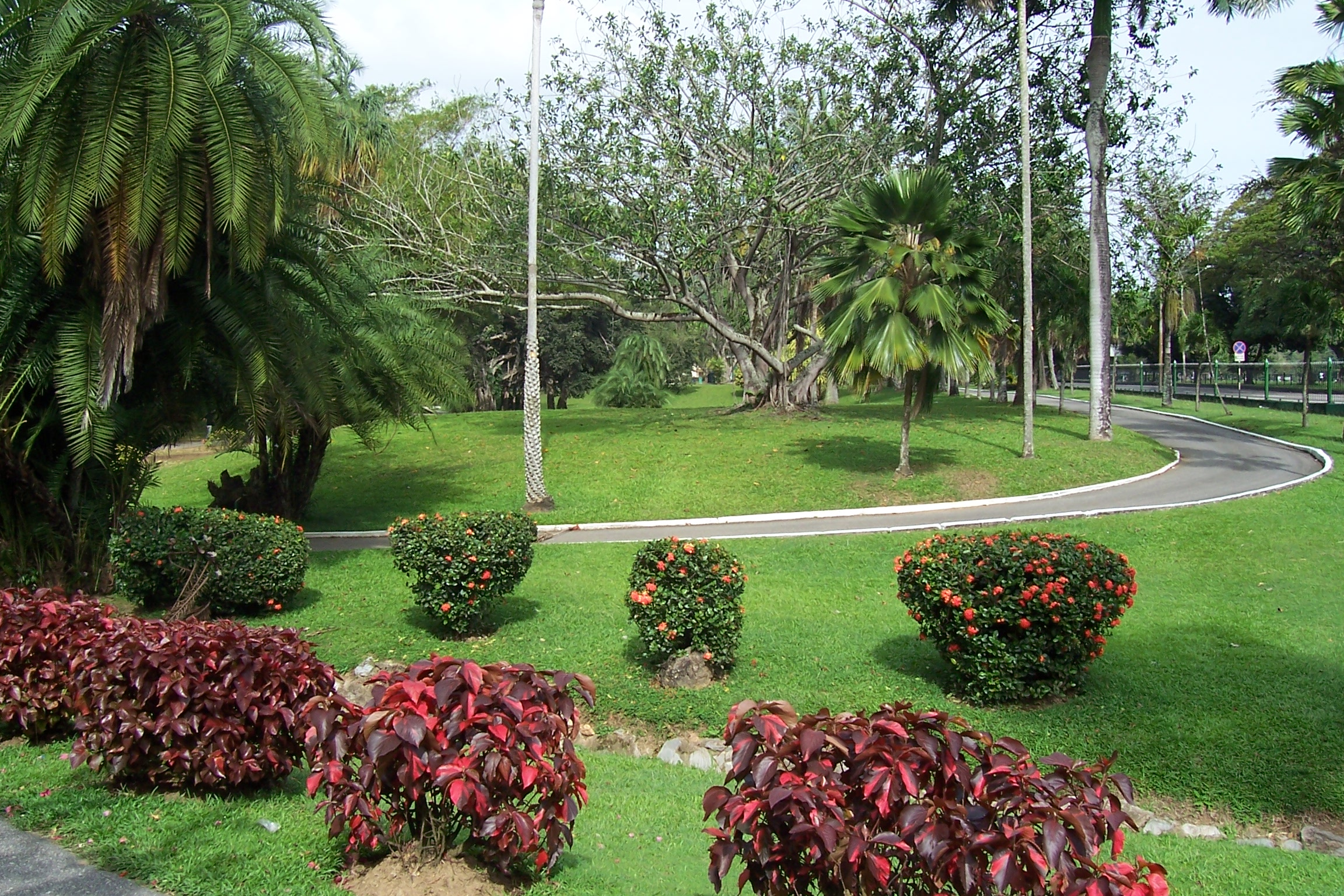
Royal Botanic Gardens

Immediately north of the Savannah—also the northern limit of the city of Port of Spain—are the Royal Botanic Gardens, the Emperor Valley Zoo, the official residences of the president and the prime minister, and Queen's Hall, the city's major performing arts venue. Lady Chancellor Road, which ascends the hills overlooking the Savannah, is one of Port of Spain's most exclusive residential areas.

== Carnival ==
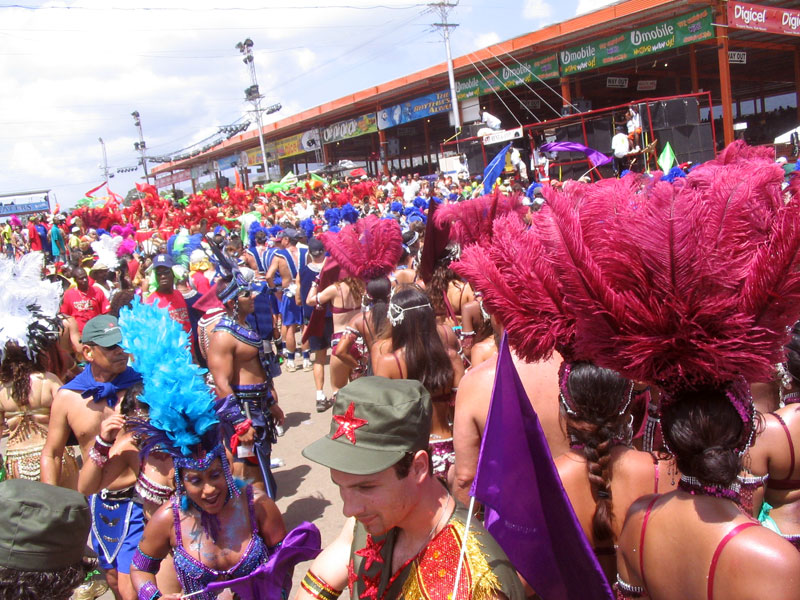
Masqueraders cross the stage at the Queen's Park Savannah during the parade in Trinidad and Tobago Carnival

On the Savannah's southern side is the Grand Stand, formerly used for viewing horse races, now used for various cultural events, most notably Carnival, when a temporary North Stand and raised stage are constructed in front of the Grand Stand, creating the "Big Yard", Carnival's central location since the early 20th century (previously, the main viewing area for Carnival was in downtown Port of Spain). From this location, the Parade of Bands is broadcast live to the nation on Carnival Monday and Tuesday; it is also the venue for the Calypso Monarch and Carnival King and Queen Competitions and the finals of the Panorama steelpan competition.

== Magnificent Seven houses ==
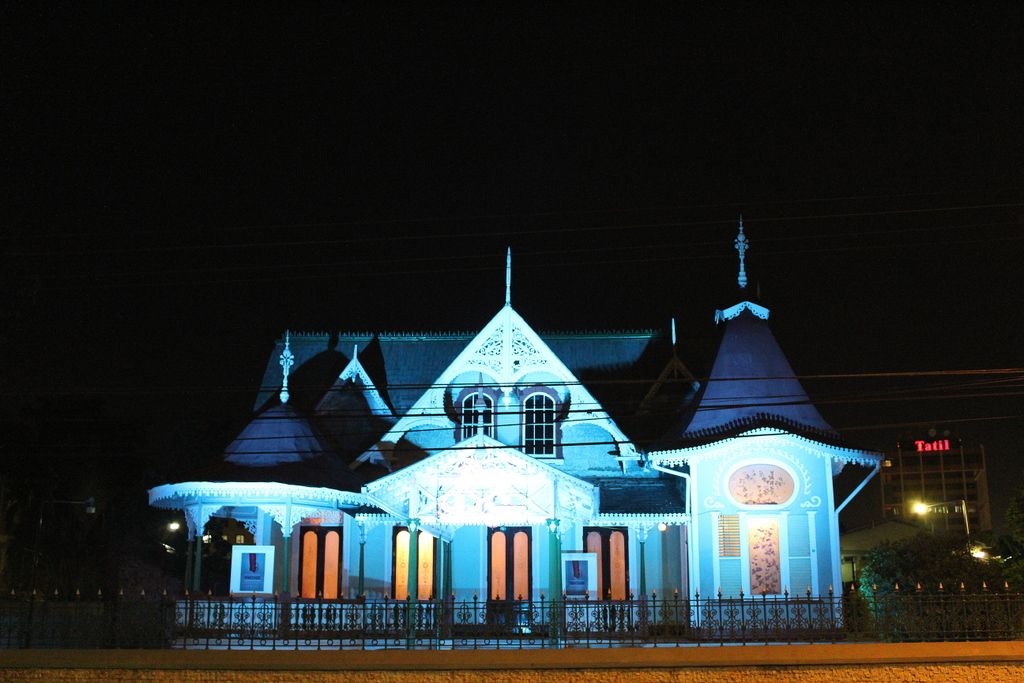
Gingerbread house around Queen's Park Savannah West at night.

The western edge of the Savannah, along Maraval Road, is the location of the Magnificent Seven houses, a group of late-Victorian buildings built in an eccentric and flamboyant variety of styles. These are Queen's Royal College; the residences of the Anglican bishop (Hayes Court) and the Roman Catholic archbishop; Whitehall, once a private residence, now the office of the prime minister; Mille Fleurs, the future home of the Law Association; Roomor, an ornate black-and-white chateau-like building that remains a private residence; and Stollmeyer's Castle, a turreted house supposedly modelled on Balmoral Castle that is now being converted into subsidiary offices for the prime minister's staff.

== Open Air Food Court ==
The Open Air Food Court is a night market at Queen's Park Savannah. It is a spot to grab local food during the warm evenings in Port of Spain, whether doubles or corn soup, shawarmas/gyros or jerk chicken, bake and shark or shaved ice. The stands start to set up in the early evening, and food is available from 18:00 at the earliest, with many of the stalls closing about 22:00.
