= Mount Irvine Bay Golf Club =

- Interactive map of Mount Irvine Bay Golf Club
- 11.18847°N 60.79369°W

Club information
- Location: Tobago, West Indies
- Established: 1968
- Owner: Mount Irvine Bay Hotel and Golf Club
- Operator: Mount Irvine Bay Hotel and Golf Club
- Tota holes: 18
- Tournaments: Shell's Wonderful World of Golf
- Designed by: John D. Harris
- Par: 72
- Length: 6793
- Course record: 65

Mount Irvine Bay Golf Club is a golf course in Trinidad and Tobago, known as one of the home courses for professional golfer Stephen Ames. The course hosted a 1970 episode of Shell's Wonderful World of Golf between Bob Murphy, Dan Sikes and Miller Barber.

Consistently rated among the top 50 courses in the Caribbean, it was voted the number 1 course by readers of Lifestyle & Travel magazine in 1994.
