= Royal Botanic Gardens, Trinidad =

Royal Botanic Gardens
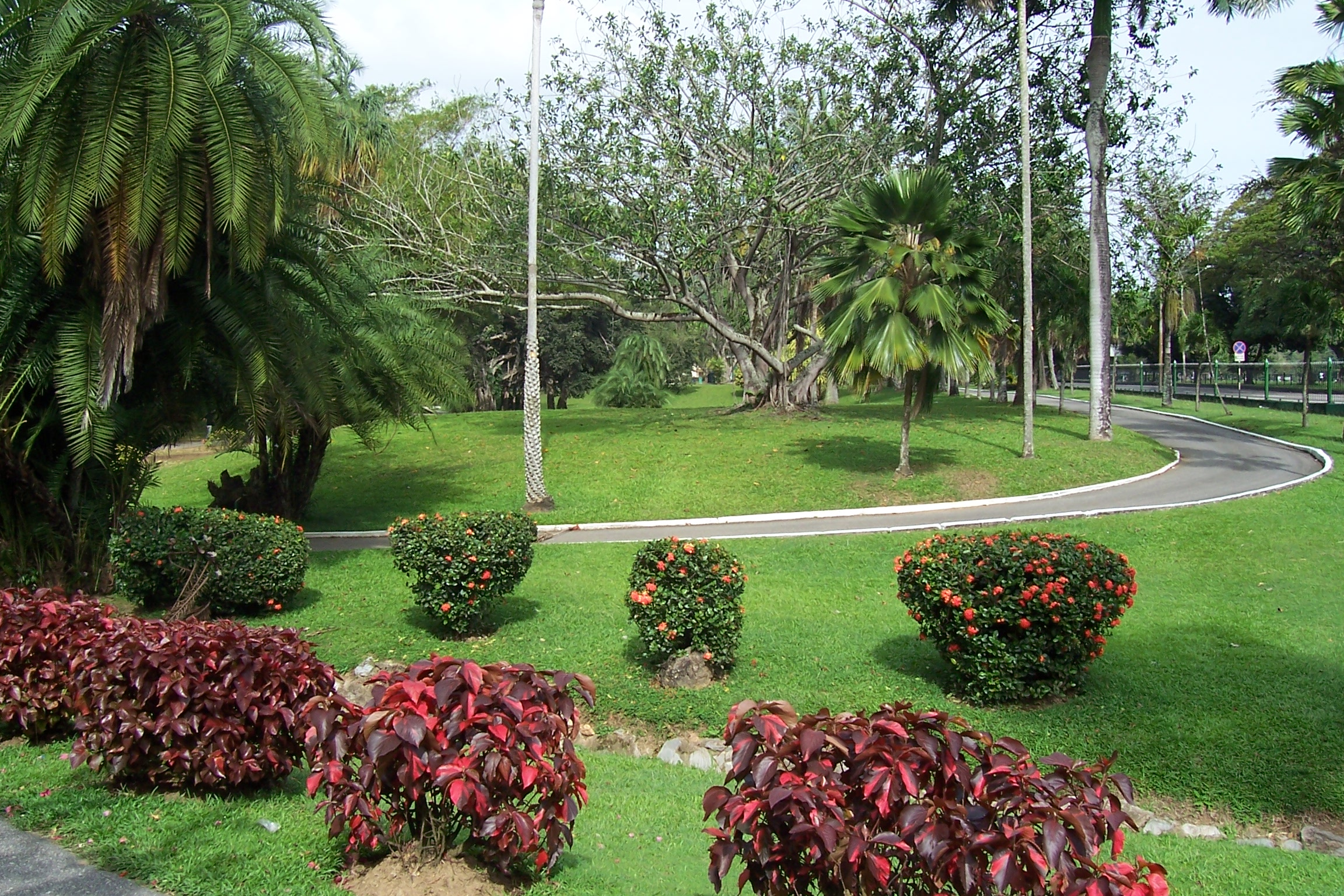
- A view of Trinidad's Botanic Gardens from the western end
- Interactive map of Royal Botanic Gardens
- Location: Queen's Park Savannah, Port of Spain, Trinidad and Tobago
- Coordinates: 10.6744°N 61.5143°W
- Area: 25 hectares (62 acres)
- Opened: 1818
- Plants: 700
- Collections: Trees from every continent

The Royal Botanic Gardens in Trinidad and Tobago is located in Port of Spain. The Gardens, which were established in 1818, are situated just north of the Queen's Park Savannah. This is one of the oldest Botanic Gardens in the world. The landscaped site occupies 61.8 acres (25 hectares) and contains some 700 trees, of which some 13% are indigenous to Trinidad and Tobago, whilst others are collected from every continent of the world .

The Gardens are open to the public every day of the year from 6 a.m. to 6 p.m.

The grounds include a small burial plot in which former Governors of Trinidad have been buried since 1819.
