= Max King (runner) =

American long-distance runner (born 1980)

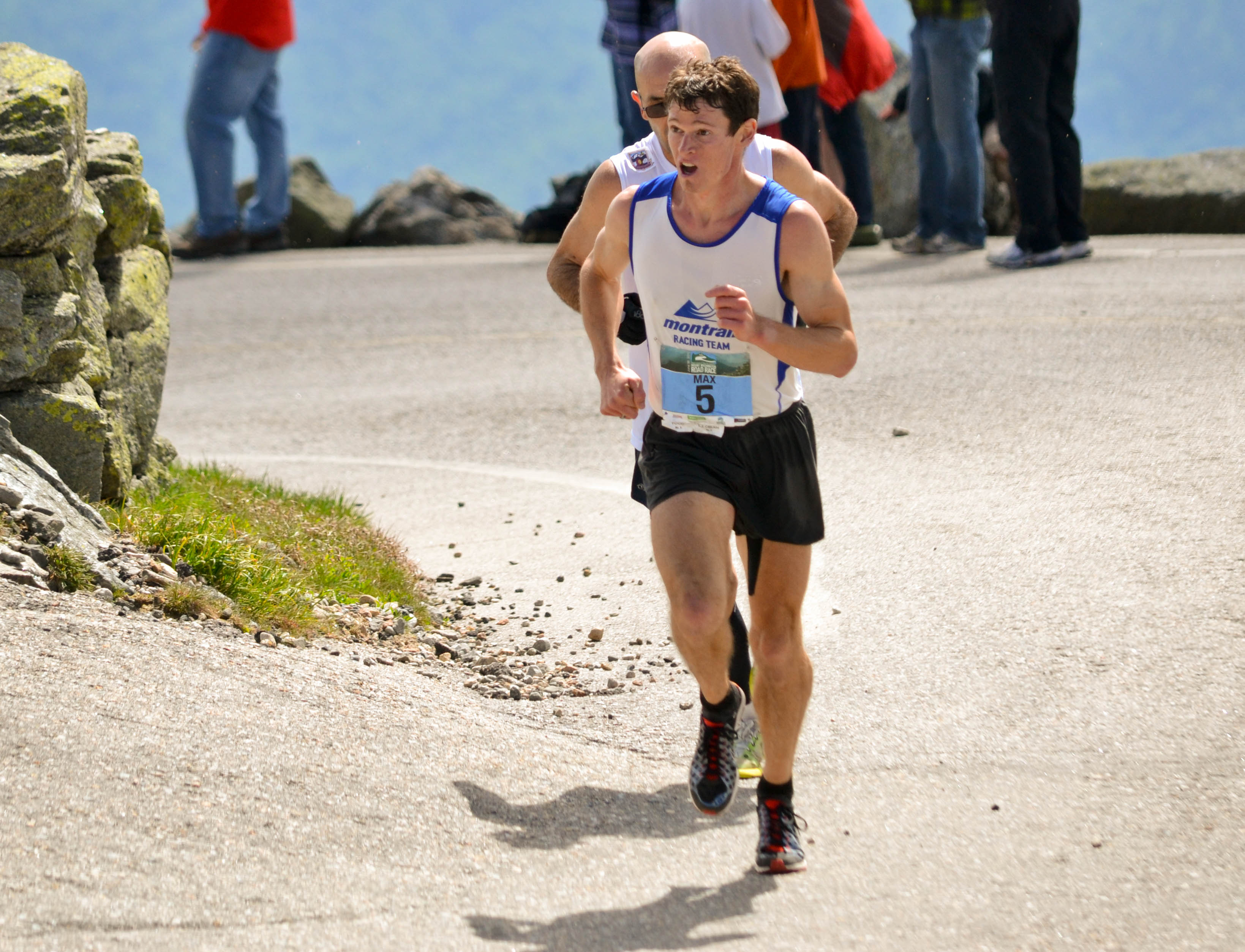

Personal information
- Full name: Maxwell King
- Nationality: American
- Born: 24 February 1980 (age 46)

Max King (born February 24, 1980) is an American ultra-marathoner. He was the winner at the 2014 IAU 100 km World Championships and the 2011 World Mountain Running Championships. King earned the bronze medal at the 2016 NACAC Cross Country Championships / Pan American Cross Country Cup.

He has also won numerous national titles at various distances ranging from half marathon to ultra marathons. In addition, he has won multiple national runner of the year awards. King has set 20 Fastest Known Time running records, including the speed record for the 44-mile Olympic National Park Grand Loop in 2020.

King graduated from Cornell University in 2002, where he was a member of the Quill and Dagger society.
