= Athletics at the 2019 Pan American Games – Women's 10,000 metres =

Women's 10,000 metres at the 2019 Pan American Games
- Venue: Athletics Stadium
- Dates: August 6
- Competitors: 13 from 9 nations
- Winning time: 31:55.17

Medalists
Gold medal	Natasha Wodak	Canada
Silver medal	Risper Biyaki	Mexico
Bronze medal	Rachel Cliff	Canada

The women's 10,000 metres competition of the athletics events at the 2019 Pan American Games will take place between the 6 August at the 2019 Pan American Games Athletics Stadium. The defending Pan American Games champion is Brenda Flores from Mexico.

== Records ==
Prior to this competition, the existing world and Pan American Games records were as follows:

World record	Almaz Ayana (ETH)	29:17.45	Rio de Janeiro, Brazil	August 12, 2016
Pan American Games record	Brenda Flores (MEX)	32:41.33	Toronto, Canada	July 23, 2015

== Schedule ==
Date	Time	Round
August 6, 2019	17:25	Final

== Results ==
All times shown are in seconds.

KEY:	q	Fastest non-qualifiers	Q	Qualified	NR	National record	PB	Personal best	SB	Seasonal best	DQ	Disqualified

=== Final ===
The results were as follows:

Rank	Name	Nationality	Time	Notes
1st place, gold medalist(s)	Natasha Wodak	Canada	31:55.17	GR
2nd place, silver medalist(s)	Risper Biyaki	Mexico	31:59.00	PB
3rd place, bronze medalist(s)	Rachel Cliff	Canada	32:13.34	
4	Elaina Tabb	United States	32:24.37	
5	Carolina Tabares	Colombia	32:25.19	
6	Sarah Pagano	United States	32:48.04	
7	Lizaida Valdivia	Peru	33:14.12	PB
8	Ursula Sanchez	Mexico	33:22.30	
9	Tatiele de Carvalho	Brazil	33:57.62	
10	Tonya Nero	Trinidad and Tobago	34:15.36	
11	Diana Landi	Ecuador	34:33.49	PB
12	Gladys Machacuay	Peru	34:48.69	
13	Dailín Belmonte	Cuba	35:01.01	SB
