= Desiree Linden =

American long-distance runner (born 1983)

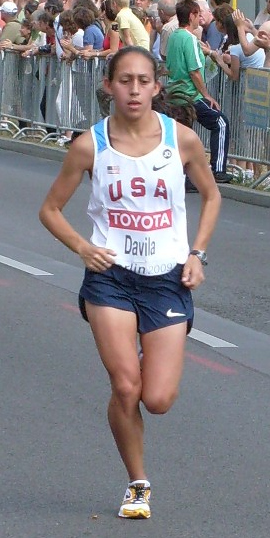
- Linden in Berlin in 2009

Personal information
- Nicknames: Desi; Des
- Nationality: American
- Born: Desiree Davila; July 26, 1983 (age 43) San Diego, California, U.S.
- Home town: Charlevoix, Michigan, U.S.
- Education: Hilltop High School 2001; Arizona State University 2005
- Occupation: long-distance runner
- Years active: 2006–present
- Height: 5 ft 1 in (1.55 m)
- Weight: 100 lb (45 kg)
- Spouse: Ryan Linden
- Other interests: collecting whiskey and tapestries

Sport
- Country: United States
- Sport: Athletics
- Events: 10,000 meters, Half marathon, Marathon
- College team: Arizona State Sun Devils
- Club: Brooks
- Coached by: Walt Drenth

Achievements and titles
- Olympic finals: 2012 Marathon, DNF; 2016 Marathon, 7th
- World finals: 2009 Marathon, 10th
- National finals: 2008 Marathon, 13th; 2012 Marathon, Silver; 2016 Marathon, Silver
- Personal bests: 5000 m: 15:08.64 (London 2011); 10,000 m: 31:37.14 (Eugene 2011); Half marathon: 1:10:34 (Naples 2011); Marathon: 2:22:38 (Boston 2011)
Medal record
Representing United States
Pan American Games
Silver medal – second place	2015 Toronto	10,000 m
World Marathon Majors
Gold medal – first place	2018 Boston	Marathon
Silver medal – second place	2010 Chicago	Marathon
Silver medal – second place	2011 Boston	Marathon

Desiree "Des" Nicole Linden (née Davila; born July 26, 1983) is an American long-distance runner, author, and podcaster. She represented the United States in the 2012 London Olympics and the 2016 Rio de Janeiro Olympics women's marathon. In 2018, she won the Boston Marathon, becoming the first American in 33 years to win the woman's category in the event. She holds the women's 50K world record of 2:59:54. The 2025 Boston Marathon was her final professional road race.

In January 2023, Linden began a podcast called "Nobody Asked Us" with fellow runner Kara Goucher. In the podcast, Linden and Goucher discuss a wide range of topics related to running and elite running performances. The first three episodes were released on January 11, and new episodes are released weekly.

== Early career ==
Desiree Davila was born in Chula Vista, California.

=== High school ===
In high school Davila ran track and cross country, and played soccer. She ran a sub-5 minute mile as a high school freshman and graduated from Hilltop High School in 2001. At the CIF California State Meet she was a finalist all four years. In both 1998 and 1999 she was 8th in the 1600. 1999 saw her also attempt to double in the 800 meters, finishing last after being depleted from the 1600. In 2000, she improved that to 5th. Her best finish was 4th in 2001 in the 3200.

=== College ===
Linden majored in psychology and religious studies at Arizona State University, and was a two time All-American in track and cross country. She finished third at the 2005 Pac-10 5,000m Collegiate Championships (16:59.93).

== Professional career ==
Linden is sponsored by Coros Global, TCS, and Brooks Running.

Career highlights:

=== 2006–2007 ===
- In the Road Running World Championships 2006 in Debrecen she finished in 43rd place.
- Her first appearance in a marathon was at the 2007 Boston Marathon, where she placed 19th in 2:44:56.
- In the 2007 IAAF World Road Running Championships in Udine in 34th.

=== 2008–2009 ===
- Linden finished second at the 2008 Houston Half Marathon and ran her personal best time of 1:12:10. This time qualified her for the 2008 U.S. Olympic Marathon Team Trials.
- At the U.S. Olympic Trials in Boston in 2008, she finished 13th in 2:37:50.
- Later at the track portion of the Olympic Trials in Eugene, she ran tenaciously with the leaders of the 10,000 meters before fading to 11th.
- At the 2008 Chicago Marathon, Linden finished 5th in 2:31:33.
- On August 23, 2009, Linden finished tenth at the IAAF World Championship in the marathon and set a personal record by 3 minutes. Her time of 2:27:53 was the second-fastest American woman.

=== 2010–2011 ===
- She finished second at the 2010 Chicago Marathon, setting a personal record by one minute. Her time of 2:26:20 was the fastest American woman.
- Linden came in third at the 2010 USA Championships 10,000m (32:22.32)
- Linden finished second at the 2011 Boston Marathon by just two seconds and set a personal record by four minutes. Her time of 2:22:38 was then the fastest time ever run by an American woman in the Boston Marathon. After her success in Boston she was invited to throw the first pitch at a Detroit Tigers game.

=== 2012–2013 ===
- She finished second in the U.S. Olympic Marathon Trials January 14, 2012, in Houston, TX with a time of 2:25:55. which qualified her to run the marathon at the 2012 London Summer Olympics on August 5, 2012, but did not finish. Her Olympic failure was attributed to a stress fracture of the femur.
- 2013 marked her return to competition, finishing second at the USATF Half Marathon Championships.
- At the 2013 Berlin Marathon, Davila finished fifth, winning her age group, in 2:29:15. For this accomplishment, she was selected the USATF Athlete of the Week.

=== 2014–2016 ===
- She finished 10th at the 2014 Boston Marathon, in 2:23:54, second fastest American woman, behind Shalane Flanagan at 2:22:02.
- She finished 5th at the 2014 TCS New York City Marathon in 2:28:11, the fastest American woman.
- She finished 4th at the 2015 Boston Marathon, in 2:25:39, the fastest American woman.
- Desiree finished 6th in the 10,000 meters in 32:53.50 at 2015 USA Outdoor Track and Field Championships on June 25
- She won a silver medal at the 2015 Pan American Games 10,000 meters. She led the majority of the race, which set up Brenda Flores to sprint past her on the final straightaway.

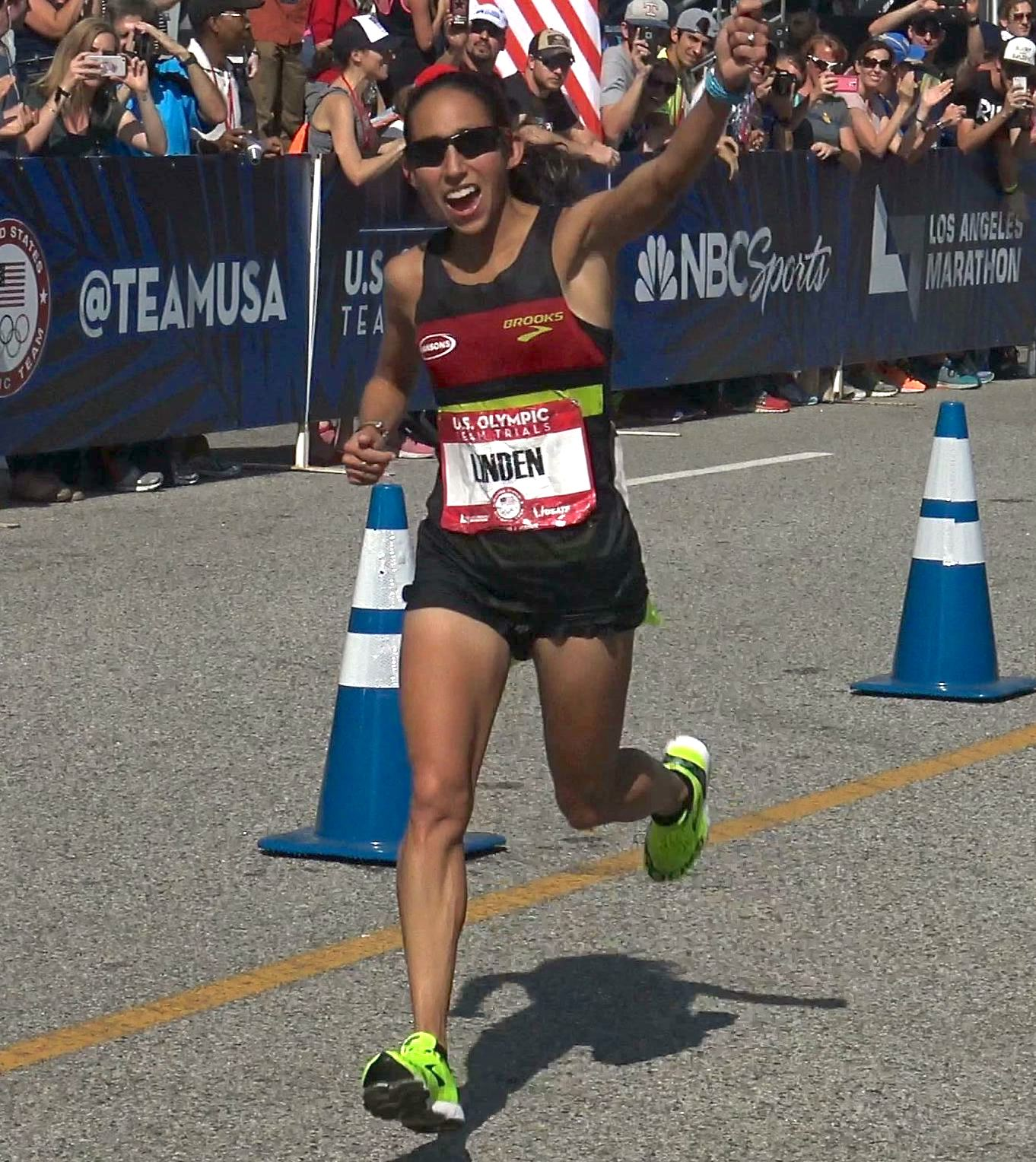
Desiree Linden finishing the 2016 U.S. Olympic Trials Marathon

- On February 13, 2016, she placed second, behind Amy Hastings, at the US Olympic Marathon Trials, finishing in 2:28:54 in Los Angeles, California.
- On April 30, 2016, she placed second, behind Tara Erdmann Welling at the USA Half Marathon Championships, finishing in 1:11:06 in Columbus, Ohio.
- August 14, 2016, Linden placed 7th at the Athletics at the 2016 Summer Olympics – Women's marathon in 2:26:08.

=== 2017–2019 ===
- On March 19, 2017, she placed 7th at the New York Half Marathon, finishing in 1:11:05.
- On April 17, 2017, she finished 4th in the 2017 Boston Marathon, finishing in 2:25:06, with the leader Edna Kiplagat winning in 2:21:52.

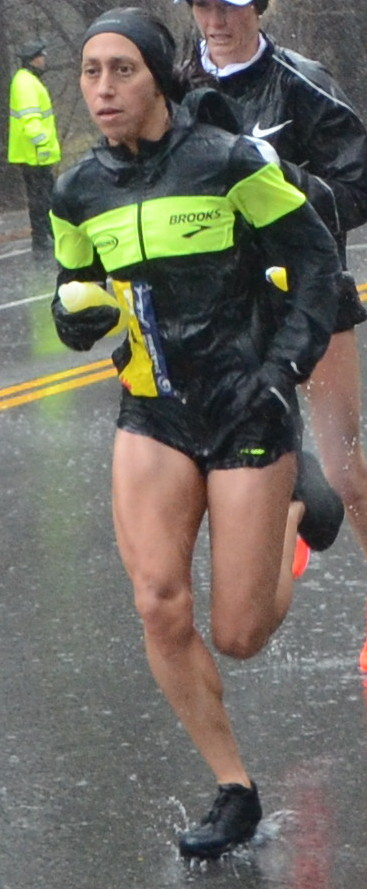
Des Linden near halfway point of Boston Marathon 2018 in which she placed 1st.

- On April 16, 2018, she placed 1st at the 2018 Boston Marathon, finishing in 2:39:55. She became the first American to win the category in 33 years.
- On November 4, 2018, she finished the 2018 New York City Marathon in 6th place with a time of 2:27:51.
- On April 15, 2019, she placed 5th at the 2019 Boston Marathon.
- On November 3, 2019, she finished the 2019 New York City Marathon in 6th place with a time of 2:26:46.

=== 2020–2025 ===
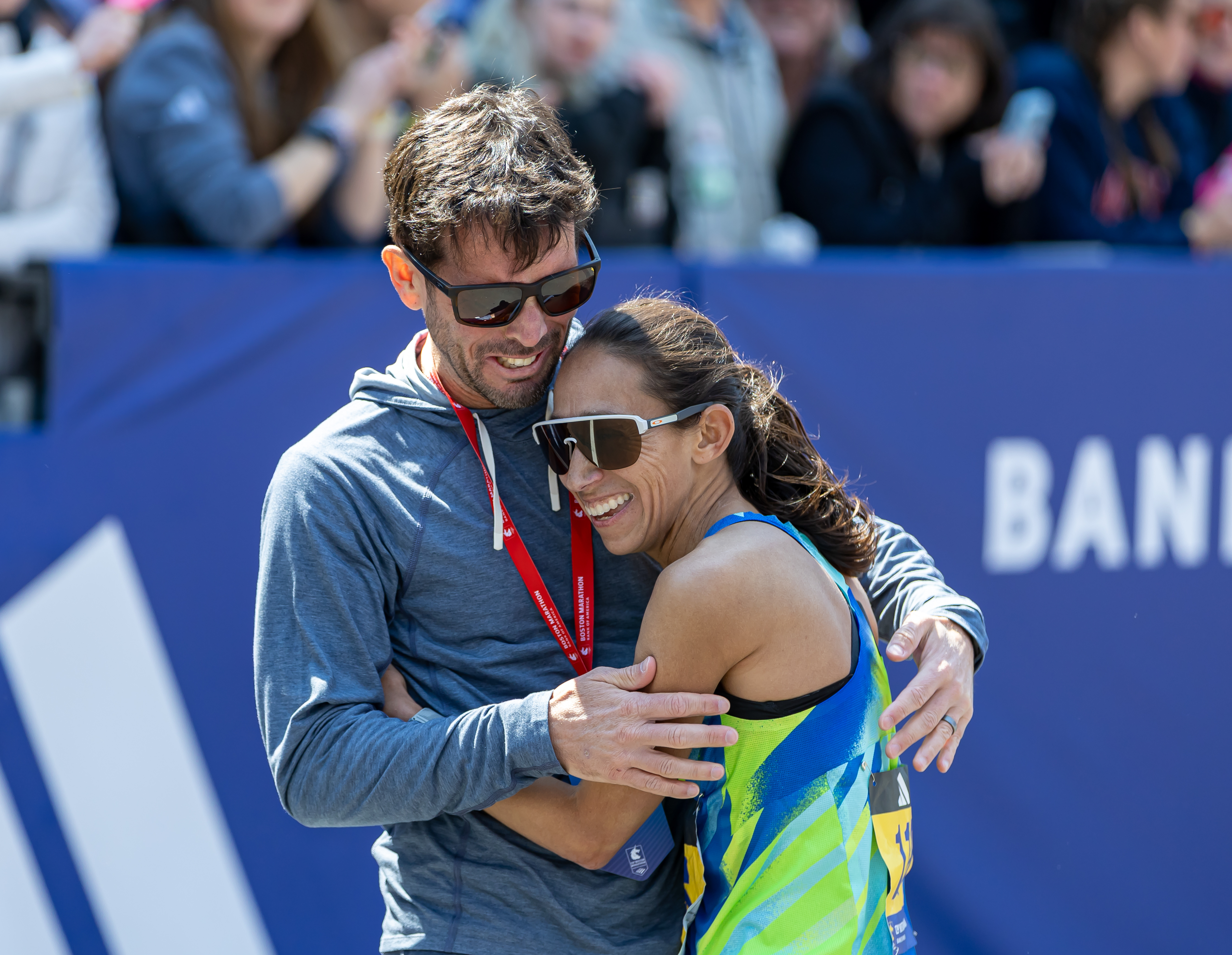
Linden after completing her final professional race in the 2025 Boston Marathon

- On February 29, 2020, she placed 4th at the U.S. Olympic Marathon Trials with a time of 2:29:03.
- On April 13, 2021, she completed a 50 km in 2:59:54, becoming the first woman ever to run 50 km under 3 hours and breaking the world record (previously 3:07:20 by Aly Dixon on September 1, 2019). This was Linden's first ultramarathon.
- On April 18, 2022, she completed the 2022 Boston Marathon in 2:28:47, taking 13th overall and 3rd among the American women.
- On April 17, 2023, she completed the 2023 Boston Marathon in 2:27:18, beating her 2022 time but taking 18th overall. She finished fourth among the top American women, behind Emma Bates, Aliphine Tuliamuk, and Sara Hall.
- On October 8, 2023, she completed the 2023 Chicago Marathon in 2:27:35, setting a new American Masters record in the marathon distance.
- In February 2024, she placed eleventh in the U.S. Olympic marathon trials.
- Linden competed in the 2024 New York City Marathon and placed eleventh in the women's field and second among masters women.
- In 2024, Linden served on the advisory board of Every Woman's Marathon.
- Linden competed in the 2025 Boston Marathon after announcing that that event would be her final professional road race.

== Personal bests ==
Surface	Event	Time	Date	Location
Outdoor track	5,000 m	15:08.64	August 6, 2011	London, England
Outdoor track	10,000 m	31:37.14	June 23, 2011	Eugene, Oregon
Indoor track	3,000 m	8:51.08	March 12, 2010	Doha, Qatar
Road	20 km	1:07.08	March 18, 2012	New York, New York
Road	Half marathon	1:10.34	January 16, 2011	Naples, Florida
Road	30 km	1:43.50	October 10, 2010	Chicago, Illinois
Road	Marathon	2:22:38	April 18, 2011	Boston, Massachusetts

== Personal life ==
Linden is an aficionado of bourbon. One of her role models is Deena Kastor.

She married marathoner Ryan Linden in 2013.
