= Hansons-Brooks Distance Project =

Olympic development program

The Hansons-Brooks Distance Project is an Olympic development program for post-collegiate distance runners. The program was founded by brothers Kevin Hanson and Keith Hanson in Rochester Hills, Michigan in 1999, and joined by Brooks Sports as a sponsor in 2003. It has produced a number of notable professional runners. The Hanson brothers also operate four stores for runners in the Metro Detroit area. The program is coached by Keith Hanson, Kevin Hanson, and Don Jackson.

== Current Athletes ==
=== Men ===
- Shuaib Aljabaly
- Hunter Christopher
- JP Flavin
- Ethan Gregg
- Ben Kendell
- Braedon Palmer
- Zach Panning
- Wil Smith
- CarLee Stimpfel
- Afewerki Zeru

=== Women ===
- Anne-Marie Blaney
- Colbi Borland
- Jessie Cardin
- Amy Davis-Green
- Sarah Disanza
- Caroline Garrett
- Eva Jess
- Melissa Johnson-White
- Dot McMahan
- Megan O'Neil
- Jaci Smith

== Notable Former Athletes ==
The project's first Olympian was Brian Sell in the marathon at the 2008 Summer Olympics.

Sage Canaday wrote a book titled Running For The Hansons about his experience with Hansons-Brooks, published in 2011.

Desiree Linden finished second in the 2012 Olympic Marathon Trials in Houston, TX. In August 2016, Linden placed 7th in the Olympic Marathon in Rio de Janeiro. On April 16, 2018, Linden was the first American woman in 33 years to win the Boston Marathon, with a time of 2:39:54.

Other notable former athletes include Natosha Rodgers, Neely Spence Gracey, Bobby Curtis, Jake Riley, Shadrack Kiptoo Biwott, Dathan Ritzenhein, and Mohamed Hrezi.
