= Chicago Shamrock Shuffle =

Road race held in Chicago, Illinois, US

- Date: Saint Patrick's Day
- Location: Chicago, Illinois, United States
- Event type: Road
- Distance: 8 km
- Primary sponsor: Bank of America
- Established: 1980; 46 years ago
- Course records: Men: 22:35; James Kariuki (1998); Women: 24:29 (2026); Emma Grace Hurley
- Website: https://www.shamrockshuffle.com/
- Participants: 32,500

The Chicago Shamrock Shuffle is an 8 kilometer road race held in Chicago which was started in 1980. The race is held during celebrations of Saint Patrick's Day in the Chicago area.

== History ==
For the first couple of decades, the number of participants and competitiveness of the field grew each year. In its inaugural year, the race attracted around 1000 participants. By 1992, the race had grown to nearly 7,500 participants. By 2007, the race had attracted over 30,000 runners. The number of participants is capped at 32,500.

In 1993, the race began offering prize money to the top finishers. They offered a purse of $2,000 the first year. In 2010, the prize purse had grown to $14,500, offering $2,500, $2000, $1500, $1000, and $500 to the first 5 male and female finishers.

In 2011 the race introduced a USATF team scoring championship. This scoring is coincident with the actual race. Scoring works similarly to cross country team scoring and is scored to 4 runners for both men's and women's teams.

From the races inauguration to 1992, there was no presenting sponsor. From 1993 to 1996, Sportmart was the main sponsor. From 1997 to 2007, LaSalle Bank was the main sponsor. Since 2008, Bank of America has been the presenting sponsor.

== Results ==
Key: Course record Virtual Race

Year	Men's winner	Time (m:s)	Women's winner	Time (m:s)
1980	Kurt Schallenberger (USA)	24:30	Peggy Schott (USA)	29:38
1981	Fernando Reyes (USA)	24:47	Kathryn Prosser (USA)	29:17
1982	Dan Skarda (USA)	24:10	Sarah Linsley (USA)	27:41
1983	Mike Axinn (USA)	24:02	Chris Reid (USA)	28:25
1984	Jim Hanson (USA)	24:55	Sarah Linsley (USA)	27:41
1985	Dan Skarda (USA)	25:13	Karen Lutzke (USA)	28:17
1986	Michael Buhmann (USA)	24:10	Rebecca Kirsininkas (USA)	27:20
1987	Scott Jenkins (USA)	24:28	Kimberly Gattone (USA)	29:23
1988	Jim Spivey (USA)	23:50	Kelly Innis (USA)	27:09
1989	Jon Thanos (USA)	24:18	Ann Schaefers (USA)	28:27
1990	Mark Plaatjes (RSA)	24:03	Jean McGould (USA)	28:37
1991	Greg Domontay (USA)	23:43	Michele Bush (USA)	27:03
1992	Michael O'Connor (USA)	24:05	Tauna Vanderbilt (USA)	28:53
1993	Scott Jenkins (USA)	24:05	Collette Murphy (USA)	27:18
1994	Rodney DeHaven (USA)	23:31	Laura Mizener (USA)	28:17
1995	Leszek Stoklosa (POL)	24:21	Debra Gormley (USA)	27:36
1996	Charles Mulinga (ZAM)	23:24	Wileen Gausman (USA)	27:43
1997	John Kariuki (KEN)	22:58	Collette Murphy (USA)	26:32
1998	James Kariuki (KEN)	22:35	Marian Sutton (ENG)	25:53
1999	Todd Williams (USA)	23:20	Collette Liss (USA)	26:45
2000	Mark Coogan (USA)	22:59	Collette Liss (USA)	25:26
2001	Shaun Creighton (AUS)	22:51	Kathy Butler (USA)	25:25
2002	Shaun Creighton (AUS)	22:57	Priscilla Hein (USA)	26:08
2003	Shaun Creighton (AUS)	23:13	Collette Liss (USA)	26:14
2004	Brian Sell (USA)	23:31	Tatyana Chulakh (RUS)	25:56
2005	Brian Sell (USA)	23:17	Deena Kastor (USA)	24:35.6
2006	Chad Johnson (USA)	23:52	Constantina Dita (ROM)	26:27
2007	Luke Watson (USA)	23:26	Tera Moody (USA)	27:09
2008	Brian Olinger (USA)	23:09	Annie Gasway (USA)	29:03
2009	Emmanuel Korir (KEN)	24:18	Deena Kastor (USA)	27:15
2010	John Cheruiyot (KEN)	22:39	Tera Moody (USA)	27:21
2011	Simon Bairu (CAN)	23:38	Amy Begley (USA)	26:50
2012	Abdelazziz Atmani (USA)	23:17	Julia Lucas (USA)	25:36
2013	Phillip Reid (USA)	23:07	Lisa Uhl (USA)	25:54
2014	Jacob Riley (USA)	23:06	Katie Kellner (USA)	27:13
2015	Stephen Sambu (KEN)	23:03	Alexi Pappas (GRE)	26:32
2016	Stephen Sambu (KEN)	22:45	Alexi Pappas (GRE)	26:17
2017	Stephen Sambu (KEN)	22:47	Kimberly Conley (USA)	25:43
2018	Stephen Sambu (KEN)	23:10	Laura Thweatt (USA)	26:02
2019	Joe Moore (USA)	23:18	Olivia Pratt (USA)	26:26
2020	cancelled due to COVID-19 pandemic			
2021	Alan Toled (USA)	23:56	Jane Bareikis (USA)	28:03
2022	Colin Mickow	23:18	Madison Offstein	27:13
2023	Colin Mickow	23:10	Hailey Bowes	27:25
2024	William Hague	23:48	Britney Romero	27:51
2025	Blake Buysse	23:18	Ashley Heidenrich	26:35
2026	Mohammed Ahmed (CAN)	22:59	Emma Grace Hurley (USA)	24:28
