= Shalane Flanagan =

American long-distance runner

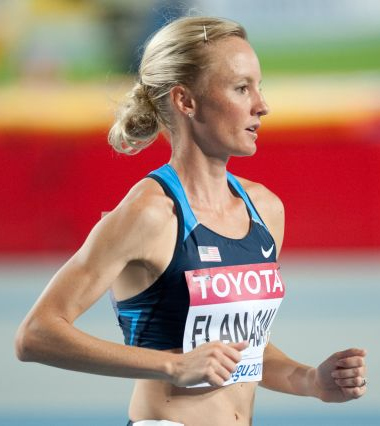
- Flanagan during the 2011 World Championships in Athletics

Personal information
- Born: July 8, 1981 (age 45) Boulder, Colorado, U.S.
- Home town: Marblehead, Massachusetts, U.S.
- Height: 5 ft 5 in (1.65 m)
- Weight: 106 lb (48 kg)
- Website: shalaneflanagan.com

Sport
- Country: United States
- College team: North Carolina Tar Heels
- Club: Bowerman Track Club
- Turned pro: Jun. 2004
- Coached by: Jerry Schumacher
- Retired: Oct. 2019
- Now coaching: Bowerman Track Club

Achievements and titles
- Olympic finals: 2004; 5000 m, 22nd (h); 2008; 10,000 m, Silver; 5000 m, 9th 2012; Marathon, 10th 2016; Marathon, 6th
- World finals: 2005; 5000 m, 16th (h); 2007; 5000 m, 8th 2009; 10,000 m, 14th 2011; 10,000 m, 7th 2013; 10,000 m, 8th 2015; 10,000 m, 6th
- Personal bests: Outdoor; 1500 m: 4:05.86 (Eugene 2007); 5000 m: 14:44.80 (Walnut 2007); 10,000 m: 30:22.22 (Beijing 2008); Indoor; 3000 m: 8:33.25i (Boston 2007); 5000 m: 14:47.62i (Boston 2009); Road; 10 km: 30:52 AR (Boston 2016); 15 km: 47:00 AR (Jacksonville 2014); Half marathon: 67:51 (San Diego 2016); Marathon: 2:21:14 (Berlin 2014)
Medal record
Women's athletics
Representing the United States
Olympic Games
Silver medal – second place	2008 Beijing	10,000 m
World Cross Country Championships
Bronze medal – third place	2011 Punta Umbria	Individual
Bronze medal – third place	2011 Punta Umbria	Team
Bronze medal – third place	2010 Bydgoszcz	Team
World Marathon Majors
Gold medal – first place	2017 New York	Marathon
Silver medal – second place	2010 New York	Marathon
Bronze medal – third place	2014 Berlin	Marathon
Bronze medal – third place	2018 New York	Marathon

Shalane Grace Flanagan (born July 8, 1981) is an American long-distance runner, coach, Olympic medalist and New York City Marathon champion. She was the first American woman to win the New York City Marathon since 1977. She holds the NACAC area records in both the 10k and 15k road races.

She won the silver medal at the 2008 Olympics in the 10,000 m (upgraded from bronze following original silver medalist's disqualification for doping) and the bronze medal at the 2011 IAAF World Cross Country Championships. She won the Women's 2017 New York City Marathon, the first American woman to do so since Miki Gorman in 1977.

== Personal life ==
Flanagan grew up in Marblehead, Massachusetts. She attended Marblehead High School, where she excelled in cross country and track. She also participated in soccer and swimming, and was an artist and painter in the art major program.

Flanagan is married to Steven Ashley Edwards, a former track and field star at the University of North Carolina. Together they are foster parents to Breauna and Keauna. While training for the Rio Olympics, one of her teammates from Bowerman Track Club Team emailed asking to find a foster home during their senior year of high school. Flanagan and her husband immediately welcomed Breuna and Keauna into their home.

Flanagan's parents are both accomplished runners. Her mother, Cheryl Treworgy, is a former marathon world record holder (as Cheryl Bridges – 1971) and a five-time U.S. World Cross Country Championship participant. Her father, Steve Flanagan, was also a U.S. World Cross Country Champion participant and marathon runner (PR 2:18). He raised Shalane and her sister Maggie in Marblehead with his second wife Monica.

In the fall of 2009, Flanagan volunteered as an assistant coach for the cross country team at her alma mater, the University of North Carolina. In the fall of 2013, Flanagan volunteered as an assistant coach for the women cross country team at Portland State University.

On August 6, 2016, Flanagan and longtime college friend Elyse Kopecky published their first cookbook Run Fast.Eat Slow. Flanagan and Kopecky met in 2000 as teammates of the cross country team while attending the University of North Carolina. After they graduated from college, they both moved to Portland, Oregon, where Flanagan went to run for Nike and Kopecky went to work in marketing for Nike. Kopecky left her marketing career to pursue culinary nutrition school in New York City. In 2013, Flanagan and Kopecky reunited in Portland where they came up with Run Fast Eat slow to prove that food could be both nourishing and delicious. Their book went on to become a New York Times Best Seller. They toured together in Oregon, San Francisco and New York City, where their events included running, inspirational talks and a chance to meet and get to know the authors better. Due to Flanagan's New York City Marathon Training and the birth of Kopecky's baby, they had to limit the number of stops on their book tour. After doing their book tour they had a better understanding of the impact their Run Fast.Eat Slow book had on the running community. The fan feedback was that they wanted Flanagan and Kopecky to write a second cookbook which would be best suited for people with busy lifestyles. Flanagan and Kopecky went on to write their second cook book Run Fast, Cook Fast, Eat Slow which focused on less time-consuming recipes whilst not compromising nourishment or flavour. Their second cook book Run Fast, Cook Fast, Eat slow was published August 18, 2018.

On April 29, 2020, Flanagan announced she and Edwards had adopted a baby boy, Jack Dean Edwards. On January 24, 2023, Flanagan announced on Instagram that she and her husband adopted a baby girl, Grace Morgan Edwards.

== Track and field career ==
=== High school ===
As a student at Marblehead High School in Massachusetts, Flanagan's accomplishments included three-time All-State cross country performances, a first-place All-State outdoor track finish in the mile in 4:52.38 and the two-mile in 10:24.21 (state meet record still stands as of 2017); her 4:46.91 mile won the National Scholastic Indoor Championships.

=== College ===
Flanagan attended the University of North Carolina-Chapel Hill, where she won national cross country titles in 2002 and 2003—becoming the first individual champion in the sport in Tar Heel history—and numerous track accolades, with best times of 4:11.24 in 1500 m (7th in the U.S. at any level in 2003), 9:00.22 in the 3000 m and 15:20.54 in the 5000 m. She won the Honda Sports Award as the best female collegiate cross country runner in the nation in both 2003 and 2004.

=== Professional career ===
==== Early professional career (2004–2007) ====
Early in her professional career, Flanagan was very successful. Since advancing to the professional level in 2004, by 2007, Flanagan lowered her 3000 m time to 8:33.25 and her 5000 m time to 14:44.80, the latter an American record at the time; she made a slight improvement to her 1500 m time of 4:05.86. She became a two-time outdoor track national champion in the women's 5000 meters and an indoor track national champion in the 3000 m. She won the short course competition at the USA Cross Country Championships in 2004 and 2005. Flanagan has been a Nike-sponsored athlete since graduating from the University of North Carolina at Chapel hill in 2004.

==== 2008 ====
Flanagan became the long course national cross country champion for the first time in February 2008. She ran the 10,000 for the first time at the 2008 Stanford Payton Jordan invite meeting, in a time of 30:34.49 to beat Deena Kastor's American record of 30:50.32. Flanagan credited her American record to the help of New Zealand's Kim Smith. Flanagan and Smith traded the lead position during the race, and Smith finished in 30:35.54.

At the Summer Olympic Trials held in Eugene, Flanagan competed in both the 5000 and 10,000 m. She won the 10,000 m final in a time of 31:34.81. This guaranteed her a spot on Team USA for Beijing. Flanagan also finished third in the 5000 m final with a time of 15:02.81. On August 16, Flanagan finished third in the Olympic 10,000 m finals in Beijing, capturing the bronze medal (later upgraded to silver). It was later upgraded to silver after Turkish runner Elvan Abeylegesse tested positive for a banned substance. Flanagan also set a then American record in 30:22.22, shattering her own record set earlier in the year. She is only the second American woman to receive an Olympic medal in the 10,000 m.

==== 2009 ====
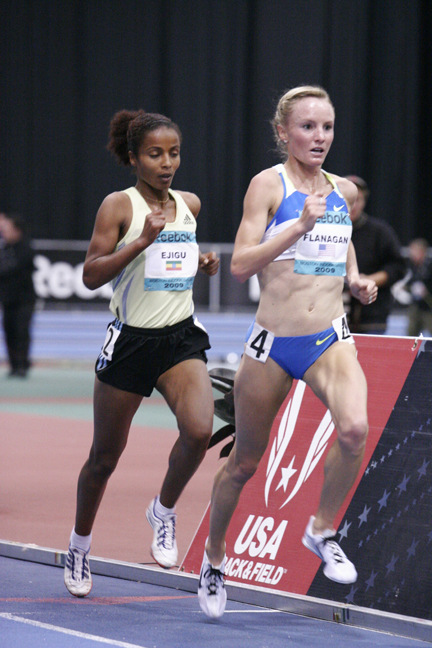
Flanagan (right) competing in the 2009 Boston Games

In 2009, Flanagan split with coach John Cook and moved to Portland, Oregon, to begin working with new coach Jerry Schumacher. She finished second to Amy Yoder Begley in the 10,000 m at the 2009 USA Track & Field Championships. At the World Championships in Berlin, Flanagan finished in 14th place in the 10,000 m with a time of 31:32.19.

==== 2010 ====
Flanagan won her first half marathon in Houston at the USA Half Marathon Championships on January 17. She set the course record in a time of 1:09:45. She added a second national championship with a victory at the USA Cross Country Championships. At the World Cross Country Championships, Flanagan finished the individual race in 12th place with a time of 25:20. She was a member of the Team USA squad that earned a bronze medal.

In June 2010, it was announced that Flanagan would make her marathon debut in the New York event in November 2010. Her preparations boded well for the event as her mark of 1:08:36 at the Philadelphia Half Marathon was just two seconds off Deena Kastor's American record at the event. Flanagan's time in Philadelphia brought her fourth place some 45 seconds behind winner Meseret Defar. In her marathon debut, Flanagan finished in second place in a time of 2:28:40. It was the best finish for an American woman in 20 years at the New York City Marathon. Flanagan captured the U.S. Marathon championship in the race. She took her fifth title at the National Cross Country Championships and asserted herself as the clear number one in the discipline, winning by a margin of 41 seconds.

==== 2011 ====
At the World Cross Country Championships on March 20, 2011, Flanagan improved on her 12th place from the year before to place third, with a time of 25:10. She led the Team USA squad to a bronze medal. Flanagan was the first non-African born medalist in the event since 2004. She competed in the June 2011 USA Championships in the 10,000 m and won with a time of 30:59.57, qualifying her for the 10,000 m at the World Championships.

On August 27, 2011, Flanagan finished seventh at the World Championships 10,000 m with a time of 31:25.57 minutes (the first non-East African born athlete to finish).

Flanagan said in June 2011 that she was leaning towards running the marathon at the 2012 London Olympics. With this in mind, she ran at the first Miami Half Marathon in December and won in a Florida state record time of 1:09:58 hours.

==== 2012 ====
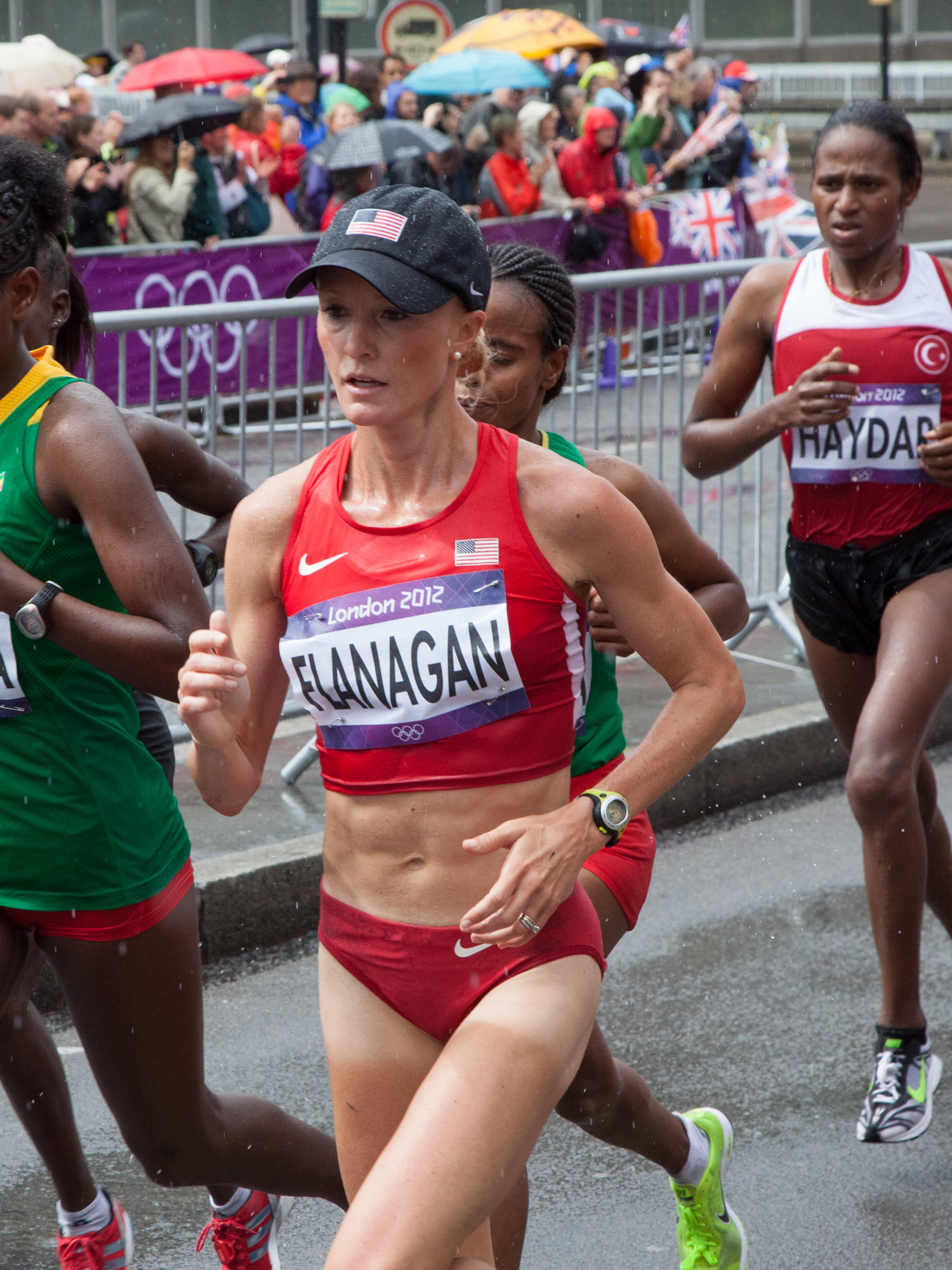
Flanagan running in the 2012 Summer Olympics

On January 14, 2012, Flanagan won the U.S. Olympic Trials Marathon in Houston, setting the event record at 2:25:38. She moved on to represent Team USA at the Olympic women's marathon in London, finishing 10th with a time of 2:25:51. She defeated a high class field at the Lisbon Half Marathon in March, recording a time of 1:08:52. She came in 25th at the 2012 IAAF World Half Marathon Championships.

==== 2013 ====
On February 2, 2013, in St. Louis, she won the 8k national cross country title in 25:49.0, just ahead of Kim Conley and Deena Kastor. Then on February 24, 2013, Flanagan set a half marathon best of 1:08:31 as runner-up to Meseret Defar at the Rock 'n' Roll Mardi Gras Marathon in New Orleans.

Flanagan qualified for the 2013 USA Outdoor Track and Field Championships with the top American time of the year at the 2013 Stanford University Invitational 10 km, where she ran 31:04 without competition for the 2nd half of the race. In June 2013, Flanagan won the 10,000 meters to claim her fourth USA outdoor track title. On August 11, 2013, Flanagan finished 8th at the IAAF world championship.

==== 2014 ====
On March 15, 2014, in Jacksonville, Florida, Flanagan won the USA 15K Championships (Gate River Run), setting a new women's American Record of 47:00 to take down Deena Kastor's previous record of 47:15 that was set in 2003.

On April 21, 2014, Flanagan led the 2014 Boston Marathon female competitors through 19 miles, ultimately finishing seventh (later upgraded to sixth) in a personal record of 2:22:02, making her the third fastest female American marathoner ever, after Kastor and 1984 Olympic champion Joan Benoit Samuelson.

On September 28, 2014, Flanagan placed third in the Berlin Marathon, with a personal best of 2:21:14. It was the second fastest time ever by an American woman at the time, 7 seconds ahead of Joan Benoit's 1985 Chicago Marathon in 2:21:21 and 98 seconds behind Deena Kastor's 2006 London Marathon in 2:19:36. Her Berlin run now ranks third on the US all-time list after Jordan Hasay's 2:20:57 at the 2017 Chicago Marathon.

==== 2015 ====
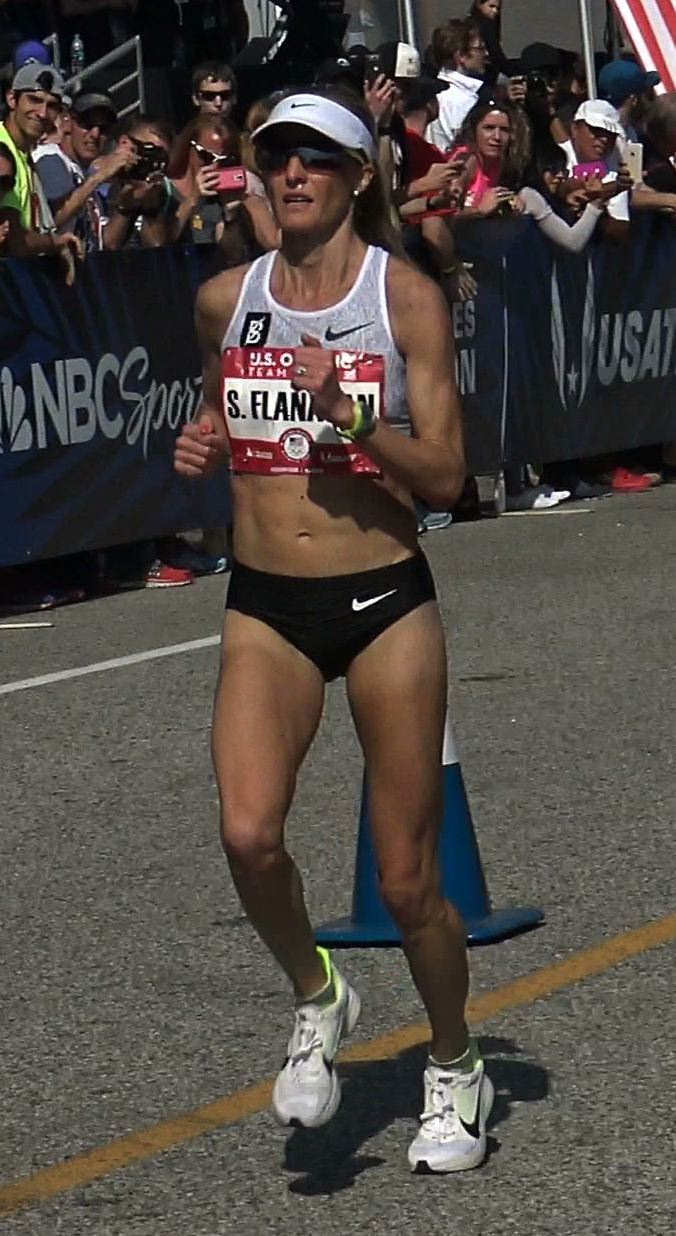
Shalane Flanagan finishing the 2016 U.S. Olympic Trials Marathon

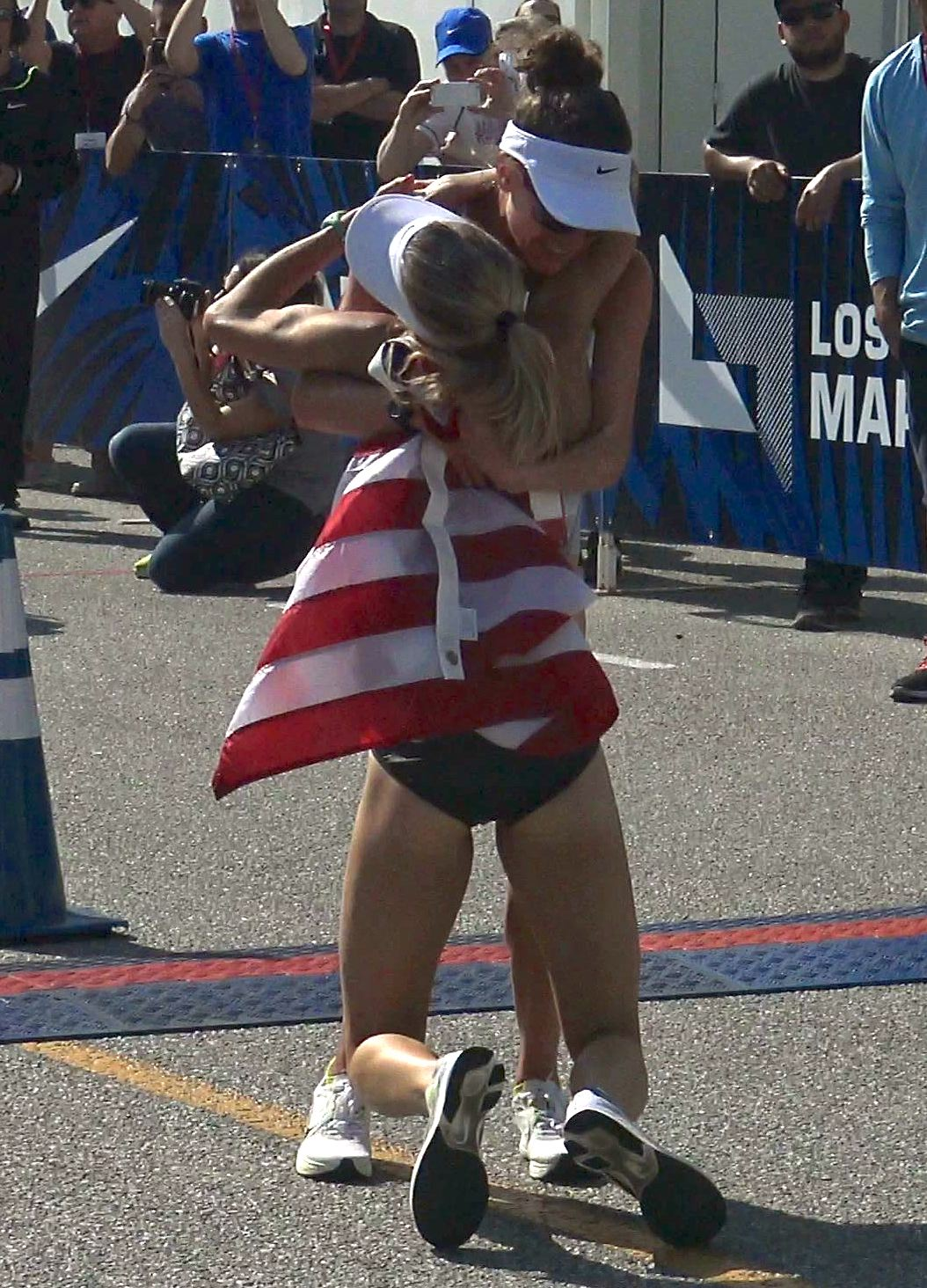
Shalane Flanagan collapses into Amy Cragg's arms while celebrating after the 2016 U.S. Olympic Trials Marathon

Flanagan ran a time qualifier for the 2015 World Championships in Athletics and USA Outdoor Track and Field Championships with the top American time of the year at the 2015 Stanford Invitational 10 km, where she ran 31:08, pacing race winner Gelete Burka in her 10 km debut. On April 20, 2015, Flanagan placed ninth in the Boston Marathon, with a season best of 2:27:47.

Flanagan finished 2nd to Molly Huddle in the 10,000 meters in 31:42.29 at the 2015 USA Outdoor Track and Field Championships on June 25. On August 24, Flanagan placed 6th in 31:46.23 in China in the 10,000 meters. On September 6, Flanagan set the American record and placed 2nd in the road Rabobank Tilburg Ladies Run 10 km in Netherlands in 31:03, one place ahead of Betsy Saina. Flanagan beat the national records of Lynn Jennings and Molly Huddle.

==== 2016 ====
On February 13, 2016, Flanagan placed third, behind Amy Hastings (Cragg) and Desiree Linden, at the U.S. Olympic Marathon Trials, finishing in 2:29:19 on a warm day in Los Angeles. On June 5, 2016, Flanagan placed first, setting a new PR in the half marathon, at the Suja Rock'n'Roll San Diego Marathon and half Marathon, with a time of 1:07:51. Molly Huddle ran a 1:07:41 in New York City in March, while the American record is 1:07:34, set by Deena Kastor in Berlin in 2006.

On June 26, 2016, Flanagan set an American record and won the road Boston Athletic Association 10K in Boston in 30:52. She lowered her national record by 11 seconds and beat the previous B.A.A. 10K event record by 12 seconds (31:04, held by Mamitu Daska since 2014). On August 14, 2016, Flanagan placed 6th at the 2016 Summer Olympics women's marathon in 2:25:26.

On December 12, 2016, Flanagan was upgraded from seventh to sixth in the 2014 Boston Marathon results after winner Rita Jeptoo was disqualified for doping offenses.

==== 2017 ====
In February 2017, Flanagan announced that she had suffered a fracture in her lower back and would be withdrawing from the Boston Marathon.

In March 2017, her 2008 Olympic bronze medal in the 10,000 meters was upgraded to silver after runner up Elvan Abeylegesse had her silver medal stripped due to a positive result for banned substances found in a retroactive test.

New York City Marathon

On November 5, 2017, Flanagan won the Women's New York City Marathon in 2:26:53. With about 3 miles to go, she pulled ahead of 3-time defending champion and women's-only marathon world record holder Mary Keitany of Kenya and finished ahead of her by 1:01. It was Flanagan's first win in a major marathon and the first win by an American woman at the NYC Marathon in 40 years since Miki Gorman won in 1977. Beforehand, Flanagan hinted a possible retirement with a win in NYC. In this marathon, she finished just 5 minutes 39 seconds behind her personal record.

The marathon started out slow and then proceeded with increases in intensity throughout. The first 5 km averaged 3:51/km. The pace then proceeded to steadily average about 3:33/km for the next 20 km. After the 25 km mark, the pace averaged 3:23/km for about 10 km; after the 32 km mark, competitor Daska made a move to assure the pace was at least maintained. At about the 34 km mark is where Shalane made a move, where her significant change and maintained intensity in pace left her competitors Keitany and Daska behind just after the 37 km mark. Her average pace from the 35 km to finish (over which the course averages a slight uphill) was 3:11.4/km, which was faster than the women's-only marathon world record pace of 3:14.8/km (2:17:01).

Coming into the marathon, Mary Keitany was the favorite having won the NYC Marathon three times in the past averaging 2:24 to 2:25, and having a personal record setting 2017 year in the 10k road, half marathon, and marathon (30:41+, 1:05:13, and 2:17:01 respectively) leading up to the NYC Marathon. Although the average pace from the 2:26:53 Shalane ran was slower than NYC Marathon winners in the prior years since 2011, the overall difficulty of the course (as can be inferred by the list of winning times) along with Shalane's sustained surge in pace during the last 5-7k appeared to be one of the main reasons she won the race.

==== 2018 ====
Shalane Flanagan went to defend her title and finished third in the 2018 New York City Marathon, finishing in 2:26:22 behind winner Mary Keitany in 2:22:38 and close behind Vivian Cheruiyot who finished in 2:26:02 and just 22 seconds ahead of Molly Huddle in fourth. Flanagan sat in fifth at the halfway point but was able to maintain her pace while those ahead of her were slowing down trying to keep up with Mary Keitany. Flanagan was able to secure herself in a podium position during the race after passing two women ahead of her.

==== 2019 ====
Shalane Flanagan announced her retirement from professional running on October 21, 2019, via Instagram. Flanagan, in her retirement statement, said she will be one of the head coaches for the Bowerman Track Club.

==== 2021 ====
Because the World Marathon Majors had all been rescheduled for the Fall in 2021, Flanagan registered for all 6, attempting to run all 6 Abbot World Marathon Majors, each in under 3 hours, in 6 weeks. Because Tokyo was canceled, she substituted her own marathon run in Oregon, and still completed her goal of "6 in 6", albeit with only 5 of them being majors. On September 26, she finished the 2021 Berlin Marathon in 2:38:32 (17th in the women's division); On October 3 she finished the 2021 London Marathon in 2:35:04 (1st woman from the "mass start", 30 minutes after the elite women's start, to finish); On October 10, she completed the 2021 Chicago Marathon in 2:46:39 (25th in women's division); On October 11, she finished the 2021 Boston Marathon in 2:40:34 (33rd in women's division); On October 18, in place of the canceled Tokyo Marathon, she ran in her own marathon in Oregon in 2:35:14; On November 7 she finished the 2021 New York City Marathon in 2:33:32 (12th in women's division)

==== 2022 ====
Flanagan was named as the University of Oregon assistant long-distance coach in 2022.

== Personal bests ==
Distance	Performance	Location	Date	Notes
1500 m	4:05.86	Eugene, Oregon	June 10, 2007	
3000 m	8:33.25	Boston, Massachusetts	January 27, 2007	National indoor record until 2020
5000 m	14:44.80	Walnut, California	April 13, 2007	National record until 2010
10,000 m	30:22.22	Beijing, China	August 15, 2008	National record until 2016
10 km (road)	30:52	Boston, USA	June 26, 2016	National record
15,000 m	47:00	Jacksonville, Florida	March 15, 2014	National record
Half marathon	1:07:51	San Diego, California	June 5, 2016	
Marathon	2:21:14	Berlin, Germany	September 28, 2014	

== Competition record ==
=== USA National Championships ===
==== Road ====
Year	Competition	Venue	Position	Event	Result
2007	USA 5 km Championships	Providence, Rhode Island	1st	5 km	15:25
2008	USA 5 km Championships	Providence, Rhode Island	1st	5 km	15:29
2010	USA Half Marathon Championships	Houston, Texas	1st	Half marathon	1:09:41
2010	USA Marathon Championships	New York City, New York	1st	Marathon	2:28:40
2012	US Olympic Trials	Houston, Texas	1st	Marathon	2:25:38
2014	USA 15 km Championships	Jacksonville, Florida	1st	15 km	47:00
2016	US Olympic Trials	Los Angeles, California	3rd	Marathon	2:29:19

==== Track and field ====
Year	Competition	Venue	Position	Event	Result
2003	USA Outdoor Track and Field Championships	Palo Alto, California	2nd	5000 m	15:20.54
2004	US Olympic Trials	Sacramento, California	3rd	5000 m	15:10.52
2005	USA Outdoor Track and Field Championships	Carson, California	1st	5000 m	15:10.96
2007	USA Indoor Track and Field Championships	Boston, Massachusetts	1st	3000 m	8:56.74
2007	USA Outdoor Track and Field Championships	Indianapolis, Indiana	1st	5000 m	14:51.75
2008	US Olympic Trials	Eugene, Oregon	3rd	5000 m	15:02.81
2008	US Olympic Trials	Eugene, Oregon	1st	10,000 m	31:34.81
2009	USA Outdoor Track and Field Championships	Eugene, Oregon	2nd	10,000 m	31:23.43
2011	USA Outdoor Track and Field Championships	Eugene, Oregon	1st	10,000 m	30:59.97
2012	US Olympic Trials	Eugene, Oregon	3rd	10,000 m	31:59.69
2013	USA Outdoor Track and Field Championships	Des Moines, Iowa	1st	10,000 m	31:43.20
2015	USA Outdoor Track and Field Championships	Eugene, Oregon	5th	5000 m	15:10.02
2015	USA Outdoor Track and Field Championships	Eugene, Oregon	2nd	10,000 m	31:42.29

==== Cross country ====
Year	Competition	Venue	Position	Event	Result
2004	USA Cross Country Championships	Indianapolis, Indiana	1st	Short course 4 km	12:26
2005	USA Cross Country Championships	Vancouver, Washington	1st	Short course 4 km	13:24.3
2007	USA Cross Country Championships	Boulder, Colorado	2nd	Senior race	27:48
2008	USA Cross Country Championships	San Diego, California	1st	Senior race	25:25
2010	USA Cross Country Championships	Spokane, Washington	1st	Senior race	25:09.5
2011	USA Cross Country Championships	San Diego, California	1st	Senior race	25:47
2013	USA Cross Country Championships	St. Louis, Missouri	1st	Senior race	25:49.0

=== NCAA championships ===
==== Track and field ====
Year	Competition	Venue	Position	Event	Result
Representing North Carolina Tar Heels
2001	NCAA Indoor Track and Field Championships	Fayetteville, Arkansas	7th	1 mile	4:45.25
2001	NCAA Outdoor Track and Field Championships	Eugene, Oregon	10th	1500 m	4:25.67
2002	NCAA Indoor Track and Field Championships	Fayetteville, Arkansas	3rd	1 mile	4:39.11
2002	NCAA Indoor Track and Field Championships	Fayetteville, Arkansas	6th	3000 m	9:16.30
2003	NCAA Indoor Track and Field Championships	Fayetteville, Arkansas	1st	3000 m	9:01.05
2003	NCAA Outdoor Track and Field Championships	Sacramento, California	2nd	5000 m	15:30.60

==== Cross country ====
Year	Competition	Venue	Position	Notes
Representing North Carolina Tar Heels
2000	NCAA Cross Country Championships	Ames, Iowa	4th	20:42.7
2001	NCAA Cross Country Championships	Greenville, South Carolina	22nd	21:10
2002	NCAA Cross Country Championships	Terre Haute, Indiana	1st	19:36.0
2003	NCAA Cross Country Championships	Cedar Falls, Iowa	1st	19:30.4

== See also ==
- Lynn Jennings, first American woman to win an Olympic medal in the 10,000 m (1992)
