= Rachel Cliff (athlete) =

Canadian long-distance runner

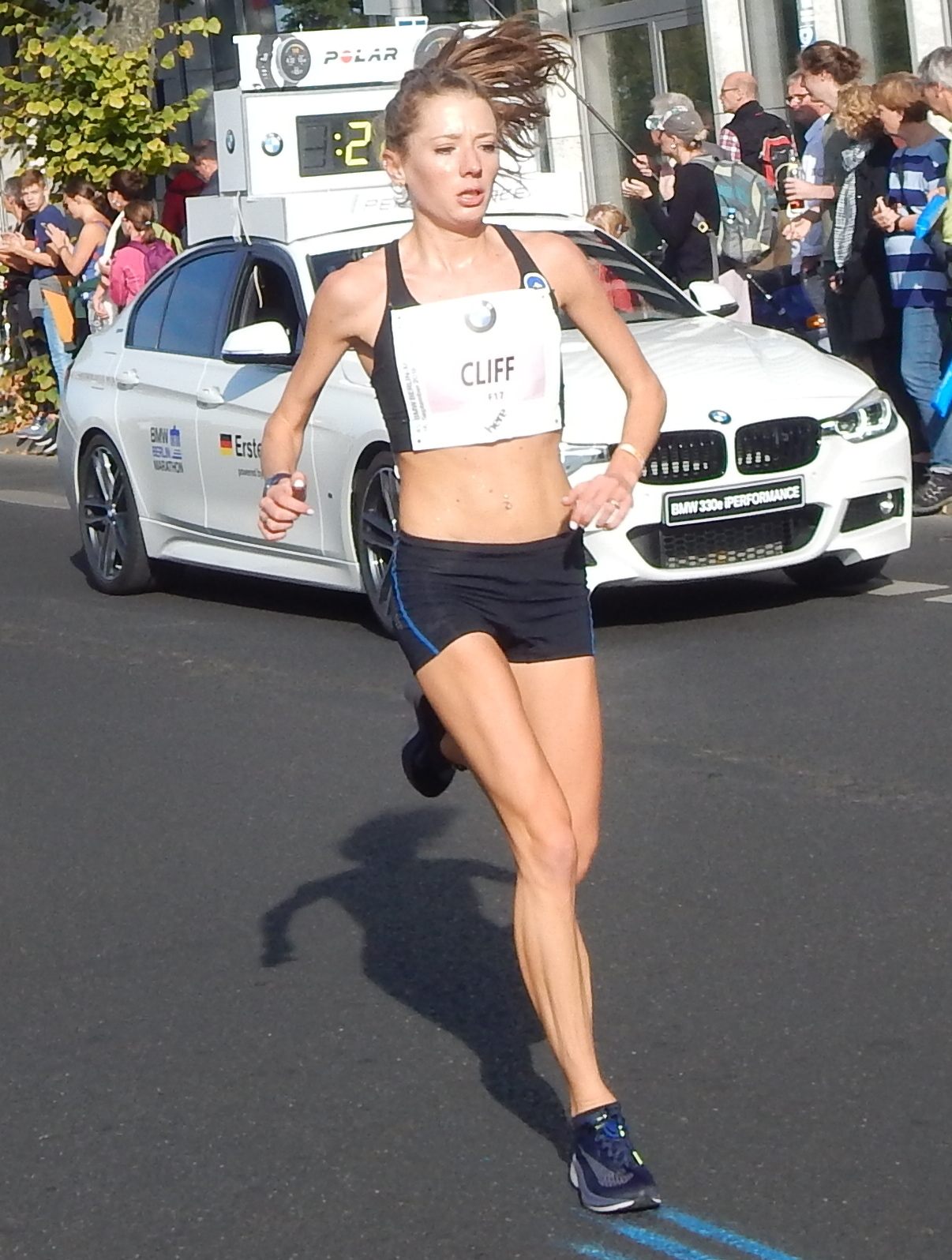
- Cliff at the 2018 Berlin Marathon

Personal information
- Nationality: Canadian
- Born: 1 April 1988 (age 38)

Sport
- Sport: Long-distance running
- Event(s): 10,000 metres, marathon
Medal record
Women's athletics
Representing Canada
Pan American Games
Bronze medal – third place	2019 Lima	10000 m

Rachel Cliff (born 1 April 1988) is a Canadian long-distance runner. She competed in the women's 10,000 meters at the 2017 World Championships in Athletics. In 2018, she set the Canadian record with a time of 1:10:08 in The Woodlands Half-Marathon, in March 2018. The same year, Cliff also secured the fastest ever debut-marathon by a Canadian woman when finishing the 2018 Berlin Marathon in 11th place. She won the bronze medal in the 10,000m at the 2018 NACAC Championships and placed 9th at both the 2015 Universiade 5000m in Korea, as well as the 10,000m at the 2018 Commonwealth Games. At the Nagoya Women's 2019 Marathon, she set the Canadian record, running the Japanese marathon as only her second career marathon ever.
