= Bobby Curtis (runner) =

American long-distance runner (born 1984)

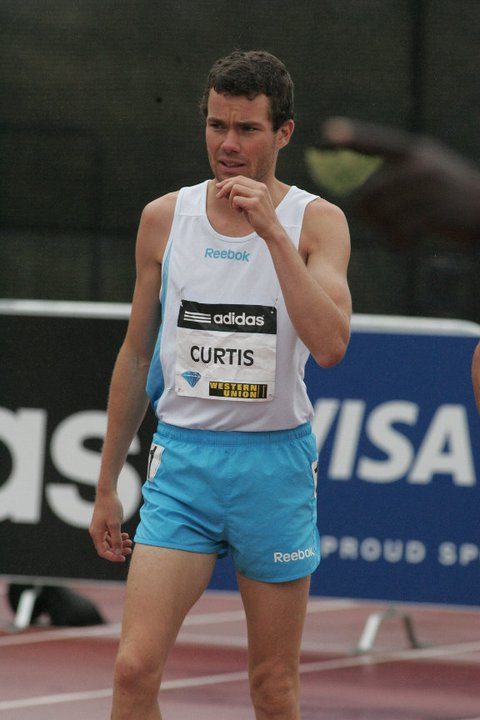
- Curtis at the 2011 IAAF Diamond League

Personal information
- Born: November 28, 1984 (age 41) Madison, Wisconsin, U.S.
- Height: 6 ft 0 in (183 cm)
- Weight: 140 lb (64 kg)

Sport
- Event: All distances from 800m to marathon
- College team: Villanova
- Club: Melbourne Track Club
- Turned pro: 2008
- Coached by: Marcus O'Sullivan; Kevin Hanson; Nic Bideau
- Retired: 2017

Achievements and titles
- Personal bests: Mile: 3:57.20; 3000m: 7:43.65; 2-mile: 8:29.83; 5000m: 13:18.97; 10,000m: 27:24.67 ½ marathon: 1:01:53; Marathon: 2:11:20

Robert M. Curtis (born November 28, 1984) is an American distance runner who ran professionally for the Hansons-Brooks Distance Project. As a student athlete at Villanova, he won the men's 5000 meters at the 2008 NCAA DI National Championship. Over the course of his running career, he struggled with insomnia.

== Running career ==
=== High school ===
Curtis attended St. Xavier in Louisville, Kentucky, where he graduated in 2003. As a high school student, he won 19 state titles; 12 as an individual, two as a member of relay squads, and five as part of a team. He was named an All-American in cross country his sophomore and senior seasons. On March 10, 2002, Curtis won the boy's mile as a junior at the Nike Indoor Classic in Landover, with a time of 4:16.14. At the end of his junior outdoor season, he won the boy's mile in the Adidas Outdoor Track & Field Championships, finishing in 4:09.05. On November 9, 2002, Curtis won Kentucky's state high school cross country championship in Lexington, running the 5-kilometer course in 15:24 on a windy day. On April 11, 2003, he recorded his best high school time for the 3200 meters in 8:48.39 at the Arcadia Invitational. In spite of his performance at Arcadia, he still finished in fourth place among a deep field of runners; the race was won by Chris Solinsky in 8:43.24. Later that summer he set the US high school record in the outdoor 1000 meters, with a time of 2:24.79.

=== Collegiate ===
Curtis was recruited by Villanova University. In February 2005, he began experiencing insomnia a night before a race. Eventually, he left school for six months due to his insomnia. After practicing sleep restriction therapy with the guidance of medical professionals, he gradually returned to an improved sleep schedule and returned to Villanova. In the fall of 2004, Curtis, then a sophomore, won his first Big East championship when he topped the field in cross country. He followed that performance with a 15th-place showing in that year's NCAA cross country nationals, earning collegiate All-American honors for the first time. Over the next two years, Curtis suffered various injuries and setbacks, and it wasn't until the spring of 2007 that he returned completely healthy to competition. In the outdoor track season of 2007, Curtis ran a mile in 3:57.20, his first sub-4:00 mile. He also won the NCAA East Regional 5000m race and placed second in the event at the NCAA Championships.

In his senior year (2007–08) at Villanova, Curtis enjoyed his greatest success. He won the 2007 Big East championship in cross country and finished fourth at that year's NCAA Championships, again earning All-American honors. In the spring, he won his second-consecutive NCAA East Regional 5000m, and at the national championships, he posted a personal best time of 13:33.93 to win the race, his first national title as a collegian. His win made him Villanova's first outdoor individual national champion since Sydney Maree won the 1500m at the 1981 nationals. Curtis left Villanova having posted the second fastest 5000m time (behind Maree) in school history.

=== Professional ===
In the summer of 2008, Curtis signed a five-year contract with Reebok. Also in that year, he began to be coached by Nic Bideau. He briefly trained with Craig Mottram in 2008. In March 2009, he experienced insomnia again, although his sleep improved less than a year later. From 2008 to 2012, he trained regularly with Melbourne Track Club along with Olympians Collis Birmingham and Ben St. Lawrence. During his time with Reebok, Curtis posted impressive times in the 3,000 meters (7:43), 5,000 meters (13:18), 10,000 meters (27:24) and half-marathon (1:01:53). Curtis represented Team USA at three international championships while with Reebok: The 2009 IAAF World Cross Country Championships in Jordan, the 2010 IAAF World Cross Country Championships in Poland and the 2010 International Chiba Ekiden in Japan. In 2011 Curtis made his premier in the marathon in the New York City Marathon and finished 14th overall in a time of 2:16:44. In 2012 Curtis qualified for the 10,000 meters in the U.S. Olympic Trials. He finished 10th in a time of 27:58.48.

Curtis was then sponsored by Brooks Sports and joined the Hansons-Brooks Distance Project. He went on to win the 2013 Gasparilla Distance Classic 8k in a course record 23:30, placed 2nd (43:40) in the 2013 US 15 km Championships at the Gate River Run and 4th (28:42) in the 2013 US 10k championships at the Peachtree Road Race. He ran his second marathon in Fukuoka, Japan on December 1, 2013, finishing in 2:13:24. He finished the 2014 Chicago marathon in 9th place overall (first American finisher) in a new personal best time of 2:11:20. Most recently, Curtis finished second overall at the 2015 USA Cross Country Championship, thereby qualifying for a spot on Team USA for the 2015 IAAF World Cross Country Championship in China.
