= Brian Sell =

American long-distance runner

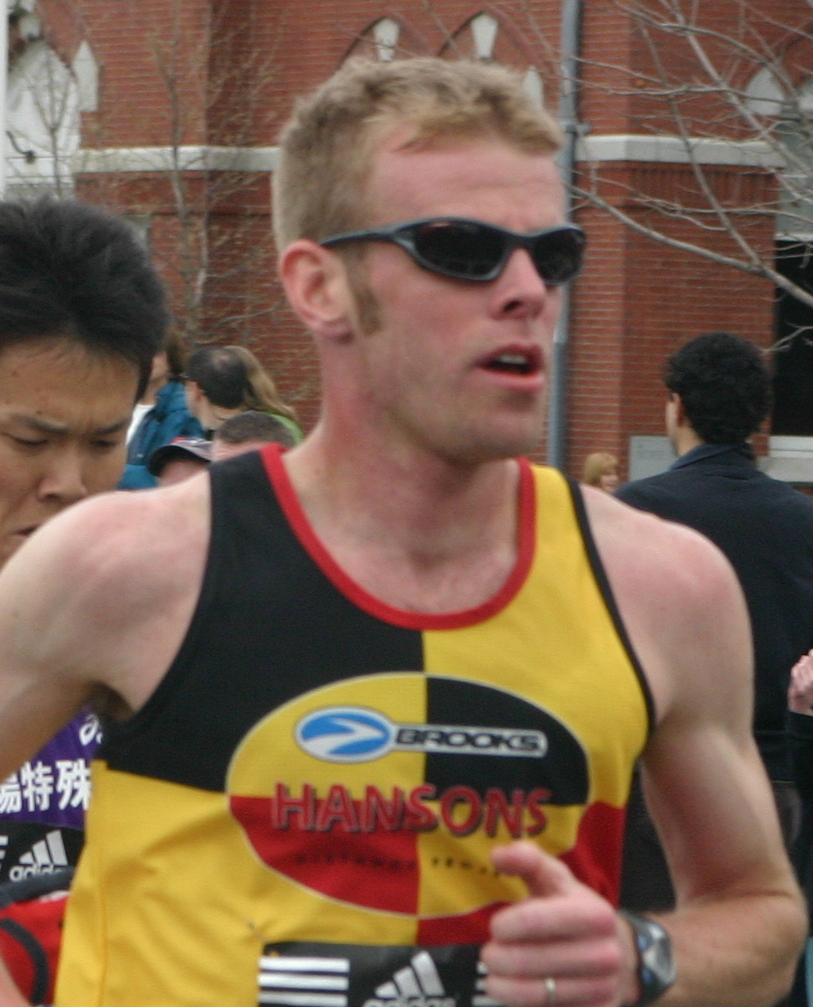
- Sell at the 2006 Boston Marathon

Personal information
- Born: April 11, 1978 (age 48) Altoona, Pennsylvania, U.S.

Sport
- Sport: Track, Long-distance running
- Events: 10,000 meters, Marathon
- College team: Saint Francis

Achievements and titles
- Personal bests: half marathon 1:02:11 10,000 meters: 28:28.56; Marathon: 2:10:47

Brian Sell (born April 11, 1978) is a retired American long-distance runner who specialized in various long-distance track events before specializing as a marathoner in his professional career with Hansons-Brooks Distance Project. Sell represented the United States at the 2008 Summer Olympics in the men's marathon. He attended Saint Francis University in Loretto, Pennsylvania, where he ran on the Saint Francis University cross country team.

== Running career ==
=== High school ===
Sell attended Northern Bedford High School, where he participated in multiple sports. In addition to running he was a wrestler as well as a wide receiver on the football team, and did not join the track team until his sophomore year. His best track times by the end of his senior year were 4:28 (min:sec) in the 1600-meter and 10:06 in the 3200-meter.

=== Collegiate ===
Sell began at Messiah College, then transferred to study at Saint Francis University, where his athletic career reached new heights. He represented SFU at the 2000 NCAA Division I XC Championships, where he ran the 10K in 31:17.1 and was a two time All-American.

=== Post-collegiate ===
Sell placed third overall in the 2008 USA Olympic Team Trials Marathon in Central Park, New York City on November 3, 2007, with a time of 2:11:40, earning him a spot, along with Ryan Hall and Dathan Ritzenhein, on the U.S. men's marathon team at the 2008 Summer Olympics in Beijing, where he finished the Olympic Marathon in 22nd place with a time of 2:16:7.

Sell ran the 2009 New York Marathon, which he and his coach have indicated was his last competitive race.

== Achievement chronology ==
- 2002 – 3rd at USATF Fall Cross Country Championships
- 2002 – Chiba Ekiden Relay Team
- 2002 – 8th at USATF Championships 10K (road)
- 2002 – 8th at USATF Championships 8K (road)
- 2002 – 4th at USATF Championships 7 mile (road)
- 2003 – 13th at USA 2004 Olympic Trials Marathon (after leading through 21 miles)
- 2003 – 25th at IAAF World Half Marathon Championships (1st American)
- 2003 – 2nd at USATF Championships 20K (road) (5th fastest American 20k time ever 59:18)
- 2003 – 8th at USATF Championships 8K (road)
- 2004/2005 – 1st place LaSalle Bank Shamrock Shuffle
- 2005 – 2nd at USATF Championships 10 mile (road)
- 2005 – 1st place USATF 25K
- 2005 – 9th at World Championships marathon, Helsinki, Finland
- 2006 – 1st place USA Half Marathon Championships
- 2006 – 4th place Boston Marathon in a PR 2:10:55
- 2006 – Reed’s Lake 10K Champion 29:02
- 2006 – Chicago Distance Classic Champion 1:04:25
- 2006 – 6th place Chicago Marathon in a PR 2:10:47
- 2007 – 1st place Sauder's Egg Run
- 2007 – 1st place USATF 25K Championships
- 2007 – 3rd place USA 2008 Olympic Trials Marathon (qualifying for Olympic team)
- 2008 – 1st place Miami Half Marathon, 1:03:46
- 2008 – 22nd place, 3rd American at the Men's Olympic Marathon, 2:16:07
- 2008 – 1st place Rock 'n Roll San Antonio Half Marathon, 1:02:50
- 2009 – 5th place 2009 USA Half Marathon Championships, 1:02:36

== See also ==
- List of Pennsylvania State University Olympians
