= Tonya Nero =

Trinidad and Tobago long-distance runner

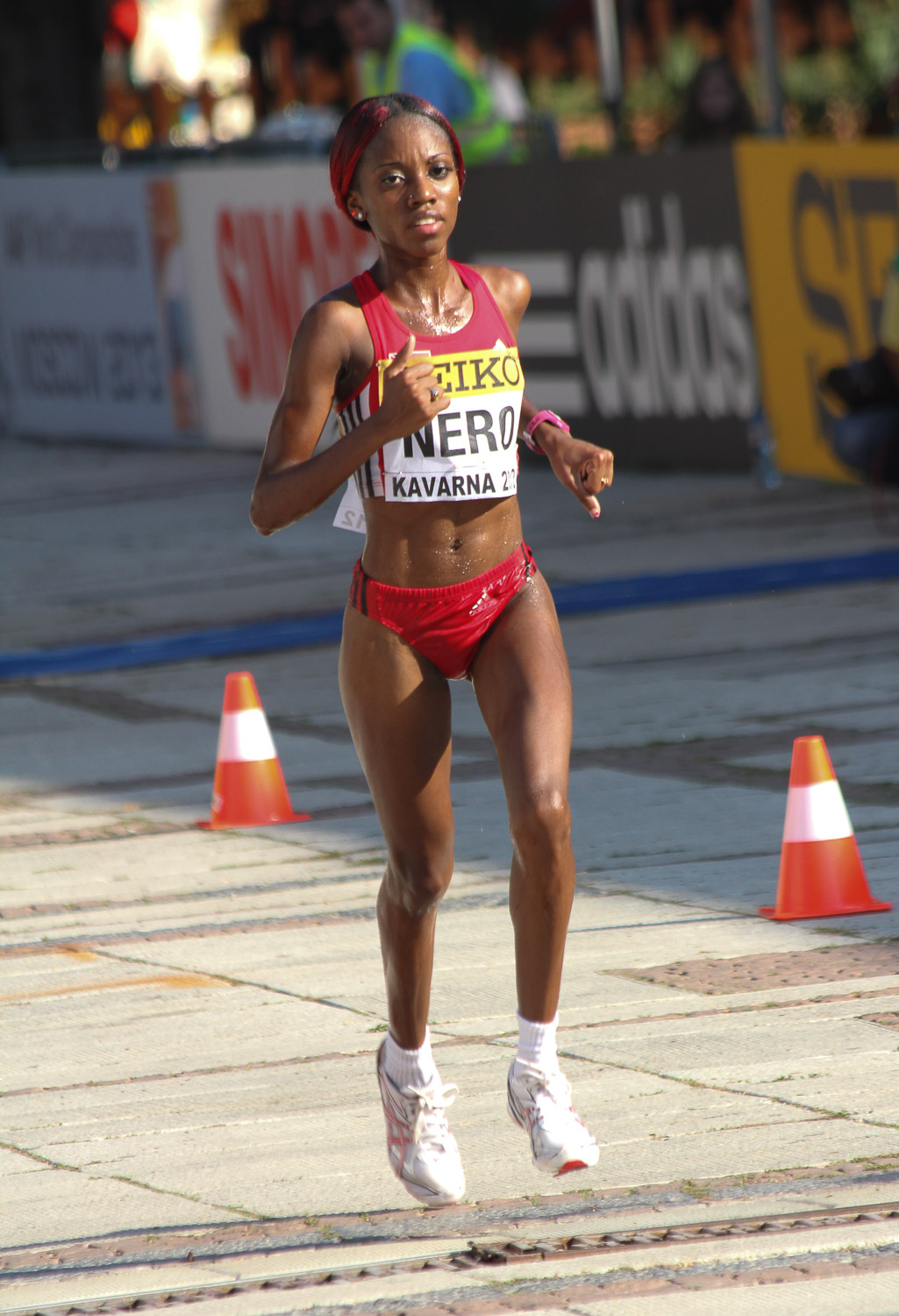
- Tonya Nero at the 2012 World Half Marathon Championships

Personal information
- Born: 27 November 1988 (age 36)

Sport
- Country: Trinidad and Tobago
- Event: Long-distance running

Tonya Nero (born 27 November 1988) is a Trinidad and Tobago long-distance runner. She holds national records in the 5k, 10k, half marathon, and marathon.

Nero was an All-American in the 10,000 m at the 2011 NCAA Division I Outdoor Track and Field Championships for the Wichita State Shockers track and field team.

She competed at the 2012, 2014, 2016 and 2018 editions of the World Half Marathon Championships. Her best finish was 27th at the 2012 edition in Kavarna, Bulgaria, when she set the Trinidad & Tobago national record with a time of 1:15:13.

In 2019, she competed in the women's 10,000 metres at the Pan American Games held in Lima, Peru. She finished in 10th place with a time of 34:15.36.

== Athletic career ==
Nero represented Trinidad and Tobago at the 2014 Commonwealth Games held in Glasgow, Scotland in the women's 10,000 metres event, where she finished 12th out of 13 competitors. In 2016, she won the Run Barbados 10k event.

She competed in the World Half Marathon Championships for Trinidad & Tobago from 2012 to 2018.

She competed in the women's marathon at the 2018 Commonwealth Games held in Gold Coast, Australia, finishing in 14th place.
