= Elyse Kopecky =

Elyse Kopecky (born December 4, 1981) is a nutrition coach, marathoner and the co-author with Shalane Flanagan of three running cookbooks which introduced superhero muffins.

Run Fast. Eat Slow was Kopecky and Flanagan's debut book, followed by Run Fast, Cook Fast, Eat Slow and Rise and Run (2021). Each of the books, which focus on nutrition for runners, became a best-seller.

Kopecky is a UNC Chapel Hill graduate.
