= Natasha Wodak =

Canadian long-distance runner

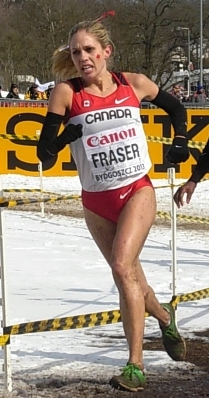
- Natasha Fraser at the 2013 IAAF World Cross Country Championships

Personal information
- Born: 17 December 1981 (age 44) Surrey, British Columbia, Canada
- Education: Simon Fraser University
- Height: 161 cm (5 ft 3 in)
- Weight: 47 kg (104 lb)

Sport
- Sport: Track and field
- Events: 10,000 metres, Half marathon
- Club: BC Endurance Project
Medal record
Women's athletics
Representing Canada
Pan American Games
Gold medal – first place	2019 Lima	10,000 m

Natasha Wodak (divorced Fraser, born 17 December 1981) is a Canadian long-distance runner. She competed in the 10,000 metres at the 2015 World Championships in Athletics in Beijing, China, placing 23rd. Wodak formerly held the Canadian 10,000m record.

In July 2016, Wodak was named to the Canadian Olympic team for the 2016 Summer Olympic Games, where she finished 22nd.

At the 2019 Pan American Games, Wodak won gold in the 10,000m with a time of 31:55.17, breaking the Games record by over 45 seconds. In June 2021, she qualified to represent Canada at the 2020 Summer Olympics, finishing 13th overall.

September 25, 2022 she set a new Canadian women's marathon record of two hours 23 minutes 12 seconds, competing in the Berlin Marathon in Germany.

At the 2023 World Athletics Championships, Wodak finished in 15th.

== International competitions ==
Year	Competition	Venue	Position	Event	Notes
Representing Canada
2013	Jeux de la Francophonie	Nice, France	4th	10,000 m	33:31.02
2013	Rock ‘n’ Roll San Jose Half Marathon	San Jose, United States	1st	Half Marathon	1:14:39
2015	Pan American Games	Toronto, Canada	7th	10,000 m	33:20.14
2015	World Championships	Beijing, China	23rd	10,000 m	32:59.20
2016	Olympic Games	Rio de Janeiro, Brazil	22nd	10,000 m	31:53.14
2017	World Championships	London, United Kingdom	16th	10,000 m	31:55.47
2018	Commonwealth Games	Gold Coast, Australia	5th	10,000 m	31:50.18
2019	Pan American Games	Lima, Peru	1st	10,000 m	31:55.17
2019	World Championships	Doha, Qatar	17th	10,000 m	32:31.19
2021	Olympic Games	Sapporo, Japan	13th	Marathon	2:31:41
2023	World Championships	Budapest, Hungary	15th	Marathon	2:30:09
2025	World Championships	Tokyo, Japan	31st	Marathon	2:36:02

== Personal bests ==
Outdoor

- 1500 metres - 4:15.27 (Burnaby 2018)
- 5000 metres – 15:29.44 (Portland 2018)
- 10,000 metres – 31:41.59 (Palo Alto 2015)
- 10 kilometres – 31:59 (Ottawa 2015)
- 20 kilometres – 1:07:41 (New York 2015)
- Half marathon – 1:09:41 (Houston 2020)
- Marathon – 2:23:12 NR (Berlin 2022)

Indoor

- 3000 metres – 9:02.57 (Seattle 2013)
