= Every Woman's Marathon =

American road race

- Date: November 16, 2024
- Location: Savannah, Georgia in 2024; Scottsdale, Arizona in 2025
- Event type: Paved Road
- Distance: 26.2 miles (42.2 km)
- Primary sponsor: Milk Processor Education Program
- Established: 2024
- Course records: women: Khia Kurtenbach (2024), 2:46:14 men: Jacob Alexander (2024), 2:46:22 non-binary: Flor Ward (2024), 4:28:40
- Website: everywomansmarathon.com
- Participants: over 7000

Every Woman's Marathon (EWM) is an annual marathon with its first event taking place in Savannah, Georgia in the United States in 2024. Each year, it moves to a new city. It is significant because it was designed to be a female-centric marathon on a "for women, by women" model. The race's advisory board includes Kathrine Switzer, Deena Kastor, and Desiree Linden.

Despite its name, men and non-binary runners are welcome to and have competed in EWM.

== Race course ==
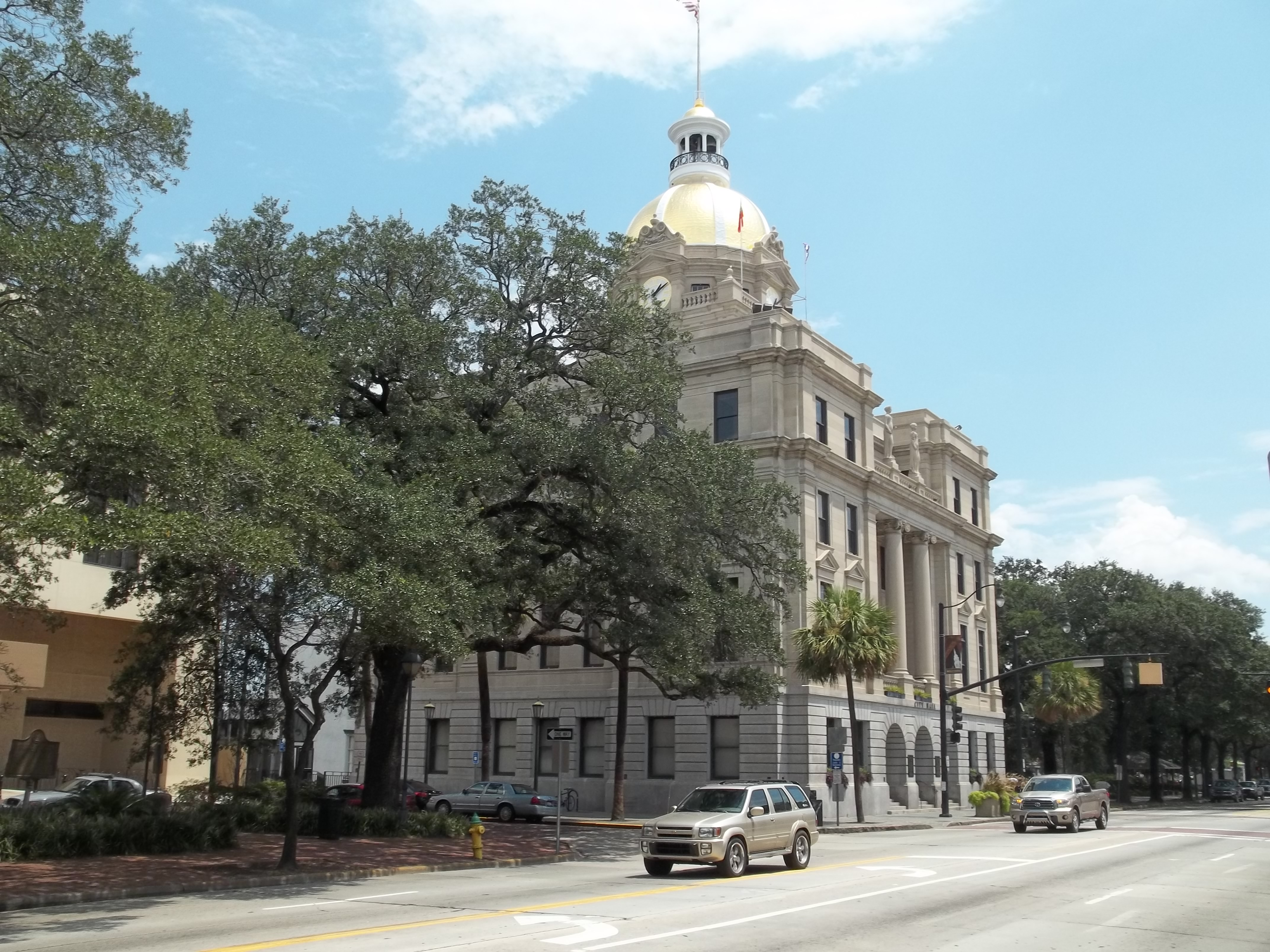
Savannah City Hall where the Every Woman's Marathon started in 2024

The 2024 race started in front of Savannah City Hall on East Bay Street. The course visited 15 Savannah neighborhoods and landmarks such as Trustees' Garden before finishing at the YMCA of Coastal Georgia on East Broad Street. The race was designed to be flat and fast and has a total elevation gain of 304 feet (93 m).

The course boasts several features designed to appeal to women runners. First, the portable toilets at the start, finish, and along the race course are numerous, clean, and stocked with tampons, pads, and hair ties. The course is kept open for 7 hours and 45 minutes which is longer than many other marathons. There are lactation stations at the start of the race and along the course. Strollers are also permitted in the race.

== Race history ==
The city of Savannah announced the creation of the EWM in January 2024. Savannah Mayor Van R. Johnson said it was important the race "respects our city" and underscored that "Savannah is a place to live first." The race's sponsor, Team Milk, agreed to pay all operational expenses. This was important to the city because the city terminated its agreement with the Rock 'n' Roll Running Series in 2022 due to a perceived excess focus on profit and lack of respect for the city itself. EWM agreed to donate up to $200,000 to local non-profits including the Historic Savannah Foundation and offer eight event management internships for students at Savannah State University.

The inaugural EWM was run on November 16, 2024. Khia Kurtenbach won the overall and women's race in 2:46:14, while Jacob Alexander won the men's race with a time of 2:46:22 and Flor Ward won the non-binary race with a time of 4:28:40. There were 4,307 finishers, making the race the 17th largest race in the United States in 2024. Kathrine Switzer was at the finish line greeting finishers.

The start of the 2024 race was briefly disrupted by a protest organized by People for the Ethical Treatment of Animals (PETA) who protested the race's affiliation with the dairy industry in the United States. In addition, PETA released an advertisement criticizing poet Amanda Gorman for promoting the EWM. The Milk Processor Education Program commissioned a poem from Amanda Gorman to create an "international mantra" of women's strength and empowerment, which was used to promote the EWM.

British singer Natasha Bedingfield performed at the 2024 EWM post-race celebration.

In December 2024, Savannah city leaders discussed the future of EWM. On the positive side, the event was viewed positively by participants and the race brought an estimated 4,500 participants from outside of Savannah. On the negative side, residents complained about road closures. To minimize the impact on local residents, the director for the Office of Special Events, Film and Tourism said the city was developing "performance criteria" to be applied if the race is held in Savannah in 2025. A community session was held in August 2024 to discuss race day road closures and cheering zones.

The 2025 Every Woman's Marathon took place in Scottsdale, Arizona.

The 2026 event will take place in New Orleans, Louisiana.
