= Anne-Marie Blaney =

American long-distance runner

Personal information
- Born: September 9, 1993 (age 32) Ocala, Florida
- Years active: 2014–present

Sport
- Country: United States
- Event: Long-distance running
- University team: UCF Knights
- Turned pro: 2019

Anne-Marie Blaney (born September 9, 1993) is an American long-distance runner. In 2019, she competed in the senior women's race at the 2019 IAAF World Cross Country Championships and finished in 51st place. In 2024, Blaney was inducted into the UCF Athletics Hall of Fame. Blaney is currently a member of the Hanson-Brooks Distance Project.
