= Tera Moody =

American long-distance runner

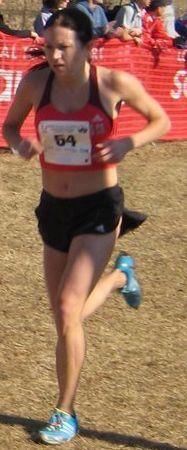

Personal information
- Born: 18 December 1980 (age 45) St. Charles, Illinois
- Height: 5 ft 8 in (1.73 m)

Sport
- Country: USA
- Event: Marathon
- College team: Colorado Buffaloes
- Club: Marathon Performance (Colorado Springs, Colorado)
- Coached by: Brad Hudson

Achievements and titles
- World finals: 2009, Marathon, 28th
- Personal best: Marathon: 2:30:53

Tera Moody (born December 18, 1980) is a retired American track and field athlete, who competes in the marathon and other long distance running events. Moody represented the United States at the 2009 World Championships in the marathon. She also placed 17th in the 2011 World Championships in 2:32:04

Moody has had insomnia since sixth grade. In 2005, she was diagnosed with sleep apnea, and has tried many different treatments, including visiting the Mayo Clinic, sleeping pills, a mouth guard, and a device to regulate her breathing. She now takes melatonin, a natural supplement. Despite running more than a hundred miles a week, she still rarely sleeps more than a couple hours a night. In high school, Moody was a two-time Illinois champion in the mile for St. Charles East High School, near Chicago.

She went on to compete for the Colorado Buffaloes in both Cross Country and Track. She won the Big 12 title in the 10,000 meters as a freshman and ran on Colorado's NCAA champion cross-country team as a sophomore in 2000. After graduating from Colorado, Moody took a break from training seriously and became a personal trainer and real estate agent. She then started her own real estate business. She participated in the 2005 Chicago Marathon with a goal to break three hours. After finishing in 2:50:04, she again ran the marathon in 2006, improving by four minutes. In 2007, she qualified the U.S. Olympic Marathon trials by finishing in 2:46:40.

Moody's breakthrough came at the 2008 U.S. Olympic Marathon trials in Boston, where despite being seeded 152nd, she finished fifth with a time of 2:33:54. This was a twelve-minute improvement of her personal best. Moody was one second behind fourth-place finisher Zoila Gomez.

In 2009, Moody participated in a variety of races, finishing fourth at the 25 km U.S. championships in Grand Rapids, Michigan. She also finished second at the Bank of America Shamrock Shuffle, and fourteenth at the Bolder Boulder.

At the 2009 World Championships in the marathon, Moody was a part of the United States marathon team. She finished 28th in a time of 2:36:39, and was the third American. Moody also ran the 2009 Chicago Marathon, which she finished with a then personal best of 2:32:59, for 9th place. Her PR of 2:30:53 was achieved at the 2010 Chicago Marathon.

Moody was selected again for the US team for the World Championships in 2011 in Daegu, South Korea. In warm and humid conditions Moody was the top US finisher in 17th place overall in 2:32:04.

At the 2012 US Olympic Trials for the marathon, Moody was a DNS. Tera suffered an injury to her hamstrings in November.

Moody returned to the racing at 2013 Houston Marathon after 18 months buildup following the hamstring injury to finish 6th place in 2:39.10 and was the top American woman.

Tera ran the fastest US 50 mile road race time for 2017 in 6 hours and 19 minutes. She currently competes in ultra ElliptiGO events, and holds the women's 24-hour distance record of 269.7 miles.

== Achievements ==
| Year | Competition | Venue | Position | Notes |
Representing the United States
| 2009 | World Championships | Berlin, Germany | 28th | Marathon |
