= Jake Riley =

American long-distance runner (born 1988)

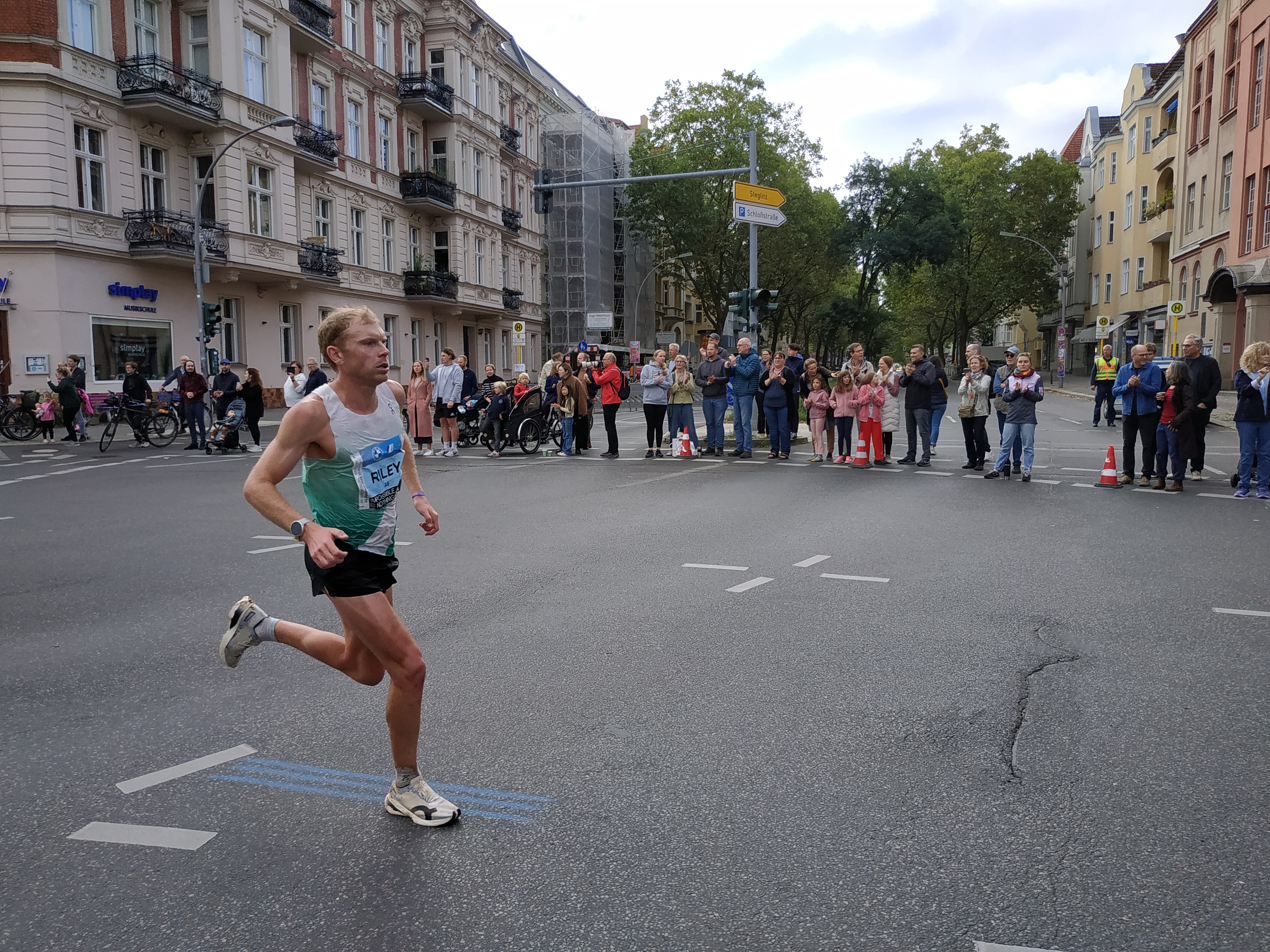
- Jake Riley at 2023 Berlin Marathon

Personal information
- Full name: Jacob Riley
- Nationality: American
- Born: November 2, 1988 (age 37)
- Home town: Bellingham, Washington, U.S.
- Education: Stanford University

Sport
- Sport: Long-distance running
- Events: 10000 metres; Half marathon; Marathon
- University team: Stanford Cardinal
- Club: Boulder Track Club
- Coached by: Lee Troop
- Retired: 2024

Achievements and titles
- Olympic finals: 2020; Marathon, 28th
- Personal best: Marathon: 2:10:02 (2020)

Jacob Riley (born November 2, 1988) is a retired American long-distance runner. He placed second behind Galen Rupp at the 2020 United States Olympic Trials (marathon), securing a spot at the 2020 Tokyo Olympics (which were rescheduled to start July 2021 due to the COVID-19 pandemic). Riley finished the race in a personal best time of 2:10:02. Riley was the first American (and ninth overall finisher) in the 2019 Chicago marathon, in a time of 2:10:36.

Riley represents the Boulder Track Club where he is coached by Lee Troop. Previously, he ran for the Hansons-Brooks Original Distance Project. In the 2016 US Olympic Trials Marathon, Riley finished 15th in 02:18:31. Riley won the 2012 USATF Club Cross Country Championship, covering the 10k race in a time of 29:58.

== Collegiate career ==
In college, Riley competed for Stanford University, where he was an 8-time All-American. Riley placed third in the 10,000m at the 2010 NCAA Championship, in a time of 28:57.41.

== Personal life ==
Riley is from Bellingham, Washington, and resides in Boulder, Colorado.

== Personal bests ==
Surface	Distance	Time	Date	Location	Notes
Outdoor track	5000 m	13:32.82	May 18, 2012	Los Angeles	
Outdoor track	10,000 m	27:59.37	May 2, 2015	Palo Alto	
Road racing	Half marathon	1:02:56	March 16, 2014	New York	
Road racing	Marathon	2:10:02	February 29, 2020	Atlanta	2nd place in US Trials
