= Athletics at the 2015 Pan American Games – Women's 10,000 metres =

Women's 10,000 metres at the 2015 Pan American Games
- Venue: CIBC Pan Am and Parapan Am Athletics Stadium
- Dates: July 23
- Competitors: 14 from 10 nations
- Winning time: 32:41.33

Medalists
Gold medal	Brenda Flores	Mexico
Silver medal	Desiree Davila	United States
Bronze medal	Lanni Marchant	Canada

The women's 10 000 metres sprint competition of the athletics events at the 2015 Pan American Games took place on July 23 at the CIBC Pan Am and Parapan Am Athletics Stadium in Toronto, Canada. The defending Pan American Games champion is Marisol Romero of Mexico.

== Records ==
Prior to this competition, the existing world and Pan American Games records were as follows:

World record	Junxia Wang (CHN)	29:31.78	Beijing, China	September 8, 1993
Pan American Games record	Sara Slattery (USA)	32:54.41	Rio de Janeiro, Brazil	July 23, 2007

== Qualification ==
Each National Olympic Committee (NOC) was able to enter up to two entrants providing they had met the minimum standard (35.51.00) in the qualifying period (January 1, 2014 to June 28, 2015).

== Schedule ==
Date	Time	Round
July 23, 2015	19:40	Final

== Results ==
All times shown are in seconds.

KEY:	q	Fastest non-qualifiers	Q	Qualified	NR	National record	PB	Personal best	SB	Seasonal best	DQ	Disqualified

=== Final ===
Rank	Name	Nationality	Time	Notes
1st place, gold medalist(s)	Brenda Flores	Mexico	32:41.33	PR
2nd place, silver medalist(s)	Desiree Davila	United States	32:43.99	SB
3rd place, bronze medalist(s)	Lanni Marchant	Canada	32:46.03	
4	Liz Costello	United States	32:53.52	
5	Inés Melchor	Peru	33:07.66	
6	Marisol Romero	Mexico	33:16.12	
7	Natasha Wodak	Canada	33:20.14	
8	Tatiele Roberta de Carvalho	Brazil	33:24.33	SB
9	Rosa Godoy	Argentina	33:29.41	
10	Carolina Tabares	Colombia	33:42.54	
11	Yudileyvis Castillo	Cuba	33:45.76	NR
12	María Pastuña	Ecuador	34:05.84	
13	Rosmery Quispe	Bolivia	35:03.35	
	Gladys Tejeda	Peru	DNS	
