= Brenda Flores (runner) =

Mexican long-distance runner

Personal information
- Born: 4 September 1991 (age 34) Ciudad Nezahualcóyotl, Mexico

Sport
- Sport: Track and field
- Events: 5000 metres 10,000 metres
Medal record
Representing Mexico
Pan American Games
Gold medal – first place	2015 Toronto	10,000 m
Silver medal – second place	2015 Toronto	5000 m
Central American and Caribbean Games
Gold medal – first place	2014 Veracruz	5000 m
Gold medal – first place	2014 Veracruz	10,000 m

Brenda Eunice Flores Muñoz (born 4 September 1991) is a Mexican long-distance runner. She was a double gold medallist for Mexico at the 2014 Central American and Caribbean Games and a silver medallist at the 2015 Pan American Games. She represented the Americas at the 2014 IAAF Continental Cup.

== Career ==
Flores grew up in the State of Mexico near the Mexican capital. She was inspired to take up athletics after seeing Mexican Ana Guevara claim the 400 metres world title in 2003. Flores made her start over 800 metres, but gradually moved up in distance as she failed to progress at shorter ones. Becoming a long-distance runner, she began instead to look to Mexico's former New York Marathon champion Adriana Fernández as a role model.

Flores claimed her first international medals at the 2013 Central American and Caribbean Championships in Athletics, held on home turf in Morelia, where she beat Pan American Games champion Adriana Muñoz to the 1500 metres gold medal and also claimed the 5000 metres silver medal behind her teammate Marisol Romero.

She set several personal bests in the 2014, including a 5000 m run of 15:30.87 minutes as runner-up at the Mt. SAC Relays, a 10,000 metres time of 32:49.09 minutes to win at the Portland Track Festival and a 3000 metres best of 9:10.29 minutes at the Meeting de Atletismo Madrid. Her native Mexico was the host of two major competitions that year and she won medals at both: she was the inaugural 5000 m champion at the Pan American Sports Festival and claimed a 5000 m/10,000 m long-distance double at the Central American and Caribbean Games, which included a games record in the shorter event. She also gained her first global level call-up that year, representing the Americas at the 2014 IAAF Continental Cup, where she placed sixth in the 5000 m.

Flores ran at the New York Half Marathon in March 2015 and although she set a new best of 73:54 minutes for the distance, this was only enough for 19th in the high calibre race. Returning to the track, she knocked over a minute off her 10,000 m at the Payton Jordan Cardinal Invitational in May. She reached another international podium at the 2015 Pan American Games in Toronto, taking the 5000 m silver medal behind Brazil's Juliana Paula dos Santos.

In 2020, she competed in the women's half marathon at the 2020 World Athletics Half Marathon Championships held in Gdynia, Poland.

== Personal bests ==
- 3000 metres – 9:10.29 min (2014)
- 5000 metres – 15:30.87 min (2014)
- 10,000 metres – 31:45.16 min (2015)
- Half marathon – 73:54 min (2015)

== International competitions ==
Year	Competition	Venue	Position	Event	Notes
2013	Central American and Caribbean Championships	Morelia, Mexico	1st	1500 m	4:27.55
2013	Central American and Caribbean Championships	Morelia, Mexico	2nd	5000 m	17:11.89
2014	Pan American Sports Festival	Mexico City, Mexico	1st	5000 m	16:54.60
2014	IAAF Continental Cup	Marrakesh, Morocco	6th	5000 m	16:19.07
2014	Central American and Caribbean Games	Veracruz City, Mexico	1st	5000 m	16:02.64 GR
2014	Central American and Caribbean Games	Veracruz City, Mexico	1st	10,000 m	35:54.44
2015	Pan American Games	Toronto, Canada	2nd	5000 m	15:47.19
2015	World Championships	Beijing, China	14th	10,000 m	32:15.26
2016	Olympic Games	Rio de Janeiro, Brazil	32nd	10,000 m	32:39.08
2017	Universiade	Taipei, Taiwan	–	10,000 m	DNF
