= Deena Kastor =

American long-distance runner

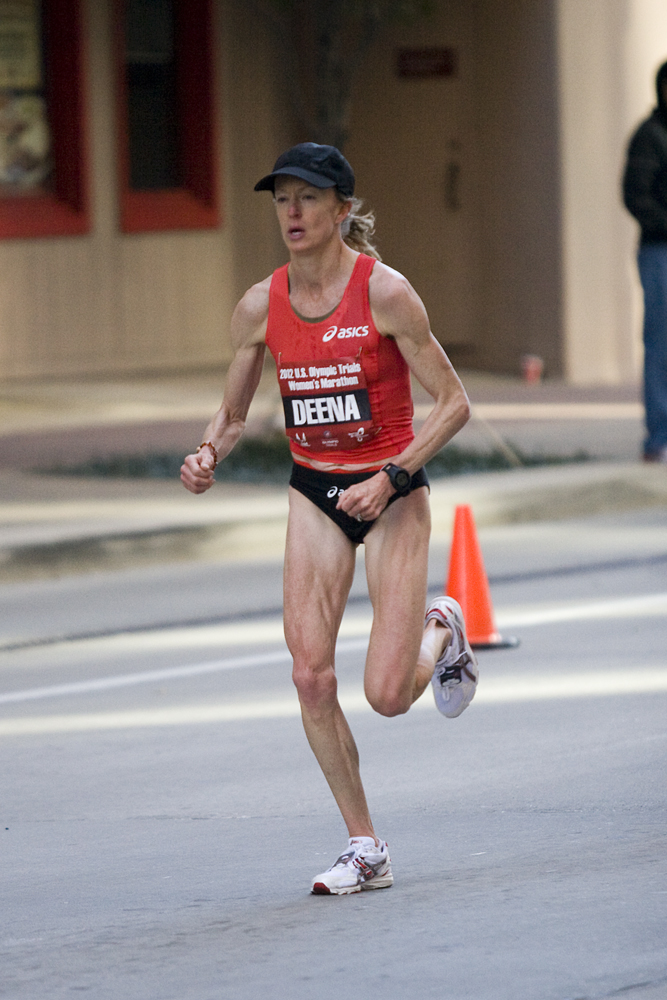
- Kastor at the 2012 US Olympic Marathon Trials

Personal information
- Born: Deena Michelle Drossin; February 14, 1973 (age 53) Waltham, Massachusetts, U.S.
- Height: 5 ft 4 in (1.63 m)
- Website: www.deena-kastor.com

Sport
- Country: United States
- Events: Marathon, 10,000 m
- College team: Arkansas Razorbacks
- Club: ASICS Mammoth Track Club
- Team: ASICS
- Coached by: Andrew Kastor

Achievements and titles
- Olympic finals: 2000 Sydney; 10,000 m, 18th (h); 2004 Athens; Marathon, Bronze; 2008 Beijing; Marathon, DNF
- World finals: 1999 Seville; 10,000 m, 11th 2001 Edmonton; 10,000 m, 11th 2003 Paris; 10,000 m, 12th 2007 Osaka; 10,000 m, 5th 2013 Moscow; Marathon, 9th
- Personal bests: 1500 m: 4:07.82 (Hechtel 2000); 3000 m: 8:42.59 (Zürich 2000); 5000 m: 14:51.62 (Stockholm 2000); 10,000 m: 30:50.32 (Palo Alto 2002); Half marathon: 1:07:34 (Berlin 2006); Marathon: 2:19:36 (London 2006)
Medal record
Women's Athletics
Representing the United States
Olympic Games
Bronze medal – third place	2004 Athens	Marathon
World Cross Country Championships
Silver medal – second place	2002 Dublin	Individual
Silver medal – second place	2002 Dublin	Team
Silver medal – second place	2003 Lausanne	Individual
Bronze medal – third place	2000 Vilamoura	Team
Bronze medal – third place	2003 Lausanne	Team
World Marathon Majors
Gold medal – first place	2005 Chicago	Marathon
Gold medal – first place	2006 London	Marathon
Bronze medal – third place	2003 London	Marathon
Summer Universiade
Gold medal – first place	1997 Catania	10,000m

Deena Michelle Kastor (née Drossin; February 14, 1973) is an American long-distance runner. She is the former American record holder in the marathon (2003-2022) and numerous road distances. Kastor held 15 American records simultaneously in every distance from 5K to the marathon. She won the bronze medal in the women's marathon at the 2004 Olympics in Athens, Greece. Kastor won the 2005 Chicago Marathon and the 2006 London Marathon. In 2006 she was ranked #1 in the world. She is also a 24 time National Champion, including eight-time national champion in cross country.

== Early and personal life ==
Kastor was adopted into a Jewish family. She is an alumna of Agoura High School located in Agoura Hills, California. She ran collegiately for the University of Arkansas.

She is married to Andrew Kastor. In August 2010, they announced that she was three months pregnant with their first child, Piper. As a result, she announced she would not compete in that year's New York City Marathon, held November 7. Her daughter was born in February 2011.

== Career highlights ==
In high school, Kastor won three California state cross country titles and two CIF California State Meet titles at 3200 meters while running for Agoura High School in Agoura Hills, California. She also competed in the Foot Locker Cross Country Championships all four years of her prep career, and competed in both the North American Youth Maccabi Games and the Pan-American Maccabiah while in high school.

At the University of Arkansas she was a four-time SEC champion and an eight-time All-American. Post-collegiately, Kastor ran under coaches Joe Vigil and Terrence Mahon. Since 2015, she has been coached by her husband, Andrew Kastor, head of the Mammoth Track Club.

Kastor has earned two silver medals (2002 Dublin, long race; 2003 Lausanne, long race) in the IAAF World Cross Country Championships.

She holds U.S. records in the following events:

- Women's road 8K (set at the 2005 The LaSalle Bank Shamrock Shuffle in Chicago with a time of 24:36)

Kastor formerly held the following records:

- Women's marathon (set when winning the 2006 Flora London Marathon with a time of 2:19:36)
- Women's half marathon (set at the 2006 Berlin Half Marathon with a time of 1:07:34)
- Women's road 10 mile (set at the 2006 Berlin Half Marathon with a time of 51:31)
- Women's road 15K (set at the 2003 Gate River Run in Jacksonville with a time of 47:15)
- Women's 10,000 metres (set at Stanford in 2002 with a time of 30:50.32)
- Women's road 5K (set at the 2002 Carlsbad 5000 with a time of 14:54)

In recent years, Kastor has shifted her focus toward the marathon distance. After winning the bronze medal at the 2004 Olympic Marathon, she won the 2005 Chicago Marathon. In 2006, she won the London Marathon, setting an American record until Keira D'Amato broke the record on 16 January 2022 (Houston Marathon) taking 24 second off (2:19:12). She placed sixth at the 2006 New York City Marathon and fifth at the 2007 Boston Marathon. Kastor is a featured subject in the 2007 marathon documentary Spirit of the Marathon, which follows her victory at the 2005 Chicago Marathon.

== 2008 ==
In April 2008, Kastor won the U.S. women's Olympic marathon trials in Boston, Massachusetts. She finished with an unofficial time of 2:29:35, after overtaking competitor Magdalena Lewy Boulet in mile 23. Kastor ran most of the race from behind, while Lewy Boulet built a commanding lead very early on, running alone for most of the marathon. With some 10 miles (16 km) to go, Kastor made a move to catch up to Lewy Boulet, stringing out the field. Lewy Boulet took second place in 2:30:19.

In August 2008, Kastor pulled out of the women's marathon at the Beijing Olympics with a foot injury. At about the 5-kilometer (3.1 mi) mark, she dropped to one knee, holding her right foot. She attempted to rise, but dropped back down again and was forced to withdraw from the race.

== 2010 ==
On March 21, 2010, Kastor competed in the first spring running of the New York City Half Marathon. After running the majority of the race in first, on her way to breaking the course record, she dropped to second place to finish behind Great Britain's Mara Yamauchi.

It was announced in August 2010 that Kastor and her husband were expecting their first child, Piper Bloom, in March 2011. It was also announced that Deena would be making her return to racing at the New York Mini 10K.

== 2012 ==
In January 2012, Deena ran 2:30:40 to place 6th at the Olympic Squad Houston Olympic Trials.

== 2013 ==
In January 2013, Kastor announced she would be running in the 2013 Los Angeles Marathon, to be held on March 17, 2013 where she finished third in 2:32:39.

On August 10, 2013, Kastor placed 9th at the World Championship Marathon in Moscow with a time of 2:36. She stated that it may have been her last high-level marathon.

== 2014 ==
In April 2014, the 41-year-old Kastor won the 2014 More|Fitness Half-Marathon in New York's Central Park in a U.S. masters record of 1:11:38.

On September 21, 2014, she set the world record in the Women's Masters division for the half-marathon, at 1:09:39, while running in the Rock 'n' Roll Half-Marathon in Philadelphia.

== 2015 ==
In October 2015, she broke the U.S. Women's Masters marathon record by almost a minute at the 2015 Chicago Marathon, running 2:27:47.

== 2024 ==
Kastor was on the advisory board of Every Woman's Marathon.

== Awards and rankings ==
Kastor was selected as the top women's marathoner in the world in 2006 by Track and Field News magazine.

Among the honors Kastor has received from the USATF are:

- 2003 Jesse Owens Award as the top female track and field athlete in the US
- USATF Runner of the Year in 2001, 2003, 2004 and 2008
- C.C. Jackson Award in 2002, 2003 and 2004
- USATF Female Cross Country Athlete of the Year in 2001 and 2003, and as a team member in 2002 when the US team finished second at the World Cross Country Championships 8 kilometer run

She was inducted into the New York Jewish Sports Hall of Fame in 2001, and into the National Jewish Sports Hall of Fame on April 29, 2007. In 2003 she was inducted into the Southern California Jewish Sports Hall of Fame.

Year	Event	World rank	US rank
1993	5000 m	–	9th
1997	10,000 m	–	4th
1998	5000 m	–	7th
1999	5000 m	–	2nd
	10,000 m	–	1st
2000	5000 m	–	4th
	3000 m	–	4th
	10,000 m	–	1st
2001	5000 m	–	4th
	3000 m	–	3rd
	Marathon	–	1st
	10,000 m	–	1st
2002	Marathon	–	1st
	5000 m	–	4th
	10,000 m	–	1st
	3,000 m	–	7th
2006	Marathon	1st	1st

== See also ==
- List of select Jewish track and field athletes
