= Athletics at the 2023 Central American and Caribbean Games – Results =

These are the full results of the athletics competition at the 2023 Central American and Caribbean Games which took place between 2 and 8 July 2023 at Estadio Jorge "El Mágico" González in San Salvador, El Salvador.

== Men's results ==
=== 100 metres ===
Heats – 3 July
Wind:
Heat 1: -2.9 m/s, Heat 2: -0.6 m/s, Heat 3: -0.2 m/s

Rank	Heat	Name	Nationality	Time	Notes
1	2	Rikkoi Brathwaite	British Virgin Islands	10.29	Q
2	3	Kion Benjamin	Trinidad and Tobago	10.29	Q
3	3	Cejhae Greene	Antigua and Barbuda	10.31	Q
4	1	José González	Dominican Republic	10.32	Q
5	2	Ronal Longa	Colombia	10.37	Q
6	1	Emanuel Archibald	Guyana	10.37	Q
7	2	Nadale Buntin	Saint Kitts and Nevis	10.38	q
8	3	Cristofer Valdez	Dominican Republic	10.39	q
9	1	Carlos Palacios	Colombia	10.46	
10	1	Eric Harrison Jr.	Trinidad and Tobago	10.46	
11	3	Matthew Clarke	Barbados	10.53	
12	2	Shainer Reginfo	Cuba	10.60	
13	3	Stephan Charles	Saint Lucia	10.64	
14	1	Jevaughn Whyte	Jamaica	10.65	
15	2	Juan Rodríguez	El Salvador	10.77	
16	1	Arturo Deliser	Panama	10.88	
	3	Alonso Edward	Panama	DQ	FS

Final – 3 July

Wind: -2.4 m/s

Rank	Lane	Name	Nationality	Time	Notes
1st place, gold medalist(s)	2	Emanuel Archibald	Guyana	10.24	
2nd place, silver medalist(s)	3	José González	Dominican Republic	10.26	
3rd place, bronze medalist(s)	4	Rikkoi Brathwaite	British Virgin Islands	10.26	
4	5	Cejhae Greene	Antigua and Barbuda	10.43	
5	8	Cristofer Valdez	Dominican Republic	10.45	
6	6	Kion Benjamin	Trinidad and Tobago	10.49	
7	1	Nadale Buntin	Saint Kitts and Nevis	10.54	
8	7	Ronal Longa	Colombia	10.63	

=== 200 metres ===
Heats – 5 July
Wind:
Heat 1: -0.7 m/s, Heat 2: -0.2 m/s, Heat 3: -0.1 m/s

Rank	Heat	Name	Nationality	Time	Notes
1	3	Alexander Ogando	Dominican Republic	20.30	Q
2	2	Carlos Palacios	Colombia	20.52	Q, PB
3	1	Yancarlos Martínez	Dominican Republic	20.61	Q
4	2	Matthew Clarke	Barbados	20.69	Q
5	3	Nadale Buntin	Saint Kitts and Nevis	20.77	Q
6	3	Alonso Edward	Panama	20.80	q
7	2	Carlon Hosten	Trinidad and Tobago	20.81	q
8	1	Shainer Reginfo	Cuba	20.98	Q
9	1	José Figueroa	Puerto Rico	20.99	
10	2	Delan Edwin	Saint Lucia	21.01	
11	1	Warren Hazel	Saint Kitts and Nevis	21.06	
12	3	Kuron Griffith	Barbados	21.06	
13	1	Óscar Baltán	Colombia	21.18	
14	2	Jaleel Croal	British Virgin Islands	21.19	
15	1	Devin Augustine	Trinidad and Tobago	21.19	
16	2	David Vivas	Venezuela	21.21	
17	3	Lenyn Kish Leonce	Saint Lucia	21.44	
18	1	Rafael Vásquez	Venezuela	21.68	
19	2	José Andrés Salazar	El Salvador	21.80	
	3	Darion Skerritt	Antigua and Barbuda	DQ	R17.4

Final – 5 July

Wind: -0.3 m/s

Rank	Lane	Name	Nationality	Time	Notes
1st place, gold medalist(s)	6	Alexander Ogando	Dominican Republic	19.99	
2nd place, silver medalist(s)	7	Carlos Palacios	Colombia	20.37	PB
3rd place, bronze medalist(s)	2	Alonso Edward	Panama	20.46	
4	4	Matthew Clarke	Barbados	20.49	
5	5	Yancarlos Martínez	Dominican Republic	20.54	
6	8	Nadale Buntin	Saint Kitts and Nevis	20.66	
7	1	Carlon Hosten	Trinidad and Tobago	20.86	
8	3	Shainer Reginfo	Cuba	20.97	

=== 400 metres ===
Heats – 4 July

Rank	Heat	Name	Nationality	Time	Notes
1	1	Gilles Biron	Martinique	45.05	Q, PB
2	1	Jonathan Jones	Barbados	45.70	Q
3	1	Gamali Felix	Grenada	45.82	q
4	3	Michael Joseph	Saint Lucia	45.90	Q
5	2	Jereem Richards	Trinidad and Tobago	45.96	Q
6	3	Lidio Andrés Feliz	Dominican Republic	46.13	Q
7	2	Kelvis Padrino	Venezuela	46.19	Q
8	3	Desean Boyce	Barbados	46.29	q
9	1	Robert King	Dominican Republic	46.72	
10	1	Valente Mendoza	Mexico	46.73	
11	3	Leonardo Castillo	Cuba	47.31	
12	2	Desroy Jordan	Saint Vincent and the Grenadines	47.33	
13	3	Zidane Brown	Jamaica	47.35	
14	2	Ohdel James	Trinidad and Tobago	47.51	
15	3	José René Navas	El Salvador	48.95	
16	1	Yoandys Lescay	Cuba	51.38	
	2	Luis Avilés	Mexico	DQ	R17.4

Final – 6 July

Rank	Lane	Name	Nationality	Time	Notes
1st place, gold medalist(s)	5	Jereem Richards	Trinidad and Tobago	44.54	
2nd place, silver medalist(s)	6	Michael Joseph	Saint Lucia	44.90	
3rd place, bronze medalist(s)	7	Gilles Biron	Martinique	45.06	
4	2	Desean Boyce	Barbados	45.32	
5	3	Lidio Andrés Feliz	Dominican Republic	45.40	
6	1	Gamali Felix	Grenada	45.71	
7	8	Kelvis Padrino	Venezuela	45.97	
	4	Jonathan Jones	Barbados	DNF	

=== 800 metres ===
Heats – 4 July

Rank	Heat	Name	Nationality	Time	Notes
1	2	Handal Roban	Saint Vincent and the Grenadines	1:47.43	Q
2	2	Ryan Sánchez	Puerto Rico	1:47.65	Q
3	2	Chamar Chambers	Panama	1:47.81	Q
4	2	Tarees Rhoden	Jamaica	1:48.10	q
5	2	Luis Peralta	Dominican Republic	1:48.14	q
6	2	Ryan López	Venezuela	1:48.75	
7	1	Jesús Tonatiú López	Mexico	1:49.21	Q
8	1	Ferdy Agramonte	Dominican Republic	1:49.29	Q
9	1	José Maita	Venezuela	1:49.32	Q
10	1	Quamel Prince	Guyana	1:49.34	
11	1	Dennick Luke	Dominica	1:49.46	
12	1	Joseph Hernández	El Salvador	1:52.14	PB
13	1	Jhonatan Rodríguez	Colombia	1:56.16	

Final – 5 July

Rank	Name	Nationality	Time	Notes
1st place, gold medalist(s)	Handal Roban	Saint Vincent and the Grenadines	1:45.93	NR
2nd place, silver medalist(s)	Ryan Sánchez	Puerto Rico	1:46.86	
3rd place, bronze medalist(s)	Ferdy Agramonte	Dominican Republic	1:47.46	PB
4	Chamar Chambers	Panama	1:47.72	
5	Luis Peralta	Dominican Republic	1:50.53	
6	Jesús Tonatiú López	Mexico	1:50.71	
7	Tarees Rhoden	Jamaica	1:53.82	
	José Maita	Venezuela	DQ	R17.2.2

=== 1500 metres ===
6 July

Rank	Name	Nationality	Time	Notes
1st place, gold medalist(s)	Fernando Martínez	Mexico	3:43.47	
2nd place, silver medalist(s)	Rob Napolitano	Puerto Rico	3:43.86	
3rd place, bronze medalist(s)	Dage Minors	Bermuda	3:45.12	
4	Timothy Doyle	Puerto Rico	3:45.97	
5	Daísnel Barbán	Cuba	3:45.99	
6	Sebastián López	Venezuela	3:50.51	
7	Hansel Abréu	Cuba	3:50.59	PB
8	Aarón Hernández	El Salvador	3:52.12	NR
9	Lucirio Antonio Garrido	Venezuela	3:54.50	
10	Luis Peralta	Dominican Republic	3:57.66	

=== 5000 metres ===
4 July

Rank	Name	Nationality	Time	Notes
1st place, gold medalist(s)	Héctor Pagán	Puerto Rico	14:07.17	
2nd place, silver medalist(s)	Diego García	Mexico	14:11.12	
3rd place, bronze medalist(s)	Carlos San Martín	Colombia	14:14.08	
4	Mario Pacay	Guatemala	14:15.28	
5	Marvin Blanco	Venezuela	14:19.67	
6	Daniel Johanning	Costa Rica	14:52.33	
	Fernando Martínez	Mexico	DNF	

=== 10,000 metres ===
7 July

Rank	Name	Nationality	Time	Notes
1st place, gold medalist(s)	Víctor Zambrano	Mexico	29:39.30	
2nd place, silver medalist(s)	Iván Darío González	Colombia	29:40.71	
3rd place, bronze medalist(s)	Mario Pacay	Guatemala	29:43.97	
4	Daniel Johanning	Costa Rica	29:49.16	
5	Alberto González	Guatemala	30:02.23	
6	Whinton Palma	Venezuela	30:29.19	PB
7	Francisco Estévez	Cuba	30:31.63	
8	Amauri Rodríguez	Dominican Republic	31:19.58	
9	Arnaldo Martínez	Puerto Rico	31:49.63	
	Dairan Suárez	Cuba	DNF	

=== Half marathon ===
2 July

Rank	Name	Nationality	Time	Notes
1st place, gold medalist(s)	Alberto González	Guatemala	1:03:50	GR
2nd place, silver medalist(s)	José González	Colombia	1:04:23	
3rd place, bronze medalist(s)	Juan Luis Barrios	Mexico	1:05:13	
4	Jeison Suárez	Colombia	1:05:52	
5	Álvaro Abreu	Dominican Republic	1:06:19	
6	Óscar Aldana	El Salvador	1:07:54	
7	Arnaldo Martínez	Puerto Rico	1:10:28	
	Luis Orta	Venezuela	DNF	

=== 110 metres hurdles ===
Heats – 4 July
Wind:
Heat 1: -0.4 m/s, Heat 2: -0.6 m/s

Rank	Heat	Name	Nationality	Time	Notes
1	2	Rasheem Brown	Cayman Islands	13.69	Q
2	2	Jeanice Laviolette	Guadeloupe	13.73	Q
3	1	Shane Brathwaite	Barbados	13.75	Q
4	1	Matthew Sophia	Curaçao	13.83	Q
5	1	Georni Jaramillo	Venezuela	14.11	Q
6	1	Wienstan Mena	Guatemala	14.21	q
7	2	Yovany Canuet	Cuba	14.24	Q
8	2	Eddie Lovett	United States Virgin Islands	14.26	q
	1	Odario Phillips	Jamaica	DQ	R22.6.2
	2	Giano Roberts	Jamaica	DQ	R22.6.2

Final – 5 July

Wind: -0.4 m/s

Rank	Lane	Name	Nationality	Time	Notes
1st place, gold medalist(s)	3	Shane Brathwaite	Barbados	13.64	
2nd place, silver medalist(s)	4	Rasheem Brown	Cayman Islands	13.64	
3rd place, bronze medalist(s)	6	Jeanice Laviolette	Guadeloupe	13.82	
4	5	Matthew Sophia	Curaçao	13.85	
5	7	Yovany Canuet	Cuba	14.21	
6	1	Eddie Lovett	United States Virgin Islands	14.28	
7	2	Georni Jaramillo	Venezuela	14.35	
8	8	Wienstan Mena	Guatemala	14.38	

=== 400 metres hurdles ===
Heats – 3 July

Rank	Heat	Name	Nationality	Time	Notes
1	2	Pablo Andrés Ibáñez	El Salvador	49.32	Q
2	2	Guillermo Campos	Mexico	49.67	Q, PB
3	2	Juander Santos	Dominican Republic	49.67	Q
4	1	Yeral Nuñez	Dominican Republic	50.13	Q
5	1	Gerald Drummond	Costa Rica	50.20	Q
6	2	Rasheeme Griffith	Barbados	50.42	q
7	1	Yoao Illas	Cuba	50.45	Q
8	1	Troy Whyte	Jamaica	50.52	q
9	1	Rivaldo Leacock	Barbados	51.31	
10	2	José Luis Gaspar	Cuba	51.73	

Final – 4 July

Rank	Lane	Name	Nationality	Time	Notes
1st place, gold medalist(s)	7	Pablo Andrés Ibáñez	El Salvador	49.34	
2nd place, silver medalist(s)	4	Guillermo Campos	Mexico	49.55	PB
3rd place, bronze medalist(s)	5	Juander Santos	Dominican Republic	49.61	
4	3	Gerald Drummond	Costa Rica	49.62	
5	1	Rasheeme Griffith	Barbados	49.76	
6	2	Troy Whyte	Jamaica	49.82	
7	6	Yeral Nuñez	Dominican Republic	49.88	
8	8	Yoao Illas	Cuba	50.00	PB

=== 3000 metres steeplechase ===
7 July

Rank	Name	Nationality	Time	Notes
1st place, gold medalist(s)	Carlos San Martín	Colombia	8:50.15	
2nd place, silver medalist(s)	César Gómez	Mexico	8:50.68	
3rd place, bronze medalist(s)	Carlos Santos	El Salvador	8:51.92	
4	Diddier Rodríguez	Panama	8:55.16	
5	Ricardo Estremera	Puerto Rico	9:04.08	
6	Mario López	Mexico	9:16.16	
	José Peña	Venezuela	DNF	

=== 4 × 100 metres relay ===
6 July

Rank	Lane	Nation	Competitors	Time	Notes
1st place, gold medalist(s)	5	Trinidad and Tobago	Carlon Hosten, Kion Benjamin, Eric Harrison Jr., Devin Augustine	38.30	
2nd place, silver medalist(s)	6	Dominican Republic	Cristofer Valdez, José González, Erick Sánchez, Yancarlos Martínez	38.61	
3rd place, bronze medalist(s)	7	Venezuela	David Vivas, Rafael Vásquez, Alexis Nieves, Bryant Alamo	39.13	
4	8	Colombia	Jhonny Rentería, Óscar Baltán, Neiker Abello, Ronal Longa	39.45	
5	3	Guyana	Emanuel Archibald, Noelex Holder, Akeen Stewart, Ezekiel Newton	39.66	
6	4	El Salvador	Juan Rodríguez, Esteban Ibáñez, Samuel Ibáñez, Pablo Andrés Ibáñez	41.29	

=== 4 × 400 metres relay ===
7 July

Rank	Lane	Nation	Competitors	Time	Notes
1st place, gold medalist(s)	5	Trinidad and Tobago	Rennie Quow, Che Lara, Machel Cedenio, Jereem Richards	3:01.99	
2nd place, silver medalist(s)	6	Barbados	Kyle Gale, Rasheeme Griffith, Rivaldo Leacock, Desean Boyce	3:02.12	
3rd place, bronze medalist(s)	8	Dominican Republic	Ezequiel Suárez, Juander Santos, Robert King, Lidio Andrés Feliz	3:02.19	
4	7	Venezuela	Javier Gómez, Julio Rodríguez, José Maita, Kelvis Padrino	3:03.00	
5	4	Colombia	Jhonatan Rodríguez, Óscar Baltán, Gustavo Barrios, Raúl Mena	3:10.17	
6	3	El Salvador	Joseph Hernández, Samuel Ibáñez, Esteban Ibáñez, Pablo Andrés Ibáñez	3:11.71	

=== 20 kilometres walk ===
2 July

Rank	Name	Nationality	Time	Penalties	Notes
1st place, gold medalist(s)	José Luis Doctor	Mexico	1:22:35	>	
2nd place, silver medalist(s)	César Herrera	Colombia	1:22:37	>>	
3rd place, bronze medalist(s)	Noel Ali Chama	Mexico	1:23:09	>	
4	Manuel Esteban Soto	Colombia	1:25:28	~	
5	Yassir Cabrera	Panama	1:27:07	~~	
6	Juan Manuel Calderón	Costa Rica	1:31:40	>	
7	Ronaldo Hernández	Cuba	1:34:14	>>>>	
	José Alejandro Barrondo	Guatemala	DQ	>>>>~	
	José Ortiz	Guatemala	DNF	>	

=== High jump ===
3 July

Rank	Name	Nationality	1.86	1.93	2.00	2.07	2.12	2.17	2.22	2.25	2.28	Result	Notes
1st place, gold medalist(s)	Luis Castro	Puerto Rico	–	–	–	o	o	o	xo	xo	xxx	2.25	
2nd place, silver medalist(s)	Luis Zayas	Cuba	–	–	–	–	o	o	o	xxo	xxx	2.25	
3rd place, bronze medalist(s)	Shaun Miller Jr.	Bahamas	–	–	–	o	o	xo	o	xxx		2.22	
4	Edgar Rivera	Mexico	–	–	–	o	o	o	xxo	xxx		2.22	
5	Erick Portillo	Mexico	–	–	–	–	o	xo	xxo	xxx		2.22	
6	Raymond Richards	Jamaica	–	–	o	o	o	o	xxx			2.17	
7	Kyle Alcime	Bahamas	–	–	o	o	o	xxx				2.12	
8	Marcus Gelpi	Puerto Rico	–	–	o	o	xxx					2.07	
9	Micky Ferdinand	Saint Lucia	–	–	o	x–	xx					2.00	
10	Diego José Reyes	El Salvador	xo	xxo	xxx							1.93	

=== Pole vault ===
6 July

Rank	Name	Nationality	4.45	4.60	4.75	4.90	5.05	5.20	5.30	5.40	5.61	Result	Notes
1st place, gold medalist(s)	Jorge Luna	Mexico	–	–	–	–	o	o	o	xo	xxx	5.40	
2nd place, silver medalist(s)	Víctor Castillero	Mexico	–	–	–	–	o	xo	o	xxx		5.30	
3rd place, bronze medalist(s)	José Tomás Nieto	Colombia	–	–	–	–	–	xxo	xxo	xxx		5.30	
4	Eduardo Nápoles	Cuba	–	–	–	–	–	o	–	xxx		5.20	
4	Ricardo Montes de Oca	Venezuela	–	–	–	–	–	o	xxx			5.20	
6	Andy Hernández	Cuba	–	–	–	–	o	xxx				5.05	
7	Yariel Soto	Puerto Rico	–	–	o	xo	xxo	xxx				5.05	
8	Jorge Montes	Dominican Republic	–	–	xxo	o	xxx					4.90	
9	Daniel Machado	El Salvador	xo	o	xo	xxx						4.75	
10	Christiaan Higueros	Guatemala	xo	xxx								4.45	
	Ernesto Collazo	Puerto Rico	–	–	xxx							NM	

=== Long jump ===
4 July

Rank	Name	Nationality	#1	#2	#3	#4	#5	#6	Result	Notes
1st place, gold medalist(s)	Alejandro Parada	Cuba	x	7.70	7.68	7.51	7.88	–	7.88	
2nd place, silver medalist(s)	Jordan Turner	Jamaica	7.65	x	x	7.60	x	x	7.65	
3rd place, bronze medalist(s)	Tristan James	Dominica	7.23	7.65	x	7.35	x	7.42	7.65	
4	Nicolás Arriola	Guatemala	7.23	7.30	6.93	x	7.24	7.26	7.30	
5	Ifeanyi Otuonye	Turks and Caicos Islands	7.02	6.97	7.21	7.10	x	x	7.21	
6	Andwuelle Wright	Trinidad and Tobago	6.57	x	x	x	6.66	–	6.66	
	Maykel Massó	Cuba	x	r					NM	
	Emanuel Archibald	Guyana							NM	

=== Triple jump ===
7 July

Rank	Name	Nationality	#1	#2	#3	#4	#5	#6	Result	Notes
1st place, gold medalist(s)	Lázaro Martínez	Cuba	x	16.97	x	16.72	17.51	–	17.51	PB
2nd place, silver medalist(s)	Cristian Nápoles	Cuba	17.11	x	13.91	x	16.68	x	17.11	
3rd place, bronze medalist(s)	Leodan Torrealba	Venezuela	15.93	x	16.41	x	x	15.86	16.41	
4	Kelsey Daniel	Trinidad and Tobago	15.76	15.91	x	x	16.10	16.10	16.10	
5	Juander Bueno	Dominican Republic	15.90w	x	x	15.73	16.10	x	16.10	
6	Domon Williams	Guyana	x	15.43	15.83	15.63	15.80	16.04	16.04	
7	Jah-Nhai Perinchief	Bermuda	x	15.44	x	x	x	15.66	15.66	
8	Fernando Reyes	El Salvador	14.75	14.75	x	x	x	14.16	14.75	

=== Shot put ===
3 July

Rank	Name	Nationality	#1	#2	#3	#4	#5	#6	Result	Notes
1st place, gold medalist(s)	Uziel Muñoz	Mexico	20.61	20.36	20.81	20.15	20.36	x	20.81	
2nd place, silver medalist(s)	Jairo Morán	Mexico	16.17	18.09	18.06	18.54	19.18	x	19.18	
3rd place, bronze medalist(s)	Djimon Gumbs	British Virgin Islands	17.70	x	19.00	x	x	18.83	19.00	
4	John Fredy Zea	Colombia	17.76	17.70	18.64	17.82	x	x	18.64	
5	Hezekiel Romeo	Trinidad and Tobago	18.36	18.34	x	17.97	18.42	18.03	18.42	
6	Eldred Henry	British Virgin Islands	16.73	x	18.12	x	x	x	18.12	
7	Zack Short	Honduras	18.03	x	x	18.08	18.04	x	18.08	
8	Juan Carley Vázquez	Cuba	17.88	x	17.75	16.85	17.97	x	17.97	
	Akeem Stewart	Trinidad and Tobago							DNS	

=== Discus throw ===
5 July

Rank	Name	Nationality	#1	#2	#3	#4	#5	#6	Result	Notes
1st place, gold medalist(s)	Mario Díaz	Cuba	58.71	60.82	62.57	61.33	60.13	61.77	62.57	
2nd place, silver medalist(s)	Mauricio Ortega	Colombia	59.42	61.20	61.67	x	59.93	x	61.67	
3rd place, bronze medalist(s)	Jorge Fernández	Cuba	55.16	59.18	x	59.39	59.97	x	59.97	
4	Christopher Crawford	Trinidad and Tobago	54.97	58.66	x	x	x	57.03	58.66	
5	Uziel Muñoz	Mexico	54.97	58.66	x	x	x	57.03	55.22	
6	Djimon Gumbs	British Virgin Islands	53.55	55.22	50.41	x	51.50	x	54.00	
7	Diamante Gumbs	British Virgin Islands	50.71	50.77	52.48	x	x	x	52.48	
8	Jaden James	Trinidad and Tobago	49.90	x	x	x	x	49.22	49.90	

=== Hammer throw ===
5 July

Rank	Name	Nationality	#1	#2	#3	#4	#5	#6	Result	Notes
1st place, gold medalist(s)	Jerome Vega	Puerto Rico	70.68	72.06	73.93	72.25	74.83	72.15	74.83	NR
2nd place, silver medalist(s)	Diego del Real	Mexico	69.12	70.92	73.25	73.58	74.07	74.57	74.57	
3rd place, bronze medalist(s)	Miguel Zamora	Cuba	68.87	69.85	71.83	72.63	x	72.41	72.63	
4	Ronald Mencía	Cuba	68.10	69.03	70.44	x	70.99	71.32	71.32	
5	José Manuel Padilla	Mexico	65.70	68.60	x	62.87	68.75	68.88	68.88	
6	Daniel Cope	Jamaica	61.00	63.14	x	64.26	60.62	62.77	64.26	
7	Carlos Arteaga	Nicaragua	55.74	x	60.85	60.60	61.25	58.53	61.25	NR
8	Dylan Suárez	Costa Rica	56.87	58.27	56.27	x	–	–	58.27	
9	David Ayala	El Salvador	56.83	56.64	x				56.83	

=== Javelin throw ===
6 July

Rank	Name	Nationality	#1	#2	#3	#4	#5	#6	Result	Notes
1st place, gold medalist(s)	Keshorn Walcott	Trinidad and Tobago	77.68	83.60	x	76.90	x	–	83.60	
2nd place, silver medalist(s)	David Carreon	Mexico	75.43	74.63	78.03	x	73.36	75.15	78.03	
3rd place, bronze medalist(s)	Elvis Graham	Jamaica	76.43	70.62	x	73.22	72.90	73.31	76.43	
4	Leslain Baird	Guyana	75.35	72.87	71.83	x	75.86	73.13	75.86	
5	Billy Julio	Colombia	64.50	70.12	68.86	74.20	68.80	72.28	74.20	
6	Carlos Armenta	Mexico	70.70	73.95	72.01	73.97	72.45	x	73.97	
7	Iván José Sibaja	Costa Rica	65.37	64.63	67.02	69.24	72.42	x	72.42	
8	Albert Reynolds	Saint Lucia	72.10	69.25	70.35	x	72.17	67.16	72.17	

=== Decathlon ===
3–4 July

The highest mark recorded in each event is highlighted in yellow

Rank	Athlete	Nationality	100m	LJ	SP	HJ	400m	110m H	DT	PV	JT	1500m	Points	Notes
1st place, gold medalist(s)	Ayden Owens-Delerme	Puerto Rico	10.36	7.54	13.88	2.01	47.19	13.85	43.40	4.60	56.62	4:46.57	8281	
2nd place, silver medalist(s)	Ken Mullings	Bahamas	10.69	7.06	14.74	2.13	49.26	14.06	44.63	4.60	55.92	4:59.92	8060	PB
3rd place, bronze medalist(s)	Yariel Soto	Puerto Rico	10.85	7.11	12.29	1.98	48.40	14.89	43.37	4.70	47.11	4:26.50	7762	
4	José Miguel Paulino	Dominican Republic	11.05	7.43	12.89	2.01	49.09	14.99	38.43	4.50	54.46	4:27.04	7762	NR
5	Yan Hernández	Cuba	10.50	7.41	13.05	1.95	49.60	14.63	40.76	4.80	53.34	5:21.43	7654	
6	Gerson Izaguirre	Venezuela	11.02	7.17	13.67	1.92	49.86	14.10	41.84	4.60	52.54	5:02.38	7596	
7	Esteban Ibáñez	El Salvador	11.10	7.19	10.95	1.98	48.74	14.71	33.42	4.00	49.40	4:36.25	7217	

== Women's results ==
=== 100 metres ===
Heats – 3 July
Wind:
Heat 1: -1.6 m/s, Heat 2: -1.4 m/s, Heat 3: -2.2 m/s

Rank	Heat	Name	Nationality	Time	Notes
1	1	Julien Alfred	Saint Lucia	11.24	Q
2	3	Leah Bertrand	Trinidad and Tobago	11.44	Q
3	1	Cecilia Tamayo	Mexico	11.44	Q
4	2	Yanique Dayle	Jamaica	11.46	Q
5	1	Orangy Jiménez	Venezuela	11.55	q
6	1	Akilah Lewis	Trinidad and Tobago	11.57	q
7	3	Yunisleidy García	Cuba	11.57	Q
8	2	Liranyi Alonso	Dominican Republic	11.58	Q
9	1	Martha Méndez	Dominican Republic	11.82	
10	2	Keliza Smith	Guyana	11.67	
11	2	Anthaya Charlton	Guyana	11.68	
12	3	Tristan Evelyn	Barbados	11.71	
13	3	Beyonce De Freitas	British Virgin Islands	11.84	
14	2	Yarima García	Cuba	11.96	
15	2	Selena Arjona	Panama	11.97	
16	3	María Alejandra Carmona	Nicaragua	12.99	
	3	Mariandre Chacón	Guatemala	DQ	FS

Final – 3 July

Wind: -2.2 m/s

Rank	Lane	Name	Nationality	Time	Notes
1st place, gold medalist(s)	6	Julien Alfred	Saint Lucia	11.14	
2nd place, silver medalist(s)	5	Yanique Dayle	Jamaica	11.39	
3rd place, bronze medalist(s)	7	Yunisleidy García	Cuba	11.50	
4	4	Cecilia Tamayo	Mexico	11.54	
5	1	Orangy Jiménez	Venezuela	11.55	
6	3	Leah Bertrand	Trinidad and Tobago	11.57	
7	2	Liranyi Alonso	Dominican Republic	11.58	
8	8	Akilah Lewis	Trinidad and Tobago	11.64	

=== 200 metres ===
Heats – 5 July
Wind:
Heat 1: -1.9 m/s, Heat 2: -0.4 m/s, Heat 3: -0.9 m/s

Rank	Heat	Name	Nationality	Time	Notes
1	2	Fiordaliza Cofil	Dominican Republic	23.21	Q
2	2	Beyonce De Freitas	British Virgin Islands	23.26	Q
3	3	Yanique Dayle	Jamaica	23.31	Q
4	1	Orangy Jiménez	Venezuela	23.33	Q
5	1	Cecilia Tamayo	Mexico	23.40	Q
6	2	Enis Pérez	Cuba	23.50	q
7	3	Yunisleidy García	Cuba	23.59	Q
8	3	Lina Licona	Colombia	23.70	q
9	2	Cristal Cuervo	Panama	23.83	
10	1	Sole Frederick	Trinidad and Tobago	23.83	
11	2	Sanaa Frederick	Trinidad and Tobago	23.87	
12	2	Kenisha Phillips	Guyana	23.98	
13	1	Melany Bolaño	Colombia	24.02	
14	3	Deshanya Skeete	Guyana	24.13	
15	3	Selena Arjona	Panama	24.38	
16	3	Mariandre Chacón	Guatemala	24.50	
17	1	Martha Méndez	Dominican Republic	24.57	

Final – 5 July

Wind: -0.7 m/s

Rank	Lane	Name	Nationality	Time	Notes
1st place, gold medalist(s)	7	Yanique Dayle	Jamaica	22.80	
2nd place, silver medalist(s)	8	Yunisleidy García	Cuba	23.05	
3rd place, bronze medalist(s)	5	Fiordaliza Cofil	Dominican Republic	23.07	SB
4	6	Orangy Jiménez	Venezuela	23.11	
5	4	Cecilia Tamayo	Mexico	23.18	
6	3	Beyonce De Freitas	British Virgin Islands	23.34	
7	1	Enis Pérez	Cuba	23.64	
8	2	Lina Licona	Colombia	23.69	

=== 400 metres ===
Heats – 4 July

Rank	Heat	Name	Nationality	Time	Notes
1	2	Marileidy Paulino	Dominican Republic	51.25	Q
2	1	Paola Morán	Mexico	51.36	Q
3	1	Roxana Gómez	Cuba	51.36	Q
4	2	Gabby Scott	Puerto Rico	51.44	Q
5	1	Fiordaliza Cofil	Dominican Republic	51.47	Q
6	2	Evelis Aguilar	Colombia	51.76	Q
7	2	Lisneidy Veitía	Cuba	53.11	q
8	1	Kenisha Phillips	Guyana	53.31	q
9	2	Deshanya Skeete	Guyana	53.39	
10	1	Tracy Joseph	Costa Rica	54.62	
11	2	Desiré Bermúdez	Costa Rica	55.06	
12	1	Shalysa Wray	Cayman Islands	55.68	
13	1	Caitlyn Bobb	Bermuda	55.73	

Final – 6 July

Rank	Lane	Name	Nationality	Time	Notes
1st place, gold medalist(s)	4	Marileidy Paulino	Dominican Republic	49.95	GR
2nd place, silver medalist(s)	7	Roxana Gómez	Cuba	51.23	
3rd place, bronze medalist(s)	6	Gabby Scott	Puerto Rico	51.51	
4	3	Evelis Aguilar	Colombia	51.67	
5	5	Paola Morán	Mexico	51.93	
6	2	Lisneidy Veitía	Cuba	53.52	
7	1	Kenisha Phillips	Guyana	54.06	
	8	Fiordaliza Cofil	Dominican Republic	DQ	FS

=== 800 metres ===
Heats – 4 July

Rank	Heat	Name	Nationality	Time	Notes
1	1	Rose Mary Almanza	Cuba	2:03.25	Q
2	2	Sahily Diago	Cuba	2:04.64	Q
3	1	Sonia Gaskin	Barbados	2:05.03	Q
4	1	Aziza Ayoub	Puerto Rico	2:05.34	Q
5	2	Shafiqua Maloney	Saint Vincent and the Grenadines	2:05.42	Q
6	2	Aliyah Moore	Guyana	2:06.63	Q
7	2	DeAnna Martin	Dominican Republic	2:07.98	q
8	1	María Tirado	Venezuela	2:10.11	q
9	2	María Rojas	Venezuela	2:11.01	
10	1	Lilian Reyes	Dominican Republic	2:11.26	
11	2	Mikaela Smith	United States Virgin Islands	2:17.97	
12	1	Angeline Pondler	Costa Rica	2:19.59	
13	1	Yency Chamur	El Salvador	2:25.23	

Final – 5 July

Rank	Name	Nationality	Time	Notes
1st place, gold medalist(s)	Rose Mary Almanza	Cuba	2:01.75	
2nd place, silver medalist(s)	Sahily Diago	Cuba	2:02.81	
3rd place, bronze medalist(s)	Shafiqua Maloney	Saint Vincent and the Grenadines	2:04.98	
4	Sonia Gaskin	Barbados	2:05.50	
5	Aziza Ayoub	Puerto Rico	2:05.95	
6	DeAnna Martin	Dominican Republic	2:07.62	
7	María Tirado	Venezuela	2:13.92	
	Aliyah Moore	Guyana	DQ	R17.3.1

=== 1500 metres ===
6 July

Rank	Name	Nationality	Time	Notes
1st place, gold medalist(s)	Joselyn Brea	Venezuela	4:10.39	
2nd place, silver medalist(s)	Sahily Diago	Cuba	4:11.07	PB
3rd place, bronze medalist(s)	Daily Cooper	Cuba	4:11.25	PB
4	Alma Cortes	Mexico	4:15.19	
5	Angelín Figueroa	Puerto Rico	4:24.86	
6	María Garrido	Venezuela	4:35.51	
7	Rachel Conhoff	United States Virgin Islands	4:42.99	
8	Suyeris Guerra	Panama	4:43.81	

=== 5000 metres ===
3 July

Rank	Name	Nationality	Time	Notes
1st place, gold medalist(s)	Joselyn Brea	Venezuela	15:10.60	
2nd place, silver medalist(s)	Laura Galván	Mexico	15:12.61	
3rd place, bronze medalist(s)	Alma Cortes	Mexico	15:59.21	
4	Viviana Aroche	Guatemala	16:00.21	
5	Anisleidis Ochoa	Cuba	16:02.50	PB
6	Edymar Brea	Venezuela	16:03.94	
7	Muriel Coneo	Colombia	16:13.54	
8	Palmenia Agudelo	Colombia	17:03.43	

=== 10,000 metres ===
6 July

Rank	Name	Nationality	Time	Notes
1st place, gold medalist(s)	Laura Galván	Mexico	33:12.28	
2nd place, silver medalist(s)	Viviana Aroche	Guatemala	33:38.44	
3rd place, bronze medalist(s)	Citlali Moscote	Mexico	33:40.43	
4	Anisleidis Ochoa	Cuba	34:13.61	PB
5	Muriel Coneo	Colombia	34:40.20	
6	Soranyi Rodríguez	Dominican Republic	35:19.37	
7	Palmenia Agudelo	Colombia	35:39.49	
8	Paola Ramos	Puerto Rico	38:02.64	
9	Yumileydis Mestre	Cuba	38:07.06	

=== Half marathon ===
2 July

Rank	Name	Nationality	Time	Notes
1st place, gold medalist(s)	Joselyn Brea	Venezuela	1:15:04	
2nd place, silver medalist(s)	Margarita Hernández	Mexico	1:15:10	
3rd place, bronze medalist(s)	Angie Orjuela	Colombia	1:15:19	
4	Isabel Oropeza	Mexico	1:15:35	
5	Beverly Ramos	Puerto Rico	1:19:17	
6	María Fernanda Montoya	Colombia	1:21:05	
7	Cécilia Mobuchon	Martinique	1:21:11	
8	Paola Ramos	Puerto Rico	1:24:47	
9	Idelma Delgado	El Salvador	1:25:52	
	Diana Bogantes	Costa Rica	DNF	

=== 100 metres hurdles ===
Heats – 4 July
Wind:
Heat 1: 0.0 m/s, Heat 2: +0.3 m/s

Rank	Heat	Name	Nationality	Time	Notes
1	1	Jasmine Camacho-Quinn	Puerto Rico	12.60	Q
2	1	Andrea Vargas	Costa Rica	12.91	Q
3	2	Greisys Roble	Cuba	13.02	Q
4	2	Paola Vázquez	Puerto Rico	13.22	Q
5	1	Dalhiana Rouvillon	Guadeloupe	13.52	Q
6	1	Keily Pérez	Cuba	13.58	q
7	2	Nancy Sandoval	El Salvador	13.62	Q, NR
8	1	Deya Erickson	British Virgin Islands	13.92	q
9	2	Mariani Otaño	Dominican Republic	13.98	
	2	Mariel Brokke	Costa Rica	DQ	R22.6.2

Final – 5 July

Wind: -0.2 m/s

Rank	Lane	Name	Nationality	Time	Notes
1st place, gold medalist(s)	3	Jasmine Camacho-Quinn	Puerto Rico	12.61	
2nd place, silver medalist(s)	4	Greisys Roble	Cuba	12.94	
3rd place, bronze medalist(s)	5	Andrea Vargas	Costa Rica	13.02	
4	6	Paola Vázquez	Puerto Rico	13.40	
5	2	Dalhiana Rouvillon	Guadeloupe	13.52	
6	1	Keily Pérez	Cuba	13.64	
7	7	Nancy Sandoval	El Salvador	13.74	
8	8	Deya Erickson	British Virgin Islands	14.11	

=== 400 metres hurdles ===
Heats – 3 July

Rank	Heat	Name	Nationality	Time	Notes
1	1	Gianna Woodruff	Panama	55.49	Q
2	2	Zurian Hechavarría	Cuba	55.74	Q
3	2	Daniela Rojas	Costa Rica	56.44	Q
4	1	Michelle Smith	United States Virgin Islands	57.03	Q
5	2	Tia Adana Belle	Barbados	57.14	Q
6	1	Valeria Cabezas	Colombia	57.58	Q
7	2	Yanique Haye-Smith	Turks and Caicos Islands	57.83	q
8	1	Darielys Sentelle	Cuba	57.91	q
9	1	Andrea Foster	Guyana	59.37	
10	2	Evelyn Del Carmen	Dominican Republic	59.59	

Final – 4 July

Rank	Lane	Name	Nationality	Time	Notes
1st place, gold medalist(s)	6	Zurian Hechavarría	Cuba	55.52	
2nd place, silver medalist(s)	4	Gianna Woodruff	Panama	56.15	
3rd place, bronze medalist(s)	5	Daniela Rojas	Costa Rica	56.58	
4	3	Tia Adana Belle	Barbados	56.82	
5	7	Michelle Smith	United States Virgin Islands	57.43	
6	1	Yanique Haye-Smith	Turks and Caicos Islands	57.59	
7	8	Valeria Cabezas	Colombia	58.05	
8	2	Darielys Sentelle	Cuba	59.01	

=== 3000 metres steeplechase ===
7 July

Rank	Name	Nationality	Time	Notes
1st place, gold medalist(s)	Alondra Negrón	Puerto Rico	10:14.34	
2nd place, silver medalist(s)	Arian Chia	Mexico	10:24.04	
3rd place, bronze medalist(s)	Stefany López	Colombia	10:27.20	
4	Milena Pérez	Cuba	10:27.92	
5	Marian López	Cuba	11:01.74	
6	María Tirado	Venezuela	11:15.58	

=== 4 × 100 metres relay ===
6 July

Rank	Lane	Nation	Competitors	Time	Notes
1st place, gold medalist(s)	4	Cuba	Laura Moreira, Enis Pérez, Yarima García, Yunisleidy García	43.17	
2nd place, silver medalist(s)	8	Trinidad and Tobago	Sanaa Frederick, Akilah Lewis, Reyare Thomas, Leah Bertrand	43.43	NU20R
3rd place, bronze medalist(s)	6	Dominican Republic	Liranyi Alonso, Marileidy Paulino, Anabel Medina, Darianny Jiménez	43.45	
4	7	El Salvador	Rebeca Barrientos, Yency Chamur, Nathalie Almendarez, Nancy Sandoval	48.81	
	5	Colombia	Marlet Ospino, Lina Licona, Melany Bolaño, Angélica Gamboa	DQ	R17.3.1

=== 4 × 400 metres relay ===
7 July

Rank	Lane	Nation	Competitors	Time	Notes
1st place, gold medalist(s)	5	Cuba	Zurian Hechavarría, Rose Mary Almanza, Lisneidy Veitía, Roxana Gómez	3:26.08	GR
2nd place, silver medalist(s)	6	Dominican Republic	Mariana Pérez, Anabel Medina, Franchina Martínez, Marileidy Paulino	3:27.84	NR
3rd place, bronze medalist(s)	8	Colombia	Lina Licona, Melany Bolaño, Valeria Cabezas, Evelis Aguilar	3:31.16	SB
4	4	Costa Rica	Daniela Rojas, Mariel Brokke, Angeline Pondler, Desiré Bermúdez	3:40.10	
5	7	Venezuela	María Rojas, María Garrido, María Tirado, Wilismar Padrón	3:55.90	

=== 20 kilometres walk ===
2 July

Rank	Name	Nationality	Time	Penalties	Notes
1st place, gold medalist(s)	Alejandra Ortega	Mexico	1:35:43	>	
2nd place, silver medalist(s)	María Fernanda Peinado	Guatemala	1:35:59	>>~	
3rd place, bronze medalist(s)	Maritza Poncio	Guatemala	1:36:25		
4	Rachelle De Orbeta	Puerto Rico	1:37:08		
5	Valeria Ortuño	Mexico	1:38:47	~~	
6	Laura Chalarca	Colombia	1:41:30	>~	
7	Milangela Rosales	Venezuela	1:45:49		
8	Natalia Alfonzo	Venezuela	1:46:13	~~~	
	Noelia Vargas	Costa Rica	DNF	~~	

=== High jump ===
7 July

Rank	Name	Nationality	1.65	1.70	1.75	1.78	1.81	1.84	1.86	1.88	Result	Notes
1st place, gold medalist(s)	Marysabel Senyu	Dominican Republic	–	–	o	xo	xxo	xo	xxo	xxx	1.86	
2nd place, silver medalist(s)	Glenka Antonia	Curaçao	–	o	o	xo	xo	o	xxx		1.84	
3rd place, bronze medalist(s)	Dacsy Brisón	Cuba	–	o	o	o	o	xxx			1.81	
3rd place, bronze medalist(s)	Marys Patterson	Cuba	–	o	o	o	o	xxx			1.81	
5	Ariana Gutiérrez	Venezuela	–	o	xo	xxx					1.75	
6	Abigail Obando	Costa Rica	xo	xo	xxo	xxx					1.75	
7	Yashira Rhymer-Stuart	United States Virgin Islands	xo	xxx							1.65	
7	Ornelis Ortiz	Venezuela	xo	xxx							1.65	

=== Pole vault ===
7 July

Rank	Name	Nationality	3.15	3.30	3.45	3.60	3.75	3.90	4.00	4.10	4.20	4.30	4.40	4.55	4.60	4.71	Result	Notes
1st place, gold medalist(s)	Robeilys Peinado	Venezuela	–	–	–	–	–	–	o	–	o	o	o	o	xo	xxx	4.60	
2nd place, silver medalist(s)	Aslín Quiala	Cuba	–	–	–	–	–	–	o	o	xxo	o	xxx				4.30	
2nd place, silver medalist(s)	Katherine Castillo	Colombia	–	–	–	–	–	–	o	–	xxo	o	xxx				4.30	=NR
4	Diamara Planell	Puerto Rico	–	–	–	–	–	–	o	o	xxx						4.10	
5	Andrea Velasco	El Salvador	–	–	–	o	o	xxo	xxx								3.90	
6	Rosaidi Robles	Cuba	–	–	–	–	xxo	xxo	xxx								3.90	
7	Vielka Arias	Costa Rica	–	o	o	xo	xo	xxx									3.75	NR
8	Andrea Machuca	El Salvador	o	o	xo	xo	xxx										3.60	
9	Sharik Fontecha	Venezuela	–	xxo	xxx												3.30	
	Viviana Quintana	Puerto Rico	–	–	–	–	–	xx–	x								NM	

=== Long jump ===
3 July

Rank	Name	Nationality	#1	#2	#3	#4	#5	#6	Result	Notes
1st place, gold medalist(s)	Natalia Linares	Colombia	6.86	6.34	6.50	6.35	–	6.54	6.86	GR, AU23R
2nd place, silver medalist(s)	Leyanis Pérez	Cuba	6.09	6.51	6.64	6.48	6.65w	x	6.65w	
3rd place, bronze medalist(s)	Alysbeth Félix	Puerto Rico	x	x	6.44	6.10	6.41	x	6.44	
4	Paola Fernández	Puerto Rico	6.05	x	6.06	6.20	6.22	6.39w	6.39w	
5	Adriana Rodríguez	Cuba	x	6.34	6.38	6.14	6.32	6.35w	6.38	
6	Tyra Gittens	Trinidad and Tobago	6.19	6.13	x	5.68	6.13	5.58w	6.19	
7	Susana Hernández	Mexico	x	5.96	x	5.89	x	x	5.96	
8	Rebeca Barrientos	El Salvador	5.60	x	5.70	5.62	5.47	5.52	5.70	PB

=== Triple jump ===
5 July

Rank	Name	Nationality	#1	#2	#3	#4	#5	#6	Result	Notes
1st place, gold medalist(s)	Yulimar Rojas	Venezuela	15.16	x	x	x	15.02	x	15.16	WL
2nd place, silver medalist(s)	Leyanis Pérez	Cuba	14.75	14.94	x	14.75	14.98	14.79	14.98	PB
3rd place, bronze medalist(s)	Liadagmis Povea	Cuba	14.51	14.67	14.85	14.34	14.35	14.82	14.85	
4	Thea LaFond	Dominica	14.18	14.07	x	13.98	14.22	14.42	14.42	
5	Mairy Pires	Venezuela	x	13.21	x	13.09	13.43	12.95	13.43	
6	Tamara Myers	Bahamas	13.15	x	x	13.31	12.79	x	13.31	
7	Thelma Fuentes	Guatemala	13.04	12.65	13.04	12.76	12.42	12.82	13.04	
8	Natrena Hooper	Guyana	12.27	12.61	12.18	x	x	12.38	12.61	
9	Rebeca Barrientos	El Salvador	11.80	x	11.89				11.89	

=== Shot put ===
6 July

Rank	Name	Nationality	#1	#2	#3	#4	#5	#6	Result	Notes
1st place, gold medalist(s)	Rosa Ramírez	Dominican Republic	16.98	x	17.75	17.48	17.89	17.14	17.89	
2nd place, silver medalist(s)	Danielle Sloley	Jamaica	16.81	x	x	16.12	16.57	x	16.81	
3rd place, bronze medalist(s)	Layselys Jiménez	Cuba	16.79	16.75	16.62	16.79	16.61	x	16.79	
4	Ahymara Espinoza	Venezuela	15.91	16.75	16.58	16.34	16.30	16.45	16.75	
5	Cherisse Murray	Trinidad and Tobago	x	16.59	15.48	15.25	15.92	16.45	16.59	
6	Kelsie Murrel-Ross	Grenada	15.70	15.13	x	15.02	14.54	15.14	15.70	
7	Maia Campbell	United States Virgin Islands	14.36	14.85	x	14.99	14.60	14.53	14.99	
8	Alejandra Rosales	El Salvador	x	11.41	11.28	11.57	x	12.01	12.01	

=== Discus throw ===
7 July

Rank	Name	Nationality	#1	#2	#3	#4	#5	#6	Result	Notes
1st place, gold medalist(s)	Silinda Morales	Cuba	58.08	61.95	60.91	61.63	59.36	60.33	61.95	
2nd place, silver medalist(s)	Alma Pollorena	Mexico	52.80	55.58	x	53.34	53.89	x	55.58	
3rd place, bronze medalist(s)	Adrienne Adams	Jamaica	49.33	x	51.70	x	55.43	x	55.43	
4	Veronica Luzania	Mexico	51.14	x	52.43	50.24	52.81	51.41	52.81	
5	Aixa Middleton	Panama	x	47.77	49.63	x	x	43.93	49.63	
6	Jamora Alves	Grenada	x	x	47.53	45.23	48.93	47.95	48.93	
7	Alejandra Rosales	El Salvador	39.81	42.09	40.66	38.35	41.14	x	42.09	
	Marie Forbes	Jamaica							DNS	
	Denia Caballero	Cuba							DNS	

=== Hammer throw ===
7 July

Rank	Name	Nationality	#1	#2	#3	#4	#5	#6	Result	Notes
1st place, gold medalist(s)	Rosa Rodríguez	Venezuela	71.62	68.95	x	x	69.66	x	71.62	GR
2nd place, silver medalist(s)	Erica Belvit	Jamaica	x	x	63.17	x	69.23	70.04	70.04	
3rd place, bronze medalist(s)	Mayra Gaviria	Colombia	66.07	68.61	68.58	67.19	66.70	x	68.61	PB
4	Yaritza Martínez	Cuba	62.62	61.14	62.94	x	64.99	x	64.99	
5	Yanielys Torres	Puerto Rico	58.57	x	60.13	x	x	61.02	61.02	
6	Marie Forbes	Jamaica	x	60.84	59.38	60.80	59.55	58.18	60.84	
7	Leidis Viamonte	Cuba	57.40	57.93	x	x	x	56.73	57.93	
8	Silenis Vargas	Venezuela	54.42	x	53.43	53.14	55.15	x	55.15	
9	María Soto	El Salvador	45.92	x	44.38				45.92	

=== Javelin throw ===
4 July

Rank	Name	Nationality	#1	#2	#3	#4	#5	#6	Result	Notes
1st place, gold medalist(s)	Flor Ruiz	Colombia	56.31	55.55	60.52	x	x	57.14	60.52	
2nd place, silver medalist(s)	María Lucelly Murillo	Colombia	x	x	58.92	54.22	x	57.08	58.92	
3rd place, bronze medalist(s)	Luz Mariana Castro	Mexico	55.35	57.50	55.86	56.48	53.86	56.22	57.50	
4	Rhema Otabor	Bahamas	54.37	x	56.34	54.68	x	x	56.34	
5	Marianaily Silva	Cuba	54.00	53.43	x	50.51	x	x	54.00	
6	Sophia Rivera	Puerto Rico	x	x	x	51.09	52.67	49.23	52.67	
7	Yessi Tejada	Dominican Republic	49.01	45.15	47.86	45.71	45.93	42.65	49.01	
8	Coralys Ortiz	Puerto Rico	x	x	x	45.45	r		45.45	

=== Heptathlon ===
5–6 July

The highest mark recorded in each event is highlighted in yellow

Rank	Athlete	Nationality	100m H	HJ	SP	200m	LJ	JT	800m	Points	Notes
1st place, gold medalist(s)	Marys Patterson	Cuba	14.03	1.86	12.22	24.62	5.85	40.48	2:16.52	5978	
2nd place, silver medalist(s)	Martha Araújo	Colombia	13.64	1.62	13.05	25.32	6.15	51.27	2:21.68	5960	
3rd place, bronze medalist(s)	Alysbeth Félix	Puerto Rico	14.14	1.71	11.49	24.88	6.41	40.41	2:17.62	5860	
4	Lilian Borja	Mexico	13.92	1.71	12.42	25.16	5.74w	39.61	2:16.78	5717	
5	Yessi Tejada	Dominican Republic	14.83	1.56	13.09	25.31	5.63	47.79	2:31.71	5372	PB
6	Vanessa Mercera	Curaçao	14.13	1.80	NM	24.97	5.46	25.40	2:19.78	4732	
7	Ana Isabella González	El Salvador	15.34	1.74	8.67	26.61	5.18w	24.90	2:23.77	4650	NU20R
8	Jomarie Carmona	Puerto Rico	13.93	1.62	12.77	25.95	5.30w	34.85	DQ	4473	
	Adriana Rodríguez	Cuba	13.21	1.74	13.64	24.06	6.32	20.99	DNS	DNF	

== Mixed results ==
=== 4 × 400 metres relay ===
7 July

Rank	Lane	Nation	Competitors	Time	Notes
1st place, gold medalist(s)	5	Dominican Republic	Alexander Ogando, Fiordaliza Cofil, Lidio Feliz, Anabel Medina	3:14.81	
2nd place, silver medalist(s)	7	Cuba	Leonardo Castillo, Roxana Gómez, Yoandys Lescay, Lisneidy Veitía	3:16.97	
3rd place, bronze medalist(s)	6	Colombia	Raúl Mena, Lina Licona, Jhonatan Rodríguez, Evelis Aguilar	3:20.36	
4	4	El Salvador	José René Navas, Nathalie Almendarez, Samuel Ibáñez, Yency Chamur	3:36.99	
