= Athletics at the 2022 Caribbean Games – Results =

These are the full results of the athletics competition at the 2022 Caribbean Games which took place on 1 and 2 July 2022 at Stade Roger Zami in Le Gosier, Guadeloupe.

== Men's results ==
=== 100 metres ===
Heats – 1 July
Wind:
Heat 1: -1.2 m/s, Heat 2: -1.9 m/s, Heat 3: -0.7 m/s, Heat 4: -0.1 m/s

Rank	Heat	Name	Nationality	Time	Notes
1	2	Kion Benjamin	Trinidad and Tobago	10.60	Q
2	1	Franquelo Pérez	Dominican Republic	10.63	Q
3	4	Darion Skerrit	Antigua and Barbuda	10.70	Q
4	4	Javon Rawlins	Saint Vincent and the Grenadines	10.72	q
5	3	Ángelo Féliz	Dominican Republic	10.78	Q
6	2	Sage Primus	Saint Vincent and the Grenadines	10.80	q
7	2	Royden Peets	Saint Kitts and Nevis	10.84	
8	2	Mikkel Bassue	British Virgin Islands	10.86	
9	3	Keiron Desouza	Guyana	10.96	
10	3	Barack Matthew	Antigua and Barbuda	11.02	
11	3	Ke'andrae Campbell	British Virgin Islands	11.07	
12	4	Ebiye Ogoun Jr.	Saint Kitts and Nevis	11.10	
13	3	Adrian Curry	Bahamas	11.18	
14	1	Jaydon Moore	Trinidad and Tobago	11.24	
15	2	Christian Gabriel	Grenada	11.49	
	1	Loïc Helene	Martinique	DQ	
	1	Shainer Reginfo	Cuba	DQ	

Final – 1 July

Wind: -0.2 m/s

Rank	Lane	Name	Nationality	Time	Notes
1st place, gold medalist(s)	3	Kion Benjamin	Trinidad and Tobago	10.36	
2nd place, silver medalist(s)	4	Franquelo Pérez	Dominican Republic	10.55	
3rd place, bronze medalist(s)	2	Darion Skerrit	Antigua and Barbuda	10.72	
4		Javon Rawlins	Saint Vincent and the Grenadines	10.74	
5		Ángelo Féliz	Dominican Republic	10.77	
6		Sage Primus	Saint Vincent and the Grenadines	10.83	

=== 400 metres ===
Heats – 1 July

Rank	Heat	Name	Nationality	Time	Notes
1	3	Anthony Cox	Jamaica	46.15	Q
2	2	Kyle Gale	Barbados	46.49	Q
3	2	Leonardo Castillo	Cuba	46.68	q
4	2	Revon Williams	Guyana	47.01	q
5	3	Michael Joseph	Saint Lucia	47.21	q
6	1	Wilbert Encarnación	Dominican Republic	47.25	Q
7	1	Miguel Nicholas	Barbados	47.39	
8	2	Che Lara	Trinidad and Tobago	47.72	
9	3	Desroy Jordan	Saint Vincent and the Grenadines	47.87	
10	3	Aymeric Fermely	Guadeloupe	48.03	
11	1	Correy Sherrod	Bahamas	48.26	
12	1	Troy Mason	Grenada	49.42	
13	3	Malik John	British Virgin Islands	49.48	
14	2	Sharim Hamilton	Saint Kitts and Nevis	49.95	
	1	Vadley Sylvester	British Virgin Islands	DNF	

Final – 2 July

Rank	Lane	Name	Nationality	Time	Notes
1st place, gold medalist(s)		Anthony Cox	Jamaica	45.48	
2nd place, silver medalist(s)		Kyle Gale	Barbados	46.23	
3rd place, bronze medalist(s)		Leonardo Castillo	Cuba	46.24	
4		Wilbert Encarnación	Dominican Republic	46.73	
5		Revon Williams	Guyana	47.09	
6		Michael Joseph	Saint Lucia	47.36	

=== 1500 metres ===
1 July

Rank	Name	Nationality	Time	Notes
1st place, gold medalist(s)	Carlos Alberto Vilches	Puerto Rico	3:56.41	
2nd place, silver medalist(s)	Hector Pagan	Puerto Rico	3:56.81	
3rd place, bronze medalist(s)	Handal Roban	Saint Vincent and the Grenadines	3:58.37	
4	Ryan Outerbridge	Bermuda	3:59.58	
5	Hansel Abréu	Cuba	3:59.98	
6	Tarik Xavier	Saint Lucia	4:02.52	

=== 110 metres hurdles ===
1 July
Wind: -1.2 m/s

Rank	Lane	Name	Nationality	Time	Notes
1st place, gold medalist(s)		Rasheem Brown	Cayman Islands	13.72	
2nd place, silver medalist(s)		Oscar Smith	Bahamas	13.96	
3rd place, bronze medalist(s)		Kenny Fletcher	Guadeloupe	14.00	

=== 4 × 100 metres relay ===
2 July

Rank	Lane	Nation	Competitors	Time	Notes
1st place, gold medalist(s)		Dominican Republic	César Elias Jasmin, Franquelo Pérez, Ángelo Féliz, Wilber Encarnación	41.31	
2nd place, silver medalist(s)		Trinidad and Tobago	Jaydon Moore, Kion Benjamin, Che Lara, Lorenzo Luces	41.64	
		Antigua and Barbuda	Taeco O'Garro, Darion Skerritt, Sheldon Noble, Barak Matthew	41.87	
3rd place, bronze medalist(s)		British Virgin Islands	Mikkel Raquahn Bassue, Vadley Sylvester, Malik John, Ke'andrae Campbell	42.24	
4		Guadeloupe	Aymeric Fermely, Kenny Fletcher, Erwann Abenaqui, Gwenael Navis	42.90	

=== Long jump ===
1 July

Rank	Name	Nationality	#1	#2	#3	#4	#5	#6	Result	Notes
1st place, gold medalist(s)	Sheldon Noble	Antigua and Barbuda	7.22	7.13	7.18	7.31	x	x	7.31	
2nd place, silver medalist(s)	Louis Gordon	Cayman Islands	7.11	x	x	7.23	7.13	7.12	7.23	
3rd place, bronze medalist(s)	Nishorn Pierre	Grenada	6.91	6.75	6.88	6.90	6.79	6.76	6.91	
4	Daniel Mustelier	Cuba							6.84	
5	Mickael Michely	Guadeloupe							6.72	
6	Mikal Dill	Bermuda							6.54	
7	Gwenael Navis	Guadeloupe							5.27	

=== Triple jump ===
2 July

Rank	Name	Nationality	#1	#2	#3	#4	#5	#6	Result	Notes
1st place, gold medalist(s)	Andy Hechavarría	Cuba	x	16.07	x	15.77	16.40	x	16.40	
2nd place, silver medalist(s)	Jemuel Miller	Barbados	15.15	x	x	15.09	16.28w	15.57	16.28w	
3rd place, bronze medalist(s)	Nathan Crawford-Wallis	Barbados	x	16.11	16.02	–	16.02	15.84	16.11	
4	Taeco Ogarro	Antigua and Barbuda	x	15.72	x	15.58	x	15.90	15.90	
5	César Elias Jasmin	Dominican Republic	15.37	15.60	15.23	15.61	x	15.35	15.61	
6	Lorenzo Luces	Trinidad and Tobago	14.68	x	15.26	15.22	14.97w	14.90	15.26	
7	Nishorn Pierre	Grenada	14.46	14.29	13.82	14.14	13.69	13.42	14.46	
8	Cedric Luissint	Guadeloupe	x	13.90	x	13.25	x	x	13.90	
9	Lucas Etenna	Guadeloupe							13.56	

=== Shot put ===
2 July

Rank	Name	Nationality	#1	#2	#3	#4	#5	#6	Result	Notes
1st place, gold medalist(s)	Juan Carley Vázquez	Cuba	16.88	18.09	17.67	x	18.05	18.00	18.09	
2nd place, silver medalist(s)	Djimon Gumbs	British Virgin Islands	16.77	17.90	17.20	17.99	17.33	17.18	17.99	
3rd place, bronze medalist(s)	Jorge Contreras	Puerto Rico	x	17.40	16.84	16.68	17.59	x	17.59	
4	Johann Jeremiah	Grenada	16.04	x	x	16.31	16.48	16.90	16.90	
5	William Cadenat	Martinique	16.38	x	16.17	x	16.44	16.23	16.44	
6	Diamante Gumbs	British Virgin Islands	15.01	x	x	x	x	x	15.01	
7	Leroy Malcolm	Cayman Islands							13.18	

== Women's results ==
=== 100 metres ===
Heats – 1 July
Wind:
Heat 1: 0.0 m/s, Heat 2: -0.1 m/s, Heat 3: -1.2 m/s

Rank	Heat	Name	Nationality	Time	Notes
1	1	Julien Alfred	Saint Lucia	11.34	Q
2	1	Leah Bertrand	Trinidad and Tobago	11.79	q
3	2	Akilah Lewis	Trinidad and Tobago	11.80	Q
4	3	Camille Rutherford	Bahamas	11.87	Q
5	1	Juvonna Cornette	Guyana	11.88	q
6	3	Martha Méndez	Dominican Republic	11.89	q
7	2	Laura Moreira	Cuba	11.93	
8	2	Melodi Juara	Cuba	11.96	
9	3	Wilvely Santana	Dominican Republic	12.05	
10	2	Auriane Lina	Martinique	12.12	
11	2	Beyoncé De Freitas	British Virgin Islands	12.16	
12	3	Enis Pérez	Cuba	12.21	
13	1	Tri-tania Lowe	Antigua and Barbuda	12.23	
14	1	Adriana Macin	Guadeloupe	12.70	
15	3	Yasmina Naigre	Guadeloupe	12.88	

Final – 1 July

Wind: -0.2 m/s

Rank	Lane	Name	Nationality	Time	Notes
1st place, gold medalist(s)		Julien Alfred	Saint Lucia	11.07	
2nd place, silver medalist(s)		Akilah Lewis	Trinidad and Tobago	11.55	
3rd place, bronze medalist(s)		Leah Bertrand	Trinidad and Tobago	11.57	
4		Camille Rutherford	Bahamas	11.62	
5		Juvonna Cornette	Guyana	11.72	
6		Martha Méndez	Dominican Republic	11.74	

=== 400 metres ===
Heats – 1 July

Rank	Heat	Name	Nationality	Time	Notes
1	1	Fiordaliza Cofil	Dominican Republic	52.69	Q
2	2	Megan Moss	Bahamas	54.23	Q
3	1	Rae-Anne Serville	Trinidad and Tobago	54.81	Q
4	1	Suany Rodríguez	Cuba	55.05	q
5	2	Laureleen Concoriet	Martinique	55.48	Q
6	2	Charlene Figaro	Guadeloupe	56.17	q
7	2	Cece Charles	Grenada	57.24	
8	1	Liagna Boris	Cuba	57.45	
9	1	Melody Fardella	Guadeloupe	57.64	
10	2	Kereser Augustin	Saint Lucia	58.64	
11	1	Namibia Clavier	Saint Kitts and Nevis	1:01.08	

Final – 2 July

Rank	Lane	Name	Nationality	Time	Notes
1st place, gold medalist(s)		Fiordaliza Cofil	Dominican Republic	51.31	
2nd place, silver medalist(s)		Megan Moss	Bahamas	52.53	
3rd place, bronze medalist(s)		Suany Rodríguez	Cuba	53.70	
4		Laureleen Concoriet	Martinique	54.87	
5		Charlene Figaro	Guadeloupe	55.76	
		Rae-Anne Serville	Trinidad and Tobago	?	

=== 800 metres ===
1 July

Rank	Name	Nationality	Time	Notes
1st place, gold medalist(s)	Daily Cooper	Cuba	2:05.41	
2nd place, silver medalist(s)	Joanna Archer	Guyana	2:10.83	
3rd place, bronze medalist(s)	Mikaela Smith	United States Virgin Islands	2:14.36	
4	Keva Pierre	Dominica	2:15.36	
5	Rebecca Bernardin	Turks and Caicos Islands	2:20.58	

=== 100 metres hurdles ===
Heats – 1 July
Wind:
Heat 1: -0.7 m/s, Heat 2: -0.5 m/s

Rank	Heat	Name	Nationality	Time	Notes
1	1	Greisys Roble	Cuba	13.35	Q
2	1	Hannah Connell	Barbados	13.41	Q
3	2	Shaneylix Davila	Puerto Rico	13.42	Q
4	1	Keily Pérez	Cuba	13.44	q
5	2	Lisyanet Ruiz	Cuba	13.57	Q
6	2	Tamia Badal	Trinidad and Tobago	13.58	q
7	2	Mariani Otaño	Dominican Republic	13.84	
8	1	Chloe Celigny	Guadeloupe	14.86	

Final – 2 July

Wind: -0.3 m/s

Rank	Lane	Name	Nationality	Time	Notes
1st place, gold medalist(s)		Greisys Roble	Cuba	13.11	
2nd place, silver medalist(s)		Keily Pérez	Cuba	13.27	
3rd place, bronze medalist(s)		Shaneylix Davila	Puerto Rico	13.32	
4		Lisyanet Ruiz	Cuba	13.60	
5		Hannah Connell	Barbados	13.71	
6		Tamia Badal	Trinidad and Tobago	13.83	

=== 4 × 100 metres relay ===
2 July

Rank	Lane	Nation	Competitors	Time	Notes
1st place, gold medalist(s)		Trinidad and Tobago	Tamia Badal, Akilah Lewis, Naomi Campbell, Leah Bertrand	45.19	
2nd place, silver medalist(s)		Cuba	Melodi Juara, Laura Moreira, Greisys Roble, Enis Pérez	45.47	
3rd place, bronze medalist(s)		Dominican Republic	Marianny Otaño, Fiordaliza Cofil, Wilvely Santana, Martha Méndez	46.21	

=== Long jump ===
1 July

Rank	Name	Nationality	#1	#2	#3	#4	#5	#6	Result	Notes
1st place, gold medalist(s)	Paola Fernández	Puerto Rico	6.15	6.01	x	6.13	5.90	5.90	6.15	
2nd place, silver medalist(s)	Yanisley Carrión	Cuba	5.79	x	5.76	x	5.74	6.00	6.00	
3rd place, bronze medalist(s)	Chantoba Bright	Guyana	5.85	x	x	5.85	5.30	5.84	5.85	
4	Chloe Celigny	Guadeloupe	x	x	5.74	x	5.67w	5.54	5.74	
5	Xiomara Malone	British Virgin Islands	5.25	5.58	5.65	5.61	5.63	5.55	5.65	
6	Arianna Hayde	British Virgin Islands							5.43	
7	Leidys Pérez	Cuba							5.30	

=== Javelin throw ===
1 July

Rank	Name	Nationality	#1	#2	#3	#4	#5	#6	Result	Notes
1st place, gold medalist(s)	Rhema Otabor	Bahamas	53.38	52.83	–	–	50.27	49.09	53.38	
2nd place, silver medalist(s)	Marianaily Silva	Cuba							37.96	
3rd place, bronze medalist(s)	Jamillet Bautista	Dominican Republic							37.25	
