= Athletics at the 2023 Pan American Games – Qualification =

The following is the qualification system for the Athletics at the 2023 Pan American Games competition.

== Qualification system ==
A total of 778 athletes will qualify to compete. Each nation may enter a maximum of two athletes in each individual event, and one team per relay event. Each event has a maximum number of competitors and a minimum performance standard. Chile as host nation, is granted an automatic athlete slot per event, in the event no one qualifies for that respective event.

The winner of each individual event (plus top two relay teams per event), from four regional qualification tournaments automatically qualified with the standard (even if not reached). If an event quota is not filled, athletes will be invited till the maximum number per event is reached.

For relays, each country can enter two relay only competitors to participate. The other members of each relay team must be registered in an individual event.

Qualifying standards must be achieved between 1 January 2022 and 18 September 2023.

== Qualification timeline ==
Events	Date	Venue
2022 NACAC Championships	19–21 August 2022	(The Bahamas) Freeport, Bahamas
2022 South American Games	12–15 October 2022	Asunción, Paraguay
2023 Central American and Caribbean Games	8–23 July 2023	San Salvador, El Salvador
2023 South American Senior Athletics Championship	28–30 July 2023	São Paulo, Brazil

== Track events ==
=== Men's track events ===
==== Men's 100 m ====
Does not include indoor achievements or races with wind above 2.0 m/s. Entry number: 24 athletes

Qualification standard	No. of athletes	Qualified athlete
2021 Junior Pan American Games	1	Erik Cardoso (BRA)
2022 NACAC Senior Athletics Championship	1	Ackeem Blake (JAM)
2022 South American Games	1	Franco Florio (ARG)
2023 Central American and Caribbean Games	1	Emanuel Archibald (GUY)
2023 South American Senior Athletics Championship	1	Asinga Issamade (SUR)
Pan American Area Ranking	19	
Total	24	

==== Men's 200 m ====
Entry number: 24 athletes

Qualification standard	No. of athletes	Qualified athlete
2021 Junior Pan American Games	1	Anderson Marquinez (ECU)
2022 NACAC Senior Athletics Championship	1	Andrew Hudson (JAM)
2022 South American Games	1	Lucas Rodrigues (BRA)
2023 Central American and Caribbean Games	1	Alexander Ogando (DOM)
2023 South American Senior Athletics Championship	1	Asinga Issamade (SUR)
Pan American Area Ranking	19	
Total	24	

==== Men's 400 m ====
Entry number: 18 athletes

Qualification standard	No. of athletes	Qualified athlete
2021 Junior Pan American Games	1	Luis Avilés (MEX)
2022 NACAC Senior Athletics Championship	1	Christopher Taylor (JAM)
2022 South American Games	1	Elián Larregina (ARG)
2023 Central American and Caribbean Games	1	Jereem Richards (TTO)
2023 South American Senior Athletics Championship	1	Anthony Zambrano (COL)
Pan American Area Ranking	13	
Total	18	

==== Men's 800 m ====
Entry number: 18 athletes

Qualification standard	No. of athletes	Qualified athlete
2021 Junior Pan American Games	1	Ryan López (VEN)
2022 NACAC Senior Athletics Championship	1	Jonah Koech (USA)
2022 South American Games	1	Chamar Chambers (PAN)
2023 Central American and Caribbean Games	1	Handal Roban (VIN)
2023 South American Senior Athletics Championship	1	Eduardo Moreira (BRA)
Pan American Area Ranking	13	
Total	18	

==== Men's 1500 m ====
Entry number: 13 athletes

Qualification standard	No. of athletes	Qualified athlete
2021 Junior Pan American Games	1	Juan Diego Castro (CRC)
2022 NACAC Senior Athletics Championship	1	Eric Holt (USA)
2022 South American Games	1	Federico Bruno (ARG)
2023 Central American and Caribbean Games	1	Fernando Martínez (MEX)
2023 South American Senior Athletics Championship	1	Diego Lacamoire (ARG)
Pan American Area Ranking	8	
Total	13	

==== Men's 5000 m ====
Entry number: 13 athletes

Qualification standard	No. of athletes	Qualified athlete
2021 Junior Pan American Games	1	David Ninavia (BOL)
2022 NACAC Senior Athletics Championship	1	Woody Kincaid (USA)
2022 South American Games	1	Federico Bruno (ARG)
2023 Central American and Caribbean Games	1	Héctor Pagán Ortíz (PUR)
2023 South American Senior Athletics Championship	1	Valentín Soca (URU)
Pan American Area Ranking	8	
Total	13	

==== Men's 10,000 m ====
Entry number: 13 athletes

Qualification standard	No. of athletes	Qualified athlete
2021 Junior Pan American Games	1	Hector Pagan (PUR)
2022 NACAC Senior Athletics Championship	1	Sean McGorty (USA)
2022 South American Games	1	Carlos Díaz (CHI)
2023 Central American and Caribbean Games	1	Victor Zambrano (MEX)
2023 South American Senior Athletics Championship	0	–
Pan American Area Ranking	9	
Total	13	

==== Men's 110 m hurdles ====
Entry number: 18 athletes

Qualification standard	No. of athletes	Qualified athlete
2021 Junior Pan American Games	1	Marcos Herrera (ECU)
2022 NACAC Senior Athletics Championship	1	Freddie Crittenden (USA)
2022 South American Games	1	Eduardo de Deus (BRA)
2023 Central American and Caribbean Games	1	Shane Brathwaite (BAR)
2023 South American Senior Athletics Championship	0	–
Pan American Area Ranking	14	
Total	18	

==== Men's 400 m hurdles ====
Entry number: 18 athletes

Qualification standard	No. of athletes	Qualified athlete
2021 Junior Pan American Games	1	Yoao Illas (CUB)
2022 NACAC Senior Athletics Championship	1	Kyron McMaster (IVB)
2022 South American Games	1	Fanor Escobar (COL)
2023 Central American and Caribbean Games	1	Pablo Ibáñez (ESA)
2023 South American Senior Athletics Championship	1	Matheus Silva (BRA)
Pan American Area Ranking	13	
Total	18	

==== Men's 3000 m steeplechase ====
Entry number: 13 athletes

Qualification standard	No. of athletes	Qualified athlete
2021 Junior Pan American Games	1	Julio Palomino (PER)
2022 NACAC Senior Athletics Championship	1	Evan Jager (USA)
2022 South American Games	1	Gerard Giraldo (COL)
2023 Central American and Caribbean Games	1	Carlos San Martín (COL)
2023 South American Senior Athletics Championship	1	Gualberto Molina (ARG)
Pan American Area Ranking	8	
Total	13	

=== Women's track events ===
==== Women's 100 m ====
Entry number: 24 athletes

Qualification standard	No. of athletes	Qualified athlete
2021 Junior Pan American Games	1	Gabriela Suárez (ECU)
2022 NACAC Senior Athletics Championship	1	Shericka Jackson (JAM)
2022 South American Games	1	Ana Azevedo (BRA)
2023 Central American and Caribbean Games	1	Julien Alfred (LCA)
2023 South American Senior Athletics Championship	1	Vitória Rosa (BRA)
Pan American Area Ranking	19	
Total	24	

==== Women's 200 m ====
Entry number: 24 athletes

Qualification standard	No. of athletes	Qualified athlete
2021 Junior Pan American Games	~~1~~ 0	~~Gabriela Suárez (ECU)~~
2022 NACAC Senior Athletics Championship	1	Brittany Brown (USA)
2022 South American Games	0	-
2023 Central American and Caribbean Games	1	Yanique Dayle (JAM)
2023 South American Senior Athletics Championship	1	Nicole Arce (ECU)
Pan American Area Ranking	20	
Total	24	

==== Women's 400 m ====
Entry number: 18 athletes

Qualification standard	No. of athletes	Qualified athlete
2021 Junior Pan American Games	1	Fiordaliza Cofil (DOM)
2022 NACAC Senior Athletics Championship	1	Shaunae Miller-Uibo (BAH)
2022 South American Games	1	Evelis Aguilar (COL)
2023 Central American and Caribbean Games	1	Marileidy Paulino (DOM)
2023 South American Senior Athletics Championship	1	Martina Weil (CHI)
Pan American Area Ranking	13	
Total	18	

==== Women's 800 m ====
Entry number: 18 athletes

Qualification standard	No. of athletes	Qualified athlete
2021 Junior Pan American Games	1	Daily Cooper (CUB)
2022 NACAC Senior Athletics Championship	1	Ajeé Wilson (USA)
2022 South American Games	1	Déborah Rodríguez (URU)
2023 Central American and Caribbean Games	1	Rose Almanza (CUB)
2023 South American Senior Athletics Championship	1	Flávia Lima (BRA)
Pan American Area Ranking	13	
Total	18	

==== Women's 1500 m ====
Entry number: 13 athletes

Qualification standard	No. of athletes	Qualified athlete
2021 Junior Pan American Games	1	Anahí Álvarez (MEX)
2022 NACAC Senior Athletics Championship	1	Heather Maclean (USA)
2022 South American Games	1	Fedra Luna (ARG)
2023 Central American and Caribbean Games	1	Joselyn Brea (VEN)
2023 South American Senior Athletics Championship	0	–
Pan American Area Ranking	9	
Total	13	

==== Women's 5000 m ====
Entry number: 13 athletes

Qualification standard	No. of athletes	Qualified athlete
2021 Junior Pan American Games	~~1~~ 0	~~Anahí Álvarez (MEX)~~
2022 NACAC Senior Athletics Championship	1	Natosha Rogers (USA)
2022 South American Games	1	Fedra Luna (ARG)
2023 Central American and Caribbean Games	1	Joselyn Brea (VEN)
2023 South American Senior Athletics Championship	0	–
Pan American Area Ranking	9	
Total	13	

==== Women's 10,000 m ====
Entry number: 13 athletes

Qualification standard	No. of athletes	Qualified athlete
2021 Junior Pan American Games	1	Sofia Isabel Mamani (PER)
2022 NACAC Senior Athletics Championship	1	Stephanie Bruce (USA)
2022 South American Games	1	Florencia Borelli (ARG)
2023 Central American and Caribbean Games	1	Laura Galván (MEX)
2023 South American Championships in Athletics	1	Luz Mery Rojas (PER)
Pan American Area Ranking	8	
Total	13	

==== Women's 100 m hurdles ====
Does not include indoor achievements

Entry number: 18 athletes

Qualification standard	No. of athletes	Qualified athlete
2021 Junior Pan American Games	1	Greisys Roble (CUB)
2022 NACAC Senior Athletics Championship	1	Alaysha Johnson (USA)
2022 South American Games	1	Yoveinny Mota (VEN)
2023 Central American and Caribbean Games	1	Jasmine Camacho-Quinn (PUR)
2023 South American Senior Athletics Championship	1	Caroline Tomaz (BRA)
Pan American Area Ranking	13	
Total	18	

==== Women's 400 m hurdles ====
Entry number: 18 athletes

Qualification standard	No. of athletes	Qualified athlete
2021 Junior Pan American Games	1	Chayenne da Silva (BRA)
2022 NACAC Senior Athletics Championship	1	Shiann Salmon (JAM)
2022 South American Games	1	Valeria Cabezas (COL)
2023 Central American and Caribbean Games	1	Zurian Hechavarría (CUB)
2023 South American Senior Athletics Championship	0	–
Pan American Area Ranking	14	
Total	18	

==== Women's 3000 m steeplechase ====
Entry number: 13 athletes

Qualification standard	No. of athletes	Qualified athlete
2021 Junior Pan American Games	1	Mirelle da Silva (BRA)
2022 NACAC Senior Athletics Championship	1	Gabrielle Jennings (USA)
2022 South American Games	1	Belén Casetta (ARG)
2023 Central American and Caribbean Games	1	Alondra Texidor (PUR)
2023 South American Senior Athletics Championship	1	Tatiane da Silva (BRA)
Pan American Area Ranking	8	
Total	13	

== Road events ==
=== Men's road events ===
==== Men's marathon ====
Entry number: 21 athletes

Qualification standard	No. of athletes	Qualified athlete
2022 NACAC Senior Athletics Championship	0	-
2022 South American Games	1	Christian Vascónez (ECU)
2023 Central American and Caribbean Games	1	
2023 South American Senior Athletics Championship	1	
Pan American Area Ranking	18	
Total	21	

==== Men's 20 km walk ====
Entry number: 17 athletes

Qualification standard	No. of athletes	Qualified athlete
2021 Junior Pan American Games	1	David Hurtado (ECU)
2022 NACAC Senior Athletics Championship	1	José Eduardo Flores (GUA)
2022 South American Games	1	Brian Pintado (ECU)
2023 Central American and Caribbean Games	1	José Luis Doctor (MEX)
2023 South American Senior Athletics Championship	1	Luis Henry Campos (PER)
Pan American Area Ranking	8	
Total	13	

=== Women's road events ===
==== Women's marathon ====
Entry number: 21 athletes

Qualification standard	No. of athletes	Qualified athlete
2022 NACAC Senior Athletics Championship	0	-
2022 South American Games	1	Rosa Chacha (ECU)
2023 Central American and Caribbean Games	1	
2023 South American Senior Athletics Championship	1	
Pan American Area Ranking	18	
Total	21	

==== Women's 20 km walk ====
Entry number: 17 athletes

Qualification standard	No. of athletes	Qualified athlete
2021 Junior Pan American Games	1	Glenda Morejón (ECU)
2022 NACAC Senior Athletics Championship	1	Mirna Ortiz (GUA)
2022 South American Games	0	-
2023 Central American and Caribbean Games	1	Alejandra Ortega (MEX)
2023 South American Senior Athletics Championship	1	Mary Luz Andía (PER)
Pan American Area Ranking	13	
Total	17	

== Field events ==
=== Men's field events ===
==== Men's high jump ====
Entry number: 12 athletes

Qualification standard	No. of athletes	Qualified athlete
2021 Junior Pan American Games	1	Erick Portillo (MEX)
2022 NACAC Senior Athletics Championship	1	Luis Enrique Zayas Hernandez (CUB)
2022 South American Games	1	Thiago Moura (BRA)
2023 Central American and Caribbean Games	1	Luis Castro (PUR)
2023 South American Senior Athletics Championship	1	Carlos Layoy (ARG)
Pan American Area Ranking	7	
Total	12	

==== Men's pole vault ====
Entry number: 12 athletes

Qualification standard	No. of athletes	Qualified athlete
2021 Junior Pan American Games	1	Dyander Pacho (ECU)
2022 NACAC Senior Athletics Championship	1	Eduardo Nápoles Banderas (CUB)
2022 South American Games	1	Germán Chiaraviglio (ARG)
2023 Central American and Caribbean Games	1	Jorge Luna (MEX)
2023 South American Senior Athletics Championship	0	–
Pan American Area Ranking	8	
Total	12	

==== Men's long jump ====
Entry number: 12 athletes

Qualification standard	No. of athletes	Qualified athlete
2021 Junior Pan American Games	1	Maikel Vidal (CUB)
2022 NACAC Senior Athletics Championship	1	William Williams (USA)
2022 South American Games	1	José Luis Mandros (PER)
2023 Central American and Caribbean Games	1	Alejandro Parada (CUB)
2023 South American Senior Athletics Championship	1	
Pan American Area Ranking	7	
Total	12	

==== Men's triple jump ====
Entry number: 12 athletes

Qualification standard	No. of athletes	Qualified athlete
2021 Junior Pan American Games	1	Andy Hechavarría (CUB)
2022 NACAC Senior Athletics Championship	1	Chris Benard (USA)
2022 South American Games	1	Leodan Torrealba (VEN)
2023 Central American and Caribbean Games	1	Lázaro Martínez (CUB)
2023 South American Senior Athletics Championship	1	Almir Cunha dos Santos (BRA)
Pan American Area Ranking	7	
Total	12	

==== Men's shot put ====
Entry number: 12 athletes

Qualification standard	No. of athletes	Qualified athlete
2021 Junior Pan American Games	1	Nazareno Sasia (ARG)
2022 NACAC Senior Athletics Championship	1	Roger Steen (USA)
2022 South American Games	1	Welington Morais (BRA)
2023 Central American and Caribbean Games	1	Uziel Muñoz (MEX)
2023 South American Senior Athletics Championship	0	–
Pan American Area Ranking	8	
Total	12	

==== Men's discus throw ====
Entry number: 12 athletes

Qualification standard	No. of athletes	Qualified athlete
2021 Junior Pan American Games	1	Lucas Nervi (CHI)
2022 NACAC Senior Athletics Championship	1	Traves Smikle (JAM)
2022 South American Games	1	Claudio Romero (CHI)
2023 Central American and Caribbean Games	1	Mario Díaz (CUB)
2023 South American Senior Athletics Championship	0	–
Pan American Area Ranking	8	
Total	12	

==== Men's hammer throw ====
Entry number: 12 athletes

Qualification standard	No. of athletes	Qualified athlete
2021 Junior Pan American Games	1	Alencar Pereira (BRA)
2022 NACAC Senior Athletics Championship	1	Rudy Winkler (USA)
2022 South American Games	1	Gabriel Kehr (CHI)
2023 Central American and Caribbean Games	1	Jerome Vega (PUR)
2023 South American Senior Athletics Championship	1	Humberto Mansilla (CHI)
Pan American Area Ranking	7	
Total	12	

==== Men's javelin throw ====
Entry number: 12 athletes

Qualification standard	No. of athletes	Qualified athlete
2021 Junior Pan American Games	1	Pedro Henrique Rodrigues (BRA)
2022 NACAC Senior Athletics Championship	1	Curtis Thompson (USA)
2022 South American Games	1	Luiz Maurício da Silva (BRA)
2023 Central American and Caribbean Games	1	Keshorn Walcott (TTO)
2023 South American Senior Athletics Championship	0	–
Pan American Area Ranking	8	
Total	12	

=== Women's field events ===
==== Women's high jump ====
Entry number: 12 athletes

Qualification standard	No. of athletes	Qualified athlete
2021 Junior Pan American Games	1	Jennifer Rodríguez (COL)
2022 NACAC Senior Athletics Championship	1	Vashti Cunningham (USA)
2022 South American Games	1	Valdileia Martins (BRA)
2023 Central American and Caribbean Games	1	Marysabel Senyu (DOM)
2023 South American Senior Athletics Championship	0	–
Pan American Area Ranking	8	
Total	12	

==== Women's pole vault ====
Entry number: 12 athletes

Qualification standard	No. of athletes	Qualified athlete
2021 Junior Pan American Games	1	Isabel de Quadros (BRA)
2022 NACAC Senior Athletics Championship	1	Alina McDonald (USA)
2022 South American Games	1	Robeilys Peinado (VEN)
2023 Central American and Caribbean Games	0	–
2023 South American Senior Athletics Championship	1	Juliana Campos (BRA)
Pan American Area Ranking	8	
Total	12	

==== Women's long jump ====
Entry number: 12 athletes

Qualification standard	No. of athletes	Qualified athlete
2021 Junior Pan American Games	1	Paola Fernández (PUR)
2022 NACAC Senior Athletics Championship	1	Quanesha Burks (USA)
2022 South American Games	1	Leticia Oro Melo (BRA)
2023 Central American and Caribbean Games	1	Natalia Linares (COL)
2023 South American Senior Athletics Championship	1	Eliane Martins (BRA)
Pan American Area Ranking	7	
Total	12	

==== Women's triple jump ====
Entry number: 12 athletes

Qualification standard	No. of athletes	Qualified athlete
2021 Junior Pan American Games	1	Leyanis Pérez (CUB)
2022 NACAC Senior Athletics Championship	1	Thea LaFond (DMA)
2022 South American Games	1	Gabriele dos Santos (BRA)
2023 Central American and Caribbean Games	1	Yulimar Rojas (VEN)
2023 South American Senior Athletics Championship	0	–
Pan American Area Ranking	7	
Total	12	

==== Women's shot put ====
Entry number: 12 athletes

Qualification standard	No. of athletes	Qualified athlete
2021 Junior Pan American Games	1	Rosa Ramírez (DOM)
2022 NACAC Senior Athletics Championship	1	Sarah Mitton (CAN)
2022 South American Games	1	Natalia Duco (CHI)
2023 Central American and Caribbean Games	0	–
2023 South American Senior Athletics Championship	1	Ivana Gallardo (CHI)
Pan American Area Ranking	7	
Total	12	

==== Women's discus throw ====
Entry number: 12 athletes

Qualification standard	No. of athletes	Qualified athlete
2021 Junior Pan American Games	1	Silinda Morales (CUB)
2022 NACAC Senior Athletics Championship	1	Laulauga Tausaga-Collins (USA)
2022 South American Games	1	Izabela da Silva (BRA)
2023 Central American and Caribbean Games	0	–
2023 South American Senior Athletics Championship	0	–
Pan American Area Ranking	9	
Total	12	

==== Women's hammer throw ====
Entry number: 12 athletes

Qualification standard	No. of athletes	Qualified athlete
2021 Junior Pan American Games	1	Yaritza Martínez (CUB)
2022 NACAC Senior Athletics Championship	1	Janee' Kassanavoid (USA)
2022 South American Games	1	Rosa Rodríguez (VEN)
2023 Central American and Caribbean Games	0	–
2023 South American Senior Athletics Championship	0	–
Pan American Area Ranking	9	
Total	12	

==== Women's javelin throw ====
Entry number: 12 athletes

Qualification standard	No. of athletes	Qualified athlete
2021 Junior Pan American Games	1	Juleisy Angulo (ECU)
2022 NACAC Senior Athletics Championship	1	Kara Winger (USA)
2022 South American Games	1	Flor Ruiz (COL)
2023 Central American and Caribbean Games	0	–
2023 South American Senior Athletics Championship	0	–
Pan American Area Ranking	7	
Total	12	

== Combined events ==
=== Men's decathlon ===
Entry number: 16 athletes

Qualification standard	No. of athletes	Qualified athlete
2021 Junior Pan American Games	1	José Fernando Ferreira (BRA)
2022 NACAC Senior Athletics Championship	0	–
2022 South American Games	1	Felipe dos Santos (BRA)
2023 Central American and Caribbean Games	1	Ayden Owens-Delerme (PUR)
2023 South American Senior Athletics Championship	0	–
Pan American Area Ranking	13	
Total	16	

=== Women's heptathlon ===
Entry number: 16 athletes

Qualification standard	No. of athletes	Qualified athlete
2021 Junior Pan American Games	1	Marys Patterson (CUB)
2022 NACAC Senior Athletics Championship	0	–
2022 South American Games	1	Martha Araújo (COL)
2023 Central American and Caribbean Games	0	–
2023 South American Senior Athletics Championship	0	–
Pan American Area Ranking	14	
Total	16	

== Relay events ==
Each invited NOC will be able to enter a maximum of 2 (two) competitors to participate only in each relay race. For the mixed 4 × 400 m relay they must enter 1 woman and 1 man. The other 4 (four) members of each relay team with a maximum of 6 (six) athletes (4 × 100 m, 4 × 400 m and mixed 4 × 400 m) should be entered in an individual event.

=== Men's 4 × 100 m relay ===
Entry number: 12 teams

Qualification standard	No. of teams	Qualified teams
2022 NACAC Senior Athletics Championship	2	United States; Trinidad and Tobago
2022 South American Games	2	Venezuela; Paraguay
2023 Central American and Caribbean Games	1	Dominican Republic
2023 South American Senior Athletics Championship	1	Brazil
Pan American Area Ranking	6	
Total	12	

=== Men's 4 × 400 m relay ===
Entry number: 12 teams

Qualification standard	No. of teams	Qualified teams
2022 NACAC Senior Athletics Championship	2	United States; Jamaica
2022 South American Games	2	Venezuela; Brazil
2023 Central American and Caribbean Games	2	Trinidad and Tobago; Barbados
2023 South American Senior Athletics Championship	2	
Pan American Area Ranking	4	
Total	12	

=== Women's 4 × 100 m relay ===
Entry number: 12 teams

Qualification standard	No. of teams	Qualified teams
2022 NACAC Senior Athletics Championship	2	United States; Bahamas
2022 South American Games	2	Colombia; Chile
2023 Central American and Caribbean Games	2	Cuba; Trinidad and Tobago
2023 South American Senior Athletics Championship	1	Brazil
Pan American Area Ranking	5	
Total	12	

=== Women's 4 × 400 m relay ===
Entry number: 12 teams

Qualification standard	No. of teams	Qualified teams
2022 NACAC Senior Athletics Championship	2	United States; Jamaica
2022 South American Games	2	Colombia; Brazil
2023 Central American and Caribbean Games	2	Cuba; Dominican Republic
2023 South American Senior Athletics Championship	2	
Pan American Area Ranking	4	
Total	12	

=== Mixed 4 × 400 m relay ===
Entry number: 8 teams

Qualification standard	No. of teams	Qualified teams
2022 NACAC Senior Athletics Championship	2	United States; Jamaica
2022 South American Games	2	Brazil; Ecuador
2023 Central American and Caribbean Games	2	Dominican Republic; Cuba
2023 South American Senior Athletics Championship	1	Colombia
Pan American Area Ranking	1	
Total	8	
