= Athletics at the 2022 Caribbean Games =

Athletics at the 1st Caribbean Games
- Dates: 1–2 July
- Host city: Le Gosier, Guadeloupe
- Venue: Stade Roger Zami
- Events: 15
- Participation: 113 athletes from 21 nations

The athletics competition at the 2022 Caribbean Games was held in Le Gosier, Guadeloupe, from 1 to 2 July at the Stade Roger Zami. Like the rest of the Games, it was open to athletes from the under-23 age category, i.e. born between 2000 and 2002.

== Medal summary ==
=== Men ===
Event	Gold		Silver		Bronze	
100 metres (-2.0 m/s)	Kion Benjamin; Trinidad and Tobago	10.36	Franquelo Pérez; Dominican Republic	10.55	Darion Skerrit; Antigua and Barbuda	10.72
400 metres	Anthony Cox; Jamaica	45.48	Kyle Gale; Barbados	46.23	Leonardo Castillo; Cuba	46.24
1500 metres	Carlos Alberto Vilches; Puerto Rico	3:56.41	Hector Pagan; Puerto Rico	3:56.81	Handal Roban; Saint Vincent and the Grenadines	3:58.37
110 metres hurdles (-1.2 m/s)	Rasheem Brown; Cayman Islands	13.72	Oscar Smith; Bahamas	13.96	Kenny Fletcher; Guadeloupe	14.00
4 × 100 metres relay	Dominican Republic; César Elias Jasmin; Franquelo Pérez; Ángelo Féliz; Wilber Encarnación	41.31	Trinidad and Tobago; Jaydon Moore; Kion Benjamin; Che Lara; Lorenzo Luces	41.64	British Virgin Islands; Mikkel Raquahn Bassue; Vadley Sylvester; Malik John; Ke'andrae Campbell	42.24
Long jump	Sheldon Noble; Antigua and Barbuda	7.31 m	Louis Gordon; Cayman Islands	7.23 m	Nishorn Pierre; Jamaica	6.91 m
Triple jump	Andy Hechavarría; Cuba	16.40 m	Jemuel Miller; Barbados	16.28 m (w)	Nathan Crawford-Wallis; Barbados	16.11 m
Shot put	Juan Carley Vázquez; Cuba	18.09 m	Djimon Gumbs; British Virgin Islands	17.99 m	Jorge Contreras; Puerto Rico	17.59 m

=== Women ===
Event	Gold		Silver		Bronze	
100 metres (-0.23 m/s)	Julien Alfred; Saint Lucia	11.07	Akilah Lewis; Trinidad and Tobago	11.55	Leah Bertrand; Trinidad and Tobago	11.57
400 metres	Fiordaliza Cofil; Dominican Republic	51.31	Megan Moss; Bahamas	52.53	Suany Rodríguez; Cuba	53.70
800 metres	Daily Cooper; Cuba	2:05.41	Joanna Archer; Guyana	2:10.83	Mikaela Smith; U.S. Virgin Islands	2:14.36
100 metres hurdles (-0.3 m/s)	Greisys Roble; Cuba	13.11	Keily Pérez; Cuba	13.27	Shaneylix Davila; Puerto Rico	13.32
4 × 100 metres relay	Trinidad and Tobago; Tamia Badal; Akilah Lewis; Naomi Campbell; Leah Bertrand	45.19	Cuba; Melodi Juara; Laura López; Greisys Roble; Enis Pérez	45.47	Dominican Republic; Marianny Otaño; Fiordaliza Cofil; Wilvely Santana; Martha Méndez	46.21
Long jump	Paola Fernández; Puerto Rico	6.15 m	Yanisley Carrión; Cuba	6.00 m	Chantoba Bright; Guyana	5.85 m
Javelin throw	Rhema Otabor; Bahamas	53.38 m	Marianaily Silva; Cuba	37.96 m	Jamillet Bautista; Dominican Republic	37.25 m

== Medal table ==
* Host nation (Guadeloupe)

Rank	Nation	Gold	Silver	Bronze	Total
1	Cuba (CUB)	4	4	2	10
2	Trinidad and Tobago (TTO)	2	2	1	5
3	Dominican Republic (DOM)	2	1	2	5
3	Puerto Rico (PUR)	2	1	2	5
5	Bahamas (BAH)	1	2	0	3
6	Cayman Islands (CAY)	1	1	0	2
7	Antigua and Barbuda (ATG)	1	0	1	2
7	Jamaica (JAM)	1	0	1	2
9	Saint Lucia (LCA)	1	0	0	1
10	Barbados (BAR)	0	2	1	3
11	British Virgin Islands (IVB)	0	1	1	2
11	Guyana (GUY)	0	1	1	2
13	Guadeloupe (GLP)*	0	0	1	1
13	Saint Vincent and the Grenadines (VIN)	0	0	1	1
13	U.S. Virgin Islands (ISV)	0	0	1	1
Totals (15 entries)		15	15	15	45

== Participating nations ==
- Antigua and Barbuda (5)
- Bahamas (6)
- Barbados (5)
- Bermuda (2)
- British Virgin Islands (9)
- Cayman Islands (3)
- Cuba (18)
- Dominica (1)
- Dominican Republic (9)
- Grenada (5)
- Guadeloupe (12)
- Guyana (5)
- Jamaica (1)
- Martinique (4)
- Puerto Rico (5)
- Saint Kitts and Nevis (4)
- Saint Lucia (4)
- Saint Vincent and the Grenadines (4)
- Trinidad and Tobago (9)
- Turks and Caicos Islands (1)
- United States Virgin Islands (1)
