= Shainer Reginfo =

Cuban sprinter (born 2002)

Personal information
- Full name: Shainer Reginfo Montoya
- Born: 8 April 2002 (age 24)

Sport
- Sport: Athletics
- Events: 100 metres; 200 metres; 4×100 m relay
- Coached by: Jorge Chacón

Achievements and titles
- Personal bests: 60 metres: 6.58 (Zaragoza, 2023); 100 metres: 9.90 NR (Salamanca, 2024); 200 metres: 20.51 (Andújar, 2022)
Medal record
Representing Cuba
Men's athletics
Pan American Games
Silver medal – second place	2023 Santiago	4×100 m relay
Ibero-American Championships
Gold medal – first place	2022 Alicante	100 m
Bronze medal – third place	2022 Alicante	200 m
World U20 Championships
Bronze medal – third place	2021 Nairobi	100 m

Shainer Reginfo Montoya (born 8 April 2002) is a Cuban sprinter. He won a gold medal in the 100 metres at the 2022 Ibero-American Championships.

== International competitions ==
Year	Competition	Venue	Position	Event	Notes
Representing Cuba
2021	World U20 Championships	Nairobi, Kenya	3rd	100 m	10.32
2021	World U20 Championships	Nairobi, Kenya	6th	200 m	21.01
2021	Junior Pan American Games (U23)	Cali, Colombia	–	200 m	DQ
2022	Ibero-American Championships	La Nucia, Spain	1st	100 m	10.15
2022	Ibero-American Championships	La Nucia, Spain	3rd	200 m	21.01
2022	Caribbean Games (U23)	Le Gosier, Guadeloupe	–	100 m	DQ
2022	World Championships	Eugene, United States	33rd (h)	100 m	10.21
2022	World Championships	Eugene, United States	39th (h)	200 m	20.80
2022	NACAC Championships	Freeport, Bahamas	6th	100 m	10.30
2023	Central American and Caribbean Games	San Salvador, El Salvador	12th (h)	100 m	10.60
2023	Central American and Caribbean Games	San Salvador, El Salvador	8th	200 m	20.97
2023	Pan American Games	Santiago, Chile	8th	100 m	10.44
2023	Pan American Games	Santiago, Chile	–	200 m	DQ
2023	Pan American Games	Santiago, Chile	2nd	4 × 100 m relay	39.26

== Personal bests ==
=== Outdoor ===
- 100 metres – 9.90 NR (+0.0 m/s, Salamanca 2024)
- 200 metres – 20.51 (+0.8 m/s, Andújar 2022)

=== Indoor ===
- 60 metres – 6.58 (Zaragoza 2023)
