= 2021 World Athletics U20 Championships – Men's 100 metres =

Men's 100 metres at the 2021 World Athletics U20 Championships
- Venue: Kasarani Stadium
- Dates: 18 August (heats and semifinals); 19 August (final)
- Competitors: 46 from 35 nations
- Winning time: 10.19

Medalists
gold medal	Letsile Tebogo	Botswana
silver medal	Benjamin Richardson	South Africa
bronze medal	Shainer Reginfo	Cuba

The men's 100 metres at the 2021 World Athletics U20 Championships was held at the Kasarani Stadium on 18 and 19 August.

== Records ==
Standing records prior to the 2021 World Athletics U20 Championships
World U20 Record	Trayvon Bromell (USA)	9.97	Eugene, United States	13 June 2014
Championship Record	Adam Gemili (GBR)	10.05	Barcelona, Spain	11 July 2012
World U20 Leading	Jaylen Slade (USA)	10.09	Clermont, United States	30 May 2021

== Results ==
=== Heats ===
Qualification: First 3 of each heat (Q) and the 6 fastest times (q) qualified for the semifinal.

Wind:
Heat 1: +0.8 m/s, Heat 2: -1.4 m/s, Heat 3: +0.7 m/s, Heat 4: +1.0 m/s, Heat 5: 0.0 m/s, Heat 6: -0.7 m/s

Rank	Heat	Name	Nationality	Time	Note
1	3	Letsile Tebogo	Botswana	10.22	Q, NU20R
2	4	Benjamin Richardson	South Africa	10.28	Q
3	1	Godson Oke Oghenebrume	Nigeria	10.35	Q
4	2	Shainer Reginfo	Cuba	10.40	Q, SB
5	6	Bryan Levell	Jamaica	10.43	Q
6	5	Oliwer Wdowik	Poland	10.44	Q, PB
7	4	Alicke Cranston	Jamaica	10.45	Q
8	5	Matteo Melluzzo	Italy	10.46	Q
9	3	Tarsis Orogot	Uganda	10.48	Q
10	6	Dominik Illovszky	Hungary	10.51	Q
11	2	Wendell Miller	Bahamas	10.51	Q, PB
12	3	Bradley Oliphant	South Africa	10.52	Q
13	6	Carlos Brown	Bahamas	10.53	Q, PB
13	2	Tomás Mondino	Argentina	10.53	Q
15	1	Almond Small	Canada	10.54	Q
16	4	Mahamat Zakaria Khalid	Qatar	10.55	Q
17	4	Angelo Ulisse	Italy	10.57	q
18	6	Ali Anwar Ali Al Balushi	Oman	10.59	q
19	5	Nazzio John	Grenada	10.59	Q
20	3	Gerardo Lomelí Ponce	Mexico	10.60	q
21	1	Yeykell Eliu Romero	Nicaragua	10.60	Q
22	4	Jayson Mandoze	Botswana	10.62	q
23	5	Bautista Diamante	Argentina	10.63	q
24	5	Eino Vuori	Finland	10.66	q
25	1	Eduard Kubelík	Czech Republic	10.66	
26	6	Sylvester Simiyu	Kenya	10.66	PB
27	6	Nikolaos Panagiotopoulos	Ukraine	10.67	
28	4	Steeven Salas	Ecuador	10.67	
29	2	Umut Uysal	Turkey	10.69	
30	4	Georgi Hristov	Bulgaria	10.72	
31	2	Katriel Angulo	Ecuador	10.75	
32	1	Falah Al-Khazaali	Iraq	10.75	
33	1	Igor Clemente Medeiros	Brazil	10.77	
34	1	Clinton Muunga	Zimbabwe	10.79	
35	2	Izaias Alves	Brazil	10.79	
36	3	Saif Al-Rammahi	Iraq	10.79	
37	5	Elvis Khikhoe Jr. Gaseb	Namibia	10.87	
38	4	Mohammed Soudd	Libya	10.95	PB
39	2	Favour Oghenetejiri Ashe	Nigeria	11.00	
40	6	Oleksandr Sosnovenko	Ukraine	11.20	
41	3	Ognjen Marsenić	Montenegro	11.23	
42	5	Sharon Loussanga	Republic of the Congo	11.37	PB
43	2	Arthur Quaqua	Liberia	11.37	PB
44	3	Maoulida Youssouf	Comoros	11.50	PB
	3	Ali Ghasem Babaei	Iran	DNF	
	5	Remigio Santander Villarubia	Equatorial Guinea	DQ	TR16.8
	6	Josué Hepburn	Honduras	DNS	

=== Semifinals ===
Qualification: First 2 of each heat (Q) and the 2 fastest times (q) qualified for the final.

Wind:
Heat 1: +0.5 m/s, Heat 2: +0.4 m/s, Heat 3: +0.8 m/s

Rank	Heat	Name	Nationality	Time	Note
1	1	Letsile Tebogo	Botswana	10.11	Q, NR
2	3	Godson Oke Oghenebrume	Nigeria	10.22	Q
3	2	Ali Anwar Ali Al Balushi	Oman	10.27	Q, NU20R
4	2	Matteo Melluzzo	Italy	10.29	Q
5	3	Shainer Reginfo	Cuba	10.29	Q, PB
6	2	Benjamin Richardson	South Africa	10.30	q
7	2	Nazzio John	Grenada	10.32	q, PB
8	3	Tarsis Orogot	Uganda	10.37	
9	1	Oliwer Wdowik	Poland	10.37	Q, PB
10	2	Eino Vuori	Finland	10.43	PB
11	2	Wendell Miller	Bahamas	10.45	PB
12	3	Carlos Brown	Bahamas	10.47	PB
13	1	Bradley Oliphant	South Africa	10.49	
14	3	Dominik Illovszky	Hungary	10.51	
15	1	Almond Small	Canada	10.53	
16	2	Tomás Mondino	Argentina	10.53	
17	3	Jayson Mandoze	Botswana	10.54	PB
18	3	Mahamat Zakaria Khalid	Qatar	10.54	
19	1	Angelo Ulisse	Italy	10.56	
20	1	Bautista Diamante	Argentina	10.59	
21	1	Yeykell Eliu Romero	Nicaragua	10.63	
22	3	Gerardo Lomelí Ponce	Mexico	10.72	
23	1	Alicke Cranston	Jamaica	10.94	
	2	Bryan Levell	Jamaica	DQ	TR16.8

=== Final ===
The final was held on 19 August at 18:27.

Wind: -0.2 m/s

Rank	Lane	Name	Nationality	Time	Note
1st place, gold medalist(s)	7	Letsile Tebogo	Botswana	10.19	
2nd place, silver medalist(s)	3	Benjamin Richardson	South Africa	10.28	
3rd place, bronze medalist(s)	9	Shainer Reginfo	Cuba	10.32	
4	5	Ali Anwar Ali Al-Balushi	Oman	10.39	
5	8	Oliwer Wdowik	Poland	10.46	
6	6	Matteo Melluzzo	Italy	10.49	
7	2	Nazzio John	Grenada	10.52	
8	4	Godson Oke Oghenebrume	Nigeria	10.74	
