= 2021 World Athletics U20 Championships – Men's shot put =

Men's shot put at the 2021 World Athletics U20 Championships
- Venue: Kasarani Stadium
- Dates: 18 August (qualification); 19 August (final)
- Competitors: 20 from 16 nations
- Winning distance: 19.73 m

Medalists
gold medal	Juan Carley Vázquez	Cuba
silver medal	Yauheni Bryhi	Belarus
bronze medal	Jephté Vogel	Switzerland

The men's shot put at the 2021 World Athletics U20 Championships was held at the Kasarani Stadium on 18 and 19 August.

== Records ==
Standing records prior to the 2021 World Athletics U20 Championships
World U20 Record	Jacko Gill (NZL)	23.00	Auckland, New Zealand	18 August 2013
Championship Record	Jacko Gill (NZL)	22.20	Barcelona, Spain	11 July 2012
World U20 Leading	Steven Richter (GER)	20.34	Mannheim, Germany	3 July 2021

== Results ==
=== Qualification ===
The qualification took place on 18 August, in two groups, with Group A starting at 09:51 and Group B starting at 10:32. Athletes attaining a mark of at least 19.20 metres ( Q ) or at least the 12 best performers ( q ) qualified for the final.

Rank	Group	Name	Nationality	Round			Mark	Notes
Rank	Group	Name	Nationality	1	2	3	Mark	Notes
1	A	Juan Carley Vázquez	Cuba	18.82	18.60	19.66	19.66	Q
2	A	Yauheni Bryhi	Belarus	19.07	19.28		19.28	Q
3	B	Semen Borodayev	Authorised Neutral Athletes	17.96	19.22		19.22	Q
4	A	Muhamet Ramadani	Kosovo	18.89	18.35	18.87	18.89	q
5	A	Arsalan Ghashghaei	Iran	17.13	18.71	x	18.71	q, PB
6	B	Kobe Lawrence	Jamaica	18.21	18.65	18.55	18.65	q
7	B	Ilya Misouski	Belarus	18.49	18.15	18.62	18.62	q
8	B	Savaş Parlak	Turkey	16.50	18.26	x	18.26	q
9	A	Jephté Vogel	Switzerland	17.96	x	18.22	18.22	q
10	B	Márk Horváth	Hungary	16.85	18.02	16.62	18.02	q
11	B	Amandeep Singh	India	17.92	17.75	17.90	17.92	q
12	A	Melih Gökalp	Turkey	17.84	x	17.19	17.84	q
13	A	DJ Liebenberg	South Africa	15.00	17.69	17.06	17.69	
14	B	Amirhossein Mamaghani	Iran	16.87	17.28	17.62	17.62	
15	B	Aiden Smith	South Africa	16.94	16.64	x	16.94	
16	A	Konstantinos Gennikis	Greece	16.92	16.48	13.07	16.92	
17	B	Karel Šula	Slovakia	16.69	16.90	x	16.90	
18	A	Konstantinos Alexiadis	Cyprus	16.48	x	16.65	16.65	
19	B	Giorgi Keinashvili	Georgia	16.02	15.76	16.48	16.48	
20	A	Dominic Kiprotich	Kenya	13.80	13.06	x	13.80	

=== Final ===
The final was held on 19 August at 16:40.

Rank	Name	Nationality	Round						Mark	Notes
Rank	Name	Nationality	1	2	3	4	5	6	Mark	Notes
1st place, gold medalist(s)	Juan Carley Vázquez	Cuba	19.47	19.68	18.92	18.85	x	19.73	19.73	
2nd place, silver medalist(s)	Yauheni Bryhi	Belarus	19.70	x	x	x	18.98	x	19.70	PB
3rd place, bronze medalist(s)	Jephté Vogel	Switzerland	19.16	16.91	17.45	x	17.52	x	19.16	
4	Arsalan Ghashghaei	Iran	17.31	19.00	18.13	17.64	18.68	18.87	19.00	PB
5	Semen Borodayev	Authorised Neutral Athletes	17.77	x	18.55	x	18.31	18.99	18.99	
6	Ilya Misouski	Belarus	18.99	x	x	17.86	18.40	18.23	18.99	
7	Muhamet Ramadani	Kosovo	18.97	x	18.41	18.39	18.26	18.94	18.97	
8	Kobe Lawrence	Jamaica	17.51	18.32	17.99	17.71	x	x	18.32	
9	Melih Gökalp	Turkey	17.76	17.66	x				17.76	
10	Savaş Parlak	Turkey	17.10	17.34	x				17.34	
11	Márk Horváth	Hungary	16.71	17.32	x				17.32	
12	Amandeep Singh	India	x	x	17.08				17.08	
