= Benjamin Richardson (sprinter) =

Irish sprinter

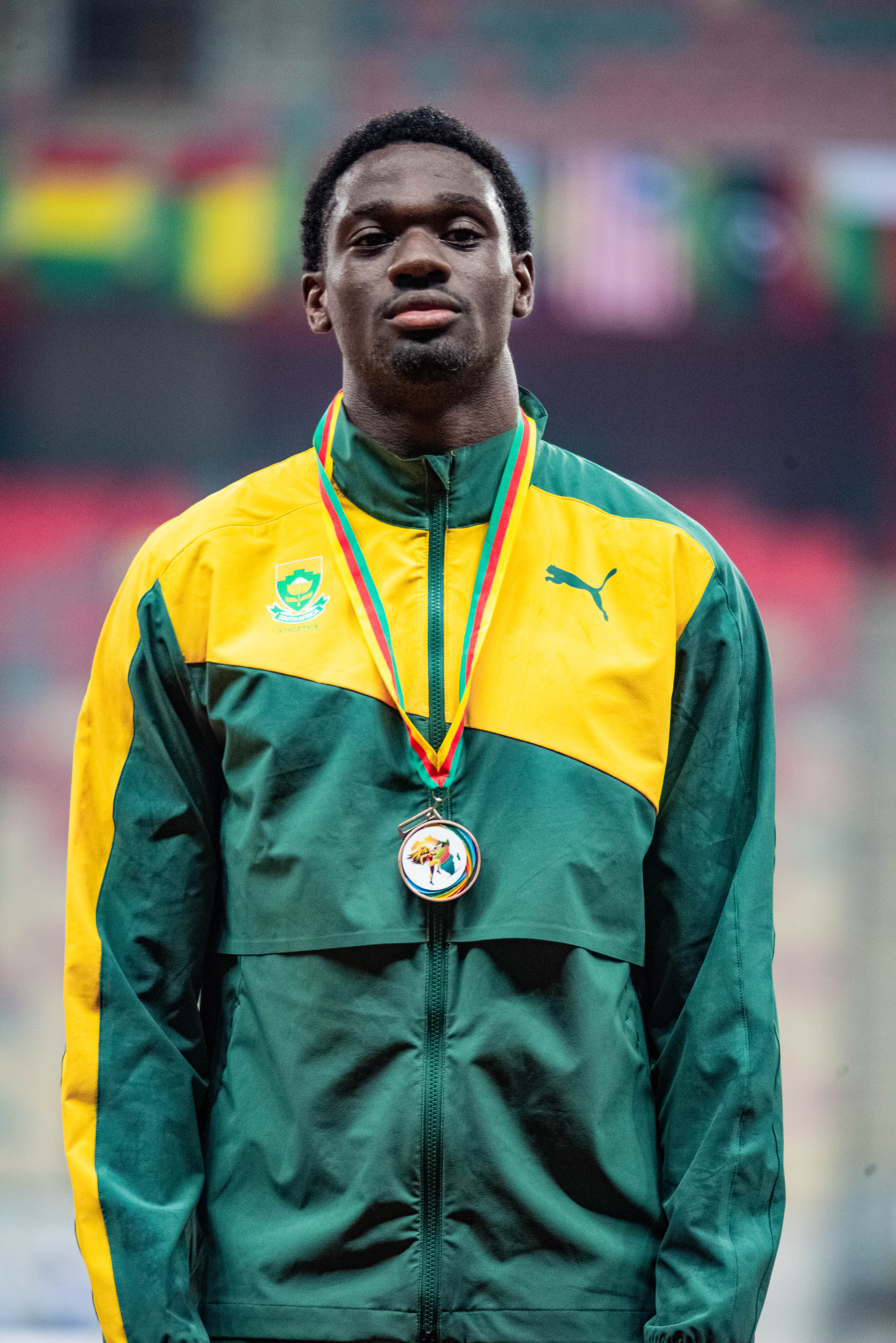
- Richardson at the 2024 African Championships

Personal information
- Born: 19 December 2003 (age 22) Waterford, Ireland
- Education: University of Pretoria
- Height: 6 ft 3 in (1.90 m)

Sport
- Country: Ireland
- Sport: Track and field
- Events: 100 m, 200 m

Achievements and titles
- Personal bests: 100 m: 9.86 (2024); 200 m: 19.99 (2024)
Medal record
Men's athletics
Representing South Africa
African Championships
| Silver medal – second place | 2022 Maurice | 4x100m |
| Bronze medal – third place | 2024 Douala | 100 m |
World U20 Championships
| Gold medal – first place | 2021 Nairobi | 4×100m |
| Silver medal – second place | 2021 Nairobi | 100 m |
| Bronze medal – third place | 2022 Cali | 100 m |

Benjamin Richardson (born 19 December 2003) is an Irish track and field athlete who competes in 100 m and 200 m sprint events. In 2025, Richardson switched his sporting allegiance from South Africa to Ireland, his country of birth.

== Early life ==
Richardson was born in Waterford, Ireland. He was adopted and raised by his Ghanaian grandparents Osam and Beatrice when he was only 3 months old, and brought-up in South Africa where Osam was a career politician, and had moved to Mbombela in 1987. Richardson attended Nelspruit Primary School, TuksSport High School, and studied at the University of Pretoria in Pretoria.

== Career ==
In 2021, he won the silver medal in the 100 metres at the 2021 World Athletics U20 Championships in Nairobi, Kenya. At the same competition he won gold as part of the South African 4 × 100 m relay team. With Mihlali Xhotyeni, Sinesipho Dambile, Letlhogonolo Moleyane, the relay team broke the world U20 record, running 38.51 seconds.

In April 2022, he lowered his personal best over 100 metres to 10.08, Gaborone. In August 2022, he won the bronze medal in the 100 metres at the 2022 World Athletics U20 Championships in Cali, Colombia.

In August 2023, he was the youngest member of the South African team selected for the 2023 World Athletics Championships in Budapest.

He ran as part of the South African 4 × 100 m relay team which qualified for the 2024 Paris Olympics at the 2024 World Relays Championships in Nassau, Bahamas. In June 2024, he won bronze in the 100 metres at the African Championships in Cameroon. He set a new 100m personal best of 9.86 seconds and a new 200m personal best of 19.99 seconds in La Chaux-de-Fonds in July 2024.

He was selected for the South African team for the 2024 Olympic Games. He competed in the 100 metres at the 2024 Paris Olympics, where he reached the semi-finals. Unfortunately, in the Paris 2024 200m heats, Richardson pulled his hamstring and had to walk the rest of the race, finishing over 30 seconds slower than his heatmates, then withdraw from the repechage round and the rest of the 2024 Olympics.

In 2025, Athletics Ireland submitted an application on behalf of Richardson to the World Athletics Nationality Review Panel to enable him to represent Ireland, the country of his birth, in international competition. That year, Richardson's seasons best in the 100 metres was 10.01 seconds, and 20.21 seconds, but he did run a wind-aided 19.79 seconds (+2.3m/s) in Geneva. Competing for Waterford AC at the Irish Athletics Championships on 25 July 2026, he won his first Irish national title, winning the 200 metres ahead of Seán Aigboboh, running 20.64 seconds (-0.1m/s). The following day, he also won the 100 metres title in a championship record time of 10.13 (1.3m/s) ahead of defending champion Bori Akinola.

== Statistics ==
Grand Slam Track results
| Slam | Race group | Event | Pl. | Time | Prize money |
|---|---|---|---|---|---|
| 2025 Miami Slam | Short sprints | 100 m | 6th | 9.99 | US$10,000 |
| 2025 Miami Slam | Short sprints | 200 m | 7th | 20.62 | US$10,000 |
