= Jerome Vega =

Puerto Rican hammer thrower

Personal information
- Full name: Jerome Ernesto Vega Llanos
- Born: 7 July 1995 (age 31)
- Height: 1.78 m (5 ft 10 in)
- Weight: 107 kg (236 lb)

Sport
- Sport: Athletics
- Event: Hammer throw
Medal record
Men's athletics
Representing Puerto Rico
NACAC Championships
Bronze medal – third place	2025 Freeport	Discus throw

Jerome Ernesto Vega Llanos (born 7 July 1995) is a Puerto Rican athlete specialising in the hammer throw. He represented his country at the 2023 World Championships without advancing to the final. His personal best in the event is 75.98 metres set in Carolina in 2024. This is the current national record. His father Santos Vega was also a hammer thrower.

== International competitions ==
Year	Competition	Venue	Position	Event	Notes
Representing Puerto Rico
2014	Central American and Caribbean; Junior Championships	Morelia, Mexico	1st	Hammer throw (6 kg)	67.04 m
2022	NACAC Championships	Freeport, Bahamas	6th	Hammer throw	70.17 m
2023	Central American and Caribbean Games	San Salvador, El Salvador	1st	Hammer throw	74.83 m
2023	World Championships	Budapest, Hungary	19th (q)	Hammer throw	72.87 m
2023	Pan American Games	Santiago, Chile	–	Hammer throw	NM
2024	Ibero-American Championships	Cuiabá, Brazil	2nd	Hammer throw	73.20 m
2024	Olympic Games	Paris, France	26th (q)	Hammer throw	71.61 m
2025	NACAC Championships	Freeport, Bahamas	3rd	Hammer throw	74.95 m
2025	World Championships	Tokyo, Japan	24th (q)	Hammer throw	73.12 m
2026	Ibero-American Championships	Lima, Peru	4th	Hammer throw	71.71 m
2026	Pan American Championships	Medellín, Colombia	7th	Hammer throw	71.61 m
2026	Central American and Caribbean Games	Santo Domingo, Dominican Republic	2nd	Hammer throw	73.88 m
