= Devin Augustine =

Trinidad and Tobago sprinter (born 2003)

Personal information
- Nationality: Trinidad and Tobago
- Born: 2 December 2003 (age 22)

Sport
- Sport: Athletics
- Event: Sprint
Medal record
Men's athletics
Representing Trinidad and Tobago
Central American and Caribbean Games
Gold medal – first place	2023 San Salvador	4 × 100 m relay

Devin Augustine (born 2 December 2003) is a sprinter from Trinidad and Tobago. In 2023, he became national champion over 100 metres.

== Early life ==
Augustine attended the University of Minnesota. In April 2024, he set a new school record over 100 metres.

== Career ==
As a 15 year-old, he won the Carifta Games Boys Under-17 100 metres final at the Truman Bodden Complex in George Town, Cayman Islands in 2019. He was named the boys’ Athlete of the Year by the NAAA (National Association of Athletic Administrations) for 2019.

He was part of the victorious men's 4 × 100 m relay team for Trinidad and Tobago at the 2023 CAC Games in July 2023. That month, he also claimed his first national title, over 100 metres, at the Hasely Crawford Stadium, Port of Spain.

Augustine ran a personal best 6.67 seconds for the 60 metres to win gold at the Gopher Classic indoor meet in Minnesota in February 2024.

In March 2024, Augustine improved his 100 metres personal best with a 10.16 seconds run at the Hurricane Invitational in Florida. In April 2024, he won the sprint double at the LSU Alumni Gold meet in Baton Rouge. He won the 100 metres in a time of 10.02 seconds, and the 200 metres in 20.98 seconds. He competed in the 100 metres at the 2024 Paris Olympics.
