= Yunisleidy García =

Cuban sprinter (born 1999)

Yunisleidy Garcia Abreu
Personal information
- Nationality: Cuban
- Born: Yunisleidy De La Caridad Garcia Abreu; 18 November 1999 (age 26)

Sport
- Sport: Athletics
- Event: Sprint

Achievements and titles
- Personal bests: 100 m: 11.08 NR (Martinique 2023); 200 m: 23.00 (Caracas, 2023)
Medal record
Women's athletics
Representing Cuba
Pan American Games
Gold medal – first place	2023 Santiago	100 m
Gold medal – first place	2023 Santiago	4 × 100 m relay
Silver medal – second place	2023 Santiago	200 m
Central American and Caribbean Games
Bronze medal – third place	2023 San Salvador	100 m

Yunisleidy De La Caridad Garcia Abreu (born 11 August 1999) is a Cuban track and field athlete who competes as a sprinter. A multiple-time national champion, she was a gold medalist at the 2023 Pan American Games over 100 metres.

== Early life ==
Garcia was born in Remedios, part of the Villa Clara Province, Cuba.

== Career ==
In August 2022, she competed at the 2022 NACAC Championships in Freeport, Bahamas where her Cuban 4 × 100 m relay team finished fifth in the final.

In May 2023, she set a new personal best of 11.16 seconds for the 100 metres. She then bettered that in the same weekend to see a new national record over 100 metres, clocking 11.08 seconds in Martinique to beat the previous record set by Liliana Allen in 1992. In July 2023, she was a bronze medalist at the Central American and Caribbean Games in San Salvador, behind winner Julien Alfred. In August 2023, she was named as part of the Cuban squad for the 2023 World Athletics Championships in Budapest.

Competing at the 2023 Pan American Games, she won gold over 100 metres, silver in the 200 metres and gold in the 4 × 100 m relay.

She ran as part of the Cuban 4 × 100 m relay team at the 2024 World Relays Championships in Nassau, Bahamas. She competed in the 100 metres at the 2024 Paris Olympics.
