= Andy Hechavarría =

Cuban athlete (born 2000)

Personal information
- Full name: Andy Eugenio Hechavarría Salazar
- Born: 14 September 2000 (age 25) Holguín, Cuba
- Height: 1.92 m (6 ft 4 in)
- Weight: 75 kg (165 lb)

Sport
- Sport: Athletics
- Event: Triple jump
Medal record
Men's athletics
Representing Cuba
NACAC Championships
Silver medal – second place	2025 Freeport	Triple jump

Andy Eugenio Hechavarría Salazar (born 14 September 2000) is a Cuban athlete specialising in the triple jump. He represented his country at the 2022 World Championships without advancing to the final.

His personal best in the event is 17.09 metres outdoors (+1.2 m/s) set in 2022 in Havana.

== International competitions ==
Year	Competition	Venue	Position	Event	Notes
Representing Cuba
2019	Pan American U20 Championships	San José, Costa Rica	2nd	Triple jump	16.33 m (w)
2021	Junior Pan American Games (U23)	Cali, Colombia	1st	Triple jump	16.77 m
2022	Caribbean Games (U23)	Asunción, Paraguay	1st	Triple jump	16.40 m
2022	World Championships	Oregon, United States	21st (q)	Triple jump	16.39 m
2023	ALBA Games	Caracas, Venezuela	2nd	Triple jump	16.69 m
2024	Ibero-American Championships	Cuiabá, Brazil	2nd	Triple jump	16.93 m
2024	Olympic Games	Paris, France	17th (q)	Triple jump	16.70 m
2025	NACAC Championships	Freeport, Bahamas	2nd	Triple jump	16.45 m
2025	World Championships	Tokyo, Japan	22 (ndq)	Triple jump	16.48 m
2026	World Indoor Championships	Toruń, Poland	12th	Triple jump	16.42 m
2026	Central American and Caribbean Games	Santo Domingo, Dominican Republic	2nd	Triple jump	16.69 m
