= Kion Benjamin =

Trinidad and Tobago sprinter (born 2000)

Personal information
- Nationality: Trinidad and Tobago
- Born: 13 November 2000 (age 25)
- Education: Minnesota Golden Gophers

Sport
- Sport: Athletics
- Event: 100 metres
Medal record
Men's athletics
Representing Trinidad and Tobago
Commonwealth Games
| Silver medal – second place | 2022 Birmingham | 4 x 100 m relay |
Central American and Caribbean Games
| Gold medal – first place | 2023 San Salvador | 4 x 100 m relay |
Caribbean Games
| Gold medal – first place | 2022 Basse-Terre | 100 metres |
NACAC U23 Championships
| Bronze medal – third place | 2021 San José | 100 m |

Kion Benjamin (born 13 November 2000) is a Trinidad and Tobago athlete. He competed in the men's 4 × 100 metres relay event at the 2020 Summer Olympics. He won the 100 m bronze medal in the 2021 NACAC U23 Championships.
