= Athletics at the 2023 Central American and Caribbean Games =

- Venue: Estadio Jorge "El Mágico" González
- Location: (El Salvador) San Salvador
- Dates: 2–8 July
- Competitors: 400 from 30 nations

The athletics competition at the 2023 Central American and Caribbean Games was held in San Salvador, El Salvador from 2 to 8 July at the Estadio Jorge "El Mágico" González (road events in an urban circuit).

== Medal summary ==
=== Men's events ===
Event	Gold		Silver		Bronze	
100 m	Emanuel Archibald; Guyana	10.24	José González; Dominican Republic	10.26	Rikkoi Brathwaite; British Virgin Islands	10.26
200 m	Alexander Ogando; Dominican Republic	19.99	Carlos Palacios; Colombia	20.37	Alonso Edward; Panama	20.46
400 m	Jereem Richards; Trinidad and Tobago	44.54	Michael Joseph; Saint Lucia	44.90	Gilles Biron; Martinique	45.06
800 m	Handal Roban; Saint Vincent and the Grenadines	1:45.93 NR	Ryan Sánchez; Puerto Rico	1:46.86	Ferdy Agramonte; Dominican Republic	1:47.46
1500 m	Fernando Martinez; Mexico	3:43.47	Robert Napolitano; Puerto Rico	3:43.86	Dage Minors; Bermuda	3:45.12
5000 m	Héctor Pagán Ortíz; Puerto Rico	14:07.17	Diego García; Mexico	14:11.12	Carlos San Martín; Colombia	14:14.08
10,000 m	Víctor Zambrano; Mexico	29:39.30	Iván Darío González; Colombia	29:40.71	Mario Pacay; Centro Caribe Sports	29:43.97
110 m hurdles	Shane Brathwaite; Barbados	13.64	Rasheem Brown; Cayman Islands	13.64	Jeanice Laviolette; Guadeloupe	13.82
400 m hurdles	Pablo Andrés Ibáñez; El Salvador	49.34	Guillermo Campos; Mexico	49.55	Juander Santos; Dominican Republic	49.61
3000 m steeplechase	Carlos San Martín; Colombia	8:50.15	César Gómez; Mexico	8:50.68	Carlos Santos; El Salvador	8:51.92
4 × 100 m relay	Trinidad and Tobago; Kion Benjamin; Devin Augustine; Carlon Hosten; Eric Harrison Jr	38.30	Dominican Republic; Erick Sanchez; Yancarlos Martinez; Christopher Valdez; José González	38.61	Venezuela; Alexis Nieves; David Vivas; Bryant Alamo; Rafael Vasquez	39.13
4 × 400 m relay	Trinidad and Tobago; Renny Quow; Che Lara; Machel Cedenio; Jereem Richards	3:01.99	Barbados; Kyle Gale; Rasheeme Griffith; Rivaldo Leacock; Desean Boyce	3:02.12	Dominican Republic; Ezequiel Suárez; Juander Santos; Robert King; Lidio Feliz	3:02.19
Half marathon	Alberto González; Centro Caribe Sports	1:03:50 GR	José González; Colombia	1:04:23	Juan Luis Barrios; Mexico	1:05:13
20 km walk	José Luis Doctor; Mexico	1:22:35	César Herrera; Colombia	1:22:37	Noel Chama; Mexico	1:23:09
High jump	Luis Castro; Puerto Rico	2.25 m	Luis Zayas; Cuba	2.25 m	Shaun Miller Jr. Bahamas	2.22 m
Pole vault	Jorge Luna; Mexico	5.40 m	Victor Castillero; Mexico	5.30 m	José Tomás Nieto; Colombia	5.30 m
Long jump	Alejandro Parada; Cuba	7.88 m	Jordan Yates Turner; Jamaica	7.65 m	Tristan James; Dominica	7.65 m
Triple jump	Lázaro Martínez; Cuba	17.51 m GR	Cristian Nápoles; Cuba	17.11 m	Leodan Torre; Venezuela	16.41 m
Shot put	Uziel Muñoz; Mexico	20.81 m	Jairo Moran; Mexico	19.18 m	Djimon Gumbs; British Virgin Islands	19.00 m
Discus throw	Mario Díaz; Cuba	62.57 m	Mauricio Ortega; Colombia	61.67 m	Jorge Fernández; Cuba	59.97 m
Hammer throw	Jerome Vega; Puerto Rico	74.83 m	Diego del Real; Mexico	74.57 m	Miguel Zamora; Cuba	72.63 m
Javelin throw	Keshorn Walcott; Trinidad and Tobago	83.60 m	David Carreon; Mexico	78.03 m	Elvis Graham; Jamaica	76.43 m
Decathlon	Ayden Owens-Delerme; Puerto Rico	8281 pts GR	Ken Mullings; Bahamas	8060 pts	Yariel Soto; Puerto Rico	7762 pts
Decathlon	Ayden Owens-Delerme; Puerto Rico	8281 pts GR	Ken Mullings; Bahamas	8060 pts	José Paulino; Dominican Republic	7762 pts

=== Women's events ===
Event	Gold		Silver		Bronze	
100 m	Julien Alfred; Saint Lucia	11.14 =GR	Yanique Dayle; Jamaica	11.39	Yunisleidy García; Cuba	11.50
200 m	Yanique Dayle; Jamaica	22.80	Yunisleidy García; Cuba	23.05	Fiordaliza Cofil; Dominican Republic	23.07
400 m	Marileidy Paulino; Dominican Republic	49.95 GR	Roxana Gómez; Cuba	51.23	Gabriella Scott; Puerto Rico	51.51
800 m	Rose Mary Almanza; Cuba	2:01.75	Sahily Diago; Cuba	2:02.81	Shafiqua Maloney; Saint Vincent and the Grenadines	2:04.98
1500 m	Joselyn Brea; Venezuela	4:10.39 GR	Sahily Diago; Cuba	4:11.07	Daily Cooper Gaspar; Cuba	4:11.25
5000 m	Joselyn Brea; Venezuela	15:10.60	Laura Galván; Mexico	15:12.61	Alma Cortés; Mexico	15:59.21
10,000 m	Laura Galván; Mexico	33:12.28	Viviana Aroche; Centro Caribe Sports	29:43.97	Citlali Cristian; Mexico	33:40.43
100 m hurdles	Jasmine Camacho-Quinn; Puerto Rico	12.61	Greisys Roble; Cuba	12.94	Andrea Vargas; Costa Rica	13.02
400 m hurdles	Zurian Hechavarría; Cuba	55.52	Gianna Woodruff; Panama	56.15	Daniela Rojas; Costa Rica	56.58
3000 m steeplechase	Alondra Negron Texidor; Puerto Rico	10:14.34	Arian Chia; Mexico	10:24.04	Stefany López; Colombia	10:27.20
4 × 100 m relay	Cuba; Yarima Garcia; Yunisleidy Garcia; Laura Moreira; Enis Perez	43.17	Trinidad and Tobago; Reyare Thomas; Sanaa Frederick; Akilah Lewis; Leah Bertrand	43.43	Dominican Republic; Darianny Jiménez; Liranyi Alonso; Anabel Medina; Marileidy Paulino	43.45
4 × 400 m relay	Cuba; Zurian Hechavarria; Rose Almanza; Lisneidy Veitia; Roxana Gomez	3:26.08 GR	Dominican Republic; Mariana Pérez; Anabel Medina; Franshina Martinez; Marileidy Paulino	3:27.84 NR	Colombia; Lina Licona; Melany Bolaño; Valeria Cabezas; Evelis Aguilar	3:31.16
Half marathon	Joselyn Brea; Venezuela	1:15:04	Margarita Hernández; Mexico	1:15:10	Angie Orjuela; Colombia	1:15:19
20 km walk	Alejandra Ortega; Mexico	1:35:43	María Peinado; Centro Caribe Sports	1:35:59	Maritza Poncio; Centro Caribe Sports	1:36:25
High jump	Marysabel Senyu; Dominican Republic	1.86 m	Glenka Antonia; Curaçao	1.84 m	Dacsy Brison; Cuba	1.81 m
High jump	Marysabel Senyu; Dominican Republic	1.86 m	Glenka Antonia; Curaçao	1.84 m	Marys Patterson; Cuba	1.81 m
Pole vault	Robeilys Peinado; Venezuela	4.60 m	Aslin Quiala; Cuba	4.30 m	None awarded	
Pole vault	Robeilys Peinado; Venezuela	4.60 m	Katherine Castillo; Colombia	4.30 m	None awarded	
Long jump	Natalia Linares; Colombia	6.86 m GR	Leyanis Pérez; Cuba	6.65 m	Alysbeth Félix; Puerto Rico	6.44 m
Triple jump	Yulimar Rojas; Venezuela	15.16 m GR	Leyanis Pérez; Cuba	14.98 m	Liadagmis Povea; Cuba	14.85 m
Shot put	Rosa Ramirez; Dominican Republic	17.89 m	Danielle Sloley; Jamaica	16.81 m	Layselis Jimenez; Cuba	16.79 m
Discus throw	Silinda Morales; Cuba	61.95 m	Alma Pollorena; Mexico	55.58 m	Adrienne Adams; Jamaica	55.43 m
Hammer throw	Rosa Rodríguez; Venezuela	71.62 m GR	Erica Belvit; Jamaica	70.04 m	Mayra Gaviria; Colombia	68.61 m PB
Javelin throw	Flor Ruiz; Colombia	60.52 m	María Lucelly Murillo; Colombia	58.92 m	Luz Castro; Mexico	57.50 m
Heptathlon	Marys Patterson; Cuba	5978 pts	Martha Araújo; Colombia	5960 pts	Alysbeth Félix; Puerto Rico	5860 pts

=== Mixed event ===
Event	Gold		Silver		Bronze	
4 × 400 m relay	Dominican Republic; Alexander Ogando; Lidio Andrés Feliz; Marileidy Paulino; Fiordaliza Cofil; Franshina Martínez; Anabel Medina; Mariana Pérez	3:14.81	Cuba; Leonardo Castillo; Roxana Gómez; Yoandys Lescay; Lisneidy Veitía; Rose Mary Almanza	3:16.97	Colombia; Lina Licona; Raúl Mena; Gustavo Barrios; Evelis Aguilar; Valeria Cabezas; Jhonatan Rodríguez	3:20.36

== Medal table ==
* Host nation (El Salvador)

Rank	Nation	Gold	Silver	Bronze	Total
1	Cuba (CUB)	9	11	8	28
2	Mexico (MEX)	7	11	5	23
3	Puerto Rico (PUR)	6	2	4	12
4	Venezuela (VEN)	6	0	2	8
5	Dominican Republic (DOM)	5	3	6	14
6	Trinidad and Tobago (TTO)	4	1	0	5
7	Colombia (COL)	3	8	7	18
8	Jamaica (JAM)	1	4	2	7
9	Centro Caribe Sports (CCS)	1	2	2	5
10	Barbados (BAR)	1	1	0	2
10	Saint Lucia (LCA)	1	1	0	2
12	El Salvador (ESA)*	1	0	1	2
12	Saint Vincent and the Grenadines (VIN)	1	0	1	2
14	Guyana (GUY)	1	0	0	1
15	Bahamas (BAH)	0	1	1	2
15	Panama (PAN)	0	1	1	2
17	Cayman Islands (CAY)	0	1	0	1
17	Curaçao (CUW)	0	1	0	1
19	British Virgin Islands (IVB)	0	0	2	2
19	Costa Rica (CRC)	0	0	2	2
21	Bermuda (BER)	0	0	1	1
21	Dominica (DMA)	0	0	1	1
21	Guadeloupe (GLP)	0	0	1	1
21	Martinique (MTQ)	0	0	1	1
Totals (24 entries)		47	48	48	143

== Participating nations ==
- Antigua and Barbuda (2)
- Barbados (11)
- Bermuda (3)
- British Virgin Islands (7)
- Cayman Islands (2)
- Colombia (36)
- Centro Caribe Sports (12)
- Costa Rica (15)
- Cuba (53)
- Curaçao (3)
- Dominica (3)
- Dominican Republic (33)
- Grenada (3)
- Guadeloupe (2)
- Guyana (14)
- Honduras (1)
- Jamaica (15)
- Martinique (2)
- Mexico (37)
- Nicaragua (2)
- Panama (10)
- Puerto Rico (30)
- Saint Kitts and Nevis (2)
- Saint Lucia (7)
- Saint Vincent and the Grenadines (3)
- El Salvador (24)
- Trinidad and Tobago (22)
- Turks and Caicos Islands (2)
- United States Virgin Islands (6)
- Venezuela (38)
