= Margarita Hernández =

Mexican long-distance runner

Personal information
- Full name: Margarita Hernández Flores
- Born: 3 December 1985 (age 40) Toluca de Lerdo, Mexico
- Height: 1.49 m (4 ft 11 in)

Sport
- Country: Mexico
- Sport: Track and field
- Event: Marathon
Medal record
Central American and Caribbean Games
Gold medal – first place	2014 Veracruz	Marathon

Margarita Hernández Flores (Note: In this Spanish name, the first or paternal surname is Hernández and the second or maternal family name is Flores.) (born 3 December 1985) is a Mexican long-distance runner who specialises in the marathon. She competed in the women's marathon at the 2016 and 2024 Olympics.
