= Leah Bertrand =

Trinidad and Tobago athlete (born 2002)

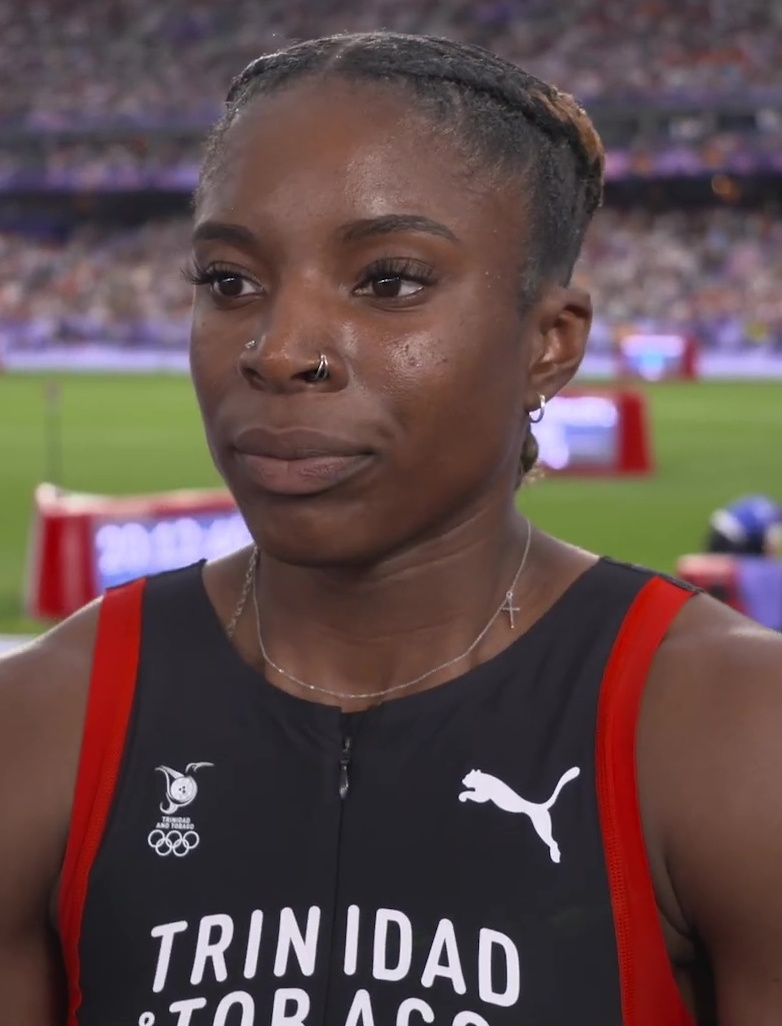

Personal information
- Nationality: Trinidad and Tobago
- Born: 26 July 2002 (age 24)

Sport
- Sport: Athletics
- Event: Sprint

Achievements and titles
- Personal bests: 60 m: 7.19 (Indianapolis, 2025); 100 m: 11.08 (Bloomington, 2023); 200 m: 22.98 (Ann Arbor, 2024)
Medal record
Women's athletics
Representing Trinidad and Tobago
Commonwealth Games
Bronze medal – third place	2026 Glasgow	4×100m relay
Central American and Caribbean Games
Silver medal – second place	2023 San Salvador	4 × 100 m relay
NACAC U23 Championships
Silver medal – second place	2023 San Jose	100 m
Bronze medal – third place	2023 San Jose	4 × 100 m

Leah Bertrand (born 26 July 2002) is a sprinter from Trinidad and Tobago. She has represented her country at multiple major championships, including the 2024 Olympic Games.

== Biography ==
Bertrand was a silver medalist in the 100 metres at the NACAC U20 Championships in San Jose, Costa Rica in 2021. She reached the semi finals of the 100 metres at the 2021 World Athletics U20 Championships in Nairobi.

Bertrand became national champion over 100 metres in June 2022 in Port-of-Spain. She won the gold medal in the U23 Caribbean Games in the 4 × 100 m relay in Guadeloupe. She represented Trinidad and Tobago at the 2022 Commonwealth Games.

Bertrand ran a personal best 11.08 seconds on her way to winning the Big Ten Championships in Bloomington, Indiana in May 2023. She was a silver medalist at the 2023 U23 NACAC Championships in Costa Rica over 100 metres. She was a bronze medalist in the 4 × 100 m relay at the same championships. She competed in the 100 metres for Trinidad and Tobago at the 2023 World Athletics Championships in Budapest.

Competing for the Ohio State Buckeyes track and field team, Bertrand ran a wind-assisted 11.05 seconds for the 100 metres to finish seventh at the 2024 NCAA Division I Outdoor Track and Field Championships final in Eugene, Oregon.

Bertrand competed in the 100 metres at the 2024 Paris Olympics, reaching the semi-finals. She also competed in the 4 × 100 m relay at the Games.

Bertrand finished third in the 60 meters at the Big 10 Indoor Championships on 1 March 2025 in 7.19 seconds. In 2025 at the Texas Relays, she ran a wind assisted 10.94 in the women's 100 meters (+3.9). She finished fourth in the 200 metres at the 2025 NCAA Division I Outdoor Track and Field Championships. She also finished fifth in the NCAA Outdoor Championships final over 100 metres in a time of 11.21 seconds. At the Trinidad & Tobago Championships in August 2025, she won the 100 metres title ahead of Shaniqua Bascombe in the final.

In September 2025, she competed in the 100 metres at the 2025 World Championships in Tokyo, Japan. She also ran in the women's 200 metres at the championships.

In June 2026, Bertrand won the national championships sprint double with wins over 100 metres and 200 metres. In July, she was a semi-finalist competing in the 100 metres at the 2026 Commonwealth Games. On 1 August, she won the bronze medal at the Games in Glasgow, Scotland, in the women's 4 × 100 m relay.
