= Greisys Roble =

Cuban hurdler

Greisys Lázara Roble
Personal information
- Born: 18 January 2000 (age 26)

Sport
- Sport: Athletics
- Event: 100 metres hurdles
Medal record
Representing Cuba
Pan American Games
Silver medal – second place	2023 Santiago	100 m hurdles
Central American and Caribbean Games
Silver medal – second place	2023 San Salvador	100 m hurdles
Silver medal – second place	2026 San Domingo	100 m hurdles
Junior Pan American Games
Gold medal – first place	2021 Cali-Valle	100 m hurdles

Greisys Lázara Roble (born 18 January 2000) is a Cuban hurdler who specialises in the 100 metres hurdles.

== Biography ==
Roble was a gold medalist in the 100 metres hurdles at the 2021 Junior Pan American Games in Cali, Colombia. The following year, she won the gold wide at the 2022 Ibero-American Athletics Championships in Alicante, Spain.

She was a silver medalist in the 100 metres hurdles at the 2023 Pan American Games in Santiago, Chile.

She set a new personal best of 12.91 seconds for the 100m hurdles in February 2025. She lowered her personal best to 12.81 seconds for the 100 metres hurdles in March 2025. She lowered it to 12.71 seconds to win the Cuban Championships in June 2025. She equalled that time again the following month whilst competing in Finland, her tenth time under 13 seconds since February that year.

She competed for Cuba at the 2025 World Athletics Championships in Tokyo, Japan, running 12.84 seconds to come through her qualifying heat, before running 12.97 seconds to place fourth in her semi-final.

In March 2026, she ran in the 60 metres hurdles at the 2026 World Athletics Indoor Championships in Toruń, Poland. In August, she won the silver medal in the 100 metres hurdles at the 2026 CAC Games in Santo Domingo, Dominican Republic.

== Personal life ==
She is from Mayabeque Province.
