= Juan Carley Vázquez =

Cuban shot putter

Personal information
- Full name: Juan Carley Vázquez Gómez
- National team: Cuba
- Born: 13 February 2002 (age 24)

Sport
- Country: Cuba
- Sport: Athletics
- Event: Shot put

Achievements and titles
- Personal bests: Outdoor: 17.60 m (2021); Outdoor 6kg: 20.32 m (2020) NU20R
Medal record
Men's athletics
Representing Cuba
NACAC Championships
Bronze medal – third place	2025 Freeport	Shot put
World U20 Championships
Gold medal – first place	2021 Nairobi	Shot put

Juan Carley Vázquez Gómez (Note: In this Spanish name, the first or paternal surname is Vázquez and the second or maternal family name is Gómez.) (born 13 February 2002) is a Cuban athlete who specializes in the shot put. He was the gold medallist at the World Athletics U20 Championships in 2021.
