= Handal Roban =

St Vincent and the Grenadines athlete

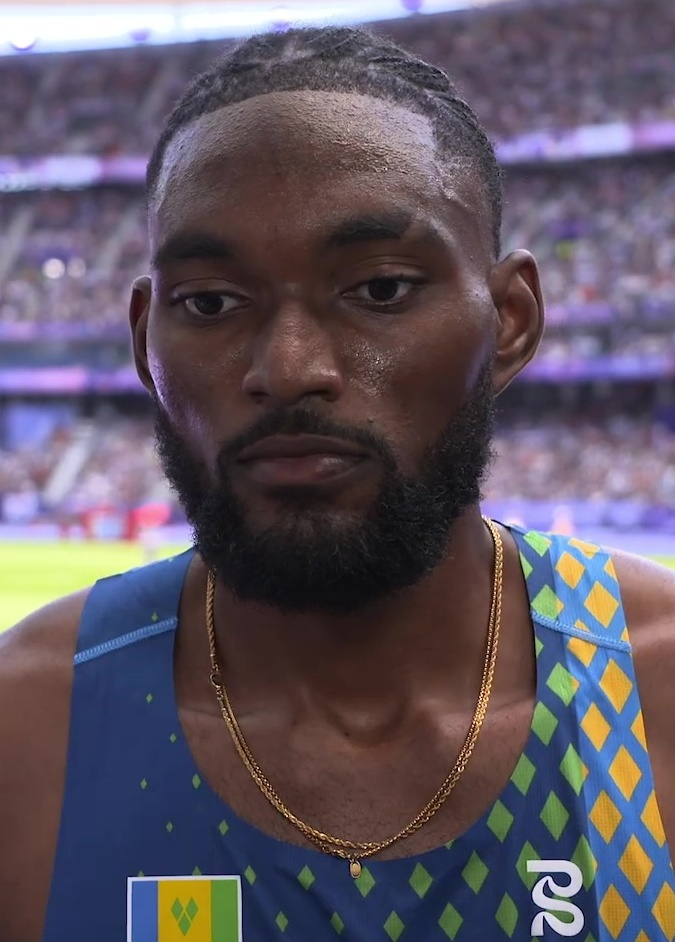

Personal information
- Born: 5 September 2002 (age 24)
- Height: 6'0

Sport
- Sport: Athletics
- Event: Middle distance running

Achievements and titles
- Personal bests: 800m: 1:42.87 (Freeport, 2025) NR
Medal record
Athletics
Representing Saint Vincent and the Grenadines
NACAC Championships
Gold medal – first place	2025 Freeport	800 m
Silver medal – second place	2022 Freeport	800 m
Central American and Caribbean Games
Gold medal – first place	2023 San Salvador	800 m
NACAC U-23 Championships
Gold medal – first place	2023 San Jose	800 meters

Handal Roban (born 5 September 2002) is a middle distance runner from Saint Vincent and the Grenadines. He won the gold medal at the 2025 NACAC Championships and competed at the 2024 Summer Olympics and 2025 World Championships over 800 metres.

== Early life ==
He attended Jamaica College, and Penn State University in the United States. He was a gold and bronze medallist at the Junior Carifta Games in 2018. Roban was a bronze medallist at the 2019 North American, Central American and Caribbean Athletics Association (NACAC) Under-18 Championships in Mexico.

== Career ==
He won a silver medal at the 2022 NACAC Championships in Freeport, Bahamas over 800 metres. He competed at the 2022 Commonwealth Games in Birmingham, England in the 800 metres.

In June 2023, he lowered the national record for the 800 metres to 1:45.95 whilst running at the NCAA final in Austin, Texas in 2023. He won the gold medal over 800 metres at the 2023 NACAC U23 Championships in San Jose, Costa Rica. He won the gold medal in the 800 metres at the 2023 Central American and Caribbean Games in San Salvador in July 2023. He competed in the 800 metres at the 2023 World Athletics Championships in Budapest.

He competed in the 800 metres at the 2024 Summer Olympics in Paris in August 2024.

In April 2025, Roban set a new Saint Vincent and the Grenadines national record in the 800m, running 1:45.16 at the Florida Relays. He lowered that record in June to 1:45.05 at the Portland Track Festival.

Roban won the gold medal in the 800 metres at the 2025 NACAC Championships in Freeport, The Bahamas in a new national record 1:42.87, which also broke the championship record held previously by Ryan Martin. It was the first gold medal ever won by St Vincent and the Grenadines at the event. He competed at the 2025 World Athletics Championships in Tokyo, Japan, in September 2025 in the men's 800 metres.

Competing indoors for Penn State University in Winston-Salem, North Carolina, on 14 February 2026 Roban finished second behind Cooper Lutkenhaus in 1:44.73, only .03 off the collegiate record set by Northern Arizona’s Colin Sahlman earlier that month. He was a semi-finalist in the 800 m at the 2026 World Athletics Indoor Championships in Toruń, Poland in March 2026. In June, he placed second to Brandon Miller at the LA Grand Prix in 1:45.32. He was a semi-finalist in the 800 metres at the 2026 Commonwealth Games in Glasgow, Scotland. In September, he competed over 800 m at the inaugural World Ultimate Championship in Budapest.

== See also ==
- List of Pennsylvania State University Olympians
