= 2012 Ibero-American Championships in Athletics – Results =

These are the official results of the 2012 Ibero-American Championships in Athletics, held from June 8–10, 2012 in Barquisimeto, Venezuela.

== Men's results ==
=== 100 meters ===
Heats – June 8
Wind:
Heat 1: -0.0 m/s, Heat 2: -1.1 m/s, Heat 3: -0.2 m/s

| Rank | Heat | Name | Nationality | Time | Notes |
|---|---|---|---|---|---|
| 1 | 3 | Álex Quiñónez | Ecuador | 10.57 | Q |
| 2 | 2 | Sandro Viana | Brazil | 10.62 | Q |
| 3 | 1 | Daniel Grueso | Colombia | 10.63 | Q |
| 3 | 3 | Carlos de Moraes Jr. | Brazil | 10.63 | Q |
| 5 | 3 | Mateo Edward | Panama | 10.67 | q |
| 6 | 2 | Carlos Rodríguez | Puerto Rico | 10.69 | Q |
| 7 | 2 | Diego Rivas | Venezuela | 10.75 | q |
| 8 | 3 | Geronimo Goeloe | Aruba | 10.76 | |
| 9 | 1 | Jermaine Chirinos | Venezuela | 10.83 | Q |
| 10 | 2 | Fernando Matamoros | Mexico | 10.84 | |
| 11 | 1 | Franklin Nazareno | Ecuador | 10.88 | |
| 11 | 3 | Cristian Leguizamón | Paraguay | 10.88 | |
| 13 | 1 | Arthur Rojas | Bolivia | 10.93 | |
| 14 | 1 | Andy Martínez | Peru | 10.95 | |
| 15 | 2 | Josef Norales | Honduras | 11.15 | |
| | 2 | Michel Mary | Uruguay | DNS | |
| | 3 | José Véliz | Nicaragua | DNS | |

Final – June 8
Wind:
-0.2 m/s

| Rank | Name | Nationality | Time | Notes |
|---|---|---|---|---|
| 1st place, gold medalist(s) | Álex Quiñónez | Ecuador | 10.34 | PB |
| 2nd place, silver medalist(s) | Sandro Viana | Brazil | 10.42 | |
| 3rd place, bronze medalist(s) | Carlos Rodríguez | Puerto Rico | 10.60 | |
| 4 | Mateo Edward | Panama | 10.62 | SB |
| 5 | Daniel Grueso | Colombia | 10.63 | SB |
| 6 | Carlos de Moraes Jr. | Brazil | 10.66 | |
| 7 | Diego Rivas | Venezuela | 10.66 | SB |
| 8 | Jermaine Chirinos | Venezuela | 10.67 | |

=== 200 meters ===
Heats – June 9
Wind:
Heat 1: -1.0 m/s, Heat 2: -1.4 m/s, Heat 3: +2.5 m/s

| Rank | Heat | Name | Nationality | Time | Notes |
|---|---|---|---|---|---|
| 1 | 2 | Sandro Viana | Brazil | 20.60 | Q |
| 2 | 1 | Aldemir da Silva | Brazil | 20.63 | Q |
| 2 | 2 | Álex Quiñónez | Ecuador | 20.63 | Q |
| 4 | 3 | José Acevedo | Venezuela | 20.73 | Q |
| 5 | 3 | Michael Herrera | Cuba | 20.97 | Q |
| 6 | 2 | Miguel López | Puerto Rico | 20.98 | q |
| 7 | 1 | José Carlos Herrera | Mexico | 21.05 | Q |
| 8 | 3 | Daniel Grueso | Colombia | 21.16 | q |
| 9 | 3 | Gustavo Cuesta | Dominican Republic | 21.19 | |
| 10 | 3 | Andrés Rodríguez | Panama | 21.19 | |
| 11 | 2 | Cristián Reyes | Chile | 21.20 | |
| 12 | 1 | Bernardo Baloyez | Colombia | 21.21 | |
| 13 | 2 | Michel Mary | Uruguay | 21.23 | |
| 13 | 3 | Carlos Rodriguez | Puerto Rico | 21.23 | |
| 15 | 1 | Geronimo Goeloe | Aruba | 21.37 | |
| 16 | 2 | Arthur Rojas | Bolivia | 21.65 | |
| 17 | 1 | Wuilmer Valor | Venezuela | 21.70 | |
| 18 | 2 | Fernando Matamoros | Mexico | 21.72 | |
| 19 | 1 | Franklin Nazareno | Ecuador | 21.77 | |
| 20 | 2 | Cristian Leguizamón | Paraguay | 22.00 | |
| 21 | 3 | Andy Martínez | Peru | 22.14 | |
| 21 | 1 | Augusto Stanley | Paraguay | 22.24 | |
| 22 | 1 | José Véliz | Nicaragua | 22.53 | |
| | 3 | Josef Norales | Honduras | DNS | |

Final – June 9
Wind:
-0.9 m/s

| Rank | Name | Nationality | Time | Notes |
|---|---|---|---|---|
| 1st place, gold medalist(s) | Álex Quiñónez | Ecuador | 20.34 | NR |
| 2nd place, silver medalist(s) | Aldemir da Silva | Brazil | 20.57 | |
| 3rd place, bronze medalist(s) | Sandro Viana | Brazil | 20.69 | |
| 4 | José Acevedo | Venezuela | 20.76 | SB |
| 5 | Michael Herrera | Cuba | 20.78 | SB |
| 6 | Miguel López | Puerto Rico | 21.04 | |
| 7 | José Carlos Herrera | Mexico | 21.09 | |
| | Daniel Grueso | Colombia | DNS | |

=== 400 meters ===
Heats – June 8

| Rank | Heat | Name | Nationality | Time | Notes |
|---|---|---|---|---|---|
| 1 | 1 | Albert Bravo | Venezuela | 45.72 | Q, PB |
| 2 | 2 | William Collazo | Cuba | 46.10 | Q |
| 3 | 2 | Arturo Ramírez | Venezuela | 46.21 | Q |
| 4 | 1 | Jhonathan da Silva | Brazil | 46.45 | Q |
| 5 | 1 | Noel Ruíz | Cuba | 46.49 | Q, SB |
| 6 | 2 | Anderson Henriques | Brazil | 46.51 | Q |
| 7 | 2 | Diego Palomeque | Colombia | 46.55 | q |
| 8 | 2 | Yon Soriano | Dominican Republic | 46.57 | q, SB |
| 9 | 1 | Augusto Stanley | Paraguay | 46.62 | NR |
| 10 | 1 | Gustavo Cuesta | Dominican Republic | 47.24 | |
| 11 | 1 | Lenin Flores | Ecuador | 47.92 | |
| 12 | 2 | Kessel Campbell | Honduras | 49.75 | |
| | 1 | Takeshi Fujiwara | El Salvador | DNS | |
| | 2 | Emerson Chala | Ecuador | DNS | |

Final – June 8

| Rank | Name | Nationality | Time | Notes |
|---|---|---|---|---|
| 1st place, gold medalist(s) | Anderson Henriques | Brazil | 45.59 | PB |
| 2nd place, silver medalist(s) | William Collazo | Cuba | 45.81 | SB |
| 3rd place, bronze medalist(s) | Arturo Ramírez | Venezuela | 45.84 | PB |
| 4 | Albert Bravo | Venezuela | 45.99 | |
| 5 | Diego Palomeque | Colombia | 46.52 | |
| 6 | Yon Soriano | Dominican Republic | 46.98 | |
| 7 | Jhonathan da Silva | Brazil | 47.48 | |
| | Noel Ruíz | Cuba | DQ | |

=== 800 meters ===
June 9

| Rank | Name | Nationality | Time | Notes |
|---|---|---|---|---|
| 1st place, gold medalist(s) | Andy González | Cuba | 1:46.91 | |
| 2nd place, silver medalist(s) | Fabiano Peçanha | Brazil | 1:47.16 | |
| 3rd place, bronze medalist(s) | Tayron Reyes | Dominican Republic | 1:48.03 | NR |
| 4 | José Veras | Dominican Republic | 1:49.21 | PB |
| 5 | Lucirio Antonio Garrido | Venezuela | 1:50.14 | SB |
| 6 | Manuel António | Angola | 1:50.45 | PB |
| 7 | Edgar Cortez | Nicaragua | 1:51.55 | SB |
| 8 | Wilfredo Borotoche | Venezuela | 1:54.43 | |

=== 1500 meters ===
June 10

| Rank | Name | Nationality | Time | Notes |
|---|---|---|---|---|
| 1st place, gold medalist(s) | Leandro de Oliveira | Brazil | 3:47.76 | |
| 2nd place, silver medalist(s) | Alberto Imedio | Spain | 3:48.46 | |
| 3rd place, bronze medalist(s) | Carlos Díaz | Chile | 3:48.50 | |
| 4 | Iván López | Chile | 3:48.95 | |
| 5 | Eduar Villanueva | Venezuela | 3:49.17 | |
| 6 | Fabiano Peçanha | Brazil | 3:50.33 | |
| 7 | Flavio Seholhe | Mozambique | 3:50.39 | |
| 8 | Alexis Peña | Venezuela | 3:51.82 | |
| 9 | Freddy Espinoza | Colombia | 3:53.86 | |
| 10 | Manuel António | Angola | 3:54.17 | |
| 11 | Álvaro Abreu | Dominican Republic | 3:54.68 | |
| 12 | Derlis Ramón Ayala | Paraguay | 3:54.97 | |
| 13 | Iván Darío González | Colombia | 3:56.88 | |
| | Tayron Reyes | Dominican Republic | DNF | |

=== 3000 meters ===
June 9

| Rank | Name | Nationality | Time | Notes |
|---|---|---|---|---|
| 1st place, gold medalist(s) | Víctor Aravena | Chile | 8:04.45 | SB |
| 2nd place, silver medalist(s) | Leslie Encina | Chile | 8:04.98 | |
| 3rd place, bronze medalist(s) | Flavio Seholhe | Mozambique | 8:05.64 | NR |
| 4 | Carlos dos Santos | Brazil | 8:08.22 | |
| 5 | Iván Darío González | Colombia | 8:17.41 | PB |
| 6 | Ederson Pereira | Brazil | 8:19.59 | |
| 7 | Nico Herrera | Venezuela | 8:26.10 | |
| 8 | Alexis Peña | Venezuela | 8:47.87 | |
| | Mariano Mastromarino | Argentina | DNS | |

=== 5000 meters ===
June 9

| Rank | Name | Nationality | Time | Notes |
|---|---|---|---|---|
| 1st place, gold medalist(s) | Marvin Blanco | Venezuela | 14:19.89 | PB |
| 2nd place, silver medalist(s) | Javier Carriqueo | Argentina | 14:22.12 | SB |
| 3rd place, bronze medalist(s) | Escobedo Vega | Mexico | 14:23.36 | |
| 4 | Gilberto Lopes | Brazil | 14:30.42 | |
| | Lervis Arias | Venezuela | DNS | |
| | Paulo Buenaño | Ecuador | DNS | |

=== 110 meters hurdles ===
Heats – June 9
Wind:
Heat 1:-4.8 m/s, Heat 2: -2.2 m/s

| Rank | Heat | Name | Nationality | Time | Notes |
|---|---|---|---|---|---|
| 1 | 2 | Ignacio Morales | Cuba | 13.74 | Q |
| 2 | 1 | Paulo Villar | Colombia | 13.96 | Q |
| 3 | 2 | Francisco Javier López | Spain | 14.03 | Q |
| 4 | 2 | Héctor Cotto | Puerto Rico | 14.04 | Q |
| 5 | 1 | Ronald Bennett | Honduras | 14.07 | Q |
| 6 | 1 | Luis Fernando Ferreira | Brazil | 14.16 | Q |
| 7 | 1 | Agustín Carrera | Argentina | 14.20 | q |
| 8 | 2 | Fábio dos Santos | Brazil | 14.28 | q |
| 9 | 1 | Genaro Rodríguez | Mexico | 14.30 | PB |
| 10 | 2 | Augusto Alzate | Colombia | 14.36 | |
| 11 | 2 | Mariano Romero | Argentina | 14.38 | |
| 12 | 1 | Ramón Sosa | Dominican Republic | 14.50 | |
| 13 | 2 | José Antonio Flores | Mexico | 14.60 | |
| 14 | 1 | Jhonatan Davis | Venezuela | 14.62 | |
| 15 | 1 | Ernesto Stanley | Paraguay | 14.74 | SB |

Final – June 9
Wind:
+1.0 m/s

| Rank | Name | Nationality | Time | Notes |
|---|---|---|---|---|
| 1st place, gold medalist(s) | Ignacio Morales | Cuba | 13.54 | SB |
| 2nd place, silver medalist(s) | Héctor Cotto | Puerto Rico | 13.69 | SB |
| 3rd place, bronze medalist(s) | Francisco Javier López | Spain | 13.77 | SB |
| 4 | Agustín Carrera | Argentina | 13.92 | NR |
| 5 | Paulo Villar | Colombia | 13.97 | |
| 6 | Ronald Bennett | Honduras | 14.00 | |
| 7 | Luis Fernando Ferreira | Brazil | 14.06 | |
| 8 | Fábio dos Santos | Brazil | 14.62 | |

=== 400 meters hurdles ===
Heats – June 8

| Rank | Heat | Name | Nationality | Time | Notes |
|---|---|---|---|---|---|
| 1 | 1 | Winder Cuevas | Dominican Republic | 50.75 | Q |
| 2 | 1 | Hederson Estefani | Brazil | 50.88 | Q |
| 3 | 2 | Amaurys Valle | Cuba | 51.00 | Q |
| 4 | 1 | Andrés Silva | Uruguay | 51.32 | Q |
| 5 | 2 | Eric Alejandro | Puerto Rico | 51.70 | Q |
| 6 | 2 | Raphael Fernandes | Brazil | 52.00 | Q |
| 7 | 2 | Sergio Rios | Mexico | 52.20 | q |
| 8 | 2 | Emerson Chala | Ecuador | 52.29 | q |
| 9 | 1 | Lucirio Francisco Garrido | Venezuela | 52.33 | |
| 10 | 1 | Pedro Suaxo | Honduras | 52.34 | PB |
| 11 | 2 | Víctor Solarte | Venezuela | 54.37 | |
| 12 | 1 | Jhon Tamayo | Ecuador | 55.24 | |

Final – June 8

| Rank | Name | Nationality | Time | Notes |
|---|---|---|---|---|
| 1st place, gold medalist(s) | Eric Alejandro | Puerto Rico | 49.36 | PB |
| 2nd place, silver medalist(s) | Amaurys Valle | Cuba | 49.69 | |
| 3rd place, bronze medalist(s) | Hederson Estefani | Brazil | 49.70 | PB |
| 4 | Winder Cuevas | Dominican Republic | 50.16 | SB |
| 5 | Sergio Rios | Mexico | 51.33 | |
| 6 | Emerson Chala | Ecuador | 51.43 | |
| 7 | Andrés Silva | Uruguay | 51.68 | |
| | Raphael Fernandes | Brazil | DNF | |

=== 3000 meters steeplechase ===
June 8

| Rank | Name | Nationality | Time | Notes |
|---|---|---|---|---|
| 1st place, gold medalist(s) | José Peña | Venezuela | 8:37.67 | |
| 2nd place, silver medalist(s) | Marvin Blanco | Venezuela | 8:45.35 | |
| 3rd place, bronze medalist(s) | Gladson Barbosa | Brazil | 8:50.83 | |
| 4 | Mariano Mastromarino | Argentina | 8:59.20 | |
| 5 | Derlis Ramón Ayala | Paraguay | 9:15.10 | |
| 6 | Álvaro Vásquez | Nicaragua | 9:15.57 | |
| 7 | Gerardo Villacres | Ecuador | 9:18.98 | |
| 8 | Álvaro Abreu | Dominican Republic | 9:19.19 | |

=== 4 × 100 meters relay ===
June 10

| Rank | Nation | Competitors | Time | Notes |
|---|---|---|---|---|
| 1st place, gold medalist(s) | Brazil | Carlos de Moraes Jr., Sandro Viana, Nilson André, Aldemir da Silva | 38.95 | |
| 2nd place, silver medalist(s) | Venezuela | Jermaine Chirinos, Arturo Ramírez, Diego Rivas, José Acevedo | 39.01 | |
| 3rd place, bronze medalist(s) | Ecuador | Jhon Valencia, Franklin Nazareno, Jhon Tamayo, Álex Quiñónez | 40.83 | |

=== 4 × 400 meters relay ===
June 10

| Rank | Nation | Competitors | Time | Notes |
|---|---|---|---|---|
| 1st place, gold medalist(s) | Cuba | Carlos Véliz, Raidel Acea, Orestes Rodríguez, William Collazo | 3:00.43 | |
| 2nd place, silver medalist(s) | Venezuela | Arturo Ramírez, Albert Bravo, José Meléndez, Omar Longar | 3:01.70 | |
| 3rd place, bronze medalist(s) | Dominican Republic | Gustavo Cuesta, Yon Soriano, Winder Cuevas, Luguelín Santos | 3:03.02 | |
| 4 | Brazil | Pedro de Oliveira, Hederson Estefani, Jhonathan da Silva, Anderson Henriques | 3:03.05 | |
| 5 | Ecuador | Emerson Chala, Lenin Flores, Jhon Tamayo, Álex Quiñónez | 3:09.48 | NR |

=== 20,000 meters walk ===
June 10

| Rank | Name | Nationality | Time | Notes |
|---|---|---|---|---|
| 1st place, gold medalist(s) | James Rendón | Colombia | 1:26:12.03 | CR |
| 2nd place, silver medalist(s) | Moacir Zimmermann | Brazil | 1:29:15.59 | |
| 3rd place, bronze medalist(s) | Rubén Abreu | Cuba | 1:30:09.14 | |
| 4 | Juan Manuel Cano | Argentina | 1:31:41.24 | |
| 5 | Yereman Salazar | Venezuela | 1:35:56.81 | |
| | Wilman Vera | Venezuela | DQ | |
| | Gustavo Restrepo | Colombia | DQ | |
| | Ronal Quispe | Bolivia | DNS | |
| | Jonathan Riekmann | Brazil | DNS | |
| | Bernardo Calvo | Costa Rica | DNS | |

=== High jump ===
June 8

| Rank | Athlete | Nationality | 2.06 | 2.11 | 2.16 | 2.19 | 2.22 | 2.25 | 2.28 | 2.31 | Result | Notes |
|---|---|---|---|---|---|---|---|---|---|---|---|---|
| 1st place, gold medalist(s) | Wanner Miller | Colombia | – | o | o | – | xo | o | o | xxx | 2.28 | |
| 2nd place, silver medalist(s) | Guilherme Cobbo | Brazil | – | – | xo | xo | o | xo | xxx | | 2.25 | |
| 3rd place, bronze medalist(s) | Diego Ferrín | Ecuador | – | – | xo | xo | o | xo | xxx | | 2.25 | |
| 4 | Luis Castro | Puerto Rico | o | o | xo | xo | o | xxx | | | 2.22 | |
| 5 | Javier Bermejo | Spain | – | o | o | xo | xxx | | | | 2.19 | |
| 6 | Carlos Layoy | Argentina | o | xo | o | xo | xxx | | | | 2.19 | |
| 7 | Sérgio Mestre | Cuba | – | – | o | – | xxx | | | | 2.16 | |
| 8 | Talles Silva | Brazil | – | o | xxo | xxx | | | | | 2.16 | |
| 9 | Eure Yáñez | Venezuela | xo | xo | xxx | | | | | | 2.11 | |

=== Pole vault ===
June 9

| Rank | Athlete | Nationality | 4.90 | 5.00 | 5.10 | 5.20 | 5.30 | 5.35 | 5.40 | 5.60 | Result | Notes |
|---|---|---|---|---|---|---|---|---|---|---|---|---|
| 1st place, gold medalist(s) | Germán Chiaraviglio | Argentina | – | – | – | o | – | – | o | xxx | 5.40 | |
| 2nd place, silver medalist(s) | Augusto de Oliveira | Brazil | – | – | xxo | – | o | xx– | x | | 5.30 | |
| 3rd place, bronze medalist(s) | Yankier Lara | Cuba | – | – | xo | o | xxx | | | | 5.20 | |
| 4 | João Gabriel Sousa | Brazil | – | – | o | xxx | | | | | 5.10 | |
| 5 | Rubén Benitez | Argentina | o | – | xo | xxx | | | | | 5.10 | |
| 6 | César González | Venezuela | xo | xxx | | | | | | | 4.90 | SB |
| 7 | Alexander Castillo | Puerto Rico | xxo | xxx | | | | | | | 4.90 | |
| | Igor Morales | Venezuela | – | xxx | | | | | | | NM | |

=== Long jump ===
June 8

| Rank | Athlete | Nationality | #1 | #2 | #3 | #4 | #5 | #6 | Result | Notes |
|---|---|---|---|---|---|---|---|---|---|---|
| 1st place, gold medalist(s) | Georni Jaramillo | Venezuela | 7.28 | 7.68 | 7.34 | – | 7.69 | 8.02w | 8.02w | |
| 2nd place, silver medalist(s) | Jean Marie Okutu | Spain | x | 7.49 | x | 7.56 | 7.87 | x | 7.87 | SB |
| 3rd place, bronze medalist(s) | Rogério Bispo | Brazil | 7.67 | 5.78w | 7.30 | x | 7.62 | 7.63w | 7.67 | |
| 4 | Emiliano Lasa | Uruguay | 7.37 | 7.40 | 7.42w | 7.51 | 7.16 | 7.56 | 7.56 | |
| 5 | Jhamal Bowen | Panama | 7.12 | x | 7.40 | x | – | x | 7.40 | |
| 6 | Jorge McFarlane | Peru | 5.80w | 7.30w | – | – | – | – | 7.30w | |
| 7 | Marcos Amalbert | Puerto Rico | 7.13 | 6.91 | 6.86 | 7.11 | 6.97w | 7.29 | 7.29 | |
| 8 | Lourival Neto | Brazil | x | x | 7.05w | 7.28 | x | x | 7.28 | |
| 9 | Erick Zambrano | Ecuador | 7.04w | x | x | | | | 7.04w | |
| 10 | Jasson Castro | Honduras | 6.53 | x | 6.56w | | | | 6.56 | |

=== Triple jump ===
June 9

| Rank | Athlete | Nationality | #1 | #2 | #3 | #4 | #5 | #6 | Result | Notes |
|---|---|---|---|---|---|---|---|---|---|---|
| 1st place, gold medalist(s) | Yoandri Betanzos | Cuba | 15.70 | x | 16.37w | 16.21w | 16.75w | 16.53 | 16.75w | |
| 2nd place, silver medalist(s) | Jefferson Sabino | Brazil | x | x | 16.44w | 16.66 | 16.70w | 16.49 | 16.70w | |
| 3rd place, bronze medalist(s) | Jonathan Henrique Silva | Brazil | 16.02 | 16.45 | 15.24w | 15.59w | 16.48 | 16.38w | 16.48 | |
| 4 | José Emilio Bellido | Spain | 15.96 | 16.31 | 15.85 | 16.42w | 16.41w | x | 16.42w | |
| 5 | Adrián Sornosa | Ecuador | 15.34 | 15.93w | 15.92 | 16.04w | 15.66w | 16.22w | 16.22w | |
| 6 | Jhon Murillo | Colombia | x | 15.43 | 14.29 | 16.14w | x | 15.99w | 16.14w | |
| 7 | Peter Camacho | Venezuela | x | 15.36 | 15.76 | 14.86w | 14.90 | 15.52w | 15.76 | PB |
| 8 | Alberto Álvarez | Mexico | 15.37w | 15.49 | 15.66w | 15.71w | 15.28 | – | 15.71w | |
| 9 | Ángel Delgado | Venezuela | x | x | 15.11 | | | | 15.11 | SB |
| 10 | Maximiliano Díaz | Argentina | x | x | 14.83 | | | | 14.83 | |

=== Shot put ===
June 9

| Rank | Athlete | Nationality | #1 | #2 | #3 | #4 | #5 | #6 | Result | Notes |
|---|---|---|---|---|---|---|---|---|---|---|
| 1st place, gold medalist(s) | Germán Lauro | Argentina | x | 19.77 | 20.13 | 20.02 | x | 19.80 | 20.13 | |
| 2nd place, silver medalist(s) | Carlos Véliz | Cuba | 19.97 | 19.35 | 19.50 | 19.43 | 19.73 | 19.22 | 19.97 | |
| 3rd place, bronze medalist(s) | Darlan Romani | Brazil | x | 18.93 | x | 18.80 | x | 18.04 | 18.93 | |
| 4 | Willian Braido | Brazil | 18.28 | 17.97 | 18.57 | 18.03 | 18.85 | 18.59 | 18.85 | PB |
| 5 | Eder Moreno | Colombia | 18.21 | 18.63 | x | x | x | x | 18.63 | |
| 6 | Carlos Tobalina | Spain | 17.39 | 17.94 | x | 18.47 | 18.13 | x | 18.47 | |
| 7 | Nicolás Martina | Argentina | 17.84 | 17.45 | 18.22 | x | 17.93 | 18.11 | 18.22 | SB |
| 8 | Aldo González | Bolivia | 16.68 | 16.96 | 16.49 | 16.33 | 16.73 | 16.98 | 16.98 | |
| 9 | Yojer Medina | Venezuela | 16.84 | 16.40 | 16.11 | | | | 16.84 | SB |
| 10 | Juan Álvarez | Honduras | 14.53 | 13.73 | 14.26 | | | | 14.53 | |

=== Discus throw ===
June 8

| Rank | Athlete | Nationality | #1 | #2 | #3 | #4 | #5 | #6 | Result | Notes |
|---|---|---|---|---|---|---|---|---|---|---|
| 1st place, gold medalist(s) | Germán Lauro | Argentina | 60.71 | 63.55 | 59.28 | x | 60.89 | 62.23 | 63.55 | PB |
| 2nd place, silver medalist(s) | Ronald Julião | Brazil | 59.22 | 61.61 | x | 61.51 | 61.67 | x | 61.67 | |
| 3rd place, bronze medalist(s) | Pedro José Cuesta | Spain | 55.47 | 56.23 | 56.62 | 59.77 | 58.10 | 58.09 | 59.77 | |
| 4 | Mario Cota | Mexico | 58.89 | 58.51 | 57.41 | 57.79 | 56.60 | 58.05 | 58.89 | |
| 5 | Jorge Grave | Portugal | 55.97 | 53.66 | x | 57.40 | 58.32 | x | 58.32 | SB |
| 6 | Jorge Balliengo | Argentina | 55.00 | 55.40 | 54.24 | 55.88 | 55.01 | 53.00 | 55.88 | |
| 7 | Max Alonso | Chile | 47.91 | 50.95 | 54.32 | x | 53.25 | 54.72 | 54.72 | |
| 8 | Jesús Parejo | Venezuela | 53.88 | 53.88 | 52.86 | 53.67 | 52.29 | 53.54 | 53.88 | |
| 9 | Carlos Valle | Brazil | 50.61 | 52.87 | 51.33 | | | | 52.87 | |
| 10 | Winston Campbell | Honduras | 47.02 | x | 48.40 | | | | 48.40 | |
| 11 | Héctor Hurtado | Venezuela | 47.16 | x | 46.66 | | | | 47.16 | |
| | Juan Caicedo | Ecuador | | | | | | | DNS | |
| | Carlos Tobalina | Spain | | | | | | | DNS | |

=== Hammer throw ===
June 9

| Rank | Athlete | Nationality | #1 | #2 | #3 | #4 | #5 | #6 | Result | Notes |
|---|---|---|---|---|---|---|---|---|---|---|
| 1st place, gold medalist(s) | Roberto Janet | Cuba | 69.65 | 70.03 | 71.70 | 70.84 | 72.74 | 69.35 | 72.74 | |
| 2nd place, silver medalist(s) | Wagner Domingos | Brazil | 65.41 | 69.43 | 68.00 | 70.67 | 71.91 | 65.80 | 71.91 | |
| 3rd place, bronze medalist(s) | Juan Ignacio Cerra | Argentina | 69.61 | 70.16 | 70.12 | 70.00 | 70.86 | x | 70.86 | |
| 4 | Roberto Sawyers | Costa Rica | 67.74 | 67.54 | 67.06 | 67.99 | x | 67.58 | 67.99 | |
| 5 | Fabián Di Paolo | Argentina | 62.51 | 64.41 | 64.87 | 62.72 | 63.94 | 65.58 | 65.58 | |
| 6 | Aldo Bello | Venezuela | 61.40 | 64.79 | x | 63.56 | 63.42 | 62.48 | 64.79 | |
| 7 | Pedro da Costa | Brazil | 60.58 | 59.90 | 60.09 | 60.18 | x | x | 60.58 | |
| 8 | Prinston Quailey | Venezuela | 56.79 | 57.11 | x | 59.95 | 57.50 | 59.14 | 59.95 | |
| | Diego Berrios | Guatemala | | | | | | | DNS | |

=== Javelin throw ===
June 9

| Rank | Athlete | Nationality | #1 | #2 | #3 | #4 | #5 | #6 | Result | Notes |
|---|---|---|---|---|---|---|---|---|---|---|
| 1st place, gold medalist(s) | Braian Toledo | Argentina | 73.82 | x | 77.33 | x | x | 77.30 | 77.33 | |
| 2nd place, silver medalist(s) | Arley Ibargüen | Colombia | 73.82 | x | 73.54 | x | 71.08 | 76.48 | 76.48 | |
| 3rd place, bronze medalist(s) | Dayron Márquez | Colombia | 75.80 | 74.31 | 76.48 | x | 75.74 | 70.46 | 76.48 | |
| 4 | Víctor Fatecha | Paraguay | 75.15 | x | x | x | x | x | 75.15 | |
| 5 | Juan José Méndez | Mexico | 59.46 | 64.35 | 68.22 | 70.46 | 72.35 | 66.85 | 72.35 | |
| 6 | Júlio César de Oliveira | Brazil | 70.78 | 66.75 | 66.90 | 67.60 | x | x | 70.78 | |
| 7 | José Escobar | Ecuador | 64.65 | 62.46 | x | 68.69 | 69.38 | 63.71 | 69.38 | |
| 8 | Reynan Costa | Brazil | x | 69.06 | x | x | x | x | 69.06 | |
| 9 | Felipe Ortiz | Puerto Rico | x | 56.69 | 62.19 | | | | 62.19 | |

=== Decathlon ===
June 8–9

The highest mark recorded in each event is highlighted in yellow

| Rank | Athlete | Nationality | 100m | LJ | SP | HJ | 400m | 110m H | DT | PV | JT | 1500m | Points | Notes |
|---|---|---|---|---|---|---|---|---|---|---|---|---|---|---|
| 1st place, gold medalist(s) | Luiz Alberto de Araújo | Brazil | 11.09 | 7.28 | 14.17 | 1.95 | 48.49 | 14.28 | 43.56 | 4.60 | 52.98 | 4:58.62 | 7772 | |
| 2nd place, silver medalist(s) | Ânderson Venâncio | Brazil | 11.19 | 6.91w | 13.39 | 1.95 | 49.66 | 15.08 | 39.46 | 4.60 | 60.00 | 4:58.30 | 7482 | |
| 3rd place, bronze medalist(s) | Tiago Marco | Portugal | 11.28 | 7.03 | 13.62 | 1.98 | 51.87 | 14.89 | 40.06 | 4.40 | 55.04 | 4:57.46 | 7338 | SB |
| 4 | Fernando Korniejczuk | Argentina | 11.56 | 6.88w | 12.31 | 1.89 | 52.17 | 15.18 | 38.65 | 4.40 | 54.50 | 4:52.78 | 7025 | PB |
| 5 | Wuilian Valor | Venezuela | 11.43 | 6.87 | 12.17 | 1.83 | 53.64 | 15.64 | 37.49 | 4.40 | 71.48 | 5:16.01 | 6977 | |
| 6 | Ricardo Herrada | Venezuela | 11.66 | 6.80 | 11.93 | 1.86 | 51.78 | 15.27 | 39.52 | 4.30 | 54.87 | 4:48.84 | 6962 | |
| 7 | Guillermo Ruggeri | Argentina | 11.25 | 6.58 | 12.48 | 1.86 | 49.11 | 15.14 | 38.24 | 3.60 | 49.69 | 4:52.29 | 6853 | |

== Women's results ==
=== 100 meters ===
Heats – June 8
Wind:
Heat 1: -4.2 m/s, Heat 2: +2.5 m/s, Heat 3: +0.1 m/s

| Rank | Heat | Name | Nationality | Time | Notes |
|---|---|---|---|---|---|
| 1 | 1 | Rosângela Santos | Brazil | 11.63 | Q |
| 2 | 2 | María Idrobo | Colombia | 11.65 | Q |
| 3 | 2 | Evelyn dos Santos | Brazil | 11.66 | Q |
| 4 | 3 | Yomara Hinestroza | Colombia | 11.70 | Q |
| 5 | 3 | Fany Chalas | Dominican Republic | 11.77 | Q |
| 6 | 1 | Mariely Sánchez | Dominican Republic | 11.83 | Q |
| 7 | 3 | Wilmary Álvarez | Venezuela | 11.90 | q |
| 8 | 3 | Genoiska Cancel | Puerto Rico | 11.90 | q |
| 9 | 1 | Jessica Branker | Mexico | 11.94 | SB |
| 10 | 1 | Beatriz Cruz | Puerto Rico | 11.98 | |
| 11 | 3 | Tracy Joseph | Costa Rica | 12.03 | PB |
| 12 | 2 | Nercelis Soto | Venezuela | 12.07 | |
| 13 | 3 | Sara Santiago | Spain | 12.29 | |
| 14 | 2 | Maitane Iruretagoiena | Spain | 12.42 | |
| 15 | 2 | Cassandra Hunt | Panama | 12.43 | |
| 16 | 2 | Bruna Ortega | Ecuador | 12.45 | |
| 17 | 1 | Leslie Arnez | Bolivia | 12.48 | |

Final – June 8
Wind:
-0.6 m/s

| Rank | Name | Nationality | Time | Notes |
|---|---|---|---|---|
| 1st place, gold medalist(s) | Rosângela Santos | Brazil | 11.41 | |
| 2nd place, silver medalist(s) | Evelyn dos Santos | Brazil | 11.45 | |
| 3rd place, bronze medalist(s) | María Idrobo | Colombia | 11.53 | SB |
| 4 | Mariely Sánchez | Dominican Republic | 11.68 | |
| 5 | Yomara Hinestroza | Colombia | 11.77 | |
| 6 | Wilmary Álvarez | Venezuela | 11.89 | |
| 7 | Genoiska Cancel | Puerto Rico | 11.94 | |
| 8 | Fany Chalas | Dominican Republic | 12.81 | |

=== 200 meters ===
Heats – June 9
Wind:
Heat 1: -4.2 m/s, Heat 2: +2.5 m/s, Heat 3: +0.1 m/s

| Rank | Heat | Name | Nationality | Time | Notes |
|---|---|---|---|---|---|
| 1 | 3 | Evelyn dos Santos | Brazil | 23.11 | Q |
| 2 | 3 | María Idrobo | Colombia | 23.30 | Q |
| 3 | 3 | Mariely Sánchez | Dominican Republic | 23.31 | q |
| 4 | 1 | Geisa Coutinho | Brazil | 23.36 | Q |
| 5 | 3 | Erika Chávez | Ecuador | 23.46 | q |
| 6 | 1 | Nercelis Soto | Venezuela | 23.52 | Q |
| 7 | 2 | Darlenys Obregón | Colombia | 23.72 | Q |
| 8 | 1 | Fany Chalas | Dominican Republic | 23.80 | |
| 9 | 1 | María Mackenna | Chile | 23.91 | |
| 10 | 2 | Nelkis Casabona | Cuba | 23.94 | Q |
| 11 | 2 | Tracy Joseph | Costa Rica | 23.99 | |
| 12 | 2 | Wilmary Álvarez | Venezuela | 24.09 | |
| 12 | 3 | Beatriz Cruz | Puerto Rico | 24.09 | |
| 14 | 3 | Alazne Furundarena | Spain | 24.30 | |
| 15 | 2 | Jessica Branker | Mexico | 24.34 | |
| 16 | 2 | Bruna Ortega | Ecuador | 24.64 | |
| 17 | 2 | Ruth Hunt | Panama | 24.75 | |
| 18 | 1 | Leslie Arnez | Bolivia | 24.81 | |
| 19 | 1 | Genoiska Cancel | Puerto Rico | 24.87 | |
| 20 | 1 | Plácida Martínez | Spain | 25.12 | |
| | 3 | Mariza Karabia | Paraguay | DQ | |

Final – June 9
Wind:
-0.6 m/s

| Rank | Name | Nationality | Time | Notes |
|---|---|---|---|---|
| 1st place, gold medalist(s) | Evelyn dos Santos | Brazil | 22.99 | PB |
| 2nd place, silver medalist(s) | María Idrobo | Colombia | 23.20 | PB |
| 3rd place, bronze medalist(s) | Mariely Sánchez | Dominican Republic | 23.26 | SB |
| 4 | Nercelis Soto | Venezuela | 23.30 | |
| 5 | Erika Chávez | Ecuador | 23.36 | =NR |
| 6 | Darlenys Obregón | Colombia | 23.59 | SB |
| 7 | Nelkis Casabona | Cuba | 23.65 | |
| 8 | Geisa Coutinho | Brazil | 23.66 | |

=== 400 meters ===
Heats – June 8

| Rank | Heat | Name | Nationality | Time | Notes |
|---|---|---|---|---|---|
| 1 | 1 | Joelma Sousa | Brazil | 53.27 | Q |
| 2 | 2 | Daisurami Bonne | Cuba | 53.68 | Q |
| 3 | 2 | Geisa Coutinho | Brazil | 53.74 | Q |
| 4 | 2 | Raysa Sánchez | Dominican Republic | 54.01 | Q |
| 5 | 1 | Aymée Martínez | Cuba | 54.48 | Q |
| 6 | 2 | Natalia Romero | Spain | 54.78 | q, SB |
| 7 | 1 | Begoña Garrido | Spain | 54.98 | Q, SB |
| 8 | 1 | Ángela Alfonso | Venezuela | 56.64 | q |
| 9 | 2 | Brisaida Avila | Venezuela | 58.25 | |
| 10 | 2 | Ángela Tenorio | Ecuador | 59.20 | |
| | 1 | Lucy Jaramillo | Ecuador | DNS | |

Final – June 8

| Rank | Name | Nationality | Time | Notes |
|---|---|---|---|---|
| 1st place, gold medalist(s) | Daisurami Bonne | Cuba | 52.27 | SB |
| 2nd place, silver medalist(s) | Geisa Coutinho | Brazil | 52.66 | |
| 3rd place, bronze medalist(s) | Joelma Sousa | Brazil | 52.72 | |
| 4 | Raysa Sánchez | Dominican Republic | 52.94 | |
| 5 | Aymée Martínez | Cuba | 53.15 | SB |
| 6 | Natalia Romero | Spain | 55.18 | |
| 7 | Begoña Garrido | Spain | 55.44 | |
| 8 | Ángela Alfonso | Venezuela | 56.41 | |

=== 800 meters ===
Heats – June 9

| Rank | Heat | Name | Nationality | Time | Notes |
|---|---|---|---|---|---|
| 1 | 2 | Cristina Guevara | Mexico | 2:05.45 | Q |
| 2 | 2 | Adriana Muñoz | Cuba | 2:06.19 | Q |
| 3 | 2 | Christiane dos Santos | Brazil | 2:06.29 | Q |
| 4 | 2 | Andrea Ferris | Panama | 2:06.60 | q |
| 5 | 2 | María Carmen González | Spain | 2:08.77 | q |
| 6 | 1 | Rosemary Almanza | Cuba | 2:12.36 | Q |
| 7 | 1 | Khadija Rahmouni | Spain | 2:12.38 | Q |
| 8 | 1 | Rosibel García | Colombia | 2:12.39 | Q |
| 9 | 1 | Gabriela Medina | Mexico | 2:13.04 | |
| 10 | 1 | Jéssica dos Santos | Brazil | 2:14.46 | |
| 11 | 1 | Felismina Cavela | Angola | 2:15.13 | |
| 12 | 2 | Evangelina Thomas | Argentina | 2:15.33 | |
| 13 | 1 | Magaly García | Venezuela | 2:19.90 | |

Final – June 9

| Rank | Name | Nationality | Time | Notes |
|---|---|---|---|---|
| 1st place, gold medalist(s) | Rosibel García | Colombia | 2:03.00 | |
| 2nd place, silver medalist(s) | Rosemary Almanza | Cuba | 2:03.29 | |
| 3rd place, bronze medalist(s) | Adriana Muñoz | Cuba | 2:03.72 | |
| 4 | Cristina Guevara | Mexico | 2:04.27 | PB |
| 5 | Christiane dos Santos | Brazil | 2:04.87 | |
| 6 | Andrea Ferris | Panama | 2:06.18 | |
| 7 | Khadija Rahmouni | Spain | 2:06.40 | |
| 8 | María Carmen González | Spain | 2:06.87 | |

=== 1500 meters ===
June 10

| Rank | Name | Nationality | Time | Notes |
|---|---|---|---|---|
| 1st place, gold medalist(s) | Adriana Muñoz | Cuba | 4:20.36 | SB |
| 2nd place, silver medalist(s) | Andrea Ferris | Panama | 4:20.50 | SB |
| 3rd place, bronze medalist(s) | Sandra López | Mexico | 4:21.00 | |
| 4 | Gladys Landaverde | El Salvador | 4:21.04 | NR |
| 5 | Cristina Guevara | Mexico | 4:21.77 | |
| 6 | María Osorio | Venezuela | 4:22.16 | |
| 7 | Christiane dos Santos | Brazil | 4:23.45 | |
| 8 | Diana Suarez | Colombia | 4:26.51 | |
| 9 | Zuna Portillo | El Salvador | 4:27.80 | PB |
| 10 | Evangelina Thomas | Argentina | 4:30.29 | |
| 11 | María Mancebo | Dominican Republic | 4:30.88 | |
| 12 | Yony Ninahuamán | Peru | 4:33.34 | |
| 13 | Érika Lima | Brazil | 4:34.51 | |
| 14 | Felismina Cavela | Angola | 4:39.88 | |

=== 3000 meters ===
June 8

| Rank | Name | Nationality | Time | Notes |
|---|---|---|---|---|
| 1st place, gold medalist(s) | Tatiele de Carvalho | Brazil | 9:20.07 | PB |
| 2nd place, silver medalist(s) | Nadia Rodríguez | Argentina | 9:23.17 | |
| 3rd place, bronze medalist(s) | Catarina Ribeiro | Portugal | 9:26.98 | PB |
| 4 | Érika Lima | Brazil | 9:43.68 | SB |
| 5 | María Osorio | Venezuela | 9:51.99 | PB |
| 6 | Nubia Arteaga | Venezuela | 10:15.22 | |
| | Anayelli Navarro | Mexico | DNS | |

=== 5000 meters ===
June 9

| Rank | Name | Nationality | Time | Notes |
|---|---|---|---|---|
| 1st place, gold medalist(s) | Sandra López | Mexico | 16:10.77 | |
| 2nd place, silver medalist(s) | Fabiana da Silva | Brazil | 16:12.20 | SB |
| 3rd place, bronze medalist(s) | Nadia Rodríguez | Argentina | 16:18.52 | |
| 4 | Catarina Ribeiro | Portugal | 16:25.23 | SB |
| 5 | Anayelli Navarro | Mexico | 16:32.49 | |
| 6 | Ángela Figueroa | Colombia | 16:42.94 | SB |
| 7 | Nubia Arteaga | Venezuela | 18:12.51 | |

=== 100 meters hurdles ===
Heats – June 9
Wind:
Heat 1: -0.3 m/s, Heat 2: -0.4 m/s

| Rank | Heat | Name | Nationality | Time | Notes |
|---|---|---|---|---|---|
| 1 | 1 | Eliecit Palacios | Colombia | 13.32 | Q |
| 2 | 1 | LaVonne Idlette | Dominican Republic | 13.33 | Q |
| 3 | 2 | Belkys Milanea | Cuba | 13.38 | Q |
| 4 | 2 | Giselle de Albuquerque | Brazil | 13.51 | Q |
| 5 | 1 | Maíla Machado | Brazil | 13.76 | Q |
| 6 | 1 | Winnie Castillo | Ecuador | 14.10 | q |
| 7 | 2 | Jeimy Bernárdez | Honduras | 14.11 | Q |
| 8 | 2 | Elizabeth López | Mexico | 14.15 | q |
| 9 | 2 | Génesis Romero | Venezuela | 14.17 | |
| 10 | 1 | Ada Hernández | Venezuela | 14.19 | SB |
| 11 | 1 | Telma Cossa | Mozambique | 14.49 | SB |
| 12 | 2 | Mariza Karabia | Paraguay | 15.10 | |

Final – June 9
Wind:
+0.4 m/s

| Rank | Name | Nationality | Time | Notes |
|---|---|---|---|---|
| 1st place, gold medalist(s) | Eliecit Palacios | Colombia | 13.15 | PB |
| 2nd place, silver medalist(s) | Belkys Milanea | Cuba | 13.21 | SB |
| 3rd place, bronze medalist(s) | LaVonne Idlette | Dominican Republic | 13.24 | |
| 4 | Giselle de Albuquerque | Brazil | 13.42 | |
| 5 | Maíla Machado | Brazil | 13.47 | SB |
| 6 | Jeimy Bernárdez | Honduras | 14.10 | SB |
| 7 | Elizabeth López | Mexico | 14.16 | PB |
| 8 | Winnie Castillo | Ecuador | 14.43 | |

=== 400 meters hurdles ===
June 8

| Rank | Heat | Name | Nationality | Time | Notes |
|---|---|---|---|---|---|
| 1st place, gold medalist(s) | 2 | Lucimar Teodoro | Brazil | 56.99 | SB |
| 2nd place, silver medalist(s) | 2 | Sharolyn Scott | Costa Rica | 57.10 | |
| 3rd place, bronze medalist(s) | 1 | Yolanda Osana | Dominican Republic | 57.14 | SB |
| 4 | 1 | Jailma de Lima | Brazil | 57.65 | SB |
| 5 | 1 | Lucy Jaramillo | Ecuador | 57.81 | SB |
| 6 | 1 | Princesa Oliveros | Colombia | 57.94 | |
| 7 | 2 | Anisia Castro | Mexico | 59.28 | SB |
| 8 | 1 | Déborah Rodríguez | Uruguay | 59.75 | |
| 9 | 2 | Estefanny Balladares | Venezuela | 1:03.66 | |

=== 3000 meters steeplechase ===
June 8

| Rank | Name | Nationality | Time | Notes |
|---|---|---|---|---|
| 1st place, gold medalist(s) | Yony Ninahuamán | Peru | 10:24.93 | SB |
| 2nd place, silver medalist(s) | María Mancebo | Dominican Republic | 10:28.85 | |
| 3rd place, bronze medalist(s) | Eliane Luanda Pereira | Brazil | 10:44.35 | |
| 4 | Dayana Pérez | Venezuela | 11:09.66 | |
| 5 | Yoli Mendoza | Venezuela | 11:38.77 | |

=== 4 × 100 meters relay ===
June 10

| Rank | Nation | Competitors | Time | Notes |
|---|---|---|---|---|
| 1st place, gold medalist(s) | Brazil | Geisa Coutinho, Lucimar de Moura, Evelyn dos Santos, Rosângela Santos | 43.90 | |
| 2nd place, silver medalist(s) | Dominican Republic | Mariely Sánchez, Fany Chalas, Marleny Mejía, Margarita Manzueta | 44.02 | NR |
| 3rd place, bronze medalist(s) | Colombia | Eliecit Palacios, María Idrobo, Nelcy Caicedo, Darlenys Obregón | 44.42 | |
| 4 | Venezuela | Lexabeth Hidalgo, Wilmary Álvarez, Nelsibeth Villalobos, Nercelis Soto | 44.81 | NR |
| 5 | Spain | Maitane Iruretagoiena, Plácida Martínez, Alazne Furundarena, Sara Santiago | 45.11 | |
| 6 | Ecuador | Bruna Ortega, Ángela Tenorio, Winnie Castillo, Erika Chávez | 46.58 | |

=== 4 × 400 meters relay ===
June 10

| Rank | Nation | Competitors | Time | Notes |
|---|---|---|---|---|
| 1st place, gold medalist(s) | Brazil | Joelma Sousa, Jailma de Lima, Geisa Coutinho, Lucimar Teodoro | 3:28.56 | |
| 2nd place, silver medalist(s) | Cuba | Aymée Martínez, Daisurami Bonne, Rosemary Almanza, Adriana Muñoz | 3:29.13 | |
| 3rd place, bronze medalist(s) | Dominican Republic | Santa Félix, Yolanda Osana, Marleny Mejía, Raysa Sánchez | 3:38.48 | |
| 4 | Venezuela | Nercelis Soto, Ángela Alfonso, Emilleth Pirela, Wilmary Álvarez | 3:38.99 | |
| 5 | Spain | Alazne Furundarena, Natalia Romero, Begoña Garrido, Khadija Rahmouni | 3:39.16 | |
| 6 | Ecuador | Bruna Ortega, Erika Chávez, Ángela Tenorio, Lucy Jaramillo | 3:50.37 | |

=== 10,000 meters walk ===
June 10

| Rank | Name | Nationality | Time | Notes |
|---|---|---|---|---|
| 1st place, gold medalist(s) | Arabelly Orjuela | Colombia | 46:21.88 | |
| 2nd place, silver medalist(s) | Ingrid Hernández | Colombia | 46:48.80 | |
| 3rd place, bronze medalist(s) | Milángela Rosales | Venezuela | 48:10.85 | |
| 4 | Nayibeth Rosales | Venezuela | 49:44.86 | |
| 5 | Lizbeth Silva | Mexico | 50:03.30 | |
| | Gabriela García | Peru | DQ | |
| | Tania Splinder | Brazil | DNF | |
| | Yadira Guamán | Ecuador | DNS | |

=== High jump ===
June 8

| Rank | Athlete | Nationality | 1.60 | 1.65 | 1.70 | 1.75 | 1.78 | 1.81 | 1.84 | 1.86 | 1.89 | 1.92 | Result | Notes |
|---|---|---|---|---|---|---|---|---|---|---|---|---|---|---|
| 1st place, gold medalist(s) | Romary Rifka | Mexico | – | – | o | o | o | o | x | xxo | xo | xxx | 1.89 | SB |
| 2nd place, silver medalist(s) | Aline dos Santos | Brazil | – | – | o | o | o | o | o | xxx | | | 1.84 | |
| 3rd place, bronze medalist(s) | Mônica de Freitas | Brazil | – | – | o | o | xo | o | xxx | | | | 1.81 | |
| 4 | Katerine Nina | Dominican Republic | – | o | o | xxo | o | xo | xxx | | | | 1.81 | |
| 5 | Kashani Ríos | Panama | o | o | o | o | o | xxx | | | | | 1.78 | |
| 6 | Yulimar Rojas | Venezuela | – | o | xo | o | xxx | | | | | | 1.75 | SB |
| 7 | Gillercy González | Venezuela | xo | o | xxo | xxx | | | | | | | 1.70 | |

=== Pole vault ===
June 10

| Rank | Athlete | Nationality | 3.40 | 3.60 | 3.80 | 3.90 | 4.00 | 4.10 | 4.20 | 4.40 | 4.50 | 4.60 | Result | Notes |
|---|---|---|---|---|---|---|---|---|---|---|---|---|---|---|
| 1st place, gold medalist(s) | Dailis Caballero | Cuba | – | – | – | – | – | – | o | xo | xxo | xxx | 4.50 | |
| 2nd place, silver medalist(s) | Karla da Silva | Brazil | – | – | – | – | – | o | xxx | | | | 4.10 | |
| 3rd place, bronze medalist(s) | Sara Pereira | Brazil | – | – | – | o | xo | o | xxx | | | | 4.10 | |
| 4 | Daniela Inchausti | Argentina | – | – | xo | o | o | xxx | | | | | 4.00 | |
| 5 | Valeria Chiaraviglio | Argentina | – | – | o | xxo | o | xxx | | | | | 4.00 | |
| 6 | Alexandra González | Puerto Rico | – | – | xo | – | xo | xxx | | | | | 4.00 | |
| 7 | Carmelita Correa | Mexico | xo | o | xo | xxx | | | | | | | 3.80 | |
| 8 | Catalina Amarilla | Paraguay | o | xxx | | | | | | | | | 3.40 | |
| | Keisa Monterola | Venezuela | – | – | – | – | xxx | | | | | | NM | |
| | Angie Hernández | Colombia | – | xxx | | | | | | | | | NM | |

=== Long jump ===
June 10

| Rank | Athlete | Nationality | #1 | #2 | #3 | #4 | #5 | #6 | Result | Notes |
|---|---|---|---|---|---|---|---|---|---|---|
| 1st place, gold medalist(s) | Eliane Martins | Brazil | 6.50 | 6.48 | 6.51 | x | x | 6.55 | 6.55 | |
| 2nd place, silver medalist(s) | Macarena Reyes | Chile | 6.14 | x | 6.14 | 6.12 | x | x | 6.14 | |
| 3rd place, bronze medalist(s) | Giselle Marculino | Brazil | 6.03 | 6.10 | x | 6.00 | 6.03 | 6.14 | 6.14 | |
| 4 | Munich Tovar | Venezuela | x | x | x | 5.96 | 5.91 | 5.45 | 5.96 | |
| 5 | Génesis Romero | Venezuela | 3.56 | 5.82 | x | 5.81 | x | x | 5.82 | |
| 6 | Elizabeth López | Mexico | x | 5.72 | x | 5.71 | 5.60 | 5.73 | 5.73 | |

=== Triple jump ===
June 9

| Rank | Athlete | Nationality | #1 | #2 | #3 | #4 | #5 | #6 | Result | Notes |
|---|---|---|---|---|---|---|---|---|---|---|
| 1st place, gold medalist(s) | Susana Costa | Portugal | 13.62 | x | x | 13.42 | 13.78 | 13.64 | 13.78 | |
| 2nd place, silver medalist(s) | Gisele de Oliveira | Brazil | x | 13.43 | 13.40 | 13.46 | 13.46 | 13.43 | 13.46 | |
| 3rd place, bronze medalist(s) | Giselly Andrea Landazuri | Colombia | 12.93 | x | 12.91 | x | 13.00 | 13.28 | 13.28 | SB |
| 4 | Tânia da Silva | Brazil | 12.75 | x | 12.82 | 12.58 | 13.03 | 13.08 | 13.08 | |
| 5 | Yudelsy González | Venezuela | x | 12.48 | 12.46 | 12.28 | x | 12.46 | 12.48 | SB |
| 6 | Mayra Pachito | Ecuador | x | 12.01 | 12.25 | 11.86 | – | x | 12.25 | |

=== Shot put ===
June 9

| Rank | Athlete | Nationality | #1 | #2 | #3 | #4 | #5 | #6 | Result | Notes |
|---|---|---|---|---|---|---|---|---|---|---|
| 1st place, gold medalist(s) | Geisa Arcanjo | Brazil | x | 18.84 | 17.95 | 18.31 | x | 18.64 | 18.84 | PB |
| 2nd place, silver medalist(s) | Natalia Ducó | Chile | 17.82 | 18.46 | 18.17 | 18.38 | 18.44 | 18.26 | 18.46 | SB |
| 3rd place, bronze medalist(s) | Misleydis González | Cuba | x | 17.04 | 17.70 | 18.03 | 17.76 | x | 18.03 | |
| 4 | Sandra Lemus | Colombia | 16.65 | 17.47 | 17.29 | x | x | x | 17.47 | |
| 5 | Ángela Rivas | Colombia | 16.28 | 16.53 | 16.13 | 16.33 | 16.90 | x | 16.90 | |
| 6 | Andréa Maria Britto | Brazil | 15.05 | 15.41 | 15.92 | x | 15.66 | 15.08 | 15.92 | SB |
| 7 | Ahymará Espinoza | Venezuela | 15.05 | 15.75 | 15.78 | 15.79 | x | 15.91 | 15.91 | |
| 8 | Alessandra Gamboa | Peru | 14.22 | 15.06 | 14.78 | 14.77 | x | 15.02 | 15.06 | |
| 9 | Giohanny Rojas | Venezuela | 13.46 | 13.49 | 13.38 | | | | 13.49 | |

=== Discus throw ===
June 10

| Rank | Athlete | Nationality | #1 | #2 | #3 | #4 | #5 | #6 | Result | Notes |
|---|---|---|---|---|---|---|---|---|---|---|
| 1st place, gold medalist(s) | Andressa de Morais | Brazil | 64.21 | 62.76 | 60.51 | x | 58.15 | ? | 64.21 | AR |
| 2nd place, silver medalist(s) | Fernanda Martins | Brazil | 56.21 | 56.14 | x | 56.71 | x | 57.87 | 57.87 | |
| 3rd place, bronze medalist(s) | Karen Gallardo | Chile | 56.19 | 57.40 | x | x | 56.30 | 56.76 | 57.40 | |
| 4 | Yaime Pérez | Cuba | x | x | 56.93 | x | x | x | 56.93 | |
| 5 | Rocío Comba | Argentina | 54.87 | 55.47 | x | 55.62 | 54.88 | x | 55.62 | |
| 6 | Sabina Asenjo | Spain | 53.47 | 50.92 | 54.06 | x | 49.97 | ? | 54.06 | |
| 7 | María Cubillán | Venezuela | 51.24 | 48.56 | 48.97 | 48.38 | 49.95 | 48.11 | 51.24 | |
| 8 | Johana Martínez | Colombia | 50.17 | 51.00 | 48.89 | x | 48.76 | 49.16 | 51.00 | SB |
| 9 | Elizabeth Álvarez | Venezuela | 44.89 | 47.44 | 45.94 | | | | 47.44 | |
| | Luz Montaño | Colombia | | | | | | | DNS | |

=== Hammer throw ===
June 8

| Rank | Athlete | Nationality | #1 | #2 | #3 | #4 | #5 | #6 | Result | Notes |
|---|---|---|---|---|---|---|---|---|---|---|
| 1st place, gold medalist(s) | Rosa Rodríguez | Venezuela | 69.71 | 71.48 | 70.86 | x | 71.76 | x | 71.76 | |
| 2nd place, silver medalist(s) | Jennifer Dahlgren | Argentina | 65.17 | 71.23 | 70.02 | x | 70.99 | 68.90 | 71.23 | |
| 3rd place, bronze medalist(s) | Johana Moreno | Colombia | 65.36 | 66.02 | x | 68.58 | 67.19 | x | 68.58 | |
| 4 | Yunaika Crawford | Cuba | x | 66.25 | 64.26 | x | 64.14 | 65.36 | 66.25 | |
| 5 | Josiane Soares | Brazil | x | 59.99 | x | 58.10 | 60.24 | 57.83 | 60.24 | |
| 6 | Zuleima Mina | Ecuador | 55.78 | 59.68 | 60.11 | 58.59 | x | 59.92 | 60.11 | NR |
| 7 | Carla Michel | Brazil | 54.23 | 55.86 | 54.20 | 55.85 | x | x | 55.86 | |
| 8 | Diurkina Freites | Venezuela | 55.53 | x | 55.58 | 53.95 | x | 53.96 | 55.58 | |

=== Javelin throw ===
June 8

| Rank | Athlete | Nationality | #1 | #2 | #3 | #4 | #5 | #6 | Result | Notes |
|---|---|---|---|---|---|---|---|---|---|---|
| 1st place, gold medalist(s) | Flor Ruiz | Colombia | 53.50 | 58.21 | 55.94 | x | 51.06 | 54.90 | 58.21 | |
| 2nd place, silver medalist(s) | Leryn Franco | Paraguay | 52.90 | x | 49.59 | 50.85 | 54.58 | 57.77 | 57.77 | NR |
| 3rd place, bronze medalist(s) | Laila Ferrer e Silva | Brazil | 51.75 | 55.90 | x | 49.89 | 50.09 | 57.14 | 57.14 | |
| 4 | Jucilene de Lima | Brazil | x | 53.79 | 55.98 | 51.63 | 55.49 | 51.90 | 55.98 | |
| 5 | Abigail Gómez | Mexico | 52.56 | x | 51.33 | 51.03 | 50.73 | 51.45 | 52.56 | |
| 6 | Coralys Ortiz | Puerto Rico | x | 50.59 | x | x | x | x | 50.59 | |
| 7 | Bárbara López | Argentina | 48.21 | x | 46.36 | x | 46.61 | 48.72 | 48.72 | |
| 8 | Fresa Núñez | Dominican Republic | x | x | x | x | 47.10 | x | 47.10 | |
| | Yusbely Parra | Venezuela | | | | | | | DNS | |

=== Heptathlon ===
June 9–10

The highest mark recorded in each event is highlighted in yellow

| Rank | Athlete | Nationality | 100m H | HJ | SP | 200m | LJ | JT | 800m | Points | Notes |
|---|---|---|---|---|---|---|---|---|---|---|---|
| 1st place, gold medalist(s) | Lucimara da Silva | Brazil | 13.78 | 1.83 | 12.63 | 24.98 | 6.44 | 42.22 | 2:18.52 | 6160 | AR, CR |
| 2nd place, silver medalist(s) | Thaimara Rivas | Venezuela | 14.21 | 1.68 | 13.51 | 25.72 | 5.63 | 40.87 | 2:18.95 | 5622 | =NR |
| 3rd place, bronze medalist(s) | Tamara de Sousa | Brazil | 14.25 | 1.71 | 14.11 | 24.70 | 5.69 | 44.34 | 2:45.18 | 5548 | PB |
| 4 | Chrystal Ruiz | Mexico | 14.34 | 1.71 | 10.45 | 25.17 | 5.85 | 33.26 | 2:13.48 | 5484 | |
| 5 | Ana Camila Pirelli | Paraguay | 14.77 | 1.62 | 13.91 | 26.02 | 5.52 | 42.87 | 2:18.99 | 5479 | NR |
| 6 | Guillercy González | Venezuela | DNF | DNS | – | – | – | – | – | DNF | |
