= 2021 World Athletics Relays – Women's 4 × 400 metres relay =

Women's 4 × 400 metres relay at the 2021 World Athletics Relays
- Venue: Silesian Stadium
- Location: Chorzów, Poland
- Dates: 1 May 2021 (round 1); 2 May 2021 (final)
- Teams: 14 nations
- Winning time: 3:28.41 min

Medalists
gold medal	Zurian Hechavarría; Rose Mary Almanza; Lisneidy Veitía; Roxana Gómez	Cuba
silver medal	Kornelia Lesiewicz; Małgorzata Hołub-Kowalik; Karolina Łozowska (Note: This athlete did not compete in round 1, but only in the final.); Natalia Kaczmarek; Kinga Gacka (Note: This athlete competed in round 1, but was replaced in the final.)	Poland
bronze medal	Laviai Nielsen; Ama Pipi; Emily Diamond; Jessie Knight; Zoey Clark; Jessica Turner	Great Britain

The women's 4 × 400 metres relay at the 2021 World Athletics Relays was held over two rounds at Silesian Stadium in Chorzów, Poland, on 1 and 2 May 2021. It was the fifth time this event was contested at the World Athletics Relays. Teams could qualify by achieving the entry standard of 3:31.50 minutes or by their position on the World Athletics top list.

Fourteen national teams competed in round 1, where eight teams advanced to the final. In addition, four teams qualified for the 2020 Summer Olympics and ten teams qualified for the 2022 World Athletics Championships. The final was won by the team of Cuba in 3:28.41 min, the nation's first-ever medal at the World Athletics Relays, followed by the team of Poland in second place in 3:28.81 min and the team of Great Britain and Northern Ireland in third place in 3:29.27 min.

== Background ==
In a women's 4 × 400 metres relay race, each team consists of four female athletes, who consecutively run a lap on a 400-metre track and pass on a baton between them. This event had been contested four times at the World Relays before 2021, at every edition since the start in 2014. In 2021, the World Relays were held at the Silesian Stadium in Chorzów, Poland, for the first time.

At the start of the 2021 World Relays, the world record of 3:15.17 min was held by the team of the Soviet Union set at the 1988 Summer Olympics, the championship record of 3:19.39 min was held by the team of the United States set at the 2015 IAAF World Relays, and the world leading performance of 3:26.27 min was run by an international team of Texas A&M Aggies on 14 February 2021. The team of Poland, with their victory in the event at the 2019 IAAF World Relays, were the previous winners.

Records before the 2021 World Athletics Relays
Record	Nation (athletes)	Time	Location	Date
World record	Soviet Union (Tatyana Ledovskaya, Olga Nazarova, Mariya Pinigina, Olga Bryzgina)	3:15.17	Seoul, South Korea	1 October 1988
Championship record	United States (Phyllis Francis, Natasha Hastings, Sanya Richards-Ross, Francena McCorory)	3:19.39	Nassau, The Bahamas	3 May 2015
World leading	Texas A&M Aggies (Jania Martin, Syaira Richardson, Charokee Young, Athing Mu)	3:26.27	Fayetteville, Arkansas, United States	14 February 2021

== Qualification ==
National teams could qualify by running the entry standard of 3:31.50 min in the periods from 1 January 2019 to 6 April 2020 and from 30 November 2020 to 11 April 2021 or by their position on the World Athletics top list on 11 April 2021. There was a target number of 20 teams. Nations could enter a selection of four to eight athletes. A final entry list with nineteen teams was published on 20 April 2021.

== Results ==
=== Round 1 ===
Fourteen national teams competed in the three heats of the first round on 1 May, starting at 18:59 (UTC+2) in the evening. Eight teams, the first two teams of each heat (Q) and the next two fastest teams overall (q), qualified for the final. Twelve teams had a season's best performance (SB). The fastest split time was 49.81 s by Femke Bol of the Netherlands, more than a second faster than the next-fastest runner.

In round 1, teams could also qualify for the postponed 2020 Summer Olympics later that year by qualifying for the final and for the 2022 World Athletics Championships by finishing in the top ten. Four teams newly qualified for the women's 4 × 400 metres relay at the Olympics, joining the eight teams that had already qualified, and ten teams qualified for the women's 4 × 400 metres relay at the World Championships.

Results of round 1
Rank	Heat	Nation	Athletes	Time	Notes
1	2	Cuba	Zurian Hechavarría, Rose Mary Almanza, Lisneidy Veitía, Roxana Gómez	3:27.90	Q, SB, *OG, *WC
2	1	Poland	Kornelia Lesiewicz, Małgorzata Hołub-Kowalik, Kinga Gacka, Natalia Kaczmarek	3:28.11	Q, SB, *WC
3	1	Belgium	Cynthia Bolingo, Imke Vervaet, Paulien Couckuyt, Camille Laus	3:28.27	Q, SB, *WC
4	2	Netherlands	Eva Hovenkamp, Eveline Saalberg, Lisanne de Witte, Femke Bol	3:28.40	Q, *WC
5	3	(United Kingdom) Great Britain & N.I.	Ama Pipi, Zoey Clark, Jessie Knight, Jessica Turner	3:28.83	Q, *WC
6	3	Germany	Nadine Gonska, Corinna Schwab, Karolina Pahlitzsch, Ruth Sophia Spelmeyer-Preuß	3:29.73	Q, SB, *OG, *WC
7	1	Italy	Raphaela Lukudo, Eleonora Marchiando, Petra Nardelli, Ayomide Folorunso	3:30.04	q, SB, *OG, *WC
8	2	France	Amandine Brossier, Sokhna Lacoste, Shana Grebo, Floria Gueï	3:30.46	q, SB, *OG, *WC
9	1	Switzerland	Silke Lemmens, Rachel Pellaud, Veronica Vancardo, Annina Fahr	3:34.85	SB, *WC
10	1	Spain	Sara Gallego, Laura Bueno, Bárbara Camblor, Carmen Sánchez	3:34.92	SB, *WC
11	3	Botswana	Thomphang Basele, Loungo Matlhaku, Galefele Moroko, Amantle Montsho	3:34.99	SB
12	3	Japan	Mayu Kobayashi, Nanako Matsumoto, Ayaka Kawata, Asami Shintaku	3:35.26	SB
13	2	Kenya	Gladys Musyoki, Veronica Kamumbe Mutua, Sylivia Chematui Chesebe, Mary Moraa	3:39.34	SB
14	3	Chile	Stephanie Saavedra, María José Echeverría, Poulette Cardoch, María Fernanda Mackenna	3:41.28	SB

=== Final ===
Eight national teams competed in the final on 2 May at 20:25 (UTC+2) in the evening. At the end of the first leg, Laviai Nielsen of Great Britain and Northern Ireland was the first to hand over the baton, followed by Kornelia Lesiewicz of Poland and Zurian Hechavarría of Cuba; Eva Hovenkamp of the Netherlands handed over in seventh position. After the second leg, Ama Pipi of Great Britain and Northern Ireland had maintained the lead position, followed by Małgorzata Hołub-Kowalik of Poland and Rose Mary Almanza of Cuba; Lisanne de Witte of the Netherlands handed over in sixth position. At the end of the third leg, Femke Bol of the Netherlands had moved into first position, followed by Lisneidy Veitía of Cuba, Emily Diamond of Great Britain and Northern Ireland, and Karolina Łozowska of Poland. In the anchor leg, Roxana Gómez of Cuba moved from second to first position, Natalia Kaczmarek of Poland moved from fourth to second position, Jessie Knight of Great Britain and Northern Ireland stayed in third position, and Lieke Klaver of the Netherlands went from first to fourth position.

The final was won by the team of Cuba in 3:28.41 min, followed by the team of Poland in second place in 3:28.81 min and the team of Great Britain and Northern Ireland in third place in 3:29.27 min. The fastest split time was 50.58 s of Bol, 0.01 s faster than the next-fastest runner Kaczmarek. Teams from Poland and from Great Britain and Northern Ireland had won medals before, but it was the first-ever medal for a Cuban team at the World Athletics Relays. The Cuban president Miguel Díaz-Canel called the victory "unprecedented" on social media.

In an interview, Hechavarria said: "It was extremely tough, but I did my best to hand over the baton as smoothly as possible. This is the biggest achievement in my career." Kaczmarek said: "I'm in good shape, and I'm glad I managed to prove it. Especially because I want to run on this team, celebrate their successes with them, and give them everything I can." Knight said about the race: "There were about four of us who got the baton at the same time and I think I got overly excited. I just went for it, which to be honest in relay running, you've got to do. I got to about 250m winning and I felt really good, but I could just feel the pressure coming. It's the best I could do and I'm really glad I gave it a good go."

Results of the final
Rank	Nation	Athletes	Time
1st place, gold medalist(s)	Cuba	Zurian Hechavarría, Rose Mary Almanza, Lisneidy Veitía, Roxana Gómez	3:28.41
2nd place, silver medalist(s)	Poland	Kornelia Lesiewicz, Małgorzata Hołub-Kowalik, Karolina Łozowska, Natalia Kaczmarek	3:28.81
3rd place, bronze medalist(s)	(United Kingdom) Great Britain & N.I.	Laviai Nielsen, Ama Pipi, Emily Diamond, Jessie Knight	3:29.27
4	Netherlands	Eva Hovenkamp, Lisanne de Witte, Femke Bol, Lieke Klaver	3:30.12
5	Italy	Raphaela Lukudo, Eleonora Marchiando, Petra Nardelli, Ayomide Folorunso	3:32.69
6	Germany	Nadine Gonska, Corinna Schwab, Karolina Pahlitzsch, Ruth Sophia Spelmeyer-Preuß	3:33.00
7	Belgium	Paulien Couckuyt, Hanne Maudens, Margo Van Puyvelde, Camille Laus	3:37.66
8	France	Sounkamba Sylla, Brigitte Ntiamoah, Kellya Pauline, Kalyl Amaro	3:40.58
