= 2014 World Junior Championships in Athletics – Women's 800 metres =

The women's 800 metres event at the 2014 World Junior Championships in Athletics was held in Eugene, Oregon, United States, at Hayward Field on 22, 23 and 24 July.

== Medalists ==
Gold	Margaret Nyairera Wambui; Kenya
Silver	Sahily Diago; Cuba
Bronze	Georgia Wassall; Australia

== Records ==
Standing records prior to the 2014 World Junior Championships in Athletics
World Junior Record	Pamela Jelimo (KEN)	1:54.01	Zürich, Switzerland	29 August 2008
Championship Record	Elena Mirela Lavric (ROU)	2:00.06	Bydgoszcz, Poland	11 July 2008
World Junior Leading	Sahily Diago (CUB)	1:57.74	Havana, Cuba	25 May 2014
Broken records during the 2014 World Junior Championships in Athletics

== Results ==
=== Final ===
24 July
Start time: 20:01 Temperature: 22 °C Humidity: 46 %

Rank	Name	Nationality	Lane	Time	Notes
1st place, gold medalist(s)	Margaret Nyairera Wambui	Kenya	8	2:00.49	PB
2nd place, silver medalist(s)	Sahily Diago	Cuba	3	2:02.11	
3rd place, bronze medalist(s)	Georgia Wassall	Australia	6	2:02.71	
4	Georgia Griffith	Australia	7	2:04.12	
5	Sara Souhi	Morocco	1	2:06.16	
6	Zeyituna Mohammed	Ethiopia	5	2:09.38	
	Aníta Hinriksdóttir	Iceland	4	DNF	
	Maximila Imali	Kenya	2	DNF	

Intermediate times:
400m: 56.33 Aníta Hinriksdóttir

=== Semifinals ===
23 July
First 3 in each heat (Q) and the next 2 fastest (q) advance to the Final

==== Summary ====
Rank	Name	Nationality	Time	Notes
1	Sahily Diago	Cuba	2:03.60	Q
2	Margaret Nyairera Wambui	Kenya	2:03.72	Q PB
3	Georgia Griffith	Australia	2:04.00	Q PB
4	Zeyituna Mohammed	Ethiopia	2:04.62	Q
5	Georgia Wassall	Australia	2:04.84	Q
6	Aníta Hinriksdóttir	Iceland	2:04.99	q
7	Sara Souhi	Morocco	2:05.37	Q PB
7	Maximila Imali	Kenya	2:05.37	q
9	Dureti Edao	Ethiopia	2:07.28	
9	Katelyn Ayers	Canada	2:07.28	
11	Arantza Hernández	Mexico	2:08.46	
12	Sarah Schmidt	Germany	2:08.60	
13	Sabrina Southerland	United States	2:08.76	
14	Alina Ammann	Germany	2:10.03	
15	Gena Löfstrand	South Africa	2:10.40	
16	Erinn Stenman-Fahey	Canada	2:15.35	

==== Details ====
First 3 in each heat (Q) and the next 2 fastest (q) advance to the Final

===== Semifinal 1 =====
24 July
Start time: 12:58 Temperature: 16 °C Humidity: 88%

Rank	Name	Nationality	Lane	Time	Notes
1	Sahily Diago	Cuba	4	2:03.60	Q
2	Margaret Nyairera Wambui	Kenya	8	2:03.72	Q PB
3	Georgia Griffith	Australia	6	2:04.00	Q PB
4	Aníta Hinriksdóttir	Iceland	3	2:04.99	q
5	Dureti Edao	Ethiopia	5	2:07.28	
6	Alina Ammann	Germany	7	2:10.03	
7	Gena Löfstrand	South Africa	1	2:10.40	
8	Erinn Stenman-Fahey	Canada	2	2:15.35	

Intermediate times:
400m: 1:00.76 Aníta Hinriksdóttir

===== Semifinal 2 =====
24 July
Start time: 13:05 Temperature: 16 °C Humidity: 88%

Rank	Name	Nationality	Lane	Time	Notes
1	Zeyituna Mohammed	Ethiopia	5	2:04.62	Q
2	Georgia Wassall	Australia	3	2:04.84	Q
3	Sara Souhi	Morocco	1	2:05.37	Q PB
4	Maximila Imali	Kenya	6	2:05.37	q
5	Katelyn Ayers	Canada	8	2:07.28	
6	Arantza Hernández	Mexico	2	2:08.46	
7	Sarah Schmidt	Germany	7	2:08.60	
8	Sabrina Southerland	United States	4	2:08.76	

Intermediate times:
400m: 1:01.10 Zeyituna Mohammed

=== Heats ===
22 July
First 3 in each heat (Q) and the next 4 fastest (q) advance to the Semi-Finals

==== Summary ====
Rank	Name	Nationality	Time	Notes
1	Aníta Hinriksdóttir	Iceland	2:03.41	Q
2	Margaret Nyairera Wambui	Kenya	2:04.24	Q PB
3	Zeyituna Mohammed	Ethiopia	2:04.47	Q
4	Georgia Griffith	Australia	2:04.53	Q
5	Sahily Diago	Cuba	2:04.60	Q
6	Katelyn Ayers	Canada	2:04.89	Q PB
7	Sarah Schmidt	Germany	2:05.56	q
8	Georgia Wassall	Australia	2:05.69	Q
9	Sabrina Southerland	United States	2:05.84	Q
10	Dureti Edao	Ethiopia	2:06.15	Q
11	Sara Souhi	Morocco	2:06.38	Q
12	Arantza Hernández	Mexico	2:06.49	q PB
13	Alina Ammann	Germany	2:06.91	Q
13	Maximila Imali	Kenya	2:06.91	Q
15	Erinn Stenman-Fahey	Canada	2:06.97	q PB
16	Gena Löfstrand	South Africa	2:07.04	q
17	Asli Arik	Turkey	2:07.26	SB
18	Mathilde Myhrvold	Norway	2:07.30	PB
19	Charlotte Mouchet	France	2:07.38	
20	Livia Müller	Switzerland	2:07.50	PB
21	Jessy Joseph	India	2:07.57	
22	Raevyn Rogers	United States	2:08.01	
23	Aislinn Crossey	Ireland	2:08.06	
24	Síofra Cléirigh Büttner	Ireland	2:08.50	
25	Jennifer Adaeze Edobi	Nigeria	2:09.65	
26	María Pía Fernández	Uruguay	2:10.97	
27	Ryoko Hirano	Japan	2:11.99	
28	Hannia Michelle Palafox	Mexico	2:20.90	
	Arachana Ramdas Adhav	India	DNF	

==== Details ====
First 3 in each heat (Q) and the next 4 fastest (q) advance to the Semi-Finals

===== Heat 1 =====
24 July
Start time: 12:13 Temperature: 22 °C Humidity: 53%

Rank	Name	Nationality	Lane	Time	Notes
1	Aníta Hinriksdóttir	Iceland	3	2:03.41	Q
2	Georgia Griffith	Australia	1	2:04.53	Q
3	Katelyn Ayers	Canada	2	2:04.89	Q PB
4	Sarah Schmidt	Germany	8	2:05.56	q
5	Arantza Hernández	Mexico	4	2:06.49	q PB
6	Gena Löfstrand	South Africa	5	2:07.04	q
7	Mathilde Myhrvold	Norway	6	2:07.30	PB
	Arachana Ramdas Adhav	India	7	DNF	

Intermediate times:
400m: 59.65 Sarah Schmidt

===== Heat 2 =====
24 July
Start time: 12:21 Temperature: 22 °C Humidity: 53%

Rank	Name	Nationality	Lane	Time	Notes
1	Georgia Wassall	Australia	4	2:05.69	Q
2	Dureti Edao	Ethiopia	2	2:06.15	Q
3	Alina Ammann	Germany	8	2:06.91	Q
4	Asli Arik	Turkey	6	2:07.26	SB
5	Charlotte Mouchet	France	3	2:07.38	
6	María Pía Fernández	Uruguay	7	2:10.97	
7	Ryoko Hirano	Japan	5	2:11.99	

Intermediate times:
400m: 1:00.25 Alina Ammann

===== Heat 3 =====
24 July
Start time: 12:28 Temperature: 22 °C Humidity: 53%

Rank	Name	Nationality	Lane	Time	Notes
1	Zeyituna Mohammed	Ethiopia	5	2:04.47	Q
2	Sara Souhi	Morocco	4	2:06.38	Q
3	Maximila Imali	Kenya	3	2:06.91	Q
4	Erinn Stenman-Fahey	Canada	7	2:06.97	q PB
5	Livia Müller	Switzerland	8	2:07.50	PB
6	Raevyn Rogers	United States	6	2:08.01	
7	Aislinn Crossey	Ireland	2	2:08.06	

Intermediate times:
400m: 1:00.20 Raevyn Rogers

===== Heat 4 =====
24 July
Start time: 12:34 Temperature: 22 °C Humidity: 53%

Rank	Name	Nationality	Lane	Time	Notes
1	Margaret Nyairera Wambui	Kenya	4	2:04.24	Q PB
2	Sahily Diago	Cuba	3	2:04.60	Q
3	Sabrina Southerland	United States	2	2:05.84	Q
4	Jessy Joseph	India	5	2:07.57	
5	Síofra Cléirigh Büttner	Ireland	7	2:08.50	
6	Jennifer Adaeze Edobi	Nigeria	6	2:09.65	
7	Hannia Michelle Palafox	Mexico	8	2:20.90	

Intermediate times:
400m: 1:01.74 Margaret Nyairera Wambui

== Participation ==
According to an unofficial count, 29 athletes from 20 countries participated in the event.

- Australia (2)
- Canada (2)
- Cuba (1)
- Ethiopia (2)
- France (1)
- Germany (2)
- Iceland (1)
- India (2)
- Ireland (2)
- Japan (1)
- Kenya (2)
- Mexico (2)
- Morocco (1)
- Nigeria (1)
- Norway (1)
- South Africa (1)
- Switzerland (1)
- Turkey (1)
- United States (2)
- Uruguay (1)
