= Athletics at the 2023 Pan American Games – Women's 4 × 400 metres relay =

Women's 4 × 400 metres relay at the 2023 Pan American Games
- Venue: Julio Martínez National Stadium
- Dates: November 4
- Competitors: 24 from 6 nations
- Winning time: 3:33.15

Medalists
Gold medal	Zurian Hechavarría; Rose Mary Almanza; Sahily Diago; Lisneidy Veitía	Cuba
Silver medal	Mariana Pérez; Anabel Medina; Franshina Martínez; Marileidy Paulino	Dominican Republic
Bronze medal	Anny de Bassi; Letícia Nonato; Jainy dos Santos; Tiffani Marinho	Brazil

The women's 4 × 400 metres relay competition of the athletics events at the 2023 Pan American Games took place on November 4 at the Julio Martínez National Stadium of Santiago, Chile.

== Records ==
Prior to this competition, the existing world and Pan American Games records were as follows:

World record	Soviet Union	3:15.17	Seoul, South Korea	October 1, 1988
Pan American Games record	United States	3:23.35	Indianapolis, United States	August 16, 1987

== Schedule ==
Date	Time	Round
November 4, 2023	20:38	Final

== Results ==
All times shown are in seconds.

KEY:	q	Fastest non-qualifiers	Q	Qualified	NR	National record	PB	Personal best	SB	Seasonal best	DQ	Disqualified

=== Final ===
The results were as follows

Rank	Lane	Nation	Name	Time	Notes
1st place, gold medalist(s)	4	Cuba	Zurian Hechavarría; Rose Almanza; Sahily Diago; Lisneidy Veitía	3:33.15	
2nd place, silver medalist(s)	7	Dominican Republic	Mariana Pérez; Anabel Medina; Franshina Martínez; Marileidy Paulino	3:34.27	
3rd place, bronze medalist(s)	6	Brazil	Anny de Bassi; Letícia Nonato; Jainy dos Santos; Tiffani Marinho	3:34.80	
4	8	Ecuador	Virginia Villalba; Gabriela Suárez; Evelin Mercado; Nicole Caicedo	3:35.76	SB
5	5	United States	Jada Griffin; Honour Finley; Erin Marsh; Kendall Baisden	3:35.91	
6	3	Chile	Stephanie Saavedra; Berdine Castillo; María Fernanda Mackenna; Martina Weil	3:37.00	
