= Rose Mary Almanza =

Cuban middle-distance runner

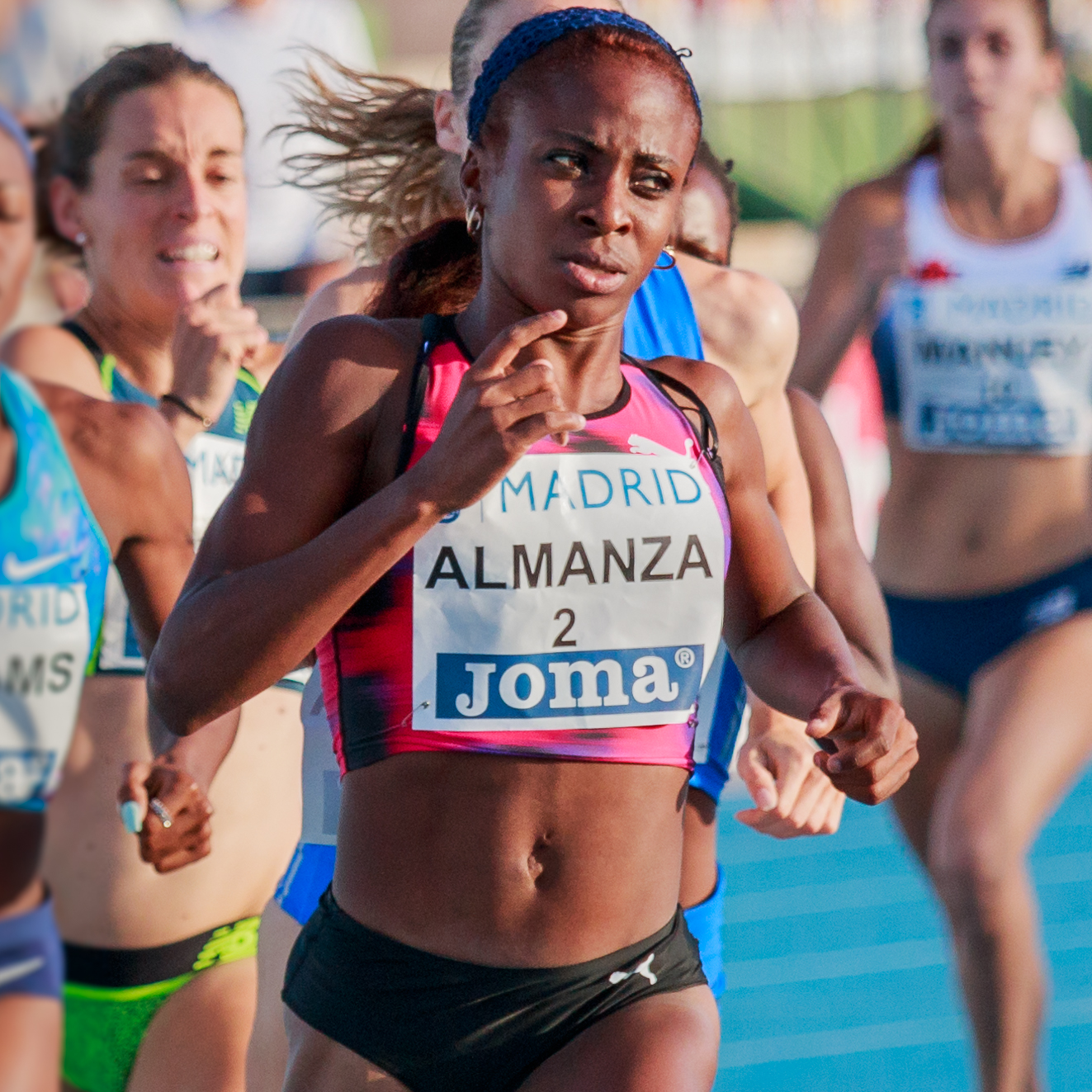
- Rose Mary Almanza in 2017

Personal information
- Full name: Rose Mary Almanza Blanco
- Born: 13 July 1992 (age 34) Camagüey, Cuba
- Height: 1.65 m (5 ft 5 in)
- Weight: 55 kg (121 lb)

Sport
- Country: Cuba
- Sport: Athletics
- Event: Middle-distance running
Medal record
Women's athletics
Representing Cuba
World Relays
Gold medal – first place	2021 Chorzów	4×400 m relay
Pan American Games
Gold medal – first place	2023 Santiago	4 x 400 m relay
Silver medal – second place	2019 Lima	800 m
Bronze medal – third place	2023 Santiago	800 m

Rose Mary Almanza Blanco (born 13 July 1992) is a Cuban middle-distance runner who competes in the 800 metres. She represented Cuba at the Pan American Games in 2011, 2015, 2019 and won medals at the Ibero-American and Central American and Caribbean Championships in Athletics.She was world champion in the 4x400 meter relay in Silesia 2021

== Career ==
Almanza ran internationally from a young age, coming fourth at the 2009 World Youth Championships in Athletics before taking the 800 m title at the Pan American Junior Championships. She won at the Barrientos Memorial in March 2010 and followed this with a personal best of 2:03.03 to take the silver medal at the 2010 Ibero-American Championships in Athletics. She ran a national junior record of 2:02.04 in Havana in July and came fourth at the 2010 World Junior Championships in Athletics.

In 2011, she improved her record further to 2:00.56 and won her first senior regional medal at the 2011 Central American and Caribbean Championships in Athletics, placing second in the 800 m behind Gabriela Medina. She came close to a medal at the 2011 Pan American Games, but was edged into fourth place in the final.

She began 2012 in strong form, taking silver medals in the 800 m and 4×400 metres relay at the Ibero-American Championships. A run of 1:59.55 in Havana was enough to gain her a place on the Cuban squad for the 2012 London Olympics.

Almanza continued to perform at a high level in subsequent years. She set a 1:57.70 personal best in 2015, participated in the 2016 Rio Olympics and won the 800m title in the 2017 Summer Universiade.

By June 2021, Almanza had returned to career-best form in the 800m, running another personal best and world-leading time of 1:56.42 in Ordizia, Spain.

== Personal bests ==
Event	Result	Venue	Date
800 m	1:56.28	Stockholm, Sweden	4 July 2021
800 m indoor	2:04.18	Eaubonne, France	9 February 2016
1500 m	4:14.53	Havana, Cuba	9 October 2014

== International competitions ==
Year	Competition	Venue	Position	Event	Notes
Representing Cuba
2009	ALBA Games	Havana, Cuba	4th	1500 m	4:30.20
2009	World Youth Championships	Bressanone, Italy	4th	800 m	2:04.31
2009	Pan American Junior Championships	Port of Spain, Trinidad and Tobago	1st	800 m	2:03.83
2010	Ibero-American Championships	San Fernando, Spain	2nd	800m	2:03.03
2010	World Junior Championships	Moncton, Canada	4th	800 m	2:02.67
2011	Central American and Caribbean Championships	Mayagüez, Puerto Rico	2nd	800m	2:02.23
2011	Pan American Games	Guadalajara, Mexico	4th	800m	2:04.82 A
2012	Ibero-American Championships	Barquisimeto, Venezuela	2nd	800 m	2:03.29
2012	Ibero-American Championships	Barquisimeto, Venezuela	2nd	4 × 400 m relay	3:29.13
2012	Olympic Games	London, United Kingdom	6th (sf)	800 m	2:01.70
2013	Central American and Caribbean Championships	Morelia, Mexico	3rd	800m	2:03.10 A
2013	World Championships	Moscow, Russia	11th (sf)	800 m	2:00.98
2014	Pan American Sports Festival	Mexico City, Mexico	1st	800 m	2:03.56 A
2014	Central American and Caribbean Games	Xalapa, Mexico	1st	800 m	2:00.79 A
2015	World Championships	Beijing, China	20th (sf)	800 m	2:00.38
2016	World Indoor Championships	Portland, United States	16th (h)	800 m	2:08.07
2016	Olympic Games	Rio de Janeiro, Brazil	26th (h)	800 m	2:00.50
2017	World Championships	London, United Kingdom	8th (sf)	800 m	1:59.79
2017	Universiade	Taipei, Taiwan	1st	800 m	2:02.21
2018	Central American and Caribbean Games	Barranquilla, Colombia	1st	800 m	2:01.63
2018	Central American and Caribbean Games	Barranquilla, Colombia	1st	1500 m	4:22.14
2018	Central American and Caribbean Games	Barranquilla, Colombia	1st	4 × 400 m relay	3:32.61
2018	NACAC Championships	Toronto, Canada	3rd	800 m	2:00.15
2019	Pan American Games	Lima, Peru	2nd	800 m	2:01.64
2019	Pan American Games	Lima, Peru	7th	1500 m	4:14.81
2019	Pan American Games	Lima, Peru	4th	4 × 400 m relay	3:30.89
2019	World Championships	Doha, Qatar	13th (sf)	800 m	2:01.18
2019	World Championships	Doha, Qatar	13th (h)	4 × 400 m relay	3:29.84
2021	World Relays	Chorzów, Poland	1st	4 × 400 m relay	3:28.41
2021	Olympic Games	Tokyo, Japan	11th (sf)	800 m	1:59.65
2021	Olympic Games	Tokyo, Japan	8th	4 × 400 m relay	3:26.92
2022	World Championships	Eugene, United States	27th (h)	800 m	2:01.96
2023	ALBA Games	Caracas, Venezuela	1st	800 m	1:59.69
2023	ALBA Games	Caracas, Venezuela	1st	1500 m	4:25.69
2023	ALBA Games	Caracas, Venezuela	1st	4 × 400 m relay	3:33.37
2023	Central American and Caribbean Games	San Salvador, El Salvador	1st	800 m	2:01.75
2023	Central American and Caribbean Games	San Salvador, El Salvador	1st	4 × 400 m relay	3:26.08
2023	World Championships	Budapest, Hungary	38th (h)	800 m	2:01.33
2023	World Championships	Budapest, Hungary	13th (h)	4 × 400 m relay	3:29.70
2023	Pan American Games	Santiago, Chile	4th	800 m	2:03.68
2024	Olympic Games	Paris, France	17th (sf)	800 m	1:58.73
