= Gena Löfstrand =

South African middle-distance runner

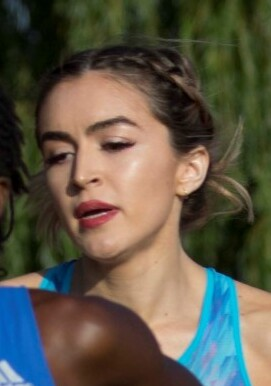

Personal information
- Born: 23 October 1995 (age 30) Durban, South Africa

Sport
- Sport: Athletics
- Event: 800 metres
- Coached by: Victor Vaz

Gena Löfstrand (born 23 October 1995) is a South African middle-distance runner. She represented her country in the 800 metres at the 2017 World Championships reaching the semifinals.

== International competitions ==
Year	Competition	Venue	Position	Event	Notes
Representing South Africa
2014	World Junior Championships	Eugene, United States	15th (sf)	800 m	2:10.40
2017	World Championships	London, United Kingdom	24th (sf)	800 m	2:03.67
2017	World Championships	London, United Kingdom	13th (h)	4 × 400 m relay	3:37.82
2018	World Cup	London, United Kingdom	7th	800 m	2:10.42
2018	World Cup	London, United Kingdom	7th	4 × 400 m relay	3:43.35
2022	African Championships	Port Louis, Mauritius	7th	800 m	2:06.21

== Personal bests ==
Outdoor

- 400 metres – 53.81 (Pretoria 2017)
- 600 metres – 1:28.32 (Pretoria 2017)
- 800 metres – 2:01.50 (Luzern 2017)
- 1500 metres – 4:28.94 (Potchefstroom 2016)
