= María C. González =

American academic and LGBT rights activist

President of the National Women's Studies Association
- In office 2002–2003
- Preceded by: Magdalena García Pinto
- Succeeded by: Colette Morrow

President of the National Association of Chicana and Chicano Studies
- In office 2022–2023

Personal details
- Born: May 22, 1959 (age 67)
- Occupation: LGBT studies scholar; LGBT rights activist

Academic background
- Education: Our Lady of the Lake University; Ohio State University
- Thesis: Toward a Feminist Identity: Contemporary Mexican-American Women Novelists (1991)
- Doctoral advisor: Marlene Longenecker

Academic work
- Institutions: University of Houston

María Carmen González (born May 22, 1959) is an American LGBT studies scholar and rights activist who was president of the National Women's Studies Association (2002-2003) and the Houston GLBT Political Caucus (2005-2006) and chair of the National Association of Chicana and Chicano Studies (2022-2023). A professor at the University of Houston, she has published one book, Contemporary Mexican-American Women Novelists: Toward a Feminist Identity (1996).

== Biography ==
González was born on May 22, 1959, to Luis N. and Carmen A. Gonzalez, and raised in El Paso. She obtained her BA (1981) and MA (1983) from Our Lady of the Lake University. Originally planning to be a lawyer while a student, she instead decided to go to Ohio State University, where she got her PhD in 1991. Her doctoral dissertation Toward a Feminist Identity: Contemporary Mexican-American Women Novelists was supervised by Marlene Longenecker.

In 1991, she joined the University of Houston Department of English as an assistant professor. She was later promoted to associate professor in 1997. At UH, Gonzalez has served as a faculty senator and as director of graduate studies.

In 1996, she published the book Contemporary Mexican-American Women Novelists: Toward a Feminist Identity, based on her Ohio State dissertation. Elizabeth Rodriguez Kessler praised the book for its focus on Chicana issues but criticized its lack of coverage of Chicana sexual identity, while also considering it "a foundation piece for a Chicana or Mexican American literature course". She was president of the National Women's Studies Association from 2002 to 2003, and later chair of the National Association of Chicana and Chicano Studies from 2022 to 2023.

An LGBT activist, she came out during her early years at UH, recalling that "[her colleagues] took it well". She was part of Annise Parker's campaign staff in 1999, and she was president of the Houston GLBT Political Caucus from 2005 to 2006. She was part of Houston's LGBT Advisory Board during Sylvester Turner's mayoralty. She also successfully advocated for the establishment of UH's LGBT minor. In 2009, she was featured in a Women's History Month article on Voice of America.
