= Raevyn Rogers =

American middle-distance runner (born 1996)

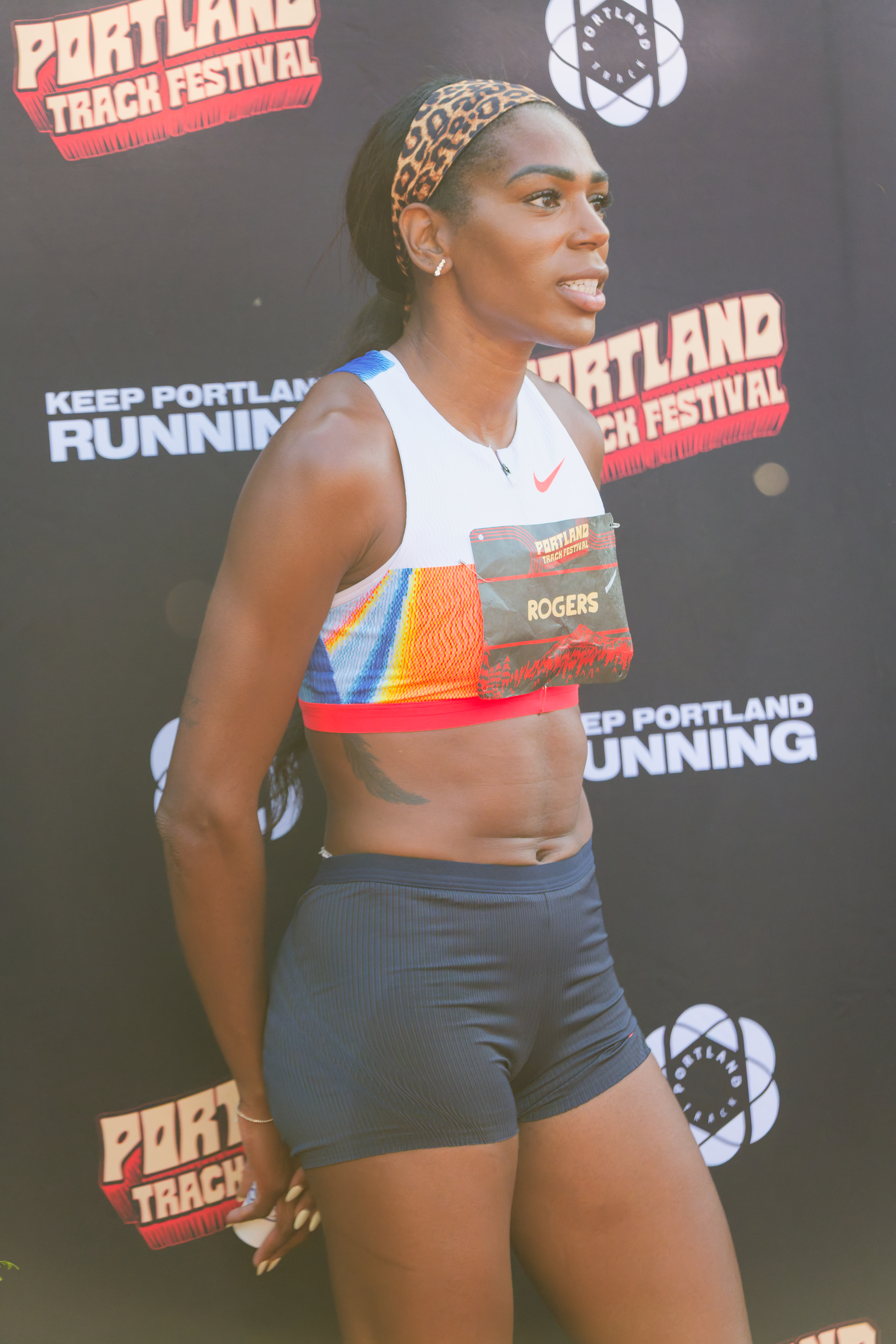
- Rogers in 2025

Personal information
- Born: September 7, 1996 (age 30) Houston, Texas, U.S.
- Home town: Houston, Texas, U.S.
- Height: 1.75 m (5 ft 9 in)

Sport
- Country: United States
- Sport: Track and field
- Event: Middle-distance running
- College team: Oregon Ducks
- Team: Nike
- Turned pro: 2017

Achievements and titles
- Olympic finals: 2020; 800 m, Bronze
- World finals: 2019; 800 m, Silver
- Personal bests: 400 m: 52.06 (Eugene 2018); 800 m: 1:56.81 (Tokyo 2021); Indoor; 800 m: 1:59.99i (Albuquerque 2018)
Medal record
Women's track and field
Representing the United States
Olympic Games
Bronze medal – third place	2020 Tokyo	800 m
World Championships
Silver medal – second place	2019 Doha	800 m
World Indoor Championships
Gold medal – first place	2018 Birmingham	4x400 m relay
World Youth Championships
Gold medal – first place	2013 Donetsk	Sprint medley relay
Bronze medal – third place	2013 Donetsk	800 m
Pan American Junior Championships
Gold medal – first place	2015 Edmonton	800 m
Gold medal – first place	2015 Edmonton	4x400 m

Raevyn Rogers (/ˈreɪvən/ RAY-vən; born September 7, 1996) is an American middle-distance athlete. She won a bronze medal in the 800 meters at the 2020 Tokyo Olympics, becoming the fourth fastest woman in U.S. history in the event. At the 2019 World Championships, Rogers came from seventh with 100m remaining in the race to place silver over USA teammate Ajeé Wilson in bronze. She earned a world indoor title as a member of national 4x400 m relay squad that took gold at the 2018 World Indoor Championships.

Rogers ran on the University of Oregon Ducks women's track and field team until 2017, when she went professional.

== Athletic career ==
=== High school ===
Rogers attended The Kinkaid School in Houston, Texas, where she competed for the Falcons. She earned a bronze medal in the 800 at the World Youth Championships in 2013, where she also ran on a medley relay that took gold. She still holds individual school records in the 200m, 400m, 800m and 1600m. She graduated in 2014.

=== University of Oregon ===
Rogers was a six-time NCAA Division I champion and ten-time All-American at University of Oregon. She won three consecutive outdoor 800 meters NCAA and Pac-12 Conference titles (2015, 2016, 2017) as well as the 2017 Women's Bowerman Award.

Rogers enjoyed a breakthrough season in her first spring with the Ducks. At the 2015 Penn Relays, Rogers ran the 400m leg of the Sprint Medley, which won the race in a time of 3:44.59, narrowly defeating Clemson University. Her win at the NCAA championships contributed 10 points to a total of 59 team points, which won the meet for Oregon for the first time since 1985. She also won the 800 at the 2015 Outdoor U.S. Junior Championships and the 2015 Pan American Junior Athletics Championships. In winning the 800-meter title at the 2015 NCAA Division I Outdoor Track and Field Championships, her time of 1:59.71 was the fastest ever run by a freshman, and the fourth-fastest run by a Duck.

Rogers produced a collegiate record at 800 meters in her third and final year with the Ducks, setting a time of 1:59.10 that smashed a 27-year-old record.

=== Subsequent years ===
She placed 4th in the 800 meters (2:00.75) at 2018 NACAC Championships in Toronto.

Rogers placed 2nd in the 800 meters at 2018 USA Outdoor Track and Field Championships at Drake University in Des Moines, Iowa.

She placed 1st in the 4 × 400 m (3:30.54 in the prelim) and 5th in the 800 m (2:01.44) at 2018 IAAF World Indoor Championships. Rogers placed 2nd in the 800 meters (2:01.74) behind champion Ajee' Wilson in Albuquerque, New Mexico, at 2018 USA Indoor Track and Field Championships.

Rogers was part of Team USA setting world indoor record in the 4 × 800 m relay February 3 at 2018 Millrose Games in 8:05.89 – Chrishuna Williams (2:05.10), Raevyn Rogers (2:00.45), Charlene Lipsey (2:01.98), Ajee' Wilson (1:58.37).

She competed in the women's 800 meters at the 2016 NACAC Under-23 Championships in Athletics, running 2:04.78 in the final round to earn fourth place.

Rogers competed in the women's 800 meters at the 2015 Pan American Junior Athletics Championships, running 2:04.62 in the final round to earn first place.

She competed in the women's 800 meters at the 2014 World Junior Championships in Athletics, running 2:08.01 in the preliminary round to rank No. 22 as a non-qualifying athlete.

Rogers competed in the women's 800 meters at the 2013 World Youth Championships in Athletics, running 2:03.32 in the final round to earn bronze medal.

== Achievements ==
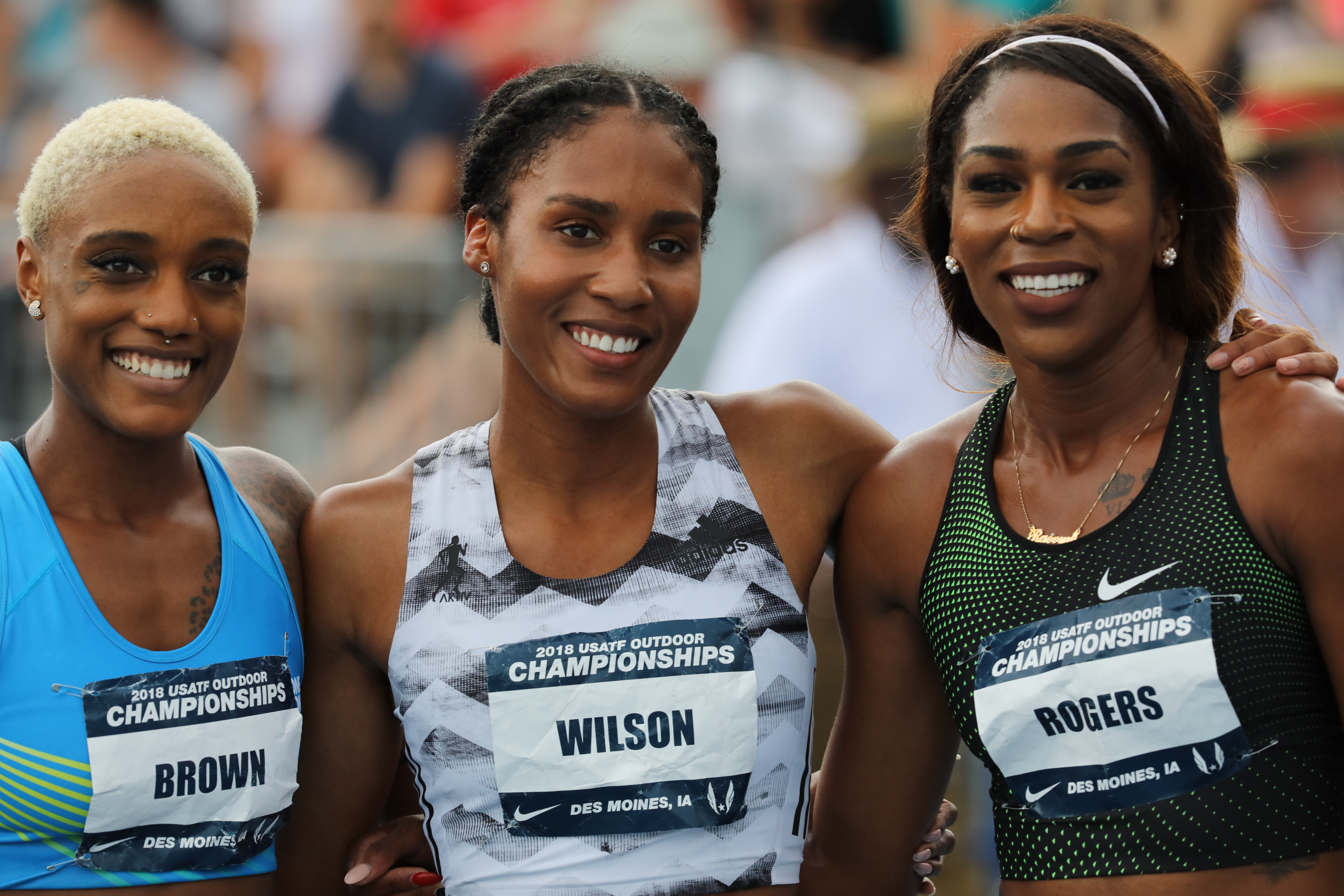
Rogers (right) at the 2018 USTAF with Ajeé Wilson and Ce'Aira Brown

=== International competitions ===
Information taken from World Athletics profile.

Representing the United States
Year	Competition	Venue	Position	Event	Notes
2023	World Athletics Championships	Budapest, Hungary	4th	800 m	1:57.45
2022	World Athletics Championships	Eugene, OR, United States	6th	800 m	1:58.26
2021	Olympic Games	Tokyo, Japan	3rd	800 m	1:56.81 PB
2021	Prefontaine Classic	Eugene, OR, United States	4th	800 m	1:58.01
2019	World Championships	Doha, Qatar	2nd	800 m	1:58.18
2019	Prefontaine Classic	Eugene, OR, United States	3rd	800 m	1:58.65
2018	NACAC Championships	Toronto, Canada	4th	800 m	2:00.75
2018	World Indoor Championships	Birmingham, United Kingdom	5th	800 m	2:01.44
2018	World Indoor Championships	Birmingham, United Kingdom	1st	4x400 m	3:30.54 (p)
2016	NACAC U23 Championships	San Salvador, El Salvador	4th	800 m	2:04.78
2016	Millrose Games	New York, NY, United States	4th	800 m	2:00.90
2015	Pan American U20 Championships	Edmonton, AB, Canada	1st	800 m	2:04.62
2014	World U20 Championships	Eugene, OR, United States	22nd	800 m	2:08.01
2013	World Youth Championships	Donetsk, Ukraine	3rd	800 m	2:03.32
2013	World Youth Championships	Donetsk, Ukraine	1st	medley relay	2:05.15

=== US Track & Field Championships ===
Year	Competition	Venue	Position	Event	Notes
Representing Nike
2024	USA Olympic Trials	Eugene, Oregon	7th	800 metres	2:01.12
2023	USA Outdoor Track and Field Championships	Eugene, Oregon	2nd	800 metres	1:59.83
2022	USA Outdoor Track and Field Championships	Eugene, Oregon	3rd	800 metres	1:57.96
2021	USA Olympic Trials	Eugene, Oregon	2nd	800 metres	1:57.66
2019	USA Outdoor Track and Field Championships	Des Moines, Iowa	3rd	800 metres	1:58.84
2018	USA Outdoor Track and Field Championships	Des Moines, Iowa	2nd	800 metres	1:58.57
2018	USA Indoor Track and Field Championships	Albuquerque, New Mexico	2nd	800 metres	2:01.74
Representing Oregon Ducks
2017	USA Outdoor Track and Field Championships	Sacramento, California	4th	800 metres	2:00.18
2016	USA Olympic Trials	Eugene, Oregon	5th	800 metres	2:00.59
2015	US Junior Outdoor Track and Field Championships	University of Oregon	1st	800 metres	2:06.64
Unattached
2014	US World Junior Trials	University of Oregon	1st	800 metres	2:04.40
2013	US World Youth Trials	University of Evansville	1st	800 metres	2:05.33

=== University of Oregon ===
Sources.

Oregon	Mountain Pacific Sports Federation Indoor track and field	NCAA Indoor track and field	Pac-12 Conference Outdoor Track and Field	NCAA Outdoor Track and Field
Junior 16–17	800: DNF	800: 2:01.09 1st	800: 2:02.93 1st	800: 2:00.02 1st
Junior 16–17		4x400 meters: 3:27.07 2nd	4x400 meters: 3:32.20 2nd	4x400 meters: 3:33.13 1st
Sophomore 15–16		800: 2:03.13 1st	800: 2:02.41 1st	800: 2:00.75 1st
Sophomore 15–16		4x400 meters: 3:29.77 3rd		4x400 meters: DNF
Sophomore 15–16		Distance medley relay: 11:05.96 7th		
Freshman 14–15	800: 2:06.50 6th		800: 2:01.67 1st	800: 1:59.71 1st
Freshman 14–15			4x400 meters: 3:34.73 2nd	4x400 meters: 3:39.07 18th

=== Personal bests ===
Event	Time	Wind	Year
200 meters	24.56	+3.0 m/s	2015
400 meters	52.06		2018
400m relay split	49.77		2017
800 meters	1:56.81		2021
400 m indoor	52.24		2018
600 m indoor	1:24.88		2019
800 m indoor	1:59.99		2018

Awards
Preceded by Courtney Okolo	The Bowerman (women's winner); 2017	Succeeded by Keturah Orji
