= Athletics at the 2023 ALBA Games =

Athletics at the V ALBA Games
- Dates: April 26-29
- Host city: Caracas, Venezuela
- Venue: Academia Militar de la Guardia Nacional Bolivariana
- Level: Senior

Athletics competitions at the 2023 ALBA Games were held at the 5-lane Pista de Atletismo de la Academia Militar de la Guardia Nacional Bolivariana in Caracas, Venezuela, between 26 and 29 April.

== Medal summary ==
=== Men ===
Event	Gold		Silver		Bronze	
100 metres	Reynaldo Espinoza (CUB)	10.26	Alexis Nieves (VEN)	10.41	David Vivas (VEN)	10.43
200 metres	Reynaldo Espinoza (CUB)	21.06	Alexis Nieves (VEN)	21.10	Yoandris Lescay (CUB)	21.21
400 metres	Kelvis Padrino (VEN)	45.75	Javier Gómez (VEN)	46.80	Julio Rodríguez (VEN)	47.49
800 metres	José Maita (VEN)	1:47.55	Ryan López (VEN)	1:48.15	Sebastián López (VEN)	1:49.52
1500 metres	Sebastián López (VEN)	3:54.60	Gabriel Guzmán (VEN)	3:55.69	Lucirio Antonio Garrido (VEN)	3:55.81
5000 metres	Gabriel Guzmán (VEN)	14:59.11	Lucirio Antonio Garrido (VEN)	15:11.57	Oliver Díaz (VEN)	15:14.88
10,000 metres	Whinton Palma (VEN)	30:58.59	Yonny Pozas (VEN)	32:07.95	Damaso Davila (NCA)	35:09.16
110 metres hurdles	Georni Jaramillo (VEN)	14.56	Samuel Cedeño (VEN)	14.71	Glen McCoy (NCA)	16.49
400 metres hurdles	Yoao Illas (CUB)	50.11	Julio Rodríguez (VEN)	51.42	César Parra (VEN)	52.12
3000 metres steeplechase	José Peña (VEN)	9:09.15	Diego Caldeira (VEN)	9:14.46	Marcial Rodríguez (NCA)	10:07.76
4 x 100 metres relay	Venezuela; Alexis Nieves; Bryant Alamo; David Vivas; Jesús Rafael Vásquez	39.68	Saint Kitts and Nevis; Cacious Mason; Datryehl Stanley; Queleel Roberts; Shameri Newton	41.37	Saint Vincent and the Grenadines; Andrus Dennie; Emmanuel Kile; Ferdinand Malique; Winston Darren	41.47
4 x 400 metres relay	Venezuela "A"; Luis Rodríguez; Javier Gómez; Kelvis Padrino; José Maita	3:07.89	Venezuela "B"; Carlos Belisario; Ryan López; Daniel Ríos; Julio Rodríguez	3:15.72	Saint Vincent and the Grenadines; Winston Darren; Andrus Dennie; Sam Verrol; Emmanuel Kile	3:20.03
High jump	Sam Verrol (VIN)	2.00	Hector Añez (VEN)	1.95	Nathan Telemaque (DMA)	1.90
Pole vault	Eduardo Nápoles (CUB); Ricardo Montes de Oca (VEN)	5.20	Not awarded		Reinaldo Mendoza (VEN)	4.50
Long jump	Alejandro Parada (CUB)	7.87	Leodan Torrealba (VEN)	7.72	William Landin (VEN)	6.71
Triple jump	Cristian Nápoles (CUB)	17.23	Andy Hechavarría (CUB)	16.69	Leodan Torrealba (VEN)	16.50
Shot put	Juan Carley Vázquez (CUB)	17.56	Mario González (VEN)	17.23	Georni Jaramillo (VEN)	14.53
Discus throw	Mario Alberto Díaz (CUB)	63.64	Jorge Fernández (CUB)	61.88	Georni Jaramillo (VEN)	45.18
Hammer throw	Yasmani Fernández (CUB)	69.41	Carlos Arteaga (NCA)	59.98 NR	Alberto Wikleman (VEN)	56.67
Javelin throw	Carlos Cordoba (VEN)	61.22	Abraham D. Piamo (VEN)	53.96	Addison James (DMA)	51.97
Decathlon	Yan Carlos Hernández (CUB)	7329	Briander Rivero (CUB)	7229	Carlos Cordoba (VEN)	6670

=== Women ===
Event	Gold		Silver		Bronze	
100 metres	Yunisleidy García (CUB)	11.22	Yarima García (CUB)	11.51	Orangys Jiménez (VEN)	11.56
200 metres	Yunisleidy García (CUB)	23.00	Orangys Jiménez (VEN)	23.06	Yarima García (CUB)	23.38
400 metres	Roxana Gómez (CUB)	50.73	Lisneidy Veitía (CUB)	52.49	Wilismar Padrón (VEN)	54.58
800 metres	Rose Mary Almanza (CUB)	1:59.69	Daily Cooper (CUB)	2:04.90	María Rojas (VEN)	2:09.50
1500 metres	Rose Mary Almanza (CUB)	4:25.69	Daily Cooper (CUB)	4:27.23	María Garrido (VEN)	4:28.84
5000 metres	Anisleidis Ochoa (CUB)	16:43.99	Jhoselyn Camargo (BOL)	16:49.11	María Garrido (VEN)	17:16.98
10,000 metres	Anisleidis Ochoa (CUB)	35:11.41	Jhoselyn Camargo (BOL)	35:32.17	Magaly García (VEN)	36:00.39
100 metres hurdles	Keily Pérez (CUB)	13.84	Mariangelic Rojas (VEN)	14.84	Only two finishers	
400 metres hurdles	Wilismar Padrón (VEN)	59.84	Genesis Gutiérrez (VEN)	60.60	Alinson Lovo (NCA)	66.65
3000 metres steeplechase	María Tirado (VEN)	11:04.37	Camila Hernández (VEN)	11:27.06	Only two finishers	
4 x 100 metres relay	Cuba; Keily Pérez; Yarima García; Yunisleidy García; Davisleidis Velazco	44.46	Nicaragua; Ana Bermúdez; Andrea Sosa; Ireschell Villareal; María Carmona	48.97	Only two finishers	
4 x 400 metres relay	Cuba; Lisneidy Veitía; Rose Mary Almanza; Daily Cooper; Roxana Gómez	3:33.37	Venezuela "A"; Wilismar Padrón; Genesis Gutiérrez; Ana Torin; Ibellis Romero	3:44.95	Venezuela "B"; Leonela Vera; Raimari Alborno; Yanuelys Montilla; Linda Pirela	3:45.96
High jump	Ariana Gutiérrez (VEN)	1.71	Ornelis Ortiz (VEN)	1.69	Mariangelic Rojas (VEN)	1.55
Pole vault	Robeilys Peinado (VEN)	4.20	Sharik Fontecha (VEN)	3.40	Only two finishers	
Long jump	Eliannys Chourio (VEN)	5.91	Fabiana Morales (VEN)	5.75	Jahzar Claxton (SKN)	5.67
Triple jump	Davisleidis Velazco (CUB)	13.83	Mairy Pires (VEN)	13.29	Only two starters	
Shot put	Ahymará Espinoza (VEN)	15.36	Angie Barboza (VEN)	13.07	Luisanyz Fuentes (VEN)	12.43
Discus throw	Silinda Morales (CUB)	61.73	Yerilda Zapata (VEN)	50.22	Alika St. John (DMA)	40.67
Hammer throw	Yaritza Martínez (CUB)	64.88	Silennys Vargas (VEN)	56.64	Yenniver Veroe (VEN)	53.74
Javelin throw	Jahzar Claxton (SKN)	43.34 NR	Angie Barboza (VEN)	40.88	Only two starters	
Heptathlon	Marys Patterson (CUB)	5767	Ana Sánchez (NCA)	3086	Only two starters	

=== Mixed ===
Event	Gold		Silver		Bronze	
4 x 400 metres relay	Cuba; Yoao Illas; Lisneidy Veitía; Yoandris Lescay; Roxana Gómez	3:17.33	Venezuela "A"; Kelvis Padrino; Ibeyis Romero; José Maita; Wilismar Padrón	3:23.17	Venezuela "B"; Daniel Ríos; Yanuelys Montilla; Ryan López; Linda Pirela	3:32.08

== Medal table ==
* Host nation (Venezuela)

Rank	Nation	Gold	Silver	Bronze	Total
1	Cuba	23	7	2	32
2	Venezuela*	17	0	24	41
3	Nicaragua	0	2	4	6
4	Bolivia	0	2	0	2
5	Saint Kitts and Nevis	0	1	1	2
6	Dominica	0	0	3	3
Totals (6 entries)		40	12	34	86
