= Athletics at the 2023 Pan American Games – Women's 800 metres =

Women's 800 metres at the 2023 Pan American Games
- Venue: Julio Martínez National Stadium
- Dates: November 3 – November 4
- Competitors: 11 from 9 nations
- Winning time: 2:02.71

Medalists
Gold medal	Sahily Diago	Cuba
Silver medal	Déborah Rodríguez	Uruguay
Bronze medal	Rose Almanza	Cuba

The women's 800 metres competition of the athletics events at the 2023 Pan American Games was held on November 3 - 4 at the Julio Martínez National Stadium of Santiago, Chile.

== Records ==
Prior to this competition, the existing world and Pan American Games records were as follows:

World record	Jarmila Kratochvilova (CZE)	1:53.28	Munich, Germany	July 26, 1983
Pan American Games record	Ana Quirot (CUB)	1:58.71	Havana, Cuba	August 8, 1991

== Schedule ==
Date	Time	Round
November 3, 2023	17:10	Semifinal
November 4, 2023	19:00	Final

== Results ==
All times shown are in seconds.

KEY:	q	Fastest non-qualifiers	Q	Qualified	NR	National record	PB	Personal best	SB	Seasonal best	DQ	Disqualified

=== Semifinal ===
Qualification: First 3 in each heat (Q) and next 2 fastest (q) qualified for the final.

Rank	Heat	Name	Nationality	Time	Notes
1	1	Rose Almanza	Cuba	2:02.87	Q
2	1	Jaqueline Weber	Brazil	2:04.12	Q
3	1	Déborah Rodríguez	Uruguay	2:04.70	PB
4	2	Sahily Diago	Cuba	2:05.71	Q
5	1	Brooke Feldmeier	United States	2:06.37	q
6	2	Addy Townsend	Canada	2:06.62	Q
7	2	Brenna Detra	United States	2:06.77	Q
8	2	Berdine Castillo	Chile	2:07.03	q
9	1	Sonia Gaskin	Barbados	2:08.14	
10	2	Aziza Ayoub	Puerto Rico	2:08.57	
11	2	Luisa Real	Mexico	2:08.84	

=== Final ===
The results were as follows

Rank	Lane	Name	Nationality	Time	Notes
1st place, gold medalist(s)	5	Sahily Diago	Cuba	2:02.71	
2nd place, silver medalist(s)	8	Déborah Rodríguez	Uruguay	2:02.88	PB
3rd place, bronze medalist(s)	4	Rose Almanza	Cuba	2:03.68	
4	6	Jaqueline Weber	Brazil	2:04.99	
5	1	Berdine Castillo	Chile	2:05.37	
6	2	Brooke Feldmeier	United States	2:06.10	
7	7	Brenna Detra	United States	2:07.27	
8	3	Addy Townsend	Canada	2:09.02	
