= Sahily Diago =

Cuban middle-distance runner

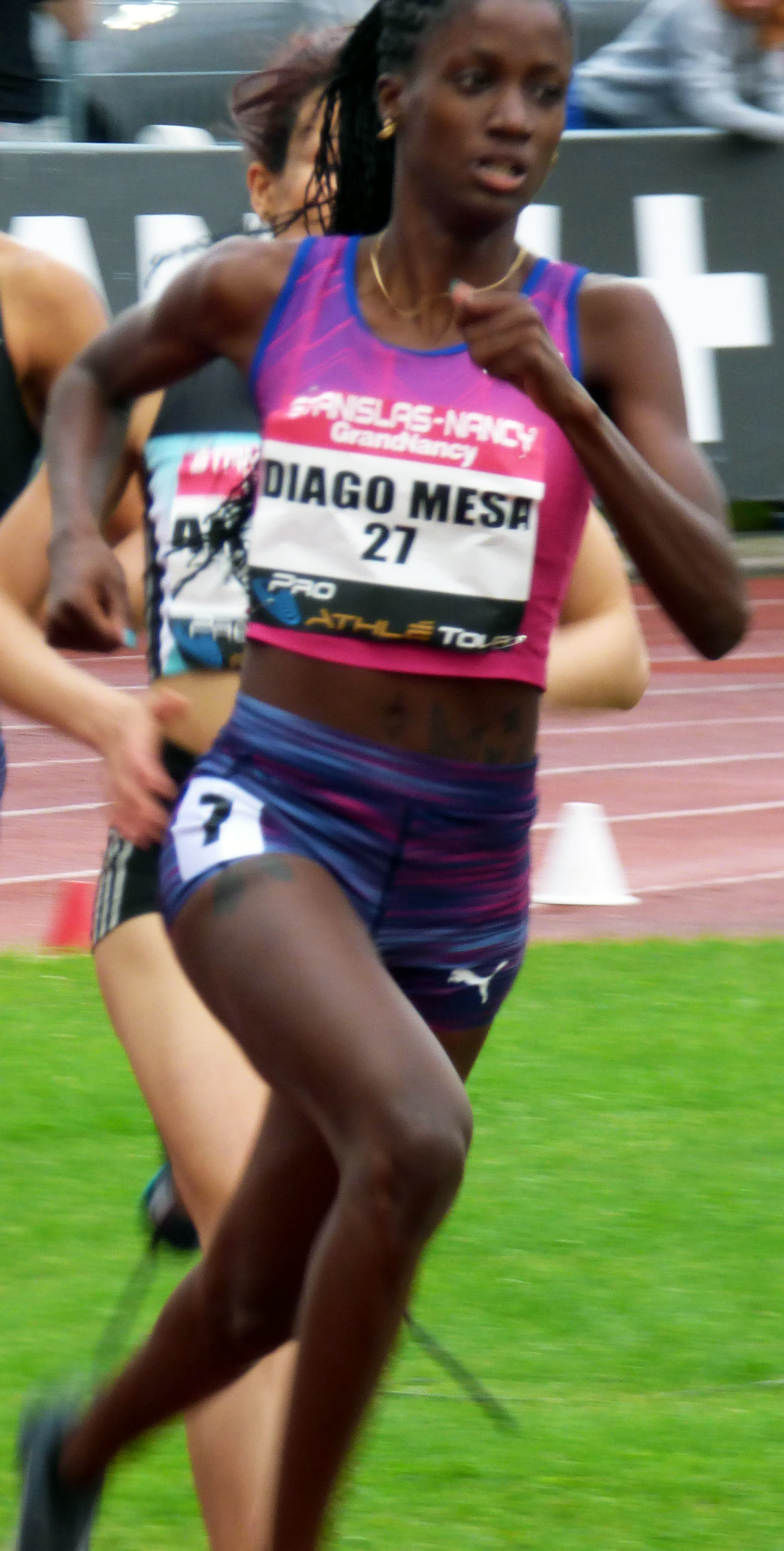
- Diago in 2016

Personal information
- Full name: Sahily Diago Mesa
- Nationality: Cuba
- Born: 26 August 1995 (age 30) Jovellanos, Matanzas, Cuba
- Height: 1.71 m (5 ft 7 in)
- Weight: 52 kg (115 lb)

Sport
- Sport: Running
- Event: Sprints

Achievements and titles
- Personal best: 800 m: 1:57.74 (La Habana 2014)
Medal record
Women's athletics
Representing Cuba
Pan American Games
Gold medal – first place	2023 Santiago	800 m
Gold medal – first place	2023 Santiago	4 x 400 m relay
World Junior Championships
Silver medal – second place	2014 Oregon	800 m
CAC Junior Championships (Junior)
Silver medal – second place	2012 San Salvador	400 m
Silver medal – second place	2012 San Salvador	800 m
- Updated on 31 December 2014

Sahily Diago Mesa (born 26 August 1995) is a Cuban middle-distance runner.

She competed for Cuba at the 2012 Summer Olympics as member of the 4×400 metres relay squad. She competed at the 2020 Summer Olympics.

== Personal bests ==
Event	Result	Venue	Date
400 m	53.76 s	Havana, Cuba	20 February 2016
800 m	1:57.74 min	Havana, Cuba	25 May 2014
1500 m	4:14.73 min	Havana, Cuba	9 October 2014

== International competitions ==
Year	Competition	Venue	Position	Event	Notes
Representing Cuba
2011	World Youth Championships	Villeneuve d'Ascq, France	5th (sf)	800 m	2:08.25
2012	Central American and Caribbean Junior Championships (U20)	San Salvador, El Salvador	2nd	400 m	54.20
2012	Central American and Caribbean Junior Championships (U20)	San Salvador, El Salvador	2nd	800 m	2:06.70
2013	Pan American Junior Championships	Medellín, Colombia	—	800 m	DQ
2014	World Junior Championships	Eugene, United States	2nd	800 m	2:02.11
2014	Pan American Sports Festival	Mexico City, Mexico	2nd	800m	2:04.30 A
2014	Continental Cup	Marrakesh, Morocco	6th	800 m	2:00.96
2014	Central American and Caribbean Games	Xalapa, Mexico	5th	800 m	2:05.51 A
2016	NACAC U23 Championships	San Salvador, El Salvador	3rd	800 m	2:04.20
2016	Olympic Games	Rio de Janeiro, Brazil	36th (h)	800 m	2:01.38
2021	Olympic Games	Tokyo, Japan	8th	4 × 400 m relay	3:26.92
2023	Central American and Caribbean Games	San Salvador, El Salvador	2nd	800 m	2:02.81
2023	Central American and Caribbean Games	San Salvador, El Salvador	2nd	1500 m	4:11.07
2023	Pan American Games	Santiago, Chile	1st	800 m	2:02.71
2024	Olympic Games	Paris, France	16th (h)	4 × 400 m relay	3:33.99
