= 2019 Prefontaine Classic =

- Dates: June 30, 2019
- Host city: Palo Alto, California, United States
- Venue: Cobb Track and Angell Field
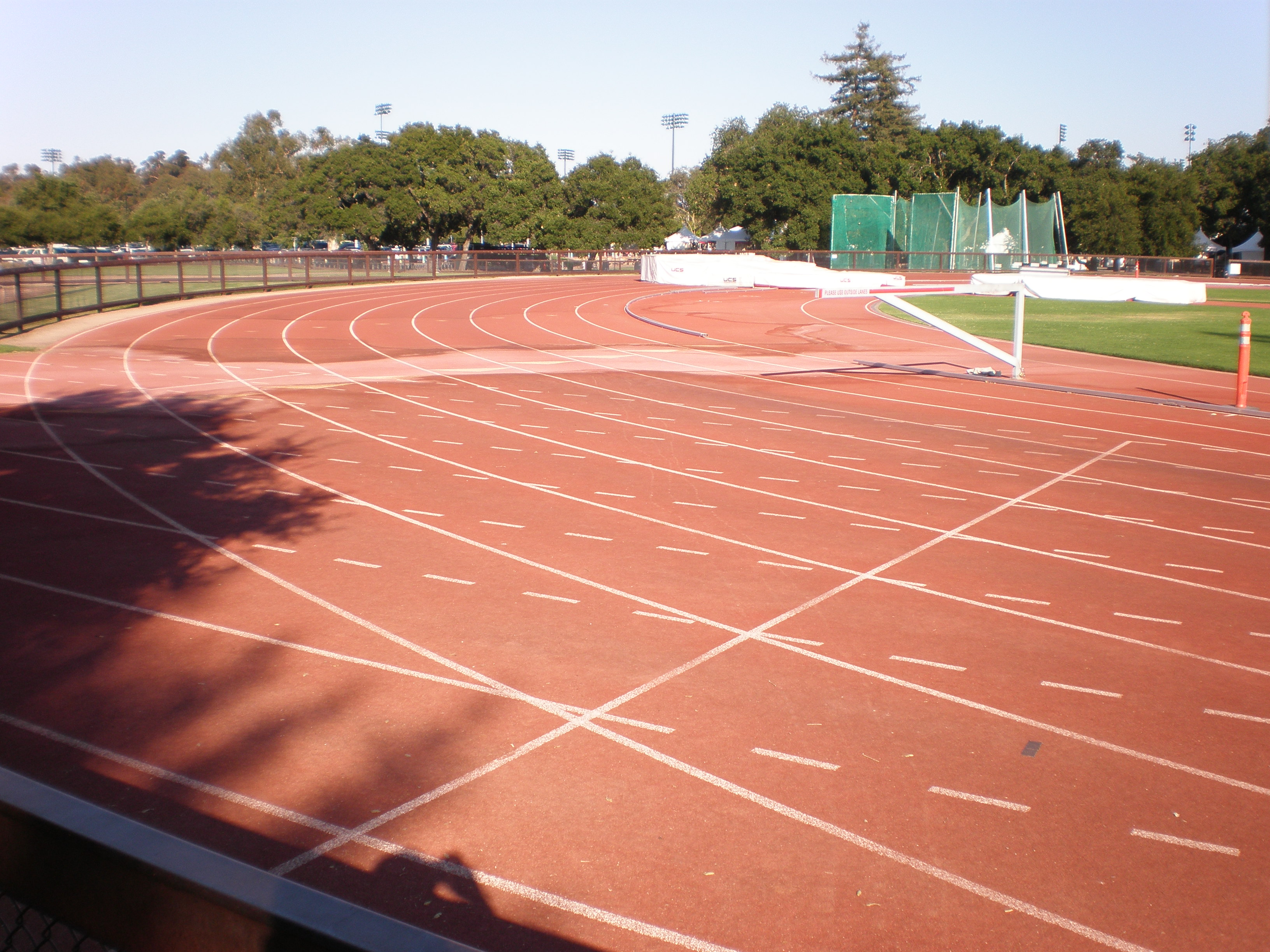
- Level: 2019 IAAF Diamond League
- Events: 13

The 2019 Prefontaine Classic was the 45th edition of the annual outdoor track and field meeting in Palo Alto, California, United States. Held on Sunday 30 June at Cobb Track and Angell Field, it was the seventh leg of the 2019 IAAF Diamond League – the highest-level international track and field circuit. The meet took place away from the regular venue at Hayward Field in Eugene, Oregon, as the location was under renovation in preparation for the 2021 World Athletics Championships.

A total of six world leading performances of the year were established at the competition. On the men's side, Christian Coleman won the 100 metres in 9.81 seconds, Timothy Cheruiyot set a time of 3:50.49 to win the 1500 metres, Rai Benjamin won the 400 metres hurdles in 47.16 seconds, and Joshua Cheptegei won the non-Diamond League two miles in 8:07.54 minutes. On the women's side, Sifan Hassan gave the outstanding performance of the meet with a 3000 metres win in 8:18.49 minutes – which was also a European record and Diamond League record time. Beatrice Chepkoech was also a world-leader with 8:55.58 minutes in the 3000 metres steeplechase. Darlan Romani set a South American record of 22.61 m to win the men's shot put, which was also a Diamond League record.

Further to the above performances, meeting records were set in the women's 800 metres (Caster Semenya, 1:55.70 min) and high jump (Mariya Lasitskene, 2.04 m).

== Results ==
=== Men ===
100 m (−0.1 m/s)
| Place | Athlete | Time | Points |
|---|---|---|---|
| 1 | Christian Coleman (USA) | 9.81 WL | 8 |
| 2 | Justin Gatlin (USA) | 9.87 | 7 |
| 3 | Zharnel Hughes (GBR) | 9.97 | 6 |
| 4 | Cravon Gillespie (USA) | 10.05 | 5 |
| 5 | Mike Rodgers (USA) | 10.08 | 4 |
| 6 | Arthur Cissé (CIV) | 10.12 | 3 |
| 7 | Filippo Tortu (ITA) | 10.21 | 2 |
| 8 | Cameron Burrell (USA) | 10.21 | 1 |

400 m
| Place | Athlete | Time | Points |
|---|---|---|---|
| 1 | Michael Norman (USA) | 44.62 | 8 |
| 2 | Kahmari Montgomery (USA) | 45.12 | 7 |
| 3 | Fred Kerley (USA) | 45.33 | 6 |
| 4 | Jonathan Jones (BAR) | 45.46 | 5 |
| 5 | Wil London (USA) | 45.57 | 4 |
| 6 | Machel Cedenio (TTO) | 45.71 | 3 |
| 7 | Michael Cherry (USA) | 45.92 | 2 |
| ^{[a]} | Bralon Taplin (GRN) | ~~45.94~~ | ~~1~~ |

Mile
| Place | Athlete | Time | Points |
|---|---|---|---|
| 1 | Timothy Cheruiyot (KEN) | 3:50.49 WL | 8 |
| 2 | Ayanleh Souleiman (DJI) | 3:51.22 | 7 |
| 3 | Filip Ingebrigtsen (NOR) | 3:51.28 PB | 6 |
| 4 | Jakob Ingebrigtsen (NOR) | 3:51.30 PB | 5 |
| 5 | Craig Engels (USA) | 3:51.60 PB | 4 |
| 6 | Matthew Centrowitz Jr. (USA) | 3:52.26 | 3 |
| 7 | Ben Blankenship (USA) | 3:52.51 PB | 2 |
| 8 | Samuel Tefera (ETH) | 3:53.50 | 1 |

110 m hurdles (+0.3 m/s)
| Place | Athlete | Time | Points |
|---|---|---|---|
| 1 | Orlando Ortega (ESP) | 13.24 | 8 |
| 2 | Wilhem Belocian (FRA) | 13.29 | 7 |
| 3 | Omar McLeod (JAM) | 13.29 | 6 |
| 4 | Ronald Levy (JAM) | 13.30 | 5 |
| 5 | Devon Allen (USA) | 13.33 | 4 |
| 6 | Xie Wenjun (CHN) | 13.36 | 3 |
| 7 | Freddie Crittenden (USA) | 13.38 | 2 |
| 8 | Aleec Harris (USA) | 13.39 | 1 |

400 m hurdles
| Place | Athlete | Time | Points |
|---|---|---|---|
| 1 | Rai Benjamin (USA) | 47.16 WL MR | 8 |
| 2 | Kyron McMaster (IVB) | 48.94 | 7 |
| 3 | Yasmani Copello (TUR) | 49.37 | 6 |
| 4 | David Kendziera (USA) | 49.46 | 5 |
| 5 | TJ Holmes (USA) | 49.79 | 4 |
| 6 | Khallifah Rosser (USA) | 49.87 | 3 |
| 7 | Amere Lattin (USA) | 50.01 | 2 |
| 8 | Ludvy Vaillant (FRA) | 50.23 | 1 |

Pole vault
| Place | Athlete | Mark | Points |
|---|---|---|---|
| 1 | Armand Duplantis (SWE) | 5.93 m | 8 |
| 2 | Sam Kendricks (USA) | 5.88 m | 7 |
| 3 | Piotr Lisek (POL) | 5.71 m | 6 |
| 4 | Chris Nilsen (USA) | 5.71 m | 5 |
| 5 | Cole Walsh (USA) | 5.61 m | 4 |
| 6 | Valentin Lavillenie (FRA) | 5.61 m | 3 |
| 7 | Thiago Braz da Silva (BRA) | 5.61 m | 2 |
| 8 | Renaud Lavillenie (FRA) | 5.46 m | 1 |

Shot put
| Place | Athlete | Mark | Points |
|---|---|---|---|
| 1 | Darlan Romani (BRA) | 22.61 m MR DLR AR | 8 |
| 2 | Ryan Crouser (USA) | 22.17 m | 7 |
| 3 | Tom Walsh (NZL) | 21.76 m | 6 |
| 4 | Michał Haratyk (POL) | 21.61 m | 5 |
| 5 | Joe Kovacs (USA) | 21.39 m | 4 |
| 6 | Darrell Hill (USA) | 21.35 m | 3 |
| 7 | Tomáš Staněk (CZE) | 20.77 m | 2 |
| 8 | Payton Otterdahl (USA) | 20.58 m | 1 |

- ^{400 metres} Bralon Taplin of Grenada was disqualified for doping violations.

=== Women ===
200 m (+1.9 m/s)
| Place | Athlete | Time | Points |
|---|---|---|---|
| 1 | Blessing Okagbare (NGR) | 22.05 | 8 |
| 2 | Elaine Thompson (JAM) | 22.21 | 7 |
| 3 | Dina Asher-Smith (GBR) | 22.42 | 6 |
| 4 | Salwa Eid Naser (BHR) | 22.51 PB | 5 |
| 5 | Jenna Prandini (USA) | 22.53 | 4 |
| 6 | Dafne Schippers (NED) | 22.62 | 3 |
| 7 | Brittany Brown (USA) | 22.99 | 2 |
| 8 | Kyra Jefferson (USA) | 23.07 | 1 |

800 m
| Place | Athlete | Time | Points |
|---|---|---|---|
| 1 | Caster Semenya (RSA) | 1:55.70 MR | 8 |
| 2 | Ajeé Wilson (USA) | 1:58.36 | 7 |
| 3 | Raevyn Rogers (USA) | 1:58.65 | 6 |
| 4 | Hanna Green (USA) | 1:58.75 PB | 5 |
| 5 | Habitam Alemu (ETH) | 1:59.25 | 4 |
| 6 | Natoya Goule (JAM) | 1:59.82 | 3 |
| 7 | Wang Chunyu (CHN) | 2:05.68 | 2 |
| 8 | Nataliya Pryshchepa (UKR) | 2:50.33 | 1 |

3000 m
| Place | Athlete | Time | Points |
|---|---|---|---|
| 1 | Sifan Hassan (NED) | 8:18.49 WL MR DLR AR | 8 |
| 2 | Konstanze Klosterhalfen (GER) | 8:20.07 PB | 7 |
| 3 | Letesenbet Gidey (ETH) | 8:20.27 PB | 6 |
| 4 | Genzebe Dibaba (ETH) | 8:21.29 PB | 5 |
| 5 | Laura Weightman (GBR) | 8:26.07 PB | 4 |
| 6 | Hellen Obiri (KEN) | 8:27.26 | 3 |
| 7 | Agnes Jebet Tirop (KEN) | 8:27.51 PB | 2 |
| 8 | Caroline Chepkoech Kipkirui (KEN) | 8:31.45 | 1 |

3000 m steeplechase
| Place | Athlete | Time | Points |
|---|---|---|---|
| 1 | Beatrice Chepkoech (KEN) | 8:55.58 WL MR | 8 |
| 2 | Emma Coburn (USA) | 9:04.90 | 7 |
| 3 | Hyvin Jepkemoi (KEN) | 9:05.81 | 6 |
| 4 | Daisy Jepkemei (KEN) | 9:08.45 PB | 5 |
| 5 | Courtney Frerichs (USA) | 9:09.75 | 4 |
| 6 | Winfred Yavi (BHR) | 9:27.76 | 3 |
| 7 | Karoline Bjerkeli Grøvdal (NOR) | 9:29.94 | 2 |
| 8 | Purity Cherotich Kirui (KEN) | 9:39.23 | 1 |

High jump
| Place | Athlete | Mark | Points |
|---|---|---|---|
| 1 | Mariya Lasitskene | 2.04 m MR | 8 |
| 2 | Vashti Cunningham (USA) | 2.00 m PB | 7 |
| 3 | Yaroslava Mahuchikh (UKR) | 2.00 m PB | 6 |
| 4 | Yuliya Levchenko (UKR) | 1.95 m | 5 |
| 5 | Erika Kinsey (SWE) | 1.95 m | 4 |
| 6 | Levern Spencer (LCA) | 1.92 m | 3 |
| 7 | Nicola McDermott (AUS) | 1.88 m | 2 |

Shot put
| Place | Athlete | Mark | Points |
|---|---|---|---|
| 1 | Gong Lijiao (CHN) | 19.79 m | 8 |
| 2 | Danniel Thomas-Dodd (JAM) | 19.26 m | 7 |
| 3 | Chase Ealey (USA) | 19.23 m | 6 |
| 4 | Aliona Dubitskaya (BLR) | 18.98 m | 5 |
| 5 | Christina Schwanitz (GER) | 18.77 m | 4 |
| 6 | Michelle Carter (USA) | 18.21 m | 3 |
| 7 | Magdalyn Ewen (USA) | 18.04 m | 2 |
| 8 | Paulina Guba (POL) | 17.54 m | 1 |

== Non-Diamond League results ==
=== Men ===
| Event | First | | Second | | Third | |
|---|---|---|---|---|---|---|
| Two miles | Joshua Cheptegei (UGA) | 8:07.54 PB WL | Paul Chelimo (USA) | 8:07.59 PB | Selemon Barega (ETH) | 8:08.69 WU20R |

=== Women ===
| Event | First | | Second | | Third | |
|---|---|---|---|---|---|---|
| 100 metres | Marie-Josée Ta Lou (CIV) | 11.02 | Aleia Hobbs (USA) | 11.04 | Teahna Daniels (USA) | 11.13 |
| 1500 metres | Faith Kipyegon (KEN) | 3:59.04 | Laura Muir (GBR) | 3:59.47 | Shelby Houlihan (USA) | 3:59.64 |
