= Lisneidy Veitía =

Cuban sprinter (born 1994)

Personal information
- Nationality: Cuban
- Born: 29 April 1994 (age 32)

Sport
- Country: Cuba
- Sport: Track and field
- Event: 400 metres
Medal record
Women's athletics
Representing Cuba
Pan American Games
Gold medal – first place	2023 Santiago	4 x 400 m relay
World Relays
Gold medal – first place	2021 Chorzów	4×400 m relay

Lisneidy Inés Veitía Córdova (born 29 April 1994) is a Cuban sprinter. She competed in the 400 metres event at the 2015 World Championships in Athletics in Beijing, China. She was born in Corralillo in Villa Clara Province. She was the gold medallist in the 400 metres and 4 × 400 metres relay at the 2014 Central American and Caribbean Games. She competed at the 2020 Summer Olympics.

== International competitions ==
Year	Competition	Venue	Position	Event	Notes
2010	Youth Olympic Games	Singapore	3rd (b-final)	100 m	12.15
2014	Central American and Caribbean Games	Veracruz, Mexico	1st	400 m	51.72
2014	Central American and Caribbean Games	Veracruz, Mexico	1st	4 × 400 m relay	3:29.69
2015	World Relays	Nassau, Bahamas	1st (b-final)	4 × 400 m relay	3:30.94
2015	Pan American Games	Toronto, Canada	8th	400 m	52.44
2015	Pan American Games	Toronto, Canada	4th	4 × 400 m relay	3:31.22
2015	World Championships	Beijing, China	6th (heats)	400 m	52.25
2015	NACAC Championships	San José, Costa Rica	5th	400 m	53.01
2016	Olympic Games	Rio, Brazil	8th (heats)	4 × 400 m relay	3:30.11
2021	World Relays	Chorzów, Poland	1st	4 × 400 m relay	3:28.41
2021	Olympic Games	Tokyo, Japan	8th	4 × 400 m relay	3:26.92
2022	NACAC Championships	Freeport, Bahamas	10th (h)	400 m	55.09
2023	ALBA Games	Caracas, Venezuela	2nd	400 m	52.49
2023	ALBA Games	Caracas, Venezuela	1st	4 × 400 m relay	3:33.37
2023	Central American and Caribbean Games	San Salvador, El Salvador	4th	400 m	53.52
2023	Central American and Caribbean Games	San Salvador, El Salvador	1st	4 × 400 m relay	3:26.08
2023	World Championships	Budapest, Hungary	13th (h)	4 × 400 m relay	3:29.70
2023	Pan American Games	Santiago, Chile	1st	4 × 400 m relay	3:33.15
