= Manuel Antonio (athlete) =

Angolan middle-distance runner

Personal information
- Nationality: Angolan
- Born: 3 November 1988 (age 37) Angola
- Height: 1.77 m (5 ft 9 1/2 in)
- Weight: 69 kg (152 lb)

Sport
- Sport: Track and field
- Events: 800 metres 1500 metres

Achievements and titles
- Personal bests: 800 m: 1:50.44; 1500 m: 3:52.07

Manuel André Antonio (born 3 November 1988, in Luanda) is an Angolan middle-distance runner. At the 2012 Summer Olympics, he competed in the Men's 800 metres. He also competed in the 800 metres at the 2013 World Championships.
