= Eva Hovenkamp =

Dutch sprinter

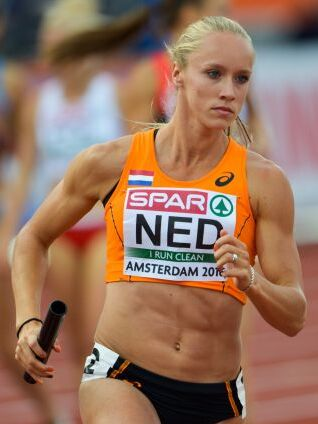
- Eva Hovenkamp in 2016

Personal information
- Nationality: Dutch
- Born: 19 July 1996 (age 29)
- Height: 1.74 m (5 ft 9 in)

Sport
- Sport: Sprinting
- Event: 4 × 400 metres

Eva Hovenkamp (Dutch: [ˈeːvaː ˈɦoːvə(ŋ)kɑmp]; born 19 July 1996) is a Dutch sprinter. She competed in the women's 4 × 400 metres relay at the 2017 World Championships in Athletics.
