= Marlene Longenecker =

American educator

- Born: August 24, 1945; Santa Monica, California
- Died: December 25, 2014 (aged 69); Redlands, California
- Occupations: College professor, educator

Marlene Blaney Longenecker (August 24, 1945 – December 25, 2014) was an American college professor and literary scholar. She was a member of the English department faculty at Ohio State University from 1972 to 2008, and director of the school's Center for Women's Studies. She was chair of the National Women's Studies Association from 1989 to 1991.

== Early life and education ==
Marlene Blaney Longenecker was born in Santa Monica, California, the daughter of Quaker parents Scott Longenecker and Ethel Blaney Longenecker. Her mother was a social worker in Los Angeles. Her maternal grandmother, Ethel Davis Blaney, was a screenwriter who married actor Keye Luke in 1942.

Longenecker graduated from Arcadia High School in 1963. She earned a bachelor's degree at the University of California at Riverside in 1967, and pursued further studies at the University at Buffalo, where she earned a PhD in 1973. Her dissertation was titled "The Landscape of Home: Wordsworth and Melville".

== Career ==
In 1972 Longenecker joined the English department at Ohio State University, where she specialized in British literature, especially Romantic poetry, and feminist theory and ecofeminism. She was director of graduate studies and vice-chair of her department. She was director of Ohio State's Center for Women's Studies from 1980 to 1986, and in the role coordinated the 1983 meeting of the National Women's Studies Association at Columbus. She retired in 2008. She gave an oral history interview for the university archives in 2013.

Longenecker was active in the civil rights and anti-war movements in the 1960s, and lived on a commune in British Columbia in 1970 and 1971. She worked as chief of staff for Dagmar Braun Celeste, wife of Ohio governor Dick Celeste, from 1986 to 1988. Longenecker was chair of the National Women's Studies Association from 1989 to 1991. As chair, she defended the NWSA's decisions and practices against charges of racism and bureaucracy, during the controversy surrounding the firing of Ruby Sales.

== Personal life ==
Longenecker died from acute myeloid leukemia in 2014, at her home in Redlands, California. Ohio State University has a Dr. Marlene B. Longenecker English Faculty Teaching and Leadership Award, named in her memory.
