= Katelyn Ayers =

Canadian long-distance runner

Personal information
- Born: 9 February 1995 (age 30)

Sport
- Country: Canada
- Sport: Long-distance running

Katelyn Ayers (born 9 February 1995) is a Canadian long-distance runner. In 2019, she competed in the senior women's race at the 2019 IAAF World Cross Country Championships held in Aarhus, Denmark. She finished in 57th place.

In 2019, she competed at the 2019 NACAC Cross Country Championships held in Port of Spain, Trinidad and Tobago. She finished in 9th place in the women's individual event.
