= Athletics at the 2026 Central American and Caribbean Games – Results =

These are the full results of the athletics competition at the 2026 Central American and Caribbean Games which took place between 2 and 8 August 2026 at Estadio Olímpico Félix Sánchez in Santo Domingo, Dominican Republic.

== Men's results ==
=== 100 metres ===
Heats – 3 August
Wind:
Heat 1: -1.2 m/s, Heat 2: -1.6 m/s, Heat 3: -0.6 m/s

Rank	Heat	Name	Nationality	Time	Notes
1	3	Bouwahjgie Nkrumie	Jamaica	10.19	Q
2	3	Melbin Marcelino	Dominican Republic	10.25	Q
3	1	Ronal Longa	Colombia	10.27	Q
4	3	Alexis Nieves	Venezuela	10.30 (.299)	q
5	3	Reynaldo Espinosa	Cuba	10.30 (.300)	q
6	2	Eloy Benitez	Puerto Rico	10.31	Q
7	2	Kevaughn Benjamin	Turks and Caicos Islands	10.33	Q
8	1	Cejhae Greene	Antigua and Barbuda	10.34	Q
9	1	Javari Thomas	Jamaica	10.35	
10	1	Franquelo Pérez	Dominican Republic	10.36 (.356)	
11	3	Carlos Flórez	Colombia	10.36 (.360)	
12	2	Nazzio John	Grenada	10.37	
13	3	Austin Kresley	Mexico	10.40	
14	3	Arturo Deliser	Panama	10.42	
15	2	Rikkoi Brathwaite	British Virgin Islands	10.44 (.434)	
16	2	Bryant Álamo	Venezuela	10.44 (.437	
17	2	Gerardo Lomeli	Mexico	10.56	
18	1	Adrián Canales	Puerto Rico	10.64 (.631)	
19	1	Georvis Domínguez	Cuba	10.64 (.639)	
20	1	Jaquone Hoyte	Barbados	10.71	
21	2	D'Angelo Huisden	Suriname	10.88	
22	1	Roberto Lerandy	Martinique	10.91	
23	3	Yeykell Romero	Nicaragua	11.19	
	2	Christopher Borzor	Haiti	DNS	

Final – 3 August

Wind: -0.6 m/s

Rank	Lane	Name	Nationality	Time	Notes
1st place, gold medalist(s)	3	Ronal Longa	Colombia	10.06	
2nd place, silver medalist(s)	6	Bouwahjgie Nkrumie	Jamaica	10.17	
3rd place, bronze medalist(s)	5	Melbin Marcelino	Dominican Republic	10.19	
4	7	Cejhae Greene	Antigua and Barbuda	10.21	
5	4	Eloy Benitez	Puerto Rico	10.22	
6	8	Reynaldo Espinosa	Cuba	10.23	
7	1	Alexis Nieves	Venezuela	10.25	
8	2	Kevaughn Benjamin	Turks and Caicos Islands	25.59	

=== 200 metres ===
Heats – 5 August
Wind:
Heat 1: +2.0 m/s, Heat 2: +2.7 m/s, Heat 3: +1.1 m/s

Rank	Heat	Name	Nationality	Time	Notes
1	1	José Figueroa	Puerto Rico	19.76	Q, NR
2	3	Alexander Ogando	Dominican Republic	20.36	Q
3	1	Ronal Longa	Colombia	20.41	Q
4	1	Kadrian Goldson	Jamaica	20.50	q
5	3	Tyquendo Tracey	Jamaica	20.51 (.503)	Q
6	2	Aaron Charles	Trinidad and Tobago	20.51 (.505)	Q
7	2	Adrián Canales	Puerto Rico	20.62	Q
8	3	Nazzio John	Grenada	20.64	q
9	3	Kuron Griffith	Barbados	20.67	
10	1	Alexis Nieves	Venezuela	20.69	
11	1	Gerardo Lomeli	Mexico	20.82	
12	3	Wanyae Belle	British Virgin Islands	20.87	
13	1	Ian Kerr	Bahamas	20.89	
14	1	Georvis Domínguez	Cuba	21.14	
15	2	Aragorn Straker	Barbados	21.22	
16	2	Roberto Lerandy	Martinique	21.23	
17	3	Arturo Deliser	Panama	21.35	
	2	José González	Dominican Republic	DQ	TR17.2.3
	2	Reynaldo Espinosa	Cuba	DQ	TR17.2.3

Final – 6 August

Wind: -2.4 m/s

Rank	Lane	Name	Nationality	Time	Notes
1st place, gold medalist(s)	6	José Figueroa	Puerto Rico	19.98	
2nd place, silver medalist(s)	5	Alexander Ogando	Dominican Republic	20.47	
3rd place, bronze medalist(s)	7	Aaron Charles	Trinidad and Tobago	20.63	
4	8	Tyquendo Tracey	Jamaica	20.66	
5	1	Kadrian Goldson	Jamaica	20.73	
6	2	Nazzio John	Grenada	21.01	
7	4	Adrián Canales	Puerto Rico	21.18	
8	3	Ronal Longa	Colombia	1:09.80	

=== 400 metres ===
Heats – 4 August

Rank	Heat	Name	Nationality	Time	Notes
1	3	Gabriel Moronta	Dominican Republic	44.79	Q
2	1	Javier Gómez	Venezuela	45.42	Q
3	2	Javier Brown	Jamaica	45.51	Q
4	2	Kirani James	Grenada	45.52	Q
5	1	Luis Avilés	Mexico	45.74	Q
6	3	Amal Glasgow	Saint Vincent and the Grenadines	45.78	Q
7	2	Valente Mendoza	Mexico	45.88	q
8	1	Kimar Farquharson	Jamaica	45.90	q
9	2	Jhonatan Hoyos	Colombia	45.99	
10	2	Lidio Andrés Feliz	Dominican Republic	46.03	
11	3	Kelvis Padrino	Venezuela	46.13	
12	1	Shakeem McKay	Trinidad and Tobago	46.14	
13	1	Alejandro Rosado	Puerto Rico	46.28	
14	3	Yohandris Bientz	Cuba	46.53	
15	1	Wendell Miller	Bahamas	47.27	
16	3	Allan Lacroix	Guadeloupe	48.36	
17	3	Desean Boyce	Barbados	52.35	
	2	Aren Spencer	Barbados	DQ	TR17.2.3

Final – 5 August

Rank	Lane	Name	Nationality	Time	Notes
1st place, gold medalist(s)	7	Gabriel Moronta	Dominican Republic	44.70	
2nd place, silver medalist(s)	8	Luis Avilés	Mexico	45.06	
3rd place, bronze medalist(s)	6	Javier Gómez	Venezuela	45.07	
4	5	Kirani James	Grenada	45.32	
5	4	Javier Brown	Jamaica	45.38	
6	3	Amal Glasgow	Saint Vincent and the Grenadines	45.76	
7	1	Kimar Farquharson	Jamaica	45.99	
8	2	Valente Mendoza	Mexico	46.22	

=== 800 metres ===
Heats – 6 August

Rank	Heat	Name	Nationality	Time	Notes
1	2	Ferdy Agramonte	Dominican Republic	1:47.03	Q
2	2	Chamar Chambers	Panama	1:47.25	Q
3	2	José Antonio Maita	Venezuela	1:47.31	Q
4	2	Niko Schultz	Puerto Rico	1:47.42	q
5	2	Nicholas Landeau	Trinidad and Tobago	1:49.58	q
6	1	Ryan Sánchez	Puerto Rico	1:49.76	Q
7	1	Jesús Tonatiú López	Mexico	1:50.16	Q
8	1	Ryan Ignaiker López	Venezuela	1:50.21	Q
9	1	Kirk Dawkins	Jamaica	1:50.54	
10	2	Nirobi Smith-Mills	Bermuda	1:53.41	
	1	Raynier Gálvez	Dominican Republic	DNS	

Final – 7 August

Rank	Name	Nationality	Time	Notes
1st place, gold medalist(s)	Ferdy Agramonte	Dominican Republic	1:46.07	NR
2nd place, silver medalist(s)	José Antonio Maita	Venezuela	1:46.10	
3rd place, bronze medalist(s)	Jesús Tonatiú López	Mexico	1:46.86	
4	Niko Schultz	Puerto Rico	1:47.09	
5	Ryan Sánchez	Puerto Rico	1:47.43	
6	Chamar Chambers	Panama	1:47.50	
7	Ryan Ignaiker López	Venezuela	1:48.16	
8	Nicholas Landeau	Trinidad and Tobago	1:53.33	

=== 1500 metres ===
7 August

Rank	Name	Nationality	Time	Notes
1st place, gold medalist(s)	Eduardo Herrera	Mexico	3:46.07	
2nd place, silver medalist(s)	Ryan Adams	Mexico	3:47.06	
3rd place, bronze medalist(s)	Hansel Abréu	Cuba	3:47.20	
4	Carlos Vilches	Puerto Rico	3:47.55	
5	Sebastián López	Venezuela	3:49.37	
6	Gabriel Guzmán	Venezuela	3:49.95	
7	Ángel Rosado	Puerto Rico	3:50.60	
8	Aarón Hernández	El Salvador	3:50.60	
9	Tayron Reyes	Dominican Republic	3:50.72	
10	Dage Minors	Bermuda	3:53.93	

=== 5000 metres ===
4 August

Rank	Name	Nationality	Time	Notes
1st place, gold medalist(s)	Eduardo Herrera	Mexico	13:50.86	
2nd place, silver medalist(s)	Víctor Ortiz	Puerto Rico	14:02.74	
3rd place, bronze medalist(s)	Pedro Marín	Colombia	14:02.80	
4	Oliver Díaz	Venezuela	14:19.54	
5	Gabriel Guzmán	Venezuela	14:27.60	
6	Diddier Rodríguez	Panama	14:29.40	
7	Carlos San Martín	Colombia	14:39.29	
8	Francisco Estévez	Cuba	14:47.41	
9	José Alejandro Tamerón	Cuba	14:55.81	
10	Ramoncito Mejía	Dominican Republic	15:17.88	
	Iker Sánchez	Mexico	DNF	

=== 10,000 metres ===
7 August

Rank	Name	Nationality	Time	Notes
1st place, gold medalist(s)	José Luis Santana	Mexico	29:28.69	
2nd place, silver medalist(s)	Héctor Pagan	Puerto Rico	29:33.79	
3rd place, bronze medalist(s)	Alberto González	Guatemala	29:45.81	
4	Francisco Estévez	Cuba	30:05.02	
5	Iván Darío González	Colombia	30:11.38	
6	Daniel Johanning	Costa Rica	30:22.51	
7	Gilberto Santana	Dominican Republic	30:26.93	
8	José Alejandro Tamerón	Cuba	31:13.04	
9	Michael Terán-Solano	Mexico	31:31.92	
10	Arnaldo Martínez	Puerto Rico	31:59.53	
	Mario Pacay	Guatemala	DNF	

=== Half marathon ===
7 August

Rank	Name	Nationality	Time	Notes
1st place, gold medalist(s)	Álvaro Abreu	Dominican Republic	1:02:48	GR, NR
2nd place, silver medalist(s)	Alberto González	Guatemala	1:04:58	
3rd place, bronze medalist(s)	Héctor Pagan	Puerto Rico	1:05:33	
4	Arnaldo Martínez	Puerto Rico	1:06:13	
5	Iván Darío González	Colombia	1:06:31	
6	Ayrton Ledesma	Mexico	1:07:07	
7	Amauri Rodríguez	Dominican Republic	1:07:21	
8	Williams Julajúj	Guatemala	1:10:57	
9	Cruz Gómez	Mexico	1:12:02	

=== 110 metres hurdles ===
Heats – 4 August
Wind:
Heat 1: -0.7 m/s, Heat 2: -1.2 m/s

Rank	Heat	Name	Nationality	Time	Notes
1	1	Sharvis Simmonds	Jamaica	13.56	Q
2	1	Jeanice Laviolette	Guadeloupe	13.70	Q
2	2	Yander Herrera	Cuba	13.70	Q
4	2	Ulric Portier	Guadeloupe	13.74	Q
5	2	John Paredes	Colombia	13.75	Q
6	1	Isaias Pie Blese	Dominican Republic	13.83	Q
7	2	Cristián Rodríguez	Dominican Republic	13.91	q
8	1	Rinaldo Moore	Trinidad and Tobago	14.03	q
9	1	Esteban Josué Ibáñez	El Salvador	14.54	
10	1	Khalian Vitalis	Saint Lucia	14.66	
	2	Justin Guy	Trinidad and Tobago	DQ	TR22.6.2[D]
	2	Shaquane Gordon	Jamaica	DNS	

Final – 5 August

Wind: +1.0 m/s

Rank	Lane	Name	Nationality	Time	Notes
1st place, gold medalist(s)	6	Ulric Portier	Guadeloupe	13.46	
2nd place, silver medalist(s)	8	Rinaldo Moore	Trinidad and Tobago	13.56	
3rd place, bronze medalist(s)	2	John Paredes	Colombia	13.57 (.567)	
4	5	Jeanice Laviolette	Guadeloupe	13.57 (.569)	
5	4	Sharvis Simmonds	Jamaica	13.61	
6	1	Cristián Rodríguez	Dominican Republic	13.63	
7	7	Isaias Pie Blese	Dominican Republic	13.78	
8	3	Yander Herrera	Cuba	14.01	

=== 400 metres hurdles ===
Heats – 3 August

Rank	Heat	Name	Nationality	Time	Notes
1	1	Malik James-King	Jamaica	49.30	Q
2	1	Yeral Núñez	Dominican Republic	49.44	Q
3	1	Pablo Andrés Ibáñez	El Salvador	49.52	Q
4	2	Gerald Drummond	Costa Rica	49.60	Q
5	2	Romario Stewart	Jamaica	49.77	Q
6	2	Diemmyx Ríos	Puerto Rico	50.02	Q
7	2	Ludvy Vaillant	Martinique	50.20	q
8	1	Guillermo Campos	Mexico	50.84	q
9	1	Yan Vázquez	Puerto Rico	51.59	
10	2	Malique Smith	United States Virgin Islands	52.56	
11	2	Juander Santos	Dominican Republic	53.23	

Final – 4 August

Rank	Lane	Name	Nationality	Time	Notes
1st place, gold medalist(s)	7	Yeral Núñez	Dominican Republic	48.30	
2nd place, silver medalist(s)	3	Pablo Andrés Ibáñez	El Salvador	49.64	
3rd place, bronze medalist(s)	2	Guillermo Campos	Mexico	49.82	
4	6	Romario Stewart	Jamaica	49.87	
5	4	Malik James-King	Jamaica	50.25	
6	1	Ludvy Vaillant	Martinique	51.64	
	5	Gerald Drummond	Costa Rica	DQ	TR22.6.1
	8	Diemmyx Ríos	Puerto Rico	DNF	

=== 3000 metres steeplechase ===
7 August

Rank	Name	Nationality	Time	Notes
1st place, gold medalist(s)	Diddier Rodríguez	Panama	8:38.81	NR
2nd place, silver medalist(s)	César Gómez	Mexico	8:39.59	
3rd place, bronze medalist(s)	Víctor Ortiz	Puerto Rico	8:39.72	
4	Carlos San Martín	Colombia	8:39.95	
5	José González	Venezuela	8:46.61	
6	Gerardo Villarreal	Mexico	8:46.93	
7	Oleisy Ferrer	Cuba	8:52.19	
8	Alexander de la Rosa	Cuba	9:28.13	

=== 4 × 100 metres relay ===
6 August

Rank	Lane	Nation	Competitors	Time	Notes
1st place, gold medalist(s)	5	Dominican Republic	Franquelo Pérez, Yohandris Andújar, Melbin Marcelino, Yancarlos Martínez	37.98	GR, NR
2nd place, silver medalist(s)	6	Jamaica	Travis Williams, Bouwahjgie Nkrumie, Javari Thomas, Tyquendo Tracey	38.08	
3rd place, bronze medalist(s)	4	Puerto Rico	Eloy Benitez, José Figueroa, Adrián Canales, Pedro Rivas	38.12	NR
4	7	Colombia	Carlos Flórez, John Paredes, Neiker Abello, Ronal Longa	38.17	NR
5	8	Cuba	Anier López, Reynaldo Espinosa, Georvis Domínguez, Yoandys Lescay	38.42	
6	1	Bahamas	Zion Campbell, Adam Musgrove, Samalie Farrington, Ian Kerr	38.62	
7	3	Venezuela	Carlos Belisario, Alexis Nieves, David Vivas, Ángel Gabriel Ramírez	38.88	NR
8	2	Barbados	Julian Forde, Kuron Griffith, Reco Griffith, Jaquone Hoyte	39.09	

=== 4 × 400 metres relay ===
7 August

Rank	Lane	Nation	Competitors	Time	Notes
1st place, gold medalist(s)	4	Puerto Rico	José Figueroa, Pedro Rivas, Alejandro Rosado, Jarell Cruz	3:00.75	NR
2nd place, silver medalist(s)	6	Dominican Republic	Gabriel Moronta, Luguelín Santos, Lidio Andrés Feliz, Yeral Núñez	3:00.94	
3rd place, bronze medalist(s)	5	Venezuela	Axel Gómez, Javier Gómez, José Antonio Maita, Kelvis Padrino	3:01.64	
4	2	Mexico	Pablo Vargas, Guillermo Campos, Valente Mendoza, Luis Avilés	3:02.23	NR
5	7	Jamaica	Kimar Farquharson, Malik James-King, Demar Francis, Romario Stewart	3:04.09	
6	8	Barbados	Kyle Gale, Jahleel Armstrong, Aaron Morris, Aren Spencer	3:04.66	
7	3	El Salvador	Pablo Andrés Ibáñez, Esteban Josué Ibáñez, Julio Martínez, Joseph Hernández	3:12.50	

=== Half marathon walk ===
2 August

Rank	Name	Nationality	Time	Notes	Penalties
1st place, gold medalist(s)	Ricardo Ortiz	Mexico	1:29:41	GR	
2nd place, silver medalist(s)	Éider Arévalo	Colombia	1:31:28		
3rd place, bronze medalist(s)	Roberto Vásquez	Mexico	1:33:56		>>
4	José Alejandro Barrondo	Guatemala	1:37:17		>>~
5	Jefferson Chacón	Venezuela	1:37:42		
6	Jhoshua Monterroso	Guatemala	1:39:25		
7	Adrián Encarnación	Dominican Republic	1:47:31		~~
8	Brailin Santana	Dominican Republic	1:55:44		>
	César Herrera	Colombia	DNF		

> Card for knee flexion
~ Card due to loss of contact

=== High jump ===
3 August

Rank	Name	Nationality	1.85	1.90	1.95	2.00	2.05	2.08	2.11	2.14	2.17	2.20	2.24	2.27	2.32	Result	Notes
1st place, gold medalist(s)	Erick Portillo	Mexico	–	–	–	–	o	–	–	xo	o	o	o	x–	xx	2.24	
2nd place, silver medalist(s)	Luis Zayas	Cuba	–	–	–	–	–	o	o	o	o	o	x–	xx		2.20	
3rd place, bronze medalist(s)	Jair Portillo	Mexico	–	–	–	–	xo	xo	o	o	xo	xxx				2.17	
3rd place, bronze medalist(s)	Marcus Gelpi	Puerto Rico	–	–	–	–	o	o	o	xxo	xo	xxx				2.17	
5	Lushane Wilson	Jamaica	–	–	–	–	–	o	o	xo	xxo	xxx				2.17	
6	Diosber Hernández	Cuba	–	–	–	o	o	xo	o	xxx						2.11	
7	Juan Ignacio Acosta	Dominican Republic	–	–	–	o	o	o	xx–	x						2.08	
7	Shaun Miller Jr.	Bahamas	–	–	–	–	o	o	xxx							2.08	
9	Luis Castro	Puerto Rico	–	–	–	o	o	xr								2.05	
9	Denceel Álvarez	Guatemala	o	o	o	o	xxo	–	xxx							2.05	
11	Kenny Tavarez	Dominican Republic	–	o	o	xxx										1.95	
12	Ariel Molina	El Salvador	–	xxo	xxx											1.90	
13	David Hall	Turks and Caicos Islands	xo	xxx												1.85	

=== Pole vault ===
6 August

Rank	Name	Nationality	4.35	4.50	4.65	4.80	4.95	5.10	5.20	5.30	5.50	Result	Notes
1st place, gold medalist(s)	Ricardo Montes de Oca	Venezuela	–	–	–	–	–	o	o	xo	xxx	5.30	
2nd place, silver medalist(s)	Jorge Montes	Dominican Republic	–	–	xo	o	o	xo	o	xxx		5.20	=NR
3rd place, bronze medalist(s)	Brenden Vanderpool	Bahamas	–	–	–	–	–	xo	xxx			5.10	
4	Nico Morales	Puerto Rico	–	–	–	xo	o	xxx				4.95	
5	Tyler Cash	Bahamas	–	o	o	xo	xxo	xxx				4.95	
6	Josmi Sánchez	Cuba	–	–	xo	xo	xxx					4.80	
7	Carlo Cruz	Mexico	–	–	o	xxo	xxx					4.80	
8	Daniel Machado	El Salvador	o	o	xo	xxx						4.65	
	Liván Torres	Cuba	–	–	–	–	xxx					NM	
	Louis Martínez	Puerto Rico	–	–	–	xxx						NM	
	Ángel Hernández	Mexico	–	–	xxx							NM	
	Jonathan Batista	Dominican Republic	–	–	xxx							NM	

=== Long jump ===
4 August

Rank	Name	Nationality	#1	#2	#3	#4	#5	#6	Result	Notes
1st place, gold medalist(s)	Jorge Hodelín	Cuba	x	7.76	8.23	8.21	x	x	8.23	
2nd place, silver medalist(s)	Eubrig Maza	Venezuela	7.85	7.59	7.60	7.75	7.60	x	7.85	
3rd place, bronze medalist(s)	Arnovis Dalmero	Colombia	7.43	7.33	7.68	7.52	7.61	7.82	7.82	
4	Nikaoli Williams	Jamaica	x	7.24	7.62	7.76	x	7.45	7.76	
5	Khybah Dawson	British Virgin Islands	7.21	7.42	7.01	x	7.61	7.34	7.61	
6	Jalen Cadet	Bahamas	7.08	7.51	x	x	7.29	7.41	7.51	
7	Yonar Duval	Dominican Republic	7.32	x	7.04	7.34	x	x	7.34	
8	Roberto Vilches	Mexico	6.84	x	7.19	7.07	x	x	7.19	
9	Jeriah Lewis	Dominica	x	6.76	6.50				6.76	

=== Triple jump ===
7 August

Rank	Name	Nationality	#1	#2	#3	#4	#5	#6	Result	Notes
1st place, gold medalist(s)	Lázaro Martínez	Cuba	x	x	16.51	16.61	16.76	x	16.76	
2nd place, silver medalist(s)	Andy Hechavarría	Cuba	16.43	16.65	16.69	16.48	x	15.96	16.69	
3rd place, bronze medalist(s)	Braizon Zorrilla	Dominican Republic	15.70	15.91	x	15.62	16.28	16.17	16.28	
4	Apalos Edwards	Jamaica	15.81	15.58	16.16	16.00	16.12	15.64	16.16	
5	Lloyd McCurdy	Guyana	15.95	15.35	x	15.72	x	16.02	16.02	
6	Jemuel Miller	Barbados	13.06	x	15.96	x	x	15.38	15.96	
7	Leodan Torrealba	Venezuela	15.87	15.86	15.73	x	15.71	15.95	15.95	
8	Jason Castro	Honduras	15.49	13.35	15.42	x	x	15.43	15.49	
9	Fernando Reyes	El Salvador	14.78	x	x				14.78	

=== Shot put ===
3 August

Rank	Name	Nationality	#1	#2	#3	#4	#5	#6	Result	Notes
1st place, gold medalist(s)	Uziel Muñoz	Mexico	20.23	x	20.05	20.51	20.30	x	20.51	
2nd place, silver medalist(s)	Juan Carley Vázquez	Cuba	x	18.81	19.34	18.43	18.85	x	19.34	
3rd place, bronze medalist(s)	Jairo Morán	Mexico	18.42	19.04	18.60	18.49	18.88	18.94	19.04	
4	Hezekiel Romeo	Trinidad and Tobago	17.45	17.29	17.51	17.73	18.01	17.83	18.01	
5	Djimon Gumbs	British Virgin Islands	x	17.44	x	17.51	x	17.78	17.78	
6	Zack Short	Honduras	16.89	16.94	16.56	17.33	17.70	17.39	17.70	
7	Christopher Crawford	Trinidad and Tobago	17.36	17.41	17.62	x	x	x	17.62	
8	Alan Cabanellas	Puerto Rico	15.97	16.52	17.00	17.41	x	17.34	17.41	
9	Frankie González	Dominican Republic	15.73	16.94	16.66				16.94	

=== Discus throw ===
5 August

Rank	Name	Nationality	#1	#2	#3	#4	#5	#6	Result	Notes
1st place, gold medalist(s)	Chad Wright	Jamaica	61.52	x	x	60.20	63.33	63.39	63.39	
2nd place, silver medalist(s)	Mario Díaz	Cuba	58.15	62.72	59.03	59.78	62.38	62.40	62.72	
3rd place, bronze medalist(s)	Racquil Broderick	Jamaica	61.85	62.07	57.32	59.77	59.10	61.04	62.07	
4	Marc-Alexandre Delin	Martinique	54.22	56.96	x	54.45	x	x	56.96	
5	Tarajh Hudson	Bahamas	51.26	52.59	54.74	x	52.67	54.76	54.76	
6	Ángel Álvarez	Cuba	54.13	x	x	52.56	52.40	x	54.13	
7	Julio Santos	Mexico	49.76	51.96	53.19	x	52.94	53.01	53.19	
8	Luis Ramírez	Dominican Republic	52.62	52.17	51.50	50.42	50.14	49.91	52.62	
9	Christopher Crawford	Trinidad and Tobago	52.39	x	x				52.39	
	Mauricio Ortega	Colombia							DNS	

=== Hammer throw ===
5 August

Rank	Name	Nationality	#1	#2	#3	#4	#5	#6	Result	Notes
1st place, gold medalist(s)	Ronald Mencía	Cuba	70.51	73.40	x	74.55	73.10	x	74.55	
2nd place, silver medalist(s)	Jerome Vega	Puerto Rico	73.13	72.69	73.88	72.22	73.37	73.78	73.88	
3rd place, bronze medalist(s)	Diego del Real	Mexico	x	68.70	72.50	71.79	73.00	72.23	73.00	
4	Miguel Zamora	Cuba	66.60	68.79	68.69	67.85	x	x	68.79	
5	Michael Soler	Puerto Rico	x	64.16	x	x	65.89	66.36	66.36	
6	Carlos Arteaga	Nicaragua	56.21	61.34	59.98	59.97	x	61.26	61.34	
7	Dylan Suárez	Costa Rica	57.79	x	58.00	58.58	58.94	60.21	60.21	
	José Eduardo Chávez	Mexico	x	x	x	r			NM	

=== Javelin throw ===
6 August

Rank	Name	Nationality	#1	#2	#3	#4	#5	#6	Result	Notes
1st place, gold medalist(s)	Anderson Peters	Grenada	82.93	80.79	83.62	81.94	83.95	80.61	83.95	
2nd place, silver medalist(s)	Iván Sibaja	Costa Rica	82.15	75.22	70.64	–	75.21	79.73	82.15	NR
3rd place, bronze medalist(s)	Billy Julio	Colombia	74.04	75.37	75.30	79.78	77.32	81.02	81.02	
4	Keshorn Walcott	Trinidad and Tobago	77.51	80.92	79.25	80.02	80.89	78.47	80.92	
5	Carlos Armenta	Mexico	70.40	74.92	77.56	76.19	74.47	78.89	78.89	
6	LeBron James	Trinidad and Tobago	72.35	x	x	72.93	75.61	x	75.61	
7	Edel Borundarena	Cuba	x	72.42	71.44	x	71.54	73.90	73.90	
8	David Ocampo	Mexico	68.35	72.25	70.81	67.40	x	69.63	72.25	
9	Enrique Agesta	Dominican Republic	52.09	65.68	56.99				65.68	
	Leikel Cabrera	Cuba							DNS	

=== Decathlon ===
3–4 August

The highest mark recorded in each event is highlighted in yellow

Rank	Athlete	Nationality	100m	LJ	SP	HJ	400m	110m H	DT	PV	JT	1500m	Points	Notes
1st place, gold medalist(s)	Yariel Soto	Puerto Rico	10.7h	7.52	13.37	1.93	48.00	15.18	42.01	4.60	55.96	4:32.27	7884	
2nd place, silver medalist(s)	Gerson Izaguirre	Venezuela	10.9h	7.03	13.91	1.93	50.17	14.21	40.39	4.70	52.07	4:58.45	7548	
3rd place, bronze medalist(s)	Carlos Córdoba	Venezuela	11.0h	7.00	12.47	1.90	50.67	16.88	44.66	4.40	64.29	4:38.05	7379	
4	Abimelec Zamorano	Mexico	11.2h	6.63	11.58	1.93	49.64	14.97	36.82	4.30	63.68	4:50.52	7208	
5	Josmi Sánchez	Cuba	11.2h	7.27	13.16	2.02	50.17	23.64	39.55	5.20	55.33	4:39.83	7208	
6	Ismael de los Santos	Dominican Republic	11.1h	6.85	11.91	1.84	DQ	14.65	38.87	4.10	66.32	4:33.58	6559	
	Darío Rodríguez	Mexico	10.7h	6.54	12.46	1.81	DQ	15.16	36.67	4.20	43.26	DNS	DNF	
	Lindon Victor	Grenada	DNS	–	–	–	–	–	–	–	–	–	DNS	

== Women's results ==
=== 100 metres ===
Heats – 3 August
Wind:
Heat 1: -1.4 m/s, Heat 2: -1.9 m/s, Heat 3: -1.1 m/s

Rank	Heat	Name	Nationality	Time	Notes
1	1	Liranyi Alonso	Dominican Republic	11.26	Q
2	3	Gladymar Torres	Puerto Rico	11.38	Q
3	1	Frances Colón	Puerto Rico	11.46 (.456)	Q
4	2	Geolyna Dowdye	Antigua and Barbuda	11.46 (.457)	Q
5	2	Fiordaliza Cofil	Dominican Republic	11.47	Q
6	3	Yarima García	Cuba	11.49 (.490)	Q
7	3	Krystal Sloley	Jamaica	11.49 (.490)	q
8	3	Orangy Jiménez	Venezuela	11.61	q
9	3	Cecilia Tamayo	Mexico	11.64	
10	1	Glanyernis Guerra	Venezuela	11.68	
11	2	Natasha Morrison	Jamaica	11.70	
12	1	Miriam Sánchez	Mexico	11.75	
13	2	María Maturana	Colombia	11.76	
14	1	Camille Rutherford	Bahamas	11.82	
15	2	Mariandrée Chacón	Guatemala	11.84	
16	2	Yunisleidy García	Cuba	11.95	
17	3	Juvonna Cornette	Guyana	12.01	
18	1	Rori Lowe	Honduras	12.04	
19	1	Tonya Rowlins	Guyana	12.55	

Final – 3 August

Wind: -0.7 m/s

Rank	Lane	Name	Nationality	Time	Notes
1st place, gold medalist(s)	5	Liranyi Alonso	Dominican Republic	11.10	
2nd place, silver medalist(s)	4	Gladymar Torres	Puerto Rico	11.22	
3rd place, bronze medalist(s)	2	Yarima García	Cuba	11.32	
4	3	Geolyna Dowdye	Antigua and Barbuda	11.33	
5	1	Orangy Jiménez	Venezuela	11.35	
6	7	Fiordaliza Cofil	Dominican Republic	11.36	
7	8	Krystal Sloley	Jamaica	11.38 (.371)	
8	6	Frances Colón	Puerto Rico	11.38 (.380)	

=== 200 metres ===
Heats – 5 August
Wind:
Heat 1: +1.6 m/s, Heat 2: +1.2 m/s, Heat 3: +1.5 m/s

Rank	Heat	Name	Nationality	Time	Notes
1	2	Estrella de Aza	Dominican Republic	22.69	Q
2	1	Liranyi Alonso	Dominican Republic	22.70	Q
3	3	Niesha Burgher	Jamaica	22.76	Q
4	3	Beyoncé Defreitas	British Virgin Islands	22.82	Q
5	3	Yarima García	Cuba	22.91	q
6	1	Orangy Jiménez	Venezuela	22.92	Q
7	2	Kelia Bentham	Barbados	23.20	Q
8	3	Cecilia Tamayo	Mexico	23.21	q
9	2	Miriam Sánchez	Mexico	23.35	
10	3	Taejha Badal	Trinidad and Tobago	23.40	
11	3	Mariandrée Chacón	Guatemala	23.54	
12	1	Saraiah Walkes	United States Virgin Islands	23.61 (.604)	
13	2	María Alejandra Carmona	Nicaragua	23.61 (.609)	NR
14	1	Geolyna Dowdye	Antigua and Barbuda	23.79	
15	1	Rori Lowe	Honduras	24.41	
	1	Krystal Sloley	Jamaica	DNF	
	2	Marlet Ospino	Colombia	DQ	TR17.2.3[B]
	2	Yunisleidy García	Cuba	DQ	FS

Final – 6 August

Wind: -3.4 m/s

Rank	Lane	Name	Nationality	Time	Notes
1st place, gold medalist(s)	7	Liranyi Alonso	Dominican Republic	23.07	
2nd place, silver medalist(s)	3	Beyoncé Defreitas	British Virgin Islands	23.36	
3rd place, bronze medalist(s)	8	Orangy Jiménez	Venezuela	23.43	
4	6	Niesha Burgher	Jamaica	23.48	
5	1	Yarima García	Cuba	23.49	
6	5	Estrella de Aza	Dominican Republic	23.73	
7	4	Kelia Bentham	Barbados	23.82	
8	2	Cecilia Tamayo	Mexico	24.09	

=== 400 metres ===
Heats – 4 August

Rank	Heat	Name	Nationality	Time	Notes
1	2	Roxana Gómez	Cuba	50.15	Q
2	1	Marileidy Paulino	Dominican Republic	50.63	Q
3	1	Shafiqua Maloney	Saint Vincent and the Grenadines	51.22	Q
4	1	Andrea Rivera	Puerto Rico	51.78	Q
5	2	Gabby Scott	Puerto Rico	52.25	Q
6	1	Lina Licona	Colombia	52.35	q
7	2	Anabel Medina	Dominican Republic	52.49	Q
8	1	Taejha Badal	Trinidad and Tobago	52.80	q
9	2	Asia Foster	Barbados	53.32	
10	1	Valeria Pineda	Mexico	53.33	
11	2	Joanne Reid	Jamaica	53.92	
12	2	Emilie Montout	Guadeloupe	54.38	
13	2	Claudia Alvarado	Mexico	54.53	
14	1	Camila Rodríguez	Cuba	56.71	

Final – 5 August

Rank	Lane	Name	Nationality	Time	Notes
1st place, gold medalist(s)	4	Marileidy Paulino	Dominican Republic	48.94	GR
2nd place, silver medalist(s)	5	Roxana Gómez	Cuba	49.99	
3rd place, bronze medalist(s)	7	Shafiqua Maloney	Saint Vincent and the Grenadines	51.77	
4	8	Andrea Rivera	Puerto Rico	52.01	
5	6	Gabby Scott	Puerto Rico	52.42	
6	1	Taejha Badal	Trinidad and Tobago	52.69	
7	2	Lina Licona	Colombia	52.82	
8	3	Anabel Medina	Dominican Republic	53.07	

=== 800 metres ===
7 August

Rank	Name	Nationality	Time	Notes
1st place, gold medalist(s)	Daily Cooper	Cuba	1:59.00	
2nd place, silver medalist(s)	Lorena Rangel	Mexico	2:04.29	
3rd place, bronze medalist(s)	Verónica Talamantes	Mexico	2:06.28	
4	Angeline Pondler	Costa Rica	2:06.84	
5	Lilian Reyes	Dominican Republic	2:09.12	
6	Mikeiry Moreno	Dominican Republic	2:09.14	
7	Antonella Lanuza	Costa Rica	2:17.61	
	Shafiqua Maloney	Saint Vincent and the Grenadines	DNS	

=== 1500 metres ===
5 August

Rank	Name	Nationality	Time	Notes
1st place, gold medalist(s)	Daily Cooper	Cuba	4:07.46	
2nd place, silver medalist(s)	Anisleidis Ochoa	Cuba	4:08.87	
3rd place, bronze medalist(s)	Lorena Rangel	Mexico	4:12.06	
4	Dafne Juárez	Mexico	4:18.74	
5	Natalie Bitetti	El Salvador	4:26.97	
6	Débora Quel	Guatemala	4:28.87	
7	Rudelina Pérez	Dominican Republic	4:49.85	
8	Antonella Lanuza	Costa Rica	4:57.37	

=== 5000 metres ===
3 August

Rank	Name	Nationality	Time	Notes
1st place, gold medalist(s)	Anisleidis Ochoa	Cuba	16:57.67	
2nd place, silver medalist(s)	Edymar Brea	Venezuela	16:59.67	
3rd place, bronze medalist(s)	Dafne Juárez	Mexico	17:00.45	
4	Sabrina Salcedo	Mexico	17:04.41	
5	Joselyn Brea	Venezuela	17:07.15	
6	Sandra Raxón	Guatemala	17:12.36	
7	Marian López	Cuba	17:20.11	
8	Natalie Bitetti	El Salvador	17:22.37	
9	Viageisy Jiménez	Dominican Republic	18:56.85	

=== 10,000 metres ===
6 August

Rank	Name	Nationality	Time	Notes
1st place, gold medalist(s)	Laura Galván	Mexico	34:26.06	
2nd place, silver medalist(s)	Viviana Aroche	Guatemala	34:26.12	
3rd place, bronze medalist(s)	Edymar Brea	Venezuela	34:27.06	
4	Heidy Villegas	Guatemala	34:27.39	
5	Meury Bacallao	Cuba	35:06.20	
6	Mariel Salazar	Mexico	35:13.16	
7	Soranyi Rodríguez	Dominican Republic	35:29.76	
8	Idelma Delgado	El Salvador	38:03.29	
	Joselyn Brea	Venezuela	DNF	

=== Half marathon ===
2 August

Rank	Name	Nationality	Time	Notes
1st place, gold medalist(s)	Laura Galván	Mexico	1:13:43	
2nd place, silver medalist(s)	Adela Honorato	Mexico	1:14:05	
3rd place, bronze medalist(s)	Viviana Aroche	Guatemala	1:14:30	
4	Heidy Villegas	Guatemala	1:16:49	
5	Soranyi Rodríguez	Dominican Republic	1:18:06	
6	Meury Bacallao	Cuba	1:18:52	
7	Diana Bogantes	Costa Rica	1:22:54	
8	Paola Figueroa	Puerto Rico	1:23:02	
	Beverly Ramos	Puerto Rico	DNF	

=== 100 metres hurdles ===
Heats – 4 August
Wind:
Heat 1: -0.4 m/s, Heat 2: -1.2 m/s

Rank	Heat	Name	Nationality	Time	Notes
1	1	María Fernanda Murillo	Colombia	12.83	Q
2	2	Greisys Roble	Cuba	12.94	Q
3	1	Paola Vázquez	Puerto Rico	13.24	Q
4	2	Denisha Cartwright	Bahamas	13.26	Q
5	1	Lisyanet Ruiz	Cuba	13.27	Q
6	2	Deya Erickson	British Virgin Islands	13.61	Q
7	2	Adeyah Brewster	Barbados	13.64	q
8	1	Maya Rollins	Barbados	13.73	q
9	2	Tamara Abad	Dominican Republic	13.90	
10	1	Andrea Vargas	Costa Rica	13.93 (.926)	
11	1	Dalhiana Rouvillon	Guadeloupe	13.93 (.930)	
12	2	Nathalie Almendárez	El Salvador	14.56	

Final – 5 August

Wind: -0.4 m/s

Rank	Lane	Name	Nationality	Time	Notes
1st place, gold medalist(s)	5	María Fernanda Murillo	Colombia	12.64	NR
2nd place, silver medalist(s)	4	Greisys Roble	Cuba	12.68	
3rd place, bronze medalist(s)	3	Paola Vázquez	Puerto Rico	12.99 (.981)	
4	6	Denisha Cartwright	Bahamas	12.99	
5	8	Adeyah Brewster	Barbados	13.24	
6	2	Deya Erickson	British Virgin Islands	13.31	
7	1	Maya Rollins	Barbados	13.69	
	7	Lisyanet Ruiz	Cuba	DNF	

=== 400 metres hurdles ===
Heats – 3 August

Rank	Heat	Name	Nationality	Time	Notes
1	1	Gianna Woodruff	Panama	54.76	Q
2	1	Daniela Rojas	Costa Rica	55.15	Q, NR
3	2	Grace Claxton	Puerto Rico	55.79	Q
4	1	María Alejandra Rocha	Colombia	56.01	Q PB
5	2	Yara Amador	Mexico	56.30	Q
6	1	Evelyn del Carmen	Dominican Republic	57.45	q
7	2	Franshina Martínez	Dominican Republic	58.81	Q
8	1	Yanique Haye-Smith	Turks and Caicos Islands	1:00.61	q
9	2	Charissa December	Guyana	1:06.06	

Final – 4 August

Rank	Lane	Name	Nationality	Time	Notes
1st place, gold medalist(s)	6	Gianna Woodruff	Panama	53.98	GR
2nd place, silver medalist(s)	4	Grace Claxton	Puerto Rico	55.40	
3rd place, bronze medalist(s)	7	Daniela Rojas	Costa Rica	56.10	
4	3	María Alejandra Rocha	Colombia	56.37	
5	8	Franshina Martínez	Dominican Republic	57.37	
6	1	Evelyn del Carmen	Dominican Republic	57.61	
7	2	Yanique Haye-Smith	Turks and Caicos Islands	1:01.22	
8	5	Yara Amador	Mexico	DQ	TR22.6

=== 3000 metres steeplechase ===
7 August

Rank	Name	Nationality	Time	Notes
1st place, gold medalist(s)	Anisleidis Ochoa	Cuba	9:50.88	NR
2nd place, silver medalist(s)	Sabrina Salcedo	Mexico	10:06.08	
3rd place, bronze medalist(s)	Arian Chia	Mexico	10:06.68	
4	Alondra Negrón	Puerto Rico	10:17.42	
5	Osmairys González	Cuba	10:28.22	
6	María Nellys Chaves	Costa Rica	10:42.88	NR
7	Débora Quel	Guatemala	10:51.10	NR
8	Anayelis Ramírez	Dominican Republic	11:22.51	

=== 4 × 100 metres relay ===
6 August

Rank	Lane	Nation	Competitors	Time	Notes
1st place, gold medalist(s)	6	Dominican Republic	Patricia Sine, Fiordaliza Cofil, Liranyi Alonso, Estrella de Aza	43.00	GR, NR
2nd place, silver medalist(s)	4	Puerto Rico	Adanelys Rodríguez, Gladymar Torres, Legna Echevarría, Frances Colón	43.41	NR
3rd place, bronze medalist(s)	3	Cuba	Greisys Roble, Yunisleidy García, Jocelyn Echazabal, Yarima García	43.41	
4	5	Jamaica	Natasha Morrison, Krystal Sloley, Jura Levy, Niesha Burgher	43.42	
5	8	Colombia	Marlet Ospino, Angélica Gamboa, Danna Banquez, María Maturana	43.92	
	2	El Salvador	Nancy Sandoval, Nathalie Almendárez, Natalie Barrientos, Andrea Machuca	DNF	
	7	Mexico	Alejandra Ortiz, Miriam Sánchez, Paola Ascensio, Cecilia Tamayo	DNF	

=== 4 × 400 metres relay ===
7 August

Rank	Lane	Nation	Competitors	Time	Notes
1st place, gold medalist(s)	5	Dominican Republic	Bianca Acosta, Anabel Medina, Milagros Durán, Estrella de Aza	3:28.48	
2nd place, silver medalist(s)	7	Colombia	Melany Bolaño, María Fernanda Murillo, María Alejandra Rocha, Lina Licona	3:29.01	NR
3rd place, bronze medalist(s)	6	Puerto Rico	Andrea Rivera, Sarai Javier, Grace Claxton, Gabby Scott	3:29.30	NR
4	3	Cuba	Melisa Padrón, Jocelyn Echazabal, Camila Rodríguez, Daily Cooper	3:32.61	
5	4	Jamaica	Joanne Reid, Janielle Josephs, Tonyan Beckford, Oneika Brissett	3:35.59	
6	8	Mexico	Claudia Alvarado, Yara Amador, Paola Ascensio, Valeria Pineda	3:36.67	

=== Half marathon walk ===
2 August

Rank	Name	Nationality	Time	Notes	Penalties
1st place, gold medalist(s)	Alegna González	Mexico	1:36:05	GR	
2nd place, silver medalist(s)	Alejandra Ortega	Mexico	1:39:26		>
3rd place, bronze medalist(s)	Rachelle de Orbeta	Puerto Rico	1:39:55		
4	Laura Chalarca	Colombia	1:43:34		
5	Sharon Herrera	Costa Rica	1:49:05		~>
6	Maritza Poncio	Guatemala	1:50:33		
	Milangela Rosales	Venezuela	DNF		
	Yaquelin Teletor	Guatemala	DQ		>>>>

> Card for knee flexion
~ Card due to loss of contact

=== Marathon walk ===
8 August

Rank	Name	Nationality	Time	Notes	Penalties
1st place, gold medalist(s)	Sofía Ramos	Mexico	3:52:18	GR	>>
2nd place, silver medalist(s)	María Fernanda Peinado	Guatemala	3:52:20		
3rd place, bronze medalist(s)	Naomi García	Puerto Rico	4:07:31		~~~
4	Milangela Rosales	Venezuela	4:11:52		>>
5	Jacquelin Lora	Dominican Republic	4:48:04		>
	Renata Cortes	Mexico	DNF		>

> Card for knee flexion
~ Card due to loss of contact

=== High jump ===
7 August

Rank	Name	Nationality	1.60	1.65	1.70	1.75	1.78	1.81	1.84	1.87	1.89	1.91	1.93	1.95	Result	Notes
1st place, gold medalist(s)	Marysabel Senyu	Dominican Republic	–	–	–	–	o	o	o	o	o	xo	o	xxx	1.93	
2nd place, silver medalist(s)	Dacsy Brisón	Cuba	–	–	–	–	o	xo	o	xo	o	o	xx–	x	1.91	
3rd place, bronze medalist(s)	Sakari Famous	Bermuda	–	–	–	–	o	o	o	o	o	xxx			1.89	NR
4	Glenka Antonia	Curaçao	–	–	–	o	o	o	o	xxx					1.84	
5	María Arboleda	Colombia	–	–	–	o	o	o	xo	xxx					1.84	
6	Claudina Díaz	Mexico	–	–	xxo	o	o	xxx							1.78	
7	Jelese Alexander	Trinidad and Tobago	–	o	o	o	xo	xxx							1.78	
8	Abigail Obando	Costa Rica	o	xo	xo	xxx									1.70	
9	Jah'kyla Morton	British Virgin Islands	xo	xo	xxo	xxx									1.70	
	Ana Isabella González	El Salvador													DNS	

=== Pole vault ===
7 August

Rank	Name	Nationality	3.15	3.30	3.40	3.50	3.60	3.70	3.80	3.90	4.00	4.10	4.20	Result	Notes
1st place, gold medalist(s)	Aslin Quiala	Cuba	–	–	–	–	–	–	–	xo	xo	o	o	4.20	
2nd place, silver medalist(s)	Karelia James	Cuba	–	–	–	–	–	o	xo	xo	xxo	o	xxx	4.10	
3rd place, bronze medalist(s)	Andrea Velasco	Mexico	–	–	–	–	–	–	xxo	o	xxx			3.90	
4	Andrea Velasco	El Salvador	–	–	–	–	o	xxx						3.60	
5	Mariely Mota	Dominican Republic	–	–	xo	xxx								3.40	
6	Alessandra Obrist	Guatemala	xxo	o	xxx									3.30	
	Alisandra Negrete	Mexico	–	–	–	–	–	–	–	xxx				NM	
	Andrea Machuca	El Salvador	xxx											NM	

=== Long jump ===
5 August

Rank	Name	Nationality	#1	#2	#3	#4	#5	#6	Result	Notes
1st place, gold medalist(s)	Alysbeth Félix	Puerto Rico	6.28	x	6.54	–	–	–	6.54	
2nd place, silver medalist(s)	Evelina Minaya	Dominican Republic	6.49	x	x	x	6.43	6.35	6.49	
3rd place, bronze medalist(s)	Nathalee Aranda	Panama	x	6.46	x	6.47	4.80	x	6.47	
4	Rosmaiby Quesada	Cuba	6.13	x	x	x	6.16	6.38	6.38	
5	Paola Fernández	Puerto Rico	6.31	6.22	6.34	6.12	6.13	6.34	6.34	
6	Akela Inatta-Jones	Barbados	x	5.51	x	5.98	x	6.01	6.01	
7	Mariah Toussaint	Dominica	5.89	x	x	x	–	–	5.89	
8	Ornelis Ortiz	Venezuela	5.61	5.79	5.80w	5.80	–	–	5.80	
9	Natalie Barrientos	El Salvador	5.29	x	5.45				5.45	
	Kimberly Smith	Jamaica							DNS	

=== Triple jump ===
3 August

Rank	Name	Nationality	#1	#2	#3	#4	#5	#6	Result	Notes
1st place, gold medalist(s)	Leyanis Pérez	Cuba	14.78	14.64	14.65w	x	x	–	14.78	
2nd place, silver medalist(s)	Liadagmis Povea	Cuba	13.79w	14.37	14.46	14.29w	14.34	14.71	14.71	
3rd place, bronze medalist(s)	Ana José Tima	Dominican Republic	13.76w	x	13.40	13.77	13.85	13.75	13.85	
4	Ornelis Ortiz	Venezuela	12.42	13.09	12.83	13.07	13.17	13.24	13.24	
5	Keneisha Shelbourne	Trinidad and Tobago	12.71	x	13.16	12.95	13.02	13.03	13.16	
6	Paola del Real	Mexico	12.47	12.82	x	12.73	x	12.85	12.85	
7	Thelma Fuentes	Guatemala	x	12.07	12.62	12.67	12.33	12.70	12.70	
8	Danisha Chimilio	Guatemala	x	12.23	12.62	x	x	12.62	12.62	

=== Shot put ===
6 August

Rank	Name	Nationality	#1	#2	#3	#4	#5	#6	Result	Notes
1st place, gold medalist(s)	Rosa Ramírez	Dominican Republic	17.63	18.12	18.60	17.94	18.55	18.30	18.60	
2nd place, silver medalist(s)	Dianelis Delís	Cuba	17.35	17.71	17.91	18.14	18.57	x	18.57	
3rd place, bronze medalist(s)	Kelsie Murrel-Ross	Grenada	16.10	16.92	16.51	x	x	16.68	16.92	
4	Melanie Duron	Mexico	16.51	16.59	x	16.52	16.61	x	16.61	
5	Ahymara Espinoza	Venezuela	15.72	15.72	16.17	16.23	15.96	16.31	16.31	
6	Christine Gavarin	Martinique	14.60	14.43	x	15.03	x	14.36	15.03	
7	Deisheline Mayers	Costa Rica	x	12.43	x	13.30	x	12.18	13.30	

=== Discus throw ===
7 August

Rank	Name	Nationality	#1	#2	#3	#4	#5	#6	Result	Notes
1st place, gold medalist(s)	Silinda Morales	Cuba	56.73	58.87	62.58	62.00	59.71	x	62.58	
2nd place, silver medalist(s)	Serena Brown	Bahamas	57.42	x	x	58.01	x	59.32	59.32	
3rd place, bronze medalist(s)	Melany Matheus	Cuba	53.81	x	52.96	55.26	54.93	55.29	55.29	
4	Princesse Hyman	Guadeloupe	55.12	53.97	x	x	x	x	55.12	
5	Lalenii Grant	Trinidad and Tobago	48.04	x	x	51.49	51.52	x	51.52	
6	Laura Magua	Dominican Republic	41.82	x	40.88	46.29	43.38	x	46.29	
	Samantha Morillo	Dominican Republic							DNS	

=== Hammer throw ===
7 August

Rank	Name	Nationality	#1	#2	#3	#4	#5	#6	Result	Notes
1st place, gold medalist(s)	Mayra Gaviria	Colombia	63.31	66.30	67.59	64.97	63.33	x	67.59	
2nd place, silver medalist(s)	Rosa Rodríguez	Venezuela	x	63.15	65.86	65.08	x	66.17	66.17	
3rd place, bronze medalist(s)	Yaritza Martínez	Cuba	64.79	65.90	64.19	x	64.27	x	65.90	
4	Elvia Canela	Mexico	x	63.56	x	x	61.19	x	63.56	
5	Paola Bueno	Mexico	61.81	x	62.94	61.80	62.50	61.15	62.94	
6	Yarielis Torres	Puerto Rico	60.38	60.63	x	x	x	60.44	60.63	
7	Yenniver Veroes	Venezuela	57.47	60.55	x	58.34	x	x	60.55	
8	María José Soto	El Salvador	45.49	x	x	x	44.34	46.00	46.00	
	Ludith Campos	Dominican Republic							DNS	

=== Javelin throw ===
4 August

Rank	Name	Nationality	#1	#2	#3	#4	#5	#6	Result	Notes
1st place, gold medalist(s)	Flor Ruiz	Colombia	67.34	63.50	x	–	–	–	67.34	GR, AR
2nd place, silver medalist(s)	Valentina Barrios	Colombia	56.00	58.14	x	x	55.38	46.95	58.14	
3rd place, bronze medalist(s)	Yessi Tejada	Dominican Republic	52.02	53.43	54.95	46.57	49.94	46.16	54.95	NR
4	Luz Castro	Mexico	52.09	50.41	51.11	48.83	53.51	54.12	54.12	
5	Marianaily Silva	Cuba	50.86	50.17	x	x	52.32	x	52.32	
6	Ivita Schizas	Puerto Rico	43.38	46.48	47.20	45.15	46.72	49.50	49.50	
7	Suerena Alexander	Grenada	42.57	44.82	49.28	46.20	45.28	48.83	49.28	
8	Esperanza Sibaja	Nicaragua	47.16	x	x	45.81	45.68	x	47.16	
9	Anisha Gibbons	Guyana	x	x	44.50				44.50	

=== Heptathlon ===
5–6 August

The highest mark recorded in each event is highlighted in yellow

Rank	Athlete	Nationality	100m H	HJ	SP	200m	LJ	JT	800m	Points	Notes
1st place, gold medalist(s)	Alysbeth Félix	Puerto Rico	13.47	1.70	11.79	24.30	6.62	41.87	2:16.03	6136	NR
2nd place, silver medalist(s)	Yessi Tejada	Dominican Republic	13.17	1.61	12.71	24.67	6.03w	51.90	2:34.99	5859	
3rd place, bronze medalist(s)	Fabiola Declet	Puerto Rico	13.69	1.58	12.07	24.34	5.88	42.70	2:20.76	5694	
4	Marienger Chirinos	Venezuela	14.42	1.67	12.03	25.02	5.86w	36.07	2:18.34	5531	
5	Lilian Borja	Mexico	14.26	1.61	11.97	25.80	5.37w	40.05	2:17.30	5355	
6	Katia Uribe	Mexico	14.74	1.70	10.22	27.01	5.64	42.18	2:32.88	5093	
	Ana Isabella González	El Salvador	14.27	1.64	8.43	26.16	5.09	DNS	–	DNF	
	Martha Araújo	Colombia	DNF	–	–	–	–	–	–	DNF	

== Mixed results ==
=== 4 × 100 metres relay ===
4 August

Rank	Lane	Nation	Competitors	Time	Notes
1st place, gold medalist(s)	6	Dominican Republic	Mayobanex de Óleo, Fiordaliza Cofil, José González, Liranyi Alonso	40.89	GR, NR
2nd place, silver medalist(s)	4	Jamaica	Travis Williams, Niesha Burgher, Adrian Kerr, Jura Levy	41.06	
3rd place, bronze medalist(s)	7	Cuba	Georvis Domínguez, Yunisleidy García, Reynaldo Espinosa, Yarima García	41.18	
4	1	Puerto Rico	Eloy Benitez, Gladymar Torres, Adrián Canales, Frances Colón	41.39	
5	6	Colombia	Carlos Flórez, Marlet Ospino, Neiker Abello, Angélica Gamboa	41.55	NR
6	8	Venezuela	Bryant Álamo, Orangy Jiménez, Alexis Nieves, Glanyernis Guerra	41.79	NR
7	2	Barbados	Justin Maynard, Kishawna Niles, Amari Knight, Kelia Bentham	42.21	
	3	Mexico	Austin Kresley, Miriam Sanchez, Gerardo Lomeli, Cecilia Tamayo	DQ	TR24.7

=== 4 × 400 metres relay ===
3 August

Rank	Lane	Nation	Competitors	Time	Notes
1st place, gold medalist(s)	6	Dominican Republic	Érick Sánchez, Anabel Medina, Christopher Melenciano, Marileidy Paulino	3:10.57	GR
2nd place, silver medalist(s)	4	Puerto Rico	José Figueroa, Andrea Rivera, Jarell Cruz, Gabby Scott	3:11.88	NR
3rd place, bronze medalist(s)	3	Cuba	Yohandris Bientz, Camila Rodríguez, Yoandys Lescay, Roxana Gómez	3:13.32	NR
4	7	Colombia	Jhonatan Hoyos, Melany Bolaño, Óscar Baltán, Lina Licona	3:16.60	
5	8	Mexico	Pablo Vargas, Valeria Pineda, Luis Avilés, Claudia Alvarado	3:16.71	
6	5	Jamaica	Demar Francis, Janielle Josephs, Kirk Dawkins, Tonyan Beckford	3:23.66	
