= Athletics at the 2026 Central American and Caribbean Games =

- Venue: Estadio Olímpico Félix Sánchez; George Washington Avenue
- Location: Santo Domingo, Dominican Republic
- Start date: 2 August 2026
- End date: 8 August 2026
- Competitors: 439 from 30 nations

The athletics competition at the 2026 Central American and Caribbean Games was held in Santo Domingo, Dominican Republic, from 2 to 8 August 2026 at the Estadio Olímpico Félix Sánchez for the track and field events and George Washington Avenue for the road events.

== Participating nations ==
A total of 32 nations qualified athletes. The number of athletes a nation entered is in parentheses beside the name of the country.

- Antigua and Barbuda (2)
- Bahamas (13)
- Barbados (19)
- Bermuda (3)
- British Virgin Islands (7)
- Colombia (27)
- Costa Rica (13)
- Cuba (47)
- Curaçao (1)
- Dominica (2)
- Dominican Republic (57)
- El Salvador (17)
- Guadeloupe (6)
- Grenada (5)
- Guatemala (17)
- Guyana (5)
- Honduras (3)
- Jamaica (25)
- Martinique (4)
- Mexico (63)
- Nicaragua (4)
- Panama (5)
- Puerto Rico (42)
- Saint Lucia (1)
- Saint Vincent and the Grenadines (2)
- Suriname (1)
- Trinidad and Tobago (13)
- Turks and Caicos Islands (3)
- Virgin Islands (2)
- Venezuela (30)

== Medal table ==
* Host nation (Dominican Republic)

Rank	Nation	Gold	Silver	Bronze	Total
1	Dominican Republic (DOM)*	14	5	4	23
2	Cuba (CUB)	10	11	7	28
3	Mexico (MEX)	10	7	11	28
4	Puerto Rico (PUR)	5	7	9	21
5	Colombia (COL)	4	3	4	11
6	Panama (PAN)	2	0	1	3
7	Venezuela (VEN)	1	5	5	11
8	Jamaica (JAM)	1	3	1	5
9	Grenada (GRN)	1	0	1	2
10	Guadeloupe (GLP)	1	0	0	1
11	Guatemala (GUA)	0	3	2	5
12	Bahamas (BAH)	0	1	1	2
12	Costa Rica (CRC)	0	1	1	2
12	Trinidad and Tobago (TTO)	0	1	1	2
15	British Virgin Islands (IVB)	0	1	0	1
15	El Salvador (ESA)	0	1	0	1
17	Bermuda (BER)	0	0	1	1
17	Saint Vincent and the Grenadines (VIN)	0	0	1	1
Totals (18 entries)		49	49	50	148

== Medal summary ==
=== Men's events ===
Event	Gold		Silver		Bronze	
100 m	Ronal Longa; Colombia	10.06	Bouwahjgie Nkrumie; Jamaica	10.17	Melbin Marcelino; Dominican Republic	10.19
200 m	José Figueroa; Puerto Rico	19.98	Alexander Ogando; Dominican Republic	20.47	Aaron Charles; Trinidad and Tobago	20.63
400 m	Gabriel Moronta; Dominican Republic	44.70	Luis Avilés; Mexico	45.06	Javier Gómez; Venezuela	45.07
800 m	Ferdy Agramonte; Dominican Republic	1:46.07	José Antonio Maita; Venezuela	1:46.10	Jesús Tonatiú López; Mexico	1:46.86
1500 m	Eduardo Herrera; Mexico	3:46.07	Ryan Adams; Mexico	3:47.06	Hansel Abreu; Cuba	3:47.20
5000 m	Eduardo Herrera; Mexico	13:50.86	Víctor Ortiz; Puerto Rico	14:02.74	Pedro Marín; Colombia	14:02.80
10,000 m	José Luis Santana; Mexico	29:28.69	Héctor Pagán; Puerto Rico	29:33.79	Alberto González; Guatemala	29:45.81
110 m hurdles	Ulric Portier; Guadeloupe	13.46	Rinaldo Moore; Trinidad and Tobago	13.56	John Paredes; Colombia	13.57
400 m hurdles	Yeral Núñez; Dominican Republic	48.30	Pablo Ibáñez; El Salvador	49.64	Guillermo Campos; Mexico	49.82
3000 m steeplechase	Diddier Rodríguez; Panama	8:38.81	César Gómez; Mexico	8:39.59	Víctor Ortiz; Puerto Rico	8:39.72
4 × 100 m relay	Dominican Republic; Franquelo Pérez; Yohandris Andújar; Melbin Marcelino; Yancarlos Martínez	37.98 GR, NR	Jamaica; Travis Williams; Bouwahjgie Nkrumie; Javari Thomas; Tyquendo Tracey	38.08	Puerto Rico; Eloy Benítez; José Figueroa; Adrián Canales; Pedro Rivas	38.12
4 × 400 m relay	Puerto Rico; José Figueroa; Pedro Rivas; Alejandro Rosado; Jarell Cruz	3:00.75	Dominican Republic; Gabriel Moronta; Luguelín Santos; Lidio Andrés Feliz; Yeral Núñez	3:00.94	Venezuela; Axel Gómez; Javier Gómez; José Antonio Maita; Kelvis Padrino	3:01.64
Half marathon	Álvaro Abreu; Dominican Republic	1:02:48 GR	Alberto González; Guatemala	1:04:58	Héctor Pagán; Puerto Rico	1:05:33
Half marathon race walk	Ricardo Ortíz; Mexico	1:29:41 GR	Éider Arévalo; Colombia	1:31:28	Roberto Vázquez; Mexico	1:33:56
High jump	Erick Portillo; Mexico	2.24 m	Luis Zayas; Cuba	2.20 m	Jair Portillo; Mexico	2.17 m
High jump	Erick Portillo; Mexico	2.24 m	Luis Zayas; Cuba	2.20 m	Marcus Gelpí; Puerto Rico	2.17 m
Pole vault	Ricardo Montes de Oca; Venezuela	5.30 m	Jorge Montes; Dominican Republic	5.20 m	Brenden Vanderpool; Bahamas	5.10 m
Long jump	Jorge A. Hodelín; Cuba	8.23 m	Eubrig Maza; Venezuela	7.85 m	Arnovis Dalmero; Colombia	7.82 m
Triple jump	Lázaro Martínez; Cuba	16.76 m	Andy Echavarría; Cuba	16.69 m	Braison Guillermo; Dominican Republic	16.28 m
Shot put	Uziel Muñoz; Mexico	20.51 m	Juan Carley Vázquez; Cuba	19.34 m	Jairo Morán; Mexico	19.04 m
Discus throw	Chad Wright; Jamaica	63.39 m	Mario Díaz; Cuba	62.72 m	Racquil Broderick; Jamaica	62.07 m
Hammer throw	Ronald Mencía; Cuba	74.55 m	Jerome Vega; Puerto Rico	73.88 m	Diego del Real; Mexico	73.00 m
Javelin throw	Anderson Peters; Grenada	83.95 m	Iván Sibaja; Costa Rica	82.15 m	Billy Julio; Colombia	81.02 m
Decathlon	Yariel Soto; Puerto Rico	7884 pts	Gerson Izaguirre; Venezuela	7548 pts	Carlos Córdova; Venezuela	7379 pts

=== Women's events ===
Event	Gold		Silver		Bronze	
100 m	Liranyi Alonso; Dominican Republic	11.10 GR	Gladymar Torres; Puerto Rico	11.22	Yarima García; Cuba	11.32
200 m	Liranyi Alonso; Dominican Republic	23.07	Beyoncé Defreitas; British Virgin Islands	23.36	Orangys Jiménez; Venezuela	23.43
400 m	Marileidy Paulino; Dominican Republic	48.94 GR	Roxana Gómez; Cuba	49.99	Shafiqua Maloney; Saint Vincent and the Grenadines	51.77
800 m	Daily Cooper Gaspar; Cuba	1:59.00	Lorena Rangel; Mexico	2:04.29	Verónica Ángel; Mexico	2:06.28
1500 m	Daily Cooper Gaspar; Cuba	4:07.46 GR	Anisleidis Ochoa; Cuba	4:08.87	Lorena Rangel; Mexico	4:12.06
5000 m	Anisleidis Ochoa; Cuba	16:57.67	Edymar Brea; Venezuela	16:59.67	Dafne Juárez; Mexico	17:00.45
10,000 m	Laura Galván; Mexico	34:26.06	Viviana Aroche; Guatemala	34:26.12	Edymar Brea; Venezuela	34:27.06
100 m hurdles	María Fernanda Murillo; Colombia	12.64 NR	Greisys Roble; Cuba	12.68	Paola Vázquez; Puerto Rico	12.99
400 m hurdles	Gianna Woodruff; Panama	53.98 GR	Grace Claxton; Puerto Rico	55.40	Daniela Rojas; Costa Rica	56.10
3000 m steeplechase	Anisleidis Ochoa; Cuba	9:50.88	Sabrina Salcedo; Mexico	10:06.08	Arian Chía; Mexico	10:06.68
4 × 100 m relay	Dominican Republic; Patricia Sine; Fiordaliza Cofil; Liranyi Alonso; Estrella de Aza	43.00 GR	Puerto Rico; Adanelys Rodríguez; Gladymar Torres; Legna Echevarría; Frances Colón	43.41 (.409)	Cuba; Greisys Roble; Yunisleidy García; Jocelyn Echazabal; Yarima García	43.41 (.410)
4 × 400 m relay	Dominican Republic; Bianka Acosta; Anabel Medina; Milagros Durán; Estrella de Aza	3:28.48	Colombia; Melany Bolaño; María Fernanda Murillo; María Alejandra Rocha; Lina Licona	3:29.01 NR	Puerto Rico; Andrea Rivera; Sarai Javier; Grace Claxton; Gabby Scott	3:29.30
Half marathon	Laura Galván; Mexico	1:13:43 GR	Adela Honorato; Mexico	1:14:05	Viviana Aroche; Guatemala	1:14:30
Half marathon race walk	Alegna González; Mexico	1:36:05 GR	Alejandra Ortega; Mexico	1:39:26	Rachelle De Orbeta; Puerto Rico	1:39:55
Marathon race walk	Sofía Ramos; Mexico	3:52:18 GR	María Fernanda Peinado; Guatemala	3:52:20	Naomi García; Puerto Rico	4:07:31
High jump	Marysabel Senyu; Dominican Republic	1.93 m	Dacsy Brisón; Cuba	1.91 m	Sakari Famous; Bermuda	1.89 m
Pole vault	Aslin Quiala; Cuba	4.20 m	Karelia James; Cuba	4.10 m	Andrea Velasco; Mexico	3.90 m
Long jump	Alysbeth Félix; Puerto Rico	6.54 m	Evelina Minaya; Dominican Republic	6.49 m	Nathalee Aranda; Panama	6.47 m
Triple jump	Leyanis Pérez; Cuba	14.78 m	Liadagmis Povea; Cuba	14.71 m	Ana José Tima; Dominican Republic	13.85 m
Shot put	Rosa Ramírez; Dominican Republic	18.60 m	Dianelis Delis; Cuba	18.57 m	Kelsie Murrell; Grenada	16.92 m
Discus throw	Silinda Morales; Cuba	62.58 m	Serena Brown; Bahamas	59.32 m	Melany Matheus; Cuba	55.29 m
Hammer throw	Mayra Gaviria; Colombia	67.59 m	Rosa Rodríguez; Venezuela	66.17 m	Yaritza Martínez; Cuba	65.90 m
Javelin throw	Flor Ruiz; Colombia	67.34 m GR, AR	Valentina Barrios; Colombia	58.14 m	Yesi Tejeda; Dominican Republic	54.95 m
Heptathlon	Alysbeth Félix; Puerto Rico	6136 pts	Yesi Tejeda; Dominican Republic	5859 pts	Fabiola Declet; Puerto Rico	5694 pts

=== Mixed events ===
Event	Gold		Silver		Bronze	
4 × 100 m relay	Dominican Republic; Mayovanex de Óleo; Fiordaliza Cofil; José González; Liranyi Alonso	40.89 GR	Jamaica; Travis Williams; Niesha Burgher; Adrian Kerr; Jura Levy	41.06	Cuba; Giorvis Domínguez; Yunisleidy García; Reynaldo Espinosa; Yarima García	41.18
4 × 400 m relay	Dominican Republic; Erick Sánchez; Anabel Medina; Christopher Melenciano; Marileidy Paulino	3:10.57 GR	Puerto Rico; José Figueroa; Andrea Rivera; Jarell Cruz; Gabby Scott	3:11.88 NR	Cuba; Yohendris Bientz; Camila Rodríguez; Yoandys Lescay; Roxana Gómez	3:13.32
