= Avilés (surname) =

Avilés is a Spanish surname. Notable people with the surname include:

- Alicia Avilés, educator and community leader in Costa Rica
- Caleb Avilés, former member of the boy band MDO
- Daniel Avilés (born 2001), Spanish actor
- Gabriel de Avilés, 2nd Marquis of Avilés (c. 1735–1810), governor of Chile, viceroy of Río de la Plata, and viceroy of Peru
- Joseph B. Aviles Sr. (1896–1990), Puerto Rican born officer in the United States Navy and Coast Guard
- Lila Avilés (born 1982), Mexican film director, screenwriter, actress and producer
- Lucho Avilés (1938–2019), Uruguayan-born Argentine journalist and television presenter
- Luis Avilés (born 1990), Argentine professional footballer
- Óscar Avilés (1924–2014), Peruvian musician
- Pedro Avilés (born 1956), Spanish writer
- Pedro Menéndez de Avilés (1519–1574), first governor of Spanish Florida and governor of colonial Cuba
- Ramón Avilés (1952–2020), Puerto Rican baseball player
- Raúl Avilés (born 1964), Ecuadorian footballer
- René Avilés Fabila (1940–2016), Mexican writer
- Tomás Avilés (born 2004), Argentine professional footballer
