= Avilés (disambiguation) =

Avilés is a city in Asturias, Spain.

Avilés may refer to:

- Avilés (surname)
- Avilés (Asturian comarca), one of eight comarcas of Asturias, Spain
- Avilés (parish), one of six civil parishes in Avilés, Asturias, Spain

== See also ==
- Real Avilés Industrial, a Spanish football team
- José María Avilés Province, in the western parts of Tarija department
