= Luis Avilés =

Luis Avilés may refer to:

- Luis Avilés (footballer) (born 1990), Argentinian footballer
- Luis Avilés (athlete) (born 2002), Mexican sprinter
