= Jenns Fernández =

Cuban sprinter (born 2001)

Jenns Fernandez
Personal information
- Full name: Jenns Reynold Fernández Alfonso
- Born: 4 January 2001 (age 25)

Sport
- Sport: Athletics
- Event: Sprint

Achievements and titles
- Personal bests: 60m: 6.48 (2024) NR; 100m: 10.11 (2024); 200m: 20.91 (2023)

Jenns Reynold Fernández Alfonso (born 4 January 2001) is a Cuban-born sprinter based in Italy. He is the Cuban national record holder over 60 metres.

== Biography ==
Fernández started off playing baseball before focusing on athletics. He attended a sports specialist school in Matanzas and was Cuban junior champion for two consecutive years in the 100 metres, placing second in that event at his debut Barrientos Memorial in Havana, with a Cuban under-20 national record of 10.14 seconds (+1.9 m/s). Competing at the 2019 Pan American U20 Athletics Championships in Costa Rica, he placed fourth in the 100 metres.

In 2022, Fernández left Cuba and based himself in Italy, first in Apulia, later in Siena, and then in Villa Lagarina in Trentino, where he started to be coached by Silvano Pedri. In 2023, he ran a best 60 metres time of 6.66 seconds. That summer in the 100 meters he ran 10.15 seconds in Nembro, and went faster in Agropoli with a run of 10.13 seconds. In January 2024, Fernandez ran 6.52 seconds for the 60 metres in Ancona. The following week however, he set a new Cuban national record for the 60 metres of 6.48 seconds, also in Ancona. The time placed him fifth on the worldwide end-of-year list for 2024.

Fernández was active in the 60 metres on the World Athletics Indoor Tour in 2026. He ran 6.61 seconds at the Meeting de Paris, and 6.62 seconds in Miramas, in January 206. In February 2026, Fernández ran a seasons best 6.56 seconds in Madrid, before lowering it again to 6.54 seconds at the Belgrade Indoor Meeting.
