= 2021 World Athletics U20 Championships – Men's 400 metres =

Men's 400 metres at the 2021 World Athletics U20 Championships
- Venue: Kasarani Stadium
- Dates: 18 August (heats); 21 August (final)
- Competitors: 24 from 18 nations
- Winning time: 44.58

Medalists
gold medal	Anthony Pesela	Botswana
silver medal	Luis Avilés	Mexico
bronze medal	Antonie Nortje	South Africa

The men's 400 metres at the 2021 World Athletics U20 Championships was held at the Kasarani Stadium 18 and 21 August.

== Records ==
Standing records prior to the 2021 World Athletics U20 Championships
World U20 Record	Steve Lewis (USA)	43.87	Seoul, South Korea	28 September 1988
Championship Record	Hamdan Odha Al-Bishi (KSA)	44.66	Santiago, Chile	20 October 2000
World U20 Leading	Johnnie Blockburger (USA)	44.71	Tucson, United States	10 April 2021

== Results ==
=== Heats ===
Qualification: First 2 of each heat (Q) and the 2 fastest times (q) qualified for the final.

Rank	Heat	Name	Nationality	Time	Note
1	1	Luis Avilés Ferreiro	Mexico	45.63	Q, NU20R
2	2	Anthony Pesela	Botswana	45.88	Q, PB
3	2	Antonie Matthys Nortje	South Africa	46.27	Q, PB
4	1	Lorenzo Benati	Italy	46.28	Q
5	1	Muzala Samukonga	Zambia	46.45	q
6	1	Michael Roth	Canada	46.51	q, PB
7	3	Lythe Pillay	South Africa	46.55	Q
8	2	Elkanah Kiprotich Chemelil	Kenya	46.79	PB
9	3	Kennedy Kimeu	Kenya	47.05	Q, SB
10	2	David Mulenga	Zambia	47.16	
11	3	Raman Valodzkin	Belarus	47.17	
12	3	Bamidele Ajayi	Nigeria	47.44	
13	2	Dubem Amene	Nigeria	47.50	
13	3	Revon Williams	Guyana	47.50	
15	3	Anbar Jamaan Al-Zahrani	Saudi Arabia	47.51	
16	1	Remus Andrei Niculiță	Romania	47.73	
16	3	Tahj Hamm	Jamaica	47.73	
18	2	Patryk Grzegorzewicz	Poland	47.80	
19	1	Tadeáš Plaček	Czech Republic	47.87	
20	2	Isuru Bans	Sri Lanka	48.02	
21	2	Adrian Bondoc	Romania	48.29	
22	1	Vinicius Moura	Brazil	49.59	
23	3	Mohamed Basiru Bah	Sierra Leone	49.82	PB
	1	Jeremy Bembridge	Jamaica	DNF	

=== Final ===
The final was held on 21 August at 17:19.

Rank	Lane	Name	Nationality	Time	Note
1st place, gold medalist(s)	5	Anthony Pesela	Botswana	44.58	CR
2nd place, silver medalist(s)	6	Luis Avilés	Mexico	44.95	NU20R
3rd place, bronze medalist(s)	3	Antonie Nortje	South Africa	45.32	PB
4	4	Lythe Pillay	South Africa	45.53	PB
5	1	Muzala Samukonga	Zambia	45.89	PB
6	7	Lorenzo Benati	Italy	46.06	PB
7	2	Michael Roth	Canada	46.10	PB
8	8	Kennedy Kimeu	Kenya	46.51	SB
