= 2022 Central American Championships in Athletics =

XXXII Central American Championships in Athletics
- Dates: 2–3 July
- Host city: Managua, Nicaragua
- Venue: Estadio Olímpico del IND Managua
- Level: Senior
- Events: 45
- Participation: 7 nations

The 32nd Central American Championships in Athletics were held at the Estadio Olímpico del IND in Managua, Nicaragua, between 2 and 3 July 2022.

A total of 45 events were contested, 22 by men, 22 by women, as well as one mixed event.

== Medal summary ==
=== Men ===
Event	Gold		Silver		Bronze	
100 metres (wind: +0.2 m/s)	Héctor Allen; Costa Rica	10.75	Yeykell Romero; Nicaragua	10.82	Melique García; Honduras	10.84
200 metres (wind: +1.4 m/s)	Yeykell Romero; Nicaragua	21.18	José Andrés Salazar; El Salvador	21.31	Alexander Salazar; Panama	21.45
400 metres	Chamar Chambers; Panama	47.72	Emmanuel Niño; Costa Rica	47.99	Dexter Mayorga; Nicaragua	48.02
800 metres	Chamar Chambers; Panama	1:47.85 CR	Josué Murcia; Costa Rica	1:50.21	Kelvin Ramírez; Nicaragua	1:52.59
1500 metres	Josué Murcia; Costa Rica	3:54.91	Diddier Rodríguez; Panama	3:55.17	Luis Alejandro Castro; Costa Rica	3:58.11
5000 metres	Mario Pacay; Guatemala	14:12.50 CR	Alberto Gónzalez; Guatemala	14:14.02	Daniel Johanning; Costa Rica	14:35.76
10,000 metres	Alberto Gónzalez; Guatemala	29:24.88 CR	Daniel Johanning; Costa Rica	30:12.39	Óscar Aldana; El Salvador	31:41.41
110 metres hurdles (wind: -0.7 m/s)	Wienstan Mena; Guatemala	14.17	Joaquín Allen; Panama	15.14	Julio Flores; Nicaragua	16.15
400 metres hurdles	Pablo Andrés Ibáñez; El Salvador	50.00	Emmanuel Niño; Costa Rica	50.98	Rigoberto Abrego; Panama	54.28
3000 metres steeplechase	Paulo Gómez; El Salvador	8:57.15	Diddier Rodríguez; Panama	8:57.97	Marcos Cruz; Guatemala	9:12.37
4 × 100 metres relay	El Salvador; Juan Rodríguez; Samuel Ibáñez; Ronal Moreno; José Salazar	42.57	Costa Rica; Elias Ocampo; Emmanuel Niño; Rasheed Miller; Héctor Allen	42.91	Panama; José Demera; Mateo Edward; Alberto Murrel; Rolando Francisco	42.98
4 × 400 metres relay	Panama; Alberto Murrel; José Demera; Jhan Wisdom; Chamar Chambers	3:16.04	Nicaragua; Jair Díaz; Yeykell Romero; Kelvin Ramírez; Dexter Mayorga	3:16.09	El Salvador; Joseph Hernández; Samuel Ibáñez; Ronal Moreno; José Salazar	3:17.67
10,000 metres track walk	Gabriel Alvarado; Nicaragua	43:55.29	Juan Manuel Calderón; Costa Rica	44:04.35	Only 2 participants	
High jump	Jaime Escobar; Panama	1.99	Marlon Colorado; El Salvador	1.96	Fredy Lemus; Guatemala	1.96
Pole vault	Christiaan Higueros; Guatemala	4.82 CR	Daniel Machado; El Salvador	4.60	Marvin Larios; Nicaragua	3.90
Long jump	Adrian Alvarado; Panama	7.33	Rolando Francisco; Panama	7.10	Rasheed Miller; Costa Rica	7.04
Triple jump	Fredy Lemus; Guatemala	14.99	Jason Castro; Honduras	14.93	Elias Ocampo; Costa Rica	14.14
Shot put	Zack Short; Honduras	18.66	Carlos Avilés; El Salvador	16.65	Pablo Abarca; Costa Rica	16.49
Discus throw	Zack Short; Honduras	50.74	Carlos Avilés; El Salvador	50.42	Winston Campbell; Honduras	50.07
Hammer throw	Dylan Suárez; Costa Rica	58.53	David Ayala; Costa Rica	56.00	Carlos Arteaga; Nicaragua	55.76
Javelin throw	Luis Taracena; Guatemala	68.68	Iván Sibaja; Costa Rica	63.53	Armando Caballero; Panama	60.38
Decathlon	Youssef Qasem; Guatemala	5967	Jorge Castillo; Panama	5343	Carlos Almendarez; Nicaragua	4922

=== Women ===
Event	Gold		Silver		Bronze	
100 metres (wind: +1.3 m/s)	Mariandreé Chacón; Guatemala	11.97	María Alejandra Carmona; Nicaragua	12.69	Amanda King; Panama	12.92
200 metres (wind: +0.6 m/s)	Mariandreé Chacón; Guatemala	23.97	María Alejandra Carmona; Nicaragua	25.45	Nayeli Mendoza; Nicaragua	26.42
400 metres	Desire Bermúdez; Costa Rica	55.53	Ingrid Narváez; Nicaragua	55.97	Katherine Torres; Panama	58.37
800 metres	Angeline Pondler; Costa Rica	2:11.63	Mónica Vargas; Costa Rica	2:15.09	Ingrid Narváez; Nicaragua	2:15.46
1500 metres	Priscila María Solis; Panama	4:41.65	Mónica Vargas; Costa Rica	4:44.57	Andrea Calvo; Costa Rica	4:53.51
5000 metres	Sandra Raxón; Guatemala	17:21.30	Priscila Solis; Costa Rica	18:08.44	Andrea Calvo; Costa Rica	18:21.65
10,000 metres	Sandra Raxón; Guatemala	39:06.93	Priscila Solis; Costa Rica	39:12.69	Only two participants	
100 metres hurdles (wind: -0.8 m/s)	Nancy Sandoval; El Salvador	14.36	Nathalie Almendárez; El Salvador	15.73	Akane García; Panama	16.99
400 metres hurdles	Daniela Rojas; Costa Rica	58.83	Leyka Archibold; Panama	63.54	Only two participants	
3000 metres steeplechase^{†}	Mónica Vargas; Costa Rica	11:24.63	Only one participant			
4 × 100 metres relay	Nicaragua; Nayeli Mendoza; María Alejandra Carmona; Jessica Green; Ingrid Narváez	49.52	Costa Rica; Mariel Brokke; María Rodríguez; Vielka Arias; Abigail Obando	50.22	Guatemala; Thelma Fuentes; Estefany Cruz; Ashley Escobar; Mariandrée Chacón	50.32
4 × 400 metres relay	Costa Rica; Desire Bermúdez; Angeline Pondler; Mónica Vargas; Daniela Rojas	3:51.16	Nicaragua; Yaxury Guido; Jessica Green; María Alejandra Carmona; Ingrid Narváez	3:59.75	Panama; Leyka Archibold; Suyeris Guerra; Jennifer Rodríguez; Katherine Torres	4:08.80
10,000 metres track walk	María Fernanda Peinado; Guatemala	49:50.66	Sharon Herrera; Costa Rica	52:04.14	Elena Zeledón; Nicaragua	1:04:18.06
High jump	Abigail Obando; Costa Rica	1.75	Maria José Rodriguez; Costa Rica	1.63	Ana Isabela González; El Salvador	1.63
Pole vault	Andrea Michelle Velasco; El Salvador	3.90 CR	Andrea Machuca; El Salvador	3.10	Fátima Soto; El Salvador	3.00
Long jump	Thelma Fuentes; Guatemala	6.02	Estefany Cruz; Guatemala	5.42	Rebeca Barrientos; El Salvador	5.40
Triple jump	Thelma Fuentes; Guatemala	13.30 CR	Estefany Cruz; Guatemala	11.77	Rebeca Barrientos; El Salvador	11.76
Shot put	Deisheline Mayers; Costa Rica	12.95	Karina Espinoza; Guatemala	12.82	Dalila Rugama; Nicaragua	12.77
Discus throw	Aixa Middleton; Panama	46.90	Estefani Sosa; Guatemala	43.28	Alejandra Rosales; El Salvador	41.42
Hammer throw	Gabrielle Figueroa; Honduras	56.95	Sophie Pérez; Costa Rica	53.33	Daniela Cortes; Costa Rica	51.47 NR
Javelin throw	Dalila Rugama; Nicaragua	48.11	Esther Padilla; Honduras	43.40	Amanda Short; Honduras	40.57
Heptathlon	Mariel Brokke; Costa Rica	4301	Jennifer Rodríguez; Panama	4105	Only two participants	

=== Mixed ===
Event	Gold		Silver		Bronze
4 × 400 metres relay	Costa Rica; Emmanuel Niño; Daniela Rojas; José Elizondo; Desire Bermúdez	3:29.93	Nicaragua; Jeffrey Arcia; María Alejandra Carmona; Joan Potosme; Nayeli Mendoza	3:49.00	Only two starting teams

† Exhibition

== Medal table ==
* Host nation (Nicaragua)

Rank	Nation	Gold	Silver	Bronze	Total
1	Guatemala (GUA)	14	6	3	23
2	Costa Rica (CRC)	13	14	8	35
3	Panama (PAN)	7	7	8	22
4	Nicaragua (NIC)*	4	8	10	22
5	El Salvador (ESA)	4	8	7	19
6	Honduras	3	2	3	8
Totals (6 entries)		45	45	39	129
