= Athletics at the 2023 Pan American Games – Men's 400 metres =

Men's 400 metres at the 2023 Pan American Games
- Venue: Julio Martínez National Stadium
- Dates: October 30 – November 2
- Competitors: 11 from 9 nations
- Winning time: 45.77

Medalists
Gold medal	Lucas Conceição	Brazil
Silver medal	Luis Avilés	Mexico
Bronze medal	Martín Kouyoumdjian	Chile

The men's 400 metres competition of the athletics events at the 2023 Pan American Games was held on October 30 and November 2 at the Julio Martínez National Stadium of Santiago, Chile.

== Records ==
Prior to this competition, the existing world and Pan American Games records were as follows:

World record	Wayde van Niekerk (RSA)	43.03	Rio de Janeiro, Brazil	August 14, 2016
Pan American Games record	Ronnie Ray (USA)	44.45	Mexico City, Mexico	October 18, 1975

== Schedule ==
Date	Time	Round
October 30, 2023	18:10	Semifinal
November 2, 2023	20:31	Final

== Results ==
=== Semifinal ===
Qualification: First 2 in each heat (Q) and next 2 fastest (q) qualified for the final. The results were as follows:

==== Heat 1 ====
Rank	Lane	Athlete	Nation	Time	Notes
1	7	Lucas Carvalho	Brazil	46.79	Q
2	6	Elián Larregina	Argentina	46.90	Q
3	8	Martín Kouyoumdjian	Chile	46.91	Q
4	5	Jhon Perlaza	Colombia	47.06	q
5	4	Ezequiel Suárez	Dominican Republic	47.40	
6	3	Nery Peñalosa	Bolivia	50.97	

==== Heat 2 ====
Rank	Lane	Athlete	Nation	Time	Notes
1	4	Lucas Conceição	Brazil	45.76	Q
2	6	Luis Avilés	Mexico	45.84	Q
3	5	Anthony Zambrano	Colombia	46.01	Q
4	7	Richard Kuykendoll	United States	47.36	q
5	8	Leonardo Castillo	Puerto Rico	48.23	

=== Final ===
The results were as follows:

Rank	Lane	Name	Nationality	Time	Notes
1st place, gold medalist(s)	5	Lucas Conceição	Brazil	45.77	
2nd place, silver medalist(s)	6	Luis Avilés	Mexico	45.97	
3rd place, bronze medalist(s)	3	Martín Kouyoumdjian	Chile	46.58	
4	7	Lucas Carvalho	Brazil	46.84	
5	2	Jhon Perlaza	Colombia	47.32	
6	1	Richard Kuykendoll	United States	48.66	
7	4	Elián Larregina	Argentina	50.90	
8	8	Anthony Zambrano	Colombia	DQ	TR 17.3.1
