= Grace Claxton =

Puerto Rican female sprinter

Grace Claxton OLY
Personal information
- Full name: Grace Juliette Claxton Joseph
- Born: August 19, 1993 (age 32) San Juan, Puerto Rico
- Education: University of Albany
- Height: 1.60 m (5 ft 3 in)
- Weight: 54 kg (119 lb)

Sport
- Sport: Track and field
- Event: 400 metres hurdles
- College team: Albany Great Danes
- Coached by: Roberto Vives
- Updated on August 16, 2016

Grace Juliette Claxton Joseph (born August 19, 1993) is a Puerto Rican hurdler and sprinter. She won the 400 metres hurdles at the 2024 Ibero-American Championships. She competed at the 2016 and 2024 Summer Olympics.

== Career ==
Claxton finished 13th in the 400 meters at the 2011 Central American and Caribbean Championships. She also competed in the 400 metres at the 2012 World Junior Championships and advanced into the semifinals, where she finished 16th. At the 2013 Central American and Caribbean Championships, she placed ninth in the 400 meters. She then finished fourth in the 400 meters at the 2014 NACAC U23 Championships.

Claxton represented Puerto Rico at the 2015 Pan American Games in the 4 × 400 metres relay, finishing sixth. At the 2016 World Indoor Championships, she advanced into the 400 metres semifinals and finished 11th. At the 2016 NCAA Championships East Preliminary Round, she ran the 400 metres hurdles in 55.90 seconds and met the entry standard for the 2016 Summer Olympics. There, she finished third in her heat with a time of 56.40 and advanced into the semifinals. She ran a personal best of 55.85 in the semifinals but did not advance into the finals.

At the 2017 World Championships, Claxton advanced into the 400 metres hurdles semifinals and placed 16th. She then finished 27th in the 400 metres at the 2018 World Indoor Championships. At the 2019 Pan American Games, she finished sixth in the 400 metres hurdles with a time of 56.04.

Claxton won a bronze medal in the 400 metres hurdles at the 2022 Ibero-American Championships. She then competed at the 2022 World Athletics Championships and finished 26th in the 400 metres hurdles heats. She won the 400 metres hurdles title at the 2024 Ibero-American Championships with a time of 55.41.

Claxton qualified to represent Puerto Rico at the 2024 Summer Olympics in the 400 metres hurdles but failed to advance from the repechage round. She finished 34th in the 400 metres hurdles at the 2025 World Athletics Championships.

== Personal life ==
Claxton graduated from the University of Albany with a bachelor’s degree in public health and a minor in business in 2017. She has a son who was born in 2023.

== Competition record ==
Year	Competition	Venue	Position	Event	Notes
Representing Puerto Rico
2011	Central American and Caribbean Championships	Mayagüez, Puerto Rico	13th (h)	400 m	54.76
2011	Central American and Caribbean Championships	Mayagüez, Puerto Rico	5th	4 × 400 m relay	3:39.37
2012	World Junior Championships	Barcelona, Spain	16th (sf)	400 m	54.42
2013	Central American and Caribbean Championships	Morelia, Mexico	9th (h)	400 m	53.98
2013	Central American and Caribbean Championships	Morelia, Mexico	4th	4 × 400 m relay	3:38.13
2014	NACAC U23 Championships	Kamloops, Canada	4th	400 m	53.55
2015	Central American Championships	Managua, Nicaragua	1st^{1}	4 × 400 m relay	3:35.71
2015	Pan American Games	Toronto, Canada	6th	4 × 400 m relay	3:33.16
2016	World Indoor Championships	Portland, United States	11th (sf)	400 m	53.67
2016	Olympic Games	Rio de Janeiro, Brazil	14th (sf)	400 m hurdles	55.85
2017	World Championships	London, United Kingdom	16th (sf)	400 m hurdles	56.40
2018	World Indoor Championships	Birmingham, United Kingdom	27th (h)	400 m	53.92
2018	Central American and Caribbean Games	Barranquilla, Colombia	8th	400 m hurdles	56.77
2018	Central American and Caribbean Games	Barranquilla, Colombia	5th	4 × 400 m relay	3:33.65
2019	Pan American Games	Lima, Peru	6th	400 m hurdles	56.04
2019	Pan American Games	Lima, Peru	5th	4 × 400 m relay	3:32.03
2022	Ibero-American Championships	La Nucía, Spain	3rd	400 m hurdles	55.66
2022	World Championships	Eugene, United States	26th (h)	400 m hurdles	56.40
2022	NACAC Championships	Freeport, Bahamas	4th	400 m hurdles	56.37
2024	World Indoor Championships	Glasgow, United Kingdom	20th (h)	400 m	54.62
2024	Ibero-American Championships	Cuiabá, Brazil	1st	400 m hurdles	55.41
2024	Olympic Games	Paris, France	15th (rep)	400 m hurdles	55.94
2025	NACAC Championships	Freeport, Bahamas	5th	400 m hurdles	55.67
2025	World Championships	Tokyo, Japan	34th (h)	400 m hurdles	56.14
2026	Ibero-American Championships	Lima, Peru	1st	400 m hurdles	55.74
2026	Central American and Caribbean Games	Santo Domingo, Dominican Republic	2nd	400 m hurdles	55.40
2026	Central American and Caribbean Games	Santo Domingo, Dominican Republic	3rd	4 × 400 m relay	3:29.30

^{1}Out of competition performance

== Personal bests ==
All information taken from World Athletics profile. Outdoor

- 200 metres – 24.38 (-0.6 m/s, Ponce 2013)
- 400 metres – 53.42 (Ponce 2014)
- 400 metres hurdles – 55.85 (Rio de Janeiro 2016)

Indoor

- 400 metres – 52.89 (Boston 2016)
