= List of Costa Rican records in athletics =

The following are the national records in athletics in Costa Rica maintained by its national athletics federation: Federación Costarricense de Atletismo (FECOA). So far FECOA maintains an official list only in outdoor events.

== Outdoor ==
Key to tables: Awaiting ratification Record not kept by FECOA Not ratified or later rescinded by FECOA

=== Men ===
Event	Record	Athlete	Date	Meet	Place	Ref.
100 m	10.22 (+0.2 m/s)	Alejandro Ricketts	24 April 2026	Campeonato Nacional Interclubes y Municipios	Bogotá, Colombia	
200 m	20.20 (+0.2 m/s)	Nery Brenes	16 August 2016	Olympic Games	Rio de Janeiro, Brazil	
300 m	32.22	Nery Brenes	28 June 2017	Golden Spike Ostrava	Ostrava, Czech Republic	
400 m	44.60	Nery Brenes	23 June 2016	Meeting de Atletismo Madrid	Madrid, Spain	
800 m	1:48.06	Juan Diego Castro	15 May 2021	Big 12 Championships	Manhattan, United States	
1500 m	3:40.25	Juan Diego Castro	15 April 2023	Bryan Clay Invitational	Azusa, United States	
3000 m	8:07.3 h	Eric Quiros	29 May 2001		Richmond, Canada	
5000 m	13:44.99 (Note: by World Athletics source; rounded 13:45.00 by federation source)	Eric Quiros	27 May 2000		Victoria, Canada	
10,000 m	28:48.4 h	Rafael Angel Perez	8 May 1976		Knoxville, United States	
10 km (road)	29:54	Eric Quiros	18 December 1999		Cali, Colombia	
15 km (road)	44:30	Ronald Lanzoni	13 July 1986		Utica, United States	
20 km (road)	1:00:23	Jose Luis Molina	6 September 1993		New Haven, United States	
Half marathon	1:02:57	Jose Luis Molina	22 September 1996		Philadelphia, United States	
Marathon	2:13:23	José Luis Molina	3 March 1996	Los Angeles Marathon	Los Angeles, United States	
110 m hurdles	14.56	Alex Foster	11 May 1996	Ibero-American Championships	Medellín, Colombia	
300 m hurdles	35.61	Gerald Drummond	26 April 2025	Xiamen Diamond League	Xiamen, China	
400 m hurdles	48.11	Gerald Drummond	6 May 2023	Central American Championships	San José, Costa Rica	
3000 m steeplechase	8:48.59 (Note: by World Athletics source; rounded 8:48.60 by federation source)	Francisco Gómez	25 April 2004		Havana, Cuba	
High jump	2.15 m	Henry Linton	9 May 2009		San José, Costa Rica	
Pole vault	5.20 m	Róger Borbón	11 July 1998		San Antonio, United States	
Long jump	7.87 m (−0.2 m/s)	Rasheed Miller	27 April 2025		San José, Costa Rica	
Triple jump	15.66 m	Vance Parks	14 May 1989		Normal, United States	
Shot put	17.22 m	Pablo Abarca	10 June 2022	Meeting USMA	Migne Auxances, France	
Discus throw	54.50 m	Jeims Molina	26 April 2025	Aggie Invitational	Logan, United States	
Hammer throw	77.15 m	Roberto Sawyers	12 June 2016		Liberec, Czech Republic	
Javelin throw	82.15 m	Ivan Sibaja	6 August 2026	CAC Games	Santo Domingo, Dominican Republic	
Decathlon	6663 pts	Noah Swaby	11–12 May 2023	SEC Championships	Baton Rouge, United States	
Decathlon	100m (wind) / Long jump (wind) / Shot put / High jump / 400m / 110m H (wind) / Discus / Pole vault / Javelin / 1500m; 11.62 (+0.4 m/s) / 6.47 m (±0.0 m/s) / 14.42 m / 1.77 m / 54.17 / 18.04 (+2.5 m/s) / 44.76 m / 3.90 m / 57.73 m / 4:40.19					
Decathlon	7193 pts NWI	Noah Swaby	9–10 May 2026	Costa Rican Championships	Limón, Costa Rica	
Decathlon	100m (wind) / Long jump (wind) / Shot put / High jump / 400m / 110m H (wind) / Discus / Pole vault / Javelin / 1500m; 11.42 (+0.2 m/s) / 6.48 m NWI / 14.25 m / 1.85 m / 51.62 / 15.23 (±0.0 m/s) / 42.00 m / 4.20 m / 59.33 m / 4:45.15					
5000 m walk (track)	19:48.90	Allan Segura	8 June 2006		San José, Costa Rica	
10,000 m walk (track)	41:27.80	Allan Segura	28 March 2009		San José, Costa Rica	
20,000 m walk (track)	1:25:06.83 (Note: by World Athletics and official result source; rounded 1:25:06 by federation source)	Allan Segura	26 June 2011	Central American Championships	San José, Costa Rica	
20 km walk (road)	1:23:12	Allan Segura	10 May 2008	IAAF World Race Walking Cup	Cheboksary, Russia	
35 km walk (road)	2:50:21	Deiby Cordero	23 April 2022	Dudinská Päťdesiatka	Dudince, Slovakia	
50 km walk (road)	4:16:25	Deiby Cordero	20 March 2021	Dudinská Päťdesiatka	Dudince, Slovakia	
4 × 100 m relay	40.44	Costa Rica; Guzmán; Calimore; Monge; Allen	22 June 2019	Central American Championships	Managua, Nicaragua	
4 × 400 m relay	3:05.11	Costa Rica; Gary Robinson; Nery Brenes; Jarlex Lynch; Gerald Drummond	24 July 2015	Pan American Games	Toronto, Canada	

=== Women ===
Event	Record	Athlete	Date	Meet	Place	Ref.
100 m	11.46 (+1.6 m/s)	Sharolyn Joseph	21 July 2015	Pan American Games	Toronto, Canada	
200 m	23.70 (+1.9 m/s)	Sharolyn Joseph	23 July 2015	Pan American Games	Toronto, Canada	
400 m	52.57	Zoila Stewart	25 November 1993	Central American and Caribbean Games	Ponce, Puerto Rico	
800 m	2:05.98	Maureen Stewart	5 June 1988		San Juan, Puerto Rico	
1500 m	4:31.30 (Note: ratified by federation but not recognised by World Athletics)	Marcela Jackson	19 May 1998		Maracaibo, Venezuela	
1500 m	4:31.46	Marcela Jackson	16 May 1997		Havana, Cuba	
3000 m	9:50.56	Gabriela Traña	8 August 2004		Huelva, Spain	
5000 m	17:15.20	Gabriela Traña	7 August 2004		Huelva, Spain	
5 km (road)	17:00+	Diana Bogantes	10 June 2023	New York Mini 10K	New York City, United States	
10,000 m	34:35.74	Diana Bogantes	27 June 2021	Central American Championships	San José, Costa Rica	
10 km (road)	34:19+	Diana Bogantes	10 June 2023	Mastercard New York Mini 10K	New York City, United States	
15 km (road)	52:57+	Diana Bogantes	3 December 2023	Valencia Marathon	Valencia, Spain	
20 km (road)	1:09:13+	Diana Bogantes	10 November 2024	B.A.A. Half Marathon	Boston, United States	
Half marathon	1:12:46	Diana Bogantes	10 November 2024	B.A.A. Half Marathon	Boston, United States	
25 km (road)	1:28:41+	Diana Bogantes	3 December 2023	Valencia Marathon	Valencia, Spain	
30 km (road)	1:46:49+	Diana Bogantes	3 December 2023	Valencia Marathon	Valencia, Spain	
Marathon	2:32:08	Diana Bogantes	3 December 2023 (Note: by official result and World Athletics sources; 3 October 2023 by FECOA source, a typo)	Valencia Marathon	Valencia, Spain	
100 m hurdles	12.64 (+0.3 m/s)	Andrea Vargas	6 October 2019	World Championships	Doha, Qatar	
400 m hurdles	55.15	Daniela Rojas	3 August 2026	CAC Games	Santo Domingo, Dominican Republic	
3000 m steeplechase	10:42.88	Maria Nellys Chaves	7 August 2026	CAC Games	Santo Domingo, Dominican Republic	
High jump	1.78 m	Abigail Obando	6 May 2023	Central American Championships	San José, Costa Rica	
Pole vault	3.75 m	Vielka Arias	7 July 2023	Central American and Caribbean Games	San Salvador, El Salvador	
Long jump	5.95 m (−1.1 m/s)	Ana María Porras	25 September 2013		Tegucigalpa, Honduras	
Triple jump	12.03 m (+0.2 m/s)	Amanda Muñoz	30 May 2021	Costa Rican Championships	San José, Costa Rica	
Shot put	14.90 m	Deisheline Mayers	9 July 2021	NACAC U18 U20 and U23 Championships	San José, Costa Rica	
Discus throw	46.40 m	Haydee Grijalba	6 December 2020	Costa Rican Championships	San José, Costa Rica	
Hammer throw	51.47 m	Daniela Francini	3 July 2022	Central American Championships	Managua, Nicaragua	
Javelin throw	45.89 m	Génova Arias	12 March 2013	Central American Games	San José, Costa Rica	
Heptathlon	4954 pts	Ana María Porras	13–14 July 2018	Central American Championships	Guatemala City, Guatemala	
Heptathlon	100m H (wind) / High jump / Shot put / 200m (wind) / Long jump (wind) / Javelin / 800m; 14.72 (+1.2 m/s) / 1.58 m / 10.65 m / 26.08 (NWI) / 5.87 m (+1.3 m/s) / 31.50 m / 2:30.52					
5000 m walk (track)	25:41.47	Karolyn Hernández	11 May 2004		Guatemala	
10,000 m walk (track)	44:53.39	Noelia Vargas	29 May 2021	Costa Rican Championships	San José, Costa Rica	
20 km walk (road)	1:30:44	Noelia Vargas	5 June 2021		A Coruña, Spain	
50 km walk (road)						
4 × 100 m relay	46.00	Sharolyn Scott; Andrea Vargas; Desire Bermúdez; Keylin Pennant	22 June 2019	Central American Championships	Managua, Nicaragua	
4 × 400 m relay	3:40.23	Costa Rica; Irma Harris Brown; Sharolyn Scott; Daniela Rojas Gutierrez; Desire Bermudez Villarebia	2 August 2018	CAC Games	Barranquilla, Colombia	

== Indoor ==
=== Men ===
Event	Record	Athlete	Date	Meet	Place	Ref.
60 m	6.71	Bob Colville	8 January 2005		Ann Arbor, United States	
200 m	22.07	Bob Colville	28 January 2006		Ypsilanti, United States	
200 m	22.07	Bob Colville	11 February 2006		Ypsilanti, United States	
200 m	21.79 OT	Bob Colville	4 February 2006		Akron, United States	
400 m	45.11	Nery Brenes	10 March 2012	World Championships	Istanbul, Turkey	
800 m	1:48.29	Juan Diego Castro	12 February 2021	Texas Tech Shootout	Lubbock, United States	
1000 m	2:24.05	Juan Diego Castro	17 January 2020	Arkansas Invitational	Fayetteville, United States	
1500 m						
Mile	3:57.78	Juan Diego Castro	7 February 2021	American Track League #3	Fayetteville, United States	
3000 m	8:26.28	Alvaro Sanabria	13 January 2018	Graduate Classic	Lincoln, United States	
60 m hurdles						
High jump						
Pole vault						
Long jump	6.45 m	Enrique Colville	29 January 2005		Ypsilanti, United States	
Triple jump	13.36 m	Enrique Colville	27 January 2006		Ypsilanti, United States	
Shot put	16.49 m	Pablo Abarca	8 January 2022		Vouneuil-sous-Biard, France	
Weight throw	21.15 m	Roberto Sawyers	16 February 2013	Millrose Games	New York, United States	
Heptathlon						
Heptathlon	60m / Long jump / Shot put / High jump / 60m H / Pole vault / 1000m					
3000 m walk	12:51.93	Sergio Gutierrez	17 March 2006		Linz, Austria	
5000 m walk						
4 × 400 m relay						

=== Women ===
Event	Record	Athlete	Date	Meet	Place	Ref.
60 m	7.48	Sharolyn Joseph-Hamblett	4 February 2017	Hillsdale "Wide-Track" Classic	Hillsdale, United States	
200 m	24.87	Zoila Stewart	28 February 1998		Lincoln, United States	
400 m	56.43	Zoila Stewart	27 February 1999		Lincoln, United States	
400 m	54.93 OT	Zoila Stewart	24 January 1998		Johnson City, United States	
800 m	2:07.72	Maureen Stewart	6 March 1987	World Championships	Indianapolis, United States	
1500 m						
3000 m						
60 m hurdles	8.08	Andrea Vargas	12 February 2022	American Track League	Louisville, United States	
High jump						
Pole vault						
Long jump						
Triple jump						
Shot put						
Pentathlon						
Pentathlon	60m H / High jump / Shot put / Long jump / 800m					
3000 m walk						
4 × 400 m relay						
