= Edymar Brea =

Venezuelan athlete

Edymar Brea Abreu
Personal information
- Nationality: Venezuelan
- Born: 3 March 1997 (age 29)
- Height: 1.75 m (5 ft 9 in)
- Weight: 55 kg (121 lb)

Sport
- Sport: Athletics
- Events: 5000m, 10000m

Achievements and titles
- Personal bests: 5000m: 15:41.30 (Nerja 2023); 10000m: 32:29.73 (Burjassot 2023)
Medal record
Representing Venezuela
South American Championships
| Gold medal – first place | 2021 Guayaquil | 5000 m |
| Gold medal – first place | 2021 Guayaquil | 10,000 m |
| Silver medal – second place | 2025 Mar del Plata | 5000 m |
| Bronze medal – third place | 2025 Mar del Plata | 10,000 m |
Central American and Caribbean Games
| Silver medal – second place | 2026 Santo Domingo | 5000 m |
| Bronze medal – third place | 2026 Santo Domingo | 10,000 m |

Edymar Brea Abreu (born 3 March 1997) is a Venezuelan long-distance runner. She is a double South American champion, over 5000 metres and 10,000 metres. She is also the Venezuelan national record holder in the 10,000 metres.

== Early and personal life ==
Brea's sister, Joselyn Brea, is also a world class athlete. The two competed together in the 5000m at the 2022 World Athletics Championships. Edymar moved to Galicia in Spain in 2016 and is based in Pontevedra. Her sister and mother across made the move to Spain.

== Career ==
In 2021, Brea set a new national record in the 10,000 metres, running 33:09:93 in the Spanish town of Torrevieja. The previous Venezuelan record had belonged to her sister Joselyn, who had set 34:10.63 five years previously in Maia, Portugal.

She became a double champion at the 2021 South American Games, winning both the 5000m and 10,000m in 2021 in Guayaquil.

In March 2023, Brea lowered her national record in the 10,000 metres in Burjassot, Spain. She set a time of 32:29:73 to break her own mark of two years previously.

In April 2025, she won the silver medal over 5000 metres and the bronze medal over 10,000 metres at the 2025 South American Championships in Athletics in Argentina.

In August 2026, she won the silver medal in the 5000 metres and the bronze medal in the 10,000 metres at the 2026 CAC Games in Santo Domingo, Dominican Republic.
