= Anisleidis Ochoa =

Cuban athlete (born 2000)

Personal information
- Born: October 4, 2000 (age 25)

Sport
- Sport: Athletics
- Event: Long-distance running

Achievements and titles
- Personal bests: 3000m: 9:36.30 (2022); 5000m: 15:31.35 (2025) NR; 10000m: 33:13.0 (2025) NR; 3000m S'chase: 4:06.39 (2026); Road; Half marathon: 1:15:21 (2024)
Medal record
Representing Cuba
Pan American Championships
Gold medal – first place	2026 Medellín	5000 m
Central American and Caribbean Games
Gold medal – first place	2026 Santo Domingo	5000 m
Gold medal – first place	2026 Santo Domingo	3000 m S’chase
Silver medal – second place	2026 Santo Domingo	1500 m
NACAC Championships
Gold medal – first place	2025 Freeport	5000 m
Silver medal – second place	2025 Freeport	10,000 m

Anisleidis Ochoa (born 4 October 2000) is a Cuban long-distance runner. She is a multiple time national champion and national record holder over 5000 metres and 10,000 metres. She was a gold and silver medalist at the 2025 NACAC Championships over 5000 and 10,000 metres.

== Biography ==
Ochoa was fifth over 5000 metres at the 2022 NACAC Championships. In April 2023, she won gold medals over 5000 and 10,000 metres in Caracas at the 2023 ALBA Games. In September 2023, she set a new Cuban national record over 10,000 metres in Havana of 33:29.90. She placed sixth over 10,000 metres at the 2023 Pan American Games in Santiago, Chile.

In February 2025, she made her debut in a 10k run on the road in Cartago, Costa Rica, winning in 33:48 to set a new Cuban national record at the Clásica Candelaria Internacional. She won the gold medal over 5000 metres at the 2025 NACAC Championships in Freeport, Bahamas, in August 2025. She was also the silver medalist over 10,000 metres at the championships.

In June 2026, she won the 5000 metres gold medal at the 2026 Pan American Athletics Championships in Medellín. In August, she won gold medals in the 5000 metres and 3000 metres steeplechase, and the silver medal in the 1500 metres at the 2026 CAC Games in Santo Domingo, Dominican Republic.

== Personal life ==
Ochoa is from Guantánamo Province.
