= List of Cuban records in athletics =

The following are the national records in athletics in Cuba maintained by its national athletics federation: Federación Cubana de Atletismo (FCA).

== Outdoor ==
Key to tables: Awaiting ratification Record not kept by FCA Not ratified or later rescinded by FCA

=== Men ===
Event	Record	Athlete	Date	Meet	Place	Ref.
100 m	9.90 (±0.0 m/s)	Shainer Reginfo	1 June 2024	XXVI Trofeo de Atletismo Ciudad de Salamanca - Memorial Carlos Gil Perez	Salamanca, Spain	
200 m	19.63 (+1.2 m/s)	Reynier Mena	3 July 2022	Resisprint International	La Chaux-de-Fonds, Switzerland	
300 m	31.48	Roberto Hernández	3 September 1990		Jerez de la Frontera, Spain	
400 m	44.14	Roberto Hernández	30 May 1990		Seville, Spain	
500 m	59.32	Orestes Rodriguez	5 February 2013		La Habana, Cuba	
600 m	1:13.9 h	Raidel Acea	20 April 2013		La Habana, Cuba	
800 m	1:42.85	Norberto Téllez	31 July 1996	Olympic Games	Atlanta, United States	
1500 m	3:35.03	Maurys Surel Castillo	7 June 2012	8th Meeting Iberoamericano de Atletismo	Huelva, Spain	
3000 m	7:58.3	Maurys Surel Castillo	20 June 2009		Havana, Cuba	
5000 m	13:44.8 a	Luis Medina	21 June 1977		Prague, Czechoslovakia	
10,000 m	28:48.96	Alberto Cuba	10 February 1989		Havana, Cuba	
10 km (road)	29:45	Aguelmis Rojas	18 December 2010	Corrida de San Fernando	Montevideo, Uruguay	
Half marathon	1:03:48	Aguelmis Rojas	14 October 2007	World Road Running Championships	Udine, Italy	
Marathon	2:10:53	Alberto Cuba	13 December 1992		Ciudad de Mérida, Mexico	
110 m hurdles	12.87 (+0.9 m/s)	Dayron Robles	12 June 2008	Golden Spike Ostrava	Ostrava, Czech Republic	
300 m hurdles	36.00	Yoao Illas	1 April 2023	Felix Sánchez Classic	Santo Domingo, Dominican Republic	
400 m hurdles	47.99 A	Omar Cisneros	27 October 2011	Pan American Games	Guadalajara, Mexico	
3000 m steeplechase	8:26.16	José Sanchez	19 June 2009		Havana, Cuba	
High jump	2.45 m	Javier Sotomayor	27 July 1993		Salamanca, Spain	
Pole vault	5.90 m	Lázaro Borges	29 August 2011	World Championships	Daegu, South Korea	
Long jump	8.71 m (+1.9 m/s)	Iván Pedroso	18 July 1995		Salamanca, Spain	
Triple jump	18.08 m (±0.0 m/s)	Pedro Pablo Pichardo	28 May 2015	Copa Cuba-Memorial Barrientos	Havana, Cuba	
Shot put	20.78 m	Alexis Paumier	29 July 2000		Havana, Cuba	
Discus throw	71.06 m	Luis Delís	21 May 1983		Havana, Cuba	
Hammer throw	78.02 m	Roberto Janet	28 May 2015	Copa Cuba-Memorial Barrientos	Havana, Cuba	
Javelin throw	87.20 m A	Guillermo Martínez	28 October 2011	Pan American Games	Guadalajara, Mexico	
Decathlon	8654 pts	Leonel Suárez	3–4 July 2009	Central American and Caribbean Championships	Havana, Cuba	
Decathlon	100m (wind) / Long jump (wind) / Shot put / High jump / 400m / 110m H (wind) / Discus / Pole vault / Javelin / 1500m; 11.07 (+0.7 m/s) / 7.42 m (+0.8 m/s) / 14.39 m / 2.09 m / 47.65 / 14.15 (−0.6 m/s) / 46.07 m / 4.70 m / 77.47 m / 4:27.29					
20 km walk (road)	1:21:45	Jorge Luis Pino	30 July 2002		Matanzas, Cuba	
50 km walk (road)	3:52:19	Edel Oliva	24 March 1995	Pan American Games	Mar del Plata, Argentina	
4 × 100 m relay	38.00	Cuba; Andrés Simón; Joel Lamela; Joel Isasi; Jorge Aguilera	8 August 1992	Olympic Games	Barcelona, Spain	
4 × 200 m relay	1:22.06	O. Rodríguez; O. Pellicier; R. Acea; Y. Lescay	15 February 2014		Havana, Cuba	
4 × 400 m relay	2:59.13	Cuba; Lázaro Martínez; Héctor Herrera; Norberto Téllez; Roberto Hernández	7 August 1992	Olympic Games	Barcelona, Spain	

=== Women ===
Event	Record	Athlete	Date	Meet	Place	Ref.	Video
100 m	11.10 (+1.6 m/s)	Liliana Allen	13 July 1992		Salamanca, Spain		
200 m	22.68 (+0.7 m/s)	Roxana Díaz	4 July 2007		Salamanca, Spain		
300 m	36.50	Roxana Gómez	1 April 2023	Felix Sánchez Classic	Santo Domingo, Dominican Republic		
400 m	49.48	Roxana Gómez	18 September 2025	World Championships	Tokyo, Japan		
600 m	1:22.63 A	Ana Fidelia Quirot	25 July 1997		Guadalajara, Mexico		
800 m	1:54.44	Ana Fidelia Quirot	9 September 1989		Barcelona, Spain		
1000 m	2:33.21	Ana Fidelia Quirot	13 September 1989		Jerez de la Frontera, Spain		
1500 m	4:09.57	Adriana Muñoz	7 August 2003	Pan American Games	Santo Domingo, Dominican Republic		
3000 m	9:17.7	Yudelkis Martinez	1 July 2004		Santa Clara, Cuba		
5000 m	15:31.35	Anisleidis Ochoa	18 September 2025	World Championships	Tokyo, Japan		
10,000 m	33:13.0 h	Anisleidis Ochoa	8 March 2025	Memorial Jesús Molina	Havana, Cuba		
10 km (road)	33:49	Yesenia Centeno	8 April 2001		Barcelona, Spain		
Half marathon	1:13:23	Yesenia Centeno	15 June 2003		Seville, Spain		
Marathon	2:36:35	Emperatriz Wilson	13 December 1992		Caracas, Venezuela		
100 m hurdles	12.61 (+1.4 m/s)	Anay Tejeda	5 July 2008	Central American and Caribbean Championships	Cali, Colombia		
400 m hurdles	52.89	Daimí Pernía	25 August 1999	World Championships	Seville, Spain		
3000 m steeplechase	9:50.88	Anisleidis Ochoa	7 August 2026	CAC Games	Santo Domingo, Dominican Republic		
High jump	2.04 m	Silvia Costa	9 September 1989		Barcelona, Spain		
Pole vault	4.91 m	Yarisley Silva	2 August 2015	17th International Pole Vault Meeting	Beckum, Germany		
Long jump	6.99 m (+0.4 m/s)	Lissete Cuza	3 June 2000		Jena, Germany		
Triple jump	15.28 m	Yargelis Savigne	31 August 2007	World Championships	Osaka, Japan		
Triple jump	15.29 m (+0.3 m/s)	Yamilé Aldama	11 July 2003	Golden Gala	Rome, Italy		
Shot put	20.96 m A	Belsy Laza	2 May 1992		Mexico City, Mexico		
Discus throw	73.09 m	Yaime Pérez	13 April 2024	Oklahoma Throws Series World Invitational	Ramona, United States		
Hammer throw	76.62 m	Yipsi Moreno	9 September 2008	Hanžeković Memorial	Zagreb, Croatia		
Javelin throw	71.70 m	Osleidys Menéndez	14 August 2005	World Championships	Helsinki, Finland		
Heptathlon	6742 pts	Yorgelis Rodríguez	26–27 May 2018	Hypo-Meeting	Götzis, Austria		
Heptathlon	100m H (wind) / High jump / Shot put / 200m (wind) / Long jump (wind) / Javelin / 800m; 13.48 (+0.3 m/s) / 1.86 m / 14.95 m / 23.96 (−0.6 m/s) / 6.58 m (+2.3 m/s) / 48.65 m / 2:12.73						
Decathlon	7245 pts	Magalys García	28–29 June 2002		Vienna, Austria		
Decathlon	100m (wind) / Long jump (wind) / Shot put / High jump / 400m / 110m H (wind) / Discus / Pole vault / Javelin / 1500m						
20 km walk (road)	1:33:47	Yarcelis Sánchez	30 July 2002		Matanzas, Cuba		
4 × 100 m relay	42.89	Cuba; Miriam Ferrer; Aliuska López; Julia Duporty; Liliana Allen	22 August 1993	World Championships	Stuttgart, Germany		
4 × 400 m relay	3:23.21	Cuba; Roxana Díaz; Zulia Calatayud; Susana Clement; Indira Terrero	23 August 2008	Olympic Games	Beijing, China		
4 × 800 m relay	8:15.84	Cuba; Rose Mary Almanza; Arletis Thaureaux; Gilda Casanova; Sahily Diago	3 May 2014	IAAF World Relays	Nassau, Bahamas		
4 × 1500 m relay	24:05.6	Isabel Dickison; Guadalupe Rivero; Norma Pérez; Isis Rodríguez	13 May 1972		Havana, Cuba		

=== Mixed ===
Event	Record	Athlete	Date	Meet	Place	Ref.
4 × 400 m relay	3:13.32	Cuba; Yohandris Bientz; Camila Rodríguez; Yoandys Lescay; Roxana Gómez	3 August 2026	CAC Games	Santo Domingo, Dominican Republic	

== Indoor ==
=== Men ===
Event	Record	Athlete	Date	Meet	Place	Ref.
50 m	5.61+	Freddy Mayola	16 February 2000		Madrid, Spain	
60 m	6.48	Yenns Fernández	28 January 2024	Meeting Nazionale Assoluti 13/14° Manifestazione	Ancona, Italy	
200 m	20.46	Iván García	8 March 1997	World Championships	Paris, France	
400 m	46.09	Roberto Hernández	7 March 1987	World Championships	Indianapolis, United States	
800 m	1:46.32	Norberto Téllez	19 February 1999	Indoor Flanders Meeting	Ghent, Belgium	
1500 m	3:43.06	Maurys Surel Castillo	19 January 2013		Antequera, Spain	
Mile	4:05.80	Maurys Surel Castillo	8 February 2014	Orenburg Mile	Orenburg, Russia	
3000 m	8:09.09	Maurys Surel Castillo	23 December 2012		Seville, Spain	
50 m hurdles	6.36+	Anier García	13 February 2000	Meeting Pas de Calais	Liévin, France	
60 m hurdles	7.33	Dayron Robles	8 February 2008	PSD Bank Meeting	Düsseldorf, Germany	
400 m hurdles	49.54	Yasmani Copello	12 February 2013	International Meeting Val-de-Reuil	Val-de-Reuil, France	
High jump	2.43 m	Javier Sotomayor	4 March 1989	World Championships	Budapest, Hungary	
Pole vault	5.72 m	Lázaro Borges	11 February 2012	Pole Vault Stars	Donetsk, Ukraine	
Long jump	8.62 m	Iván Pedroso	7 March 1999	World Championships	Maebashi, Japan	
Triple jump	17.83 m	Aliecer Urrutia	1 March 1997		Sindelfingen, Germany	
Shot put	19.90 m	Paul Ruiz	13 February 1988		Sofia, Bulgaria	
Heptathlon	5964 pts	Leonel Suárez	12–13 February 2010		Tallinn, Estonia	
Heptathlon	60m / Long jump / Shot put / High jump / 60m H / Pole vault / 1000m; 7.13 / 7.13 m / 14.10 m / 2.02 m / 8.15 / 4.85 m / 2:36.12					
5000 m walk						
4 × 400 m relay	3:12.16	Cuba; Dorrmann; Héctor Herrera; Lázaro Martínez; Norberto Téllez	20 February 1993		Paris, France	

=== Women ===
Event	Record	Athlete	Date	Meet	Place	Ref.
60 m	7.12	Liliana Allen	8 March 1991	World Championships	Seville, Spain	
200 m	23.79	Liliana Allen	20 February 1990		San Sebastián, Spain	
400 m	52.02	Indira Terrero	24 February 2013	Meeting National	Metz, France	
800 m	2:04.18	Rose Mary Almanza	9 February 2016		Eaubonne, France	
1500 m	4:37.87	Dayane Huerta Venet	22 January 2016		Sabadell, Spain	
3000 m	9:46.05	Milagros Rodriguez	20 February 1993		Paris, France	
60 m hurdles	7.90	Anay Tejeda	10 February 2008	BW-Bank Meeting	Karlsruhe, Germany	
High jump	2.01 m	Ioamnet Quintero	5 March 1993		Berlin, Germany	
Pole vault	4.82 m	Yarisley Silva	24 April 2013	Drake Relays	Des Moines, United States	
Long jump	6.79 m	Yargelis Savigne	3 February 2007	Sparkassen Cup	Stuttgart, Germany	
Triple jump	15.05 m	Yargelis Savigne	8 March 2008	World Championships	Valencia, Spain	
Shot put	19.60 m	Belsis Laza	8 March 1989		Piraeus, Greece	
Pentathlon	4637 pts	Yorgelis Rodríguez	2 March 2018	World Championships	Birmingham, United Kingdom	
Pentathlon	60m H / High jump / Shot put / Long jump / 800m; 8.57 / 1.88 m / 14.15 m / 6.15 m / 2:17.70					
3000 m walk	14:11.56	Yaimara Bouzidi	16 February 2008		Bordeaux, France	
4 × 400 m relay	3:39.66	Cuba; Idalmis Bonne; Julia Duporty; Lency Montelier; Nancy McLeon	20 February 1993		Paris, France	
