= Alicia Avilés =

Costa Rican educator and activist

Alicia Avilés is a Costa Rican educator and activist. Avilés worked for 12 years as an elementary school teacher in Nicaragua. After settling in La Carpio, she helped create an arts organization, Sistema Integral de Formación Artística para la Inclusión Social (SIFAIS). Avilés is the community director of SIFAIS.

== Biography ==
Avilés was born in Managua. She was educated at Lumen Christi and at Loyola High School. She went on to become an elementary school teacher for 12 years. Avilés left Nicaragua in the 1990s when she was persecuted for her involvement in a teachers' strike in that country. She was also seeking a better economic opportunity in Costa Rica. Avilés started working as a maid.

Avilés has become the civic leader of the La Carpio neighborhood in, San José. She is the community director of the Integrated System of Art Education for Social Inclusion (Sistema Integral de Formación Artística para la Inclusión Social SIFAIS). Avilés helped create this organization along with Maris Stella Fernández in 2011. Also in 2011, Avilés helped create a youth orchestra in the neighborhood. This orchestra now plays throughout Costa Rica. SIFAIS also provides classes in various other skills.

In 2017, Avilés was honored in The Tico Times list of "Women of the Year."
