= Pedro Avilés =

Spanish novelist

Pedro Avilés Gutiérrez (Ceuta, 23 January 1956) is a Spanish novelist from Madrid.

Avilés was born in Ceuta, Spain where his father, Pedro, from Madrid, was following his military career in 1956. The mother of Pedro Aviles, Africa, was born in Ceuta though her family proceed from Tarifa, Cadiz. The family moved very soon to Madrid, when Pedro Avilés was three years old. For this reason Pedro considers himself to be from Madrid.

From his childhood, Avilés felt a very deep need to write so before beginning primary school he wrote a lot of stories. He initiated his primary school and university studies in Madrid. At twenty, he wrote his first novel, “Corpore Insepulto”, a play that "I never try to publish", say Pedro Avilés. That was continued for another novel also unpublished; “La Inercia”.

Avilés began his professional activity as a war reporter. He covered the bread war in Morocco, the Sandinista war in Nicaragua, guerra de Nicaragua, and the Yugoslav Croatian war in 1991 Later he was dedicated to be a full crime reporter in several Spanish national media just like “El Caso” and the Interviú magazine. He said he wrote 1,000 stories covering the most important issues of Spanish history between 1987 and 2006. He was responsible in “Tele Cinco” for a Unresolved Crime section between 1996 and 2000. Actually, some television Nets call him to offer his opinions about several criminal cases.

Nowadays, Avilés is fully dedicated to writing crime novels Las mariposas sobre la tumba and El whisky del muerto, are the first of a series of two starring a Crime Reporter that hates journalism. In his novels, Pedro Avilés makes a portrait and a critic of the journalism world. His experience as a crime reporter gave him background for his writing.

== Novels ==
- Corpore Insepulto, 1976
- La Inercia, 1978
- Mata al presidente, 1986
- Las mariposas sobre la tumba, 2006
- El whisky del muerto, 2007
- Katoucha, Ediciones Libralia 2014
