= Travis Williams (sprinter) =

Jamaican athlete (born 2003)

Personal information
- Nationality: Jamaican-American
- Born: 11 March 2003 (age 23)
- Home town: Bronx, NY

Sport
- Sport: Athletics
- Event: Sprint
- College team: USC Trojans

Achievements and titles
- Personal bests: 60m: 6.48 (Sherman Oaks, 2026); 100m: 9.96 (Norwalk, 2026); 200m: 20.89 (Boston, 2023)
Medal record
Men's athletics
Representing Jamaica
NACAC U23 Championships
Gold medal – first place	2023 San Jose	4x100m relay
Silver medal – second place	2023 San Jose	100m
CAC Games
Silver medal – second place	2026 Santo Domingo	4×100m relay
Silver medal – second place	2026 Santo Domingo	Mixed 4×100m relay

Travis Williams (born 11 March 2003) is a Jamaican sprinter.

== Biography ==
He attended Cardinal Hayes High School in Bronx, NY.

== Career ==
He won a silver medalist in the individual 100 metres, in a personal best 10.12 seconds, and gold medalist in the 4 × 100 m relay at the 2023 NACAC U23 Championships. He set personal bests of 6.52 seconds in the 60 metres, 10.11 in the 100m in 2024. He was a 100m semi-finalist at the 2024 Jamaican Championships.

He finished second in the 60 meters at the Big 10 Indoor Championships on 1 March 2025 in 6.59 seconds. He ran a season's best 6.54 for fifth in the men's 60m at the 2025 NCAA Indoor Championships in Virginia Beach. He was named as a reserve for the Jamaican team for the 2025 World Athletics Indoor Championships in Nanjing in March 2025.

Williams finished second with USC in the 4 x 100 metres relay at the 2025 NCAA Outdoor Championships in Eugene, Oregon, alongside Max Thomas, Taylor Banks and Garrett Kaalund, helping the University of Southern California team to a share of the overall men's title.

Williams opened his 2026 indoor season with a win in the 60 meters at Tampere Indoor Meeting, in Finland. On 11 July, Williams broke the 10-second barrier for 100 metres for the first time with 9.96 seconds (+2.0) at the Grand Sprint Series in California. He was named in the Jamaica team for the 2026 Central American and Caribbean Games.

== Personal life ==
His parents are Averil Leweing and Winston Rowe, and he has one brother, Justin. He is a Health and Human Sciences major at USC.
