= Frances Colón =

American science diplomat

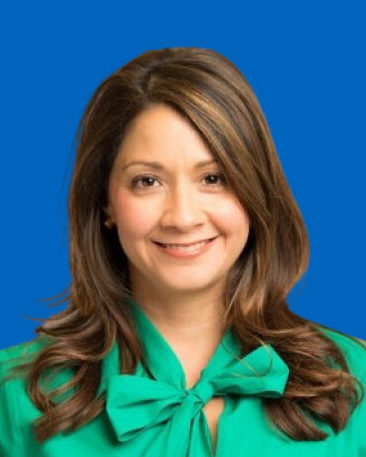
- Born: San Juan, Puerto Rico
- Education: University of Puerto Rico (BS); Brandeis University (MS, PhD)

Frances Colón is an American science diplomat and environmental policy expert most notably having served at the United States Department of State between September 2008 and January 2017. In her work, she promotes the integration of science and technology into foreign policy dialogues; global scientific engagement for capacity-building; the advancement of women in STEM; and the use of innovation as a tool for economic growth around the world.

Previously, Dr. Colón served the U.S. Department of State as the Science and Environment Adviser at the Western Hemisphere Affairs Bureau where she was responsible for advising on environmental and scientific issues that affected the U.S. Government's foreign policy objectives in the Americas. During that time, Dr. Colón coordinated climate change policy for the Energy and Climate Partnership of the Americas announced by President Barack Obama in 2009. As a AAAS Science and Technology Policy Fellow (2006–2008), Dr. Colón led the OES Bureau’s program for Muslim world outreach through K-12 science and math education cooperation.

In November 2020, Colón was named a volunteer member of the Joe Biden presidential transition Agency Review Team to support transition efforts related to the United States Department of State.

Since 2021, she has been a member of the President’s Council of Advisors on Science and Technology (PCAST).

== Early life and education ==
Dr. Colón grew up in San Juan, Puerto Rico and earned her B.S. in biology in 1997 from the University of Puerto Rico. She went on to earn her doctorate in developmental neurobiology at Brandeis University in 2004.

== Career ==
=== Science diplomacy career ===
She served nearly five years as deputy science and technology adviser to the Secretary of State (2012–2017). In that role, she became the highest-ranking Hispanic scientist at the State Department. Prior to this role, she had been an adviser on science and the environment for the Western Hemisphere Affairs at the State Department and served as acting science and technology adviser to Secretary of State John Kerry. In 2015, she represented the United States government as vice chair of the United Nations Commission on Science and Technology Development. Under Secretary of State Hillary Clinton, Colón led the Energy and Climate Partnership for the Americas (ECPA), an initiative announced by President Obama at the Summit of the Americas in April 2009 to accelerate sustainable energy in the Americas.

=== Science advocacy efforts ===
Colón is also an outspoken advocate for women and girls to pursue careers in science. During her time as Deputy Adviser, she oversaw the creation of the Networks of Diasporas in Engineering and Science (NODES) initiative to empower diasporas with science expertise to develop and influence effective policies and solve challenges in their countries of origin. As part of President Obama's White House "Untold History of Women in STEM" project, she shared the story of Puerto Rican scientist Ana Roqué de Duprey.
