= Niesha Burgher =

Jamaican athlete

Personal information
- Born: 8 August 2002 (age 24) St. Thomas, Jamaica

Sport
- Sport: Athletics
- Event: Sprints
- College team: UTEP Miners
- Club: Racers TC; Pure Athletics
- Coached by: Glen Mills; Lance Brauman

Achievements and titles
- Personal bests: 60m: 7.22 (Albuquerque, 2025); 100m: 11.06 (El Paso, 2024); 200m: 22.39 (Kingston, 2024)
Medal record
Women's athletics
Representing Jamaica
CAC Games
Silver medal – second place	2026 Santo Domingo	Mixed 4×100m relay

Niesha Burgher (born 8 August 2002) is a Jamaican sprinter. She finished third at the Jamaican national championships over 200 metres in 2024.

== Early life ==
From St. Thomas, Jamaica, she started running in competitive meets whilst still in primary school. She was educated at the Excelsior High School in Kingston, where she partook in the annual ISSA Boys and Girls Athletics Championships. She attended Western Texas College in Snyder, Texas, and the University of Texas at El Paso.

== Career ==
2023

In January 2023, in her debut race for UTEP, she broke Tobi Amusan's school record in the indoor 200 metres, running 23.20 in Albuquerque, New Mexico.

2024

She placed third in the 200 meters at the 2024 Jamaican Championships on 30 June 2024, running a personal best time of 20.39 seconds. In July 2024, she was officially selected for the Jamaican team at the 2024 Paris Olympics in the 200m, where she made it to the semi-finals.

2025

She competed at the 2025 World Athletics Relays in China in the Mixed 4 × 400 metres relay in May 2025. She qualified from her 200 metres semi-final at the 2025 Jamaican Athletics Championships in 23.45 seconds.

2026

She was named in the Jamaica team for the 2026 Central American and Caribbean Games.
