= Reynaldo Espinosa =

Cuban athlete (born 2003)

Personal information
- Born: Reynaldo R. Espinosa; 1 February 2003 (age 23)

Sport
- Sport: Athletics
- Events: 100 metres; 200 metres; 4×100 m relay

Achievements and titles
- Personal bests: 100m: 9.96 (Salamanca, 2024)
Medal record
Men's athletics
Representing Cuba
Pan American Games
Silver medal – second place	2023 Santiago	4×100 m relay

Reynaldo R. Espinosa (born 1 February 2003) is a Cuban sprinter. In 2024, he became Cuban national champion over 100 metres.

== Career ==
He reached the final of the 100 metres at the 2022 World Athletics U20 Championships in Cali, Colombia, running a time of 10.29 seconds.

He competed at the 2023 Pan American Games and was a silver medallist in the men's 4x100 metres. He set a personal best of 10.26 during the Alba Games in Caracas, Venezuela in 2023.

He lowered this to 10.19 seconds in Havana on 11 April 2024. He won the Cuban national title over 100 metres in 2024 in a time of 10.18 seconds. He ran as part of the Cuban 4 × 100 m relay team at the 2024 World Relays Championships in Nassau, Bahamas in May 2024.

On 1 June 2024, he lowered his personal best to 9.96 seconds to break the 10-second barrier for the 100 metres for the first time, at the Memorial Carlos Gil Perez in Salamanca. This time met the 2024 Paris Olympics qualifying standard and went under the previous Cuban national record of 9.98 seconds which was broken in the same race by compatriot Shainer Reginfo who ran 9.90 seconds.

He competed in the 100 metres at the 2024 Paris Olympics, where he reached the semi-finals.
