= José Luis Santana =

Mexican athlete

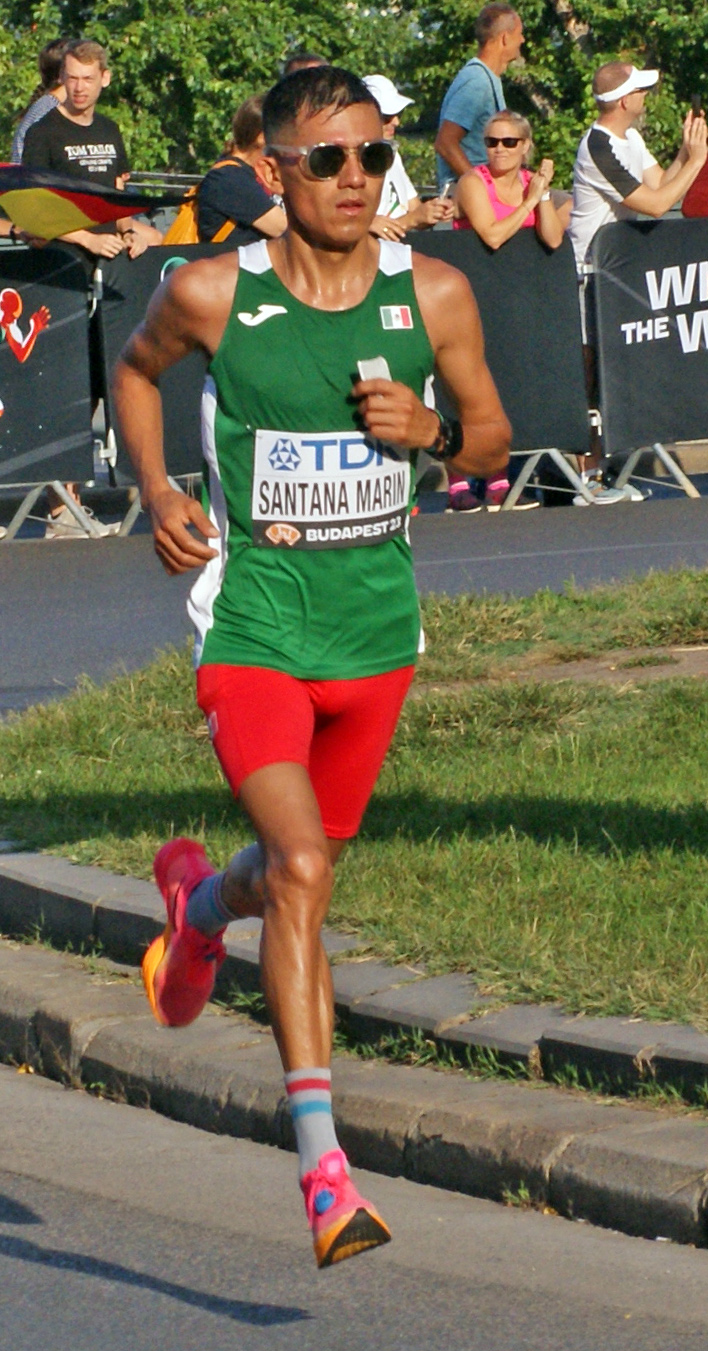
- Santana at the 2023 World Athletics Championships

Personal information
- Born: 26 September 1989 (age 36) Guadalajara, Mexico

Sport
- Sport: Marathon running
Medal record
Representing Mexico
Pan American Games
Silver medal – second place	2019 Lima	Marathon

José Luis Santana Marin (born 26 September 1989) is a Mexican marathon runner.

He ran a personal best time of 2:10:54 to earn a silver medal at the 2019 Pan American Games.

In 2020 he took part in the World Athletics Half Marathon Championships, in Gdynia, finishing 29th in a time of 1:01.11.

On 30 April 2021, he was confirmed as part of the Mexican team for the delayed 2020 Summer Games in Tokyo.
