= Luis Avilés (footballer) =

Argentine professional footballer (born 1990)

Personal information
- Full name: Luis Alberto Avilés Farías
- Date of birth: 2 July 1990 (age 36)
- Place of birth: Buenos Aires, Argentina
- Positions: Defender; midfielder

Team information
- Current team: Deportivo Español

Youth career
- Deportivo Caraza
- Unión Progresistas
- Lanús
- 2005–2008: El Porvenir

Senior career*
Years	Team	Apps	(Gls)
2008–2012	El Porvenir	38	(1)
2012–	Deportivo Español	35	(0)
- * Club domestic league appearances and goals as of 13:40, 20 May 2019 (UTC)

Luis Alberto Avilés Farías (born 2 July 1990) is an Argentine professional footballer who plays as a defender or midfielder for Deportivo Español.

== Career ==
Avilés played for Deportivo Caraza and Unión Progresistas at youth level, prior to joining the academies of Lanús and El Porvenir. He scored once in thirty-eight for El Porvenir in Primera C Metropolitana. Fellow fourth tier team Deportivo Español signed Avilés on 30 June 2012. Ten appearances occurred in his first two seasons, which concluded with promotion to Primera B Metropolitana in 2013–14. He didn't feature in 2014 or 2015, eventually making his bow in tier three during a defeat to Platense on 5 March 2016; replacing Juan Ignacio Semería after sixty-five minutes. He participated in twenty-one fixtures across the following two campaigns.

== Career statistics ==
As of 20 May 2019.

Appearances and goals by club, season and competition
Club	Season	League			Cup		League Cup		Continental		Other		Total	
Club	Season	Division	Apps	Goals	Apps	Goals	Apps	Goals	Apps	Goals	Apps	Goals	Apps	Goals
Deportivo Español	2014	Primera B Metropolitana	0	0	0	0	—		—		0	0	0	0
Deportivo Español	2015	Primera B Metropolitana	0	0	0	0	—		—		0	0	0	0
Deportivo Español	2016	Primera B Metropolitana	1	0	0	0	—		—		0	0	1	0
Deportivo Español	2016–17	Primera B Metropolitana	10	0	0	0	—		—		1 (Note: Appearance(s) in the Primera B Metropolitana play-offs)	0	11	0
Deportivo Español	2017–18	Primera B Metropolitana	10	0	0	0	—		—		0	0	10	0
Deportivo Español	2018–19	Primera B Metropolitana	4	0	0	0	—		—		0	0	4	0
Career total			25	0	0	0	—		—		1	0	26	0
