= Luis Avilés (athlete) =

Mexican sprinter (born 2002)

Personal information
- Full name: Luis Antonio Avilés Ferreiro
- Born: 3 March 2002 (age 24) Cuautla, Morelos, Mexico

Sport
- Country: Mexico
- Sport: Athletics
- Events: 200 metres; 400 metres

Achievements and titles
- Personal bests: 200 m: 21.32 (2019); 400 m: 44.95 NU20R (2021)
Medal record
Men's athletics
Representing Mexico
Pan American Games
| Silver medal – second place | 2023 Santiago | 400 m |
| Silver medal – second place | 2023 Santiago | 4×400 m relay |
Youth Olympic Games
| Gold medal – first place | 2018 Buenos Aires | 400 m |
World U20 Championships
| Silver medal – second place | 2021 Nairobi | 400 m |
Junior Pan American Games
| Gold medal – first place | 2021 Cali-Valle | 400 m |
| Bronze medal – third place | 2021 Cali-Valle | 4×400 m relay |

Luis Antonio Avilés Ferreiro (Note: In this Spanish name, the first or paternal surname is Avilés and the second or maternal family name is Ferreiro.) (born 3 March 2002) is a Mexican sprinter specializing in the 400 m.

Avilés won a silver medal at the 2021 World Athletics U20 Championships and a gold medal at the 2021 Junior Pan American Games.

== Personal bests ==
| Event | Time | Venue | Date |
|---|---|---|---|
| 100m | 11.01 (+1.5) | Querétaro, Mexico | 28 April 2018 |
| 200m | 21.32 (+1.3) | Monterrey, Mexico | 17 February 2019 |
| 400m | 44.95 | Nairobi, Kenya | 21 August 2021 |
