= List of Mexican records in athletics =

The following are the national records in athletics in Mexico maintained by its national athletics federation: Federación Mexicana de Asociaciones de Atletismo (FMAA).

== Outdoor ==
Awaiting ratification Record not kept by FMAA Not ratified or later rescinded by FMAA

=== Men ===
Event	Record	Athlete	Date	Meet	Place	Ref.
100 m	10.21 (+0.1 m/s)	Carlos Villaseñor García	11 July 1997	National Championships	Toluca, Mexico	
100 m	10.21 (+0.8 m/s)	José Carlos Herrera	29 August 2014	National Championships	Xalapa, Mexico	
150 m (bend)	16.30 A NWI	Genaro Rodríguez	28 January 2017		Mexico City, Mexico	
200 m	20.17 (+0.9 m/s)	José Carlos Herrera	16 April 2016	Mt. SAC Relays	Norwalk, United States	
300 m	32.31	Alejandro Cárdenas	21 July 1974		Marietta, United States	
400 m	44.31	Alejandro Cárdenas	26 August 1999	World Championships	Seville, Spain	
600 m	1:15.23	Jesús Tonatiú López	5 April 2025	Miramar Invitational	Miramar, United States	
800 m	1:43.44	Jesús Tonatiú López	9 July 2021	American Track League	Atlanta, United States	
1500 m	3:35.03	Eduardo Herrera	12 July 2025	Sunset Tour	Los Angeles, United States	
Mile	3:51.95	Abraham Alvarado	7 August 2026	Sir Walter Miler	Raleigh, United States	
Mile (road)	3:58.89	Abraham Alvarado	19 September 2026	World Road Running Championships	Copenhagen, Denmark	
2000 m	5:01.7+	Eduardo Herrera	16 May 2026	Shanghai Diamond League	Keqiao, China	
3000 m	7:27.63	Eduardo Herrera	16 May 2026	Shanghai Diamond League	Keqiao, China	
Two miles	8:23.81	Juan Luis Barrios	10 June 2007	Prefontaine Classic	Eugene, United States	
5000 m	12:58.57	Eduardo Herrera	24 May 2025	Track Fest	Los Angeles, United States	
5 km (road)	13:18	Armando Quintanilla	31 March 1996	Carlsbad 5000	Carlsbad, United States	
10,000 m	27:08.23	Arturo Barrios	18 August 1989	ISTAF	Berlin, Germany	
10 km (road)	27:41	Arturo Barrios	1 March 1986	Continental Homes 10K	Phoenix, United States	
15 km (road)	42:36	Arturo Barrios	29 June 1986	Cascade Run Off	Portland, United States	
10 miles	46:44	Dionicio Cerón	2 April 1989		Washington, United States	
10 miles	46:44	Arturo Barrios	27 August 1994		Flint, United States	
20,000 m (track)	56:55.6	Arturo Barrios	30 March 1991		La Fleche, France	
20 km (road)	57:34+	Juan Luis Barrios	1 February 2015	Marugame Half Marathon	Marugame, Japan	
One hour	21101 m	Arturo Barrios	30 March 1991		La Fleche, France	
Half marathon	1:00:14 a	Armando Quintanilla	21 January 1996	Tokyo Half Marathon	Tokyo, Japan	
Half marathon	1:00:28	Germán Silva	24 September 1994	World Half Marathon Championships	Oslo, Norway	
25 km (road)	1:15:21+	Jorge Cruz	11 October 2026	Chicago Marathon	Chicago, United States	
25 km (road)	1:14:54+	Juan Luis Barrios	6 March 2011	Lala Marathon	Torreón, Mexico	
30 km (road)	1:30:19+	Juan Luis Barrios	6 March 2011	Lala Marathon	Torreón, Mexico	
30 km (road)	1:31:46+	Andrés Espinosa	28 September 2003	Berlin Marathon	Berlin, Germany	
Marathon	2:07:19 a	Andrés Espinosa	18 April 1994	Boston Marathon	Boston, United States	
Marathon	2:08:13	Jorge Cruz	11 October 2026	Chicago Marathon	Chicago, United States	
110 m hurdles	13.64 A (±0.0 m/s)	Genaro Rodríguez	31 March 2018	Encuentro Atlético FMA	Mexico City, Mexico	
400 m hurdles	49.27	Guillermo Campos	11 May 2024	Ibero-American Championships	Cuiabá, Brazil	
3000 m steeplechase	8:25.69	Salvador Miranda	8 July 2000	Encuentro Nacional de Fondo	Barakaldo, Spain	
High jump	2.31 m	Edgar Rivera	2 June 2021	P-T-S Meeting	Šamorín, Slovakia	
Pole vault	5.82 m	Giovanni Lanaro	15 April 2007	Mt. SAC Relays	Walnut, United States	
Long jump	8.46 m (+1.3 m/s)	Luis Rivera	12 July 2013	Universiade	Kazan, Russia	
Triple jump	16.99 m (+1.9 m/s)	Alberto Alvarez	16 April 2016	Mt. SAC Relays	Norwalk, United States	
Shot put	21.97 m	Uziel Muñoz	13 September 2025	World Championships	Tokyo, Japan	
Discus throw	63.35 m	Mario Cota	18 June 2016		Chula Vista, United States	
Hammer throw	78.68 m A	Diego del Real	24 April 2021	Pista del CARE	Monterrey, Mexico	
Javelin throw	81.45 m	David Carreón	17 May 2018	Elite Classic	Tucson, United States	
Javelin throw	82.68 m A	Juan de la Garza	7 June 1986		Mexico City, Mexico	
Decathlon	7614 pts h	Alejandro Cárdenas	10–11 May 1996	Ibero-American Championships	Medellín, Colombia	
Decathlon	100m (wind) / Long jump (wind) / Shot put / High jump / 400m / 110m H (wind) / Discus / Pole vault / Javelin / 1500m; 10.2 (+0.1 m/s) / 7.72 m (+1.3 m/s) / 12.55 m / 1.74 m / 46.33 / 15.73 (±0.0 m/s) / 38.32 m / 4.40 m / 57.28 m / 4:52.35					
5000 m walk (track)	18:35.36	Eder Sánchez	2 July 2014	Myting lekkoatletyczny AWF Katowice	Katowice, Poland	
5 km walk (road)	19:17	Eder Sánchez	8 December 2006	Gran Premio Internacional	Granada, Spain	
10,000 m walk (track)	38:26.4	Daniel García	17 May 1997		Sønder-Omme, Denmark	
10,000 m walk (track)	38:24.0	Bernardo Segura	7 May 1994		Fana, Norway	
10 km walk (road)	38:31	Eder Sánchez	19 September 2009	IAAF World Race Walking Challenge	Saransk, Russia	
20,000 m walk (track)	1:17:25.6	Bernardo Segura	7 May 1994		Bergen, Norway	
20 km walk (road)	1:17:56	Alejandro López	8 May 1999		Eisenhüttenstadt, Germany	
35 km walk (road)	2:24:41	José Luis Doctor	22 March 2025	Dudinska 50	Dudince, Slovakia	
Marathon walk	3:43:56	Lorenzo Dávila	25 October 2025	Lusatian Race Walking	Zittau, Germany	
50,000 m walk (track)	3:41:38.4	Raúl González	25 May 1979		Bergen, Norway	
50 km walk (road)	3:41:20	Raúl González	11 June 1978		Poděbrady, Czech Republic	
4 × 100 m relay	39.17	Mexico; Heber Gallegos; Iván Moreno; César Ramírez; Juan Carlos Alanís	28 August 2017	Universiade	Taipei, Taiwan	
4 × 400 m relay	3:02.23	Mexico; Pablo Cesar Vargas; Guillermo Campos; Valente Mendoza; Luis Avilés Ferreiro	7 August 2026	CAC Games	Santo Domingo, Dominican Republic	
4 × 800 m relay	7:20.92	Mexico; José Eduardo Rodríguez; Alexis Sotelo; Gamaliel Moctezuma; Jesús Tonatiu López	23 April 2017	IAAF World Relays	Nassau, Bahamas	
Distance medley relay	10:00.41	Mexico; Edgar Quiroz 3:03.66 (1200 m); Jose Fraire 48.15 (400 m); Bryan Martinez 1:55.13 (800 m); Christopher Sandoval 4:13.47 (1600 m)	26 April 2014	Penn Relays	Philadelphia, United States	
Marathon road relay (Ekiden)	2:03.48	Mexico; David Galindo (14:07); Víctor Rodríguez (30:15); Jesús Primo (14:55); Benjamín Paredes (29:35); Ruben García (14:24); Martín Rodríguez (20:32)	14 April 1996		Copenhagen, Denmark	

=== Women ===
Event	Record	Athlete	Date	Meet	Place	Ref.
100 m	11.09 A (+1.9 m/s)	Liliana Allen	19 June 1999	IMSS Grand Prix	Mexico City, Mexico	
150 m (bend)	18.63 A NWI	Ana Ramírez	28 January 2017		Mexico City, Mexico	
200 m	22.45 (+1.4 m/s)	Cecilia Tamayo-Garza	14 May 2023	American Athletic Conference Championships	Tampa, Florida	
300 m	35.30 A ^{[WB]}	Ana Guevara	3 May 2003	GP Banamex Meeting	Mexico City, Mexico	
400 m	48.89	Ana Guevara	27 August 2003	World Championships	Saint-Denis, France	
800 m	2:00.31	Valery Tobias	14 April 2023	Brian Clay Invitational	Azusa, United States	
1500 m	4:06.06	Alma Cortes	20 May 2022	Trials of Miles' Track Night	Manhattan, United States	
3000 m	8:28.05	Laura Galván	2 September 2023	Xiamen Diamond League	Xiamen, China	
Two miles	9:15.74	Laura Galván	27 May 2022	Prefontaine Classic	Eugene, United States	
5000 m	14:43.94	Laura Galván	23 August 2023	World Championships	Budapest, Hungary	
10,000 m	31:04.08	Laura Galván	4 March 2023	Sound Running THE TEN	San Juan Capistrano, United States	
5 km (road)	15:26 Wo	Laura Galván	19 April 2025	Boston 5K	Boston, United States	
5 km (road)	15:05 a	Laura Galván	2 April 2023	Carlsbad 5000	Carlsbad, United States	
10 km (road)	32:15	Marisol Romero Rosales	28 October 2012	Victoria 10 km	Ciudad Victoria, Mexico	
10 km (road)	31:56 a	Marisol Romero Rosales	3 August 2002	Peoples Beach to Beacon 10K	Cape Elizabeth, United States	
10 km (road)	31:55 X	Citlali Cristian Moscote	12 January 2025	10K Valencia Ibercaja	Valencia, Spain	
15 km (road)	50:00+	Madaí Pérez	22 October 2006	Chicago Marathon	Chicago, United States	
20 km (road)	1:04:06+ Mx	Laura Galván	11 January 2026	Aramco Houston Half Marathon	Houston, United States	
Half marathon	1:07:31 Mx	Laura Galván	11 January 2026	Aramco Houston Half Marathon	Houston, United States	
Half marathon	1:10:19 Wo	Úrsula Sánchez	17 October 2020	World Half Marathon Championships	Gdynia, Poland	
25 km (road)	1:23:26+	Madaí Pérez	22 October 2006	Chicago Marathon	Chicago, United States	
30 km (road)	1:45:05	Madaí Pérez	11 May 2008		Ixtapa, Mexico	
30 km (road)	1:40:12+	Madaí Pérez	22 October 2006	Chicago Marathon	Chicago, United States	
Marathon	2:22:59	Madaí Pérez	22 October 2006	Chicago Marathon	Chicago, United States	
100 km	8:33:43	Marina Valencia Hernández	14 October 2007	Mexican 100 km Championships	Monterrey, Mexico	
100 m hurdles	13.20 A	Sandra Tavares	19 May 1990		Mexico City, Mexico	
400 m hurdles	55.11	Zudikey Rodríguez	31 July 2018	CAC Games	Barranquilla, Colombia	
3000 m steeplechase	9:48.33	Ana Narvaez	14 May 2015		Eagle Rock, United States	
High jump	1.97 m	Romary Rifka	4 April 2004		Xalapa, Mexico	
Pole vault	4.35 m A	Carmelita Correa	18 March 2016	Selectivo Mt. SAC	Mexico City, Mexico	
Long jump	6.74 m A (−0.6 m/s)	Jessamyn Sauceda	7 May 2017		Mexico City, Mexico	
Triple jump	14.02 m A (+1.9 m/s)	Ivonne Rangel	29 April 2018	Copa Autonomía	Querétaro, Mexico	
Shot put	18.04 m	María Orozco	24 May 2018		Querétaro, Mexico	
Discus throw	56.09 m	Verónica Luzania	23 March 2024	Copa Portal	Mexicali, Mexico	
Hammer throw	66.52 m	Sharon Elizabeth Ayala González	16 May 2009		Logan, United States	
Javelin throw	59.26 m A	Abigail Gómez Hernandez	13 June 2015	Mexican Championships	Morelia, Mexico	
Heptathlon	5786 pts	Jessamyn Sauceda	24–25 July 2015	Pan American Games	Toronto, Canada	
Heptathlon	100m H (wind) / High jump / Shot put / 200m (wind) / Long jump (wind) / Javelin / 800m; 14.09 (-1.7) / 1.74m / 12.16m / 25.11 (+1.5) / 6.35 (+1.9) / 38.51m / 2:23.97					
10,000 m walk (track)	43:26:18	Graciela Mendoza	7 October 1989		Hull, Canada	
10 km walk (road)	42:42	Graciela Mendoza	25 May 1997		Naumburg, Germany	
15 km walk (road)	1:05:14+	María Guadalupe González	7 May 2016	World Race Walking Team Championships	Rome, Italy	
20,000 m walk (track)	1:33:26.74	Maria Guadalupe González	16 June 2017		Monterrey, Mexico	
20 km walk (road)	1:26:06	Alegna González	20 September 2025	World Championships	Tokyo, Japan	
Half marathon walk (road)	1:32:15	Alegna González	16 May 2026	33rd Grande Prémio Internacional de Rio Maior em Marcha	Rio Maior, Portugal	
35 km walk (road)	2:44:28	Alegna González	13 July 2025	Dublin Race Walking Summer Challenge	Dublin, Ireland	
50 km walk (road)	4:20:36	Erika Morales	21 October 2018		Hauppauge, United States	
4 × 100 m relay	44.79	Mexico; Natali Brito; Dania Aguillón; Paola Morán Errejón; Iza Daniela Flores	28 August 2017	Universiade	Taipei, Taiwan	
4 × 400 m relay	3:27.14	Mexico; Zudikey Rodriguez; Gabriela Medina; Nallely Vela; Ana Guevara	1 September 2007	World Championships	Osaka, Japan	
4 × 800 m relay	8:24.45	Mexico; Gabriela Medina; Cristina Guevara; Mariel Espinosa; Arantza Hernandez	25 May 2014	IAAF World Relays	Nassau, Bahamas	

== Indoor ==
=== Men ===
Event	Record	Athlete	Date	Meet	Place	Ref.
50 m	5.87 + A	Brandon Heredia	21 February 2025	NAU Tune Up	Flagstaff, United States	
55 m	6.46 A	Heber Gallegos	17 January 2014	Texas Tech Open	Lubbock, United States	
60 m	6.75	Heber Gallegos	15 February 2019	Texas Tech Matador Qualifier	Lubbock, United States	
60 m	6.75 A	Brandon Heredia	21 February 2025	NAU Tune Up	Flagstaff, United States	
200 m	20.81 A	José Carlos Herrera	24 January 2014	New Mexico Cherry and Silver Invitational	Albuquerque, United States	
200 m	20.81 A	José Carlos Herrera	15 February 2014	Don Kirby Collegiate Elite	Albuquerque, United States	
400 m	45.93	Alejandro Cárdenas	9 February 2000		Piraeus, Greece	
400 m	45.93	Alejandro Cárdenas	17 February 2000	GE Galan	Stockholm, Sweden	
800 m	1:47.19	Jesús Tonatiú López	25 February 2023	Tracksmith Twilight Indoor	New York City, United States	
1500 m	3:37.07+	Eduardo Herrera	22 February 2026	Saucony Battle for Boston	Boston, United States	
Mile	3:53.05	Eduardo Herrera	22 February 2026	Saucony Battle for Boston	Boston, United States	
Mile	3:52.58	Eduardo Herrera (Note: USA citizenship until 30 July 2023; eligible to represent MEX in National Representative Competitions from 31 July 2023)	26 February 2023	Last Chance Indoor Qualifier	Boston, United States	
3000 m	7:39.17	Eduardo Herrera	14 February 2025	BU David Hemery Valentine Invitational	Boston, United States	
5000 m	13:06.36	Eduardo Herrera	1 February 2025	BU John Thomas Terrier Classic	Boston, United States	
60 m hurdles	7.86	Guillermo Campos	14 February 2025	Howie Ryan Invitational	Houston, United States	
High jump	2.30 m	Edgar Rivera	9 February 2016	21st High Jump Meeting	Brno, Czech Republic	
High jump	2.30 m	Edgar Rivera	4 February 2017	High Jump Gala	Hustopeče, Czech Republic	
High jump	2.30 m	Erick Portillo	21 March 2026	World Championships	Toruń, Poland	
Pole vault	5.71 m A	Giovanni Lanaro	18 February 2006	Lumberjack Invitational	Flagstaff, United States	
Pole vault	5.71 m	Giovanni Lanaro	18 February 2009	GE Galan	Stockholm, Sweden	
Long jump	8.01 m	Luis Rivera	7 March 2014	World Championships	Sopot, Poland	
Triple jump	16.23 m	Francisco Javier Olivares	8 March 1985		Syracuse, United States	
Shot put	20.08 m	Stephen Saenz	9 March 2012	NCAA Division I Championships	Nampa, United States	
Weight throw	18.54 m	Stephen Saenz	3 February 2012	VT Elite Meet	Blacksburg, United States	
Heptathlon	4306 pts	Jorge Rivera	1–2 February 2008		Houston, United States	
Heptathlon	60m / Long jump / Shot put / High jump / 60m H / Pole vault / 1000m; 7.79 / 5.96 m / 10.42 m / 1.95 m / 9.63 / 3.45 m / 2:51.02					
Mile walk	5:24.50	Ever Palma	8 February 2025	USA 1 Mile Race Walking Championships	New York City, United States	
5000 m walk	18:38.71	Ernesto Canto	7 March 1987	World Championships	Indianapolis, United States	
4 × 400 m relay	3:11.41	Mexico; Alejandro Cárdenas; Juan Vallín; Alberto Araujo; Juan Pedro Toledo	8 March 1997	World Championships	Paris, France	

=== Women ===
Event	Record	Athlete	Date	Meet	Place	Ref.
50 m	6.11+	Liliana Allen	13 February 2000	Meeting Pas de Calais	Liévin, France	
60 m	7.08	Liliana Allen	13 February 2000	Meeting Pas de Calais	Liévin, France	
200 m	23.30	Cecilia Tamayo-Garza	11 February 2023	Tyson Invitational	Fayetteville, United States	
300 m	37.63	Paola Morán	12 February 2022	American Track League	Louisville, United States	
400 m	50.93	Ana Guevara	6 March 1999	World Championships	Maebashi, Japan	
800 m	2:06.6 y	Charlotte Bradley	12 January 1979		College Park, United States	
1500 m	4:08.96+	Lorena Rangel	15 February 2025	BU David Hemery Valentine Invitational	Boston, United States	
Mile	4:26.56	Lorena Rangel	15 February 2025	BU David Hemery Valentine Invitational	Boston, United States	
3000 m	8:40.45	Laura Galván	11 February 2023	Millrose Games	New York City, United States	
5000 m	16:13.26	Fatima Alanis	22 February 2024	ACC Indoor Track & Field Championships	Boston, United States	
60 m hurdles	8.43	Jacqueline Tavares	21 February 1999		Spała, Poland	
High jump	1.90 m A	Cristina Fink	25 February 1989		Flagstaff, United States	
High jump	1.90 m	Romary Rifka	8 March 2008	World Championships	Valencia, Spain	
Pole vault	4.41 m A (Note: outdoor mark ratified as absolute record)	Carmelita Correa	12 February 2016	NAU Invitational	Flagstaff, United States	
Long jump	6.37 m	Ivonne Treviño	15 January 2016		Houston, United States	
Triple jump	13.20 m A	Ivonne Rangel	2 February 2019	New Mexico Classic	Aubuquerque, United States	
Shot put	15.67 m	Naomi Moica	26 February 2021	Atlantic Sun Championships	Lynchburg, United States	
Pentathlon	4008 pts	Chrystal Ruiz Trevino	9 March 2012	NCAA Division II Championships	Mankato, United States	
Pentathlon	60m H / High jump / Shot put / Long jump / 800m; 8.63 / 1.73 m / 10.38 m / 5.72 m / 2:21.06					
3000 m walk	13:23.45	María Colín	6 March 1987	World Championships	Indianapolis, United States	
4 × 400 m relay						
