= Jessica O'Connell =

Canadian long-distance runner

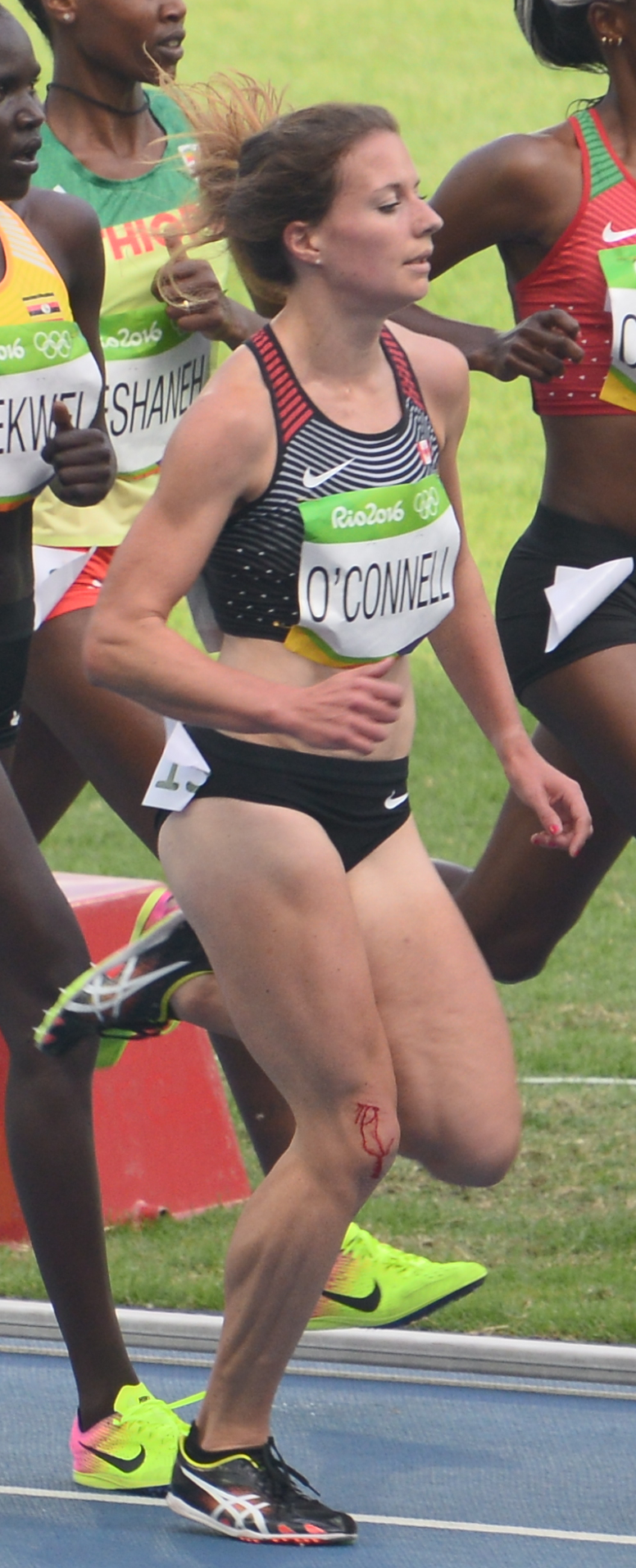
- O'Connell at the 2016 Summer Olympics

Personal information
- Born: 10 February 1989 (age 37) Calgary, Alberta
- Education: University of Calgary; West Virginia University
- Height: 158 cm (5 ft 2 in)
- Weight: 48 kg (106 lb)

Sport
- Sport: Track and field
- Event: 5000 m
- College team: West Virginia Mountaineers
Medal record
Representing Canada
Pan American Games
Silver medal – second place	2019 Lima	5000 m

Jessica O'Connell (born 10 February 1989) is a Canadian athlete competing primarily in long-distance events. She represented her country at the 2016 World Indoor Championships finishing ninth.

In July 2016, she was officially named to Canada's Olympic team in the 5000 meter event.

== Competition record ==
Year	Competition	Venue	Position	Event	Notes
Representing Canada
2007	Pan American Junior Championships	São Paulo, Brazil	4th	1500 m	4:27.84
2007	Pan American Junior Championships	São Paulo, Brazil	3rd	3000 m	9:56.33
2008	World Junior Championships	Bydgoszcz, Poland	16th (h)	1500 m	4:24.73
2010	NACAC U23 Championships	Miramar, United States	2nd	1500 m	4:25:78
2010	NACAC U23 Championships	Miramar, United States	1st	5000 m	17:15:73
2014	Commonwealth Games	Glasgow, United Kingdom	10th	5000 m	15:45.33
2014	Continental Cup	Marrakesh, Morocco	7th	3000 m	9:11.04^{1}
2015	Pan American Games	Toronto, Canada	7th	5000 m	16:08.41
2016	World Indoor Championships	Portland, United States	9th	3000 m	9:05.71
2016	Olympic Games	Rio de Janeiro, Brazil	26th (h)	5000 m	15:51.18
2017	World Championships	London, United Kingdom	25th (h)	5000 m	15:23.16
2017	Universiade	Taipei, Taiwan	2nd	5000 m	15:50.96
2019	Pan American Games	Lima, Peru	2nd	5000 m	15:36.08

^{1}Representing the Americas

== Personal bests ==
Outdoor

- 1500 metres – 4:10.61 (Burnaby BC 2019)
- One mile – 4:30.75 (Burnaby 2014)
- 3000 metres – 8:46.61 (Cork, Ireland 2018)
- 5000 metres – 15:06.44 (Palo Alto 2015)

Indoor

- 3000 metres – 8:46 50 (New York 2019) Canadian Record
