= Athletics at the 2019 Pan American Games – Women's 5000 metres =

Women's 5000 metres at the 2019 Pan American Games
- Venue: Athletics Stadium
- Dates: August 9
- Competitors: 11 from 7 nations
- Winning time: 15:35.47

Medalists
Gold medal	Laura Galván	Mexico
Silver medal	Jessica O'Connell	Canada
Bronze medal	Kimberley Conley	United States

The women's 5000 metres competition of the athletics events at the 2019 Pan American Games took place the 9 August at the 2019 Pan American Games Athletics Stadium. The defending Pan American Games champion was Juliana Paula dos Santos from Brazil.

== Records ==
Prior to this competition, the existing world and Pan American Games records were as follows:

World record	Tirunesh Dibaba (ETH)	14:11.15	Oslo, Norway	June 6, 2008
Pan American Games record	Adriana Fernandez (MEX)	15:30.65	Santo Domingo, Dominican Republic	August 6, 2003

== Schedule ==
Date	Time	Round
August 9, 2019	18:20	Final

== Results ==
All times shown are in seconds.

KEY:	q	Fastest non-qualifiers	Q	Qualified	NR	National record	PB	Personal best	SB	Seasonal best	DQ	Disqualified

=== Final ===
The results were as follows

Rank	Name	Nationality	Time	Notes
1st place, gold medalist(s)	Laura Galván	Mexico	15:35.47	
2nd place, silver medalist(s)	Jessica O'Connell	Canada	15:36.08	
3rd place, bronze medalist(s)	Kimberley Conley	United States	15:36.95	
4	Risper Biyaki	Mexico	15:42.47	PB
5	Carolina Tabares	Colombia	15:43.83	SB
6	Lauren Paquette	United States	15:45.93	
7	Luz Rojas Llanco	Peru	15:46.52	
8	Saida Meneses	Peru	15:46.91	PB
9	Florencia Borelli	Argentina	16:07.75	
10	Fedra Luna	Argentina	16:14.51	
11	Carmen Toaquiza	Ecuador	17:09.77	
