= Ednah Kurgat =

American middle- and long-distance runner (born 1991)

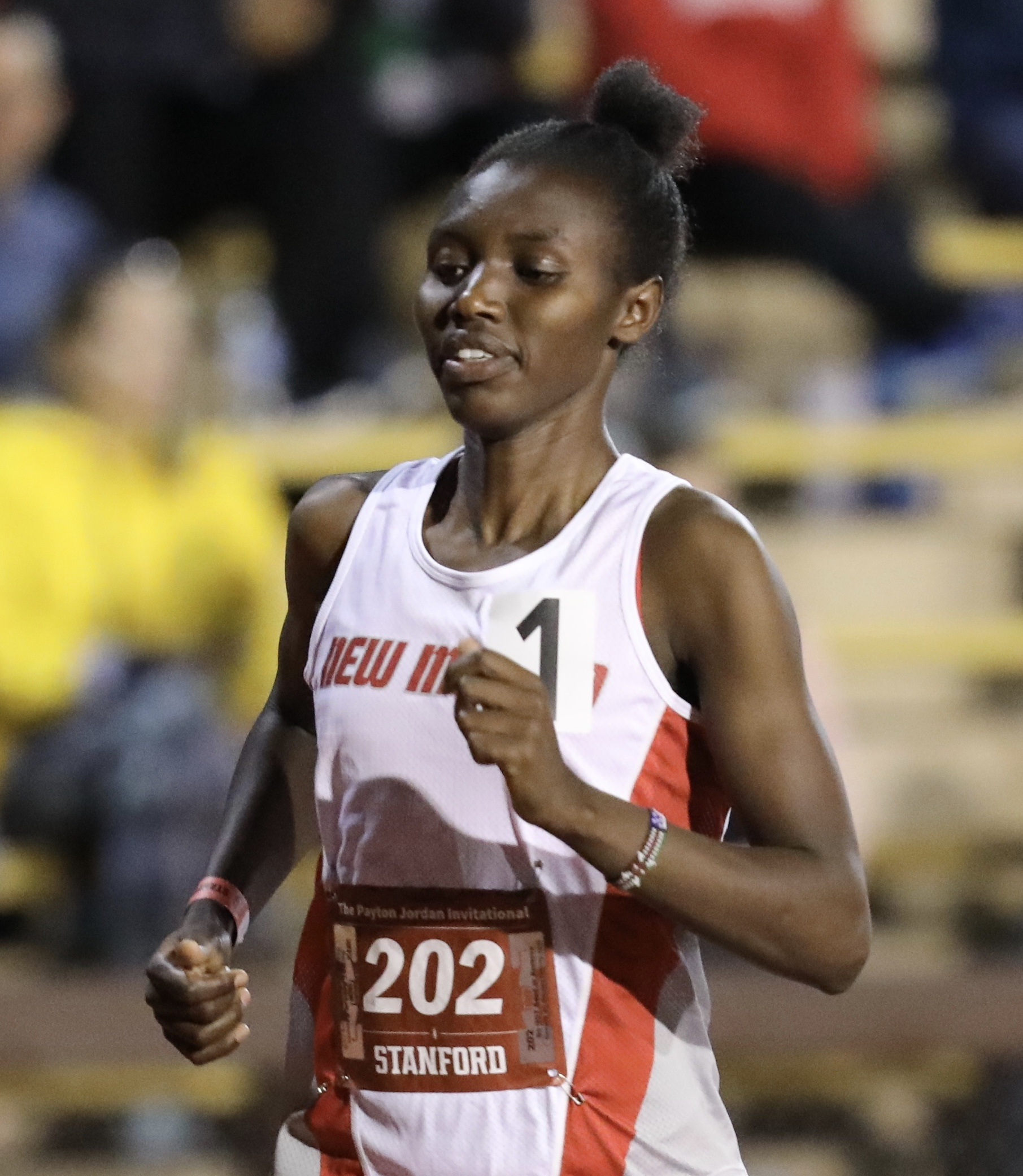
- Kurgat competes at the Payton Jordan Invitational in 2019

Personal information
- Born: June 15, 1991 (age 35) Eldoret, Kenya
- Height: 5 ft 7 in (1.70 m)
- Weight: 110 lb (50 kg)

Sport
- Country: United States
- Sport: Athletics
- Event(s): 1500 m, 5000 m, 10,000 m
- College team: Liberty University Lady Flames; New Mexico Lobos
- Turned pro: May 2020

Achievements and titles
- Personal bests: Outdoor; 1500 m: 4:18.61 (Azusa, 2019); 3000 m: 9:19.98 (Albuquerque, 2017); 5000 m: 15:11.30 (Walnut, 2023); 10000 m: 31:12.10 (London, 2023); Indoor; One Mile: 4:41.42 (Albuquerque, 2018); 3000 m: 9:03.81 (College Station, 2018); 5000 m: 15:14.78 (Boston, 2018); Road; 10 Kilometres: 32:04 (Northport, 2022); 10 Mile Road: 53:08 (Minneapolis, 2022); 20 Kilometres: 1:06:39 (New Haven, 2023)
Medal record
Women's athletics
Representing the United States
Pan American Games
Bronze medal – third place	2023 Santiago	10,000 m

Ednah Kurgat (born June 15, 1991) is a Kenyan-born American middle- and long-distance runner. She won the 2017 NCAA Division I Cross Country Championships while competing for the University of New Mexico. In October 2023, Kurgat won a bronze medal while representing the United States in the 10000 metres at the Pan American Games. She is a member of the U.S. Army World Class Athlete Program.

== Early life and emigration to the United States ==
Kurgat attended Biwott Ng'elel Tarit Secondary School in Eldoret, Kenya. Her decision to join the track team in the ninth grade was mainly driven by social factors rather than a serious interest in athletics. She developed an interest in the sport, however, as she realized that running could offer opportunities for studying abroad. In 2014, an assistant coach at Liberty University recruited Kurgat to run for the school in Lynchburg, Virginia. For Kurgat, who had never traveled outside of Africa, relocating to Lynchburg required an adjustment, including to the colder climate.

== Running career ==
=== College ===
Kurgat began competing for Liberty University in fall 2016. She finished 12th at the 2016 NCAA Division I Cross Country Championships and placed 4th in the 5000 m at the 2016 NCAA Division I Outdoor Track and Field Championships. After her freshman year, she transferred to the University of New Mexico in Albuquerque, drawn by the opportunity to join a more competitive team and the warmer climate, a contrast to Lynchburg, Virginia. Due to NCAA transfer rules, Liberty University did not grant Kurgat immediate athletic eligibility at her new university. She was required to take a year off from competition. This led to her having to redshirt the fall 2016 cross country season and the spring 2016 track season.

Kurgat resumed competition for the University of New Mexico in fall 2017. She won the 2017 NCAA Division I Cross Country Championships, held at E.P. "Tom" Sawyer State Park in Louisville, Kentucky. Her time of 19:19.5 was a course and meet record. Kurgat's victory also helped lead her team, the New Mexico Lobos, to a first-place finish. Following her victory, the U.S. Track & Field and Cross Country Coaches Association named Kurgat its National Athlete of the Year.

In the 2018 and 2019 NCAA Division I Cross Country Championships, Kurgat failed to replicate her win from 2017, but she recorded two finishes in the top ten, finishing 5th and 9th. Other notable results include Kurgat setting a personal best for of 15:14.78 for the indoor 5000 m indoors on December 1, 2018, narrowly missing the collegiate record of 15:12 and ranking her third in the women's indoor collegiate records.

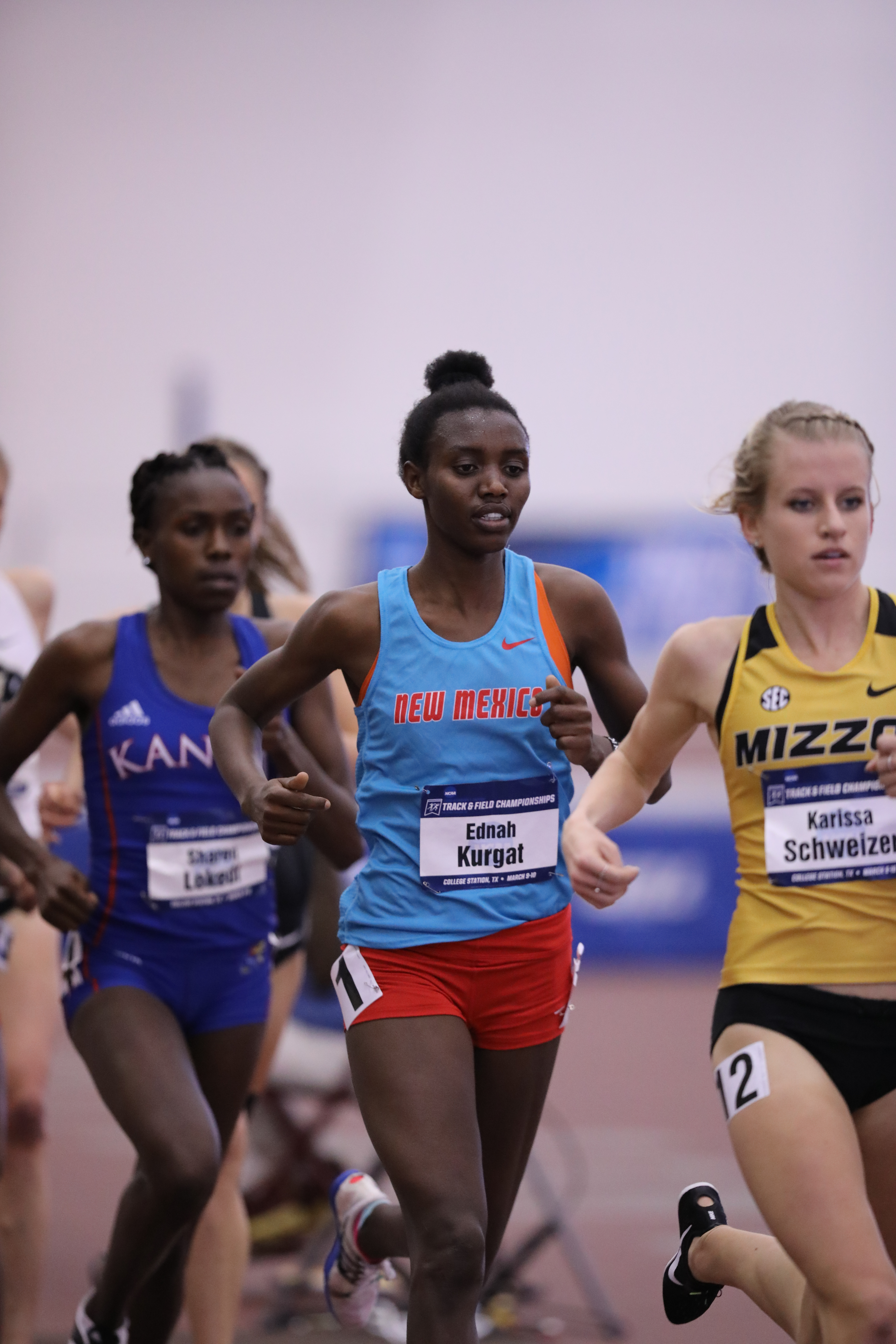
Kurgat competes at the 2018 NCAA Division I Indoor Track and Field Championships

=== Professional ===
==== 2020- 22 ====
After graduating from the University of New Mexico in May 2020, Kurgat enlisted in the United States Army. She now competes as a member of the track team in the U.S. Army World Class Athlete Program.

On 26 June 2021, Kurgat competed at the 2020 U.S. Olympic trials in Eugene, Oregon, aiming to qualify for the 2020 Summer Games which were postponed due to the COVID-19 pandemic. At these trials, Kurgat finished 11th with a time of 32:36.93. Other notable races contested by Kurgat include the USA 10 Mile Road Running Championships on 2 October 2022, where she finished 6th.

==== 2023 ====
In January, Kurgat won the 2023 USA Cross Country Championships in Richmond, Virginia, securing a place on the American national team. She then competed at the 44th World Athletics Cross Country Championships in Bathurst, Australia, on February 18, 2023. She finished 18th as the top American participant.

At the 2023 USA Outdoor Track and Field Championships, held in July, Kurgat participated in the 5000 m and 10000 m races, finishing 6th and 13th, respectively. In September, she competed in the US 20 km Road Running Championships, averaging 5:22 per mile and finishing in 2nd place behind Emily Sisson. On October 30, 2023, Kurgat represented the United States in the 10000 m at the Pan American Games in Santiago de Chile. She won her first international medal by finishing third in 33:16.61.

==== 2024-present ====
In March 2026, Kurat competed in the USA Half Marathon Championships held at the Atlanta Marathon. She was on track to finish in the top three, but a pace car led her and two other athletes off the course; she ended up finishing thirteenth.
