= Athletics at the 2023 Pan American Games – Women's 10,000 metres =

Women's 10,000 metres at the 2023 Pan American Games
- Venue: Julio Martínez National Stadium
- Dates: October 30
- Competitors: 9 from 6 nations
- Winning time: 33:12.99

Medalists
Gold medal	Luz Mery Rojas	Peru
Silver medal	Laura Galván	Mexico
Bronze medal	Ednah Kurgat	United States

The women's 10,000 metres competition of the athletics events at the 2023 Pan American Games was held on October 30 at the Julio Martínez National Stadium.

== Records ==
Prior to this competition, the existing world and Pan American Games records were as follows:

World record	Letensebet Gidei (ETH)	29:01.03	Hengelo, Netherlands	June 8, 2021
Pan American Games record	Natasha Wodak (CAN)	31:55.17	Lima, Peru	August 6, 2019

== Schedule ==
Date	Time	Round
October 30, 2023	19:40	Final

== Results ==
All times shown are in seconds.

KEY:	q	Fastest non-qualifiers	Q	Qualified	NR	National record	PB	Personal best	SB	Seasonal best	DQ	Disqualified

=== Final ===
The results were as follows:

Rank	Name	Nationality	Time	Notes
1st place, gold medalist(s)	Luz Mery Rojas	Peru	33:12.99	
2nd place, silver medalist(s)	Laura Galván	Mexico	33:15.85	
3rd place, bronze medalist(s)	Ednah Kurgat	United States	33:16.61	
4	Lizaida Valdivia	Peru	33:18.21	
5	Viviana Aroche	Independent Athletes Team	33:38.90	
6	Anisleidis Ochoa	Cuba	33:47.35	
7	Giselle Álvarez	Chile	34:01.07	
	Emily Venters	United States	DNS	
	Sofía Mamani	Peru	DNF	
