= Eduardo Herrera (runner) =

Mexican long-distance runner

Personal information
- Nationality: Mexican
- Born: 23 September 1997 (age 28)

Sport
- Sport: Athletics
- Event(s): Long distance running, Cross country running
- College team: Colorado Buffaloes

Achievements and titles
- Personal bests: Outdoor: 1500 m: 3:35.27 (2024) NR; Mile: 3:52.58 (2023); 3000 m: 7:27.63 (2026) NR; 5000 m: 12:58.57 (2025) NR; Indoor: 3000 m: 7:39.17 (2025); 5000 m: 13:06.36 (2025) NR

Eduardo Herrera (born 23 September 1997) is a Mexican middle- and long-distance runner. He is the national record holder over 5000 metres, both indoors and outdoors.

== Early life ==
He grew up in California and attended Madera South High School before attending the University of Colorado. He was a soccer player whilst living in Madera, California, and took up running as a way of maintaining fitness. He was runnerup at the 2015 CIF State Cross Country Championships and became the 2020 PAC-12 Conference cross country winner.

== Career ==
In April 2024, he finished third in the Boston 5k road race. In June 2024, he won the Mexican Athletics Championships over 1500 metres in a time of 13:43.73.

He set a new Mexican record in the 5000 meters indoors, running a time of 13:06:36 in the John Thomas Terrier Classic, held in Boston, Massachusetts on 1 February 2025.

In May 2025, he set a new personal best and national record for the 5000 metres, running 12:58.57 in Los Angeles. The time beat the previous national record of 13:07.79 set by Arturo Barrios. The time also met the minimum standard for the 2025 World Championships. He finished ninth over 5000 metres in Stockholm at the 2025 BAUHAUS-galan event, part of the 2025 Diamond League, in June 2025. In August, he placed third in 13:09.50 in the 5000m at the 2025 Athletissima event in Lausanne, in wet conditions.

In September 2025, he competed over 5000 metres at the 2025 World Championships in Tokyo, Japan, without advancing to the final.

Herrera was selected for the 2026 World Athletics Indoor Championships in Poland in March 2026, running the 1500 metres in 3:42.70 without advancing to the final.

In May 2026, Herrera set a Mexican record of 7:27.63 for the 3000 metres at the 2026 Shanghai Diamond League before placing fourth over 5000 metres at the 2026 Xiamen Diamond League.
