= Laura Galván =

Mexican long-distance runner

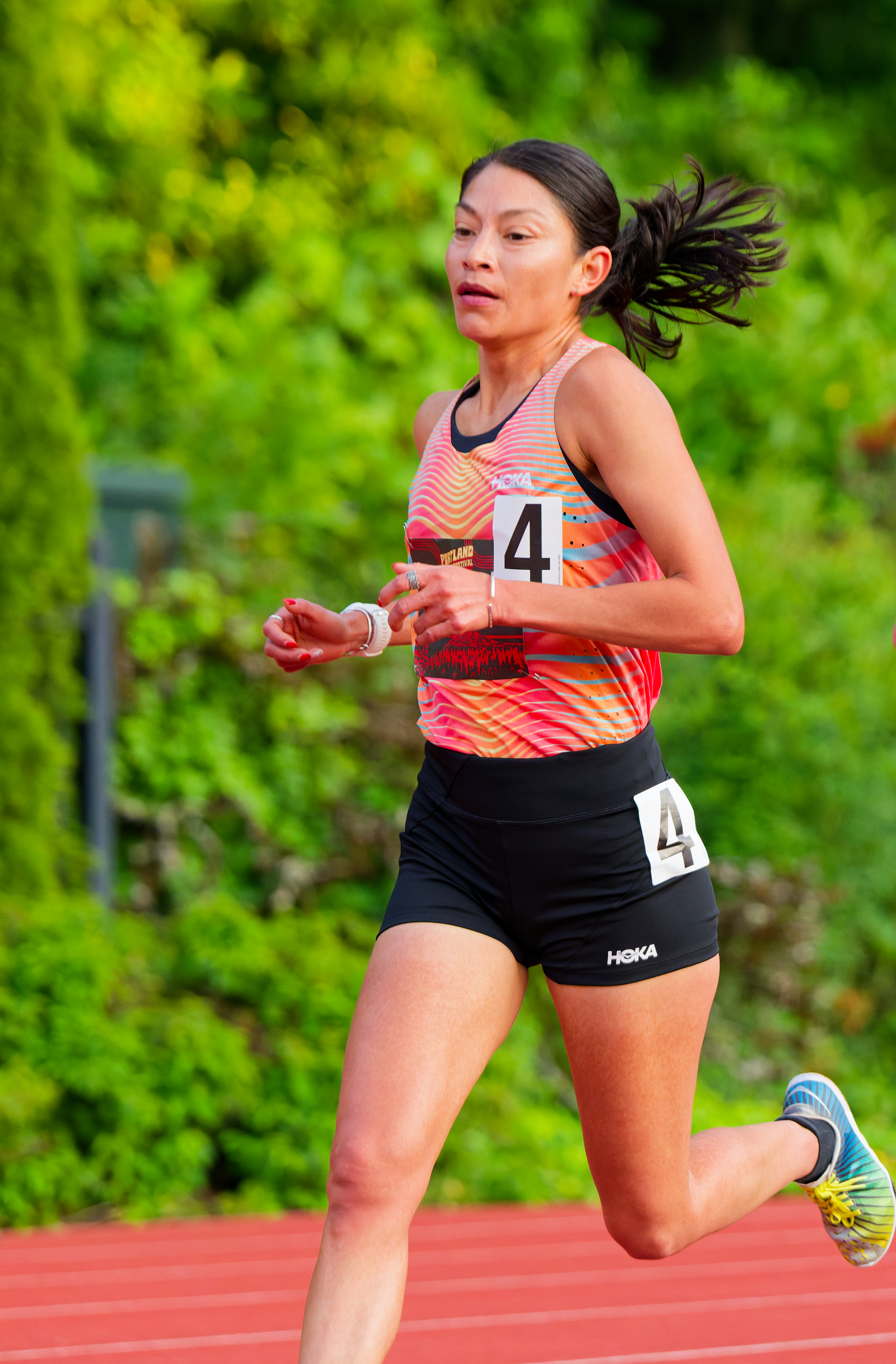
- Galván in 2025

Personal information
- Full name: Laura Esther Galván Rodríguez
- Born: 5 October 1991 (age 34) La Sauceda, Guanajuato, Mexico
- Height: 1.62 m (5 ft 4 in)

Sport
- Country: Mexico
- Sport: Long-distance running
Medal record
Women's athletics
Representing Mexico
Pan American Games
Gold medal – first place	2019 Lima	5000 m
Silver medal – second place	2023 Santiago	10,000 m

Laura Esther Galván Rodríguez (Note: In this Spanish name, the first or paternal surname is Galván and the second or maternal family name is Rodríguez.) (born 5 October 1991) is a Mexican long-distance runner. She won the gold medal in the women's 5000 metres event at the 2019 Pan American Games held in Lima, Peru. She also competed in the women's 1500 metres event where she finished in 4th place. On 6 March 2021, Galván ran 4:08.14 setting a new Mexican 1500 m record outdoor track and field.

== Personal bests ==
Surface	Event	Time	Date	Venue	Notes
Indoor track	One mile	4:31.89	January 24, 2020	Boston University	
Indoor track	3000m	8:40.45	February 11, 2023	The Armory	NR
Outdoor track	1500m	4:04.98	June 12, 2022	Sollentuna, Sweden	NR
Outdoor track	One mile	4:42.66	October 22, 2021	Tijuana, Mexico	
Outdoor track	3000m	8:28.05	September 2, 2023	Xiamen, China	NR
Outdoor track	5000m	14:51.15	June 16, 2022	Bislett Stadion	NR
Outdoor track	10000m	31:29.93	May 14, 2021	Irvine, CA	
Road	10k	33:30	November 14, 2021	Torreón, Mexico	
Road	Half Marathon	1:15:18	November 17, 2019	Monterrey, Mexico	

== See also ==
- List of Mexican records in athletics
