= Kim Conley =

American track and field athlete

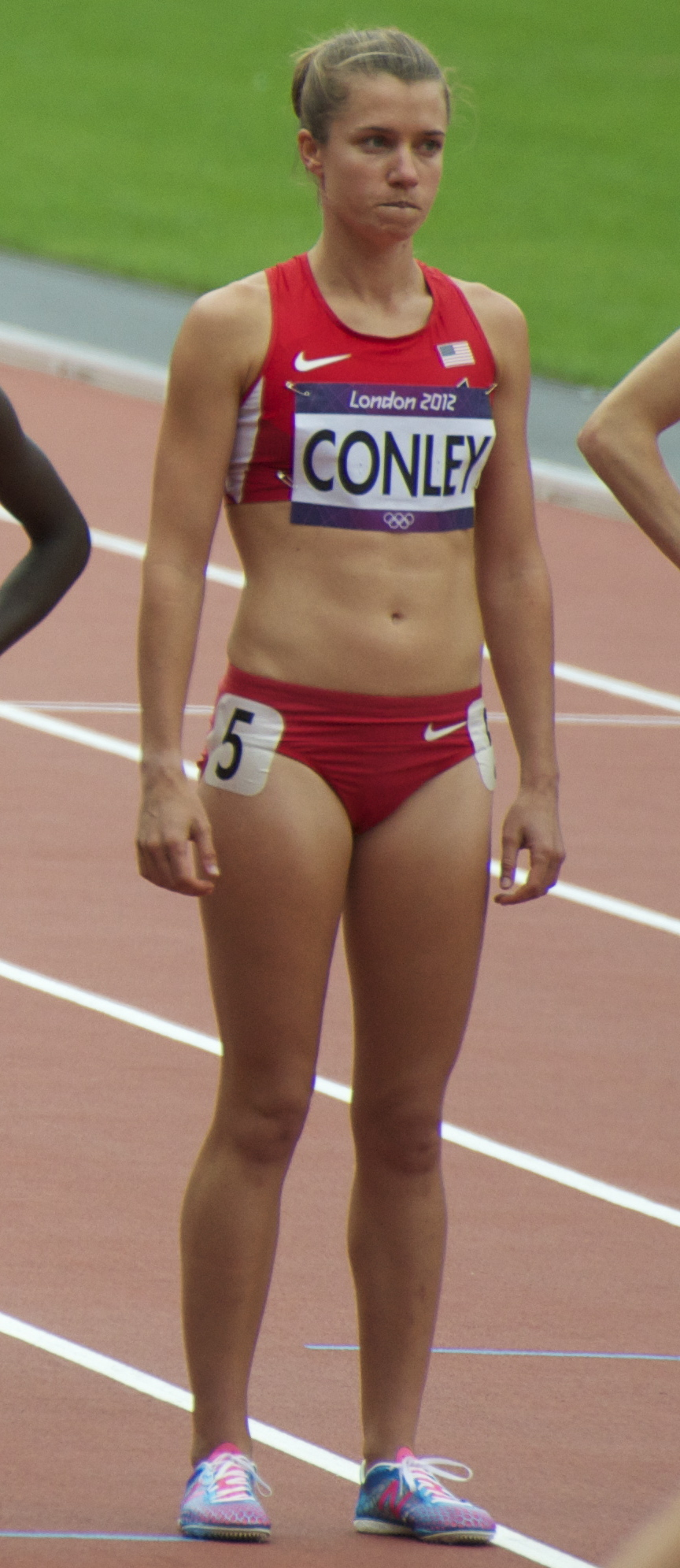
- Conley competing in the 5000 metres at the 2012 Olympics in London

Personal information
- Nationality: American
- Born: March 14, 1986 (age 40) Slough, United Kingdom

Sport
- Country: United States
- Sport: Track and field
- University team: UC Davis

Achievements and titles
- Olympic finals: 12th in heat (5000m, 2012); 12th in first round (5000m, 2016)
- World finals: 12th (5000m, 2013)
- National finals: Winner, 2014
Medal record
Representing United States
Pan American Games
Bronze medal – third place	2019 Lima	5000 m

Kim Conley (born March 14, 1986) is an American track and field athlete, who competes in middle and long distance track events. She finished in third place at the 2012 U.S. Olympic Trials to qualify for the 2012 Olympics in the 5,000 meters, where she finished twelfth in her heat.

She made her second U.S Olympic team in the 5,000m, where she finished 12th in the first round of competition.

== High school ==
Running for Montgomery High School in Santa Rosa, California, Her teammate Sara Bei won the CIF California State Meet title at 3,200 metres as a freshman. By her senior year, she managed to get to the State Meet, qualifying in both the 3,200 meters and the 1600 meters, but forgoing the longer race to try to make the final in the 1,600 meters. However, she was only the 19th best qualifier, well behind Anne St. Geme (daughter of American Junior 3,000 meters record holder Ceci Hopp).

== College ==
Conley ran track and cross country at UC Davis and was a volunteer assistant coach for the Aggies through 2014. She was the 2004 Division I Independent cross country champion in 17:07 as a freshman, then added her second All Division I Independent honor by placing seventh the following year as a sophomore.

In 2008, Conley helped make program history by becoming the first UC Davis Aggie to qualify for the NCAA Division I Outdoor Track and Field Championships. She earned All-West Region with her 12th-place showing at the regional, earning her the berth at the national meet. Conley earned all-conference or equivalent honors three times. Conley captured All Big West Conference accolades with a seventh-place showing. Conley was UC Davis' top runner in all 4 meets as a freshman, all 7 meets as a sophomore, all 5 meets as a junior, and every meet as a senior.

Conley's time of 16:17.51 set at the 2008 NCAA Track and Field West Regional in the 5,000 meters stands as a school record, and her mark of 4:22.17 in the 1,500 meters ranks her second on UC Davis' all-time list. Conley is ninth in the UC Davis outdoor 800 meters (2:10.73) and the UC Davis outdoor 3,000 meters (9:45.85) lists and owns the UC Davis indoor 3,000 meters record with a time of 9:19.16.

== 2012 USATF Olympic Trials ==
Conley qualified for the finals of the 5000 metres at the 2012 United States Olympic Trials, but did not have the 'A' standard time meaning that even if she won the trials she would not qualify for the 2012 Olympics. During the race Julia Lucas pushed the pace, but Lucas faded at the end of the race. Conley passed Lucas in the final meter, where she defeated Lucas by 4/100ths of a second and surpassed the 'A' standard by 21/100ths of a second.

== 2012 London Olympics ==
Conley ran 15:14.48 for the semifinals of the Athletics at the 2012 Summer Olympics – Women's 5000 metres.

== 2013 season ==
Conley finished fourth in the 5,000 metres at the 2013 USA Outdoor Track and Field Championships on June 23, 2013, in 15:37.80.

She qualified for the 2013 World Championships in Athletics, where she was fifth in her 5,000 metres heat on August 14 in 15:27.35 and twelfth in the final on August 17 in 15:36.58.

== 2014 US Outdoor Championships ==
After pushing the pace for the last 8 laps, Conley was passed in the last 200 meters by Jordan Hasay. But Conley came back and outsprinted Hasay in the last 100 meters to win the 10,000 meters title in 32:02.07 on June 26.

== 2014 Road Racing ==
Conley placed second in 1:15:41 on October 26, 2014, at the Healdsburg Wine Country Half Marathon.

== 2015 Road Racing ==
Conley won the 2015 USA Half Marathon Championship in Houston, Texas, on January 18, 2015.

== 2016 Rio Games ==
On December 6, 2015, Conley ran 31:58.54 at Hornet Stadium, Sacramento State University to meet the 2016 Olympic Standard.

She ran 15:09 at the UW Invite 5K for her 5000m olympic standard. On 27 May 2016, Kim ran 15:10.69 5000 m at Prefontaine Classic.

At the U.S. Olympic Trials, she ran 15:10.62, initially securing the 3rd spot for the 5,000m, but ended up with the second spot after Molly Huddle gave up her top spot to focus on the 10,000m.

In the 2016 Olympic Games, Conley finished 12th in the 1st round of the 5,000m in 15:34.39.

== 2017 US Outdoor Championship ==
Year	Competition	Venue	Position	Event	Notes
2017	2017 USA Outdoor Track and Field Championships	Sacramento, California	13th	5,000 m	15:36.82
2017	2017 USA Outdoor Track and Field Championships	Sacramento, California	DNF	10,000 m	DNF
