= Luz Mery Rojas =

Peruvian long-distance runner (born 1993)

Personal information
- Full name: Luz Mery Rojas Llanco
- Nationality: Peruvian
- Born: 20 June 1993 (age 33)
- Height: 160 cm (5 ft 3 in)
- Weight: 50 kg (110 lb)

Sport
- Country: Peru
- Sport: Athletics
- Event: Long-distance running

Achievements and titles
- World finals: 2023: 10,000 m
Medal record
Pan American Games
Gold medal – first place	2023 Santiago	10,000 m
South American Championships
Gold medal – first place	2023 São Paulo	10,000 m
Bronze medal – third place	2023 Lima	5000 m
Ibero-American Championships
Gold medal – first place	2018 Trujillo	5000 m
South American Games
Silver medal – second place	2018 Cochabamba	5000 m
Silver medal – second place	2026 Santa Fe	5000 m
Bronze medal – third place	2022 Asunciòn	10,000 m
Bronze medal – third place	2022 Asunciòn	10,000 m

Luz Mery Rojas Llanco (born 20 June 1993) is a Peruvian female long-distance runner who competes over distances from 5000 metres to the marathon.

She was the gold medallist in the 10,000 metres at the 2023 South American Championships in Athletics and went on to represent Peru at the 2023 World Athletics Championships in the 10,000 m. She also won a 5000 metres gold medal at the 2018 Ibero-American Championships in Athletics and ran for the host nation at the 2019 Pan American Games.

Rojas represented Peru at the World Athletics Half Marathon Championships in 2016 and 2018, and is a three-time medallist at the South American Games. She also competed for Peru at under-20 level at the 2011 IAAF World Cross Country Championships. Rojas has been Peruvian national champion over 5000 metres, 10,000 meters and the half marathon.

== Personal bests ==
- 3000 metres – 9:59.01 (2012)
- 5000 metres – 15:45.52 (2019)
- 10,000 metres – 33:07.74 (2023)
- 3000 metres steeplechase – 10:44.7 (2011)
- 10K run – 33:21 (2016)
- Half marathon – 1:10:32 (2023)
- Marathon – 2:36:20 (2022)

All details from World Athletics profile

== International competitions ==
Representing Peru
Year	Competition	Venue	Position	Event	Result	Notes
2010	South American Cross Country Championships	Guayaquil, Ecuador	2nd	Youth race	10:07.4	
2010	South American Cross Country Championships	Guayaquil, Ecuador	1st	Youth team	3 pts	
2010	South American Youth Championships	Santiago, Chile	2nd	2000 m s'chase	7:12.04	
2011	World Cross Country Championships	Punta Umbría, Spain	58th	Junior race	21:56	
2011	World Cross Country Championships	Punta Umbría, Spain	11th	Junior team	218 pts	
2011	South American Junior Championships	Medellín, Colombia	2nd	5000 m	17:16.70	
2011	South American Junior Championships	Medellín, Colombia	1st	3000 m s'chase	10:53.59	
2011	Pan American Junior Championships	Miramar, United States	3rd	5000 m	17:00.10	
2012	South American Cross Country Championships	Lima, Peru	1st	Junior race	22:54.7	
2012	South American Cross Country Championships	Lima, Peru	1st	Junior team	8 pts	
2014	South American U23 Championships	Montevideo, Uruguay	2nd	10,000 m	35:32.56	
2016	World Half Marathon Championships	Cardiff, United Kingdom	60th	Half marathon	1:16:13	
2016	World Half Marathon Championships	Cardiff, United Kingdom	10th	Team	3:39:46	
2016	Pan American Cross Country Cup	Caraballeda, Venezuela	3rd	Senior race	38:04	
2016	Pan American Cross Country Cup	Caraballeda, Venezuela	1st	Team	17 pts	
2017	South American Championships	Luque, Paraguay	4th	5000 m	16:35.20	
2017	Bolivarian Games	Santa Marta, Colombia	2nd	10,000 m	33:59.58	
2018	World Half Marathon Championships	Valencia, Spain	34th	Half marathon	1:12:05	
2018	World Half Marathon Championships	Valencia, Spain	8th	Team	3:35:52	
2018	Pan American Cross Country Cup	Opico, El Salvador	3rd	Senior race	35:07	
2018	Pan American Cross Country Cup	Opico, El Salvador	1st	Team	28 pts	
2018	South American Games	Cochabamba, Bolivia	2nd	5000 m	17:09.59	
2018	Ibero-American Championships	Trujillo, Peru	1st	5000 m	16:08.77	
2019	South American Championships	Lima, Peru	3rd	5000 m	15:46.27	
2019	Pan American Games	Lima, Peru	7th	5000 m	15:46.52	
2022	Bolivarian Games	Valledupar, Colombia	2nd	Half marathon	1:15:22.94	
2022	South American Games	Asunción, Paraguay	3rd	5000 m	15:49.85	
2022	South American Games	Asunción, Paraguay	3rd	10,000 m	33:50.44	
2023	South American Championships	São Paulo, Brazil	1st	10,000 m	34:25.0	
2023	World Championships	Budapest, Hungary	19th	10,000 m	33:19.61	
2023	Pan American Games	Santiago, Chile	1st	10,000 m	33:12.99	
2026	South American Games	Santa Fe, Argentina	2nd	10,000 m	32:32.00	

== National titles ==
- Peruvian Athletics Championships
  - 5000 m: 2017, 2018, 2023
  - 10,000 m: 2016, 2023
  - Half marathon: 2022
- Peruvian Under-23 Championships
  - 10,000 m: 2014

== See also ==
- Peru at the 2023 World Athletics Championships
