= 2025 South American Championships in Athletics – Results =

These are the results of the 2025 South American Championships in Athletics which took place at the Estadio Justo Ernesto Román in Mar del Plata, Argentina, from 25 to 27 April.

== Men's results ==
=== 100 metres ===
Heats – 25 April
Wind:
Heat 1: +0.3 m/s, Heat 2: +1.3 m/s, Heat 3: +0.9 m/s

Rank	Heat	Name	Nationality	Time	Notes
1	1	Ronal Longa	Colombia	10.04	Q, SB
2	1	Felipe Bardi	Brazil	10.16	Q, =SB
3	2	Arturo Deliser	Panama	10.17	Q, PB
4	3	Carlos Flórez	Colombia	10.21	Q
5	2	Franco Florio	Argentina	10.29	Q, SB
6	3	Tomás Villegas	Argentina	10.30	Q
7	2	Erik Cardoso	Brazil	10.33	q
8	2	Gustavo Mongelós	Paraguay	10.36	q, PB
9	1	Alexis Nieves	Venezuela	10.40	
10	2	Bryant Alamo	Venezuela	10.42	
11	1	Akeem Stewart	Guyana	10.48	SB
12	3	Tomás Vial	Chile	10.49	
13	1	Santiago Lazar	Uruguay	10.54	NU18R
14	2	Aron Earl	Peru	10.56	SB
14	3	Jonathan Wolk	Paraguay	10.56	SB
16	3	Roy Chila	Ecuador	10.63	
17	1	Enzo Faulbaum	Chile	10.65	
18	2	Adrián Nicolari	Uruguay	10.74	SB
19	1	Luis Humberto Angulo	Peru	10.76	
20	3	Keiron DeSouza	Guyana	10.86	SB

Final – 25 April
Wind:
+0.4 m/s

Rank	Lane	Name	Nationality	Time	Notes
1st place, gold medalist(s)	4	Felipe Bardi	Brazil	9.99	SB
2nd place, silver medalist(s)	3	Ronal Longa	Colombia	10.04	=SB
3rd place, bronze medalist(s)	6	Carlos Flórez	Colombia	10.17	
4	5	Arturo Deliser	Panama	10.20	
5	8	Erik Cardoso	Brazil	10.31	
6	2	Franco Florio	Argentina	10.34	
7	7	Tomás Villegas	Argentina	10.39	
8	1	Gustavo Mongelós	Paraguay	10.54	

=== 200 metres ===
Heats – 27 April
Wind:
Heat 1: +2.6 m/s, Heat 2: +1.6 m/s

Rank	Heat	Name	Nationality	Time	Notes
1	1	Ronal Longa	Colombia	20.72	Q
2	1	César Almirón	Paraguay	20.73	Q
3	2	Renan Gallina	Brazil	20.82	Q, SB
4	2	Neiker Abello	Colombia	20.83	Q
5	2	Juan Ignacio Ciampitti	Argentina	20.83	Q
6	1	Arturo Deliser	Panama	20.89	Q
7	2	Shamar Horatio	Guyana	20.99	q
8	1	Tomás Mondino	Argentina	21.18	q
9	1	Gabriel dos Santos	Brazil	21.31	
10	1	Juan Pedro Álvarez	Uruguay	21.34	
11	2	Enzo Faulbaum	Chile	21.49	
12	2	Gustavo Mongelós	Paraguay	21.71	=PB
13	2	Rodrigo Cornejo	Peru	21.82	PB
14	1	Mariano Fiol	Peru	21.88	
15	2	Álvaro Piñeyro	Uruguay	22.25	PB
16	1	Noelex Holder	Guyana	22.28	

Final – 27 April
Wind:
+1.6 m/s

Rank	Lane	Name	Nationality	Time	Notes
1st place, gold medalist(s)	6	César Almirón	Paraguay	20.50	SB
2nd place, silver medalist(s)	5	Ronal Longa	Colombia	20.56	PB
3rd place, bronze medalist(s)	8	Arturo Deliser	Panama	20.67	SB
4	3	Juan Ignacio Ciampitti	Argentina	20.77	
5	4	Neiker Abello	Colombia	20.91	
6	2	Shamar Horatio	Guyana	20.92	SB
7	7	Renan Gallina	Brazil	21.03	
8	1	Tomás Mondino	Argentina	21.24	

=== 400 metres ===
Heats – 25 April

Rank	Heat	Name	Nationality	Time	Notes
1	2	Kelvis Padrino	Venezuela	45.87	Q, SB
2	1	Elián Larregina	Argentina	46.27	Q, SB
3	1	Javier Gómez	Venezuela	46.51	Q
4	2	Lucas Carvalho	Brazil	46.86	Q
5	2	Agustín Pinti	Argentina	46.93	Q, PB
6	2	Jeffrey Cajo	Peru	47.05	q, PB
7	1	Daniel Balanta	Colombia	47.16	Q
8	1	Francisco Guerrero	Ecuador	47.30	q
9	2	Luis Arrieta	Colombia	48.05	
10	2	Lenin Sánchez	Ecuador	48.07	
11	2	Jhumiler Sánchez	Paraguay	48.23	
12	1	Paul Wood	Paraguay	49.11	
13	1	Douglas da Silva	Brazil	49.32	
14	1	Fabricio Da Rosa	Uruguay	51.36	

Final – 26 April

Rank	Lane	Name	Nationality	Time	Notes
1st place, gold medalist(s)	4	Kelvis Padrino	Venezuela	46.02	
2nd place, silver medalist(s)	5	Elián Larregina	Argentina	46.17	SB
3rd place, bronze medalist(s)	6	Javier Gómez	Venezuela	46.73	
4	7	Lucas Carvalho	Brazil	47.11	
5	3	Agustín Pinti	Argentina	47.22	
6	1	Jeffrey Cajo	Peru	47.62	
7	8	Daniel Balanta	Colombia	48.32	
	2	Francisco Guerrero	Ecuador	DNS	

=== 800 metres ===
Heats – 26 April

Rank	Heat	Name	Nationality	Time	Notes
1	1	Eduardo Moreira	Brazil	1:49.84	Q
2	1	Rafael Muñoz	Chile	1:49.96	Q
3	1	José Antonio Maita	Venezuela	1:50.04	Q
4	1	Marco Vilca	Peru	1:50.11	q
5	2	Franco Peidon	Argentina	1:50.29	Q
6	2	Klaus Scholz	Chile	1:50.61	Q
7	2	Ryan López	Venezuela	1:50.63	Q
8	2	Guilherme Orenhas	Brazil	1:50.97	q
9	1	Matías González	Uruguay	1:51.33	
10	2	Juan Mena	Colombia	1:51.61	
11	1	Ramiro Ulunque	Bolivia	1:52.36	
12	2	Jairo Moreira	Uruguay	1:52.71	
13	1	Julián Gaviola	Argentina	1:54.39	
14	2	Christian Acosta	Paraguay	1:58.11	=PB
15	1	Giuliano Ruffinelli	Paraguay	1:59.62	

Final – 27 April

Rank	Name	Nationality	Time	Notes
1st place, gold medalist(s)	Eduardo Moreira	Brazil	1:50.46	
2nd place, silver medalist(s)	José Antonio Maita	Venezuela	1:50.93	1:50.922
3rd place, bronze medalist(s)	Marco Vilca	Peru	1:50.93	1:50.924
4	Rafael Muñoz	Chile	1:51.23	
5	Franco Peidon	Argentina	1:51.53	
6	Ryan López	Venezuela	1:51.87	
7	Guilherme Orenhas	Brazil	1:52.51	
8	Klaus Scholz	Chile	1:53.59	

=== 1500 metres ===
25 April

Rank	Name	Nationality	Time	Notes
	Camden Gilmore*	Paraguay	3:41.14	SB
1st place, gold medalist(s)	Diego Lacamoire	Argentina	3:41.34	SB
2nd place, silver medalist(s)	Guilherme Kurtz	Brazil	3:42.79	
3rd place, bronze medalist(s)	Thiago André	Brazil	3:44.77	
4	Fernando Chaves	Argentina	3:45.68	
5	Diego Uribe	Chile	3:46.41	SB
6	Pedro Marín	Colombia	3:47.87	
7	Adrian König-Rannenberg	Peru	3:48.19	
8	Yeferson Cuno	Peru	3:48.22	
9	Gonzalo Gervasini	Uruguay	3:50.87	
10	Sebastián López	Venezuela	3:53.33	
11	Lucas Jiménez	Ecuador	3:53.66	
12	Ericky Dos Santos	Paraguay	3:59.38	
13	Marcos Ramírez	Paraguay	4:00.29	
14	David Ninavia	Bolivia	4:01.83	SB

=== 5000 metres ===
27 April

Rank	Name	Nationality	Time	Notes
1st place, gold medalist(s)	Carlos San Martín	Colombia	13:54.34	
2nd place, silver medalist(s)	Janio Gonçalves	Brazil	13:55.88	PB
3rd place, bronze medalist(s)	Ignacio Velázquez	Chile	13:59.81	SB
4	Jhonatan Molina	Peru	14:01.26	PB
5	Luis Masabanda	Ecuador	14:08.53	PB
6	Diddier Rodríguez	Panama	14:09.08	NR
7	Walter Niña	Peru	14:10.21	
8	Fabián Manrique	Argentina	14:12.92	SB
9	Joaquín Campos	Chile	14:13.49	
10	Ericky Dos Santos	Paraguay	14:18.05	PB
11	Fernando Chaves	Argentina	14:19.47	PB
12	Fabio Correia	Brazil	14:31.42	
13	Lucas Jiménez	Ecuador	14:55.46	
14	Gaspar Geymonat	Uruguay	14:56.23	
	Marcos Ramírez	Paraguay	DNF	
	Gonzalo Gervasini	Uruguay	DNF	
	David Ninavia	Bolivia	DNS	
	Pedro Marín	Colombia	DNS	

=== 10,000 metres ===
25 April

Rank	Name	Nationality	Time	Notes
1st place, gold medalist(s)	Ignacio Velázquez	Chile	28:44.81	
2nd place, silver medalist(s)	Nider Pecho	Peru	28:49.48	PB
3rd place, bronze medalist(s)	Luis Masabanda	Ecuador	29:03.88	PB
4	Matías Reynagas	Argentina	29:04.12	SB
5	Fabio Correia	Brazil	29:28.12	PB
6	Martín Cuestas	Uruguay	30:30.41	SB
7	Bruno Rodríguez	Uruguay	30:35.49	PB
8	Victor Neiva	Brazil	32:21.68	
9	Alan Niestroj	Argentina	32:22.04	
10	David Mejía	Colombia	34:10.63	
	Frank Lujan	Peru	DNF	

=== 110 metres hurdles ===
Heats – 27 April
Wind:
Heat 1: +2.1 m/s, Heat 2: +2.3 m/s

Rank	Heat	Name	Nationality	Time	Notes
1	2	Thiago Ornelas	Brazil	13.66	Q
2	1	Eduardo de Deus	Brazil	13.70	Q
3	1	Marcos Herrera	Ecuador	13.79	Q
4	1	Martín Sáenz	Chile	13.81	Q
5	1	Renzo Cremaschi	Argentina	14.21	q
6	1	Gerson Izaguirre	Venezuela	14.35	q
7	1	Kevin Mendieta	Paraguay	14.45	
8	2	Diego Lyon	Chile	14.53	Q
9	2	Fabrizio Jara	Paraguay	14.98	Q
10	2	Nahuel Laguna	Uruguay	15.29	
	2	Francisco Ferreccio	Argentina	DNF	

Final – 27 April
Wind:
+1.0 m/s

Rank	Lane	Name	Nationality	Time	Notes
1st place, gold medalist(s)	7	Martín Sáenz	Chile	13.51	SB
2nd place, silver medalist(s)	4	Thiago Ornelas	Brazil	13.63	
3rd place, bronze medalist(s)	3	Marcos Herrera	Ecuador	13.77	SB
4	5	Eduardo de Deus	Brazil	13.99	
5	1	Gerson Izaguirre	Venezuela	14.41	SB
6	8	Renzo Cremaschi	Argentina	14.43	
7	6	Diego Lyon	Chile	14.68	
8	2	Fabrizio Jara	Paraguay	14.78	SB

=== 400 metres hurdles ===
Heats – 25 April

Rank	Heat	Name	Nationality	Time	Notes
1	1	Francisco Guilherme dos Reis Viana	Brazil	49.75	Q
2	1	Diego Courbis	Chile	50.96	Q
3	1	Bruno De Genaro	Argentina	51.01	Q, SB
4	2	Caio Vinícius Silva	Brazil	51.69	Q
5	1	Ian Andrey Pata	Ecuador	52.34	q, SB
6	2	Ramón Fuenzalida	Chile	53.41	Q
7	2	Julian Pereyra	Argentina	53.71	Q
8	1	Franco Fumero	Uruguay	54.88	q, PB
9	2	Luis Eléspuru	Peru	55.44	
10	2	Ivań Britez	Paraguay	56.94	
11	2	Santiago Clark	Uruguay	57.02	
12	1	Osvaldo Méndez	Paraguay	57.66	SB

Final – 26 April

Rank	Lane	Name	Nationality	Time	Notes
1st place, gold medalist(s)	4	Francisco Guilherme dos Reis Viana	Brazil	50.03	
2nd place, silver medalist(s)	5	Caio Vinícius Silva	Brazil	51.27	
3rd place, bronze medalist(s)	7	Diego Courbis	Chile	51.40	
4	8	Bruno De Genaro	Argentina	51.42	
5	6	Ramón Fuenzalida	Chile	51.62	
6	1	Ian Andrey Pata	Ecuador	53.47	
7	3	Julian Pereyra	Argentina	54.05	
8	2	Franco Fumero	Uruguay	55.38	

=== 3000 metres steeplechase ===
26 April

Rank	Name	Nationality	Time	Notes
1st place, gold medalist(s)	Carlos San Martín	Colombia	8:37.79	SB
2nd place, silver medalist(s)	Diddier Rodríguez	Panama	8:41.31	SB
3rd place, bronze medalist(s)	Walace Caldas	Brazil	8:46.17	
4	Yeferson Cuno	Peru	8:49.28	PB
5	Carlos Johnson	Argentina	9:03.66	
6	Víctor Aguilar	Bolivia	9:09.52	
7	Hipolito Pereiro	Argentina	9:20.96	
8	Pascual Acevedo	Uruguay	9:22.13	PB
9	Kevin Genes	Uruguay	9:55.41	

=== 4 × 100 metres relay ===
Heats – 26 April

Rank	Heat	Nation	Competitors	Time	Notes
1	1	Colombia	Neiker Abello, Carlos Palacios, Pedro Agualimpia, Carlos Flórez	39.73	Q
2	1	Argentina	Daniel Londero, Franco Florio, Juan Ignacio Ciampitti, Tomás Villegas	39.91	Q
3	2	Venezuela	Ángel Alvarado, Bryant Alamo, Alexis Nieves, David Vivas	39.95	Q
4	2	Brazil	Rodrigo do Nascimento, Felipe Bardi, Erik Cardoso, Hygor Gabriel Soares	40.00	Q
5	2	Paraguay	Jonathan Wolk, Misael Zalazar, Fredy Maidana, Gustavo Mongelós	40.36	Q
6	2	Chile	Enrique Polanco, Enzo Faulbaum, Tomás Vial, Mauricio Martínez	41.36	q
7	1	Guyana	Emanuel Archibald, Noelex Holder, Shamar Horatio, Akeem Stewart	41.68	Q
	1	Uruguay	Álvaro Piñeyro, Santiago Lazar, Adrián Nicolari, Juan Pedro Álvarez	DNF	
	1	Peru	Rodrigo Cornejo, Mariano Fiol, Luis Humberto Angulo, Jeffrey Cajo	DNF	

Final – 27 April

Rank	Lane	Nation	Competitors	Time	Notes
1st place, gold medalist(s)	5	Colombia	Jhonny Rentería, Carlos Palacios, Neiker Abello, Carlos Flórez	39.58	
2nd place, silver medalist(s)	6	Brazil	Vinícius Moraes, Felipe Bardi, Erik Cardoso, Vitor Hugo dos Santos	39.62	
3rd place, bronze medalist(s)	7	Venezuela	Ángel Alvarado, Bryant Alamo, Alexis Nieves, David Vivas	39.84	
4	4	Argentina	Daniel Londero, Franco Florio, Juan Ignacio Ciampitti, Tomás Villegas	39.91	
5	8	Paraguay	Jonathan Wolk, Misael Zalazar, Fredy Maidana, César Almirón	40.01	
6	2	Chile	Enrique Polanco, Enzo Faulbaum, Tomás Vial, Mauricio Martínez	41.21	
	3	Guyana	Keiron DeSouza, Emanuel Archibald, Akeem Stewart, Shamar Horatio	DNF	

=== 4 × 400 metres relay ===
27 April

Rank	Lane	Nation	Competitors	Time	Notes
1st place, gold medalist(s)	8	Brazil	Tiago da Silva, Lucas Carvalho, Jadson Soares, Elias Oliveira	3:07.40	
2nd place, silver medalist(s)	2	Argentina	Agustín Pinti, Tomás Mirón, Bruno de Genaro, Elián Larregina	3:08.77	
3rd place, bronze medalist(s)	1	Venezuela	Javier Gómez, Axel Gómez, Kalin Zambrano, Kelvis Padrino	3:09.18	
4	7	Chile	Martín Zabala, Francisco Muñoz, Ramón Fuenzalida, Diego Courbis	3:13.04	
5	5	Ecuador	Alan Minda, Lenin Sánchez, Jholeixon Rodríguez, Ian Andrey Pata	3:14.22	
6	4	Peru	Rodrigo Cornejo, Jeffrey Cajo, Luis Eléspuru, Marco Vilca	3:14.26	
7	6	Paraguay	Giuliano Ruffinelli, Paul Wood, Christian Acosta, Jhumiler Sánchez	3:22.82	
8	3	Uruguay	Manuel Fernández, Jairo Moreira, Fabricio Da Rosa, Matías González	3:23.87	

=== 20 kilometres walk ===
26 April

Rank	Name	Nationality	Time	Notes
1st place, gold medalist(s)	Luis Henry Campos	Peru	1:21:26	CR, SB
2nd place, silver medalist(s)	Jordy Jiménez	Ecuador	1:24:06	
3rd place, bronze medalist(s)	Matheus Corrêa	Brazil	1:25:17	SB
4	Yassir Cabrera	Panama	1:26:16	SB
5	Juan Manuel Cano	Argentina	1:29:18	SB
	David Hurtado	Ecuador	DQ	
	Max dos Santos	Brazil	DQ	
	Mateo Romero	Colombia	DQ	

=== High jump ===
27 April

Rank	Name	Nationality	1.90	1.95	2.00	2.05	2.10	2.13	2.16	2.19	Result	Notes
1st place, gold medalist(s)	Thiago Moura	Brazil	–	–	–	o	o	–	o	xxx	2.16	
2nd place, silver medalist(s)	Fernando Ferreira	Brazil	–	–	–	xo	o	xo	xx–	x	2.13	
3rd place, bronze medalist(s)	Sebastián Daners	Uruguay	o	o	o	o	xxo	xxx			2.10	SB
4	Pedro Alamos	Chile	–	–	x–	o	xxx				2.05	
5	Santiago Barberia	Argentina	o	o	xo	xo	xxx				2.05	
6	Cristóbal Sahurie	Chile	o	–	o	xxx					2.00	
7	Mauro Pons	Uruguay	–	o	xo	xxx					2.00	
7	Jholeixon Rodríguez	Ecuador	o	o	xo	xxx					2.00	SB
7	Carlos Layoy	Argentina	–	o	xo	x–	xx				2.00	

=== Pole vault ===
25 April

Rank	Name	Nationality	4.80	5.00	5.10	5.20	5.30	5.35	5.40	5.45	5.50	Result	Notes
1st place, gold medalist(s)	Ricardo Montes de Oca	Venezuela	–	–	–	xo	–	xx–	o	–	–	5.40	=NR =NU20R
2nd place, silver medalist(s)	Guillermo Correa	Chile	–	o	–	xo	o	xo	xxo	x–	xx	5.40	=SB
3rd place, bronze medalist(s)	Lucas Alisson	Brazil	o	o	–	xo	o	o	xx–	x		5.35	
4	Thiago Braz	Brazil	o	–	–	o	o	–	xx–	x		5.30	SB
5	Agustín Carril	Argentina	–	xxo	xxo	xxo	xxx					5.20	PB
	Dyander Pacho	Ecuador	–	xxx								NM	

=== Long jump ===
27 April

Rank	Name	Nationality	#1	#2	#3	#4	#5	#6	Result	Notes
1st place, gold medalist(s)	Emiliano Lasa	Uruguay	7.61	7.95	7.97	x	7.95w	–	7.97	SB
2nd place, silver medalist(s)	Emanuel Archibald	Guyana	7.76w	7.51w	5.94w	7.64w	7.38w	x	7.76w	
3rd place, bronze medalist(s)	José Luis Mandros	Peru	7.53w	x	x	x	x	7.73w	7.73w	
4	Arnovis Dalmero	Colombia	x	x	7.64w	x	x	7.45	7.64w	
5	Gabriel Luiz Boza	Brazil	5.64w	7.64w	x	x	x	x	7.64w	
6	Lucas Marcelino dos Santos	Brazil	x	7.37	x	7.51w	x	7.51w	7.51w	
7	Carlos Valencia	Colombia	x	7.35w	x	7.42w	7.38w	x	7.42w	
8	Martín Saavedra	Argentina	6.79w	6.99	6.87w	2.69	6.98w	6.85	6.99	
9	Alexander Villalba	Paraguay	6.79	x	x				6.79	
10	Doniquel Werson	Suriname	6.70w	4.40	x				6.70w	
11	Ezequiel Bossio	Uruguay	6.49	6.47	6.52w				6.52w	
12	Christopher Thiessen	Paraguay	x	5.73w	x				5.73w	
	Leodan Torrealba	Venezuela	x	x	x				NM	
	Gabriel Ferrari	Argentina	x	x	x				NM	

=== Triple jump ===
25 April

Rank	Name	Nationality	#1	#2	#3	#4	#5	#6	Result	Notes
1st place, gold medalist(s)	Almir dos Santos	Brazil	16.27	16.68	–	16.31	x	x	16.68	SB
2nd place, silver medalist(s)	Elton Petronilho	Brazil	16.18	15.92w	16.26	x	16.10	x	16.26	SB
3rd place, bronze medalist(s)	Leodan Torrealba	Venezuela	15.91	16.22	15.42	15.74	16.02	16.11	16.22	
4	Jhon Valencia	Colombia	15.65	15.77	14.08	x	x	x	15.77	
5	Doniquel Werson	Suriname	15.16	15.39	15.11	15.25	15.53	15.58	15.58	SB
6	Nazareno Melgarejo	Argentina	14.76	14.85	14.95	14.97w	14.79	14.81	14.97w	

=== Shot put ===
27 April

Rank	Name	Nationality	#1	#2	#3	#4	#5	#6	Result	Notes
1st place, gold medalist(s)	Willian Dourado	Brazil	19.87	19.93	20.53	20.64	19.92	20.65	20.65	
2nd place, silver medalist(s)	Welington Morais	Brazil	19.59	19.66	20.28	20.07	x	19.96	20.28	
3rd place, bronze medalist(s)	Juan Manuel Arriéguez	Argentina	x	18.15	18.23	18.34	x	18.78	18.78	PB
4	Ignacio Carballo	Argentina	17.95	x	18.34	x	18.23	18.29	18.34	SB
5	Matías Puschel	Chile	16.98	16.61	17.84	17.40	18.06	x	18.06	SB

=== Discus throw ===
26 April

Rank	Name	Nationality	#1	#2	#3	#4	#5	#6	Result	Notes
1st place, gold medalist(s)	Claudio Romero	Chile	61.09	61.27	62.40	64.13	62.37	x	64.13	CR
2nd place, silver medalist(s)	Wellinton da Cruz Filho	Brazil	x	56.91	62.09	60.77	x	x	62.09	SB
3rd place, bronze medalist(s)	Mauricio Ortega	Colombia	61.91	61.12	61.44	x	59.89	x	61.91	
4	Lucas Nervi	Chile	55.39	x	x	x	x	60.64	60.64	SB
5	Juan José Caicedo	Ecuador	58.94	x	60.11	x	x	x	60.11	
6	Douglas dos Reis	Brazil	56.60	x	x	x	x	x	56.60	SB
7	Lázaro Bonora	Argentina	x	51.99	x	x	52.69	49.65	52.69	
8	Tomás Pacheco	Argentina	52.09	x	x	50.70	x	47.04	52.09	PB

=== Hammer throw ===
25 April

Rank	Name	Nationality	#1	#2	#3	#4	#5	#6	Result	Notes
1st place, gold medalist(s)	Joaquín Gómez	Argentina	x	73.00	x	77.69	x	76.88	77.69	CR, NR
2nd place, silver medalist(s)	Gabriel Kehr	Chile	75.81	76.90	76.69	x	76.73	74.67	76.90	SB
3rd place, bronze medalist(s)	Humberto Mansilla	Chile	73.98	75.84	75.32	76.06	x	76.61	76.61	SB
4	Alencar Pereira	Brazil	71.79	71.17	71.99	x	70.12	68.69	71.99	SB
5	Allan Wolski	Brazil	67.17	70.84	70.71	71.97	69.22	x	71.97	SB
6	Tomás Olivera	Argentina	66.43	68.01	x	66.19	67.98	x	68.01	

=== Javelin throw ===
27 April

Rank	Name	Nationality	#1	#2	#3	#4	#5	#6	Result	Notes
1st place, gold medalist(s)	Pedro Henrique Rodrigues	Brazil	75.50	77.54	77.92	x	x	77.23	77.92	SB
2nd place, silver medalist(s)	Billy Julio	Colombia	69.34	71.88	76.61	74.74	76.73	x	76.73	
3rd place, bronze medalist(s)	Lars Flaming	Paraguay	66.46	75.72	72.51	x	76.60	70.68	76.60	
4	Arthur Curvo	Brazil	72.02	69.74	68.69	69.92	73.45	71.20	73.45	PB
5	Giovanni Díaz	Paraguay	67.88	63.02	72.60	64.57	66.85		72.60	SB
6	Yirmar Torres	Ecuador	67.02	x	68.07	70.78	63.18	63.20	70.78	SB
7	Lautaro Techera	Uruguay	67.34	68.76	69.68	70.15	67.56	65.93	70.15	
8	Leslain Baird	Guyana	64.69	69.87	x	67.01	64.92		69.87	
9	Agustín Osorio	Argentina	62.23	x	64.28				64.28	SB
10	Carlos Rospigliosi	Peru	61.48	63.45	61.68				63.45	

=== Decathlon ===
25–26 April

The highest mark recorded in each event is highlighted in yellow

Rank	Athlete	Nationality	100m	LJ	SP	HJ	400m	110m H	DT	PV	JT	1500m	Points	Notes
1st place, gold medalist(s)	José Fernando Ferreira	Brazil	10.87	7.16	14.14	1.91	49.94	13.87w	43.38	4.60	65.03	5:10.91	7847	SB
2nd place, silver medalist(s)	Gerson Izaguirre	Venezuela	11.16	7.05	14.14	1.91	50.28	14.29w	42.20	4.20	49.57	5:18.24	7273	SB
3rd place, bronze medalist(s)	Pedro de Oliveira	Brazil	10.66	7.09w	14.46	1.85	47.54	14.57w	43.27	NM	51.38	4:30.46	7116	
4	Sergio Pandiani	Argentina	11.36	6.82	12.69	1.88	51.15	15.64w	41.97	3.90	51.85	4:29.39	7093	
5	Julio Angulo	Colombia	10.92	7.03	13.07	1.94	48.59	14.50w	46.80	NM	51.35	4:52.41	6929	
6	Max Moraga	Chile	11.12	6.67	11.98	1.82	49.22	15.66	34.73	3.80	57.53	4:52.46	6864	PB
7	Santiago Ford	Chile	11.24	6.91	13.70	2.00	51.05	14.84w	NM	4.20	62.23	5:18.25	6650	SB
8	Carlos Córdoba	Venezuela	11.30	6.88w	12.07	1.88	52.03	16.28	40.54	NM	54.12	4:55.31	6225	
9	Eric Gill	Argentina	10.93	6.53	11.87	1.79	51.89	15.67	35.29	3.30	34.59	5:09.27	6170	PB
10	Edgar Rosabal	Uruguay	11.60	6.49	10.45	1.79	55.11	15.79	31.24	4.10	51.06	5:06.79	6169	
11	Manuel Fernández	Uruguay	11.46	6.46	8.32	1.70	50.50	16.43	26.17	3.10	32.69	4:25.45	5738	PB

== Women's results ==
=== 100 metres ===
Heats – 25 April
Wind:
Heat 1: +1.3 m/s, Heat 2: +1.2 m/s

Rank	Heat	Name	Nationality	Time	Notes
1	1	Vitória Cristina Rosa	Brazil	11.32	Q, =SB
2	2	María Ignacia Montt	Chile	11.36	Q, PB
3	1	Anahí Suárez	Ecuador	11.40	Q, SB
4	2	Marlet Ospino	Colombia	11.48	Q, SB
5	1	Angélica Gamboa	Colombia	11.50	Q
5	1	Anaís Hernández	Chile	11.50	q, SB
5	2	Ana Carolina Azevedo	Brazil	11.50	Q
8	2	Aimara Nazareno	Ecuador	11.63	q, SB
9	1	María Florencia Lamboglia	Argentina	11.69	
10	2	Belén Fritzsche	Argentina	11.75	PB
11	1	Paula Daruich	Peru	11.80	SB
12	2	Macarena Giménez	Paraguay	11.85	SB
13	2	Leticia Arispe	Bolivia	11.89	
14	1	Xenia Hiebert	Paraguay	11.97	
15	2	Cayetana Chirinos	Peru	12.02	
16	1	Alinny Delgadillo	Bolivia	12.05	
17	1	Brandy Romero	Uruguay	12.26	

Final – 25 April
Wind:
+1.2 m/s

Rank	Lane	Name	Nationality	Time	Notes
1st place, gold medalist(s)	3	Vitória Cristina Rosa	Brazil	11.21	SB
2nd place, silver medalist(s)	5	Anahí Suárez	Ecuador	11.28	SB
3rd place, bronze medalist(s)	4	María Ignacia Montt	Chile	11.33	PB
4	2	Ana Carolina Azevedo	Brazil	11.35	
5	8	Anaís Hernández	Chile	11.42	PB
6	7	Angélica Gamboa	Colombia	11.44	11.432
7	6	Marlet Ospino	Colombia	11.44	11.439 SB
8	1	Aimara Nazareno	Ecuador	11.68	

=== 200 metres ===
Heats – 27 April
Wind:
Heat 1: +0.8 m/s, Heat 2: +3.1 m/s, Heat 3: +1.9 m/s

Rank	Heat	Name	Nationality	Time	Notes
1	2	Anahí Suárez	Ecuador	23.43	Q
2	3	Isidora Jiménez	Chile	23.52	Q, SB
3	1	Nicole Caicedo	Ecuador	23.57	Q
4	3	Lorraine Martins	Brazil	23.60	Q, SB
5	2	Anaís Hernández	Chile	23.62	Q
6	1	Lina Licona	Colombia	23.74	Q
7	2	Cristal Cuervo	Panama	23.77	q
8	1	Vitória Cristina Rosa	Brazil	23.91	q
9	3	Laura Martínez	Colombia	24.25	24.249
9	3	María Florencia Lamboglia	Argentina	24.25	24.249
11	2	Guillermina Cossio	Argentina	24.26	
12	3	Macarena Giménez	Paraguay	24.75	PB
13	1	Alinny Delgadillo	Bolivia	24.78	
14	2	Cayetana Chirinos	Peru	25.05	
15	2	Leticia Arispe	Bolivia	25.11	
16	1	Brandy Romero	Uruguay	25.36	
17	1	Ruth Báez	Paraguay	26.35	SB

Final – 27 April
Wind:
+2.6 m/s

Rank	Lane	Name	Nationality	Time	Notes
1st place, gold medalist(s)	7	Nicole Caicedo	Ecuador	23.07	
2nd place, silver medalist(s)	1	Vitória Cristina Rosa	Brazil	23.25	23.243
2nd place, silver medalist(s)	5	Anahí Suárez	Ecuador	23.25	23.243
4	8	Lina Licona	Colombia	23.30	
5	4	Lorraine Martins	Brazil	23.38	
6	3	Anaís Hernández	Chile	23.44	
7	6	Isidora Jiménez	Chile	23.59	
8	2	Cristal Cuervo	Panama	23.79	

=== 400 metres ===
Heats – 25 April

Rank	Heat	Name	Nationality	Time	Notes
1	1	Evelis Aguilar	Colombia	50.63	Q, CR
2	1	Tiffani Marinho	Brazil	52.27	Q
3	2	Martina Weil	Chile	52.32	Q, SB
4	1	Nicole Caicedo	Ecuador	52.49	Q, SB
5	2	Jainy Barreto	Brazil	53.92	Q, SB
6	2	Paola Loboa	Colombia	54.12	Q
7	1	Noelia Martínez	Argentina	55.24	q, SB
8	2	Evelin Mercado	Ecuador	55.50	q
9	1	Nilsa Arce	Bolivia	55.94	
10	2	Malena Galvan	Argentina	56.01	
11	1	Montserrath Gauto	Paraguay	56.68	PB
12	1	Laura Vila	Peru	57.02	SB
13	1	Giuliana Oroná	Uruguay	59.31	
14	2	Camila Pérez	Uruguay	59.57	
15	2	Milva Aranda	Paraguay	1:01.30	PB

Final – 26 April

Rank	Lane	Name	Nationality	Time	Notes
1st place, gold medalist(s)	5	Martina Weil	Chile	51.14	SB
2nd place, silver medalist(s)	4	Evelis Aguilar	Colombia	51.26	
3rd place, bronze medalist(s)	3	Nicole Caicedo	Ecuador	53.05	
4	6	Tiffani Marinho	Brazil	53.19	
5	7	Jainy Barreto	Brazil	54.09	
6	8	Paola Loboa	Colombia	54.85	
7	2	Evelin Mercado	Ecuador	56.45	
8	1	Noelia Martínez	Argentina	57.36	

=== 800 metres ===
Heats – 26 April

Rank	Heat	Name	Nationality	Time	Notes
1	1	Valentina Barrientos	Chile	2:09.34	Q
2	1	Déborah Rodríguez	Uruguay	2:10.28	Q
3	2	Mayara Leite	Brazil	2:10.29	Q
4	2	Anita Poma	Peru	2:10.35	Q
5	2	Berdine Castillo	Chile	2:10.38	Q
6	1	María Rojas	Venezuela	2:10.43	Q
7	2	Martina Escudero	Argentina	2:10.71	q
8	1	Flávia de Lima	Brazil	2:10.83	q, SB
9	2	Leidy Sinisterra	Colombia	2:11.07	q, SB
10	1	Cecilia Gómez	Bolivia	2:11.48	
11	2	Pamela Barreto	Ecuador	2:11.53	SB
12	1	Karen Rocca	Argentina	2:12.70	
13	1	Araceli Martínez	Paraguay	2:16.87	SB
14	2	Flavia Lanza	Uruguay	2:18.17	

Final – 27 April

Rank	Name	Nationality	Time	Notes
1st place, gold medalist(s)	Déborah Rodríguez	Uruguay	2:04.70	
2nd place, silver medalist(s)	Mayara Leite	Brazil	2:05.33	
3rd place, bronze medalist(s)	Berdine Castillo	Chile	2:05.89	
4	María Rojas	Venezuela	2:07.86	
5	Valentina Barrientos	Chile	2:08.74	
6	Leidy Sinisterra	Colombia	2:09.90	SB
7	Anita Poma	Peru	2:10.50	
8	Martina Escudero	Argentina	2:12.86	
9	Flávia de Lima	Brazil	2:13.81	

=== 1500 metres ===
25 April

Rank	Name	Nationality	Time	Notes
1st place, gold medalist(s)	Micaela Levaggi	Argentina	4:25.99	
2nd place, silver medalist(s)	María Pía Fernández	Uruguay	4:28.27	
3rd place, bronze medalist(s)	July da Silva	Brazil	4:28.39	SB
4	Anita Poma	Peru	4:29.31	
5	Javiera Faletto	Chile	4:29.62	
6	Joselyn Brea	Venezuela	4:32.43	SB
7	Karol Luna	Colombia	4:32.83	
8	Karen Rocca	Argentina	4:33.20	
9	Benita Parra	Bolivia	4:33.75	PB
10	Leidy Rivera	Colombia	4:34.79	SB
11	María Leticia Añazco	Paraguay	4:42.11	
12	Flavia Lanza	Uruguay	4:42.81	
13	Luz Arias	Peru	4:43.21	
14	María Caballero	Paraguay	4:43.68	
15	Luise Braga	Brazil	4:45.85	

=== 5000 metres ===
27 April

Rank	Name	Nationality	Time	Notes
1st place, gold medalist(s)	Sheyla Eulogio	Peru	15:51.27	
2nd place, silver medalist(s)	Edymar Brea	Venezuela	15:55.03	SB
3rd place, bronze medalist(s)	Daiana Ocampo	Argentina	15:57.15	SB
4	Dina Velásquez	Peru	15:59.91	PB
5	Joselyn Brea	Venezuela	16:00.69	SB
6	Benita Parra	Bolivia	16:18.53	
7	Tatiane Raquel da Silva	Brazil	16:26.12	SB
8	Angela Gómez	Argentina	16:26.67	
9	Javiera Faletto	Chile	16:27.36	
10	Karol Luna	Colombia	16:30.56	NU20R
11	Carmen Toaquinza	Ecuador	16:31.73	SB
12	Pedrina Vieira	Brazil	16:56.04	SB
13	Leydi Roura	Ecuador	17:31.73	
	Danna Díaz	Colombia	DNS	

=== 10,000 metres ===
25 April

Rank	Name	Nationality	Time	Notes
1st place, gold medalist(s)	Nubia Oliveira	Brazil	34:06.56	PB
2nd place, silver medalist(s)	Florencia Borelli	Argentina	34:08.01	
3rd place, bronze medalist(s)	Edymar Brea	Venezuela	34:08.54	SB
4	Daiana Ocampo	Argentina	34:10.53	SB
5	Saida Meneses	Peru	34:11.48	
6	Micaela Rivera	Peru	34:17.40	
7	Carmen Toaquinza	Ecuador	34:36.53	PB
8	Amanda de Oliveira	Brazil	34:58.30	

=== 100 metres hurdles ===
Heats – 27 April
Wind:
Heat 1: +1.6 m/s, Heat 2: +1.2 m/s

Rank	Heat	Name	Nationality	Time	Notes
1	1	Ketiley Batista	Brazil	13.41	Q
2	2	María Alejandra Rocha	Colombia	13.59	Q
3	2	Vitoria Alves	Brazil	13.68	Q
4	1	Catalina Arellano	Chile	13.80	Q
5	1	Luciana Zapata	Colombia	13.96	Q
6	2	Génesis Romero	Venezuela	14.14	Q
7	1	Leyka Archibold	Panama	14.24	q
8	2	Paula Leiva	Argentina	14.49	q
9	2	Guadalupe Ezquerra	Uruguay	15.20	PB
10	1	Rossmary Paredes	Paraguay	15.74	SB

Final – 27 April
Wind:
+2.6 m/s

Rank	Lane	Name	Nationality	Time	Notes
1st place, gold medalist(s)	4	Ketiley Batista	Brazil	13.22	
2nd place, silver medalist(s)	5	María Alejandra Rocha	Colombia	13.42	
3rd place, bronze medalist(s)	3	Vitoria Alves	Brazil	13.55	
4	7	Génesis Romero	Venezuela	13.59	
5	6	Catalina Arellano	Chile	13.75	
6	1	Leyka Archibold	Panama	13.94	
	2	Paula Leiva	Argentina	DNF	
	8	Luciana Zapata	Colombia	DNS	

=== 400 metres hurdles ===
26 April

Rank	Lane	Name	Nationality	Time	Notes
1st place, gold medalist(s)	4	Gianna Woodruff	Panama	56.57	SB
2nd place, silver medalist(s)	6	María Alejandra Rocha	Colombia	57.48	
3rd place, bronze medalist(s)	7	Camille de Oliveira	Brazil	58.05	
4	5	Chayenne da Silva	Brazil	59.70	
5	3	Camila Correa	Argentina	1:02.83	
6	8	Leyka Archibold	Panama	1:03.44	
7	2	Fátima Amarilla	Paraguay	1:04.60	

=== 3000 metres steeplechase ===
26 April

Rank	Name	Nationality	Time	Notes
1st place, gold medalist(s)	Tatiane Raquel da Silva	Brazil	9:40.07	SB
2nd place, silver medalist(s)	Micaela Levaggi	Argentina	9:42.09	PB
3rd place, bronze medalist(s)	Mirelle Leite	Brazil	10:13.35	SB
4	Laura Camargo	Colombia	10:29.91	
5	Leydi Roura	Ecuador	10:38.21	
	Carolina Lozano	Argentina	DNF	

=== 4 × 100 metres relay ===
27 April

Rank	Lane	Nation	Competitors	Time	Notes
1st place, gold medalist(s)	8	Brazil	Gabriela Mourão, Daniele Campigotto, Lorraine Martins, Vanessa dos Santos	44.35	
2nd place, silver medalist(s)	3	Ecuador	Aimara Nazareno, Anahí Suárez, Nicole Caicedo, Jazmine Chala	45.04	
3rd place, bronze medalist(s)	1	Argentina	Belén Fritzsche, María Florencia Lamboglia, Valentina Napolitano, Guillermina Cossio	46.57	
4	4	Peru	Adriana Chávez, Cayetana Chirinos, Laura Vila, Paula Daruich	46.90	
5	6	Paraguay	Larissa Báez, Macarena Giménez, Ruth Báez, Xenia Hiebert	47.36	
6	5	Uruguay	Millie Díaz, Sofía Ingold, Guadalupe Ezquerra, Brandy Romero	50.14	
	2	Chile	Anaís Hernández, María Ignacia Montt, Isidora Jiménez, Antonia Ramírez	DNF	
	7	Colombia	Marlet Ospino, Angélica Gamboa, Danna Banquez, Yajaira Murillo	DNF	

=== 4 × 400 metres relay ===
27 April

Rank	Lane	Nation	Competitors	Time	Notes
1st place, gold medalist(s)	2	Colombia	Nahomy Castro, Lina Licona, Paola Loboa, Evelis Aguilar	3:33.29	
2nd place, silver medalist(s)	6	Brazil	Anny de Bassi, Tiffani Marinho, Jainy Barreto, Letícia Lima	3:34.28	
3rd place, bronze medalist(s)	4	Chile	Stephanie Saavedra, Antonia Ramírez, Violeta Arnaiz, Martina Weil	3:37.64	
4	7	Ecuador	Pamela Barreto, Anahí Suárez, Evelin Mercado, Nicole Caicedo	3:42.29	
5	8	Argentina	Malena Galvan, Camila Correa, Marlene Koss, María Florencia Lamboglia	3:56.22	
6	3	Uruguay	Giuliana Oroná, Guadalupe Ezquerra, Flavia Lanza, Camila Pérez	4:09.16	
	5	Paraguay		DNS	

=== 20 kilometres walk ===
26 April

Rank	Name	Nationality	Time	Notes
1st place, gold medalist(s)	Viviane Lyra	Brazil	1:28:30	CR, SB
2nd place, silver medalist(s)	Gabriela Muniz	Brazil	1:34:50	SB

=== High jump ===
26 April

Rank	Name	Nationality	1.60	1.65	1.70	1.75	1.78	1.81	1.83	Result	Notes
1st place, gold medalist(s)	Hellen Tenorio	Colombia	–	o	o	o	o	xxo	xxx	1.81	
2nd place, silver medalist(s)	Arielly Rodrigues	Brazil	–	–	o	xxo	xo	xxx		1.78	SB
3rd place, bronze medalist(s)	Valdiléia Martins	Brazil	–	–	o	xo	xxx			1.75	
4	Lorena Aires	Uruguay	–	o	o	xxx				1.70	
5	Mónica Montero	Chile	o	xx–	x					1.60	

=== Pole vault ===
27 April

Rank	Name	Nationality	3.00	3.20	3.40	3.70	3.80	3.90	4.00	4.15	4.30	4.40	Result	Notes
1st place, gold medalist(s)	Juliana Campos	Brazil	–	–	–	o	–	o	xo	xo	o	xxx	4.30	
2nd place, silver medalist(s)	Isabel de Quadros	Brazil	–	–	–	–	o	–	xxx				3.80	
3rd place, bronze medalist(s)	Aldana Garibaldi	Argentina	o	o	xxx								3.20	
4	Josefina Britez	Paraguay	xo	xo	xxx								3.20	

=== Long jump ===
27 April

Rank	Name	Nationality	#1	#2	#3	#4	#5	#6	Result	Notes
1st place, gold medalist(s)	Natalia Linares	Colombia	6.43	6.76w	6.81w	6.67w	6.67w	6.77w	6.81	
2nd place, silver medalist(s)	Lissandra Campos	Brazil	x	x	5.85	6.39	6.48w	6.46w	6.48w	
3rd place, bronze medalist(s)	Yuliana Angulo	Ecuador	x	6.47w	6.47	x	x	6.24w	6.47w	
4	Leticia Oro Melo	Brazil	x	x	5.74w	6.32	6.36w	6.14w	6.36w	
5	Nathalee Aranda	Panama	6.07w	x	x	x	5.38	6.33w	6.33w	
6	Rocío Muñoz	Chile	5.90w	6.16w	5.95	5.99	x	x	6.16w	
7	Victoria Zanolli	Argentina	5.80 w	5.81	5.75w	5.62w	x	5.65w	5.81	
8	Paula Daruich	Peru	5.43w	5.79w	5.48	5.65	5.69w	5.59w	5.79w	
9	Annalisa Redmond	Guyana	x	x	5.62w				5.62w	
10	Victoria Duarte	Paraguay	x	5.07w	x				5.07w	
11	Josefina Britez	Paraguay	x	4.58	4.91w				4.91w	

=== Triple jump ===
25 April

Rank	Name	Nationality	#1	#2	#3	#4	#5	#6	Result	Notes
1st place, gold medalist(s)	Gabriele dos Santos	Brazil	x	x	13.52	13.96	x	x	13.96	
2nd place, silver medalist(s)	Regiclécia da Silva	Brazil	13.62	x	13.76	x	x	13.59	13.76	PB
3rd place, bronze medalist(s)	Natricia Hooper	Guyana	13.43	13.49	13.33	x	13.64	13.39	13.64	
4	Adriana Chila	Ecuador	12.97	13.14	13.31	12.94	13.14	13.30	13.31	
5	Rocío Muñoz	Chile	12.46	12.63	12.67	12.66	12.74	12.88	12.88	PB
6	Génesis Pire	Venezuela	12.60	12.59	x	12.86w	x	12.65	12.86w	
7	Luciana Gennari	Argentina	x	12.11	12.41	12.36	12.59w	12.56	12.59w	
8	Valeria Quispe	Bolivia	12.31	x	x	x	12.52	12.51	12.52	SB
9	Millie Díaz	Uruguay	x	11.86	11.79				11.86	

=== Shot put ===
25 April

Rank	Name	Nationality	#1	#2	#3	#4	#5	#6	Result	Notes
1st place, gold medalist(s)	Ivana Gallardo	Chile	16.24	16.79	17.55	x	16.82	17.07	17.55	
2nd place, silver medalist(s)	Ahymara Espinoza	Venezuela	15.74	16.51	16.36	16.49	16.46	16.24	16.51	SB
3rd place, bronze medalist(s)	Ana Caroline Silva	Brazil	15.46	x	x	x	16.09	x	16.09	
4	Mariela Pérez	Chile	x	16.05	15.75	14.97	x	x	16.05	PB
5	Ailén Armada	Argentina	14.14	15.31	x	x	14.79	x	15.31	SB
6	Belsy Quiñónez	Ecuador	14.14	x	15.20	14.50	14.96	x	15.20	NU20R

=== Discus throw ===
26 April

Rank	Name	Nationality	#1	#2	#3	#4	#5	#6	Result	Notes
1st place, gold medalist(s)	Izabela da Silva	Brazil	62.87	60.91	x	x	62.31	x	62.87	SB
2nd place, silver medalist(s)	Andressa de Morais	Brazil	x	x	59.55	x	60.16	x	60.16	
3rd place, bronze medalist(s)	Yerlin Mesa	Colombia	54.98	x	55.44	55.69	x	51.99	55.69	SB
4	Karen Gallardo	Chile	x	49.46	51.75	51.78	52.42	51.42	52.42	
5	Ottaynis Febres	Venezuela	x	43.12	47.54	46.06	48.96	51.30	51.30	
6	Ailén Armada	Argentina	50.66	49.91	x	x	x	48.93	50.66	SB
7	María Candela Ratibel	Argentina	45.85	x	x	x	x	x	45.85	
8	Belsy Quiñónez	Ecuador	x	x	32.91	x	38.64	x	38.64	

=== Hammer throw ===
25 April

Rank	Name	Nationality	#1	#2	#3	#4	#5	#6	Result	Notes
1st place, gold medalist(s)	Rosa Rodríguez	Venezuela	71.04	x	x	x	66.64	x	71.04	SB
2nd place, silver medalist(s)	Ximena Zorrilla	Peru	x	x	64.76	65.32	65.44	67.52	67.52	
3rd place, bronze medalist(s)	Mariana García	Chile	64.38	66.06	65.02	65.65	65.12	64.33	66.06	
4	Mariana Marcelino	Brazil	61.85	50.86	58.64	55.63	x	x	61.85	SB
5	Ana Caroline Silva	Brazil	x	52.12	57.63	61.05	x	x	61.05	SB
6	Yenniver Veroes	Venezuela	x	57.15	59.15	x	61.04	56.74	61.04	
7	Nereida Santa Cruz	Ecuador	x	59.10	x	60.86	x	x	60.86	SB
8	Carmela Cocco	Argentina	55.08	58.24	57.47	54.38	58.18	59.61	59.61	PB
9	Giuliana Baigorria	Argentina	x	55.53	53.76				55.53	

=== Javelin throw ===
25 April

Rank	Name	Nationality	#1	#2	#3	#4	#5	#6	Result	Notes
1st place, gold medalist(s)	Jucilene de Lima	Brazil	x	59.56	62.32	58.50	61.67	59.12	62.32	CR, SB
2nd place, silver medalist(s)	Juleisy Angulo	Ecuador	62.25	58.69	–	x	61.09	58.28	62.25	NR
3rd place, bronze medalist(s)	Daniella Nisimura	Brazil	57.74	60.12	57.87	58.13	x	x	60.12	PB
4	Manuela Rotundo	Uruguay	56.48	x	x	x	54.49	45.55	56.48	
5	María Lucelly Murillo	Colombia	51.36	54.63	x	53.95	x	x	54.63	
6	Julieta Salguero	Argentina	51.92	45.57	50.72	49.75	48.44	x	51.92	PB
7	Fiorella Veloso	Paraguay	43.65	–	46.19	–	42.28	–	46.19	SB
8	María José Cáceres	Paraguay	40.28	43.86	41.62	41.40	43.72	43.19	43.86	PB
9	Hashly Ayovi	Ecuador	40.91	x	35.64	41.40	43.72	43.19	43.72	

=== Heptathlon ===
26–27 April

The highest mark recorded in each event is highlighted in yellow

Rank	Athlete	Nationality	100m H	HJ	SP	200m	LJ	JT	800m	Points	Notes
1st place, gold medalist(s)	Martha Araújo	Colombia	13.13w	1.73	13.55	24.43w	6.55	47.62	2:17.38 PB	6396	WL, CR
2nd place, silver medalist(s)	Roberta dos Santos	Brazil	14.37w	1.70	13.59	25.58w	5.95w	37.50	2:28.13	5553	SB
3rd place, bronze medalist(s)	Tamara de Sousa	Brazil	14.01w	1.64	14.05	25.63w	5.85w	40.27	2:32.49	5525	SB
4	Ana Paula Argüello	Paraguay	13.83w	1.58	12.57	25.09w	5.77w	30.30	2:43.39	5090	SB
5	Génesis Romero	Venezuela	13.41w	1.55	10.65	24.97w	5.65	32.86	2:45.45	4990	PB
6	Sofía Ingold	Uruguay	14.96w	NM	8.40	26.90w	5.07w	28.95	2:49.06	3500	SB

== Mixed results ==
=== 4 × 400 metres relay ===
25 April

Rank	Lane	Nation	Competitors	Time	Notes
1st place, gold medalist(s)	3	Brazil	Jadson Lima, Erica Cavalheiro, Tiago da Silva, Anny de Bassi	3:17.73	
2nd place, silver medalist(s)	4	Colombia	Daniel Balanta, Paola Loboa, Luis Arrieta, Lina Licona	3:19.18	
3rd place, bronze medalist(s)	6	Argentina	Agustín Pinti, María Florencia Lamboglia, Elián Larregina, Noelia Martínez	3:23.12	NR
4	2	Chile	Martín Zabala, Stephanie Saavedra, Francisco Muñoz, Violeta Arnaiz	3:24.13	
5	5	Ecuador	Alan Minda, Pamela Barreto, Francisco Tejeda, Evelin Mercado	3:30.75	
6	7	Paraguay	Giuliano Ruffinelli, Fatima Amarilla, Christian Acosta, Montserrath Gauto	3:37.03	
7	8	Uruguay	Matías González, Camila Pérez, Fabricio Da Rosa, Giuliana Oroná	3:37.38	
