= 2024 South American Indoor Championships in Athletics – Results =

These are the full results of the 2024 South American Indoor Championships in Athletics which took place in Cochabamba, Bolivia, on 27 to 28 January at the Estadio de Atletismo del Gobierno Autónomo Municipal de Cochabamba.

== Men's results ==
=== 60 metres ===
27 January

Rank	Lane	Name	Nationality	Time	Notes
1st place, gold medalist(s)	4	Felipe Bardi	Brazil	6.58	CR
2nd place, silver medalist(s)	7	Aron Earl	Peru	6.76	
3rd place, bronze medalist(s)	3	David Vivas	Venezuela	6.78	
4	6	Tito Hinojosa	Bolivia	6.82	
5	2	Julian Vargas	Bolivia	6.83	
6	8	Bryant Alamo	Venezuela	6.83	
7	5	Erik Cardoso	Brazil	6.84	
8	1	Luis Humberto Angulo	Peru	7.09	

=== 400 metres ===
Heats – 27 January

Rank	Heat	Name	Nationality	Time	Notes
1	1	Elián Larregina	Argentina	47.82	Q
2	2	Lucas Vilar	Brazil	47.85	Q
3	2	Lucas Carvalho	Brazil	47.91	Q
4	1	Kelvis Padrino	Venezuela	48.14	Q
5	2	Javier Gómez	Venezuela	48.28	q
6	2	Mateo Bustamante	Bolivia	48.92	q
7	2	Marcelo Pérez	Bolivia	49.01	
8	1	Nery Peñaloza	Bolivia	49.49	
9	1	Marcos González	Paraguay	49.50	

Final – 28 January

Rank	Lane	Name	Nationality	Time	Notes
1st place, gold medalist(s)	5	Elián Larregina	Argentina	46.37	CR
2nd place, silver medalist(s)	6	Lucas Vilar	Brazil	47.33	
3rd place, bronze medalist(s)	3	Kelvis Padrino	Venezuela	47.39	
4	4	Lucas Carvalho	Brazil	47.88	
5	2	Javier Gómez	Venezuela	48.12	
6	1	Mateo Bustamante	Bolivia	48.87	

=== 800 metres ===
28 January

Rank	Heat	Name	Nationality	Time	Notes
1st place, gold medalist(s)	2	José Antonio Maita	Venezuela	1:54.13	
2nd place, silver medalist(s)	2	Ryan López	Venezuela	1:54.56	
3rd place, bronze medalist(s)	2	Marco Vilca	Peru	1:55.04	
4	2	Guilherme Kurtz	Brazil	1:57.60	
5	1	Ramiro Ulunque	Bolivia	1:58.52	
6	1	Leandro Daza	Bolivia	2:00.76	
7	1	Fermín González	Bolivia	2:04.07	
	2	Eduardo Ribeiro	Brazil	DQ	

=== 1500 metres ===
27 January

Rank	Name	Nationality	Time	Notes
1st place, gold medalist(s)	David Ninavia	Bolivia	3:56.65	
2nd place, silver medalist(s)	Guilherme Kurtz	Brazil	4:00.38	
3rd place, bronze medalist(s)	Thiago André	Brazil	4:00.54	
4	Daniel Toroya	Bolivia	4:03.23	
5	José Zabala	Argentina	4:07.09	
6	Ryan López	Venezuela	4:09.02	

=== 3000 metres ===
28 January

Rank	Name	Nationality	Time	Notes
1st place, gold medalist(s)	David Ninavia	Bolivia	8:26.73	CR, NR
2nd place, silver medalist(s)	Daniel Toroya	Bolivia	8:37.25	
3rd place, bronze medalist(s)	Juan Jorge Gonzales	Bolivia	8:45.05	

=== 60 metres hurdles ===
28 January

Rank	Lane	Name	Nationality	Time	Notes
1st place, gold medalist(s)	4	Eduardo de Deus	Brazil	7.58	=AR, =CR
2nd place, silver medalist(s)	2	Martín Sáenz	Chile	7.66	NR
3rd place, bronze medalist(s)	8	Brayan Rojas	Colombia	7.74	
4	5	Denner Cordeiro	Brazil	7.93	
5	3	Renzo Cremaschi	Argentina	7.98	
6	6	Mauricio Sandoval	Bolivia	8.61	
7	7	Josué Loaiza	Bolivia	8.68	.677
8	1	Luis Albert Claure	Bolivia	8.68	.678

=== 4 × 400 meters relay ===
28 January

Rank	Nation	Athletes	Time	Note
1st place, gold medalist(s)	Venezuela	Javier Gómez, Julio Rodríguez, Kelvis Padrino, José Antonio Maita	3:11.41	CR
2nd place, silver medalist(s)	Bolivia	Mateo Bustamante, Marcelo Pérez, Ikenna Ibe-Akobi, Nery Peñaloza	3:17.98	

=== High jump ===
28 January

Rank	Name	Nationality	1.80	2.00	2.05	2.10	2.15	2.18	2.21	2.24	2.26	Result	Notes
1st place, gold medalist(s)	Fernando Ferreira	Brazil	–	–	o	o	xxo	o	xxo	xx–	x	2.21	
2nd place, silver medalist(s)	Thiago Moura	Brazil	–	–	xo	o	o	xxx				2.15	
3rd place, bronze medalist(s)	Carlos Layoy	Argentina	–	xo	o	xo	xxo	xxx				2.15	
	José André Camacho	Bolivia	xxx									NM	

=== Pole vault ===
27 January

Rank	Name	Nationality	4.90	5.10	5.20	5.30	Result	Notes
1st place, gold medalist(s)	Ricardo Montes de Oca	Venezuela	o	xo	o	xxx	5.20	
	Augusto Dutra de Oliveira	Brazil	xxx				NM	

=== Long jump ===
28 January

Rank	Name	Nationality	#1	#2	#3	#4	#5	#6	Result	Notes
1st place, gold medalist(s)	Arnovis Dalmero	Colombia	7.97	x	x	8.06	x	x	8.06	
2nd place, silver medalist(s)	Emiliano Lasa	Uruguay	8.00	7.82	7.89	–	7.94	x	8.00	
3rd place, bronze medalist(s)	Lucas dos Santos	Brazil	7.71	x	7.92	x	x	7.87	7.92	
4	Vicente Belgeri	Chile	7.33	7.36	7.31	x	x	x	7.36	
5	Fabricio Mautino	Peru	6.77	7.00	7.23	x	x	–	7.23	
6	Dusan Vlahovic	Bolivia	6.44	6.40	6.33	6.62	6.54	6.81	6.81	
7	Ricardo Montes de Oca	Venezuela	6.64	5.28	x	x	6.31	x	6.64	
	Luis Reyes	Chile							DNS	

=== Triple jump ===
28 January

Rank	Name	Nationality	#1	#2	#3	#4	#5	#6	Result	Notes
1st place, gold medalist(s)	Leodan Torrealba	Venezuela	15.31	'16.24 '	15.38	15.70	15.70	15.61	16.24	
2nd place, silver medalist(s)	Geiner Moreno	Colombia	x	15.84	x	16.06	x	16.22	16.22	NR
3rd place, bronze medalist(s)	Maximiliano Díaz	Argentina	14.82	x	x	16.00	x	16.22	16.00	
4	Mateus de Sá	Brazil	x	15.97	x	x	x	15.81	15.97	
5	Luis Reyes	Chile	x	15.86	15.72	15.75	15.58	x	15.86	
6	Mauricio Rivera	Bolivia	x	x	x	14.17	14.09	x	14.17	

=== Shot put ===
28 January

Rank	Name	Nationality	#1	#2	#3	#4	#5	#6	Result	Notes
1st place, gold medalist(s)	Darlan Romani	Brazil	20.81	20.98	20.80	21.10	x	20.68	21.10	
2nd place, silver medalist(s)	Nazareno Sasia	Argentina	19.05	18.97	19.35	19.09	19.64	19.79	19.79	
3rd place, bronze medalist(s)	Welington Morais	Brazil	18.91	19.36	X	19.25	19.15	19.50	19.50	
4	Ignacio Carballo	Argentina	x	17.24	17.68	17.72	18.08	17.97	18.08	
5	Joaquín Ballivián	Chile	16.35	16.86	16.07	16.53	17.16	17.37	17.37	
6	Matias Puschel	Chile	15.78	17.16	16.16	17.05	16.39	16.51	17.16	

=== Heptathlon ===
27–28 January

The highest mark recorded in each event is highlighted in yellow

Rank	Athlete	Nationality	60m	LJ	SP	HJ	60m H	PV	1000m	Points	Notes
1st place, gold medalist(s)	José Fernando Ferreira	Brazil	6.90	6.99	13.63	2.02	7.93	4.80	3:02.96	5741	
2nd place, silver medalist(s)	Gerson Izaguirre	Venezuela	7.08	7.37	14.68	1.96	8.00	4.40	3:02.80	5644	
3rd place, bronze medalist(s)	Santiago Ford	Chile	7.09	7.41	13.80	2.05	8.27	4.40	3:01.81	5623	
4	Lucas Catanhede	Brazil	7.15	7.03	11.37	1.90	8.47	3.80	2:43.21	5200	
5	Enrique Bellott	Bolivia	7.21	6.11	11.48	1.75	8.94	3.00	3:34.87	4034	
6	Lucas Rojas	Bolivia	7.69	5.98	9.77	1.69	10.27	3.40	3:13.57	3728	
7	Alejandro Figueroa	Bolivia	7.77	5.59	8.47	1.54	10.09	2.90	2:50.99	3553	

== Women's results ==
=== 60 metres ===
Heats – 27 January

Rank	Heat	Name	Nationality	Time	Notes
1	2	Vitoria Cristina Rosa	Brazil	7.34	Q
2	1	María Florencia Lamboglia	Argentina	7.42	Q, NR
3	1	Lorraine Martins	Brazil	7.44	Q
4	2	Anaís Hernández	Chile	7.46	Q
5	1	Laura Martínez	Colombia	7.48	Q
6	2	Guadalupe Torrez	Bolivia	7.50	Q
7	2	Macarena Giménez	Paraguay	7.53	q
8	1	Leticia Arispe	Bolivia	7.62	q
9	1	Paula Daruich	Peru	7.66	
10	2	Alini Delgadillo	Bolivia	7.68	
11	2	Martina Coronato	Uruguay	7.69	
12	2	Cayetana Chirinos	Peru	7.74	
13	1	Ruth Báez	Paraguay	7.87	

Final – 27 January

Rank	Lane	Name	Nationality	Time	Notes
1st place, gold medalist(s)	4	Vitoria Cristina Rosa	Brazil	7.32	
2nd place, silver medalist(s)	2	Laura Martínez	Colombia	7.40	
3rd place, bronze medalist(s)	6	Anaís Hernández	Chile	7.41	
4	7	Guadalupe Torrez	Bolivia	7.41	
5	5	María Florencia Lamboglia	Argentina	7.42	=NR
6	1	Macarena Giménez	Paraguay	7.52	
7	3	Lorraine Martins	Brazil	7.55	
8	8	Leticia Arispe	Bolivia	7.62	

=== 400 metres ===
28 January

Rank	Lane	Name	Nationality	Time	Notes
1st place, gold medalist(s)	5	Tiffani Marinho	Brazil	53.47	
2nd place, silver medalist(s)	3	Noelia Martínez	Argentina	55.59	
3rd place, bronze medalist(s)	6	Tábata de Carvalho	Brazil	56.35	
4	2	Mariana Arce	Bolivia	57.65	
5	1	Tania Guasace	Bolivia	1:03.04	
6	4	Cecilia Gómez	Bolivia	1:07.13	

=== 800 metres ===
28 January

Rank	Name	Nationality	Time	Notes
1st place, gold medalist(s)	María Pía Fernández	Uruguay	2:08.20	CR
2nd place, silver medalist(s)	Berdine Castillo	Chile	2:09.76	
3rd place, bronze medalist(s)	Flávia de Lima	Brazil	2:11.34	
4	Cecilia Gómez	Bolivia	2:11.78	
5	Tania Guasace	Bolivia	2:12.47	
6	Uhuru Rocha	Brazil	2:18.22	

=== 1500 metres ===
27 January

Rank	Name	Nationality	Time	Notes
1st place, gold medalist(s)	Anita Poma	Peru	4:24.72	CR
2nd place, silver medalist(s)	María Pía Fernández	Uruguay	4:27.48	NR
3rd place, bronze medalist(s)	Benita Parra	Bolivia	4:39.33	
4	Flávia de Lima	Brazil	5:07.57	
5	Tatiana Poma	Bolivia	5:10.10	

=== 3000 metres ===
28 January

Rank	Name	Nationality	Time	Notes
1st place, gold medalist(s)	Benita Parra	Bolivia	10:05.90	
2nd place, silver medalist(s)	Tatiana Poma	Bolivia	11:02.14	

=== 60 metres hurdles ===
28 January

Rank	Lane	Name	Nationality	Time	Notes
1st place, gold medalist(s)	4	Ketiley Batista	Brazil	8.09	CR
2nd place, silver medalist(s)	5	Vitoria Alves	Brazil	8.55	
3rd place, bronze medalist(s)	3	Millie Díaz	Uruguay	8.82	NR
4	6	Sofia Ingold	Uruguay	9.12	
5	2	Camila Jiménez	Bolivia	9.24	
6	7	Andrea Bravo	Bolivia	9.70	

=== 4 × 400 meters relay ===
28 January

Rank	Nation	Athletes	Time	Note
1st place, gold medalist(s)	Bolivia	Cecilia Gómez, Tania Guasace, Valentina Rojas, Mariana Arce	3:52.49	
2nd place, silver medalist(s)	Uruguay	Martina Coronato, Millie Díaz, María Pía Fernández, Sofia Ingold	4:09.39	NR

=== High jump ===
28 January

Rank	Name	Nationality	1.55	1.60	1.65	1.70	1.73	1.76	1.79	1.82	1.85	1.87	Result	Notes
1st place, gold medalist(s)	Valdileia Martins	Brazil	–	–	–	–	o	o	xo	o	xo	xxx	1.85	CR, PB
2nd place, silver medalist(s)	María Arboleda	Colombia	–	–	–	o	o	o	o	xo	xxx		1.82	
3rd place, bronze medalist(s)	Arielly Rodrigues	Brazil	–	–	–	o	xxx						1.70	
3rd place, bronze medalist(s)	Carla Ríos	Bolivia	o	o	o	o	xxx						1.70	
	Martina Caprioglio	Bolivia	xxx										NM	

=== Pole vault ===
28 January

Rank	Name	Nationality	3.80	4.00	4.10	4.20	4.31	Result	Notes
1st place, gold medalist(s)	Beatriz Chagas	Brazil	o	o	o	xo	xxx	4.20	CR
2nd place, silver medalist(s)	Isabel de Quadros	Brazil	o	xo	xxx			4.00	

=== Long jump ===
27 January

Rank	Name	Nationality	#1	#2	#3	#4	#5	#6	Result	Notes
1st place, gold medalist(s)	Lissandra Campos	Brazil	6.19	6.31	6.31	6.16	6.49	6.45	6.49	
2nd place, silver medalist(s)	Eliane Martins	Brazil	6.36	6.38	6.41	x	6.49	x	6.49	
3rd place, bronze medalist(s)	Natalia Linares	Colombia	6.21	6.26	6.32	3.81	6.30	5.92	6.32	
4	Rocío Muñoz	Chile	6.02	5.82	6.09	x	6.14	x	6.14	
5	Valeria Quispe	Bolivia	5.99	5.89	x	5.83	–	–	5.99	
6	Paola Mautino	Peru	5.89	5.91	x	5.61	5.81	5.82	5.91	
7	Daniela Vaca	Bolivia	5.45	5.77	5.63	5.65	5.59	5.85	5.85	
8	Nathalee Aranda	Panama	5.66	5.78	x	–	x	–	5.78	

=== Triple jump ===
28 January

Rank	Name	Nationality	#1	#2	#3	#4	#5	#6	Result	Notes
1st place, gold medalist(s)	Gabriele dos Santos	Brazil	x	13.89	14.04	x	13.92	13.90	14.04	CR, PB
2nd place, silver medalist(s)	Valeria Quispe	Bolivia	x	12.82	12.82	12.72	x	x	12.82	
3rd place, bronze medalist(s)	Estrella Lobo	Colombia	12.50	12.81	12.45	12.63	12.80	12.68	12.81	
4	Rocío Muñoz	Chile	12.46	x	12.29	12.02	12.26	x	12.46	NR
5	Millie Díaz	Uruguay	11.95	12.09	x	11.96	12.41	12.42	12.42	NR
6	Daniela Vaca	Bolivia	11.30	x	11.20	11.74	x	11.50	11.74	

=== Shot put ===
27 January

Rank	Name	Nationality	#1	#2	#3	#4	#5	#6	Result	Notes
1st place, gold medalist(s)	Ivana Gallardo	Chile	16.70	17.57	16.94	17.22	17.74	x	17.74	CR, NR
2nd place, silver medalist(s)	Natalia Duco	Chile	15.94	16.29	16.36	16.25	16.37	16.63	16.63	

=== Pentathlon ===
27 January

The highest mark recorded in each event is highlighted in yellow

Rank	Athlete	Nationality	60m H	HJ	SP	LJ	800m	Points	Notes
1st place, gold medalist(s)	Raiane Procópio	Brazil	9.08	1.64	11.75	5.56	2:38.83	3624	
2nd place, silver medalist(s)	Tainara Mees	Brazil	8.68	1.61	11.87	5.89	2:53.96	3617	
3rd place, bronze medalist(s)	Ana Camila Pirelli	Paraguay	9.53	1.61	12.82	5.12	2:41.66	3410	
4	Sofia Ingold	Uruguay	9.18	1.61	9.24	5.24	2:36.00	3346	NR
5	Camila Jiménez	Bolivia	9.16	1.52	9.21	5.76	2:43.35	3311	
