= 2024 South American Indoor Championships in Athletics =

3rd South American Indoor Championships
- Dates: 27–28 January
- Host city: Cochabamba, Bolivia
- Venue: Estadio de Atletismo del Gobierno Autónomo Municipal de Cochabamba
- Level: Senior
- Events: 26
- Participation: 125 athletes from 10 nations

2024 South American Indoor Championships in Athletics was the third edition of the biennial indoor athletics competition between South American nations. As for the previous two editions, the event was held in Cochabamba, Bolivia, on 27 and 28 January at the Estadio de Atletismo del Gobierno Autónomo Municipal de Cochabamba.

== Medal summary ==
=== Men ===
Event	Gold		Silver		Bronze	
60 metres	Felipe Bardi (BRA)	6.58 CR	Aron Earl (PER)	6.76 NR	David Vivas (VEN)	6.78
400 metres	Elián Larregina (ARG)	46.37 CR NR	Lucas Vilar (BRA)	47.33	Kelvis Padrino (VEN)	47.39
800 metres	José Antonio Maita (VEN)	1:54.13	Ryan López (VEN)	1:54.56	Marco Vilca (PER)	1:55.04
1500 metres	David Ninavia (BOL)	3:56.65	Guilherme Kurtz (BRA)	4:00.38	Thiago André (BRA)	4:00.54
3000 metres	David Ninavia (BOL)	8:26.73 CR NR	Daniel Toroya (BOL)	8:37.25	Juan González (BRA)	8:45.05
60 metres hurdles	Eduardo de Deus (BRA)	7.58 =AR	Martín Sáenz (CHI)	7.66 NR	Brayan Rojas (COL)	7.74
4 × 400 metres relay	Venezuela; Javier Gómez; Julio Rodríguez; Kelvis Padrino; José Antonio Maita	3:11.41 CR	Bolivia; Mateo Bustamante; Marcelo Pérez; Ikenna Ibe-Akobi; Nery Peñaloza	3:17.98	Only two starting teams	
High jump	Fernando Ferreira (BRA)	2.21 m	Thiago Moura (BRA)	2.15 m	Carlos Layoy (ARG)	2.15 m
Pole vault	Ricardo Montes de Oca (VEN)	5.20 m	Only one classified athlete			
Long jump	Arnovis Dalmero (COL)	8.06 m	Emiliano Lasa (URU)	8.00 m NR	Lucas dos Santos (BRA)	7.92 m
Triple jump	Leodan Torrealba (VEN)	16.24 m	Geiner Moreno (COL)	16.22 m NR	Maximiliano Díaz (ARG)	16.00 m
Shot put	Darlan Romani (BRA)	21.10 m	Nazareno Sasia (ARG)	19.79 m	Welington Morais (BRA)	19.50 m
Heptathlon	José Fernando Ferreira (BRA)	5741 pts	Gerson Izaguirre (VEN)	5644 pts	Santiago Ford (CHI)	5623 pts
WR world record | AR area record | CR championship record | GR games record | NR national record | OR Olympic record | PB personal best | SB season best | WL world leading (in a given season)

=== Women ===
Event	Gold		Silver		Bronze	
60 metres	Vitória Cristina Rosa (BRA)	7.32	Laura Martínez (COL)	7.40	Anaís Hernández (CHI)	7.41
400 metres	Tiffani Marinho (BRA)	53.47	Noelia Martínez (ARG)	55.59	Tábata de Carvalho (BRA)	56.35
800 metres	María Pía Fernández (URU)	2:08.20 CR	Berdine Castillo (CHI)	2:09.76	Flávia de Lima (BRA)	2:11.34
1500 metres	Anita Poma (PER)	4:24.72 CR	María Pía Fernández (URU)	4:27.48	Benita Parra (BOL)	4:39.33
3000 metres	Benita Parra (BOL)	10:05.90	Tatiana Jahuira (BOL)	11:02.14	Only two starters	
60 metres hurdles	Ketiley Batista (BRA)	8.09 CR	Vitoria Alves (BRA)	8.55	Millie Díaz (URU)	8.82
4 × 400 metres relay	Bolivia; Cecilia Gómez; Tania Guasace; Valentina Rojas; Mariana Arce	3:52.49	Uruguay; Martina Coronato; Millie Díaz; María Pía Fernández; Sofia Ingold	4:09.39	Only two starting teams	
High jump	Valdiléia Martins (BRA)	1.85 m CR	María Arboleda (COL)	1.82 m	Carla Ríos (BOL); Arielly Monteiro (BRA)	1.70 m
Pole vault	Beatriz Chagas (BRA)	4.20 m CR	Isabel de Quadros (BRA)	4.00 m	Only two starters	
Long jump	Lissandra Campos (BRA)	6.49 m	Eliane Martins (BRA)	6.49 m	Natalia Linares (COL)	6.32 m
Triple jump	Gabriele dos Santos (BRA)	14.04 m CR	Valeria Quispe (BOL)	12.82 m	Estrella Lobo (COL)	12.81 m
Shot put	Ivana Gallardo (CHI)	17.74 m CR	Natalia Duco (CHI)	16.63 m	Only two starters	
Pentathlon	Raiane Procópio (BRA)	3624 pts	Tainara Mees (BRA)	3617 pts	Ana Camila Pirelli (PAR)	3410 pts
WR world record | AR area record | CR championship record | GR games record | NR national record | OR Olympic record | PB personal best | SB season best | WL world leading (in a given season)

== Medal table ==
The host country is highlighted in lavender blue

Rank	Nation	Gold	Silver	Bronze	Total
1	Brazil	13	7	6	26
2	Bolivia*	4	4	3	11
3	Venezuela	4	2	2	8
4	Colombia	1	3	3	7
5	Chile	1	3	2	6
6	Uruguay	1	3	1	5
7	Argentina	1	2	2	5
8	Peru	1	1	1	3
9	Paraguay	0	0	1	1
Totals (9 entries)		26	25	21	72

== Participation ==
Ten member federations participated in the championships.

- Argentina (9)
- Bolivia (35)
- Brazil (35)
- Chile (11)
- Colombia (7)
- Panama (1)
- Paraguay (4)
- Peru (8)
- Uruguay (5)
- Venezuela (10)
