= 2023 South American Championships in Athletics =

53rd South American Championships
- Dates: 28–30 July
- Host city: São Paulo, Brazil
- Venue: COTP
- Level: Senior
- Events: 45 (22 men, 22 women, 1 mixed)
- Participation: 371 athletes from 13 nations

2023 South American Championships in Athletics was the 53rd edition of the biennial athletics competition between South American nations. The event was held in São Paulo, Brazil, from 28 to 30 July at the Estádio Ícaro de Castro Melo.

== Results ==
=== Men ===
Event	Gold		Silver		Bronze	
100 metres ^{[a]}	Erik Cardoso (BRA)	9.97 CR	Ronal Longa (COL)	9.99 AU23R, AU20R, NR	Paulo André de Oliveira (BRA)	10.03
200 metres ^{[b]}	Alonso Edward (PAN)	20.30	César Almirón (PAR)	20.49	Jorge Vides (BRA)	20.59
400 metres	Anthony Zambrano (COL)	45.52	Elián Larregina (ARG)	45.63	Jhon Perlaza (COL)	45.86
800 metres	Eduardo Moreira (BRA)	1:47.12	Rafael Muñoz (CHI)	1:47.27	José Antonio Maita (VEN)	1:47.65
1500 metres	Diego Lacamoire (ARG)	3:47.99	Guilherme Kurtz (BRA)	3:48.11	Andre Carlos Sales (BRA)	3:49.24
5000 metres	Valentín Soca (URU)	13.55.42	Julian Molina (ARG)	13.55.75	Altobeli da Silva (BRA)	13.55.91
10,000 metres	Carlos Díaz (CHI)	28:57.18	Ignacio Velázquez (CHI)	29:00.91	Diego Arévalo (ECU)	29:10.79
110 metres hurdles	Eduardo de Deus (BRA)	13.59	Brayan Rojas (COL)	13.72	Martín Sáenz (CHI)	13.76
400 metres hurdles	Matheus Lima (BRA)	49.44	Bruno de Genaro (ARG)	50.35	Cristobal Muñoz (CHI)	50.89
3000 metres steeplechase	Julian Molina (ARG)	8:36.47	Carlos San Martín (COL)	8:39.23	Julio Palomino (PER)	8:48.93
4 × 100 metres relay	Brazil; Paulo André de Oliveira; Felipe Bardi; Erik Cardoso; Rodrigo do Nascimento	38.70	Paraguay; Jonathan Wolk; Misael Zalazar; Fredy Maidana; César Almirón	39.25	Venezuela; David Vivas; Rafael Vásquez; Alexis Nieves; Brayan Alamo	39.55
4 × 400 metres relay	Venezuela; Javier Gómez; Julio Rodríguez; Kelvis Padrino; José Antonio Maita	3:04:14	Brazil; Vitor Hugo dos Santos; Lucas Carvalho; Maxsuel Santana; Douglas da Silva	3:04:15	Argentina; Pedro Emmert; Bruno de Genaro; Julián Gaviola; Elián Larregina	3:05:76
20,000 metres race walk	Luis Campos (PER)	1:21:25.6	Jhonatan Amores (ECU)	1:21:42.9	Max dos Santos (BRA)	1:23.21.7
High jump	Carlos Layoy (ARG)	2.23	Fernando Ferreira (BRA)	2.21	Talles Silva (BRA)	2.13
Pole vault	Germán Chiaraviglio (ARG)	5.55	Dyander Pacho (ECU)	5.40	Ricardo Montes de Oca (VEN)	5.40 =NR
Long jump	Emiliano Lasa (URU)	8.08	Lucas dos Santos (BRA)	7.83	José Luis Mandros (PER)	7.76
Triple jump	Almir dos Santos (BRA)	17.24 CR	Geiner Moreno (COL)	16.58	Leodan Torrealba (VEN)	16.52
Shot put	Welington Morais (BRA)	20.59	Nazareno Sasia (ARG)	19.75	Willian Dourado (BRA)	19.45
Discus throw	Claudio Romero (CHI)	63.24	Juan Caicedo (ECU)	62.46	Mauricio Ortega (COL)	60.15
Hammer throw	Humberto Mansilla (CHI)	75.92 CR	Gabriel Kehr (CHI)	75.57	Joaquin Gómez (ARG)	73.77
Javelin throw	Pedro Henrique Rodrigues (BRA)	80.26	Billy Julio (COL)	78.72	Luiz Maurício da Silva (BRA)	77.17
Decathlon	José Fernando Ferreira (BRA)	8058 CR	Santiago Ford (CHI)	7845	Gerson Izaguirre (VEN)	7691

- ^{100 metres} Original gold medalist Issam Asinga, Suriname, disqualified and stripped of gold medal following a positive test for a banned substance that occurred on July 18, 2023.
- ^{200 metres} Original gold medalist Issam Asinga, Suriname, disqualified and stripped of gold medal following a positive test for a banned substance that occurred on July 18, 2023.

=== Women ===
Event	Gold		Silver		Bronze	
100 metres	Vitória Cristina Rosa (BRA)	11.17 =CR	Ángela Tenorio (ECU)	11.30	Aimara Nazareno (ECU)	11.38
200 metres	Nicole Caicedo (ECU)	22.81	Shary Vallecilla (COL)	23.07	Ana Carolina Azevedo (BRA)	23.13
400 metres	Martina Weil (CHI)	51.11 CR	Evelis Aguilar (COL)	51.41	Nicole Caicedo (ECU)	51.53
800 metres	Flávia de Lima (BRA)	2:01.82	Déborah Rodríguez (URU)	2.03.94	Berdine Castillo (CHI)	2:04.16
1500 metres	Fedra Luna (ARG)	4:14.52	July da Silva (BRA)	4:16.11	María Pía Fernández (URU)	4:16.78
5000 metres	Fedra Luna (ARG)	16.06.00	Thalia Valdivia (PER)	16:12.45	Muriel Coneo (COL)	16:20.82
10,000 metres	Luz Mery Rojas (PER)	34:25.0	Thalia Valdivia (PER)	34:26.0	Daiana Ocampo (ARG)	24:28.2
100 metres hurdles	Caroline Tomaz (BRA)	13.26	Micaela de Mello (BRA)	13.34	María Ignacia Eguiguren (CHI)	13.81
400 metres hurdles	Chayenne da Silva (BRA)	55.90	Bianca dos Santos (BRA)	57.30	Valeria Cabezas (COL)	57.31
3000 metres steeplechase	Tatiane Raquel da Silva (BRA)	9:55.73	Simone Ferraz (BRA)	9:59.44	Clara Baiocchi (ARG)	10:19.71
4 × 100 metres relay	Brazil; Ana Carolina Azevedo; Vitória Cristina Rosa; Bárbara Leôncio; Rosângela Santos	43.47	Colombia; Evelyn Rivera; Angélica Gamboa; Shary Vallecilla; Melany Bolaño	44.18	Chile; Viviana Olivares; Isidora Jiménez; Anaís Hernández; Javiera Cañas	44.40
4 × 400 metres relay	Colombia; Lina Licona; Valeria Cabezas; Jennifer Padilla; Evelis Aguilar	3:31.39	Brazil; Jainy Barreto; Julia Aparecida Ribeiro; Daysiellen Atla Dias; Tiffani Marinho	3:31.63	Chile; Poulette Cardoch; Berdine Castillo; Anaís Hernández; Martina Weil	3:35.39
20,000 metres race walk	Mary Luz Andía (PER)	1.29.07.5 AR	Paula Milena Torres (ECU)	1.33.06.1	Gabriela Muniz (BRA)	1.33.31.8
High jump	Valdiléia Martins (BRA)	1.84	María Arboleda (COL)	1.78	Jennifer Rodríguez (COL)	1.78
Pole vault	Juliana Campos (BRA)	4.60	Robeilys Peinado (VEN)	4.50	Katherine Castillo (COL)	4.20
Long jump	Eliane Martins (BRA)	6.62	Lissandra Campos (BRA)	6.32	Yuliana Angulo (ECU)	6.26
Triple jump	Gabriele dos Santos (BRA)	13.92	Estrella Lobo (COL)	13.54 PB	Adriana Chila (ECU)	13.42
Shot put	Ivana Gallardo (CHI)	17.39	Lívia Avancini (BRA)	17.04	Natalia Duco (CHI)	16.93
Discus throw ^{[a]}	Izabela da Silva (BRA)	61.26	Karen Gallardo (CHI)	59.92	Andressa de Morais (BRA)	59.37
Hammer throw	Rosa Rodríguez (VEN)	68.12	Mayra Gaviria (COL)	67.07	Ximena Zorrilla (PER)	65.92
Javelin throw	Flor Ruiz (COL)	61.82	Jucilene de Lima (BRA)	60.68	María Lucelly Murillo (COL)	59.75
Heptathlon	Martha Araújo (COL)	5785	Tamara de Sousa (BRA)	5314	María Fernanda Murillo (COL)	5229

=== Mixed ===
Event	Gold		Silver		Bronze	
4 × 400 metres relay	Colombia; Jhon Perlaza; Lina Licona; Anthony Zambrano; Evelis Aguilar	3:14.79 AR, CR	Brazil; Tiago da Silva; Julia Aparecida Ribeiro; Douglas da Silva; Jainy Barreto	3:18.02	Ecuador; Alan Minda; Anahí Suárez; Francisco Tejeda; Nicole Caicedo	3:24.42

== Medal table ==
* Host nation (Brazil)

Rank	Nation	Gold	Silver	Bronze	Total
1	Brazil*	20	14	11	45
2	Argentina	6	4	4	14
3	Colombia	5	11	8	24
4	Chile	5	5	7	17
5	Peru	3	2	3	8
6	Venezuela	2	1	5	8
7	Uruguay	2	1	1	4
8	Ecuador	1	5	6	12
9	Panama	1	0	0	1
10	Paraguay	0	2	0	2
Totals (10 entries)		45	45	45	135

== Participation ==
All 13 member federations of CONSUDATLE participated at the championships.

- Argentina (45)
- Bolivia (13)
- Brazil (81)
- Chile (48)
- Colombia (57)
- Ecuador (39)
- Guyana (1)
- Panama (9)
- Paraguay (32)
- Peru (15)
- Suriname (5)
- Uruguay (10)
- Venezuela (16)
