= María Pía Fernández =

Uruguayan middle-distance runner

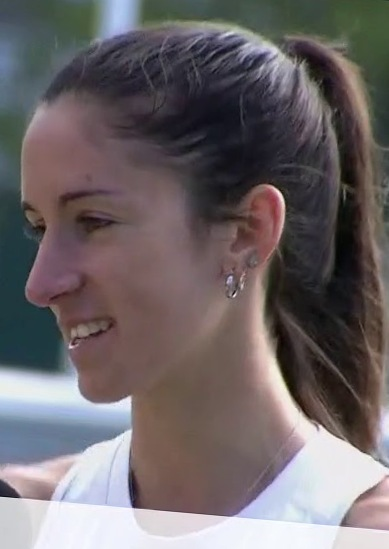
- María Pía Fernández (2019)

Personal information
- Full name: María Pía Fernández Moreira
- Born: 1 April 1995 (age 31) Trinidad, Uruguay
- Education: Escuela Universitaria de Tecnología Médica, Medicina
- Height: 1.70 m (5 ft 7 in)

Sport
- Sport: Athletics
- Event: 1500 metres

María Pía Fernández Moreira (born 1 April 1995) is a Uruguayan middle-distance runner. She has won multiple medals at regional level.

Her personal best of 4:09.45 is the current national record in the 1500 metres.

== International competitions ==
Year	Competition	Venue	Position	Event	Notes
Representing Uruguay
2012	South American Youth Championships	Mendoza, Argentina	2nd	800 m	2:13.64
2013	Pan American Junior Championships	Medellin, Colombia	4th	800 m	2:10.37
2013	Pan American Junior Championships	Medellin, Colombia	4th	1500 m	4:41.05
2013	South American Junior Championships	Resistencia, Argentina	2nd	800 m	2:14.61
2014	South American Games	Santiago, Chile	4th	800 m	2:08.62
2014	World Junior Championships	Eugene, United States	26th (h)	800 m	2:10.97
2014	South American U23 Championships	Montevideo, Uruguay	3rd	800 m	2:09.89
2014	South American U23 Championships	Montevideo, Uruguay	5th	1500 m	4:35.85
2014	South American U23 Championships	Montevideo, Uruguay	3rd	4 × 400 m relay	3:50.35
2015	South American Championships	Lima, Peru	3rd	1500 m	4:19.37
2015	Pan American Games	Toronto, Canada	11th	1500 m	4:27.17
2016	Ibero-American Championships	Rio de Janeiro, Brazil	3rd	1500 m	4:12.61
2016	South American U23 Championships	Lima, Peru	1st	800 m	2:08.83
2016	South American U23 Championships	Lima, Peru	1st	1500 m	4:24.51
2017	South American Championships	Asunción, Paraguay	4th	1500 m	4:23.50
2018	South American Games	Cochabamba, Bolivia	3rd	800 m	2:17.16
2018	South American Games	Cochabamba, Bolivia	2nd	1500 m	4:30.56
2018	Ibero-American Championships	Trujillo, Peru	2nd	1500 m	4:18.65
2018	Ibero-American Championships	Trujillo, Peru	1st	3000 m	9:16.16
2019	South American Championships	Lima, Peru	1st	1500 m	4:27.44
2019	Universiade	Naples, Italy	4th	1500 m	4:12.62
2019	Pan American Games	Lima, Peru	5th	1500 m	4:10.93
2019	World Championships	Doha, Qatar	28th (h)	1500 m	4:09.45
2020	South American Indoor Championships	Cochabamba, Bolivia	1st	1500 m	4:31.03
2020	South American Indoor Championships	Cochabamba, Bolivia	–	3000 m	DNF
2021	South American Championships	Guayaquil, Ecuador	2nd	1500 m	4:15.27
2021	Olympic Games	Tokyo, Japan	43rd (h)	1500 m	4:59.56
2022	Ibero-American Championships	La Nucía, Spain	5th	1500 m	4:17.84
2022	South American Games	Asunción, Paraguay	8th	1500 m	4:30.08
2023	South American Championships	São Paulo, Brazil	3rd	1500 m	4:16.78
2023	Pan American Games	Santiago, Chile	6th	1500 m	4:15.20
2024	South American Indoor Championships	Cochabamba, Bolivia	1st	800 m	2:08.20
2024	South American Indoor Championships	Cochabamba, Bolivia	1st	1500 m	4:27.48
2024	South American Indoor Championships	Cochabamba, Bolivia	2nd	4 × 400 m relay	4:09.39
2024	World Indoor Championships	Glasgow, United Kingdom	24th (h)	1500 m	4:17.77
2024	Ibero-American Championships	Cuiabá, Brazil	1st	1500 m	4:11.65
2024	Olympic Games	Paris, France	23rd (rep)	1500 m	4:16.46
2025	World Indoor Championships	Nanjing, China	22nd (h)	1500 m	4:21.39
2025	South American Championships	Mar del Plata, Argentina	2nd	1500 m	4:28.27
2025	World Championships	Tokyo, Japan	56th (h)	1500 m	4:28.10
2026	Ibero-American Championships	Lima, Peru	–	1500 m	DNF
2026	South American Games	Santa Fe, Argentina	9th	1500 m	4:37.72

== Personal bests ==
Outdoor

- 800 metres – 2:05.85 (Burgos 2021)
- 1500 metres – 4:09.45 (Doha 2019) NR
- 3000 metres – 9:12.80 (Kessel-Lo 2018)
- 5000 metres – 17:29.37 (Montevideo 2020)
- 10 kilometres – 35:44 (Maldonado 2020)
- 3000 metres steeplechase – 10:37.12 (Montevideo 2019)

Indoor

- 800 metres – 2:08.20 (Cochabamba 2024) NR
- 1500 metres – 4:17.77 (Glasgow 2024) NR
