= José Fernando Ferreira =

Brazilian athlete

Personal information
- Born: José Fernando Ferreira Santana; 27 March 1999 (age 27)

Sport
- Sport: Athletics
- Events: Heptathlon; Decathlon
Medal record
Representing Brazil
Men's athletics
Pan American Games
Silver medal – second place	2023 Santiago	Decathlon
South American Games
Gold medal – first place	2026 Santa Fe	Decathlon
South American Championships
Gold medal – first place	2023 São Paulo	Decathlon
Gold medal – first place	2025 Mar del Plata	Decathlon
South American Indoor Championships
Gold medal – first place	2024 Cochabamba	Heptathlon
Gold medal – first place	2025 Cochabamba	Heptathlon
Gold medal – first place	2026 Cochabamba	Heptathlon
Bronze medal – third place	2022 Cochabamba	Heptathlon
Junior Pan American Games
Gold medal – first place	2021 Cali-Valle	Decathlon
South American U23 Championships
Gold medal – first place	2021 Guayaquil	Decathlon

José Fernando Ferreira Santana (born 27 March 1999) is a Brazilian multi event athlete.

== Biography ==
He won the gold medal in the decathlon at the 2023 South American Championships in São Paulo. He competed at the 2023 World Athletics Championships in Budapest in the decathlon. He won the silver medal in the decathlon at the 2023 Pan American Games in Santiago.

He won the gold medal in the heptathlon at the 2024 South American Indoor Championships in Athletics in Bolivia.

He was selected for the 2024 Summer Olympics. He used crowd funding to help him raise funds for extra kit for the games to help him across the ten events of the decathlon. He finished in fourteenth place overall, setting a new personal best score.

He finished in sixth place overall in the heptathlon at the 2025 World Athletics Indoor Championships in Nanjing, China with a South American beat tally of 6010 points. He scored a seasons best 7927 points to place thirteenth at the 2025 World Athletics Championships in Tokyo, Japan.

Ferreira place twelfth competing in the heptathlon at the 2026 World Athletics Indoor Championships in Toruń, Poland. During the competition he was accidentally struck by the falling pole of Czech pole vault competitor David Holý as he ran the heptathlon 1000 metres, although Ferreira was able to get up and continue his race.

== Personal life ==
He was born in Pesqueira, Pernambuco. A keen follower of football, he has the nickname Balotelli.
