= Vitória Alves =

Brazilian hurdler (born 1998)

Personal information
- Nationality: Brazilian
- Born: Vitória Sena Batista Alves; 11 March 1998 (age 28)

Sport
- Sport: Athletics
- Event: Hurdles

Achievements and titles
- Personal bests: 60m hurdles: 8.08 (2026); 100m hurdles: 12.57 (2026) NR
Medal record
Representing Brazil
Women's athletics
Pan American Championships
| Gold medal – first place | 2026 Medellín | 100 m hurdles |
South American Championships
| Bronze medal – third place | 2025 Mar del Plata | 100 m hurdles |
Ibero-American Championships
| Gold medal – first place | 2026 Lima | 100 m hurdles |
South American Games
| Gold medal – first place | 2026 Santa Fe | 100 m hurdles |
South American Indoor Championships
| Silver medal – second place | 2024 Cochabamba | 60 m hurdles |
| Bronze medal – third place | 2026 Cochabamba | 60 m hurdles |

Vitória Sena Batista Alves (born 11 March 1998) is a Brazilian high hurdler. In 2026, she set a new Brazilian national record in the 100 metres hurdles and won the gold medal at the 2026 Pan American Championships.

== Biography ==
From São Paulo, Alves also studied in the United States at Kansas State University. Alves is a member of Praia Clube, in Uberlândia, Minas Gerais. Alves won the silver medal over 60 metres hurdles at the 2024 South American Indoor Championships in Cochabamba, Bolivia, behind compatriot Ketiley Batista.

Alves won the bronze medal in the 100 metres hurdles at the 2025 South American Championships in Mar del Plata.

Alves won the bronze medal at the 2026 South American Indoor Championships in Cochabamba. In March 2026, she ran in the 60 metres hurdles at the 2026 World Athletics Indoor Championships in Toruń, Poland.

Alves set a new Brazilian national record for the 100 metres hurdles, surpassing the previous best set by Maurren Maggi more than 25 years previously, with a time of 12.69 seconds on 25 April 2026. She lowered it again to 12.68 on 30 May 2026 to win the gold medal at the 2026 Ibero-American Championships in Athletics in Peru. Alves then broke the Brazilian national record again and set a new South American record on 19 June 2026, with a time of 12.57 seconds while competing at the Montgeron-Essonne International Meeting in France. That month, she ran close to her with a time of 12.59 seconds to win the gold medal in the 100 metres hurdles at the inaugural 2026 Pan American Championships in Medellín. She won the 100 metres hurdles gold medal at the 2026 South American Games.
