= Gerson Izaguirre =

Venezuelan athlete (born 1995)

Personal information
- Full name: Gerson Vidal Izaguirre Rangel
- Born: 3 August 1995 (age 31)
- Height: 1.89 m (6 ft 2 in)
- Weight: 80 kg (176 lb)

Sport
- Sport: Athletics
- Event: Decathlon

Gerson Vidal Izaguirre Rangel (born 3 August 1995) is a Venezuelan athlete competing in the combined events. He won the gold medal at the 2022 Ibero-American Championships in addition to several medals at regional level.

== International competitions ==
Year	Competition	Venue	Position	Event	Notes
Representing Venezuela
2016	Ibero-American Championships	São Paulo, Brazil	4th	Decathlon	6538 pts
2017	Bolivarian Games	Santa Marta, Colombia	5th	110 m hurdles	14.37 s
2017	Bolivarian Games	Santa Marta, Colombia	–	Pole vault	NM
2017	Bolivarian Games	Santa Marta, Colombia	9th	Long jump	7.01 m
2018	South American Games	Cochabamba, Bolivia	4th	Decathlon	7287 pts
2019	South American Championships	Lima, Peru	2nd	Decathlon	7302 pts
2019	Pan American Games	Lima, Peru	7th	Decathlon	7415 pts
2021	South American Championships	Guayaquil, Ecuador	4th	Decathlon	7586 pts
2022	Ibero-American Championships	La Nucía, Spain	1st	Decathlon	7827 pts
2022	Bolivarian Games	Valledupar, Colombia	2nd	Decathlon	7731 pts
2022	South American Games	Asunción, Paraguay	3rd	Decathlon	7424 pts
2023	Central American and Caribbean Games	San Salvador, El Salvador	6th	Decathlon	7596 pts
2023	South American Championships	São Paulo, Brazil	3rd	Decathlon	7691 pts
2023	Pan American Games	Santiago, Chile	7th	Decathlon	7271 pts
2024	South American Indoor Championships	Cochabamba, Bolivia	2nd	Heptathlon	5644 pts
2025	South American Indoor Championships	Cochabamba, Bolivia	5th	60 m hurdles	8.05 s
2025	South American Indoor Championships	Cochabamba, Bolivia	3rd	Heptathlon	5060 pts
2025	South American Championships	Mar del Plata, Argentina	5th	110 m hurdles	14.41 s
2025	South American Championships	Mar del Plata, Argentina	2nd	Decathlon	7273 pts
2025	Bolivarian Games	Lima, Peru	2nd	Decathlon	7798 pts
2026	Pan American Championships	Medellín, Colombia	6th	110 m hurdles	13.83 s
2026	Pan American Championships	Medellín, Colombia	6th	Long jump	7.17 m
2026	Central American and Caribbean Games	Santo Domingo, Dominican Republic	2nd	Decathlon	7548 pts
2026	South American Games	Santa Fe, Argentina	4th	Decathlon	6008 pts

== Personal bests ==
=== Outdoor ===
- 100 metres – 10.94 (0.0 m/s, Guayaquil 2021)
- 400 metres – 49.86 (San Salvador 2023)
- 1500 metres – 4:46.37 (La Nucía 2022)
- 110 metres hurdles – 13.74 (+1.9 m/s, Pamplona 2026)
- High jump – 2.03 (Barquisimeto 2019)
- Pole vault – 4.90 (Barinas 2021)
- Long jump – 7.41 (+1.0 m/s, Vigo 2022)
- Shot put – 14.91 (Fuerteventura 2025)
- Discus throw – 46.89 (Arona 2025)
- Javelin throw – 62.89 (Lima 2026)
- Decathlon – 7827 (La Nucía 2022)

=== Indoor ===
- 60 metres – 7.01 (Ourense 2023)
- 1000 metres – 2:54.25 (Valencia 2026)
- 60 metres hurdles – 7.85 (Ourense 2026) NR
- High jump – 1.94 (Aubiére 2023)
- Pole vault – 4.80 (Ourense 2023)
- Long jump – 7.36 (Aubiére 2023)
- Shot put – 14.27 (Aubiére 2023)
- Heptathlon – 5753 (Valencia 2026) NR
