= Athletics at the 2023 Pan American Games – Men's decathlon =

Men's decathlon at the 2023 Pan American Games
- Venue: Athletics Stadium
- Dates: October 30–31
- Competitors: 10 from 7 nations
- Winning points: 7834

Medalists
Gold medal	Santiago Ford	Chile
Silver medal	José Fernando Ferreira	Brazil
Bronze medal	Ryan Talbot	United States

The men's decathlon competition of the athletics events at the 2023 Pan American Games took place on October 30 and 31 at the Julio Martínez National Stadium of Santiago, Chile.

== Records ==
Prior to this competition, the existing world and Pan American Games records were as follows:

World record	Kevin Mayer (FRA)	9126	Talence, France	September 16, 2018
Pan American Games record	Damian Warner (CAN)	8659	Toronto, Canada	July 23, 2015

== Results ==
All times shown are in seconds.

KEY:	PR	Pan Am record	NR	National record	PB	Personal best	SB	Seasonal best	DB	Decathlon best

=== 100 metres ===
Wind:
Heat 1: -0.7 m/s, Heat 2: -1.6 m/s

Rank	Heat	Name	Nationality	Time	Points	Notes
1	2	Ken Mullings	Bahamas	10.89	885	
2	2	José Fernando Ferreira	Brazil	10.91	881	
3	2	Sam Black	United States	10.97	867	
4	2	Ryan Talbot	United States	11.02	856	
5	1	José Miguel Paulino	Dominican Republic	11.04	852	
6	1	Felipe dos Santos	Brazil	11.06	847	
7	1	Santiago Ford	Chile	11.22	812	
8	1	Gerson Izaguirre	Venezuela	11.26	804	
9	1	Andy Preciado	Ecuador	11.28	799	
10	1	Josmi Sánchez	Cuba	11.29	797	
	2	Kendrick Thompson	Bahamas	DNS	0	
	2	Esteban Ibáñez	El Salvador	DNS	0	

=== Long jump ===
Rank	Group	Name	Nationality	#1	#2	#3	Mark	Points	Notes	Total
1	A	José Miguel Paulino	Dominican Republic	7.31	x	7.54	7.54	945	SB	1797
2	A	Santiago Ford	Chile	x	7.48	x	7.48	930	SB	1742
3	B	Josmi Sánchez	Cuba	7.06	7.37	7.20	7.37	903	SB	1700
4	A	Gerson Izaguirre	Venezuela	x	7.09	7.33	7.33	893	SB	1697
5	A	Sam Black	United States	6.96	7.22w	x	7.22w	866		1733
6	B	José Fernando Ferreira	Brazil	6.91	6.91	6.97	6.97	807		1688
7	B	Ken Mullings	Bahamas	6.86	6.90	x	6.90	790		1675
8	B	Andy Preciado	Ecuador	6.54	6.73	x	6.73	750	SB	1549
9	B	Felipe dos Santos	Brazil	6.66	x	x	6.66	734		1581
10	B	Ryan Talbot	United States	6.23	6.57	6.54	6.57	713		1569

=== Shot put ===
Rank	Group	Name	Nationality	#1	#2	#3	Mark	Points	Notes	Total
1	A	Andy Preciado	Ecuador	14.50	15.89	15.23	15.89	844	SB	2393
2	B	Ryan Talbot	United States	15.14	14.80	14.55	15.14	798	SB	2367
3	A	Sam Black	United States	14.22	14.65	x	14.65	768		2501
4	A	Ken Mullings	Bahamas	14.57	14.23	13.72	14.57	763		2438
5	B	Felipe dos Santos	Brazil	13.33	13.94	14.49	14.49	758	SB	2339
6	A	José Fernando Ferreira	Brazil	13.88	13.78	14.37	14.37	751	SB	2439
7	A	Gerson Izaguirre	Venezuela	14.16	14.01	14.16	14.16	738		2435
8	B	Santiago Ford	Chile	12.43	x	14.01	14.01	729	SB	2471
9	B	José Miguel Paulino	Dominican Republic	12.89	13.18	x	13.18	678	SB	2475
10	B	Josmi Sánchez	Cuba	11.89	11.87	12.54	12.54	639	SB	2339

=== High jump ===
Rank	Group	Name	Nationality	1.77	1.80	1.83	1.86	1.89	1.92	1.95	1.98	2.01	2.04	2.07	Mark	Points	Notes	Total
1	A	Santiago Ford	Chile	–	–	–	–	–	–	o	o	o	o	xxx	2.04	840		3311
2	A	Sam Black	United States	–	–	–	–	–	o	o	o	xxo	xo	xxx	2.04	840		3341
3	B	Andy Preciado	Ecuador	–	–	–	o	–	o	–	o	xo	xxx		2.01	813	SB	3206
4	A	Ken Mullings	Bahamas	–	–	–	–	–	xxo	xxo	xo	xxo	xxx		2.01	813		3251
5	B	José Fernando Ferreira	Brazil	–	o	o	o	xxo	xo	xxo	xo	xxx			1.98	785	SB	3224
6	A	José Miguel Paulino	Dominican Republic	–	–	–	–	–	xo	xo	xxx				1.95	758		3233
7	A	Josmi Sánchez	Cuba	–	–	–	–	–	xxo	xo	xxx				1.95	758		3097
8	B	Felipe dos Santos	Brazil	–	–	o	xo	o	xxx						1.89	705		3044
8	B	Gerson Izaguirre	Venezuela	–	o	o	xo	o	xxx						1.89	705		3140
10	B	Ryan Talbot	United States	o	o	o	xxx								1.83	653		3020

=== 400 metres ===
Rank	Heat	Name	Nationality	Time	Points	Notes	Total
1	2	Ryan Talbot	United States	49.05	859		3879
2	2	José Miguel Paulino	Dominican Republic	49.70	828		4061
3	2	Sam Black	United States	49.90	819		4160
4	1	Josmi Sánchez	Cuba	50.19	806		3903
5	2	José Fernando Ferreira	Brazil	50.53	790		4014
6	1	Ken Mullings	Bahamas	50.67	784		4035
7	1	Santiago Ford	Chile	50.91	773		4084
8	1	Gerson Izaguirre	Venezuela	51.92	728		3868
9	1	Felipe dos Santos	Brazil	53.89	644		3688
10	1	Andy Preciado	Ecuador	55.21	590		3796

=== 110 metres hurdles ===
Wind:
Heat 1: 0.0 m/s, Heat 2: +0.3 m/s

Rank	Heat	Name	Nationality	Time	Points	Notes	Total
1	2	Ken Mullings	Bahamas	14.27	940		4975
2	2	José Fernando Ferreira	Brazil	14.30	936		4950
3	2	Gerson Izaguirre	Venezuela	14.52	908		4776
4	1	Santiago Ford	Chile	14.58	901		4985
5	1	Sam Black	United States	14.63	895		5055
6	1	José Miguel Paulino	Dominican Republic	14.72	884	SB	4945
7	1	Ryan Talbot	United States	15.00	850		4729
8	2	Felipe dos Santos	Brazil	15.03	846		4534
9	1	Josmi Sánchez	Cuba	15.22	823		4726
	2	Andy Preciado	Ecuador	DNS	0		DNF

=== Discus throw ===
Rank	Name	Nationality	#1	#2	#3	Mark	Points	Notes	Total
1	Ryan Talbot	United States	x	50.66	x	50.66	884	SB	5613
2	Santiago Ford	Chile	47.42	48.29	49.06	49.06	851	SB	5836
3	Sam Black	United States	42.05	x	41.52	42.05	706	SB	5761
4	Ken Mullings	Bahamas	41.51	41.64	x	41.64	698		5673
5	Felipe dos Santos	Brazil	x	x	41.54	41.54	696	SB	5230
6	Gerson Izaguirre	Venezuela	39.59	x	40.90	40.90	683		5459
7	José Miguel Paulino	Dominican Republic	x	36.05	37.72	37.72	618		5563
8	Josmi Sánchez	Cuba	36.10	36.19	x	36.19	588		5314
9	José Fernando Ferreira	Brazil	x	x	34.98	34.98	563		5513

=== Pole vault ===
Rank	Name	Nationality	3.90	4.00	4.10	4.20	4.30	4.40	4.50	4.60	4.70	4.80	4.90	5.00	Mark	Points	Notes	Total
1	José Fernando Ferreira	Brazil	–	–	–	–	–	o	–	xo	o	xxo	xo	xxx	4.90	880	=SB	6393
2	Josmi Sánchez	Cuba	–	–	–	–	xo	–	o	xo	o	xo	xxo	xxx	4.90	880		6194
3	Felipe dos Santos	Brazil	–	–	–	–	–	–	xo	–	xxo	xo	xxx		4.80	849	SB	6079
3	Ryan Talbot	United States	–	o	–	o	xxo	–	o	o	xo	xo	xxx		4.80	849	SB	6462
5	Gerson Izaguirre	Venezuela	–	–	–	–	o	–	o	xxx					4.50	760		6219
6	José Miguel Paulino	Dominican Republic	–	o	–	o	–	o	–	xxx					4.40	731		6294
7	Santiago Ford	Chile	o	o	o	xo	xxx								4.20	673	SB	6509
8	Sam Black	United States	–	xo	o	xxx									4.10	645		6406
	Ken Mullings	Bahamas	–	–	–	–	–	–	xxx						NM	0		5673

=== Javelin throw ===
Rank	Name	Nationality	#1	#2	#3	Mark	Points	Notes	Total
1	José Fernando Ferreira	Brazil	61.04	62.28	63.71	63.71	794		7187
2	Santiago Ford	Chile	63.39	63.14	62.53	63.39	789		7298
3	Ryan Talbot	United States	56.77	57.76	53.13	57.76	704		7166
4	Josmi Sánchez	Cuba	56.59	x	56.24	56.59	687		6881
5	José Miguel Paulino	Dominican Republic	49.60	56.15	x	56.15	680		6974
6	Gerson Izaguirre	Venezuela	52.98	49.24	x	52.98	633		6852
7	Felipe dos Santos	Brazil	49.23	x	–	49.23	577		6656
8	Sam Black	United States	45.30	46.68	48.64	48.64	568		6974
	Ken Mullings	Bahamas				DNS	0		DNF

=== 1500 metres ===
Rank	Name	Nationality	Time	Points	Notes
1	José Miguel Paulino	Dominican Republic	4:50.70	614	
2	Sam Black	United States	4:51.21	611	
3	Ryan Talbot	United States	4:57.14	576	
4	José Fernando Ferreira	Brazil	4:59.80	561	
5	Santiago Ford	Chile	5:04.16	536	
6	Josmi Sánchez	Cuba	5:07.80	516	
7	Gerson Izaguirre	Venezuela	5:26.04	419	
	Felipe dos Santos	Brazil	DNS	0	

=== Final standings ===
The highest mark recorded in each event is highlighted in yellow

Rank	Athlete	Nationality	100m	LJ	SP	HJ	400m	110m H	DT	PV	JT	1500m	Points	Notes
1st place, gold medalist(s)	Santiago Ford	Chile	11.22	7.48	14.01	2.04	50.91	14.58	49.06	4.20	63.39	5:04.16	7834	
2nd place, silver medalist(s)	José Fernando Ferreira	Brazil	10.91	6.97	14.37	1.98	50.53	14.30	34.98	4.90	63.71	4:59.80	7748	
3rd place, bronze medalist(s)	Ryan Talbot	United States	11.02	6.57	15.14	1.83	49.05	15.00	50.66	4.80	57.76	4:57.14	7742	
4	José Miguel Paulino	Dominican Republic	11.04	7.54	13.18	1.95	49.70	14.72	37.72	4.40	56.15	4:50.70	7588	
5	Sam Black	United States	10.97	7.22w	14.65	2.04	49.90	14.63	42.05	4.10	48.64	4:51.21	7585	
6	Josmi Sánchez	Cuba	11.29	7.37	12.54	1.95	50.19	15.22	36.19	4.90	56.59	5:07.80	7397	
7	Gerson Izaguirre	Venezuela	11.26	7.33	14.16	1.89	51.92	14.52	40.90	4.50	52.98	5:26.04	7271	
	Felipe dos Santos	Brazil	11.06	6.66	14.49	1.89	53.89	15.03	41.54	4.80	49.23	DNS	DNF	
	Ken Mullings	Bahamas	10.89	6.90	14.57	2.01	50.67	14.27	41.64	NM	DNS	–	DNF	
	Andy Preciado	Ecuador	11.28	6.73	15.89	2.01	55.21	DNS	–	–	–	–	DNF	
	Kendrick Thompson	Bahamas	DNS	–	–	–	–	–	–	–	–	–	DNS	
	Esteban Ibáñez	El Salvador	DNS	–	–	–	–	–	–	–	–	–	DNS	
