= César Almirón =

Paraguayan athlete (born 2001)

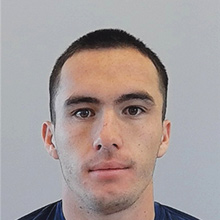
- César Almirón

Personal information
- Full name: César Almirón Escobar
- Nationality: Paraguay
- Born: 6 August 2001 (age 25)

Sport
- Sport: Athletics
- Events: 100 metres; 200 metres; 4 × 100 metres relay

Achievements and titles
- Personal bests: 100 m: 10.19 s NR (Cochabamba, 2024); 200 m: 20.41 s NR (Cochabamba, 2024); 4×100 m: 39.05 s NR (Mexico City, 2024)
Medal record
Representing Paraguay
Men's athletics
South American Games
Silver medal – second place	2022 Asunción	4×100 m relay
South American Championships
Gold medal – first place	2025 Mar del Plata	200 m
Silver medal – second place	2023 São Paulo	200 m
Silver medal – second place	2023 São Paulo	4×100 m relay
Bolivarian Games
Bronze medal – third place	2022 Valledupar	4×100 m relay
Bronze medal – third place	2025 Lima-Ayacucho	200 m

César Almirón Escobar (born 6 August 2001) is a Paraguayan sprinter. He is national record holder over 100 metres and 200 metres.

== Career ==
From Villarrica, Paraguay, he was in the youth set-up of football teams Club Libertad and Guaireña as well as running athletics. He became junior national champion in the 100 metres in 2019. As the COVID-19 pandemic limited footballing opportunities he focused on sprinting. He became Paraguayan national record holder for the 100 metres and 200 metres in 2021.

He competed in the 100 metres at the 2022 World Athletics Championships in Eugene, Oregon. He won a silver medal in the 4x100m relay at the 2022 South American Games in October 2022 in Asunción, Paraguay.

He finished third but was upgraded to a silver medal in the 200 metres at the 2023 South American Championships in São Paulo in July 2023, running 20.49 seconds behind Issam Asinga who was later docked of his gold medal for doping. At the same Championships he won a silver medal in the 4x100m relay.

In Cochabamba, Bolivia, in June 2024 he lowered his national records over 100m and 200m to 10.19 seconds and 20.41 seconds. He competed in the 200 metres at the 2024 Summer Olympics, where he was ultimately disqualified from the Repechage for lane infringement.

He competed at the 2025 World Athletics Relays in China in the Men's 4 × 100 metres relay in May 2025. In September 2025, he competed in the 200 metres at the 2025 World Championships in Tokyo, Japan.
