= Guilherme Kurtz =

Brazilian middle-distance runner (born 1994)

Personal information
- Full name: Guilherme Kurtz
- Born: August 27, 1994 (age 32) Passo Fundo, Brazil

Sport
- Sport: Athletics
- Events: 800 metres, 1500 metres
- Club: Praia Clube
- Coached by: José Florenal da Silva

Guilherme Kurtz (born 27 August 1994) is a Brazilian middle-distance runner specialising in the 1500 metres. He has won several medals at regional level.

Guilherme holds a Law degree from UFRGS and is a former student of Colégio Tiradentes da Brigada Militar de Passo Fundo, where he started his athletics training with his former professor, José Florenal da Silva. José’s guidance has been instrumental in shaping Guilherme’s athletic career from the very beginning, and the two have maintained a strong, long-standing partnership, with José Florenal remaining his coach to this day.

== International competitions ==
Year	Competition	Venue	Position	Event	Notes
Representing Brazil
2019	South American Championships	Lima, Peru	9th	800 m	1:50.40
2021	South American Championships	Guayaquil, Ecuador	4th	1500 m	3:40.66
2022	South American Indoor Championships	Cochabamba, Bolivia	3rd	800 m	1:52.71
2022	South American Indoor Championships	Cochabamba, Bolivia	3rd	1500 m	3:57.58
2022	Ibero-American Championships	La Nucia, Spain	4th	800 m	1:46.80
2022	South American Games	Asunción, Paraguay	4th	800 m	1:48.21
2022	South American Games	Asunción, Paraguay	1st	1500 m	3:41.58
2023	South American Championships	São Paulo, Brazil	6th	800 m	1:48.80
2023	South American Championships	São Paulo, Brazil	2nd	1500 m	3:48.11
2023	World Road Running Championships	Riga, Latvia	18th	Mile	4:02.75
2023	Pan American Games	Santiago, Chile	10th	1500 m	3:42.50
2024	South American Indoor Championships	Cochabamba, Bolivia	4th	1500 m	1:57.60
2024	South American Indoor Championships	Cochabamba, Bolivia	2nd	1500 m	4:00.38
2024	Ibero-American Championships	Cuiabá, Brazil	7th	1500 m	3:46.59
2024	Ibero-American Championships	Cuiabá, Brazil	4th	3000 m	8:14.73
2025	South American Championships	Mar del Plata, Argentina	2nd	1500 m	3:42.79
2026	Ibero-American Championships	Lima, Peru	6th	1500 m	3:44.12
2026	World Road Running Championships	Copenhagen, Denmark	36th	Road mile	4:04.55

== Personal bests ==
Outdoor

- 800 metres – 1:46.15 (Bragança Paulista 2023)
- 1000 metres – 2:21.39 (Poznań 2022)
- 1500 metres – 3:39.72 (Concepción del Uruguay 2022)
- One mile – 4:08.36 (Coronel 2022)
- One mile (road) – 4:02.75 (Rīga 2023) NR
- 3000 metres – 8:14.73 (Cuiabá 2024)

Indoor

- 800 metres – 1:52.71 A (Cochabamba 2022)
- 1500 metres – 3:57.58 A (Cochabamba 2022)
