= Ryan Talbot =

American athlete

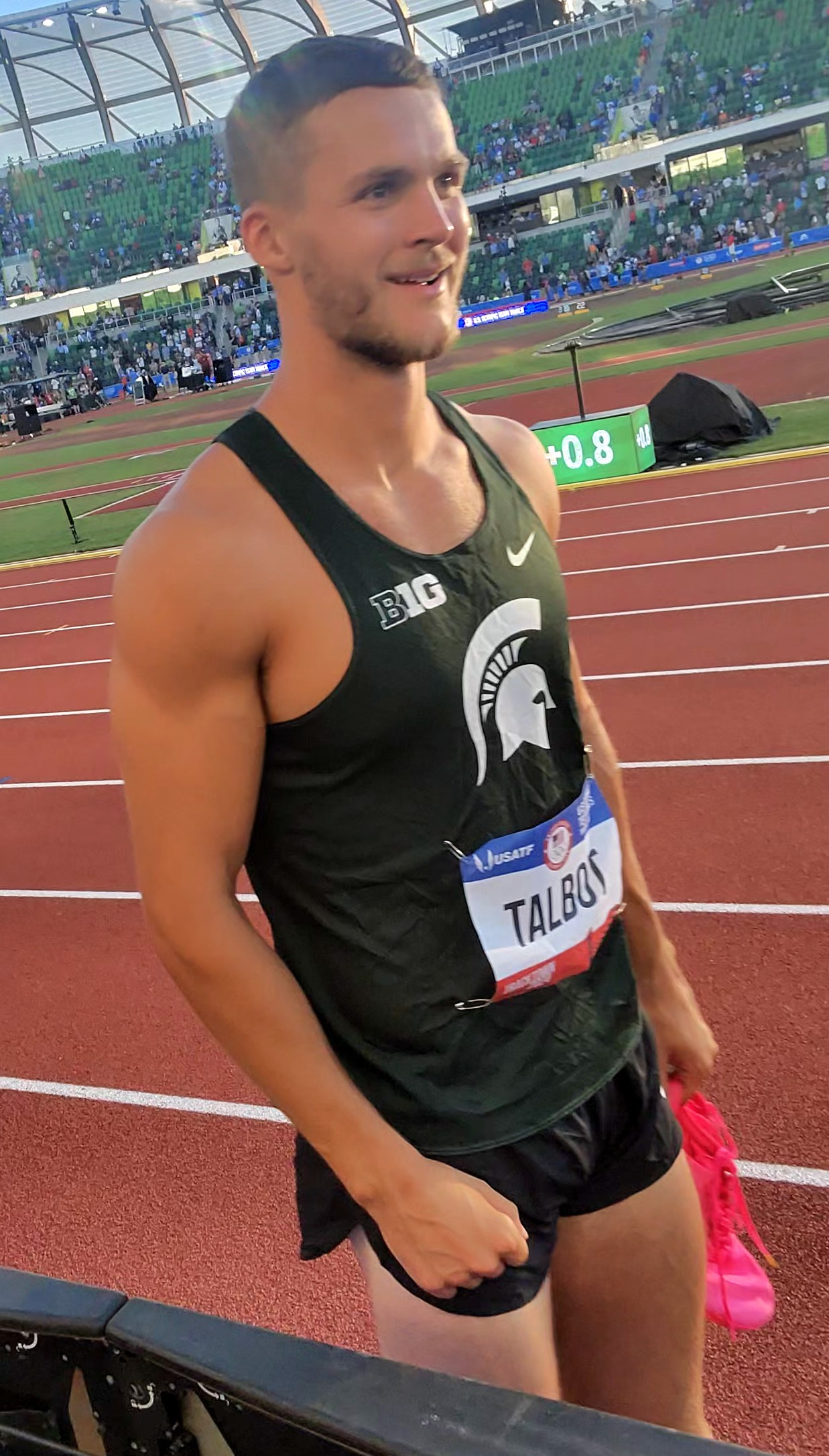
- Talbot at the 2024 United States Olympic trials

Personal information
- Nationality: United States
- Born: October 7, 2000 (age 25)

Sport
- Sport: Athletics
- Event: Decathlon

Achievements and titles
- Personal bests: Decathlon: 8064 (Minneapolis, 2022)
Medal record
Men's athletics
Representing the United States
Pan American Games
Bronze medal – third place	2023 Santiago	Decathlon

Ryan Talbot (born 7 October 2000) is an American track and field athlete who competes in the Decathlon.

== Early life ==
From Alto, Michigan, Talbot attended Forest Hills Central in Grand Rapids, Michigan. His mother, Sally Talbot (née Clark), was a Michigan State track heptathlete.

== Career ==
In May 2022, Talbot won the Big Ten Conference decathlon with a Michigan State University school record.

Talbot was selected to compete for America at the 2023 Pan American Games. He won the bronze medal in the decathlon at the event in Santiago, Chile, in November 2023.
