= Fedra Luna =

Argentine athlete

Fedra Aldana Luna Sambran
Personal information
- Nationality: Argentine
- Born: 6 July 1995 (age 31)

Sport
- Sport: Athletics
- Events: 1500m, 5000m

Achievements and titles
- Personal bests: 1500m: 4:10.98 (Castellon, 2023); 5000m: 15:41.78 (Asuncion, 2022)
Medal record
Women's athletics
Representing Argentina
South American Championships
Gold medal – first place	2023 São Paulo	1500 m
Gold medal – first place	2023 São Paulo	5000 m

Fedra Aldana Luna Sambran (born 5 July 1995) is an Argentine track and field athlete. She is a double South American champion, over 1500 metres and 5000 metres.

== Early life ==
Her family is from Buenos Aires. She was concentrating as an adolescent on swimming and studied Foreign Trade at the Argentine Chamber of Commerce. She started seriously training in athletics in August 2016 when she started with the Migueles Running Team led by Luis Migueles. She later relocated to Soria, in Spain.

== Career ==
In June 2022, she set a new national record in the 1500m, running 4:11.66 Castellon, Spain. During the 2022-23 winter season she set national indoor records for 1500m and 3,000 meters.

In June 2023, she set a new national record in the 1500m of 4:10.98, again running in Castellon. She was a double champion at the 2023 South American Games, winning both the 1500m and 5000m in 2023 in São Paulo, bookending the first and last day of the championships.

She competed in the women's 1500 metres race at the 2024 World Athletics Indoor Championships in Glasgow, running a seasons best time of 4:16.14.
