= Santiago Ford =

Chilean athlete (born 1997)

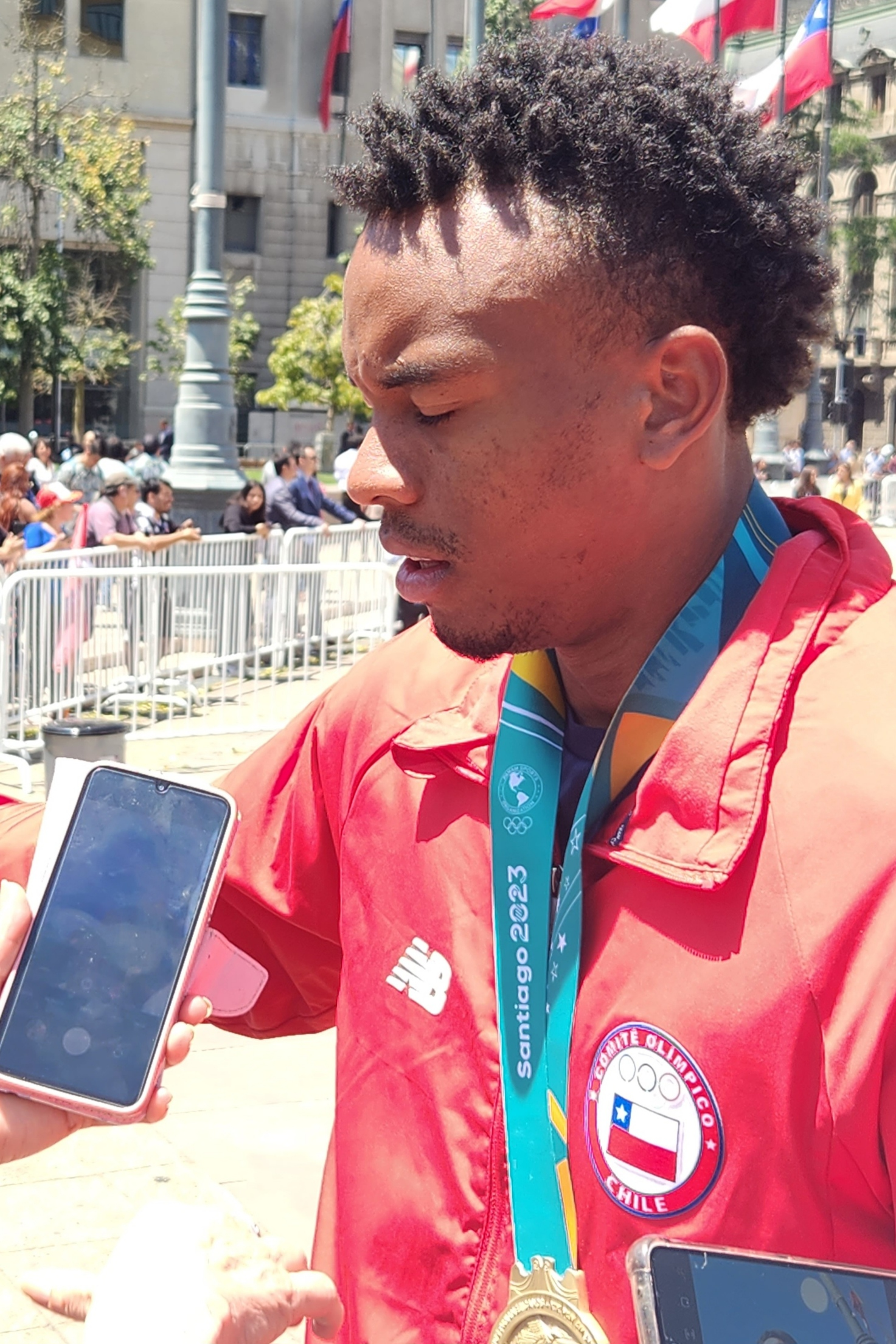
- Ford in 2023

Personal information
- Nationality: Chilean
- Born: 25 August 1997 (age 28) Cuba
- Height: 1.84 m (6 ft 0 in)
- Weight: 85 kg (187 lb)

Sport
- Sport: Athletics
- Events: Heptathlon; Decathlon

Achievements and titles
- Personal best: Decathlon: 7892 pts (Cuiabá, 2024)
Medal record
Representing Chile
Men's athletics
Pan American Games
Gold medal – first place	2023 Santiago	Decathlon
Ibero-American Championships
Silver medal – second place	2024 Cuiabá	Decathlon
South American Championships
Silver medal – second place	2023 São Paulo	Decathlon
South American Indoor Championships
Bronze medal – third place	2024 Cochabamba	Heptathlon

Santiago Aldofo Ford (born 25 August 1997) is a Chilean decathlete. He was a gold medalist at the 2023 Pan American Games.

== Early and personal life ==
Ford was born in Cuba in 1997, and moved to Chile in 2018 by unofficial means. He obtained Chilean citizenship on January 9, 2023. He based himself in La Granja, Chile.

== Career ==
Competing for Cuba, he was fourth in 2016 in the decathlon at the World Athletics U20 Championships in Bydgoszcz, Poland.

After moving from Cuba to Chile, he won the Chilean national title in the triple jump in 2021. At the 2023 South American Athletics Championship held in São Paulo, he won the silver in the decathlon event, with a new personal best score (7845). He was a gold medalist in the decathlon at the 2023 Pan American Games.
