= List of Uruguayan records in athletics =

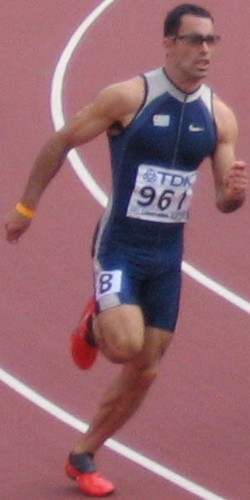
Heber Viera, 200 metres run at the 2005 Athletics World Championships in Helsinki.

The following are the national records in athletics in Uruguay maintained by its national athletics federation: Confederación Atlética del Uruguay (CAU).

== Outdoor ==
Key to tables: Awaiting ratification Record not kept by CAU Not ratified or later rescinded by CAU

=== Men ===
Event	Record	Athlete	Date	Meet	Place	Ref.	Video
100 m	10.15 (+0.9 m/s)	Heber Viera	25 June 1999	South American Championships	Bogotá, Colombia		
200 m	20.46 (+1.2 m/s)	Heber Viera	12 May 2002	Ibero-American Championships	Guatemala City, Guatemala		
400 m	45.02	Andrés Silva	17 May 2006		Fortaleza, Brazil		
800 m	1:49.16	Javier Marmo	14 June 2015	South American Championships	Lima, Peru		
1500 m	3:35.82 (Note: outdoor best; indoor mark ratified as absolute record)	Santiago Catrofe	12 June 2021		Nice, France		
Mile	4:01.98	Valentín Soca	28 April 2023	Steve Scott Invitational	Irvine, United States		
2000 m	5:08.49	Santiago Catrofe	29 July 2020		Olot, Spain		
2000 m	5:02.3+	Santiago Catrofe	16 May 2026	Shanghai Diamond League	Shaoxing/Keqiao, China		
3000 m	7:37.15	Santiago Catrofe	10 September 2023	Hanžeković Memorial	Zagreb, Croatia		
3000 m	7:29.72	Santiago Catrofe	16 May 2026	Shanghai Diamond League	Shaoxing/Keqiao, China		
Two miles	8:18.09	Santiago Catrofe	3 July 2026	Prefontaine Classic	Eugene, United States		
5000 m	12:59.26	Santiago Catrofe	20 June 2025	Meeting de Paris	Paris, France		
5 km (road)	12:57	Santiago Catrofe	16 March 2025		Lille, France		
10,000 m	28:28.49	Santiago Catrofe	20 August 2023	World Championships	Budapest, Hungary		
10 km (road)	27:16	Santiago Catrofe	12 January 2025	10K Valencia Ibercaja	Valencia, Spain		
15 km (road)	44:03+	Cristhian Zamora	27 October 2024	Valencia Half Marathon	Valencia, Spain		
20 km (road)	58:52+	Cristhian Zamora	27 October 2024	Valencia Half Marathon	Valencia, Spain		
Half marathon	1:02:03	Cristhian Zamora	27 October 2024	Valencia Half Marathon	Valencia, Spain		
25 km (road)	1:16:22+	Cristhian Zamora	1 December 2024	Valencia Marathon	Valencia, Spain		
30 km (road)	1:31:47+	Cristhian Zamora	1 December 2024	Valencia Marathon	Valencia, Spain		
Marathon	2:09:04	Cristhian Zamora	1 December 2024	Valencia Marathon	Valencia, Spain		
50 km (road)	3:12:03	Juan Llosa	26 March 2023		Mar del Plata, Argentina		
100 km (road)	7:23:17	Fernando Martínez	26 March 2023 (Note: by CAU source, 3 April 2023 by other sources)		Mar del Plata, Argentina		
110 m hurdles	14.89 NWI	Javier Olivar	27 October 1984		Santiago, Chile		
400 m hurdles	48.65	Andrés Silva	1 August 2014	Ibero-American Championships	São Paulo, Brazil		
3000 m steeplechase	8:23.02	Ricardo Vera	28 June 1992		Hengelo, Netherlands		
High jump	2.14 m	Elbio Pelloni	24 April 1988		Americana, Brazil		
Pole vault	5.00 m	Fernando Ruocco	20 June 1980		Troisdorf, West Germany		
Long jump	8.28 m (+2.0 m/s)	Emiliano Lasa	1 May 2022	Grande Premio Internacional Brasil Loterias Caixa de Atletismo	São Paulo, Brazil		
Triple jump	15.08 m (+1.2 m/s)	Emiliano Lasa	7 November 2010	Torneo International "Semana del Mar"	Mar del Plata, Argentina		
Shot put	15.54 m	Oscar Gadea	12 September 1987		Montevideo, Uruguay		
Discus throw	54.92 m	Rodolfo Casanova	14 April 2012	Torneo Darwin Piñeyrúa	San Carlos, Uruguay		
Hammer throw	63.18 m	Darwin Piñeyrúa	4 May 1974		Montevideo, Uruguay		
Javelin throw	71.96 m	Lautaro Techera	3 September 2022	Uruguayan U23 Championships	Montevideo, Uruguay		
Decathlon	6602 pts h	Sebastián Ortiz	21–22 November 1998		Montevideo, Uruguay		
Decathlon	100m (wind) / Long jump (wind) / Shot put / High jump / 400m / 110m H (wind) / Discus / Pole vault / Javelin / 1500m; 11.2 / 6.91 m / 12.24 m / 1.95 m / 53.8 / 16.4 / 36.04 m / 4.60 m / 41.05 m / 5:05.3						
10,000 m walk (track)	44:00.3	Juan Mesquita	9 February 2002		Montevideo, Uruguay		
20 km walk (road)							
50 km walk (road)							
4 × 100 m relay	40.14	Uruguay; Heber Viera; Rubén Techeira; Danielo Estefan; Daniel Sarmiento	26 June 1999	South American Championships	Bogotá, Colombia		
4 × 400 m relay	3:11.59	Uruguay; Heber Viera; Rubén Techeira; Andrés Silva; Danielo Estefan	19 May 2002		Montevideo, Uruguay		

=== Women ===
Event	Record	Athlete	Date	Meet	Place	Ref.
100 m	11.54 A (+1.7 m/s)	Claudia Acerenza	22 July 1988	Ibero-American Championships	Mexico City, Mexico	
200 m	23.78 A (±0.0 m/s)	Claudia Acerenza	23 July 1988	Ibero-American Championships	Mexico City, Mexico	
400 m	52.53	Déborah Rodríguez	3 October 2014	South American U-23 Championships	Montevideo, Uruguay	
600 m	1:25.55	Déborah Rodríguez	18 June 2024	XIX Reunión Internacional Villa de Bilbao	Bilbao, Spain	
800 m	2:00.20	Déborah Rodríguez	12 June 2021	AtletiCAGeneve	Geneva, Switzerland	
1500 m	4:09.45	María Pía Fernández	2 October 2019	World Championships	Doha, Qatar	
Mile (road)	4:45.81 Wo	María Pía Fernández	1 October 2023	World Road Running Championships	Riga, Latvia	
2000 m	5:50.21	María Pía Fernández	12 July 2024	Herculis	Fontvieille, Monaco	
3000 m	9:12.80	María Pía Fernández	4 August 2018	Meeting voor Mon	Leuven, Belgium	
5000 m	16:42.19 (Note: ratified by CAU but not recognised by World Athletics)	María Pía Fernández	4 November 2018	Uruguayan Cup	Montevideo, Uruguay	
5000 m	16:46.65	Elena Guerra	18 April 2004		Montevideo, Uruguay	
5 km (road)	16:53+	Julia Paternain	19 January 2025	Houston Half Marathon	Houston, United States	
5 km (road)	16:20 + Wo	Julia Paternain	20 September 2026	World Road Running Championships	Copenhagen, Denmark	
10,000 m	35:56.58	Lorena Sosa	6 March 2021		Montevideo, Uruguay	
10 km (road)	33:34+	Julia Paternain	19 January 2025	Houston Half Marathon	Houston, United States	
10 km (road)	32:57	Julia Paternain	1 August 2026	TD Beach to Beacon 10K Road Race	Cape Elizabeth, United States	
10 km (road)	32:57 + Wo	Julia Paternain	20 September 2026	World Road Running Championships	Copenhagen, Denmark	
15 km (road)	50:26+	Julia Paternain	19 January 2025	Houston Half Marathon	Houston, United States	
15 km (road)	50:06 + Wo	Julia Paternain	20 September 2026	World Road Running Championships	Copenhagen, Denmark	
20 km (road)	1:08:15+	Julia Paternain	19 January 2025	Houston Half Marathon	Houston, United States	
20 km (road)	1:06:59 + Wo	Julia Paternain	20 September 2026	World Road Running Championships	Copenhagen, Denmark	
Half marathon	1:12:01	Julia Paternain	19 January 2025	Houston Half Marathon	Houston, United States	
Half marathon	1:10:42 Wo	Julia Paternain	20 September 2026	World Road Running Championships	Copenhagen, Denmark	
Half marathon	1:10:16	Julia Paternain	9 November 2024	CNO Financial Indianapolis Monumental Half Marathon	Indianapolis, United States	
25 km (road)	1:25:43+	Julia Paternain	26 April 2026	London Marathon	London, United Kingdom	
30 km (road)	1:43:14+	Julia Paternain	26 April 2026	London Marathon	London, United Kingdom	
Marathon	2:25:47	Julia Paternain	26 April 2026	London Marathon	London, United Kingdom	
50 km (road)	3:45:48	Andrea Pereira	3 April 2022		Mar del Plata, Argentina	
100 km (road)	8:34:13	Andrea Pereira	27 August 2022	IAU 100 km World Championships	Bernau, Germany	
100 m hurdles	14.61 NWI	Déborah Rodríguez	8 February 2014		Buenos Aires, Argentina	
400 m hurdles	56.30	Déborah Rodríguez	23 August 2015	World Championships	Beijing, China	
3000 m steeplechase	10:37.12	María Pía Fernández	23 March 2019	Grand Prix Darwin Piñeyrúa	Montevideo, Uruguay	
High jump	1.83 m	Lorena Aires	10 March 2018	Grand Prix Darwin Piñeyrúa	Montevideo, Uruguay	
Pole vault	4.23 m	Déborah Gyurcsek	23 July 2000		Cochabamba, Bolivia	
Long jump	6.52 m (+2.0 m/s)	Mónica Falcioni	26 June 1999	South American Championships	Bogotá, Colombia	
Triple jump	13.59 m (−0.2 m/s)	Mónica Falcioni	9 May 1999 (Note: by CAU source; 8 May 1999 by World Athletics source)		Montevideo, Uruguay	
Shot put	15.85 m	Berenice da Silva	25 September 1988		Buenos Aires, Argentina	
Discus throw	48.68 m	Sofía Bausero	21 September 2019	Uruguayan U23 Championships	Montevideo, Uruguay	
Hammer throw	61.52 m	Stefania Zoryez	2 April 2006		Montevideo, Uruguay	
Javelin throw	64.17 m	Manuela Rotundo	4 April 2025	Florida Relays	Gainesville, United States	
Heptathlon	4750 pts	Ana Laura Leite	17–18 November 2012		Rosario, Argentina	
Heptathlon	100m H (wind) / High jump / Shot put / 200m (wind) / Long jump (wind) / Javelin / 800m; 15.45 (+0.2 m/s) / 1.57 m / 9.94 m / 26.19 (+0.4 m/s) / 5.55 m (±0.0 m/s) / 32.28 m / 2:27.55					
10,000 m walk (track)	1:02:08.9	Claudia Ramírez	26 October 2003		Buenos Aires, Argentina	
20 km walk (road)						
50 km walk (road)						
4 × 100 m relay	46.51	Uruguay; Marcela Tiscornia; Margarita Martirena; Soledad Acerenza; Claudia Acerenza	19 July 1992	Ibero-American Championships	Seville, Spain	
4 × 400 m relay	3:40.19	Uruguay; Ines Justet; Soledad Acerenza; Laura Abel; Claudia Acerenza	30 June 1991	South American Championships	Manaus, Brazil	

=== Mixed ===
Event	Record	Athlete	Date	Meet	Place	Ref.
4 × 400 m relay	3:38.71	Defensor Sporting; Maximiliano Rodríguez; Nazarena Filpo; Bruno Campero; Martina Bonaudi	26 March 2022	Grand Prix Darwin Piñeyrúa	Montevideo, Uruguay	
4 × 400 m relay	3:38.71	Defensor Sporting; Maximiliano Rodríguez; Martina Coronato; Kevin Barboza; Martina Bonaudi	11 February 2023	CAU Meeting	Montevideo, Uruguay	

== Indoor ==
=== Men ===
Event	Record	Athlete	Date	Meet	Place	Ref.
60 m	7.04	Jesús Carabajal	14 January 2018		Sabadell, Spain	
200 m	21.36	Heber Viera	6 March 2004	World Championships	Budapest, Hungary	
400 m	47.50	Andrés Silva	10 March 2006	World Championships	Moscow, Russia	
800 m	1:52.49 A	Jairo Moreira	1 March 2026	South American Championships	Cochabamba, Bolivia	
1500 m	3:35.50	Valentín Soca	19 February 2026	Meeting Hauts-de-France Pas-de-Calais	Liévin, France	
3000 m	7:50.03	Santiago Catrofe	20 February 2022		Sabadell, Spain	
60 m hurdles	8.59	Nahuel Laguna	13 January 2024		Montevideo, Uruguay	
High jump						
Pole vault	4.50 m	Esteban Sosa	18 January 1992		Mainz, Germany	
Pole vault	4.55 m	Juan Andres Giglio	26 January 2013	Thompson Invitational	Newark, United States	
Long jump	8.10 m A	Emiliano Lasa	20 February 2022	South American Championships	Cochabamba, Bolivia	
Triple jump						
Shot put						
Heptathlon						
Heptathlon	60m / Long jump / Shot put / High jump / 60m H / Pole vault / 1000m					
5000 m walk						
4 × 400 m relay						

=== Women ===
Event	Record	Athlete	Date	Meet	Place	Ref.
60 m	7.66	Martina Coronato	13 January 2024		Montevideo, Uruguay	
200 m	25.07	Marcela Tiscornia	10 March 1995	World Championships	Barcelona, Spain	
400 m	56.57	Claudia Acerenza	8 March 1991	World Championships	Seville, Spain	
600 m	1:29.75	Déborah Rodríguez	26 January 2019	New Balance Indoor Grand Prix	Boston, United States	
800 m	2:08.20 A	María Pia Fernández	28 January 2024	South American Championships	Cochabamba, Bolivia	
1500 m	4:17.77	María Pia Fernández	1 March 2024	World Championships	Glasgow, United Kingdom	
3000 m						
60 m hurdles	8.82 A	Millie Díaz	28 January 2024	South American Championships	Cochabamba, Bolivia	
High jump	1.79 m A	Lorena Aires	2 February 2020	South American Championships	Cochabamba, Bolivia	
Pole vault	3.95 m	Déborah Gyurcsek	8 February 2004	Reunión Internacional de Atletismo	Valencia, Spain	
Long jump	5.40 m	Ana Laura Leite	10 January 2010		Kalbach-Riedberg, Germany	
Triple jump	11.20 m	Ana Laura Leite	16 January 2010		Ludwigshafen, Germany	
Shot put						
Pentathlon	3346 pts A	Sofia Ingold	27 January 2024	South American Championships	Cochabamba, Bolivia	
Pentathlon	60m H / High jump / Shot put / Long jump / 800m; 9.18 / 1.61 m / 9.24 / 5.24 m / 2:36.00					
3000 m walk						
4 × 400 m relay	4:09.39 A	Martina Coronato; Millie Díaz; María Pía Fernández; Sofia Ingold	28 January 2024	South American Championships	Cochabamba, Bolivia	
