= Aimara Nazareno =

Ecuadorian athlete (born 2001)

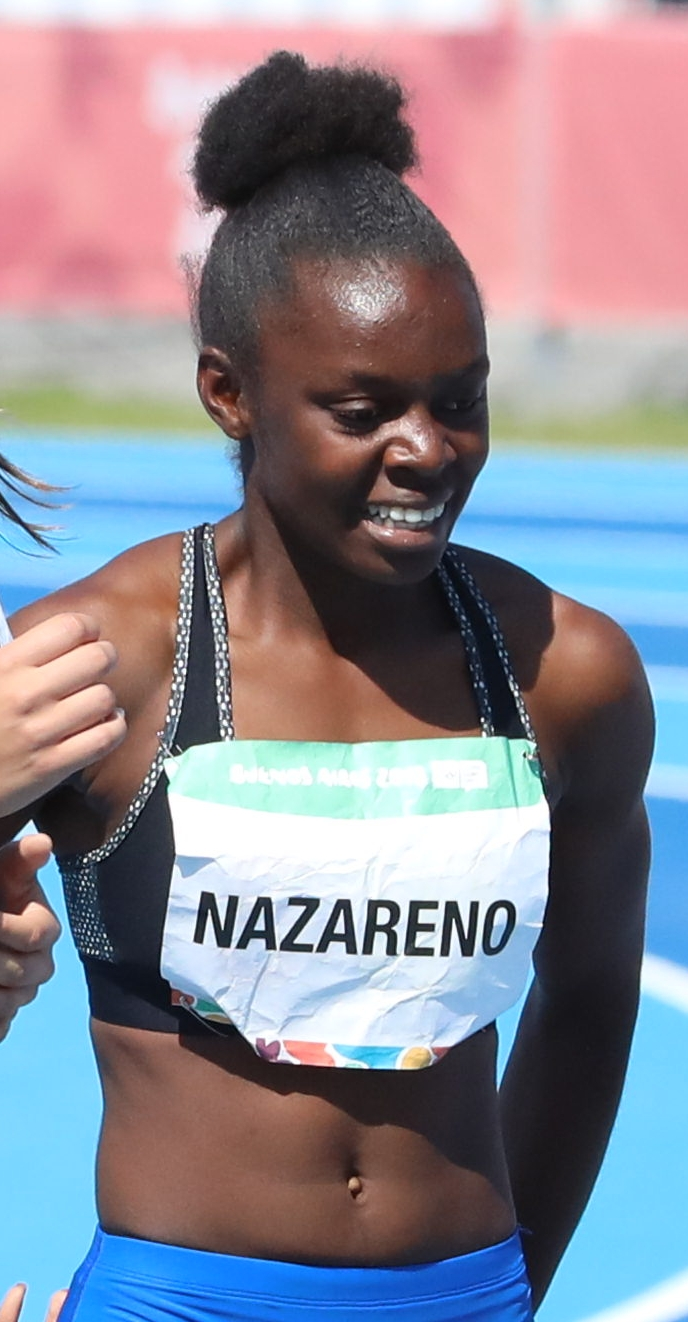

Personal information
- Full name: Aimara Nazareno Mina
- Nationality: Ecuadorian
- Born: 30 November 2001 (age 24)

Sport
- Sport: Athletics
- Event: Sprint

Achievements and titles
- Personal bests: 100m: 11.14 (Kefalonia, 2026); 200m: 22.96 (Quito, 2024)
Medal record
Women's athletics
Representing Ecuador
South American Games
Bronze medal – third place	2026 Santa Fe	100 m
South American Championships
Bronze medal – third place	2023 São Paulo	100 m
South American U23 Championships
Gold medal – first place	2022 Cascavel	4x100m relay
Silver medal – second place	2022 Cascavel	4x400m relay

Aimara Nazareno Mina (born 30 November 2001) is an Ecuadorian sprinter. In 2024, she became national champion in the 100 metres.

== Career ==
She became South American U23 champion in the 4 × 100 m relay in Cascavel in 2022. At the same event, she was a silver medalist in the 4 × 400 m relay.

She won bronze at the 2023 South American Athletics Championships in the 100 metres in São Paulo. She competed at the 2023 Pan American Games. She reached the final of the 200 metres but was disqualified for a false start.

In 2024, she became national champion in the 100 metres. She ran as part of the Ecuadorian 4 × 100 m relay team at the 2024 World Relays Championships in Nassau, Bahamas. She won gold in the 200 metres at the Ibero-American Championships in Athletics in Cuiabá, Brazil, in May 2024.

She competed at the 2024 Summer Olympics in Paris over 200 metres.
