= Lissandra Campos =

Brazilian athlete (born 2002)

Personal information
- Nationality: Brazilian
- Born: Lissandra Maysa Campos; 6 February 2002 (age 24)

Sport
- Sport: Athletics
- Event: Long jump

Achievements and titles
- Personal bests: Long jump: 6.84m (Nairobi, 2025)
Medal record
Women's athletics
Representing Brazil
South American Championships
Silver medal – second place	2023 São Paulo	Long jump
South American Indoor Championships
Gold medal – first place	2024 Cochabamba	Long jump
South American U20 Championships
Silver medal – second place	2021 Lima	Long jump

Lissandra Maysa Campos (born 6 February 2002) is a Brazilian long jumper.

== Career ==
In 2014, Campos began to train at the Vicente Lenílson Athletics Institute (IVL) with her coach Maria de Souza, who was herself an Olympic triple jump athlete at the 1996 Atlanta Olympics. Campos set a personal best of 6.69 m (-1.4) at the Adhemar Ferreira da Silva Trophy in 2023 which set an U23 Brazilian and South American record.

She won silver in the long jump at the 2023 South American Championships in Athletics in São Paulo. She competed at the 2023 World Athletics Championships in Budapest in the long jump.

She won the long jump at the 2024 South American Indoor Championships in Bolivia in January 2024. She competed at the 2024 World Athletics Indoor Championships in the long jump, held in Glasgow in March 2024.

She was runner-up in the long jump at the 2024 Ibero-American Championships in Athletics. She competed in the long jump at the 2024 Paris Olympics.

She set a new personal best and meeting record jump of 6.84 metres the Kip Keino Classic in Nairobi on 31 May 2025. In September 2025, she competed at the 2025 World Championships in Tokyo, Japan.

== Personal life ==
She is from the state of Mato Grosso in Brazil.
