= Daiana Ocampo =

Argentine long-distance runner

Personal information
- Full name: Daiana Alejandra Ocampo
- Born: 16 February 1991 (age 34)

Sport
- Country: Argentina
- Sport: Long-distance running

Daiana Alejandra Ocampo (born 16 February 1991) is an Argentine long-distance runner. In 2020, she competed in the women's half marathon at the 2020 World Athletics Half Marathon Championships held in Gdynia, Poland.
