= José Antonio Maita =

Venezuelan middle-distance runner

Personal information
- Full name: José Antonio Maita Pérez
- Nationality: Venezuela
- Born: 17 April 1998 (age 28)

Sport
- Sport: Track and Field
- Event: 800m
Medal record
Men's track and field
Representing Venezuela
Pan American Games
Gold medal – first place	2023 Santiago	800 m
South American Games
Gold medal – first place	2022 Asunción	4x400 m relay
Silver medal – second place	2022 Asunción	800 m
South American Championships
Gold medal – first place	2023 São Paulo	4x400 m relay
Bronze medal – third place	2023 São Paulo	800 m

José Antonio Maita Pérez (born 17 April 1998) is a Venezuelan middle-distance runner who specializes in the 800 metres. He won the 800m at the 2023 Pan American Games.

== Personal bests ==
Outdoor

- 400 metres – 46.02 (Caracas 2023)
- 800 metres – 1:45.69 (Santiago 2023)
