= List of South American under-20 records in athletics =

South American junior records in the sport of athletics are ratified by the Atletismo Sudamericano. Athletics records comprise the best performance of an athlete before the year of their 20th birthday. Technically, in all under 20 age divisions, the age is calculated "on December 31 of the year of competition" to avoid age group switching during a competitive season.

== Outdoor ==
=== Men ===
Key to tables: Awaiting ratification Record not kept by Atletismo Sudamericano Not ratified or later rescinded by Atletismo Sudamericano

Event	Record	Athlete	Nationality	Date	Meet	Place	Age	Ref.
100 m	9.99 (+0.8 m/s)	Ronal Longa	Colombia	28 July 2023	South American Championships	São Paulo, Brazil	19 years, 28 days	
100 m	9.89 (+0.8 m/s) (Note: later disqualified by World Athletics due to a doping offence)	Issamade Asinga	Suriname	28 July 2023	South American Championships	São Paulo, Brazil	18 years, 211 days	
200 m	20.12 (+0.8 m/s)	Renan Gallina	Brazil	18 September 2022	Brazilian U23 Championships	Cuiabá, Brazil	18 years, 187 days	
200 m	19.97 (+1.3 m/s)	Issamade Asinga	Suriname	29 April 2023	Corky/Crofoot Shootout	Lubbock, United States	18 years, 121 days	
300 m	33.57	John Valoyes	Colombia	23 April 2003		Alicante, Spain	18 years, 187 days	
400 m	44.87	Malachi Austin	Guyana	29 May 2026	NCAA Division I East First Rounds	Lexington, United States	19 years, 97 days	
800 m	1:44.3 h	Joaquim Cruz	Brazil	27 June 1981		Rio de Janeiro, Brazil	18 years, 107 days	
1000 m								
1500 m	3:40.59	Thiago André	Brazil	14 June 2014	Torneio FPA	São Paulo, Brazil	18 years, 314 days	
Mile								
3000 m	7:59.02	Thiago André	Brazil	7 May 2014	GP Caixa Sesi	Uberlândia, Brazil	18 years, 276 days	
5000 m	13:52.95	Jacinto Navarrete	Colombia	24 July 1981		Leningrad, Soviet Union	18 years, 357 days	
10,000 m	29:13.34	Daniel Ferreira do Nascimento	Brazil	9 June 2017	Troféu Brasil	São Bernardo do Campo, Brazil	18 years, 285 days	
110 m hurdles (99.0 cm)	13.15 (+0.7 m/s)	Odair Goncalves	Brazil	8 August 2026	World U20 Championships	Eugene, United States	19 years, 166 days	
110 m hurdles	13.79 A (−0.2 m/s)	Eder Antonio de Souza	Brazil	1 June 2005		Cochabamba, Bolivia		
110 m hurdles	13.72 (+1.9 m/s)	Heitor Henrique Coelho	Brazil	12 June 2016	Brazilian Junior Championships	Porto Alegre, Brazil	18 years, 298 days	
400 m hurdles	48.28	Alison dos Santos	Brazil	30 September 2019	World Championships	Doha, Qatar	19 years, 119 days	
3000 m steeplechase	8:41.55	Emerson Vettori	Brazil	20 September 1992	World Junior Championships	Seoul, South Korea		
3000 m steeplechase	8:39.45	Sergio Arezo	Uruguay	13 November 2011	Uruguayan Championships	Montevideo, Uruguay	17 years, 259 days	
High jump	2.24 m	Alfredo Deza	Peru	19 December 1998		Lima, Peru		
Pole vault	5.71 m	Germán Chiaraviglio	Argentina	19 August 2006	World Junior Championships	Beijing, China		
Long jump	8.04 m (+1.6 m/s)	Gabriel Luiz Boza	Brazil	4 September 2021	Brazil U23 Championships	Bragança Paulista, Brazil	18 years, 181 days	
Triple jump	16.72 m A	Ricardo Valiente	Peru	14 November 1987		Huancayo, Peru		
Shot put (6 kg)	20.93 m	Nelson Fernandes	Brazil	18 October 2013	South American Junior Championships	Resistencia, Argentina	18 years, 229 days	
Shot put (7.26 kg)	18.94 m	Nazareno Sasia	Argentina	5 December 2020		Concepción del Uruguay, Argentina	19 years, 335 days	
Shot put (7.26 kg)	19.67 m	Nazareno Sasia	Argentina	19 December 2020		Rosario, Argentina	19 years, 349 days	
Discus throw (1.5 kg)	63.52	Lucas Nervi	Chile	15 May 2019	World School Championships	Split, Croatia	17 years, 257 days	
Discus throw (1.75 kg)	66.35 m	Lucas Nervi	Chile	18 December 2020		Santiago, Chile	19 years, 109 days	
Discus throw (2.0 kg)	59.67 m	Mauricio Ortega	Colombia	27 November 2013	Bolivarian Games	Trujillo, Peru	19 years, 115 days	
Hammer throw (6 kg)	80.59 m A	Joaquín Gómez	Argentina	31 May 2015	South American Junior Championships	Cuenca, Ecuador		
Hammer throw (7.26 kg)	71.01 m	Humberto Mansilla	Chile	21 March 2015		Los Ángeles, Chile		
Javelin throw	79.87 m	Braian Toledo	Argentina	24 July 2012	Memorial Julio Álvarez	Manresa, Spain		
Decathlon (6-kg shot, 99-cm hurdles, 1.75-kg discus)	7762 pts A	Felipe dos Santos	Brazil	23–24 August 2013	Pan American Junior Championships	Medellín, Colombia	19 years, 25 days	
Decathlon (6-kg shot, 99-cm hurdles, 1.75-kg discus)	100m (wind) / Long jump (wind) / Shot put / High jump / 400m / 110m H (wind) / Discus / Pole vault / Javelin / 1500m; 10.65 (+1.2 m/s) / 7.36 m (+0.2 m/s) / 14.21 m / 1.99 m / 48.58 / 14.12 (+1.5 m/s) / 42.55 m / 4.10 m / 52.17 m / 4:59.23							
Decathlon (6-kg shot, 106.7-cm hurdles, 1.75-kg discus)	7641 pts	Andrés Silva	Uruguay	29–30 July 2005	Pan American Junior Championships	Windsor, Canada	19 years, 125 days	
Decathlon (6-kg shot, 106.7-cm hurdles, 1.75-kg discus)	100m (wind) / Long jump (wind) / Shot put / High jump / 400m / 110m H (wind) / Discus / Pole vault / Javelin / 1500m; 10.67 (−0.7 m/s) / 7.22 m (−0.2 m/s) / 13.39 m / 1.87 m / 46.80 / 14.5 h (−2.3 m/s) / 37.44 m / 4.40 m / 52.02 m / 4:44.90							
Decathlon (Senior implements)	7422 pts h NWI	Pedro da Silva	Brazil	10–11 August 1985		São Paulo, Brazil	18 years, 291 days	
Decathlon (Senior implements)	100m (wind) / Long jump (wind) / Shot put / High jump / 400m / 110m H (wind) / Discus / Pole vault / Javelin / 1500m; 10.9 h (NWI) / 7.25 m (NWI) / 13.85 m / 2.05 m / 50.9 h / 14.5 h (NWI) / 38.24 m / 4.50 m / 54.26 m / 5:18.1 h							
5000 m walk (track)	19:37.65	Iván Oña	Ecuador	16 August 2025	V Festival de Atletismo La Victoria	Lima, Peru	19 years, 172 days	
5 km walk (road)	20:02+	Paolo Yurivilca	Peru	3 May 2014	IAAF World Race Walking Cup	Taicang, China	18 years, 10 days	
10,000 m walk (track)	39:50.73	Jefferson Pérez	Ecuador	16 July 1993	Pan American Junior Championships	Winnipeg, Canada	19 years, 15 days	
10 km walk (road)	39:41	David Hurtado	Ecuador	15 April 2017	Ecuadorian Race Walking Championships	Sucúa, Ecuador	17 years, 359 days	
20 km walk (road)	1:21:49	Éider Arévalo	Colombia	1 April 2012	IAAF Race Walking Cup Team Trials	Eugene, United States	19 years, 23 days	
4 × 100 m relay	39.29	Leandro de Araújo; Yuri Monteiro; Renato dos Santos Junior; Rodrigo Rocha	Brazil	13 July 2012	World Junior Championships	Barcelona, Spain	19 years, 142 days	
4 × 400 m relay	3:02.84 A	Lucas Rodrigues; Bruno Benedito; Lucas Vilar; Douglas Hernandes	Brazil	21 July 2019	Pan American U20 Championships	San José, Costa Rica		

=== Women ===
Event	Record	Athlete	Nationality	Date	Meet	Place	Age	Ref.
100 m	10.99 (+0.9 m/s)	Ángela Tenorio	Ecuador	22 July 2015	Pan American Games	Toronto, Canada	19 years, 176 days	
200 m	22.84 A (−0.5 m/s)	Ángela Tenorio	Ecuador	31 May 2015	South American Junior Championships	Cuenca, Ecuador	19 years, 124 days	
300 m	39.43 A	Laura Martínez	Colombia	7 September 2018		Bogotá, Colombia	14 years, 13 days	
400 m	51.04	Kadecia Baird	Guyana	13 July 2012	World Junior Championships	Barcelona, Spain	17 years, 140 days	
800 m	2:02.59	Fabiane dos Santos	Brazil	14 May 1995		São Paulo, Brazil		
1000 m								
1500 m	4:13.53	Yessica Quispe	Peru	16 October 2004		Lima, Peru	17 years, 269 days	
Mile	4:37.35	Lily Alder	Ecuador	8 June 2025	Brooks PR Invitational	Renton, United States	17 years, 193 days	
3000 m	9:19.92	Yessica Quispe	Peru	11 September 2004		Lima, Peru	17 years, 234 days	
5000 m	16:13.76	Érika Olivera	Chile	24 March 1995	Pan American Games	Mar del Plata, Argentina	19 years, 79 days	
10,000 m	34:13.57	Érika Olivera	Chile	13 May 1995		Santiago, Chile	19 years, 129 days	
100 m hurdles	13.04 A NWI	Maribel Caicedo	Ecuador	7 April 2017	Ecuadorian Junior Championships	Quito, Ecuador	19 years, 6 days	
400 m hurdles	55.94 A	Jessica Moreira	Brazil	21 July 2019	Pan American U20 Championships	San José, Costa Rica	17 years, 247 days	
2000 m steeplechase	6:34.7 h	Sabine Heitling	Brazil	26 September 2004	South American Youth Championships	Guayaquil, Ecuador	17 years, 86 days	
3000 m steeplechase	9:53.42	Zulema Arenas	Peru	1 August 2014	Ibero-American Championships	São Paulo, Brazil	18 years, 259 days	
High jump	1.90 m A	María Fernanda Murillo	Colombia	28 April 2018	Grand Prix Ximena Restrepo	Medellín, Colombia	19 years, 97 days	
High jump	1.90 m A	María Fernanda Murillo	Colombia	5 June 2018	South American Games	Cochabamba, Bolivia	19 years, 135 days	
High jump	1.90 m	María Fernanda Murillo	Colombia	15 July 2018	World U20 Championships	Tampere, Finland	19 years, 175 days	
Pole vault	4.60 m	Robeilys Peinado	Venezuela	20 May 2015		Barquisimeto, Venezuela	17 years, 175 days	
Long jump	6.68 m (+1.8 m/s)	Natalia Linares	Colombia	2 July 2022	Bolivarian Games	Valledupar, Colombia	19 years, 180 days	
Triple jump	14.22 m (+1.0 m/s)	Núbia Soares	Brazil	12 October 2014	33rd Troféu Brasil	São Paulo, Brazil	18 years, 200 days	
Shot put	18.65 m	Natalia Duco	Chile	13 June 2008	Ibero-American Championships	Iquique, Chile	19 years, 134 days	
Discus throw	58.78 m	Rocío Comba	Argentina	3 June 2006	Argentinian Junior Championships	Córdoba, Argentina	18 years, 324 days	
Hammer throw	65.63 m A	Silennis Vargas	Venezuela	4 December 2021	Junior Pan American Games	Cali, Colombia	19 years, 253 days	
Javelin throw	58.96 m A	Juleisy Angulo	Ecuador	21 July 2019	Pan American U20 Championships	San José, Costa Rica	18 years, 200 days	
Heptathlon	5900 pts	Tamara de Sousa	Brazil	12–13 July 2012	World Junior Championships	Barcelona, Spain	18 years, 309 days	
Heptathlon	100m H (wind) / High jump / Shot put / 200m (wind) / Long jump (wind) / Javelin / 800m; 14.13 (−1.0 m/s) / 1.75 m / 13.89 m / 24.06 (−0.9 m/s) / 6.06 m (+4.4 m/s) / 42.51 m / 2:31.23							
5000 m walk	21:53.8 h	Yuli Capcha	Peru	14 May 2011	Grand Prix Internacional de Marcha	Barranco, Peru	16 years, 277 days	
5 km walk (road)	21:43+	Glenda Morejón	Ecuador	8 June 2019	Gran Premio Cantones de Marcha	A Coruña, Spain	19 years, 9 days	
5 km walk (road)	21:16	Glenda Morejón	Ecuador	15 April 2017	National Racewalking Championships	Sucúa, Ecuador	16 years, 320 days	
10,000 m walk (track)	44:12.75	Glenda Morejón	Ecuador	25 August 2018	Ibero-American Championships	Trujillo, Peru	18 years, 87 days	
10 km walk (road)	42:58+	Glenda Morejón	Ecuador	8 June 2019	Gran Premio Cantones de Marcha	A Coruña, Spain	19 years, 9 days	
20,000 m walk (track)	1:35:02.6	Gabriela Muniz	Brazil	25 April 2021		Bragança Paulista, Brazil		
20 km walk (road)	1:25:29	Glenda Morejón	Ecuador	8 June 2019	Gran Premio Cantones de Marcha	A Coruña, Spain	19 years, 9 days	
4 × 100 m relay	43.98	Ana Cláudia Lemos; Bárbara Leôncio; Franciela Krasucki; Rosângela Santos	Brazil	7 July 2007	Pan American Junior Championships	São Paulo, Brazil	18 years, 243 days	
4 × 400 m relay	3:34.52 A	Jéssica de Oliveira; Chayenne Pereira; Micaela de Melo; Maria Belo de Sena	Brazil	21 July 2019	Pan American U20 Championships	San José, Costa Rica		

=== Mixed ===
Event	Record	Athlete	Nation	Date	Meet	Place	Age	Ref.
4 × 400 m relay	3:20.79	Tishawn Easton; Akeelah Dover; Malachi Austin; Tianna Springer	Guyana	4 April 2026	CARIFTA Games	St. George's, Grenada	18 years, 133 days 16 years, 173 days 19 years, 42 days 18 years, 192 days	

== Indoor ==
=== Men ===
Event	Record	Athlete	Nationality	Date	Meet	Place	Age	Ref.
60 m	6.76	Dax Danns	Guyana	14 December 2007	Intra-Squad Meet	Lincoln, United States	19 years, 262 days	
200 m	21.28 A	Malachi Austin	Guyana	6 February 2026	New Mexico Collegiate Classic	Albuquerque, United States	18 years, 350 days	
400 m	47.32	Malachi Austin	Guyana	13 February 2026	Tyson Invitational	Fayetteville, United States	18 years, 357 days	
800 m								
1000 m								
1500 m								
3000 m								
5000 m								
60 m hurdles								
High jump								
Pole vault	5.57 m	Ricardo David Montes de Oca	Venezuela	18 January 2025	Virginia Tech Invitational	Blacksburg, United States	18 years, 118 days	
Long jump								
Triple jump								
Shot put								
Heptathlon (junior)	4978 pts	Romeo Alexander Männel	Paraguay	21 January 2024		Frankfurt, Germany	17 years, 184 days	
Heptathlon (junior)	60m / Long jump / Shot put / High jump / 60m H / Pole vault / 1000m; 7.13 / 6.46 m / 12.12 m / 1.80 m / 8.38 / 4.40 m / 3:07.47							
Heptathlon (senior)	5193 pts	Romeo Alexander Männel	Paraguay	24 January 2025	5th Annual Brant Tolsma Invitational	Blacksburg, United States	18 years, 187 days	
Heptathlon (senior)	60m / Long jump / Shot put / High jump / 60m H / Pole vault / 1000m; 7.13 / 6.77 m / 11.83 m / 1.82 m / 8.43 / 4.70 m / 3:00.46							
5000 m walk								
4 × 400 m relay								

=== Women ===
Event	Record	Athlete	Nationality	Date	Meet	Place	Age	Ref.
60 m								
200 m	23.70	Kadecia Baird	Guyana	18 January 2014	Holiday Inn Invitational	Lincoln, United States	18 years, 328 days	
400 m	53.34	Kadecia Baird	Guyana	14 February 2014	Tyson Invitational	Fayetteville, United States	18 years, 355 days	
800 m								
1500 m								
3000 m	9:15.70	Nadia Rodríguez	Argentina	1 March 2003	Spanish Championships	Valencia, Spain	19 years, 58 days	
5000 m								
60 m hurdles								
High jump								
Pole vault	4.52 m	Robeilys Peinado	Venezuela	21 February 2016	All Star Pole Vault Meet	Clermont-Ferrand, France	18 years, 87 days	
Long jump								
Triple jump								
Shot put								
Pentathlon								
Pentathlon	60m H / High jump / Shot put / Long jump / 800m							
3000 m walk								
4 × 400 m relay								
