= 2023 South American U20 Championships in Athletics =

XLV South American U20 Championships in Athletics
- Dates: 19–21 May
- Host city: Bogotá, Colombia
- Venue: El Salitre Coliseum
- Level: Junior
- Events: 45
- Participation: 13 nations

The 45th South American U20 Championships in Athletics were held at El Salitre Coliseum in Bogotá, Colombia, between 19 and 21 May.

== Medal summary ==
=== Men ===
Event	Gold		Silver		Bronze	
100 metres (+1.9 m/s)	Renan Gallina; Brazil	10.01 CR, AU23R, AU20R	Ronal Longa; Colombia	10.08 NR	Ezekiel Newton; Guyana	10.42
200 metres (–0.2 m/s)	Ezekiel Newton; Guyana	20.96	Enoc Moreno; Colombia	21.04	Tomás Mondino; Argentina	21.16
400 metres	Vinícius Galeno; Brazil	46.32	Elias dos Santos; Brazil	46.64	Dusthin Morquecho; Ecuador	47.51
800 metres	Uriel Muñoz; Argentina	1:51.56	Gabriel Porfirio; Brazil	1:52.14	Marco Túlio Silva; Brazil	1:52.71
1500 metres	Pedro Marín; Colombia	3:56.67	Uriel Muñoz; Argentina	3:59.66	Lucas Jara; Chile	4:00.25
3000 metres	Pedro Marín; Colombia	8:44.29	Luis Chávez; Peru	8:46.49	Pariona Nider; Peru	8:48.59
5000 metres	Luis Chávez; Peru	15:08.79	Elvis Companocca; Peru	15:42.47	Thomas Edison Quinahuan; Ecuador	15:47.42
110 metres hurdles (99 cm) (0.0 m/s)	José Eduardo da Silva; Brazil	13.41 CR, AU20R	Thiago dos Santos; Brazil	13.53	Egberg Espinoza; Venezuela	14.03
400 metres hurdles	Vinícius de Brito; Brazil	51.98	Egbert Espinoza; Venezuela	52.08	Ian Andrey Pata; Ecuador	52.87
3000 m steeplechase	Yeferson Guillermo Cuno; Peru	9:24.84	Wilson Steven Navarrete; Ecuador	9:26.40	Vinícius de Ameida; Brazil	10:15.94
4 × 100 m relay	Colombia; Deiner Guaitoto; Ronal Longa; Enoc Moreno; Estebán Díaz	39.77	Brazil; José Eduardo da Silva; Matheus de Barros; João Vitor de Melo; Renan Gallina	39.80	Argentina; Matías Castro; Lucas Villegas; Tomás Villegas; Tomás Mondino	40.18
4 × 400 m relay	Brazil; Samuel dos Santos; Vinícius de Brito; Vinícius Galeno; Elias dos Santos	3:11.70	Colombia; Yampol Perea; Santiago Suárez; Adrián Mendoza; Ericksson de Jesus	3:14.71	Ecuador; Dusthin Morquecho; Josué Cortez; Santiago Llerena; Ian Andrey Pata	3:14.78
10,000 m walk	Miguel Peña; Colombia	44:29.66	Jesús Ramírez; Colombia	45:40.02	Otávio Vicente; Brazil	48:52.28
High jump	Cristóbal Sahurie; Chile	2.10	Eron de Araújo; Brazil	2.08	Benjamin Aguilera; Argentina	2.06
Pole vault	Ricardo Montes de Oca; Venezuela	5.20	Aurélio de Souza; Brazil	4.90	Andreas Kreiss; Brazil	4.80
Long jump	Matheus de Barros; Brazil	7.69	Diego Bustamante; Chile	7.51	Ezequiel Sferra; Argentina	7.32
Triple jump	Santiago Theran; Colombia	15.35	Diego Bustamante; Chile	15.02	Adrian Nazareno; Ecuador	14.93
Shot put (6 kg)	Alberto dos Santos; Brazil	17.26	Erik Caicedo; Ecuador	16.43	Vítor de Souza; Brazil	16.33
Discus throw (1.75 kg)	Juan David Montaño; Colombia	55.76	Hollman Villamizar; Colombia	54.04	Alberto dos Santos; Brazil	51.20
Hammer throw (6 kg)	Jean Carlos Ortíz; Colombia	72.38	Tomas Olivera; Argentina	68.75	Cipriano Riquelme; Chile	67.09
Javelin throw	Arthur Curvo; Brazil	66.03	Yirmar Torres; Ecuador	64.64	Yuri Benites; Brazil	59.11
Decathlon (junior)	Luiz Caetano; Brazil	6855	Edgar Rosabal; Uruguay	6632	Carlos Cordoba; Venezuela	6561
WR world record | AR area record | CR championship record | GR games record | NR national record | OR Olympic record | PB personal best | SB season best | WL world leading (in a given season)

=== Women ===
Event	Gold		Silver		Bronze	
100 metres (–0.1 m/s)	Melany Bolaño; Colombia	11.53	Suellen de Sant'Anna; Brazil	11.62	Tainara Mees; Brazil	11.70
200 metres (+1.4 m/s)	Melany Bolaño; Colombia	23.43	Suellen de Sant'Anna; Brazil	23.44	Tianna Springer; Guyana	23.72
400 metres	Tianna Springer; Guyana	53.28 CR	Camille de Oliveira; Brazil	54.08	Nahomy Castro; Colombia	54.46
800 metres	Anita Poma; Peru	2:06.69	Karol Mosquera; Colombia	2:11.26	Luise Braga; Brazil	2:12.17
1500 metres	Anita Poma; Peru	4:33.15	Karol Luna; Colombia	4:38.72	Helena Valerio; Brazil	4:46.78
3000 metres	Veronica Huacasi; Peru	10:07.40	Karol Luna; Colombia	10:15.04	Luzmarina Choquepuma; Peru	10:42.52
5000 metres	Veronica Huacasi; Peru	17:31.08	Lilian Mateo; Bolivia	17:46.94	Jeidy Mora; Colombia	18:02.08
100 metres hurdles (+0.5 m/s)	Lays Silva; Brazil	13.76	Chia Ruan; Chile	13.97	Helen Bernard; Argentina	14.02
400 metres hurdles	Camille de Oliveira; Brazil	57.93	Amanda da Silva; Brazil	59.84	Helen Bernard; Argentina	1:00.11
3000 m steeplechase	Russel Cjuro; Peru	11:45.62	Laura Camargo; Colombia	11:46.11	Gabriela Tardivo; Brazil	12:05.37
4 × 100 m relay	Brazil; Larissa de Jesus; Vanessa dos Santos; Suellen de Sant'Anna; Tainara Mees	44.81	Colombia; Sofia Molina; Melany Bolaño; Yesenia Sánchez; Laura Martínez	45.09	Argentina; Sofia Ibarra; María Paz; Valentina Napolitano; Victoria Zanolli	47.52
4 × 400 m relay	Colombia; Sofia Molina; Paola Loboa; Karol Mosquera; Nahomy Castro	3:39.08	Brazil; Amanda da Silva; Camille de Oliveira; Julia Ribeiro; Maria Eduarda de Oliveira	3:42.08	Argentina; Sofia Ibarra; Juana Zuberbuhler; Helen Bernard; Renata Godoy	3:52.10
10,000 m walk	Natalia Pulido; Colombia	50:03.61	Ruby Segura; Colombia	51:36.38	Gabrielly dos Santos; Brazil	52:18.90
High jump	Hellen Tenorio; Colombia	1.80	María Arboleda; Colombia	1.78	Gabriela Araújo; Brazil	1.73
Pole vault	Carolina Scarponi; Argentina	3.50	Izabella Neves; Brazil	3.50	Josefina Brunet; Argentina	3.50
Long jump	Vanessa dos Santos; Brazil	6.20	Victoria Zanolli; Argentina	6.20	Angie Palacios; Colombia	6.09
Triple jump	Mairy Pires; Venezuela	13.35	Valery Arce; Colombia	12.94	Nerli Cantoñi; Colombia	12.43
Shot put	Taniele de Jesus; Brazil	14.46	Belsy Quiñónez; Ecuador	12.85	Mule Florencia Dupans; Argentina	12.62
Discus throw	Valentina Ulloa; Chile	47.89	Camila Flach; Brazil	47.425	Angelica Caicedo; Colombia	46.53
Hammer throw	Catalina Rodríguez; Colombia	58.17	Juliana Baigorria; Argentina	57.83	Yennifer Veroes; Venezuela	55.15
Javelin throw	Manuela Rotundo; Uruguay	56.24 CR, NR	Constanza Acevedo; Chile	41.02	Gabriella Barcellos; Brazil	40.81
Heptathlon	Renata Godoy; Argentina	5123	Tainara Mees; Brazil	5063	Julia Leite; Brazil	5011
WR world record | AR area record | CR championship record | GR games record | NR national record | OR Olympic record | PB personal best | SB season best | WL world leading (in a given season)

=== Mixed ===
Event	Gold		Silver		Bronze	
4 × 400 m relay	Brazil; Vinícius Galeno; Camille de Oliveira; Elias do Santos; Julia Ribeiro	3:22.84 CR	Colombia; Paola Loboa; Nahomy Castro; Óscar Leal; Santiago Suárez	3:25.85	Ecuador; Dusthin Morquecho; Daniela Torres; Ian Andrey Pata; Santiago Llerena	3:34.46

== Medal table ==
* Host nation (Colombia)

Rank	Nation	Gold	Silver	Bronze	Total
1	Brazil (BRA)	15	14	15	44
2	Colombia (COL)*	13	14	5	32
3	Peru (PER)	7	2	2	11
4	Argentina (ARG)	3	4	10	17
5	Chile (CHI)	2	4	2	8
6	Venezuela (VEN)	2	1	3	6
7	Guyana (GUY)	2	0	2	4
8	Uruguay (URU)	1	1	0	2
9	Ecuador (ECU)	0	4	6	10
10	Bolivia (BOL)	0	1	0	1
Totals (10 entries)		45	45	45	135
