= Natalia Linares =

Colombian athlete (born 2003)

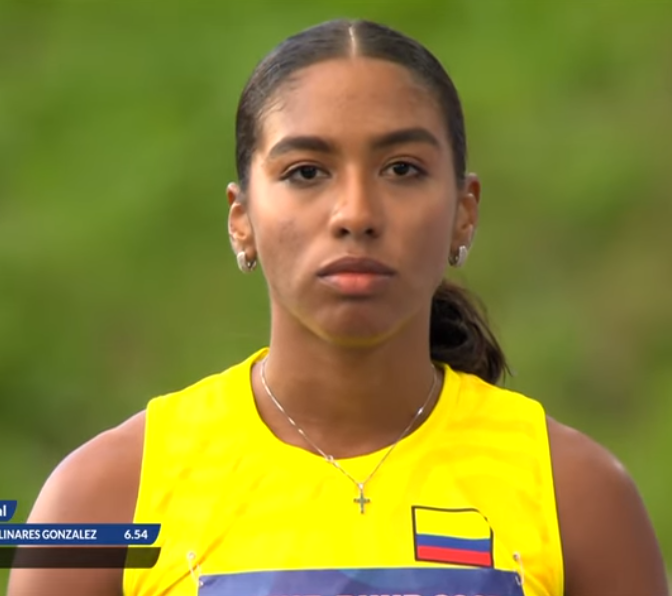
- At the 2025 Summer World University Games

Personal information
- Full name: Natalia Carolina Linares González
- Born: 3 January 2003 (age 23) Valledupar, Colombia
- Education: University of Magdalena

Sport
- Sport: Athletics
- Events: 60 metres; 100 metres; 200 metres; Long jump; 4×100 metres
- Coached by: Martín Suárez Mazenett

Achievements and titles
- Personal bests: 60 metres: 7.42 (2020); 100 metres: 11.34 (2023); 200 metres: 23.78 (2021); Long jump: 6.95 m NR, AU23R (2025); 4×100 metres: 43.59 AU23R (2021)
Medal record
Representing Colombia
Women's athletics
| Event | 1st | 2nd | 3rd |
|---|---|---|---|
| World Championships | 0 | 0 | 1 |
| World Indoor Championships | 0 | 0 | 1 |
| World U20 Championships | 0 | 1 | 0 |
| Diamond League stage | 0 | 1 | 0 |
| World University Games | 0 | 0 | 1 |
| Pan American Games | 1 | 0 | 0 |
| Ibero-American Championships | 2 | 0 | 0 |
| CAC Games | 1 | 0 | 0 |
| South American Games | 0 | 1 | 0 |
| South American Championships | 1 | 1 | 0 |
| Total | 5 | 4 | 3 |
World Championships
| Bronze medal – third place | 2025 Tokyo | Long jump |
World Indoor Championships
| Bronze medal – third place | 2026 Toruń | Long jump |
World University Games
| Bronze medal – third place | 2025 Bochum | Long jump |
Pan American Games
| Gold medal – first place | 2023 Santiago | Long jump |
Ibero-American Championships
| Gold medal – first place | 2024 Cuiabá | Long jump |
| Gold medal – first place | 2026 Lima | Long jump |
Central American and Caribbean Games
| Gold medal – first place | 2023 San Salvador | Long jump |
South American Games
| Silver medal – second place | 2022 Asunción | Long jump |
South American Championships
| Gold medal – first place | 2025 Mar del Plata | Long jump |
| Silver medal – second place | 2021 Guayaquil | 4×100 m relay |
South American Indoor Championships
| Gold medal – first place | 2020 Cochabamba | 200 m |
| Gold medal – first place | 2025 Cochabamba | Long jump |
| Gold medal – first place | 2026 Cochabamba | Long jump |
| Silver medal – second place | 2020 Cochabamba | 60 m |
| Bronze medal – third place | 2024 Cochabamba | Long jump |
Bolivarian Games
| Gold medal – first place | 2022 Valledupar | Long jump |
| Gold medal – first place | 2025 Lima-Ayacucho | Long jump |
World U20 Championships
| Silver medal – second place | 2022 Cali | Long jump |
Junior Pan American Games
| Gold medal – first place | 2021 Cali-Valle | 4×100 m relay |
| Gold medal – first place | 2025 Asunción | Long jump |
| Silver medal – second place | 2021 Cali-Valle | Long jump |
| Bronze medal – third place | 2021 Cali-Valle | 100 m |
| Bronze medal – third place | 2025 Asunción | 4×100 m relay |
South American U20 Championships
| Gold medal – first place | 2021 Lima | 100 m |
| Gold medal – first place | 2021 Lima | 4×100 m relay |
| Gold medal – first place | 2021 Lima | Long jump |

Natalia Carolina Linares González (born 3 January 2003) is a Colombian track and field athlete and South American record holder in the long jump, which she set winning the bronze medal at the 2025 World Athletics Championships. She also won the bronze medal the following year at the 2026 World Indoor Championships. Previously, she was a gold medalist at the 2023 Pan American Games and 2025 South American Championships and is a three-time champion at the South American Indoor Championships in Athletics.

== Early life ==
The daughter of Yanelis Gonzales, Linares attended the Gimnasio del Norte school in Valledupar, Colombia. By 2023, she had moved to Santa Marta where she trains alongside Arnovis Dalmero under Martin Suarez. She studied at the University of Magdalena.

== Career ==
Linares won the silver medal in the South American Games in Asunción in 2022 and also win silver at the World Athletics U20 Championships in Cali in 2022. That year, she won the long jump at the 2022 Bolivarian Games, setting a new Colombian U23 (and U20) national record of 6.79 metres.

Linares won a gold medal in the long jump at the 2023 Central American and Caribbean Games, setting a personal best distance of 6.86 meters. In August 2023, she competed at the 2023 World Athletics Championships in Budapest.

She won a gold medal at the 2023 Pan American Games in Santiago, jumping 6.66 metres.

She was selected for the women's long jump at the 2024 World Athletics Indoor Championships in Glasgow where she finished in twelfth place. She ran as part of the Colombian 4 × 100 m relay team at the 2024 World Relays Championships in Nassau. She competed in the long jump at the 2024 Paris Olympics.

She won the bronze medal at the 2025 Summer World University Games in Bochum, Germany. In September 2025, she won the bronze medal at the 2025 World Championships in Tokyo, Japan, setting a new South American record of 6.92 metres.

Competing at the 2026 South American Indoor Championships, Linares won the gold medal in the long jump and set a championship record and national indoor best of 6.73m. In March, she jumped 6.80 metres to win the bronze medal at the 2026 World Athletics Indoor Championships in Toruń, Poland. In May, she won the long jump at the 2026 Ibero-American Championships in Athletics in Peru.

== International competitions ==
| Year | Competition | Venue | Position | Event | Result |
Representing Colombia
| 2019 | South American U20 Championships | Cali, Colombia | 7th | Long jump | 5.43 m |
| 2020 | South American Indoor Championships | Cochabamba, Bolivia | 2nd | 60 m | 7.42 s NR |
| 2020 | South American Indoor Championships | Cochabamba, Bolivia | 1st | 200 m | 24.19 s CR |
| 2021 | South American Championships | Guayaquil, Ecuador | 4th | 100 m | 11.55 s |
| 2021 | South American Championships | Guayaquil, Ecuador | 2nd | 4 × 100 m relay | 45.61 s |
| 2021 | South American Championships | Guayaquil, Ecuador | 4th | Long jump | 6.33 m |
| 2021 | South American U20 Championships | Lima, Peru | 1st | 100 m | 11.68 s |
| 2021 | South American U20 Championships | Lima, Peru | 1st | 4 × 100 m relay | 46.35 s |
| 2021 | South American U20 Championships | Lima, Peru | 1st | Long jump | 6.14 m |
| 2021 | World U20 Championships | Nairobi, Kenya | 12th | Long jump | 5.66 m |
| 2021 | Junior Pan American Games (U23) | Cali, Colombia | 3rd | 100 m | 11.60 s |
| 2021 | Junior Pan American Games (U23) | Cali, Colombia | 1st | 4 × 100 m relay | 43.59 s AU23R |
| 2021 | Junior Pan American Games (U23) | Cali, Colombia | 2nd | Long jump | 6.27 m |
| 2022 | Bolivarian Games | Valledupar, Colombia | 1st | Long jump | 6.68 m GR, AU20R |
| 2022 | World U20 Championships | Cali, Colombia | 2nd | Long jump | 6.59 m |
| 2022 | South American Games | Asunción Paraguay | 2nd | Long jump | 6.43 m |
| 2023 | Central American and Caribbean Games | San Salvador, El Salvador | 1st | Long jump | 6.86 m GR, AU23R |
| 2023 | South American Championships | São Paulo, Brazil | 4th | 100 m | 11.43 s |
| 2023 | World Championships | Budapest, Hungary | 25th (q) | Long jump | 6.38 m |
| 2023 | Pan American Games | Santiago, Chile | 6th | 4 × 100 m relay | 44.79 s |
| 2023 | Pan American Games | Santiago, Chile | 1st | Long jump | 6.66 m |
| 2024 | South American Indoor Championships | Cochabamba, Bolivia | 3rd | Long jump | 6.32 m |
| 2024 | World Indoor Championships | Glasgow, United Kingdom | 12th | Long jump | 6.33 m |
| 2024 | World Relays | Nassau, Bahamas | 14th (r) | 4 × 100 m relay | 43.92 s |
| 2024 | Ibero-American Championships | Cuiabá, Brazil | 1st | Long jump | 6.82 m |
| 2024 | Meeting de Paris | Paris, France | 6th | Long jump | 6.62 m |
| 2024 | Olympic Games | Paris, France | 22nd (q) | Long jump | 6.40 m |
| 2025 | South American Indoor Championships | Cochabamba, Bolivia | 1st | Long jump | 6.64 m CR, NR |
| 2025 | South American Championships | Mar del Plata, Argentina | 1st | Long jump | 6.81 m w |
| 2025 | World University Games | Bochum, Germany | 3rd | Long jump | 6.67 m |
| 2025 | Junior Pan American Games (U23) | Asunción, Paraguay | 3rd | 4 × 100 m relay | 44.01 s |
| 2025 | Junior Pan American Games (U23) | Asunción, Paraguay | 1st | Long jump | 6.92 m JPR, AU23R |
| 2025 | World Championships | Tokyo, Japan | 3rd | Long jump | 6.92 m =AU23R |
| 2025 | Bolivarian Games | Lima, Peru | 1st | Long jump | 6.95 m GR, NR, AU23R |
| 2026 | South American Indoor Championships | Cochabamba, Bolivia | 1st | Long jump | 6.73 m CR, NR |
| 2026 | World Indoor Championships | Toruń, Poland | 3rd | Long jump | 6.80 m NR |
| 2026 | Shanghai Diamond League | Shaoxing, China | 2nd | Long jump | 6.78 m |
| 2026 | Ibero-American Championships | Lima, Peru | 1st | Long jump | 6.67 m w |
