= Athletics at the 2018 Summer Youth Olympics – Boys' shot put =

Boys' shot put at the III Summer Youth Olympic Games
- Venue: Parque Polideportivo Roca
- Date: 12 October and 15 October 2018
- Competitors: 15 from 15 nations

Medalists
1st place, gold medalist(s)		Nazareno Sasia	Argentina
2nd place, silver medalist(s)		Xing Jialiang	China
3rd place, bronze medalist(s)		Carmelo Alessandro Musci	Italy

The boys' shot put competition at the 2018 Summer Youth Olympics was held on 12 and 15 October, at the Parque Polideportivo Roca.

== Schedule ==
All times are in local time (UTC-3).

Date	Time	Round
12 October 2018	14:45	Stage 1
15 October 2018	14:00	Stage 2

== Results ==
=== Stage 1 ===
Rank	Athlete	Nation	1	2	3	4	Result	Notes
1	Nazareno Sasia	Argentina	21.58	21.05	20.96	21.94	21.94	AYR
2	Aliaksei Aleksandrovich	Belarus	20.73	20.82	x	21.22	21.22	PB
3	Xing Jialiang	China	20.70	20.26	20.85	x	20.85	PB
4	Carmelo Alessandro Musci	Italy	20.67	x	20.18	20.01	20.67	
5	István Fekete	Hungary	18.78	x	18.29	17.46	18.78	PB
6	Niesterle Alejand Castillo Castillo	Cuba	18.66	18.59	18.14	18.29	18.66	
7	Piotr Goździewicz	Poland	18.64	x	x	x	18.64	
8	Hsueh Mao-hung	Chinese Taipei	18.63	18.47	17.99	18.28	18.63	
9	Muhamet Ramadani	Kosovo	17.89	18.53	x	x	18.53	PB
10	Lucas Woodhall	Canada	18.01	18.50	18.22	x	18.50	
11	Mohamed Osama Mohamed	Egypt	17.81	17.87	x	18.19	18.19	
12	Melih Yersel	Turkey	16.85	16.99	17.64	17.23	17.64	
13	Lohan Potgieter	South Africa	16.07	x	17.35	17.17	17.35	
14	Dominykas Čepys	Lithuania	17.04	x	17.34	x	17.34	
15	Jose Manuel López Soto	Mexico	16.36	16.94	16.99	17.13	17.13	

=== Stage 2 ===
Rank	Athlete	Nation	1	2	3	4	Result	Notes
1	Nazareno Sasia	Argentina	21.10	20.41	21.22	21.25	21.25	
2	Xing Jialiang	China	20.75	x	20.89	20.45	20.89	PB
3	Carmelo Alessandro Musci	Italy	20.76	20.46	x	x	20.76	
4	Aliaksei Aleksandrovich	Belarus	x	x	20.02	x	20.02	
5	Piotr Goździewicz	Poland	17.48	18.75	18.60	19.02	19.02	
6	Hsueh Mao-hung	Chinese Taipei	18.46	18.29	18.78	x	18.78	
7	Niesterle Alejand Castillo Castillo	Cuba	18.54	x	x	18.42	18.54	
8	Lucas Woodhall	Canada	x	18.48	x	x	118.48	
9	Mohamed Osama Mohamed	Egypt	17.98	x	x	17.66	17.98	
10	Dominykas Čepys	Lithuania	x	16.74	17.66	17.97	17.97	
11	István Fekete	Hungary	17.05	x	17.03	17.43	17.43	
12	Jose Manuel López Soto	Mexico	x	17.20	x	x	17.20	
13	Melih Yersel	Turkey	16.12	16.59	16.84	17.06	17.06	
14	Lohan Potgieter	South Africa	x	x	16.52	x	16.52	
15	Muhamet Ramadani	Kosovo	16.48	x	x	16.24	16.48	

=== Final placing ===
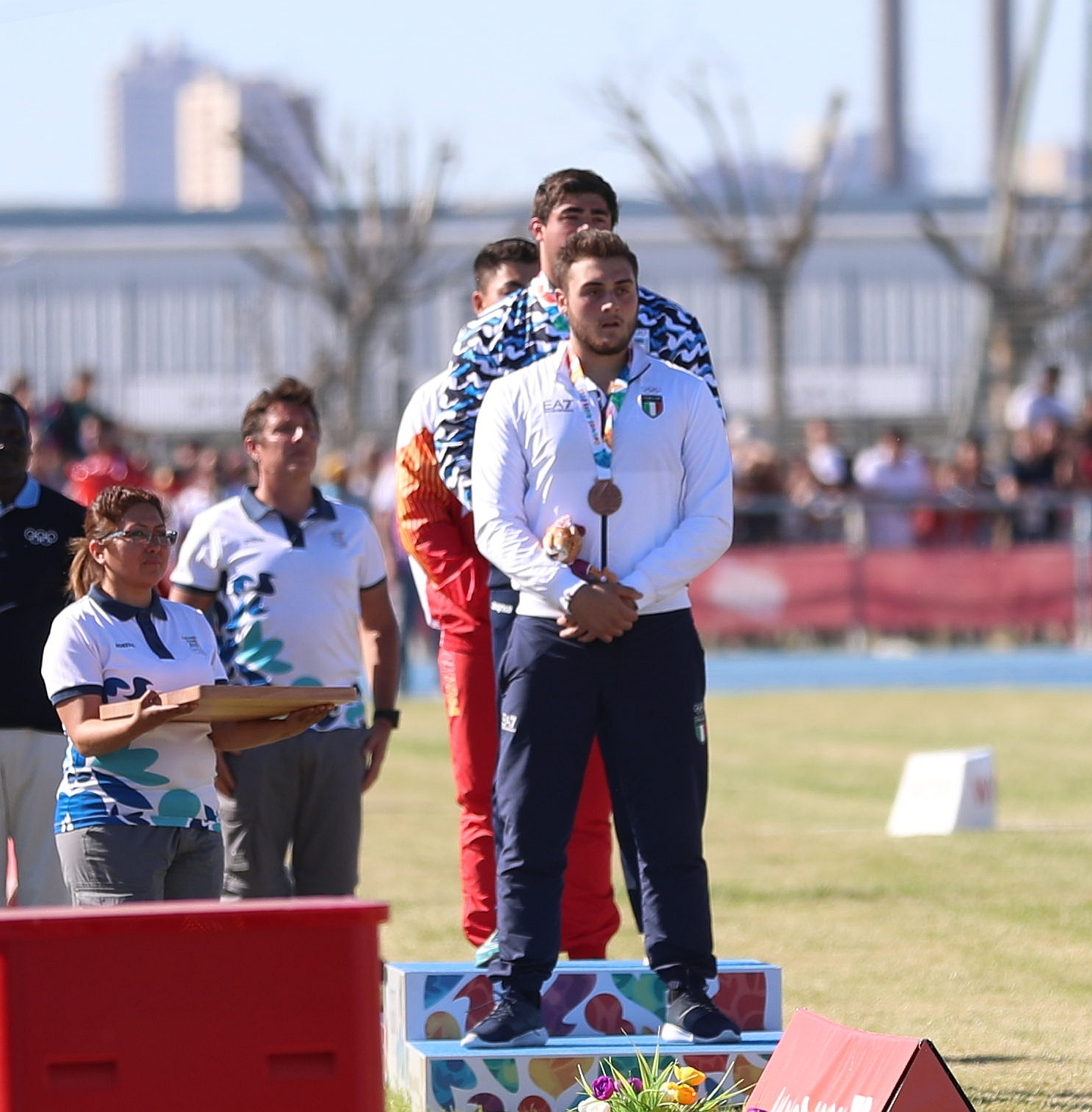
Victory ceremony Boys' shot put

Rank	Athlete	Nation	Stage 1	Stage 2	Total
1st place, gold medalist(s)	Nazareno Sasia	Argentina	21.94	21.25	43.19
2nd place, silver medalist(s)	Xing Jialiang	China	20.85	20.89	41.74
3rd place, bronze medalist(s)	Carmelo Alessandro Musci	Italy	20.67	20.76	41.43
4	Aliaksei Aleksandrovich	Belarus	21.22	20.02	41.24
5	Piotr Goździewicz	Poland	18.64	19.02	37.66
6	Hsueh Mao-hung	Chinese Taipei	18.63	18.78	37.41
7	Niesterle Alejand Castillo Castillo	Cuba	18.66	18.54	37.20
8	Lucas Woodhall	Canada	18.50	18.48	36.98
9	István Fekete	Hungary	18.78	17.43	36.21
10	Mohamed Osama Mohamed	Egypt	18.19	17.98	36.17
11	Dominykas Čepys	Lithuania	17.34	17.97	35.31
12	Muhamet Ramadani	Kosovo	18.53	16.48	35.01
13	Melih Yersel	Turkey	17.64	17.06	34.70
14	Jose Manuel López Soto	Mexico	17.13	17.20	34.33
15	Lohan Potgieter	South Africa	17.35	16.52	33.87
