= 2001 South American Junior Championships in Athletics =

XXXIII South American Junior Championships in Athletics
- Dates: October 11–13
- Host city: Santa Fe, Argentina
- Venue: Centro de Alto Rendimiento Deportivo Pedro Candioti
- Level: Junior
- Events: 44
- Participation: about 265 athletes from 13 nations

The 33rd South American Junior Championships in Athletics were held in Santa Fe, Argentina at the Centro de Alto Rendimiento Deportivo Pedro Candioti from October 11–13, 2001. The combined events and walks were held in conjunction with the Pan American Junior Championships that took place at the same site from October 18–20, 2001.

== Participation (unofficial) ==
Detailed result lists can be found on the "World Junior Athletics History" website. An unofficial count yields the number of about 265 athletes from about 13 countries: Argentina (61). Bolivia (8), Brazil (67), Chile (37), Colombia (19), Ecuador (11), Guyana (2), Panama (2), Paraguay (12), Peru (6), Suriname (2), Uruguay (10), Venezuela (28).

== Medal summary ==
Medal winners are published for men and women Complete results can be found on the "World Junior Athletics History" website.

=== Men ===
| Event | Gold | | Silver | | Bronze | |
|---|---|---|---|---|---|---|
| 100 metres | Bruno Campos (BRA) | 10.62 | Bruno Pacheco (BRA) | 10.76 | Pablo Del Valle (ARG) | 10.95 |
| 200 metres | Bruno Pacheco (BRA) | 21.26 | Pablo Del Valle (ARG) | 21.45 | Bruno Campos (BRA) | 21.62 |
| 400 metres | Simoncito Silvera (VEN) | 46.54 | John Valoyes (COL) | 46.96 | Luís Ambrósio (BRA) | 47.43 |
| 800 metres | Simoncito Silvera (VEN) | 1:48.53 | Fabiano Peçanha (BRA) | 1:48.90 | Thiago Chyaromont (BRA) | 1:50.27 |
| 1500 metres | Fabiano Peçanha (BRA) | 3:52.21 | José Manuel González (VEN) | 3:52.80 | Bayron Piedra (ECU) | 3:52.91 |
| 5000 metres | Fernando Fernandes (BRA) | 14:30.56 | Franck de Almeida (BRA) | 14:32.40 | Miguel Bárzola (ARG) | 14:38.50 |
| 10,000 metres | Franck de Almeida (BRA) | 30:28.73 | Miguel Bárzola (ARG) | 31:07.09 | Cláudio da Cruz (BRA) | 31:49.55 |
| 3000 metres steeplechase | Mariano Mastromarino (ARG) | 8:54.51 | Fernando Fernandes (BRA) | 8:54.94 | Sergio Lobos (CHI) | 9:17.55 |
| 110 metres hurdles | Thiago Dias (BRA) | 14.39 | Marleán Reyna (VEN) | 14.68 | Marcius de Almeida (BRA) | 14.79 |
| 400 metres hurdles | Denis de Santana (BRA) | 52.34 | Tiago Bueno (BRA) | 52.61 | José Ferrín (ECU) | 53.02 |
| High jump | Santiago Guerci (ARG) | 2.09 | Fábio Baptista (BRA) | 2.09 | Gerardo Canale (ARG) | 2.06 |
| Pole vault | José Francisco Nava (CHI) | 4.90 | Jorge Naranjo (CHI) | 4.90 | Fábio da Silva (BRA) | 4.80 |
| Long jump | Thiago Dias (BRA) | 7.43w | Jefferson Sabino (BRA) | 7.25w | Cristián Lyon (CHI) | 7.07w |
| Triple jump | Jefferson Sabino (BRA) | 15.56 | Felipe Moreno (COL) | 14.94 | Diego Hunt (ARG) | 14.40 |
| Shot put | Gustavo de Mendonça (BRA) | 16.81 | Edmundo Martínez (VEN) | 16.67 | Ezequiel Vicente (ARG) | 16.07 |
| Discus throw | Germán Lauro (ARG) | 51.68 | Héctor Hurtado (VEN) | 50.42 | Gustavo de Mendonça (BRA) | 50.07 |
| Hammer throw | Fabián Di Paolo (ARG) | 63.97 | Lucas Andino (ARG) | 60.64 | Roberto Sáez (CHI) | 59.83 |
| Javelin throw | Alexon Maximiano (BRA) | 71.31 | Dayron Márquez (COL) | 67.35 | Pablo Alfano (ARG) | 66.39 |
| Decathlon | Ivan da Silva (BRA) | 7107 | André Salvino (BRA) | 6282 | Fernando Martín (ARG) | 5534 |
| 10,000 metres track walk | Andrés Chocho (ECU) | 43:58.89 | Rafael dos Anjos Duarte (BRA) | 44:08.41 | Víctor Marín (PER) | 47:46.53 |
| 4 × 100 metres relay | Brazil; Marcius de Almeida; Bruno Campos; Basilio de Morais; Bruno Pacheco | 40.17 | Argentina; Diego Morán; Matias López; Matías Galardi; Pablo Del Valle | 41.50 | Chile; Iván Sandoval; Alfredo Jalón; Sebastián Martínez; Pablo Colville | 41.82 |
| 4 × 400 metres relay | Brazil; Marcius de Almeida; Thiago Chyaromont; Denis de Santana; Luís Ambrósio | 3:08.45 | Venezuela; José Acevedo; Olwin Granados; Luis Luna; Simoncito Silvera | 3:09.91 | Argentina; Matias Schmidt; José Pignataro; Ángel Ojeda; Ariel Pallero | 3:16.55 |

=== Women ===
| Event | Gold | | Silver | | Bronze | |
|---|---|---|---|---|---|---|
| 100 metres | Thatiana Regina Ignácio (BRA) | 11.64 | Melisa Murillo (COL) | 12.03 | Evelyn dos Santos (BRA) | 12.04 |
| 200 metres | Norma González (COL) | 23.67 | Thatiana Regina Ignácio (BRA) | 24.33 | Melisa Murillo (COL) | 24.37 |
| 400 metres | Norma González (COL) | 54.06 | Joyce Prieto (BRA) | 55.29 | Amanda Dias (BRA) | 55.56 |
| 800 metres | Juliana de Azevedo (BRA) | 2:08.84 | Jenny Mejías (VEN) | 2:11.38 | Kamila Govorcín (CHI) | 2:12.62 |
| 1500 metres | Juliana de Azevedo (BRA) | 4:42.84 | Evelyn Guerra (PAN) | 4:43.42 | Fabiana de Jesus (BRA) | 4:46.03 |
| 3000 metres | Eliane Pereira (BRA) | 10:12.75 | Evelyn Guerra (PAN) | 10:12.84 | Inés Melchor (PER) | 10:12.99 |
| 5000 metres | Inés Melchor (PER) | 17:14.49 | Nadia Rodríguez (ARG) | 17:19.55 | Yolanda Caballero (COL) | 17:28.26 |
| 3000 metres steeplechase | Giovana Costa (BRA) | 11:04.12 | Yolanda Caballero (COL) | 11:06.80 | Patrícia Lobo (BRA) | 11:18.99 |
| 100 metres hurdles | Janaína Sestrem (BRA) | 14.60 | Soledad Donzino (ARG) | 14.65 | Sandrine Legenort (VEN) | 14.79 |
| 400 metres hurdles | Perla dos Santos (BRA) | 58.96 | Yusmely García (VEN) | 59.89 | Raquel da Costa (BRA) | 61.06 |
| High jump | Caterine Ibargüen (COL) | 1.77 | Kerstin Weiss (CHI) | 1.77 | Jailma de Lima (BRA) | 1.71 |
| Pole vault | Alina Alló (ARG) | 3.80 | Karla Rosa da Silva (BRA) | 3.75 | María Paz Ausín (CHI) | 3.75 |
| Long jump | Keila Costa (BRA) | 6.20 | Caterine Ibargüen (COL) | 5.87 | Fernanda Gonçalves (BRA) | 5.85 |
| Triple jump | Keila Costa (BRA) | 13.66 | Jennifer Arveláez (VEN) | 13.18 | Caterine Ibargüen (COL) | 12.65 |
| Shot put | Yanira Hurtado (VEN) | 14.10 | Paola Cheppi (ARG) | 13.63 | Arelis Quiñones (COL) | 13.07 |
| Discus throw | Yesenia Gauna (VEN) | 44.60 | Karina Díaz (ECU) | 43.45 | Arelis Quiñones (COL) | 42.10 |
| Hammer throw | Jennifer Dahlgren (ARG) | 57.50 | Alessandra Peixoto (BRA) | 53.30 | Adriana Benaventa (VEN) | 53.01 |
| Javelin throw | Leryn Franco (PAR) | 47.01 | María González (VEN) | 46.90 | Anabella Petta (ARG) | 45.49 |
| Heptathlon | Valeria Steffens (CHI) | 4956 | Katiusca Venâncio (BRA) | 4915 | Thaimara Rivas (VEN) | 4832 |
| 10,000 metres track walk | Alessandra Picagevicz (BRA) | 52:03.9 | Ariana Quino (BOL) | 52:06.6 | Luisa Paltín (ECU) | 52:10.7 |
| 4 × 100 metres relay | Brazil; Renata Sampaio; Alessandra Joaquim; Evelyn dos Santos; Thatiana Regina Ignácio | 45.09 | Colombia; Caterine Ibargüen; Melisa Murillo; Sonia Petty; Norma González | 45.92 | Venezuela; Jennifer Arveláez; Sandrine Legenort; Angela Alfonso; Wilmary Álvarez | 46.82 |
| 4 × 400 metres relay | Brazil; Gisele Cruz; Amanda Dias; Joyce Prieto; Perla dos Santos | 3:41.04 | Venezuela; Wilmary Álvarez; Sandrine Legenort; Angela Alfonso; Yusmely García | 3:49.41 | Argentina; Daniela Crespo; Veronica Barraza; Jorgelina Litterini; Cristina Ferrarini | 3:49.6 |

== Medal table (unofficial) ==
* Host nation (Argentina)

| Rank | Nation | Gold | Silver | Bronze | Total |
|---|---|---|---|---|---|
| 1 | Brazil | 26 | 14 | 14 | 54 |
| 2 | Argentina* | 6 | 7 | 10 | 23 |
| 3 | Venezuela | 4 | 10 | 4 | 18 |
| 4 | Colombia | 3 | 7 | 5 | 15 |
| 5 | Chile | 2 | 2 | 6 | 10 |
| 6 | Ecuador | 1 | 1 | 3 | 5 |
| 7 | Peru | 1 | 0 | 2 | 3 |
| 8 | Paraguay | 1 | 0 | 0 | 1 |
| 9 | Panama | 0 | 2 | 0 | 2 |
| 10 | Bolivia | 0 | 1 | 0 | 1 |
| Totals (10 entries) | | 44 | 44 | 44 | 132 |
