= 2019 South American U20 Championships in Athletics =

XLIII South American U20 Championships in Athletics
- Dates: 14–16 June
- Host city: Cali, Colombia
- Venue: Estadio Pedro Grajales
- Level: Junior
- Events: 44
- Participation: 11 nations

The 43rd South American U20 Championships in Athletics were held at Estadio Pedro Grajales in Cali, Colombia, between 14 and 16 June.

== Medal summary ==
=== Men ===
Event	Gold		Silver		Bronze	
100 metres (0.0 m/s)	Erik Cardoso; Brazil	10.23 CR	Lucas da Silva; Brazil	10.40	Anderson Marquinez; Ecuador	10.53
200 metres (-1.4 m/s)	Lucas Vilar; Brazil	20.71	Anderson Marquinez; Ecuador	21.04	Steeven Salas; Ecuador	21.44
400 metres	Alison dos Santos; Brazil	45.78 CR	Douglas da Silva; Brazil	46.74	Marco Vilca; Peru	47.41
800 metres	Marco Vilca; Peru	1:48.86	Jhonatan Rodríguez; Colombia	1:49.09	Agnaldo Gonzaga; Brazil	1:49.38
1500 metres	Lucas Leite; Brazil	3:57.82	Agnaldo Gonzaga; Brazil	3:59.32	Hugo Cespedes; Paraguay	4:01.12
5000 metres	Jagannatha Sánchez; Colombia	15:03.30	Frank Sánchez; Peru	15:03.32	Alan Andachi; Ecuador	15:03.37
10,000 metres	Walter Martín; Colombia	32:33.11	Erick Tonguino; Ecuador	32:53.59	Joel Colque; Bolivia	33:03.72
110 metres hurdles (99 cm) (0.0 m/s)	Vinicius Catai; Brazil	13.80	Adrian Vieira; Brazil	13.85	Martín Sáenz; Chile	13.98
400 metres hurdles	Caio Teixeira; Brazil	51.02	Damian Moretta; Argentina	51.02	Pedro Garrido; Argentina	52.15
3000 m steeplechase	Juan Sebastián Ascanio; Colombia	9:15.34	Julio Palomino; Peru	9:16.61	Luis Mamani; Bolivia	9:24.37
4 × 100 m relay	Brazil; Erik Cardoso; Lucas da Silva; Thiago Santos; Lucas Vilar	40.30	Colombia; Jerson Lazo; John Paredes; Yuber Ramos; Luis Saltarín	40.63	Ecuador; Anderson Marquinez; Steeven Salas; Jesus Mina; Katriel Angulo	41.09
4 × 400 m relay	Brazil; Fábio Henrique Lima; Douglas da Silva; Bruno da Silva; Caio Teixeira	3:09.37	Colombia; Neiker Abello; Samuel Cortes; Juan Mena; Jhonatan Rodríguez	3:13.43	Ecuador; Anderson Marquinez; Steeven Salas; Katriel Angulo; Miguel Maldonado	3:18.76
10,000 m track walk	Sebastián Merchán; Colombia	43:46.33	Jinson Álvarez; Ecuador	44:34.63	Noe Quispe; Peru	45:37.89
High jump	Elton Petronilho; Brazil	2.12	Tomás Ferrari; Argentina	2.12	Ricardo Mireles; Venezuela	2.12
Pole vault	Pablo Zaffaroni; Argentina	5.00	José Tomás Nieto; Colombia	4.90	Dayander Pacho; Ecuador	4.90
Long jump	Joel dos Santos; Argentina	7.53	Adrian Vieira; Brazil	7.23	Bruno Yoset; Uruguay	7.20
Triple jump	Arnovis Dalmero; Colombia	16.52 CR	Geiner Moreno; Colombia	15.81	Flavio de Farias; Brazil	15.60
Shot put (6 kg)	Nazareno Sasia; Argentina	19.13	Luis Fabio Rodrigues; Brazil	17.98	Paul Bouey; Chile	17.36
Discus throw (1.75 kg)	Claudio Romero; Chile	62.68	Alan de Falchi; Brazil	56.87	Nazareno Sasia; Argentina	53.91
Hammer throw (6 kg)	Julio Nobile; Argentina	69.02	Juan Ignacio Salazar; Chile	66.07	Erick Barbosa; Colombia	65.41
Javelin throw	Luiz Maurício da Silva; Brazil	71.17	Jean Mairongo; Ecuador	68.30	Willam Torres; Ecuador	67.68
Decathlon (junior)	Jonathan da Silva; Brazil	6561	Daniel Mejicano; Venezuela	6510	Julio Angulo; Colombia	6375
WR world record | AR area record | CR championship record | GR games record | NR national record | OR Olympic record | PB personal best | SB season best | WL world leading (in a given season)

=== Women ===
Event	Gold		Silver		Bronze	
100 metres (+1.0 m/s)	Lorraine Martins; Brazil	11.42	Shary Vallecilla; Colombia	11.85	Angie González; Colombia	11.90
200 metres (-0.7 m/s)	Lorraine Martins; Brazil	23.53	Angie González; Colombia	23.94	Nicole Caicedo; Ecuador	24.21
400 metres	Maria de Sena; Brazil	53.80	Berdine Castillo; Chile	55.25	Eliana Fuentes; Colombia	55.87
800 metres	Eliana Fuentes; Colombia	2:09.85	María Verónica Pérez; Argentina	2:09.97	Berdine Castillo; Chile	2:10.05
1500 metres	Laura Acuña; Chile	4:36.85	María Eugenia Fairhurst; Argentina	4:38.99	Ana María Cifuentes; Colombia	4:43.55
3000 metres	Ana María Cifuentes; Colombia	10:03.93	Subhadra Sánchez; Colombia	10:05.71	María Eugenia Fairhurst; Argentina	10:07.43
5000 metres	Sofia Mamani; Peru	17:40.01	Alejandra Sierra; Colombia	17:49.10	Shellcy Sarmiento; Colombia	18:01.05
100 metres hurdles (+2.3 m/s)	Yoveinny Mota; Venezuela	13.52	Nicole Caicedo; Ecuador	13.74	Micaela de Mello; Brazil	13.75
400 metres hurdles	Valeria Cabezas; Colombia	57.10 CR	Jessica Moreira; Brazil	57.28	Chayenne da Silva; Brazil	57.85
3000 m steeplechase	Jeovana dos Santos; Brazil	11:24.14	Jazmin Matos; Peru	11:35.25	María Eugenia Once; Ecuador	11:40.32
4 × 100 m relay	Colombia; Angie González; Karen Ruiz; Shary Vallecilla; Shelsy Romero	45.98	Brazil; Lorraine Martins; Leticia Lima; Vida Caetano; Barbara da Cunha	46.11	Ecuador; Aimara Nazareno; Katherine Chillambo; Ashley Perea; Nicole Chala	46.86
4 × 400 m relay	Brazil; Maria de Sena; Lorraine Martins; Chayenne da Silva; Jessica Moreira	3:37.24	Colombia; Darly Montenegro; Eliana Fuentes; María Alejandra González; Valeria Cabezas	3:45.96	Chile; Laura Acuña; Berdine Castillo; Anaís Hernández; Danae Avila	3:53.58
10,000 m track walk	Mary Luz Andía; Peru	47:10.20 CR	Emily Villafuerte; Peru	48:12.38	Mayra Quispe; Bolivia	48:51.22
High jump	Arielly Rodrigues; Brazil	1.73	Catalina Carcamo; Chile	1.70	Susan Cañaveral; Colombia	1.70
Pole vault	Luciana Gómez; Argentina	3.85	Javiera Contreras; Chile	3.70	Tatiana Bedoya; Colombia	3.65
Long jump	Andriele Zander; Brazil	6.29	Lissandra Campos; Brazil	6.11	Trinidad Hurtado; Chile	6.06
Triple jump	Maria Vitoria de Queiroz; Brazil	12.81	Nerisnelia Sousa; Brazil	12.75	María Gracia Varas; Chile	12.33
Shot put	Javiera Bravo; Chile	14.80	Rafaela Cristine de Sousa; Brazil	14.612	Gleice de Castro; Brazil	14.07
Discus throw	Merari Herrera; Ecuador	47.87	Rafaela da Silva; Brazil	47.68	Brigith Mayorga; Colombia	44.26
Hammer throw	Ximena Zorrilla; Peru	59.19	Antonella Creazzola; Venezuela	54.09	Jossefa Muñoz; Chile	53.25
Javelin throw	Juleisy Angulo; Ecuador	49.83	Deisiane Teixeira; Brazil	49.74	Avigail Pino; Colombia	46.28
Heptathlon	Rocio Chaparro; Paraguay	4968	Juliana Oliveira; Brazil	4937	Paloma Cardoso; Brazil	4861
WR world record | AR area record | CR championship record | GR games record | NR national record | OR Olympic record | PB personal best | SB season best | WL world leading (in a given season)

== Medal table ==
The host country is highlighted in lavender blue

Rank	Nation	Gold	Silver	Bronze	Total
1	Brazil (BRA)	19	15	6	40
2	Colombia (COL)*	9	10	10	29
3	Argentina (ARG)	5	4	3	12
4	Peru (PER)	4	4	2	10
5	Chile (CHI)	3	4	7	14
6	Ecuador (ECU)	2	6	9	17
7	Venezuela (VEN)	1	2	1	4
8	Paraguay (PAR)	1	0	1	2
9	Bolivia (BOL)	0	0	3	3
10	Uruguay (URU)	0	0	1	1
Totals (10 entries)		44	45	43	132
