= Athletics at the 2021 Junior Pan American Games =

- Athletics pictogram
- Venue: Pascual Guerrero Olympic Stadium
- Dates: 30 November–4 December
- Competitors: 415 from 36 nations

Athletics competitions at the 2021 Junior Pan American Games in Cali, Colombia were held from November 30 – December 4, 2021, at the Pascual Guerrero Olympic Stadium.
A total of 45 events were held: 22 boys, 22 girls and 1 mixed.

== Medal summary ==
=== Medal table ===
* Host nation (Colombia)

Rank	Nation	Gold	Silver	Bronze	Total
1	Brazil	10	12	8	30
2	Cuba	9	6	3	18
3	Ecuador	9	2	2	13
4	Mexico	4	3	6	13
5	Colombia*	2	7	11	20
6	Peru	2	3	1	6
7	Dominican Republic	2	1	2	5
8	Puerto Rico	2	0	0	2
9	Chile	1	4	3	8
10	Venezuela	1	1	1	3
11	Argentina	1	0	5	6
12	Bolivia	1	0	0	1
12	Costa Rica	1	0	0	1
14	Trinidad and Tobago	0	1	1	2
15	El Salvador	0	1	0	1
15	Grenada	0	1	0	1
15	Guyana	0	1	0	1
15	Saint Kitts and Nevis	0	1	0	1
15	Uruguay	0	1	0	1
20	Bahamas	0	0	1	1
20	Guatemala	0	0	1	1
Totals (21 entries)		45	45	45	135

== Medalists ==
=== Boys ===
Event	Gold		Silver		Bronze	
100 metres	Erik Cardoso; Brazil	10.33	Neiker Abello; Colombia	10.36	Franco Florio; Argentina	10.37
200 metres	Anderson Marquinez; Ecuador	20.51	Lucas Vilar; Brazil	20.59	Lucas da Silva; Brazil	20.68
400 metres	Luis Avilés; Mexico	45.59	Leonardo Castillo; Cuba	45.79	Javier Gómez; Venezuela	46.13
800 metres	Ryan López; Venezuela	1:49.30	Leonardo de Jesus; Brazil	1:50.14	Eduardo Moreira; Brazil	1:50.21
1500 metres	Juan Diego Castro; Costa Rica	3:44.10	Santiago Catrofe; Uruguay	3:44.71	José Zabala; Argentina	3:45.79
5000 metres	David Ninavia; Bolivia	14:21.36	Fábio Correia; Brazil	14:30.31	José Luis Chaupin; Peru	14:31.70
10,000 metres	Hector Pagan; Puerto Rico	30:20.48	Frank Lujan; Peru	30:58.68	Omar Castillo; Mexico	31:07.02
110 metres hurdles	Marcos Herrera; Ecuador	13.94	John Paredes; Colombia	13.95	Guillermo Campos; Mexico	14.05
400 metres hurdles	Yoao Illas; Cuba	50.91	Caio Teixeira; Brazil	51.48	Matheus Coelho; Brazil	51.64
3000 metres steeplechase	Julio Palomino; Peru	8:56.56	César Daniel Gómez; Mexico	8:56.65	Tomas Vega; Argentina	9:05.61
4 × 100 metres relay	Brazil; Adrian Vieira; Lucas Vilar; Erik Cardoso; Lucas da Silva	39.21 U23 AR	Ecuador; Katriel Angulo; Anderson Marquinez; Steeven Salas; Kevin Simisterra	40.02	Argentina; Tomás Mondino; Agustín Pinti; Bautista Diamante; Franco Florio	40.63
4 × 400 metres relay	Ecuador; Katriel Angulo; Alan Minda; Anderson Marquinez; Steeven Salas	3:08.02	Brazil; Matheus Coelho; João Henrique Cabral; Caio Teixeira; Douglas da Silva	3:08.42	Mexico; Guillermo Campos; Julio Díaz; Javier Martínez; Luis Avilés	3:08.85
20,000 metres walk	David Hurtado; Ecuador	1:21:55.03	Matheus Corrêa; Brazil	1:22:18.90	José Ortiz; Guatemala	1:23:47.47
High jump	Erick Portillo; Mexico	2.21	Elton Petronilho; Brazil	2.19	Kyle Alcine; Bahamas	2.19
Pole vault	Dyander Pacho; Ecuador	5.20	Austin Ramos; Ecuador	5.15	José Tomás Nieto; Colombia	5.10
Long jump	Maikel Vidal; Cuba	7.97	Kelsey Daniel; Trinidad and Tobago	7.90	Jhon Berrío; Colombia	7.82
Triple jump	Andy Hechavarría; Cuba	16.77	Geiner Moreno; Colombia	16.41	Frixon Chila; Ecuador	16.12
Shot put	Nazareno Sasia; Argentina	20.08	Ronald Grueso; Colombia	17.98	Juan Carley Vázquez; Cuba	17.85
Discus throw	Lucas Nervi; Chile	61.08	Mario Díaz; Cuba	60.77	Anyel Álvarez; Cuba	57.03
Hammer throw	Alencar Pereira; Brazil	69.78	Ronald Mencía; Cuba	67.23	Aldo Zavala Delgado; Mexico	63.95
Javelin throw	Pedro Henrique Rodrigues; Brazil	74.41	Luiz Maurício da Silva; Brazil	71.35	Tyriq Horsford; Trinidad and Tobago	71.33
Decathlon	José Fernando Ferreira; Brazil	7,360	Esteban Ibáñez; El Salvador	6,966	Damián Moretta; Argentina	6,959

=== Girls ===
Event	Gold		Silver		Bronze	
100 metres	Anahí Suárez; Ecuador	11.32	Amya Clarke; Saint Kitts and Nevis	11.58	Natalia Linares; Colombia	11.60
200 metres	Anahí Suárez; Ecuador	22.96	Shary Vallecilla; Colombia	23.07	Fiordaliza Cofil; Dominican Republic	23.46
400 metres	Fiordaliza Cofil; Dominican Republic	52.10	Martina Weil; Chile	52.35 NU23R	Tiffani Marinho; Brazil	52.67
800 metres	Daily Cooper; Cuba	2:08.62	Berdine Castillo; Chile	2:09.32	Verónica Ángel; Mexico	2:09.40
1500 metres	Anahí Álvarez; Mexico	4:20.68	Verónica Ángel; Mexico	4:30.13	Laura Acuña; Chile	4:31.01
5000 metres	Anahí Álvarez; Mexico	15:52.80	Maria Lucineida Moreira; Brazil	16:39.77	Laura Espinosa; Colombia	16:53.74
10,000 metres	Sofia Isabel Mamani; Peru	34:43.80	María de Jesús Ruiz; Mexico	35:02.77	Maria Lucineida Moreira; Brazil	35:10.83
100 metres hurdles	Greisys Roble; Cuba	13.07	Ketiley Batista; Brazil	13.27	Keily Pérez; Cuba	13.33
400 metres hurdles	Chayenne da Silva; Brazil	55.97	Ariliannis Colás; Cuba	57.20	Valeria Cabezas; Colombia	57.49
3000 metres steeplechase	Mirelle da Silva; Brazil	10:28.69	Veronica Huacasi; Peru	10:39.70	Stefany López; Colombia	10:47.82
4 × 100 metres relay	Colombia; María Alejandra Murillo; Natalia Linares; Shary Vallecilla; Laura Martínez	43.59 U23 AR	Brazil; Vida Caetano; Rita Silva; Letícia Lima; Gabriela Mourão	44.04	Ecuador; Nicole Chala; Anahí Suárez; Nicole Caicedo; Andreina Minda	44.56
4 × 400 metres relay	Brazil; Maria Victoria de Sena; Marlene dos Santos; Chayenne da Silva; Tiffani Marinho	3:33.40 U23 AR	Chile; Rocío Muñoz; Berdine Castillo; Anaís Hernández; Martina Weil	3:38.24	Mexico; Danna Barajas; Valeria González; Yara Amador; Verónica Ángel	3:48.21
20,000 metres walk	Glenda Morejón; Ecuador	1:33:54.16	Mary Luz Andía; Peru	1:35:26.52	Laura Chalarca; Colombia	1:35:54.97
High jump	Jennifer Rodríguez; Colombia	1.90	Marysabel Senyu; Dominican Republic	1.81	Arielly Rodrigues; Brazil	1.76
Pole vault	Isabel de Quadros; Brazil	4.20	Javiera Contreras; Chile	3.90	Karen Bedoya; Colombia	3.90
Long jump	Paola Fernández; Puerto Rico	6.33	Natalia Linares; Colombia	6.27	Thaina Fernandes; Brazil	6.25
Triple jump	Leyanis Pérez; Cuba	14.39	Chantoba Bright; Guyana	13.50	Leidy Cuesta; Colombia	13.24
Shot put	Rosa Ramírez; Dominican Republic	17.45	Ana Caroline Silva; Brazil	16.86	Milena Sens; Brazil	16.76
Discus throw	Silinda Morales; Cuba	59.13	Melany Matheus; Cuba	54.31	Catalina Bravo; Chile	52.44
Hammer throw	Yaritza Martínez; Cuba	67.47	Silennis Vargas; Venezuela	65.63 U20 AR	Mariana García; Chile	64.86
Javelin throw	Juleisy Angulo; Ecuador	58.26	Yiselena Ballar; Cuba	57.14	Valentina Barrios; Colombia	51.46
Heptathlon	Marys Patterson; Cuba	5,663	Joniar Thomas; Grenada	5,484 NR (Note: 5,254 by World Athletics source)	Sara Isabel García; Colombia	5,391
WR world record | AR area record | CR championship record | GR games record | NR national record | OR Olympic record | PB personal best | SB season best | WL world leading (in a given season)

=== Mixed ===
Event	Gold		Silver		Bronze	
4 × 400 metres relay	Brazil; Chayenne da Silva; Douglas da Silva; João Henrique Cabral; Tiffani Marinho	3:18.54 AU23R	Colombia; Angie Melisa Arévalo; Neider Abello; Neiker Abello; Valeria Cabezas	3:23.79	Dominican Republic; Ángelo Féliz; Fiordaliza Cofil; Franquelo Pérez; Liranyi Alonso	3:28.28
WR world record | AR area record | CR championship record | GR games record | NR national record | OR Olympic record | PB personal best | SB season best | WL world leading (in a given season)

== Participation ==
- Antigua and Barbuda (2)
- Argentina (28)
- Bahamas (4)
- Belize (2)
- Bermuda (1)
- Bolivia (7)
- Brazil (68)
- British Virgin Islands (2)
- Cayman Islands (2)
- Chile (27)
- Colombia (36)
- Costa Rica (8)
- Cuba (33)
- Dominica (2)
- Dominican Republic (13)
- Ecuador (32)
- Grenada (3)
- Guatemala (7)
- Guyana (5)
- Honduras (1)
- Mexico (41)
- Nicaragua (2)
- Panama (2)
- Paraguay (4)
- Peru (17)
- Puerto Rico (17)
- Saint Kitts and Nevis (2)
- Saint Lucia (1)
- Saint Vincent and the Grenadines (2)
- El Salvador (3)
- Suriname (1)
- Trinidad and Tobago (5)
- United States Virgin Islands (1)
- Uruguay (4)
- Venezuela (18)
