= Ronal Longa =

Colombian sprinter (born 2004)

Personal information
- Full name: Ronal Longa Mosquera
- Nationality: Colombian
- Born: 30 June 2004 (age 22)

Sport
- Country: Colombia
- Sport: Athletics
- Events: 60 metres; 100 metres; 200 metres; 4×100 metres
- Club: Liga de Bogotá

Achievements and titles
- Personal bests: 60 metres: 6.65 (2025); 100 metres: 9.85 A AR, AU23R (2026); 200 metres: 20.31 (2026); 4×100 metres: 38.17 NR (2026)
Medal record
Representing Colombia
Men's athletics
Event	1st	2nd	3rd
Pan American Championships	1	0	0
CAC Games	1	0	0
South American Games	3	0	0
South American Championships	0	3	0
Bolivarian Games	2	1	0
Junior Pan American Games	1	1	1
South American U23 Championships	1	0	1
South American U20 Championships	1	1	0
Total	10	6	2
Pan American Championships
Gold medal – first place	2026 Medellín	100 m
Central American and Caribbean Games
Gold medal – first place	2026 Santo Domingo	100 m
South American Games
Gold medal – first place	2026 Santa Fe	100 m
Gold medal – first place	2026 Santa Fe	200 m
Gold medal – first place	2026 Santa Fe	4×100 m relay
South American Championships
Silver medal – second place	2023 São Paulo	100 m
Silver medal – second place	2025 Mar del Plata	100 m
Silver medal – second place	2025 Mar del Plata	200 m
Bolivarian Games
Gold medal – first place	2025 Lima-Ayacucho	100 m
Gold medal – first place	2025 Lima-Ayacucho	4×100 m relay
Silver medal – second place	2025 Lima-Ayacucho	200 m
Junior Pan American Games
Gold medal – first place	2025 Asunción	4×100 m relay
Silver medal – second place	2025 Asunción	100 m
Bronze medal – third place	2025 Asunción	200 m
South American U23 Championships
Gold medal – first place	2022 Cascavel	4×100 m relay
Bronze medal – third place	2022 Cascavel	100 m
South American U20 Championships
Gold medal – first place	2023 Bogotá	4×100 m relay
Silver medal – second place	2023 Bogotá	100 m

Ronal Longa (born 30 June 2004) is a Colombian track and field athlete who competes as a sprinter. He is the Colombian U20 and U23 national record holder over 100 metres.

== Biography ==
Longa became only the fifth junior athlete to break the 10-second barrier for the 100 metres, and set a new national senior record time of 9.99 seconds to win the bronze medal at the South American Athletics Championships, in São Paulo in July 2023.

Longa competed at the 2023 World Athletics Championships but suffered an injury in the 100 metres and did not qualify from his heat.

He competed in the 100 metres at the 2024 Paris Olympics.

In September 2025, he was a semi-finalist in the 100 metres at the 2025 World Championships in Tokyo, Japan.

Selected for the inaugural Pan American Championships in Medellín, he won the 100 metres final, running a new personal best of 9.85 seconds on 26 June, finishing ahead of Canadian Eliezer Adjibi and Eloy Benitez of Puerto Rico. In August, he won the gold medal in the 100 metres at the 2026 CAC Games in Santo Domingo, Dominican Republic. In September, he competed over 100 m at the inaugural World Ultimate Championship in Budapest. He won the 100 metres gold medal at the 2026 South American Games.

== International competitions ==
Year	Competition	Venue	Position	Event	Result
Representing Colombia
2022	World U20 Championships	Cali, Colombia	19th (sf)	100 m	10.45 s
2022	World U20 Championships	Cali, Colombia	—N/a	4 × 100 m relay	DQ
2022	South American U23 Championships	Cascavel, Brazil	3rd	100 m	10.30 s
2022	South American U23 Championships	Cascavel, Brazil	1st	4 × 100 m relay	39.59 s NU23R
2023	South American U20 Championships	Bogotá, Colombia	2nd	100 m	10.08 s NR, NU20R
2023	South American U20 Championships	Bogotá, Colombia	1st	4 × 100 m relay	39.77 s NU20R
2023	Central American and Caribbean Games	San Salvador, El Salvador	8th	100 m	10.63 s
2023	Central American and Caribbean Games	San Salvador, El Salvador	4th	4 × 100 m relay	39.45 s
2023	South American Championships	São Paulo, Brazil	2nd	100 m	9.99 s AU23R, AU20R, NR
2023	World Championships	Budapest, Hungary	54th (h)	100 m	11.31 s
2023	Pan American Games	Santiago, Chile	—N/a	100 m	DQ
2024	Olympic Games	Paris, France	46th (h)	100 m	10.29 s
2025	South American Championships	Mar del Plata, Argentina	2nd	100 m	10.04 s
2025	South American Championships	Mar del Plata, Argentina	2nd	200 m	20.56 s
2025	Junior Pan American Games (U23)	Asunción, Paraguay	2nd	100 m	10.07 s
2025	Junior Pan American Games (U23)	Asunción, Paraguay	3rd	200 m	20.51 s
2025	Junior Pan American Games (U23)	Asunción, Paraguay	1st	4 × 100 m relay	38.99 s JPR, AU23R
2025	World Championships	Tokyo, Japan	23rd (sf)	100 m	10.23 s
2025	Bolivarian Games	Lima, Peru	1st	100 m	10.29 s
2025	Bolivarian Games	Lima, Peru	2nd	200 m	20.83 s
2025	Bolivarian Games	Lima, Peru	1st	4 × 100 m relay	38.73 s GR
2026	Pan American Championships	Medellín, Colombia	1st	100 m	9.85 s AR, AU23R
2026	Herculis	Fontvieille, Monaco	6th	100 m	10.05 s
2026	Central American and Caribbean Games	Santo Domingo, Dominican Republic	1st	100 m	10.06 s
2026	Central American and Caribbean Games	Santo Domingo, Dominican Republic	8th	200 m	29.80 s
2026	Central American and Caribbean Games	Santo Domingo, Dominican Republic	4th	4 × 100 m relay	38.17 s NR
2026	World Ultimate Championship	Budapest, Hungary	12th (sf)	100 m	10.12 s
2026	South American Games	Santa Fe, Argentina	1st	100 m	10.10 s
2026	South American Games	Santa Fe, Argentina	1st	200 m	20.43 s
2026	South American Games	Santa Fe, Argentina	1st	4 × 100 m relay	39.09 s
