= Lorraine Martins =

Brazilian sprinter (born 2000)

Personal information
- Full name: Lorraine Barbosa Martins
- Nationality: Brazil
- Born: April 4, 2000 (age 26) Rio de Janeiro, Brazil

Sport
- Sport: Athletics
- Event(s): 100 metres, 200 metres

Achievements and titles
- Personal best(s): 100m: 11.16s (2023); 200m: 22.59s (2023)
Medal record
Representing Brazil
Pan American Games
Gold medal – first place	2019 Lima	4x100m relay

Lorraine Barbosa Martins (born April 4, 2000) is a Brazilian sprinter.

== Career ==
Martins first International competition came at the 2017 South American U20 Championships, where she won double gold in the 100m and 200m. Martins ran for Brazil at the 2017 IAAF World U18 Championships, finishing 4th in the 100m. She also competed at the 2018 IAAF World U20 Championships, reaching the finals in the 100m and 200m events. Martins competed at the 2019 South American U20 Championships, where she won gold in both the 100m and 200m events.

Martins competed at the 2019 World Championships in Athletics in the 200m and the 4 × 100 m relay events but failed to make a final in both, as the relay team was disqualified after running what would have been a final qualifying place in the heats.

Martins, alongside her relay teammates, won gold in the 4 × 100 m relay event at the 2019 Military World games.

She competed at the 2020 Summer Olympics.

Martins is missing her index and ring fingers on her left hand, making it harder to get into position in the starting blocks.

== Personal bests ==
Her best marks are:

- 100 m: 11.16 s (wind: +0.1 m/s) – Cuiaba, Brazil, 6 Jul 2023
- 200 m: 22.59 s (wind: +1.8 m/s) – Cuiaba, Brazil, 9 Jul 2023

== International Competitions ==
DQ = disqualified

Year	Competition	Venue	Position	Event	Notes
2017	South American U20 Championships	Leonora, Guyana	1st	100m	
2017	South American U20 Championships	Leonora, Guyana	1st	200m	
2017	IAAF World U18 Championships	Nairobi, Kenya	4th	100m	
2017	IAAF World U18 Championships	Nairobi, Kenya	4th	200m	
2018	IAAF World U20 Championships	Tampere, Finland	6th	100m	
2018	IAAF World U20 Championships	Tampere, Finland	7th	200m	
2019	South American U20 Championships	Cali, Colombia	1st	100m	11.42
2019	South American U20 Championships	Cali, Colombia	1st	200m	23.53
2019	South American U20 Championships	Cali, Colombia	2nd	4 × 100 m relay	
2019	South American U20 Championships	Cali, Colombia	1st	4 × 400 m relay	
2019	2019 World Athletics Championships	Doha, Qatar	38th	200m	23.56
2019	2019 World Athletics Championships	Doha, Qatar	DQ	4 × 100 m relay	
2019	2019 Military World Games	Wuhan, China	5th (SF)	200m	
2019	2019 Military World Games	Wuhan, China	1st	4 × 100 m relay	
