= 2021 South American U20 Championships in Athletics =

XLIV South American U20 Championships in Athletics
- Dates: 9–10 July
- Host city: Lima, Peru
- Venue: Villa Deportiva Nacional
- Level: Junior
- Events: 44
- Participation: 10 nations

The 44th South American U20 Championships in Athletics were held at Villa Deportiva Nacional in Lima, Peru, between 9 and 10 July.

== Medal summary ==
=== Men ===
Event	Gold		Silver		Bronze	
100 metres (+1.5 m/s)	Tomás Mondino; Argentina	10.43	Bautista Diamante; Argentina	10.53	John Paredes; Colombia	10.55
200 metres (+1.6 m/s)	Tomás Mondino; Argentina	21.24	Bautista Diamante; Argentina	21.27	Katriel Angulo; Ecuador	21.44
400 metres	Vinícius Galeno; Brazil	48.40	Miguel Maldonado; Ecuador	48.73	Martín Kouyoumdjian; Chile	48.90
800 metres	Leonardo de Jesus; Brazil	1:48.78	Pedro Emmert; Argentina	1:51.70	Pedro Luiz de Souza; Brazil	1:52.71
1500 metres	Dylan Van der Hock; Argentina	3:50.73	Brayan Jara; Chile	3:52.33	Jânio Varjão; Brazil	3:52.45
3000 metres	Matías Reynaga; Argentina	8:19.81 CR	Rolando Ortíz; Colombia	8:20.34	David Ninavia; Bolivia	8:23.01
5000 metres	David Ninavia; Bolivia	14:29.0	Matías Reynaga; Argentina	14:43.5	Alex Caiza; Ecuador	14:51.2
110 metres hurdles (99 cm) (-0.2 m/s)	Fabricio Pereira; Brazil	13.73	John Paredes; Colombia	13.75	Kevin Simisterra; Ecuador	14.26
400 metres hurdles	Gabriel dos Santos; Brazil	52.33	César Parra; Venezuela	52.84	Neider Abello; Colombia	53.34
3000 m steeplechase	Dylan Van der Hock; Argentina	9:07.74	Natan Nepomuceno; Brazil	9:08.01	Vinícius Alves; Brazil	9:11.08
4 × 100 m relay	Brazil; Igor de Oliveira; Renan Gallina; Fabricio Pereira; Robson Aguiar	40.30	Ecuador; Xavier Casierra; Katriel Angulo; Miguel Maldonado; Steeven Salas	40.63	Argentina; Bruno de Genaro; Tomás Mondino; Pedro Emmert; Bautista Diamante	41.09
4 × 400 m relay	Brazil; João Henrrique Barros; Leonardo de Jesus; Pedro Luiz de Souza; Vinicius Galeno	3:09.37	Ecuador; Katriel Angulo; Miguel Maldonado; Steeven Salas; Alan Minda	3:13.43	Argentina; Bruno de Genaro; Bautista Diamante; Matías Reynaga; Pedro Emmert	3:18.76
10,000 m walk	Cristián Rojas; Colombia	43:46.33	Saul Wanputsrit; Ecuador	44:34.63	Mateo Romero; Colombia	45:37.89
High jump	Anderson Asprilla; Colombia	2.07	Emiliano Benítez; Argentina	2.04	Roger Alves; Brazil	2.04
Pole vault	Austin Ramos; Ecuador	4.90	Nicolas Martín; Chile	4.65	Only 2 finishers	
Long jump	Jhon Berrío; Colombia	7.61	Gabriel Boza; Brazil	7.50	Julio Cesar Mendes; Brazil	7.06
Triple jump	Gregory Palacios; Ecuador	15.51	Óscar Cometa; Colombia	15.24	Felipe da Silva; Brazil	15.20
Shot put (6 kg)	Ronald Grueso; Colombia	17.88	Vinicius Avancini; Brazil	17.31	Juan Manuel Arrieguez; Argentina	17.02
Discus throw (1.75 kg)	Ronald Grueso; Colombia	57.78	Rodrigo Trenhago; Brazil	52.23	Steven Cevallos; Ecuador	51.32
Hammer throw (6 kg)	Sebastián Tommasi; Argentina	68.83	Luis Núñez; Argentina	65.99	Cipriano Riquelme; Chile	63.33
Javelin throw	Juan Amarilla; Argentina	62.72	Lars Flaming; Paraguay	60.70	Lautaro Techera; Uruguay	60.37
Decathlon (junior)	Arnaldo Kowales Junior; Brazil	6511	Matheus Pires; Venezuela	6433	Ricardo Mireles; Venezuela	6388
WR world record | AR area record | CR championship record | GR games record | NR national record | OR Olympic record | PB personal best | SB season best | WL world leading (in a given season)

=== Women ===
Event	Gold		Silver		Bronze	
100 metres (+1.5 m/s)	Natalia Linares; Colombia	11.68	Nicole Chala; Ecuador	11.98	Ana Cecilia de Oliveira; Brazil	12.07
200 metres (+0.1 m/s)	Erica Cavalheiro; Brazil	24.52	Ana Cecilia de Oliveira; Brazil	24.88	María Ignacia Aspillaga; Chile	24.89
400 metres	Erica Cavalheiro; Brazil	54.08	Taimara de Melo; Brazil	57.13	Marcela Reyes; Colombia	57.75
800 metres	Laura Acuña; Chile	2:10.79	Angeli Garrido; Venezuela	2:12.23	Lindsey Lopes; Brazil	2:12.89
1500 metres	Carmen Alder; Ecuador	4:24.53 CR	Laura Acuña; Chile	4:26.94	Stefany López; Colombia	4:32.02
3000 metres	Carmen Alder; Ecuador	9:26.51 CR	Sofía Mamani; Peru	9:37.07	Paula Vega; Ecuador	10:07.42
5000 metres	Sofía Mamani; Peru	16:41.34 CR	Paula Vega; Ecuador	17:18.91	Jimena Apaza; Peru	17:57.61
100 metres hurdles (+0.6 m/s)	Daniele Campigotto; Brazil	13.99	Isabel Urrutia; Colombia	14.05	Catalina González; Argentina	14.74
400 metres hurdles	María Alejandra Murillo; Colombia	1:01.69	Camille de Oliveira; Brazil	1:01.73	Laiane de Almeida; Brazil	1:03.50
3000 m steeplechase	Stefany López; Colombia	10:14.81 CR	Veronica Huacasi; Peru	10:28.81	Jimena Apaza; Peru	11:07.43
4 × 100 m relay	Colombia; Isabel Urrutia; Natalia Linares; Melany Bolaño; Laura Martínez	46.35	Brazil; Alana Amorim; Tainara Mees; Suellen de Sant Anna; Ana Cecilia de Oliveira	47.38	Ecuador; Xiomara Ibarra; Dayanara Nazareno; Noelia Martínez; Nicole Chala	48.83
4 × 400 m relay	Brazil; Leticia de Oliveira; Marina de Siqueira; Laiane de Almeida; Taimara de Melo	3:51.17	Colombia; Marcela Reyes; Laura Ossa; María Alejandra Murillo; Jhovana Camargo	3:53.43	Peru; Andrea Gómez; Rebeca Vásquez; Vania Ramírez; Ariana Botton	4:05.06
10,000 m walk	Gabriela Muniz; Brazil	47:11.69	Paula Valdez; Ecuador	47:17.82	Ines Condo; Bolivia	49:07.18
High jump	Arielly Rodrigues; Brazil	1.79	Silvina Gil; Uruguay	1.73	Joaquina Dura; Argentina	1.73
Pole vault	Luciana Gómez; Argentina	3.90	Tatiana Bedoya; Colombia	3.57	Sofía Hryncyszyn; Argentina	3.32
Long jump	Natalia Linares; Colombia	6.14	Lissandra Campos; Brazil	6.07	Vanessa dos Santos; Brazil	5.93
Triple jump	Whaylla de Oliveira; Brazil	12.63	Estrella Lobo; Colombia	12.52	Indiana Holgado; Argentina	12.46
Shot put	Taniele da Silva; Brazil	12.66	Nicole Valencia; Colombia	12.29	Giovanna Costa; Brazil	11.71
Discus throw	Valentina Ulloa; Chile	44.89	Ana Luz Sarli; Argentina	42.03	Giovanna Costa; Brazil	39.95
Hammer throw	Valentina Claveria; Chile	59.05	Nereida Santacruz; Ecuador	56.25	Yennifer Barahona; Colombia	52.45
Javelin throw	Valentina Barrios; Colombia	47.97	Manuela Rotundo; Uruguay	46.45	Fiorella Veloso; Paraguay	44.02
Heptathlon	Giovana Corradi; Brazil	5090	Ana Luisa Ferraz; Brazil	4995	Mariam Buenanueva; Argentina	4778
WR world record | AR area record | CR championship record | GR games record | NR national record | OR Olympic record | PB personal best | SB season best | WL world leading (in a given season)

=== Mixed ===
Event	Gold		Silver		Bronze	
4 × 400 m relay	Brazil; Gabriel dos Santos; Erica Cavalheiro; Camille de Oliveira; João Henrrique Barros	3:28.33	Ecuador; Miguel Maldonado; Carmen Alder; Adriana Alajo; Alan Minda	3:35.95	Peru; José Romero; Rebeca Vasquez; Hugo Carazas; Andrea Gómez	3:41.79

== Medal table ==
Rank	Nation	Gold	Silver	Bronze	Total
1	Brazil (BRA)	17	11	12	40
2	Colombia (COL)	11	8	6	25
3	Argentina (ARG)	8	7	8	23
4	Ecuador (ECU)	4	9	6	19
5	Chile (CHI)	3	3	3	9
6	Peru (PER)	1	2	4	7
7	Bolivia (BOL)	1	0	2	3
8	Uruguay (URU)	0	2	1	3
8	Venezuela (VEN)	0	2	1	3
10	Paraguay (PAR)	0	1	1	2
Totals (10 entries)		45	45	44	134
