= Tiffany Flynn =

American athlete (born 1995)

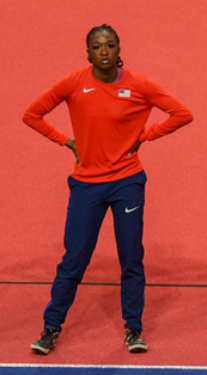
- Tiffany Flynn in 2022

Personal information
- Nationality: American
- Born: 2 September 1995 (age 30) Lithonia, Georgia
- Education: Miller Grove High School; Mississippi State University

Sport
- Sport: Track and Field; Athletics
- Event: Long jump
- Turned pro: 2019
Medal record
Women's athletics
Representing United States
Pan American Games
Bronze medal – third place	2023 Santiago	Long Jump

Tiffany Flynn (born 2 September 1995) is an American athlete who competes in the long jump.

A former student at Mississippi State University, Flynn made her major championship debut in 2022 both indoor and outdoor. She finished fourth at the 2022 World Athletics Indoor Championships in Belgrade with a jump of 6.78. Finishing third at the US national championship in June 2022 earned Flynn a place at the 2022 World Athletics Championships in Eugene, Oregon where Flynn qualified for the final.
