= María Gracia Varas =

Chilean track and field athlete (2001–2025)

Personal information
- Nationality: Chilean
- Born: 19 December 2001 Santiago, Chile
- Died: 18 July 2025 (aged 23) Santiago, Chile

Sport
- Sport: Track and field
- Event(s): Long jump triple jump

María Gracia Urbana Varas Fuenzalida (Spanish: [maˈɾia ˈɣɾasja uɾˈβana βaɾas fwensaˈliða]; 19 December 2001 – 18 July 2025) was a Chilean athlete. She specialized in long jump and triple jump.

== Biography ==
Varas was born in Santiago 19 December 2001. During the 43rd South American U-20 Athletics Championship, she won a bronze medal in the 4x100 meter relay event in Cali, Colombia, achieving a time of 12.33 for her split.

Varas died on 18 July 2025, at the age of 23. The cause of death was revealed to be mononucleosis.
