= Centro de Alto Rendimiento Deportivo Pedro Candioti =

Sports complex in Santa Fe, Argentina

The Centro de Alto Rendimiento Deportivo Pedro Candioti (known as Card) is a sports complex and IAAF Regional Development Centre in Santa Fe, Argentina.

It was opened in 1982, being inaugurated on 24 November, to host the II South American Games and be the home for The Atlético Velocidad y Resistencia club of Santa Fe. and since then it has hosted the 1983 South American Championships in Athletics; the 1985, 1994 and 2001 South American Junior Championships in Athletics; and the 1989 and 2001 Pan American Junior Athletics Championships, beside numerous seminars, congresses and courses.

The complex was dedicated to Pedro Candioti, athletic swimmer.

== History ==
=== Before CARD ===
The Atlético Velocidad y Resistencia club of Santa Fe was founded 2 February 1933, by a group of local sports enthusiasts to participate in various sports. Their inaugural meeting of the club took place at the home of the "Kato Kirschner" family, located at 1653 Calle 4 de Enero, where the club's offices were later located for several years. In 1934, the club was a founding member of the Santa Fe Athletics Federation, which later became the Santa Fe Athletics Association.

The club in its early years were primarily participants in "traditional" Intercollegiate tournaments, which began in the 1940s and continued until 1958 (when they became organized by the National Directorate of Physical Education of the Ministry of Education of the Nation, from).

=== Acquisition of property (1968) ===
For many years, the club relocated properties without a permanent structure, it operated in this way until 1968 when it acquired the property on the border of the La Guardia and Colastiné districts, upon Ramón Sureda Bordas assuming the presidency after the death of Pedro Candioti and the interim presidency of Alfredo Güemes. The property was initially little more than 11 hectares, gradually different spaces were built on the property.

=== Construction and refurbishments ===
First came the construction of a small hall, followed by changing rooms, a canteen, office, and meeting room.

In the early days, two large swimming pools were built (one measuring 25 x 16 x 2 meters and a separate pool for children measuring 4 x 8 meters), which were both inaugurated in 1971, along with a snack bar and restrooms. A multi-sports court was also added, allowing for the practice of various sports, along with a regulation-size soccer field as well as long jump pits and throwing circles where athletic tournaments in various disciplines were held on several occasions.

=== Host of the II Southern Cross Games (1982) ===
The province hosted the II Southern Cross Games (now ODESUR). To coincide with the event, the centre was officially inaugurated on 24 November 1982. Through this synergy, the venue became popular primarily because it was the only track that met the optimal conditions for national and international events in Argentina.

=== Management ===
Since 1998, the Santa Fe Athletics Federation had been in charge of managing the CARD (High-Performance Sports Center), and despite the fact that at times the problems seemed insurmountable, it spearheaded the restoration of the facilities and equipment.

=== Incidents of damages (2003, 2012, and 2016) ===
==== 2003 ====
On the night of 29 April 2003, the Salado River burst into the city of Santa Fe, causing destruction by flooding. The club became flooded beneath almost 3 meters of water.

Recovery was undertaken by the Santa Fe Athletics Federation (who managed CARD until 2008) who on 3 April 2004 reopened the complex, declaring it through a ceremony preceding a celebratory tournament. The renovations included resurfacing the synthetic track, refurbishing the buildings, adding two new synthetic running tracks, constructing a brand-new storage and maintenance workshop, replacing electrical installations and the irrigation system, amongst other modifications.

==== 2012 ====
At noon on 16 December 16 2012, while an international activity was taking place at the IAAF Development Centre in Santa Fe, a storm broke out suddenly.

“The heat was oppressive, but even so, the foreign coaches present (from various South American countries), Olympic athletes [...] were at the Card: while we were on the track, we began to realize the storm that was preparing and before we could leave it broke out with everything and we left in the middle of the wind and rain,”

— Professor Scarpín, El Litoral, 'El Card, expuesto y deteriorado'

Much of the nearby groves were "uprooted" and the facility suffered from "two sets of pole vault uprights were knocked off their bases, and the pitching cages were twisted". Property was damaged with the roof of the materials depot blown off.

==== 2016 ====
On 12 February 2016, a tornado rolled through Santa Fe, uprooted trees and scattering them across the facility's track. Among the equipment, one pole vaulting post was completely destroyed, and others damaged, with the pole vault and high jump mats were hurled over 100 meters, soaked and their covers torn.

=== Renovation (2019) ===
After investing over 86 million pesos, the complex constructed a new weight training and contact sports gym, a multipurpose room, four bathrooms, four changing rooms, cold showers, a new space for the Sports Medical Evaluation Centre, and the remodelling of the Conference Room and classrooms for classes, training and sporting events. It was unveiled on 20 November 2019 at 5:30pm (GMT-3).

Additionally, a heated swimming pool of the Higher Institute of Physical Education (ISEF) and synthetic turf hockey fields (one with water and the other with sand), were built with contributions from the Santa Fe provincial government on the ISEF grounds and in coordination with the Santa Fe Hockey Association, are already in operation.

=== Covid pandemic (2020-2022) ===
As early as 13 July 2020, discussions surrounding a potential reopening neared being formalised, as the facility reached its final inspections. It successfully reopened albeit consistently monitored and supervised by "the Sports Secretariat and the coordination of the various associations and federations".

On 3 August 2020 an arson attack caused the burning of "grasslands" around the pitch, it was extinguished by firefighters and volunteers who were noted for their swiftness in preventing irreparable damage to the infrastructure.

Further renovations came in November 2021, when it was announced that a more than 13 million pesos fence would be erected as a perimeter spanning fence around the facility. Four bidders submitted proposals.

In December 2021, CARD received an investment from the development bank FONPLATA. They provided an individual investment of $4,442,000 (USD) from a total $30 million (USD) budget initiative. The funds were used for further renovations.

By 16 February 2022, restrictions imposed by the Covid-19 pandemic had been completely lifted.

== Alumni ==
- Antonio Pocoví, Olympian sprinter
- Gladys Erbetta, Olympian sprinter
- Lilian Buglia, Olympian sprinter
- Elvio Porta, pitcher
- Juan Ignacio Cerra, Olympian hammer thrower
- Germán Chiaraviglio, Olympian pole vaulter
- Karina Moya, hammer thrower
- Enrique Aguirre, decathlete

== See also ==
- Sport in Argentina
