= Saint Kitts and Nevis at the 2021 Junior Pan American Games =

- IOC code: SKN
- NOC: St. Kitts and Nevis Olympic Committee

in Cali–Valle, Colombia 29 November–2 December, 2021
- Competitors: 3 in 2 sports
- Medals: Gold 0 Silver 1 Bronze 0 Total 1

Junior Pan American Games appearances (overview)
- 2021; 2025

Saint Kitts and Nevis competed at the 2021 Junior Pan American Games in Cali–Valle, Colombia from November 29 to December 2, 2021.

The Saint Kitts and Nevis team of three athletes (one male and two females) who competed in two sports - athletics (track and field) and tennis - was officially named on November 19, 2021. The team won a silver medal during the 100m event.

== Medalists ==
Medal	Name	Sport	Event	Date
Silver	Amya Clarke	Athletics	Women's 100m	1 December

Medals by sport
Athletics	0	1	0	1
Total	0	1	0	1

== Competitors ==
The following is the list of number of competitors (per gender) who participated at the games per sport/discipline.

Sport	Men	Women	Total
Athletics (track and field)	1	1	2
Tennis	0	1	1
Total	1	2	3

== Athletics (track and field) ==
Saint Kitts and Nevis qualified two track and field athletes (one male and one female).

Men
- Tah’j Liburd - 400m

Women
- Amya Clarke - 100m (Won Silver)

== Tennis ==
Saint Kitts and Nevis qualified one female tennis athlete.

Women
- Arina Volitova
