= 2015 South American Junior Championships in Athletics =

XLI South American Junior Championships in Athletics
- Dates: May 30–31
- Host city: Cuenca, Ecuador
- Venue: Pista de Atletismo Jefferson Pérez
- Level: Junior
- Events: 44
- Participation: 245 athletes from 11 nations

The 41st South American Junior Championships in Athletics were held in Cuenca, Ecuador, between May 30–31, 2015.

== Medal summary ==
Complete results are published.

=== Men ===
Event	Gold		Silver		Bronze	
100 metres (wind: +0.1 m/s)	Vitor Hugo dos Santos; Brazil	10.29	Derick Silva; Brazil	10.38	Arturo Deliser; Panama	10.49
200 metres (wind: -0.5 m/s)	Arturo Deliser; Panama	20.86	Derick Silva; Brazil	20.92	Enzo Faulbaum; Chile	21.06
400 metres	Maykon do Nascimento; Brazil	46.73	Anderson Cerqueira; Brazil	47.19	Martín Tagle; Chile	48.12
800 metres	Pedro de Palma Junior; Brazil	1:51.76	Jean Jácome; Ecuador	1:53.03	Cristian Castro; Peru	1:53.54
1500 metres	Rodrigo Valério Silva; Brazil	4:05.83	Yonathan Ichiparra; Peru	4:07.26	Israel Arellano; Ecuador	4:07.67
5000 metres	Jefersón Revelo; Ecuador	15:34.45	Reiner Paucara; Peru	15:36.56	Richard Cálisaya; Peru	15:37.57
10,000 metres	Jefersón Revelo; Ecuador	32:35.46	Richard Cálisaya; Peru	32:59.72	Edson Lima; Peru	33:16.86
3000 metres steeplechase	Gerson Montes de Oca; Ecuador	9:53.00	Danny Guamán; Ecuador	9:54.00	Yonathan Ichiparra; Peru	9:54.28
110 metres hurdles (99.0 cm) (wind: +1.5 m/s) CR	Diego Delmónaco; Chile	13.74	Gastón Sayago; Argentina	13.93	Igor Jeronimo; Brazil	13.95
400 metres hurdles	Mikael de Jesus; Brazil	50.96 CR	Asafe Madai Virgolino; Brazil	51.07	Steven Medina; Ecuador	52.42
High jump	Jeavier Moreno; Venezuela	2.13	Jaime Escobar; Panama	2.11	Guilherme dos Santos; Brazil	2.11
Pole vault	José Rodolfo Pacho; Ecuador	5.15	Bruno Spinelli; Brazil	5.00	Josué Gutiérrez; Peru	4.80
Long jump	Samory Fraga; Brazil	7.62 (w: -1.6 m/s)	Andrés Landeta; Ecuador	7.56 (w: NWI)	Santiago Cova; Venezuela	7.42 (w: -0.2 m/s)
Triple jump	Ulisses Costa; Brazil	16.23 (w: +0.1 m/s)	Leodan Torrealba; Venezuela	15.14 (w: +0.6 m/s)	Santiago Cova; Venezuela	15.03 (w: +0.8 m/s)
Shot put (6 kg)	Santiago Espín; Ecuador	18.68	Welington Morais; Brazil	18.24	Sebastián Lazen; Chile	18.04
Discus throw (1.75 kg)	Cleverson Oliveira; Brazil	57.02	Santiago Espín; Ecuador	53.10	Davi Ferreira Junior; Brazil	52.82
Hammer throw (6 kg)	Joaquín Gómez; Argentina	80.59 CR	Humberto Mansilla; Chile	78.69	Gabriel Kehr; Chile	77.54
Javelin throw	Francisco Muse; Chile	70.18	Pedro Luiz Barros; Brazil	64.62	Sebastián Tapia; Ecuador	62.20
Decathlon (Junior)	Hellerson da Costa; Brazil	7211	César Jofre; Chile	6675	Adrián Almarza; Venezuela	6506
10,000 metres walk	César Rodríguez; Peru	43:04.18	Paolo Yurivilca; Peru	43:04.23	Braulio Morocho; Ecuador	44:15.83
4 × 100 metres relay	Brazil; Paulo André de Oliveira; Derick Silva; Aliffer dos Santos; Rodrigo de Oliveira	39.90	Chile; Luis Cofré; Sebastián Keitel; Nicolás Ahumada; Enzo Faulbaum	40.62	Ecuador; Sebastián Acuña; Carlos Darío Perlaza; Luis Enrique Calvo; Edison Camacho	41.32
4 × 400 metres relay	Brazil; Gabriel dos Santos; Anderson Cerqueira; Alexsandro Vitorino; Maykon do Nascimento	3:08.86	Chile; Nicolás Ahumada; José Manuel del Prado; Martín Tagle; Enzo Faulbaum	3:13.79	Peru; Luis Iriarte; Luis Benza; Mauricio Garrido; José Becerra	3:16.92

=== Women ===
Event	Gold		Silver		Bronze	
100 metres (wind: +1.5 m/s)	Ángela Tenorio; Ecuador	11.09 CR	Evelyn de Paula; Brazil	11.56	Kenya Quiñónez; Ecuador	11.59
200 metres (wind: -0.5 m/s)	Ángela Tenorio; Ecuador	22.84 CR	Vitória Cristina Rosa; Brazil	23.48	Mirna Marques da Silva; Brazil	24.14
400 metres	Thabata de Carvalho; Brazil	54.52	Noelia Martínez; Argentina	55.35	Jimena Copara; Peru	55.83
800 metres	Pietra da Silva; Brazil	2:17.41	Liliane Mariano; Brazil	2:18.54	Katherine Tisalema; Ecuador	2:18.83
1500 metres	Katherine Tisalema; Ecuador	4:41.50	Ruth Cjuro; Peru	4:47.59	Karina Basilio; Peru	4:48.23
3000 metres	Zaida Meneses; Peru	10:08.12	Sheyla Eulogio; Peru	10:12.84	Ericka Panchi; Ecuador	10:21.11
5000 metres	Zaida Meneses; Peru	17:43.21	Ericka Panchi; Ecuador	17:47.65	Sunilda Lozano; Peru	17:55.87
3000 metres steeplechase	Katherine Tisalema; Ecuador	11:03.52	Rina Cjuro; Peru	11:08.08	Luz Olivera; Peru	11:37.12
100 metres hurdles (wind: -0.4 m/s) CR	Clara Marín; Chile	13.48	Triana Alonso; Peru	15.21		
400 metres hurdles	Virginia Villalba; Ecuador	61.13	Leyka Archibold; Panama	61.97	Janiele Leite; Brazil	63.15
High jump	Ana Paula de Oliveira; Brazil	1.86 CR	Jenifer Norberto; Brazil	1.81	Amanda Thaylor; Venezuela	1.79
Pole vault	Robeilys Peinado; Venezuela	4.35	Noelina Madarietta; Argentina	3.90	Juliana Campos; Brazil	3.90
Long jump	Leticia Melo; Brazil	6.17 (w: 0.0 m/s)	Adriana Chila; Ecuador	6.10 (w: 0.0 m/s)	Aries Sánchez; Venezuela	6.00 (w: +1.1 m/s)
Triple jump	Adriana Chila; Ecuador	12.97 (w: +0.7 m/s)	Valeria Quispe; Bolivia	12.92 (w: +1.9 m/s)	Camila Arrieta; Chile	12.61 (w: +0.9 m/s)
Shot put	Grace Conley; Bolivia	14.88	Marcia Henkels; Brazil	13.62	Ginger Quintero; Ecuador	13.53
Discus throw	Catalina Bravo; Chile	47.66	Iara Capurro; Argentina	45.85	Júlia Lavinia Silva; Brazil	42.48
Hammer throw	Elizabeth Mina; Ecuador	55.45	Silvia Pimenta Rodrigues; Brazil	51.34	Katherine Ayoví; Ecuador	49.74
Javelin throw	Laura Melissa Paredes; Paraguay	51.44 CR	Estefanny Chacón; Venezuela	50.81	Valentina Salazar; Chile	49.05
Heptathlon	Fiorella Chiappe; Argentina	5242	Jenifer Norberto; Brazil	5081	Ingrid Ellen da Silva; Brazil	5042
10,000 metres walk	Karla Jaramillo; Ecuador	48:43.94	Stefany Coronado; Bolivia	49:50.74	Odeth Huanca; Bolivia	51:24.89
4 × 100 metres relay	Brazil; Rayane Santos; Mirna da Silva; Evelyn de Paula; Vitória Cristina Rosa	44.67	Ecuador; Jimabel Ferrín; Maribel Caicedo; Kenya Quiñónez; Ángela Tenorio	44.88	Chile; Camila Arrieta; Mónica Mendoza; Clara Marín; María Ignacia Montt	46.23
4 × 400 metres relay	Brazil; Stephanie Guimarães; Janiele Leite; Daysiellen Dias; Thabata de Carvalho	3:47.04	Ecuador; Lilibeth Estupiñán; Lisbeth Guatuña; Virginia Villalba; Tania Caicedo	3:49.92	Peru; Jimena Copara; Deysi Parra; Gabriela Delgado; Denisse Mejía	3:52.01

== Medal table ==
The medal table was published.

* Host nation (Ecuador)

Rank	Nation	Gold	Silver	Bronze	Total
1	Brazil	17	14	8	39
2	Ecuador*	13	8	10	31
3	Chile	4	4	7	15
4	Peru	3	8	11	22
5	Argentina	2	4	0	6
6	Venezuela	2	2	5	9
7	Bolivia	1	2	1	4
7	Panama	1	2	1	4
9	Paraguay	1	0	0	1
Totals (9 entries)		44	44	43	131

== Participation ==
According to an unofficial count, 245 athletes from 11 countries participated, 6 athletes less than the officially published number of 251 comprising also those athletes that did not show.

- Argentina (15)
- Bolivia (8)
- Brazil (56)
- Chile (31)
- Ecuador (65)
- Guyana (2)
- Panama (9)
- Paraguay (5)
- Peru (36)
- Uruguay (2)
- Venezuela (16)
