= Renan Gallina =

Brazilian sprinter (born 2004)

Renan Correa de Lima Gallina
Personal information
- Born: 15 March 2004 (age 22) Maringá, Brazil

Sport
- Sport: Athletics
- Event: Sprint

Achievements and titles
- Personal bests: 100m: 10.01 (Bogotá, 2023); 200m: 20.12 (Cuiaba, 2022)
Medal record
Men's athletics
Representing Brazil
Pan American Games
Gold medal – first place	2023 Santiago	200 m
Gold medal – first place	2023 Santiago	4×100 m relay
South American U20 Championships
Gold medal – first place	2021 Lima	4×100 m relay
Gold medal – first place	2023 Bogotá	100 m
Silver medal – second place	2023 Bogotá	4×100 m relay

Renan Correa de Lima Gallina (born 15 March 2004) is a Brazilian track and field athlete who competes as a sprinter.

== Career ==
From Paraná, in 2022, Correa ran 20.12 for the 200 metres, in Cuiabá. The time was a South American U20 record. He was selected for the 2022 South American Athletics U23 Championship in Cascavel in September 2022. He ran 20.15 seconds to win the gold medal in the 200 metres at the championships.

Gallina ran 10.01 seconds for the 100 metres at the South American U20 Championships, in Bogotá, Colombia in May 2023. The time was a South American U20 record.

In August 2023 he was selected to compete in the U20 Pan American Athletics Championship in Mayagüez. He won gold in the final of the 200 metres with a time of 20.44 seconds.

Competing at the 2023 World Athletics Championships in Budapest, in August 2023, he reached the semi finals with a run of 20.44 seconds in the qualifying heats. In November 2023, Correa won a gold medal in the 200 meters at the Pan American Games held in Santiago, Chile, in a time of 20.37 seconds. At the same event he then won a second gold, running the anchor leg for the winning Brazilian 4 × 100 m relay team.

He ran as part of the Brazilian 4 × 100 m relay team at the 2024 World Relays Championships in Nassau, Bahamas.

He competed in the 200m at the 2024 Paris Olympics, where he reached the semi-finals. He also competed in the men's 4 × 100 m relay at the Games.
