= Athletics at the 2023 Pan American Games – Women's long jump =

Women's long jump at the 2023 Pan American Games
- Venue: Julio Martínez National Stadium
- Dates: October 30
- Competitors: 9 from 6 nations
- Winning distance: 6.66

Medalists
Gold medal	Natalia Linares	Colombia
Silver medal	Eliane Martins	Brazil
Bronze medal	Tiffany Flynn	United States

The women's long jump competition of the athletics events at the 2023 Pan American Games took place on October 30 at the Julio Martínez National Stadium.

== Records ==
Prior to this competition, the existing world and Pan American Games records were as follows:

World record	Galina Chistyakova (URS)	7.52 m	Leningrad, Soviet Union	June 11, 1988
Pan American Games record	Jackie Joyner-Kersee (USA)	7.45 m	Indianapolis, United States	August 13, 1987

== Schedule ==
Date	Time	Round
October 30, 2023	19:00	Final

== Results ==
All marks shown are in meters.

KEY:	q	Fastest non-qualifiers	Q	Qualified	NR	National record	PB	Personal best	SB	Seasonal best	DQ	Disqualified

=== Final ===
The results were as follows:

Rank	Name	Nationality	#1	#2	#3	#4	#5	#6	Mark	Notes
1st place, gold medalist(s)	Natalia Linares	Colombia	4.63	x	6.66	6.41	6.16	6.26	6.66	
2nd place, silver medalist(s)	Eliane Martins	Brazil	6.49	x	x	x	–	–	6.49	
3rd place, bronze medalist(s)	Tiffany Flynn	United States	6.40	x	5.80	6.15	6.14	6.13	6.40	
4	Yuliana Angulo	Ecuador	x	x	6.14	x	6.24	x	6.24	
5	Rocío Muñoz	Chile	6.17	6.15	6.23	x	6.18	x	6.23	
6	Letícia Oro	Brazil	6.19	x	6.02	6.15	–	–	6.19	
7	Paola Fernández	Puerto Rico	5.96	5.97	6.17	x	6.16	6.03	6.17	
8	Ashantie Carr	Belize	5.65	5.89	x	5.70	x	–	5.89	
	Jasmine Todd	United States	x	x	x				NM	
