= Ricardo Montes de Oca =

Venezuelan athlete (born 2006)

Personal information
- Full name: Ricardo David Montes de Oca Suárez
- Born: 22 September 2006 (age 20)

Sport
- Sport: Athletics
- Event: Pole vault

Achievements and titles
- Personal bests: Pole Vault: 5.70 m NR (2026)
Medal record
Representing Venezuela
Men's athletics
Pan American Championships
Silver medal – second place	2026 Medellín	Pole vault
South American Games
Silver medal – second place	2026 Santa Fe	Pole vault
South American Championships
Gold medal – first place	2025 Mar del Plata	Pole vault
Bronze medal – third place	2023 São Paulo	Pole vault
South American Indoor Championships
Gold medal – first place	2024 Cochabamba	Pole vault
Bolivarian Games
Gold medal – first place	2025 Lima-Ayacucho	Pole vault
Junior Pan American Games
Gold medal – first place	2025 Asunción	Pole vault
Pan American U20 Championships
Gold medal – first place	2025 Bogotá	Pole vault
Ibero-American U18 Championships
Gold medal – first place	2023 Lima	Pole vault
South American Youth Games
Gold medal – first place	2022 Rosario	Pole vault
Silver medal – second place	2022 Rosario	Long jump
South American U23 Championships
Gold medal – first place	2024 Bucaramanga	Pole vault
South American U20 Championships
Gold medal – first place	2023 Bogotá	Pole vault
South American U18 Championships
Silver medal – second place	2021 Encarnación	Pole vault

Ricardo David Montes de Oca Suárez (born 22 September 2006) is a Venezuelan pole vaulter. He was South American champion in 2025 and 2024 South American Indoor champion. He represented Venezuela at the 2025 World Athletics Championships. He also holds the Venezuelan national record.

== Biography ==
He is from Barquisimeto in the Venezuelan state of Lara. He became Venezuelan national champion in the pole vault in May 2023. In 2023, he won the pole vault at the 2023 South American U20 Athletics Championships in Bogotá, Colombia.

He won the bronze medal at the senior South American Championships in São Paulo, Brazil, in July 2023, clearing 5.40 metres. In November 2023, he finished tenth at the 2023 Pan American Games in Santiago de Chile with a jump of 5.10 m.

He won the 2024 South American Indoor Championships in Cochabamba, Bolivia, with a height of 5.20 m. He was a finalist at the 2024 World Athletics U20 Championships in Lima, Peru, but did not register a height. He won the gold medal at the 2024 South American U23 Championships in Bucaramanga, Colombia.

Having started studying in the United States and competing for High Point University, he set a South American U-20 indoor record with a jump of the 5.57 meters in Blacksburg, Virginia in January 2025, breaking the previous best mark held by Argentine Germán Chiaraviglio from 2006, and was also the Venezuelan national records in the junior, under-23, and senior categories. He then increased his personal best and national record with a jump of 5.60 metres at the Doc Hale Virginia Tech Invitational in February 2025. He won the gold medal at the 2025 South American Championships in Mar del Plata, Argentina, in April 2025, clearing 5.40 metres.

He won the 2025 Junior Pan American Games in Asunción, Paraguay in August 2025. He competed at the 2025 World Athletics Championships in Tokyo, Japan, in September 2025, without advancing to the final.
