= List of South American under-23 records in athletics =

South American U23 records in the sport of athletics are ratified by the Atletismo Sudamericano, which maintains an official list for such performances, but only in a specific list of outdoor events. Athletics records comprise the best performance of an athlete before the year of their 23rd birthday. Technically, in all under-23 age divisions, the age is calculated "on December 31 of the year of competition" to avoid age group switching during a competitive season.

== Outdoor ==
Key to tables: Awaiting ratification Record not kept by CONSUDATLE Not ratified or later rescinded by CONSUDATLE

=== Men ===
Event	Record	Athlete	Nationality	Date	Meet	Place	Age	Ref..
100 m	9.85 (+1.5 m/s)	Ronal Longa	Colombia	26 June 2026	Pan American Championships	Medellín, Colombia	21 years, 361 days	
200 m	19.81 (−0.3 m/s)	Alonso Edward	Panama	20 August 2009	World Championships	Berlin, Germany	19 years, 255 days	
400 m	44.15	Anthony Zambrano	Colombia	4 October 2019	World Championships	Doha, Qatar	21 years, 260 days	
800 m	1:41.77	Joaquim Cruz	Brazil	26 August 1984		Cologne, Germany	21 years, 167 days	
1500 m	3:35.28	Thiago André	Brazil	2 June 2017	Nijmegen Global Athletics	Nijmegen, Netherlands	21 years, 302 days	
Mile	3:51.99	Thiago André	Brazil	27 May 2017		Eugene, United States	21 years, 296 days	
3000 m	7:43.48	Valentín Soca	Uruguay	17 August 2024		Oulu, Finland	22 years, 24 days	
5000 m	13:23.48	Pedro Marín	Colombia	1 May 2026	Peyton Jordan International	Palo Alto, United States	22 years, 50 days	
10,000 m	28:12.91	Pedro Marín	Colombia	28 March 2026	The TEN	San Juan Capistrano, United States	22 years, 16 days	
Half marathon	1:03:32	Franck de Almeida	Brazil	4 December 2005		Fukuoka, Japan	22 years, 301 days	
Marathon	2:17:27	Franck de Almeida	Brazil	2 May 2004		São Paulo, Brazil	21 years, 86 days	
110 m hurdles	13.40 (+0.8 m/s)	Thiago Resende Ornelas dos Santos	Brazil	11 July 2026	Meeting of Braga	Braga, Portugal	22 years, 72 days	
300 m hurdles	33.98	Matheus Lima	Brazil	26 April 2025	Xiamen Diamond League	Xiamen, China	21 years, 329 days	
400 m hurdles	46.29	Alison dos Santos	Brazil	19 July 2022	World Championships	Eugene, United States	22 years, 46 days	
3000 m steeplechase	8:28.67	Mario Bazán	Peru	16 August 2009	World Championships	Berlin, Germany		
High jump	2.30 m	Hugo Muñoz	Peru	29 October 1995		Lima, Peru		
Pole vault	5.92 m	Thiago Braz	Brazil	24 June 2015		Baku, Azerbaijan		
Long jump	8.29 (±0.0 m/s)	Irving Saladino	Panama	4 June 2005		Seville, Spain		
Triple jump	17.89 A (±0.0 m/s)	João Carlos de Oliveira	Brazil	15 October 1975		Mexico City, Mexico		
Shot put	20.74 m	Nazareno Sasia	Argentina	13 May 2023	Argentinian Championships	Concepción del Uruguay, Argentina	22 years, 128 days	
Discus throw	67.02 m	Claudio Romero	Chile	30 April 2022	Penn Relays	Philadelphia, United States	21 years, 294 days	
Discus throw	68.44 m (Note: exhibition at seaside and carried by seawinds)	Mauricio Ortega	Colombia	22 July 2016	Urban Memorial	Ostend, Belgium	21 years, 353 days	
Hammer throw	76.87 m A	Humberto Mansilla	Chile	29 September 2018	South American U23 Championships	Cuenca, Ecuador	22 years, 130 days	
Javelin throw	83.32 m	Braian Toledo	Argentina	24 August 2015	World Championships	Beijing, China	21 years, 350 days	
Decathlon	8266 pts	Pedro Ferreira Filho	Brazil	23 April 1987	Mt. SAC Relays	Walnut, United States		
Decathlon	100m (wind) / Long jump (wind) / Shot put / High jump / 400m / 110m H (wind) / Discus / Pole vault / Javelin / 1500m							
10,000 m walk (track)	38:44.46	David Hurtado	Ecuador	18 April 2021	Richard Boroto National Grand Prix	Guayaquil, Ecuador	21 years, 362 days	
10 km walk (road)	39:41	David Hurtado	Ecuador	15 April 2017	Ecuadorian Race Walking Championships	Sucúa, Ecuador	17 years, 359 days	
20,000 m walk (track)	1:20:49.13	Matheus Corrêa	Brazil	25 April 2021		Bragança Paulista, Brazil		
20 km walk (road)	1:19:45	Éider Arévalo	Colombia	13 April 2013	Poděbrady Walking	Poděbrady, Czech Republic	20 years, 35 days	
Half marathon walk	1:24:54	Iván Oña	Ecuador	23 May 2026	Gran Premio Cantones de A Coruña de Marcha	A Coruña, Spain	20 years, 87 days	
50 km walk (road)								
4 × 100 m relay	38.99	Carlos Flórez; Enoc Moreno; Óscar Baltán; Ronal Longa	Colombia	21 August 2025	Junior Pan American Games	Asunción, Paraguay	22 years, 87 days 20 years, 324 days 21 years, 261 days 21 years, 52 days	
4 × 400 m relay	3:02.84 A	Lucas Rodrigues; Bruno Benedito; Lucas Vilar; Douglas Hernandes	Brazil	21 July 2019	Pan American U20 Championships	San José, Costa Rica		

=== Women ===
Event	Record	Athlete	Nationality	Date	Meet	Place	Age	Ref..
100 m	10.99 (+0.9 m/s)	Ángela Tenorio	Ecuador	22 July 2015	Pan American Games	Toronto, Canada	19 years, 176 days	
200 m	22.73 (+1.9 m/s)	Vitória Cristina Rosa	Brazil	15 September 2018	Troféu Brasil Caixa de Atletismo	Bragança Paulista, Brazil	22 years, 246 days	
200 m	22.73 (−0.1 m/s)	Marlet Ospino	Colombia	10 May 2026	Colombian U23 Championships	Armenia, Colombia	21 years, 246 days	
400 m	50.14	Ximena Restrepo	Colombia	5 August 1991	Pan American Games	Havana, Cuba	22 years, 148 days	
800 m	2:00.37	Luciana Mendes	Brazil	8 August 1993		La Chaux-de-Fonds, Switzerland	22 years, 13 days	
1500 m	4:11.71	Carolina Lozano	Argentina	16 May 2016	Ibero-American Championships	Rio de Janeiro, Brazil		
Mile	4:37.35	Lily Alder	Ecuador	8 June 2025	Brooks PR Invitational	Renton, United States	17 years, 193 days	
3000 m	9:12.93	Carolina Lozano	Argentina	30 April 2016		Rosario, Argentina		
5000 m	15:52.27	Érika Olivera	Chile	6 April 1997	South American Championships	Mar del Plata, Argentina	21 years, 92 days	
10,000 m	33:23.12	Érika Olivera	Chile	30 November 1996		Concepción, Chile	20 years, 331 days	
Half marathon	1:14:40	Kelly Inmaculada	Brazil	16 August 1992		Vitoria, Brazil		
Marathon	2:32:42	Márcia Narloch	Brazil	3 March 1991	Los Angeles Marathon	Los Angeles, United States	21 years, 340 days	
100 m hurdles	12.93 (+1.7 m/s)	Maíla Machado	Brazil	7 September 2002		Americana, Brazil	21 years, 228 days	
400 m hurdles	55.15	Chayenne da Silva	Brazil	25 June 2021 (Note: 25 June 2015 by federation source, a typo)	São Paulo State Championships	São Paulo, Brazil	21 years, 140 days	
3000 m steeplechase	9:41.22	Sabine Heitling	Brazil	25 July 2009	London Grand Prix	London, United Kingdom	22 years, 23 days	
High jump	1.96 m	Solange Witteveen	Argentina	8 September 1997		Oristano, Italy	21 years, 214 days	
Pole vault	4.70 m A	Robeilys Peinado	Venezuela	7 June 2018	South American Games	Cochabamba, Bolivia	20 years, 193 days	
Pole vault	4.70 m	Robeilys Peinado	Venezuela	6 September 2019	Memorial Van Damme	Brussels, Belgium	21 years, 284 days	
Pole vault	4.70 m	Robeilys Peinado	Venezuela	29 September 2019	World Championships	Doha, Qatar	21 years, 307 days	
Long jump	6.95 m (−0.1 m/s)	Natalia Linares	Colombia	1 December 2025	Bolivarian Games	Lima, Peru	22 years, 332 days	
Triple jump	15.02 m (−0.4 m/s)	Yulimar Rojas	Venezuela	23 June 2016		Madrid, Spain	20 years, 246 days	
Shot put	19.02 m	Geisa Arcanjo	Brazil	6 August 2012	Olympic Games	London, United Kingdom	20 years, 322 days	
Discus throw	64.21 m	Andressa de Morais	Brazil	10 June 2012	Ibero-American Championships	Barquisimeto, Venezuela		
Hammer throw	72.01 m	Jennifer Dahlgren	Argentina	27 May 2006	NCAA Division I Regional Championships	Greensboro, United States		
Javelin throw	64.17 m	Manuela Rotundo	Uruguay	4 April 2025	Florida Relays	Gainesville, United States	20 years, 259 days	
Heptathlon	6015 pts	Vanessa Chefer Spínola	Brazil	9 September 2012	Brazilian U23 Championship	Maringá, Brazil	22 years, 188 days	
Heptathlon	100m H (wind) / High jump / Shot put / 200m (wind) / Long jump (wind) / Javelin / 800m							
5000 m walk	21:53.8	Yuli Magalí Capcha	Peru	14 May 2011	Grand Prix Internacional de Marcha	Barranco, Peru	16 years, 277 days	
5 km walk (road)	21:43+	Glenda Morejón	Ecuador	8 June 2019	Gran Premio Cantones de Marcha	A Coruña, Spain	19 years, 9 days	
10 km walk (road)	42:58+	Glenda Morejón	Ecuador	8 June 2019	Gran Premio Cantones de Marcha	A Coruña, Spain	19 years, 9 days	
20,000 m walk (track)	1:29:24.61	Glenda Morejón	Ecuador	29 May 2021	South American Championships	Guayaquil, Ecuador	20 years, 364 days	
20 km walk (road)	1:25:29	Glenda Morejón	Ecuador	8 June 2019	Gran Premio Cantones de Marcha	A Coruña, Spain	19 years, 9 days	
35 km walk (road)	2:48:33	Glenda Morejón	Ecuador	5 March 2022	Race Walking Team Championships	Muscat, Oman	21 years, 279 days	
4 × 100 m relay	43.59 A	María Alejandra Murillo; Natalia Linares; Shary Vallecilla; Laura Martínez	Colombia	2 December 2021	Junior Pan American Games	Cali, Colombia		
4 × 400 m relay	3:33.40 A	Maria Victoria de Sena; Marlene Santos; Chayenne da Silva; Tiffani Marinho	Brazil	3 December 2021	Junior Pan American Games	Cali, Colombia	21 years, 300 days 22 years, 210 days	

== Mixed ==
Event	Record	Athlete	Nationality	Date	Meet	Place	Age	Ref.
4 × 400 m relay	3:18.54 A	Chayenne da Silva; Douglas Hernandes; Joao Falcao; Tiffani Marinho	Brazil	4 December 2021	Junior Pan American Games	Cali, Colombia	21 years, 302 days 22 years, 212 days	
