= Lohan Potgieter =

South African rugby union player

- Full name: Lohan Potgieter
- Born: 2001 (age 24–25) South Africa
- Height
- School: Die Hoërskool Menlopark
- University: University of the Free State

Rugby union career
- Position: Flanker
- Current team: Free State Cheetahs
Senior career
Years	Team	Apps	(Points)
2021–	Free State Cheetahs	1	(0)
- Correct as of 26 June 2021

Lohan Potgieter is a South African rugby union player for the Free State Cheetahs. His regular position is flanker.

Potgieter was named in the Free State Cheetahs squad for the 2021 Currie Cup Premier Division. He made his debut for the in Round 2 of the 2021 Currie Cup Premier Division against the Griquas.
