= Alexon Maximiano =

Brazilian javelin thrower

Personal information
- Born: Alexon dos Santos Maximiano; 12 October 1982 (age 43) Manacapuru, Amazonas, Brazil
- Height: 187 cm (6 ft 2 in)

Sport
- Country: Brazil
- Sport: Athletics
- Event: Javelin throw
Medal record
Pan American Games
Bronze medal – third place	2007 Rio de Janeiro	Javelin throw

Alexon dos Santos Maximiano (born 12 October 1982) is a Brazilian former athlete who competed as a javelin thrower.

Born in Manacapuru, Amazonas, Maximiano was based out of Manaus. He was the South American U23 champion in 2004 and qualified for his first Pan American Games in 2007, with a personal best throw of 78.57 m at a meet in Fortaleza. At the Pan American Games, which were held in Rio de Janeiro, he finished with a surprise bronze medal, throwing a best of 75.04 m. He also represented Brazil at the 2007 World Championships in Osaka.
