= Clara Marín =

Chilean track and field athlete (born 1997)

Clara Marin (born 17 March 1997) is a Chilean track and field athlete who specializes in the 100 metres hurdles and 400 metres hurdles.

She won the 2014 South American Youth Championships in Athletics on 400 m hurdles and got second place on the [100 m hurdles. She won the 2015 South American Junior Championships in Athletics on 100 m hurdles, achieving the championship record with a time of 13.48 seconds. She holds the youth and junior Chilean record in the 100 m hurdles and the youth Chilean record of the 400 m hurdles.

== Personal bests ==
Category	100 m hurdles	400 m hurdles
Youth	13.53 (+0.5) Cali, Colombia	1.01.21 Cali, Colombia
Junior	13.48 (-0.4) Cuenca, Ecuador	
Adult	13.48 (-0.4) Cuenca, Ecuador	
