= Nazareno Sasia =

Argentine athletics competitor

Personal information
- Full name: Nazareno Uriel Sasia
- Born: 5 January 2001 (age 25) Cerrito, Entre Ríos Province, Argentina
- Height: 1.95 m (6 ft 5 in)
- Weight: 115 kg (254 lb)

Sport
- Sport: Athletics
- Event: Shot put

Nazareno Uriel Sasia (born 5 January 2001) is an Argentine athlete specialising in the shot put. He represented his country at the 2023 World Championships in Budapest without qualifying for the final. In addition, he has won multiple medals on regional level.

His personal bests in the event are 20.74 metres outdoors (Concepción del Uruguay 2023) and 19.79 metres indoors (Cochabamba 2024). He also has a best of 57.26 metres in the discus (Cascavel 2022).

== International competitions ==
Year	Competition	Venue	Position	Event	Notes
Representing Argentina
2018	South American U18 Championships	Cuenca, Ecuador	1st	Shot put (5 kg)	21.40 m
2018	South American U18 Championships	Cuenca, Ecuador	2nd	Discus throw (1.5 kg)	57.19 m
2018	Youth Olympic Games	Buenos Aires, Argentina	1st	Shot put (5 kg)	43.19 m^{1}
2019	South American U20 Championships	Cali, Colombia	1st	Shot put (6 kg)	19.13 m
2019	South American U20 Championships	Cali, Colombia	3rd	Discus throw (1.75 kg)	53.91 m
2019	Pan American U20 Championships	San José, Costa Rica	4th	Shot put (6 kg)	19.88 m
2019	Pan American U20 Championships	San José, Costa Rica	8th	Discus throw (1.75 kg)	55.37 m
2021	South American Championships	Guayaquil, Ecuador	2nd	Shot put	19.79 m
2021	South American Championships	Guayaquil, Ecuador	4th	Discus throw	53.56 m
2021	South American U23 Championships	Guayaquil, Ecuador	1st	Shot put	19.11 m
2021	South American U23 Championships	Guayaquil, Ecuador	3rd	Discus throw	55.24 m
2021	Junior Pan American Games (U23)	Cali, Colombia	1st	Shot put	20.08 m
2021	Junior Pan American Games (U23)	Cali, Colombia	5th	Discus throw	55.69 m
2022	South American U23 Championships	Cascavel, Brazil	1st	Shot put	19.76 m
2022	South American U23 Championships	Cascavel, Brazil	1st	Discus throw	57.26 m
2022	South American Games	Asunción, Paraguay	3rd	Shot put	19.73 m
2023	South American Championships	São Paulo, Brazil	2nd	Shot put	19.75 m
2023	World Championships	Budapest, Hungary	26th (q)	Shot put	19.51 m
2023	Pan American Games	Santiago, Chile	6th	Shot put	19.69 m
2024	South American Indoor Championships	Cochabamba, Bolivia	2nd	Shot put	19.79 m
2024	Ibero-American Championships	Cuiabá, Brazil	4th	Shot put	20.33 m
2024	Olympic Games	Paris, France	23rd (q)	Shot put	19.33 m

^{1}Aggregate of 21.94 and 21.25
