= Jessica Moreira =

Brazilian hurdler

Personal information
- Nationality: Brazilian
- Born: 16 November 2001 (age 23)

Sport
- Sport: Athletics
- Event: Hurdles

Jessica Moreira (born 16 November 2001) is a Brazilian athlete. She competed in the women's 400 metres hurdles event at the 2019 World Athletics Championships.
