= South American U20 Championships in Athletics =

The South American U20 Championships in Athletics are the South American championships in the sport of athletics which is open for those in the U20 age category (19 years or under). It is organized by the South American Athletics Confederation (Atletismo Sudamericano).

The competition was first held in 1959 in Buenos Aires. It was an annual event from its inaugural year until 1962, at which point it was held every two years. The championships became an annual event again over the period between 1983 and 2003, but reverted to a biennial format from then onwards.

== Awards ==
Medals are awarded for individuals and relay team members for the first three places in each event.

Trophies are awarded to teams in each category (male and female) with the highest total number of cumulative points in the entire competition. In addition, a trophy will be given to the country for the overall title.

A trophy is also presented to both a male and a female athlete for the most outstanding performance.

== Editions ==
	Year	City	Country	Date	Venue
1	1959	Buenos Aires	Argentina	April 18–19	
2	1960	Santiago	Chile	April 30–May 1	
3	1961	Santa Fe	Argentina	October 15–16	Centro de Alto Rendimiento Deportivo Pedro Candioti
4	1962	Lima	Peru	September 21–24	
5	1964	Santiago	Chile	September 24–27	
6	1966	Montevideo	Uruguay	October 9–14	
7	1968	São Bernardo do Campo	Brazil	September 8–14	Estádio Distrital de Vila Euclides
8	1970	Cali	Colombia	October 9–12	Estadio Olímpico Pascual Guerrero
9	1972	Asunción	Paraguay	October 21–25	
10	1974	Lima	Peru	October 9–13	Estadio Nacional
11	1976	Maracaibo	Venezuela	October 13–17	
12	1978	São Paulo	Brazil	December 15–17	
13	1980	Santiago	Chile	October 23–26	
14	1981	Rio de Janeiro	Brazil	October 15–18	
15	1983	Medellín	Colombia	June 9–12	
16	1984	Caracas	Venezuela	October 4–7	
17	1985	Santa Fe	Argentina	November 21–24	Centro de Alto Rendimiento Deportivo Pedro Candioti
18	1986	Quito	Ecuador	September 13–16	Estadio Los Chasquis
19	1987	Santiago	Chile	September 24–27	
20	1988	Cubatão	Brazil	June 30–July 3	
21	1989	Montevideo	Uruguay	June 16–19	
22	1990	Bogotá	Colombia	July 13–15	Estadio El Campín
23	1991	Asunción	Paraguay	June 21–23	
24	1992	Lima	Peru	August 21–23	
25	1993	Puerto La Cruz	Venezuela	June 18–20	
26	1994	Santa Fe	Argentina	September 1–4	Centro de Alto Rendimiento Deportivo Pedro Candioti
27	1995	Santiago	Chile	September 5–7	
28	1996	Bucaramanga	Colombia	June 8–10	
29	1997	San Carlos	Uruguay	June 20–21	
30	1998	Córdoba	Argentina	May 16–17	
31	1999	Concepción	Chile	October 22–23	
32	2000	São Leopoldo	Brazil	October 7–8	University of Unisinos Track club
33	2001	Santa Fe	Argentina	October 11–20	Centro de Alto Rendimiento Deportivo Pedro Candioti
34	2002	Belém	Brazil	August 1–3	Estádio Olímpico do Pará
35	2003	Guayaquil	Ecuador	June 7–8	Estadio Modelo
36	2005	Rosario	Argentina	October 1–2	Estadio Municipal Jorge Newbery
37	2007	São Paulo*	Brazil	June 30-July 1 July 6–8	Estádio Ícaro de Castro Melo
38	2009	São Paulo; Port of Spain**	Brazil; Trinidad and Tobago	July 25–26; July 31–August 2	Estádio Ícaro de Castro Melo; Hasely Crawford Stadium
39	2011	Medellín	Colombia	September 23–25	Estadio Alfonso Galvis Duque
40	2013	Resistencia	Argentina	October 18–20	Polideportivo Jaime Zapata
41	2015	Cuenca	Ecuador	May 29–31	Pista Atlética Jefferson Perez
42	2017	Leonora	Guyana	June 3–4	National Track and Field Centre
43	2019	Cali	Colombia	June 14–16	Estadio Pedro Grajales
44	2021	Lima	Peru	June 9–10	Villa Deportiva Nacional
45	2023	Bogotá	Colombia	May 19–21	El Salitre Coliseum
46	2024	Lima	Peru	July 12–14	Villa Deportiva Nacional
47	2025	Lima	Peru	October 31 – November 2	Villa Deportiva Nacional

* = The Champions for men's 10,000m, both Race Walking and Combined Events were extracted from the classification of the 2007 Pan American Junior Championships.

** = The Champions for men's 10,000m, both Race Walking and Combined Events were extracted from the classification of the 2009 Pan American Junior Championships.

== Medal table (1959-2025) ==
Rank	Nation	Gold	Silver	Bronze	Total
1	Brazil (BRA)	759	580	460	1,799
2	Argentina (ARG)	263	256	303	822
3	Colombia (COL)	171	207	175	553
4	Chile (CHI)	170	211	273	654
5	Venezuela (VEN)	109	169	137	415
6	Ecuador (ECU)	89	86	105	280
7	Peru (PER)	68	100	110	278
8	Uruguay (URU)	20	29	50	99
9	Paraguay (PAR)	12	14	20	46
10	Guyana (GUY)	8	11	18	37
11	Panama (PAN)	8	7	9	24
12	Bolivia (BOL)	4	9	13	26
13	Suriname (SUR)	1	2	6	9
Totals (13 entries)		1,682	1,681	1,679	5,042

== Championship records ==
=== Men ===
Event	Record	Athlete	Nationality	Date	Meet	Place	Ref.
100 m	10.01 A (+1.9 m/s)	Renan Gallina	Brazil	19 May 2023	2023 Championships	Bogotá, Colombia	
200 m	20.54 (+1.1 m/s)	Bruno Pacheco	Brazil	3 August 2002	2002 Championships	Belém, Brazil	
400 m	45.78 A	Alison dos Santos	Brazil	15 June 2019	2019 Championships	Cali, Colombia	
800 m	1:48.53	Simoncito Silvera	Venezuela	13 October 2001	2001 Championships	Santa Fe, Argentina	
1500 m	3:48.42	Thiago do Rosario	Brazil	19 October 2013	2013 Championships	Resistencia, Argentina	
3000 m	8:19.81	Matías Reynaga	Argentina	10 July 2021	2021 Championships	Lima, Peru	
5000 m	14:13.29	Fernando Fernandes	Brazil	1 August 2002	2002 Championships	Belém, Brazil	
10,000 m	29:39.25	Franck de Almeida	Brazil	3 August 2002	2002 Championships	Belém, Brazil	
110 m hurdles (0.99 m)	13.41 A (±0.0 m/s)	José Eduardo Mendes	Brazil	19 May 2023	2023 Championships	Bogotá, Colombia	
400 m hurdles	50.96 A	Hederson Estefani	Brazil	31 May 2015	2015 Championships	Cuenca, Ecuador	
3000 m steeplechase	8:54.51	Mariano Mastromarino	Argentina	13 October 2001	2001 Championships	Santa Fe, Argentina	*
High jump	2.23 m	Alfredo Deza	Peru	17 May 1998	1998 Championships	Córdoba, Argentina	*
Pole vault	5.20 m A	Ricardo Montes de Oca	Venezuela	19 May 2023	2023 Championships	Bogotá, Colombia	
Long jump	7.92 m	Thiago Dias	Brazil	2 August 2002	2002 Championships	Belém, Brazil	
Triple jump	16.52 A (+0.4 m/s)	Arnovis Dalmero	Colombia	15 June 2019	2019 Championships	Cali, Colombia	
Shot put (6 kg)	20.93 m	Nelson Fernandes	Brazil	18 October 2013	2013 Championships	Resistencia, Argentina	
Discus throw (1.75 kg)	62.78 m	Mauricio Ortega	Colombia	19 October 2013	2013 Championships	Resistencia, Argentina	
Hammer throw (6 kg)	80.59 m A	Joaquin Gomez	Argentina	31 May 2015	2015 Championships	Cuenca, Ecuador	
Javelin throw	74.04 m	Braian Toledo	Argentina	22 September 2011	2011 Championships	Medellín, Colombia	
Decathlon	7304 pts	Gonzalo Barroilhet	Chile	1–2 October 2005	2005 Championships	Rosario, Argentina	
Decathlon	100m / Long jump / Shot put / High jump / 400m / 110m H / Discus / Pole vault / Javelin / 1500m						
10000 km walk (track)	39:56.01	Éider Arévalo	Colombia	22 September 2011	2011 Championships	Medellín, Colombia	
4 × 100 m relay	39.63	Rodrigo Rocha; Jackson Da Silva; Flávio Barbosa; Aldemar da Silva	Brazil	25 September 2011	2011 Championships	Medellín, Colombia	
4 × 400 m relay	3:08.35	Pedro Luiz Burmann de Oliveira; Leandro Pitarelli de Araújo; Maicon Almeida dos Santos; Anderson Freitas Henriques	Brazil	25 September 2011	2011 Championships	Medellín, Colombia	

* = assembled from gbrathletics.com (heats not considered)

=== Women ===
Event	Record	Athlete	Nationality	Date	Meet	Place	Ref.
100 m	11.09 A (+1.5 m/s)	Ángela Tenorio	Ecuador	30 May 2015	2015 Championships	Cuenca, Ecuador	
200 m	22.84 A (+0.5 m/s)	Ángela Tenorio	Ecuador	31 May 2015	2015 Championships	Cuenca, Ecuador	
400 m	53.28	Tianna Springer	Guyana	19 May 2023	2023 Championships	Bogotá, Colombia	
800 m	2:05.76	Ana Paula da Silva	Brazil	24 September 2011	2011 Championships	Medellín, Colombia	
1500 m	4:24.53	Carmen Alder	Ecuador	9 July 2021	2021 Championships	Lima, Peru	
3000 m	9:26.51	Carmen Alder	Ecuador	10 July 2021	2021 Championships	Lima, Peru	
5000 m	16:41.34	Sofía Mamani	Peru	9 July 2021	2021 Championships	Lima, Peru	
10,000 m	34:14.4 h	Érika Olivera	Chile	22 September 1994	1994 Championships	Santa Fe, Argentina	*
100 m hurdles	13.48 A (−0.4 m/s)	Clara Marín	Chile	30 May 2015	2015 Championships	Cuenca, Ecuador	
400 m hurdles	57.10 A	Valeria Cabezas	Colombia	16 June 2019	2019 Championships	Cali, Colombia	
3000 m steeplechase	10:14.81	Stefany López	Colombia	10 July 2021	2021 Championships	Lima, Peru	
High jump	1.86 m A	Ana Caetano	Brazil	29 May 2015	2015 Championships	Cuenca, Ecuador	
Pole vault	4.35 m	Robeilys Peinado	Venezuela	30 May 2015	2015 Championships	Cuenca, Ecuador	
Long jump	6.41 m (+1.6 m/s)	Eliane Martins	Brazil	1 October 2005	2005 Championships	Rosario, Argentina	
Triple jump	13.78 m	Keila Costa	Brazil	1 August 2002	2002 Championships	Belém, Brazil	
Shot put (4 kg)	16.67 m	Natalia Duco	Chile	1 July 2007	2007 Championships	São Paulo, Brazil	
Discus throw (1 kg)	55.88 m	Izabela da Silva	Brazil	20 October 2013	2013 Championships	Resistencia, Argentina	
Hammer throw	60.42 m	Mariana García	Chile	4 June 2017	2017 Championships	Leonora, Guyana	
Javelin throw	56.24 m A	Manuela Rotundo	Uruguay	19 May 2023	2023 Championships	Bogotá, Colombia	
Heptathlon	5574 pts	Vanessa Chefer Spínola	Brazil	1/2 August 2009	2009 Championships	Port of Spain, Trinidad and Tobago	
Heptathlon	100m H / High jump / Shot put / 200m / Long jump / Javelin / 800m						
5000 m walk (track)	22:23.84	Ruby Segura	Colombia	1 November 2025	2025 Championships	Lima, Peru	
10,000 m walk (track)	47:10.20 A	Mary Luz Andía	Peru	15 June 2019	2019 Championships	Cali, Colombia	
4 × 100 m relay	44.42	Josiane Valentim; Bárbara Leôncio; Ana Cláudia Lemos; Rosângela Santos	Brazil	30 June 2007	2007 Championships	São Paulo, Brazil	
4 × 400 m relay	3:36.74	Melissa Torres; Janeth Largacha; Evelis Aguilar; Angélica Escobar	Colombia	25 September 2011	2011 Championships	Medellín, Colombia	

* = assembled from gbrathletics.com (heats not considered)

=== Mixed ===
Event	Record	Athlete	Nationality	Date	Meet	Place	Ref.
4 × 400 m relay	3:22.84 A	Vinícius Moura; Camille de Oliveira; Elias Oliveira; Julia Aparecida Rocha	Brazil	20 May 2023	2023 Championships	Bogotá, Colombia	
