= 2026 Pan American Championships in Athletics – Results =

These are the official results of the 2026 Pan American Championships in Athletics which took place on 26, 27 and 28 May 2026 at the Estadio Alfonso Galvis Duque in Medellín, Colombia.

== Men's results ==
=== 100 metres ===
Heats – 26 June
Wind:
Heat 1: +0.8 m/s, Heat 2: -1.4 m/s, Heat 3: -0.4 m/s, Heat 4: -0.2 m/s

Rank	Heat	Name	Nationality	Time	Notes
1	3	Ronal Longa	Colombia	10.00	Q
2	1	Eloy Benitez	Puerto Rico	10.07	Q
3	1	Austin Kresley	Mexico	10.08	q NR
4	4	Carlos Palacios	Colombia	10.13	Q
5	3	Erik Cardoso	Brazil	10.16	q
6	4	Franquelo Pérez	Dominican Republic	10.18	q
7	1	Malachi Murray	Canada	10.28	q
8	2	Eliezer Adjibi	Canada	10.30	Q
9	4	Bryant Álamo	Venezuela	10.31	
10	4	Adrián Canales	Puerto Rico	10.33	
11	3	Alexis Nieves	Venezuela	10.34	
12	1	Felipe Bardi	Brazil	10.36	
13	2	Melbin Marcelino	Dominican Republic	10.39	
14	3	Tomás Villegas	Argentina	10.40	
15	2	Rikkoi Brathwaite	British Virgin Islands	10.41	
16	2	Lucas Villegas	Argentina	10.44	
17	4	Carlos Flórez	Colombia	10.47	
18	4	Arturo Deliser	Panama	10.49	
19	1	Adrián Nicolari	Uruguay	10.53	
20	2	Darren McQueen	Haiti	10.53	
21	3	Kadeem Campbell	Antigua and Barbuda	10.54	
22	2	Juan Pablo Nordetti	Chile	10.62	
23	2	Gerardo Lomeli	Mexico	10.78	
24	1	Yeikell Romero	Nicaragua	10.88	
25	3	Jaime Smith	Panama	10.88	
26	1	Rajon Charles	United States Virgin Islands	10.90	
27	2	Yaraya Doctrine	United States Virgin Islands	11.05	
28	3	Ramiro Álvarez	Honduras	11.08	
29	4	Jah'Quan Creque	United States Virgin Islands	11.39	
	1	José González	Dominican Republic	DQ	FS
	4	Yassir Cruz	Honduras	DNS	

Final – 26 June

Wind: +1.5 m/s

Rank	Lane	Name	Nationality	Time	Notes
1st place, gold medalist(s)	5	Ronal Longa	Colombia	9.85	AR, AU23R
2nd place, silver medalist(s)	4	Eliezer Adjibi	Canada	9.92	PB
3rd place, bronze medalist(s)	3	Eloy Benitez	Puerto Rico	9.98	
4	2	Austin Kresley	Mexico	10.10	
5	7	Erik Cardoso	Brazil	10.20	
6	6	Carlos Palacios	Colombia	10.24	
7	1	Franquelo Pérez	Dominican Republic	10.25	
8	8	Malachi Murray	Canada	10.30	

=== 200 metres ===
Heats – 27 June
Wind:
Heat 1: +0.5 m/s, Heat 2: -0.5 m/s, Heat 3: -2.2 m/s, Heat 4: -1.0 m/s

Rank	Heat	Name	Nationality	Time	Notes
1	2	José Figueroa	Puerto Rico	20.13	Q
2	3	Adrián Canales	Puerto Rico	20.46	Q
3	1	Alexis Nieves	Venezuela	20.48	Q
4	4	José González	Dominican Republic	20.51	Q
5	4	Lucas Vilar	Brazil	20.60	q
6	4	Daniel Londero	Argentina	20.66	q
7	2	Juan Ignacio Ciampitti	Argentina	20.68	q
8	1	Yancarlos Martínez	Dominican Republic	20.75	q
9	3	Yohandris Andújar	Dominican Republic	20.92	
10	4	Jalen Dyett	Antigua and Barbuda	20.93	
11	1	Neiker Abello	Colombia	21.00	
12	4	Gerardo Lomeli	Mexico	21.01	
13	4	Benjamín Aravena	Chile	21.10	
14	2	Eliezer Adjibi	Canada	21.11	
15	2	Kadeem Campbell	Antigua and Barbuda	21.25	
16	3	Darren McQueen	Haiti	21.34	
17	3	Arturo Deliser	Panama	21.35	
18	3	William Batley	Canada	21.43	
19	3	Omar Simpson	United States Virgin Islands	21.51	
20	1	Jaime Smith	Panama	21.60	
21	3	Tomás León	Chile	21.65	
22	2	Adrián Nicolari	Uruguay	21.66	
23	1	Melique García	Honduras	21.96	
24	1	Yeikell Romero	Nicaragua	22.09	
25	1	Rajon Charles	United States Virgin Islands	30.27	
	2	Jah'Quan Creque	United States Virgin Islands	DNF	
	2	Ronal Longa	Colombia	DNS	

Final – 27 June

Wind: -0.4 m/s

Rank	Lane	Name	Nationality	Time	Notes
1st place, gold medalist(s)	5	José Figueroa	Puerto Rico	19.87	NR
2nd place, silver medalist(s)	6	Alexis Nieves	Venezuela	20.34	NR
3rd place, bronze medalist(s)	7	Adrián Canales	Puerto Rico	20.39	
4	1	Juan Ignacio Ciampitti	Argentina	20.42	
5	3	Lucas Vilar	Brazil	20.50	
6	4	José González	Dominican Republic	20.51	
7	8	Daniel Londero	Argentina	20.58	
8	2	Yancarlos Martínez	Dominican Republic	20.66	

=== 400 metres ===
Heats – 26 June

Rank	Heat	Name	Nationality	Time	Notes
1	3	Jhonatan Hoyos	Colombia	45.17	Q PB
2	2	Elián Larregina	Argentina	45.41	Q
3	3	Kelvis Padrino	Venezuela	45.51	Q
4	3	Luis Áviles	Mexico	45.52	q
5	3	Lidio Andrés Feliz	Dominican Republic	45.53	q
6	2	Javier Gómez	Venezuela	45.88	Q
7	1	Gabriel Moronta	Dominican Republic	45.92	Q
8	1	Alejandro Rosado	Puerto Rico	46.54	Q
9	2	Rafeli Romero	Dominican Republic	46.68	
10	1	Tiago da Silva	Brazil	46.82	
11	1	Agustín Pinti	Argentina	46.85	
11	2	Daniel Balanta	Colombia	46.85	
13	3	Ryder Rattee	Canada	46.90	
14	1	Austin Cole	Canada	46.94	
15	2	Vedant Mittal	United States Virgin Islands	52.47	
	2	Jeffrey Cajo	Peru	DNF	
	3	Martín Kouyoumdjian	Chile	DNS	

Final – 28 June

Rank	Lane	Name	Nationality	Time	Notes
1st place, gold medalist(s)	7	Gabriel Moronta	Dominican Republic	44.67	PB
2nd place, silver medalist(s)	3	Javier Gómez	Venezuela	44.96	
3rd place, bronze medalist(s)	5	Jhonatan Hoyos	Colombia	45.38	
4	1	Luis Áviles	Mexico	45.54	
5	4	Kelvis Padrino	Venezuela	45.60	
6	2	Lidio Andrés Feliz	Dominican Republic	45.92	
7	8	Alejandro Rosado	Puerto Rico	47.16	
	6	Elián Larregina	Argentina	DNF	

=== 800 metres ===
28 June

Rank	Heat	Name	Nationality	Time	Notes
1st place, gold medalist(s)	2	Eduardo Moreira	Brazil	1:45.07	
2nd place, silver medalist(s)	2	Abdullahi Hassan	Canada	1:45.17	
3rd place, bronze medalist(s)	1	Ryan Ignaiker López	Venezuela	1:45.90	
4	2	Guilherme Orenhas	Brazil	1:46.40	
5	1	Niko Schultz	Puerto Rico	1:46.53	
6	1	José Antonio Maita	Venezuela	1:46.89	
7	2	Zakary Mama-Yari	Canada	1:47.14	
8	1	Adrián Mendoza	Colombia	1:47.16	PB
9	1	Klaus Scholz	Chile	1:47.28	
10	2	Ferdy Agramonte	Dominican Republic	1:47.52	
11	1	Matías González	Uruguay	1:48.14	NR
12	2	Justin O'Toole	Canada	1:49.72	
	1	Ian Mas	Honduras	DNS	

=== 1500 metres ===
27 June

Rank	Name	Nationality	Time	Notes
1st place, gold medalist(s)	Foster Malleck	Canada	3:40.20	
2nd place, silver medalist(s)	Gerson Montes de Oca	Ecuador	3:44.55	
3rd place, bronze medalist(s)	Camden Gilmore	Paraguay	3:46.23	
4	Diego Lacamoire	Argentina	3:46.26	
5	Iker Sánchez	Mexico	3:51.61	
6	Carlos Vilches	Puerto Rico	3:53.02	
7	Klaus Scholz	Chile	3:54.07	
8	Gonzalo Gervasini	Uruguay	3:59.69	
9	Tayron Reyes	Dominican Republic	4:20.45	
	Ian Mas	Honduras	DNS	

=== 5000 metres ===
26 June

Rank	Name	Nationality	Time	Notes
1st place, gold medalist(s)	Matías Reynaga	Argentina	14:30.53	
2nd place, silver medalist(s)	Carlos San Martín	Colombia	14:46.00	
3rd place, bronze medalist(s)	Iker Sánchez	Mexico	14:49.25	
4	Ramoncito Mejía	Dominican Republic	14:57.97	
5	Víctor Aguílar	Bolivia	15:19.47	
6	Eduardo Garcia	United States Virgin Islands	15:34.88	

=== 10,000 metres ===
28 June

Rank	Name	Nationality	Time	Notes
1st place, gold medalist(s)	Luis Masabanda	Ecuador	29:45.06	
2nd place, silver medalist(s)	Michael Terán	Mexico	30:46.87	
3rd place, bronze medalist(s)	Matías Reynaga	Argentina	31:14.04	
	Víctor Aguílar	Bolivia	DNF	

=== 110 metres hurdles ===
27 June
Wind: -2.5 m/s

Rank	Lane	Name	Nationality	Time	Notes
1st place, gold medalist(s)	2	Marcos Herrera	Ecuador	13.40	
2nd place, silver medalist(s)	6	Rafael Pereira	Brazil	13.42	
3rd place, bronze medalist(s)	7	John Paredes	Colombia	13.44	
4	5	Cristián Rodríguez	Dominican Republic	13.49	
5	3	Eduardo de Deus	Brazil	13.57	
6	4	Gerson Izaguirre	Venezuela	13.83	
7	8	Gino Toscano	Panama	14.85	

=== 400 metres hurdles ===
Heats – 27 June

Rank	Heat	Name	Nationality	Time	Notes
1	2	Dennick Luke	Dominica	48.95	Q
2	2	Yeral Núñez	Dominican Republic	49.05	Q
3	2	Gerald Drummond	Costa Rica	49.31	Q
4	1	Francisco Viana	Brazil	49.35	Q
5	2	Pablo Andrés Ibáñez	El Salvador	49.39	q
6	1	Diemmyx Ríos	Puerto Rico	49.65	Q
7	1	Bruno de Genaro	Argentina	50.26	Q
8	1	Juander Santos	Dominican Republic	50.50	q
9	1	Sebastián Mosquera	Colombia	51.38	
10	2	Neider Abello	Colombia	51.65	
11	1	Malique Smith	United States Virgin Islands	54.50	

Final – 27 June

Rank	Lane	Name	Nationality	Time	Notes
1st place, gold medalist(s)	4	Yeral Núñez	Dominican Republic	48.20	PB
2nd place, silver medalist(s)	3	Gerald Drummond	Costa Rica	48.76	
3rd place, bronze medalist(s)	6	Francisco Viana	Brazil	48.96	
4	5	Dennick Luke	Dominica	49.21	
5	2	Pablo Andrés Ibáñez	El Salvador	49.53	
6	7	Diemmyx Ríos	Puerto Rico	50.23	
7	1	Juander Santos	Dominican Republic	52.00	
8	8	Bruno de Genaro	Argentina	52.54	

=== 3000 metres steeplechase ===
28 June

Rank	Name	Nationality	Time	Notes
1st place, gold medalist(s)	César Gómez	Mexico	8:56.77	
2nd place, silver medalist(s)	Diddier Rodríguez	Panama	8:59.38	
3rd place, bronze medalist(s)	Frank Durán	Colombia	9:02.88	
4	Gerardo Villareal	Mexico	9:03.86	
	Yeferson Cuno	Peru	DNS	

=== 4 × 100 metres relay ===
28 June

Rank	Lane	Nation	Competitors	Time	Notes
1st place, gold medalist(s)	5	Dominican Republic	Franquelo Pérez, Yohandris Andújar, Melbin Marcelino, Yancarlos Martínez	38.34	NR
2nd place, silver medalist(s)	3	Puerto Rico	Miles Lewis, José Figueroa, Adrián Canales, Pedro Rivas	38.40	NR
3rd place, bronze medalist(s)	4	Colombia	Carlos Flórez, John Paredes, Óscar Baltán, Carlos Palacios	38.85	
4	6	Venezuela	Eubrig Maza, Alexis Nieves, David Vivas, Ángel Ramírez	38.96	NR
5	2	Argentina	Lucas Villegas, Juan Ignacio Ciampitti, Daniel Londero, Tomás Villegas	39.18	NR
6	7	Chile	Ignacio Nordetti, Benjamín Aravena, Juan Pablo Nordetti, Tomás León	39.76	

=== 4 × 400 metres relay ===
28 June

Rank	Lane	Nation	Competitors	Time	Notes
1st place, gold medalist(s)	5	Dominican Republic	Lidio Andrés Feliz, Yeral Núñez, Christopher Melenciano, Gabriel Moronta	3:01.20	
2nd place, silver medalist(s)	3	Venezuela	Carlos Zambrano, Kelvis Padrino, Axel Gómez, Javier Gómez	3:01.38	
3rd place, bronze medalist(s)	4	Puerto Rico	José Figueroa, Yariel Pérez, Alejandro Rosado, Jarell Cruz	3:02.22	NR
4	6	Colombia	Neider Abello, Óscar Baltán, Daniel Balanta, Jhonatan Hoyos	3:10.73	

=== Half marathon walk ===
28 June

Rank	Name	Nationality	Time	Notes
1st place, gold medalist(s)	Iván Oña	Ecuador	1:27:03	
2nd place, silver medalist(s)	Ricardo Ortiz	Mexico	1:27:21	
3rd place, bronze medalist(s)	Éider Arévalo	Colombia	1:28:24	
4	Roberto Vásquez	Mexico	1:29:57	
5	Saúl Wamputsrik	Ecuador	1:30:47	
6	Matheus Corrêa	Brazil	1:31:01	
7	Luis Henry Campos	Peru	1:31:33	
8	Ezequiel Arrubla	Colombia	1:32:49	
9	Nicholas Christie	United States	1:34:23	
10	Jeferson Zambrano	Venezuela	1:36:09	
11	Jordan Crawford	United States	1:38:30	
12	Yassir Cabrera	Panama	1:41:44	NR
	Max dos Santos	Brazil	DNF	

=== High jump ===
26 June

Rank	Name	Nationality	1.90	2.00	2.03	2.06	2.09	2.12	2.15	2.20	Result	Notes
1st place, gold medalist(s)	Jair Portillo	Mexico	–	–	o	xo	o	o	xo	xxx	2.15	
2nd place, silver medalist(s)	Juan Ignacio Acosta	Dominican Republic	–	–	–	xo	o	o	xxx		2.12	
3rd place, bronze medalist(s)	Gilmar Correa	Colombia	–	–	o	xo	o	xxo	xxx		2.12	
4	Luis Castro	Puerto Rico	–	o	–	o	xo	xxx			2.09	
5	Tichani Sake	Suriname	o	xxx							1.90	

=== Pole vault ===
28 June

Rank	Name	Nationality	4.80	5.00	5.20	5.30	5.35	5.40	5.50	5.60	5.65	5.75	5.81	5.86	Result	Notes
1st place, gold medalist(s)	Austin Miller	United States	–	–	o	–	o	–	o	o	xxo	xo	o	xxx	5.81	
2nd place, silver medalist(s)	Ricardo Montes de Oca	Venezuela	–	–	o	–	xo	–	o	x–	xx				5.50	
3rd place, bronze medalist(s)	Guillermo Correa	Chile	–	o	o	o	–	x–	xxx						5.30	
4	Samuel Estrada	Colombia	o	xxx											4.80	
	Carlo Cruz	Mexico	xxx												NM	
	Gerson Izaguirre	Venezuela													DNS	

=== Long jump ===
27 June

Rank	Name	Nationality	#1	#2	#3	#4	#5	#6	Result	Notes
1st place, gold medalist(s)	Emiliano Lasa	Uruguay	7.62	–	5.24	7.61	7.67	7.99	7.99	
2nd place, silver medalist(s)	Arnovis Dalmero	Colombia	7.58	x	7.79	7.84	7.83	7.97	7.97	
3rd place, bronze medalist(s)	Will Williams	United States	7.73	7.52	7.69	7.75	x	7.90	7.90	
4	Eubrig Maza	Venezuela	x	x	x	7.40	7.82	x	7.82	
5	Rasheed Miller	Costa Rica	x	7.28	7.51	x	7.27	6.82	7.51	
6	Gerson Izaguirre	Venezuela	7.01	x	–	6.62	7.09	7.17	7.17	
	Jhon Berrío	Colombia							DNS	

=== Triple jump ===
28 June

Rank	Name	Nationality	#1	#2	#3	#4	#5	#6	Result	Notes
1st place, gold medalist(s)	Almir dos Santos	Brazil	x	17.05	x	x	–	17.24	17.24	
2nd place, silver medalist(s)	Elton Petronilho	Brazil	16.28	16.56	16.33	x	16.40	16.28	16.56	
3rd place, bronze medalist(s)	Brandon Green	United States	16.47	16.38w	x	16.22	16.01	x	16.47	
4	Praise Aniamaka	Canada	15.74	16.18w	–	x	x	15.78	16.18w	
5	Leodan Torrealba	Venezuela	15.97w	x	x	x	x	15.48	15.97w	
6	Jhon Valencia	Colombia	x	x	15.42	15.56	15.69	x	15.69	
7	Santiago Theran	Colombia	15.06	15.45	14.27	x	r		15.45	
8	Werson Domigill	Suriname	15.17w	x	x	x	14.92	x	15.17w	
8	Jason Castro	Honduras	x	14.93	x				14.93	
	Brandon Jones	Belize	x	x	x				NM	

=== Shot put ===
26 June

Rank	Name	Nationality	#1	#2	#3	#4	#5	#6	Result	Notes
1st place, gold medalist(s)	Willian Dourado	Brazil	20.00	20.10	19.87	19.98	20.19	20.53	20.53	
2nd place, silver medalist(s)	Juan Carley Vázquez	Cuba	18.83	19.00	x	19.56	19.63	19.26	19.63	
3rd place, bronze medalist(s)	Ronald Grueso	Colombia	17.70	x	17.89	18.91	19.22	x	19.22	PB
4	Djimon Gumbs	British Virgin Islands	17.37	18.11	18.72	18.82	18.93	18.88	18.93	
5	Frankie González	Dominican Republic	x	16.37	16.64	x	x	15.85	16.64	
6	Christopher Johnson	Antigua and Barbuda	x	x	15.29	x	x	14.78	15.29	

=== Discus throw ===
28 June

Rank	Name	Nationality	#1	#2	#3	#4	#5	#6	Result	Notes
1st place, gold medalist(s)	Claudio Romero	Chile	63.32	65.30	63.75	63.67	62.71	x	65.30	
2nd place, silver medalist(s)	Joseph Brown	United States	60.49	61.91	x	57.90	64.04	60.40	64.04	
3rd place, bronze medalist(s)	Juan José Caicedo	Ecuador	59.68	x	61.04	60.46	x	62.33	62.33	
4	Reggie Jagers	United States	58.71	60.65	58.58	x	61.89	x	61.89	
5	Mauricio Ortega	Colombia	60.26	60.44	x	59.10	58.87	59.26	60.44	
6	Lucas Nervi	Chile	59.08	58.67	x	x	60.34	x	60.34	
7	Winston Campbell	Honduras	x	50.53	51.33	51.77	x	52.47	52.47	
	Christopher Johnson	Antigua and Barbuda							DNS	

=== Hammer throw ===
26 June

Rank	Name	Nationality	#1	#2	#3	#4	#5	#6	Result	Notes
1st place, gold medalist(s)	Humberto Mansilla	Chile	74.81	75.38	73.94	x	x	x	75.38	
2nd place, silver medalist(s)	Daniel Haugh	United States	73.00	73.42	74.24	73.96	x	74.56	74.56	
3rd place, bronze medalist(s)	Gabriel Kehr	Chile	73.46	73.84	x	73.76	74.28	x	74.28	
4	Diego del Real	Mexico	72.09	x	x	x	73.50	74.23	74.23	
5	Ronald Mencía	Cuba	74.18	73.56	74.08	73.65	x	x	74.18	
6	Joaquín Gómez	Argentina	63.05	x	71.06	72.98	72.72	73.38	73.38	
7	Jerome Vega	Puerto Rico	x	x	71.61	x	x	x	71.61	
8	Fabián Serna	Colombia	69.15	x	x	68.67	68.87	x	69.15	
9	Miguel Zamora	Cuba	67.55	65.74	x				67.55	
10	Michael Soler	Puerto Rico	x	64.14	x				64.14	
11	José Eduardo Chávez	Mexico	53.44	x	62.73				62.73	

=== Javelin throw ===
28 June

Rank	Name	Nationality	#1	#2	#3	#4	#5	#6	Result	Notes
1st place, gold medalist(s)	Lars Flaming	Paraguay	78.83	80.39	82.10	76.75	x	80.61	82.10	PB
2nd place, silver medalist(s)	Marc Minichello	United States	73.75	80.91	81.36	76.74	70.44	72.12	81.36	
3rd place, bronze medalist(s)	Pedro Henrique Rodrigues	Brazil	78.96	x	76.06	78.40	x	x	78.96	
4	Iván Sibaja	Costa Rica	74.24	74.97	74.17	77.89	72.91	74.92	77.89	NR
5	Billy Julio	Colombia	70.72	75.42	74.55	77.61	74.28	76.66	77.61	
6	Santiago Pimentel	Colombia	x	x	70.71	70.43	71.82	x	71.82	

== Women's results ==
=== 100 metres ===
Heats – 26 June
Wind:
Heat 1: +0.1 m/s, Heat 2: +2.7 m/s, Heat 3: -0.4 m/s

Rank	Heat	Name	Nationality	Time	Notes
1	2	Liranyi Alonso	Dominican Republic	10.93	Q
2	2	Ana Carolina Azevedo	Brazil	10.94	Q
3	1	Sade McCreath	Canada	11.14	Q
4	2	Frances Colón	Puerto Rico	11.17	q
5	1	Gladymar Torres	Puerto Rico	11.18	Q
6	1	Orangys Jiménez	Venezuela	11.19	q =NR
7	3	Gabriela Mourão	Brazil	11.32	Q
7	2	Mariandrée Chacón	Guatemala	11.34	
9	3	Glanyernis Guerra	Venezuela	11.34	Q
10	2	María Montt	Chile	11.40	
11	3	Cecilia Tamayo	Mexico	11.42	
12	3	Fiordaliza Cofil	Dominican Republic	11.51	
13	1	Patricia Sine	Dominican Republic	11.66	
14	3	Anaís Hernández	Chile	11.67	
15	3	Saraiah Walkes	United States Virgin Islands	11.71	
16	1	Soniya Jones	Antigua and Barbuda	11.78	
17	1	Rori Lowe	Honduras	11.90	
18	1	María Alejandra Carmona	Nicaragua	11.91	
	2	María Maturana	Colombia	DNF	

Final – 26 June

Wind: +0.4 m/s

Rank	Lane	Name	Nationality	Time	Notes
1st place, gold medalist(s)	4	Sade McCreath	Canada	11.10	
2nd place, silver medalist(s)	6	Ana Carolina Azevedo	Brazil	11.16	
3rd place, bronze medalist(s)	3	Liranyi Alonso	Dominican Republic	11.18	
4	7	Gladymar Torres	Puerto Rico	11.22	
5	5	Gabriela Mourão	Brazil	11.33	
6	1	Frances Colón	Puerto Rico	11.33	
7	8	Orangys Jiménez	Venezuela	11.36	
8	2	Glanyernis Guerra	Venezuela	11.40	

=== 200 metres ===
Heats – 27 June
Wind:
Heat 1: -1.4 m/s, Heat 2: +0.8 m/s, Heat 3: +2.6 m/s

Rank	Heat	Name	Nationality	Time	Notes
1	1	Audrey Leduc	Canada	22.80	Q
2	2	Estrella de Aza	Dominican Republic	22.99	Q
3	1	Liranyi Alonso	Dominican Republic	23.01	Q
4	1	Nicole Caicedo	Ecuador	23.11	q
5	3	Cecilia Tamayo	Mexico	23.13	Q
6	2	Ana Carolina Azevedo	Brazil	23.16	Q
7	3	Beyoncé Defreitas	British Virgin Islands	23.17	Q
8	2	Anahí Suárez	Ecuador	23.24	q
9	3	Mariandrée Chacón	Guatemala	23.25	
10	3	Cristal Cuervo	Panama	23.30	
11	1	Gabriela Mourão	Brazil	23.58	
12	3	Darianny Jiménez	Dominican Republic	23.88	
13	2	María Alejandra Carmona	Nicaragua	23.91	
14	1	Rori Lowe	Honduras	24.46	
15	2	Soniya Jones	Antigua and Barbuda	24.49	
	2	Orangys Jiménez	Venezuela	DQ	FS
	1	María Maturana	Colombia	DNS	

Final – 27 June

Wind: -1.3 m/s

Rank	Lane	Name	Nationality	Time	Notes
1st place, gold medalist(s)	6	Audrey Leduc	Canada	22.64	
2nd place, silver medalist(s)	1	Nicole Caicedo	Ecuador	23.06	
3rd place, bronze medalist(s)	4	Ana Carolina Azevedo	Brazil	23.10	
4	3	Liranyi Alonso	Dominican Republic	23.13	
5	5	Estrella de Aza	Dominican Republic	23.19	
6	8	Beyoncé Defreitas	British Virgin Islands	23.21	
7	2	Anahí Suárez	Ecuador	23.27	
8	7	Cecilia Tamayo	Mexico	23.41	

=== 400 metres ===
Heats – 26 June

Rank	Heat	Name	Nationality	Time	Notes
1	1	Gabby Scott	Puerto Rico	51.43	Q
2	2	Lauren Gale	Canada	51.62	Q
3	1	Lina Licona	Colombia	51.75	Q
4	2	Andrea Rivera	Puerto Rico	51.91	Q
5	1	Zoe Sherar	Canada	52.09	Q
6	2	Ella Clayton	Canada	52.50	Q
7	2	María Florencia Lamboglia	Argentina	52.97	q
8	2	Milagros Durán	Dominican Republic	53.15	q
9	2	Noelia Martínez	Argentina	53.49	
10	1	Cristal Cuervo	Panama	53.70	
11	1	Anabel Medina	Dominican Republic	55.55	
	1	Ana Torin	Venezuela	DNS	

Final – 28 June

Rank	Lane	Name	Nationality	Time	Notes
1st place, gold medalist(s)	6	Lauren Gale	Canada	50.68	
2nd place, silver medalist(s)	5	Gabby Scott	Puerto Rico	50.69	
3rd place, bronze medalist(s)	4	Lina Licona	Colombia	50.75	PB
4	3	Zoe Sherar	Canada	51.22	
5	8	Ella Clayton	Canada	51.60	
6	7	Andrea Rivera	Puerto Rico	51.81	
7	1	María Florencia Lamboglia	Argentina	52.78	
8	2	Milagros Durán	Dominican Republic	53.46	

=== 800 metres ===
28 June

Rank	Name	Nationality	Time	Notes
1st place, gold medalist(s)	Daily Cooper Gaspar	Cuba	1:56.10	PB
2nd place, silver medalist(s)	Meghan Hunter	United States	1:58.93	
3rd place, bronze medalist(s)	Maeliss Trapeau	Canada	1:59.54	
4	Avery Pearson	Canada	2:01.36	
5	Aurora Rynda	Canada	2:02.34	
6	Mayara Leite	Brazil	2:03.61	
7	Veronica Ángel	Mexico	2:06.54	
8	Mikaela Smith	United States Virgin Islands	2:10.30	
9	Déborah Rodríguez	Uruguay	2:11.31	
10	Angeline Pondler	Costa Rica	2:15.02	
	Valeria Cabezas	Colombia	DNS	
	Sabrina Pena	Brazil	DNS	

=== 1500 metres ===
27 June

Rank	Name	Nationality	Time	Notes
1st place, gold medalist(s)	Daily Cooper Gaspar	Cuba	4:22.72	
2nd place, silver medalist(s)	Micaela Levaggi	Argentina	4:24.14	
3rd place, bronze medalist(s)	Carmen Alder	Ecuador	4:25.28	
4	Lorena Rangel	Mexico	4:25.31	
5	Benita Parra	Bolivia	4:35.41	
	Dafne Juárez	Mexico	DNS	

=== 5000 metres ===
26 June

Rank	Name	Nationality	Time	Notes
1st place, gold medalist(s)	Anisleidis Ochoa	Cuba	16:37.48	
2nd place, silver medalist(s)	Veronica Huacasi	Peru	16:39.00	
3rd place, bronze medalist(s)	Benita Parra	Bolivia	16:40.79	
4	Sabrina Salcedo	Mexico	16:45.08	
5	Dafne Juárez	Mexico	17:25.26	

=== 10,000 metres ===
28 June

Rank	Name	Nationality	Time	Notes
1st place, gold medalist(s)	Viviana Aroche	Guatemala	34:41.95	
2nd place, silver medalist(s)	Mary Granja	Ecuador	34:42.90	
3rd place, bronze medalist(s)	Nélida Peñaflor	Argentina	34:45.14	
4	Gladys Tejeda	Peru	34:47.73	
	Mariel Salazar	Mexico	DNF	

=== 100 metres hurdles ===
Heats – 27 June
Wind:
Heat 1: +1.0 m/s, Heat 2: +0.1 m/s

Rank	Heat	Name	Nationality	Time	Notes
1	2	Vitória Alves	Brazil	12.74	Q
2	1	Micaela de Mello	Brazil	12.90	Q
3	2	Tatiana Aholou	Canada	12.91	Q
4	1	Paola Vázquez	Puerto Rico	12.97	Q
5	1	Catalina Rozas	Chile	13.27	Q NR
6	2	Martha Araújo	Colombia	13.39	Q
7	1	Deya Erikson	British Virgin Islands	13.41	q
8	2	Yesi Tejeda	Dominican Republic	13.74	q
9	2	Leyka Archibold	Panama	13.90	
10	1	Tamara Abad	Dominican Republic	14.03	
11	1	Mariel Brokke	Costa Rica	14.04	

Final – 27 June

Wind: +1.0 m/s

Rank	Lane	Name	Nationality	Time	Notes
1st place, gold medalist(s)	5	Vitória Alves	Brazil	12.59	
2nd place, silver medalist(s)	6	Tatiana Aholou	Canada	12.69	
3rd place, bronze medalist(s)	4	Micaela de Mello	Brazil	12.90	
4	3	Paola Vázquez	Puerto Rico	12.97	
5	2	Catalina Rozas	Chile	13.27	=NR
6	7	Martha Araújo	Colombia	13.40	
7	1	Deya Erikson	British Virgin Islands	13.41	
8	8	Yesi Tejeda	Dominican Republic	13.47	

=== 400 metres hurdles ===
Heats – 27 June

Rank	Heat	Name	Nationality	Time	Notes
1	1	Michelle Smith	United States Virgin Islands	55.88	Q
2	2	Yara Amador	Mexico	55.89	Q
3	1	Bianca Stubler	United States	56.67	Q
3	2	Grace Claxton	Puerto Rico	56.67	Q
5	2	María Alejandra Rocha	Colombia	56.93	Q
6	1	Chayenne da Silva	Brazil	57.06	Q
7	2	Camille de Oliveira	Brazil	57.51	q
8	1	Daniela Rojas	Costa Rica	57.77	q
9	1	Evelin del Carmen	Dominican Republic	58.52	
10	2	Franshina Martínez	Dominican Republic	58.53	
11	1	Leyka Archibold	Panama	1:02.31	

Final – 27 June

Rank	Lane	Name	Nationality	Time	Notes
1st place, gold medalist(s)	5	Michelle Smith	United States Virgin Islands	54.93	
2nd place, silver medalist(s)	7	Grace Claxton	Puerto Rico	55.14	
3rd place, bronze medalist(s)	4	Bianca Stubler	United States	55.34	
4	6	Yara Amador	Mexico	55.43	
5	1	Camille de Oliveira	Brazil	56.19	
6	2	Daniela Rojas	Costa Rica	56.76	
7	3	María Alejandra Rocha	Colombia	57.05	
8	8	Chayenne da Silva	Brazil	57.40	

=== 3000 metres steeplechase ===
28 June

Rank	Name	Nationality	Time	Notes
1st place, gold medalist(s)	Micaela Levaggi	Argentina	9:46.90	
2nd place, silver medalist(s)	Veronica Huacasi	Peru	10:01.57	
3rd place, bronze medalist(s)	Sabrina Salcedo	Mexico	10:16.69	
4	Arian Chia	Mexico	10:43.36	
5	Stefany López	Colombia	11:03.73	
	Anisleidis Ochoa	Cuba	DNF	

=== 4 × 100 metres relay ===
28 June

Rank	Lane	Nation	Competitors	Time	Notes
1st place, gold medalist(s)	6	Dominican Republic	Patricia Sine, Fiordaliza Cofil, Estrella de Aza, Liranyi Alonso	43.29	
2nd place, silver medalist(s)	4	Puerto Rico	Adanelys Rodríguez, Gladymar Torres, Legna Echevarría, Frances Colón	43.42	NR
3rd place, bronze medalist(s)	7	Chile	Macarena Borie, María Montt, Anaís Hernández, Belén Ituarte	44.05	
4	3	Mexico	Matilde Ochoa, Alejandra Ortiz, Paola Ascencio, Cecilia Tamayo	44.33	NR
5	5	Colombia	María Alejandra Rocha, Angélica Gamboa, Danna Banquez, Yajaira Murillo	44.37	

=== 4 × 400 metres relay ===
28 June

Rank	Lane	Nation	Competitors	Time	Notes
1st place, gold medalist(s)	5	Colombia	Paola Loboa, Melany Bolaño, María Alejandra Rocha, Lina Licona	3:29.49	NR
2nd place, silver medalist(s)	6	Dominican Republic	Evelin del Carmen, Milagros Durán, Franshina Martínez, Estrella de Aza	3:31.40	

=== Half marathon walk ===
28 June

Rank	Name	Nationality	Time	Notes
1st place, gold medalist(s)	Evelyn Inga	Peru	1:35:34	
2nd place, silver medalist(s)	Glenda Morejón	Ecuador	1:35:44	PB
3rd place, bronze medalist(s)	Alejandra Ortega	Mexico	1:38:09	
4	Nathaly León	Ecuador	1:39:13	
5	Ilse Guerrero	Mexico	1:47:50	
6	Sharon Herrera	Costa Rica	1:49:58	
7	Katie Burnett	United States	1:55:10	
	Viviane Lyra	Brazil	DNF	
	Ruby Ray	United States	DNF	
	Milangela Rosales	Venezuela	DNF	
	Lucy Mendoza	Colombia	DNS	

=== High jump ===
28 June

Rank	Name	Nationality	1.65	1.70	1.75	1.78	1.81	1.84	1.86	1.90	1.92	1.94	Result	Notes
1st place, gold medalist(s)	Marysabel Senyu	Dominican Republic	–	–	o	–	o	o	o	o	xo	xxx	1.92	
2nd place, silver medalist(s)	María Arboleda	Colombia	–	–	o	xo	o	xo	xxx				1.84	
3rd place, bronze medalist(s)	Hellen Tenorio	Colombia	–	o	o	o	o	xxx					1.81	SB
4	Emma Gates	United States	–	–	o	o	xxx						1.78	
5	Claudina Díaz	Mexico	o	o	xo	o	xxx						1.78	
6	Lorena Aires	Uruguay	o	xxo	xxx								1.70	

=== Pole vault ===
26 June

Rank	Name	Nationality	3.40	3.60	3.80	3.90	4.00	4.10	4.20	4.30	4.35	4.45	4.60	Result	Notes
1st place, gold medalist(s)	Juliana Campos	Brazil	–	–	o	–	o	o	o	o	–	xo	xxx	4.45	
2nd place, silver medalist(s)	Alyssa Quiñones	Puerto Rico	–	–	–	–	xo	xo	o	xxx				4.20	
3rd place, bronze medalist(s)	Jennifer Elizarov	Canada	–	–	–	–	–	xo	xxo	–	xxx			4.20	
4	Andrea Velasco	Mexico	–	–	–	xxo	o	xxx						4.00	
5	Katherine Castillo	Colombia	–	–	–	xxo	xo	xxx						4.00	
6	Luna Pabón	Colombia	–	–	–	–	xxo	xxx						4.00	
7	Alisandra Negrete	Mexico	–	–	–	xo	xxo	xxx						4.00	
8	Andrea Velasco	El Salvador	o	o	xxx									3.60	

=== Long jump ===
26 June

Rank	Name	Nationality	#1	#2	#3	#4	#5	#6	Result	Notes
1st place, gold medalist(s)	Alysbeth Félix	Puerto Rico	6.49	x	6.64	6.56	6.56	6.36	6.64	
2nd place, silver medalist(s)	Nathalee Aranda	Panama	6.57	6.49	6.50	6.29	x	6.55	6.57	
3rd place, bronze medalist(s)	Paola Fernández	Puerto Rico	6.49	6.34	6.28	6.38	6.29	6.25	6.49	
4	Martha Araújo	Colombia	6.26	6.47	6.30	6.18	6.37	6.28	6.47	
5	Leticia Oro Melo	Brazil	5.11	6.39	6.34	6.30	6.40	6.34	6.40	
6	Eliane Martins	Brazil	5.95	x	5.90	x	x	6.05	6.05	
7	Thelma Fuentes	Guatemala	x	5.51	6.00	5.76	5.17	6.02	6.02	
8	Ornelis Ortiz	Venezuela	5.93	5.71	5.81	x	x	–	5.93	

=== Triple jump ===
28 June

Rank	Name	Nationality	#1	#2	#3	#4	#5	#6	Result	Notes
1st place, gold medalist(s)	Gabriele dos Santos	Brazil	14.03	14.18	13.82	14.17	x	14.09	14.18	
2nd place, silver medalist(s)	Regiclecia da Silva	Brazil	x	13.54	x	x	13.79	x	13.79	
3rd place, bronze medalist(s)	Mylana Hearn	United States	13.75	13.42	13.41	13.34	12.97	13.11	13.75	
4	Euphenie Andre	United States	13.73	13.70	13.65	13.33	13.51	13.48	13.73	
5	Nerli Cantoñi	Colombia	12.86	13.22	12.90	12.91	12.68	13.12	13.22	
6	Paola del Real	Mexico	12.59	x	13.03	11.66	12.94	x	13.03	
7	Thelma Fuentes	Guatemala	x	12.71	12.79	12.24	x	12.86	12.86	
8	Danisha Chimilio	Guatemala	x	12.73	12.50	12.30	12.52w	x	12.73	
9	Ornelis Ortiz	Venezuela	x	12.71	12.59				12.71	

=== Shot put ===
26 June

Rank	Name	Nationality	#1	#2	#3	#4	#5	#6	Result	Notes
1st place, gold medalist(s)	Dianelis Delís	Cuba	17.75	17.64	x	17.85	18.12	x	18.12	
2nd place, silver medalist(s)	Ivana Gallardo	Chile	17.04	17.25	16.92	17.10	x	17.58	17.58	
3rd place, bronze medalist(s)	Rosa Ramírez	Dominican Republic	17.15	17.20	x	17.41	17.35	17.45	17.45	
4	Liv Sands	Canada	14.75	16.32	16.74	16.87	16.93	x	16.93	
5	Belsy Quiñónez	Ecuador	x	16.92	x	16.30	x	16.45	16.92	
6	Melanie Duron	Mexico	15.85	x	x	x	15.55	x	15.85	
7	Prizila Negrete	Honduras	12.29	12.26	12.18	12.15	12.40	12.11	12.40	

=== Discus throw ===
26 June

Rank	Name	Nationality	#1	#2	#3	#4	#5	#6	Result	Notes
1st place, gold medalist(s)	Andressa de Morais	Brazil	58.55	58.87	x	x	58.05	58.63	58.87	
2nd place, silver medalist(s)	Yerlin Mesa	Colombia	50.46	53.27	54.11	54.91	50.57	55.92	55.92	SB
3rd place, bronze medalist(s)	Isabella Mosquera	Colombia	52.91	48.54	x	x	45.50	50.03	52.91	
4	Yosiris Córdoba	Colombia	45.34	x	x	x	49.89	48.95	49.89	
	Michaelle Valentin	Haiti							DNS	

=== Hammer throw ===
28 June

Rank	Name	Nationality	#1	#2	#3	#4	#5	#6	Result	Notes
1st place, gold medalist(s)	Jillian Weir	Canada	67.32	68.57	x	70.37	70.28	69.16	70.37	
2nd place, silver medalist(s)	Jinaye Shomachuk	Canada	62.23	68.54	x	70.13	x	67.23	70.13	
3rd place, bronze medalist(s)	Ximena Zorrilla	Peru	66.13	66.43	x	x	69.39	x	69.39	SB
4	Mayra Gaviria	Colombia	x	67.21	66.87	62.78	68.62	66.16	68.62	
5	Yarielis Torres	Puerto Rico	63.66	x	65.35	64.24	64.87	x	65.35	
6	Mariana García	Chile	62.72	x	x	x	61.19	59.65	62.72	
7	Elvia Canela	Mexico	x	61.74	x	62.23	x	62.28	62.28	
8	Gabrielle Figueroa	Honduras	x	53.04	x	x	57.13	53.84	57.13	

=== Javelin throw ===
27 June

Rank	Name	Nationality	#1	#2	#3	#4	#5	#6	Result	Notes
1st place, gold medalist(s)	Valentina Barrios	Colombia	58.86	58.91	x	60.72	52.81	56.89	60.72	SB
2nd place, silver medalist(s)	Luz Castro	Mexico	51.34	50.61	51.98	50.82	52.17	51.43	52.17	
3rd place, bronze medalist(s)	Ariana Ince	United States	51.11	48.81	x	51.69	x	x	51.69	
4	Yessi Tejada	Dominican Republic	48.40	45.99	41.91	49.53	49.97	51.31	51.31	
5	Esther Padilla	Honduras	x	40.56	41.17	43.16	45.16	43.69	45.16	
	Yiset Jiménez	Colombia							DNS	

=== Heptathlon ===
27–28 June

The highest mark recorded in each event is highlighted in yellow

Rank	Athlete	Nationality	100m H	HJ	SP	200m	LJ	JT	800m	Points	Notes
1st place, gold medalist(s)	María Fernanda Murillo	Colombia	12.74 NR	1.83	12.01	23.05	6.11	39.24	2:14.10	6357	PB
2nd place, silver medalist(s)	Sienna MacDonald	Canada	13.23	1.62	11.96	24.39	6.11	48.00	2:20.30	5974	SB
3rd place, bronze medalist(s)	Madisson Lawrence	Canada	13.71	1.80	11.39	24.09	6.08	29.54	2:10.04	5897	
4	Marienger Chirinos	Venezuela	14.23	1.65	11.80	24.43	5.55	33.83	2:19.34	5425	
5	Damaris Palomeque	Colombia	14.36	1.62	11.97	24.40	5.31	27.81	2:22.99	5152	SB
6	Abigail Obando	Costa Rica	15.09	1.71	9.87	24.08	5.05	31.77	2:21.69	5075	

== Mixed results ==
=== 4 × 100 metres relay ===
27 June

Rank	Lane	Nation	Competitors	Time	Notes
1st place, gold medalist(s)	5	Dominican Republic	Yohandris Andújar, Fiordaliza Cofil, Melbin Marcelino, Liranyi Alonso	40.92	NR
2nd place, silver medalist(s)	4	Brazil	Erik Cardoso, Gabriela Mourão, Felipe Bardi, Ana Carolina Azevedo	41.55	
3rd place, bronze medalist(s)	3	Colombia	Carlos Flórez, Angélica Gamboa, Óscar Baltán, Danna Banquez	41.63	NR
4	2	Venezuela	Bryant Álamo, Orangys Jiménez, Alexis Nieves, Glanyernis Guerra	42.00	NR
	6	Puerto Rico	Eloy Benitez, Gladymar Torres, Adrian Canales, Frances Colón	DNF	
	7	Mexico	Austin Kresley, Paola Ascencio, Gerardo Lomeli, Cecilia Tamayo	DQ	TR17.2.3

=== 4 × 400 metres relay ===
26 June

Rank	Lane	Nation	Competitors	Time	Notes
1st place, gold medalist(s)	5	Dominican Republic	Erick Sánchez, Anabel Medina, Christopher Melenciano, Estrella de Aza	3:13.83	SB
2nd place, silver medalist(s)	4	Colombia	Daniel Balanta, Melany Bolaño, Jhonatan Hoyos, Lina Licona	3:15.36	SB
3rd place, bronze medalist(s)	6	Puerto Rico	Yariel Pérez, Adanelys Rodríguez, Jarell Cruz, Andrea Rivera	3:16.07	NR
4	7	Argentina	Agustín Pinti, María Florencia Lamboglia, Elián Larregina, Noelia Martínez	3:17.55	NR
5	3	United States Virgin Islands	Malique Smith, Saraiah Walkes, Omar Simpson, Michelle Smith	3:19.44	NR
