= Frances Colón (sprinter) =

Puerto Rican athlete (born 2006)

Personal information
- Born: Frances Colón Vazquez; 16 March 2006 (age 20)

Sport
- Sport: Athletics
- Event: Sprint

Achievements and titles
- Personal bests: 60m: 7.38 (2026); 100m: 11.26 (2026); 200m: 23.46 (2026)
Medal record
Women's athletics
Representing Puerto Rico
Pan American Championships
Silver medal – second place	2026 Medellín	4×100 m relay
Ibero-American Championships
Gold medal – first place	2026 Lima	4×100 m relay
NACAC U23 Championships
Bronze medal – third place	2026 Tlaxcala	200 m
NACAC U18 Championships
Silver medal – second place	2023 San José	100 m
Bronze medal – third place	2023 San José	200 m
Junior Pan American Games
Bronze medal – third place	2025 Asunción	100 m
Pan American U20 Championships
Gold medal – first place	2025 Bogotá	4×100 m relay
Silver medal – second place	2025 Bogotá	100 m
Silver medal – second place	2025 Bogotá	200 m

Frances Colón Vazquez (born 16 March 2006) is a Puerto Rican sprinter.

== Biography ==
From Ponce, and a student at Inter-American University of Puerto Rico, Frances Colón Vazquez placed second to Kaila Jackson in her heat of the 100 metres at the 2023 Pan American U20 Athletics Championships, prior to placing fourth in the final. She became the Puerto Rican U18 record holder over both 100 metres and 200 metres.

Colón won the bronze medal in the 100 metres at the 2025 Pan American Junior Games in Asunción, Paraguay in August 2025, finishing behind Shaniqua Bascombe and Liranyi Alonso and in a photo finish with Jamaican Serena Cole. It was Puerto Rico's first ever medal in the event and the first time a Puerto Rican sprinter had won a medal at any Pan American Games, in adult and youth categories. Later that year, she won silver medals in both the 100 metres and 200 metres at the 2025 Pan American U20 Athletics Championships in Bogotá, also winning a gold medal in the 4 x 100 m relay as the team set a national U20 record of 44.58 seconds.

In May 2026, she ran a personal best 11.26 seconds for the 100 metres at the 2026 Ibero-American Championships in Athletics, placing seventh in the final. At the championships she won a bronze medal with Eloy Benitez, Adrian Canales and Gladymar Torres in the mixed 4 x 100 metres relay. She was also part of the gold medal winning women's 4 x 100 metres relay team at the championships alongside Torres, Adanelys Rodríguez, and Legna Echevarría, running 43.78 seconds. In June 2026, the same quartet won the silver medal in the women's 4 × 100 m relay team, and set a new national record time of 43.42 seconds, at the 2026 Pan American Championships in Athletics. In July 2026, she won the bronze medal in the 100 metres at the 2026 NACAC U23 Championships behind Lavanya Williams and Alana Reid of Jamaica.
