= Athletics at the 2023 Pan American Games – Women's 100 metres =

Women's 100 metres at the 2023 Pan American Games
- Venue: Julio Martínez National Stadium
- Dates: October 30 – October 31
- Competitors: 22 from 14 nations
- Winning time: 11.36

Medalists
Gold medal	Yunisleidy García	Cuba
Silver medal	Jasmine Abrams	Guyana
Bronze medal	Michelle-Lee Ahye	Trinidad and Tobago

The women's 100 metres competition of the athletics events at the 2023 Pan American Games was held on October 30 and 31 at the Julio Martínez National Stadium of Santiago, Chile.

== Records ==
Prior to this competition, the existing world and Pan American Games records were as follows:

World record	Florence Griffith (USA)	10.49	Indianapolis, United States	July 16, 1988
Pan American Games record	Barbara Pierre (USA)	10.92	Toronto, Canada	July 21, 2015

== Schedule ==
Date	Time	Round
October 30, 2023	19:05	Semifinal
October 31, 2023	20:55	Final

== Results ==
All times shown are in seconds.

KEY:	q	Fastest non-qualifiers	Q	Qualified	NR	National record	PB	Personal best	SB	Seasonal best	DQ	Disqualified

=== Semifinal ===
Qualification: First 2 in each heat (Q) and next 2 fastest (q) qualified for the final. The results were as follows:

Wind:
Heat 1: -0.2 m/s, Heat 2: -0.4 m/s, Heat 3: -0.5 m/s

Rank	Heat	Name	Nationality	Time	Notes
1	3	Yunisleidy García	Cuba	11.53	Q
2	2	Jasmine Abrams	Guyana	11.60	Q
3	2	Ana Azevedo	Brazil	11.64	Q
4	3	Michelle-Lee Ahye	Trinidad and Tobago	11.64	Q
5	2	Yarima García	Cuba	11.65	q
6	1	Cecilia Tamayo	Mexico	11.66	Q
7	1	Liranyi Alonso	Dominican Republic	11.69	Q
8	1	Reyare Mary Thomas	Trinidad and Tobago	11.69	q
9	2	Anahí Suárez	Ecuador	11.70	
10	3	Laura Martínez	Colombia	11.70	
11	1	Aimara Nazareno	Ecuador	11.73	
12	1	Kennedy Blackmon	United States	11.74	
13	3	Halle Hazzard	Grenada	11.77	
14	1	Keliza Smith	Guyana	11.78	
15	2	María Florencia Lamboglia	Argentina	11.80	
16	2	Kortnei Johnson	United States	11.83	
17	3	María Montt	Chile	11.84	
18	1	Mickaell Moodie	Jamaica	11.86	
19	3	Maria Victoria Woodward	Argentina	12.15	
20	2	Anaís Hernández	Chile	12.16	
21	3	Guadalupe Torrez	Bolivia	12.17	
	1	Gabriela Mourão	Brazil	DNS	

=== Final ===
The results were as follows:

Wind: -0.2 m/s

Rank	Lane	Name	Nationality	Time	Notes
1st place, gold medalist(s)	6	Yunisleidy García	Cuba	11.36	
2nd place, silver medalist(s)	5	Jasmine Abrams	Guyana	11.52	
3rd place, bronze medalist(s)	1	Michelle-Lee Ahye	Trinidad and Tobago	11.53	
4	3	Ana Azevedo	Brazil	11.58	
5	2	Liranyi Alonso	Dominican Republic	11.63	
6	7	Reyare Mary Thomas	Trinidad and Tobago	11.69	
7	8	Yarima García	Cuba	11.71	
8	4	Cecilia Tamayo	Mexico	11.75	
