= 2026 Pan American Championships in Athletics =

1st Pan American Championships in Athletics
- Dates: 26–28 June 2026
- Host city: Medellín, Colombia
- Venue: Estadio Alfonso Galvis Duque
- Level: Senior
- Type: Outdoor
- Events: 45
- Participation: 350 athletes from 29 nations

2026 Pan American Championships in Athletics were the inaugural edition of the competition organised by Association of Panamerican Athletics. It took place at the Estadio Alfonso Galvis Duque in Medellín, Colombia between 26 and 28 June 2026. The winner of each event qualified for the 2027 Pan American Games.

== Medal summary ==
=== Men ===
Event	Gold		Silver		Bronze	
100 metres (wind: +1.5 m/s)	Ronal Longa; Colombia	9.85 AR, AU23R	Eliezer Adjibi; Canada	9.92 PB	Eloy Benitez; Puerto Rico	9.98
200 metres (wind: +0.4 m/s)	José Figueroa; Puerto Rico	19.87 NR	Alexis Nieves; Venezuela	20.34 NR	Adrian Canales; Puerto Rico	20.39
400 metres	Gabriel Moronta; Dominican Republic	44.67 PB	Javier Gómez; Venezuela	44.96	Jhonatan Hoyos; Colombia	45.38
800 metres	Eduardo Moreira; Brazil	1:45.07	Abdullahi Hassan; Canada	1:45.17	Ryan Ignaiker López; Venezuela	1:45.90
1500 metres	Foster Malleck; Canada	3:40.20	Gerson Montes de Oca; Ecuador	3:44.55	Camden Gilmore; Paraguay	3:46.23
5000 metres	Matías Reynaga; Argentina	14:30.53	Carlos San Martín; Colombia	14:46.00	Iker Sánchez; Mexico	14:49.25
10,000 metres	Luis Masabanda; Ecuador	29:45.06	Michael Terán; Mexico	30:46.87	Matías Reynagas; Argentina	31:14.04
110 metres hurdles (wind: -2.5 m/s)	Marcos Herrera; Ecuador	13.40	Rafael Pereira; Brazil	13.42	John Paredes; Colombia	13.44
400 metres hurdles	Yeral Núñez; Dominican Republic	48.20 PB	Gerald Drummond; Costa Rica	48.76	Francisco Viana; Brazil	48.96
3000 metres steeplechase	César Gómez; Mexico	8:56.77	Didier Rodríguez; Panama	8:59.38	Frank Durán; Colombia	9:02.88
4 × 100 metres relay	Dominican Republic; Franquelo Pérez; Yohandris Andújar; Melbin Marcelino; Yancarlos Martínez	38.34 NR	Puerto Rico; Miles Lewis; José Figueroa; Adrián Canales; Pedro Rivas	38.40 NR	Colombia; Carlos Flórez; John Paredes; Óscar Baltán; Carlos Palacios	38.85
4 × 400 metres relay	Dominican Republic; Lidio Andrés Feliz; Yeral Núñez; Christopher Melenciano; Gabriel Moronta	3:01.20	Venezuela; Carlos Zambrano; Kelvis Padrino; Axel Gómez; Javier Gómez	3:01.38	Puerto Rico; José Figueroa; Yariel Pérez; Alejandro Rosado; Jarell Cruz	3:02.22 NR
Half marathon walk	Iván Oña; Ecuador	1:27:03	Ricardo Ortíz; Mexico	1:27:21	Éider Arévalo; Colombia	1:28:24
High jump	Jair Portillo; Mexico	2.15	Juan Ignacio Acosta; Puerto Rico	2.12	Gilmar Correa; Colombia	2.12
Pole vault	Austin Miller; United States	5.81	Ricardo Montes de Oca; Venezuela	5.50	Guillermo Correa; Chile	5.30
Long jump	Emiliano Lasa; Uruguay	7.99	Arnovis Dalmero; Colombia	7.97	William Williams; United States	7.90
Triple jump	Almir dos Santos; Brazil	17.24	Elton Petronilho; Brazil	16.56	Brandon Green; United States	16.47
Shot put	Willian Dourado; Brazil	20.53	Juan Carley Vázquez; Cuba	19.63	Ronald Grueso; Colombia	19.22 PB
Discus throw	Claudio Romero; Chile	65.30	Joseph Brown; United States	64.04	Juan José Caicedo; Ecuador	62.33
Hammer throw	Humberto Mansilla; Chile	75.38	Daniel Haugh; United States	74.56	Gabriel Kehr; Chile	74.28
Javelin throw	Lars Flaming; Paraguay	82.10 PB	Marc Minichello; United States	81.36	Pedro Henrique Rodrigues; Brazil	78.96

=== Women ===
Event	Gold		Silver		Bronze	
100 metres (wind: +0.4 m/s)	Sade McCreath; Canada	11.10	Ana Carolina Azevedo; Brazil	11.16	Liranyi Alonso; Dominican Republic	11.18
200 metres (wind: -1.3 m/s)	Audrey Leduc; Canada	22.64	Nicole Caicedo; Ecuador	23.06	Ana Carolina Azevedo; Brazil	23.10
400 metres	Lauren Gale; Canada	50.68	Gabby Scott; Puerto Rico	50.69	Lina Licona; Colombia	50.75 PB
800 metres	Daily Cooper Gaspar; Cuba	1:56.10 PB	Meghan Hunter; United States	1:58.93	Maeliss Trapeau; Canada	1:59.54
1500 metres	Daily Cooper Gaspar; Cuba	4:22.72	Micaela Levaggi; Argentina	4:24.14	Carmen Alder; Ecuador	4:25.28
5000 metres	Anisleidis Ochoa; Cuba	16:37.48	Veronica Huacasi; Peru	16:39.00	Benita Parra; Bolivia	16:40.79
10,000 metres	Viviana Aroche; Guatemala	34:41.95	Mary Granja; Ecuador	34:42.90	Nélida Peñaflor; Argentina	34:45.14
100 metres hurdles (wind: +1.0 m/s)	Vitória Alves; Brazil	12.59	Tatiana Aholou; Canada	12.69	Micaela de Mello; Brazil	12.90
400 metres hurdles	Michelle Smith; U.S. Virgin Islands	54.93	Grace Claxton; Puerto Rico	55.14	Bianca Stubler; United States	55.34
3000 m steeplechase	Micaela Levaggi; Argentina	9:46.90	Veronica Huacasi; Peru	10:01.57	Sabrina Salcedo; Mexico	10:16.69
4 × 100 metres relay	Dominican Republic; Patricia Sine; Fiordaliza Cofil; Estrella de Aza; Liranyi Alonso	43.29	Puerto Rico; Adanelys Rodríguez; Gladymar Torres; Legna Echevarría; Frances Colón	43.42 NR	Chile; Macarena Borie; María Montt; Anaís Hernández; Belén Ituarte	44.05
4 × 400 metres relay	Colombia; Paola Loboa; Melany Bolaño; María Alejandra Rocha; Lina Licona	3:29.49 NR	Dominican Republic; Evelin del Carmen; Milagros Durán; Franshina Martínez; Estrella de Aza	3:31.40	Only two competing teams	
Half marathon walk	Evelyn Inga; Peru	1:35:34	Glenda Morejón; Ecuador	1:35:44 PB	Alejandra Ortega; Mexico	1:38:09
High jump	Marysabel Senyu; Dominican Republic	1.92	María Arboleda; Colombia	1.84	Hellen Tenorio; Colombia	1.81 SB
Pole vault	Juliana Campos; Brazil	4.45	Alyssa Quiñones; Puerto Rico	4.20	Jennifer Elizarov; Canada	4.20
Long jump	Alysbeth Félix; Puerto Rico	6.64	Nathalee Aranda; Panama	6.57	Paola Fernández; Puerto Rico	6.49
Triple jump	Gabriele dos Santos; Brazil	14.18	Regiclecia da Silva; Brazil	13.79	Mylana Hearn; United States	13.75
Shot put	Dianelis Delís; Cuba	18.12	Ivana Gallardo; Chile	17.58	Rosa Ramírez; Dominican Republic	17.45
Discus throw	Andressa de Morais; Brazil	58.87	Yerlin Mesa; Colombia	55.92 SB	Isabella Mosquera; Colombia	52.91
Hammer throw	Jillian Weir; Canada	70.37	Jinaye Shomachuk; Canada	70.13	Ximena Zorrilla; Peru	69.39 SB
Javelin throw	Valentina Barrios; Colombia	60.72 SB	Luz Castro; Mexico	52.17	Ariana Ince; United States	51.69
Heptathlon	María Fernanda Murillo; Colombia	6357 PB	Sienna MacDonald; Canada	5974 SB	Madisson Lawrence; Canada	5897

=== Mixed ===
Event	Gold		Silver		Bronze	
4 × 100 metres relay	Dominican Republic; Yohandris Andújar; Fiordaliza Cofil; Melbin Marcelino; Liranyi Alonso	40.92 NR	Brazil; Erik Cardoso; Gabriela Mourão; Felipe Bardi; Ana Carolina Azevedo	41.55	Colombia; Carlos Flórez; Angélica Gamboa; Óscar Baltán; Danna Banquez	41.63 NR
4 × 400 metres relay	Dominican Republic; Erick Sánchez; Anabel Medina; Christopher Melenciano; Estrella de Aza	3:13.83 SB	Colombia; Daniel Balanta; Melany Bolaño; Jhonatan Hoyos; Lina Licona	3:15.36 SB	Puerto Rico; Yariel Pérez; Adanelys Rodríguez; Jarell Cruz; Andrea Rivera	3:16.07 NR

=== Medal table ===
* Host nation (Colombia)

Rank	Nation	Gold	Silver	Bronze	Total
1	Dominican Republic	8	2	2	12
2	Brazil	7	5	4	16
3	Canada	5	5	3	13
4	Colombia*	4	5	11	20
5	Cuba	4	1	0	5
6	Ecuador	3	4	2	9
7	Puerto Rico	2	5	5	12
8	Mexico	2	3	3	8
9	Chile	2	1	3	6
10	Argentina	2	1	2	5
11	United States	1	4	5	10
12	Peru	1	2	1	4
13	Paraguay	1	0	1	2
14	Guatemala	1	0	0	1
14	U.S. Virgin Islands	1	0	0	1
14	Uruguay	1	0	0	1
17	Venezuela	0	4	1	5
18	Panama	0	2	0	2
19	Costa Rica	0	1	0	1
20	Bolivia	0	0	1	1
Totals (20 entries)		45	45	44	134

=== Points table ===
Rank	Nation	Total
1	Colombia	269
2	Dominican Republic	207
3	Brazil	181
4	Puerto Rico	157
5	Mexico	151
6	Canada	145
7	Venezuela	102
8	Ecuador	89
9	United States	89
10	Argentina	76
11	Chile	70
12	Cuba	52
13	Peru	39
14	Costa Rica	29
15	United States Virgin Islands	22
16	Panama	18
17	Paraguay	16
18	Guatemala	15
19	Uruguay	14
20	Bolivia	14
21	British Virgin Islands	10
22	Honduras	9
23	Dominica	5
24	El Salvador	5
25	Suriname	5
26	Antigua and Barbuda	3

== Participating nations ==
- Antigua and Barbuda (4)
- Argentina (14)
- Belize (1)
- Bolivia (2)
- Brazil (29)
- British Virgin Islands (4)
- Canada (25)
- Chile (17)
- Colombia (46)
- Costa Rica (8)
- Cuba (6)
- Dominica (1)
- Dominican Republic (31)
- Ecuador (13)
- Guatemala (4)
- Haiti (1)
- Honduras (8)
- Mexico (35)
- Nicaragua (2)
- Panama (8)
- Paraguay (2)
- Peru (6)
- Puerto Rico (26)
- El Salvador (2)
- Suriname (2)
- United States (17)
- United States Virgin Islands (10)
- Uruguay (6)
- Venezuela (20)
