= Jennifer Elizarov =

Canadian pole vault athlete

Personal information
- Born: September 25, 2003 (age 22)

Sport
- Sport: Track and Field
- Event: Pole Vault
- University team: University of Guelph
- Club: Royal City Athletics Club
Medal record
Women's athletics
Representing Canada
Pan American Championships
Bronze medal – third place	2026 Medellín	Pole vault
Junior Pan American Games
Gold medal – first place	2025 Asunción	Pole vault

Jennifer Elizarov (born September 25, 2003) is a Canadian track and field athlete who specializes in the pole vault. She is the 2025 Canadian National Champion, and also won gold at the 2025 Junior Pan American Games in Paraguay. She was selected to represent Canada at the 2025 World Athletics Championships in Tokyo.

Elizarov is a member of the Gryphons Track and Field team at the University of Guelph.
