= Maeliss Trapeau =

Canadian athlete

Personal information
- Nationality: Canadian
- Born: 28 September 1999 (age 26)

Sport
- Sport: Athletics
- Event: Middle-distance running

Achievements and titles
- Personal bests: 800m: 1:58.90 (Tokyo, 2025); Indoor; 800m: 2:01.68 (Madrid, 2026)
Medal record
Women's athletics
Representing Canada
Pan American Championships
Bronze medal – third place	2026 Medellín	800 m

Maeliss Trapeau (born 28 September 1999) is a Canadian middle-distance runner. She won the Canadian Athletics Championships in 2025 over 800 metres. She previously represented France at the 2018 World Athletics U20 Championships.

== Early life ==
Born in France, arrived in Canada in 2005,Trapeau placed eighth for Lycée Claudel at the 2017 OFSAA high school provincial championships. She attended the University of Ottawa where she studied biotechnology. She won a 2019 U Sports 4 × 800 m relay bronze medal with the Ottawa Gee-Gees and an Ontario University Athletics individual bronze medal in 2020.

== Career ==
She represented France at the 2018 World Athletics U20 Championships in Finland. She became the French under-23 national champion in 2021, and placed sixth at the 2024 French Athletics Championships. In May 2025, she ran a personal best 1:59.09 whilst competing in Toulouse. She later transferred her international allegiance back to Canada, the country of her birth.

After switching to Canada she represented the Ottawa Lions and won the 800 metres final at the Canadian Athletics Championships, finishing ahead of Jazz Shukla in 2:01.79. In August 2025, she officially became the eleventh Canadian woman to break the two-minute barrier for the 800 metres, running 1:59.86 in Switzerland.

In September 2025, she was a semi-finalist in the women's 800 metres at the 2025 World Athletics Championships in Tokyo, Japan, where she ran a personal best of 1:58.90 without advancing to the final.

Trapeau represented Canada at the 2026 World Athletics Indoor Championships in Toruń, Poland, without advancing to the semi-finals of the 800 metres.

Trapeau won the bronze medal in the 800 metres at the 2026 Pan American Championships in Athletics in Medellín, running 1:59.54. She was a semi-finalist in the 800 metres at the 2026 Commonwealth Games in Glasgow, Scotland.
