= Jinaye Shomachuk =

Canadian hammer thrower (born 2003)

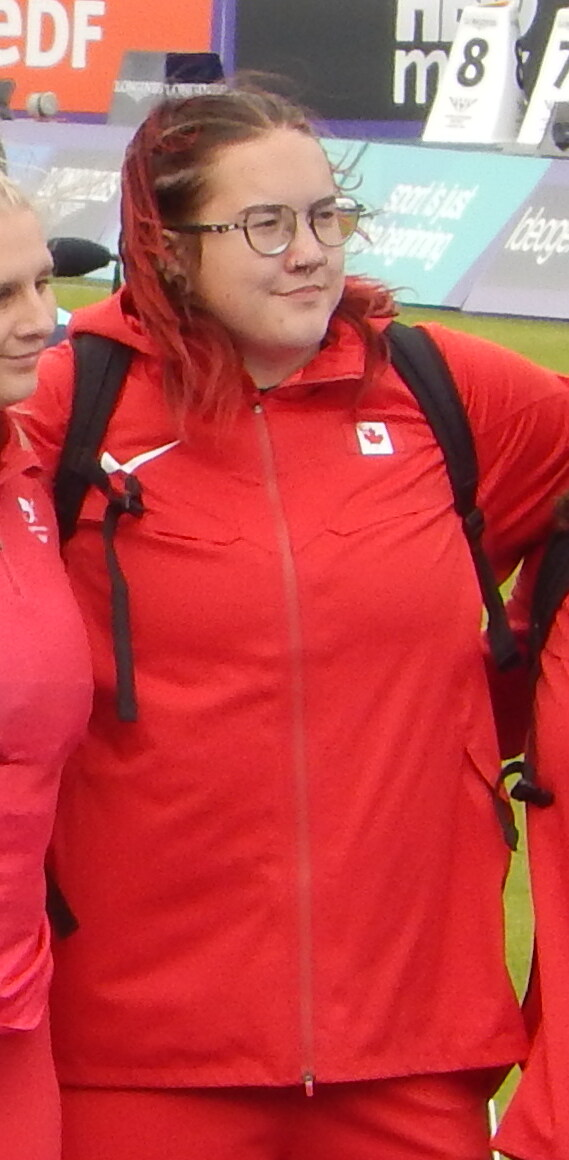

Personal information
- Born: 24 November 2003 (age 22)

Sport
- Sport: Athletics
- Event: Hammer throw

Achievements and titles
- Personal best: Hammer: 71.25 m (2026)
Medal record
Women's athletics
Representing Canada
Pan American Championships
Silver medal – second place	2026 Medellín	Hammer throw

Jinaye Shomachuk (born 24 November 2003) is a Canadian hammer thrower. She was the silver medallist at the 2026 Pan American Championships.

== Biography ==
Shomachuk attended Bert Church High School in Airdrie, Alberta and showed aptitude for the hammer throw from a young age. As a 14 year-old athlete for the athletics club the Airdrie Aces, Shomachuk threw the 3kg hammer 49.07 metres on 14 July 2018, in Calgary to rank number one in her age-group in the country.

At the 2025 Canada Summer Games, Shomachuk won two medals, with gold in the hammer with a throw of 58.8 metres and silver in discus throw, with 46.81 metres.

Competing for University of Lethbridge, Shomachuk went undefeated in shot put and weight throw events throughout the 2025-2026 winter, and broke the U SPORTS weight throw record four times, including 21.67 metres at the Jim Daly Bison Classic. She was named the Canada West Field Athlete of the Year and U SPORTS Women’s Field Athlete of the Year in 2026.

In June 2026, Shomachuk placed third behind Camryn Rogers and Jillian Weir in the hammer throw at the Canadian Athletics Championships, with a throw of 69.27 metres. Later that month, she won the silver medal for Canada, behind Weir, at the 2026 Pan American Championships in Medellín, Colombia. She placed sixth in the hammer throw at the 2026 Commonwealth Games in Glasgow, Scotland.
