= María Montt =

Chilean sprinter (born 1997)

Personal information
- Full name: María Ignacia Montt
- Born: 23 February 1996 (age 30)

Sport
- Sport: Athletics
- Event: Sprint

Achievements and titles
- Personal bests: 60m: 7.32 (Cochabamba, 2025); 100m: 11.33 (Mar del Plata, 2025); 200m: 23.17 (Bogota, 2024)
Medal record
Women's athletics
Representing Chile
Pan American Games
Silver medal – second place	2023 Santiago	4×100 m relay
South American Games
Silver medal – second place	2022 Asunción	4×100 m relay
Silver medal – second place	2026 Santa Fe	4×100 m relay
Pan American Championships
Bronze medal – third place	2026 Medellín	4×100 m relay
South American Championships
Bronze medal – third place	2025 Mar del Plata	100 m
Ibero-American Championships
Bronze medal – third place	2024 Cuiabá	4×100 m relay

María Ignacia Montt (born 23 February 1996) is a Chilean sprinter. A national champion over 100 metres and 200 metres, she has represented Chile at multiple international events and was a bronze medalist in the 100 metres at the 2025 South American Championships.

== Biography ==
Montt equalled her personal best of 11.77 seconds for the 100 metres as she placed fifth overall at the 2021 South American Championships in Athletics in Guayaquil.

Montt was a silver medalist in the 4 x 100 metres at the 2023 Pan American Games, as the Chilean team of her, Anaís Hernández, Martina Weil and Isidora Jiménez set a new national record in both the semi-final and the final.

Montt was a bronze medalist in the 4 x 100 metres at the 2024 Ibero-American Championships in Athletics in Brazil. She ran as part of the 4 × 100 m relay team at the 2024 World Relays Championships in Nassau, Bahamas.

In April 2025, she won the bronze medal in the 100 metres at the 2025 South American Championships in Athletics in Mar del Plata in Argentina, running a personal best 11.33 seconds.

Montt competed for Chile at the 2025 World Athletics Relays in Guangzhou, China, helping the national team qualify for the upcoming World Championships in the 4 x 100 metres relay. She subsequently competed in the women's 4 x 100 metres at the 2025 World Championships in Tokyo, Japan, as part of the Chilean team which placed fifth in their heat. She also competed in the individual 100 metres at the Championships, without advancing from her heat with a time of 11.68 seconds.

In May 2026, she ran at the 2026 World Athletics Relays in the women's 4 × 100 metres relay in Gaborone, Botswana.

== Personal life ==
Montt was diagnosed with type one diabetes as a child.

Montt got a bachelor's degree in business administration at the Pontifical Catholic University of Chile in March 2026.
