= 2024 USA Indoor Track and Field Championships =

2024 USA Track & Field Indoor Championships
- Dates: January 27–28; February 16–17
- Host city: Indianapolis, Indiana; Albuquerque, New Mexico, United States
- Venue: Indiana State Fairgrounds; Albuquerque Convention Center
- Level: Senior
- Type: Indoor
- Events: 28 (men: 14; women: 14)
- Participation: 212 Men + 212 Women; 424 athletes

The 2024 USA Indoor Track and Field Championships were held at the Indiana State Fairgrounds from January 27-28, and the Albuquerque Convention Center in Albuquerque, New Mexico from February 16–17. Organized by USA Track and Field (USATF), it served as the indoor United States national championships in track and field and selection meet for the 2024 World Athletics Indoor Championships in Glasgow, Scotland.

== Medal summary ==
=== Men's track ===
Event	Gold		Silver		Bronze	
60 metres	Noah Lyles	6.43	Christian Coleman	6.44	Ronnie Baker	6.51
60 metres hurdles (Note: Grant Holloway set a world record of 7.27 seconds in the preliminary rounds.)	Trey Cunningham	7.39	Cameron Murray	7.45	Daniel Roberts	7.48
400 metres	Brian Faust	45.57	Jacory Patterson	45.48	Chris Bailey	45.76
800 metres	Bryce Hoppel	1:46.67	Isaiah Harris	1:46.78	Josh Hoey	1:47.41
1500 metres	Cole Hocker	3:37.51	Hobbs Kessler	3:38.76	Henry Wynne	3:38.81
3000 metres	Yared Nuguse	7:55.76	Olin Hacker	7:56.22	Morgan Beadlescomb	7:56.70
3000 metres race walk	Nick Christie	11:56.06	Emmanuel Corvera	12:47.14	Clayton Stoil	13:14.58

=== Men's field ===
Event	Gold		Silver		Bronze	
High jump	Shelby McEwen	2.28 m (7 ft 5 3/4 in)	Vernon Turner	2.25 m (7 ft 4 1/2 in)	Kyle Robbins	2.25 m (7 ft 4 1/2 in)
Pole vault	Chris Nilsen	6.00 m (19 ft 8 in)	Sam Kendricks	5.95 m (19 ft 6 1/4 in)	Austin Miller	5.90 m (19 ft 4 1/4 in)
Long jump	Johnny Brackins	8.23 m (27 ft 0 in)	Isaac Grimes	8.06 m (26 ft 5 1/4 in)	Jarrion Lawson	8.05 m (26 ft 4 3/4 in)
Triple jump	Chris Carter	16.49 m (54 ft 1 in)	Chris Bernard	16.42 m (53 ft 10 1/4 in)	James Carter	16.16 m (53 ft 0 in)
Shot put	Ryan Crouser	22.80 m (74 ft 9 1/2 in)	Roger Steen	21.47 m (70 ft 5 1/4 in)	Jordan Geist	20.50 m (67 ft 3 in)
Weight throw	Daniel Haugh	26.35 m (86 ft 5 1/4 in) WR	Isaiah Rogers	24.41 m (80 ft 1 in)	Tanner Berg	23.41 m (76 ft 9 1/2 in)
Heptathlon	Steve Bastien	5886 points	Jack Flood	5665 points	Jakob Tordsen	5494 points

=== Women's track ===
Event	Gold		Silver		Bronze	
60 metres	Aleia Hobbs	7.02	Mikiah Brisco	7.06	Celera Barnes	7.09
60 metres hurdles	Tia Jones	7.68	Jasmine Jones	7.78	Masai Russell	7.80
400 metres	Alexis Holmes	50.34	Talitha Diggs	51.23	Quanera Hayes	51.76
800 metres	Allie Wilson	2:00.63	Addison Wiley	2:00.70	Nia Akins	2:00.90
1500 metres	Nikki Hiltz	4:08.35	Emily Mackay	4:08.70	Anna Camp-Bennett	4:10.20
3000 metres	Elle St. Pierre	8:54.40	Josette Andrews	9:03.10	Katie Wasserman	9:06.99
3000 metres race walk	Miranda Melville	13:55.24	Janelle Branch	13:59.81	Robyn Stevens	14:07.30

=== Women's field ===
Event	Gold		Silver		Bronze	
High jump	Vashti Cunningham	1.92 m (6 ft 3 1/2 in)	JaiCieonna Gero-Holt	1.89 m (6 ft 2 1/4 in)	Cierra Tidwell-Allphin	1.85 m (6 ft 3/4 in)
Pole vault	Katie Moon	4.80 m (15 ft 8 3/4 in)	Sandi Morris	4.75 m (15 ft 7 in)	Gabriela Leon	4.70 m (15 ft 5 in)
Long jump	Tara Davis-Woodhall	7.18 m (23 ft 6 1/2 in)	Jasmine Moore	6.93 m (22 ft 8 3/4 in)	Monae' Nichols	6.73 m (22 ft 3/4 in)
Triple jump	Keturah Orji	14.50 m (47 ft 6 3/4 in)	Jasmine Moore	14.43 m (47 ft 4 in)	Mylana Hearn	13.81 m (45 ft 3 1/2 in)
Shot put	Chase Jackson	20.02 m (65 ft 8 in)	Maggie Ewen	19.14 m (62 ft 9 1/2 in)	Adelaide Aquilla	18.74 m (61 ft 5 3/4 in)
Weight throw	Erin Reese	25.73 m (84 ft 4 3/4 in)	Brooke Andersen	24.35 m (79 ft 10 1/2 in)	Janeah Stewart	24.29 m (79 ft 8 1/4 in)
Pentathlon	Cheyenne Nesbitt	4475 points	Annie Kunz	4418 points	Hope Bender	4392 points

== Qualification ==
The 2024 USA Indoor Track and Field Championships serve national championship meet and selection meet for 2024 World Athletics Indoor Championships March 1-3 in Glasgow, Scotland for Team USA.

=== Defending World Champions ===
- Grant Holloway - 60 m hurdles
- Ajeé Wilson - 800 m
- Sandi Morris - pole vault

=== Defending World Tour Winner ===
- Aleia Hobbs - 60 m
- Grant Holloway - 60 m hurdles

== Schedule ==
H	Heats	½	Semi-finals	F	Final
M = morning session, A = afternoon session

Men
Date →	17 February	18 February	
Event ↓	A	A	
60 metres		½	F
400 metres	H	F	
800 metres	H	F	
1500 metres		F	
3000 metres	F		
60 metres hurdles		½	F
High jump	F		
Pole vault	F		
Long jump		F	
Triple jump		F	
Shot put		F	
35 lbs Weight throw		F	

Women
Date →	17 February	18 February	
Event ↓	A	A	
60 metres		½	F
400 metres	H	F	
800 metres	H	F	
1500 metres	F		
3000 metres		F	
60 metres hurdles		½	F
High jump		F	
Pole vault		F	
Long jump	F		
Triple jump		F	
Shot put	F		
20 lbs Weight throw		F	

Event schedule
DAY ONE - SATURDAY, JANUARY 27TH
Indoor heptathlon
10:00 AM	M	Heptathlon (60m)	Final
10:40 AM	M	Heptathlon (Long Jump)	Final
11:20 PM	M	Heptathlon (Shot Put)	Final
12:00 PM	M	Heptathlon (High Jump)	Final
DAY TWO—SUNDAY, JANUARY 28TH
10:30 AM	M	Heptathlon (60m Hurdles)	Final
11:45 AM	M	Heptathlon (Pole Vault)	Final
2:30 PM	M	Heptathlon (1000m)	Final
Indoor pentathlon
10:00 AM	W	Pentathlon (60m Hurdles)	Final
11:15 AM	W	Pentathlon (High Jump)	Final
12:45 PM	W	Pentathlon (Shot Put)	Final
2:00 PM	W	Pentathlon (Long Jump)	Final
3:00 PM	W	Pentathlon (800m)	Final

Event schedule
DAY ONE—FRIDAY, February 16TH NBC Sports 5:30 - 8:30 PM MT
Track Events
Time (MST)	Men / Women	Event	Division Round
4:00 PM	M	3000m Race Walk	Final
4:22 PM	W	3000m Race Walk	Final
4:48 PM	W	800m	First Round
5:18 PM	M	800m	First Round
5:48 PM	W	3000m	Final
6:04 PM	W	60m Hurdles	Semi Finals
6:27 PM	M	60m Hurdles	Semi Finals
6:50 PM	W	400m	First Round
7:27 PM	M	400m	First Round
8:04 PM	M	3000m	Final
8:19 PM	W	60m Hurdles	Final
8:28 PM	M	60m Hurdles	Final
Field Events
3:00 PM	W	High Jump	Final
3:00 PM	M	High Jump	Final
4:30 PM	M	35LB Weight Throw	Final
5:00 PM	M	Triple Jump	Final
5:30 PM	M	Pole Vault	Final
6:30 PM	W	Shot Put	Final
7:00 PM	W	Long Jump	Final
DAY TWO—SATURDAY, February 17TH NBC Sports 2:00 - 4:00 PM MT
Track Events
2:03 PM	W	60m	Semi Finals
2:26 PM	M	60m	Semi Finals
2:49 PM	W	400m	Final
2:58 PM	W	800m	Final
3:07 PM	M	800m	Final
3:16 PM	M	400m	Final
3:25 PM	W	1500m	Final
3:36 PM	M	1500m	Final
3:47 PM	W	60m	Final
3:56 PM	M	60m	Final
Field Events
1:00 PM	W	20LB Weight Throw	Final
1:30 PM	W	Pole Vault	Final
2:15 PM	W	Triple Jump	Final
2:35 PM	M	Long Jump	Final
2:45 PM	M	Shot Put	Final

== Entry Standards ==
Events in bold will be contested at the Championships.

Men	Women
60 meters 24-2
6.70	7.35
10.20 (100m)	11.30 (100m)
60 m hurdles 24-2
7.90	8.35
13.80 (110m hurdles)	13.25 (100m hurdles)
400 meters 20-2
47.50 (Indoor)	54.00 (Indoor)
46.50 (Outdoor)	52.50 (Outdoor)
51.00 (400m hurdles)	57.10 (400m hurdles)
800 meters 24-2
1:48.75 (indoor)	2:05.00 (indoor)
1:47.50 (outdoor)	2:03.00 (outdoor)
1500 meters 12-1
3:39.00 (1500 m)	4:09.00 (1500 m)
3:55.00 (Mile)	4:30.00 (Mile)
3000 meters 16-1
7:50.00 (3000 m)	9:05.00 (3000 m)
13:20.00 (5000 m)	15:30.00 (5000 m)
High Jump 12-1
2.14 m (7 ft 1/4 in)	1.78 m (5 ft 10 in)
Pole Vault 12-1
5.85 m (19 ft 2 1/4 in)	4.35 m (14 ft 3 1/4 in)
Long Jump 12-1
7.65 m (25 ft 1 in)	6.15 m (20 ft 2 in)
Triple Jump 12-1
15.50 m (50 ft 10 in)	12.80 m (41 ft 11 3/4 in)
Shot Put 12-1
18.90 m (62 ft 0 in)	16.00 m (52 ft 5 3/4 in)
Weight Throw 12-1
21.00 m (68 ft 10 3/4 in)	21.00 m (68 ft 10 3/4 in)
Heptathlon / Pentathlon 12-1
5450 pts	3900 pts
Decathlon 7300 pts	Heptathlon 5300 pts

January 1, 2023 – February 11, 2024 window.
