= Marc Minichello =

American javelin thrower (born 2000)

Personal information
- Born: Marc Anthony Minichello; 6 April 2000 (age 26)

Sport
- Sport: Athletics
- Event: Javelin throw

Achievements and titles
- Personal best: Javelin: 84.11 m (2026)
Medal record
Men's athletics
Representing United States
Pan American Championships
Silver medal – second place	2026 Medellín	Javelin throw

Marc Anthony Minichello (born 6 April 2000) is an American javelin thrower. He was a two-time winner of the NCAA Outdoor Championships.

== Biography ==
Minichello is from Exeter, Pennsylvania. The 2018 Wyoming Area High graduate finished fourth in the javelin throw at the US Olympic Trials in 2021 in Eugene, Oregon.

In 2022, competing for the University of Pennsylvania, he won the javelin throw at the 2022 NCAA Division I Outdoor Track and Field Championships with a throw of 81.17 metres. He finished in third place in both 2022 and 2023 at the senior USA Track and Field Championships.

In 2024, competing for the University of Georgia, he won the 2024 NCAA Division I Outdoor Track and Field Championships for the second time, with a throw of 80.70 metres.

Minichello threw the three best marks of his career in April and May 2025 with his performances including a personal best 82.65 metres at the USATF Throws Festival in Tucson, Arizona on 24 May, to go into the 2025 USA Track and Field Championships ranked second in the country. He threw 76.81 metres to place third overall in the javelin throw at the 2025 USA Outdoor Track and Field Championships in Eugene, Oregon. He was selected for the 2025 World Athletics Championships in Tokyo, Japan, throwing 80.47 metres without advancing to the final.

On 28 March 2026, he won the javelin throw at the USATF Winter Long Throws National Championship in Arizona with a throw of 75.32 metres. The following month, he set a new personal best 84.11 metres at the Drake Relays to move to seventh on the American all-time list. On 25 July, he placed third at the 2026 USA Outdoor Track and Field Championships in New York. Competing in the Diamond League at the 2026 Athletissima in Lausanne, Switzerland on 21 August 2026, he placed fifth with 80.06 metres.
