= Francisco Guilherme dos Reis Viana =

Brazilian athlete (born 1999)

Personal information
- Born: 14 December 1999 (age 26)

Sport
- Sport: Athletics
- Event: 400 metres hurdles

Achievements and titles
- Personal bests: 400mH : 48.69 (Tokyo, 2025)
Medal record
Representing Brazil
Men's athletics
Pan American Championships
Bronze medal – third place	2026 Medellín	400 m hurdles
South American Games
Silver medal – second place	2026 Santa Fe	400 m hurdles
South American Championships
Gold medal – first place	2025 Mar del Plata	400 m hurdles
South American U23 Championships
Gold medal – first place	2021 Guayaquil	400 m hurdles

Francisco Guilherme dos Reis Viana (born 14 December 1999) is a Brazilian hurdler. He became South American champion in 2025 in the 400 metres hurdles.

== Biography ==
He is a member of Orcampi athletics club in São Paulo, Brazil. He won the gold medal in the 400 metres at the 2021 South American Under-23 Championships in Athletics in Guayaquil, Ecuador.

In June 2024, he won the Brazilian Athletics Championships title over 400 metres hurdles in a time of 50.13 seconds. he won the 400m hurdles at the Brazilian Athletics Championships in 50.47 seconds in São Paulo.

He won the gold medal in the 400 metres hurdles at the 2025 South American Championships in Athletics in Mar del Plata, Argentina in April 2025. That summer, he won the 400m hurdles at the Brazilian Athletics Championships in 49.13 seconds.

He was a semi-finalist in the 400 metres hurdles at the 2025 World Athletics Championships in Tokyo, Japan, running a personal best 48.69 seconds in the preliminary round.

In June 2026, he ran 48.96 seconds to win the bronze medal in the inaugural 400 metres hurdles final at the 2026 Pan American Championships in Athletics in Medellín.
