= Gabriel Moronta =

Dominican Republic athlete (born 2002)

Personal information
- Nationality: Dominican Republic
- Born: 19 October 2002 (age 23)

Sport
- Sport: Athletics
- Event: 400 metres

Achievements and titles
- Personal best: 400m: 44.67s (2026)
Medal record
Men's athletics
Representing Dominican Republic
Pan American Championships
Gold medal – first place	2026 Medellín	400 m
Gold medal – first place	2026 Medellín	4×400 m relay

Gabriel Moronta (born 19 October 2002) is a sprinter from the Dominican Republic. He won the gold medal at the 2026 Pan American Championships in Athletics over 400 metres.

== Biography ==
Moronta was a 2021 graduate of Pleasantville High School in Atlantic County, New Jersey. Moronta won the 800 metres title at the 2020 New Jersey Indoor Meet of Champions. He initially competed for Mississippi State University before he transferred to the University of South Florida.

Competing for South Florida, he was part of the winning 4 x 400 metres relay team at the 2025 NCAA Championships. He was also a finalist in the individual 400 metres but was disqualified for a lane infringement.

Moronta won the gold medal over 400 metres at the inaugural 2026 Pan American Championships in Medellín, running a new personal best of 44.67 seconds.
