= Athletics at the 2023 Pan American Games – Women's 4 × 100 metres relay =

Women's 4 × 100 metres relay at the 2023 Pan American Games
- Venue: Julio Martínez National Stadium
- Dates: November 2, 2023
- Competitors: 41 from 9 nations
- Winning time: 43.72

Medalists
Gold medal	Laura Moreira; Enis Pérez; Yarima García; Yunisleidy García	Cuba
Silver medal	Anaís Hernández; Martina Weil; Isidora Jiménez; María Montt	Chile
Bronze medal	Liranyi Alonso; Marileidy Paulino; Martha Méndez; Anabel Medina	Dominican Republic

The women's 4 × 100 metres relay competition of the athletics events at the 2023 Pan American Games took place on November 2, 2023 at the Julio Martínez National Stadium of Santiago, Chile.

In the finals, the U.S. team dropped the baton and had to jog to the finish in a time of 1:01.30.

== Records ==
Prior to this competition, the existing world and Pan American Games records were as follows:

World record	United States	40.82	London, United Kingdom	August 10, 2012
Pan American Games record	United States	42.58	Toronto, Canada	July 25, 2015

== Schedule ==
Date	Time	Round
November 2, 2023	17:45	Semifinal
November 2, 2023	20:53	Final

== Results ==
All times shown are in seconds.

KEY:	q	Fastest non-qualifiers	Q	Qualified	NR	National record	PB	Personal best	SB	Seasonal best	DQ	Disqualified

=== Semifinals ===
The results were as follows

Rank	Heat	Nation	Name	Time	Notes
1	2	Cuba	Laura Moreira; Enis Pérez; Yarima García; Jocelyn Echazábal	43.63	Q
2	1	Ecuador	Evelin Mercado; Nicole Caicedo; Aimara Nazareno; Nicol Chala	44.34	Q
3	2	Chile	Anaís Hernández; Martina Weil; Isidora Jiménez; María Montt	44.35	Q, SB
4	2	Colombia	Laura Martínez; Lina Licona; Shary Vallecilla; Natalia Linares	44.67	Q
5	2	Brazil	Anny de Bassi; Gabriela Mourão; Letícia Nonato; Caroline de Melo	44.71	q
6	1	Argentina	Belén Fritzsche; María Lamboglia; Melanie Rosález; María Woodward	44.72	Q, SB
7	1	United States	Taylor Anderson; Kortnei Johnson; Shannon Ray; Kennedy Blackmon	44.83	Q
8	1	Dominican Republic	Liranyi Alonso; Anabel Medina; Martha Méndez; Darianny Jiménez	45.05	q
9	1	Bolivia	Lauren Mendoza; Guadalupe Torrez; Alinny Delgadillo; Letícia Arispe	45.85	

=== Final ===
The results were as follows

Rank	Lane	Nation	Name	Time	Notes
1st place, gold medalist(s)	6	Cuba	Laura Moreira; Enis Pérez; Yarima García; Yunisleidy García	43.72	
2nd place, silver medalist(s)	7	Chile	Anaís Hernández; Martina Weil; Isidora Jiménez; María Montt	44.19	NR
3rd place, bronze medalist(s)	2	Dominican Republic	Liranyi Alonso; Marileidy Paulino; Martha Méndez; Anabel Medina	44.32	
4	4	Ecuador	Gabriela Suárez; Nicole Caicedo; Aimara Nazareno; Nicol Chala	44.64	
5	1	Brazil	Anny de Bassi; Gabriela Mourão; Ana Azevedo; Caroline de Melo	44.67	
6	8	Colombia	Laura Martínez; Lina Licona; Shary Vallecilla; Natalia Linares	44.79	
7	3	United States	Alaysha Johnson; Taylor Anderson; Shannon Ray; Kennedy Blackmon	1:01.30	
	5	Argentina	Belén Fritzsche; María Lamboglia; Melanie Rosález; María Woodward	DNS	
