= Anabel Medina (athlete) =

Dominican Republic sprinter

Personal information
- Nationality: Dominican
- Born: Anabel Medina Ventura; 15 December 1996 (age 29) Santo Domingo, Dominican Republic

Sport
- Sport: Athletics
- Event: 400 metres
Medal record
Representing the Dominican Republic
Olympic Games
| Silver medal – second place | 2020 Tokyo | Mixed relay |
Pan American Games
| Gold medal – first place | 2023 Santiago | Mixed relay |
| Silver medal – second place | 2023 Santiago | 4×400 m relay |
| Bronze medal – third place | 2023 Santiago | 4×100 m relay |
Pan American Championships
| Gold medal – first place | 2026 Medellín | Mixed relay |
Ibero-American Championships
| Gold medal – first place | 2026 Lima | 400 m |
| Gold medal – first place | 2026 Lima | 4×400 m relay |
| Silver medal – second place | 2024 Cuiabá | 400 m |

Anabel Medina Ventura (born 15 December 1996) is a Dominican Republic athlete. She won a silver medal in the mixed 4 × 400 metres relay event at the 2020 Summer Olympics. She won three medals at the 2023 Pan American Games, including a gold medal in the mixed 4 × 400 metres relay event.

== Career ==
Medina won a bronze medal with the women's 4 × 400 metres relay team at the 2014 Central American and Caribbean Junior Championships. She represented the Dominican Republic at the 2017 Summer Universiade and finished 20th in the 200 metres semifinals. At the 2018 Central American and Caribbean Games, she won a bronze medal with the 4 × 100 metres relay.

Medina competed at the World Athletics Relays in the mixed 4 × 400 metres relay. They qualified to the final round with a 3:16.67 mark and qualified for the 2020 Olympic Games and the 2022 World Championships and later won the bronze medal with 3:17.58. She then represented the Dominican Republic at the 2020 Summer Olympics alongside Lidio Andrés Feliz, Marileidy Paulino, Luguelín Santos, and Alexander Ogando in the mixed 4 × 400 metres relay. They set a national record of 3:12.74 during the heats, and they set a new national record in the finals to win the silver medal with 3:10.21. Medina and Paulino became the first female athletes to win an Olympic medal for the Dominican Republic.

Medina won a gold medal in the 4 × 100 metres relay at the 2022 Ibero-American Championships. At the 2023 Pan American Games, she won a gold medal in the 4 × 400 metres relay, a silver medal in the 4 × 400 metres relay, a bronze medal in the 4 × 100 metres relay. She was unable to compete at the 2023 World Championships due to an issue with her visa. She represented the Dominican Republic at the 2024 Summer Olympics in the mixed 4 × 400 metres relay, but the team finished 16th in the heats and did not advance.

== Personal life ==
Medina studied nutrition at the National Evangelical University (UNEV).
