= 2024 Ibero-American Championships in Athletics =

XX Ibero-American Championships in Athletics
- Dates: May 10–12
- Host city: Cuiabá, Brazil
- Venue: Centro de Treinamento Olímpico
- Level: Senior
- Events: 47 (23 men, 23 women, 1 mixed)
- Participation: 426 athletes from 23 nations

The 20th Ibero-American Championships in Athletics were held at the Centro de Treinamento Olímpico in Cuiabá, Brazil, between May 10 and 12, 2024.

== Medal summary ==
=== Men ===
Event	Gold		Silver		Bronze	
100 metres (wind: -0.8 m/s)	Felipe Bardi; Brazil	10.14	José González; Dominican Republic	10.25	Neiker Abello; Colombia	10.26
200 metres (wind: -0.1 m/s)	José González; Dominican Republic	20.27	Juan Ignacio Ciampitti; Argentina	20.48	Erik Cardoso; Brazil	20.50
400 metres	Elián Larregina; Argentina	45.27 NR	Omar Elkhatib; Portugal	45.46	Anthony Zambrano; Colombia	46.05 SB
800 metres	Chamar Chambers; Panama	1:45.27 NR	José Antonio Maita; Venezuela	1:45.55	Rafael Muñoz; Chile	1:46.37
1500 metres	Thiago André; Brazil	3:39.60	Víctor Ortiz; Puerto Rico	3:40.65	Carlos Sáez; Spain	3:41.07
3000 metres	David Ninavia; Bolivia	8:05.26 NR	Ignacio Velázquez; Chile	8:05.57	Pedro Marín; Colombia	8:10.22 PB
5000 metres	Altobeli da Silva; Brazil	14:27.38	Pedro Marín; Colombia	14:27.65	Wendell Souza; Brazil	14:27.73
10 kilometres (road)	Ilias Fifa; Spain	29:41	Miguel Baidal; Spain	30:00	Fabio Correia; Brazil	30:06
110 metres hurdles (wind: +2.8 m/s)	Eduardo de Deus; Brazil	13.24	Rafael Pereira; Brazil	13.35	Kevin Sánchez; Spain	13.43
400 metres hurdles	Mikael de Jesús; Portugal	49.20	Guillermo Campos; Mexico	49.27 NR	Yeral Núñez; Dominican Republic	49.60
3000 metres steeplechase	Alejandro Quijada; Spain	8:36.03	Altobeli da Silva; Brazil	8:37.13	Diddier Rodríguez; Panama	8:39.22
4 × 100 metres relay	Brazil; Rodrigo do Nascimento; Felipe Bardi; Erik Cardoso; Vinicius Moraes	39.19	Colombia; Neiker Abello; Carlos Flórez; Óscar Baltán; Jhonny Rentería	39.23	Argentina; Daniel Londero; Tomás Mondino; Juan Ignacio Ciampitti; Franco Florio	39.85 SB
4 × 400 metres relay	Mexico; Édgar Ramírez; Valente Mendoza; Guillermo Campos; Alejandro Díaz	3:05.73	Colombia; Jhon Perlaza; Luis Arrieta; Manuel Henao; Raúl Palacios	3:07.09 SB	Ecuador; Alan Minda; Steeven Salas; Katriel Angulo; Anderson Marquínez	3:08.47 SB
20 km walk (road)	Matheus Corrêa; Brazil	1:23:51	Álvaro López; Spain	1:24:32	Luis Henry Campos; Peru	1:24:54
High jump	Edgar Rivera; Mexico	2.20 m	Thiago Moura; Brazil	2.20 m SB	Fernando Ferreira; Brazil	2.15 m
Pole vault	Aleix Pi; Spain	5.45 m	Isidro Leyva; Spain	5.45 m	Lucas Alisson; Brazil	5.25 m SB
Long jump	Emiliano Lasa; Uruguay	7.98 m (-0.1)	Arnovis Dalmero; Colombia	7.97 m (+0.5)	Lucas dos Santos; Brazil	7.91 m (+0.2)
Triple jump	Almir dos Santos; Brazil	17.31 m (+0.7) CR, SB	Andy Hechavarría; Cuba	16.93 m (+0.6) SB	Geiner Moreno; Colombia	16.54 m (+0.2) SB
Shot put	Francisco Belo; Portugal	20.78 m SB	Darlan Romani; Brazil	20.53 m	Welington Morais; Brazil	20.51 m
Discus throw	Wellinton da Cruz Filho; Brazil	62.31 m SB	Diego Casas; Spain	61.91 m	Mario Díaz; Cuba	61.38 m
Hammer throw	Humberto Mansilla; Chile	75.08 m	Jerome Vega; Puerto Rico	73.20 m	Ronald Mencía; Cuba	73.20 m
Javelin throw	Pedro Henrique Rodrigues; Brazil	85.11 m CR, AR	Leandro Ramos; Portugal	83.09 m SB	Luiz Maurício da Silva; Brazil	82.02 m SB
Decathlon	Andy Preciado; Ecuador	7913 pts SB	Santiago Ford; Chile	7892 pts PB	Felipe dos Santos; Brazil	7547 pts

=== Women ===
Event	Gold		Silver		Bronze	
100 metres (wind: +0.6 m/s)	Gladymar Torres; Puerto Rico	11.21	Vitória Cristina Rosa; Brazil	11.23	Ángela Tenorio; Ecuador	11.26 SB
200 metres (wind: +0.2 m/s)	Aimara Nazareno; Ecuador	23.07	Anahí Suárez; Ecuador	23.20	Ana Azevedo; Brazil	23.31
400 metres	Gabby Scott; Puerto Rico	50.99 SB	Anabel Medina; Dominican Republic	51.35 PB	Nicole Caicedo; Ecuador	51.65 SB
800 metres	Berdine Castillo; Chile	2:00.84 PB	Jaqueline Weber; Brazil	2:01.64 SB	Déborah Rodríguez; Uruguay	2:03.32 SB
1500 metres	María Pía Fernández; Uruguay	4:11.65 SB	Anita Poma; Peru	4:12.33 NR	Alma Cortes; Mexico	4:12.36
3000 metres	Alma Cortes; Mexico	9:09.52 PB	Fedra Luna; Argentina	9:12.71 SB	Carolina Lozano; Argentina	9:17.59
5000 metres	Laura Priego; Spain	16:13.97 SB	Micaela Rivera Wood; Peru	16:14.56 SB	Carolina Lozano; Argentina	16:16.94
10 kilometres (road)	Mary Granja; Ecuador	34:25 CR, SB	Silvia Ortíz; Ecuador	34:43 PB	Alicia Berzosa; Spain	35:04
100 metres hurdles (wind: +0.2 m/s)	Paola Vásquez; Puerto Rico	13.03	Ketiley Batista; Brazil	13.22	Paula Blanquer; Spain	13.33 SB
400 metres hurdles	Grace Claxton; Puerto Rico	55.41 SB	Daniela Fra; Spain	55.73 PB	Chayenne da Silva; Brazil	56.22
3000 metres steeplechase	Tatiane Raquel da Silva; Brazil	9:46.25 SB	Simone Ferraz; Brazil	9:52.93	Alondra Negrón; Puerto Rico	10:01.19 SB
4 × 100 metres relay	Brazil; Gabriela Mourão; Ana Azevedo; Lorraine Martins; Vitória Cristina Rosa	43.54	Colombia; Marlet Ospino; Angélica Gamboa; Laura Martínez; Evelyn Rivera	44.34	Chile; Viviana Olivares; María Montt; Isidora Jiménez; Anaís Hernández	44.56
4 × 400 metres relay	Brazil; Anny de Bassi; Maria de Sena; Jainy Barreto; Letícia Lima	3:30.72 SB	Colombia; Rosana Palacios; Karla Vélez; Jennifer Padilla; Lina Licona	3:33.20 SB	Ecuador; Virginia Villalba; Anahí Suárez; Evelin Mercado; Nicole Caicedo	3:33.71 NR
20 km walk (road)	Evelyn Inga; Peru	1:32:46 CR	Paula Juárez; Spain	1:34:42	Gabriela de Sousa; Brazil	1:38:33 SB
High jump	Valdiléia Martins; Brazil	1.88 m	Marysabel Senyu; Dominican Republic	1.86 m SB	María Arboleda; Colombia	1.86 =PB
Pole vault	Robeilys Peinado; Venezuela	4.50 m SB	Andrea San José; Spain	4.35 m SB	Katherine Castillo; Colombia	4.30 m =NR
Long jump	Natalia Linares; Colombia	6.82 m (+0.9) SB	Lissandra Campos; Brazil	6.53 m (+0.7)	Eliane Martins; Brazil	6.47 m (-0.5)
Triple jump	Gabriele dos Santos; Brazil	13.68 m (-0.1)	Regiclecia Candido; Brazil	13.23 m (+0.3)	Valeria Quispe; Bolivia	13.11 m (+0.5)
Shot put	Eliana Bandeira; Portugal	18.30 m	Ivana Gallardo; Chile	17.26 m	Ana Caroline Silva; Brazil	17.18 m
Discus throw	Izabela da Silva; Brazil	63.60 m	Andressa de Morais; Brazil	60.37 m	Silinda Morales; Cuba	58.16 m SB
Hammer throw	Rosa Rodríguez; Venezuela	70.95 m	Ximena Zorrilla; Peru	68.47 m	Mayra Gaviria; Colombia	66.92 m
Javelin throw	Flor Ruiz; Colombia	66.70 m AR, WL	Jucilene de Lima; Brazil	62.31 m SB	Manuela Rotundo; Uruguay	61.84 m AU23R, NR
Heptathlon	Martha Araújo; Colombia	6274 pts CR, PB	Lilian Borja; Mexico	5637 pts SB	Tamara de Sousa; Brazil	5617 pts SB

=== Mixed ===
Event	Gold		Silver		Bronze	
4 × 400 metres relay	Brazil; Vitor de Miranda; Maria de Sena; Tiago da Silva; Letícia Lima	3:17.85 CR, SB	Ecuador; Alan Minda; Virginia Villalba; Steeven Salas; Evelin Mercado	3:23.63 SB	Colombia; Estebán Bermúdez; Nahomy Castro; Óscar Leal; Paola Loboa	3:25.10 NU20R

=== Medal table ===
* Host nation (Brazil)

Rank	Nation	Gold	Silver	Bronze	Total
1	Brazil*	16	12	15	43
2	Spain	4	7	4	15
3	Puerto Rico	4	2	1	7
4	Colombia	3	6	8	17
5	Ecuador	3	3	4	10
6	Mexico	3	2	1	6
7	Portugal	3	2	0	5
8	Chile	2	3	2	7
9	Venezuela	2	1	0	3
10	Uruguay	2	0	2	4
11	Dominican Republic	1	3	1	5
11	Peru	1	3	1	5
13	Argentina	1	2	3	6
14	Bolivia	1	0	1	2
14	Panama	1	0	1	2
16	Cuba	0	1	3	4
Totals (16 entries)		47	47	47	141

== Participating nations ==
A total of 427 athletes from 23 countries participated.

- Angola (1)
- Argentina (20)
- Bolivia (13)
- Brazil (80)
- Chile (36)
- Colombia (63)
- Costa Rica (1)
- Cuba (6)
- Dominican Republic (14)
- Ecuador (22)
- Guatemala (2)
- Honduras (3)
- Mexico (17)
- Panama (4)
- Paraguay (30)
- Peru (20)
- Portugal (26)
- Puerto Rico (13)
- El Salvador (4)
- São Tomé and Príncipe (1)
- Spain (28)
- Uruguay (5)
- Venezuela (17)
