= Jair Portillo =

Mexican high jumper (born 2002)

Personal information
- Nationality: Mexican
- Born: 28 September 2002 (age 24)

Sport
- Sport: Athletics
- Event: High jump

Achievements and titles
- Personal best: High jump: 2.27m (2024)
Medal record
Men's athletics
Representing Mexico
Pan American Championships
Gold medal – first place	2026 Medellín	High jump
Central American and Caribbean Games
Bronze medal – third place	2026 Santo Domingo	High jump

Jair Portillo (born 28 September 2002) is a Mexican high jumper. He became Mexico national champion in 2025, and won the gold medal at the inaugural Pan American Championships in 2026.

== Biography ==
From Cuauhtémoc, Chihuahua, Portillo is the younger brother of fellow high jumper Erick Portillo. They train with the support of the National Commission for Physical Culture and Sport (CONADE).

In June 2024, Portillo won the True Athletes Classics in Leverkusen, Germany, after jumping 2.24 metres. Portillo jumped a personal best 2.27 metres at the Mexican Championships in June 2024, finishing runner-up on count-back to his brother, Erick.

In January 2025, Portillo placed third at the Otrokovice Jump 2025 on the World Athletics Indoor Tour held in Otrokovice, Czech Republic. Portillo won the Mexican Championships in August 2025 with a clearance of 2.25 metres to win on count-back ahead of his brother, Erick. Later that month, Portillo had a top-eight finish representing Mexico at the 2025 NACAC Championships in Freeport, The Bahamas in August 2025.

Portillo opened his 2026 indoor season with a third-place finish at the VI Elmos International High Jump Gala, in Belgium in January 2026. The following month, he jumped 2.25 metres to place fifth overall in Hustopeče in February 2026. Selected for the inaugural 2026 Pan American Championships in Athletics in Medellín, he cleared 2.15 metres on 26 June to win the gold medal.

== Personal life ==
Alongside high jump, Portillo is a Mechatronics Engineering student at the National Technological Institute of Mexico in Ciudad Cuauhtémoc, Chihuahua.
