= Micaela Levaggi =

Argentine athlete

Personal information
- Nationality: Argentine
- Born: 12 August 1998 (age 28)

Sport
- Sport: Athletics
- Event: Middle-distance running

Achievements and titles
- Personal bests: 1500m: 4:05.50 AR (2026); 5000m: 15:48.90 (2026); 3000m S'chase: 9:42.09 (2025)
Medal record
Women's athletics
Representing Argentina
Pan American Championships
Gold medal – first place	2026 Medellín	3000 m st
Silver medal – second place	2026 Medellín	1500 m
Ibero-American Championships
Gold medal – first place	2026 Lima	1500 m
Gold medal – first place	2026 Lima	5000 m
South American Games
Gold medal – first place	2026 Santa Fe	1500 m
Gold medal – first place	2026 Santa Fe	5000 m
Bronze medal – third place	2026 Santa Fe	3000 m st
South American Championships
Gold medal – first place	2025 Mar del Plata	1500 m
Silver medal – second place	2025 Mar del Plata	3000 m st.

Micaela Levaggi (born 12 August 1998) is an Argentina middle-distance runner. She is the Argentina national record holder over 1500 metres, and became the South American Champion at that distance in 2025.

== Biography ==
She was born and raised in Mar del Plata, and started running at the age of 13 years-old with support from a public athleticism program run by the Mar del Plata Municipality and was coached by Leonardo Malgor. In 2014, at the age of 15 years-old, she won the South American Under-16 Cross Country Championships.

Levaggi won the silver medal at the 2014 South American Youth Championships in the 1500 metres and won a gold medal at the 2017 South American U20 Championships over 3000 metres, and bronze at the 2018 South American Games in the 1500m. She won the gold medal in the 1500 metres in Cuenca, Ecuador at the South American U23 Athletics Championships in September 2018.

She was the highest finishing Argentine at the Buenos Aires Half Marathon in 2024. She won the gold medal in the 1500 metres at the 2025 South American Athletics Championships in April 2025. At the same championships, she won a silver medal in the 3000 metres steeplechase.

Levaggi broke the Argentine national record for the 1500 metres whilst competing in Spain in July 2025, running a time of 4:10.92 at the Ordizia Meeting, beating the record previously held by Fedra Luna. In September 2025, she competed over 1500 metres at the 2025 World Championships in Tokyo, Japan, without advancing to the semi-finals but running a national record 4:09.76.

In May 2026, she won over 1500 metres and 5000 metres at the 2026 Ibero-American Championships in Athletics in Peru. She won the 1500 metres gold medal at the 2026 South American Games.
