= Mylana Hearn =

American triple jumper (born 1995)

Personal information
- Born: 5 March 1995 (age 31)

Sport
- Sport: Athletics
- Event: Triple jump

Achievements and titles
- Personal best: Triple jump: 13.81m (2024)
Medal record
Women's athletics
Representing United States
Pan American Championships
Bronze medal – third place	2026 Medellín	Triple jump

Mylana Hearn (born 5 March 1995) is an American triple jumper. She was runner-up at the 2025 USA Indoor Track and Field Championships.

== Career ==
She attended Texas State University and was runner-up in the Sun Belt Conference championships, both indoors and outdoors, in 2016.

She competed in the triple jump at the 2023 Pan American Games in Santiago, Chile in November 2023.

She set a new personal best of 13.81 metres competing in Albuquerque, New Mexico, in February 2024. She jumped 13.78 metres to finish runner-up to Natricia Hooper at the LSU Invitational in April 2024.

She was runner-up to Jasmine Moore at the 2025 USA Indoor Track and Field Championships in New York, on February 23, 2025. She jumped 13.39 metres to place fifth at the 2025 USA Outdoor Track and Field Championships in Eugene, Oregon.
