= Daily Cooper Gaspar =

Cuban middle-distance runner (born 2002)

Daily Cooper
Personal information
- Nationality: Cuba
- Born: 11 March 2002 (age 24)

Sport
- Sport: Athletics
- Event: Middle distance running

Achievements and titles
- Personal bests: 800m: 1:56.10 (Medellín, 2026); 1500m 4:11.25 (San Salvador, 2023)
Medal record
Women's athletics
Representing Cuba
Pan American Games
Silver medal – second place	2023 Santiago	1500 m
Pan American Championships
Gold medal – first place	2026 Medellín	800 m
Gold medal – first place	2026 Medellín	1500 m
Central American and Caribbean Games
Gold medal – first place	2026 Santo Domingo	800 m
Gold medal – first place	2026 Santo Domingo	1500 m
Bronze medal – third place	2023 San Salvador	1500 m
Junior Pan American Games
Gold medal – first place	2021 Cali-Valle	800 m

Daily Cooper Gaspar (born 11 March 2002) is a Cuban middle-distance runner.

== Biography ==
She won the 800m at the Junior Pan American Championships in Colombia in 2021. She won bronze in the 1500m at the CAC Games in 2023 in San Salvador. She was a silver medalist over 1500 metres at the 2023 Pan American Games.

She lowered her 800m personal best to 2:00.45 in April 2024. She ran another 800 metres personal best time of 1:58.61 in Guadalajara in June 2024. She competed at the 2024 Paris Olympics over 800 metres and qualified for the semi finals, running 1:58.88. In the semi-final she lowered her personal best but did not reach the final. She also competed in the women's 4 × 400 m relay at the Games.

In September 2025, she was a semi-finalist in the women's 800 metres at the 2025 World Athletics Championships in Tokyo, Japan.

In June 2026, Cooper ran a new personal best 1:56.10 win the gold medal over 800 metres at the inaugural 2026 Pan American Championships in Medellín, also winning the 1500 metres gold medal at the championships. In August, she again won double gold medals in the 800 and 1500 metres at the 2026 CAC Games in Santo Domingo, Dominican Republic.
