= Yeral Núñez =

Dominican Republic athlete

Personal information
- Full name: Yeral Núñez Mercedes
- Nationality: Dominican Republic
- Born: 9 January 2003 (age 23)

Sport
- Sport: Athletics
- Event: 400 metres hurdles

Achievements and titles
- Personal best: 400m hurdles: 47.77s (2026)
Medal record
Men's athletics
Representing Dominican Republic
Pan American Championships
Gold medal – first place	2026 Medellín	400 m hurdles
Gold medal – first place	2026 Medellín	4×400 m relay
Pan American Games
Bronze medal – third place	2023 Santiago	4 x 400 m relay

Yeral Núñez Mercedes (born 9 January 2003) is a hurdler from the Dominican Republic. He won national championships titles in the 400m hurdles in 2023 and 2024 and competed at the 2024 Summer Olympics.

== Biography ==
Núñez is coached by two-time Olympic champion Félix Sánchez. He ran a Dominican Republic national U20 record of 50.07 for the 400 metres hurdles in June 2022.

Núñez ran 49.43 seconds to win the senior national title over 400m hurdles for the first time, in April 2023. He won bronze in the 400m hurdles at the 2023 NACAC U23 Championships in San Jose, Costa Rica. He qualified for the final of the 400 metres hurdles at the senior 2023 Central American and Caribbean Games in July 2023. He finished fourth in the 400m hurdles at the 2023 Pan American Games in Santiago.

Núñez competed for the Dominican Republic at the World Relays in Nassau, Bahamas in May 2024. That month, he won bronze in the 400m hurdles at the 2024 Ibero-American Championships in Brazil. His 4 × 400 m relay team won their race but were disallowed for a lane infringement. Núñez ran 49.05 seconds to retain his national 400m hurdles title in June 2024.

Núñez was selected to compete for Dominican Republic at the 2024 Paris Olympics. He ran as part of the mixed 4 × 400 m relay. He also ran in the 400m hurdles.

In June 2026, Núñez ran 48.20 seconds to win the inaugural 400 metres hurdles title at the 2026 Pan American Championships in Athletics in Medellín. In September, he competed in the 400 m hurdles at the inaugural World Ultimate Championship in Budapest.

== Personal life ==
He is from La Romana, Dominican Republic.
