= Liranyi Alonso =

Dominican Republic sprinter

Personal information
- Full name: Liranyi Arislayne Alonso Tejada
- Born: 28 December 2005 (age 20) La Vega, La Vega, Dominican Republic

Sport
- Country: Dominican Republic
- Sport: Sprint
- Events: 60 metres; 100 metres; 200 metres; 4 x 100 metres
- Coached by: José Ludwig Rubio

Achievements and titles
- Personal bests: 100 m: 11.04 NR (Bayaguana 2025); 100 m: 11.10 GR (Santo Domingo 2026); 200 m: 22.69 (Asunción 2025); Indoors; 60 m: 7.31 NR (Fayetteville 2025)
Medal record
Women's athletics
Representing Dominican Republic
NACAC Championships
Silver medal – second place	2025 Freeport	100 m
Pan American Games
Bronze medal – third place	2023 Santiago	4×100 m relay
Pan American Championships
Gold medal – first place	2026 Medellín	4×100 m relay
Gold medal – first place	2026 Medellín	4×100 m mixed relay
Bronze medal – third place	2026 Medellín	100 m
Ibero-American Championships
Bronze medal – third place	2026 Lima	100 m
Central American and Caribbean Games
Gold medal – first place	2026 Santo Domingo	4 × 100 m relay
Gold medal – first place	2026 Santo Domingo	4 × 100 m mixed relay
Gold medal – first place	2026 Santo Domingo	200 m
Gold medal – first place	2026 Santo Domingo	100 m
Bronze medal – third place	2023 San Salvador	4×100 m relay
Bolivarian Games
Gold medal – first place	2025 Lima-Ayacucho	100 m
Silver medal – second place	2025 Lima-Ayacucho	4×100 m relay
Junior Pan American Games
Gold medal – first place	2025 Asunción	200 m
Silver medal – second place	2025 Asunción	100 m
Bronze medal – third place	2021 Cali-Valle	Mixed relay
- Updated on August 2025

Liranyi Arislayne Alonso Tejada (born 28 December 2005) is a Dominican athlete sprinter specializing in the 100 and 200 meters.

She won the silver medal at the 2025 NACAC Championships and won the bronze in the 2023 Pan American Games and 2023 Central American and Caribbean Games 4 × 100 m relay. She won the 2025 Junior Pan American Games gold in 200 m and silver in 100 m, having won the bronze in the 4×400 m relay mixed in the 2021 Junior Pan American Games. She became national champion in 100 m in 2023, 24 and 25 and 200 m champion in 2025. She is the Dominican record holder in 60 m and 100 m.

She is a Private from the Dominican Air Force and is coached by the Dominican José Ludwig Rubio.

== Career ==
She made her debut on the world level at the 2021 World U20 Championships, where she reached the semi-final, followed by the 2021 Junior Pan American Games where she won a bronze medal in the mixed relay, finished fourth in the 100 metres and 4 × 100 metres relay, and was disqualified in the 200 metres and 4 × 400 metres relay. At her second World U20 Championships in 2022, she reached the semi-final in the 100 and 200 metres. She finished fifth in the 100 metres at the 2022 Bolivarian Games and seventh at the 2023 Central American and Caribbean Games, but here she won her first international senior medal, a bronze in the 4 × 100 metres relay. The Dominican Republic team followed up with another relay bronze at the 2023 Pan American Games, where Alonso finished fifth individually. Late in the season, she set a personal best of 11.37 seconds in Cali.

In 2024 she competed at the World Athletics Relays and at her third World U20 Championships.

Alonso's breakthrough came in 2025. She first ran two indoor meets in the US, setting a 60 metres time of 7.31 seconds – a national record – before lowering her 100 metres PB to 11.25 at the first outdoor meet in Bayaguana. Three weeks later, she ran 11.17 in Santiago de los Caballeros—returning to the US in June to run 11.15 in Winter Garden. During the European summer meet circuit, she further improved to 11.14 in Varberg and 11.13 in Schifflange. At the 2025 domestic championships, she ran 11.14 in the heat and 11.04 in the final. Two weeks later, 11.10 gave her the silver medal at the 2025 NACAC Championships, and one week after that, she won the 100 metres silver and 200 metres gold at the 2025 Junior Pan American Games. Her winning time in the 200 metres was a championship record, as was the 100 metres time of 11.08 which she achieved in the heats. She also qualified for the 2025 World Championships.

== Athletics achievements ==
Information from her World Athletics profile unless otherwise noted.

=== Personal bests ===
Type	Distance	Time (s)	Wind (m/s)	Venue	Date	Notes
Individual events
Outdoor	60 metres	7.13	-0.6	Moscow, Russia	6 June 2026	NR
Outdoor	100 metres	11.04	-0.8	Bayaguana, Dominican Republic	1 August 2025	NR
Outdoor	200 metres	22.53	+1.2	Santo Domingo, Dominican Republic	22 August 2026	
Team events
Indoor	4 × 100 metres relay	43.00	—N/a	Santo Domingo, Dominican Republic	6 August 2026	NR
Indoor	Mixed 4 × 100 metres relay	40.89	—N/a	Santo Domingo, Dominican Republic	4 August 2026	

=== International competitions ===
Representing Dominican Republic
Year	Competition	Venue	Position	Event	Time	Notes
2021	Junior Pan American Games	Cali, Colombia	3rd	Mixed 4 × 400 m relay	3:28.28	
2023	Central American and Caribbean Games	San Salvador, El Salvador	7th	100 m	11.58	
2023	Central American and Caribbean Games	San Salvador, El Salvador	3rd	4 × 100 m relay	43.45	
2023	Pan American Games	Santiago, Chile	5th	100 m	11.63	
2023	Pan American Games	Santiago, Chile	3rd	4 × 100 m relay	44.32	
2024	World Relays	Nassau, The Bahamas	26th (h)	4 × 100 m relay	44.72	
2024	World U20 Championships	Lima, Peru	23rd (sf)	100 m	11.89	
2025	NACAC Championships	Freeport, The Bahamas	2nd	100 m	11.10	
2025	Junior Pan American Games	Asunción, Paraguay	2nd	100 m	11.40	
2025	Junior Pan American Games	Asunción, Paraguay	1st	200 m	22.69	GR
2025	World Championships	Tokyo, Japan	16th (sf)	100 m	11.16	
2025	World Championships	Tokyo, Japan	—	200 m	DNS	
2025	Bolivarian Games	Lima, Peru	1st	100 m	11.40	
2025	Bolivarian Games	Lima, Peru	2nd	4 × 100 m relay	44.23	
2025	Bolivarian Games	Lima, Peru	5th	Mixed 4 × 100 m relay	42.99	
2026	World Indoor Championships	Toruń, Poland	14th (sf)	60	7.19	
2026	Ibero-American Championships	Lima, Peru	3rd	100 m	11.19	
2026	Ibero-American Championships	Lima, Peru	—	4 × 100 m relay	DNF	
2026	Pan American Championships	Medellín, Colombia	3rd	100 m	11.18	
2026	Pan American Championships	Medellín, Colombia	4th	200 m	23.13	
2026	Pan American Championships	Medellín, Colombia	1st	4 × 100 m relay	43.29	
2026	Pan American Championships	Medellín, Colombia	1st	Mixed 4 × 100 m relay	40.92	NR
2026	Central American and Caribbean Games	Santo Domingo, Dominican Republic	1st	100 m	11.10	GR
2026	Central American and Caribbean Games	Santo Domingo, Dominican Republic	1st	200 m	23.07	
2026	Central American and Caribbean Games	Santo Domingo, Dominican Republic	1st	4 × 100 m relay	43.00	GR
2026	Central American and Caribbean Games	Santo Domingo, Dominican Republic	1st	Mixed 4 × 100 m relay	40.89	GR
2026	World Athletics Ultimate Championship	Budapest, Hungary	14th (sf)	200 m	22.96	
