= Anaís Hernández =

Chilean sprinter (born 2001)

Personal information
- Full name: Anaís Valentina Hernández Alegría
- Born: 5 March 2001 (age 25)

Sport
- Sport: Athletics
- Event: Sprint

Achievements and titles
- Personal bests: 60m: 7.31 (Cochabamba, 2025); 100m: 11.42 (Mar del Plata, 2025); 200m: 23.46 (Santiago, 2025)
Medal record
Women's athletics
Representing Chile
Pan American Games
Silver medal – second place	2023 Santiago	4×100 m relay
Pan American Championships
Bronze medal – third place	2026 Medellín	4×100 m relay
Ibero-American Championships
Bronze medal – third place	2024 Cuiabá	4×100 m relay
South American Championships
Bronze medal – third place	2023 São Paulo	4×400 m relay
Bronze medal – third place	2023 São Paulo	4×100 m relay
South American Indoor Championships
Bronze medal – third place	2024 Cochabamba	60 m
Bronze medal – third place	2025 Cochabamba	60 m
Bolivarian Games
Bronze medal – third place	2025 Ayacucho-Lima	4×100 m relay
Junior Pan American Games
Silver medal – second place	2021 Cali-Valle	4×400 m relay
South American U23 Championships
Silver medal – second place	2021 Guayaquil	4×400 m relay
Bronze medal – third place	2021 Guayaquil	4×100 m relay
Bronze medal – third place	2022 Cascavel	4×400 m relay
South American U20 Championships
Bronze medal – third place	2019 Cali	4×400 m relay

Anaís Valentina Hernández Alegría (born 5 March 2001) is a Chilean sprinter. A national champion over 200 metres, she has represented Chile at multiple international events.

== Biography ==
Hernandez is from Iquique, Chile. She started in athletics at the age of six years-old and had success as a junior athlete. She studied at Humberstone College in Iquique, and gained early international experience at the 2018 Youth Olympic Games in Buenos Aires, Argentina. She studied for a degree in Nutrition and Dietetics at the University of Chile in Santiago and competed at the 2019 Summer Universiade.

Hernández trained alone in Santiago during the COVID-19 pandemic. She was a silver medalist in the 4 x 400 metres relay and a bronze medalist in the 4 x 100 metres relay at the 2021 South American Under-23 Championships in Athletics. The following month, she was a silver medalist at the 2021 Junior Pan American Games in Cali, Colombia, in the 4 x 400 metres relay. She was also a bronze medalist in the 4 x 400 metres at the 2022 South American Under-23 Championships in Athletics in Brazil.

She won bronze medals at the 2023 South American Championships in both the 4 x 100 metres and 4 x 400 metres. She was a silver medalist in the 4 x 100 metres at the 2023 Pan American Games, as the Chilean team set a new national record in both the semi-final and the final. She also competed in the 100 metres at the Games.

She was a bronze medalist over 60 metres at the 2024 South American Indoor Championships in Athletics in January 2024, in Bolivia. She subsequently competed for Chile over 60 metres at the 2024 World Athletics Indoor Championships in Glasgow, Scotland. She became Chilean national champion over 200 metres in April 2024. She was a bronze medalist in the 4 x 100 metres at the 2024 Ibero-American Championships in Athletics in Brazil. She ran as part of the 4 × 100 m relay team at the 2024 World Relays Championships in Nassau, Bahamas.

She was a bronze medalist over 60 metres at the 2025 South American Indoor Championships in Athletics. She retained her Chilean national championships title over 200 metres in March 2025. She also finished second in the 100 metres at the Championships. She competed for Chile at the 2025 World Athletics Relays in Guangzhou, China, helping the national team qualify for the upcoming World Championships in the 4 x 100 metres relay. She subsequently competed in the women's 4 x 100 metres at the 2025 World Championships in Tokyo, Japan, as part of the Chilean team which placed fifth in their heat.
