= Joseph Brown (discus thrower) =

American athlete (born 1996)

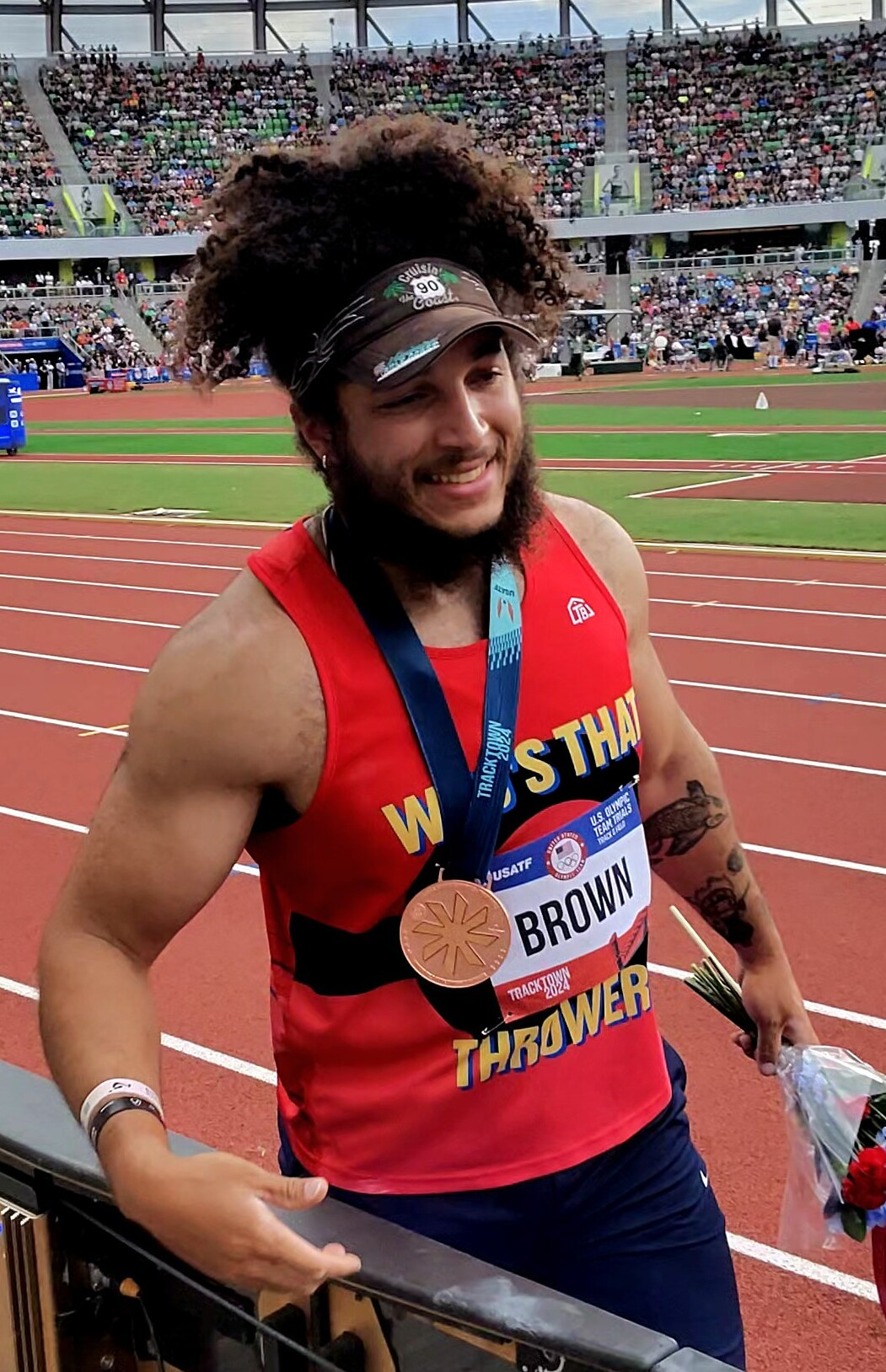
- Brown in 2024

Personal information
- Nationality: American
- Born: June 13, 1996 (age 30)
- Home town: Mansfield, Texas, U.S.
- Education: Texas A&M University–Commerce
- Height: 6 ft 2 in (188 cm)

Sport
- Sport: Athletics
- Event: Discus

Achievements and titles
- Personal bests: Discus: 67.92m (Ramona, 2024)

Joseph Brown (born June 13, 1996) is an American discus thrower. He finished third in the US Olympic trials in 2024.

== Early life ==
Brown is from Mansfield, Texas, and attended Mansfield High School. Although he was a member of the track team, he never competed in the state meet. He won the NCAA Division II national championship in the discus with a throw of 59.54 metres for Texas A&M University–Commerce in 2019.

== Career ==
Brown represented the United States at the 2023 Pan American Games in Santiago, placing fifth overall with a throw of 60.14 metres.

While being self-coached, he finished third in the US Olympic trials in June 2024 in Eugene, Oregon with a throw of 65.79 metres. He was in eighth place prior to his final throw, and made the US Olympic Team by finishing third, ahead of Reggie Jagers III, by a margin of two inches. He subsequently competed in the discus throw at the 2024 Summer Olympics in Paris in August 2024.
