= Yohandris Andújar =

Dominican Republic sprinter

Personal information
- Full name: Yohandris Andújar de la Cruz
- Born: 5 July 1990 (age 36) San Pedro de Macorís, Dominican Republic

Sport
- Country: Dominican Republic
- Sport: Athletics

Yohandris Andújar de la Cruz (born 5 July 1990) is a Dominican sprinter. He competed in the men's 4 × 100 metres relay at the 2016 Summer Olympics.
