= Austin Miller (pole vaulter) =

American pole vaulter (born 1994)

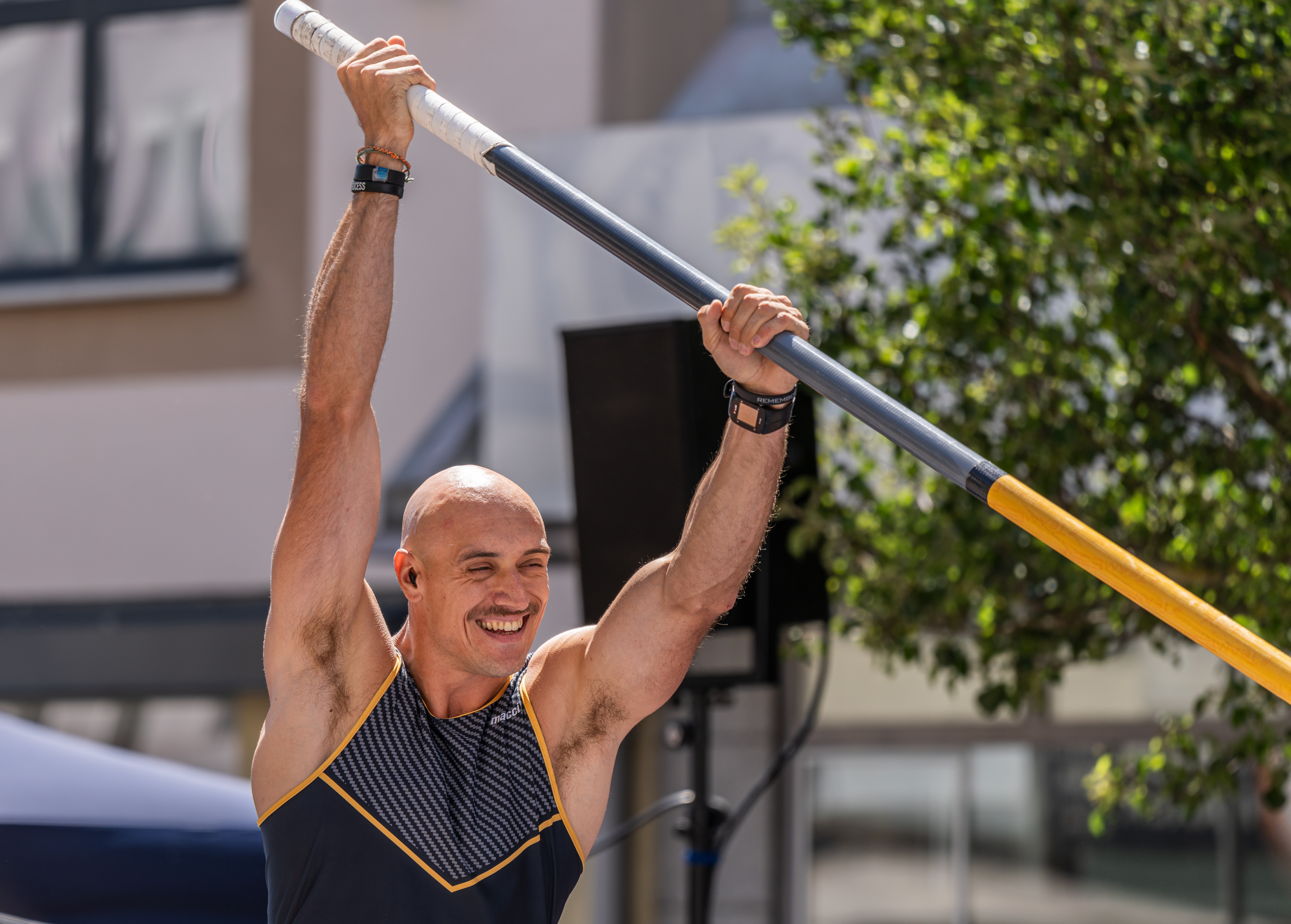
- Miller in Hof, Germany (2025)

Personal information
- Nationality: American
- Born: June 1, 1994 (age 32)
- Home town: Herndon, Virginia, U.S.
- Education: Herndon High School; High Point University
- Height: 190 cm (6 ft 3 in)
- Weight: 82 kg (181 lb)

Sport
- Country: United States
- Sport: Track and field
- Event: Pole vault
- College team: Highpoint Panthers
- Club: Vaulthouse
- Coached by: Scott Houston; Earl Bell

Achievements and titles
- National finals: 2018 USA Indoors; • Pole vault, 9th; 2018 USA Champs; • Pole vault, 8th; 2019 USA Indoors; • Pole vault, 4th; 2019 USA Champs; • Pole vault, 15th; 2020 USA Indoors; • Pole vault, 16th; 2021 USA Champs; • Pole vault, 12th; 2022 USA Indoors; • Pole vault, 6th; 2022 USA Champs; • Pole vault, 13th; 2023 USA Indoors; • Pole vault, 7th; 2023 USA Champs; • Pole vault, 12th; 2024 USA Indoors; • Pole vault, 3rd (bronze); 2025 USA Champs; • Pole vault, 1st (gold)
- Personal best: PV: 5.92m (2025)
- Updated on January 1, 2024

Austin Miller (born June 1, 1994) is an American pole vaulter. He won the bronze medal at the 2024 USA Indoor Track and Field Championships in the pole vault.

== Career ==
Miller competed in lacrosse and a variety of track and field events at Herndon High School in Virginia, and he was a district champion in the pole vault. He originally joined the High Point Panthers track and field program as a potential decathlete, but he switched to specializing in pole vault soon after joining the team.

At High Point, Miller set the school record in the pole vault but never qualified for an NCAA Division I outdoor or indoor national championship, qualifying for the East preliminary round in 2015 and 2016. His senior year, Scott Houston joined the coaching staff and convinced Miller to continue competing after college.

With the help of Houston and Earl Bell, he qualified for his first national final in 2018, placing 9th at the USA Indoor Championships. After improving to 8th outdoors, Miller sustained two injuries in 2019 despite a 4th-place finish at that year's indoor championships.

Miller's best national performance was at the 2024 USA Indoor Track and Field Championships, where he finished 3rd behind Chris Nilsen and Sam Kendricks. At the 2024 Xiamen Diamond League, he finished 4th.

== Personal life ==
Miller is from Herndon, Virginia. He competes for the Vaulthouse club in North Carolina.

In addition to being an athlete, Miller currently coaches pole vault at the Vault House club and at Ragsdale High School. He also coaches club-level lacrosse at his alma mater High Point University. Additionally, he worked as a security guard for a music venue in Greensboro, North Carolina and writes for This Song Is Sick, a music publication.

He has said he will pursue a career in the music industry after he retires from pole vaulting.

== Statistics ==
=== Personal best progression ===
Pole Vault progression
#	Mark	Pl.	Competition	Venue	Date	Ref.
1	5.05 m	1st place, gold medalist(s)	Carolina-Greensboro Spartan Team Challenge, JDL Fast Track	Winston-Salem, NC	January 24, 2015	
2	5.07 m	1st place, gold medalist(s)	High Point VertKlasse	High Point, NC	April 3, 2015	
3	5.22 m	10th	Virginia Tech Challenge, Rector Fieldhouse	Blacksburg, VA	February 19, 2016	
4	5.25 m	1st place, gold medalist(s)	Big South Outdoor Track & Field Championships	Lynchburg, VA	May 11, 2016	
5	5.41 m	1st place, gold medalist(s)	Duke Invitational, Morris Williams Stadium	Durham, NC	April 21, 2017	
6	5.51 m A	1st place, gold medalist(s)	National Pole Vault Summit, Livestock Events Center	Reno, NV	January 12, 2018	
7	5.53 m A	9th	USA Indoor Track and Field Championships	Albuquerque, NM	February 16, 2018	
8	5.55 m	8th	USA Outdoor Track and Field Championships	Des Moines, IA	June 22, 2018	
9	5.73 m	1st place, gold medalist(s)	Rocket Man Pole Vault Summer Series	Mooresville, NC	July 21, 2020	
10	5.76 m	1st place, gold medalist(s)	GOLDEN FLY Series Street competition	Bangkok, Thailand	February 24, 2023	
11	5.80 m	1st place, gold medalist(s)	Annual Mt. SAC Relays	Walnut, CA	April 14, 2023	
12	5.81 m	2nd place, silver medalist(s)	Mityng Na Rynku Kościuszki	Białystok, Poland	May 20, 2023	
13	5.90 m	1st place, gold medalist(s)	Doc Hale Virginia Tech Invitational	Blacksburg, VA	February 2, 2024	
14	5.92 m	1st place, gold medalist(s)	USA Outdoor Track and Field Championships	Eugene, OR	August 2, 2025	
