= Pan American Championships in Athletics =

Biennial sports event for track and field

The Pan American Championships in Athletics are a biennial sports event for track and field organized by the Association of Panamerican Athletics (Panam Athletics) for Senior athletes from member and associate member associations. They were first held in 2026 in Medellín.

== Editions ==
| Edition | Year | City | Country | Date | Venue | No. of Events | No. of Athletes | Top of the medal table | Top of the points table |
|---|---|---|---|---|---|---|---|---|---|
| 1 | 2026 | Medellín | Colombia | 26–28 June | Estadio Alfonso Galvis Duque | 45 | 350 (29 Countries) | Dominican Republic | Colombia |
| 2 | 2028 | Santo Domingo | Dominican Republic | 1–4 July | Estadio Olímpico Félix Sanchez | | | | |

== Medals (2026–) ==
| Rank | Nation | Gold | Silver | Bronze | Total |
|---|---|---|---|---|---|
| 1 | Dominican Republic | 8 | 2 | 2 | 12 |
| 2 | Brazil | 7 | 5 | 4 | 16 |
| 3 | Canada | 5 | 5 | 3 | 13 |
| 4 | Colombia | 4 | 5 | 11 | 20 |
| 5 | Cuba | 4 | 1 | 0 | 5 |
| 6 | Ecuador | 3 | 4 | 2 | 9 |
| 7 | Puerto Rico | 2 | 5 | 5 | 12 |
| 8 | Mexico | 2 | 3 | 3 | 8 |
| 9 | Chile | 2 | 1 | 3 | 6 |
| 10 | Argentina | 2 | 1 | 2 | 5 |
| 11 | United States | 1 | 4 | 5 | 10 |
| 12 | Peru | 1 | 2 | 1 | 4 |
| 13 | Paraguay | 1 | 0 | 1 | 2 |
| 14 | Guatemala | 1 | 0 | 0 | 1 |
| 14 | U.S. Virgin Islands | 1 | 0 | 0 | 1 |
| 14 | Uruguay | 1 | 0 | 0 | 1 |
| 17 | Venezuela | 0 | 4 | 1 | 5 |
| 18 | Panama | 0 | 2 | 0 | 2 |
| 19 | Costa Rica | 0 | 1 | 0 | 1 |
| 20 | Bolivia | 0 | 0 | 1 | 1 |
| Totals (20 entries) | | 45 | 45 | 44 | 134 |

== Championships records ==
=== Men ===
| Event | Record | Athlete | Nationality | Date | Meet | Place | Ref. |
|---|---|---|---|---|---|---|---|
| 100 m | 9.85 (+1.5 m/s) A | Ronal Longa | Colombia | 26 June 2026 | 2026 Pan American Championships | Medellín, Colombia | |
| 200 m | 19.87 (+0.4 m/s) A | José Figueroa | Puerto Rico | 27 June 2026 | 2026 Pan American Championships | Medellín, Colombia | |
| 400 m | 44.67 A | Gabriel Moronta | Dominican Republic | 28 June 2026 | 2026 Pan American Championships | Medellín, Colombia | |
| 800 m | 1:45.07 A | Eduardo Moreira | Brazil | 28 June 2026 | 2026 Pan American Championships | Medellín, Colombia | |
| 1500 m | 3:40.20 A | Foster Malleck | Canada | 27 June 2026 | 2026 Pan American Championships | Medellín, Colombia | |
| 5000 m | 14:30.53 A | Matías Reynaga | Argentina | 26 June 2026 | 2026 Pan American Championships | Medellín, Colombia | |
| 10,000 m | 29:45.06 A | Luis Masabanda | Ecuador | 28 June 2026 | 2026 Pan American Championships | Medellín, Colombia | |
| 110 m hurdles | 13.40 (−2.5 m/s) A | Marcos Herrera | Ecuador | 27 June 2026 | 2026 Pan American Championships | Medellín, Colombia | |
| 400 m hurdles | 48.20 A | Yeral Núñez | Dominican Republic | 27 June 2026 | 2026 Pan American Championships | Medellín, Colombia | |
| 3000 m steeplechase | 8:56.77 A | César Gómez | Mexico | 28 June 2026 | 2026 Pan American Championships | Medellín, Colombia | |
| 4 × 100 m relay | 38.34 A | Franquelo Pérez; Yohandris Andújar; Melbin Marcelino; Yancarlos Martínez | Dominican Republic | 28 June 2026 | 2026 Pan American Championships | Medellín, Colombia | |
| 4 × 400 m relay | 3:01.20 A | Lidio Andrés Feliz; Yeral Núñez; Christopher Melenciano; Gabriel Moronta | Dominican Republic | 28 June 2026 | 2026 Pan American Championships | Medellín, Colombia | |
| Half marathon walk | 1:27.03 A | Iván Oña | Ecuador | 28 June 2026 | 2026 Pan American Championships | Medellín, Colombia | |
| High jump | 2.15 m A | Jair Portillo | Mexico | 26 June 2026 | 2026 Pan American Championships | Medellín, Colombia | |
| Pole vault | 5.81 m A | Austin Miller | United States | 28 June 2026 | 2026 Pan American Championships | Medellín, Colombia | |
| Long jump | 7.99 m (+0.5 m/s) A | Emiliano Lasa | Uruguay | 27 June 2026 | 2026 Pan American Championships | Medellín, Colombia | |
| Triple jump | 17.24 m (−1.0 m/s) A | Almir dos Santos | Brazil | 28 June 2026 | 2026 Pan American Championships | Medellín, Colombia | |
| Shot put | 20.53 m A | Willian Dourado | Brazil | 26 June 2026 | 2026 Pan American Championships | Medellín, Colombia | |
| Discus throw | 65.30 m A | Claudio Romero | Chile | 28 June 2026 | 2026 Pan American Championships | Medellín, Colombia | |
| Hammer throw | 75.38 m A | Humberto Mansilla | Chile | 26 June 2026 | 2026 Pan American Championships | Medellín, Colombia | |
| Javelin throw | 82.10 m A | Lars Flaming | Paraguay | 28 June 2026 | 2026 Pan American Championships | Medellín, Colombia | |

=== Women ===
| Event | Record | Athlete | Nationality | Date | Meet | Place | Ref. |
|---|---|---|---|---|---|---|---|
| 100 m | 11.10 (+0.4 m/s) A | Sade McCreath | Canada | 26 June 2026 | 2026 Pan American Championships | Medellín, Colombia | |
| 200 m | 22.64 (−1.3 m/s) A | Audrey Leduc | Canada | 27 June 2026 | 2026 Pan American Championships | Medellín, Colombia | |
| 400 m | 50.68 A | Lauren Gale | Canada | 26 June 2026 | 2026 Pan American Championships | Medellín, Colombia | |
| 800 m | 1:56.10 A | Daily Cooper Gaspar | Cuba | 28 June 2026 | 2026 Pan American Championships | Medellín, Colombia | |
| 1500 m | 4:22.72 A | Daily Cooper Gaspar | Cuba | 28 June 2026 | 2026 Pan American Championships | Medellín, Colombia | |
| 5000 m | 16:37.48 A | Anisleidis Ochoa | Cuba | 26 June 2026 | 2026 Pan American Championships | Medellín, Colombia | |
| 10,000 m | 34:41.95 A | Viviana Aroche | Guatemala | 28 June 2026 | 2026 Pan American Championships | Medellín, Colombia | |
| 100 m hurdles | 12.59 (+1.0 m/s) A | Vitória Alves | Brazil | 27 June 2026 | 2026 Pan American Championships | Medellín, Colombia | |
| 400 m hurdles | 54.93 A | Michelle Smith | U.S. Virgin Islands | 27 June 2026 | 2026 Pan American Championships | Medellín, Colombia | |
| 3000 m steeplechase | 9:46.90 A | Micaela Levaggi | Argentina | 28 June 2026 | 2026 Pan American Championships | Medellín, Colombia | |
| 4 × 100 m relay | 33.29 A | Patricia Sine; Fiordaliza Cofil; Estrella de Aza; Liranyi Alonso | Dominican Republic | 28 June 2026 | 2026 Pan American Championships | Medellín, Colombia | |
| 4 × 400 m relay | 3:29.49 A | Paola Loboa; Melany Bolaño; María Alejandra Rocha; Lina Licona | Colombia | 28 June 2026 | 2026 Pan American Championships | Medellín, Colombia | |
| Half marathon walk | 1:35:34 A | Evelyn Inga | Peru | 28 June 2026 | 2026 Pan American Championships | Medellín, Colombia | |
| High jump | 1.92 m A | Marysabel Senyu | Dominican Republic | 28 June 2026 | 2026 Pan American Championships | Medellín, Colombia | |
| Pole vault | 4.45 m A | Juliana Campos | Brazil | 26 June 2026 | 2026 Pan American Championships | Medellín, Colombia | |
| Long jump | 6.64 m (+1.8 m/s) A | Alysbeth Félix | Puerto Rico | 26 June 2026 | 2026 Pan American Championships | Medellín, Colombia | |
| Triple jump | 14.18 m (+0.2 m/s) A | Gabriele dos Santos | Brazil | 28 June 2026 | 2026 Pan American Championships | Medellín, Colombia | |
| Shot put | 18.12 m A | Dianelis Delís | Cuba | 26 June 2026 | 2026 Pan American Championships | Medellín, Colombia | |
| Discus throw | 58.87 m A | Andressa de Morais | Brazil | 26 June 2026 | 2026 Pan American Championships | Medellín, Colombia | |
| Hammer throw | 70.37 m A | Jillian Weir | Canada | 28 June 2026 | 2026 Pan American Championships | Medellín, Colombia | |
| Javelin throw | 60.72 m A | Valentina Barrios | Colombia | 27 June 2026 | 2026 Pan American Championships | Medellín, Colombia | |
| Heptathlon | 6357 pts A | María Fernanda Murillo | Colombia | 27–28 June 2026 | 2026 Pan American Championships | Medellín, Colombia | |

=== Mixed ===
| Event | Record | Athlete | Nationality | Date | Meet | Place | Ref. |
|---|---|---|---|---|---|---|---|
| 4 × 100 m relay | 40.92 A | Yohandris Andújar; Fiordaliza Cofil; Melbin Marcelino; Liranyi Alonso | Dominican Republic | 27 June 2026 | 2026 Pan American Championships | Medellín, Colombia | |
| 4 × 400 m relay | 3:13.83 A | Erick Sánchez; Anabel Medina; Christopher Melenciano; Estrella de Aza | Dominican Republic | 26 June 2026 | 2026 Pan American Championships | Medellín, Colombia | |
