= 2026 Ibero-American Championships in Athletics – Results =

These are the official results of the 2026 Ibero-American Championships in Athletics which took place on 29, 30 and 31 May 2026 at the Villa Deportiva Nacional in Lima, Peru.

== Men's results ==
=== 100 metres ===
Heats – 29 May
Wind:
Heat 1: +1.5 m/s, Heat 2: 0.0 m/s, Heat 3: +2.3 m/s, Heat 4: +1.6 m/s

Rank	Heat	Name	Nationality	Time	Notes
1	3	Eloy Benitez	Puerto Rico	10.19	Q
2	4	Franquelo Pérez	Dominican Republic	10.25	Q
3	3	Alexis Nieves	Venezuela	10.26	q
4	1	Lucas Villegas	Argentina	10.29	Q
5	3	Erik Cardoso	Brazil	10.30	q
6	1	Alejandro Ricketts	Costa Rica	10.33	q
7	4	Arturo Deliser	Panama	10.36	q
8	2	José González	Dominican Republic	10.37	Q
8	3	Carlos Palacios	Colombia	10.37	
8	3	Tomás Villegas	Argentina	10.37	
11	2	Neiker Abello	Colombia	10.39	
11	2	Jorge Vides	Brazil	10.39	
11	3	Gustavo Mongelós	Paraguay	10.39	
14	4	Bryant Alamo	Venezuela	10.43	
15	2	Adrián Canales	Puerto Rico	10.47	
16	2	Gabriel Maia	Portugal	10.48	
16	4	Adrián Nicolari	Uruguay	10.48	
18	2	Juan Pablo Nordetti	Chile	10.53	
19	2	Santiago Lazar	Uruguay	10.55	
20	1	Luis Humberto Angulo	Peru	10.67	
21	1	Juan Carlos Rodríguez	El Salvador	10.68	
22	2	Jonathan Wolk	Paraguay	10.71	
23	4	Yassir Cruz	Honduras	10.75	
24	3	Mariano Fiol	Peru	10.83	
25	4	José Andrés Salazar	El Salvador	11.04	

Final – 29 May

Wind: +1.8 m/s

Rank	Lane	Name	Nationality	Time	Notes
1st place, gold medalist(s)	4	Eloy Benitez	Puerto Rico	10.01	
2nd place, silver medalist(s)	5	Franquelo Pérez	Dominican Republic	10.17	
3rd place, bronze medalist(s)	6	José González	Dominican Republic	10.21	
4	7	Erik Cardoso	Brazil	10.23	
5	2	Alexis Nieves	Venezuela	10.23	
6	8	Arturo Deliser	Panama	10.25	
7	3	Lucas Villegas	Argentina	10.29	
8	1	Alejandro Ricketts	Costa Rica	10.40	

=== 200 metres ===
Heats – 30 May
Wind:
Heat 1: +3.5 m/s, Heat 2: -0.5 m/s, Heat 3: +0.3 m/s

Rank	Heat	Name	Nationality	Time	Notes
1	1	José Figueroa	Puerto Rico	20.00	Q
2	3	Alexis Nieves	Venezuela	20.39	Q, NR
3	1	José González	Dominican Republic	20.55	Q
4	3	Neiker Abello	Colombia	20.63	Q
5	2	Franquelo Pérez	Dominican Republic	20.65	Q
6	2	Katriel Angulo	Ecuador	20.56	Q
7	3	Lucas Vilar	Brazil	20.79	q
8	3	Arturo Deliser	Panama	20.81	q
9	2	Juan Ignacio Ciampitti	Argentina	20.82	q
10	2	Gabriel Maia	Portugal	20.89	
11	1	Stiven Méndez	Ecuador	20.97	
12	2	Paulo Henrique Pedroso	Brazil	21.01	
13	1	Deiner Guaitoto	Colombia	21.08	
14	3	Benjamín Aravena	Chile	21.16	
15	1	Santiago Lazar	Uruguay	21.18	
16	3	Juan Pedro Álvarez	Uruguay	21.41	
17	2	Tomás León	Chile	21.71	
	3	Alejandro Ricketts	Costa Rica	DNS	

Final – 31 May

Wind: +3.1 m/s

Rank	Lane	Name	Nationality	Time	Notes
1st place, gold medalist(s)	5	José Figueroa	Puerto Rico	20.21	
2nd place, silver medalist(s)	7	Alexis Nieves	Venezuela	20.47	
3rd place, bronze medalist(s)	6	José González	Dominican Republic	20.56	
4	8	Franquelo Pérez	Dominican Republic	20.72	
5	4	Neiker Abello	Colombia	20.74	
6	3	Katriel Angulo	Ecuador	20.81	
7	2	Arturo Deliser	Panama	21.11	
8	1	Juan Ignacio Ciampitti	Argentina	21.16	
	1	Lucas Vilar	Brazil	DNS	

=== 400 metres ===
Heats – 29 May

Rank	Heat	Name	Nationality	Time	Notes
1	1	Érick Sánchez	Dominican Republic	45.76	Q
2	1	Elián Larregina	Argentina	45.80	Q
3	2	Omar Elkhatib	Portugal	45.83	Q
4	1	Ericsson Tavares	Portugal	45.86	Q
5	1	Javier Gómez	Venezuela	46.12	q
6	2	Kelvis Padrino	Venezuela	46.18	Q
7	1	Jeffrey Cajo	Peru	46.36	q
8	2	Jhonatan Hoyos	Colombia	46.38	Q
9	2	Rafely Romero	Dominican Republic	46.66	
10	1	Vinícius Moura	Brazil	46.74	
10	2	Tiago da Silva	Brazil	46.74	
12	2	Alejandro Rosado	Puerto Rico	47.08	
13	2	Dusthin Morquecho	Ecuador	47.30	
14	1	Ian Andrey Pata	Ecuador	48.33	
15	2	Gary Altamirano	Costa Rica	48.46	
16	1	Edgar Acevedo	Colombia	48.48	

Final – 30 May

Rank	Lane	Name	Nationality	Time	Notes
1st place, gold medalist(s)	3	Omar Elkhatib	Portugal	45.47	
2nd place, silver medalist(s)	5	Elián Larregina	Argentina	45.57	
3rd place, bronze medalist(s)	6	Kelvis Padrino	Venezuela	45.61	
4	1	Javier Gómez	Venezuela	45.92	
5	4	Érick Sánchez	Dominican Republic	46.02	
6	2	Jhonatan Hoyos	Colombia	46.44	
7	7	Ericsson Tavares	Portugal	46.66	
8	8	Jeffrey Cajo	Peru	46.82	

=== 800 metres ===
Heats – 29 May

Rank	Heat	Name	Nationality	Time	Notes
1	2	David Barroso	Spain	1:45.93	Q
2	2	Guilherme Orenhas	Brazil	1:46.03	Q
3	1	Raynier Galvez	Dominican Republic	1:46.97	Q
4	2	Rafael Muñoz	Chile	1:47.15	Q
5	1	Eduardo Moreira	Brazil	1:47.22	Q
6	2	Ryan Ignaiker López	Venezuela	1:47.60	q
7	1	Ryan Sánchez	Puerto Rico	1:47.87	Q
8	1	Franco Peidon	Argentina	1:47.89	q
9	2	José Antonio Maita	Venezuela	1:48.23	
10	2	Ferdy Agramonte	Dominican Republic	1:48.24	
11	2	Adrián Mendoza	Colombia	1:48.48	
12	1	Marco Vilca	Peru	1:48.57	
13	1	Klaus Scholz	Chile	1:48.64	
14	1	Aarón Hernández	El Salvador	1:50.73	
15	2	Francisco Brenes	Costa Rica	1:50.89	
16	1	Ian Mas	Honduras	1:51.20	
17	2	Jeffrey Cajo	Peru	1:55.36	

Final – 31 May

Rank	Name	Nationality	Time	Notes
1st place, gold medalist(s)	David Barroso	Spain	1:46.30	
2nd place, silver medalist(s)	Eduardo Moreira	Brazil	1:46.56	
3rd place, bronze medalist(s)	Guilherme Orenhas	Brazil	1:46.82	
4	Rafael Muñoz	Chile	1:47.20	
5	Raynier Galvez	Dominican Republic	1:47.46	
6	Ryan Ignaiker López	Venezuela	1:49.29	
7	Franco Peidon	Argentina	1:49.38	
8	Ryan Sánchez	Puerto Rico	1:55.16	

=== 1500 metres ===
31 May

Rank	Name	Nationality	Time	Notes
1st place, gold medalist(s)	Valentín Soca	Uruguay	3:41.17	
2nd place, silver medalist(s)	Leonardo Santos	Brazil	3:41.50	
3rd place, bronze medalist(s)	Diego Lacamoire	Argentina	3:42.27	
4	Klaus Scholz	Chile	3:43.84	
5	Gerson Montes de Oca	Ecuador	3:44.07	
6	Guilherme Kurtz	Brazil	3:44.12	
7	Pablo Ñauta	Ecuador	3:46.78	NU20R
8	Gabriel Guzmán	Venezuela	3:48.86	
9	Dylan Carrasco	Colombia	3:49.56	
10	Aarón Hernández	El Salvador	3:51.92	
11	Ángel Rosado	Puerto Rico	3:52.51	
12	Luis Huaman	Peru	3:52.54	
13	Gonzalo Gervasini	Uruguay	3:52.63	
14	Carlos Vilches	Puerto Rico	4:00.38	
15	Ian Mas	Honduras	4:17.80	
	Sebastián López	Venezuela	DNF	
	Yeferson Cuno	Peru	DNS	

=== 5000 metres ===
31 May

Rank	Name	Nationality	Time	Notes
1st place, gold medalist(s)	Pedro Marín	Colombia	13:57.29	
2nd place, silver medalist(s)	Diego Uribe	Chile	13:59.36	
3rd place, bronze medalist(s)	Luis Masabanda	Ecuador	14:01.25	
4	Edwar Márquez	Peru	14:05.63	
5	Walace Caldas	Brazil	14:08.71	
6	Jhonatan Molina	Peru	14:16.61	
7	Vítor Ferreira	Brazil	14:18.97	
8	Paul Stafford	Puerto Rico	14:22.23	
9	Joaquín Campos	Chile	14:29.59	
10	Diego Arévalo	Ecuador	14:31.40	
11	David Ninavia	Bolivia	14:35.53	
12	Carlos San Martín	Colombia	14:39.91	
13	Martín Cuestas	Uruguay	15:02.55	
14	Brendan Fraser	Puerto Rico	15:06.40	
15	Gaspar Geymonat	Uruguay	15:14.10	
16	Manuel Rojas	Argentina	15:26.40	
	Gabriel Guzmán	Venezuela	DNF	
	Víctor Aguilar	Bolivia	DNF	

=== 10,000 metres ===
29 May

Rank	Name	Nationality	Time	Notes
1st place, gold medalist(s)	Valentín Soca	Uruguay	28:28.92	
2nd place, silver medalist(s)	Luis Masabanda	Ecuador	28:33.31	
3rd place, bronze medalist(s)	Carlos Díaz	Chile	28:36.98	
4	Fábio Correia	Brazil	29:30.44	
5	Yerson Orellana	Peru	29:32.46	
6	Arnaldo Martínez	Puerto Rico	29:59.28	
7	Víctor Aguilar	Bolivia	30:14.46	
8	Paul Stafford	Puerto Rico	30:15.70	
9	Gustavo dos Santos	Brazil	30:27.97	
10	Martín Cuestas	Uruguay	31:11.93	
11	Ariel Pavón	Honduras	33:41.92	
	Cristhian Pacheco	Peru	DQ	TR5

=== 110 metres hurdles ===
Heats – 30 May
Wind:
Heat 1: -0.1 m/s, Heat 2: +1.7 m/s

Rank	Heat	Name	Nationality	Time	Notes
1	1	Marcos Herrera	Ecuador	13.55	Q
2	1	Thiago Ornelas	Brazil	13.58	Q
3	2	Rafael Pereira	Brazil	13.64	Q
4	1	Cristián Rodríguez	Dominican Republic	13.80	Q
5	2	Daniel Cisneros	Spain	13.92	Q
6	2	Abdel Kader Larrinaga	Portugal	13.93	Q
7	1	Francisco Ferreccio	Argentina	14.09	q
8	1	Ángel Díaz	Spain	14.15	q
9	2	Esteban Josué Ibáñez	El Salvador	14.35	
10	1	Gabriel Mejía	Honduras	14.41	
11	2	Nahuel Laguna	Uruguay	14.87	NR
12	2	Renzo Cremaschi	Argentina	22.73	
	1	Edson Gomes	Portugal	DQ	RT 16.7.1
	2	Yohan Chaverra	Colombia	DNF	

Final – 31 May

Wind: +1.6 m/s

Rank	Lane	Name	Nationality	Time	Notes
1st place, gold medalist(s)	4	Marcos Herrera	Ecuador	13.43	NR
2nd place, silver medalist(s)	3	Rafael Pereira	Brazil	13.57	
3rd place, bronze medalist(s)	5	Thiago Ornelas	Brazil	13.64	
4	2	Cristián Rodríguez	Dominican Republic	13.70	
5	1	Ángel Díaz	Spain	13.85	
6	8	Francisco Ferreccio	Argentina	13.90	
7	6	Daniel Cisneros	Spain	14.52	
	7	Abdel Kader Larrinaga	Portugal	DNS	

=== 400 metres hurdles ===
Heats – 29 May

Rank	Heat	Name	Nationality	Time	Notes
1	2	Javier Lorente	Spain	50.24	Q
2	2	Pablo Andrés Ibáñez	El Salvador	50.32	Q
3	2	Bruno De Genaro	Argentina	50.37	Q
4	2	Stiven Méndez	Ecuador	50.61	q
5	2	Neider Abello	Colombia	51.45	q
6	1	Diego Courbis	Chile	51.58	Q
7	1	Vinícius Santos	Brazil	51.64	Q
8	1	Freddy Vásquez	Ecuador	52.52	Q
9	1	Jorge Acevedo	Dominican Republic	53.21	
10	1	Luis Eléspuru	Peru	53.30	

Final – 30 May

Rank	Lane	Name	Nationality	Time	Notes
1st place, gold medalist(s)	7	Bruno De Genaro	Argentina	49.92	
2nd place, silver medalist(s)	4	Javier Lorente	Spain	50.61	
3rd place, bronze medalist(s)	1	Stiven Méndez	Ecuador	50.71	
4	5	Pablo Andrés Ibáñez	El Salvador	50.74	
5	8	Neider Abello	Colombia	51.46	
6	6	Vinícius Santos	Brazil	51.57	
7	3	Diego Courbis	Chile	51.89	
8	2	Freddy Vásquez	Ecuador	53.47	

=== 3000 metres steeplechase ===
29 May

Rank	Name	Nationality	Time	Notes
1st place, gold medalist(s)	Walace Caldas	Brazil	8:42.69	
2nd place, silver medalist(s)	Gleison Santos	Brazil	8:50.67	
3rd place, bronze medalist(s)	Yeferson Cuno	Peru	8:57.23	
4	Yuri Labra	Peru	9:03.92	
5	Samuel Morales	Puerto Rico	9:08.65	
6	Julio Espinoza	Chile	9:12.78	
	Diego Caldeira	Venezuela	DNF	

=== 4 × 100 metres relay ===
31 May

Rank	Lane	Nation	Competitors	Time	Notes
1st place, gold medalist(s)	4	Puerto Rico	Eloy Benitez, José Figueroa, Adrian Canales, Yariel Pérez	38.84	
2nd place, silver medalist(s)	8	Dominican Republic	Christopher Melenciano, José González, Ángel Pierre, Rafely Romero	39.25	
3rd place, bronze medalist(s)	2	Argentina	Lucas Villegas, Juan Ignacio Ciampitti, Daniel Londero, Tomás Villegas	39.34	
4	6	Venezuela	Eubrig Maza, Alexis Nieves, Carlos Belisario, Bryant Álamo	39.37	
5	5	Chile	Ignacio Nordetti, Benjamín Aravena, Juan Pablo Nordetti, Tomás León	40.00	
6	7	Peru	Jeffrey Cajo, Mariano Fiol, Aron Earl, Luis Humberto Angulo	40.83	
	3	Colombia	Deiner Guaitoto, Carlos Palacios, Neiker Abello, Luis Hernández	DNF	

=== 4 × 400 metres relay ===
31 May

Rank	Heat	Nation	Competitors	Time	Notes
1st place, gold medalist(s)	2	Venezuela	Javier Gómez, Carlos Zambrano, Axel Gómez, Kelvis Padrino	3:02.88	
2nd place, silver medalist(s)	2	Puerto Rico	José Figueroa, Jarell Cruz, Yariel Pérez, Alejandro Rosado	3:03.19	
3rd place, bronze medalist(s)	2	Dominican Republic	Érick Sánchez, Christopher Melenciano, Ferdy Agramonte, Rafely Romero	3:03.45	
4	2	Brazil	Vinícius Moura, Tiago da Silva, Guilherme Orenhas, Eduardo Moreira	3:03.73	
5	1	Argentina	Agustín Pinti, Bruno De Genaro, Manuel Robles, Elián Larregina	3:08.34	
6	2	Colombia	Neider Abello, Adrián Mendoza, Edgar Acevedo, Jhonatan Hoyos	3:10.17	
7	1	Chile	Diego Courbis, Martín Zabala, Francisco Muñoz, Pablo Cárdenas	3:11.61	
8	1	Ecuador	Ian Andrey Pata, Stiven Méndez, Freddy Vásquez, Dusthin Morquecho	3:11.62	
9	1	Peru	Marco Vilca, Jeffrey Cajo, César Chávez, Luis Eléspuru	3:13.71	

=== 10,000 metres walk ===
30 May

Rank	Name	Nationality	Time	Notes
1st place, gold medalist(s)	Saúl Wamputsrik	Ecuador	40:01.15	
2nd place, silver medalist(s)	Max dos Santos	Brazil	40:07.06	
3rd place, bronze medalist(s)	Matheus Corrêa	Brazil	40:15.90	
4	José Duvan Ccoscco	Peru	40:57.04	
5	Juan Manuel Cano	Argentina	43:27.95	
	Luis Henry Campos	Peru	DQ	TR54.7.1
	Éider Arévalo	Colombia	DNS	

=== High jump ===
30 May

Rank	Name	Nationality	1.90	1.95	2.00	2.05	2.10	2.13	2.16	2.19	2.22	Result	Notes
1st place, gold medalist(s)	Thiago Moura	Brazil	–	–	–	o	xo	–	o	o	xxx	2.19	
2nd place, silver medalist(s)	Nicolás Numair	Chile	–	–	–	o	–	o	xxo	x–	xx	2.16	
3rd place, bronze medalist(s)	Pablo Martínez	Spain	–	o	–	xo	o	xo	xxx			2.13	
4	Fernando Ferreira	Brazil	–	–	–	o	o	x–	xx			2.10	
4	Marcus Gelpi	Puerto Rico	–	–	o	o	o	xxx				2.10	
4	Santiago Barberia	Argentina	–	o	o	o	o	xxx				2.10	
7	Luis Castro	Puerto Rico	–	–	o	o	x–	xx				2.05	
8	Juan Ignacio Acosta	Dominican Republic	–	–	o	–	xxx					2.00	
9	Deyvid Lara	Ecuador	–	o	xo	xxx						2.00	
10	Sebastián Daners	Uruguay	o	o	xxx							1.95	

=== Pole vault ===
30 May

Rank	Name	Nationality	4.60	4.75	4.90	5.00	5.10	5.20	5.25	5.30	5.40	5.45	5.51	5.61	Result	Notes
1st place, gold medalist(s)	Isidro Leyva	Spain	–	–	–	o	–	xo	–	xo	o	–	xx–	x	5.40	
2nd place, silver medalist(s)	Alex Gracia	Spain	–	–	–	o	–	o	–	o	x–	xx			5.30	
3rd place, bronze medalist(s)	Guillermo Correa	Chile	–	–	–	xo	–	o	–	xxx					5.20	
4	Dyander Pacho	Ecuador	–	–	o	xxo	o	xxx							5.10	
5	Lucas Pedro Vicente	Brazil	–	o	o	–	xo	–	xxx						5.10	
	Daniel Machado	El Salvador	xxx												NM	
	Augusto Dutra de Oliveira	Brazil													DQ	TR7.1

=== Long jump ===
30 May

Rank	Name	Nationality	#1	#2	#3	#4	#5	#6	Result	Notes
1st place, gold medalist(s)	Arnovis Dalmero	Colombia	7.58	7.74	7.75	7.74	7.79	7.97w	7.97w	
2nd place, silver medalist(s)	Carlos Beltrán	Spain	7.49	7.87	7.84	7.88	x	7.91	7.91	
3rd place, bronze medalist(s)	Emiliano Lasa	Uruguay	7.80	7.88	7.83	x	–	–	7.88	
4	Michael Williams	Puerto Rico	7.79	7.34	7.74	x	7.60	x	7.79	
5	Santiago Cova	Venezuela	7.43	7.61	7.38	x	7.67	x	7.67	
6	Alexsandro Melo	Brazil	x	7.54	x	7.44w	x	7.55	7.55	
7	Martín Saavedra	Argentina	7.36	x	6.23	7.29	7.20	7.35	7.36	
8	Breno de Carvalho	Brazil	x	7.20	x	–	–	–	7.20	
9	Ángel Daniel Solís	Peru	6.56	6.74	6.82				6.82	
	José Luis Mandros	Peru							DNS	

=== Triple jump ===
29 May

Rank	Name	Nationality	#1	#2	#3	#4	#5	#6	Result	Notes
1st place, gold medalist(s)	Elton Petronilho	Brazil	16.01	16.61w	16.58w	16.38w	16.65	x	16.65	
2nd place, silver medalist(s)	Felipe Izidoro	Brazil	x	x	16.20w	15.49	x	15.23w	16.20w	
3rd place, bronze medalist(s)	Tiago Costa	Portugal	x	x	15.60w	15.53	x	15.81w	15.81w	
4	Jason Castro	Honduras	x	x	x	15.43	x	15.29w	15.43	
5	Fernando Reyes	El Salvador	15.14	15.17	14.83	14.52w	x	14.84	15.17	
6	Thiago Pereira	Portugal	x	14.98	x	15.07	x	14.90w	15.07	
7	Deyvid Lara	Ecuador	x	x	x	x	14.66	14.45w	14.66	
8	Nazareno Melgarejo	Argentina	14.35	13.21	x	x	–	r	14.35	

=== Shot put ===
31 May

Rank	Name	Nationality	#1	#2	#3	#4	#5	#6	Result	Notes
1st place, gold medalist(s)	Willian Dourado	Brazil	20.01	20.07	x	19.83	x	19.97	20.07	
2nd place, silver medalist(s)	Matías Puschel	Chile	x	16.65	17.04	17.78	17.35	x	17.78	
3rd place, bronze medalist(s)	Alan Cabanellas	Puerto Rico	x	16.05	15.81	x	x	17.61	17.61	
4	Luis Humberto Fossa	Peru	16.25	15.66	x	16.87	16.02	16.90	16.90	
	Claudio Romero	Chile							DNS	

=== Discus throw ===
30 May

Rank	Name	Nationality	#1	#2	#3	#4	#5	#6	Result	Notes
1st place, gold medalist(s)	Claudio Romero	Chile	61.92	65.93	x	64.73	64.48	x	65.93	CR
2nd place, silver medalist(s)	Emanuel Sousa	Portugal	59.77	63.60	x	61.97	x	x	63.60	
3rd place, bronze medalist(s)	Juan José Caicedo	Ecuador	63.43	x	62.71	x	x	61.10	63.43	
4	Lucas Nervi	Chile	58.31	x	x	61.90	x	59.37	61.90	
5	Wellinton da Cruz Filho	Brazil	59.50	61.83	59.27	58.42	x	x	61.83	
6	Douglas dos Reis	Brazil	x	60.42	58.04	x	61.39	x	61.39	
7	Edujose Lima	Portugal	52.61	55.15	x	55.78	56.81	55.76	56.81	
8	Winston Campbell	Honduras	x	x	52.47	52.39	x	52.40	52.47	
9	Luis Humberto Fossa	Peru	x	50.09	51.48				51.48	

=== Hammer throw ===
29 May

Rank	Name	Nationality	#1	#2	#3	#4	#5	#6	Result	Notes
1st place, gold medalist(s)	Humberto Mansilla	Chile	70.96	74.46	74.14	74.70	x	70.70	74.70	
2nd place, silver medalist(s)	Joaquín Gómez	Argentina	67.95	71.71	71.65	x	74.05	73.04	74.05	
3rd place, bronze medalist(s)	Gabriel Kehr	Chile	70.58	x	x	x	74.03	72.86	74.03	
4	Jerome Vega	Puerto Rico	x	71.52	x	70.99	71.71	70.68	71.71	
5	Alencar Pereira	Brazil	66.73	66.33	70.80	x	71.02	70.04	71.02	
6	Décio Andrade	Portugal	66.19	69.27	x	x	67.72	68.37	69.27	
7	Michael Soler	Puerto Rico	x	67.42	68.63	67.04	x	68.70	68.70	
8	Allan Wolski	Brazil	64.34	x	66.71	x	67.31	66.92	67.31	
9	Lautaro Vouilloz	Argentina	64.99	x	x				64.99	

=== Javelin throw ===
31 May

Rank	Name	Nationality	#1	#2	#3	#4	#5	#6	Result	Notes
1st place, gold medalist(s)	Pedro Henrique Rodrigues	Brazil	81.37	x	78.47	x	x	x	81.37	
2nd place, silver medalist(s)	Leandro Ramos	Portugal	78.90	79.51	79.58	78.41	x	79.49	79.58	
3rd place, bronze medalist(s)	Manu Quijera	Spain	70.98	75.16	77.09	x	77.67	x	77.67	
4	Iván Sibaja	Costa Rica	73.57	72.10	77.04	x	x	x	77.04	NR
5	Billy Julio	Colombia	67.51	69.12	x	66.36	73.39	74.66	74.66	
6	Lautaro Techera	Uruguay	62.13	66.12	64.54	62.12	67.42	67.90	67.90	
7	Thiago Santos	Brazil	63.39	61.15	64.81	57.53	60.69	59.21	64.81	

=== Decathlon ===
29–30 May

The highest mark recorded in each event is highlighted in yellow

Rank	Athlete	Nationality	100m	LJ	SP	HJ	400m	110m H	DT	PV	JT	1500m	Points	Notes
1st place, gold medalist(s)	Felipe dos Santos	Brazil	10.91	7.25	13.75	1.96	51.38	14.42	44.90	4.80	55.64	5:12.44	7684	
2nd place, silver medalist(s)	Lucas Catanhede	Brazil	11.32	6.94	11.49	1.84	50.11	14.86	36.34	4.00	53.97	4:41.27	7031	
3rd place, bronze medalist(s)	Carlos Córdoba	Venezuela	11.41	7.04	12.51	1.90	50.52	15.95	42.13	NM	59.50	4:49.95	6531	

== Women's results ==
=== 100 metres ===
Heats – 29 May
Wind:
Heat 1: +1.7 m/s, Heat 2: +1.0 m/s, Heat 3: +0.9 m/s

Rank	Heat	Name	Nationality	Time	Notes
1	3	Ana Carolina Azevedo	Brazil	11.11	Q
2	3	Liranyi Alonso	Dominican Republic	11.22	Q
3	1	Frances Colón	Puerto Rico	11.26	Q
4	2	María Maturana	Colombia	11.30	Q
5	3	Aimara Nazareno	Ecuador	11.31	q
6	1	Marlet Ospino	Colombia	11.32	Q
7	2	Gladymar Torres	Puerto Rico	11.38	Q
8	1	Gabriela Mourão	Brazil	11.39	q
9	2	Ángela Tenorio	Ecuador	11.41	
10	1	Glanyernis Guerra	Venezuela	11.47	
11	2	Patricia Sine	Dominican Republic	11.48	NU18R
12	3	Beatriz Castelhano	Portugal	11.54	
13	1	Paula Daruich	Peru	11.60	NR
14	2	Rosalina Santos	Portugal	11.70	
15	3	Rori Lowe	Honduras	11.78	
16	2	Xenia Hiebert	Paraguay	11.90	
17	2	Aracely Pretell	Peru	11.92	
18	1	Macarena Giménez	Paraguay	11.99	
19	3	Shantely Scott	El Salvador	12.53	

Final – 29 May

Wind: +0.7 m/s

Rank	Lane	Name	Nationality	Time	Notes
1st place, gold medalist(s)	5	Ana Carolina Azevedo	Brazil	11.08	CR
2nd place, silver medalist(s)	6	María Maturana	Colombia	11.17	NR
3rd place, bronze medalist(s)	4	Liranyi Alonso	Dominican Republic	11.19	
4	1	Aimara Nazareno	Ecuador	11.22	
5	7	Marlet Ospino	Colombia	11.31 (11.304)	
6	2	Gladymar Torres	Puerto Rico	11.31 (11.305)	
7	3	Frances Colón	Puerto Rico	11.31 (11.306)	
8	8	Gabriela Mourão	Brazil	11.37	

=== 200 metres ===
Heats – 30 May
Wind:
Heat 1: +3.0 m/s, Heat 2: +0.2 m/s, Heat 3: +0.3 m/s

Rank	Heat	Name	Nationality	Time	Notes
1	1	Marlet Ospino	Colombia	22.72	Q
2	1	Estrella de Aza	Dominican Republic	22.84	Q
3	3	Ana Carolina Azevedo	Brazil	22.89	Q
4	1	Alba Borrero	Spain	22.95	q
5	2	Anahí Suárez	Ecuador	23.17	Q
6	3	María Maturana	Colombia	23.48	Q
7	1	Catarina Lourenço	Portugal	23.55	q
8	3	Cristal Cuervo	Panama	23.85	
9	2	Darianny Jiménez	Dominican Republic	23.88	Q
10	3	Cristal Cuervo	Puerto Rico	23.94	
11	1	Paula Daruich	Peru	24.11	
12	2	Rosalina Santos	Portugal	24.30	
13	3	Rori Lowe	Honduras	24.57	
14	2	Cayetana Chirinos	Peru	24.97	
	2	Nicole Chala	Ecuador	DNF	
	2	Gabriela Mourão	Brazil	DNF	
	1	Ángela Tenorio	Ecuador	DNS	

Final – 31 May

Wind: +3.4 m/s

Rank	Lane	Name	Nationality	Time	Notes
1st place, gold medalist(s)	7	Ana Carolina Azevedo	Brazil	22.50	
2nd place, silver medalist(s)	6	Marlet Ospino	Colombia	22.83	
3rd place, bronze medalist(s)	5	Estrella de Aza	Dominican Republic	22.95	
4	3	Alba Borrero	Spain	22.98	
5	8	María Maturana	Colombia	23.00	
6	4	Anahí Suárez	Ecuador	23.03	
7	1	Catarina Lourenço	Portugal	23.74	
8	2	Darianny Jiménez	Dominican Republic	23.78	

=== 400 metres ===
Heats – 29 May

Rank	Heat	Name	Nationality	Time	Notes
1	1	Gabby Scott	Puerto Rico	52.05	Q
2	1	Lina Licona	Colombia	52.28	Q
3	1	María Florencia Lamboglia	Argentina	52.69	Q
4	2	Anabel Medina	Dominican Republic	53.02	Q
5	2	Andrea Rivera	Puerto Rico	53.06	Q
6	2	Melany Bolaño	Colombia	53.22	Q
7	1	Milagros Durán	Dominican Republic	53.63	q
8	1	Génesis Cañola	Ecuador	54.17	q
9	1	Anny de Bassi	Brazil	54.54	
10	2	Júlia Ribeiro	Brazil	54.63	
11	2	Desiré Bermúdez	Costa Rica	56.38	

Final – 30 May

Rank	Lane	Name	Nationality	Time	Notes
1st place, gold medalist(s)	4	Anabel Medina	Dominican Republic	51.38	
2nd place, silver medalist(s)	3	Lina Licona	Colombia	51.42	
3rd place, bronze medalist(s)	5	Gabby Scott	Puerto Rico	51.70	
4	6	Andrea Rivera	Puerto Rico	52.77	
5	7	María Florencia Lamboglia	Argentina	53.55	
6	1	Milagros Durán	Dominican Republic	53.60	
7	2	Melany Bolaño	Colombia	54.06	
8	8	Génesis Cañola	Ecuador	54.52	

=== 800 metres ===
31 May

Rank	Name	Nationality	Time	Notes
1st place, gold medalist(s)	Déborah Rodríguez	Uruguay	2:03.39	
2nd place, silver medalist(s)	Mayara Leite	Brazil	2:04.11	
3rd place, bronze medalist(s)	Berdine Castillo	Chile	2:04.57	
4	Valentina Barrientos	Chile	2:05.77	
5	Sabrina Gabrieli	Brazil	2:05.80	
6	Victoria Olives	Argentina	2:09.18	

=== 1500 metres ===
30 May

Rank	Name	Nationality	Time	Notes
1st place, gold medalist(s)	Micaela Levaggi	Argentina	4:28.35	
2nd place, silver medalist(s)	Javiera Faletto	Chile	4:29.74	
3rd place, bronze medalist(s)	July da Silva	Brazil	4:29.94	
4	Jaqueline Weber	Brazil	4:30.00	
5	Benita Parra	Bolivia	4:33.56	
	María Pía Fernández	Uruguay	DNF	
	Veronica Huacasi	Peru	DNS	
	Natalie Bitetti	El Salvador	DNS	

=== 5000 metres ===
31 May

Rank	Name	Nationality	Time	Notes
1st place, gold medalist(s)	Micaela Levaggi	Argentina	15:48.90	
2nd place, silver medalist(s)	Veronica Huacasi	Peru	15:54.14	
3rd place, bronze medalist(s)	Benita Parra	Bolivia	16:05.64	NR
4	Mary Granja	Ecuador	16:08.22	
5	Carmen Toaquinza	Ecuador	16:16.04	
6	Maria Lucineida da Silva	Brazil	16:39.91	
7	Javiera Faletto	Chile	16:42.19	
8	Amanda de Oliveira	Brazil	16:48.25	
9	Paola Figueroa	Puerto Rico	16:54.44	
10	Katherine Cardozo	Uruguay	17:18.50	
	Laura Taborda	Portugal	DNF	
	Natalie Bitetti	El Salvador	DNS	
	Luz Mery Rojas	Peru	DNS	

=== 10,000 metres ===
29 May

Rank	Name	Nationality	Time	Notes
1st place, gold medalist(s)	Beatriz Álvarez	Spain	33:45.53	
2nd place, silver medalist(s)	Mary Granja	Ecuador	33:49.19	
3rd place, bronze medalist(s)	Nélida Peñaflor	Argentina	33:59.48	
4	Silvia Ortiz	Ecuador	34:02.11	
5	Gladys Tejeda	Peru	34:03.18	
6	Paola Figueroa	Puerto Rico	34:34.26	
7	Maria Lucineida da Silva	Brazil	34:45.06	
8	Amanda de Oliveira	Brazil	34:59.05	
	Leidy Lozano	Colombia	DNF	
	Luz Mery Rojas	Peru	DQ	TR5

=== 100 metres hurdles ===
Heats – 30 May
Wind:
Heat 1: +2.6 m/s, Heat 2: +1.1 m/s

Rank	Heat	Name	Nationality	Time	Notes
1	2	Vitoria Alves	Brazil	12.68	Q, CR, NR
2	2	Paola Vázquez	Puerto Rico	12.87	Q
3	1	Ketiley Batista	Brazil	13.25	Q
4	2	Melissa Sereno	Portugal	13.56	Q
5	1	Nathalie Almendarez	El Salvador	13.59	Q
6	1	Yesi Tejada	Dominican Republic	13.69	Q
7	1	Domenica Crose	Peru	13.69	q
8	2	Nancy Sandoval	El Salvador	13.99	q
	1	Catalina Rozas	Chile	DQ	TR22.6.2

Final – 31 May

Wind: +3.5 m/s

Rank	Lane	Name	Nationality	Time	Notes
1st place, gold medalist(s)	4	Vitoria Alves	Brazil	12.68	
2nd place, silver medalist(s)	6	Paola Vázquez	Puerto Rico	12.84	
3rd place, bronze medalist(s)	5	Ketiley Batista	Brazil	13.21	
4	7	Yesi Tejada	Dominican Republic	13.49	
5	2	Melissa Sereno	Portugal	13.73	
6	8	Nancy Sandoval	El Salvador	13.74	
7	3	Nathalie Almendarez	El Salvador	14.18	
8	1	Domenica Crose	Peru	14.32	

=== 400 metres hurdles ===
30 May

Rank	Lane	Name	Nationality	Time	Notes
1st place, gold medalist(s)	4	Grace Claxton	Puerto Rico	55.74	
2nd place, silver medalist(s)	5	Rita Ferreira	Brazil	56.16	
3rd place, bronze medalist(s)	6	Daniela Rojas	Costa Rica	56.50	
4	3	María Alejandra Rocha	Colombia	56.92	
5	7	Evelyn del Carmen	Dominican Republic	57.61	
6	2	Chayenne da Silva	Brazil	59.34	
	1	Anabel Medina	Dominican Republic	DNF	
	8	Ana Isabella González	El Salvador	DNF	

=== 3000 metres steeplechase ===
30 May

Rank	Name	Nationality	Time	Notes
1st place, gold medalist(s)	Belén Casetta	Argentina	9:39.75	
2nd place, silver medalist(s)	Tatiane Raquel da Silva	Brazil	9:43.12	
3rd place, bronze medalist(s)	Laura Taborda	Portugal	9:43.82	
4	Simone Ferraz	Brazil	10:26.70	
5	Luz Lizandra Arias	Peru	10:31.39	
6	Leydi Carmen Raura	Ecuador	10:41.00	

=== 4 × 100 metres relay ===
31 May

Rank	Lane	Nation	Competitors	Time	Notes
1st place, gold medalist(s)	6	Puerto Rico	Adanelys Rodríguez, Gladymar Torres, Legna Echevarría, Frances Colón	43.78	
2nd place, silver medalist(s)	4	Argentina	Guillermina Cossio, Noelia Martínez, María Florencia Lamboglia, Milagros D'Amico	45.02	
3rd place, bronze medalist(s)	7	Peru	Aracely Pretell, Cayetana Chirinos, Catalina Yzaga, Paula Daruich	45.88	
	5	Dominican Republic	Patricia Sine, Fiordaliza Cofil, Martha Méndez, Liranyi Alonso	DNF	

=== 4 × 400 metres relay ===
31 May

Rank	Lane	Nation	Competitors	Time	Notes
1st place, gold medalist(s)	3	Dominican Republic	Bianca Acosta, Anabel Medina, Milagros Durán, Fiordaliza Cofil	3:30.02	
2nd place, silver medalist(s)	6	Colombia	Melany Bolaño, Lina Licona, María Alejandra Rocha, Sofía Molina	3:30.44	
3rd place, bronze medalist(s)	7	Puerto Rico	Andrea Rivera, Grace Claxton, Sarai Javier, Gabby Scott	3:30.80	NR
4	5	Brazil	Anny de Bassi, Jainy dos Santos, Júlia Ribeiro, Rita Ferreira	3:32.69	
5	4	Peru	Catalina Yzaga, Estefania Papi, Laura Vila, Kiara Mujica	3:52.46	

=== 10,000 metres walk ===
30 May

Rank	Name	Nationality	Time	Notes
1st place, gold medalist(s)	Kimberly García	Peru	42:45.06	WL, NR
2nd place, silver medalist(s)	Mary Luz Andía	Peru	44:34.60	
3rd place, bronze medalist(s)	Lidia Sánchez-Puebla	Spain	45:16.52	
4	Lucía Redondo	Spain	45:45.43	
5	Ángela Castro	Bolivia	46:39.35	
6	Gabriela Muniz	Brazil	46:52.76	

=== High jump ===
31 May

Rank	Name	Nationality	1.60	1.65	1.70	1.73	1.76	1.79	1.82	1.84	1.86	1.88	1.90	1.92	Result	Notes
1st place, gold medalist(s)	Marysabel Senyu	Dominican Republic	–	–	–	o	–	o	o	o	o	o	o	xxx	1.90	
2nd place, silver medalist(s)	Una Stancev	Spain	–	–	o	–	o	o	xo	o	o	o	o	xxx	1.90	
3rd place, bronze medalist(s)	Maria Eduarda de Oliveira	Brazil	–	o	o	o	xxo	xxx							1.76	
4	Abigail Obando	Costa Rica	o	o	o	xxo	xxo	xxx							1.76	
5	Lorena Aires	Uruguay	–	o	o	xxo	xxx								1.73	
6	Valdiléia Martins	Brazil	–	o	xxx										1.65	
	Ana Isabela González	El Salvador													DNS	

=== Pole vault ===
29 May

Rank	Name	Nationality	3.45	3.60	3.75	3.85	3.95	4.05	4.10	4.15	4.20	4.25	Result	Notes
1st place, gold medalist(s)	Naiara Pérez	Spain	–	–	xo	–	o	o	–	x–	o	xxx	4.20	
2nd place, silver medalist(s)	Beatriz Chagas	Brazil	–	–	–	o	–	o	–	o	–	xxx	4.15	
3rd place, bronze medalist(s)	Carolina Scarponi	Argentina	–	o	o	o	o	xo	xxx				4.05	
4	Ayla Silva	Brazil	–	xo	o	o	o	xxx					3.95	
5	Andrea Velasco	El Salvador	o	xxx									3.45	
	Arantxa Cortéz	Peru	–	–	–	xxx							NM	

=== Long jump ===
31 May

Rank	Name	Nationality	#1	#2	#3	#4	#5	#6	Result	Notes
1st place, gold medalist(s)	Natalia Linares	Colombia	x	6.67w	6.64w	–	–	–	6.67w	
2nd place, silver medalist(s)	Paola Fernández	Puerto Rico	6.56w	6.66w	x	6.55	6.60	x	6.66	
3rd place, bronze medalist(s)	Leticia Oro Melo	Brazil	6.23w	6.33w	6.37w	x	6.48w	6.43w	6.48w	
4	Evelina Minaya	Dominican Republic	6.43	x	x	6.34w	x	x	6.43	
5	Thelma Fuentes	Guatemala	x	x	5.51w	5.87w	5.89	5.70w	5.89	
6	Legna Echevarría	Puerto Rico	5.72w	x	x	r			5.72w	
7	Domenica Crose	Peru	–	x	5.38w	5.40w	5.40w	5.62w	5.62w	

=== Triple jump ===
29 May

Rank	Name	Nationality	#1	#2	#3	#4	#5	#6	Result	Notes
1st place, gold medalist(s)	Gabriele dos Santos	Brazil	14.06	12.52	13.61	x	13.95	x	14.06	
2nd place, silver medalist(s)	Regiclecia da Silva	Brazil	13.47w	13.34	x	13.05	x	x	13.47w	
3rd place, bronze medalist(s)	Thelma Fuentes	Guatemala	x	13.17	x	12.83	13.01w	x	13.17	
4	Genesis Pire	Venezuela	12.91	x	12.84	x	x	x	12.91	
5	Kiara Mujica	Peru	x	12.39w	12.38	11.81	12.57	x	12.57	
6	Millie Díaz	Uruguay	12.31	x	x	12.28	12.08w	12.33	12.33	

=== Shot put ===
30 May

Rank	Name	Nationality	#1	#2	#3	#4	#5	#6	Result	Notes
1st place, gold medalist(s)	Ana Caroline Silva	Brazil	17.20	17.72	17.48	17.36	16.55	16.55	17.72	
2nd place, silver medalist(s)	Belsy Quiñónez	Ecuador	17.44	17.08	17.63	16.74	16.90	16.37	17.63	NR, NU20R
3rd place, bronze medalist(s)	María Belén Toimil	Spain	15.82	16.40	x	17.22	17.06	17.57	17.57	
4	Rosa Ramírez	Dominican Republic	16.52	x	16.52	15.86	16.90	16.73	16.90	
5	Ivana Gallardo	Chile	x	16.15	x	16.61	x	x	16.61	
6	Maria Fernanda de Aviz	Brazil	x	16.43	16.35	15.86	16.53	16.18	16.53	
7	Elianys Sutil	Venezuela	12.38	13.09	12.68	x	13.28	12.68	13.28	
	Prizila Negrete	Honduras							DNS	

=== Discus throw ===
31 May

Rank	Name	Nationality	#1	#2	#3	#4	#5	#6	Result	Notes
1st place, gold medalist(s)	Andressa de Morais	Brazil	59.68	x	x	x	x	57.45	59.68	
2nd place, silver medalist(s)	Ottaynis Febres	Venezuela	49.76	x	54.74	x	x	x	54.74	
3rd place, bronze medalist(s)	Isabella Mosquera	Colombia	43.62	50.35	49.29	x	48.90	46.03	50.35	
4	Samanta Lopes	Brazil	45.49	x	x	x	46.86	x	46.86	
5	Elianys Sutil	Venezuela	x	x	x	40.95	40.68	41.58	41.58	
	Prizila Negrete	Honduras							DNS	

=== Hammer throw ===
29 May

Rank	Name	Nationality	#1	#2	#3	#4	#5	#6	Result	Notes
1st place, gold medalist(s)	Ximena Zorrilla	Peru	x	66.32	x	65.91	65.21	65.13	66.32	
2nd place, silver medalist(s)	Mayra Gaviria	Colombia	64.66	64.62	65.21	61.65	66.20	65.10	66.20	
3rd place, bronze medalist(s)	Mariana García	Chile	60.69	62.66	62.19	61.56	64.39	60.77	64.39	
4	Mariana Pestana	Portugal	62.58	x	62.92	x	58.10	x	62.92	
5	Yarielis Torres	Puerto Rico	61.29	59.77	x	55.76	62.74	x	62.74	
6	Ana Lays Bayer	Brazil	60.92	x	x	x	62.07	61.27	62.07	
7	Agnys Ribeiro	Brazil	x	59.63	x	x	x	54.99	59.63	
8	Juliana Baigorria	Argentina	58.54	x	57.03	56.17	x	56.53	58.54	
	Gabrielle Figueroa	Honduras	x	x	r				NM	
	Yenniver Veroes	Venezuela							DNS	

=== Javelin throw ===
29 May

Rank	Name	Nationality	#1	#2	#3	#4	#5	#6	Result	Notes
1st place, gold medalist(s)	Jucilene de Lima	Brazil	50.66	60.75	60.93	x	x	59.74	60.93	
2nd place, silver medalist(s)	Daniella Nisimura	Brazil	x	54.00	56.69	56.15	58.99	55.49	58.99	
3rd place, bronze medalist(s)	Arianne Duarte Morais	Cape Verde	50.44	51.07	x	50.91	49.92	54.58	54.58	
4	María Lucelly Murillo	Colombia	50.93	x	53.96	x	51.25	x	53.96	
5	Yesi Tejada	Dominican Republic	43.97	47.28	46.14	47.18	46.31	43.99	47.28	
6	Kimberly Flores	Peru	43.45	44.99	45.17	44.48	43.59	x	45.17	
7	Hashly Ayovi	Ecuador	x	x	37.34	43.39	43.68	40.69	43.68	
	Esther Padilla	Honduras							DNS	

=== Heptathlon ===
29–30 May

The highest mark recorded in each event is highlighted in yellow

Rank	Athlete	Nationality	100m H	HJ	SP	200m	LJ	JT	800m	Points	Notes
1st place, gold medalist(s)	Jéssica Barreira	Portugal	13.44	1.59	14.68	24.25	6.31	49.86	2:26.02	6126	
2nd place, silver medalist(s)	Roberta dos Santos	Brazil	14.80	1.83	13.69	26.11	6.14	34.83	2:27.16	5635	
3rd place, bronze medalist(s)	Raiane Procopio	Brazil	14.47	1.68	13.08	25.69	5.87w	42.92	2:27.01	5564	
4	Fabiola Declet	Puerto Rico	14.12	1.56	11.78	24.40	5.80	36.25	2:23.92	5396	
5	Mariangelic Rojas	Venezuela	13.95	1.59	11.52	24.51	5.80	31.85	2:29.50	5270	
6	Marienger Chirinos	Venezuela	14.65	1.68	10.59	25.16	5.56	34.79	2:28.08	5160	
7	Abigail Obando	Costa Rica	14.85	1.71	10.05	24.56	5.14	30.63	2:24.56	5040	

== Mixed results ==
=== 4 × 100 metres relay ===
30 May

Rank	Heat	Nation	Competitors	Time	Notes
1st place, gold medalist(s)	2	Brazil	Erik Cardoso, Gabriela Mourão, Jorge Vides, Ana Carolina Azevedo	40.99	AR
2nd place, silver medalist(s)	2	Argentina	Lucas Villegas, Milagros D'Amico, Tomás Villegas, Guillermina Cossio	41.76	
3rd place, bronze medalist(s)	1	Venezuela	Brayan Alamo, Orangys Jimenez, Alexis Nieves, Glanyernis Guerra	41.95	
4	2	Puerto Rico	Eloy Benitez, Gladymar Torres, Adrián Canales, Frances Colón	42.08	
5	1	Paraguay	Jonathan Wolk, Macarena Giménez, Gustavo Móngelos, Xenia Hierbert	42.85	
6	1	El Salvador	Juan Carlos Rodríguez, Nathalie Almendarez, José Andrés Salazar, Shantely Scott	45.00	
	1	Peru	Luis Humberto Angulo, Cayetana Chirinos, Mariano Fiol, Paula Daruich	DNF	
	2	Dominican Republic	Franquelo Pérez, Liranyi Alonso, José González, Estrella de Aza	DQ	RT24.7
	2	Ecuador	Katriel Angulo, Anahí Suárez, Ian Andrey Pata, Aimara Nazareno	DQ	RT24.7

=== 4 × 400 metres relay ===
29 May

Rank	Lane	Nation	Competitors	Time	Notes
1st place, gold medalist(s)	5	Dominican Republic	Érick Sánchez, Estrella de Aza, Christopher Melenciano, Fiordaliza Cofil	3:15.96	CR
2nd place, silver medalist(s)	3	Colombia	Jhonatan Hoyos, Melany Bolaño, Edgar Acevedo, Lina Licona	3:17.83	
3rd place, bronze medalist(s)	4	Puerto Rico	Jarell Cruz, Andrea Rivera, Yariel Pérez, Sarai Javier	3:17.90	NR
4	7	Brazil	Vinícius Moura, Jainy dos Santos, Tiago da Silva, Júlia Ribeiro	3:20.32	
5	6	Argentina	Agustín Pinti, Guillermina Cossio, Manuel Robles, Noelia Martínez	3:20.94	NR
