= 2026 Ibero-American Championships in Athletics =

XXI Ibero-American Championships in Athletics
- Dates: May 29–31
- Host city: Lima, Peru
- Venue: Villa Deportiva Nacional
- Level: Senior
- Events: 46 (22 men, 22 women, 2 mixed)
- Participation: 381 athletes from 20 nations

The 21st Ibero-American Championships in Athletics were held at the Centro de Treinamento Olímpico in Lima, Peru, between May 29 and 31, 2026.

== Medal summary ==
=== Men ===
Event	Gold		Silver		Bronze	
100 metres (wind: +1.8 m/s)	Eloy Benitez; Puerto Rico	10.01	Franquelo Pérez; Dominican Republic	10.17	José González; Dominican Republic	10.21
200 metres (wind: +3.1 m/s)	José Figueroa; Puerto Rico	20.21	Alexis Nieves; Venezuela	20.47	José González; Dominican Republic	20.56
400 metres	Omar Elkhatib; Portugal	45.47	Elián Larregina; Argentina	45.57	Kelvis Padrino; Venezuela	45.61
800 metres	David Barroso; Spain	1:46.30	Eduardo Moreira; Brazil	1:46.56	Guilherme Orenhas; Brazil	1:46.82
1500 metres	Valentín Soca; Uruguay	3:41.17	Leonardo Santos; Brazil	3:41.50	Diego Lacamoire; Argentina	3:42.27
5000 metres	Pedro Marín; Colombia	13:57.29	Diego Uribe; Chile	13:59.36	Luis Masabanda; Ecuador	14:01.25
10,000 metres	Valentín Soca; Uruguay	28:28.92	Luis Masabanda; Ecuador	28:33.31	Carlos Díaz; Chile	28:36.98
110 metres hurdles (wind: +1.6 m/s)	Marcos Herrera; Ecuador	13.43 NR	Rafael Pereira; Brazil	13.57	Thiago Ornelas; Brazil	13.64
400 metres hurdles	Bruno De Genaro; Argentina	49.92	Javier Lorente; Spain	50.64	Stiven Méndez; Ecuador	50.71
3000 metres steeplechase	Walace Caldas; Brazil	8:42.69	Gleison Santos; Brazil	8:50.67	Yeferson Cuno; Peru	8:57.23
4 × 100 metres relay	Puerto Rico; Eloy Benitez; José Figueroa; Adrian Canales; Yariel Pérez	38.84	Dominican Republic; Christopher Melenciano; José González; Ángel Pierre; Rafely Romero	39.25	Argentina; Lucas Villegas; Juan Ignacio Ciampitti; Daniel Londero; Tomás Villegas	39.34
4 × 400 metres relay	Venezuela; Javier Gómez; Carlos Zambrano; Axel Gómez; Kelvis Padrino	3:02.88	Puerto Rico; José Figueroa; Jarell Cruz; Yariel Pérez; Alejandro Rosado	3:03.19	Dominican Republic; Érick Sánchez; Christopher Melenciano; Ferdy Agramonte; Rafely Romero	3:03.45
10,000 m walk (track)	Saúl Wamputsrik; Ecuador	40:01.15	Max dos Santos; Brazil	40:07.06	Matheus Corrêa; Brazil	40:15.90
High jump	Thiago Moura; Brazil	2.19 m	Nicolas Numair; Chile	2.16 m	Pablo Martínez; Spain	2.13 m
Pole vault	Isidro Leyva; Spain	5.40 m	Alex Gracia; Spain	5.30 m	Guillermo Correa; Chile	5.20 m
Long jump	Arnovis Dalmero; Colombia	7.97 m w	Carlos Beltrán; Spain	7.91 m	Emiliano Lasa; Uruguay	7.88 m
Triple jump	Elton Petronilho; Brazil	16.65 m	Felipe da Silva; Brazil	16.20 m w	Tiago Costa; Portugal	15.81 m w
Shot put	Willian Dourado; Brazil	20.07 m	Matías Puschel; Chile	17.78 m	Alan Cabanellas; Puerto Rico	17.61 m
Discus throw	Claudio Romero; Chile	65.93 m CR	Emanuel Sousa; Portugal	63.60 m	Juan José Caicedo; Ecuador	63.43 m
Hammer throw	Humberto Mansilla; Chile	74.70 m	Joaquín Gómez; Argentina	74.05 m	Gabriel Kehr; Chile	74.03 m
Javelin throw	Pedro Henrique Rodrigues; Brazil	81.37 m	Leandro Ramos; Portugal	79.58 m	Manu Quijera; Spain	77.67 m
Decathlon	Felipe dos Santos; Brazil	7684 pts	Lucas Catanhede; Brazil	7031 pts	Carlos Córdoba; Venezuela	6531 pts

=== Women ===
Event	Gold		Silver		Bronze	
100 metres (wind: +0.7 m/s)	Ana Carolina Azevedo; Brazil	11.08 CR	María Maturana; Colombia	11.17 NR	Liranyi Alonso; Dominican Republic	11.19
200 metres (wind: +3.4 m/s)	Ana Carolina Azevedo; Brazil	22.50	Marlet Ospino; Colombia	22.83	Estrella de Aza; Dominican Republic	22.95
400 metres	Anabel Medina; Dominican Republic	51.38	Lina Licona; Colombia	51.42	Gabby Scott; Puerto Rico	51.70
800 metres	Déborah Rodríguez; Uruguay	2:03.39	Mayara Leite; Brazil	2:04.11	Berdine Castillo; Chile	2:04.57
1500 metres	Micaela Levaggi; Argentina	4:28.35	Javiera Faletto; Chile	4:29.74	July da Silva; Brazil	4:29.94
5000 metres	Micaela Levaggi; Argentina	15:48.90	Veronica Huacasi; Peru	15:54.14	Benita Parra; Bolivia	16:05.64
10,000 metres	Beatriz Álvarez; Spain	33:45.53	Mary Zeneida; Ecuador	33:49.19	Nélida Peñaflor; Argentina	33:59.48
100 metres hurdles (wind: +3.5 m/s)	Vitoria Alves; Brazil	12.68	Paola Vázquez; Puerto Rico	12.84	Ketiley Batista; Brazil	13.21
400 metres hurdles	Grace Claxton; Puerto Rico	55.74	Rita Silva; Brazil	56.16	Daniela Rojas; Costa Rica	56.50
3000 metres steeplechase	Belén Casetta; Argentina	9:39.75	Tatiane Raquel da Silva; Brazil	9:43.12	Laura Taborda; Portugal	9:43.82
4 × 100 metres relay	Puerto Rico; Adanelys Rodríguez; Gladymar Torres; Legna Echevarría; Frances Colón	43.78	Argentina; Guillermina Cossio; Noelia Martínez; María Florencia Lamboglia; Milagros Damico	45.02	Peru; Aracely Pretell; Cayetana Chirinos; Catalina Yzaga; Paula Daruich	45.88
4 × 400 metres relay	Dominican Republic; Bianca Acosta; Anabel Medina; Milagros Durán; Fiordaliza Cofil	3:30.02	Colombia; Melany Bolaño; Lina Licona; María Alejandra Rocha; Sofía Molina	3:30.44	Puerto Rico; Andrea Rivera; Grace Claxton; Sarai Javier; Gabby Scott	3:30.80 NR
10,000 m walk (track)	Kimberly García; Peru	42:45.06 NR	Mary Luz Andía; Peru	44:34.60	Lidia Sánchez-Puebla; Spain	45:16.52
High jump	Marysabel Senyu; Dominican Republic	1.90 m	Una Stancev; Spain	1.90 m	Maria Eduarda de Oliveira; Brazil	1.76 m
Pole vault	Naiara Pérez; Spain	4.20 m	Beatriz Chagas; Brazil	4.15 m	Carolina Scarponi; Argentina	4.05 m
Long jump	Natalia Linares; Colombia	6.67 m w	Paola Fernández; Puerto Rico	6.66 m	Leticia Oro Melo; Brazil	6.48 m w
Triple jump	Gabriele dos Santos; Brazil	14.06 m	Regiclecia Candido; Brazil	13.47 m w	Thelma Fuentes; Guatemala	13.17 m
Shot put	Ana Caroline Silva; Brazil	17.72 m	Belsy Quiñónez; Ecuador	17.63 m	María Belén Toimil; Spain	17.57 m
Discus throw	Andressa de Morais; Brazil	59.68 m	Ottaynis Febres; Venezuela	54.74 m	Isabella Mosquera; Colombia	50.35 m
Hammer throw	Ximena Zorrilla; Peru	66.32 m	Mayra Gaviria; Colombia	66.20 m	Mariana García; Chile	64.39 m
Javelin throw	Jucilene de Lima; Brazil	60.93 m	Daniella Nisimura; Brazil	58.99 m	Arianne Duarte Morais; Cape Verde	54.58 m
Heptathlon	Jéssica Barreira; Portugal	6126 pts	Roberta Almeida; Brazil	5635 pts	Raiane Vasconcelos; Brazil	5564 pts

=== Mixed ===
Event	Gold		Silver		Bronze	
4 × 100 metres relay	Brazil; Erik Cardoso; Gabriela Mourão; Jorge Vides; Ana Carolina Azevedo	40.99 AR	Argentina; Lucas Villegas; Milagros D'Amico; Tomás Villegas; Guillermina Cossio	41.76	Venezuela; Brayan Alamo; Orangys Jimenez; Alexis Nieves; Glanyernis Guerra	41.95
4 × 400 metres relay	Dominican Republic; Érick Sánchez; Estrella de Aza; Christopher Melenciano; Fiordaliza Cofil	3:15.96 CR	Colombia; Jhonatan Hoyos; Melany Bolaño; Edgar Acevedo; Lina Licona	3:17.83	Puerto Rico; Jarell Cruz; Andrea Rivera; Yariel Pérez; Sarai Rosado	3:17.90 NR

=== Medal table ===
* Host nation (Peru)

Rank	Nation	Gold	Silver	Bronze	Total
1	Brazil	14	14	8	36
2	Puerto Rico	5	3	4	12
3	Argentina	4	4	4	12
3	Spain	4	4	4	12
5	Dominican Republic	4	2	5	11
6	Colombia	3	6	1	10
7	Uruguay	3	0	1	4
8	Chile	2	4	5	11
9	Ecuador	2	3	3	8
10	Peru*	2	2	2	6
10	Portugal	2	2	2	6
12	Venezuela	1	2	3	6
13	Bolivia	0	0	1	1
13	Cape Verde	0	0	1	1
13	Costa Rica	0	0	1	1
13	Guatemala	0	0	1	1
Totals (16 entries)		46	46	46	138

== Participating nations ==
A total of 381 athletes from 20 countries participated. Notable absentees were Cuba and Mexico.

- Argentina (29)
- Bolivia (4)
- Brazil (72)
- Cape Verde (1)
- Chile (26)
- Colombia (26)
- Costa Rica (7)
- Dominican Republic (25)
- Ecuador (25)
- Guatemala (1)
- Honduras (8)
- Panama (2)
- Paraguay (4)
- Peru (35)
- Portugal (18)
- Puerto Rico (32)
- El Salvador (12)
- Spain (16)
- Uruguay (16)
- Venezuela (22)
