= José Figueroa (sprinter) =

Puerto Rican athlete (born 2004)

- Figueroa in 2026

Personal information
- Born: 14 June 2004 (age 22)

Sport
- Sport: Athletics
- Event: Sprint

Achievements and titles
- Personal bests: 60 m: 6.67 (Toa Baja, 2026); 100 m: 10.22 (Carolina, 2026); 200 m: 19.76 (Santo Domingo, 2026) NR; 400 m: 44.49 (Mayagüez, 2026) NR
Medal record
Men's athletics
Representing Puerto Rico
Pan American Championships
Gold medal – first place	2026 Medellín	200 m
Silver medal – second place	2026 Medellín	4×100 m relay
Bronze medal – third place	2026 Medellín	4×400 m relay
NACAC Championships
Bronze medal – third place	2025 Freeport	200 m
Central American and Caribbean Games
Gold medal – first place	2026 Santo Domingo	200 m
Ibero-American Championships
Gold medal – first place	2026 Lima	200 m
Gold medal – first place	2026 Lima	4×100 m relay
Silver medal – second place	2026 Lima	4×400 m relay
Junior Pan American Games
Gold medal – first place	2025 Asunción	200 m
Bronze medal – third place	2025 Asunción	4×400 m relay
Pan American U20 Championships
Silver medal – second place	2023 Mayagüez	4×100 m relay
Bronze medal – third place	2023 Mayagüez	200 m

José Figueroa (born 14 June 2004) is a Puerto Rican sprinter. He is the national record holder over 200 metres and won the bronze medal over 200 metres at the 2025 NACAC Championships. He represented his country at the 2025 World Athletics Championships.

== Biography ==
Figueroa won the bronze medal over 200 metres at the 2023 Pan American U20 Athletics Championships in Mayagüez, Puerto Rico, finishing behind Renan Gallina of Brazil and Garrett Kaalund of the United States, in August 2023. He also won a silver medal in the 4 x 100 metres relay at the Championships.

Figueroa won the bronze medal over 200 metres at the 2025 NACAC Championships in Freeport, Bahamas, finishing behind Aaron Brown of Canada and Jamaican Christopher Taylor. The previous Puerto Rican national record had been stood since 1987 and had been set by Luis Morales with 20.44 seconds. It was the first medal won by a Puerto Rican athlete in the event at the Championships.

That month, he won the 200 metres at the 2025 Junior Pan American Championships, running a national record and championship record time of 20.16 seconds. The time met the automatic qualifying standard for the upcoming world championships. He also won a bronze medalist in the men’s 4 x 400 metres relay at the Championships.

In September 2025, he made his senior major championships debut as he competed at the 2025 World Athletics Championships in Tokyo, Japan but did not advance to the semi-finals, running 20.62 seconds to place sixth in his preliminary heat.

In May 2026, he won over 200 metres and in the men's 4 x 100 metres at the 2026 Ibero-American Championships in Athletics in Peru. The following month, he improved his national record to 19.87 seconds and won the gold medal over 200 metres at the inaugural 2026 Pan American Championships in Medellín. In August 2026, he improved his national record to 19.76 seconds over 200 metres at the Central American and Caribbean Games in Santo Domingo. Competing in the Diamond League at the 2026 Athletissima in Lausanne, Switzerland on 21 August 2026, he placed fourth in the 200 metres in 20.16 seconds. At the 2026 Diamond League Final in Brussels in September, he placed sixth over 200 metres. Later that month, he competed over 200 m at the inaugural World Ultimate Championship in Budapest.
