= Valentín Soca =

Uruguayan athlete

Valentin Soca
Personal information
- Nationality: Uruguayan
- Born: 24 July 2002 (age 24)

Sport
- Sport: Athletics
- Events: 3000 metres; 5000 metres; 10,000 metres

Achievements and titles
- Personal bests: Outdoor; 800 m: 1:48.62 (Ordizia 2026); 1500 m: 3:35.12 NR (Lignano Sabbiadoro 2026); Mile: 3:55.52 (Copenhagen 2026); 5000 m: 13:02.85 (Oordegem 2025); 10000 m: 27:37.65 NR (San Juan Capistrano 2025); Indoor; 1500 m: 3:35.50 AR (Liévin 2026); 3000 m: 7:34.10 AR (Boston 2025); 5000 m: 13:14.09 AR (Boston 2025); Road; 10K: 27:21 (Valencia 2026)
Medal record
Men's athletics
Representing Uruguay
Ibero-American Championships
Gold medal – first place	2026 Lima	1500 m
Gold medal – first place	2026 Lima	10,000 m
South American Games
Gold medal – first place	2026 Santa Fe	1500 m
Gold medal – first place	2026 Santa Fe	5000 m
South American Championships
Gold medal – first place	2023 São Paulo	5000 m
South American U23 Championships
Silver medal – second place	2022 Cascavel	5000 m
Bronze medal – third place	2022 Cascavel	10,000 m

Valentín Soca (Vichadero, Uruguay born 24 July 2002) is an Uruguay long-distance runner. He is the South American record holder over 3000 metres and the South American record holder indoors over 5000 metres. He competed at the 2023 and 2025 World Athletics Championships.

== Biography ==
He won the silver over 5000 metres and the bronze medal over 10,000 metres at the 2022 South American U23 Championships in Cascavel, Brazil.

In April 2023, he set a South American U23 record over 5000 metres of 13:30.68 whilst competing at the Bryan Clay Invitational in the United States. He then won the gold medal in the 5000 metres at the 2023 South American Athletics Championships in São Paulo, Brazil. He competed over 5000 metres at the 2023 World Athletics Championships in Budapest, Hungary.

He won the 5000 metres at the Uruguayan Athletics Championships in Paysandú in April 2024.

On 14 February 2025, making his short track debut, he set a new South American record in the 5000 meters indoors with a time of 13:14.09 seconds at the BU David Hemery Valentine Invitational in Boston, Massachusetts. The following month in Boston, he ran a South American record over 3000 metres of 7:34.10, in doing so he also broke the area record for the 2000 metres.

He was selected to race the 5000 metres at the 2025 World Athletics Championships in Tokyo, Japan in September 2025, where he qualified for the final by placing fifth in his preliminary heat, before placing fifteenth overall.

In March 2026, Soca placed sixth overall in the men's 3000 metres race at the 2026 World Athletics Indoor Championships in Toruń, Poland in 7:37.10. In May, he won over 1500 metres and 10,000 metres at the 2026 Ibero-American Championships in Athletics. Winning the 10,000 metres in 28:28.92 he returned later at the championships to win the 1500 m in 3:41.17.

== Personal life ==
He studied in the United States at California Baptist University, where he competed for the California Baptist Lancers track and field team.
