= Daniella Nisimura =

Brazilian javelin thrower (born 1994)

Personal information
- Full name: Daniella Mieko Nisimura Lorenzon
- Born: 26 March 1994 (age 32)

Sport
- Sport: Athletics
- Event: Javelin throw

Achievements and titles
- Personal best: Javelin: 60.27m (2025)
Medal record
Women's athletics
Representing Brazil
Ibero-American Championships
Silver medal – second place	2026 Lima	Javelin throw
South American Games
Bronze medal – third place	2026 Santa Fe	Javelin throw
South American Championships
Bronze medal – third place	2025 Mar del Plata	Javelin throw

Daniella Mieko Nisimura Lorenzon (born 26 March 1994) is a Brazilian javelin thrower.

== Career ==
Daniella Mieko Nisimura Lorenzon is from São Paulo, but is member of Santa Catarina Athletics Union in São José, Santa Catarina where she received coaching from Marcelo Lima. She had a personal best in the javelin throw of 59.03 set in 2017 prior to taking a break from athletics to start a family. After her return to the sport she trained with Ramon Breto, amongst a group of athletes also containing Flor Ruiz.

She became a two-time national champion at the Brazilian Athletics Championships in 2025, having also won the title in 2024. She won the bronze medal in the javelin throw at the 2025 South American Championships in Mar del Plata, Argentina, throwing a personal best 60.12m in finishing third behind compatriot Jucilene de Lima. In July 2025, she increased her personal best to 60.27 metres whilst competing in Brazil.

She competed at the 2025 World Athletics Championships in Tokyo, Japan, throwing 53.01 metres without advancing to the final.
