= Gladymar Torres =

Puerto Rican athlete

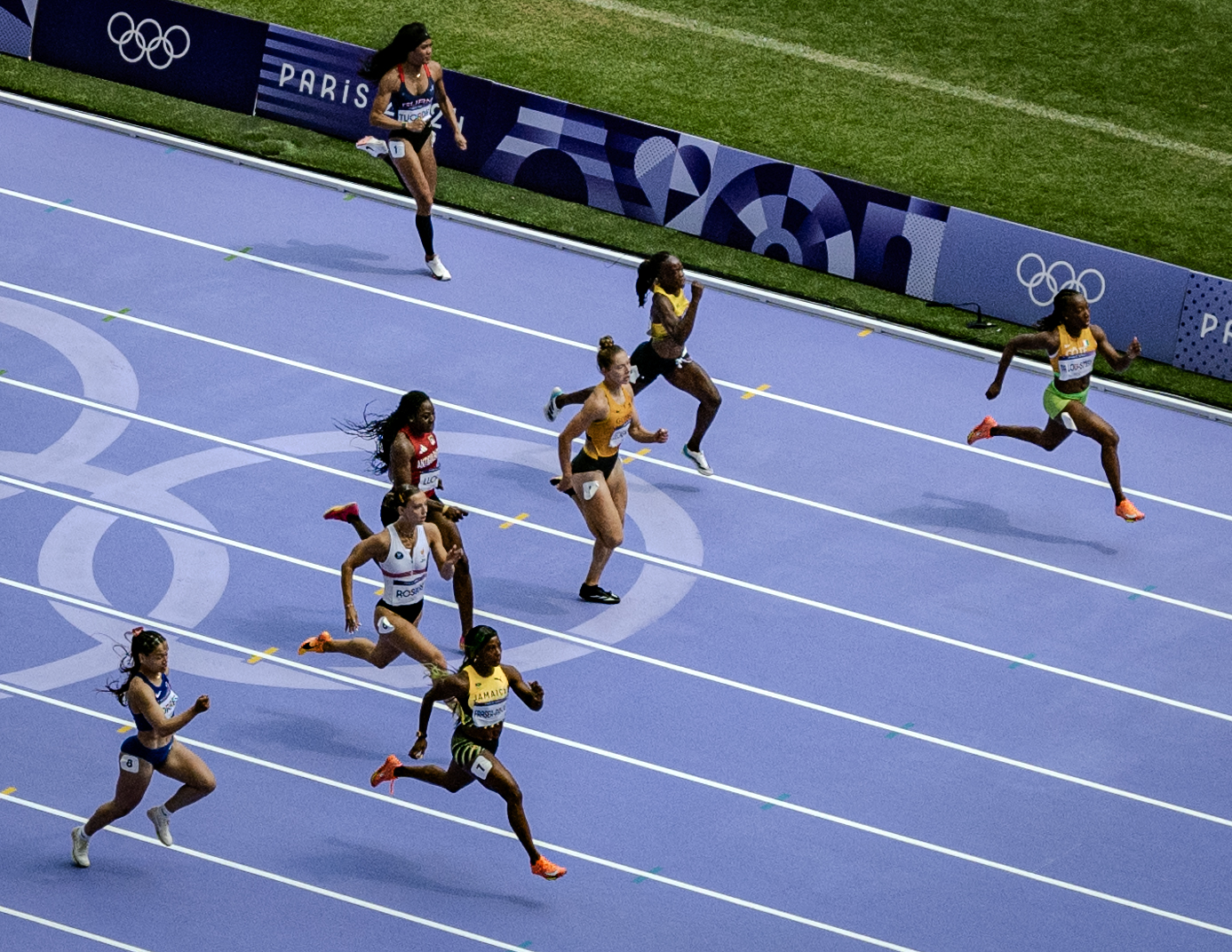
- Competing at the 2024 Olympic Games

Personal information
- Nationality: Puerto Rico
- Born: 26 March 2003 (age 23)

Sport
- Country: Puerto Rico
- Sport: Athletics
- Event: Sprint

Achievements and titles
- Personal bests: 100 m: 11.09 NR (Santo Domingo 2026); Indoors; 60 m: 7.18 NR (Cochabamba 2026)
Medal record
Women's athletics
Representing Puerto Rico
Pan American Championships
Silver medal – second place	2026 Medellín	4 x 100 m relay
Ibero-American Championships
Gold medal – first place	2024 Cuiabá	100 m
Gold medal – first place	2026 Lima	4 x 100 m relay
Central American and Caribbean Games
Silver medal – second place	2026 Santo Domingo	100 m
Silver medal – second place	2026 Santo Domingo	4 x 100 m relay

Gladymar Torres OLY(born 26 March 2003) is a Puerto Rican sprinter. She is a national record holder and national champion over 100 metres. She competed at the Paris 2024 Summer Olympics.

== Biography ==
She lowered her 100 metres personal best to 11.20 seconds at the Ibero American Athletics Championships in May 2024.

She was selected for the Paris Olympics in July 2024. She set a national record time of 11.12 seconds on 2 August 2024 to qualify for the semi finals of the 100 metres at the 2024 Summer Olympics in Paris.

In September 2025, she competed in the 100 metres at the 2025 World Championships in Tokyo, Japan.

Competing in the 100 metres at the 2026 Ibero-American Championships in Athletics, she placed sixth in the final. At the championships, she won a bronze medal with Eloy Benitez, Adrian Canales and Frances Colon in the mixed 4 x 100 metres relay. She was also part of the gold medal winning women's 4 x 100 metres relay team at the championships alongside Colón, Adanelys Rodríguez, and Legna Echevarría, running 43.78 seconds. In June 2026, the same quartet won the silver medal in the women's 4 × 100 m relay team, and set a new national record time of 43.42 seconds, at the 2026 Pan American Championships in Athletics. In August, she won the silver medal in the 100 metres at the 2026 CAC Games in Santo Domingo, Dominican Republic.

== Personal life ==
She attended Ana G. Méndez University.

== Athletics achievements ==
Information from her World Athletics profile unless otherwise noted.

=== Personal bests ===
Type	Distance	Time (s)	Wind (m/s)	Venue	Date	Notes
Individual events
Indoor	60 metres	7.18	—N/a	Cochabamba, Bolivia	26 February 2026	NR
Outdoor	100 metres	11.09	+0.7	Santo Domingo, Dominican Republic	22 August 2026	NR
Outdoor	150 metres	18.10	+0.1	Carolina, Puerto Rico	18 December 2025	
Outdoor	200 metres	23.41	+0.2	El Paso, United States	11 April 2025	
Team events
Outdoor	4 × 100 metres relay	43.41	—N/a	Santo Domingo, Dominican Republic	6 August 2026	NR
Outdoor	Mixed 4 × 100 metres relay	41.39	—N/a	Santo Domingo, Dominican Republic	4 August 2026	

=== International competitions ===
Representing Puerto Rico
Year	Competition	Venue	Position	Event	Time	Notes
2019	NACAC U18 Championships	Querétaro, Mexico	9th (h)	100 m	12.13	
2019	NACAC U18 Championships	Querétaro, Mexico	9th (h)	200 m	24.84	
2019	NACAC U18 Championships	Querétaro, Mexico	5th	Mixed 4 x 400 m relay		
2022	World U20 Championships	Cali, Colombia	40th (h)	100 m	11.87	
2022	World U20 Championships	Cali, Colombia	43rd (h)	200 m	24.58	
2023	NACAC U23 Championships	San José, Costa Rica	9th (h)	100 m	11.77	
2024	Ibero-American Championships	Cuiabá, Brazil	1st	100 m	11.21	
2024	Olympic Games	Paris, France	21st (sf)	100 m	11.33	
2025	NACAC Championships	Freeport, The Bahamas	10th (h)	100 m	11.36	
2025	Junior Pan American Games	Asunción, Paraguay	5th	100 m	11.50	
2025	Junior Pan American Games	Asunción, Paraguay	—	4 x 100 m relay	DQ	TR24.7
2025	World Championships	Tokyo, Japan	44th (h)	100 m	11.52	
2026	South American Indoor Championships	Cochabamba, Bolivia	2nd (h)	60 m	7.33	OC
2026	World Indoor Championships	Toruń, Poland	33rd (h)	60 m	7.33	
2026	Ibero-American Championships	Lima, Peru	6th	100 m	11.31	
2026	Ibero-American Championships	Lima, Peru	1st	4 x 100 m relay	43.78	
2026	Ibero-American Championships	Lima, Peru	4th	Mixed 4 x 100 m relay	42.08	
2026	Pan American Championships	Medellín, Colombia	4th	100 m	11.22	
2026	Pan American Championships	Medellín, Colombia	2nd	4 x 100 m relay	43.42	NR
2026	Pan American Championships	Medellín, Colombia	—	Mixed 4 x 100 m relay	DNF	
2026	Central American and Caribbean Games	Santo Domingo, Dominican Republic	2nd	100 m	11.22	
2026	Central American and Caribbean Games	Santo Domingo, Dominican Republic	2nd	4 x 100 m relay	43.41	NR
2026	Central American and Caribbean Games	Santo Domingo, Dominican Republic	4th	Mixed 4 x 100 m relay	41.39	
