= Eloy Benitez =

Puerto Rican athlete (born 2003)

Personal information
- Full name: Eloy Benitez Castro
- Born: 7 May 2003 (age 23)

Sport
- Sport: Athletics
- Event: Sprint

Achievements and titles
- Personal bests: 60 m: 6.46 s (Cochabamba, 2026) NR; 100 m: 9.95 s (Clermont, 2025) NR
Medal record
Men's athletics
Representing Puerto Rico
Pan American Championships
Bronze medal – third place	2026 Medellín	100 m
Ibero-American Championships
Gold medal – first place	2026 Lima	100 m
Gold medal – first place	2026 Lima	4×100 m relay
Bronze medal – third place	2026 Lima	Mixed 4×100 m

Eloy Benitez Castro (born 7 May 2003) is a Puerto Rican sprinter, he holds the Puerto Rico national records for the 60 metres and 100 metres.

== Biography ==
In May 2025, he set a national record for the 100 metres, running 9.95 seconds in Florida, during the PURE Athletics Sprint Elite Meet.

In 2025, he ran a national record 6.56 seconds for the 60 metres. He competed at the 2025 World Athletics Indoor Championships in Nanjing, qualifying for the semi-finals with a new personal best and national record of 6.49 seconds. He also won his semi-final with a run of 6.52 seconds, with only a hundredth of a second separating the three semi-final winners. However, Benitez stumbled and pulled up injured early in the final and was unable to finish the race, eventually won by Jeremiah Azu of Great Britain.

In September 2025, he competed in the 100 metres at the 2025 World Championships in Tokyo, Japan. On 1 February, Benitez placed placed second in the 60 metres at the 2026 Millrose Games in 6.60 seconds. That month, he lowereed his 60 m personal best to 6.46 in Cochabamba, Bolivia. He ran 6.57 seconds in the semi-final of the 60 m at the 2026 World Athletics Indoor Championships in Toruń, Poland. In May, he won over 100 metres and in the men's 4 x 100 metres at the 2026 Ibero-American Championships in Athletics in Peru. At the championships, he also won a bronze medal with Gladymar Torres, Adrian Canales and Frances Colon in the mixed 4 x 100 metres relay. Selected for the inaugural 2026 Pan American Championships in Athletics in Medellín, he placed third the 100 metres final, running 9.98 seconds on 26 June, finishing behind Canadian Eliezer Adjibi and race winner Ronal Longa of Colombia.

== Personal life ==
He attended the Interamerican University of Puerto Rico.
