= Thiago Ornelas =

Brazilian athlete (born 2004)

Personal information
- Born: Thiago Resende Ornelas dos Santos; 30 April 2004 (age 22)

Sport
- Sport: Athletics
- Event: Hurdles

Achievements and titles
- Personal bests: 60 m hurdles: 7.67 (Cochabamba, 2025); 110 m hurdles: 13.42 (Sāo Paulo, 2024)
Medal record
Representing Brazil
Men's athletics
Ibero-American Championships
Bronze medal – third place	2026 Lima	110 m hurdles
South American Games
Bronze medal – third place	2026 Santa Fe	110 m hurdles
South American Championships
Silver medal – second place	2025 Mar del Plata	110 m hurdles
South American Indoor Championships
Silver medal – second place	2025 Cochabamba	60 m hurdles
Junior Pan American Games
Silver medal – second place	2025 Asunción	110 m hurdles

Thiago Resende Ornelas dos Santos (born 30 April 2004) is a Brazilian sprint hurdler. He was a silver medalist at the South American Championships in 2025 over 100 metres hurdles, and a silver medalist over 60 metres hurdles at the 2025 South American Indoor Championships.

== Biography ==
He is a member of Taubaté Athletics Sports Association in Taubaté, Sāo Paulo.

He won a silver medal in the 60 metres hurdles at the 2025 South American Indoor Championships in Athletics in Cochabamba, Bolivia, running 7.67 seconds in the final to miss the gold medal by only a fraction of a second from his compatriot Eduardo de Deus who was credited with the same time.

He won the Brazilian under-23 championships over 110 metres hurdles in April 2025. He won the silver medal in the 110 metres hurdles at the 2025 South American Championships in Athletics in Mar del Plata, Argentina in April 2025.

He was a semi-finalist in the 1100 metres hurdles at the 2025 World Athletics Championships in Tokyo, Japan.

In March 2026, he was a semi-finalist over 60 metres hurdles at the 2026 World Athletics Indoor Championships.
