= Athletics at the 2026 South American Games =

Athletics competitions at the 2026 South American Games

Athletics at the XIII South American Games
- Dates: September 22–25
- Host city: Santa Fe, Argentina
- Venue: Centro de Alto Rendimiento Deportivo Pedro Candioti
- Level: Senior
- Events: 44 (22 men, 20 women, 2 mixed)
- Participation: 357 athletes from 15 nations
- Records set: 19 games records, 7 national records

Athletics competitions at the 2026 South American Games in Rosario, Santa Fe, and Rafaela, Argentina, were held between September 22 and 25 at Centro de Alto Rendimiento Deportivo Pedro Candioti (Atletismo CARD), located within Parque del Sur in Santa Fe.

A total of 44 events were contested. Athletes who achieve the gold medal in each individual event will qualify for the 2027 Pan American Games athletics competitions, with the qualification quotas going to the athletes and not their NOCs.

== Medal summary ==
=== Medal table ===
* Host nation (Argentina)

Rank	Nation	Gold	Silver	Bronze	Total
1	Brazil	14	15	9	38
2	Colombia	8	5	7	20
3	Venezuela	4	6	5	15
4	Chile	4	5	2	11
5	Argentina*	4	4	8	16
6	Panama	4	0	0	4
7	Uruguay	3	3	0	6
8	Ecuador	1	4	8	13
9	Paraguay	1	0	1	2
10	Curaçao	1	0	0	1
11	Peru	0	3	0	3
12	Guyana	0	0	2	2
13	Bolivia	0	0	1	1
Totals (13 entries)		44	45	43	132

=== Medalists ===
==== Men's events ====
Event	Gold		Silver		Bronze	
100 metres	Ronal Longa; Colombia	10.10	Bryant Álamo; Venezuela	10.24	Alexis Nieves; Venezuela	10.33
200 metres	Ronal Longa; Colombia	20.43	Katriel Angulo; Ecuador	20.50	Shamar Horatio; Guyana	20.53
400 metres	Alison dos Santos; Brazil	44.61 GR	Javier Gómez; Venezuela	45.48	Martín Kouyoumdjian; Chile	45.99
800 metres	Chamar Chambers; Panama	1:46.45	Ryan López; Venezuela	1:47.00	Rafael Muñoz; Chile	1:47.14
1500 metres	Valentín Soca; Uruguay	3:46.05	Diego Lacamoire; Argentina	3:47.16	Gerson Montes; Ecuador	3:47.71
5000 metres	Valentín Soca; Uruguay	13:26.53 GR	Santiago Catrofe; Uruguay	13:32.19	Luis Masabanda; Ecuador	13:38.48
10,000 metres	Santiago Catrofe; Uruguay	28:16.79 GR	Matías Reynaga; Argentina	28:26.17	Luis Masabanda; Ecuador	28:36.73
110 metres hurdles	Rafael Pereira; Brazil	13.52	Martín Sáenz; Chile	13.81	Thiago Resende; Brazil	13.89
400 metres hurdles	Matheus Lima; Brazil	48.58 GR	Francisco Viana; Brazil	48.73	Bruno de Genaro; Argentina	49.76
3000 metres steeplechase	Diddier Rodríguez; Panama	8:31.89 GR	Wallace Evangelista; Brazil	8:32.33 PB	Carlos San Martín; Colombia	8:33.01
4 × 100 metres relay	Colombia; Carlos Flórez; John Paredes; Carlos Palácios; Ronal Longa	39.09	Venezuela; Eubrig Maza; Bryant Álamo; Alexis Nieves; Ángel Ramírez	39.14	Guyana; Akeem Stewart; Onesi Dunn; Revon Williams; Shamar Horatio	39.23
4 × 400 metres relay	Venezuela; Kelvis Padrino; José Antonio Maita; Axel Gómez; Javier Gómez	3:03.38 GR	Argentina; Bruno de Genaro; Juan Ciampitti; Agustín Pinti; Elián Larregina	3:06.29	Colombia; Neiker Abello; Daniel Balanta; Deiner Guaitoto; Jhonatan Julio	3:09.87
Half marathon race walk	Caio Bonfim; Brazil	1:22:31 GR	Alexander Hurtado; Ecuador	1:22:38	Jordy Jiménez; Ecuador	1:23:26
High jump	Fernando Ferreira; Brazil	2.14	Gilmar Correa; Venezuela	2.14	Thiago Moura; Brazil	2.11
Pole vault	Augusto Dutra de Oliveira; Brazil	5.40	Dyander Pacho; Ecuador	5.20	Not awarded	
Pole vault	Augusto Dutra de Oliveira; Brazil	5.40	Ricardo Montes de Oca; Venezuela	5.20	Not awarded	
Long jump	Arnovis Dalmero; Colombia	7.96	Emiliano Lasa; Uruguay	7.83	Christopher Thiessen; Paraguay	7.70
Triple jump	Elton Petronilho; Brazil	16.84 GR	Felipe Izidoro; Brazil	16.00	Nazareno Melgarejo; Argentina	15.45
Shot put	Willian Dourado; Brazil	20.27	Welington Morais; Brazil	20.19	Ronald Grueso; Colombia	18.74
Discus throw	Claudio Romero; Chile	65.33 GR	Wellinton da Cruz Filho; Brazil	61.18	Juan Caicedo; Ecuador	60.92
Hammer throw	Humberto Mansilla; Chile	75.27	Gabriel Kehr; Chile	75.05	Joaquín Gómez; Argentina	73.46
Javelin throw	Lars Flaming; Paraguay	84.36 GR	Pedro Henrique Rodrigues; Brazil	82.40	Billy Julio; Colombia	80.78
Decathlon	José Fernando Ferreira; Brazil	7822	Felipe dos Santos; Brazil	7656	Carlos Córdoba; Venezuela	7209

==== Women's events ====
Event	Gold		Silver		Bronze	
100 metres	Orangys Jiménez; Venezuela	11.39	Ana Carolina Azevedo; Brazil	11.58	Aimara Nazareno; Ecuador	11.60
200 metres	Orangys Jiménez; Venezuela	22.63 GR	Nicole Caicedo; Ecuador	22.95	Ana Carolina Azevedo; Brazil	23.26
400 metres	Martina Weil; Chile	50.45 GR	Lina Licona; Colombia	52.38	Megan Powell; Argentina	52.81
800 metres	Valentina Barrientos; Chile	2:03.31	Deborah Rodríguez; Uruguay	2:04.16	Mayara Leite; Brazil	2:04.26
1500 metres	Micaela Levaggi; Argentina	4:22.43	Laura Acuña; Chile	4:23.22	Tatiane Raquel da Silva; Brazil	4:23.42
5000 metres	Micaela Levaggi; Argentina	15:48.73	Lizaida Valdivia; Peru	15:53.97	Carmen Alder; Ecuador	15:54.23
10,000 metres	Mary Granja; Ecuador	32:29.50	Luz Mery Rojas; Peru	32:32.00	Nélida Peñaflor; Argentina	32:34.35
100 metres hurdles	Vitória Sena; Brazil	13.05 GR	Ketiley Batista; Brazil	13.31	Helen Bernard Stilling; Argentina	13.48
400 metres hurdles	Gianna Woodruff; Panama	54.11 GR	María Alejandra Rocha; Colombia	56.04	Rita Ferreira; Brazil	56.15
3000 metres steeplechase	Belén Casetta; Argentina	9:35.44 GR	Tatiane Raquel da Silva; Brazil	9:44.10	Micaela Levaggi; Argentina	9:49.63
4 × 100 metres relay	Colombia; Marlet Ospino; Angélica Gamboa; Danna Banquez; María Camila Maturana	44.36 GR	Chile; Catalina Rozas; María Ignacia Montt; Pilar Rodríguez; Belén Ituarte	44.65	Brazil; Jaíny Suelen; Ana Carolina Azevedo; Larissa de Jesus; Vitória Cristina Rosa	44.79
4 × 400 metres relay	Colombia; María Alejandra Rocha; Melany Bolaño; Marlet Ospino; Lina Licona	3:32.21	Brazil; Júlia Ribeiro; Letícia Nonato; Jaíny Sulen; Maria Victoria Sena	3:33.54	Argentina; María Florencia Lamboglia; Noelia Martínez; Guillermina Cossio; Megan Powell	3:35.55
High jump	Glenka Antonia; Curaçao	1.87	Maria Eduarda de Oliveira; Brazil	1.85	María Isabel Arboleda; Colombia	1.85
Pole vault	Juliana Campos; Brazil	4.40	Beatriz Chagas; Brazil	4.30	Luna Pabón; Colombia	4.25
Long jump	Nathalee Aranda; Panama	6.48	Javiera Musalem; Chile	6.32	Letícia Oro Melo; Brazil	6.10
Triple jump	Gabriele dos Santos; Brazil	13.57	Regiclécia Cândido; Brazil	13.16	Valeria Quispe; Bolivia	12.74
Discus throw	Andressa de Morais; Brazil	59.36	Yerlin Mesa; Colombia	55.49	Ottaynis Febres; Venezuela	51.98
Hammer throw	Mayra Gaviria; Colombia	66.35	Ximena Zorrilla; Peru	64.43	Rosa Rodríguez; Venezuela	64.34
Javelin throw	Flor Ruiz; Colombia	62.30	Jucilene de Lima; Brazil	54.71	Daniella Nisimura; Brazil	54.69
Heptathlon	Paloma Cardoso; Brazil	5633	Mariangelic Rojas; Venezuela	5549	Marienger Chirinos; Venezuela	5509

==== Mixed event ====
Event	Gold		Silver		Bronze	
4 × 100 m relay	Venezuela; Bryant Álamo; Orangys Jiménez; Alexis Nieves; Glanyernis Guerra	41.87 GR	Argentina; Lucas Villegas; Milagros D'Amico; Tomás Mondino; Guillermina Cossio	42.22	Colombia; Carlos Flórez; Angélica Gamboa; Carlos Palacios; Danna Banquez	42.37
4 × 400 m relay	Argentina; Agustín Pinti; María Lamboglia; Elian Larregina; Megan Powell	3:16.93 GR, NR	Colombia; Daniel Balanta; Melany Bolaño; Julio Angulo; Lina Licona	3:17.78	Ecuador; Dhustin Morquecho; Genesis Cañola; Mateus Méndez; Nicole Caicedo	3:18.33 NR

== Participation ==
Fifteen nations participated in the athletics events of the 2026 South American Games.

- Argentina (46)
- Aruba (2)
- Bolivia (26)
- Brazil (58)
- Chile (28)
- Colombia (39)
- Curaçao (6)
- Ecuador (28)
- Guyana (14)
- Panama (6)
- Paraguay (20)
- Peru (35)
- Suriname (2)
- Uruguay (15)
- Venezuela (32)
