= Athletics at the 2024 Summer Olympics – Women's 400 metres =

Women's 400 metres at the Games of the XXXIII Olympiad
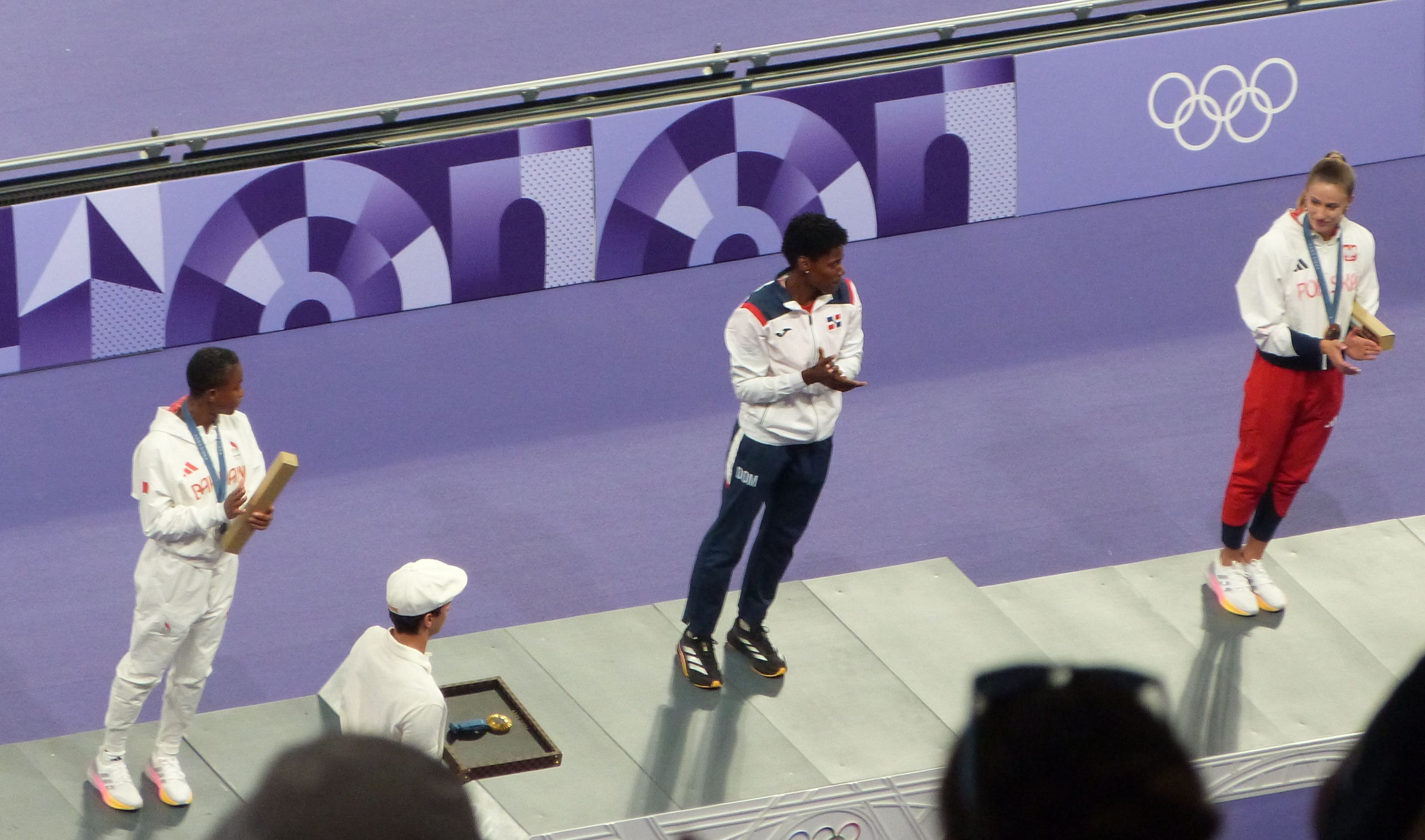
- The podium of the final
- Venue: Stade de France, Paris, France
- Dates: 5 August 2024 (heats); 6 August 2024 (repechage round); 7 August 2024 (semi-finals); 9 August 2024 (final)
- Winning time: 48.17 OR

Medalists
1st place, gold medalist(s)		Marileidy Paulino	Dominican Republic
2nd place, silver medalist(s)		Salwa Eid Naser	Bahrain
3rd place, bronze medalist(s)		Natalia Kaczmarek	Poland

Official Video

The women's 400 metres at the 2024 Summer Olympics was held in four rounds at the Stade de France in Paris, France, between 5 and 9 August 2024. This was the sixteenth time that the women's 400 metres was contested at the Summer Olympics. A total of 48 athletes were able to qualify for the event by entry standard or ranking.

== Summary ==
Tokyo champion Shaunae Miller-Uibo returned to defend her title, despite having given birth in 2023 and withdrawing from the Bahamian Championships due to injury. Marileidy Paulino, the silver medalist from Tokyo, was viewed as one of the favourites before the Games after her 48.76 s clocking to win the 2023 World Championships. NCAA champion Nickisha Pryce had run 48.57 s to win the London Diamond League, to be the world leader going into the Games. Other athletes seen as contenders for medals included 2019 World Champion Salwa Eid Naser, reigning European Champion Natalia Kaczmarek, 2023 NCAA Champion Rhasidat Adeleke and U.S Champion Kendall Ellis.

In the final, Naser started fastest, reaching the 100 m mark first in 11.73 s. Paulino followed in second with Amber Anning third. At the 200 m point, Paulino led, having overtaken Naser to reach 200 m in 22.81 s. Kaczmarek made up ground to be third at the 200 m mark. Over the next 100 m, Adeleke passed Kaczmarek to be in bronze medal position. In the final straight, Paulino extended her lead over Naser and Kaczmarek was able to accelerate and pass Adeleke for the bronze medal.

Paulino's time of 48.17 broke Marie-José Pérec's 28 year old Olympic record and her own National Record. Anning also set a new British National Record in fourth. All eight finalists finished under 50 seconds for the first time ever.

== Background ==
The women's 400 metres has been present on the Olympic athletics programme since 1964.

Global records before the 2024 Summer Olympics
Record	Athlete (nation)	Time (s)	Location	Date
World record	Marita Koch (GDR)	47.60	Canberra, Australia	6 October 1985
Olympic record	Marie-José Pérec (FRA)	48.25	Atlanta, United States	29 July 1996
World leading	Nickisha Pryce (JAM)	48.57	London, United Kingdom	20 July 2024

Area records before the 2024 Summer Olympics
Area record	Athlete (nation)	Time (s)
Africa (records)	Falilat Ogunkoya (NGR)	49.10
Asia (records)	Salwa Eid Naser (BHR)	48.14
Europe (records)	Marita Koch (GDR)	47.60 WR
North, Central America and Caribbean (records)	Shaunae Miller-Uibo (BAH)	48.36
Oceania (records)	Cathy Freeman (AUS)	48.63
South America (records)	Ximena Restrepo (COL)	49.64

== Qualification ==
For the women's 400 metres event, the qualification period was between 1 July 2023 and 30 June 2024. 48 athletes were able to qualify for the event, with a maximum of three athletes per nation, by running the entry standard of 50.95 seconds or faster or by their World Athletics Ranking for this event.

== Results ==
=== Heats ===
The heats were held on 5 August, starting at 11:55 (UTC+2) in the morning. 48 athletes qualified for the first round by qualification time or world ranking. Qualification: First 3 in each heat (Q) advance to the semi-finals, all others (Re) advance to the repechage round (except DNS, DNF, DQ)

==== Heat 1 ====
Rank	Lane	Athlete	Nation	Time	Notes
1	3	Salwa Eid Naser	Bahrain	49.91	Q
2	8	Stacey-Ann Williams	Jamaica	50.16	Q, SB
3	4	Andrea Miklós	Romania	50.54	Q, PB
4	2	Gabby Scott	Puerto Rico	50.74	NR
5	5	Kendall Ellis	United States	51.16	
6	6	Sophie Becker	Ireland	51.84	
7	9	Tereza Petržilková	Czech Republic	51.92	
8	7	Modesta Justė Morauskaitė	Lithuania	52.00	SB

==== Heat 2 ====
Rank	Lane	Athlete	Nation	Time	Notes
1	8	Nickisha Pryce	Jamaica	50.02	Q
2	7	Laviai Nielsen	Great Britain	50.36	Q
3	2	Henriette Jæger	Norway	50.39	Q
4	4	Justyna Święty-Ersetic	Poland	50.95	SB
5	6	Ellie Beer	Australia	51.47	PB
6	5	Lina Licona	Colombia	51.85	
7	3	Zoe Sherar	Canada	51.97	

==== Heat 3 ====
Rank	Lane	Athlete	Nation	Time	Notes
1	8	Amber Anning	Great Britain	49.68	Q
2	2	Lieke Klaver	Netherlands	49.96	Q
3	6	Paola Morán	Mexico	51.04	Q
4	9	Martina Weil	Chile	51.15	
5	7	Alice Mangione	Italy	51.60	
6	3	Ella Onojuvwevwo	Nigeria	51.65	
7	4	Tiffani Marinho	Brazil	52.62	
8	5	Cátia Azevedo	Portugal	52.73	

==== Heat 4 ====
Rank	Lane	Athlete	Nation	Time	Notes
1	4	Natalia Kaczmarek	Poland	49.98	Q
2	9	Roxana Gómez	Cuba	50.38	Q, SB
3	5	Sada Williams	Barbados	50.45	Q
4	6	Victoria Ohuruogu	Great Britain	50.93	
5	3	Gunta Vaičule	Latvia	51.13	
6	2	Helena Ponette	Belgium	51.75	
7	7	Shaunae Miller-Uibo	Bahamas	2:29.29	
	8	Esther Joseph	Nigeria	DQ	TR17.2.3

==== Heat 5 ====
Rank	Lane	Athlete	Nation	Time	Notes
1	5	Marileidy Paulino	Dominican Republic	49.42	Q
2	7	Aaliyah Butler	United States	50.52	Q
3	6	Susanne Gogl-Walli	Austria	50.67	Q, PB
4	8	Sharlene Mawdsley	Ireland	50.71	PB
5	4	Aliyah Abrams	Guyana	51.55	SB
6	9	Lurdes Gloria Manuel	Czech Republic	52.20	
7	2	Kiran Pahal	India	52.51	
8	3	Cynthia Bolingo	Belgium	52.77	SB

==== Heat 6 ====
Rank	Lane	Athlete	Nation	Time	Notes
1	5	Rhasidat Adeleke	Ireland	50.09	Q
2	7	Alexis Holmes	United States	50.35	Q
3	8	Junelle Bromfield	Jamaica	51.36	Q
4	2	Miranda Coetzee	South Africa	51.58	
5	6	Lada Vondrová	Czech Republic	51.80	
6	3	Lauren Gale	Canada	53.13	
7	4	Evelis Aguilar	Colombia	53.36	
	9	Nicole Caicedo	Ecuador	DQ	TR16.8

=== Repechage round ===
The repechage round was held on 6 August, starting at 11:20 (UTC+2).

==== Heat 1 ====
Rank	Lane	Athlete	Nation	Result	Notes
1	5	Ella Onojuvwevwo	Nigeria	50.59	Q
2	4	Justyna Święty-Ersetic	Poland	50.89	SB
3	3	Sharlene Mawdsley	Ireland	51.18	
4	7	Tereza Petržilková	Czech Republic	51.46	SB
5	8	Aliyah Abrams	Guyana	51.84	
6	6	Kiran Pahal	India	52.59	

==== Heat 2 ====
Rank	Lane	Athlete	Nation	Result	Notes
1	4	Gabby Scott	Puerto Rico	50.52	Q, NR
2	8	Miranda Coetzee	South Africa	50.66	q, PB
3	5	Lurdes Gloria Manuel	Czech Republic	50.81	q
4	6	Modesta Justė Morauskaitė	Lithuania	51.33	PB
5	7	Helena Ponette	Belgium	51.46	PB
6	3	Martina Weil	Chile	51.79	
7	2	Shaunae Miller-Uibo	Bahamas	53.50	

==== Heat 3 ====
Rank	Lane	Athlete	Nation	Result	Notes
1	8	Victoria Ohuruogu	Great Britain	50.59	Q, SB
2	2	Gunta Vaičule	Latvia	50.93	
3	6	Alice Mangione	Italy	51.07	PB
4	4	Ellie Beer	Australia	51.65	
5	5	Cátia Azevedo	Portugal	52.04	SB
6	3	Lauren Gale	Canada	52.68	
7	7	Evelis Aguilar	Colombia	52.86	SB

==== Heat 4 ====
Rank	Lane	Athlete	Nation	Result	Notes
1	8	Kendall Ellis	United States	50.44	Q
2	6	Sophie Becker	Ireland	51.28	
3	7	Zoe Sherar	Canada	51.43	
4	4	Lina Licona	Colombia	51.90	
5	5	Lada Vondrová	Czech Republic	52.15	
6	2	Tiffani Marinho	Brazil	52.32	
	3	Cynthia Bolingo	Belgium	DNS	

=== Semi-finals ===
The semi-finals were held on 7 August, starting at 20:45 (UTC+2) in the evening.

==== Semi-final 1 ====
Rank	Lane	Athlete	Nation	Time	Notes
1	7	Salwa Eid Naser	Bahrain	49.08	Q, SB
2	8	Rhasidat Adeleke	Ireland	49.95	Q
3	4	Henriette Jæger	Norway	50.17	q
4	6	Lieke Klaver	Netherlands	50.44	
5	3	Victoria Ohuruogu	Great Britain	51.14	
6	5	Aaliyah Butler	United States	51.18	
7	2	Gabby Scott	Puerto Rico	51.22	
8	9	Junelle Bromfield	Jamaica	51.93	

==== Semi-final 2 ====
Rank	Lane	Athlete	Nation	Time	Notes
1	6	Marileidy Paulino	Dominican Republic	49.21	Q
2	5	Alexis Holmes	United States	50.00	Q
3	7	Laviai Nielsen	Great Britain	50.69	
4	8	Nickisha Pryce	Jamaica	50.77	
5	9	Andrea Miklós	Romania	50.78	
6	3	Ella Onojuvwevwo	Nigeria	51.05	
7	4	Susanne Gogl-Walli	Austria	51.17	
8	2	Lurdes Gloria Manuel	Czech Republic	51.42	

==== Semi-final 3 ====
Rank	Lane	Athlete	Nation	Time	Notes
1	7	Natalia Kaczmarek	Poland	49.45	Q
2	6	Amber Anning	Great Britain	49.47	Q, PB
3	4	Sada Williams	Barbados	49.89	q
4	2	Kendall Ellis	United States	50.40	
5	5	Roxana Gómez	Cuba	50.48	
6	9	Paola Morán	Mexico	50.73	
7	8	Stacey-Ann Williams	Jamaica	50.79	
8	3	Miranda Coetzee	South Africa	51.60	

=== Final ===
The final was held on 9 August, starting at 21:40 (UTC+2) in the evening.

Rank	Lane	Athlete	Nation	Time	Notes
1st place, gold medalist(s)	6	Marileidy Paulino	Dominican Republic	48.17	OR, AR
2nd place, silver medalist(s)	8	Salwa Eid Naser	Bahrain	48.53	SB
3rd place, bronze medalist(s)	7	Natalia Kaczmarek	Poland	48.98	
4	4	Rhasidat Adeleke	Ireland	49.28	
5	5	Amber Anning	Great Britain	49.29	NR
6	9	Alexis Holmes	United States	49.77	PB
7	2	Sada Williams	Barbados	49.83	
8	3	Henriette Jæger	Norway	49.96	
