= Ketiley Batista =

Brazilian hurdler (born 1999)

Personal information
- Born: 13 July 1999 (age 27) Caraguatatuba, Brazil

Sport
- Sport: Athletics
- Event: 100 metres hurdles

Ketiley Batista (born 13 July 1999) is a Brazilian athlete. She competed in the women's 100 metres hurdles event at the 2020 Summer Olympics.

== Personal bests ==
Her best results are:

- 100m hurdles: 13.00 (wind: +1.2 m/s) – (Brazil) Bragança Paulista, 24 Apr 2021
- 100m hurdles: 12.96 (wind: +2.8 m/s) – (Ecuador) Guayaquil, 29 May 2021

== International competitions ==
Year	Competition	Venue	Position	Event	Notes
Representing Brazil
2021	South American Championships	Guayaquil, Ecuador	1st	100 m hurdles	12.96 (w)
2021	Olympic Games	Tokyo, Japan	35th (h)	100 m hurdles	13.40
2021	South American U23 Championships	Guayaquil, Ecuador	1st	100 m hurdles	13.45 (w)
2021	Junior Pan American Games (U23)	Cali, Colombia	2nd	100 m hurdles	13.27
2022	South American Indoor Championships	Cochabamba, Bolivia	1st	60 m hurdles	8.41
2022	World Indoor Championships	Belgrade, Serbia	39th (h)	60 m hurdles	8.37
2022	Ibero-American Championships	La Nucía, Spain	4th	100 m hurdles	13.33
2022	Ibero-American Championships	La Nucía, Spain	–	4 × 100 m relay	DNF
2022	World Championships	Eugene, United States	37th (h)	100 m hurdles	14.22
2023	Pan American Games	Santiago, Chile	4th	100 m hurdles	13.38
2024	South American Indoor Championships	Cochabamba, Bolivia	1st	60 m hurdles	8.09
2024	World Indoor Championships	Glasgow, United Kingdom	39th (h)	60 m hurdles	8.60
2024	Ibero-American Championships	Cuiabá, Brazil	2nd	100 m hurdles	13.22
2025	South American Indoor Championships	Cochabamba, Bolivia	1st	60 m hurdles	8.11
2025	South American Championships	Mar del Plata, Argentina	1st	100 m hurdles	13.22 (w)
2025	World Championships	Tokyo, Japan	38th (h)	100 m hurdles	13.30
2026	World Indoor Championships	Toruń, Poland	43rd (h)	60 m hurdles	8.25
2026	Ibero-American Championships	Lima, Peru	3rd	100 m hurdles	13.21
2026	South American Games	Santa Fe, Argentina	2nd	100 m hurdles	13.31
