= Diego Lacamoire =

Argentine middle-distance runner

Personal information
- Full name: Diego Javier Lacamoire
- Born: May 9, 1998 (age 28) Mar del Plata, Argentina

Sport
- Sport: Athletics
- Events: 800 metres; 1500 metres; 3000 metres steeplechase; 4 × 400 metres relay
Medal record
Representing Argentina
Men's athletics
Ibero-American Championships
Bronze medal – third place	2026 Lima	1500 m
South American Games
Silver medal – second place	2026 Santa Fe	1500 m
South American Championships
Gold medal – first place	2023 São Paulo	1500 m
Gold medal – first place	2025 Mar del Plata	1500 m
Silver medal – second place	2019 Lima	1500 m

Diego Javier Lacamoire (born 9 May 1998) is an Argentine middle-distance runner. He represented his country at the 2023 World Championships without reaching the semifinals. In addition, he won several medals at regional level.

== International competitions ==
Year	Competition	Venue	Position	Event	Notes
Representing Argentina
2017	South American U20 Championships	Leonora, Guyana	4th	3000 m s'chase	9:53.40
2018	South American U23 Championships	Cuenca, Ecuador	9th	800 m	1:56.54
2018	South American U23 Championships	Cuenca, Ecuador	8th	1500 m	4:07.30
2019	South American Championships	Lima, Peru	7th	800 m	1:49.77
2019	South American Championships	Lima, Peru	2nd	1500 m	3:55.15
2019	Pan American Games	Lima, Peru	9th	1500 m	3:45.36
2020	South American Indoor Championships	Cochabamba, Bolivia	6th	800 m	2:00.82
2020	South American Indoor Championships	Cochabamba, Bolivia	—N/a	1500 m	DNF
2021	South American Championships	Cuenca, Ecuador	7th (h)	800 m	1:50.67^{1}
2021	South American Championships	Cuenca, Ecuador	5th	1500 m	3:44.17
2022	Ibero-American Championships	La Nucia, Spain	7th	800 m	1:48.19
2022	South American Games	Asunción, Paraguay	7th	800 m	1:52.44
2023	South American Championships	São Paulo, Brazil	1st	1500 m	3:47.99
2023	World Championships	Budapest, Hungary	36th (h)	1500 m	3:38.92
2023	Pan American Games	Santiago, Chile	7th	1500 m	3:40.67
2023	Pan American Games	Santiago, Chile	8th	4 × 400 m relay	3:15.69
2024	Ibero-American Championships	Cuiabá, Brazil	10th	1500 m	3:49.31
2025	South American Championships	Mar del Plata, Argentina	1st	1500 m	3:41.34
2025	World Championships	Tokyo, Japan	58th (h)	1500 m	3:57.42
2026	Ibero-American Championships	Lima, Peru	3rd	1500 m	3:42.27
2026	Pan American Championships	Medellín, Colombia	4th	1500 m	3:46.26
2026	South American Games	Santa Fe, Argentina	2nd	1500 m	3:47.16

^{1}Did not finish in the final

== Personal bests ==
Outdoor

- 800 metres – 1:48.19 (La Nucía 2022)
- 1500 metres – 3:38.92 (Budapest 2023)
- One mile – 4:08.27 (Coronel 2022)
- 3000 metres – 8:24.90 (Mar del Plata 2020)
- 10 kilometres – 29:48 (Mar del Plata 2024)
- Half marathon – 1:04:45 (Buenos Aires 2024)
