= 2025 South American Championships in Athletics =

54th South American Championships
- Dates: 25–27 April
- Host city: Mar del Plata, Argentina
- Venue: Estadio Justo Ernesto Román
- Level: Senior
- Events: 45 (22 men, 22 women, 1 mixed)
- Participation: 401 athletes from 13 nations
- Records set: 6 CR

2025 South American Championships in Athletics was the 54th edition of the biennial athletics competition between South American nations. The event was held in Mar del Plata, Argentina, from 25 to 27 April at the Estadio Justo Ernesto Román.

== Results ==
=== Men ===
Event	Gold		Silver		Bronze	
100 metres	Felipe Bardi (BRA)	9.99	Ronal Longa (COL)	10.04	Carlos Flórez (COL)	10.17
200 metres	César Almirón (PAR)	20.50	Ronal Longa (COL)	20.56	Arturo Deliser (PAN)	20.67
400 metres	Kelvis Padrino (VEN)	46.02	Elián Larregina (ARG)	46.17	Javier Gómez (VEN)	46.73
800 metres	Eduardo Moreira (BRA)	1:50.46	José Antonio Maita (VEN)	1:50.93	Marco Vilca (PER)	1:50.93
1500 metres	Diego Lacamoire (ARG)	3:41.34	Guilherme Kurtz (BRA)	3:42.79	Thiago André (BRA)	3:44.77
5000 metres	Carlos San Martín (COL)	13:54.34	Jânio Varjão (BRA)	13:55.88	Ignacio Velásquez (CHI)	13:59.81
10,000 metres	Ignacio Velásquez (CHI)	28:44.81	Pariona Nider (PER)	28:49.48	Luis Masabanda (ECU)	29:03.88
110 metres hurdles	Martín Sáenz (CHI)	13.51	Thiago Ornelas (BRA)	13.63	Marcos Herrera (ECU)	13.77
400 metres hurdles	Francisco Guilherme dos Reis Viana (BRA)	50.03	Caio Vinícius Silva (BRA)	51.27	Diego Courbis (CHI)	51.40
3000 metres steeplechase	Carlos San Martín (COL)	8:37.79	Didier Rodríguez (PAN)	8:41.31	Walace Caldas (BRA)	8:46.17
4 × 100 metres relay	Colombia; Jhonny Rentería; Carlos Palacios; Neiker Abello; Carlos Flórez; Pedro Agualimpia	39.58	Brazil; Vinícius Moraes; Felipe Bardi; Erik Cardoso; Vitor Hugo dos Santos; Rodrigo do Nascimento; Hygor Soares	39.62	Venezuela; Ángel Alvarado; Bryant Alamo; Alexis Nieves; David Vivas	39.84
4 × 400 metres relay	Brazil; Tiago da Silva; Lucas Carvalho; Jadson Soares; Elias Oliveira	3:07.40	Argentina; Agustín Pinti; Tomás Mirón; Bruno de Genaro; Elián Larregina	3:08.77	Venezuela; Javier Gómez; Axel Gómez; Kalin Zambrano; Kelvis Padrino	3:09.18
20 kilometres race walk (road)	Luis Henry Campos (PER)	1:21:26 CR	Jordy Jiménez (ECU)	1:24:06	Matheus Corrêa (BRA)	1:25:17
High jump	Thiago Moura (BRA)	2.16	Fernando Ferreira (BRA)	2.13	Sebastián Daners (URU)	2.10
Pole vault	Ricardo Montes de Oca (VEN)	5.40 =NR	Guillermo Correa (CHI)	5.40	Lucas Alisson (BRA)	5.35
Long jump	Emiliano Lasa (URU)	7.97	Emanuel Archibald (GUY)	7.76	José Luis Mandros (PER)	7.73
Triple jump	Almir dos Santos (BRA)	16.68	Elton Petronilho (BRA)	16.26	Leodan Torrealba (VEN)	16.22
Shot put	Willian Dourado (BRA)	20.65	Welington Morais (BRA)	20.28	Juan Manuel Arrieguez (ARG)	18.78
Discus throw	Claudio Romero (CHI)	64.13 CR	Wellinton da Cruz Filho (BRA)	62.09	Mauricio Ortega (COL)	61.91
Hammer throw	Joaquín Gómez (ARG)	77.69 CR NR	Gabriel Kehr (CHI)	76.90	Humberto Mansilla (CHI)	76.61
Javelin throw	Pedro Henrique Rodrigues (BRA)	77.92	Billy Julio (COL)	76.73	Lars Flaming (PAR)	76.60
Decathlon	José Fernando Ferreira (BRA)	7847	Gerson Izaguirre (VEN)	7273	Pedro de Oliveira (BRA)	7116

=== Women ===
Event	Gold		Silver		Bronze	
100 metres	Vitória Cristina Rosa (BRA)	11.21	Anahí Suárez (ECU)	11.28	María Ignacia Montt (CHI)	11.33
200 metres	Nicole Caicedo (ECU)	23.07	Anahí Suárez (ECU)	23.25	None awarded	
200 metres	Nicole Caicedo (ECU)	23.07	Vitória Cristina Rosa (BRA)	23.25	None awarded	
400 metres	Martina Weil (CHI)	51.14	Evelis Aguilar (COL)	51.26	Nicole Caicedo (ECU)	53.05
800 metres	Déborah Rodríguez (URU)	2:04.70	Mayara Leite (BRA)	2:05.33	Berdine Castillo (CHI)	2:05.89
1500 metres	Micaela Levaggi (ARG)	4:25.99	María Pía Fernández (URU)	4:28.27	July da Silva (BRA)	4:28.39
5000 metres	Sheyla Eulogio (PER)	15:51.27	Edymar Brea (VEN)	15:55.03	Daiana Ocampo (ARG)	15:57.15
10,000 metres	Nubia de Oliveira Silva (BRA)	34:06.56	Florencia Borelli (ARG)	34:08.01	Edymar Brea (VEN)	34:08.54
100 metres hurdles	Ketiley Batista (BRA)	13.22	María Alejandra Rocha (COL)	13.42	Vitoria Alves (BRA)	13.55
400 metres hurdles	Gianna Woodruff (PAN)	56.57	María Alejandra Rocha (COL)	57.48	Camille de Oliveira (BRA)	58.05
3000 metres steeplechase	Tatiane Raquel da Silva (BRA)	9:40.07	Micaela Levaggi (ARG)	9:42.09	Mirelle Leite (BRA)	10:13.35
4 × 100 metres relay	Brazil; Gabriela Mourão; Daniele Campigotto; Lorraine Martins; Vanessa dos Santos	44.35	Ecuador; Aimara Nazareno; Anahí Suárez; Nicole Caicedo; Jazmine Chala	45.04	Argentina; Belén Fritzsche; María Florencia Lamboglia; Valentina Napolitano; Guillermina Cossio	46.57
4 × 400 metres relay	Colombia; Nahomy Castro; Lina Licona; Paola Loboa; Evelis Aguilar	3:33.29	Brazil; Anny de Bassi; Tiffani Marinho; Jainy Barreto; Letícia Lima	3:34.28	Chile; Stephanie Saavedra; Antonia Ramírez; Violeta Arnaiz; Martina Weil	3:37.64
20 kilometres race walk (road)	Viviane Lyra (BRA)	1:28:30 CR	Gabriela de Sousa (BRA)	1:34:50	—N/a	
High jump	Hellen Tenorio (COL)	1.81	Arielly Monteiro (BRA)	1.78	Valdiléia Martins (BRA)	1.75
Pole vault	Juliana Campos (BRA)	4.30	Isabel de Quadros (BRA)	3.80	Aldana Garibaldi (ARG)	3.20
Long jump	Natalia Linares (COL)	6.81	Lissandra Campos (BRA)	6.48	Yuliana Angulo (ECU)	6.47
Triple jump	Gabriele dos Santos (BRA)	13.96	Regiclecia da Silva (BRA)	13.76	Natricia Hooper (GUY)	13.64
Shot put	Ivana Gallardo (CHI)	17.55	Ahymara Espinoza (VEN)	16.51	Ana Caroline Silva (BRA)	16.09
Discus throw ^{[a]}	Izabela da Silva (BRA)	62.87	Andressa de Morais (BRA)	60.16	Yerlin Mesa (COL)	55.69
Hammer throw	Rosa Rodríguez (VEN)	71.04	Ximena Zorrilla (PER)	67.52	Mariana García (CHI)	66.06
Javelin throw	Jucilene de Lima (BRA)	62.32 CR	Juleisy Angulo (ECU)	62.25 NR	Daniella Nisimura (BRA)	60.12
Heptathlon	Martha Araújo (COL)	6396 CR	Roberta dos Santos (BRA)	5553	Tamara de Sousa (BRA)	5525

=== Mixed ===
Event	Gold		Silver		Bronze	
4 × 400 metres relay	Brazil; Jadson Soares; Erica Barbosa; Tiago da Silva; Anny de Bassi	3:17.73	Colombia; Daniel Balanta; Paola Loboa; Luis Arrieta; Lina Licona	3:19.18	Argentina; Agustín Pinti; María Florencia Lamboglia; Elián Larregina; Noelia Martínez	3:23.12 NR

== Medal table ==
* Host nation (Argentina)

Rank	Nation	Gold	Silver	Bronze	Total
1	Brazil	20	19	13	52
2	Colombia	7	7	3	17
3	Chile	5	2	7	14
4	Argentina*	3	4	5	12
4	Venezuela	3	4	5	12
6	Peru	2	2	2	6
7	Uruguay	2	1	1	4
8	Ecuador	1	5	4	10
9	Panama	1	1	1	3
10	Paraguay	1	0	1	2
11	Guyana	0	1	1	2
Totals (11 entries)		45	46	43	134

== Participation ==
A record number of 401 athletes from all 13 member federations of Atletismo Sudamericano participated at the championships.

- Argentina (62)
- Bolivia (9)
- Brazil (87)
- Chile (42)
- Colombia (37)
- Ecuador (29)
- Guyana (8)
- Panama (7)
- Paraguay (35)
- Peru (27)
- Suriname (1)
- Uruguay (34)
- Venezuela (23)
