= Guilherme Orenhas =

Brazilian athlete (born 1998)

Personal information
- Born: Guilherme Rodrigues Santana Orenhas; 10 September 1998 (age 28)

Sport
- Sport: Athletics
- Event: Sprint

Achievements and titles
- Personal bests: 400m: 46.29 (2025); 800m: 1:45.01 (2025); 1500m: 3:46.45 (2022)
Medal record
Representing Brazil
Men's athletics
South American Indoor Championships
Silver medal – second place	2026 Cochabamba	800 m

Guilherme Rodrigues Santana Orenhas (born 10 September 1998) is a Brazilian middle-distance runner. He won the silver medal over 800 metres at the 2026 South American Indoor Championships.

== Biography ==
From Balneário Camboriú, Orenhas studied at Guarulhos University. He is a member of Fundação Municipal de Esportes (FME) and is coached by Diogo Gamboa.

Competing at the 2019 South American Championships in Athletics in Lima, Peru, Orenhas was a finalist in the 800 metres, placing fifth overall in 1:48.69. In 2023, he competed at the delayed 2021 Summer World University Games in Chengdu, China, where he qualified for the semi-finals of the 800 metres. Orenhas was a finalist over 800 metres at the 2025 South American Championships in Mar del Plata, Argentina, placing seventh.

Orenhas won the silver medal over 800 metres at the 2026 South American Indoor Championships in Cochabamba, Bolivia. He was subsequently called up to join the Brazilian team for the 800 m at the 2026 World Athletics Indoor Championships in Toruń, Poland in March 2026, where he ran an indoor personal best of 1:47.34 without advancing to the semi-finals.
