= Gabby Scott =

Puerto Rican athlete (born 1997)

Gabby Scott Puig
Personal information
- Born: Gabriella R. Scott Puig; 13 January 1997 (age 29) Wiesbaden, Germany

Sport
- Country: Puerto Rico (since 2018)
- Sport: Athletics
- Event(s): 400m, 400m hurdles

Achievements and titles
- Personal bests: 400m: 50.52 (Paris, 2024) NR; 400mH: 56.04 (Austin, 2019); Indoor; 400m: 52.53 (Karlsruhe, 2026) NR
Medal record
Women's athletics
Representing Puerto Rico
Pan American Championships
| Silver medal – second place | 2026 Medellín | 400 m |

Gabriella R. Scott Puig OLY (born 13 January 1997) is a German-born Puerto Rican track and field athlete who has won Puerto Rico national titles at both the 400 metres and 400m hurdles and holds Puerto Rico national titles at holds the national record over the 400m both outdoors and indoors.

== Early and personal life ==
Born in Germany, Scott was brought up in San Diego, California. Her mother, Rosa Puig was born and raised in Puerto Rico. Her father Gregg Scott was a professional basketball player. Scott, a Varsity 3-sport athlete, ran track, played volleyball and soccer (2014 CA CIF State Champions) at San Diego's Westview High School.

== NCAA ==
Scott competed collegiately for the University of Colorado Boulder. Scott set Colorado Buffaloes records in the 400 m (52.34) and 4x400 m relay (3:36.25 Welch, Johnson, Henderson, Scott) in 2019.

== Professional career ==
After leaving college in 2019, Scott turned professional and joined the Gary Evans coached team in Orlando, Florida.

Scott competes internationally for Puerto Rico. In 2022, Scott set a new national record for the 400 metres when she clocked 50.97 seconds in Geneva in June 2022. She qualified for the 2022 World Athletics Championships in Eugene, Oregon where she reached the semi-finals.

Scott ran at the 2023 World Athletics Championships in Budapest where she reached the semi-finals. She ran in the 400 meter event at the Paris Olympics, reaching the semi-finals.

Scott competed at the 2025 World Athletics Championships in Tokyo in the women's 400 metres.

Scott won the silver medal in the 400 metres final at the 2026 Pan American Championships in Athletics in Medellín.
