= List of Puerto Rican records in track and field =

The following are the national records in athletics in Puerto Rico maintained by its national athletics federation: Federación de Atletismo de Puerto Rico (FAPUR).

== Outdoor ==
Key to tables: Awaiting ratification Record not kept by FAPUR Not ratified or later rescinded by FAPUR

=== Men ===
Event	Record	Athlete	Date	Meet	Place	Ref.
100 m	9.95 (+0.7 m/s)	Eloy Benitez	24 May 2025	PURE Athletics Global Invitational	Clermont, United States	
200 m	19.76 (+2.0 m/s)	José Figueroa	5 August 2026	Central American and Caribbean Games	Santo Domingo, Dominican Republic	
400 m	44.49	José Figueroa	2 May 2026	LAI Championships	Mayagüez, Puerto Rico	
600 m	1:13.97	Ryan Sánchez	18 March 2023	Spring Break Classic	Carolina, Puerto Rico	
800 m	1:43.83	Wesley Vázquez	24 August 2019	Diamond League	Paris, France	
1500 m	3:35.63	Rob Napolitano	3 June 2021	Stumptown Twilight Meet	Portland, United States	
Mile	3:56.4 h (Note: outdoor best; indoor mark ratified as absolute record)	Antonio Colon	16 August 1975		Ponce, Puerto Rico	
Mile (road)	4:02.0 h	Rob Napolitano	23 May 2021	adidas Boost Boston Games	Boston, United States	
Mile (road)	3:57.3 h a	Rob Napolitano	8 September 2019	New Balance Fifth Avenue Mile	New York, United States	
3000 m	7:53.5 h (Note: Outdoor best, indoor mark ratified as absolute record.)	Antonio Colón	July 12, 1976		Montreal, Canada	
5000 m	13:31.69	Joseph Rosa	June 13, 2014		Eugene, United States	
5 km (road)	13:33	Victor Ortiz Rivera	31 December 2024	Cursa dels Nassos	Barcelona, Spain	
10,000 m	28:23.26	Héctor Pagán	16 April 2026	Bryan Clay Invitational	Azusa, United States	
10 km (road)	28:13	Victor Ortiz Rivera	22 Febrero 2026	10K Facsa Castellón	Castellón de la Plana, Spain	
15 km (road)	45:19	Carlos Quinones	February 17, 1990		Tampa, United States	
Half marathon	1:01:55	Héctor Pagán	21 March 2026	Project 13.1	Valley Cottage, United States	
Marathon	2:12:43	Jorge González	August 28, 1983	Pan American Games	Caracas, Venezuela	
110 m hurdles	13.41 (+1.1 m/s)	William Barnes	April 30, 2016	Drake Relays	Des Moines, United States	
300 m hurdles	37.22	Michael Olasio	1 April 2023	Felix Sánchez Classic	Santo Domingo, Dominican Republic	
400 m hurdles	47.72	Javier Culson	May 8, 2010	Ponce Grand Prix	Ponce, Puerto Rico	
3000 m steeplechase	8:22.31	Victor Ortiz Rivera	12 July 2025	Sunset Tour	Los Angeles, United States	
High jump	2.29 m	David Adley Smith II	April 23, 2016	War Eagle Invitational	Auburn, United States	
High jump	2.29 m	Luis Castro	May 28, 2016		Sinn, Germany	
Pole vault	5.65 m	Edgar Díaz	May 14, 1998		Abilene, Texas, United States	
Long jump	8.19 m A NWI	Elmer Williams	August 11, 1989		Bogotá, Colombia	
Triple jump	17.10 m (+1.4 m/s)	Allen Simms	March 17, 2007		Carolina, Puerto Rico	
Shot put	20.22 m	Chris Merced	May 28, 2000		Irvine, United States	
Discus throw	56.23 m	Gabriel Torres	April 14, 2012	USA Invitational	Auburn, United States	
Hammer throw	75.98 m	Jerome Vega	15 March 2024	18th Spring Break Classic	Carolina, Puerto Rico	
Javelin throw	76.07 m	Caleb Nieves	May 28, 2016	NCAA Division II Championships	Bradenton, United States	
Decathlon	8784 pts	Ayden Owens-Delerme	20–21 September 2025	World Championships	Tokyo, Japan	
Decathlon	100m (wind) / Long jump (wind) / Shot put / High jump / 400m / 110m H (wind) / Discus / Pole vault / Javelin / 1500m; 10.31 (+0.2 m/s) / 7.32 m (+0.4 m/s) / 15.55 m / 1.96 m / 46.46 / 13.65 (+1.1 m/s) / 46.12 m / 5.10 m / 58.79 m / 4:17.91					
20 km walk (road)	1:24:08	José Meléndez	10 February 2019	Oceania Race Walking Championships	Adelaide, Australia	
30 km walk (road)	2:18:03	Luis Colon	October 25, 2015		New York City, United States	
50 km walk (road)	4:16:00	Luis A. Lopez	November 29, 2014		Veracruz, Mexico	
4 × 100 m relay	38.12	Puerto Rico; Eloy Benitez; José Figueroa; Adrian Canales; Pedro Rivas	6 August 2026	CAC Games	Santo Domingo, Dominican Republic	
4 × 400 m relay	3:00.75	Puerto Rico; José Figueroa; Pedro Rivas; Alejandro Rosado; Jarell Cruz	7 August 2026	CAC Games	Santo Domingo, Dominican Republic	
4 × 800 m relay	7:34.03	Miguel Rodríguez; Abdiel Cartagena; David Montánez; Héctor Font	March 26, 1985		San Juan, Puerto Rico	

=== Women ===
Event	Record	Athlete	Date	Meet	Place	Ref.	Video
100 m	11.09 (+0.7 m/s)	Gladymar Torres	22 August 2026	Felix Sanchez Classic	Santo Domingo, Dominican Republic		
200 m	22.23 A (+1.8 m/s)	Carol Rodríguez	May 26, 2006		Provo, United States		
400 m	50.52	Gabby Scott	6 August 2024	Olympic Games	Paris, France		
600 m	1:26.39	Gabby Scott	5 April 2025	Miramar Invitational	Miramar, United States		
800 m	2:01.31	Angelita Lind	July 25, 1984		Walnut, United States		
1500 m	4:09.92	Beverly Ramos	July 1, 2011	Harry Jerome Classic	Burnaby, Canada		
3000 m	8:57.68	Beverly Ramos	May 17, 2014	Ponce Grand Prix	Ponce, Puerto Rico		
5000 m	15:46.65	Beverly Ramos	April 4, 2014	Stanford Invitational	Stanford, United States		
5 km (road)	15:32	Alondra Negron	31 December 2025	Cursa dels Nassos	Barcelona, Spain		
10,000 m	32:36.03	Beverly Ramos	May 5, 2017	Payton Jordan Invitational	Stanford, United States		
10 km (road)	32:26 Mx	Alondra Negrón	18 April 2026	10 km en Ruta Villa de Laredo	Laredo, Spain		
15 km (road)	51:44+	Beverly Ramos	March 20, 2016	New York City Half Marathon	New York City, United States		
20 km (road)	1:08:24+	Beverly Ramos	March 20, 2016	New York City Half Marathon	New York City, United States		
Half marathon	1:12:02	Beverly Ramos	25 September 2021	Trials of Miles Project 13.1 Half Marathon	Valley Cottage, United States		
25 km (road)	1:28:49+	Beverly Ramos	18 July 2022	World Championships	Eugene, United States		
30 km (road)	1:46:45+	Beverly Ramos	18 July 2022	World Championships	Eugene, United States		
Marathon	2:31:10	Beverly Ramos	18 July 2022	World Championships	Eugene, United States		
100 m hurdles	12.26 (−0.2 m/s)	Jasmine Camacho-Quinn	1 August 2021	Olympic Games	Tokyo, Japan		
400 m hurdles	55.03	Yvonne Harrison	June 29, 2003		Poznań, Poland		
2000 m steeplechase	6:18.21	Alondra Negrón	18 May 2025	Internationales Läufermeeting	Pliezhausen, Germany		
3000 m steeplechase	9:39.33	Beverly Ramos	July 10, 2012	Meeting International	Sotteville-lès-Rouen, France		
High jump	1.83 m	Laura Agront	June 2, 1984		San Juan, Puerto Rico		
High jump	1.83 m A	Alysbeth Félix	June 25, 2016	Gran Prix Internacional "Valle Oro Puro"	Cali, Colombia		
Pole vault	4.50 m	Diamara Planell	April 16, 2016	Mt. SAC Relays	Norwalk, United States		
Long jump	6.96 m A	Madeline de Jesús	July 24, 1988		Mexico City, Mexico		
Triple jump	13.53 m (+1.7 m/s)	Tanasia Lea	16 June 2019	CVEATC HP #2	Chula Vista, United States		
Shot put	16.40 m	Kimberly Barrett-Losada	March 19, 2011	Miami Hurricane Invitational	Coral Gables, United States		
Discus throw	55.19 m	Brittany Borrero	May 21, 2011	Puerto Rican Championships	Ponce, Puerto Rico		
Discus throw	55.53 m	Brittany Borrero	May 9, 2009				
Hammer throw	66.57 m	Amarilys Alméstica	July 1, 2006		Ottawa, Canada		
Javelin throw	60.37 m	Coralys Ortíz	February 27, 2016		Gurabo, Puerto Rico		
Heptathlon	6136 pts	Alysbeth Felix	5–6 August 2026	CAC Games	Santo Domingo, Dominican Republic		
Heptathlon	100m H (wind) / High jump / Shot put / 200m (wind) / Long jump (wind) / Javelin / 800m; 13.47 (+2.0 m/s) / 1.70 m / 11.79 m / 24.30 (±0.0 m/s) / 6.62 m (+1.2 m/s) / 41.87 m / 2:16.03						
10,000 m walk (track)	46:22.71	Rachelle De Orbeta	19 July 2016	World Junior Championships	Bydgoszcz, Poland		
10 km walk (road)	44:50	Rachelle De Orbeta	10 February 2019	Oceania Race Walking Championships	Adelaide, Australia		
20,000 m walk (track)	1:36:15.88	Rachell De Orbeta	16 August 2025	2025 Championships	Freeport, Bahamas		
20 km walk (road)	1:33:06	Rachelle de Orbeta	2 April 2022		Poděbrady, Czech Republic		
50 km walk (road)							
4 × 100 m relay	43.41	Puerto Rico; Adanelys Rodríguez; Gladymar Torres; Legna Echevarria; Frances Colon	6 August 2026	CAC Games	Santo Domingo, Dominican Republic		
4 × 400 m relay	3:29.30	Puerto Rico; Andrea Rivera; Sarai Javier; Grace Claxton; Gabby Scott	7 August 2026	CAC Games	Santo Domingo, Dominican Republic		

=== Mixed ===
Event	Record	Athlete	Date	Meet	Place	Ref.
4 × 400 m relay	3:11.88	Puerto Rico; José Figueroa; Andrea Rivera; Jarell Cruz; Gabby Scott	3 August 2026	CAC Games	Santo Domingo, Dominican Republic	

== Indoor ==
=== Men ===
Event	Record	Athlete	Date	Meet	Place	Ref.
55 m	6.17	Luis Morales	21 February 1986	Sunkist Invitational	Inglewood, United States	
60 m	6.49	Eloy Benitez	21 March 2025	World Championships	Nanjing, China	
200 m	20.81	Marquis Holston	March 9, 2012	NCAA Division I Championships	Nampa, United States	
300 m	33.27	Marquis Holston	January 21, 2011	Hokie Invitational	Blacksburg, United States	
400 m	46.34 A	José Figueroa	3 February 2024	New Mexico Collegiate Classic	Albuquerque, United States	
600 m	1:15.22	Niko Schultz	27 February 2026	Big Ten Conference Championships	Indianapolis, United States	
800 m	1:46.20	Andrés Arroyo	February 27, 2016	SEC Championships	Fayetteville, United States	
1000 m	2:24.49	Armando del Valle	January 23, 2010	Adidas Classic	Lincoln, United States	
1500 m	3:43.14+	Alfredo Santana	February 4, 2018	Millrose Games	New York City, United States	
Mile	3:54.12	Rob Napolitano	10 February 2024	Boston University David Hemery Valentine Invitational	Boston, United States	
3000 m	7:51.43	Victor Ortiz Rivera	7 February 2024	Meeting Ciudad de Valencia	Valencia, Spain	
5000 m	13:53.80	Alfredo Santana	February 12, 2022	BU David Hemery Valentine Invitational	Boston, United States	
5000 m	13:44.85 OT	Joe Rosa	February 28, 2014		Seattle, United States	
55 m hurdles	7.27	Jamele Mason	January 21, 2012	Texas Tech Indoor Open #2	Lubbock, United States	
60 m hurdles	7.71 A	Héctor Cotto	February 7, 2014	Mountain T Invitational	Flagstaff, United States	
60 m hurdles	7.71 A	Ayden Owens-Delerme	4 February 2023	New Mexico Collegiate Classic	Albuquerque, United States	
High jump	2.26 m	Luis Joel Castro	23 January 2019	Kölner Hochsprung Meeting	Cologne, Germany	
High jump	2.26 m	Luis Joel Castro	26 January 2019		Hustopeče, Czech Republic	
Pole vault	5.50 m	Brandon Estrada	March 6, 2010	UW Last Chance Qualifier	Seattle, United States	
Long jump	8.12 m	Mike Francis	March 6, 1992		Manhattan, United States	
Triple jump	16.82 m	Allen Simms	March 11, 2006	World Championships	Moscow, Russia	
Shot put	19.03 m	Devon Patterson	February 13, 2016	Spire Institute	Geneva, United States	
Weight throw	20.70 m	Wilfredo de Jesús	January 5, 2013	Army Crowell Open	West Point, United States	
Heptathlon	6518 pts A	Ayden Owens-Delerme	10–11 March 2023	NCAA Division I Championships	Albuquerque, United States	
Heptathlon	60m / Long jump / Shot put / High jump / 60m H / Pole vault / 1000m; 6.77 / 7.82 m / 15.27 m / 2.03 m / 7.73 / 4.96 m / 2:33.14					
5000 m walk						
4 × 400 m relay						

=== Women ===
Event	Record	Athlete	Date	Meet	Place	Ref.
60 m	7.18 A	Gladymar Torres	26 February 2026	Meeting Sudamericano Jurgen Berodt	Cochabamba, Bolivia	
200 m	22.54	Jasmine Camacho-Quinn	12 February 2022	American Track League	Louisville, United States	
300 m	36.52	Jasmine Camacho-Quinn	28 January 2022	South Carolina Invitational	Columbia, United States	
400 m	52.53	Gabby Scott	8 February 2026	Indoor Meeting Karlsruhe	Karlsruhe, Germany	
400 m	52.34 OT	Gabby Scott	23 February 2019		Seattle, United States	
500 m	1:11.08	Alethia Marrero	12 December 2014	Hoosier Open	Bloomington, United States	
600 m	1:28.30	Gabby Scott	31 January 2021	American Track League #2	Fayetteville, United States	
800 m	2:05.52	Lysaira Del Valle	March 12, 2005	NCAA Division I Championships	Fayetteville, United States	
800 m	2:04.43 OT	Lysaira Del Valle	March 5, 2005		Ames, United States	
1500 m	4:42.02 y	Liliani Mendez	February 28, 2009		College Station, United States	
Mile	4:38.44	Alondra Negron	10 February 2023	David Hemery Valentine Invitational	Boston, United States	
3000 m	9:16.23	Beverly Ramos	March 13, 2010	NCAA Division I Championships	Fayetteville, United States	
3000 m	9:14.62 OT	Beverly Ramos	March 5, 2010	Notre Dame Alex Wilson Invitational	Notre Dame, United States	
5000 m	16:08.60	Beverly Ramos	March 12, 2010	NCAA Division I Championships	Fayetteville, United States	
60 m hurdles	7.95	Jasmine Camacho-Quinn	9 February 2018	Tiger Paw Invitational	Clemson, United States	
High jump	1.82 m	Courteney Campbell	12 February 2022	Rutgers Open	New York City, United States	
Pole vault	4.45 m	Diamara Planell	March 12, 2016	NCAA Division I Championships	Birmingham, United States	
Long jump	6.29 m	Jasmine Simmons	January 22, 2016	Gotham Cup	Staten Island, United States	
Long jump	6.29 m (Note: by official result source: 6.48m by World Athletics source)	Jasmine Simmons	February 5, 2016	Armory Invitational	New York City, United States	
Triple jump	13.22 m	Tanasia Lea	22 February 2019		New York City, United States	
Shot put	15.26 m (Note: not recognised by World Athletics)	Sylvia Galarza	January 2, 2008 (Note: 1 February 2008 by other sources)		New York City, United States	
Weight throw	18.87 m	Rachel Peña	February 22, 2014		Lewisburg, United States	
Pentathlon						
Pentathlon	60m H / High jump / Shot put / Long jump / 800m					
3000 m walk						
4 × 400 m relay						
