= 2022 South American Under-23 Championships in Athletics – Results =

These are the full results of the 2022 South American Under-23 Championships in Athletics which took place between September 29 and October 1 at Estádio do Centro Nacional de Treinamento de Atletismo in Cascavel, Brazil.

== Men's results ==
=== 100 meters ===
Heats – September 29
Wind:
Heat 1: +2.4 m/s, Heat 2: +2.4 m/s

Rank	Heat	Name	Nationality	Time	Notes
1	1	Franco Florio	Argentina	10.20	Q
2	1	Erik Cardoso	Brazil	10.28	Q
3	2	Lucas da Silva	Brazil	10.40	Q
4	2	Ronal Longa	Colombia	10.44	Q
5	1	Carlos Flórez	Colombia	10.48	Q
6	1	Juan Pedro Álvarez	Uruguay	10.57	q
7	1	Luis Angulo	Peru	10.60	q
8	1	Katriel Angulo	Ecuador	10.64	
9	2	Anderson Marquinez	Ecuador	10.65	Q
10	1	Gustavo Mongelos	Paraguay	10.66	
11	2	Aron Earl	Peru	10.68	
12	2	Adrian Nicolari	Uruguay	10.69	
13	2	Mateo Vargas	Paraguay	10.69	
14	2	Alejo Pafundi	Argentina	10.74	
15	2	Julian Vargas	Bolivia	11.08	

Final – September 29

Wind: +0.5 m/s

Rank	Lane	Name	Nationality	Time	Notes
1st place, gold medalist(s)	3	Erik Cardoso	Brazil	10.08	CR, SB
2nd place, silver medalist(s)	5	Franco Florio	Argentina	10.11	NR
3rd place, bronze medalist(s)	4	Ronal Longa	Colombia	10.30	
4	6	Lucas da Silva	Brazil	10.31	
5	7	Carlos Flórez	Colombia	10.52	
6	1	Luis Angulo	Peru	10.56	
7	2	Juan Pedro Álvarez	Uruguay	10.60	
8	8	Anderson Marquinez	Ecuador	10.69	

=== 200 meters ===
Heats – September 30
Wind:
Heat 1: +2.7 m/s, Heat 2: +1.2 m/s

Rank	Heat	Name	Nationality	Time	Notes
1	1	Renan Gallina	Brazil	20.16	Q
2	2	Lucas da Silva	Brazil	20.49	Q, CR
3	1	Anderson Marquinez	Ecuador	21.00	Q
4	2	Juan Ignacio Ciampitti	Argentina	21.01	Q
5	1	Óscar Baltán	Colombia	21.14	Q
6	2	Steeven Salas	Ecuador	21.15	Q
7	1	Juan Pedro Álvarez	Uruguay	21.30	q
7	2	Neiker Abello	Colombia	21.30	q
9	1	Agustín Pinti	Argentina	21.42	
10	1	Mateo Vargas	Paraguay	21.80	
11	1	Julian Vargas	Bolivia	22.17	
12	2	Adrian Nicolari	Uruguay	22.68	
	2	César Almirón	Paraguay	DNF	

Final – October 1

Wind: +1.1 m/s

Rank	Lane	Name	Nationality	Time	Notes
1st place, gold medalist(s)	3	Renan Gallina	Brazil	20.15	CR
2nd place, silver medalist(s)	5	Lucas da Silva	Brazil	20.42	
3rd place, bronze medalist(s)	4	Anderson Marquinez	Ecuador	20.88	
4	6	Juan Ignacio Ciampitti	Argentina	20.91	
5	7	Óscar Baltán	Colombia	21.08	
6	8	Steeven Salas	Ecuador	21.31	
7	2	Juan Pedro Álvarez	Uruguay	21.39	
8	1	Neiker Abello	Colombia	21.72	

=== 400 meters ===
Heats – September 30

Rank	Heat	Name	Nationality	Time	Notes
1	1	Matias Falchetti	Argentina	47.81	Q
2	1	Alan Minda	Ecuador	48.00	Q
3	2	Elián Larregina	Argentina	48.69	Q
4	2	Lenin Sánchez	Ecuador	48.74	Q
5	1	Douglas da Silva	Brazil	48.92	Q
6	2	Lucas Vilar	Brazil	49.24	Q
7	2	Marcos González	Paraguay	49.91	q
8	1	Jhumiler Sánchez	Paraguay	50.01	q
	1	Allan Cortesia	Venezuela	DQ	R17.3.2

Final – September 30

Rank	Lane	Name	Nationality	Time	Notes
1st place, gold medalist(s)	4	Elián Larregina	Argentina	45.53	
2nd place, silver medalist(s)	7	Douglas da Silva	Brazil	46.59	
3rd place, bronze medalist(s)	8	Lucas Vilar	Brazil	46.77	
4	6	Matias Falchetti	Argentina	47.03	
5	5	Lenin Sánchez	Ecuador	47.68	
6	3	Alan Minda	Ecuador	48.00	
7	2	Marcos González	Paraguay	48.83	
8	1	Jhumiler Sánchez	Paraguay	49.19	

=== 800 meters ===
September 29

Rank	Name	Nationality	Time	Notes
1st place, gold medalist(s)	Eduardo Moreira	Brazil	1:48.15	
2nd place, silver medalist(s)	Leonardo de Jesus	Brazil	1:48.71	
3rd place, bronze medalist(s)	Marco Vilca	Peru	1:49.69	
4	Pedro Emmert	Argentina	1:50.13	
5	Fernando Arévalo	Chile	1:52.86	
6	Daniel Taramuel	Ecuador	1:53.30	
7	José Chourio	Venezuela	1:54.79	
8	Omar Sotomayor	Bolivia	1:55.43	
9	Ramiro Ulunque	Bolivia	1:56.51	
10	José Ramón Cabrera	Paraguay	1:57.96	
11	Paul Wood	Paraguay	1:58.78	
	Sebastián López	Venezuela	DNF	

=== 1500 meters ===
October 1

Rank	Name	Nationality	Time	Notes
1st place, gold medalist(s)	Sebastián López	Venezuela	3:44.56	
2nd place, silver medalist(s)	Joaquin Campos	Chile	3:45.80	
3rd place, bronze medalist(s)	Jânio Varjão	Brazil	3:46.57	
4	Leandro Pérez	Argentina	3:46.60	
5	Eduardo Moreira	Brazil	3:47.38	
6	Lucas Jiménez	Ecuador	3:50.80	
7	Daniel Taramuel	Ecuador	3:51.51	
8	Gabriel Guzman	Venezuela	3:52.83	
9	Ericky dos Santos	Paraguay	3:55.12	
10	Brayan Jara	Chile	4:00.22	

=== 5000 meters ===
September 29

Rank	Name	Nationality	Time	Notes
1st place, gold medalist(s)	David Ninavia	Bolivia	14:39.91	
2nd place, silver medalist(s)	Valentín Soca	Uruguay	14:41.06	
3rd place, bronze medalist(s)	Julio Palomino	Peru	14:42.83	
4	Frank Lujan	Peru	14:53.71	
5	Lucas Jiménez	Ecuador	15:01.17	
6	Gabriel Guzman	Venezuela	15:02.09	
7	Peterson Ribeiro	Brazil	15:09.18	
8	Dennis Fernández	Chile	15:56.33	
9	Marcos Ramírez	Paraguay	16:45.58	
	Vinícius Alves	Brazil	DNF	

=== 10,000 meters ===
October 1

Rank	Name	Nationality	Time	Notes
1st place, gold medalist(s)	David Ninavia	Bolivia	30:05.08	
2nd place, silver medalist(s)	Frank Lujan	Peru	30:34.54	
3rd place, bronze medalist(s)	Valentín Soca	Uruguay	30:44.32	
4	Julio Chacón	Peru	30:49.53	
5	Peterson Ribeiro	Brazil	30:57.49	
6	Vitor da Silva	Brazil	32:46.18	
7	Rodrigo Roberts	Argentina	33:09.10	

=== 110 meters hurdles ===
October 1
Wind: +0.8 m/s

Rank	Lane	Name	Nationality	Time	Notes
1st place, gold medalist(s)	3	Adrian Vieira	Brazil	13.74	PB
2nd place, silver medalist(s)	6	Martín Sáenz	Chile	13.91	
3rd place, bronze medalist(s)	5	Fabricio Pereira	Brazil	13.93	
4	7	Julian Berca	Argentina	14.46	
5	4	Paolo Crose	Peru	14.65	

=== 400 meters hurdles ===
September 29

Rank	Lane	Name	Nationality	Time	Notes
1st place, gold medalist(s)	3	Bruno de Genaro	Argentina	50.55	
2nd place, silver medalist(s)	4	Matheus da Silva	Brazil	50.87	
3rd place, bronze medalist(s)	1	Egbert Espinoza	Venezuela	51.68	
4	6	Caio Silva	Brazil	51.96	
5	5	César Parra	Venezuela	53.53	
6	7	Luis Elespuru	Peru	54.85	
7	8	Mathias Paredes	Paraguay	56.03	
8	2	Osvaldo Mendez	Paraguay	57.35	

=== 3000 meters steeplechase ===
September 29

Rank	Name	Nationality	Time	Notes
1st place, gold medalist(s)	Julio Palomino	Peru	9:18.90	
2nd place, silver medalist(s)	Matheus Borges	Brazil	9:29.01	
3rd place, bronze medalist(s)	Natan Nepomuceno	Brazil	9:37.00	
4	Brian Codoceo	Chile	9:49.18	
5	Linkoyan Ancapi	Chile	9:53.01	

=== 4 × 100 meters relay ===
September 30

Rank	Lane	Nation	Competitors	Time	Notes
1st place, gold medalist(s)	6	Colombia	Neiker Abello, Carlos Flórez, Óscar Baltán, Ronal Longa	39.59	NU23R
2nd place, silver medalist(s)	8	Brazil	Lucas Antunes, Renan Gallina, Lucas da Silva, Erik Cardoso	39.61	
3rd place, bronze medalist(s)	5	Argentina	Alejo Pafundi, Matías Falchetti, Juan Ignacio Ciampitti, Franco Florio	39.99	
4	4	Ecuador	Alan Minda, Steeven Salas, Katriel Angulo, Anderson Marquinez	40.53	
5	3	Paraguay	Gustavo Mongelos, Mateo Vargas, Anhuar Duarte, César Almirón	40.69	
6	7	Peru	Rodrigo Cornejo, Ismael Arevalo, Luis Angulo, Aron Earl	40.73	

=== 4 × 400 meters relay ===
October 1

Rank	Lane	Nation	Competitors	Time	Notes
1st place, gold medalist(s)	8	Argentina	Pedro Emmert, Bruno de Genaro, Matias Falchetti, Elián Larregina	3:04.39	CR, NR
2nd place, silver medalist(s)	3	Brazil	Elias dos Santos, Lucas Vilar, Douglas da Silva, Marcos Morães	3:05.44	
3rd place, bronze medalist(s)	6	Ecuador	Lenin Sánchez, Alan Minda, Anderson Marquinez, Steeven Salas	3:09.51	
4	5	Venezuela	César Parra, Sebastián López, José Chourio, Egbert Espinoza	3:15.69	
5	7	Paraguay	Jhumiler Sánchez, Paul Wood, Albaro Ramírez, Marcos González	3:17.31	
6	4	Peru	Luis Elespuru, Marco Vilca, Ismael Arevalo, Rodrigo Cornejo	3:18.74	

=== 20,000 meters walk ===
September 30

Rank	Name	Nationality	Time	Notes
1st place, gold medalist(s)	Paulo Ribeiro	Brazil	1:29:53	
2nd place, silver medalist(s)	Sebastián Giuliani	Argentina	1:37:11	
3rd place, bronze medalist(s)	Heron Miranda	Brazil	1:45:38	
	Óscar Patín	Ecuador	DQ	

=== High jump ===
September 29

Rank	Name	Nationality	1.80	1.85	1.90	1.93	1.96	1.99	2.01	2.03	2.05	2.07	2.09	2.13	2.15	2.17	Result	Notes
1st place, gold medalist(s)	Elton Petronilho	Brazil	–	–	–	–	–	xo	–	–	o	o	xo	o	xxo	xxx	2.15	
2nd place, silver medalist(s)	Pedro Alamos	Chile	–	–	–	–	–	–	–	–	xo	–	o	xxo	xxo	xxx	2.15	
3rd place, bronze medalist(s)	Nicolas Numair	Chile	–	–	–	–	–	o	–	–	o	–	xo	o	xxx		2.13	
4	Jimmy Lopes	Brazil	–	–	–	–	–	xxo	–	o	o	o	xxx				2.07	
5	Sebastián Daners	Uruguay	–	o	–	o	–	xo	o	xxx							2.01	
6	Santiago Zezular	Argentina	–	o	xo	–	o	o	–	xxx							1.99	
7	José André Camacho	Bolivia	o	o	xxo	xo	xxo	xxx									1.96	
8	Sebastián Moringo	Paraguay	o	xo	xxx												1.85	
	André Bergen	Paraguay	xxx														NM	

=== Pole vault ===
September 29

Rank	Name	Nationality	4.20	4.40	4.50	4.60	4.65	4.70	4.75	4.80	4.85	4.90	5.00	5.10	5.30	Result	Notes
1st place, gold medalist(s)	Dyander Pacho	Ecuador	–	–	–	–	–	o	–	o	–	o	o	o	xxx	5.10	
2nd place, silver medalist(s)	Guillermo Correa	Chile	–	–	–	xxo	–	–	–	xx–	–	o	o	xxx		5.00	
3rd place, bronze medalist(s)	Andreas Kreiss	Brazil	o	o	xxo	xxo	o	x–	o	o	xxx					4.80	
4	Aurelio Leite	Brazil	–	o	xxo	o	xo	o	o	xx–	x					4.75	
	Austin Ramos	Ecuador	–	–	–	xxx										NM	

=== Long jump ===
September 30

Rank	Name	Nationality	#1	#2	#3	#4	#5	#6	Result	Notes
1st place, gold medalist(s)	Jhon Berrío	Colombia	7.70w	7.43	7.39	7.16	7.07	–	7.70w	
2nd place, silver medalist(s)	Gabriel Luiz Boza	Brazil	7.51	7.57	x	7.60w	x	7.57w	7.60w	
3rd place, bronze medalist(s)	Matias González	Chile	7.11w	7.02w	7.36	7.16w	7.47w	7.32w	7.47w	
4	Victor Gabriel Ramos	Brazil	7.08w	7.07	7.31w	7.25	7.34w	6.93w	7.34w	
5	Adrian Alvarado	Panama	6.97	7.16w	7.09w	7.10	7.24	7.07w	7.24	
6	Ezequiel Bustamante	Argentina	x	x	7.14	6.84w	x	6.73w	7.14	
7	Bruno Yoset	Uruguay	6.97w	5.25	6.99w	7.02w	6.94	x	7.02w	
8	Marcos Ponce	Ecuador	x	x	6.83	x	4.33	x	6.83	
9	Lars Flaming	Paraguay	5.54w	5.22	5.33				5.54w	

=== Triple jump ===
October 1

Rank	Name	Nationality	#1	#2	#3	#4	#5	#6	Result	Notes
1st place, gold medalist(s)	Elton Petronilho	Brazil	16.09	16.37	x	x	16.12	x	16.37	
2nd place, silver medalist(s)	Geiner Moreno	Colombia	16.02	16.37	x	x	x	15.89	16.37	
3rd place, bronze medalist(s)	Felipe da Silva	Brazil	16.07	16.16	x	x	x	x	16.16	
4	Luis Reyes	Chile	15.69	15.95	x	x	x	16.15	16.15	
5	Frixon Chila	Ecuador	15.04	x	15.88	x	15.79	x	15.88	
6	Zeudin Carvajal	Venezuela	x	14.59	14.49	14.47	14.39	14.68	14.68	

=== Shot put ===
September 30

Rank	Name	Nationality	#1	#2	#3	#4	#5	#6	Result	Notes
1st place, gold medalist(s)	Nazareno Sasia	Argentina	19.33	19.29	x	19.58	19.20	19.76	19.76	
2nd place, silver medalist(s)	Marcelo Lopes	Brazil	17.23	17.41	16.86	17.42	17.44	x	17.44	
3rd place, bronze medalist(s)	Juan Manuel Arrieguez	Argentina	16.49	16.90	x	16.65	17.14	17.21	17.21	
4	Arthur de Sousa	Brazil	16.53	16.50	x	16.51	x	x	16.53	

=== Discus throw ===
September 30

Rank	Name	Nationality	#1	#2	#3	#4	#5	#6	Result	Notes
1st place, gold medalist(s)	Nazareno Sasia	Argentina	54.47	x	54.16	56.25	51.19	57.26	57.26	
2nd place, silver medalist(s)	Luis Fabio Rodrigues	Brazil	x	45.51	50.47	x	50.10	50.77	50.77	
3rd place, bronze medalist(s)	Mateus Torres	Brazil	46.94	49.25	46.82	45.52	47.02	45.86	49.25	
4	Lars Flaming	Paraguay	35.31	37.38	x	x	38.78	x	38.78	

=== Hammer throw ===
September 29

Rank	Name	Nationality	#1	#2	#3	#4	#5	#6	Result	Notes
1st place, gold medalist(s)	Daniel Leal	Chile	62.14	64.46	x	61.78	61.61	62.24	64.46	
2nd place, silver medalist(s)	Sebastián Tommasi	Argentina	58.72	62.00	60.10	x	x	x	62.00	
3rd place, bronze medalist(s)	Tomás Olivera	Argentina	56.72	x	61.75	x	x	59.13	61.75	
4	Jean Carlos Ortíz	Colombia	58.54	59.55	x	55.61	58.29	59.73	59.73	
5	João Carlos de Souza	Brazil	52.33	57.26	54.79	54.21	53.63	x	57.26	
6	Bryan de Barrios	Brazil	x	53.13	56.24	x	x	x	56.24	
7	Emerson Rujel	Peru	x	x	56.00	55.58	55.60	x	56.00	
8	Christopher Ambato	Ecuador	52.64	50.67	54.16	54.08	x	x	54.16	
9	Gabriel Patino	Peru	51.61	50.38	x				51.61	

=== Javelin throw ===
October 1

Rank	Name	Nationality	#1	#2	#3	#4	#5	#6	Result	Notes
1st place, gold medalist(s)	Luiz Maurício da Silva	Brazil	71.41	71.52	71.09	78.92	x	72.97	78.92	
2nd place, silver medalist(s)	Antonio Ortiz	Paraguay	64.29	x	70.63	65.67	66.88	73.15	73.15	
3rd place, bronze medalist(s)	Jean Marcos Mairongo	Ecuador	70.73	x	69.28	x	68.15	x	70.73	
4	Lautaro Techera	Uruguay	62.97	68.07	65.35	69.96	66.38	68.47	69.96	
5	Wilian Torres	Ecuador	65.79	60.96	66.40	66.71	59.08	66.54	66.71	
6	Guilherme Soares	Brazil	63.05	65.14	59.90	61.39	61.67	61.00	65.14	
7	Lautaro Amarilla	Argentina	60.38	x	63.65	59.34	61.75	x	63.65	
8	Eynar Arancibia	Bolivia	61.28	61.32	x	55.33	x	x	61.32	
9	Carlos Rospigliosi	Peru	60.42	x	60.25				60.42	
10	Lars Flaming	Paraguay	57.46	54.52	x				57.46	

=== Decathlon ===
September 29–30

The highest mark recorded in each event is highlighted in yellow

Rank	Athlete	Nationality	100m	LJ	SP	HJ	400m	110m H	DT	PV	JT	1500m	Points	Notes
1st place, gold medalist(s)	Julio Angulo	Colombia	11.01	6.87	12.97	1.98	49.67	14.62w	43.12	3.70	48.20	5:05.83	7169	
2nd place, silver medalist(s)	Henrique Frazão	Brazil	11.15	6.43	11.70	1.89	49.56	15.00w	28.83	3.80	42.61	4:33.99	6689	
3rd place, bronze medalist(s)	Damian Moretta	Argentina	11.38	6.23	11.03	1.86	48.73	14.85w	31.25	3.80	45.93	4:33.99	6683	
	Matheus Pires	Brazil	13.26	5.28	DNS	–	–	–	–	–	–	–	DNF	

== Women's results ==
=== 100 meters ===
Heats – September 29
Wind:
Heat 1: +1.5 m/s, Heat 2: +1.3 m/s

Rank	Heat	Name	Nationality	Time	Notes
1	2	Anahí Suárez	Ecuador	11.49	Q
2	2	Vida Caetano	Brazil	11.70	Q, SB
3	2	María Alejandra Murillo	Colombia	11.83	Q
4	1	Martina Coronato	Uruguay	11.84	Q
5	1	Lorraine Martins	Brazil	11.89	Q
6	1	Shelsy Romero	Colombia	11.95	Q
7	1	Anaís Hernández	Chile	11.98	q
8	1	Paula Daruich	Peru	11.99	q
9	2	Guadalupe Torrez	Bolivia	12.00	
10	2	Nicole Chala	Ecuador	12.01	
11	1	Ruth Andrea Baez	Paraguay	12.10	
12	2	Araceli Contrera	Paraguay	12.11	
13	2	Sofia Casetta	Argentina	12.21	
14	1	Marlene Koss	Argentina	12.33	

Final – September 29

Wind: +0.5 m/s

Rank	Lane	Name	Nationality	Time	Notes
1st place, gold medalist(s)	5	Anahí Suárez	Ecuador	11.37	
2nd place, silver medalist(s)	6	Vida Caetano	Brazil	11.55	SB
3rd place, bronze medalist(s)	4	Martina Coronato	Uruguay	11.71	
4	8	María Alejandra Murillo	Colombia	11.76	
5	3	Lorraine Martins	Brazil	11.76	
6	2	Anaís Hernández	Chile	11.93	
7	1	Paula Daruich	Peru	11.94	
8	7	Shelsy Romero	Colombia	11.98	

=== 200 meters ===
Heats – September 30
Wind:
Heat 1: -0.1 m/s, Heat 2: +2.1 m/s

Rank	Heat	Name	Nationality	Time	Notes
1	1	Anahí Suárez	Ecuador	22.81	Q
2	2	Orangys Jiménez	Venezuela	23.11	Q
3	1	Letícia Lima	Brazil	23.50	Q
4	1	Shary Vallecilla	Colombia	24.26	Q
5	1	Guadalupe Torrez	Bolivia	24.49	q
6	2	María Ignacia Aspillaga	Chile	24.87	Q
7	1	Araceli Contrera	Paraguay	24.90	q
7	2	Ruth Andrea Baez	Paraguay	24.90	Q
9	2	Nicole Chala	Ecuador	25.11	
10	2	Camila Roffo	Argentina	25.15	
11	1	Selene Luciani	Argentina	25.18	
12	2	Laura Martínez	Colombia	26.07	
	1	Martina Coronato	Uruguay	DNS	

Final – October 1

Wind: +1.2 m/s

Rank	Lane	Name	Nationality	Time	Notes
1st place, gold medalist(s)	4	Anahí Suárez	Ecuador	23.09	
2nd place, silver medalist(s)	3	Orangys Jiménez	Venezuela	23.27	
3rd place, bronze medalist(s)	5	Letícia Lima	Brazil	23.56	
4	8	Shary Vallecilla	Colombia	23.94	
5	1	Guadalupe Torrez	Bolivia	24.73	
6	6	María Ignacia Aspillaga	Chile	24.86	
7	7	Ruth Andrea Baez	Paraguay	25.00	
	2	Araceli Contrera	Paraguay	DNS	

=== 400 meters ===
September 30

Rank	Lane	Name	Nationality	Time	Notes
1st place, gold medalist(s)	4	Nicole Caicedo	Ecuador	53.91	
2nd place, silver medalist(s)	3	Maria Victoria de Sena	Brazil	54.11	
3rd place, bronze medalist(s)	5	Giovana dos Santos	Brazil	54.67	
4	6	Ibeyis Romero	Venezuela	56.60	
5	1	Evelin Mercado	Ecuador	56.62	
6	7	Sofia Ibarra	Argentina	57.13	
7	8	Agustina Salazar	Argentina	57.99	
8	2	Araceli Martínez	Paraguay	59.16	

=== 800 meters ===
September 29

Rank	Name	Nationality	Time	Notes
1st place, gold medalist(s)	Berdine Castillo	Chile	2:09.61	
2nd place, silver medalist(s)	Isabelle de Almeida	Brazil	2:10.02	
3rd place, bronze medalist(s)	Lindsey Lopes	Brazil	2:10.31	
4	Andrea Jara	Chile	2:11.15	
5	Araceli Martínez	Paraguay	2:15.20	
6	Nazarena Filpo	Uruguay	2:19.59	

=== 1500 meters ===
September 30

Rank	Name	Nationality	Time	Notes
1st place, gold medalist(s)	Shellcy Sarmiento	Colombia	4:48.76	
2nd place, silver medalist(s)	Stefany López	Colombia	4:49.71	
3rd place, bronze medalist(s)	Mirelle da Silva	Brazil	4:49.99	
4	Andrea Jara	Chile	4:50.02	
	Isabelle de Almeida	Brazil	DQ	R17.2.2

=== 5000 meters ===
September 29

Rank	Name	Nationality	Time	Notes
1st place, gold medalist(s)	Maria Lucineida Moreira	Brazil	16:45.90	
2nd place, silver medalist(s)	Shellcy Sarmiento	Colombia	16:57.78	
3rd place, bronze medalist(s)	Nubia Silva	Brazil	16:58.74	
4	Veronica Huacasi	Peru	17:02.52	

=== 10,000 meters ===
September 30

Rank	Name	Nationality	Time	Notes
1st place, gold medalist(s)	Sofia Mamani	Peru	34:28.33	CR
2nd place, silver medalist(s)	Maria Lucineida Moreira	Brazil	34:45.29	
3rd place, bronze medalist(s)	Nubia Silva	Brazil	35:19.76	
4	Liz Chaparro	Paraguay	38:04.84	

=== 100 meters hurdles ===
October 1
Wind: +1.8 m/s

Rank	Lane	Name	Nationality	Time	Notes
1st place, gold medalist(s)	6	Lays Silva	Brazil	13.57	PB
2nd place, silver medalist(s)	5	Valentina Polanco	Argentina	13.75	
3rd place, bronze medalist(s)	3	Elisa Keitel	Chile	13.86	
4	8	Aimara Nazareno	Ecuador	14.12	
5	7	Rossmary Paredes	Paraguay	14.74	
	4	Ana Luisa Ferraz	Brazil	DQ	R16.8

=== 400 meters hurdles ===
September 29

Rank	Lane	Name	Nationality	Time	Notes
1st place, gold medalist(s)	3	Chayenne da Silva	Brazil	57.51	
2nd place, silver medalist(s)	4	Valeria Cabezas	Colombia	58.12	
3rd place, bronze medalist(s)	6	Camille de Oliveira	Brazil	1:00.09	
4	1	Lucía Sotomayor	Bolivia	1:01.63	
5	8	Paula Mayorga	Peru	1:02.28	
6	7	Génesis Gutiérrez	Venezuela	1:02.39	
7	5	Tania Guasace	Bolivia	1:04.06	
8	2	María Paz Ramírez	Paraguay	1:06.02	

=== 3000 meters steeplechase ===
September 29

Rank	Name	Nationality	Time	Notes
1st place, gold medalist(s)	Mirelle da Silva	Brazil	10:32.79	
2nd place, silver medalist(s)	Stefany López	Colombia	10:46.78	
3rd place, bronze medalist(s)	Veronica Huacasi	Peru	10:56.73	
4	Shalom Lezcano	Argentina	11:48.89	

=== 4 × 100 meters relay ===
September 30

Rank	Lane	Nation	Competitors	Time	Notes
1st place, gold medalist(s)	6	Ecuador	Aimara Nazareno, Anahí Suárez, Nicole Caicedo, Nicole Chala	44.50	
2nd place, silver medalist(s)	5	Brazil	Sabrina Costa, Letícia Lima, Vida Caetano, Vanessa dos Santos	44.57	
3rd place, bronze medalist(s)	4	Colombia	Shelsy Romero, Marlet Ospino, Shary Vallecilla, María Alejandra Murillo	44.74	
4	8	Chile	Rocío Muñoz, Anaís Hernández, María Ignacia Aspillaga, Elisa Keitel	45.85	
5	7	Argentina	Sofia Casetta, Selene Luciani, Marlene Koss, Valentina Polanco	46.39	
6	3	Paraguay	Miriam Ramos, Rossmary Paredes, Ruth Andrea Baez, Araceli Contrera	47.92	

=== 4 × 400 meters relay ===
October 1

Rank	Lane	Nation	Competitors	Time	Notes
1st place, gold medalist(s)	3	Brazil	Leticia de Oliveira, Erica Cavalheiro, Giovana dos Santos, Maria Victoria de Sena	3:37.79	
2nd place, silver medalist(s)	4	Ecuador	Nicole Chala, Evelin Mercado, Aimara Nazareno, Nicole Caicedo	3:47.12	
3rd place, bronze medalist(s)	5	Chile	Rocío Muñoz, Andrea Jara, Anaís Hernández, Berdine Castillo	3:47.64	
4	6	Argentina	Sofia Ibarra, Selene Luciani, Camila Roffo, Agustina Salazar	3:49.15	

=== 20,000 meters walk ===
September 30

Rank	Name	Nationality	Time	Notes
1st place, gold medalist(s)	Paula Milena Torres	Ecuador	1:34:52	
2nd place, silver medalist(s)	Laura Chalarca	Colombia	1:39:17	
3rd place, bronze medalist(s)	Mayra Karen Quispe	Bolivia	1:40:05	
4	Bruna de Oliveira	Brazil	1:47:27	
	Emily Villafuerte	Peru	DNF	

=== High jump ===
October 1

Rank	Name	Nationality	1.55	1.60	1.63	1.66	1.69	1.72	1.74	1.76	1.78	Result	Notes
1st place, gold medalist(s)	Arielly Rodrigues	Brazil	–	–	–	o	o	o	xo	xo	xxx	1.76	
2nd place, silver medalist(s)	Gabriela de Sá	Brazil	–	–	–	o	o	o	o	xxo	xxx	1.76	
3rd place, bronze medalist(s)	Antonia Merino	Chile	–	–	–	o	o	o	xo	xxx		1.74	
4	Olivia García-Huidobro	Chile	–	–	o	o	xo	o	xxx			1.72	
5	Katherine Desiderio	Ecuador	o	o	xo	o	xxx					1.66	
	Silvina Gil	Uruguay	xxx									NM	

=== Pole vault ===
October 1

Rank	Name	Nationality	3.15	3.30	3.40	3.50	3.60	3.70	3.75	3.80	3.85	3.90	3.95	4.00	4.05	4.11	4.16	Result	Notes
1st place, gold medalist(s)	Sophia Salvi	Brazil	–	–	–	–	o	–	o	–	xxo	–	xo	–	o	xxo	xxx	4.11	
2nd place, silver medalist(s)	Carolina Scarponi	Argentina	–	o	–	o	xo	o	–	xo	–	xxo	o	xxx				3.95	
3rd place, bronze medalist(s)	Luna Nazarit	Colombia	–	–	–	–	xo	xo	–	xo	–	o	xxx					3.90	
4	Javiera Moraga	Chile	–	–	o	–	o	xo	xxx									3.70	
	Tatiana Bedoya	Colombia	–	–	xxx													NM	
	Luana de Moura	Brazil	xr															NM	

=== Long jump ===
September 29

Rank	Name	Nationality	#1	#2	#3	#4	#5	#6	Result	Notes
1st place, gold medalist(s)	Rocío Muñoz	Chile	6.32	6.21	x	6.24	6.12	6.21	6.32	
2nd place, silver medalist(s)	Lissandra Campos	Brazil	5.93	x	x	5.92	6.08	6.31	6.31	
3rd place, bronze medalist(s)	Vanessa dos Santos	Brazil	x	6.15	6.02	5.83	5.89	x	6.15	
4	Ana Paula Argüello	Paraguay	5.72	x	5.86	6.05	5.84	x	6.05	
5	Rossmary Paredes	Paraguay	5.35	5.34	5.11	5.06	x	5.16	5.35	

=== Triple jump ===
October 1

Rank	Name	Nationality	#1	#2	#3	#4	#5	#6	Result	Notes
1st place, gold medalist(s)	Valery Arce	Colombia	12.52	12.34	12.69	x	12.62	12.95	12.95	
2nd place, silver medalist(s)	Ana Paula Argüello	Paraguay	12.38	12.75	12.59	12.44	12.63	12.69	12.75	
3rd place, bronze medalist(s)	Whaylla de Oliveira	Brazil	12.53	12.70	12.62	–	12.44	12.50	12.70	
4	Mariana Muller	Brazil	x	x	x	11.23	x	12.63	12.63	
5	Luciana Gennari	Argentina	11.72	x	11.53	11.69	11.78	12.03	12.03	

=== Shot put ===
September 29

Rank	Name	Nationality	#1	#2	#3	#4	#5	#6	Result	Notes
1st place, gold medalist(s)	Rafaela de Sousa	Brazil	14.74	x	15.87	15.08	15.29	14.56	15.87	
2nd place, silver medalist(s)	Lorna Zurita	Ecuador	14.71	15.59	13.88	x	14.79	14.72	15.59	
3rd place, bronze medalist(s)	Taniele da Silva	Brazil	x	11.88	x	13.58	13.92	13.52	13.92	
4	Fedra Florentin	Paraguay	x	13.28	13.26	x	13.78	x	13.78	

=== Discus throw ===
September 30

Rank	Name	Nationality	#1	#2	#3	#4	#5	#6	Result	Notes
1st place, gold medalist(s)	Marya Botega Netto	Brazil	47.06	x	46.43	47.59	47.04	45.27	47.59	
2nd place, silver medalist(s)	Valentina Ulloa	Chile	36.33	47.20	41.95	x	41.28	46.06	47.20	
3rd place, bronze medalist(s)	Yasmin Piske	Brazil	x	45.05	x	x	46.39	46.07	46.39	

=== Hammer throw ===
September 30

Rank	Name	Nationality	#1	#2	#3	#4	#5	#6	Result	Notes
1st place, gold medalist(s)	Ximena Zorrilla	Peru	56.72	63.71	55.37	61.34	60.55	58.12	63.71	
2nd place, silver medalist(s)	Nereida Santacruz	Ecuador	59.14	60.10	x	61.45	x	x	61.45	
3rd place, bronze medalist(s)	Tânia da Silva	Brazil	55.80	x	56.90	56.96	57.44	55.95	57.44	
4	Beatriz Moreira	Brazil	53.97	55.62	51.58	x	54.99	x	55.62	
5	Caterina Massera	Argentina	54.77	51.98	x	x	x	52.47	54.77	
6	María del Pilar Piccardo	Paraguay	50.27	50.12	51.37	50.49	50.54	50.36	51.37	
7	Katerine Tantalean	Peru	46.13	46.21	45.60	44.23	x	x	46.21	

=== Javelin throw ===
October 1

Rank	Name	Nationality	#1	#2	#3	#4	#5	#6	Result	Notes
1st place, gold medalist(s)	Juleisy Angulo	Ecuador	57.14	55.41	–	57.89	–	58.83	58.83	CR
2nd place, silver medalist(s)	Valentina Barrios	Colombia	50.86	50.77	54.65	56.04	55.22	57.31	57.31	
3rd place, bronze medalist(s)	Yiset Jiménez	Colombia	54.14	53.35	x	50.93	53.83	x	54.14	
4	Stefany da Silva	Brazil	53.60	44.24	53.13	–	–	48.73	53.60	
5	Manuela Rotundo	Uruguay	53.26	51.74	x	x	x	50.51	53.26	
6	Agustina Moraga	Argentina	48.52	46.01	45.79	48.29	45.12	47.15	48.52	
7	Bruna de Jesus	Brazil	x	x	43.84	42.25	46.07	48.10	48.10	
8	Fiorella Veloso	Paraguay	42.91	44.18	43.93	x	44.85	41.31	44.85	
9	Ariana Ramírez	Peru	37.71	36.99	36.74				37.71	
10	María José Cáceres	Paraguay	35.22	x	x				35.22	

=== Heptathlon ===
September 29–30

The highest mark recorded in each event is highlighted in yellow

Rank	Athlete	Nationality	100m H	HJ	SP	200m	LJ	JT	800m	Points	Notes
1st place, gold medalist(s)	Paloma Cardoso	Brazil	15.52	1.70	10.83	28.11	5.53	38.65	DNF	4185	
2nd place, silver medalist(s)	Stefany da Silva	Brazil	14.53	1.25	12.17	DNF	4.29w	34.12	DNF	2867	

== Mixed ==
=== 4 × 400 meters relay ===
October 1

Rank	Lane	Nation	Competitors	Time	Notes
1st place, gold medalist(s)	4	Ecuador	Steeven Salas, Evelin Mercado, Alan Minda, Nicole Caicedo	3:23.28	CR
2nd place, silver medalist(s)	3	Argentina	Agustín Pinti, Camila Roffo, Bruno de Genaro, Agustina Salazar	3:31.97	
3rd place, bronze medalist(s)	6	Venezuela	Allan Cortesia, Génesis Gutiérrez, José Chourio, Ibeyis Romero	3:41.57	
	8	Brazil	Marcos Morães, Letícia de Oliveira, Elias dos Santos, Erica Cavalheiro	DQ	R24.19
	5	Paraguay	Albaro Ramírez, María Paz Ramírez, Osvaldo Mendez, Araceli Martínez	DQ	R16.8
	7	Colombia	Neiker Abello, María Alejandra Murillo, Óscar Baltán, Valeria Cabezas	DNF	
