= 2024 South American Under-23 Championships in Athletics – Results =

These are the full results of the 2024 South American Under-23 Championships in Athletics which took place between 27 and 29 September at Estadio de Atletismo La Flora in Bucaramanga, Colombia.

== Men's results ==
=== 100 metres ===
Heats – 27 September
Wind:
Heat 1: -1.2 m/s, Heat 2: 0.0 m/s

Rank	Heat	Name	Nationality	Time	Notes
1	1	Carlos Flórez	Colombia	10.40	Q
2	2	Tomás Villegas	Argentina	10.48	Q
3	2	Gustavo Mongelos	Paraguay	10.50	Q
4	1	Hygor Soares	Brazil	10.51	Q
5	1	Thamer Vilar	Brazil	10.54	Q
6	2	Aron Earl	Peru	10.59	Q
7	2	Luis Hernández	Colombia	10.60	q
8	2	Katriel Angulo	Ecuador	10.62	q
9	1	Iván Romero	Venezuela	10.67	
10	1	Benjamín Aravena	Chile	10.71	
11	1	Keiver Pirela	Venezuela	10.73	
12	1	Roy Chila	Ecuador	10.78	
13	1	Anhuar Duarte	Paraguay	11.02	
14	2	Gio Xiang Bernal	Panama	11.33	

Final – 27 September

Wind: +0.8 m/s

Rank	Lane	Name	Nationality	Time	Notes
1st place, gold medalist(s)	3	Carlos Flórez	Colombia	10.19	
2nd place, silver medalist(s)	4	Tomás Villegas	Argentina	10.41	
3rd place, bronze medalist(s)	6	Hygor Soares	Brazil	10.44	
4	5	Gustavo Mongelos	Paraguay	10.48	
5	7	Aron Earl	Peru	10.50	
6	2	Thamer Vilar	Brazil	10.53	
7	1	Luis Hernández	Colombia	10.55	
8	8	Katriel Angulo	Ecuador	10.71	

=== 200 metres ===
Heats – 28 September
Wind:
Heat 1: -0.7 m/s, Heat 2: -0.3 m/s

Rank	Heat	Name	Nationality	Time	Notes
1	1	Carlos Flórez	Colombia	20.91	Q PB
2	1	Tomás Villegas	Argentina	21.08	Q
3	1	Jhumiler Sánchez	Paraguay	21.29	Q
4	2	Katriel Angulo	Ecuador	21.39	Q
5	1	Óscar Baltán	Colombia	21.44	q
6	2	Keiver Pirela	Venezuela	21.50	Q
7	2	Benjamín Aravena	Chile	21.52	Q
8	2	Iván Romero	Venezuela	21.61	q
9	2	Steeven Salas	Ecuador	21.75	
10	1	Víctor Saldaña	Bolivia	22.14	
11	2	Gio Xiang Bernal	Panama	22.60	
	2	Martín Kouyoumdjian	Chile	DNS	

Final – 29 September

Wind: ? m/s

Rank	Lane	Name	Nationality	Time	Notes
1st place, gold medalist(s)	5	Carlos Flórez	Colombia	21.08	
2nd place, silver medalist(s)	6	Tomás Villegas	Argentina	21.19	
3rd place, bronze medalist(s)	3	Katriel Angulo	Ecuador	21.42	
4	1	Iván Romero	Venezuela	21.50	
5	7	Jhumiler Sánchez	Paraguay	21.52	
6	2	Óscar Baltán	Colombia	21.69	
7	4	Keiver Pirela	Venezuela	21.76	
	8	Benjamín Aravena	Chile	DNS	

=== 400 metres ===
28 September

Rank	Lane	Name	Nationality	Time	Notes
1st place, gold medalist(s)	1	Daniel Balanta	Colombia	46.30	
2nd place, silver medalist(s)	5	Jadson Lima	Brazil	46.45	
3rd place, bronze medalist(s)	3	Martín Kouyoumdjian	Chile	46.95	
4	7	Raúl Palacios	Colombia	47.19	
5	4	Alan Minda	Ecuador	47.29	
6	6	Dhustyn Morquecho	Ecuador	47.63	
7	8	Manuel Robles	Argentina	48.74	
8	2	Paul Wood	Paraguay	49.36	

=== 800 metres ===
29 September

Rank	Name	Nationality	Time	Notes
1st place, gold medalist(s)	Leonardo de Jesus	Brazil	1:47.76	
2nd place, silver medalist(s)	Victor Santos	Brazil	1:50.13	
3rd place, bronze medalist(s)	Klaus Scholz	Chile	1:50.35	
4	Adrián Mendoza	Colombia	1:50.72	
5	Daniel Ruiz	Venezuela	1:50.84	
6	Lucas Jara	Chile	1:51.26	
7	Héctor Gómez	Venezuela	1:51.75	
8	David Preciado	Colombia	1:51.92	
9	Leandro Daza	Bolivia	1:52.19	
10	Omar Sotomayor	Bolivia	1:54.13	
	Uriel Muñoz	Argentina	DNF	

=== 1500 metres ===
27 September

Rank	Name	Nationality	Time	Notes
1st place, gold medalist(s)	Leonardo de Jesus	Brazil	3:43.55	CR
2nd place, silver medalist(s)	Janio Varjão	Brazil	3:44.09	
3rd place, bronze medalist(s)	Ericky dos Santos	Paraguay	3:44.72	
4	Uriel Muñoz	Argentina	3:44.84	
5	Bryan Jara	Chile	3:46.95	
6	Carlos Briceño	Venezuela	3:47.22	
7	Cristhian Escobar	Peru	3:50.68	
8	Lucas Jara	Chile	3:52.58	
9	Thomas Castro	Colombia	3:52.80	
10	Gonzalo Gervasini	Uruguay	3:52.95	
11	Julian Gómez	Colombia	3:57.79	

=== 5000 metres ===
29 September

Rank	Name	Nationality	Time	Notes
1st place, gold medalist(s)	Janio Varjão	Brazil	14:52.62	
2nd place, silver medalist(s)	Jonathan Molina	Peru	14:57.57	
3rd place, bronze medalist(s)	Vinícius Alves	Brazil	15:03.98	
4	Carlos Briceño	Venezuela	15:06.57	
5	Alex Caiza	Ecuador	15:10.68	
6	Joaquín Ponce	Ecuador	15:11.72	
7	Ignacio Carrizo	Chile	15:12.84	
8	Ángel Romero	Chile	15:16.07	
9	Ericky dos Santos	Paraguay	15:19.72	
10	Manuel Ortíz	Colombia	15:23.88	
11	Salvador Gorosito	Argentina	15:24.35	
12	Diego Orozco	Colombia	15:25.21	

=== 10,000 metres ===
27 September

Rank	Name	Nationality	Time	Notes
1st place, gold medalist(s)	Jonathan Molina	Peru	30:54.43	
2nd place, silver medalist(s)	Alex Caiza	Ecuador	31:05.52	
3rd place, bronze medalist(s)	Ignacio Carrizo	Chile	31:09.81	
4	Joaquín Ponce	Ecuador	31:46.77	
5	Peterson Ribeiro	Brazil	32:17.88	
6	Ángel Romero	Chile	32:57.18	
7	Salvador Gorosito	Argentina	33:21.70	
8	Diego Orozco	Colombia	34:09.70	
	Estebán Ortega	Colombia	DQ	RT17.1.2

=== 110 metres hurdles ===
29 September
Wind: +0.5 m/s

Rank	Lane	Name	Nationality	Time	Notes
1st place, gold medalist(s)		Thiago dos Santos	Brazil	13.82	
2nd place, silver medalist(s)		Fabricio Pereira	Brazil	13.92	
3rd place, bronze medalist(s)		Gerónimo Canizales	Colombia	13.95	
4		Kevin Mendieta	Paraguay	14.17	
5		Fabrizio Jara	Paraguay	15.18	

=== 400 metres hurdles ===
September 28

Rank	Lane	Name	Nationality	Time	Notes
1st place, gold medalist(s)	3	Matheus da Silva	Brazil	49.13	
2nd place, silver medalist(s)	6	Neider Abello	Colombia	50.34	
3rd place, bronze medalist(s)	5	Ramón Fuenzalida	Chile	51.31	
4	4	Bruno De Genaro	Argentina	51.50	
5	7	Ian Andrey Pata	Ecuador	52.40	
6	8	Sebastián Mosquera	Colombia	52.53	
7	2	Caio Silva	Brazil	53.45	

=== 3000 metres steeplechase ===
28 September

Rank	Name	Nationality	Time	Notes
1st place, gold medalist(s)	Vinícius Alves	Brazil	9:07.38	
2nd place, silver medalist(s)	Mateus de Alencar	Brazil	9:12.81	
3rd place, bronze medalist(s)	Diego Caldeira	Venezuela	9:21.67	
4	Reinaldo Delgado	Colombia	9:26.17	
5	Kevin Genes	Uruguay	9:44.39	
6	Hipolito Pereiro	Argentina	10:02.41	
7	Sebastián Henao	Colombia	10:11.99	
	Julio Espinoza	Chile	DNF	

=== 4 × 100 metres relay ===
28 September

Rank	Lane	Nation	Competitors	Time	Notes
1st place, gold medalist(s)	4	Colombia	Luis Hernández, Carlos Flórez, Óscar Baltán, Enoc Moreno	39.74	
2nd place, silver medalist(s)	5	Brazil	Thiago dos Santos, Thamer Vilar, Fabricio Pereira, Hygor Soares	40.24	
3rd place, bronze medalist(s)	3	Paraguay	Anhuar Duarte, Kevin Mendieta, Jhumiler Sánchez, Gustavo Mongelos	40.42	
4	6	Ecuador	Ian Andrey Pata, Katriel Angulo, Steeven Salas, Roy Chila	40.81	

=== 4 × 400 metres relay ===
29 September

Rank	Nation	Competitors	Time	Notes
1st place, gold medalist(s)	Brazil	Jadson Lima, Leonardo de Jesus, Caio Silva, Matheus da Silva	3:07.14	
2nd place, silver medalist(s)	Ecuador	Dhustyn Morquecho, Héctor Broncano, Ian Andrey Pata, Alan Minda	3:07.90	
3rd place, bronze medalist(s)	Colombia	Juan Wilches, Raúl Palacios, Neider Abello, Daniel Balanta	3:08.59	
4	Chile	Ramón Fuenzalida, Benjamín Aravena, Martín Kouyoumdjian, Klaus Scholz	3:12.98	

=== 20,000 metres walk ===
27 September

Rank	Name	Nationality	Time	Notes
1st place, gold medalist(s)	Miguel Peña	Colombia	1:25:39.40	
2nd place, silver medalist(s)	Saúl Wamputsrik	Ecuador	1:25:41.10	
3rd place, bronze medalist(s)	Ezequiel Arrubla	Colombia	1:27:39.90	
4	Otavio Vicente	Brazil	1:33:03.40	
5	Sebastián Giuliani	Argentina	1:34:44.30	
	Jaime Ccanto	Peru	DQ	
	Edson de Aguilar	Brazil	DQ	

=== High jump ===
27 September

Rank	Name	Nationality	Result	Notes
1st place, gold medalist(s)	Nicolas Numair	Chile	2.05	
2nd place, silver medalist(s)	Jeiner Mosquera	Colombia	2.05	
3rd place, bronze medalist(s)	Santiago Barberia	Argentina	2.00	
4	Héctor Añez	Venezuela	2.00	
5	Eric da Silva	Brazil	2.00	
6	Paulo Teles	Brazil	1.95	
6	Janer Caicedo	Colombia	1.95	
	Pedro Alamos	Chile	NM	

=== Pole vault ===
27 September

Rank	Name	Nationality	4.50	4.60	4.70	4.80	4.90	5.00	5.05	5.10	5.15	5.20	Result	Notes
1st place, gold medalist(s)	Ricardo Montes de Oca	Venezuela	–	–	–	–	–	xxo	–	o	–	xxx	5.10	
2nd place, silver medalist(s)	Andreas Kreiss	Brazil	–	–	o	o	o	xo	xx–	o	xxx		5.10	
3rd place, bronze medalist(s)	Cristobal Núñez	Chile	–	–	–	o	–	o	–	xxo	x–	xx	5.10	
4	Samuel Estrada	Colombia	–	o	–	xo	o	o	–	xxx			5.00	
	Andrés Torres	Colombia	xxx										NM	

=== Long jump ===
28 September

Rank	Name	Nationality	#1	#2	#3	#4	#5	#6	Result	Notes
1st place, gold medalist(s)	Gabriel Luis Bosa	Brazil	7.93	7.79	x	7.64	x	7.74	7.93	
2nd place, silver medalist(s)	Breno de Carvalho	Brazil	7.70	7.78w	7.77	x	7.70	x	7.78w	
3rd place, bronze medalist(s)	Kevin Simisterra	Ecuador	x	7.25	7.15	7.39	x	7.55	7.55	
4	Martin Saavedra	Argentina	7.11	6.62	7.13	6.86	6.50	7.21	7.21	
5	Luis Ángel Viga	Colombia	6.82	6.79	6.57	6.55	6.69	6.70	6.82	
6	Miguel Lan	Colombia	x	x	x	6.33	x	x	6.33	

=== Triple jump ===
29 September

Rank	Name	Nationality	#1	#2	#3	#4	#5	#6	Result	Notes
1st place, gold medalist(s)	Felipe da Silva	Brazil	x	x	15.41	x	16.25	16.00	16.25	
2nd place, silver medalist(s)	João Pedro de Azevedo	Brazil	15.93	15.74	x	15.06	x	15.57	15.93	
3rd place, bronze medalist(s)	Santiago Theran	Colombia	14.88	15.40	15.47	15.37	15.40	15.61	15.61	
4	Steeven Palacios	Ecuador	15.20	x	14.46	14.84	15.44	15.46	15.46	
5	Nazareno Melgarejo	Argentina	15.02	15.32	13.37	14.99	15.27	14.93	15.32	
6	Óscar Cometa	Colombia	14.53	15.30	15.19	14.68	14.98	15.23	15.30	
7	Yoalber Rodríguez	Venezuela	14.80	14.96	x	14.68	x	14.45	14.96	

=== Shot put ===
27 September

Rank	Name	Nationality	#1	#2	#3	#4	#5	#6	Result	Notes
1st place, gold medalist(s)	Juan Manuel Arrieguez	Argentina	17.13	15.56	15.59	16.80	17.73	x	17.73	
2nd place, silver medalist(s)	Ronald Grueso	Colombia	17.12	x	17.32	17.36	x	x	17.36	
3rd place, bronze medalist(s)	Vinícius Avancini	Brazil	16.44	x	16.14	16.44	17.26	17.32	17.32	
4	Arthur de Sousa	Brazil	x	16.11	16.18	x	x	x	16.18	
5	Brayan Palacios	Colombia	14.87	x	14.66	14.54	x	14.87	14.87	

=== Discus throw ===
27 September

Rank	Name	Nationality	#1	#2	#3	#4	#5	#6	Result	Notes
1st place, gold medalist(s)	Juan David Montaño	Colombia	51.49	52.64	57.00	55.15	56.57	56.98	57.00	
2nd place, silver medalist(s)	Mateus Torres	Brazil	x	51.02	55.83	55.14	54.18	x	55.83	
3rd place, bronze medalist(s)	Alberto dos Santos	Brazil	53.20	x	x	51.84	x	x	53.20	
4	Ronald Grueso	Colombia	50.73	52.38	x	x	52.52	51.51	52.52	
5	Marcos Piton	Argentina	48.78	49.55	x	51.51	48.99	50.46	51.51	
6	Camilo Rojas	Chile	48.08	x	x	50.09	50.03	49.42	50.09	

=== Hammer throw ===
27 September

Rank	Name	Nationality	#1	#2	#3	#4	#5	#6	Result	Notes
1st place, gold medalist(s)	Tomás Olivera	Argentina	x	50.75	x	60.97	62.74	67.22	67.22	
2nd place, silver medalist(s)	Lautaro Vouilloz	Argentina	64.81	x	65.03	x	x	x	65.03	
3rd place, bronze medalist(s)	Miguel Castro	Chile	62.87	62.25	63.27	x	64.03	x	64.03	
4	Marcos Lopes	Brazil	x	50.75	60.61	x	61.16	56.90	61.17	
5	Juan Sebastián Scarpetta	Colombia	56.79	58.22	59.01	58.85	61.01	59.31	61.01	
6	Juan Camilo Díaz	Colombia	x	50.61	52.61	54.05	53.45	53.34	54.05	

=== Javelin throw ===
28 September

Rank	Name	Nationality	#1	#2	#3	#4	#5	#6	Result	Notes
1st place, gold medalist(s)	Lars Flaming	Paraguay	68.26	74.40	67.89	70.98	68.80	74.99	74.99	
2nd place, silver medalist(s)	Lautaro Techera	Uruguay	68.82	73.15	73.33	71.02	71.29	70.92	73.33	
3rd place, bronze medalist(s)	Orlando Fernández	Venezuela	72.09	67.10	68.29	68.59	67.38	65.41	72.09	
4	Yirmar Torres	Ecuador	x	x	59.02	67.09	56.62	59.68	67.09	
5	Arthur Curvo	Brazil	61.97	66.15	64.69	63.60	66.08	64.98	66.15	
6	Santiago Pimentel	Colombia	62.23	65.75	63.87	62.14	65.13	65.47	65.75	
7	Yainer Rodríguez	Colombia	64.48	64.17	65.02	x	60.83	x	65.02	
8	Carlos Rospigliosi	Peru	55.97	58.39	63.25	62.23	x	x	63.25	

=== Decathlon ===
27–28 September

The highest mark recorded in each event is highlighted in yellow

Rank	Athlete	Nationality	100m	LJ	SP	HJ	400m	110m H	DT	PV	JT	1500m	Points	Notes
1st place, gold medalist(s)	Luiz Santos	Brazil	11.22	6.83	10.91	2.07	50.20	15.30	36.83	4.00	48.95	4:52.12	7009	
2nd place, silver medalist(s)	Arnaldo Kowales Júnior	Brazil	11.39	6.96	11.54	1.89	49.28	16.33	35.25	4.10	46.15	4:46.35	6795	
3rd place, bronze medalist(s)	Edgar Rosabal	Uruguay	11.71	6.02	10.85	1.83	53.26	15.33	34.73	3.80	43.59	5:00.19	6144	
4	Wilder Umaña	Colombia	12.46	6.23	10.21	1.71	55.36	16.40	29.49	3.50	41.93	4:55.79	5512	

== Women's results ==
=== 100 metres ===
Heats – 27 September
Wind:
Heat 1: -1.2 m/s, Heat 2: 0.0 m/s

Rank	Heat	Name	Nationality	Time	Notes
1	2	Marlet Ospino	Colombia	11.49	Q
2	1	Laura Martínez	Colombia	11.63	Q
3	2	Daniele Campigotto	Brazil	11.79	Q
4	1	Paula Daruich	Peru	11.92	Q
5	1	Suellen de Sant Ana	Brazil	11.94	Q
6	2	Antonia Ramírez	Chile	12.02	Q
7	2	Cayetana Chirinos	Peru	12.10	q
8	1	Lauren Mendoza	Bolivia	12.12	q
9	2	Emily Aguirre	Venezuela	12.26	

Final – 27 September

Wind: +1.0 m/s

Rank	Lane	Name	Nationality	Time	Notes
1st place, gold medalist(s)	4	Laura Martínez	Colombia	11.45	
2nd place, silver medalist(s)	3	Marlet Ospino	Colombia	11.54	
3rd place, bronze medalist(s)	5	Daniele Campigotto	Brazil	11.71	
4	6	Paula Daruich	Peru	11.86	
5	7	Suellen de Sant Ana	Brazil	12.00	
6	2	Antonia Ramírez	Chile	12.04	
7	1	Cayetana Chirinos	Peru	12.07	
8	8	Lauren Mendoza	Bolivia	12.18	

=== 200 metres ===
29 September
Wind: -0.8 m/s

Rank	Lane	Name	Nationality	Time	Notes
1st place, gold medalist(s)	3	Marlet Ospino	Colombia	23.25	
2nd place, silver medalist(s)	4	Laura Martínez	Colombia	23.70	
3rd place, bronze medalist(s)	6	Daniele Campigotto	Brazil	24.00	
4	5	Antonia Ramírez	Chile	24.26	
5	8	Evelin Mercado	Ecuador	24.71	
6	7	Lauren Mendoza	Bolivia	25.22	

=== 400 metres ===
28 September

Rank	Lane	Name	Nationality	Time	Notes
1st place, gold medalist(s)	3	Erica Cavalheiro	Brazil	52.95	
2nd place, silver medalist(s)	6	Nahomy Castro	Colombia	53.30	
3rd place, bronze medalist(s)	5	Evelin Mercado	Ecuador	53.56	
4	7	Xiomara Ibarra	Ecuador	54.68	
5	4	Isabella Hurtado	Colombia	55.29	

=== 800 metres ===
29 September

Rank	Name	Nationality	Time	Notes
1st place, gold medalist(s)	Luise Braga	Brazil	2:07.29	
2nd place, silver medalist(s)	Anita Poma	Peru	2:08.37	
3rd place, bronze medalist(s)	Sabrina Pena	Brazil	2:08.94	
4	María Celeste Rojas	Venezuela	2:09.81	
5	Matilde Ruiz	Chile	2:13.17	
6	Karol Mosquera	Colombia	2:13.65	
7	Lina Gil	Colombia	2:15.35	

=== 1500 metres ===
27 September

Rank	Name	Nationality	Time	Notes
1st place, gold medalist(s)	Anita Poma	Peru	4:27.46	
2nd place, silver medalist(s)	Karol Luna	Colombia	4:27.58	
3rd place, bronze medalist(s)	Mirelle da Silva	Brazil	4:34.58	
4	Laura Camargo	Colombia	4:36.90	
5	Luz Arias	Peru	4:38.54	
6	Matilde Ruiz	Chile	4:45.65	
7	Luise Braga	Brazil	4:48.23	
8	Julieta Firpo	Uruguay	4:48.95	

=== 5000 metres ===
29 September

Rank	Name	Nationality	Time	Notes
1st place, gold medalist(s)	Benita Parra	Bolivia	16:30.61	CR
2nd place, silver medalist(s)	Nubia Silva	Brazil	16:45.17	
3rd place, bronze medalist(s)	Verónica Huacasi	Peru	16:46.10	
4	Danna Díaz	Colombia	17:21.75	
5	Leydi Raura	Ecuador	17:32.90	
6	Laura Rojas	Colombia	17:48.07	
7	Luz Arias	Peru	17:53.84	

=== 10,000 metres ===
27 September

Rank	Name	Nationality	Time	Notes
1st place, gold medalist(s)	Nubia Silva	Brazil	35:37.51	
2nd place, silver medalist(s)	Benita Parra	Bolivia	35:39.10	
3rd place, bronze medalist(s)	Jeidy Mora	Colombia	37:36.66	
4	Angelica Salcedo	Colombia	38:41.12	
5	Luisa de Almeida	Brazil	39:25.09	

=== 100 metres hurdles ===
29 September
Wind: +0.1 m/s

Rank	Lane	Name	Nationality	Time	Notes
1st place, gold medalist(s)		Luciana Zapata	Colombia	13.40	
2nd place, silver medalist(s)		Lays Silva	Brazil	13.59	
3rd place, bronze medalist(s)		Helen Bernard	Argentina	13.64	
4		Maria Luiza Silva	Brazil	13.70	
5		Isabel Urrutia	Colombia	13.91	
5		Catalina Rozas	Chile	13.91	
7		Marlene Koss	Argentina	14.28	
8		Millie Díaz	Uruguay	15.40	

=== 400 metres hurdles ===
28 September

Rank	Lane	Name	Nationality	Time	Notes
1st place, gold medalist(s)	6	Helen Bernard	Argentina	1:00.02	
2nd place, silver medalist(s)	4	Camille de Oliveira	Brazil	1:00.08	
3rd place, bronze medalist(s)	5	Camilly dos Santos	Brazil	1:02.15	
4	3	Emily Montaño	Colombia	1:02.43	
5	7	Martha Córdoba	Colombia	1:05.15	

=== 3000 metres steeplechase ===
28 September

Rank	Name	Nationality	Time	Notes
1st place, gold medalist(s)	Mirelle da Silva	Brazil	10:33.61	
2nd place, silver medalist(s)	Verónica Huacasi	Peru	10:34.15	
3rd place, bronze medalist(s)	Leydi Raura	Ecuador	10:37.58	
4	Stefany López	Colombia	10:42.95	
5	Jeny Barcenas	Colombia	11:25.96	

=== 4 × 100 metres relay ===
September 28

Rank	Lane	Nation	Competitors	Time	Notes
1st place, gold medalist(s)	6	Brazil	Maria Luiza Silva, Vanessa dos Santos, Suellen de Sant Ana, Daniele Campigotto	45.60	
	4	Peru	Jimena Reyes, Paula Daruich, Bianca Conroy, Cayetana Chirinos	DNF	
	5	Colombia	Stefany Julio, Marlet Ospino, Laura Martínez, Danna Banquez	DNF	

=== 4 × 400 metres relay ===
29 September

Rank	Nation	Competitors	Time	Notes
1st place, gold medalist(s)	Colombia	Isabella Hurtado, Karol Mosquera, Isabella Castillo, Nahomy Castro	3:40.49	
2nd place, silver medalist(s)	Brazil	Camilly dos Santos, Luise Braga, Sabrina Pena, Erica Cavalheiro	3:46.30	
3rd place, bronze medalist(s)	Peru	Paula Daruich, Bianca Conroy, Cayetana Chirinos, Jimena Reyes	4:08.14	

=== 20,000 metres walk ===
27 September

Rank	Name	Nationality	Time	Notes
1st place, gold medalist(s)	Natalia Pulido	Colombia	1:41:28.60	
2nd place, silver medalist(s)	Gabriela Muniz	Brazil	1:43:54.60	
3rd place, bronze medalist(s)	Inés Huallpa	Bolivia	1:46:00.30	
4	Gabrielly dos Santos	Brazil	1:50:43.10	
5	Laura Pedraza	Colombia	1:52:00.10	

=== High jump ===
28 September

Rank	Name	Nationality	1.70	1.75	1.78	1.81	1.85	1.88	Result	Notes
1st place, gold medalist(s)	María Arboleda	Colombia	o	o	o	o	xxo	o	1.88	
2nd place, silver medalist(s)	Maria Eduarda Barbosa	Brazil	xo	xo	o	xxx			1.78	
3rd place, bronze medalist(s)	Arielly Rodrigues	Brazil	o	o	xxx				1.75	
4	Hellen Tenorio	Colombia	xo	xo	xxx				1.75	
	Abril Okon	Argentina	xxx						NM	

=== Pole vault ===
27 September

Rank	Name	Nationality	3.50	3.60	3.70	3.80	3.90	4.01	Result	Notes
1st place, gold medalist(s)	Luna Pabón	Colombia	–	o	xo	o	o	xxx	3.90	
2nd place, silver medalist(s)	Karen Bedoya	Colombia	o	o	o	xxo	xxx		3.80	
	Arantxa Cortez	Peru	–	xxx					NM	
	Julia Calabrette	Brazil	–	xxx					NM	

=== Long jump ===
27 September

Rank	Name	Nationality	Result	Notes
1st place, gold medalist(s)	Vanessa dos Santos	Brazil	6.22	
2nd place, silver medalist(s)	Rayssa Rodrigues	Brazil	6.06	
3rd place, bronze medalist(s)	Paula Daruich	Peru	6.01	
4	Victoria Zanolli	Argentina	5.97	
5	Daniela Vaca	Bolivia	5.80	
6	Marlene Koss	Argentina	5.51	
7	María Paula Reinoso	Colombia	5.14	
8	Yaritza Castro	Colombia	4.90	

=== Triple jump ===
28 September

Rank	Name	Nationality	#1	#2	#3	#4	#5	#6	Result	Notes
1st place, gold medalist(s)	Regiclecia da Silva	Brazil	13.55	13.46	13.73	13.71	x	13.67	13.73	
2nd place, silver medalist(s)	Valery Arce	Colombia	13.02	x	13.11	13.17	12.89	12.60	13.17	
3rd place, bronze medalist(s)	Estrella Lobo	Colombia	12.76	12.69	x	12.70	x	12.71	12.76	
4	Whaylla de Oliveira	Brazil	12.33	12.34	12.37	x	12.45	12.54	12.54	
5	Millie Díaz	Uruguay	11.85	12.26	11.96	12.05	x	11.93	12.26	
6	Luciana Gennari	Argentina	11.34	11.83	11.85	11.61	x	11.80	11.85	

=== Shot put ===
29 September

Rank	Name	Nationality	#1	#2	#3	#4	#5	#6	Result	Notes
1st place, gold medalist(s)	Taniele da Silva	Brazil	13.42	x	12.99	15.06	x	14.32	15.06	
2nd place, silver medalist(s)	Esteisy Salas	Colombia	13.90	14.19	14.95	13.55	14.60	14.26	14.95	
3rd place, bronze medalist(s)	Edmara de Jesus	Brazil	13.61	14.14	13.82	14.11	14.29	14.12	14.29	
4	Alicia Grootfaam	Suriname	13.81	13.43	14.14	13.72	13.32	x	14.14	
5	Florencia Dupans	Argentina	13.60	x	14.03	13.12	14.13	x	14.13	
6	Sury Murillo	Colombia	x	11.61	13.05	x	13.77	12.71	13.77	

=== Discus throw ===
29 September

Rank	Name	Nationality	#1	#2	#3	#4	#5	#6	Result	Notes
1st place, gold medalist(s)	Florencia Dupans	Argentina	36.98	43.52	43.67	45.00	48.29	x	48.29	
2nd place, silver medalist(s)	Samanta Lopes	Brazil	44.69	47.96	x	46.63	44.57	x	47.96	
3rd place, bronze medalist(s)	Angelica Caicedo	Colombia	44.45	45.35	45.94	47.13	47.71	42.82	47.71	
4	Thaina Conceiçao	Brazil	44.49	x	45.10	45.66	46.44	45.41	46.44	
5	Ottainys Mercedes	Venezuela	42.59	x	44.02	45.59	41.50	42.11	45.59	
6	María Candela Ratibel	Argentina	44.18	43.00	44.94	x	x	37.98	44.94	
7	Valery Franco	Colombia	40.90	39.69	38.38	x	x	41.39	41.39	

=== Hammer throw ===
27 September

Rank	Name	Nationality	#1	#2	#3	#4	#5	#6	Result	Notes
1st place, gold medalist(s)	Nereida Santacruz	Ecuador	63.25	63.56	x	62.19	63.75	?	63.75	
2nd place, silver medalist(s)	Yenniver Veroes	Venezuela	57.79	x	57.52	55.81	56.60	59.32	59.32	
3rd place, bronze medalist(s)	Giuliana Baigorria	Argentina	x	59.03	57.90	x	x	x	59.03	
4	Agnys dos Santos	Brazil	58.54	x	58.25	56.89	x	56.44	58.54	
5	Catalina Rodríguez	Colombia	58.13	55.18	55.56	51.82	56.30	57.26	58.13	
6	Yennifer Barahona	Colombia	52.10	x	x	x	54.59	x	54.59	
7	Kinbely Asis	Brazil	x	52.99	x	x	53.66	x	53.66	

=== Javelin throw ===
27 September

Rank	Name	Nationality	#1	#2	#3	#4	#5	#6	Result	Notes
1st place, gold medalist(s)	Manuela Rotundo	Uruguay	52.71	57.27	55.08	x	x	51.75	57.27	
2nd place, silver medalist(s)	Valentina Barrios	Colombia	48.89	50.22	50.59	50.08	52.20	53.61	53.61	
3rd place, bronze medalist(s)	Fiorella Veloso	Paraguay	46.25	47.16	47.32	47.45	49.43	46.69	49.43	
4	Stefany da Silva	Brazil	42.02	48.51	38.27	42.96	46.94	49.11	49.11	
5	Laura Ordóñez	Colombia	43.97	45.30	41.37	x	45.55	41.69	45.55	
6	Kymberly Flores	Peru	37.01	36.52	39.18	35.65	38.42	39.19	39.19	

=== Heptathlon ===
27–29 September

The highest mark recorded in each event is highlighted in yellow

Rank	Athlete	Nationality	100m H	HJ	SP	200m	LJ	JT	800m	Points	Notes
1st place, gold medalist(s)	Tainara Mees	Brazil	14.07	1.61	13.14	24.59	5.71	35.81	2:31.23	5404	
2nd place, silver medalist(s)	Ana Paula Argüello	Paraguay	14.22	1.61	11.70	25.16	5.64	36.69	2:33.95	5196	
3rd place, bronze medalist(s)	Renata Godoy	Argentina	15.49	1.64	12.16	25.65	5.38	41.75	2:27.19	5156	
4	Yudisa Martínez	Colombia	15.17	1.64	11.32	25.75	4.61	42.07	2:41.84	4752	
5	Julia Leite	Brazil	14.69	1.58	9.87	26.33	5.31	33.14	2:31.11	4745	
6	Zharick Martínez	Colombia	DQ	1.52	10.85	27.07	5.49	28.81	2:28.19	3802	
7	Mariangelic Rojas	Venezuela	14.80	1.49	9.92	DQ	5.19	29.37	2:47.78	3566	
	Sofia Ingold	Uruguay	15.21	1.52	9.26	26.29	5.26	26.10	DNS	DNF	

== Mixed results ==
=== 4 × 400 metres relay ===
27 September

Rank	Nation	Competitors	Time	Notes
1st place, gold medalist(s)	Colombia	Raúl Palacios, Paola Loboa, Daniel Balanta, Nahomy Castro	3:19.88	CR, NU23R
2nd place, silver medalist(s)	Ecuador	Dhustyn Morquecho, Xiomara Ibarra, Alan Minda, Evelin Mercado	3:22.08	NR
3rd place, bronze medalist(s)	Brazil	Jadson Lima, Camille de Oliveira, Caio Silva, Erica Cavalheiro	3:26.88	
