= 2021 South American Under-23 Championships in Athletics =

IX South American Under-23 Championships in Athletics
- Dates: 16–17 October
- Host city: Guayaquil, Ecuador
- Venue: Estadio Modelo Alberto Spencer Herrera
- Level: Under-23
- Events: 45
- Participation: 272 athletes from 13 nations
- Records set: 3 CRs

The 2021 South American Under-23 Championships in Athletics was the ninth edition of the biennial track and field competition for South American athletes aged under 23 years old, organised by Atletismo Sudamericano. The event was originally scheduled for 2020 but had to be postponed due to the COVID-19 pandemic.

== Medal summary ==
=== Men ===
Event	Gold		Silver		Bronze	
100 metres (wind: +0.2 m/s)	Erik Cardoso (BRA)	10.25	Lucas da Silva (BRA)	10.41	Anderson Marquinez (ECU)	10.46
200 metres (wind: -0.7 m/s)	Anderson Marquinez (ECU)	20.52	Lucas da Silva (BRA)	20.68	Lucas Vilar (BRA)	20.99
400 metres	Douglas da Silva (BRA)	47.22	Javier Gómez (VEN)	47.24	João Henrique Cabral (BRA)	47.40
800 metres	Eduardo Moreira (BRA)	1:47.78	Leonardo de Jesus (BRA)	1:48.31	Estanislao Mendivil (ARG)	1:49.39
1500 metres	Eduardo Moreira (BRA)	3:48.44	Leandro Pérez (ARG)	3:49.16	Matheus Borges (BRA)	3:51.13
5000 metres	Edimar Souza (BRA)	14:33.44	Fábio Correia (BRA)	14:41.40	David Ninavia (BOL)	14:51.36
10,000 metres	Fábio Correia (BRA)	30:27.47	Juliano de Araújo (BRA)	30:37.09	David Ninavia (BOL)	31:08.34
110 metres hurdles (wind: +0.7 m/s)	Marcos Herrera (ECU)	14.10	Martín Sáenz (CHI)	14.24	Vinícius Catai (BRA)	14.27
400 metres hurdles	Francisco Guilherme dos Reis Viana (BRA)	51.17	Matheus Coelho (BRA)	52.15	César Parra (VEN)	52.31
3000 metres steeplechase	Julio Palomino (PER)	8:51.65	Vinícius Alves (BRA)	9:12.09	Natan Nepomuceno (BRA)	9:25.21
4 × 100 m relay	Colombia (COL); Carlos Flórez; Neiker Abello; Carlos Palacios; Arnovis Dalmero	39.90	Ecuador (ECU); Johan Tejena; Anderson Marquinez; Katriel Angulo; Steeven Salas	40.41	Argentina (ARG); Ezequiel Bustamante; Alejo Pafundi; Franco Camiolo; Franco Florio	41.29
4 × 400 m relay	Brazil (BRA); Evandro Martins; Marcos Morães; João Henrique Cabral; Douglas da Silva	3:08.78	Ecuador (ECU); Katriel Angulo; Miguel Maldonado; Steeven Salas; Alan Minda	3:10.63	Colombia (COL); Neider Abello; Juan Manuel Mena; Ronald Grueso; Neiker Abello	3:21.28
20,000 m walk	Matheus Corrêa (BRA)	1:24:30.45	César Herrera (COL)	1:25:43.39	Gonzalo Bustán (ECU)	1:30:51.90
High jump	Elton Petronilho (BRA)	2.15 m	Nicolas Numair (CHI)	2.12 m	Anderson Asprilla (COL)	2.09 m
Pole vault	Dyander Pacho (ECU)	5.20 m	Austin Ramos (ECU)	5.20 m	Pablo Zaffaroni (ARG)	5.00 m
Long jump	Arnovis Dalmero (COL)	8.04 m	Weslley Beraldo (BRA)	7.86 m	Gabriel Boza (BRA)	7.84 m
Triple jump	Geiner Moreno (COL)	16.21 m	Frixon Chila (ECU)	15.83 m	Gregory Palacios (ECU)	15.78 m
Shot put	Nazareno Sasia (ARG)	19.11 m	Ronald Grueso (COL)	17.62 m	Camilo Reyes (CHI)	17.33 m
Discus throw	Lucas Nervi (CHI)	60.87 m CR	Alan de Falchi (BRA)	58.79 m	Nazareno Sasia (ARG)	55.24 m
Hammer throw	Alencar Pereira (BRA)	69.81 m	Daniel Leal (CHI)	63.57 m	Julio Nobile (ARG)	61.63 m
Javelin throw	Luiz Maurício da Silva (BRA)	70.73 m	Willian Torres (ECU)	69.77 m	Antonio Gabriel Ortiz (PAR)	67.81 m
Decathlon	José Fernando Ferreira (BRA)	7046 pts	Julio Angulo (COL)	6755 pts	Jonathan da Silva (BRA)	6676 pts

=== Women ===
Event	Gold		Silver		Bronze	
100 metres (wind: +0.5 m/s)	Anahí Suárez (ECU)	11.46	Gabriela Mourão (BRA)	11.77	Guillermina Cossio (ARG)	11.79
200 metres (wind: +0.3 m/s)	Anahí Suárez (ECU)	23.24	Letícia Lima (BRA)	23.54	Guillermina Cossio (ARG)	23.98
400 metres	Angie Melisa Arévalo (COL)	52.79	Maria Victoria de Sena (BRA)	52.86	Martina Weil (CHI)	53.47
800 metres	Berdine Castillo (CHI)	2:05.98	Isabelle de Almeida (BRA)	2:07.68	Anita Poma (PER)	2:09.92
1500 metres	Laura Acuña (CHI)	4:27.56	Isabelle de Almeida (BRA)	4:30.13	Gabriela Tardivo (BRA)	4:31.13
5000 metres	Maria Lucineida Moreira (BRA)	16:51.67	Sofia Isabel Mamani (PER)	16:57.07	Laura Espinosa (COL)	17:04.85
10,000 metres	Maria Lucineida Moreira (BRA)	35:25.83	Sofia Luizaga (BOL)	36:07.26	Virginia Huatorongo (PER)	36:28.07
100 metres hurdles (wind: +2.4 m/s)	Ketiley Batista (BRA)	13.45	Nicol Caicedo (ECU)	13.98	Daniele Campigotto (BRA)	14.44
400 metres hurdles	Chayenne da Silva (BRA)	56.99	Valeria Cabezas (COL)	57.83	Marlene dos Santos (BRA)	59.60
3000 metres steeplechase	Mirelle da Silva (BRA)	10:28.93	Clara Baiocchi (ARG)	10:41.61	Stefany López (COL)	10:44.79
4 × 100 m relay	Brazil (BRA); Vida Caetano; Lorraine Martins; Letícia Lima; Gabriela Mourão	44.48	Ecuador (ECU); Jazmin Chala; Liseth Chillambo; Nicol Caicedo; Anahí Suárez	45.90	Chile (CHI); Rocío Muñoz; Martina Weil; Anaís Hernández; María Trinidad Hurtado	46.06
4 × 400 m relay	Brazil (BRA); Rita Silva; Tiffani Marinho; Giovana dos Santos; Maria Victoria de Sena	3:38.28	Chile (CHI); Rocío Muñoz; Berdine Castillo; Anaís Hernández; Martina Weil	3:41.48	Colombia (COL); Valeria Cabezas; Stefany López; Yeimy Echeverry; Angie Melisa Arévalo	3:46.19
20,000 m walk	Glenda Morejón (ECU)	1:32:01.67 CR	Mary Luz Andía (PER)	1:35:27.73	Mayra Quispe (BOL)	1:36:27.48
High jump	Jennifer Rodríguez (COL)	1.80 m	Arielly Rodrigues (BRA)	1.77 m	Olivia García (CHI)	1.74 m
Pole vault	Isabel de Quadros (BRA)	4.25 m	Karen Bedoya (COL)	3.95 m	Antonia Crestani (CHI)	3.90 m
Long jump	Thaina Fernandes (BRA)	6.44 m (w)	Lissandra Campos (BRA)	6.33 m	Chantoba Bright (GUY)	6.09 m
Triple jump	Nerisnelia Sousa (BRA)	13.15 m	Chantoba Bright (GUY)	13.08 m	Leidy Cuesta (COL)	12.80 m
Shot put	Maria Fernanda de Aviz (BRA)	16.28 m	Milena Sens (BRA)	15.92 m	Lorna Zurita (ECU)	14.79 m
Discus throw	Catalina Bravo (CHI)	55.38 m	Yosiris Córdoba (COL)	54.65 m	Valquiria Meurer (BRA)	53.27 m
Hammer throw	Carolina Ulloa (COL)	62.51 m	Ximena Zorrilla (PER)	60.57 m	Valentina Claveria (CHI)	58.22 m
Javelin throw	Juleisy Angulo (ECU)	54.52 m	Valentina Barrios (COL)	53.59 m	Deisiane Teixeira (BRA)	52.79 m
Heptathlon	Sara Isabel García (COL)	5219 pts	Naiuri Krein (BRA)	5147 pts	Larissa Macena (BRA)	5108 pts

=== Mixed ===
Event	Gold		Silver		Bronze	
4 × 400 m relay	Brazil (BRA); Evandro Martins; Tiffani Marinho; Giovana dos Santos; Marcos Morães	3:25.09 CR	Ecuador (ECU); Freddy Vásquez; Evelyn Mercado; Andreina Minda; Steeven Salas	3:39.19	Argentina (ARG); Guillermina Cossio; Estanislao Mendivil; Clara Baiocchi; Alejo Pafundi	4:06.66

== Medal table ==
Rank	Nation	Gold	Silver	Bronze	Total
1	Brazil (BRA)	25	18	13	56
2	Ecuador (ECU)	7	8	4	19
3	Colombia (COL)	7	7	6	20
4	Chile (CHI)	4	4	6	14
5	Peru (PER)	1	3	2	6
6	Argentina (ARG)	1	2	8	11
7	Bolivia (BOL)	0	1	3	4
8	Guyana (GUY)	0	1	1	2
8	Venezuela (VEN)	0	1	1	2
10	Paraguay (PAR)	0	0	1	1
11	El Salvador (ESA)	0	0	0	0
11	Suriname (SUR)	0	0	0	0
11	Uruguay (URU)	0	0	0	0
Totals (13 entries)		45	45	45	135

== Participation ==
- Argentina (16)
- Bolivia (7)
- Brazil (79)
- Chile (28)
- Colombia (43)
- Ecuador (61)
- Guyana (3)
- Paraguay (3)
- Peru (11)
- El Salvador (1)
- Suriname (1)
- Uruguay (5)
- Venezuela (14)
