= Manuela Rotundo =

Uruguayan javelin thrower (born 2004)

Personal information
- Full name: Manuela Rotundo Silvera
- Born: 19 July 2004 (age 22) Paysandú, Uruguay
- Education: University of Georgia
- Height: 1.78 m (5 ft 10 in)
- Weight: 75 kg (165 lb)

Sport
- Sport: Athletics
- Event: Javelin throw
- College team: Georgia GymDogs
Medal record
Women's athletics
Representing Uruguay
World U20 Championships
Bronze medal – third place	2022 Cali	Javelin throw
Junior Pan American Games
Silver medal – second place	2025 Asunción	Javelin throw
South American U23 Championships
Gold medal – first place	2024 Bucaramanga	Javelin throw
South American U20 Championships
Gold medal – first place	2023 Bogotá	Javelin throw
Silver medal – second place	2021 Lima	Javelin throw

Manuela Rotundo Silvera (born 19 July 2004) is a Uruguayan athlete specialising in the javelin throw. She won the bronze medal at the 2022 World U20 Championships.

Her personal best in the event is 64.17 metres set in Gainesville in 2025. This is the current national record.

== International competitions ==
Year	Competition	Venue	Position	Event	Notes
Representing Uruguay
2021	South American U20 Championships	Lima, Peru	2nd	Javelin throw	46.45 m
2021	South American U18 Championships	Encarnación, Paraguay	1st	Javelin throw (500 g)	47.15 m
2022	Ibero-American Championships	La Nucia, Spain	5th	Javelin throw	55.81 m
2022	World U20 Championships	Cali, Colombia	3rd	Javelin throw	55.11 m
2022	South American U23 Championships	Cascavel, Brazil	5th	Javelin throw	53.26 m
2022	South American Games	Asunción, Paraguay	4th	Javelin throw	53.23 m
2023	South American U20 Championships	Bogotá, Colombia	1st	Javelin throw	56.24 m
2023	South American Championships	São Paulo, Brazil	5th	Javelin throw	54.66 m
2023	Pan American U20 Championships	Mayagüez, Puerto Rico	1st	Javelin throw	55.49 m
2023	Pan American Games	Santiago, Chile	6th	Javelin throw	58.35 m
2024	Ibero-American Championships	Cuiabá, Brazil	3rd	Javelin throw	61.84 m
2024	South American U23 Championships	Bucaramanga, Colombia	1st	Javelin throw	57.27 m
2025	South American Championships	Mar del Plata, Argentina	4th	Javelin throw	56.48 m
2025	Junior Pan American Games (U23)	Asunción, Paraguay	2nd	Javelin throw	57.44 m
2025	World Championships	Tokyo, Japan	24th (q)	Javelin throw	57.43 m
2026	South American Games	Santa Fe, Argentina	4th	Javelin throw	54.35 m
2026	South American U23 Championships	Santa Fe, Argentina	1st	Javelin throw	52.31 m
