= Elton Petronilho =

Brazilian track and field athlete

Personal information
- Full name: Elton Junio dos Santos Petronilho
- Born: 27 December 2001 (age 24)

Sport
- Sport: Athletics
- Event: Triple jump

Achievements and titles
- Personal bests: Triple jump: 17.05m (2026); High jump: 2.19m (2021)
Medal record
Men's athletics
Representing Brazil
Pan American Championships
Silver medal – second place	2026 Medellín	Triple jump
Ibero-American Championships
Gold medal – first place	2026 Lima	Triple jump
South American Games
Gold medal – first place	2026 Santa Fe	Triple jump
South American Championships
Silver medal – second place	2025 Mar del Plata	Triple jump
South American Indoor Championships
Gold medal – first place	2025 Cochabamba	Triple jump
Gold medal – first place	2026 Cochabamba	Triple jump
Junior Pan American Games
Silver medal – second place	2021 Cali-Valle	High jump
South American U23 Championships
Gold medal – first place	2021 Guayaquil	High jump
Gold medal – first place	2022 Cascavel	Triple jump
Gold medal – first place	2022 Cascavel	High jump

Elton Junio dos Santos Petronilho (born 27 December 2001) is a Brazilian triple jumper. He won the gold medal over 60 metres hurdles at the 2025 and 2026 South American Indoor Championships. He won the silver medal in the 110 metres hurdles at the 2025 South American Championships and represented Brazil at the 2025 World Championships and 2025 World Indoor Championships.

== Biography ==
From Bom Sucesso, Minas Gerais, he lost a year of his schooling after being hit by a car when he was a seven years-old, and almost had a leg amputated. As a junior athlete, he competed in high jump as well as triple jump.

Competing at the 2021 Junior Pan American Games in Cali, Colombia, he won the silver medal in the high jump. He won the gold medal in both the high jump and triple jump at the 2022 South American U23 Championships. He won the triple jump at the senior 2024 Brazilian Athletics Championships in São Paulo with a jump of 16.16 metres.

In 2025, he won the triple jump at the 2025 South American Indoor Championships in Cochabamba, Bolivia, with a jump of 16.52 metres. He subsequently finished eleventh at the 2025 World Athletics Indoor Championships in Nanjing, China; with a jump of 16.28 metres. He was the silver medalist at the 2025 South American Championships behind compatriot Almir dos Santos. In September 2025, he competed at the 2025 World Championships in Tokyo, Japan, jumping 16.51 metres without advancing to the final.

Competing at the 2026 South American Indoor Championships in Bolivia, he won the gold medal in the triple jump ahead of Almir dos Santos with a personal best of 17.05m. On 20 March, he placed tenth overall at the 2026 World Athletics Indoor Championships in Toruń, Poland, with a best jump of 16.61 metres.
