= Geiner Moreno =

Colombian triple jumper (born 2000)

Personal information
- Full name: Geiner Moreno Chiquillo
- Born: 24 June 2000 (age 26) Cartagena, Colombia
- Height: 1.76 m (5 ft 9 in)
- Weight: 74 kg (163 lb)

Sport
- Sport: Athletics
- Events: Long jump; Triple jump

Achievements and titles
- Personal bests: Long jump: 7.53 m (2024); Triple jump: 16.87 m (2024)
Medal record
Representing Colombia
Men's athletics
Event	1st	2nd	3rd
Ibero-American Championships	0	0	1
South American Championships	0	1	0
South American Indoor Championships	0	1	0
Bolivarian Games	0	2	0
Junior Pan American Games	0	1	0
Pan American U20 Championships	1	0	0
South American U23 Championships	1	2	0
South American U20 Championships	0	1	1
Total	2	8	2
Ibero-American Championships
Bronze medal – third place	2024 Cuiabá	Triple jump
South American Championships
Silver medal – second place	2023 São Paulo	Triple jump
South American Indoor Championships
Silver medal – second place	2024 Cochabamba	Triple jump
Bolivarian Games
Silver medal – second place	2022 Valledupar	Triple jump
Silver medal – second place	2025 Lima-Ayacucho	Triple jump
Junior Pan American Games
Silver medal – second place	2021 Cali-Valle	Triple jump
Pan American U20 Championships
Gold medal – first place	2019 San José	Triple jump
South American U23 Championships
Gold medal – first place	2021 Guayaquil	Triple jump
Silver medal – second place	2018 Cuenca	Triple jump
Silver medal – second place	2022 Cascavel	Triple jump
South American U20 Championships
Silver medal – second place	2019 Cali	Triple jump
Bronze medal – third place	2017 Leonora	Triple jump

Geiner Moreno Chiquillo (born 24 June 2000) is a Colombian athlete specialising in the triple jump. He represented his country at the 2023 World Championships in Budapest without reaching the final.

His personal bests in the event is 16.87 metres outdoors (+0.3 m/s, Cochabamba 2024) and 16.22 metres indoors (Cochabamba 2024), the latter is national records.

== International competitions ==
Year	Competition	Venue	Position	Event	Notes
Representing Colombia
2017	South American U20 Championships	Leonora, Guyana	3rd	Triple jump	14.95 m
2017	World U18 Championships	Nairobi, Kenya	16th (q)	Triple jump	13.84 m
2018	South American U23 Championships	Cuenca, Ecuador	2nd	Triple jump	15.76 m
2019	South American U20 Championships	Cali, Colombia	2nd	Triple jump	15.81 m
2019	Pan American U20 Championships	San José, Costa Rica	1st	Triple jump	16.40 m
2021	South American Championships	Guayaquil, Ecuador	6th	Triple jump	15.99 m
2021	South American U23 Championships	Guayaquil, Ecuador	1st	Triple jump	16.21 m
2021	Junior Pan American Games (U23)	Cali, Colombia	2nd	Triple jump	16.41 m
2022	Bolivarian Games	Valledupar, Colombia	2nd	Triple jump	16.11 m
2022	South American U23 Championships	Cascavel, Brazil	2nd	Triple jump	16.37 m
2022	South American Games	Asunción, Paraguay	4th	Triple jump	15.59 m
2023	South American Championships	São Paulo, Brazil	2nd	Triple jump	16.58 m
2023	World Championships	Budapest, Hungary	—N/a	Triple jump	NM
2024	South American Indoor Championships	Cochabamba, Bolivia	2nd	Triple jump	16.22 m NR
2024	Ibero-American Championships	Cuiabá, Brazil	3rd	Triple jump	16.54 m
2024	Olympic Games	Paris, France	23rd (q)	Triple jump	16.40 m
2025	Bolivarian Games	Lima, Peru	2nd	Triple jump	16.39 m
