= Neiker Abello =

Colombian sprinter

Personal information
- Full name: Neiker Jesús Abello Sánchez
- Born: March 30, 2000 (age 26) Maracaibo, Venezuela

Sport
- Country: Colombia
- Sport: Athletics
- Events: 60 metres; 100 metres; 200 metres; 400 metres; 4×100 metres; 4×400 metres; Mixed relay

Achievements and titles
- Personal bests: 60 metres: 6.56 NR (2025); 100 metres: 10.14 (2024); 200 metres: 20.61 (2025); 400 metres: 47.32 (2021); 4×100 metres: 38.17 NR (2026); 4×400 metres: 3:09.29 (2023); 4×100 metres mixed: 41.55 NR (2026); Mixed relay: 3:23.79 (2021)
Medal record
Representing Colombia
Men's athletics
Event	1st	2nd	3rd
Ibero-American Championships	0	1	1
South American Games	0	0	2
South American Championships	1	0	0
South American Indoor Championships	2	0	0
Junior Pan American Games	0	2	0
South American U23 Championships	2	0	1
South American U20 Championships	0	1	0
Total	5	4	4
Ibero-American Championships
Silver medal – second place	2024 Cuiabá	4×100 m relay
Bronze medal – third place	2024 Cuiabá	100 m
South American Games
Bronze medal – third place	2022 Asunción	4×400 m relay
Bronze medal – third place	2026 Santa Fe	4×400 m relay
South American Championships
Gold medal – first place	2025 Mar del Plata	4×100 m relay
South American Indoor Championships
Gold medal – first place	2025 Cochabamba	60 m
Gold medal – first place	2026 Cochabamba	4×400 m relay
Junior Pan American Games
Silver medal – second place	2021 Cali-Valle	100 m
Silver medal – second place	2021 Cali-Valle	Mixed relay
South American U23 Championships
Gold medal – first place	2021 Guayaquil	4×100 m relay
Gold medal – first place	2022 Cascavel	4×100 m relay
Bronze medal – third place	2021 Guayaquil	4×400 m relay
South American U20 Championships
Silver medal – second place	2019 Cali	4×400 m relay

Neiker Jesús Abello Sánchez (born 30 March 2000) is a Colombian sprinter. He has won several medals at regional level.

His younger brother Neider Abello is also a sprinter.

== International competitions ==
Year	Competition	Venue	Position	Event	Notes
Representing Colombia
2019	South American U20 Championships	Cali, Colombia	5th	200 m	21.77 s
2019	South American U20 Championships	Cali, Colombia	4th	400 m	47.79 s
2019	South American U20 Championships	Cali, Colombia	2nd	4 × 400 m relay	3:13.43
2021	South American U23 Championships	Guayaquil, Ecuador	4th	100 m	10.49 s
2021	South American U23 Championships	Guayaquil, Ecuador	1st	4 × 100 m relay	39.90 s
2021	South American U23 Championships	Guayaquil, Ecuador	3rd	4 × 400 m relay	3:21.28
2021	Junior Pan American Games (U23)	Cali, Colombia	2nd	100 m	10.36 s
2021	Junior Pan American Games (U23)	Cali, Colombia	—N/a	4 × 100 m relay	DQ
2021	Junior Pan American Games (U23)	Cali, Colombia	2nd	Mixed relay	3:23.79
2022	Bolivarian Games	Valledupar, Colombia	4th	4 × 100 m relay	40.19 s
2022	South American U23 Championships	Cascavel, Brazil	8th	200 m	21.72 s
2022	South American U23 Championships	Cascavel, Brazil	1st	4 × 100 m relay	39.59 s NU23R
2022	South American Games	Asunción, Paraguay	3rd	4 × 400 m relay	3:09.40
2023	South American Championships	São Paulo, Brazil	7th	100 m	10.33 s
2023	South American Championships	São Paulo, Brazil	—N/a	4 × 100 m relay	DNF
2023	Central American and Caribbean Games	San Salvador, El Salvador	4th	4 × 100 m relay	39.45 s
2024	World Relays	Nassau, Bahamas	10th (r)	4 × 100 m relay	39.04 s
2024	Ibero-American Championships	Cuiabá, Brazil	3rd	100 m	10.26 s
2024	Ibero-American Championships	Cuiabá, Brazil	2nd	4 × 100 m relay	39.23 s
2025	South American Indoor Championships	Cochabamba, Bolivia	1st	60 m	6.60 s
2025	South American Championships	Mar del Plata, Argentina	5th	200 m	20.91 s
2025	South American Championships	Mar del Plata, Argentina	1st	4 × 100 m relay	39.58 s
2025	World Relays	Guangzhou, China	10th (r)	4 × 100 m relay	38.84 s
2026	South American Indoor Championships	Cochabamba, Bolivia	4th	60 m	6.68 s
2026	South American Indoor Championships	Cochabamba, Bolivia	1st	4 × 400 m relay	3:16.92 NR
2026	World Relays	Gaborone, Botswana	9th (r)	4 × 100 m relay	39.16 s
2026	Ibero-American Championships	Lima, Peru	11th (h)	100 m	10.39 s
2026	Ibero-American Championships	Lima, Peru	5th	200 m	20.74 s w
2026	Ibero-American Championships	Lima, Peru	—N/a	4 × 100 m relay	DNF
2026	Pan American Championships	Medellín, Colombia	11th (h)	200 m	21.00 s
2026	Central American and Caribbean Games	Santo Domingo, Dominican Republic	4th	4 × 100 m relay	38.17 s NR
2026	Central American and Caribbean Games	Santo Domingo, Dominican Republic	5th	4 × 100 m mixed relay	41.55 s NR
2026	South American Games	Santa Fe, Argentina	10th (h)	200 m	21.24 s

== Personal bests ==
Outdoor

- 100 metres – 10.14 A (+0.5 m/s, Cochabamba 2024)
- 200 metres – 20.61 A (+1.4 m/s, Bogotá 2025)
- 400 metres – 47.32 A (Ibagué 2021)
- 4 × 100 metres relay – 38.17 NR (Santo Domingo 2026)
- 4 × 400 metres relay – 3:09.29 A (Armenia 2023)
- Mixed 4 × 100 metres relay – 41.55 NR (Santo Domingo 2026)
- Mixed 4 × 400 metres relay – 3:23.79 (Cali 2021)

Indoor

- 60 metres – 6.56 A NR (Cochabamba 2025)
