= Luiz Maurício da Silva =

Brazilian javelin thrower (born 2000)

Personal information
- Full name: Luiz Maurício Dias da Silva
- Born: 17 January 2000 (age 26) Juiz de Fora, Brazil

Sport
- Sport: Track and field
- Event: Javelin throw

Achievements and titles
- Personal bests: 91 m AR NR (2025)

Luiz Maurício Dias da Silva (born 17 January 2000) is a Brazilian javelin thrower.

== Career ==
Luiz represented his country at the 2023 World Championships without qualifying for the final.

On June 30, 2024, competing in the Brazil Trophy, held in São Paulo, he achieved a mark of 85.57 m, breaking the South American record for the event and also beating the Olympic index, which was 85.50 m. With this, he obtained a place for the 2024 Summer Olympics.

At the 2024 Summer Olympics, he achieved a mark of 85.91m in the qualification, breaking the South American record again and qualifying for the final in sixth place. It was the first time that a Brazilian qualified for the javelin throw final at the Olympics - in the 1932 Games, Heitor Medina finished in 11th place, when there were no qualifiers for this event. In the final, he did not achieve the same performance as in the qualifying phase, but finished in 11th place with a mark of 80.67m, equaling the best mark in Brazil's history at the Olympics.

At the end of May 2025, while participating in the Kip Keino Classic 2025, in Kenya, he broke a new South American record for the javelin throw, with a mark of 86.34 meters.

On June 20, 2025, at the Paris stage of the Diamond League, he broke the South American record for the javelin throw for the fourth time, with a mark of 86.62 m, finishing in 3rd place in the event.

At the Brazilian Athletics Trophy in August 2025, he achieved a historic feat by smashing his own South American record and becoming the first South American thrower to exceed 90m. He became the second-best javelin thrower in the history of the Americas, behind only Breaux Greer. He achieved a mark of 91m, which would have been a gold medal at every Olympic Games in history except Paris 2024, where he would have won a silver medal. This mark placed him among the 20 best javelin throwers of all time, in 18th position.

At the 2025 World Athletics Championships, he was unable to perform well and finished in 19th place with a mark of 81.12m.

His personal best in the event is 91.00 metres set in São Paulo in Brazilian Athletics Trophy, a South American record.

== International competitions ==
Year	Competition	Venue	Position	Event	Notes
Representing Brazil
2018	World U20 Championships	Tampere, Finland	24th (q)	Javelin throw	60.74 m
2019	South American U20 Championships	Cali, Colombia	1st	Javelin throw	71.17 m
2019	Pan American U20 Championships	San José, Costa Rica	2nd	Javelin throw	74.51 m
2021	South American Championships	Guayaquil, Ecuador	5th	Javelin throw	70.74 m
2021	South American U23 Championships	Guayaquil, Ecuador	1st	Javelin throw	70.73 m
2021	Junior Pan American Games (U23)	Cali, Colombia	2nd	Javelin throw	71.35 m
2022	Ibero-American Championships	La Nucía, Spain	3rd	Javelin throw	80.41 m
2022	South American U23 Championships	Cascavel, Brazil	1st	Javelin throw	78.92 m
2022	South American Games	Asunción, Paraguay	1st	Javelin throw	76.90 m
2023	South American Championships	São Paulo, Brazil	3rd	Javelin throw	77.17 m
2023	World Championships	Budapest, Hungary	20th (q)	Javelin throw	77.70 m
2023	Pan American Games	Santiago, Chile	9th	Javelin throw	68.20 m
2024	Ibero-American Championships	Cuiabá, Brazil	3rd	Javelin throw	82.02 m
2024	Olympic Games	Paris, France	11th	Javelin throw	80.67 m
2025	World Championships	Tokyo, Japan	19th (q)	Javelin throw	81.12 m
