= Eduardo Moreira =

Brazilian middle-distance runner

Personal information
- Full name: Eduardo Ribeiro Moreira
- Born: January 9, 2001 (age 25)
- Height: 1.74 m (5 ft 9 in)
- Weight: 59 kg (130 lb)

Sport
- Sport: Athletics
- Events: 800 metres, 1500 metres
- Club: Atsugi Milers' Club
- Coached by: Clodoaldo do Carmo

Eduardo Ribeiro Moreira (born 9 January 2001) is a Brazilian middle-distance runner specialising in the 800 metres. He represented his country at one outdoor and one indoor World Championships. In addition, he has won several medals at regional level.

== International competitions ==
Year	Competition	Venue	Position	Event	Notes
Representing Brazil
2018	South American U18 Championships	Cuenca, Ecuador	7th	1500 m	4:26.61
2021	South American Championships	Guayaquil, Ecuador	6th	800 m	1:50.72
2021	South American U23 Championships	Guayaquil, Ecuador	1st	800 m	1:47.78
2021	South American U23 Championships	Guayaquil, Ecuador	1st	1500 m	3:48.44
2021	Junior Pan American Games (U23)	Cali, Colombia	3rd	800 m	1:50.21
2022	South American Indoor Championships	Cochabamba, Bolivia	2nd	800 m	1:52.40
2022	Ibero-American Championships	La Nucia, Spain	11th (h)	800 m	1:49.59
2022	Ibero-American Championships	La Nucia, Spain	5th	4 × 400 m relay	3:10.12
2022	South American U23 Championships	Cascavel, Brazil	1st	800 m	1:48.15
2022	South American U23 Championships	Cascavel, Brazil	5th	1500 m	3:47.38
2022	South American Games	Asunción, Paraguay	3rd	800 m	1:47.39
2023	South American Championships	São Paulo, Brazil	1st	800 m	1:47.12
2023	World Championships	Budapest, Hungary	37th (h)	800 m	1:47.75
2023	Pan American Games	Santiago, Chile	8th (h)	800 m	1:48.37
2024	South American Indoor Championships	Cochabamba, Bolivia	–	800 m	DQ
2024	World Indoor Championships	Glasgow, United Kingdom	26th (h)	800 m	1:49.74
2024	Ibero-American Championships	Cuiabá, Brazil	6th	800 m	1:47.77
2025	South American Championships	Mar del Plata, Argentina	1st	800 m	1:50.46
2025	World Championships	Tokyo, Japan	59th (h)	800 m	1:50.40
2026	South American Indoor Championships	Cochabamba, Bolivia	1st	800 m	1:47.58
2026	Ibero-American Championships	Lima, Peru	2nd	800 m	1:46.56
2026	Pan American Championships	Medellín, Colombia	1st	800 m	1:45.07
2026	South American Games	Santa Fe, Argentina	8th	800 m	1:51.00

== Personal bests ==
Outdoor

- 400 metres – 47.87 (São Paulo 2023)
- 800 metres – 1:45.10 (Bragança Paulista 2023)
- 1500 metres – 3:46.03 (Rio de Janeiro 2022)

Indoor

- 800 metres – 1:49.74 (Glasgow 2024)
