= Franco Florio (athlete) =

Argentine sprinter (born 2000)

Personal information
- Born: May 30, 2000 (age 26)
- Height: 1.80 m (5 ft 11 in)
- Weight: 80 kg (176 lb)

Sport
- Sport: Athletics; Rugby sevens
- Events: 60 metres; 100 metres
Medal record
Representing Argentina
Men's athletics
Pan American Games
| Bronze medal – third place | 2023 Santiago | 4×100 m relay |

Franco Florio (born 30 May 2000) is an Argentine sprinter and rugby sevens player. He has won several medals in athletics at regional level.

== Athletics international competitions ==
| Year | Competition | Venue | Position | Event | Notes |
Representing Argentina
| 2019 | South American U20 Championships | Cali, Colombia | 5th | 100 m | 10.63 |
| 2020 | South American Indoor Championships | Cochabamba, Bolivia | 3rd | 60 m | 6.85 |
| 2020 | South American Indoor Championships | Cochabamba, Bolivia | 3rd | 200 m | 21.89 |
| 2020 | South American Indoor Championships | Cochabamba, Bolivia | 3rd | 4 × 400 m relay | 3:29.45 |
| 2021 | South American Championships | Guayaquil, Ecuador | 5th | 100 m | 10.49 (w) |
| 2021 | South American Championships | Guayaquil, Ecuador | – | 4 × 100 m relay | DQ |
| 2021 | South American U23 Championships | Guayaquil, Ecuador | 6th | 100 m | 10.58 |
| 2021 | South American U23 Championships | Guayaquil, Ecuador | 6th | 200 m | 21.40 |
| 2021 | South American U23 Championships | Guayaquil, Ecuador | 3rd | 4 × 100 m relay | 41.29 |
| 2021 | Junior Pan American Games (U23) | Cali, Colombia | 3rd | 100 m | 10.37 |
| 2021 | Junior Pan American Games (U23) | Cali, Colombia | 3rd | 4 × 100 m relay | 40.63 |
| 2022 | South American Indoor Championships | Cochabamba, Bolivia | 3rd | 100 m | 6.70 |
| 2022 | Ibero-American Championships | La Nucía, Spain | 3rd | 100 m | 10.31 |
| 2022 | South American U23 Championships | Cascavel, Brazil | 2nd | 100 m | 10.11 NR |
| 2022 | South American U23 Championships | Cascavel, Brazil | 3rd | 4 × 100 m relay | 39.99 |
| 2022 | South American Games | Asunción, Paraguay | 1st | 100 m | 10.35 |
| 2023 | South American Championships | São Paulo, Brazil | 9th (h) | 100 m | 10.40 |
| 2023 | South American Championships | São Paulo, Brazil | 4th | 4 × 100 m relay | 39.85 |
| 2023 | Pan American Games | Santiago, Chile | 12th (h) | 100 m | 10.52 |
| 2023 | Pan American Games | Santiago, Chile | 3rd | 4 × 100 m relay | 39.48 |
| 2024 | Ibero-American Championships | Cuiabá, Brazil | 7th | 100 m | 10.39 |
| 2024 | Ibero-American Championships | Cuiabá, Brazil | 3rd | 4 × 100 m relay | 39.85 |
| 2025 | South American Indoor Championships | Cochabamba, Bolivia | 3rd | 60 m | 6.67 |
| 2025 | World Indoor Championships | Nanjing, China | 33rd (h) | 60 m | 6.76 |
| 2025 | South American Championships | Mar del Plata, Argentina | 6th | 100 m | 10.34 |
| 2025 | South American Championships | Mar del Plata, Argentina | 4th | 4 × 100 m relay | 39.91 |
| 2026 | South American Indoor Championships | Cochabamba, Bolivia | 7th | 60 m | 6.77 |

== Personal bests ==
Outdoor

- 100 metres – 10.11 (+0.5 m/s, Cascavel 2022) NR
- 200 metres – 21.40 (-0.7 m/s, Guayaquil 2021)

Indoor

- 60 metres – 6.67 (Jablonec 2025) NR
- 200 metres – 21.89 (Cochabamba 2020)
