= Carlos Flórez =

Colombian sprinter (born 2003)

Personal information
- Full name: Carlos Yesid Flórez Angulo
- Nationality: Colombian
- Born: May 26, 2003 (age 23)

Sport
- Country: Colombia
- Sport: Athletics
- Events: 60 metres; 100 metres; 200 metres; 4×100 metres; 4×100 metres mixed
- Club: Liga del Valle del Cauca

Achievements and titles
- Personal bests: 60 metres: 6.81 (2026); 100 metres: 10.00 (2025); 200 metres: 20.52 (2025); 4×100 metres: 38.17 NR (2026); 4×100 metres mixed: 41.55 NR (2026)
Medal record
Representing Colombia
Men's athletics
Event	1st	2nd	3rd
Pan American Championships	0	0	2
Ibero-American Championships	0	1	0
South American Games	1	0	2
South American Championships	1	0	1
Junior Pan American Games	1	0	0
South American U23 Championships	5	0	0
Total	8	1	5
Pan American Championships
Bronze medal – third place	2026 Medellín	4×100 m relay
Bronze medal – third place	2026 Medellín	4×100 m mixed relay
Ibero-American Championships
Silver medal – second place	2024 Cuiabá	4×100 m relay
South American Games
Gold medal – first place	2026 Santa Fe	4×100 m relay
Bronze medal – third place	2022 Asunción	4×100 m relay
Bronze medal – third place	2026 Santa Fe	4×100 m mixed relay
South American Championships
Gold medal – first place	2025 Mar del Plata	4×100 m relay
Bronze medal – third place	2025 Mar del Plata	100 m
Junior Pan American Games
Gold medal – first place	2025 Asunción	4×100 m relay
South American U23 Championships
Gold medal – first place	2021 Guayaquil	4×100 m relay
Gold medal – first place	2022 Cascavel	4×100 m relay
Gold medal – first place	2024 Bucaramanga	100 m
Gold medal – first place	2024 Bucaramanga	200 m
Gold medal – first place	2024 Bucaramanga	4×100 m relay

Carlos Yesid Flórez Angulo (born 26 May 2003) is a Colombian sprinter. He has won several medals at regional level.

== International competitions ==
Year	Competition	Venue	Position	Event	Notes
Representing Colombia
2021	South American U20 Championships	Guayaquil, Ecuador	4th	4 × 100 m relay	41.47 s
2021	World U20 Championships	Nairobi, Kenya	5th	4 × 100 m relay	40.00 s NU20R
2021	South American U23 Championships	Guayaquil, Ecuador	1st	4 × 100 m relay	39.90 s
2021	Junior Pan American Games (U23)	Cali, Colombia	8th	100 m	10.78 s
2022	World U20 Championships	Cali, Colombia	18th (sf)	100 m	10.45 s
2022	World U20 Championships	Cali, Colombia	—N/a	4 × 100 m relay	DQ
2022	South American U23 Championships	Cascavel, Brazil	5th	100 m	10.52 s
2022	South American U23 Championships	Cascavel, Brazil	1st	4 × 100 m relay	39.59 s NU23R
2022	South American Games	Asunción, Paraguay	3rd	4 × 100 m relay	39.74 s
2024	World Relays	Nassau, Bahamas	10th (r)	4 × 100 m relay	39.04 s
2024	Ibero-American Championships	Cuiabá, Brazil	2nd	4 × 100 m relay	39.23 s
2024	South American U23 Championships	Bucaramanga, Colombia	1st	100 m	10.19 s
2024	South American U23 Championships	Bucaramanga, Colombia	1st	200 m	21.08 s
2024	South American U23 Championships	Bucaramanga, Colombia	1st	4 × 100 m relay	39.74 s
2025	South American Championships	Mar del Plata, Argentina	3rd	100 m	10.17 s
2025	South American Championships	Mar del Plata, Argentina	1st	4 × 100 m relay	39.58 s
2025	World Relays	Guangzhou, China	10th (r)	4 × 100 m relay	38.84 s
2025	Junior Pan American Games (U23)	Asunción, Paraguay	7th	100 m	10.29 s
2025	Junior Pan American Games (U23)	Asunción, Paraguay	1st	4 × 100 m relay	38.99 s JPR, AU23R
2025	World Championships	Tokyo, Japan	48th (h)	100 m	10.42 s
2025	Bolivarian Games	Lima, Peru	5th	100 m	10.66 s
2026	Pan American Championships	Medellín, Colombia	17th (h)	100 m	10.47 s
2026	Pan American Championships	Medellín, Colombia	3rd	4 × 100 m relay	38.85 s
2026	Pan American Championships	Medellín, Colombia	3rd	4 × 100 m mixed relay	41.63 s NR
2026	Central American and Caribbean Games	Santo Domingo, Dominican Republic	11th (sf)	100 m	10.36 s
2026	Central American and Caribbean Games	Santo Domingo, Dominican Republic	4th	4 × 100 m relay	38.17 s NR
2026	Central American and Caribbean Games	Santo Domingo, Dominican Republic	5th	4 × 100 m mixed relay	41.55 s NR
2026	South American Games	Santa Fe, Argentina	1st	4 × 100 m relay	39.09 s
2026	South American Games	Santa Fe, Argentina	3rd	4 × 100 m mixed relay	42.37 s

== Personal bests ==
- 60 metres – 6.81 (-1.6 m/s, Moscow 2026)
- 100 metres – 10.00 A (+0.6 m/s, Cochabamba 2025)
- 200 metres – 20.52 A (+1.9 m/s, Quito 2025)
- 4 × 100 metres relay – 38.17 NR (Santo Domingo 2026)
- Mixed 4 × 100 metres relay – 41.55 NR (Santo Domingo 2026)
