= Marlet Ospino =

Colombian sprinter

Personal information
- Full name: Marlet Ospino Ramos
- Nationality: Colombian
- Born: 6 September 2004 (age 22)

Sport
- Country: Colombia
- Sport: Athletics
- Events: 60 metres; 100 metres; 200 metres; 4×100 metres; 4×400 metres; 4×100 metres mixed
- Club: Liga de Atlántico

Achievements and titles
- Personal bests: 60 metres: 7.22 NR (2025); 100 metres: 11.22 (2025); 200 metres: 22.73 AU23R (2026); 4×100 metres: 43.55 (2025); 4×400 metres: 3:38.20 (2025); 4×100 metres mixed: 41.55 NR (2026)
Medal record
Representing Colombia
Women's athletics
Event	1st	2nd	3rd
World U20 Championships	0	0	1
Ibero-American Championships	0	2	0
South American Games	2	0	0
South American Indoor Championships	0	1	0
Bolivarian Games	1	1	0
Junior Pan American Games	0	1	1
South American U23 Championships	1	1	1
South American U18 Championships	1	1	1
Total	5	7	4
Ibero-American Championships
Silver medal – second place	2024 Cuiabá	4×100 m relay
Silver medal – second place	2026 Lima	200 m
South American Games
Gold medal – first place	2026 Santa Fe	4×100 m relay
Gold medal – first place	2026 Santa Fe	4×400 m relay
South American Indoor Championships
Silver medal – second place	2025 Cochabamba	60 m
Bolivarian Games
Gold medal – first place	2025 Lima-Ayacucho	4×100 m relay
Silver medal – second place	2025 Lima-Ayacucho	4×100 m mixed relay
World U20 Championships
Bronze medal – third place	2022 Cali	4×100 m relay
Junior Pan American Games
Silver medal – second place	2025 Asunción	200 m
Bronze medal – third place	2025 Asunción	4×100 m relay
South American U23 Championships
Gold medal – first place	2024 Bucaramanga	200 m
Silver medal – second place	2024 Bucaramanga	100 m
Bronze medal – third place	2022 Cascavel	4×100 m relay
South American U18 Championships
Gold medal – first place	2021 Encarnación	4×100 m relay
Silver medal – second place	2021 Encarnación	200 m
Bronze medal – third place	2021 Encarnación	8×300 m relay

Marlet Ospino Ramos (born 6 September 2004) is a Colombian sprinter. She is the national record holder over 60 metres, and in 2025 became national champion over 100 metres.

== Career ==
Ospino is from Barranquilla. She was a bronze medalist in the women's 4 x 100 metres at the 2022 World Athletics U20 Championships in Cali, Colombia.

She ran as part of the 4 × 100 m relay team at the 2024 World Relays Championships in Nassau, Bahamas. She won the silver medal in the 100 metres and the gold medal in the 200 metres at the 2024 South American Under-23 Championships in Bucaramanga, Colombia in September 2024.

She equalled her Colombian national record of 7.22 seconds to win the silver medal behind Ana Carolina Azevedo of Brazil at the 2025 South American Indoor Championships in Cochabamba in February 2025.

She won the 100 metres at the Colombian Athletics Championships in August 2025, in 11.22 seconds. She was a silver medalist in the 200 metres at the 2025 Junior Pan America Games in Luque, Paraguay.

In September 2025, she competed in the 100 metres at the 2025 World Championships in Tokyo, Japan.

== International competitions ==
Year	Competition	Venue	Position	Event	Result
Representing Colombia
2021	South American U18 Championships	Encarnación, Paraguay	2nd	200 m	25.21 s
2021	South American U18 Championships	Encarnación, Paraguay	1st	4 × 100 m relay	46.18 s
2021	South American U18 Championships	Encarnación, Paraguay	3rd	8 × 300 m relay	5:16:39
2022	World U20 Championships	Cali, Colombia	3rd	4 × 100 m relay	44.59 s
2022	South American U23 Championships	Cascavel, Brazil	3rd	4 × 100 m relay	44.74 s
2023	South American U20 Championships	Bogotá, Colombia	4th	100 m	11.71 s
2023	Central American and Caribbean Games	San Salvador, El Salvador	—N/a	4 × 100 m relay	DQ
2024	World Relays	Nassau, Bahamas	14th (r)	4 × 100 m relay	43.92 s
2024	Ibero-American Championships	Cuiabá, Brazil	2nd	4 × 100 m relay	44.34 s
2024	South American U23 Championships	Bucaramanga, Colombia	2nd	100 m	11.54 s
2024	South American U23 Championships	Bucaramanga, Colombia	1st	200 m	23.25 s
2024	South American U23 Championships	Bucaramanga, Colombia	—N/a	4 × 100 m relay	DNF
2025	South American Indoor Championships	Cochabamba, Bolivia	2nd	60 m	7.22 s =NR
2025	South American Championships	Mar del Plata, Argentina	7th	100 m	11.44 s
2025	South American Championships	Mar del Plata, Argentina	—N/a	4 × 100 m relay	DNF
2025	Junior Pan American Games (U23)	Asunción, Paraguay	6th	100 m	11.65 s
2025	Junior Pan American Games (U23)	Asunción, Paraguay	2nd	200 m	23.14 s
2025	Junior Pan American Games (U23)	Asunción, Paraguay	3rd	4 × 100 m relay	44.01 s
2025	World Championships	Tokyo, Japan	49th (h)	100 m	11.63 s
2025	Bolivarian Games	Lima, Peru	5th	100 m	11.74 s
2025	Bolivarian Games	Lima, Peru	—N/a	200 m	DQ
2025	Bolivarian Games	Lima, Peru	1st	4 × 100 m relay	44.00 s
2025	Bolivarian Games	Lima, Peru	2nd	4 × 100 m mixed relay	42.05 s NR
2026	Ibero-American Championships	Lima, Peru	5th	100 m	11.31 s
2026	Ibero-American Championships	Lima, Peru	2nd	200 m	22.83 s w
2026	Central American and Caribbean Games	Santo Domingo, Dominican Republic	—N/a	200 m	DQ
2026	Central American and Caribbean Games	Santo Domingo, Dominican Republic	5th	4 × 100 m relay	43.92 s
2026	Central American and Caribbean Games	Santo Domingo, Dominican Republic	5th	4 × 100 m mixed relay	41.55 s NR
2026	South American Games	Santa Fe, Argentina	8th	100 m	11.81 s
2026	South American Games	Santa Fe, Argentina		200 m	–
2026	South American Games	Santa Fe, Argentina		4 × 100 m relay	–
2026	South American Games	Santa Fe, Argentina		4 × 400 m relay	–
