= Valentina Barrios =

Colombian javelin thrower (born 2003)

Personal information
- Full name: Valentina Barrios Bornacelli
- Born: December 2, 2003 (age 22) Barranquilla, Colombia
- Parent: Juana Maria Bornacelli (mother)

Sport
- Country: Colombia
- Sport: Athletics
- Events: Triple jump; Discus throw; Javelin throw

Achievements and titles
- Personal best: Javelin throw: 62.00 m (2025) NU23R
Medal record
Representing Colombia
Women's athletics
Event	1st	2nd	3rd
World U20 Championships	0	1	0
Pan American Championships	1	0	0
CAC Games	0	1	0
Junior Pan American Games	1	0	1
South American U23 Championships	0	3	0
South American U20 Championships	1	0	0
NCAA Division I Championships	1	0	0
Total	4	5	1
Pan American Championships
Gold medal – first place	2026 Medellín	Javelin throw
Central American and Caribbean Games
Silver medal – second place	2026 Santo Domingo	Javelin throw
World U20 Championships
Silver medal – second place	2022 Cali	Javelin throw
Junior Pan American Games
Gold medal – first place	2025 Asunción	Javelin throw
Bronze medal – third place	2021 Cali-Valle	Javelin throw
South American U23 Championships
Silver medal – second place	2021 Guayaquil	Javelin throw
Silver medal – second place	2022 Cascavel	Javelin throw
Silver medal – second place	2024 Bucaramanga	Javelin throw
South American U20 Championships
Gold medal – first place	2021 Lima	Javelin throw
NCAA Division I Championships
Gold medal – first place	2025 Eugene	Javelin throw
- Updated on 7 September 2025

Valentina Barrios Bornacelli (born 2 December 2003) is a Colombian javelin thrower.

== Biography ==
She finished fifth at the 2021 World Athletics U20 Championships in Nairobi, Kenya in the women's javelin throw in August 2021. She was a silver medalist at the 2021 South American U23 Championships in Guayaquil, Ecuador. She won a bronze medal at the 2021 Junior Pan American Games.

She was silver medalist at the 2022 World Athletics U20 Championships in Cali, Colombia in the women's javelin throw in August 2022. She was a silver medalist at the 2022 South American U23 Championships in Cascavel, Brazil.

As a freshman, Barrios competed for the Washington State Cougars track and field team in the NCAA.

She won the 2025 NCAA Outdoor Championships in Eugene, Oregon in June 2025, competing for the University of Missouri, with a personal best throw of 62.00 metres. She made the throw in the final round to move from fourth to first place, and measured at 15 feet longer than any of her other throws in the competition. She competed at the 2025 World Athletics Championships in Tokyo, Japan, advancing to the final and placing eleventh overall.

In June 2026, she placed fourth with a throw of 57.17 metres at the NCAA Championships. Later that month, she won the gold medal at the 2026 Pan American Championships in Medellín, with a throw of 60.72 metres. In August, she won the silver medal at the 2026 CAC Games with 58.14 metres.

== Personal life ==
She is from Barranquilla, Colombia.

== International competitions ==
Year	Competition	Venue	Position	Event	Notes
Representing Colombia
2021	South American U20 Championships	Lima, Peru	1st	Javelin throw	47.97 m
2021	World U20 Championships	Nairobi, Kenya	5th	Javelin throw	54.43 m
2021	South American U23 Championships	Guayaquil, Ecuador	2nd	Javelin throw	53.59 m
2021	Junior Pan American Games (U23)	Cali, Colombia	3rd	Javelin throw	51.46 m
2022	NCAA Division I Championships	Eugene, Oregon, United States	8th	Javelin throw	54.03 m
2022	World U20 Championships	Cali, Colombia	2nd	Javelin throw	57.84 m NU20R
2022	South American U23 Championships	Cascavel, Brazil	2nd	Javelin throw	57.31 m
2024	South American U23 Championships	Bucaramanga, Colombia	2nd	Javelin throw	53.61 m
2025	NCAA Division I Championships	Eugene, Oregon, United States	1st	Javelin throw	62.00 m NU23R
2025	Junior Pan American Games (U23)	Asunción, Paraguay	1st	Javelin throw	60.16 m JGR
2025	World Championships	Tokyo, Japan	11th	Javelin throw	59.14 m
2026	NCAA Division I Championships	Eugene, Oregon, United States	4th	Javelin throw	57.17 m
2026	Pan American Championships	Medellín, Colombia	1st	Javelin throw	60.72 m
2026	Central American and Caribbean Games	Santo Domingo, Dominican Republic	2nd	Javelin throw	58.14 m
