= 2022 South American Under-23 Championships in Athletics =

X South American Under-23 Championships in Athletics
- Dates: 29 September – 2 October
- Host city: Cascavel, Brazil
- Venue: Estádio do Centro Nacional de Treinamento de Atletismo
- Level: Under-23
- Events: 45
- Participation: 259 athletes from 11 nations
- Records set: 8 CRs

The 2022 South American Under-23 Championships in Athletics was the tenth edition of the biennial track and field competition for South American athletes aged under 23 years old, organised by Atletismo Sudamericano. It was held in Cascavel, Brazil, between 29 September and 2 October.

== Medal summary ==
=== Men ===
| Event | Gold | | Silver | | Bronze | |
|---|---|---|---|---|---|---|
| 100 metres (wind: +0.5 m/s) | Erik Cardoso (BRA) | 10.08 CR | Franco Florio (ARG) | 10.11 | Ronal Longa (COL) | 10.30 |
| 200 metres (wind: +1.1 m/s) | Renan Gallina (BRA) | 20.15 CR | Lucas da Silva (BRA) | 20.42 | Anderson Marquinez (ECU) | 20.88 |
| 400 metres | Elián Larregina (ARG) | 45.53 | Douglas da Silva (BRA) | 46.59 | Lucas Vilar (BRA) | 46.77 |
| 800 metres | Eduardo Moreira (BRA) | 1:48.15 | Leonardo de Jesus (BRA) | 1:48.71 | Marco Vilca (PER) | 1:49.69 |
| 1500 metres | Sebastián López (VEN) | 3:44.56 | Joaquin Campos (CHI) | 3:45.80 | Jânio Varjão (BRA) | 3:46.57 |
| 5000 metres | David Ninavia (BOL) | 14:39.91 | Valentín Soca (URU) | 14:41.06 | Julio Palomino (PER) | 14:42.83 |
| 10,000 metres | David Ninavia (BOL) | 30:05.08 | Frank Lujan (PER) | 30:34.54 | Valentín Soca (URU) | 30:44.32 |
| 110 metres hurdles (wind: +0.8 m/s) | Adrian Vieira (BRA) | 13.74 CR | Martín Sáenz (CHI) | 13.91 | Fabricio Pereira (BRA) | 13.93 |
| 400 metres hurdles | Bruno de Genaro (ARG) | 50.55 | Matheus da Silva (BRA) | 50.87 | Egbert Espinoza (VEN) | 51.68 |
| 3000 metres steeplechase | Julio Palomino (PER) | 9:18.90 | Matheus Borges (BRA) | 9:29.01 | Natan Nepomuceno (BRA) | 9:37.00 |
| 4 × 100 m relay | Colombia (COL); Neiker Abello; Carlos Flórez; Óscar Baltán; Ronal Longa | 39.59 | Brazil (BRA); Lucas Antunes; Renan Gallina; Lucas da Silva; Erik Cardoso | 39.61 | Argentina (ARG); Alejo Pafundi; Matias Falchetti; Juan Ignacio Ciampitti; Franco Florio | 39.99 |
| 4 × 400 m relay | Argentina (ARG); Pedro Emmert; Bruno de Genaro; Matias Falchetti; Elián Larregina | 3:04.39 CR, NR | Brazil (BRA); Elias dos Santos; Lucas Vilar; Douglas da Silva; Marcos Morães | 3:05.44 | Ecuador (ECU); Lenin Sánchez; Alan Minda; Anderson Marquinez; Steeven Salas | 3:09.51 |
| 20,000 m walk | Paulo Ribeiro (BRA) | 1:29.53 | Sebastián Giuliani (ARG) | 1:37.11 | Heron Miranda (BRA) | 1:45.38 |
| High jump | Elton Petronilho (BRA) | 2.15 m | Pedro Alamos (CHI) | 2.15 m | Nicolas Numair (CHI) | 2.13 m |
| Pole vault | Dyander Pacho (ECU) | 5.10 m | Guillermo Correa (CHI) | 5.00 m | Andreas Kreiss (BRA) | 4.80 m |
| Long jump | Jhon Berrío (COL) | 7.70 m (w) | Gabriel Luiz Boza (BRA) | 7.60 m (w) | Matias González (CHI) | 7.47 m (w) |
| Triple jump | Elton Petronilho (BRA) | 16.37 m | Geiner Moreno (COL) | 16.37 m | Felipe da Silva (BRA) | 16.16 m |
| Shot put | Nazareno Sasia (ARG) | 19.76 m | Marcelo Lopes (BRA) | 17.44 m | Juan Manuel Arrieguez (ARG) | 17.21 m |
| Discus throw | Nazareno Sasia (ARG) | 57.26 m | Luis Fabio Rodrigues (BRA) | 50.77 m | Mateus Torres (BRA) | 49.25 m |
| Hammer throw | Daniel Leal (CHI) | 64.46 m | Sebastián Tommasi (ARG) | 62.00 m | Tomas Olivera (ARG) | 61.75 m |
| Javelin throw | Luiz Maurício da Silva (BRA) | 78.92 m CR | Antonio Ortiz (PAR) | 73.15 m | Jean Marcos Mairongo (ECU) | 70.73 m |
| Decathlon | Julio Angulo (COL) | 7169 pts | Henrique Frazão (BRA) | 6689 pts | Damian Moretta (ARG) | 6683 pts |

=== Women ===
| Event | Gold | | Silver | | Bronze | |
|---|---|---|---|---|---|---|
| 100 metres (wind: +0.5 m/s) | Anahí Suárez (ECU) | 11.37 | Vida Caetano (BRA) | 11.55 | Martina Coronato (URU) | 11.71 |
| 200 metres (wind: +1.2 m/s) | Anahí Suárez (ECU) | 23.09 | Orangys Jiménez (VEN) | 23.27 | Leticia Lim (BRA) | 23.56 |
| 400 metres | Nicole Caicedo (ECU) | 53.91 | Maria Victoria de Sena (BRA) | 54.11 | Giovana dos Santos (BRA) | 54.67 |
| 800 metres | Berdine Castillo (CHI) | 2:09.61 | Isabelle de Almeida (BRA) | 2:10.02 | Lindsey Lopes (PER) | 2:10.31 |
| 1500 metres | Shellcy Sarmiento (COL) | 4:48.76 | Stefany López (COL) | 4:49.71 | Mirelle da Silva (BRA) | 4:49.99 |
| 5000 metres | Maria Lucineida Moreira (BRA) | 16:45.90 | Shellcy Sarmiento (COL) | 16:57.78 | Nubia Silva (BRA) | 16:58.74 |
| 10,000 metres | Sofia Mamani (PER) | 34:28.33 CR | Maria Lucineida Moreira (BRA) | 34:45.29 | Nubia Silva (BRA) | 35:19.76 |
| 100 metres hurdles (wind: +1.8 m/s) | Lays Silva (BRA) | 13.57 | Valentina Polanco (ARG) | 13.75 | Elisa Keitel (CHI) | 13.86 |
| 400 metres hurdles | Chayenne da Silva (BRA) | 57.51 | Valeria Cabezas (COL) | 58.12 | Camille de Oliveira (BRA) | 60.09 |
| 3000 metres steeplechase | Mirelle da Silva (BRA) | 10:32.79 | Stefany López (COL) | 10:46.78 | Veronica Huacasi (PER) | 10:56.73 |
| 4 × 100 m relay | Ecuador (ECU); Aimara Nazareno; Anahí Suárez; Nicole Caicedo; Jazmin Chala | 44.50 | Brazil (BRA); Sabrina Costa; Leticia Lima; Vida Caetano; Vanessa dos Santos | 44.57 | Colombia (COL); Shelsy Romero; Marlet Ospino; Shary Vallecilla; María Alejandra Murillo | 44.74 |
| 4 × 400 m relay | Brazil (BRA); Leticia de Oliveira; Erica Cavalheiro; Giovana dos Santos; Maria Victoria de Sena | 3:37.79 | Ecuador (ECU); Jazmin Chala; Evelin Mercado; Aimara Nazareno; Nicole Caicedo | 3:47.12 | Chile (CHI); Rocío Muñoz; Andrea Jara; Anaís Hernández; Berdine Castillo | 3:47.64 |
| 20,000 m walk | Paula Milena Torres (ECU) | 1:34.52 | Laura Chalarca (COL) | 1:39.17 | Mayra Quispe (BOL) | 1:40.05 |
| High jump | Arielly Rodrigues (BRA) | 1.76 m | Gabriela de Sá (BRA) | 1.76 m | Antonia Merino (CHI) | 1.74 m |
| Pole vault | Sophia Salvi (BRA) | 4.11 m | Carolina Scarponi (ARG) | 3.95 m | Luna Nazarit (COL) | 3.90 m |
| Long jump | Rocío Muñoz (CHI) | 6.32 m | Lissandra Campos (BRA) | 6.31 m | Vanessa dos Santos (BRA) | 6.15 m |
| Triple jump | Valery Arce (COL) | 12.95 m | Ana Paula Arguello (PAR) | 12.75 m | Whaylla de Oliveira (BRA) | 12.70 m |
| Shot put | Rafaela de Sousa (BRA) | 15.87 m | Lorna Zurita (ECU) | 15.59 m | Taniele da Silva (BRA) | 13.92 m |
| Discus throw | Marya Botega Netto (BRA) | 47.59 m | Valentina Ulloa (CHI) | 47.20 m | Yasmin Piske (BRA) | 46.39 m |
| Hammer throw | Ximena Zorrilla (PER) | 63.71 m | Nereida Santacruz (ECU) | 61.45 m | Tânia da Silva (BRA) | 57.44 m |
| Javelin throw | Juleisy Angulo (ECU) | 58.83 m CR | Valentina Barrios (COL) | 57.31 m | Yiset Jiménez (COL) | 54.14 m |
| Heptathlon | Paloma Cardoso (BRA) | 4185 pts | Stefany da Silva (BRA) | 2867 pts | Only two competitors | |

=== Mixed ===
| Event | Gold | | Silver | | Bronze | |
|---|---|---|---|---|---|---|
| 4 × 400 m relay | Ecuador (ECU); Steeven Salas; Evelin Mercado; Alan Minda; Nicole Caicedo | 3:23.28 CR | Argentina (ARG); Agustín Pinti; Camila Roffo; Bruno de Genaro; Agustina Salazar | 3:31.97 | Venezuela (VEN); Allan Gregorio Cortesia; Genesis Gutierrez; Jose Chourio; Ibeyis Romero | 3:41.57 |

== Medal table ==
* Host nation (Brazil)

| Rank | Nation | Gold | Silver | Bronze | Total |
|---|---|---|---|---|---|
| 1 | Brazil (BRA)* | 18 | 19 | 19 | 56 |
| 2 | Ecuador (ECU) | 8 | 3 | 3 | 14 |
| 3 | Colombia (COL) | 5 | 7 | 4 | 16 |
| 4 | Argentina (ARG) | 5 | 6 | 4 | 15 |
| 5 | Chile (CHI) | 3 | 5 | 5 | 13 |
| 6 | Peru (PER) | 3 | 1 | 4 | 8 |
| 7 | Bolivia (BOL) | 2 | 0 | 1 | 3 |
| 8 | Venezuela (VEN) | 1 | 1 | 2 | 4 |
| 9 | Paraguay (PAR) | 0 | 2 | 0 | 2 |
| 10 | Uruguay (URU) | 0 | 1 | 2 | 3 |
| Totals (10 entries) | | 45 | 45 | 44 | 134 |

== Participation ==
- Argentina (32)
- Bolivia (10)
- Brazil (76)
- Chile (23)
- Colombia (22)
- Ecuador (25)
- Panama (1)
- Paraguay (29)
- Peru (21)
- Uruguay (10)
- Venezuela (10)
