= Lars Flaming =

Paraguayan javelin thrower (born 2003)

Personal information
- Full name: Lars Anthony Flaming Lepp
- Born: 27 February 2003 (age 23)

Sport
- Sport: Athletics
- Event: Javelin throw

Achievements and titles
- Personal bests: Javelin: 82.10 (Medellín, 2026)
Medal record
Men's athletics
Representing Paraguay
Pan American Championships
Gold medal – first place	2026 Medellín	Javelin throw
South American Games
Gold medal – first place	2026 Santa Fe	Javelin throw
South American Championships
Bronze medal – third place	2025 Mar del Plata	Javelin throw
Bolivarian Games
Silver medal – second place	2025 Lima-Ayacucho	Javelin throw
Junior Pan American Games
Gold medal – first place	2025 Asunción	Javelin throw
South American U23 Championships
Gold medal – first place	2024 Bucaramanga	Javelin throw
South American U20 Championships
Silver medal – second place	2021 Lima	Javelin throw

Lars Anthony Flaming Lepp (born 27 February 2003) is a Paraguayan javelin thrower. He was the 2024 South American U23 Champion and won the gold medal at the 2025 Junior Pan American Games and 2026 Pan American Championships. He represented Paraguay at the 2025 World Championships

== Biography ==
Flaming is from Filadelfia, in the Boquerón Department of the Gran Chaco of western Paraguay. He competed as a multi-event athlete prior to specialising in the javelin throw by 2021. He placed fourth in the javelin throw at the 2023 South American Championships in Athletics in São Paulo, Brazil, in July 2023. He won the gold medal at the 2024 South American U23 Championships in Bucaramanga, Colombia.

In March 2025, he set a new Paraguayan U23 national record with a throw of 79.74 meters, surpassing the previous record set by Victor Fatecha in 2007. He won the bronze medal in the javelin throw at the 2025 South American Championships in Athletics in Mar del Plata, Argentina, in April 2025. In August 2025, he won the men’s javelin throw at the 2025 Junior Pan American Games in Asunción, with a first throw of 79.05 meters which set a new Junior Pan American record before sealing victory with his sixth and final throw, in which he surpassed his own record with a new personal best of 81.56 metres.

He competed for Paraguay at the 2025 World Athletics Championships in Tokyo, Japan, throwing 79.07 metres without advancing to the final.

Flaming won the gold medal at the 2026 Pan American Championships in Athletics in Medellín, with 82.10 metres.
