= 2024 South American Under-23 Championships in Athletics =

XI South American Under-23 Championships in Athletics
- Dates: 27–29 September
- Host city: Bucaramanga, Colombia
- Venue: Estadio de Atletismo La Flora
- Level: Under-23
- Events: 45
- Participation: 252 athletes from 12 nations
- Records set: 3 CR

The 2024 South American Under-23 Championships in Athletics was the eleventh edition of the biennial track and field competition for South American athletes aged under 23 years old, organised by Atletismo Sudamericano. It was held in Bucaramanga, Colombia, between 27 and 29 September.

== Medal summary ==
=== Men ===
Event	Gold		Silver		Bronze	
100 metres (wind: +0.8 m/s)	Carlos Flórez (COL)	10.19	Tomás Villegas (ARG)	10.41	Hygor Soares (BRA)	10.44
200 metres (wind: ? m/s)	Carlos Flórez (COL)	21.08	Tomás Villegas (ARG)	21.19	Katriel Angulo (ECU)	21.42
400 metres	Daniel Balanta (COL)	46.30 PB	Jadson Lima (BRA)	46.45	Martín Koudjoumdjian (CHI)	46.95
800 metres	Leonardo de Jesus (BRA)	1:47.76	Victor Santos (BRA)	1:50.13	Klaus Scholz (CHI)	1:50.35
1500 metres	Leonardo de Jesus (BRA)	3:43.55 CR	Janio Varjão (BRA)	3:44.09	Ericky dos Santos (PAR)	3:44.72
5000 metres	Janio Varjão (BRA)	14:52.62	Jonathan Molina (PER)	14:57.57	Vinícius Alves (BRA)	15:03.98
10,000 metres	Jonathan Molina (PER)	30:54.43	Alex Caiza (ECU)	31:05.52	Ignacio Carrizo (CHI)	31:09.81
110 metres hurdles (wind: +0.5 m/s)	Thiago dos Santos (BRA)	13.82	Fabricio Pereira (BRA)	13.92	Gerónimo Canizales (COL)	13.95 PB
400 metres hurdles	Matheus Lima (BRA)	49.13	Neider Abello (COL)	50.34 PB	Ramón Fuenzalida (CHI)	51.31
3000 metres steeplechase	Vinícius Alves (BRA)	9:07.38	Mateus de Alencar (BRA)	9:12.81	Diego Caldeira (VEN)	9:21.67
4 × 100 m relay	Colombia (COL); Luis Hernández; Carlos Flórez; Óscar Baltán; Enoc Moreno	39.74	Brazil (BRA); Thiago dos Santos; Thamer Vilar; Fabricio Pereira; Hygor Soares	40.24	Paraguay (PAR); Anhuar Duarte; Kevin Mendieta; Jhumiler Sánchez; Gustavo Mongelos	40.42
4 × 400 m relay	Brazil (BRA); Jadson Lima; Leonardo de Jesus; Caio Silva; Matheus Lima	3:07.14	Ecuador (ECU); Dhustyn Morquecho; Héctor Broncano; Ian Andrey Pata; Alan Minda	3:07.90	Colombia (COL); Juan Wilches; Raúl Palacios; Neider Abello; Daniel Balanta	3:08.59
20,000 m walk	Miguel Peña (COL)	1:25:39.40 PB	Saúl Wamputsrik (ECU)	1:25:41.10	Ezequiel Arrubla (COL)	1:27:39.90 NU20R
High jump	Nicolas Numair (CHI)	2.05 m	Jeiner Mosquera (COL)	2.05 m	Santiago Barberia (ARG)	2.00 m
Pole vault	Ricardo Montes de Oca (VEN)	5.10 m	Andreas Kreiss (BRA)	5.10 m	Cristobal Nuñez (CHI)	5.10 m
Long jump	Gabriel Luiz Boza (BRA)	7.93 m	Breno de Carvalho (BRA)	7.78 m	Kevin Simisterra (ECU)	7.47 m
Triple jump	Felipe da Silva (BRA)	16.25 m	João Pedro de Azevedo (BRA)	15.93 m	Santiago Theran (COL)	15.61 m PB
Shot put	Juan Manuel Arrieguez (ARG)	17.73 m	Ronald Grueso (COL)	17.36 m	Vinícius Avancini (BRA)	17.32 m
Discus throw	Juan David Montaño (COL)	57.00 m PB	Mateus Torres (BRA)	55.83 m	Alberto dos Santos (BRA)	53.20 m
Hammer throw	Tomás Olivera (ARG)	67.22 m	Lautaro Vouilloz (ARG)	65.03 m	Miguel Castro (CHI)	64.03 m
Javelin throw	Lars Flaming (PAR)	74.99 m	Lautaro Techera (URU)	73.33 m	Orlando Fernández (VEN)	72.09 m
Decathlon	Luiz Santos (BRA)	7009 pts	Arnaldo Kowales Júnior (BRA)	6795 pts	Edgar Rosabal (URU)	6144 pts

=== Women ===
Event	Gold		Silver		Bronze	
100 metres (wind: +1.0 m/s)	Laura Martínez (COL)	11.45	Marlet Ospino (COL)	11.54	Daniele Campigotto (BRA)	11.71
200 metres (wind: -0.8 m/s)	Marlet Ospino (COL)	23.25	Laura Martínez (COL)	23.70	Daniele Campigotto (BRA)	24.00
400 metres	Erica Cavalheiro (BRA)	52.95	Nahomy Castro (COL)	53.30	Evelin Mercado (ECU)	53.56
800 metres	Luise Braga (BRA)	2:07.29	Anita Poma (PER)	2:08.37	Sabrina Pena (BRA)	2:08.94
1500 metres	Anita Poma (PER)	4:27.46	Karol Luna (COL)	4:27.58	Mirelle da Silva (BRA)	4:34.58
5000 metres	Benita Parra (BOL)	16:30.61 CR	Nubia Silva (BRA)	16:45.17	Veronica Huacasi (PER)	16:46.10
10,000 metres	Nubia Silva (BRA)	35:37.51	Benita Parra (BOL)	35:39.10	Jeidy Mora (COL)	37:36.66
100 metres hurdles (wind: +0.1 m/s)	Luciana Zapata (COL)	13.40	Lays Silva (BRA)	13.59	Helen Bernard (ARG)	13.64
400 metres hurdles	Helen Bernard (ARG)	60.02	Camille de Oliveira (BRA)	60.08	Camilly dos Santos (BRA)	62.15
3000 metres steeplechase	Mirelle da Silva (BRA)	10:33.61	Veronica Huacasi (PER)	10:34.15	Leydi Raura (ECU)	10:37.58
4 × 100 m relay	Brazil (BRA); Maria Luiza Silva; Vanessa dos Santos; Suellen de Sant Ana; Daniele Campigotto	45.60	Only one finishing team			
4 × 400 m relay	Colombia (COL); Isabella Hurtado; Karol Mosquera; Isabella Castillo; Nahomy Castro	3:40.49	Brazil (BRA); Camilly dos Santos; Luise Braga; Sabrina Pena; Erica Cavalheiro	3:46.30	Peru (PER); Paula Daruich; Bianca Conroy; Cayetana Chirinos; Jimena Reyes	4:08.14
20,000 m walk	Natalia Pulido (COL)	1:41:28.60	Gabriela Muniz (BRA)	1:43:54.60	Inés Huallpa (BOL)	1:46:00.30
High jump	María Arboleda (COL)	1.88 m	Maria Eduarda Barbosa (BRA)	1.78 m	Arielly Rodriguez (BRA)	1.75 m
Pole vault	Luna Pabón (COL)	3.90 m	Karen Bedoya (COL)	3.80 m	Only two athletes with a valid mark	
Long jump	Vanessa dos Santos (BRA)	6.22 m	Rayssa Rodrigues (BRA)	6.06 m	Paula Daruich (PER)	6.01 m
Triple jump	Regiclecia da Silva (BRA)	13.73 m	Valery Arce (COL)	13.17 m	Estrella Lobo (COL)	12.76 m
Shot put	Taniele da Silva (BRA)	15.06 m	Esteisy Salas (COL)	14.95 m	Edmara de Jesus (BRA)	14.29 m
Discus throw	Florencia Dupans (ARG)	48.29 m	Samanta Lopes (BRA)	47.96 m	Angelica Caicedo (COL)	47.71 m
Hammer throw	Nereida Santacruz (ECU)	63.75 m	Yenniver Veroes (VEN)	59.32 m	Giuliana Baigorria (ARG)	59.03 m
Javelin throw	Manuela Rotundo (URU)	57.27 m	Valentina Barrios (COL)	53.61 m	Fiorella Veloso (PAR)	49.43 m
Heptathlon	Tainara Mees (BRA)	5404 pts	Ana Paula Argüello (PAR)	5196 pts	Renata Godoy (ARG)	5156 pts

=== Mixed ===
Event	Gold		Silver		Bronze	
4 × 400 m relay	Colombia (COL); Raúl Palacios; Paola Loboa; Daniel Balanta; Nahomy Castro	3:19.88 CR, NU23R	Ecuador (ECU); Dhustyn Morquecho; Xiomara Ibarra; Alan Minda; Evelin Mercado	3:22.08 NR	Brazil (BRA); Jadson Lima; Camille de Oliveira; Caio Silva; Erica Cavalheiro	3:26.88

== Medal table ==
* Host nation (Colombia)

Rank	Nation	Gold	Silver	Bronze	Total
1	Brazil (BRA)	19	19	12	50
2	Colombia (COL)*	14	11	7	32
3	Argentina (ARG)	4	3	4	11
4	Peru (PER)	2	3	3	8
5	Ecuador (ECU)	1	4	4	9
6	Paraguay (PAR)	1	1	3	5
7	Venezuela (VEN)	1	1	2	4
8	Bolivia (BOL)	1	1	1	3
8	Uruguay (URU)	1	1	1	3
10	Chile (CHI)	1	0	6	7
Totals (10 entries)		45	44	43	132

== Participation ==
- Argentina (23)
- Bolivia (7)
- Brazil (60)
- Chile (17)
- Colombia (79)
- Ecuador (17)
- Panama (1)
- Paraguay (10)
- Peru (14)
- Suriname (1)
- Uruguay (8)
- Venezuela (15)
