= Nicole Caicedo =

Ecuadorean athlete (born 2000)

Personal information
- Full name: Nicole Dayci Caicedo Arce
- Nationality: Ecuador
- Born: 2 September 2000 (age 26)

Sport
- Sport: Athletics
- Event: Sprint

Achievements and titles
- Personal bests: 100m: 11.84 (Guayaquil, 2022); 200m: 22.69 (Quito, 2026) NR; 400m: 51.53 (Sāo Paulo, 2023) NR
Medal record
Women's athletics
Representing Ecuador
Pan American Games
Silver medal – second place	2023 Santiago	400 m
Pan American Championships
Silver medal – second place	2026 Medellín	200 m
South American Games
Silver medal – second place	2026 Santa Fe	200 m
Bronze medal – third place	2026 Santa Fe	Mixed 4 x 400 m relay
South American Championships
Gold medal – first place	2023 São Paulo	200 m
Gold medal – first place	2025 Mar del Plata	200 m
Bronze medal – third place	2025 Mar del Plata	400 m
Bronze medal – third place	2023 São Paulo	400 m
Bronze medal – third place	2023 São Paulo	Mixed 4x400m relay
South American U23 Championships
Gold medal – first place	2022 Cascavel	400m
Gold medal – first place	2022 Cascavel	4x100m relay
Silver medal – second place	2022 Cascavel	4x400m relay

Nicole Dayci Caicedo Arce (born 2 September 2000) is an Ecuadorean track and field athlete who competes as a sprinter. She is the Ecuadorean national record holder in the 200 metres and 400 metres.

== Early life ==
From Guayaquil, Caicedo accepted a scholarship to attend the University of Arizona, however, she was not awarded a visa. Instead, she moved to Quito to train under Nelson Gutiérrez and alongside Anahí Suarez.

== Career ==
Caicedo won gold in the 400 metres at the 2022 South American Under-23 Championships in Athletics.

In June 2023, Caicedo lowered the Ecuadorean national record for the 400 metres to 51.80 in Salamanca, Spain. Eight days later, in Castellón, Spain, she lowered it again as she ran 51.71 seconds. Caicedo won the gold medal in the 200 metres at the 2023 South American Championships in Athletics, in São Paulo in July 2023. At the same championships she also won the bronze medal in the 400 metres and set a new national record time in the events. She then also won a bronze medal in the mixed 4 × 400 m relay event, with Anahí Suárez, Alan Minda and Francisco Tejada. Caicedo was selected for the 2023 World Athletics Championships in Budapest. In November 2023, Caicedo won a silver medal in the 400 meters at the Pan American Games held in Santiago, Chile.

Caicedo ran as part of the Ecuadorian 4 × 100 m relay team at the 2024 World Relays Championships in Nassau, Bahamas. She competed at the 2024 Summer Olympics over 200 metres and 400 metres in August 2024.

Caicedo won the gold medal over 200 metres and the bronze medal over 400 metres at the 2025 South American Championships in Athletics in Argentina.

Caicedo set a new Ecuadorian national record in the 200 meters at the Ecuadorean Championships in Quito in April 2026, running 22.69 seconds (+0.5) to surpass the previous best set by Gabriela Suárez in 2022. In June, she won the silver medal in the 200 metres at the 2026 Pan American Championships in Athletics.
