= Berdine Castillo =

Haitian born Chilean athlete

Personal information
- Full name: Berdine Pierre Castillo Lillo
- Nationality: Chile
- Born: 18 March 2000 (age 26) Port-au-Prince, Haiti
- Education: Andrés Bello National University

Sport
- Sport: Track & field
- Event: 800 metres
Medal record
Women's athletics
Representing Chile
Ibero-American Championships in Athletics
Gold medal – first place	2024 Cuiabá	800 m
Bronze medal – third place	2026 Lima	800 m
South American Games
Bronze medal – third place	2022 Asunción	4 × 400 metres relay
South American Championships
Bronze medal – third place	2023 São Paulo	800 m
Bronze medal – third place	2023 São Paulo	4×400 m relay
Bronze medal – third place	2025 Mar del Plata	800 m
Bolivarian Games
Gold medal – first place	2025 Ayacucho-Lima	800 m

Berdine Pierre Castillo Lillo (born 18 March 2000) is a Chilean athlete. She competes internationally at 800 metres. She won a gold meal in the 2023 South American Championships in Athletics.

== Life ==
Castillo was born in Haiti at Port-au-Prince in 2000.

Her life changed in 2006, when she met her adoptive father Mario Castillo. He had come to Haiti the year before as part of a contingent from the Chilean Air Force to help with establishing peace on the island. He met her when she was living in a home. Mario sent photos of her to his wife and they decided to adopt her, after eight months, and take her to Chile. There, she went to a kindergarten, where she learned Spanish, and she found no racism.

Her presence in her new country was formally recognised when Chile's Supreme Court recognised Castillo as a Chilean citizen. It was the first time the court had done this for a Haitian. She says that she remembers only a few phrases of her first language and she has only small memories of her life before Chile. She just about remembers her birth mother, who had visited her when she in the Haitian home.

Castillo tried a number of sports including artistic gymnastics and swimming before she chose running as her choice. In her running she is supported by her father who comes to support her and he has been known to watch videos to give her sporting advice. Berdine went to the Andrés Bello National University where she learned about obstetrics.

In 2021 the South American Under-23 Athletics Championships was in Ecuador and Castillo became the South American champion at 800 meters. In July 2022 she was in Columbia at the Bolivarian Games.

In 2023 she was in San Paulo in Brazil at the 2023 South American Championships in Athletics. She won Chile's fourth Gold medal in the 800 metres beating nine others including Cristina de Almeida and Anita Poma.

In November 2023, she was complaining to the press about being under pressure not to compete. She mentioned Poulette Cardoch not being chosen despite having the third best time. She believed the decision was based on racism and pressure brought by the retired sprinter Ximena Restrepo.

In January 2024 she was at Cochabamba in Bolivia at the 2024 South American Indoor Championships in Athletics.
