= 2018 South American Under-23 Championships in Athletics – Results =

These are the full results of the 2018 South American Under-23 Championships in Athletics which took place between September 29 and 30 at Pista de Atletismo Jefferson Pérez in Cuenca, Ecuador.

== Men's results ==
=== 100 meters ===
Heats – September 29
Wind:
Heat 1: +0.3 m/s, Heat 2: +0.6 m/s

Rank	Heat	Name	Nationality	Time	Notes
1	2	Derick Silva	Brazil	10.20	Q, CR
2	1	Otilio Rosa	Argentina	10.54	Q
3	1	Ignacio Nordetti	Chile	10.56	Q
4	2	Luis Arizala	Colombia	10.69	Q
5	1	David Vivas	Venezuela	10.71	Q
6	1	Pablo Zuliani	Argentina	10.78	q
7	2	Fabrizio Mautino	Peru	10.79	Q
8	1	Steeven Salas	Ecuador	10.92	q
9	2	Anderson Marquinez	Ecuador	11.06	
10	2	Tito Hinojosa	Bolivia	11.09	
	1	Jhonny Rentería	Colombia	DQ	R162.7
	2	Caesar Compton	Guyana	DNF	

Final – September 29
Wind:
+0.3 m/s

Rank	Lane	Name	Nationality	Time	Notes
1st place, gold medalist(s)	4	Derick Silva	Brazil	10.17	CR
2nd place, silver medalist(s)	5	Otilio Rosa	Argentina	10.50	
3rd place, bronze medalist(s)	3	Ignacio Nordetti	Chile	10.60	
4	7	David Vivas	Venezuela	10.68	
5	6	Luis Arizala	Colombia	10.76	
6	8	Pablo Zuliani	Argentina	10.77	
7	2	Steeven Salas	Ecuador	10.84	
8	1	Fabrizio Mautino	Peru	10.87	

=== 200 meters ===
Heats – September 30
Wind:
Heat 1: +1.1 m/s, Heat 2: 0.0 m/s

Rank	Heat	Name	Nationality	Time	Notes
1	2	Derick Silva	Brazil	20.68	Q
2	1	Otilio Rosa	Argentina	21.10	Q
3	2	Enzo Faulbaum	Chile	21.17	Q
4	2	Carlos Perlaza	Ecuador	21.43	Q
5	1	Nilo Dure	Paraguay	21.67	Q
6	2	Valentin Della	Argentina	21.79	q
7	1	David Vivas	Venezuela	21.80	Q
8	2	Luis Iriarte	Peru	21.82	q
9	2	Nicolas Salinas	Peru	21.86	
10	2	Anderson Marquinez	Ecuador	22.32	
11	2	Tito Hinojosa	Bolivia	22.53	
	1	Andrés Steuer	Chile	DNF	
	1	Caesar Compton	Guyana	DNS	

Final – September 30
Wind:
-1.9 m/s

Rank	Lane	Name	Nationality	Time	Notes
1st place, gold medalist(s)	5	Otilio Rosa	Argentina	21.06	
2nd place, silver medalist(s)	6	Carlos Perlaza	Ecuador	21.13	
3rd place, bronze medalist(s)	3	Enzo Faulbaum	Chile	21.20	
4	2	Luis Iriarte	Peru	21.87	
5	7	Valentin Della	Argentina	22.18	
	1	David Vivas	Venezuela	DNS	
	4	Derick Silva	Brazil	DNS	
	8	Nilo Dure	Paraguay	DNS	

=== 400 meters ===
September 29

Rank	Lane	Name	Nationality	Time	Notes
1st place, gold medalist(s)	5	Anthony Zambrano	Colombia	45.19	CR
2nd place, silver medalist(s)	6	Alison dos Santos	Brazil	45.97	
3rd place, bronze medalist(s)	3	Bruno Benedito da Silva	Brazil	46.23	
4	7	Elián Larregina	Argentina	46.54	
5	4	Kelvis Padrino	Venezuela	46.96	
6	8	David Cetre	Ecuador	47.13	
7	2	Carlos Perlaza	Ecuador	47.64	

=== 800 meters ===
September 30

Rank	Name	Nationality	Time	Notes
1st place, gold medalist(s)	Matheus Pessoa	Brazil	1:49.67	
2nd place, silver medalist(s)	Marco Vilca	Peru	1:50.52	
3rd place, bronze medalist(s)	Rafael Muñoz	Chile	1:51.10	
4	Jean Jácome	Ecuador	1:53.30	
5	Josué Fernández	Colombia	1:53.39	
6	Carlos Arellano	Ecuador	1:54.14	
7	Julián Gaviola	Argentina	1:55.24	
8	José Antonio Maita	Venezuela	1:55.72	
9	Diego Lacamoire	Argentina	1:56.54	

=== 1500 meters ===
September 29

Rank	Name	Nationality	Time	Notes
1st place, gold medalist(s)	Carlos Hernández	Colombia	3:59.47	
2nd place, silver medalist(s)	Cleber Cisneros	Peru	4:00.66	
3rd place, bronze medalist(s)	Diego Uribe	Chile	4:01.21	
4	Santiago Catrofe	Uruguay	4:01.64	
5	Carlos Arellano	Ecuador	4:03.59	
6	Ryan López	Venezuela	4:03.62	
7	Yessy Apaz	Bolivia	4:06.09	
8	Diego Lacamoire	Argentina	4:07.30	
9	Yonathan Ichiparra	Peru	4:07.86	
10	Jean Jácome	Ecuador	4:07.93	
11	José Zabala	Argentina	4:15.78	

=== 5000 meters ===
September 30

Rank	Name	Nationality	Time	Notes
1st place, gold medalist(s)	Yuri Labra	Peru	14:57.61	
2nd place, silver medalist(s)	Vidal Basco	Bolivia	14:59.49	
3rd place, bronze medalist(s)	Paul Ramírez	Peru	14:59.85	
4	Cristian Moreno	Colombia	15:22.08	
5	Juan Carlos Huiza	Bolivia	15:26.39	
6	Diego Uribe	Chile	15:28.87	
7	Brayan Revelo	Ecuador	15:40.14	
8	Erick Alcivar	Ecuador	15:56.72	
	José Zabala	Argentina	DNF	

=== 10,000 meters ===
September 29

Rank	Name	Nationality	Time	Notes
1st place, gold medalist(s)	Vidal Basco	Bolivia	31:14.72	
2nd place, silver medalist(s)	Yuri Labra	Peru	31:56.16	
3rd place, bronze medalist(s)	Juan Carlos Huiza	Bolivia	31:59.52	
4	Paul Ramírez	Peru	32:50.63	
5	Erick Alcivar	Ecuador	34:42.32	
6	Cristian Conteron	Ecuador	35:00.71	

=== 110 meters hurdles ===
September 29
Wind: +1.2 m/s

Rank	Lane	Name	Nationality	Time	Notes
1st place, gold medalist(s)	5	Rafael Pereira	Brazil	13.76	
2nd place, silver medalist(s)	4	Fanor Escobar	Colombia	14.02	
3rd place, bronze medalist(s)	3	Juan Pablo Germain	Chile	14.12	
4	7	Marcos Herrera	Ecuador	14.17	
5	6	Mauricio Garrido	Peru	14.36	
6	2	Eric Espinoza	Ecuador	15.53	

=== 400 meters hurdles ===
September 30

Rank	Lane	Name	Nationality	Time	Notes
1st place, gold medalist(s)	4	Alison dos Santos	Brazil	50.56	
2nd place, silver medalist(s)	5	Mikael Antonio de Jesus	Brazil	51.13	
3rd place, bronze medalist(s)	7	Ian Corozo	Ecuador	51.92	
4	8	Kevin Mina	Colombia	52.34	
5	6	Damian Moretta	Argentina	52.86	
6	2	Francisco Guerrero	Ecuador	53.34	
	3	Fanor Escobar	Colombia	DNF	

=== 3000 meters steeplechase ===
September 30

Rank	Name	Nationality	Time	Notes
1st place, gold medalist(s)	Diego Arevalo	Ecuador	9:24.61	
2nd place, silver medalist(s)	Yessy Apaz	Bolivia	9:27.50	
3rd place, bronze medalist(s)	Yonathan Ichiparra	Peru	9:35.66	
	Gerson Montes	Ecuador	DNS	

=== 4 × 100 meters relay ===
September 29

Rank	Lane	Nation	Competitors	Time	Notes
1st place, gold medalist(s)	2	Colombia	Fanor Escobar, Anthony Zambrano, Luis Arizala, Jhonny Rentería	40.08	
2nd place, silver medalist(s)	3	Chile	Ignacio Nordetti, Enzo Faulbaum, Andrés Steuer, Juan Pablo Germain	40.60	
3rd place, bronze medalist(s)	4	Ecuador	Steven Charcopa, Carlos Perlaza, Anderson Marquinez, Steeven Salas	41.09	
4	5	Argentina	Damian Moretta, Pablo Zuliani, Valentin Della, Otilio Rosa	41.19	
5	6	Peru	Marco Vilca, Luis Iriarte, Mauricio Garrido, Fabrizio Mautino	42.52	

=== 4 × 400 meters relay ===
September 30

Rank	Nation	Competitors	Time	Notes
1st place, gold medalist(s)	Colombia	Luis Arizala, Nicolás Salinas, Kevin Mina, Anthony Zambrano	3:09.77	
2nd place, silver medalist(s)	Brazil	Rafael Pereira, Matheus Pessoa, Alison dos Santos, Bruno Benedito da Silva	3:09.90	
3rd place, bronze medalist(s)	Ecuador	Damian Carcelen, Kenny León, Carlos Perlaza, David Cetre	3:13.17	
4	Argentina	Damian Moretta, Julian Gaviola, Otilio Rosa, Elian Larregina	3:18.23	
5	Chile	Juan Pablo Germain, Rafael Muñoz, Enzo Faulbaum, Ignacio Nordetti	3:20.89	

=== 20,000 meters walk ===
September 29

Rank	Name	Nationality	Time	Notes
1st place, gold medalist(s)	César Rodríguez	Peru	1:24:51.85	
2nd place, silver medalist(s)	Jhonatan Amores	Ecuador	1:25:12.25	
3rd place, bronze medalist(s)	Paolo Yurivilca	Peru	1:25:44.23	
4	Xavier Mena	Ecuador	1:27:42.08	

=== High jump ===
September 29

Rank	Name	Nationality	1.80	1.85	1.90	1.95	2.00	2.05	2.10	2.15	Result	Notes
1st place, gold medalist(s)	Jorge Luis da Graça	Brazil	o	–	o	o	o	o	o	xxx	2.10	
2nd place, silver medalist(s)	Andy Preciado	Ecuador	–	–	–	o	xo	o	xxx		2.05	
3rd place, bronze medalist(s)	Claudio da Silva	Brazil	o	–	xo	o	o	xxo	xxx		2.05	
4	Jessie Corozo	Ecuador	–	o	o	o	xxx				1.95	
5	Francisco Moraga	Chile	–	o	xo	xo	xxx				1.95	
6	Sebastián Martin	Chile	o	xo	xxx						1.85	
7	Diego Schmith	Paraguay	xxo	xxx							1.80	

=== Pole vault ===
September 30

Rank	Name	Nationality	4.00	4.15	4.45	4.60	4.70	4.80	4.90	5.00	5.10	5.20	5.30	Result	Notes
1st place, gold medalist(s)	Bruno Spinelli	Brazil	–	–	–	–	–	–	–	o	–	o	xxx	5.20	
2nd place, silver medalist(s)	Pablo Chaverra	Colombia	–	–	–	–	–	xo	x–	o	xo	o	xxx	5.20	
3rd place, bronze medalist(s)	Dyander Pacho	Ecuador	–	–	–	xo	–	o	xo	o	xo	xxx		5.10	
4	José Pacho	Ecuador	–	–	–	–	–	–	–	xo	–	xxx		5.00	
5	José Gutiérrez	Peru	–	–	–	–	–	o	xxo	xxx				4.90	
6	Eduardo Martin	Chile	o	xxo	xo	xo	xo	xxx						4.70	
7	Sebastián Martin	Chile	–	–	o	o	–	xxx						4.60	
	Martin Castañares	Uruguay	–	–	–	xxx								NM	

=== Long jump ===
September 29

Rank	Name	Nationality	#1	#2	#3	#4	#5	#6	Result	Notes
1st place, gold medalist(s)	Samory Fraga	Brazil	7.42	6.17	x	7.27	7.42	7.42	7.42	
2nd place, silver medalist(s)	Fabrizio Mautino	Peru	x	7.26	x	4.70	x	x	7.26	
3rd place, bronze medalist(s)	Brian López	Argentina	7.25w	7.17	x	7.13	7.04	7.17	7.25w	
4	Matías González	Chile	6.93	7.13	7.12	6.69	6.77w	6.93	7.13	
	Kevin Canchingre	Ecuador							DNS	
	Bryan Castro	Ecuador							DNS	

=== Triple jump ===
September 30

Rank	Name	Nationality	#1	#2	#3	#4	#5	#6	Result	Notes
1st place, gold medalist(s)	Ulisses Costa	Brazil	x	15.87	x	x	15.58	x	15.87	
2nd place, silver medalist(s)	Geiner Moreno	Colombia	14.26	15.60	x	x	15.55	15.76	15.76	
3rd place, bronze medalist(s)	Frixon Chila	Ecuador	15.53	x	15.69	x	x	15.08	15.69	
4	José Álvarez	Argentina	x	x	13.78	15.05	15.13	15.34	15.34	
	Samory Fraga	Brazil							DNS	

=== Shot put ===
September 29

Rank	Name	Nationality	#1	#2	#3	#4	#5	#6	Result	Notes
1st place, gold medalist(s)	Welington Morais	Brazil	19.76	19.85	19.85	x	–	18.87	19.85	
2nd place, silver medalist(s)	José Miguel Ballivian	Chile	x	17.46	16.65	x	x	16.61	17.46	
3rd place, bronze medalist(s)	Saymon Hoffmann	Brazil	16.01	15.47	16.59	16.23	x	x	16.59	
4	Eduardo Espín	Ecuador	15.76	16.48	x	16.29	x	16.05	16.48	
5	Sebatián Lazen	Chile	15.41	16.30	16.35	x	16.00	16.31	16.35	
6	Peter Ortiz	Ecuador	x	13.39	14.10	14.67	14.00	x	14.67	

=== Discus throw ===
September 30

Rank	Name	Nationality	#1	#2	#3	#4	#5	#6	Result	Notes
1st place, gold medalist(s)	Cleverson Oliveira	Brazil	49.12	x	52.80	x	x	52.46	52.80	
2nd place, silver medalist(s)	Wellinton da Cruz	Brazil	x	x	52.29	x	x	x	52.29	
3rd place, bronze medalist(s)	José Miguel Ballivián	Chile	51.26	x	50.23	52.11	x	x	52.11	
4	Claudio Romero	Chile	x	x	50.65	x	x	49.41	50.65	
5	Eduardo Espín	Ecuador	43.04	44.65	40.43	43.67	40.21	x	44.65	
6	Gerson Ramírez	Colombia	x	x	x	42.81	x	x	42.81	
	Andy Preciado	Ecuador							DNS	

=== Hammer throw ===
September 29

Rank	Name	Nationality	#1	#2	#3	#4	#5	#6	Result	Notes
1st place, gold medalist(s)	Humberto Mansilla	Chile	73.38	74.38	76.87	x	74.85	72.72	76.87	CR, NR
2nd place, silver medalist(s)	Joaquín Gómez	Argentina	67.96	70.91	x	72.07	74.38	75.96	75.96	
3rd place, bronze medalist(s)	Gabriel Kehr	Chile	70.87	73.33	73.42	74.31	71.54	73.15	74.31	
4	Xavier Colmenarez	Venezuela	55.27	57.82	58.41	x	56.96	x	58.41	
5	Cristián Suárez	Ecuador	56.03	55.18	58.30	54.86	55.96	x	58.30	
6	Estalyn Rodríguez	Ecuador	54.93	x	57.69	57.99	54.78	x	57.99	

=== Javelin throw ===
September 30

Rank	Name	Nationality	#1	#2	#3	#4	#5	#6	Result	Notes
1st place, gold medalist(s)	Francisco Muse	Chile	75.37	74.39	72.43	76.91	x	73.32	76.91	
2nd place, silver medalist(s)	Pedro Luiz Barros	Brazil	73.68	65.82	x	70.67	76.32	75.92	76.32	
3rd place, bronze medalist(s)	Pedro Henrique Rodrigues	Brazil	x	71.57	x	x	68.41	x	71.57	
4	Billy Julio	Venezuela	66.53	61.99	x	67.15	64.57	63.51	67.15	
5	Jorge Luis Velasquez	Colombia	x	58.68	58.12	64.72	x	x	64.72	
6	William Torres	Ecuador	62.90	63.29	60.28	60.82	63.60	57.51	63.60	
	Carlos Tuares	Ecuador							DNS	

=== Decathlon ===
September 29–30

The highest mark recorded in each event is highlighted in yellow

Rank	Athlete	Nationality	100m	LJ	SP	HJ	400m	110m H	DT	PV	JT	1500m	Points	Notes
1st place, gold medalist(s)	Sergio Pandiani	Argentina	10.99	6.71	13.28	1.89	50.49	14.90	34.90	4.00	64.22	5:13.22	7119	
2nd place, silver medalist(s)	César Jofre	Chile	11.12	7.05w	15.24	1.89	51.99	16.03	45.44	4.00	49.74	5:58.11	6873	
3rd place, bronze medalist(s)	Luiz Henrique Santos	Brazil	11.07	6.84	11.73	1.98	48.94	15.31	37.10	3.50	43.53	5:07.27	6772	
4	Anderson Gordillo	Ecuador	11.70	6.33	10.15	1.77	52.35	16.88	34.56	4.00	48.02	4:59.89	6104	

== Women's results ==
=== 100 meters ===
Heats – September 29
Wind:
Heat 1: +0.6 m/s, Heat 2: -0.2 m/s

Rank	Heat	Name	Nationality	Time	Notes
1	1	Ángela Tenorio	Ecuador	11.21	Q
2	2	Vitória Cristina Rosa	Brazil	11.35	Q
3	2	Anahí Suárez	Ecuador	11.67	Q
4	1	Evelyn Rivera	Colombia	11.86	Q
5	1	Javiera Cañas	Chile	12.08	Q
6	1	Gabriela Delgado	Peru	12.13	q
6	2	Kenisha Phillips	Guyana	12.13	Q
8	1	Shelsy Romero	Colombia	12.14	q
9	1	Guillermina Cossio	Argentina	12.18	
10	2	Edmari Acevedo	Venezuela	12.19	
11	2	María Ignacia Montt	Chile	12.24	
12	2	Xenia Hiebert	Paraguay	12.26	
13	2	Alinny Delgadillo	Bolivia	12.29	
14	2	Silvana Cáceres	Paraguay	12.45	
15	1	Ruth Sanmoogan	Guyana	12.51	

Final – September 29
Wind:
+1.0 m/s

Rank	Lane	Name	Nationality	Time	Notes
1st place, gold medalist(s)	4	Ángela Tenorio	Ecuador	11.09	CR
2nd place, silver medalist(s)	5	Vitória Cristina Rosa	Brazil	11.17	
3rd place, bronze medalist(s)	3	Anahí Suárez	Ecuador	11.50	
4	6	Evelyn Rivera	Colombia	11.78	
5	7	Kenisha Phillips	Guyana	11.91	
6	1	Gabriela Delgado	Peru	11.96	
7	2	Shelsy Romero	Colombia	11.99	
8	8	Javiera Cañas	Chile	12.02	

=== 200 meters ===
Heats – September 30
Wind:
Heat 1: +0.5 m/s, Heat 2: +1.6 m/s

Rank	Heat	Name	Nationality	Time	Notes
1	2	Vitória Cristina Rosa	Brazil	23.12	Q, CR
2	2	Virginia Villalba	Ecuador	23.97	Q
3	1	Anahí Suárez	Ecuador	24.25	Q
4	1	Evelyn Rivera	Colombia	24.27	Q
5	1	Martina Weil	Chile	24.27	Q
6	2	Kenisha Phillips	Guyana	24.35	Q
7	1	Guillermina Cossio	Argentina	24.53	q
8	2	Gabriela Delgado	Peru	24.74	q
9	1	Alinny Delgadillo	Bolivia	25.06	
10	1	Xenia Hiebert	Paraguay	25.42	
11	1	Giara Garate	Peru	25.44	
12	2	Briza Dure	Paraguay	25.65	
	2	Javiera Cañas	Chile	DNS	
	2	Shelsy Romero	Colombia	DNS	

Final – September 30
Wind:
-0.1 m/s

Rank	Lane	Name	Nationality	Time	Notes
1st place, gold medalist(s)	4	Vitória Cristina Rosa	Brazil	23.04	CR
2nd place, silver medalist(s)	3	Anahí Suárez	Ecuador	23.44	
3rd place, bronze medalist(s)	6	Evelyn Rivera	Colombia	23.69	
4	7	Martina Weil	Chile	23.78	
5	5	Virginia Villalba	Ecuador	23.87	
6	8	Kenisha Phillips	Guyana	24.69	
7	1	Guillermina Cossio	Argentina	24.83	
	2	Gabriela Delgado	Peru	DNS	

=== 400 meters ===
September 29

Rank	Name	Nationality	Time	Notes
1st place, gold medalist(s)	Martina Weil	Chile	52.60	
2nd place, silver medalist(s)	Tiffani Marinho	Brazil	52.95	
3rd place, bronze medalist(s)	Eliana Chávez	Colombia	53.11	
4	Noelia Martínez	Argentina	54.22	
5	Damaris Palomeque	Colombia	55.47	
6	Virginia Villalba	Ecuador	56.17	
7	Pamela Milano	Venezuela	56.85	
8	Coraima Cortez	Ecuador	58.39	
9	Esperanza Manrique	Peru	1:00.12	

=== 800 meters ===
September 30

Rank	Name	Nationality	Time	Notes
1st place, gold medalist(s)	Johana Arrieta	Colombia	2:09.65	
2nd place, silver medalist(s)	Martina Escudero	Argentina	2:13.42	
3rd place, bronze medalist(s)	Carolina Lozano	Argentina	2:15.38	
4	Berdine Castillo	Chile	2:17.07	
5	Irene Navarrete	Ecuador	2:18.84	
6	Valeria Cali	Ecuador	2:23.93	
	Pamela Milano	Venezuela	DNS	

=== 1500 meters ===
September 29

Rank	Name	Nationality	Time	Notes
1st place, gold medalist(s)	Micaela Levaggi	Argentina	4:31.60	
2nd place, silver medalist(s)	Katherine Tisalema	Ecuador	4:31.88	
3rd place, bronze medalist(s)	Saida Meneses	Peru	4:33.53	
4	Carolina Lozano	Argentina	4:48.58	
5	Irene Navarrete	Ecuador	4:59.42	

=== 5000 meters ===
September 30

Rank	Name	Nationality	Time	Notes
1st place, gold medalist(s)	Saida Meneses	Peru	17:20.54	
2nd place, silver medalist(s)	Sheyla Eulogio	Peru	17:58.99	
3rd place, bronze medalist(s)	Lizbeth Vicuna	Ecuador	18:10.46	
4	Deysi Cabrera	Bolivia	18:10.85	
5	María Fernanda Montoya	Colombia	18:15.64	
6	Damaris Díaz	Ecuador	18:17.03	
7	Ana María Cifuentes	Colombia	18:53.53	
	Micaela Levaggi	Argentina	DNF	

=== 10,000 meters ===
September 29

Rank	Name	Nationality	Time	Notes
1st place, gold medalist(s)	Thalia Valdivia	Peru	36:58.03	
2nd place, silver medalist(s)	Sheyla Eulogio	Peru	38:18.86	
3rd place, bronze medalist(s)	María Fernanda Montoya	Colombia	38:25.89	
4	Erika Pilicita	Ecuador	39:15.99	
5	Damaris Díaz	Ecuador	40:12.23	

=== 100 meters hurdles ===
September 29
Wind: -1.4 m/s

Rank	Lane	Name	Nationality	Time	Notes
1st place, gold medalist(s)	5	Micaela de Mello	Brazil	13.31	CR
2nd place, silver medalist(s)	4	Maribel Caicedo	Ecuador	13.54	
3rd place, bronze medalist(s)	2	Triana Alonso	Peru	14.09	
4	6	Génesis Cabezas	Ecuador	14.26	
5	3	Yoveinny Mota	Venezuela	17.68	

=== 400 meters hurdles ===
September 30

Rank	Lane	Name	Nationality	Time	Notes
1st place, gold medalist(s)	4	Fiorella Chiappe	Argentina	56.25	CR
2nd place, silver medalist(s)	3	Chayenne da Silva	Brazil	59.21	
3rd place, bronze medalist(s)	6	Marlene dos Santos	Brazil	59.52	
4	5	Marina Poroso	Ecuador	59.86	
5	7	Andreina Minda	Ecuador	1:06.09	

=== 3000 meters steeplechase ===
September 30

Rank	Name	Nationality	Time	Notes
1st place, gold medalist(s)	Katherine Tisalema	Ecuador	10:45.80	
2nd place, silver medalist(s)	Rina Cjuro	Peru	10:47.25	
3rd place, bronze medalist(s)	Erika Pilicita	Ecuador	11:18.41	
4	Clara Baiocchi	Argentina	11:40.38	
5	Elizabeth Ortiz	Peru	12:01.50	

=== 4 × 100 meters relay ===
September 29

Rank	Lane	Nation	Competitors	Time	Notes
1st place, gold medalist(s)	3	Ecuador	Katherine Chillambo, Ángela Tenorio, Marina Poroso, Anahí Suárez	44.18	CR
2nd place, silver medalist(s)	6	Chile	Poulette Cardoch, Martina Weil, María Ignacia Montt, Javiera Cañas	45.55	
3rd place, bronze medalist(s)	4	Colombia	Shelsy Romero, Damaris Palomeque, Eliana Chávez, Evelyn Rivera	45.57	
4	4	Peru	Giara Garate, Triana Alonso, Brenda Galeano, Gabriela Delgado	46.34	
5	5	Paraguay	Briza Dure, Silvana Cáceres, Ruth Báez, Xenia Hiebert	47.43	

=== 4 × 400 meters relay ===
September 30

Rank	Nation	Competitors	Time	Notes
1st place, gold medalist(s)	Colombia	Lina Licona, Johana Arrieta, Damaris Palomeque, Eliana Chávez	3:35.50	CR
2nd place, silver medalist(s)	Brazil	Marlene dos Santos, Micaela de Mello, Chayenne da Silva, Tiffani Marinho	3:42.38	
3rd place, bronze medalist(s)	Ecuador	Andreina Minda, Coraima Cortez, Marina Poroso, Virginia Villalba	3:43.91	
4	Chile	Poulette Cardoch, Berdine Castillo, Martina Weil, María Ignacia Montt	3:44.82	
5	Argentina	Guillermina Cossio, Noelia Martínez, Martina Escudero, Fiorella Chiappe	3:45.67	

=== 20,000 meters walk ===
September 29

Rank	Name	Nationality	Time	Notes
1st place, gold medalist(s)	Leyde Guerra	Peru	1:32:12.42	CR
2nd place, silver medalist(s)	Karla Jaramillo	Ecuador	1:35:43.03	
3rd place, bronze medalist(s)	Mishell Semblantes	Ecuador	1:43:33.89	
4	Anastasia Sanzana	Chile	1:51:36.01	

=== High jump ===
September 30

Rank	Name	Nationality	1.60	1.65	1.70	1.73	1.76	1.80	1.92	Result	Notes
1st place, gold medalist(s)	María Fernanda Murillo	Colombia	–	–	–	–	o	o	xxx	1.80	
2nd place, silver medalist(s)	Victoria Rozas	Chile	xo	xxo	xxo	xxo	xxx			1.73	
3rd place, bronze medalist(s)	Kenia Briones	Ecuador	xo	xxo	o	xxx				1.70	

=== Pole vault ===
September 29

Rank	Name	Nationality	3.30	3.45	3.60	3.70	3.80	3.90	4.00	4.10	4.20	4.25	4.30	4.40	4.50	Result	Notes
1st place, gold medalist(s)	Juliana Campos	Brazil	–	–	–	–	–	–	o	o	o	–	xo	xxo	xxx	4.40	CR
2nd place, silver medalist(s)	Katherine Castillo	Colombia	–	–	–	–	o	–	o	o	o	xxx				4.20	
3rd place, bronze medalist(s)	Nicole Hein	Peru	–	–	–	xo	o	xo	o	xxx						4.00	
4	Isabel de Quadros	Brazil	–	–	–	–	o	o	xo	xxx						4.00	
5	Fernanda Carabias	Chile	o	o	o	xxx										3.60	
	Ana Gabriela Quiñónez	Ecuador														DNS	

=== Long jump ===
September 30

Rank	Name	Nationality	#1	#2	#3	#4	#5	#6	Result	Notes
1st place, gold medalist(s)	Aries Sánchez	Venezuela	6.15	6.42	–	x	6.39	x	6.42	CR
2nd place, silver medalist(s)	Mirieli Santos	Brazil	5.65	5.73	5.87w	5.63	5.98w	6.04	6.04	
3rd place, bronze medalist(s)	Leticia Oro Melo	Brazil	5.94	x	x	x	x	5.87	5.94	
4	Valeria Quispe	Bolivia	x	x	5.57	x	x	5.85	5.85	
5	Ruth Sanmoogan	Guyana	5.31	5.49	5.59	5.43	5.74w	5.63	5.74w	
6	Brenda Galeano	Peru	x	x	5.55w	5.36	x	5.74w	5.74w	
7	Yaikier Cortez	Ecuador	5.20	5.36	5.22w	5.17	4.97	5.33	5.36	
8	Adriana Chila	Ecuador	4.01	5.24	5.21	5.36	5.30	5.24	5.36	
9	Ruth Báez	Paraguay	x	4.58w	5.07w				5.07w	
	Javiera Cañas	Chile							DNS	

=== Triple jump ===
September 29

Rank	Name	Nationality	#1	#2	#3	#4	#5	#6	Result	Notes
1st place, gold medalist(s)	Mirieli Santos	Brazil	13.34	x	x	x	13.26	11.61	13.34	
2nd place, silver medalist(s)	Adriana Chila	Ecuador	12.58	12.64	12.82	12.73	13.06w	12.95	13.06w	
3rd place, bronze medalist(s)	Valeria Quispe	Bolivia	12.29	x	12.59	x	x	12.79	12.79	
4	Kiara Lastra	Ecuador	11.16	11.77	12.09	11.94	11.64	12.22	12.22	

=== Shot put ===
September 30

Rank	Name	Nationality	#1	#2	#3	#4	#5	#6	Result	Notes
1st place, gold medalist(s)	Amanda Scherer	Brazil	x	14.74	15.30	15.36	15.68	15.13	15.68	
2nd place, silver medalist(s)	Ailén Armada	Argentina	14.23	15.21	x	15.45	x	15.58	15.58	
3rd place, bronze medalist(s)	Yerlin Mesa	Colombia	14.58	14.67	14.84	14.68	14.72	14.96	14.96	
4	Ana Caroline da Silva	Brazil	13.65	13.78	x	x	13.31	14.26	14.26	
5	Jessica Molina	Ecuador	10.91	12.43	12.57	12.14	12.67	12.33	12.67	
6	Iara Capurro	Argentina	x	11.69	12.12	x	11.80	11.88	12.12	
7	Catalina Bravo	Chile	9.08	9.59	10.04	10.49	9.90	9.97	10.49	
	Ginger Quintero	Ecuador							DNS	

=== Discus throw ===
September 29

Rank	Name	Nationality	#1	#2	#3	#4	#5	#6	Result	Notes
1st place, gold medalist(s)	Ailén Armada	Argentina	x	51.77	54.40	x	x	51.64	54.40	
2nd place, silver medalist(s)	Valquiria Meurer	Brazil	x	46.86	47.51	52.04	50.44	44.15	52.04	
3rd place, bronze medalist(s)	Yerlin Mesa	Colombia	x	48.07	48.20	45.98	48.50	x	48.50	
4	Iara Capurro	Argentina	47.33	47.98	x	46.00	45.92	43.92	47.98	
5	Catalina Bravo	Chile	44.10	x	45.38	46.88	46.91	46.85	46.91	
6	Merari Herrera	Ecuador	43.40	40.95	40.04	40.20	41.02	x	43.40	
7	Marjorie Moya	Ecuador	37.21	38.71	37.71	36.62	36.65	36.63	38.71	

=== Hammer throw ===
September 30

Rank	Name	Nationality	#1	#2	#3	#4	#5	#6	Result	Notes
1st place, gold medalist(s)	Mayra Gaviria	Colombia	59.80	62.10	x	55.89	58.85	55.51	62.10	
2nd place, silver medalist(s)	Ximena Zorrilla	Peru	x	60.26	59.80	x	61.84	x	61.84	
3rd place, bronze medalist(s)	Mariana García	Chile	x	61.59	61.52	60.52	x	57.71	61.59	
4	Ana Lays Bayer	Brazil	x	x	x	60.01	59.03	60.21	60.21	
5	Jessica Molina	Ecuador	48.14	49.14	50.22	52.03	x	46.29	52.03	
6	Carolina Calahorrano	Ecuador	44.89	45.81	x	43.78	x	45.36	45.81	

=== Javelin throw ===
September 29

Rank	Name	Nationality	#1	#2	#3	#4	#5	#6	Result	Notes
1st place, gold medalist(s)	Laura Paredes	Paraguay	53.15	50.36	54.99	–	55.59	52.46	55.59	
2nd place, silver medalist(s)	Juleisy Angulo	Ecuador	x	50.47	51.08	54.95	x	x	54.95	
3rd place, bronze medalist(s)	Merly Palacios	Colombia	51.79	45.88	52.98	x	x	x	52.98	
4	Linda Gonzales	Ecuador	43.12	44.69	x	44.87	42.86	44.01	44.87	

=== Heptathlon ===
September 29–30

The highest mark recorded in each event is highlighted in yellow

Rank	Athlete	Nationality	100m H	HJ	SP	200m	LJ	JT	800m	Points	Notes
1st place, gold medalist(s)	Martha Araújo	Colombia	13.84	1.69	12.21	24.94	6.15	46.19	2:27.36	5818	
2nd place, silver medalist(s)	Jenifer Nicole Norberto	Brazil	14.44	1.72	12.02	26.38	5.71	36.91	2:29.62	5290	
3rd place, bronze medalist(s)	Keiverlyn González	Venezuela	14.79	1.60	9.17	25.05	5.48	31.27	2:25.78	4905	
4	Francisca Valencia	Chile	14.95	1.57	10.08	25.20	5.48	30.15	2:27.89	4846	
5	Rocío Chaparro	Paraguay	14.99	1.45	11.19	27.13	5.04	40.27	2:43.71	4491	
6	Alexia Ramírez	Peru	15.28	1.48	10.32	26.77	5.42	34.85	2:45.43	4443	
