= 2026 South American Indoor Championships in Athletics – Results =

These are the full results of the 2026 South American Indoor Championships in Athletics which took place in Cochabamba, Bolivia, on 28 February and 1 March at the Estadio de Atletismo del Gobierno Autónomo Municipal de Cochabamba.

== Men's results ==
=== 60 metres ===
Heats – 28 February

Rank	Heat	Name	Nationality	Time	Notes
1	1	Bryant Alamo	Venezuela	6.61	Q
1	2	Erik Cardoso	Brazil	6.61	Q
3	1	Gabriel dos Santos	Brazil	6.65	Q
4	1	Neiker Abello	Colombia	6.69	Q
5	2	Eubrig Maza	Venezuela	6.70	Q
6	2	Tomás Villegas	Argentina	6.74	Q
7	2	Alexandre Nascimento	Brazil	6.77	
8	1	Franco Florio	Argentina	6.80	q
9	1	Julián Vargas	Bolivia	6.81	q
10	2	Cristian Ortega	Colombia	6.83	
11	2	Arturo Deliser	Panama	6.86	
12	2	Matías Maturana	Bolivia	6.93	
13	1	Jaime Smith	Panama	7.01	
	1	Eloy Benitez	Puerto Rico	DQ	

Final – 28 February

Rank	Lane	Name	Nationality	Time	Notes
1st place, gold medalist(s)	3	Gabriel dos Santos	Brazil	6.56	CR
2nd place, silver medalist(s)	4	Bryant Alamo	Venezuela	6.59	
3rd place, bronze medalist(s)	5	Erik Cardoso	Brazil	6.62	
4	2	Neiker Abello	Colombia	6.68	
5	7	Tomás Villegas	Argentina	6.69	
6	6	Eubrig Maza	Venezuela	6.69	
7	1	Franco Florio	Argentina	6.77	
8	8	Julián Vargas	Bolivia	6.79	

=== 400 metres ===
Heats – 28 February

Rank	Heat	Name	Nationality	Time	Notes
1	2	Matheus Lima	Brazil	45.82	Q, CR
1	3	Tiago Lemes	Brazil	47.31	Q
2	3	Jeffrey Cajo	Peru	47.86	q
3	1	Elián Larregina	Argentina	48.88	Q
4	1	Manuel Henao	Colombia	49.08	
5	3	Ikenna Ibe-Akobi	Bolivia	49.52	
6	2	Manuel Juárez	Argentina	50.55	
7	1	Nery Peñaloza	Bolivia	50.60	
	2	Francisco Tejeda	Ecuador	DNS	

Final – 1 March

Rank	Lane	Name	Nationality	Time	Notes
1st place, gold medalist(s)	6	Matheus Lima	Brazil	45.85	
2nd place, silver medalist(s)	5	Tiago Lemes	Brazil	47.02	
3rd place, bronze medalist(s)	4	Elián Larregina	Argentina	47.46	
4	3	Jeffrey Cajo	Peru	47.58	

=== 800 metres ===
1 March

Rank	Heat	Name	Nationality	Time	Notes
1st place, gold medalist(s)	2	Eduardo Moreira	Brazil	1:47.58	CR
2nd place, silver medalist(s)	2	Guilherme Orenhas	Brazil	1:47.94	
3rd place, bronze medalist(s)	2	Marco Vilca	Peru	1:49.95	
4	1	Jairo Moreira	Uruguay	1:52.49	NR
5	1	Leandro Daza	Bolivia	1:54.25	
6	2	Adrián Mendoza	Colombia	1:54.60	
7	2	Matías González	Uruguay	1:55.63	
8	1	Omar Sotomayor	Bolivia	1:55.66	
	1	David Preciado	Colombia	DNF	

=== 1500 metres ===
28 February

Rank	Name	Nationality	Time	Notes
1st place, gold medalist(s)	Yeferson Cuno	Peru	3:50.75	
2nd place, silver medalist(s)	David Ninavia	Bolivia	3:51.20	NR
3rd place, bronze medalist(s)	Dylan Carrasco	Colombia	3:54.06	NR
4	Adrian König-Rannenberg	Peru	3:59.82	
5	Gonzalo Gervasini	Uruguay	4:00.51	
6	Antonio Gnecco	Colombia	4:10.97	
7	David Preciado	Colombia	4:23.77	
	Wilmer Santos	Bolivia	DNF	

=== 3000 metres ===
1 March

Rank	Name	Nationality	Time	Notes
1st place, gold medalist(s)	Luis Huaman	Peru	8:33.32	
2nd place, silver medalist(s)	Yeferson Cuno	Peru	8:33.33	
3rd place, bronze medalist(s)	Dylan Carrasco	Colombia	8:34.05	
4	Víctor Aguilar	Bolivia	8:39.52	
5	Wilmer Santos	Bolivia	8:41.94	
6	Martín Cuestas	Uruguay	8:59.96	
7	Antonio Gnecco	Colombia	9:27.92	
8	Gaspar Geymonat	Uruguay	9:35.41	
	Jessiel Páez	Ecuador	DNS	

=== 60 metres hurdles ===
Heats – 1 March

Rank	Heat	Name	Nationality	Time	Notes
1	1	Rafael Pereira	Brazil	7.65	Q
2	1	Martín Sáenz	Chile	7.69	Q
3	2	Marcos Herrera	Ecuador	7.71	Q
4	2	Eduardo de Deus	Brazil	7.90	Q
5	1	Francisco Ferreccio	Argentina	7.94	Q
6	2	Lorenzo Rossetto	Argentina	7.98	Q
7	1	Gino Toscano	Panama	8.13	q
8	1	Luis Claure	Bolivia	8.56	q
	2	Enrique Bellott	Bolivia	DNS	

Final – 1 March

Rank	Lane	Name	Nationality	Time	Notes
1st place, gold medalist(s)	4	Marcos Herrera	Ecuador	7.57	AR
2nd place, silver medalist(s)	5	Rafael Pereira	Brazil	7.62	
3rd place, bronze medalist(s)	3	Eduardo de Deus	Brazil	7.67	
4	6	Martín Sáenz	Chile	7.69	
5	2	Francisco Ferreccio	Argentina	7.94	
6	7	Lorenzo Rossetto	Argentina	7.96	
7	1	Gino Toscano	Panama	8.13	
8	8	Luis Claure	Bolivia	8.55	

=== 4 × 400 metres relay ===
1 March

Rank	Nation	Athletes	Time	Note
1st place, gold medalist(s)	Colombia	Adrián Mendoza, Cristian Ortega, Neiker Abello, Manuel Henao	3:16.92	NR
2nd place, silver medalist(s)	Argentina	Tomás Villegas, Francisco Ferreccio, Lorenzo Rossetto, Manuel Juárez	3:20.75	NR
3rd place, bronze medalist(s)	Bolivia	Nery Peñaloza, Leandro Daza, Josué Nieves, Ikenna Ibe-Akobi	3:22.60	
4	Uruguay	Aldo Monteiro, Jairo Moreira, Gonzalo Gervasini, Matías González	3:25.70	

=== High jump ===
1 March

Rank	Name	Nationality	1.90	2.00	2.05	2.08	2.11	2.14	2.17	2.20	2.23	2.26	Result	Notes
1st place, gold medalist(s)	Thiago Moura	Brazil	–	–	o	–	o	xo	xxo	o	o	xxx	2.23	
2nd place, silver medalist(s)	Fernando Ferreira	Brazil	–	–	o	o	o	o	xo	o	x–	xx	2.20	
3rd place, bronze medalist(s)	Nicolás Numair	Chile	–	–	o	–	o	xxo	o	xo	xxx		2.20	
4	Sebastián Daners	Uruguay	o	o	o	xxx							2.05	
	Sebastián Morinigo	Paraguay	xxx										NM	

=== Pole vault ===
28 February

Rank	Name	Nationality	4.90	5.10	5.20	5.30	5.35	5.40	5.45	Result	Notes
1st place, gold medalist(s)	Lucas Vicente	Brazil	o	o	o	x–	o	–	xxx	5.35	
2nd place, silver medalist(s)	Augusto Dutra de Oliveira	Brazil	–	o	–	o	–	xxx		5.30	

=== Long jump ===
1 March

Rank	Name	Nationality	#1	#2	#3	#4	#5	#6	Result	Notes
1st place, gold medalist(s)	Alexsandro Melo	Brazil	7.56	7.49	7.89	x	x	7.79	7.89	
2nd place, silver medalist(s)	Arnovis Dalmero	Colombia	7.88	6.12	x	x	x	x	7.88	
3rd place, bronze medalist(s)	Lucas dos Santos	Brazil	x	x	7.73	7.77	7.80	x	7.80	
4	Emiliano Lasa	Uruguay	7.59	7.55	7.38	–	7.66	7.62	7.80	
5	Eubrig Maza	Venezuela	7.32	x	7.26	x	7.66	x	7.66	
6	Luciano Ferrari	Argentina	7.22	x	x	7.34	x	7.26	7.34	
7	Óscar Cuéllar	Bolivia	6.95	7.05	r				7.05	
8	Carlos Orozco	Bolivia	6.76	6.76	6.16	–	6.72	x	6.72	
9	Aldo Monteiro	Uruguay	6.29	6.44	6.67				6.67	
	Alexander Villalba	Paraguay							DNS	
	Jemarance Werson	Suriname							DNS	

=== Triple jump ===
1 March

Rank	Name	Nationality	#1	#2	#3	#4	#5	#6	Result	Notes
1st place, gold medalist(s)	Elton Petronilho	Brazil	16.63	16.75	16.77	16.84	16.51	17.05	17.05	
2nd place, silver medalist(s)	Almir dos Santos	Brazil	15.76	15.99	16.15	16.39	16.43	x	16.43	
3rd place, bronze medalist(s)	Leodan Torrealba	Venezuela	15.95	16.18	16.12	16.05	13.96	15.99	16.18	
4	William Landinez	Venezuela	16.06	x	15.76	15.85	13.52	15.36	16.06	
5	Helber Melgarejo	Argentina	14.84	15.54	14.43	14.14	x	13.67	15.54	
6	Mauricio Rivera	Bolivia	x	14.07	–	x	x	13.47	14.07	
	Jemarance Werson	Suriname							DNS	

=== Shot put ===
1 March

Rank	Name	Nationality	#1	#2	#3	#4	#5	#6	Result	Notes
1st place, gold medalist(s)	Welington Morais	Brazil	19.80	x	19.87	20.74	20.64	20.76	20.76	
2nd place, silver medalist(s)	Willian Dourado	Brazil	19.57	19.68	19.42	19.95	19.08	20.25	20.25	
3rd place, bronze medalist(s)	Juan Manuel Arrieguez	Argentina	17.34	18.05	17.56	17.51	x	x	18.05	
4	Joaquín Ballivián	Chile	x	17.24	x	17.23	16.72	17.30	17.30	
5	Manuel Terán	Bolivia	13.94	14.37	15.02	x	15.49	15.54	15.54	

=== Heptathlon ===
28 February – 1 March

The highest mark recorded in each event is highlighted in yellow

Rank	Athlete	Nationality	60m	LJ	SP	HJ	60m H	PV	1000m	Points	Notes
1st place, gold medalist(s)	José Fernando Ferreira	Brazil	7.01	7.18	13.19	1.93	7.85	4.80	2:59.26	5696	
2nd place, silver medalist(s)	Pedro de Oliveira	Brazil	6.99	7.53	13.54	1.87	8.26	4.00	2:46.77	5549	
3rd place, bronze medalist(s)	Andy Preciado	Ecuador	7.09	6.59	14.97	2.05	8.14	4.00	3:14.88	5297	
	Enrique Bellott	Bolivia	7.21	6.18	11.06	NM	DNS	–	–	DNF	

== Women's results ==
=== 60 metres ===
Heats – 28 February

Rank	Heat	Name	Nationality	Time	Notes
1	1	Ana Carolina Azevedo	Brazil	7.25	Q
2	2	Gladymar Torres	Puerto Rico	7.33	
3	2	Gabriela Mourão	Brazil	7.34	Q
4	1	Glanyernis Guerra	Venezuela	7.35	Q
5	2	María Ignacia Montt	Chile	7.45	Q
6	1	Milagros D'Amico	Argentina	7.52	Q
7	2	Lauren Mendoza	Bolivia	7.59	Q
8	1	Paula Daruich	Peru	7.65	q
9	2	Aracely Pretell	Peru	7.67	q
10	1	Alinny Delgadillo	Bolivia	7.69	
10	2	Ruth Báez	Paraguay	7.69	
12	1	Ivana McFarlane	Panama	7.83	
	2	Isabela Buelvas	Colombia	DQ	

Final – 28 February

Rank	Lane	Name	Nationality	Time	Notes
1st place, gold medalist(s)	3	Ana Carolina Azevedo	Brazil	7.09	CR, AR
2nd place, silver medalist(s)	5	Gabriela Mourão	Brazil	7.23	
3rd place, bronze medalist(s)	6	Glanyernis Guerra	Venezuela	7.24	
4	4	María Ignacia Montt	Chile	7.36	
5	1	Paula Daruich	Peru	7.48	
6	8	Aracely Pretell	Peru	7.49	
7	2	Milagros D'Amico	Argentina	7.51	
8	7	Lauren Mendoza	Bolivia	7.60	

=== 400 metres ===
Heats – 28 February

Rank	Heat	Name	Nationality	Time	Notes
1	2	Melany Bolaño	Colombia	54.12	Q
2	2	María Florencia Lamboglia	Argentina	54.27	q
3	1	Noelia Martínez	Argentina	54.89	Q
4	1	Anny de Bassi	Brazil	56.00	q
5	1	Lucía Sotomayor	Bolivia	56.27	
6	2	Mariana Arce	Bolivia	1:00.34	
7	1	Jeruti Noguera	Paraguay	1:02.57	

Final – 1 March

Rank	Lane	Name	Nationality	Time	Notes
1st place, gold medalist(s)	4	María Florencia Lamboglia	Argentina	53.73	
2nd place, silver medalist(s)	3	Anny de Bassi	Brazil	53.96	
3rd place, bronze medalist(s)	5	Melany Bolaño	Colombia	54.34	
4	6	Noelia Martínez	Argentina	54.39	

=== 800 metres ===
1 March

Rank	Name	Nationality	Time	Notes
1st place, gold medalist(s)	Mayara Leite	Brazil	2:17.75	
2nd place, silver medalist(s)	Liliane Mariano	Brazil	2:18.09	
3rd place, bronze medalist(s)	Cecilia Gómez	Bolivia	2:20.83	
4	Christiane Tejerina	Bolivia	2:29.08	

=== 1500 metres ===
28 February

Rank	Name	Nationality	Time	Notes
1st place, gold medalist(s)	Benita Parra	Bolivia	4:30.18	
2nd place, silver medalist(s)	Gabriela Mamani	Bolivia	4:50.65	
3rd place, bronze medalist(s)	Antonella Bonomi	Uruguay	5:03.41	
	Anita Poma	Peru	DNS	

=== 3000 metres ===
1 March

Rank	Name	Nationality	Time	Notes
1st place, gold medalist(s)	Benita Parra	Bolivia	10:11.76	
2nd place, silver medalist(s)	Gabriela Mamani	Bolivia	10:36.07	
3rd place, bronze medalist(s)	Antonella Bonomi	Uruguay	11:04.53	
4	Suyeris Guerra	Panama	11:26.07	

=== 60 metres hurdles ===
Heats – 1 March

Rank	Heat	Name	Nationality	Time	Notes
1	1	María Fernanda Murillo	Colombia	8.06	Q
2	2	Vitoria Alves	Brazil	8.14	Q
3	1	Maribel Caicedo	Ecuador	8.20	Q
4	1	Catalina Rozas	Chile	8.50	Q
5	2	Leyka Archibold	Panama	8.94	Q
6	1	Sofía Ingold	Uruguay	9.19	q
7	1	Flor Choque	Bolivia	9.20	q
8	2	Keily Aguilar	Bolivia	9.87	Q
	2	Valentina González	Uruguay	DQ	FS
	1	Nancy Sandoval	El Salvador	DNS	
	2	Nathalie Almendarez	El Salvador	DNS	
	2	Isabela Buelvas	Colombia	DNS	

Final – 1 March

Rank	Lane	Name	Nationality	Time	Notes
1st place, gold medalist(s)	5	María Fernanda Murillo	Colombia	8.01	CR, NR
2nd place, silver medalist(s)	6	Maribel Caicedo	Ecuador	8.10	
3rd place, bronze medalist(s)	4	Vitoria Alves	Brazil	8.14	
4	7	Catalina Rozas	Chile	8.47	
5	3	Leyka Archibold	Panama	8.80	
6	1	Sofía Ingold	Uruguay	9.15	
7	8	Flor Choque	Bolivia	9.34	
8	2	Keily Aguilar	Bolivia	9.67	

=== 4 × 400 metres relay ===
1 March

Rank	Nation	Athletes	Time	Note
1st place, gold medalist(s)	Bolivia	Cecilia Gómez, Mariana Arce, Nayana Aramayo, Lucía Sotomayor	3:58.50	
2nd place, silver medalist(s)	Uruguay	Valentina González, Sofía Ingold, Millie Díaz, Antonella Bonomi	4:24.21	
	Colombia	Martha Araújo, Melany Bolaño, Estrella Lobo, María Fernanda Murillo	DQ	

=== High jump ===
1 March

Rank	Name	Nationality	1.55	1.60	1.65	1.70	1.73	1.76	1.79	1.82	Result	Notes
1st place, gold medalist(s)	Maria Eduarda de Oliveira	Brazil	–	–	o	o	o	xxo	xo	xxx	1.79	
2nd place, silver medalist(s)	Lorena Aires	Uruguay	–	–	o	o	o	xxx			1.73	
3rd place, bronze medalist(s)	Roberta dos Santos	Brazil	–	–	–	o	xxo	xxx			1.73	
4	Carla Ríos	Bolivia	o	o	xxx						1.60	
	Hellen Tenorio	Colombia									DNS	

=== Pole vault ===
1 March

Rank	Name	Nationality	3.60	3.80	3.90	4.00	4.10	4.15	4.20	Result	Notes
1st place, gold medalist(s)	Ayla Sakamoto	Brazil	–	o	o	xxo	xxo	–	xxx	4.10	
2nd place, silver medalist(s)	Beatriz Chagas	Brazil	–	o	–	o	–	xxx		4.00	
3rd place, bronze medalist(s)	Carolina Scarponi	Argentina	o	o	o	xxx				3.90	

=== Long jump ===
28 February

Rank	Name	Nationality	#1	#2	#3	#4	#5	#6	Result	Notes
1st place, gold medalist(s)	Natalia Linares	Colombia	6.72	6.70	6.73	6.71	6.67	6.46	6.73	CR, NR
2nd place, silver medalist(s)	Martha Araújo	Colombia	6.64	6.71	6.60	–	6.66	x	6.71	PB
	Alysbeth Félix	Puerto Rico	6.59	6.64	x	x	6.48	x	6.64	
3rd place, bronze medalist(s)	Leticia Oro Melo	Brazil	6.46	6.55	x	x	6.37	6.39	6.55	
4	Eliane Martins	Brazil	x	x	6.28	6.16	6.06	x	6.28	
5	Sofía Contreras	Chile	5.86	6.02	5.97	5.97	6.06	5.98	6.06	
6	Milagros D'Amico	Argentina	x	5.57	5.72	5.60	5.52	6.00	6.00	NR
7	Ornelis Ortiz	Venezuela	x	x	5.80	5.66	5.93	5.76	5.93	
8	Daniela Vaca	Bolivia	5.44	x	5.52	5.50	5.40	5.64	5.64	
	Paula Daruich	Peru							DNS	

=== Triple jump ===
1 March

Rank	Name	Nationality	#1	#2	#3	#4	#5	#6	Result	Notes
1st place, gold medalist(s)	Gabriele dos Santos	Brazil	13.54	13.81	13.73	13.78	13.54	13.84	13.84	
2nd place, silver medalist(s)	Regiclécia Cândido	Brazil	13.43	12.53	x	13.36	x	13.79	13.79	
3rd place, bronze medalist(s)	Valeria Quispe	Bolivia	x	12.94	x	x	12.94	13.06	13.06	
4	Genesis Pire	Venezuela	12.04	12.45	12.73	x	12.82	12.92	12.92	
5	Ornelis Ortiz	Venezuela	12.20	12.82	x	x	12.75	12.92	12.92	
6	Sofía Contreras	Chile	x	12.77	12.58	12.71	12.84	12.85	12.85	
7	Millie Díaz	Uruguay	12.07	12.28	12.09	12.00	12.03	12.36	12.36	
	Daniela Vaca	Bolivia	x	x	x	x	x	x	NM	

=== Shot put ===
28 March

Rank	Name	Nationality	#1	#2	#3	#4	#5	#6	Result	Notes
1st place, gold medalist(s)	Ivana Gallardo	Chile	x	x	17.53	18.02	x	x	18.02	CR
2nd place, silver medalist(s)	Ana Caroline Silva	Brazil	17.17	17.42	x	16.99	x	x	17.42	
3rd place, bronze medalist(s)	Mariela Pérez	Chile	15.61	14.96	x	15.35	16.23	15.91	16.23	
4	Rafaela de Sousa	Brazil	15.65	15.15	x	16.10	15.96	15.91	16.10	

=== Pentathlon ===
28 February

The highest mark recorded in each event is highlighted in yellow

Rank	Athlete	Nationality	60m H	HJ	SP	LJ	800m	Points	Notes
1st place, gold medalist(s)	Roberta dos Santos	Brazil	9.04	1.83	13.81	5.97	2:39.55	4117	CR
2nd place, silver medalist(s)	Mariam Buenanueva	Argentina	8.64	1.65	11.68	5.54	2:27.38	3860	
3rd place, bronze medalist(s)	Tamara de Sousa	Brazil	8.77	1.68	14.46	5.53	2:50.14	3785	
4	Estrella Lobo	Colombia	8.71	1.50	11.31	5.86	2:52.31	3455	NR
5	Sofía Ingold	Uruguay	9.24	1.50	8.57	5.39	2:42.47	3130	
