= 2025 South American Indoor Championships in Athletics – Results =

These are the full results of the 2025 South American Indoor Championships in Athletics which took place in Cochabamba, Bolivia, on 22 to 23 February at the Estadio de Atletismo del Gobierno Autónomo Municipal de Cochabamba.

== Men's results ==
=== 60 metres ===
Heats – 22 February

| Rank | Heat | Name | Nationality | Time | Notes |
|---|---|---|---|---|---|
| 1 | 2 | Neiker Abello | Colombia | 6.60 | Q |
| 2 | 2 | Bryant Alamo | Venezuela | 6.69 | Q |
| 3 | 2 | Franco Florio | Argentina | 6.69 | Q |
| 4 | 1 | Eubrig Maza | Venezuela | 6.70 | Q |
| 5 | 2 | Julian Vargas | Bolivia | 6.71 | q |
| 6 | 1 | Felipe Bardi | Brazil | 6.72 | Q |
| 7 | 1 | Carlos Palacios | Colombia | 6.75 (6.646) | Q |
| 8 | 1 | Arturo Deliser | Panama | 6.75 (6.649) | q |
| 9 | 1 | Daniel Londero | Argentina | 6.79 | |
| 10 | 2 | Aron Earl | Peru | 6.79 | |
| 11 | 2 | Erik Cardoso | Brazil | 6.80 | |
| 12 | 2 | Adrián Nicolari | Uruguay | 6.83 | |
| 13 | 1 | Jonathan Wolk | Paraguay | 6.86 | |
| 14 | 1 | Tito Hinojosa | Bolivia | 6.95 | |
| 15 | 1 | Álvaro Piñeyro | Uruguay | 7.09 | |

Final – 22 February

| Rank | Lane | Name | Nationality | Time | Notes |
|---|---|---|---|---|---|
| 1st place, gold medalist(s) | 4 | Neiker Abello | Colombia | 6.60 | |
| 2nd place, silver medalist(s) | 3 | Felipe Bardi | Brazil | 6.64 | |
| 3rd place, bronze medalist(s) | 2 | Franco Florio | Argentina | 6.67 | =NR |
| 4 | 6 | Eubrig Maza | Venezuela | 6.68 (6.672) | |
| 5 | 7 | Carlos Palacios | Colombia | 6.68 (6.674) | PB |
| 6 | 5 | Bryant Alamo | Venezuela | 6.70 | |
| 7 | 8 | Julian Vargas | Bolivia | 6.74 | |
| 8 | 1 | Arturo Deliser | Panama | 6.76 | |

=== 400 metres ===
Heats – 22 February

| Rank | Heat | Name | Nationality | Time | Notes |
|---|---|---|---|---|---|
| 1 | 2 | Kelvis Padrino | Venezuela | 47.87 | Q |
| 2 | 1 | Javier Gómez | Venezuela | 48.18 | Q |
| 3 | 2 | Marco Vilca | Peru | 48.31 | Q |
| 3 | 2 | Elián Larregina | Argentina | 48.31 | Q |
| 5 | 1 | Nicolás Salinas | Colombia | 48.53 | Q |
| 6 | 1 | Jeffrey Cajo | Peru | 48.57 | q |
| 7 | 2 | Douglas Mendes | Brazil | 48.95 | |
| 8 | 2 | Matías González | Uruguay | 49.16 | |
| 9 | 2 | Ikenna Ibe-Akobi | Bolivia | 49.30 | |
| 10 | 1 | Marcelo Pérez | Bolivia | 49.93 | |
| | 1 | Matheus Lima | Brazil | DNF | |

Final – 23 February

| Rank | Lane | Name | Nationality | Time | Notes |
|---|---|---|---|---|---|
| 1st place, gold medalist(s) | 3 | Elián Larregina | Argentina | 47.21 | |
| 2nd place, silver medalist(s) | 5 | Kelvis Padrino | Venezuela | 47.42 | |
| 3rd place, bronze medalist(s) | 6 | Javier Gómez | Venezuela | 47.91 | |
| 4 | 1 | Jeffrey Cajo | Peru | 48.09 | |
| 5 | 4 | Nicolás Salinas | Colombia | 48.15 | |
| | 2 | Marco Vilca | Peru | DNS | |

=== 800 metres ===
23 February

| Rank | Name | Nationality | Time | Notes |
|---|---|---|---|---|
| 1st place, gold medalist(s) | Leonardo Santos | Brazil | 1:49.94 | CR |
| 2nd place, silver medalist(s) | Marco Vilca | Peru | 1:51.01 | |
| 3rd place, bronze medalist(s) | Guilherme Orenhas | Brazil | 1:51.02 | |
| 4 | Jairo Moreira | Uruguay | 1:53.35 | NR |
| 5 | Ryan López | Venezuela | 1:54.20 | |
| 6 | Leandro Daza | Bolivia | 1:54.43 | |
| 7 | Omar Sotomayor | Bolivia | 1:54.90 | |

=== 1500 metres ===
22 February

| Rank | Name | Nationality | Time | Notes |
|---|---|---|---|---|
| 1st place, gold medalist(s) | Thiago André | Brazil | 3:50.09 | CR |
| 2nd place, silver medalist(s) | David Ninavia | Bolivia | 3:52.48 | NR |
| 3rd place, bronze medalist(s) | Yeferson Cuno | Peru | 3:59.27 | |
| 4 | Gonzalo Gervasini | Uruguay | 4:02.15 | |
| 5 | Víctor Aguilar | Bolivia | 4:03.29 | |
| 6 | Sebastián López | Venezuela | 4:04.91 | |
| 7 | Christian Vásconez | Ecuador | 4:05.80 | |
| 8 | Christian Escobar | Peru | 4:15.40 | |
| | Dylan Carrasco | Colombia | DQ | 17.3 |

=== 3000 metres ===
23 February

| Rank | Name | Nationality | Time | Notes |
|---|---|---|---|---|
| 1st place, gold medalist(s) | David Ninavia | Bolivia | 8:30.66 | |
| 2nd place, silver medalist(s) | Víctor Aguilar | Bolivia | 8:37.31 | |
| 3rd place, bronze medalist(s) | Yeferson Cuno | Peru | 8:38.83 | |
| 4 | Dylan Carrasco | Colombia | 8:39.18 | |
| 5 | Christian Vásconez | Ecuador | 8:57.47 | |

=== 60 metres hurdles ===
23 February

| Rank | Lane | Name | Nationality | Time | Notes |
|---|---|---|---|---|---|
| 1st place, gold medalist(s) | 5 | Eduardo de Deus | Brazil | 7.67 (7.662) | |
| 2nd place, silver medalist(s) | 3 | Thiago Ornelas | Brazil | 7.67 (7.667) | |
| 3rd place, bronze medalist(s) | 7 | Francisco Ferreccio | Argentina | 7.94 | |
| 4 | 2 | Renzo Cremaschi | Argentina | 7.97 | |
| 5 | 4 | Gerson Izaguirre | Venezuela | 8.05 | |
| 6 | 6 | Kevin Mendieta | Paraguay | 8.10 | |
| 7 | 8 | Josué Loaiza | Bolivia | 8.89 | |

=== 4 × 400 meters relay ===
23 February

| Rank | Nation | Athletes | Time | Note |
|---|---|---|---|---|
| 1st place, gold medalist(s) | Venezuela | Javier Gómez, Ryan López, Sebastián López, Kelvis Padrino | 3:18.29 | |
| 2nd place, silver medalist(s) | Bolivia | Marcelo Pérez, Nery Peñaloza, Bladimir Rueda, Ikenna Ibe-Akobi | 3:20.71 | |
| 3rd place, bronze medalist(s) | Argentina | Helber Melgarejo, Renzo Cremaschi, Franco Florio, Elián Larregina | 3:23.58 | NR |
| 4 | Uruguay | Alvaro Piñeyro, Jairo Moreira, Gonzalo Gervasini, Matías González | 3:29.89 | |

=== High jump ===
23 February

| Rank | Name | Nationality | 1.90 | 1.95 | 2.00 | 2.05 | 2.10 | 2.13 | 2.16 | 2.19 | 2.22 | 2.26 | Result | Notes |
|---|---|---|---|---|---|---|---|---|---|---|---|---|---|---|
| 1st place, gold medalist(s) | Thiago Moura | Brazil | – | – | – | o | o | – | o | xo | o | xxr | 2.22 | |
| 2nd place, silver medalist(s) | Fernando Ferreira | Brazil | – | – | – | o | o | o | xo | xx– | x | | 2.16 | |
| 3rd place, bronze medalist(s) | Sebastián Daners | Uruguay | – | xo | o | o | xxx | | | | | | 2.05 | |
| 4 | Santiago Barbería | Argentina | o | o | o | xo | xxx | | | | | | 2.05 | |
| 5 | Héctor Añez | Venezuela | o | o | xxx | | | | | | | | 1.95 | |
| | Sebastián Moringo | Paraguay | xxx | | | | | | | | | | NM | |

=== Long jump ===
23 February

| Rank | Name | Nationality | #1 | #2 | #3 | #4 | #5 | #6 | Result | Notes |
|---|---|---|---|---|---|---|---|---|---|---|
| 1st place, gold medalist(s) | Arnovis Dalmero | Colombia | x | x | 7.48 | 7.68 | 7.74 | 7.96 | 7.96 | |
| 2nd place, silver medalist(s) | José Luis Mandros | Peru | 7.84 | x | x | x | – | x | 7.84 | |
| 3rd place, bronze medalist(s) | Emiliano Lasa | Uruguay | 7.48 | 7.68 | 7.79 | 7.76 | 7.75 | 7.65 | 7.79 | |
| 4 | Eubrig Maza | Venezuela | x | 7.30 | 7.64 | 7.75 | x | x | 7.75 | |
| 5 | Lucas dos Santos | Brazil | 7.68 | x | x | x | x | x | 7.68 | |
| 6 | Breno Barbosa | Brazil | 7.21 | 7.43 | 7.29 | x | 7.56 | x | 7.56 | |
| 7 | Heber Melgarejo | Argentina | 6.80 | 6.88 | 6.91 | 6.77 | x | 6.92 | 6.92 | |
| 8 | Érick Suárez | Bolivia | 6.91 | x | x | 6.87 | x | x | 6.91 | |
| 9 | Doniquel Werson | Suriname | 6.45 | x | 6.88 | | | | 6.88 | |
| 10 | Alexander Villalba | Paraguay | x | 6.81 | x | | | | 6.81 | |
| 11 | Dusan Vlahovic | Bolivia | 6.80 | x | 6.61 | | | | 6.80 | |
| 12 | Gustavo Miño | Paraguay | 5.74 | 5.95 | 5.74 | | | | 5.95 | |

=== Triple jump ===
23 February

| Rank | Name | Nationality | #1 | #2 | #3 | #4 | #5 | #6 | Result | Notes |
|---|---|---|---|---|---|---|---|---|---|---|
| 1st place, gold medalist(s) | Elton Petronilho | Brazil | 16.50 | 16.51 | 16.45 | x | 14.74 | 16.52 | 16.52 | |
| 2nd place, silver medalist(s) | Almir dos Santos | Brazil | 15.99 | 16.07 | 16.16 | 15.66 | 16.39 | 15.58 | 16.39 | |
| 3rd place, bronze medalist(s) | Leodan Torrealba | Venezuela | x | x | 15.37 | 16.05 | x | 15.44 | 16.05 | |
| 4 | Luis Reyes | Chile | 13.82 | 15.54 | 15.86 | 14.58 | 15.69 | 15.68 | 15.86 | |
| 5 | Heber Melgarejo | Argentina | 15.31 | 15.72 | x | 15.31 | 15.15 | 15.81 | 15.81 | |
| 6 | Maximiliano Díaz | Argentina | 15.58 | 15.66 | 14.90 | 15.64 | 15.79 | 15.79 | 15.79 | |
| 7 | Doniquel Werson | Suriname | 15.06 | 15.16 | x | 15.64 | 15.24 | x | 15.64 | |
| 8 | Santiago Theran | Colombia | 15.33 | x | 15.47 | | | | 15.47 | |
| 9 | Mauricio Rivera | Bolivia | x | x | 14.37 | | | | 14.37 | |

=== Shot put ===
23 February

| Rank | Name | Nationality | #1 | #2 | #3 | #4 | #5 | #6 | Result | Notes |
|---|---|---|---|---|---|---|---|---|---|---|
| 1st place, gold medalist(s) | Welington Morais | Brazil | 19.58 | 20.30 | 20.71 | 20.31 | 20.41 | 20.92 | 20.92 | |
| 2nd place, silver medalist(s) | Willian Dourado | Brazil | 20.01 | 20.60 | 20.50 | 20.57 | x | 20.42 | 20.60 | |
| 3rd place, bronze medalist(s) | Juan Manuel Arrieguez | Argentina | 17.18 | 17.32 | x | 16.32 | 16.83 | 16.63 | 17.32 | |
| 4 | Mario González | Venezuela | 14.58 | x | x | x | x | 14.59 | 14.59 | |

=== Heptathlon ===
22–23 February

The highest mark recorded in each event is highlighted in yellow

| Rank | Athlete | Nationality | 60m | LJ | SP | HJ | 60m H | PV | 1000m | Points | Notes |
|---|---|---|---|---|---|---|---|---|---|---|---|
| 1st place, gold medalist(s) | José Fernando Ferreira | Brazil | 7.07 | 7.37 | 14.73 | 1.93 | 7.86 | 4.60 | 2:57.17 | 5773 | |
| 2nd place, silver medalist(s) | Pedro de Oliveira | Brazil | 6.89 | 7.69 | 14.35 | 1.87 | 8.10 | 3.80 | 2:45.95 | 5668 | |
| 3rd place, bronze medalist(s) | Gerson Izaguirre | Venezuela | 7.07 | 7.07 | 13.87 | 1.90 | 8.02 | 4.20 | 3:45.56 | 5060 | |
| 4 | Edgar Rosabal | Uruguay | 7.36 | 6.33 | 10.34 | 1.90 | 8.64 | 3.70 | 3:08.24 | 4586 | |
| | Enrique Bellott | Bolivia | 7.19 | 6.14 | 11.18 | 1.75 | 9.21 | DNS | – | DNF | |

== Women's results ==
=== 60 metres ===
Heats – 22 February

| Rank | Heat | Name | Nationality | Time | Notes |
|---|---|---|---|---|---|
| 1 | 1 | Ana Carolina Azevedo | Brazil | 7.26 | Q |
| 2 | 2 | Marlet Ospino | Colombia | 7.27 | Q |
| 3 | 2 | Anaís Hernández | Chile | 7.33 | Q |
| 4 | 1 | María Ignacia Montt | Chile | 7.40 | Q |
| 5 | 1 | Guadalupe Torrez | Bolivia | 7.47 | Q |
| 6 | 2 | María Florencia Lamboglia | Argentina | 7.47 | Q |
| 7 | 1 | Lauren Mendoza | Bolivia | 7.55 (7.541) | q |
| 8 | 1 | Belén Fritzsche | Argentina | 7.55 (7.544) | q |
| 9 | 2 | Paula Daruich | Peru | 7.65 | |
| 10 | 2 | Génesis Romero | Venezuela | 7.73 | |
| 11 | 1 | Ruth Baez | Paraguay | 8.10 | |
| | 2 | Vitória Cristina Rosa | Brazil | DNS | |

Final – 22 February

| Rank | Lane | Name | Nationality | Time | Notes |
|---|---|---|---|---|---|
| 1st place, gold medalist(s) | 4 | Ana Carolina Azevedo | Brazil | 7.16 | CR |
| 2nd place, silver medalist(s) | 5 | Marlet Ospino | Colombia | 7.22 | =NR |
| 3rd place, bronze medalist(s) | 3 | Anaís Hernández | Chile | 7.31 | |
| 4 | 6 | María Ignacia Montt | Chile | 7.32 | |
| 5 | 2 | Guadalupe Torrez | Bolivia | 7.39 | |
| 6 | 8 | Lauren Mendoza | Bolivia | 7.43 | NU23R |
| 7 | 7 | María Florencia Lamboglia | Argentina | 7.46 | |
| 8 | 1 | Belén Fritzsche | Argentina | 7.58 | |

=== 400 metres ===
23 February

| Rank | Lane | Name | Nationality | Time | Notes |
|---|---|---|---|---|---|
| 1st place, gold medalist(s) | 5 | María Florencia Lamboglia | Argentina | 55.35 | |
| 2nd place, silver medalist(s) | 6 | Ibeyis Romero | Venezuela | 56.44 | |
| 3rd place, bronze medalist(s) | 4 | Lucía Sotomayor | Bolivia | 56.95 | |

=== 800 metres ===
23 February

| Rank | Name | Nationality | Time | Notes |
|---|---|---|---|---|
| 1st place, gold medalist(s) | Jaqueline Weber | Brazil | 2:10.46 | |
| 2nd place, silver medalist(s) | María Rojas | Venezuela | 2:11.65 | |
| 3rd place, bronze medalist(s) | Cecilia Gómez | Bolivia | 2:13.61 | |
| | Anita Poma | Peru | DQ | R17.3 |

=== 1500 metres ===
22 February

| Rank | Name | Nationality | Time | Notes |
|---|---|---|---|---|
| 1st place, gold medalist(s) | Anita Poma | Peru | 4:23.74 | CR, NR |
| 2nd place, silver medalist(s) | Benita Parra | Bolivia | 4:30.18 | |
| 3rd place, bronze medalist(s) | July da Silva | Brazil | 4:37.14 | |
| 4 | Gabriela Mamani | Bolivia | 4:59.11 | |

=== 3000 metres ===
23 February

| Rank | Name | Nationality | Time | Notes |
|---|---|---|---|---|
| 1st place, gold medalist(s) | Benita Parra | Bolivia | 9:43.90 | CR |
| 2nd place, silver medalist(s) | Micaela Rivera Wood | Peru | 10:00.12 | |
| 3rd place, bronze medalist(s) | Gabriela Mamani | Bolivia | 11:00.21 | |
| | July da Silva | Brazil | DNS | |

=== 60 metres hurdles ===
Heats – 23 February

| Rank | Heat | Name | Nationality | Time | Notes |
|---|---|---|---|---|---|
| 1 | 2 | Ketiley Batista | Brazil | 8.20 | Q |
| 2 | 1 | Helen Bernard Stilling | Argentina | 8.35 | Q, NR |
| 3 | 1 | Génesis Romero | Venezuela | 8.37 | Q |
| 4 | 2 | Leyka Archibold | Panama | 8.67 | Q |
| 5 | 2 | Marlene Koss | Argentina | 8.75 | Q |
| 5 | 2 | Estrella Lobo | Colombia | 8.75 | Q |
| 7 | 1 | Millie Díaz | Uruguay | 9.09 | Q |
| 8 | 1 | Rossmary Paredes | Paraguay | 9.25 | q |
| 9 | 2 | Flor Choque | Bolivia | 9.42 | |
| 10 | 1 | Lucía Sotomayor | Bolivia | 10.15 | |

Final – 23 February

| Rank | Lane | Name | Nationality | Time | Notes |
|---|---|---|---|---|---|
| 1st place, gold medalist(s) | 4 | Ketiley Batista | Brazil | 8.11 | |
| 2nd place, silver medalist(s) | 5 | Helen Bernard Stilling | Argentina | 8.29 | NR |
| 3rd place, bronze medalist(s) | 3 | Génesis Romero | Venezuela | 8.30 | |
| 4 | 6 | Leyka Archibold | Panama | 8.53 | |
| 5 | 2 | Estrella Lobo | Colombia | 8.63 | |
| 6 | 7 | Marlene Koss | Argentina | 8.75 | |
| 7 | 8 | Rossmary Paredes | Paraguay | 9.25 | |
| 8 | 1 | Millie Díaz | Uruguay | 9.28 | |

=== 4 × 400 meters relay ===
23 February

| Rank | Nation | Athletes | Time | Note |
|---|---|---|---|---|
| 1st place, gold medalist(s) | Bolivia | Lucía Sotomayor, Mariana Arce, Nayana Aramayo, Cecilia Gómez | 3:56.34 | |
| 2nd place, silver medalist(s) | Argentina | Helen Bernard Stilling, Marlene Koss, Victoria Zanolli, Belén Fritzsche | 4:08.20 | |
| | Venezuela | | DNS | |

=== High jump ===
22 February

| Rank | Name | Nationality | 1.55 | 1.60 | 1.65 | 1.70 | 1.73 | 1.76 | 1.82 | 1.84 | Result | Notes |
|---|---|---|---|---|---|---|---|---|---|---|---|---|
| 1st place, gold medalist(s) | Arielly Monteiro | Brazil | – | – | – | o | o | o | xxo | xxx | 1.82 | |
| 2nd place, silver medalist(s) | Lorena Aires | Uruguay | – | – | o | o | xxo | xxx | | | 1.73 | |
| 3rd place, bronze medalist(s) | Valdiléia Martins | Brazil | – | – | o | o | xxx | | | | 1.70 | |
| 4 | Carla Ríos | Bolivia | o | o | xxo | xxo | xxx | | | | 1.70 | |

=== Pole vault ===
23 February

| Rank | Name | Nationality | 3.60 | 3.70 | 3.80 | 3.90 | 4.00 | 4.05 | 4.10 | 4.15 | 4.20 | 4.25 | 4.30 | Result | Notes |
|---|---|---|---|---|---|---|---|---|---|---|---|---|---|---|---|
| 1st place, gold medalist(s) | Beatriz Chagas | Brazil | – | – | o | o | xxo | o | xo | xo | xo | o | xxx | 4.25 | |
| 2nd place, silver medalist(s) | Isabel de Quadros | Brazil | – | – | xxo | o | xo | xo | – | o | xxo | xx– | x | 4.20 | |
| 3rd place, bronze medalist(s) | Carolina Scarponi | Argentina | o | o | o | xo | xxo | o | xxx | | | | | 4.05 | |

=== Long jump ===
22 February

| Rank | Name | Nationality | #1 | #2 | #3 | #4 | #5 | #6 | Result | Notes |
|---|---|---|---|---|---|---|---|---|---|---|
| 1st place, gold medalist(s) | Natalia Linares | Colombia | 6.18 | 6.48 | 6.38 | 6.64 | 6.45 | x | 6.64 | CR, NR |
| 2nd place, silver medalist(s) | Nathalee Aranda | Panama | 6.38 | 6.23 | 6.42 | 6.39 | 6.40 | x | 6.42 | |
| 3rd place, bronze medalist(s) | Eliane Martins | Brazil | 6.18 | x | x | x | 6.24 | 6.19 | 6.24 | |
| 4 | Ornelis Ortiz | Venezuela | 5.89 | 6.24 | 6.05 | 5.54 | 6.00 | 6.04 | 6.24 | |
| 5 | Victoria Zanolli | Argentina | 5.36 | 5.98 | 5.78 | 5.70 | 5.62 | 5.72 | 5.98 | NR |
| 6 | Daniela Vaca | Bolivia | 5.74 | x | 4.22 | 5.77 | x | 5.92 | 5.92 | |
| 7 | Paula Daruich | Peru | 3.84 | 5.64 | 5.73 | 5.68 | 5.84 | 5.80 | 5.84 | |
| 8 | Marlene Koss | Argentina | x | 5.28 | 5.47 | 5.40 | 5.60 | 5.61 | 5.61 | |
| 9 | Rossmary Paredes | Paraguay | 4.88 | x | 5.09 | | | | 5.09 | |

=== Triple jump ===
23 February

| Rank | Name | Nationality | #1 | #2 | #3 | #4 | #5 | #6 | Result | Notes |
|---|---|---|---|---|---|---|---|---|---|---|
| 1st place, gold medalist(s) | Regiclecia da Silva | Brazil | 13.85 | x | x | x | 14.00 | 14.17 | 14.17 | CR, NR |
| 2nd place, silver medalist(s) | Gabriele dos Santos | Brazil | x | x | 13.47 | 13.40 | x | 13.46 | 13.47 | |
| 3rd place, bronze medalist(s) | Valeria Quispe | Bolivia | x | 13.17 | 12.86 | x | x | x | 13.17 | |
| 4 | Ornelis Ortiz | Venezuela | x | 13.15 | x | 12.67 | 13.06 | 12.94 | 13.15 | |
| 5 | Liuba Zaldívar | Ecuador | 12.57 | 12.75 | 12.90 | – | 12.64 | 12.58 | 12.90 | |
| 6 | Estrella Lobo | Colombia | 12.06 | x | 12.23 | x | x | 12.32 | 12.32 | |
| 7 | Millie Díaz | Uruguay | 12.29 | 11.93 | 11.99 | 11.83 | 12.19 | x | 12.29 | |
| | Daniela Vaca | Bolivia | x | x | x | r | | | NM | |

=== Shot put ===
22 February

| Rank | Name | Nationality | #1 | #2 | #3 | #4 | #5 | #6 | Result | Notes |
|---|---|---|---|---|---|---|---|---|---|---|
| 1st place, gold medalist(s) | Ivana Gallardo | Chile | 16.83 | 15.93 | 17.63 | 17.31 | 16.27 | x | 17.63 | |
| 2nd place, silver medalist(s) | Ana Caroline Silva | Brazil | 15.88 | 16.33 | x | 16.14 | 16.65 | 16.46 | 16.65 | |
| 3rd place, bronze medalist(s) | Lívia Avancini | Brazil | x | 15.92 | x | 15.41 | 15.58 | 15.84 | 15.92 | |

=== Pentathlon ===
22 February

The highest mark recorded in each event is highlighted in yellow

| Rank | Athlete | Nationality | 60m H | HJ | SP | LJ | 800m | Points | Notes |
|---|---|---|---|---|---|---|---|---|---|
| 1st place, gold medalist(s) | Tamara de Sousa | Brazil | 8.73 | 1.70 | 13.88 | 5.56 | 2:49.73 | 4294 | |
| 2nd place, silver medalist(s) | Roberta dos Santos | Brazil | 9.04 | 1.73 | 12.40 | 5.81 | 2:48.96 | 4253 | |
| 3rd place, bronze medalist(s) | Ana Paula Argüello | Paraguay | 8.70 | 1.55 | 12.13 | 5.75 | 3:17.41 | 3395 | |
| 4 | Sofía Ingold | Uruguay | 9.29 | 1.52 | 8.71 | 5.25 | 3:01.85 | 2915 | |
| 5 | Melissa Mendieta | Paraguay | 9.52 | 1.49 | 11.04 | 4.82 | 3:10.77 | 2881 | |
