= South American Indoor Championships in Athletics =

Biennial track and field competition in South America

- Status: active
- Genre: South American Championship; Indoor track and field
- Date: February
- Frequency: biennial
- Country: varying
- Inaugurated: 2020
- Previous event: 2024
- Next event: 2026
- Organiser: CONSUDATLE

The South American Indoor Championships in Athletics (Spanish: Campeonato Sudamericano de Pista Cubierta) is a biennial indoor track and field competition for athletes from South America, organised by CONSUDATLE. The first edition was staged in 2020, making it the third continent to organise such an event (following the European Athletics Indoor Championships in 1966 and Asian Indoor Athletics Championships in 2004). It is the indoor counterpart to the biennial South American Championships in Athletics.

== Editions ==
Edition	Year	City	Country	Date	Venue	Events	Nations	Athletes	Top of the medal table
1	2020	Cochabamba	Bolivia	1–2 February	Estadio Municipal de Cochabamba	26	10	101	Brazil (BRA)
2	2022	Cochabamba	Bolivia	19–20 February	Estadio Municipal de Cochabamba	26	11	117	Brazil (BRA)
3	2024	Cochabamba	Bolivia	27–28 January	Estadio Municipal de Cochabamba	26	10	125	Brazil (BRA)
4	2025	Cochabamba	Bolivia	22–23 February	Estadio Municipal de Cochabamba	25	12	139	Brazil (BRA)
5	2026	Cochabamba	Bolivia	28 February – 1 March	Estadio Municipal de Cochabamba	26	12	146	Brazil (BRA)

== Participation ==
Eleven member federations of CONSUDATLE have participated in the championships.

- Argentina
- Bolivia
- Brazil
- Chile
- Colombia
- Ecuador
- Panama
- Paraguay
- Peru
- Suriname
- Uruguay
- Venezuela

== Medals (2020-2026) ==
Rank	Nation	Gold	Silver	Bronze	Total
1	Brazil	67	44	32	143
2	Bolivia	19	19	14	52
3	Venezuela	8	15	10	33
4	Colombia	8	7	7	22
5	Argentina	7	12	24	43
6	Peru	6	9	10	25
7	Uruguay	4	9	3	16
8	Chile	4	8	7	19
9	Panama	3	1	0	4
10	Ecuador	2	2	1	5
11	Suriname	1	0	0	1
12	Paraguay	0	0	2	2
Totals (12 entries)		129	126	110	365

1. 2020: 26, 24, 19
2. 2022: 26, 26, 22
3. 2024: 26, 25, 21
4. 2025: 25, 25, 24
5. 2026: 26, 26, 24

== Championships records ==
=== Men ===
Event	Record	Athlete	Nation	Date	Edition	Place	Ref.
60 m	6.56 A	Gabriel dos Santos	Brazil	28 February 2026	2026	Cochabamba, Bolivia	
200 m	20.81 A	Virjilio Griggs	Panama	2 February 2020	2020	Cochabamba, Bolivia	
400 m	46.37 A	Elián Larregina	Argentina	28 January 2024	2024	Cochabamba, Bolivia	
800 m	1:47.58 A	Eduardo Moreira	Brazil	1 March 2026	2026	Cochabamba, Bolivia	
1500 m	3:50.09 A	Thiago André	Brazil	22 February 2025	2025	Cochabamba, Bolivia	
3000 m	8:26.73 A	David Ninavia	Bolivia	28 January 2024	2024	Cochabamba, Bolivia	
60 m hurdles	7.57 A AR	Marcos Herrera	Ecuador	1 March 2026	2026	Cochabamba, Bolivia	
High jump	2.25 m A	Fernando Ferreira	Brazil	2 February 2020	2020	Cochabamba, Bolivia	
Pole vault	5.50 m A	Germán Chiaraviglio	Argentina	2 February 2020	2020	Cochabamba, Bolivia	
Pole vault	5.50 m A	Augusto Dutra de Oliveira	Brazil	19 February 2022	2022	Cochabamba, Bolivia	
Long jump	8.17 m A NR	José Luis Mandros	Peru	20 February 2022	2022	Cochabamba, Bolivia	
Triple jump	17.10 m A	Alexsandro Melo	Brazil	2 February 2020	2020	Cochabamba, Bolivia	
Shot put	21.71 m A AR	Darlan Romani	Brazil	20 February 2022	2022	Cochabamba, Bolivia	
Heptathlon	5799 pts A	Felipe dos Santos	Brazil	19–20 February 2022	2022	Cochabamba, Bolivia	
Heptathlon	60m / Long jump / Shot put / High jump / 60m H / Pole vault / 1000m; 6.75 / 7.10 m / 14.00 m / 2.00 m / 7.78 / 4.70 m / 3:06.71						
4 × 400 m relay	3:11.41 A	Javier Gómez; Julio Rodríguez; Kelvis Padrino; José Antonio Maita	Venezuela	28 January 2024	2024	Cochabamba, Bolivia	

=== Women ===
Event	Record	Athlete	Nation	Date	Edition	Place	Ref.
60 m	7.09 A	Ana Carolina Azevedo	Brazil	28 February 2026	2026	Cochabamba, Bolivia	
200 m	24.19 A	Natalia Linares	Colombia	2 February 2020	2020	Cochabamba, Bolivia	
400 m	53.34 A	Tiffani Marinho	Brazil	1 February 2020	2020	Cochabamba, Bolivia	
800 m	2:08.20 A NR	María Pía Fernández	Uruguay	28 January 2024	2024	Cochabamba, Bolivia	
1500 m	4:23.74 A NR	Anita Poma	Peru	22 February 2025	2025	Cochabamba, Bolivia	
3000 m	9:43.90 A	Benita Parra	Bolivia	23 February 2025	2025	Cochabamba, Bolivia	
60 m hurdles	8.01 A NR	María Fernanda Murillo	Colombia	1 March 2026	2026	Cochabamba, Bolivia	
High jump	1.85 m A	Valdiléia Martins	Brazil	28 January 2024	2024	Cochabamba, Bolivia	
Pole vault	4.20 m A	Beatriz Chagas	Brazil	28 January 2024	2024	Cochabamba, Bolivia	
Long jump	6.73 m A NR	Natalia Linares	Colombia	28 February 2026	2026	Cochabamba, Bolivia	
Triple jump	14.17 m A	Regiclecia da Silva	Brazil	23 February 2025	2025	Cochabamba, Bolivia	
Shot put	18.02 m A	Ivana Gallardo	Chile	28 February 2026	2026	Cochabamba, Bolivia	
Pentathlon	4117 pts A	Roberta dos Santos	Brazil	28 February 2026	2026	Cochabamba, Bolivia	
Pentathlon	60m H / High jump / Shot put / Long jump / 800m; 9.04 / 1.83 m / 13.81 m / 5.97 m / 2:39.55						
4 × 400 m relay	3:47.37 A AR	Lucía Sotomayor; Mariana Arce; Norelia Guasace; Cecilia Gómez	Bolivia	20 February 2022	2022	Cochabamba, Bolivia	
