= Marco Vilca =

Peruvian middle-distance runner (born 2000)

Marco Antonio Vilca
Personal information
- Full name: Marco Antonio Vilca Gonzales
- Born: December 2, 2000 (age 25) Arequipa, Peru

Sport
- Sport: Athletics
- Events: 400 metres; 800 metres; 4 × 100 metres relay; 4 × 400 metres relay
Medal record
Representing Peru
Men's athletics
Event	1st	2nd	3rd
Ibero-American Championships	0	0	1
South American Championships	0	0	2
South American Indoor Championships	0	3	2
Bolivarian Games	0	0	1
South American U23 Championships in Athletics	0	1	1
South American U20 Championships	1	0	1
South American U18 Championships	0	1	0
Total	1	5	8
Ibero-American Championships
Bronze medal – third place	2018 Trujillo	4×400 m relay
South American Championships
Bronze medal – third place	2019 Lima	800 m
Bronze medal – third place	2025 Mar del Plata	800 m
South American Indoor Championships
Silver medal – second place	2020 Cochabamba	400 m
Silver medal – second place	2020 Cochabamba	800 m
Silver medal – second place	2025 Cochabamba	800 m
Bronze medal – third place	2024 Cochabamba	800 m
Bronze medal – third place	2026 Cochabamba	800 m
Bolivarian Games
Bronze medal – third place	2022 Valledupar	800 m
South American U23 Championships
Silver medal – second place	2018 Cuenca	800 m
Bronze medal – third place	2022 Cascavel	800 m
South American U20 Championships
Gold medal – first place	2019 Cali	800 m
Bronze medal – third place	2019 Cali	400 m
South American U18 Championships
Silver medal – second place	2016 Concordia	800 m

Marco Antonio Vilca Gonzales (born 2 December 2000) is a Peruvian middle-distance runner specialising in the 800 metres. He has won several medals at continental level.

His twin sister Sheyla Vilca is also a runner.

== International competitions ==
Year	Competition	Venue	Position	Event	Notes
Representing Peru
2016	South American U18 Championships	Concordia, Argentina	2nd	800 m	1:58.37
2017	World U18 Championships	Nairobi, Kenya	9th (h)	800 m	1:51.95
2017	Pan American U20 Championships	Trujillo, Peru	5th	800 m	1:53.00
2018	South American Games	Cochabamba, Bolivia	8th	400 m	48.04
2018	South American Games	Cochabamba, Bolivia	4th	800 m	1:52.03
2018	World U20 Championships	Tampere, Finland	21st (h)	800 m	1:50.47
2018	Ibero-American Championships	Trujillo, Peru	4th	800 m	1:49.82
2018	Ibero-American Championships	Trujillo, Peru	3rd	4 × 400 m relay	3:15.59
2018	South American U23 Championships	Cuenca, Ecuador	2nd	800 m	1:50.52
2018	South American U23 Championships	Cuenca, Ecuador	5th	4 × 100 m relay	42.52
2019	South American Championships	Lima, Peru	3rd	800 m	1:48.06
2019	South American U20 Championships	Cali, Colombia	3rd	400 m	47.41
2019	South American U20 Championships	Cali, Colombia	1st	800 m	1:48.86
2019	Pan American U20 Championships	San José, Costa Rica	9th (h)	800 m	1:52.63
2019	Pan American Games	Lima, Peru	5th	800 m	1:47.65
2020	South American Indoor Championships	Cochabamba, Bolivia	2nd	400 m	47.84 NR
2020	South American Indoor Championships	Cochabamba, Bolivia	2nd	800 m	1:54.11 NR
2021	South American U23 Championships	Guayaquil, Ecuador	4th	800 m	1:49.49
2022	Bolivarian Games	Valledupar, Colombia	3rd	800 m	1:48.77
2022	South American U23 Championships	Cascavel, Brazil	3rd	800 m	1:49.69
2022	South American U23 Championships	Cascavel, Brazil	6th	4 × 400 m relay	3:18.74
2023	Pan American Games	Santiago, Chile	14th (h)	800 m	1:49.55
2024	South American Indoor Championships	Cochabamba, Bolivia	3rd	800 m	1:55.04
2024	Ibero-American Championships	Cuiabá, Brazil	4th	800 m	1:46.39 NR
2024	Ibero-American Championships	Cuiabá, Brazil	5th	4 × 400 m relay	3:15.94
2025	South American Indoor Championships	Cochabamba, Bolivia	3rd (h)	400 m	48.31^{1}
2025	South American Indoor Championships	Cochabamba, Bolivia	2nd	800 m	1:51.01
2025	South American Championships	Mar del Plata, Argentina	3rd	800 m	1:50.93
2025	South American Championships	Mar del Plata, Argentina	6th	4 × 400 m relay	3:14.26
2025	Bolivarian Games	Lima, Peru	—N/a	4 × 400 m relay	DNF
2026	South American Indoor Championships	Cochabamba, Bolivia	3rd	800 m	1:49.95
2026	Ibero-American Championships	Lima, Peru	12th (h)	800 m	1:48.57
2026	Ibero-American Championships	Lima, Peru	9th	4 × 400 m relay	3:13.71
2026	South American Games	Santa Fe, Argentina	6th	800 m	1:48.71

^{1}Did not start in the final

== Personal bests ==
Outdoor

- 400 metres – 46.76 (Lima 2025)
- 800 metres – 1:46.39 NR (Cuiabá 2024)
