= Welington Morais =

Brazilian shot putter (born 1996)

Personal information
- Born: 6 September 1996 (age 30) Imperatriz, Maranhão, Brazil
- Height: 1.85 m (6 ft 1 in)
- Weight: 115 kg (254 lb)

Sport
- Sport: Track and field
- Event: Shot put
- Club: Pinheiros
- Coached by: Ricardo Souza Barros

Achievements and titles
- Personal best: 21.18 m (2026)
Medal record
Men's athletics
Representing Brazil
South American Games
Gold medal – first place	2022 Asunción	Shot put
Silver medal – second place	2026 Santa Fe	Shot put
South American Championships
Gold medal – first place	2021 Guayaquil	Shot put
Ibero-American Championships
Silver medal – second place	2022 La Nucía	Shot put
South American U23 Championships
Gold medal – first place	2018 Cuenca	Shot put
South American Junior Championships
Silver medal – second place	2015 Cuenca	Shot put
South American Youth Championships
Silver medal – second place	2012 Mendoza	Javelin throw

Welington Silva Morais (born 6 September 1996) is a Brazilian track and field athlete who specialises in the shot put. He was the gold medallist at the 2021 South American Championships and the silver medallist at the 2022 Ibero-American Championships.

== Early years ==
Welington Silva Morais was born in Imperatriz, Maranhão on 6 September 1996. He began training in athletics in 2010 at the suggestion of a teacher who observed him playing dodgeball. Morais won some local titles before moving to the city of Londrina to continue his training. He saw a rapid improvement in his results, winning the silver medal in the javelin throw (700 g) at the 2012 South American Youth Championships in Argentina. The following year he won a gold medal in the shot put event at the Jogos Escolares da Juventude (Juvenile School Games); his mother surprised him by travelling to the city of Belém to see him compete for the first time.

== Career ==
After settling on the shot put as his discipline, Morais captured the silver medal at the 2015 South American Junior Championships in Ecuador. He also competed at the Pan American Junior Championships two months later in Canada, though he did not medal. In 2018, Morais won a bronze medal at the Troféu Brasil de Atletismo by reaching 19.37 m. Two weeks later he won the 2018 South American U23 Championships with a personal best throw of 19.85 m, coming within 7 centimetres of the championship record.

In mid-2019, Morais competed at both the Summer Universiade in Italy and the Pan American Games in Peru, though he failed to reach the podium at either. However, that September, he repeated as a bronze medallist at the Troféu Brasil de Atletismo before capturing the Brazilian university title. Morais followed this up with a silver-medal performance at the 2020 Troféu Brasil de Atletismo, recording a throw of 19.43 m while Darlan Romani captured his ninth consecutive national title.

On 26 March 2021, Morais threw 20.28 m for a first-place finish at the Reynaldo Berto Gorno South American Grand Prix in Uruguay. It was the first time he surpassed the 20-metre mark and was the second-farthest throw ever by a Brazilian, behind only Darlan Romani's 22.61 m. Morais then won the gold medal at the 2021 South American Championships in Ecuador with a throw of 19.87 m, though he failed to get onto the podium at the national championships after finishing in fourth place.

Morais improved to 20.60 m for a third-place finish at the Torneio Internacional de Atletismo São Paulo in April 2022. He won the silver medal at the Ibero-American Championships in Spain the following month. He achieved a new personal best mark of 20.78 m but once again finished behind Darlan Romani, who recorded a championship record throw of 21.70 m.

At the World Athletics Challenge, in the city of Concepción del Uruguay (Argentina), in April 2024, he became the 2nd Brazilian in history to throw over 21m, after Darlan Romani. He reached the mark of 21.01m.

== Achievements ==
All information taken from World Athletics profile.

=== Personal bests ===
Type	Event	Time	Date	Place	Notes
Outdoor	Shot put	21.18 m	18 April 2026	Buenos Aires, Argentina	
Outdoor	Discus throw	46.94 m	13 September 2019	Fortaleza, Brazil	
Outdoor	Javelin throw	57.76 m	21 September 2013	São Paulo, Brazil	

=== International competitions ===
Year	Competition	Venue	Position	Event	Notes
Representing Brazil
2012	South American Youth Championships	Mendoza, Argentina	2nd	Javelin throw (700 g)	63.59 m
2015	South American Junior Championships	Cuenca, Ecuador	2nd	Shot put (6 kg)	18.24 m
2015	Pan American Junior Championships	Edmonton, Canada	7th	Shot put (6 kg)	17.85 m
2018	South American U23 Championships	Cuenca, Ecuador	1st	Shot put	19.85 m
2019	Universiade	Naples, Italy	—	Shot put	NM
2019	Pan American Games	Lima, Peru	7th	Shot put	19.22 m
2021	South American Championships	Guayaquil, Ecuador	1st	Shot put	19.87 m
2022	Ibero-American Championships	Guayaquil, Ecuador	2nd	Shot put	20.78 m PB
2022	World Championships	Eugene, United States	19th (q)	Shot put	19.80 m
2022	South American Games	Asunción, Paraguay	1st	Shot put	20.00 m
2023	South American Championships	São Paulo, Brazil	1st	Shot put	20.59 m
2023	World Championships	Budapest, Hungary	17th (q)	Shot put	20.30 m
2023	Pan American Games	Santiago, Chile	5th	Shot put	20.26 m
2024	South American Indoor Championships	Cochabamba, Bolivia	3rd	Shot put	19.50 m
2024	Ibero-American Championships	Cuiabá, Brazil	3rd	Shot put	20.51 m
2024	Olympic Games	Paris, France	–	Shot put	NM
2025	South American Indoor Championships	Cochabamba, Bolivia	1st	Shot put	20.92 m
2025	World Indoor Championships	Nanjing, China	11th	Shot put	20.13 m
2025	South American Championships	Mar del Plata, Argentina	2nd	Shot put	20.28 m
2026	South American Indoor Championships	Cochabamba, Bolivia	1st	Shot put	20.76 m
2026	World Indoor Championships	Toruń, Poland	13th	Shot put	19.91 m
2026	South American Games	Santa Fe, Argentina	2nd	Shot put	20.19 m

=== National titles ===
- National University Championships
  - Shot put: 2019
- National U23 Championships
  - Shot put: 2018
- National Junior Championships
  - Shot put (6 kg): 2015
- National U18 Championships
  - Javelin throw (700 g): 2012
