= Gabriele dos Santos =

Brazilian athletics competitor

Personal information
- Full name: Gabriele Sousa dos Santos
- Born: 23 February 1995 (age 31) Rio de Janeiro, Brazil
- Height: 1.75 m (5 ft 9 in)
- Weight: 63 kg (139 lb)

Sport
- Sport: Athletics
- Event: Triple jump
- Club: E.C. Pinhe

Gabriele Sousa dos Santos (born 23 February 1995) is a Brazilian athlete specialising in the triple jump. She represented her country at two outdoor and one indoor World Championships. In addition, she has won multiple medals on regional level.

== International competitions ==
Year	Competition	Venue	Position	Event	Notes
Representing Brazil
2012	South American Youth Championships	Mendoza, Argentina	1st	Long jump	5.79 m
2012	South American Youth Championships	Mendoza, Argentina	2nd	Triple jump	12.51 m
2013	South American Championships	Cartagena, Colombia	5th	Triple jump	13.13 m
2013	Pan American Junior Championships	Medellín, Colombia	2nd	Triple jump	13.35 m
2013	South American Junior Championships	Resistencia, Argentina	2nd	Triple jump	13.37 m
2014	World Junior Championships	Eugene, United States	13th (q)	Triple jump	13.13 m
2019	South American Championships	Lima, Peru	3rd	Triple jump	13.30 m
2020	South American Indoor Championships	Cochabamba, Bolivia	OC^{1}	Triple jump	13.92 m
2021	South American Championships	Guayaquil, Ecuador	3rd	Triple jump	13.45 m
2022	South American Indoor Championships	Cochabamba, Bolivia	1st	Triple jump	14.04 m
2022	Ibero-American Championships	La Nucía, Spain	6th	Triple jump	13.89 m
2022	World Championships	Eugene, United States	25th (q)	Triple jump	13.62 m
2022	South American Games	Asunción, Paraguay	1st	Triple jump	13.74 m
2023	South American Championships	São Paulo, Brazil	1st	Triple jump	13.92 m
2023	World Championships	Budapest, Hungary	23rd (q)	Triple jump	13.66 m
2023	Pan American Games	Santiago, Chile	4th	Triple jump	13.65 m
2024	South American Indoor Championships	Cochabamba, Bolivia	1st	Triple jump	14.04 m
2024	World Indoor Championships	Glasgow, United Kingdom	14th	Triple jump	13.45 m
2024	Ibero-American Championships	Cuiabá, Brazil	1st	Triple jump	13.68 m
2024	Olympic Games	Paris, France	27th (q)	Triple jump	13.63 m
2025	South American Indoor Championships	Cochabamba, Bolivia	2nd	Triple jump	13.47 m
2025	South American Championships	Mar del Plata, Argentina	1st	Triple jump	13.96 m
2025	World Championships	Tokyo, Japan	28th (q)	Triple jump	13.54 m
2026	South American Indoor Championships	Cochabamba, Bolivia	1st	Triple jump	13.84 m
2026	Ibero-American Championships	Lima, Peru	1st	Triple jump	14.06 m
2026	Pan American Championships	Medellín, Colombia	1st	Triple jump	14.18 m
2026	World Ultimate Championship	Budapest, Hungary	7th	Triple jump	13.06 m
2026	South American Games	Santa Fe, Argentina	1st	Triple jump	13.57 m

^{1} Out of competition performance

== Personal bests ==
Outdoor

- Long jump – 6.39 (+1.4 m/s, São Paulo 2014)
- Triple jump – 14.17 (-1.0 m/s, São Paulo 2020)

Indoor

- Triple jump – 14.04 (Cochabamba 2024)
