= Valeria Quispe =

Bolivian track & field athlete (born 1997)

Personal information
- Full name: Valeria Quispe Fuentes
- Born: 2 September 1997 (age 29) Tarija, Bolivia
- Height: 1.65 m (5 ft 5 in)
- Weight: 56 kg (123 lb)

Sport
- Sport: Athletics
- Event: Triple jump

Valeria Quispe Fuentes (born 2 September 1997) is a Bolivian athlete specialising in the triple jump. She won several medals at regional level including a bronze at the 2024 Ibero-American Championships. She also holds multiple national records in various events and age categories.

== International competitions ==
Year	Competition	Venue	Position	Event	Notes
Representing Bolivia
2012	South American Youth Championships	Mendoza, Argentina	6th	Triple jump	11.79 m
2013	South American Junior Championships	Resistencia, Argentina	7th	Long jump	5.21 m
2013	South American Junior Championships	Resistencia, Argentina	4th	Triple jump	12.30 m (w)
2013	Bolivarian Games	Trujillo, Peru	9th	Long jump	5.48 m (w)
2013	Bolivarian Games	Trujillo, Peru	7th	Triple jump	12.62 m (w)
2014	South American Games	Santiago, Chile	7th	Long jump	5.51 m
2014	South American Games	Santiago, Chile	6th	Triple jump	12.75 m
2014	Pan American Sports Festival	Mexico City, Mexico	5th	Long jump	5.93 m (w)
2014	Pan American Sports Festival	Mexico City, Mexico	8th	Triple jump	12.63 m
2014	South American Youth Championships	Cali, Colombia	4th	Long jump	5.67 m
2014	South American Youth Championships	Cali, Colombia	2nd	Triple jump	12.58 m
2015	South American Junior Championships	Cuenca, Ecuador	6th	Long jump	5.64 m
2015	South American Junior Championships	Cuenca, Ecuador	2nd	Triple jump	12.92 m
2015	South American Championships	Lima, Peru	6th	Triple jump	12.56 m
2015	Pan American Junior Championships	Edmonton, Canada	11th	Long jump	5.48 m
2015	Pan American Junior Championships	Edmonton, Canada	6th	Triple jump	12.34 m
2016	South American U23 Championships	Lima, Peru	3rd	Triple jump	12.74 m
2017	South American Championships	Asunción, Paraguay	7th	4 × 100 m relay	48.75 s
2017	South American Championships	Asunción, Paraguay	9th	Long jump	5.68 m
2017	South American Championships	Asunción, Paraguay	8th	Triple jump	12.61 m (w)
2017	Bolivarian Games	Santa Marta, Colombia	5th	4 × 100 m relay	47.41 s
2017	Bolivarian Games	Santa Marta, Colombia	6th	Long jump	5.80 m
2017	Bolivarian Games	Santa Marta, Colombia	3rd	Triple jump	13.17 m
2018	South American Games	Cochabamba, Bolivia	6th	Long jump	5.99 m
2018	South American Games	Cochabamba, Bolivia	4th	Triple jump	13.37 m
2018	Ibero-American Championships	Trujillo, Peru	3rd	4 × 100 m relay	47.39 s
2018	Ibero-American Championships	Trujillo, Peru	5th	Long jump	6.03 m (w)
2018	Ibero-American Championships	Trujillo, Peru	5th	Triple jump	13.12 m
2018	South American U23 Championships	Cuenca, Ecuador	4th	Long jump	5.85 m
2018	South American U23 Championships	Cuenca, Ecuador	3rd	Triple jump	12.79 m
2019	South American Championships	Lima, Peru	8th	Long jump	5.76 m
2019	South American Championships	Lima, Peru	6th	Triple jump	12.69 m
2020	South American Indoor Championships	Cochabamba, Bolivia	5th	Long jump	5.84 m
2020	South American Indoor Championships	Cochabamba, Bolivia	2nd	Triple jump	13.12 m
2021	South American Championships	Guayaquil, Ecuador	8th	Long jump	5.60 m
2021	South American Championships	Guayaquil, Ecuador	8th	Triple jump	12.68 m (w)
2022	South American Indoor Championships	Cochabamba, Bolivia	4th	Long jump	6.02 m
2022	South American Indoor Championships	Cochabamba, Bolivia	5th	Triple jump	13.03 m
2022	Ibero-American Championships	La Nucía, Spain	8th	Triple jump	12.82 m
2022	South American Games	Asunción, Paraguay	5th	4 × 100 m relay	47.34 s
2022	South American Games	Asunción, Paraguay	4th	Triple jump	12.89 m
2023	South American Championships	São Paulo, Brazil	5th	4 × 100 m relay	46.89 s
2023	South American Championships	São Paulo, Brazil	6th	Long jump	5.80 m
2023	South American Championships	São Paulo, Brazil	8th	Triple jump	13.07 m
2023	Pan American Games	Santiago, Chile	8th	Triple jump	12.40 m
2024	South American Indoor Championships	Cochabamba, Bolivia	5th	Long jump	5.99 m
2024	South American Indoor Championships	Cochabamba, Bolivia	2nd	Triple jump	12.82 m
2024	Ibero-American Championships	Cuiabá, Brazil	3rd	Triple jump	13.11 m
2025	South American Indoor Championships	Cochabamba, Bolivia	3rd	Triple jump	13.17 m
2025	South American Championships	Mar del Plata, Argentina	8th	Triple jump	12.52 m
2025	Bolivarian Games	Lima, Peru	1st	Triple jump	13.48 m
2026	South American Indoor Championships	Cochabamba, Bolivia	3rd	Triple jump	13.06 m
2026	South American Games	Santa Fe, Argentina	3rd	Triple jump	12.74 m

== Personal bests ==
Outdoor

- Long jump – 6.09 m (-0.3 m/s, Tarija 2017) NR
- Triple jump – 13.50 m (+0.4 m/s, Cochabamba 2024) NR

Indoor

- Long jump – 6.10 m (Cochabamba 2024) NR
- Triple jump – 13.17 m (Cochabamba 2025) NR
