= Anthony Zambrano =

Colombian sprinter (born 1998)

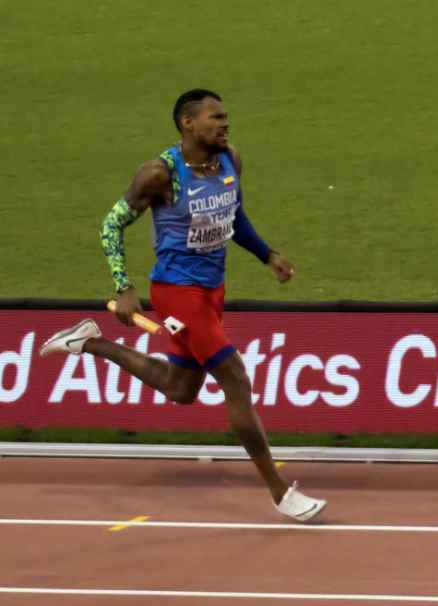
- Zambrano in 2019

Personal information
- Full name: Anthony José Zambrano de la Cruz
- Born: 17 January 1998 (age 28) Maicao, Colombia
- Height: 1.84 m (6 ft 0 in)
- Weight: 72 kg (159 lb)

Sport
- Country: Colombia
- Sport: Athletics
- Events: 200 metres; 400 metres; 4×100 metres; 4×400 metres; Mixed relay
Medal record
Representing Colombia
Men's athletics
Event	1st	2nd	3rd
Olympic Games	0	1	0
World Championships	0	1	0
Pan American Games	2	0	0
Ibero-American Championships	0	0	1
South American Championships	4	0	0
South American U23 Championships	3	0	0
Total	9	2	1
Olympic Games
Silver medal – second place	2020 Tokyo	400 m
World Championships
Silver medal – second place	2019 Doha	400 m
Pan American Games
Gold medal – first place	2019 Lima	400 m
Gold medal – first place	2019 Lima	4×400 m relay
Ibero-American Championships
Bronze medal – third place	2024 Cuiabá	400 m
South American Championships
Gold medal – first place	2019 Lima	400 m
Gold medal – first place	2019 Lima	4×400 m relay
Gold medal – first place	2023 São Paulo	400 m
Gold medal – first place	2023 São Paulo	Mixed relay
South American U23 Championships
Gold medal – first place	2018 Cuenca	400 m
Gold medal – first place	2018 Cuenca	4×100 m relay
Gold medal – first place	2018 Cuenca	4×400 m relay

Anthony José Zambrano de la Cruz (born 17 January 1998) is a Colombian sprinter. He won the silver medal at the 2020 Summer Olympics in the 400 metres, setting the new South American record of 43.93 seconds.

He was also a finalist of the 400 metres in the 2015 World Youth Championships in Athletics held in Cali, Colombia. The following year he was in the final of the 400 metres at the 2016 IAAF World U20 Championships in Bydgoszcz, Poland. He currently holds the national record and national record U23 in the 400 meters at 43.93 sec, which also becomes South American record U23 and the second best historical mark of South America in the 400 meters. He won the 2018 South American Under-23 Championships in Athletics, setting the championship record. In 2019 he won the Pan American Games 400 meters in Lima, Peru.

He has qualified to represent Colombia at the 2020 Summer Olympics where he won the silver medal in the 400 metres with a time of 44.08, finishing behind Steven Gardiner.
