= Elián Larregina =

Argentine sprinter (born 2000)

Personal information
- Full name: Elián Gaspar Larregina
- Born: 20 February 2000 (age 26) Suipacha, Argentina

Sport
- Sport: Athletics
- Event: 400 metres

Elián Gaspar Larregina (born 20 February 2000) is an Argentine sprinter specialising in the 400 metres. He won a bronze medal at the 2022 Ibero-American Championships setting a new national record of 45.78. new records 44.56 in 2025.

== International competitions ==
Year	Competition	Venue	Position	Event	Notes
Representing Argentina
2017	World U18 Championships	Nairobi, Kenya	33rd (h)	400 m	59.05
2018	South American U23 Championships	Cuenca, Ecuador	4th	400 m	46.54
2018	South American U23 Championships	Cuenca, Ecuador	4th	4 × 400 m relay	3:18.23
2019	Pan American U20 Championships	San José, Costa Rica	8th	200 m	21.66
2019	Pan American U20 Championships	San José, Costa Rica	7th	400 m	46.95
2020	South American Indoor Championships	Cochabamba, Bolivia	1st	400 m	47.52
2020	South American Indoor Championships	Cochabamba, Bolivia	2nd	4 × 400 m relay	3:29.45
2021	South American Championships	Guayaquil, Ecuador	7th	400 m	48.06
2022	Ibero-American Championships	La Nucía, Spain	3rd	400 m	45.78
2022	South American U23 Championships	Cascavel, Brazil	1st	400 m	45.53
2022	South American U23 Championships	Cascavel, Brazil	1st	4 × 400 m relay	3:04.39
2022	South American Games	Asunción, Paraguay	1st	400 m	45.80
2023	South American Championships	São Paulo, Brazil	2nd	400 m	45.63
2023	South American Championships	São Paulo, Brazil	3rd	4 × 400 m relay	3:05.76
2023	World Championships	Budapest, Hungary	29th (h)	400 m	45.42
2023	Pan American Games	Santiago, Chile	7th	400 m	50.90
2023	Pan American Games	Santiago, Chile	8th	4 × 400 m relay	3:15.69
2024	South American Indoor Championships	Cochabamba, Bolivia	1st	400 m	46.37
2024	Ibero-American Championships	Cuiabá, Brazil	1st	400 m	45.27
2024	Olympic Games	Paris, France	17th (sf)	400 m	45.02
2025	South American Indoor Championships	Cochabamba, Bolivia	1st	400 m	47.21
2025	South American Indoor Championships	Cochabamba, Bolivia	3rd	4 × 400 m relay	3:23.58
2025	South American Championships	Mar del Plata, Argentina	2nd	400 m	46.17
2025	South American Championships	Mar del Plata, Argentina	2nd	4 × 400 m relay	3:08.77
2025	World Championships	Tokyo, Japan	25th (h)	400 m	44.97
2026	South American Indoor Championships	Cochabamba, Bolivia	3rd	400 m	47.46
2026	World Indoor Championships	Toruń, Poland	14th (sf)	400 m	46.93
2026	Ibero-American Championships	Lima, Peru	2nd	400 m	45.57
2026	Ibero-American Championships	Lima, Peru	5th	4 × 400 m relay	3:08.34
2026	South American Games	Santa Fe, Argentina	2nd (h)	400 m	45.71^{1}
2026	South American Games	Santa Fe, Argentina	2nd	4 × 400 m relay	3:06.29
2026	South American Games	Santa Fe, Argentina	1st	Mixed 4 × 400 m relay	3:16.93

^{1}Disqualified in the final

== Personal bests ==
Outdoor

- 100 metres – 10.80 (+0.8 m/s, San Carlos 2023)
- 200 metres – 21.08 (+2.0 m/s, Mar del Plata 2019)
- 400 metres – 44.67 (Troyes 2025) NR

Indoor

- 400 metres – 46.37 (Cochabamba 2024) NR
