= Leodan Torrealba =

Venezuelan athlete

Personal information
- Full name: Leodan Manuel Torrealba Ramos
- Born: December 26, 1996 (age 29) Guárico, Venezuela
- Height: 1.80 m (5 ft 11 in)
- Weight: 75 kg (165 lb)

Sport
- Sport: Athletics
- Events: Triple jump, long jump

Leodan Manuel Torrealba Ramos (born 26 December 1996) is a Venezuelan athlete specialising in the triple jump. He represented his country at the 2023 World Championships in Budapest finishing tenth in the final.

== International competitions ==
Year	Competition	Venue	Position	Event	Notes
Representing Venezuela
2015	South American Junior Championships	Cuenca, Ecuador	2nd	Triple jump	15.14 m
2018	South American Games	Cochabamba, Bolivia	5th	Long jump	7.76 m
2018	South American Games	Cochabamba, Bolivia	3rd	Triple jump	16.23 m
2018	Central American and Caribbean Games	Barranquilla, Colombia	9th	Triple jump	15.57 m
2019	Pan American Games	Lima, Peru	7th	Triple jump	16.27 m
2020	South American Indoor Championships	Cochabamba, Bolivia	2nd	Long jump	7.72 m
2020	South American Indoor Championships	Cochabamba, Bolivia	5th	Triple jump	15.97 m
2021	South American Championships	Guayaquil, Ecuador	6th	Long jump	7.82 m
2021	South American Championships	Guayaquil, Ecuador	2nd	Triple jump	16.89 m
2022	South American Indoor Championships	Cochabamba, Bolivia	1st	4 × 400 m relay	3:16.91
2022	South American Indoor Championships	Cochabamba, Bolivia	3rd	Triple jump	16.55 m
2022	Ibero-American Championships	La Nucía, Spain	5th	Triple jump	16.42 m
2022	Bolivarian Games	Valledupar, Colombia	1st	Triple jump	16.57 m (w)
2022	South American Games	Asunción, Paraguay	1st	Triple jump	16.31 m
2023	ALBA Games	Caracas, Venezuela	2nd	Long jump	7.72 m
2023	ALBA Games	Caracas, Venezuela	3rd	Triple jump	16.50 m
2023	South American Championships	São Paulo, Brazil	7th	Long jump	7.35 m
2023	South American Championships	São Paulo, Brazil	3rd	Triple jump	16.52 m
2023	World Championships	Budapest, Hungary	10th	Triple jump	16.58 m
2023	Pan American Games	Santiago, Chile	6th	Triple jump	16.20 m
2024	South American Indoor Championships	Cochabamba, Bolivia	1st	Triple jump	16.24 m
2024	Ibero-American Championships	Cuiabá, Brazil	6th	Triple jump	16.21 m
2024	Olympic Games	Paris, France	29th (q)	Triple jump	16.18 m
2025	South American Indoor Championships	Cochabamba, Bolivia	3rd	Triple jump	16.05 m
2025	South American Championships	Mar del Plata, Argentina	–	Long jump	NM
2025	South American Championships	Mar del Plata, Argentina	3rd	Triple jump	16.22 m
2025	World Championships	Tokyo, Japan	25th (q)	Triple jump	16.26 m
2025	Bolivarian Games	Lima, Peru	1st	Triple jump	16.59 m
2026	South American Indoor Championships	Cochabamba, Bolivia	3rd	Triple jump	16.18 m
2026	Pan American Championships	Medellín, Colombia	5th	Triple jump	15.97 m (w)
2026	Central American and Caribbean Games	Santo Domingo, Dominican Republic	7th	Triple jump	15.95 m

== Personal bests ==
=== Outdoor ===
- Long jump – 7.82 (+1.5 m/s, Guayaquil 2021)
- Triple jump – 16.90 (+1.4 m/s, São Paulo 2023) NR

=== Indoor ===
- Long jump – 7.72 (Cochabamba 2020)
- Triple jump – 16.55 (Cochabamba 2022) NR
