= Kelvis Padrino =

Venezuelan sprinter

Personal information
- Full name: Kelvis José Padrino Villazana
- Born: 26 February 1997 (age 29) Pariaguán, Anzoátegui, Venezuela

Sport
- Sport: Athletics
- Event: 400 metres

Kelvis José Padrino Villazana (born 26 February 1997) is a Venezuelan sprinter specialising in the 400 metres. He won a gold medal at the 2021 South American Championships.

== International competitions ==
Year	Competition	Venue	Position	Event	Notes
Representing Venezuela
2013	World Youth Championships	Donetsk, Ukraine	29th (h)	400 m	48.70
2014	South American Youth Championships	Cali, Colombia	6th	400 m	48.89
2017	World Relays	Nassau, Bahamas	11th (h)	4 × 200 m relay	1:25.69
2017	South American Championships	Asunción, Paraguay	5th	400 m	46.67
2017	South American Championships	Asunción, Paraguay	3rd	4 × 400 m relay	3:07.74
2017	Bolivarian Games	Santa Marta, Colombia	4th	400 m	47.00
2017	Bolivarian Games	Santa Marta, Colombia	2nd	4 × 400 m relay	3:06.32
2018	South American Games	Cochabamba, Bolivia	7th	400 m	47.93
2018	Central American and Caribbean Games	Barranquilla, Colombia	16th (h)	400 m	48.07
2018	Central American and Caribbean Games	Barranquilla, Colombia	4th	4 × 400 m relay	3:06.62
2018	South American U23 Championships	Cuenca, Ecuador	5th	400 m	46.96
2019	South American Championships	Lima, Peru	4th	400 m	46.72
2019	Pan American Games	Lima, Peru	14th (h)	400 m	46.99
2019	Pan American Games	Lima, Peru	8th	4 × 400 m relay	3:10.65
2021	South American Championships	Guayaquil, Ecuador	5th	200 m	21.03
2021	South American Championships	Guayaquil, Ecuador	1st	400 m	45.82
2022	Bolivarian Games	Valledupar, Colombia	2nd	400 m	46.96
2022	Bolivarian Games	Valledupar, Colombia	2nd	4 × 400 m relay	3:07.28
2022	South American Games	Asunción, Paraguay	2nd	400 m	46.41
2022	South American Games	Asunción, Paraguay	1st	4 × 400 m relay	3:06.54
2023	ALBA Games	Caracas, Venezuela	4th	200 m	21.23
2023	ALBA Games	Caracas, Venezuela	1st	400 m	45.75
2023	ALBA Games	Caracas, Venezuela	1st	4 × 400 m relay	3:07.89
2023	Central American and Caribbean Games	San Salvador, El Salvador	7th	400 m	45.97
2023	Central American and Caribbean Games	San Salvador, El Salvador	4th	4 × 400 m relay	3:03.00
2023	South American Championships	São Paulo, Brazil	4th	400 m	46.06
2023	South American Championships	São Paulo, Brazil	1st	4 × 400 m relay	3:04.14
2023	Pan American Games	Santiago, Chile	4th	4 × 400 m relay	3:06.04
2024	South American Indoor Championships	Cochabamba, Bolivia	3rd	400 m	47.39
2024	South American Indoor Championships	Cochabamba, Bolivia	1st	4 × 400 m relay	3:11.41
2025	South American Indoor Championships	Cochabamba, Bolivia	2nd	400 m	47.42
2025	South American Indoor Championships	Cochabamba, Bolivia	1st	4 × 400 m relay	3:18.29
2025	South American Championships	Mar del Plata, Argentina	1st	400 m	46.02
2025	South American Championships	Mar del Plata, Argentina	3rd	4 × 400 m relay	3:09.18
2025	Bolivarian Games	Lima, Peru	1st	400 m	45.71
2025	Bolivarian Games	Lima, Peru	1st	4 × 400 m relay	3:04.00
2026	World Indoor Championships	Toruń, Poland	16th (h)	400 m	46.70
2026	World Indoor Championships	Toruń, Poland	8th (h)	4 × 400 m relay	3:07.05
2026	Ibero-American Championships	Lima, Peru	2nd	400 m	45.61
2026	Ibero-American Championships	Lima, Peru	1st	4 × 400 m relay	3:02.88
2026	Central American and Caribbean Games	Santo Domingo, Dominican Republic	11th (h)	400 m	46.13
2026	Central American and Caribbean Games	Santo Domingo, Dominican Republic	3rd	4 × 400 m relay	3:01.64
2026	South American Games	Santa Fe, Argentina	4th	400 m	46.18
2026	South American Games	Santa Fe, Argentina	1st	4 × 400 m relay	3:03.38

== Personal bests ==
Outdoor

- 100 metres – 10.75 seconds (-1.7 m/s, Barquisimeto 2021)
- 200 metres – 21.03 seconds (+1.9 m/s, Guayaquil 2021)
- 400 metres – 45.74 seconds (Barquisimeto 2021)
