= 2025 South American Indoor Championships in Athletics =

4th South American Indoor Championships
- Dates: 22–23 February
- Host city: Cochabamba, Bolivia
- Venue: Estadio de Atletismo del Gobierno Autónomo Municipal de Cochabamba
- Level: Senior
- Events: 25
- Participation: 139 athletes from 12 nations
- Records set: 9 CR

2025 South American Indoor Championships in Athletics was the fourth edition of the biennial indoor athletics competition between South American nations. As for the previous two editions, the event was held in Cochabamba, Bolivia, on 22 and 23 February at the Estadio de Atletismo del Gobierno Autónomo Municipal de Cochabamba.

== Medal summary ==
=== Men ===
Event	Gold		Silver		Bronze	
60 metres	Neiker Abello (COL)	6.60	Felipe Bardi (BRA)	6.64	Franco Florio (ARG)	6.67
400 metres	Elián Larregina (ARG)	47.21	Kelvis Padrino (VEN)	47.42	Javier Gómez (VEN)	47.91
800 metres	Leonardo Santos (BRA)	1:49.94 CR	Marco Vilca (PER)	1:51.01	Guilherme Orenhas (BRA)	1:51.02
1500 metres	Thiago André (BRA)	3:50.09 CR	David Ninavia (BOL)	3:52.48 NR	Yeferson Cuno (PER)	3:59.27
3000 metres	David Ninavia (BOL)	8:30.66	Víctor Aguilar (BOL)	8:37.31	Yeferson Cuno (PER)	8:38.83
60 metres hurdles	Eduardo de Deus (BRA)	7.67	Thiago Ornelas (BRA)	7.67	Francisco Ferreccio (ARG)	7.94
4 × 400 metres relay	Venezuela Javier Gómez; Ryan López; Sebastián López; Kelvis Padrino	3:18.29	Bolivia Marcelo Pérez; Nery Peñaloza; Bladimir Rueda; Ikenna Ibe-Akobi	3:20.71	Argentina Helber Melgarejo; Renzo Cremaschi; Franco Florio; Elián Larregina	3:23.58
High jump	Thiago Moura (BRA)	2.22	Fernando Ferreira (BRA)	2.16	Sebastián Daners (URU)	2.05
Pole vault	Not held	Not held	Not held			
Long jump	Arnovis Dalmero (COL)	7.96	José Luis Mandros (PER)	7.84	Emiliano Lasa (URU)	7.79
Triple jump	Elton Petronilho (BRA)	16.52	Almir dos Santos (BRA)	16.39	Leodan Torrealba (VEN)	16.05
Shot put	Welington Morais (BRA)	20.92	Willian Dourado (BRA)	20.60	Juan Manuel Arrieguez (ARG)	17.32
Heptathlon	José Fernando Ferreira (BRA)	5773	Pedro de Oliveira (BRA)	5668	Gerson Izaguirre (VEN)	5060
WR world record | AR area record | CR championship record | GR games record | NR national record | OR Olympic record | PB personal best | SB season best | WL world leading (in a given season)

=== Women ===
Event	Gold		Silver		Bronze	
60 metres	Ana Carolina Azevedo (BRA)	7.16 CR	Marlet Ospino (COL)	7.22 =NR	Anaís Hernández (CHI)	7.31
400 metres	María Florencia Lamboglia (ARG)	55.35	Ibeyis Romero (VEN)	56.44	Lucía Sotomayor (BOL)	56.95
800 metres	Jaqueline Weber (BRA)	2:10.46	María Rojas (VEN)	2:11.65	Cecilia Gómez (BOL)	2:13.61
1500 metres	Anita Poma (PER)	4:23.74 CR	Benita Parra (BOL)	4:30.18	July da Silva (BRA)	4:37.14
3000 metres	Benita Parra (BOL)	9:43.90 CR	Micaela Rivera Wood (PER)	10:00.12	Gabriela Mamani (BOL)	11:00.21
60 metres hurdles	Ketiley Batista (BRA)	8.11	Helen Bernard Stilling (ARG)	8.29	Génesis Romero (VEN)	8.30
4 × 400 metres relay	Bolivia Lucía Sotomayor; Mariana Arce; Nayana Aramayo; Cecilia Gómez	3:56.34	Argentina Helen Bernard Stilling; Marlene Koss; Victoria Zanolli; Belén Fritzsche	4:08.20	Only two participating teams	
High jump	Arielly Monteiro (BRA)	1.82	Lorena Aires (URU)	1.73	Valdiléia Martins (BRA)	1.70
Pole vault	Beatriz Chagas (BRA)	4.25 CR	Isabel de Quadros (BRA)	4.20	Carolina Scarponi (ARG)	4.05
Long jump	Natalia Linares (COL)	6.64 CR, NR	Nathalee Aranda (PAN)	6.42	Eliane Martins (BRA)	6.24
Triple jump	Regiclecia Candido (BRA)	14.17 CR	Gabriele dos Santos (BRA)	13.47	Valeria Quispe (BOL)	13.17
Shot put	Ivana Gallardo (CHI)	17.63	Ana Caroline Silva (BRA)	16.65	Lívia Avancini (BRA)	15.92
Pentathlon	Tamara de Sousa (BRA)	4294 pts CR	Roberta dos Santos (BRA)	4253 pts	Ana Paula Argüello (PAR)	3395 pts
WR world record | AR area record | CR championship record | GR games record | NR national record | OR Olympic record | PB personal best | SB season best | WL world leading (in a given season)

== Medal table ==
The host country is highlighted in lavender blue

Rank	Nation	Gold	Silver	Bronze	Total
1	Brazil	14	10	5	29
2	Bolivia*	3	4	4	11
3	Colombia	3	1	0	4
4	Argentina	2	2	5	9
5	Venezuela	1	3	4	8
6	Peru	1	3	2	6
7	Chile	1	0	1	2
8	Uruguay	0	1	2	3
9	Panama	0	1	0	1
10	Paraguay	0	0	1	1
Totals (10 entries)		25	25	24	74

== Participation ==
Twelve member federations participated in the championships.

- Argentina (15)
- Bolivia (27)
- Brazil (34)
- Chile (4)
- Colombia (9)
- Ecuador (2)
- Panama (3)
- Paraguay (9)
- Peru (9)
- Suriname (1)
- Uruguay (11)
- Venezuela (14)
