= Marcos Herrera =

Ecuadorian athlete (born 1999)

Personal information
- Full name: Marcos Morley Herrera Pineda
- Born: 30 June 1999 (age 27)

Sport
- Sport: Athletics
- Event: Hurdles

Achievements and titles
- Personal bests: 60 m hurdles: 7.57 (Cochabamba, 2026) AR; 110 m hurdles: 13.39 NR (Montreuil 2026)
Medal record
Representing Ecuador
Men's athletics
Pan American Championships
Gold medal – first place	2026 Medellín	110 m hurdles
Ibero-American Championships
Gold medal – first place	2026 Lima	110 m hurdles
South American Championships
Bronze medal – third place	2021 Guayaquil	110 m hurdles
Bronze medal – third place	2025 Mar del Plata	110 m hurdles
South American Indoor Championships
Gold medal – first place	2026 Cochabamba	60 m hurdles
Bolivarian Games
Gold medal – first place	2025 Lima-Ayacucho	110 m hurdles
Junior Pan American Games
Gold medal – first place	2021 Cali-Valle	110 m hurdles
South American U23 Championships
Gold medal – first place	2021 Guayaquil	110 m hurdles

Marcos Morley Herrera Pineda (born 30 June 1999) is an Ecuadorian sprint hurdler. He won the 60 metres hurdles in 7.57 seconds to set a new South American indoor record at the 2026 South American Indoor Championships.

== Biography ==
From Machala, but later based in Guayaquil, Herrera won the gold medal at the 2016 South American Youth Championships and set a championships record to win the 110 metres hurdles with also a national U20 record of 13.58 seconds (-1.9m/s) at the 2017 South American Junior Championships in Georgetown, Guyana.

Herrera won the bronze medal in the 110 metres hurdles at the 2021 South American Championships in Guayaquil, Ecuador. He was the gold medalist at the 2021 South American U23 Championships in Guayaquil, running 14.10 seconds. Later that year, he also won the gold medal at the Junior Pan American Games in Cali, Colombia, in 13.94 seconds.

In March 2023, he won the 110 metres hurdles at the Ecuadorian Sprint, Hurdles and Relay Championships, in Quito. The race happened to be on his mother's birthday and she was given the honour of awarding him his gold medal on the podium after the race. Herrera was a finalist in the 110 metres hurdles at the 2023 Pan American Games in Santiago, Chile, placing seventh overall.

Herrera won the bronze medal in the 110 metres hurdles at the 2025 South American Championships in Mar del Plata, Argentina.

Herrera won the 60m hurdles in 7.57 to set a new South American indoor record at the 2026 South American Indoor Championships, in Bolivia. In March 2026, he was a semi-finalist over 60 metres hurdles at the 2026 World Athletics Indoor Championships. In May, he ran a new national record of 13.43 second to win the 110 metres hurdles at the 2026 Ibero-American Championships in Athletics in Peru.
