= 2026 South American Indoor Championships in Athletics =

4th South American Indoor Championships
- Dates: 28 February – 1 March
- Host city: Cochabamba, Bolivia
- Venue: Estadio de Atletismo del Gobierno Autónomo Municipal de Cochabamba
- Level: Senior
- Events: 26
- Participation: 146 athletes from 12 nations

2026 South American Indoor Championships in Athletics was the fifth edition of the biennial indoor athletics competition between South American nations. As for the previous two editions, the event was held in Cochabamba, Bolivia, on 30 February and 1 March at the Estadio de Atletismo del Gobierno Autónomo Municipal de Cochabamba.

== Medal summary ==
=== Men ===
Event	Gold		Silver		Bronze	
60 metres	Gabriel dos Santos (BRA)	6.56 CR	Bryant Álamo (VEN)	6.59	Erik Cardoso (BRA)	6.62
400 metres	Matheus Lima (BRA)	45.85	Tiago Lemes (BRA)	47.02	Elián Larregina (ARG)	47.46
800 metres	Eduardo Moreira (BRA)	1:47.58 CR	Guilherme Orenhas (BRA)	1:47.94	Marco Vilca (PER)	1:49.95
1500 metres	Yeferson Cuno (PER)	3:50.75	David Ninavia (BOL)	3:51.20 NR	Dylan Carrasco (COL)	3:54.06 NR
3000 metres	Luis Huaman (PER)	8:33.32	Yeferson Cuno (PER)	8:33.33	Dylan Carrasco (COL)	8:34.05
60 metres hurdles	Marcos Herrera (ECU)	7.57 CR, AR	Rafael Pereira (BRA)	7.62	Eduardo de Deus (BRA)	7.67
4 × 400 metres relay	Colombia Adrián Mendoza; Cristian Ortega; Neiker Abello; Manuel Henao	3:16.92 NR	Argentina Tomás Villegas; Francisco Ferreccio; Lorenzo Rossetto; Manuel Juárez	3:20.75 NR	Bolivia Nery Peñaloza; Leandro Daza; Josué Nieves; Ikenna Ibe-Akobi	3:22.60
High jump	Thiago Moura (BRA)	2.23	Fernando Ferreira (BRA)	2.20	Nicolás Numair (CHI)	2.20
Pole vault	Lucas Vicente (BRA)	5.35	Augusto Dutra de Oliveira (BRA)	5.30	Only two starters	
Long jump	Alexsandro Melo (BRA)	7.89	Arnovis Dalmero (COL)	7.88	Lucas dos Santos (BRA)	7.80
Triple jump	Elton Petronilho (BRA)	17.05	Almir dos Santos (BRA)	16.43	Leodan Torrealba (VEN)	16.18
Shot put	Welington Morais (BRA)	20.76	Willian Dourado (BRA)	20.25	Juan Manuel Arrieguez (ARG)	18.05
Heptathlon	José Fernando Ferreira (BRA)	5696	Pedro de Oliveira (BRA)	5668	Andy Preciado (ECU)	5297
WR world record | AR area record | CR championship record | GR games record | NR national record | OR Olympic record | PB personal best | SB season best | WL world leading (in a given season)

=== Women ===
Event	Gold		Silver		Bronze	
60 metres	Ana Carolina Azevedo (BRA)	7.09 CR	Gabriela Mourão (BRA)	7.23	Glanyernis Guerra (VEN)	7.24
400 metres	María Florencia Lamboglia (ARG)	53.73	Anny De Bassi (BRA)	53.96	Melany Bolaño (COL)	54.34
800 metres	Mayara Leite (BRA)	2:17.75	Liliane Mariano (BRA)	2:18.09	Cecilia Gómez (BOL)	2:20.83
1500 metres	Benita Parra (BOL)	4:30.18	Gabriela Mamani (BOL)	4:50.65	Antonella Bonomi (URU)	5:03.41
3000 metres	Benita Parra (BOL)	10:11.76	Gabriela Mamani (BOL)	10:36.07	Antonella Bonomi (URU)	11:04.53
60 metres hurdles	María Fernanda Murillo (COL)	8.01 CR, NR	Maribel Caicedo (ECU)	8.10	Vitoria Alves (BRA)	8.14
4 × 400 metres relay	Bolivia Cecilia Gómez; Mariana Arce; Nayana Aramayo; Lucía Sotomayor	3:58.50	Uruguay Valentina González; Sofía Ingold; Millie Díaz; Antonella Bonomi	4:24.21	Not awarded	
High jump	Maria Eduarda de Oliveira (BRA)	1.79	Lorena Aires (URU)	1.73	Roberta dos Santos (BRA)	1.73
Pole vault	Ayla Sakamoto (BRA)	4.10	Beatriz Chagas (BRA)	4.00	Carolina Scarponi (ARG)	3.90
Long jump	Natalia Linares (COL)	6.73 CR, NR	Martha Araújo (COL)	6.71	Leticia Oro Melo (BRA)	6.55
Triple jump	Gabriele dos Santos (BRA)	13.84	Regiclecia Candido (BRA)	13.79	Valeria Quispe (BOL)	13.06
Shot put	Ivana Gallardo (CHI)	18.02 CR	Ana Caroline Silva (BRA)	17.42	Mariela Pérez (CHI)	16.23
Pentathlon	Roberta dos Santos (BRA)	4117 pts CR	Mariam Buenanueva (ARG)	3860 pts	Tamara de Sousa (BRA)	3785 pts
WR world record | AR area record | CR championship record | GR games record | NR national record | OR Olympic record | PB personal best | SB season best | WL world leading (in a given season)

== Medal table ==
The host country is highlighted in lavender blue

Rank	Nation	Gold	Silver	Bronze	Total
1	Brazil	15	14	7	36
2	Bolivia*	3	3	3	9
3	Colombia	3	2	3	8
4	Peru	2	1	1	4
5	Argentina	1	2	3	6
6	Ecuador	1	1	1	3
7	Chile	1	0	2	3
8	Uruguay	0	2	2	4
9	Venezuela	0	1	2	3
Totals (9 entries)		26	26	24	76

== Participation ==
- Argentina (14)
- Bolivia (30)
- Brazil (38)
- Chile (8)
- Colombia (14)
- Ecuador (3)
- Panama (6)
- Paraguay (3)
- Peru (7)
- Puerto Rico (3) (guest)
- Uruguay (13)
- Venezuela (7)
