= 2018 South American Under-23 Championships in Athletics =

VIII South American Under-23 Championships in Athletics
- Dates: 29–30 September
- Host city: Cuenca, Ecuador
- Venue: Pista de Atletismo Jefferson Pérez
- Level: Under-23
- Events: 44
- Participation: 233 athletes from 11 nations
- Records set: 12 CRs

The 2018 South American Under-23 Championships in Athletics was the eighth edition of the biennial track and field competition for South American athletes aged under 23 years old, organised by CONSUDATLE.

== Medal summary ==
=== Men ===
Event	Gold		Silver		Bronze	
100 metres (wind: +0.3 m/s)	Derick Silva (BRA)	10.17 CR	Otilio Rosa (ARG)	10.50	Ignacio Nordetti (CHI)	10.60
200 metres (wind: 0.0 m/s)	Otilio Rosa (ARG)	21.06	Carlos Perlaza (ECU)	21.13	Enzo Faulbaum (CHI)	21.20
400 metres	Anthony Zambrano (COL)	45.19 CR	Alison dos Santos (BRA)	45.97	Bruno Benedito Da Silva (BRA)	46.23
800 metres	Matheus Pessoa (BRA)	1:49.67	Marco Vilca (PER)	1:50.52	Rafael Muñoz (CHI)	1:51.10
1500 metres	Carlos Hernández (COL)	3:59.47	Cleber Cisneros (PER)	4:00.66	Diego Uribe (CHI)	4:01.21
5000 metres	Yuri Labra (PER)	14:57.61	Vidal Basco (BOL)	14:59.49	Paul Ramírez (PER)	14:59.85
10,000 metres	Vidal Basco (BOL)	31:14.72	Yuri Labra (PER)	31:56.16	Juan Carlos Huiza (BOL)	31:59.52
110 metres hurdles (wind: +1.2 m/s)	Rafael Henrique Pereira (BRA)	13.76	Fanor Escobar (COL)	14.02	Juan Pablo Germain (CHI)	14.12
400 metres hurdles	Alison dos Santos (BRA)	50.56	Mikael Antonio de Jesus (BRA)	51.13	Ian Corozo (ECU)	51.92
3000 metres steeplechase	Diego Arevalo (ECU)	9:24.61	Yessy Apaza (BOL)	9:27.50	Yonathan Ichiparra (PER)	9:35.66
4 × 100 m relay	Colombia (COL); Fanor Escobar; Anthony Zambrano; Luis Arizala; Jhonny Rentería	40.08	Chile (CHI); Ignacio Nordetti; Enzo Faulbaum; Andrés Steuer; Juan Pablo Germain	40.60	Ecuador (ECU); Steven Charcopa; Carlos Perlaza; Anderson Marquinez; Steeven Salas	41.09
4 × 400 m relay	Colombia (COL); Luis Arizala; Nicolás Salinas; Kevin Mina; Anthony Zambrano	3:09.77	Brazil (BRA); Rafael Henrique Pereira; Matheus Pessoa; Alison Santos; Bruno Benedito da Silva	3:09.90	Ecuador (ECU); Damian Carcelen; Kenny León; Carlos Perlaza; David Cetre	3:13.17
20,000 m walk	César Rodríguez (PER)	1:24:51.85	Jhonatan Amores (ECU)	1:25:12.25	Paolo Yurivilca (PER)	1:25:44.23
High jump	Jorge Luís da Graça (BRA)	2.10 m	Andy Preciado (ECU)	2.05 m	Claudio da Silva (BRA)	2.05 m
Pole vault	Bruno Spinelli (BRA)	5.20 m	Pablo Chaverra (COL)	5.20 m	Dyander Pacho (ECU)	5.10 m
Long jump	Samory Fraga (BRA)	7.42 m	Fabrizio Mautino (PER)	7.26 m	Brian López (ARG)	7.25 m (w)
Triple jump	Ulisses Costa (BRA)	15.87 m	Geiner Moreno (COL)	15.76 m	Frixon Chila (ECU)	15.69 m
Shot put	Welington Morais (BRA)	19.85 m	José Miguel Ballivián (CHI)	16.40 m	Saymon Hoffmann (BRA)	16.39 m
Discus throw	Cleverson Oliveira (BRA)	52.80 m	Wellinton da Cruz (BRA)	52.29 m	José Miguel Ballivián (CHI)	52.11 m
Hammer throw	Humberto Mansilla (CHI)	76.87 m CR, NR	Joaquín Gómez (ARG)	75.96 m	Gabriel Kehr (CHI)	74.31 m
Javelin throw	Francisco Muse (CHI)	76.91 m	Pedro Luiz Barros (BRA)	76.32 m	Pedro Henrique Rodrigues (BRA)	71.57 m
Decathlon	Sergio Pandiani (ARG)	7119 pts	César Jofre (CHI)	6873 pts	Luiz Henrique Santos (BRA)	6772 pts

=== Women ===
Event	Gold		Silver		Bronze	
100 metres (wind: +1.0 m/s)	Ángela Tenorio (ECU)	11.09 CR	Vitória Cristina Rosa (BRA)	11.17	Anahí Suárez (ECU)	11.50
200 metres (wind: -0.1 m/s)	Vitória Cristina Rosa (BRA)	23.04 CR	Anahí Suárez (ECU)	23.44	Evelyn Rivera (COL)	23.69
400 metres	Martina Weil (CHI)	52.60	Tiffani Marinho (BRA)	52.95	Eliana Chávez (COL)	53.11
800 metres	Johana Arrieta (COL)	2:09.65	Martina Escudero (ARG)	2:13.42	Carolina Lozano (ARG)	2:15.38
1500 metres	Micaela Levaggi (ARG)	4:31.60	Katherine Tisalema (ECU)	4:31.88	Saida Meneses (PER)	4:33.53
5000 metres	Saida Meneses (PER)	17:20.54	Sheyla Eulogio (PER)	17:58.99	Lizbeth Vicuna (ECU)	18:10.46
10,000 metres	Thalia Valdivia (PER)	36:58.03	Sheyla Eulogio (PER)	38:18.86	María Fernanda Montoya (COL)	38:25.89
100 metres hurdles (wind: -1.4 m/s)	Micaela de Mello (BRA)	13.31 CR	Maribel Caicedo (ECU)	13.54	Triana Alonso (PER)	14.09
400 metres hurdles	Fiorella Chiappe (ARG)	56.25 CR	Chayenne da Silva (BRA)	59.21	Marlene dos Santos (BRA)	59.52
3000 metres steeplechase	Katherine Tisalema (ECU)	10:45.80	Rina Cjuro (PER)	10:47.25	Erika Pilicita (ECU)	11:18.41
4 × 100 m relay	Ecuador (ECU); Katherine Chillambo; Ángela Tenorio; Marina Poroso; Anahí Suárez	44.18 CR	Chile (CHI); Poulette Cardoch; Martina Weil; María Ignacia Montt; Javiera Cañas	45.55	Colombia (COL); Shelsy Romero; Damaris Palomeque; Eliana Chávez; Evelyn Rivera	45.57
4 × 400 m relay	Colombia (COL); Lina Licona; Johana Arrieta; Damaris Palomeque; Eliana Chávez	3:35.50 CR	Brazil (BRA); Marlene dos Santos; Micaela de Mello; Chayenne da Silva; Tiffani Marinho	3:42.38	Ecuador (ECU); Andreina Minda; Coraima Cortez; Marina Poroso; Virginia Villalba	3:43.91
20,000 m walk	Leyde Guerra (PER)	1:32:12.42 CR	Karla Jaramillo (ECU)	1:35:43.03	Mishell Semblantes (ECU)	1:43:33.89
High jump	María Fernanda Murillo (COL)	1.80 m	Victoria Rozas (CHI)	1.73 m	Kenia Briones (ECU)	1.70 m
Pole vault	Juliana Campos (BRA)	4.40 m CR	Katherine Castillo (COL)	4.20 m	Nicole Hein (PER)	4.00 m
Long jump	Aries Sánchez (VEN)	6.42 m CR	Mirieli Santos (BRA)	6.049 m	Leticia Oro Melo (BRA)	5.94 m
Triple jump	Mirieli Santos (BRA)	13.34 m	Adriana Chila (ECU)	13.06 m (w)	Valeria Quispe (BOL)	12.79 m
Shot put	Amanda Scherer (BRA)	15.68 m	Ailén Armada (ARG)	15.58 m	Yerlin Mesa (COL)	14.96 m
Discus throw	Ailén Armada (ARG)	54.40 m	Valquiria Meurer (BRA)	52.04 m	Yerlin Mesa (COL)	48.50 m
Hammer throw	Mayra Gaviria (COL)	62.10 m	Ximena Zorrilla (PER)	61.84 m	Mariana García (CHI)	61.59 m
Javelin throw	Laura Paredes (PAR)	55.59 m	Juleisy Angulo (ECU)	54.95 m	Merly Palacios (COL)	52.98 m
Heptathlon	Martha Araújo (COL)	5818 pts	Jenifer Nicole Norberto (BRA)	5290 pts	Keiverlyn González (VEN)	4905 pts

== Medal table ==
Rank	Nation	Gold	Silver	Bronze	Total
1	Brazil (BRA)	15	12	7	34
2	Colombia (COL)	9	4	7	20
3	Peru (PER)	5	8	6	19
4	Argentina (ARG)	5	4	2	11
5	Ecuador (ECU)	4	9	11	24
6	Chile (CHI)	3	5	8	16
7	Bolivia (BOL)	1	2	2	5
8	Venezuela (VEN)	1	0	1	2
9	Paraguay (PAR)	1	0	0	1
Totals (9 entries)		44	44	44	132

== Participation ==
- Argentina (21)
- Bolivia (7)
- Brazil (42)
- Chile (28)
- Colombia (28)
- Ecuador (57)
- Guyana (3)
- Paraguay (8)
- Peru (26)
- Uruguay (2)
- Venezuela (11)
