= Thalia Valdivia =

Peruvian olympic athlete

Thalia Valdivia (born 27 April 1996) is a Peruvian olympic athlete who specializes in long-distance running.

== Career ==
In the 10000m, Thalia is positioned 107 in the world. Her highest ranking in the Marathon in 169 and her highest ranking in the 5000m is 415.

== Personal bests ==
Results
Venue	Event	Time	Date
Boston, USA	Half Marathon	1:14:45	12 November 2023
Rotterdam, Netherlands	Marathon	2:25:23	14 April 2024
Lima, Peru	10,000m	32:42.22	8 September 2023
COTP Stadium, Sao Paulo, Brazil	5000m	16:12.45	30 July 2023
Estadio Atletico de la VIDENA, Lima	3000m	9:34.29	5 March 2022
Lima, Peru	1500m	4:42.69	4 May 2019
