= Athletics at the 2023 Pan American Games – Men's 4 × 100 metres relay =

Men's 4 × 100 metres relay at the 2023 Pan American Games
- Venue: Julio Martínez National Stadium
- Dates: November 2
- Competitors: 44 from 11 nations
- Winning time: 38.68

Medalists
Gold medal	Rodrigo do Nascimento; Felipe Bardi; Erik Cardoso; Renan Gallina	Brazil
Silver medal	Reynaldo Espinosa; Edel Amores; Yaniel Carrero; Shainer Reginfo	Cuba
Bronze medal	Tomás Mondino; Bautista Diamante; Juan Ciampitti; Franco Florio	Argentina

The men's 4 × 100 metres relay competition of the athletics events at the 2023 Pan American Games took place on November 2 at the Julio Martínez National Stadium of Santiago, Chile.

== Records ==
Prior to this competition, the existing world and Pan American Games records were as follows:

World record	Jamaica	36.84	London, United Kingdom	August 11, 2012
Pan American Games record	Antigua and Barbuda	38.14	Toronto, Canada	July 24, 2015

== Schedule ==
Date	Time	Round
November 2, 2023	18:25	Semifinal
November 2, 2023	21:03	Final

== Results ==
=== Semifinals ===
The results were as follows

==== Heat 1 ====
Rank	Lane	Nation	Name	Time	Notes
1	4	United States	Demarius Smith; Christopher Royster; Ilias Garcia; Terrance Laird	38.89	Q
2	6	Cuba	Reynaldo Espinosa; Edel Amores; Yaniel Carrero; Shainer Reginfo	38.92	Q, SB
3	7	Trinidad and Tobago	Jerod Elcock; Judah Taylor; Eric Harrison Jr. Kyle Greaux	39.53	Q
4	3	Paraguay	Gustavo Mongelos; Misael Zalazar; Jonathan Wolk; César Almirón	39.71	
–	5	Dominican Republic	Christopher Valdez; Yancarlos Martínez; Melbin Marcelino; Franquelo Pérez	DNF	

==== Heat 2 ====
Rank	Lane	Nation	Name	Time	Notes
1	3	Brazil	Rodrigo do Nascimento; Felipe Bardi; Erik Cardoso; Renan Gallina	38.84	Q
2	7	Argentina	Tomás Mondino; Bautista Diamante; Juan Ciampitti; Franco Florio	39.53	Q, SB
3	5	Jamaica	Odaine McPherson; Jevaughn Whyte; Andrae Dacres; Michael Sharp	39.55	Q
4	6	Venezuela	David Vivas; Rafael Vásquez; Alexis Nieves; Bryant Alamo	39.65	q
5	8	Saint Kitts and Nevis	Hakeem Huggins; Nadale Buntin; Warren Hazel; Royden Peets	39.93	SB
–	4	Colombia	Jhonny Rentería; Carlos Palacios; Arnovis Dalmero; Ronal Longa	DNS	

=== Final ===
The results were as follows

Rank	Lane	Nation	Name	Time	Notes
1st place, gold medalist(s)	7	Brazil	Rodrigo do Nascimento; Felipe Bardi; Erik Cardoso; Renan Gallina	38.68	
2nd place, silver medalist(s)	5	Cuba	Reynaldo Espinosa; Edel Amores; Yaniel Carrero; Shainer Reginfo	39.26	
3rd place, bronze medalist(s)	4	Argentina	Tomás Mondino; Bautista Diamante; Juan Ciampitti; Franco Florio	39.48	SB
4	8	Trinidad and Tobago	Jerod Elcock; Judah Taylor; Eric Harrison Jr. Kyle Greaux	39.54	
5	1	Paraguay	Gustavo Mongelos; Misael Zalazar; Jonathan Wolk; César Almirón	39.71	
6	3	Jamaica	Odaine McPherson; Jevaughn Whyte; Andrae Dacres; Michael Sharp	39.81 (.802)	
7	2	Venezuela	David Vivas; Rafael Vásquez; Alexis Nieves; Bryant Alamo	39.81 (.804)	
–	6	United States	Demarius Smith; Christopher Royster; Ilias Garcia; Terrance Laird	DNS	
