= List of South American Games records in athletics =

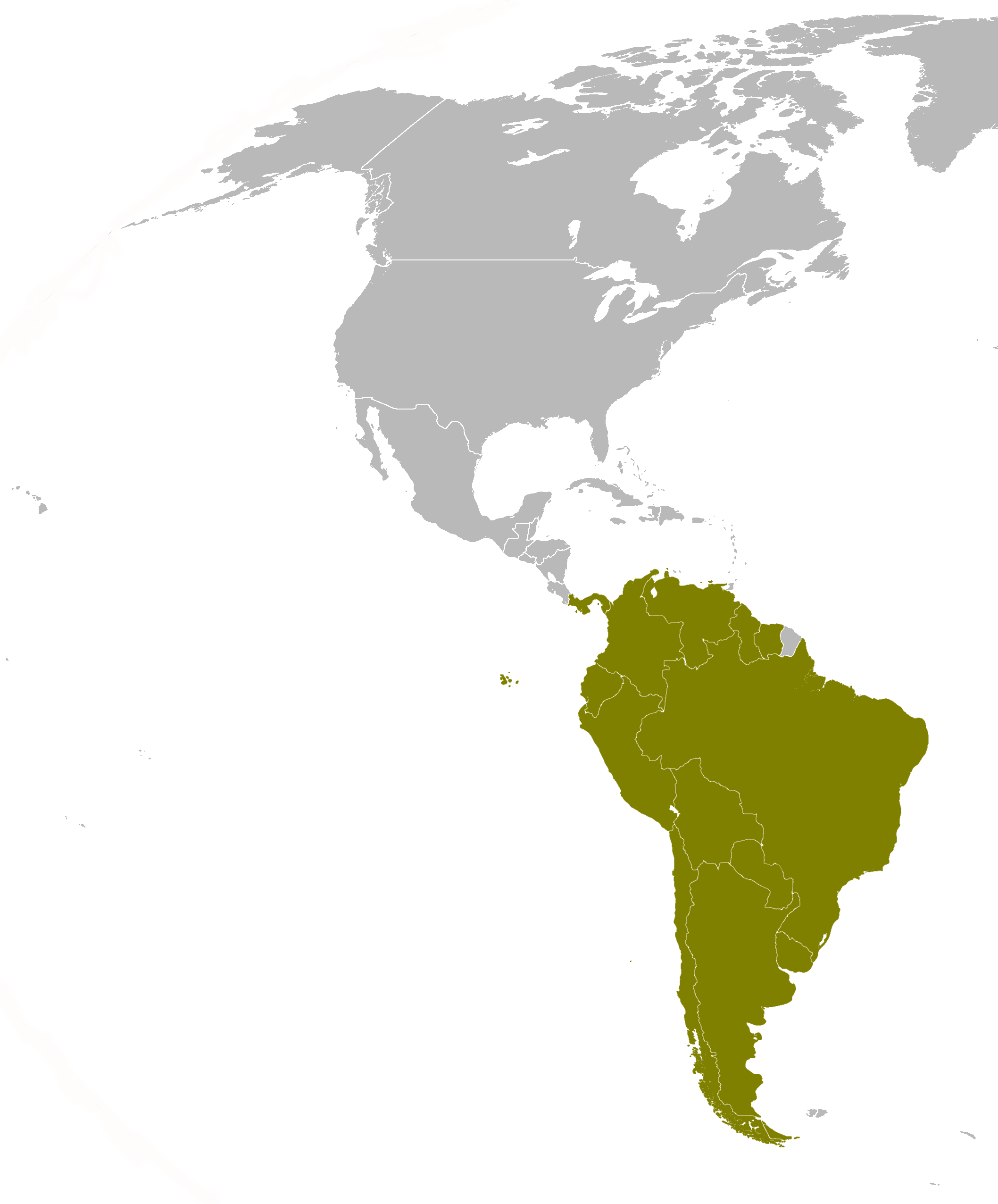
South American Games records in athletics are set by athletes competing from a range of member nations of the Organización Deportiva Suramericana commonly known as ODESUR.

The South American Games is a quadrennial event which began in 1978. The Games records in athletics are set by athletes who are representing one of the ODESUR's member federations. The following list of records is assembled from different sources. There is no information on wind and/or heats for early competitions.

== Men's records ==
| Event | Record | Athlete | Nationality | Date | Meet | Ref. |
|---|---|---|---|---|---|---|
| 100 m | 10.01 (−0.7 m/s) A | Alonso Edward | Panama | 6 June 2018 | 2018 Cochabamba | |
| 200 m | 19.93 (−0.5 m/s) A | Álex Quiñónez | Ecuador | 7 June 2018 | 2018 Cochabamba | |
| 400 m | 44.61 | Alison dos Santos | Brazil | 23 September 2026 | 2026 Santa Fe | |
| 800 m | 1:45.30 | Kléberson Davide | Brazil | 16 March 2014 | 2014 Santiago | |
| 1500 m | 3:39.96 | Federico Bruno | Argentina | 14 March 2014 | 2014 Santiago | |
| 5000 m | 13:26.53 | Valentín Soca | Uruguay | 24 September 2026 | 2026 Santa Fe | |
| 10,000 m | 28:16.79 | Santiago Catrofe | Uruguay | 22 September 2026 | 2026 Santa Fe | |
| Marathon | 2:16:34 | Christian Vascónez | Ecuador | 15 October 2022 | 2022 Asunción | |
| 110 m hurdles | 13.44 (+0.5 m/s) A | Eduardo de Deus | Brazil | 6 June 2018 | 2018 Cochabamba | |
| 400 m hurdles | 48.58 | Matheus Lima | Brazil | 24 September 2026 | 2026 Santa Fe | |
| 3000 m steeplechase | 8:31.89 | Diddier Rodríguez | Panama | 25 September 2026 | 2026 Santa Fe | |
| High jump | 2.28 m A | Eure Yáñez | Venezuela | 6 June 2018 | 2018 Cochabamba | |
| Pole vault | 5.65 m | Germán Chiaraviglio | Argentina | November 2006 | 2006 Buenos Aires | |
| Long jump | 8.26 m (+0.7 m/s) A | Emiliano Lasa | Uruguay | 5 June 2018 | 2018 Cochabamba | |
| Triple jump | 16.84 m (+0.6 m/s) | Elton Petronilho | Brazil | 25 September 2026 | 2026 Santa Fe | |
| Shot put | 21.21 m A | Darlan Romani | Brazil | 7 June 2018 | 2018 Cochabamba | |
| Discus throw | 65.33 m | Claudio Romero | Chile | 22 September 2026 | 2026 Santa Fe | |
| Hammer throw | 76.81 m | Gabriel Kehr | Chile | 12 October 2022 | 2022 Asunción | |
| Javelin throw | 84.36 m | Lars Flaming | Paraguay | 22 September 2026 | 2026 Santa Fe | |
| Decathlon | 7977 pts A | Geormi Jaramillo | Venezuela | 5–6 June 2018 | 2018 Cochabamba | |
| Decathlon | 100m (wind) / Long jump (wind) / Shot put / High jump / 400m / 110m H (wind) / Discus / Pole vault / Javelin / 1500m; 10.66 (+0.5 m/s) / 7.71 m (+0.9 m/s) / 14.75 m / 1.89 m / 47.92 / 13.95 (−1.0 m/s) / 44.45 m / 4.50 m / 57.57 m / 5:17.65 | | | | | |
| 20,000 m walk (track) | 1:22:11.1 h | Éider Arévalo | Colombia | 15 March 2014 | 2014 Santiago | |
| 20 km walk (road) | 1:19:43 | Brian Pintado | Ecuador | 12 October 2022 | 2022 Asunción | |
| Half marathon race walk (road) | 1:22.31 | Caio Bonfim | Brazil | 23 September 2026 | 2026 Santa Fe | |
| 35 km walk (road) | 2:34:17 | Caio Bonfim | Brazil | 14 October 2022 | 2022 Asunción | |
| 4 × 100 m relay | 38.90 | Ailson da Silva Feitosa; Jefferson Lucindo; Aldemir da Silva Junior; Bruno Lins Tenório de Barros | Brazil | 15 March 2014 | 2014 Santiago | |
| 4 × 400 m relay | 3:03.38 | Kelvis Padrino; José Antonio Maita; Axel Gómez; Javier Gómez | Venezuela | 25 September 2026 | 2026 Santa Fe | |

== Women's records ==
| Event | Record | Athlete | Nationality | Date | Meet | Ref. |
|---|---|---|---|---|---|---|
| 100 m | 11.01 (heat) (−1.5 m/s) A | Ángela Tenorio | Ecuador | 6 June 2018 | 2018 Cochabamba | |
| 200 m | 22.63 (+0.2 m/s) | Orangys Jiménez | Venezuela | 24 September 2026 | 2026 Santa Fe | |
| 400 m | 50.45 | Martina Weil | Panama | 23 September 2026 | 2026 Santa Fe | |
| 800 m | 2:01.99 | Luciana Mendes | Brazil | November 1994 | 1994 Valencia | |
| 1500 m | 4:14.69 | Fedra Luna | Argentina | 13 October 2022 | 2022 Asunción | |
| 5000 m | 15:41.78 | Fedra Luna | Argentina | 14 October 2022 | 2022 Asunción | |
| 10,000 m | 33:10.06 | Ines Melchor | Peru | 13 March 2014 | 2014 Santiago | |
| Marathon | 2:34:25 | Rosa Chacha | Ecuador | 15 October 2022 | 2022 Asunción | |
| 100 m hurdles | 13.05 (−0.5 m/s) | Vitória Sena | Brazil | 23 September 2026 | 2026 Santa Fe | |
| 400 m hurdles | 54.11 | Gianna Woodruff | Panama | 24 September 2026 | 2026 Santa Fe | |
| 3000 m steeplechase | 9:35.44 | Belén Casetta | Argentina | 25 September 2026 | 2026 Santa Fe | |
| High jump | 1.90 m A | María Fernanda Murillo | Colombia | 5 June 2018 | 2018 Cochabamba | |
| Pole vault | 4.70 m A | Robeilys Peinado | Venezuela | 7 June 2018 | 2018 Cochabamba | |
| Long jump | 6.66 m (+1.5 m/s) A | Eliane Martins | Brazil | 6 June 2018 | 2018 Cochabamba | |
| Triple jump | 14.59 m (+0.2 m/s) A | Núbia Soares | Brazil | 7 June 2018 | 2018 Cochabamba | |
| Shot put | 18.15 m A | Natalia Duco | Chile | 7 June 2018 | 2018 Cochabamba | |
| Discus throw | 60.86 m | Izabela da Silva | Brazil | 14 October 2022 | 2022 Asunción | |
| Hammer throw | 70.98 m A | Jennifer Dahlgren | Argentina | 5 June 2018 | 2018 Cochabamba | |
| Javelin throw | 62.97 m | Flor Ruiz | Colombia | 13 October 2022 | 2022 Asunción | |
| Heptathlon | 6112 pts | Martha Araújo | Colombia | 14–15 October 2022 | 2022 Asunción | |
| Heptathlon | 100m H (wind) / High jump / Shot put / 200m (wind) / Long jump (wind) / Javelin / 800m; 13.34 (+0.0 m/s) / 1.68 m / 13.71 m / 25.37 (−0.4 m/s) / 6.17 m (−0.8 m/s) / 54.22 m / 2:26.58 | | | | | |
| 20,000 m walk (track) | 1:31:46.9 h | Sandra Arenas | Colombia | 13 March 2014 | 2014 Santiago | |
| 20 km walk (road) | 1:31:34 | Glenda Morejón | Ecuador | 12 October 2022 | 2022 Asunción | |
| 35 km walk (road) | 2:50:57 | Viviane Lyra | Brazil | 14 October 2022 | 2022 Asunción | |
| 4 × 100 m relay | 44.36 | Marlet Ospino; Angélica Gamboa; Danna Banquez; María Camila Maturana | Colombia | 25 September 2026 | 2026 Santa Fe | |
| 4 × 400 m relay | 3:31.30 A | Lina Licona; Rosangélica Escobar; Valeria Cabezas; Evelis Aguilar | Colombia | 15 October 2022 | 2022 Asunción | |

== Mixed records ==
| Event | Record | Athlete | Nationality | Date | Meet | Ref. |
|---|---|---|---|---|---|---|
| 4 × 100 m relay | 41.87 | Bryant Álamo; Orangys Jiménez; Alexis Nieves; Glanyernis Guerra | Venezuela | 22 September 2026 | 2026 Santa Fe | |
| 4 × 400 m relay | 3:16.93 | Agustín Pinti; María Lamboglia; Elian Larregina; Megan Powell | Argentina | 24 September 2026 | 2026 Santa Fe | |

Key:
| ^{WR} World record | ^{AR} South American record | ^{NR} National record | ^{A} affected by altitude |

== Records in defunct events ==
=== Men's events ===
| Event | Record | Name | Nation | Date | Meet | Ref. |
|---|---|---|---|---|---|---|
| Hammer throw (Junior implement, 6 kg) | 73.69 m | Fabián Di Paolo | Argentina | August 2002 | 2002 Belém | |
| Javelin throw (original model) | 77.98 m | Luis Lucumi | Colombia | | 1982 Santa Fe | |
| 10,000 m walk (track) | 43:11.39 | Rafael Duarte | Brazil | August 2002 | 2002 Belém | |
| 50 km walk (road) | 3:55:48 A | Andrés Chocho | Ecuador | 5 June 2018 | 2018 Cochabamba | |

=== Women's events ===
| Event | Record | Name | Nation | Date | Meet | Ref. |
|---|---|---|---|---|---|---|
| 3000 m | 9:31.06 | Erika Olivera | Chile | November 1994 | 1994 Valencia | |
| Pentathlon | 3798 pts A | Nancy Vallecilla | Ecuador | November 1978 | 1978 La Paz | |
| 10,000 m walk (track) | 47:59.2 A | Bertha Vera | Ecuador | October 1998 | 1998 Cuenca | |

== See also ==
- List of South American records in athletics
- List of South American Under-23 Championships records
- List of South American Junior Championships records
