= Martín Sáenz =

Chilean athlete (born 2001)

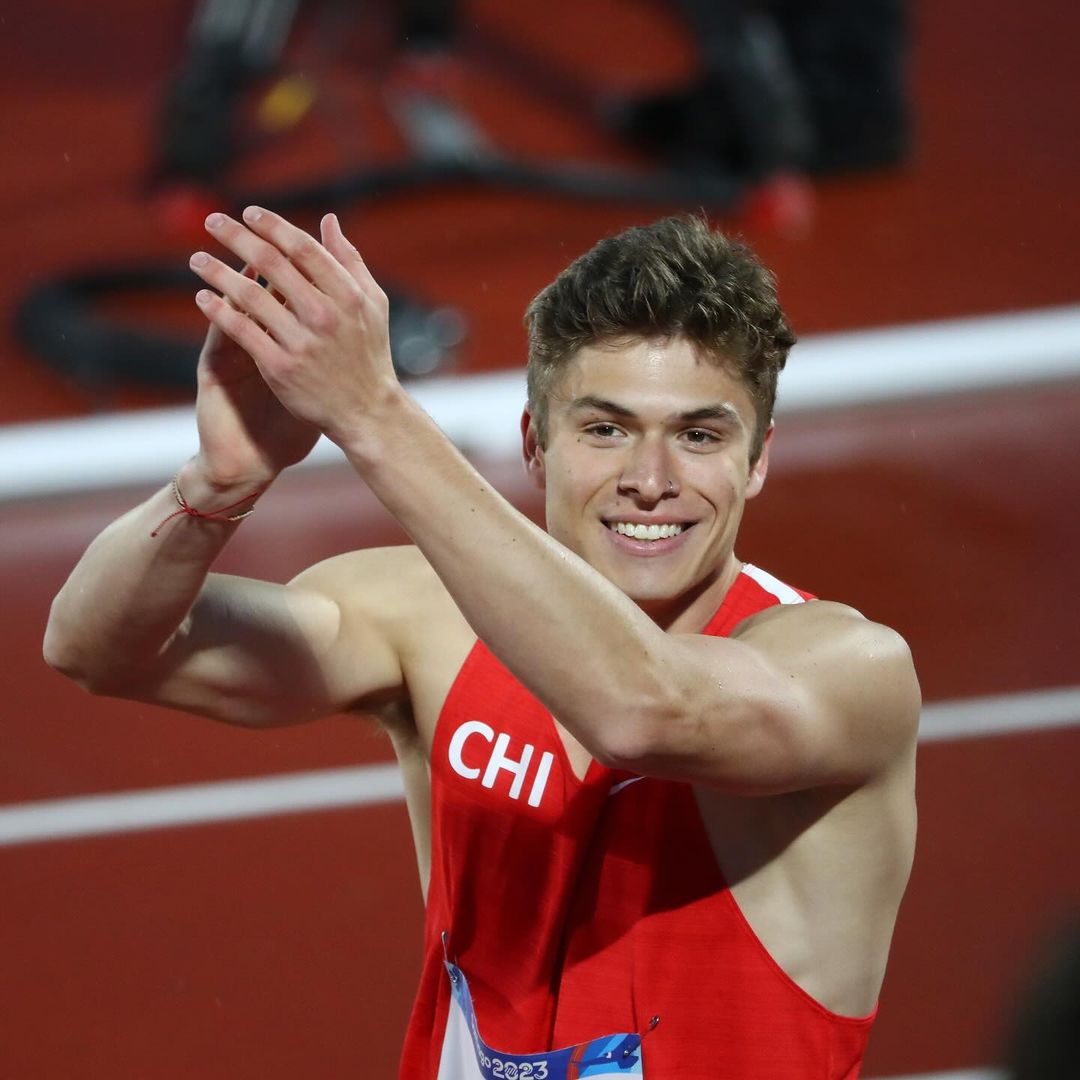

Personal information
- Nationality: Chile
- Born: Martín Sáenz de Santa María Jarry; 17 January 2001 (age 25)

Sport
- Sport: Athletics
- Events: 60 metres hurdles; 110 metres hurdles

Achievements and titles
- Personal bests: 60 m hurdles: 7.66s (Cochabamba, 2024) NR; 110 m hurdles: 13.46 (Santiago, 2026) NR
Medal record
Representing Chile
Men's athletics
South American Games
Silver medal – second place	2026 Santa Fe	110 m hurdles
South American Championships
Gold medal – first place	2025 Mar del Plata	110 m hurdles
Bronze medal – third place	2023 São Paulo	110 m hurdles
South American Indoor Championships
Silver medal – second place	2024 Cochabamba	60 m hurdles
Bolivarian Games
Bronze medal – third place	2022 Valledupar	110 m hurdles
South American Youth Games
Silver medal – second place	2017 Santiago	110 m hurdles
South American U23 Championships
Silver medal – second place	2021 Guayaquil	110 m hurdles
Silver medal – second place	2022 Cascavel	110 m hurdles
South American U20 Championships
Bronze medal – third place	2019 Cali	110 m hurdles
South U18 American Championships
Bronze medal – third place	2018 Cuenca	110 m hurdles

Martín Sáenz de Santa María Jarry (born 17 January 2001) is a Chilean hurdler. He is the Chilean national record holder over 110 metres hurdles and 60 metres hurdles.

Sáenz is the cousin of Chilean tennis player Nicolás Jarry.

== Biography ==
He won bronze medal at the 2023 South American Championships in São Paulo in July 2023 in the 110 metres hurdles.

He set a new Chilean national record at the Chilean national championships in June 2023, running 13.60 seconds. He finished fourth in the 110m hurdles at the 2023 Pan American Games in Santiago.

He won silver in the 60 metres hurdles at the 2024 South American Indoor Championships in Bolivia, running a national record time of 7.66 seconds. He competed at the 2024 World Athletics Indoor Championships in Glasgow, Scotland.

He set a new Chilean national record for the 110m hurdles of 13.57 seconds in Santiago in April 2024. He lowered it to 13.49 seconds in Troyes in June 2024. He competed in the 110m hurdles at the 2024 Paris Olympics.

In March 2026, he competed over 60 metres hurdles at the 2026 World Athletics Indoor Championships.

== International competitions ==
Year	Competition	Venue	Position	Event	Notes
Representing Chile
2017	South American Youth Games	Santiago, Chile	2nd	110 m hurdles (91.4 cm)	14.55 s
2018	South American U18 Championships	Cuenca, Ecuador	3rd	110 m hurdles (91.4 cm)	13.95 s
2018	Youth Olympic Games	Buenos Aires, Argentina	12th	110 m hurdles (91.4 cm)	28.17 s^{1}
2019	South American U20 Championships	Cali, Colombia	3rd	110 m hurdles (99 cm)	13.98 s
2021	South American Championships	Guayaquil, Ecuador	—N/a	110 m hurdles	DQ
2021	South American U23 Championships	Guayaquil, Ecuador	2nd	110 m hurdles	14.24 s
2021	Junior Pan American Games (U23)	Cali, Colombia	4th	110 m hurdles	14.06 s
2022	South American Indoor Championships	Cochabamba, Bolivia	6th	60 m hurdles	8.01 s
2022	Ibero-American Championships	La Nucia, Spain	5th	110 m hurdles	16.29 s
2022	Bolivarian Games	Valledupar, Colombia	3rd	110 m hurdles	14.13 s
2022	South American U23 Championships	Cascavel, Brazil	2nd	110 m hurdles	13.91 s
2022	South American Games	Asunción, Paraguay	5th	110 m hurdles	14.23 s
2023	South American Championships	São Paulo, Brazil	3rd	110 m hurdles	13.76 s
2023	Pan American Games	Santiago, Chile	4th	110 m hurdles	14.05 s
2024	South American Indoor Championships	Cochabamba, Bolivia	2nd	60 m hurdles	7.66 s NR
2024	World Indoor Championships	Glasgow, United Kingdom	34th (h)	60 m hurdles	7.88 s
2024	Ibero-American Championships	Cuiabá, Brazil	5th	110 m hurdles	13.50 s w
2024	Olympic Games	Paris, France	18th (r)	110 m hurdles	13.95 s
2025	South American Championships	Mar del Plata, Argentina	1st	110 m hurdles	13.51 s
2026	South American Indoor Championships	Cochabamba, Bolivia	4th	60 m hurdles	7.69 s
2026	World Indoor Championships	Toruń, Poland	33rd (h)	60 m hurdles	7.79 s
2026	South American Games	Santa Fe, Argentina	2nd	110 m hurdles	13.81 s

^{1}Sum of two races
