= Athletics at the 2026 South American Games – Results =

These are the full results of the athletics competition at the 2026 South American Games which took place between 22 and 25 September 2026, in Santa Fe, Argentina.

== Men's results ==
=== 100 meters ===
Heats – 22 September
Wind:
Heat 1: -1.5 m/s, Heat 2: -1.0 m/s, Heat 3: -1.2 m/s

Rank	Heat	Name	Nationality	Time	Notes
1	1	Ronal Longa	Colombia	10.21	Q
2	2	Alexis Nieves	Venezuela	10.41	Q
3	1	Lucas Villegas	Argentina	10.44	Q
4	3	Bryant Álamo	Venezuela	10.47	Q
5	2	Tomás Villegas	Argentina	10.57	Q
6	2	Katriel Angulo	Ecuador	10.58	q
7	2	Erik Cardoso	Brazil	10.60	q
8	1	Onesi Dunn	Guyana	10.66	
9	3	Carlos Palacios	Colombia	10.70	Q
10	1	Gustavo Mongelós	Paraguay	10.71	
11	3	Akeem Stewart	Guyana	10.76	
12	2	Jonathan Wolk	Paraguay	10.78	
13	3	Julián Vargas	Bolivia	10.82	
14	3	Pedro Laker	Curaçao	10.87	
15	1	Roy Chila	Ecuador	10.95	
16	2	Zion Sambo	Curaçao	11.01	
17	3	Luis Angulo	Peru	11.04	
18	1	D'Angelo Huisden	Suriname	11.31	
	1	Bruno Rojas	Bolivia	DNS	

Final – 22 September

Wind: -0.5 m/s

Rank	Lane	Name	Nationality	Time	Notes
1st place, gold medalist(s)	4	Ronal Longa	Colombia	10.10	
2nd place, silver medalist(s)	3	Bryant Álamo	Venezuela	10.24	
3rd place, bronze medalist(s)	5	Alexis Nieves	Venezuela	10.33	
4	6	Lucas Villegas	Argentina	10.39	
5	2	Tomás Villegas	Argentina	10.49	
6	1	Katriel Angulo	Ecuador	10.55	
7	7	Carlos Palacios	Colombia	10.57	
	8	Erik Cardoso	Brazil	DQ	TR16.8

=== 200 meters ===
Heats – 23 September
Wind:
Heat 1: -0.6 m/s, Heat 2: -2.3 m/s

Rank	Heat	Name	Nationality	Time	Notes
1	1	Ronal Longa	Colombia	20.83	Q
2	1	Alexis Nieves	Venezuela	20.93	Q
3	2	Katriel Angulo	Ecuador	20.96	Q
4	1	César Almirón	Paraguay	21.01	Q
5	1	Shamar Horatio	Guyana	21.03	q
6	1	Juan Ignacio Ciampitti	Argentina	21.13	q
7	2	Tishawn Easton	Guyana	21.20	Q
8	2	Lucas Vilar	Brazil	21.21	Q
9	2	Daniel Londero	Argentina	21.23	
10	2	Neiker Abello	Colombia	21.24	
11	2	Gustavo Mongelós	Paraguay	21.55	
	1	Julián Vargas	Bolivia	DNS	

Final – 24 September

Wind: +0.9 m/s

Rank	Lane	Name	Nationality	Time	Notes
1st place, gold medalist(s)	5	Ronal Longa	Colombia	20.43	
2nd place, silver medalist(s)	7	Katriel Angulo	Ecuador	20.50	
3rd place, bronze medalist(s)	1	Shamar Horatio	Guyana	20.53	PB
4	4	Lucas Vilar	Brazil	20.60	
5	6	Alexis Nieves	Venezuela	20.64	
6	2	Juan Ignacio Ciampitti	Argentina	20.75	
7	8	César Almirón	Paraguay	20.81	
	3	Tishawn Easton	Guyana	DNF	

=== 400 meters ===
Heats – 22 September

Rank	Heat	Name	Nationality	Time	Notes
1	1	Alison dos Santos	Brazil	44.99	Q, GR
2	2	Elián Larregina	Argentina	45.71	Q
3	2	Javier Gómez	Venezuela	46.09	Q
4	1	Kelvis Padrino	Venezuela	46.26	Q
5	2	Matheus Lima	Brazil	46.29	Q
6	2	Martín Kouyoumdjian	Chile	46.64	q
7	1	Jhonatan Hoyos	Colombia	46.91	Q
8	1	Simeon Adams	Guyana	47.12	q
9	1	Agustín Pinti	Argentina	47.24	
10	1	Jeffrey Cajo	Peru	47.39	
11	2	Dusthin Morquecho	Ecuador	47.52	
12	2	Daniel Balanta	Colombia	47.69	
13	2	Revon Williams	Guyana	48.02	
14	1	Josué Nieves	Bolivia	50.75	
	2	Marco Vilca	Peru	DNS	

Final – 23 September

Rank	Lane	Name	Nationality	Time	Notes
1st place, gold medalist(s)	5	Alison dos Santos	Brazil	44.61	GR
2nd place, silver medalist(s)	7	Javier Gómez	Venezuela	45.48	
3rd place, bronze medalist(s)	2	Martín Kouyoumdjian	Chile	45.99	
4	4	Kelvis Padrino	Venezuela	46.18	
5	3	Jhonatan Hoyos	Colombia	47.05	
6	1	Simeon Adams	Guyana	47.53	
	8	Matheus Lima	Brazil	DNF	
	6	Elián Larregina	Argentina	DQ	TR16.8

=== 800 meters ===
Heats – 22 September

Rank	Heat	Name	Nationality	Time	Notes
1	1	Marco Vilca	Peru	1:51.02	Q
2	2	Ryan Ignaiker López	Venezuela	1:51.30	Q
3	1	Chamar Chambers	Panama	1:51.34	Q
4	1	José Antonio Maita	Venezuela	1:51.46	Q
5	1	Guilherme Orenhas	Brazil	1:51.52 (.516)	q
6	1	Franco Peidón	Argentina	1:51.52 (.518)	q
7	2	Eduardo Moreira	Brazil	1:51.65	Q
8	2	Rafael Muñoz	Chile	1:51.88	Q
9	2	Jeffrey Cajo	Peru	1:53.95	
10	2	Oliver Cabaña	Paraguay	1:54.03	
11	1	Leandro Daza	Bolivia	1:55.16	
12	1	Eden Antersyn	Aruba	2:02.69	
	2	Matías González	Uruguay	DNF	

Final – 24 September

Rank	Name	Nationality	Time	Notes
1st place, gold medalist(s)	Chamar Chambers	Panama	1:46.45	
2nd place, silver medalist(s)	Ryan Ignaiker López	Venezuela	1:47.00	
3rd place, bronze medalist(s)	Rafael Muñoz	Chile	1:47.14	
4	José Antonio Maita	Venezuela	1:47.28	
5	Guilherme Orenhas	Brazil	1:47.36	
6	Marco Vilca	Peru	1:48.71	
7	Franco Peidón	Argentina	1:49.68	
8	Eduardo Moreira	Brazil	1:51.00	

=== 1500 meters ===
22 September

Rank	Name	Nationality	Time	Notes
1st place, gold medalist(s)	Valentín Soca	Uruguay	3:46.05	
2nd place, silver medalist(s)	Diego Lacamoire	Argentina	3:47.16	
3rd place, bronze medalist(s)	Gerson Montes de Oca	Ecuador	3:47.71	
4	Frank Durán	Colombia	3:48.09	
5	José González	Venezuela	3:49.51	
6	Luis Huamán	Peru	3:54.03	
7	Edwar Márquez	Peru	3:54.37	
8	Eden Antersyn	Aruba	4:21.35	

=== 5000 meters ===
24 September

Rank	Name	Nationality	Time	Notes
1st place, gold medalist(s)	Valentín Soca	Uruguay	13:26.53	GR
2nd place, silver medalist(s)	Santiago Catrofe	Uruguay	13:32.19	
3rd place, bronze medalist(s)	Luis Masabanda	Ecuador	13:38.48	PB
4	Matías Reynaga	Argentina	14:00.87	
5	Joaquín Campos	Chile	14:15.86	
6	David Ninavia	Bolivia	14:22.94	
7	Luis Chávez	Peru	14:39.99	
8	Marcos Ramírez	Paraguay	15:16.98	
	Edwar Márquez	Peru	DNF	
	Carlos San Martín	Colombia	DNF	
	Ignacio Velásquez	Chile	DNS	
	Víctor Aguilar	Bolivia	DNS	

=== 10,000 meters ===
22 September

Rank	Name	Nationality	Time	Notes
1st place, gold medalist(s)	Santiago Catrofe	Uruguay	28:16.79	GR
2nd place, silver medalist(s)	Matías Reynaga	Argentina	28:26.17	
3rd place, bronze medalist(s)	Luis Masabanda	Ecuador	28:36.73	
4	David Ninavia	Bolivia	29:33.30	PB
5	Cristhian Pacheco	Peru	30:05.76	
6	Yerson Orellana	Peru	30:59.65	
7	Marcos Ramírez	Paraguay	31:46.17	
	Diego Uribe	Chile	DNF	
	Víctor Aguilar	Bolivia	DNF	

=== 110 meters hurdles ===
23 September

Rank	Lane	Name	Nationality	Time	Notes
1st place, gold medalist(s)	3	Rafael Pereira	Brazil	13.52	
2nd place, silver medalist(s)	4	Martín Sáenz	Chile	13.81	
3rd place, bronze medalist(s)	5	Thiago Resende	Brazil	13.89	
4	8	Diego Pérez	Argentina	14.26	
5	2	Marcos Herrera	Ecuador	14.40	
6	6	John Paredes	Colombia	14.47	
7	7	Sdewey Zhuang	Curaçao	15.04	

=== 400 meters hurdles ===
Heats – 23 September

Rank	Heat	Name	Nationality	Time	Notes
1	1	Matheus Lima	Brazil	49.10	Q, GR
2	2	Francisco Viana	Brazil	49.97	Q
3	1	Bruno de Genaro	Argentina	50.64	Q
4	2	Óscar Rodríguez	Venezuela	51.97	Q
5	2	Samuel Mosquera	Colombia	52.13	Q
6	1	Diego Courbis	Chile	52.19	Q
7	2	Julián Pereyra	Argentina	52.94	q
8	1	Stiven Méndez	Ecuador	52.98	q
9	1	Kevin Mendieta	Paraguay	54.96	

Final – 24 September

Rank	Lane	Name	Nationality	Time	Notes
1st place, gold medalist(s)	5	Matheus Lima	Brazil	48.58	GR
2nd place, silver medalist(s)	6	Francisco Viana	Brazil	48.73	
3rd place, bronze medalist(s)	7	Bruno de Genaro	Argentina	49.76	
4	8	Samuel Mosquera	Colombia	49.88	
5	4	Óscar Rodríguez	Venezuela	50.29	
6	2	Julián Pereyra	Argentina	51.26	
7	3	Diego Courbis	Chile	51.64	
	1	Stiven Méndez	Ecuador	DNF	

=== 3000 metres steeplechase ===
25 September

Rank	Name	Nationality	Time	Notes
1st place, gold medalist(s)	Diddier Rodríguez	Panama	8:31.89	GR
2nd place, silver medalist(s)	Wallace Evangelista	Brazil	8:32.33	PB
3rd place, bronze medalist(s)	Carlos San Martín	Colombia	8:33.01	
4	Tomás Vega	Argentina	8:47.84	PB
5	Gleison da Silva	Brazil	8:48.35	SB
6	José González	Venezuela	8:52.21	PB
7	Yeferson Cuno	Peru	9:07.20	
8	Frank Durán	Colombia	9:09.13	
9	Wilmer Santos	Bolivia	9:31.08	

=== 4 × 100 meters relay ===
25 September

Rank	Lane	Nation	Competitors	Time	Notes
1st place, gold medalist(s)	8	Colombia	Carlos Flórez, John Paredes, Carlos Palácios, Ronal Longa	39.09	
2nd place, silver medalist(s)	6	Venezuela	Eubrig Maza, Bryant Álamo, Alexis Nieves, Ángel Ramírez	39.14	
3rd place, bronze medalist(s)	3	Guyana	Akeem Stewart, Onesi Dunn, Revon Williams, Shamar Horatio	39.23	
4	4	Paraguay	Gustavo Mongelós, Jonathan Wolk, Fredy Maidana, César Almirón	40.03	
5	5	Chile	Ignacio Nordetti, Benjamín Aravena, Juan Pablo Nordetti, Tomás León	40.29	
	7	Argentina	Lucas Villegas, Juan Ignacio Ciampitti, Daniel Londero, Tomás Villegas	DQ	TR 24.5

=== 4 × 400 meters relay ===
25 September

Rank	Lane	Nation	Competitors	Time	Notes
1st place, gold medalist(s)	3	Venezuela	Kelvis Padrino, José Antonio Maita, Axel Gómez, Javier Gómez	3:03.38	GR
2nd place, silver medalist(s)	6	Argentina	Bruno de Genaro, Juan Ignacio Ciampitti, Agustín Pinti, Elián Larregina	3:06.29	
3rd place, bronze medalist(s)	5	Colombia	Neiker Abello, Daniel Balanta, Deiner Guaitoto, Jhonatan Hoyos	3:09.87	
4	7	Chile	Tomás León, Rafael Muñoz, Manuel Guzmán, Martín Kouyoumdjian	3:10.91	
5	4	Guyana	Jamal Clarke, Simeon Adams, Revon Williams, Akeem Stewart	3:12.55	

=== Half marathon track walk ===
23 September

Rank	Name	Nationality	Time	Notes	Penalties
1st place, gold medalist(s)	Caio Bonfim	Brazil	1:22:31	GR	~
2nd place, silver medalist(s)	David Hurtado	Ecuador	1:22:38		>
3rd place, bronze medalist(s)	Jordy Jiménez	Ecuador	1:23:26		~~
4	César Herrera	Colombia	1:23:56		~
5	Luis Henry Campos	Peru	1:24:45		>>
6	Jaime Ccanto	Peru	1:27:14		~>

=== High jump ===
23 September

Rank	Name	Nationality	1.95	2.00	2.05	2.08	2.11	2.14	2.16	2.18	Result	Notes
1st place, gold medalist(s)	Fernando Ferreira	Brazil	–	o	o	o	o	o	xxx		2.14	
2nd place, silver medalist(s)	Gilmar Correa	Colombia	–	o	o	o	xo	xxo	xx–	r	2.14	SB
3rd place, bronze medalist(s)	Thiago Moura	Brazil	–	o	xo	–	xo	xxx			2.11	
4	Nicolás Numair	Chile	–	–	xo	–	xxo	xxx			2.11	
5	Sebastián Daners	Uruguay	o	o	o	o	xxx				2.08	SB
6	Carlos Layoy	Argentina	–	o	xo	xxx					2.05	

=== Pole vault ===
22 September

Rank	Name	Nationality	4.80	5.00	5.10	5.20	5.30	5.40	5.45	5.55	Result	Notes
1st place, gold medalist(s)	Augusto Dutra de Oliveira	Brazil	–	–	–	xo	–	o	–	xxx	5.40	
2nd place, silver medalist(s)	Dyander Pacho	Ecuador	o	o	o	o	xxx				5.20	
2nd place, silver medalist(s)	Ricardo Montes de Oca	Venezuela	–	–	–	o	–	–	xxr		5.20	
4	Guillermo Correa	Chile	–	o	–	xxo	xxx				5.20	
5	Agustín Carril	Argentina	o	xxx							4.80	

=== Long jump ===
24 September

Rank	Name	Nationality	#1	#2	#3	#4	#5	#6	Result	Notes
1st place, gold medalist(s)	Arnovis Dalmero	Colombia	7.52	x	7.72	7.68	7.96	6.33	7.96	
2nd place, silver medalist(s)	Emiliano Lasa	Uruguay	7.68	7.69	x	7.73	x	7.83	7.83	
3rd place, bronze medalist(s)	Christopher Thiessen	Paraguay	x	7.36	7.69	x	7.70	x	7.70	
4	Martín Saavedra	Argentina	7.37	7.43	7.62	7.44	7.32	7.63	7.63	
5	José Luis Mandros	Peru	x	7.51	x	x	x	7.59	7.59	
6	Ángel Ramírez	Venezuela	7.30	6.89	7.23	7.41	7.14	7.55	7.55	
7	Eubrig Maza	Venezuela	7.30	x	x	7.26	6.31	7.27	7.30	
8	Erick Suárez	Bolivia	6.92	7.12	7.03	6.82	6.75	7.06	7.12	
9	Alexander Villalba	Paraguay	6.84	6.76	x				6.84	
	Alexsandro Melo	Brazil	x	x	r				NM	

=== Triple jump ===
25 September

Rank	Name	Nationality	#1	#2	#3	#4	#5	#6	Result	Notes
1st place, gold medalist(s)	Elton Petronilho	Brazil	15.70	16.53	16.84	15.90	–	16.40	16.84	GR
2nd place, silver medalist(s)	Felipe Izidoro	Brazil	x	x	x	x	15.33	16.00	16.00	
3rd place, bronze medalist(s)	Nazareno Melgarejo	Argentina	x	15.45	x	x	x	x	15.45	
4	Brendan Pérez	Venezuela	13.73	–	15.10	15.13	–	15.36	15.36	
5	Lloyd McCurdy	Guyana	x	x	x	14.70	15.27	x	15.27	
6	Jemerance Werson	Suriname	14.65	x	14.90	14.69	14.81	14.92	14.92	

=== Shot put ===
23 September

Rank	Name	Nationality	#1	#2	#3	#4	#5	#6	Result	Notes
1st place, gold medalist(s)	Willian Dourado	Brazil	19.85	19.49	19.99	19.86	19.98	20.27	20.27	
2nd place, silver medalist(s)	Welington Morais	Brazil	x	19.66	19.80	x	19.87	20.19	20.19	
3rd place, bronze medalist(s)	Ronald Grueso	Colombia	x	17.52	x	17.71	18.22	18.74	18.74	
4	Juan Manuel Arrieguez	Argentina	18.11	x	18.73	17.98	18.33	18.03	18.73	SB
5	Luis Fossa	Peru	16.53	16.10	x	16.05	16.71	x	16.71	

=== Discus throw ===
22 September

Rank	Name	Nationality	#1	#2	#3	#4	#5	#6	Result	Notes
1st place, gold medalist(s)	Claudio Romero	Chile	57.25	65.27	65.33	63.73	x	x	65.33	GR
2nd place, silver medalist(s)	Wellinton da Cruz Filho	Brazil	54.57	60.90	x	61.18	60.95	59.63	61.18	
3rd place, bronze medalist(s)	Juan Caicedo	Ecuador	59.64	x	x	60.92	x	x	60.92	
4	Lucas Nervi	Chile	60.46	x	x	x	x	x	60.46	
5	Luis Fossa	Peru	48.10	x	46.36	x	x	x	48.10	

=== Hammer throw ===
25 September

Rank	Name	Nationality	#1	#2	#3	#4	#5	#6	Result	Notes
1st place, gold medalist(s)	Humberto Mansilla	Chile	71.42	72.27	x	73.87	75.27	74.61	75.27	
2nd place, silver medalist(s)	Gabriel Kehr	Chile	75.05	x	74.40	73.22	75.02	73.51	75.05	
3rd place, bronze medalist(s)	Joaquín Gómez	Argentina	x	x	x	x	x	73.46	73.46	
4	Alencar Pereira	Brazil	69.50	71.72	x	71.16	71.99	72.68	72.68	
5	Fabián Serna	Colombia	69.68	70.33	71.11	67.55	67.55	70.27	71.11	NR, PB
6	Tomás Olivera	Argentina	64.52	68.02	x	67.14	62.90	62.02	68.02	

=== Javelin throw ===
24 September

Rank	Name	Nationality	#1	#2	#3	#4	#5	#6	Result	Notes
1st place, gold medalist(s)	Lars Flaming	Paraguay	82.95	82.40	84.36	82.71	79.06	82.19	84.36	GR
2nd place, silver medalist(s)	Pedro Henrique Rodrigues	Brazil	80.62	82.40	79.10	x	77.32	x	82.40	
3rd place, bronze medalist(s)	Billy Julio	Colombia	77.84	74.98	x	80.78	79.98	79.21	80.78	SB
4	Leslain Baird	Guyana	77.69	72.53	70.74	x	67.46	67.07	77.69	SB
5	Lautaro Techera	Uruguay	62.13	66.85	66.41	63.77	68.48	67.90	68.48	SB
6	Renato Bartet	Chile	65.18	56.65	59.63	x	58.96	61.97	65.18	

=== Decathlon ===
22–23 September

The highest mark recorded in each event is highlighted in yellow

Rank	Athlete	Nationality	100m	LJ	SP	HJ	400m	110m H	DT	PV	JT	1500m	Points	Notes
1st place, gold medalist(s)	José Fernando Ferreira	Brazil	11.23	6.90	13.71	1.89	49.80	14.33	45.65	4.70	70.53	5:00.92	7822	
2nd place, silver medalist(s)	Felipe dos Santos	Brazil	10.85	7.08	14.52	1.98	51.07	14.39	44.57	4.70	53.17	5:14.36	7656	
3rd place, bronze medalist(s)	Carlos Córdoba	Venezuela	11.58	6.69	12.46	1.92	50.51	16.68	40.25	4.50	63.93	4:38.38	7209	
4	Gerson Izaguirre	Venezuela	11.54	6.90	13.42	1.86	51.16	14.47	NM	4.60	53.13	DNF	6008	
5	Romeo Männel	Paraguay	11.22	7.03	11.31	1.92	DQ	17.20	35.38	NM	38.34	5:06.06	5047	
	Julio Angulo	Colombia	11.45	6.34	12.50	DNS	DNF							

== Women's results ==
=== 100 meters ===
Heats – 22 September
Wind:
Heat 1: -1.2 m/s, Heat 2: -1.9 m/s

Rank	Heat	Name	Nationality	Time	Notes
1	1	Orangy Jiménez	Venezuela	11.51	Q
2	2	Glanyernis Guerra	Venezuela	11.58	Q
3	1	Aimara Nazareno	Ecuador	11.63	Q
4	2	Ana Carolina Azevedo	Brazil	11.69	Q
5	1	María Camila Maturana	Colombia	11.83	Q
6	2	María Ignacia Montt	Chile	11.83	Q
7	1	Gabriela Mourão	Brazil	11.85	q
8	2	Marlet Ospino	Colombia	11.90	q
9	2	Ángela Tenorio	Ecuador	11.91	
10	1	Paula Daruich	Peru	12.05	
11	2	Aracely Pretell	Peru	12.18	
12	1	Xenia Hiebert	Paraguay	12.23	
13	1	Guadalupe Torrez	Bolivia	12.44	
14	2	Leticia Arispe	Bolivia	12.61	
	2	Macarena Giménez	Paraguay	DNS	

Final – 22 September

Wind: -0.2 m/s

Rank	Lane	Name	Nationality	Time	Notes
1st place, gold medalist(s)	5	Orangy Jiménez	Venezuela	11.39	
2nd place, silver medalist(s)	4	Ana Carolina Azevedo	Brazil	11.58	
3rd place, bronze medalist(s)	6	Aimara Nazareno	Ecuador	11.60	
4	7	María Ignacia Montt	Chile	11.61	
5	3	Glanyernis Guerra	Venezuela	11.65	
6	1	Gabriela Mourão	Brazil	11.72	
7	2	María Camila Maturana	Colombia	11.76	
8	8	Marlet Ospino	Colombia	11.81	

=== 200 meters ===
Heats – 23 September
Wind:
Heat 1: +0.1 m/s, Heat 2: NWI

Rank	Heat	Name	Nationality	Time	Notes
1	1	Orangy Jiménez	Venezuela	23.17	Q
2	1	Ana Carolina Azevedo	Brazil	23.40	Q
3	1	Nicole Caicedo	Ecuador	23.44	Q
4	2	Anahí Suárez	Ecuador	23.86	Q
5	2	Marlet Ospino	Colombia	24.09	Q
6	2	Guillermina Cossio	Argentina	24.11	Q
7	1	Cristal Cuervo	Panama	24.12	q
8	1	Alinny Delgadillo	Bolivia	25.34	
9	1	Xenia Hiebert	Paraguay	24.50	q
10	2	Kenisha Phillips	Guyana	24.67	
11	2	Leticia Arispe	Bolivia	25.82	
12	1	Aracely Pretell	Peru	24.92	
	2	Paula Daruich	Peru	DNS	
	2	Gabriela Mourão	Brazil	DNS	

Final – 24 September

Wind: +0.2 m/s

Rank	Lane	Name	Nationality	Time	Notes
1st place, gold medalist(s)	5	Orangy Jiménez	Venezuela	22.63	GR
2nd place, silver medalist(s)	8	Nicole Caicedo	Ecuador	22.95	
3rd place, bronze medalist(s)	7	Ana Carolina Azevedo	Brazil	23.26	
4	6	Anahí Suárez	Ecuador	23.28	
5	4	Marlet Ospino	Colombia	23.29	
6	2	Cristal Cuervo	Panama	23.78	
7	3	Guillermina Cossio	Argentina	23.89	
8	1	Xenia Hiebert	Paraguay	24.64	

=== 400 meters ===
Heats – 22 September

Rank	Heat	Name	Nationality	Time	Notes
1	1	Martina Weil	Chile	51.39	Q
2	1	Megan Powell	Argentina	53.09	Q
3	2	Lina Licona	Colombia	53.36	Q
4	1	Letícia Nonato	Brazil	53.92	Q
5	1	Cristal Cuervo	Panama	54.03	q
6	2	Jaíny Suelen	Brazil	54.32	Q
7	2	Génesis Cañola	Ecuador	54.50	Q
8	1	Melany Bolaño	Colombia	54.61	q
9	2	María Florencia Lamboglia	Argentina	54.98	
10	1	Kenisha Phillips	Guyana	55.41	
11	1	Walezka Ortiz	Venezuela	55.81	
12	2	Ana Torin	Venezuela	56.08	
13	2	Akeelah Dover	Guyana	1:02.16	

Final – 23 September

Rank	Lane	Name	Nationality	Time	Notes
1st place, gold medalist(s)	4	Martina Weil	Chile	50.45	GR
2nd place, silver medalist(s)	7	Lina Licona	Colombia	52.38	
3rd place, bronze medalist(s)	5	Megan Powell	Argentina	52.81	
4	6	Jaíny Suelen	Brazil	52.88	
5	3	Letícia Nonato	Brazil	53.65	
6	8	Génesis Cañola	Ecuador	53.69	
7	2	Melany Bolaño	Colombia	54.45	
8	1	Cristal Cuervo	Panama	54.73	

=== 800 meters ===
24 September

Rank	Name	Nationality	Time	Notes
1st place, gold medalist(s)	Valentina Barrientos	Chile	2:03.31	PB
2nd place, silver medalist(s)	Déborah Rodríguez	Uruguay	2:04.16	
3rd place, bronze medalist(s)	Mayara Leite	Brazil	2:04.26	
4	Berdine Castillo	Chile	2:06.16	
5	Victoria Olives	Argentina	2:07.92	
6	Araceli Martínez	Paraguay	2:13.99	
7	Cecilia Gómez	Bolivia	2:14.39	
8	Martina Escudero	Argentina	2:15.21	

=== 1500 meters ===
23 September

Rank	Name	Nationality	Time	Notes
1st place, gold medalist(s)	Micaela Levaggi	Argentina	4:22.43	
2nd place, silver medalist(s)	Laura Acuña	Chile	4:23.22	
3rd place, bronze medalist(s)	Tatiane Raquel da Silva	Brazil	4:23.42	
4	Carmen Alder	Ecuador	4:23.97	
5	Anita Poma	Peru	4:24.19	
6	July da Silva	Brazil	4:24.71	
7	Luz Arias	Peru	4:27.96	
8	Fedra Luna	Argentina	4:30.86	
9	María Pía Fernández	Uruguay	4:37.72	

=== 5000 meters ===
24 September

Rank	Name	Nationality	Time	Notes
1st place, gold medalist(s)	Micaela Levaggi	Argentina	15:48.73	
2nd place, silver medalist(s)	Lizaida Valdivia	Peru	15:53.97	PB
3rd place, bronze medalist(s)	Carmen Alder	Ecuador	15:54.23	PB
4	Mary Granja	Ecuador	15:59.64	PB
5	Ángeles Gómez	Argentina	16:24.11	
6	Veronica Huacasi	Peru	17:08.38	
	Edymar Brea	Venezuela	DNS	

=== 10,000 meters ===
22 September

Rank	Name	Nationality	Time	Notes
1st place, gold medalist(s)	Mary Granja	Ecuador	32:29.50	GR
2nd place, silver medalist(s)	Luz Mery Rojas	Peru	32:32.00	
3rd place, bronze medalist(s)	Nelida Peñaflor	Argentina	32:34.35	
4	Silvia Ortiz	Ecuador	33:17.25	
5	Gladys Tejeda	Peru	33:35.71	
6	Sofía Luna	Argentina	33:47.25	
7	Lilián Torrez	Bolivia	35:37.72	
	Edymar Brea	Venezuela	DNF	

=== 100 meters hurdles ===
23 September

Rank	Lane	Name	Nationality	Time	Notes
1st place, gold medalist(s)	4	Vitória Alves	Brazil	13.05	GR
2nd place, silver medalist(s)	6	Ketiley Batista	Brazil	13.31	
3rd place, bronze medalist(s)	7	Helen Bernard	Argentina	13.48	SB
4	3	Catalina Rozas	Chile	13.69	
	5	Juriviënska Koster	Curaçao	DNF	

=== 400 meters hurdles ===
24 September

Rank	Lane	Name	Nationality	Time	Notes
1st place, gold medalist(s)	5	Gianna Woodruff	Panama	54.11	GR
2nd place, silver medalist(s)	6	María Alejandra Rocha	Colombia	56.04	PB
3rd place, bronze medalist(s)	4	Rita Ferreira	Brazil	56.15	PB
4	7	Camille de Oliveira	Brazil	56.29	
5	3	Montserrath Gauto	Paraguay	1:01.06	PB
6	8	Lucía Sotomayor	Bolivia	1:02.44	

=== 3000 metres steeplechase ===
25 September

Rank	Name	Nationality	Time	Notes
1st place, gold medalist(s)	Belén Casetta	Argentina	9:35.44	GR
2nd place, silver medalist(s)	Tatiane Raquel da Silva	Brazil	9:44.10	
3rd place, bronze medalist(s)	Micaela Levaggi	Argentina	9:49.63	
4	Veronica Huacasi	Peru	9:56.39	PB
5	Luz Arias	Peru	10:04.61	PB
6	Antonella Bonomi	Uruguay	10:44.77	PB

=== 4 × 100 meters relay ===
25 September

Rank	Lane	Nation	Competitors	Time	Notes
1st place, gold medalist(s)	4	Colombia	Marlet Ospino, Angélica Gamboa, Danna Banquez, María Camila Maturana	44.36	GR
2nd place, silver medalist(s)	6	Chile	Catalina Rozas, María Ignacia Montt, Pilar Rodríguez, Belén Ituarte	44.65	
3rd place, bronze medalist(s)	7	Brazil	Jaíny Suelen, Ana Carolina Azevedo, Larissa de Jesus, Vitória Cristina Rosa	44.79	
4	5	Argentina	Belén Fritzsche, Guillermina Cossio, María Florencia Lamboglia, Milagros D'Amico	44.79	

=== 4 × 400 meters relay ===
25 September

Rank	Lane	Nation	Competitors	Time	Notes
1st place, gold medalist(s)	7	Colombia	María Alejandra Rocha, Melany Bolaño, Marlet Ospino, Lina Licona	3:32.21	
2nd place, silver medalist(s)	6	Brazil	Júlia Ribeiro, Letícia Nonato, Jaíny Sulen, Maria Victoria Sena	3:33.54	
3rd place, bronze medalist(s)	5	Argentina	María Florencia Lamboglia, Noelia Martínez, Guillermina Cossio, Megan Powell	3:35.55	

=== High jump ===
25 September

Rank	Name	Nationality	1.55	1.60	1.65	1.70	1.73	1.76	1.79	1.81	1.83	1.85	1.87	1.90	Result	Notes
1st place, gold medalist(s)	Glenka Antonia	Curaçao	–	–	–	–	–	o	o	o	o	xo	xo	xxx	1.87	
2nd place, silver medalist(s)	Maria Eduarda de Oliveira	Brazil	–	–	o	o	o	o	o	o	o	xo	xxx		1.85	=SB
3rd place, bronze medalist(s)	María Isabel Arboleda	Colombia	–	–	–	o	o	o	o	o	o	xxo	xxx		1.85	
4	Betsabé Páez	Argentina	–	–	o	o	o	o	o	xr					1.79	
5	Roberta Almeida	Brazil	–	–	xo	o	o	o	xo	xxx					1.79	
6	Lorena Aires	Uruguay	–	–	o	o	o	xxx							1.73	
7	Carla Ríos	Bolivia	o	xxo	xxx										1.60	

=== Pole vault ===
24 September

Rank	Name	Nationality	3.20	3.40	3.60	3.80	3.90	4.00	4.05	4.10	4.15	4.20	4.25	4.30	4.35	4.40	Result	Notes
1st place, gold medalist(s)	Juliana Campos	Brazil	–	–	–	o	–	o	–	o	–	o	–	o	–	xo	4.40	
2nd place, silver medalist(s)	Beatriz Chagas	Brazil	–	–	–	o	–	o	–	o	–	xo	–	xo	–	xxx	4.30	
3rd place, bronze medalist(s)	Luna Pabón	Colombia	–	–	–	o	xo	o	–	o	xo	xo	o	xxx			4.25	PB
4	Carolina Scarponi	Argentina	–	–	o	o	o	o	–	xxx							4.00	
5	Josefina Britez	Paraguay	o	xo	xxo	xxx											3.60	PB
	Stefany Castillo	Colombia	–	–	–	–	xxx										NM	

=== Long jump ===
22 September

Rank	Name	Nationality	#1	#2	#3	#4	#5	#6	Result	Notes
1st place, gold medalist(s)	Nathalee Aranda	Panama	6.38	6.48	x	6.45	6.42	4.86	6.48	
2nd place, silver medalist(s)	Javiera Musalem	Chile	6.11	x	x	6.29	x	6.32	6.32	
3rd place, bronze medalist(s)	Letícia Oro Melo	Brazil	x	5.95	x	x	6.10	x	6.10	
4	Daniela Vaca	Bolivia	5.38	x	5.72	x	5.25	5.55	5.72	
	Rivka Goede	Curaçao							DNS	

=== Triple jump ===
23 September

Rank	Name	Nationality	#1	#2	#3	#4	#5	#6	Result	Notes
1st place, gold medalist(s)	Gabriele dos Santos	Brazil	x	13.19	13.04	13.57	12.04	x	13.57	
2nd place, silver medalist(s)	Regiclécia Cândido	Brazil	12.93	13.15	12.98	x	13.16	13.10	13.16	
3rd place, bronze medalist(s)	Valeria Quispe	Bolivia	12.59	x	12.74	x	x	x	12.74	
4	Jenifer Mendoza	Venezuela	x	x	x	12.41	12.09	12.67	12.67	
5	Nerly Cantoni	Colombia	12.42	12.18	12.51	11.74	x	x	12.51	
6	Millie Díaz	Uruguay	x	11.82	11.96	x	12.26	12.25	12.26	

=== Discus throw ===
22 September

Rank	Name	Nationality	#1	#2	#3	#4	#5	#6	Result	Notes
1st place, gold medalist(s)	Andressa de Morais	Brazil	52.58	57.30	55.03	59.36	57.62	58.26	59.36	
2nd place, silver medalist(s)	Yerlin Mesa	Colombia	49.34	54.58	53.70	x	x	55.49	55.49	
3rd place, bronze medalist(s)	Ottaynis Febres	Venezuela	49.30	50.42	49.73	51.98	x	47.24	51.98	
4	Isabella Mosquera	Colombia	x	x	48.14	51.30	48.26	x	51.30	
5	Belsy Quiñónez	Ecuador	x	47.67	x	x	x	45.18	47.67	

=== Hammer throw ===
25 September

Rank	Name	Nationality	#1	#2	#3	#4	#5	#6	Result	Notes
1st place, gold medalist(s)	Mayra Gaviria	Colombia	65.15	66.35	x	x	64.57	63.44	66.35	
2nd place, silver medalist(s)	Ximena Zorrilla	Peru	x	x	61.44	64.43	x	x	64.43	
3rd place, bronze medalist(s)	Rosa Rodríguez	Venezuela	58.88	62.29	62.86	63.66	64.34	62.45	64.34	
4	Mariana Walker	Chile	x	62.17	x	62.63	61.20	59.70	62.63	
5	Giuliana Baigorria	Argentina	x	57.45	57.29	56.57	55.81	x	57.45	

=== Javelin throw ===
24 September

Rank	Name	Nationality	#1	#2	#3	#4	#5	#6	Result	Notes
1st place, gold medalist(s)	Flor Ruiz	Colombia	58.74	61.78	x	62.30	x	x	62.30	SB
2nd place, silver medalist(s)	Jucilene de Lima	Brazil	47.23	54.66	x	x	54.71	53.49	54.71	
3rd place, bronze medalist(s)	Daniella Nisimura	Brazil	53.52	47.80	x	51.54	54.69	51.33	54.69	
4	Manuela Rotundo	Uruguay	51.45	x	x	x	x	54.35	54.35	SB
5	Juleisy Angulo	Ecuador	x	49.61	52.08	x	–	x	52.08	
6	Julieta Salguero	Argentina	48.24	51.16	x	51.55	x	48.00	51.55	SB

=== Heptathlon ===
24–25 September

The highest mark recorded in each event is highlighted in yellow

Rank	Athlete	Nationality	100m H	HJ	SP	200m	LJ	JT	800m	Points	Notes
1st place, gold medalist(s)	Paloma Cardoso	Brazil	14.42	1.83	11.22	25.29	5.59	44.29	2:25.47	5633	
2nd place, silver medalist(s)	Mariangelic Rojas	Venezuela	13.71	1.62	11.67	23.92	5.93	33.50	2:23.87	5549	PB
3rd place, bronze medalist(s)	Marienger Chirinos	Venezuela	14.09	1.65	11.95	24.85	5.69	36.40	2:19.19	5509	
4	Mariam Buenanueva	Argentina	14.27	1.56	12.27	25.43	5.67	35.35	2:23.35	5264	
5	Daniela Vaca	Bolivia	16.41	1.59	8.32	25.40	5.55	32.61	2:29.55	4599	PB
6	Tamara de Sousa	Brazil	14.87	1.65	14.41	28.13	4.75	40.05	DNF	4256	
7	Sofía Ingold	Uruguay	14.88	1.38	8.78	26.29	5.03	27.39	2:30.58	4251	

== Mixed results ==
=== 4 × 100 meters relay ===
22 September

Rank	Lane	Nation	Competitors	Time	Notes
1st place, gold medalist(s)	1	Venezuela	Bryant Álamo, Orangys Jiménez, Alexis Nieves, Glanyernis Guerra	41.87	GR
2nd place, silver medalist(s)	5	Argentina	Lucas Villegas, Milagros D'Amico, Tomás Mondino, Guillermina Cossio	42.22	
3rd place, bronze medalist(s)	6	Colombia	Carlos Flórez, Angélica Gamboa, Carlos Palacios, Danna Banquez	42.37	
4	8	Chile	Juan Pablo Nordetti, María Ignacia Montt, Benjamín Aravena, Belén Ituarte	42.40	
5	3	Ecuador	Katriel Angulo, Nicole Caicedo, Roy Chila, Aimara Nazareno	42.74	
6	7	Brazil	Darley Santos, Gabriela Mourão, Erik Cardoso, Ana Carolina Azevedo	42.82	
7	2	Paraguay	Gustavo Mongelós, Macarena Giménez, César Almirón, Xenia Hiebert	42.98	
8	4	Bolivia	Bruno Rojas, Leticia Arispe, Julián Vargas, Alinny Delgadillo	44.63	

=== 4 × 400 meters relay ===
24 September

Rank	Lane	Nation	Competitors	Time	Notes
1st place, gold medalist(s)	5	Argentina	Agustín Pinti, María Florencia Lamboglia, Elian Larregina, Megan Powell	3:16.93	GR
2nd place, silver medalist(s)	2	Colombia	Daniel Balanta, Melany Bolaño, Julio Angulo, Lina Licona	3:17.78	PB
3rd place, bronze medalist(s)	7	Ecuador	Dhustin Morquecho, Genesis Cañola, Mateus Méndez, Nicole Caicedo	3:18.33	NR
4	3	Chile	Martín Zabala, Elisa Aguado, Martín Kouyoumdjian, Martina Weil	3:18.36	PB
5	4	Brazil	Emerson Nascimento, Letícia Nonato, Guilherme Orenhas, Jaíny Suelen	3:18.52	
6	6	Venezuela	Axel Gómez, Ana Torin, Ryan López, Waleska Ortiz	3:21.90	
7	8	Guyana	Simeon Adams, Kenisha Phillips, Revon Williams, Akeelah Dover	3:28.25	
8	1	Bolivia	Leandro Daza, Cecilia Gómez, Josué Nieves, Lucía Sotomayor	3:37.25	
