= 2021 South American Under-23 Championships in Athletics – Results =

These are the full results of the 2021 South American Under-23 Championships in Athletics which took place between October 16 and 17 at Estadio Modelo Alberto Spencer Herrera in Guayaquil, Ecuador.

== Men's results ==
=== 100 meters ===
Heats – October 16
Wind:
Heat 1: +0.9 m/s, Heat 2: +0.5 m/s

Rank	Heat	Name	Nationality	Time	Notes
1	2	Erik Cardoso	Brazil	10.32	Q
2	1	Lucas da Silva	Brazil	10.46	Q
3	1	Franco Florio	Argentina	10.52	Q
3	2	Neiker Abello	Colombia	10.52	Q
5	2	Agustín Pinti	Argentina	10.53	Q
6	1	Anderson Marquinez	Ecuador	10.55	Q
7	1	César Almirón	Paraguay	10.61	q
8	1	Noelex Holder	Guyana	10.74	q
9	1	Jalen Lisse	Suriname	10.75	
9	2	Arnovis Dalmero	Colombia	10.75	
11	1	Eubrig Maza	Venezuela	10.78	
11	2	Julian Vargas	Bolivia	10.78	
13	2	Steeven Salas	Ecuador	10.82	

Final – October 16

Wind: +0.2 m/s

Rank	Lane	Name	Nationality	Time	Notes
1st place, gold medalist(s)	3	Erik Cardoso	Brazil	10.25	
2nd place, silver medalist(s)	4	Lucas da Silva	Brazil	10.41	
3rd place, bronze medalist(s)	2	Anderson Marquinez	Ecuador	10.46	
4	5	Neiker Abello	Colombia	10.49	
5	8	César Almirón	Paraguay	10.56	
6	6	Franco Florio	Argentina	10.58	
7	1	Noelex Holder	Guyana	10.59	
8	7	Agustín Pinti	Argentina	10.60	

=== 200 meters ===
Heats – October 17
Wind:
Heat 1: +2.6 m/s, Heat 2: +1.4 m/s

Rank	Heat	Name	Nationality	Time	Notes
1	2	Anderson Marquinez	Ecuador	20.90	Q
2	2	Lucas Vilar	Brazil	20.94	Q
3	1	Lucas da Silva	Brazil	20.98	Q
4	1	Katriel Angulo	Ecuador	21.16	Q
5	1	Carlos Palacios	Colombia	21.20	Q
6	2	Daniel Williams	Guyana	21.45	Q
7	2	Franco Florio	Argentina	21.46	q
8	1	Franco Camiolo	Argentina	21.62	q
9	1	Julian Vargas	Bolivia	21.65	
10	1	Noelex Holder	Guyana	21.72	
	2	Javier Gómez	Venezuela	DNS	

Final – October 17

Wind: -0.7 m/s

Rank	Lane	Name	Nationality	Time	Notes
1st place, gold medalist(s)	4	Anderson Marquinez	Ecuador	20.52	
2nd place, silver medalist(s)	3	Lucas da Silva	Brazil	20.68	
3rd place, bronze medalist(s)	5	Lucas Vilar	Brazil	20.99	
4	8	Carlos Palacios	Colombia	21.28	
5	6	Katriel Angulo	Ecuador	21.35	
6	1	Franco Florio	Argentina	21.40	
7	7	Daniel Williams	Guyana	21.59	
8	2	Franco Camiolo	Argentina	21.98	

=== 400 meters ===
October 16

Rank	Lane	Name	Nationality	Time	Notes
1st place, gold medalist(s)	4	Douglas da Silva	Brazil	47.22	
2nd place, silver medalist(s)	6	Javier Gómez	Venezuela	47.24	
3rd place, bronze medalist(s)	3	João Henrique Cabral	Brazil	47.40	
4	8	Alan Minda	Ecuador	48.66	
5	2	Daniel Williams	Guyana	48.99	
6	1	Miguel Maldonado	Ecuador	49.26	
	5	Revon Williams	Guyana	DNS	
	7	Jhonatan Rodríguez	Colombia	DNS	

=== 800 meters ===
October 17

Rank	Name	Nationality	Time	Notes
1st place, gold medalist(s)	Eduardo Moreira	Brazil	1:47.78	
2nd place, silver medalist(s)	Leonardo de Jesus	Brazil	1:48.31	
3rd place, bronze medalist(s)	Estanislao Mendivil	Argentina	1:49.39	
4	Marco Vilca	Peru	1:49.49	
5	Ryan López	Venezuela	1:50.02	
6	Juan Manuel Mena	Colombia	1:50.04	
7	Fernando Arevalo	Chile	1:51.68	
8	Alan Minda	Ecuador	1:53.72	
9	Ariel Montes	Ecuador	1:54.69	
	Sebastián López	Venezuela	DNS	
	Nicholas Daw	Guyana	DNS	

=== 1500 meters ===
October 16

Rank	Name	Nationality	Time	Notes
1st place, gold medalist(s)	Eduardo Moreira	Brazil	3:48.44	
2nd place, silver medalist(s)	Leandro Pérez	Argentina	3:49.16	
3rd place, bronze medalist(s)	Matheus Borges	Brazil	3:51.13	
4	Gonzalo Gervasini	Uruguay	3:51.52	
5	Julio Palomino	Peru	3:54.11	
6	Santiago Rodríguez	Colombia	3:54.69	
7	Brayan Jara	Chile	3:57.80	
8	Alan Andachi	Ecuador	4:02.26	
9	Lucas Jiménez	Ecuador	4:03.20	
	Sebastián López	Venezuela	DNS	
	Ryan López	Venezuela	DNS	
	Sir Kennard Hartog	Guyana	DNS	

=== 5000 meters ===
October 17

Rank	Name	Nationality	Time	Notes
1st place, gold medalist(s)	Edimar Souza	Brazil	14:33.44	
2nd place, silver medalist(s)	Fábio Correia	Brazil	14:41.40	
3rd place, bronze medalist(s)	David Ninavia	Bolivia	14:51.36	
4	Rolando Ortiz	Colombia	15:16.49	
5	Alan Andachi	Ecuador	15:32.47	
6	Braulio Villalva	Peru	16:39.39	
	Frank Lujan	Peru	DNF	
	Leandro Pérez	Argentina	DNF	
	José Zabala	Argentina	DNS	
	Alex Caiza	Ecuador	DNS	

=== 10,000 meters ===
October 16

Rank	Name	Nationality	Time	Notes
1st place, gold medalist(s)	Fábio Correia	Brazil	30:27.47	
2nd place, silver medalist(s)	Juliano de Araújo	Brazil	30:37.09	
3rd place, bronze medalist(s)	David Ninavia	Bolivia	31:08.34	
4	Ruben Barbosa	Colombia	31:08.36	
5	Alex Caiza	Ecuador	32:37.68	
6	Cristian Conterón	Ecuador	33:42.04	

=== 110 meters hurdles ===
October 16
Wind: +0.7 m/s

Rank	Lane	Name	Nationality	Time	Notes
1st place, gold medalist(s)	4	Marcos Herrera	Ecuador	14.10	
2nd place, silver medalist(s)	6	Martín Sáenz	Chile	14.24	
3rd place, bronze medalist(s)	8	Vinícius Catai	Brazil	14.27	
4	3	John Paredes	Colombia	14.28	
5	7	Kevin Simisterra	Ecuador	14.55	
6	2	Julian Berca	Argentina	14.77	

=== 400 meters hurdles ===
October 17

Rank	Lane	Name	Nationality	Time	Notes
1st place, gold medalist(s)	5	Francisco Guilherme dos Reis Viana	Brazil	51.17	
2nd place, silver medalist(s)	4	Matheus Coelho	Brazil	52.15	
3rd place, bronze medalist(s)	2	César Parra	Venezuela	52.31	
4	6	Cristobal Muñoz	Chile	52.93	
5	7	Byron Preciado	Ecuador	53.21	
6	3	Neider Abello	Colombia	53.63	
7	8	Edwin Arias	Ecuador	55.93	

=== 3000 meters steeplechase ===
October 16

Rank	Name	Nationality	Time	Notes
1st place, gold medalist(s)	Julio Palomino	Peru	8:51.65	
2nd place, silver medalist(s)	Vinícius Alves	Brazil	9:12.09	
3rd place, bronze medalist(s)	Natan Nepomuceno	Brazil	9:25.21	
4	Ronald Mamani	Chile	9:38.21	
5	José Miguel Tandazo	Ecuador	9:50.54	

=== 4 × 100 meters relay ===
October 17

Rank	Lane	Nation	Competitors	Time	Notes
1st place, gold medalist(s)	6	Colombia	Carlos Flórez, Neiker Abello, Carlos Palacios, Arnovis Dalmero	39.90	
2nd place, silver medalist(s)	5	Ecuador	Johan Tejena, Anderson Marquinez, Katriel Angulo, Steeven Salas	40.41	
3rd place, bronze medalist(s)	4	Argentina	Ezequiel Bustamante, Alejo Pafundi, Franco Camiolo, Franco Florio	41.29	
	3	Brazil	Vinícius Morães, Jonathan Bianco, Erik Cardoso, Lucas da Silva	DQ	

=== 4 × 400 meters relay ===
October 17

Rank	Nation	Competitors	Time	Notes
1st place, gold medalist(s)	Brazil	Evandro Martins, Marcos Morães, João Henrique Cabral, Douglas da Silva	3:08.78	
2nd place, silver medalist(s)	Ecuador	Katriel Angulo, Miguel Maldonado, Steeven Salas, Alan Minda	3:10.63	
3rd place, bronze medalist(s)	Colombia	Neider Abello, Juan Manuel Mena, Ronald Grueso, Neiker Abello	3:21.28	
4	Chile	Martín Sáenz, Fernando Arevalo, Luis Reyes, Cristobal Muñoz	3:24.89	
5	Argentina	Julian Berca, Franco Camiolo, Alejo Pafundi, Estanislao Mendivil	3:24.93	

=== 20,000 meters walk ===
October 16

Rank	Name	Nationality	Time	Notes
1st place, gold medalist(s)	Matheus Corrêa	Brazil	1:24:30.45	
2nd place, silver medalist(s)	César Herrera	Colombia	1:25:43.39	
3rd place, bronze medalist(s)	Gonzalo Bustán	Ecuador	1:30:51.90	
4	Paulo Henrique Ribeiro	Brazil	1:36:47.78	
	Jinson Calderón	Ecuador	DNS	

=== High jump ===
October 17

Rank	Name	Nationality	1.80	1.85	1.90	1.95	2.00	2.03	2.06	2.09	2.12	2.15	2.20	Result	Notes
1st place, gold medalist(s)	Elton Petronilho	Brazil	–	–	–	–	o	–	o	–	o	xo	xxx	2.15	
2nd place, silver medalist(s)	Nicolas Numair	Chile	–	–	–	–	o	–	o	o	xxo	xxx		2.12	
3rd place, bronze medalist(s)	Anderson Asprilla	Colombia	–	–	–	–	o	–	xo	xo	xxx			2.09	
4	Francisco Moraga	Chile	o	–	o	–	o	–	o	xxx				2.06	
5	Justin Herrera	Ecuador	o	–	–	o	o	o	xxo	xxx				2.06	
6	Eron de Araújo	Brazil	–	–	o	o	xo	o	xxx					2.03	
7	Brayan Ganan	Ecuador	o	o	xxo	o	xxx							1.95	
	Tortque Boyce	Guyana												DNS	

=== Pole vault ===
October 16

Rank	Name	Nationality	4.50	4.60	4.70	4.80	4.90	5.00	5.05	5.10	5.20	5.30	Result	Notes
1st place, gold medalist(s)	Dyander Pacho	Ecuador	–	–	–	–	–	xxo	–	o	xo	xxx	5.20	
2nd place, silver medalist(s)	Austin Ramos	Ecuador	–	–	xo	o	o	o	–	xxo	xxo	xxx	5.20	
3rd place, bronze medalist(s)	Pablo Zaffaroni	Argentina	–	o	–	o	–	o	–	xxx			5.00	
4	Lucca Torres	Brazil	–	–	o	xo	o	o	xxx				5.00	
4	Guillermo Correa	Chile	–	o	–	o	xo	o	–	xxx			5.00	
6	Sebastián Martín	Chile	xo	o	–	o	xxx						4.80	
7	Ignacio Sánchez	Peru	–	xo	xxo	xo	xxx						4.80	
8	Carlos Carabalí	Colombia	xo	o	o	–	xxx						4.70	
9	Carlos Mariano	Brazil	xo	o	xxo	xxx							4.70	

=== Long jump ===
October 17

Rank	Name	Nationality	#1	#2	#3	#4	#5	#6	Result	Notes
1st place, gold medalist(s)	Arnovis Dalmero	Colombia	7.81	7.95	7.81	x	?	8.04	8.04	
2nd place, silver medalist(s)	Weslley Beraldo	Brazil	x	7.55	x	x	x	7.86	7.86	
3rd place, bronze medalist(s)	Gabriel Boza	Brazil	7.60	x	6.20	7.84	x	7.75	7.84	
4	Jhon Berrío	Colombia	7.58	x	7.48w	7.51	7.43	7.36	7.58	
5	Eubrig Maza	Venezuela	x	7.21	x	7.03	7.52	7.57	7.57	
6	Ezequiel Bustamante	Argentina	6.56	x	6.95	6.85	x	7.17	7.17	
7	Matias González	Chile	6.43	6.89	6.99	6.87	7.06	7.09	7.09	
8	Gregory Palacios	Ecuador	6.50	6.55	6.70	x	?	?	6.70	
9	Santiago Cova	Venezuela	x	x	6.70				6.70	
	Anthony Williams	Guyana							DNS	
	Miguel Ángel Aronategui	Panama							DNS	
	Adrian Alvarado	Panama							DNS	
	Bruno Yoset	Uruguay							DNS	

=== Triple jump ===
October 16

Rank	Name	Nationality	#1	#2	#3	#4	#5	#6	Result	Notes
1st place, gold medalist(s)	Geiner Moreno	Colombia	16.10	x	x	15.90	16.00	16.21	16.21	
2nd place, silver medalist(s)	Frixon Chila	Ecuador	x	x	14.69	15.33	15.83	15.11	15.83	
3rd place, bronze medalist(s)	Gregory Palacios	Ecuador	15.52	x	15.76	15.78	x	15.44	15.78	
4	Felipe da Silva	Brazil	14.90	15.22	15.15	14.89	15.11	x	15.22	
5	Michael Agostinho	Brazil	15.07	x	15.07	14.71	15.06	15.06	15.07	
6	Luis Reyes	Chile	13.13	15.02	15.05	x	x	14.45	15.05	
7	Yoalber Rodríguez	Venezuela	14.14	14.38	14.61	14.27	x	x	14.61	
	Stafon Roach	Guyana							DNS	

=== Shot put ===
October 16

Rank	Name	Nationality	#1	#2	#3	#4	#5	#6	Result	Notes
1st place, gold medalist(s)	Nazareno Sasia	Argentina	18.75	18.48	x	x	19.11	18.60	19.11	
2nd place, silver medalist(s)	Ronald Grueso	Colombia	15.25	16.98	17.27	16.50	16.90	17.62	17.62	
3rd place, bronze medalist(s)	Camilo Reyes	Chile	16.94	x	16.41	17.33	x	x	17.33	
4	Mauricio Machry	Brazil	17.23	16.44	17.18	15.59	16.53	x	17.23	
5	Marcelo Lopes	Brazil	16.73	x	16.56	15.84	16.50	17.10	17.10	
6	Adrian Valencia	Ecuador	14.25	14.01	13.81	14.37	x	–	14.37	
7	Steven Cevallos	Ecuador	13.29	x	x	13.67	x	–	13.67	
	Jemaine Simmons	Guyana							DNS	

=== Discus throw ===
October 17

Rank	Name	Nationality	#1	#2	#3	#4	#5	#6	Result	Notes
1st place, gold medalist(s)	Lucas Nervi	Chile	58.82	60.26	60.56	60.13	60.87	x	60.87	CR
2nd place, silver medalist(s)	Alan de Falchi	Brazil	55.18	55.29	58.33	58.79	x	x	58.79	
3rd place, bronze medalist(s)	Nazareno Sasia	Argentina	x	54.21	55.24	54.77	54.05	x	55.24	
4	Ronald Grueso	Colombia	49.61	54.92	51.76	54.32	x	x	54.92	
5	Lazaro Bonora	Argentina	x	49.55	49.07	x	50.04	x	50.04	
6	Sebastián Juanillo	Colombia	45.66	x	45.11	48.81	48.23	49.18	49.18	
7	Steven Cevallos	Ecuador	32.89	46.50	43.40	47.54	x	43.62	47.54	
8	Adrian Valencia	Ecuador	39.15	44.89	x	x	x	x	44.89	
	Frederico Costa	Brazil	x	x	x				NM	

=== Hammer throw ===
October 16

Rank	Name	Nationality	#1	#2	#3	#4	#5	#6	Result	Notes
1st place, gold medalist(s)	Alencar Pereira	Brazil	x	66.17	68.10	67.62	67.20	69.81	69.81	
2nd place, silver medalist(s)	Daniel Leal	Chile	62.71	63.14	63.57	61.65	62.48	x	63.57	
3rd place, bronze medalist(s)	Julio Nobile	Argentina	59.35	x	x	61.53	60.36	61.63	61.63	
4	Cristian Suárez	Ecuador	x	57.26	57.68	57.46	52.91	58.69	58.69	
5	Erick Barbosa	Colombia	x	55.18	56.41	x	56.41	54.67	56.41	
6	João Carlos de Souza	Brazil	53.58	x	x	55.01	53.90	x	55.01	
7	Christopher Ambato	Ecuador	x	x	54.22	50.54	51.64	x	54.22	

=== Javelin throw ===
October 16

Rank	Name	Nationality	#1	#2	#3	#4	#5	#6	Result	Notes
1st place, gold medalist(s)	Luiz Maurício da Silva	Brazil	65.65	69.11	x	66.46	70.73	68.25	70.73	
2nd place, silver medalist(s)	Willian Torres	Ecuador	62.76	67.36	69.77	62.17	66.08	61.56	69.77	
3rd place, bronze medalist(s)	Antonio Gabriel Ortiz	Paraguay	65.47	x	67.81	62.14	64.18	65.14	67.81	
4	Jean Mairongo	Ecuador	65.18	x	67.56	67.58	x	64.11	67.58	
5	Lautaro Techera	Uruguay	63.30	65.38	66.87	63.47	60.06	63.38	66.87	
6	Pedro Henrique Rodrigues	Brazil	66.73	x	x	66.60	66.22	64.54	66.73	
7	Oneider García	Colombia	x	65.34	63.39	65.47	64.29	63.59	65.47	

=== Decathlon ===
October 16–17

The highest mark recorded in each event is highlighted in yellow

Rank	Athlete	Nationality	100m	LJ	SP	HJ	400m	110m H	DT	PV	JT	1500m	Points	Notes
1st place, gold medalist(s)	José Fernando Ferreira	Brazil	10.95	7.10w	13.32	1.93	50.41	14.38	41.97	4.10	66.58	DNF	7046	
2nd place, silver medalist(s)	Julio Angulo	Colombia	10.84	6.89	11.73	1.99	50.01	14.98	38.99	2.55	45.27	4:52.45	6755	
3rd place, bronze medalist(s)	Jonathan da Silva	Brazil	11.08	6.74	11.23	1.81	49.66	14.87	32.91	3.90	42.24	4:52.85	6676	
4	Esteban Ibáñez	El Salvador	11.32	7.04w	10.62	1.96	50.62	14.93	30.28	NM	42.63	4:48.88	6123	
5	José Luis España	Ecuador	11.44	6.47	10.11	1.69	52.85	18.33	34.68	3.10	45.90	4:48.61	5758	
	Ricardo Mireles	Venezuela	12.20	6.31	10.48	1.90	53.92	15.88	29.22	NM	DNS	–	DNF	
	Armando Bustos	Venezuela	11.76	6.41	12.66	1.93	56.60	DNF	DNS	–	–	–	DNF	

== Women's results ==
=== 100 meters ===
Heats – October 16
Wind:
Heat 1: +0.6 m/s, Heat 2: +1.1 m/s

Rank	Heat	Name	Nationality	Time	Notes
1	1	Anahí Suárez	Ecuador	11.46	Q
2	1	Gabriela Mourão	Brazil	11.73	Q
3	1	Guillermina Cossio	Argentina	11.73	Q
4	2	Lorraine Martins	Brazil	11.84	Q
5	2	Shelsy Romero	Colombia	11.94	Q
6	2	Jazmin Chala	Ecuador	11.94	Q
7	1	Laura Martínez	Colombia	11.95	q
8	1	Orangys Jiménez	Venezuela	11.97	q
9	1	Martina Coronato	Uruguay	11.97	
10	2	Anaís Hernández	Chile	11.98	
11	2	Leticia Arispe	Bolivia	12.14	

Final – October 16

Wind: +0.5 m/s

Rank	Lane	Name	Nationality	Time	Notes
1st place, gold medalist(s)	4	Anahí Suárez	Ecuador	11.46	
2nd place, silver medalist(s)	3	Gabriela Mourão	Brazil	11.77	
3rd place, bronze medalist(s)	2	Guillermina Cossio	Argentina	11.79	
4	5	Lorraine Martins	Brazil	11.83	
5	8	Laura Martínez	Colombia	11.86	
6	6	Shelsy Romero	Colombia	11.89	
7	7	Jazmin Chala	Ecuador	11.91	
8	1	Orangys Jiménez	Venezuela	12.00	

=== 200 meters ===
Heats – October 17
Wind:
Heat 1: +1.5 m/s, Heat 2: +1.4 m/s

Rank	Heat	Name	Nationality	Time	Notes
1	2	Anahí Suárez	Ecuador	23.38	Q
2	1	Guillermina Cossio	Argentina	24.04	Q
3	2	Letícia Lima	Brazil	24.08	Q
4	1	Tiffani Marinho	Brazil	24.34	Q
5	2	Anaís Hernández	Chile	24.72	Q
6	1	Nicol Caicedo	Ecuador	24.97	Q
7	1	Martina Coronato	Uruguay	24.97	q
8	2	Leticia Arispe	Bolivia	25.15	q
	2	Orangys Jiménez	Venezuela	DNF	
	1	Yanuelys Montilla	Venezuela	DNS	

Final – October 17

Wind: +0.3 m/s

Rank	Lane	Name	Nationality	Time	Notes
1st place, gold medalist(s)	4	Anahí Suárez	Ecuador	23.24	
2nd place, silver medalist(s)	3	Letícia Lima	Brazil	23.54	
3rd place, bronze medalist(s)	5	Guillermina Cossio	Argentina	23.98	
4	6	Tiffani Marinho	Brazil	24.54	
5	1	Martina Coronato	Uruguay	24.73	
6	8	Anaís Hernández	Chile	24.76	
7	2	Leticia Arispe	Bolivia	24.90	
8	7	Nicol Caicedo	Ecuador	24.91	

=== 400 meters ===
October 16

Rank	Lane	Name	Nationality	Time	Notes
1st place, gold medalist(s)	5	Angie Melisa Arévalo	Colombia	52.79	
2nd place, silver medalist(s)	4	Maria Victoria de Sena	Brazil	52.86	
3rd place, bronze medalist(s)	3	Martina Weil	Chile	53.47	
4	1	Rita Silva	Brazil	54.36	
5	6	Génesis Gutiérrez	Venezuela	56.02	
6	8	Evelyn Mercado	Ecuador	57.02	
7	2	Yanuelys Montilla	Venezuela	57.70	
8	7	Xiomara Ibarra	Ecuador	59.18	

=== 800 meters ===
October 17

Rank	Name	Nationality	Time	Notes
1st place, gold medalist(s)	Berdine Castillo	Chile	2:05.98	
2nd place, silver medalist(s)	Isabelle de Almeida	Brazil	2:07.68	
3rd place, bronze medalist(s)	Anita Poma	Peru	2:09.92	
4	Laura Acuña	Chile	2:10.49	
5	Yeimy Echeverry	Colombia	2:12.06	
6	Tania Guasace	Bolivia	2:14.62	
7	Angeli Garrido	Venezuela	2:14.98	
8	Emilly da Silva	Brazil	2:17.09	
9	Jennifer Toaza	Ecuador	2:19.13	
10	Wendy Criollo	Ecuador	2:26.63	

=== 1500 meters ===
October 16

Rank	Name	Nationality	Time	Notes
1st place, gold medalist(s)	Laura Acuña	Chile	4:27.56	
2nd place, silver medalist(s)	Isabelle de Almeida	Brazil	4:30.13	
3rd place, bronze medalist(s)	Gabriela Tardivo	Brazil	4:31.13	
4	Montserrat Sabag	Chile	4:33.13	
5	Grace Achote	Ecuador	4:43.73	
6	Wendy Criollo	Ecuador	4:52.88	

=== 5000 meters ===
October 17

Rank	Name	Nationality	Time	Notes
1st place, gold medalist(s)	Maria Lucineida Moreira	Brazil	16:51.67	
2nd place, silver medalist(s)	Sofia Isabel Mamani	Peru	16:57.07	
3rd place, bronze medalist(s)	Laura Espinosa	Colombia	17:04.85	
4	Sofia Luizaga	Bolivia	17:35.78	
5	Lizbeth Vicuña	Ecuador	17:44.62	
6	Estefania Aristizabal	Colombia	18:04.45	
7	Grace Achote	Ecuador	18:07.05	
8	Mirelle da Silva	Brazil	18:15.75	

=== 10,000 meters ===
October 16

Rank	Name	Nationality	Time	Notes
1st place, gold medalist(s)	Maria Lucineida Moreira	Brazil	35:25.83	
2nd place, silver medalist(s)	Sofia Luizaga	Bolivia	36:07.26	
3rd place, bronze medalist(s)	Virginia Huatorongo	Peru	36:28.07	
4	Angie Restrepo	Colombia	37:29.90	
5	Fabricia Stedille	Brazil	37:41.66	
6	Anna Tenorio	Ecuador	38:59.41	
7	Alexandra Aucannzhala	Ecuador	41:02.98	
	Alejandra Sierra	Colombia	DNF	

=== 100 meters hurdles ===
October 16
Wind: +2.4 m/s

Rank	Lane	Name	Nationality	Time	Notes
1st place, gold medalist(s)	4	Ketiley Batista	Brazil	13.45	
2nd place, silver medalist(s)	6	Nicol Caicedo	Ecuador	13.98	
3rd place, bronze medalist(s)	3	Daniele Campigotto	Brazil	14.44	
4	2	Thaynara Zoch	Bolivia	14.93	
	5	María Alejandra Murillo	Colombia	DNS	

=== 400 meters hurdles ===
October 17

Rank	Lane	Name	Nationality	Time	Notes
1st place, gold medalist(s)	4	Chayenne da Silva	Brazil	56.99	
2nd place, silver medalist(s)	3	Valeria Cabezas	Colombia	57.83	
3rd place, bronze medalist(s)	5	Marlene dos Santos	Brazil	59.60	
4	7	Andreina Minda	Ecuador	59.80	
5	2	Génesis Gutiérrez	Venezuela	1:01.59	
6	6	Adriana Alajo	Ecuador	1:04.34	

=== 3000 meters steeplechase ===
October 16

Rank	Name	Nationality	Time	Notes
1st place, gold medalist(s)	Mirelle da Silva	Brazil	10:28.93	
2nd place, silver medalist(s)	Clara Baiocchi	Argentina	10:41.61	
3rd place, bronze medalist(s)	Stefany López	Colombia	10:44.79	
4	Veronica Huacasi	Peru	10:46.36	
5	Leydi Roura	Ecuador	10:56.21	
6	Gabriela Tardivo	Brazil	10:59.05	
7	Lizbeth Vicuña	Ecuador	11:11.40	
8	Jimena Biglieri	Uruguay	12:44.31	

=== 4 × 100 meters relay ===
October 17

Rank	Lane	Nation	Competitors	Time	Notes
1st place, gold medalist(s)	4	Brazil	Vida Caetano, Lorraine Martins, Letícia Lima, Gabriela Mourão	44.48	
2nd place, silver medalist(s)	5	Ecuador	Jazmin Chala, Liseth Chillambo, Nicol Caicedo, Anahí Suárez	45.90	
3rd place, bronze medalist(s)	6	Chile	Rocío Muñoz, Martina Weil, Anaís Hernández, María Trinidad Hurtado	46.06	
4	3	Colombia	Valeria Cabezas, Laura Martínez, Angie Melisa Arévalo, Shelsy Romero	46.09	

=== 4 × 400 meters relay ===
October 17

Rank	Nation	Competitors	Time	Notes
1st place, gold medalist(s)	Brazil	Rita Silva, Tiffani Marinho, Giovana dos Santos, Maria Victoria de Sena	3:38.28	
2nd place, silver medalist(s)	Chile	Rocío Muñoz, Berdine Castillo, Anaís Hernández, Martina Weil	3:41.48	
3rd place, bronze medalist(s)	Colombia	Valeria Cabezas, Stefany López, Yeimy Echeverry, Angie Melisa Arévalo	3:46.19	
4	Ecuador	Adriana Alajo, Evelyn Mercado, Andreina Minda, Xiomara Ibarra	3:47.85	

=== 20,000 meters walk ===
October 17

Rank	Name	Nationality	Time	Notes
1st place, gold medalist(s)	Glenda Morejón	Ecuador	1:32:01.67	CR
2nd place, silver medalist(s)	Mary Luz Andía	Peru	1:35:27.73	
3rd place, bronze medalist(s)	Mayra Quispe	Bolivia	1:36:27.48	
4	Paula Milena Torres	Ecuador	1:36:54.22	
5	Laura Chalarca	Colombia	1:38:24.46	
6	Gabriela Muniz	Brazil	1:43:31.42	
7	Thaissa Cunha	Brazil	1:47:33.84	

=== High jump ===
October 16

Rank	Name	Nationality	1.60	1.65	1.68	1.71	1.74	1.77	1.80	1.85	Result	Notes
1st place, gold medalist(s)	Jennifer Rodríguez	Colombia	–	o	–	xo	o	o	xxo	xxx	1.80	
2nd place, silver medalist(s)	Arielly Rodrigues	Brazil	o	o	o	o	o	o	xxx		1.77	
3rd place, bronze medalist(s)	Olivia García	Chile	–	o	xo	xo	xo	xxx			1.74	
4	Silvina Gil	Uruguay	–	xxo	o	xxx					1.68	
5	Gabriela de Sá	Brazil	o	xo	xxx						1.65	
6	Emily Desiderio	Ecuador	xxo	xxx							1.60	

=== Pole vault ===
October 17

Rank	Name	Nationality	3.50	3.60	3.70	3.80	3.90	3.95	4.00	4.15	4.25	4.32	Result	Notes
1st place, gold medalist(s)	Isabel de Quadros	Brazil	–	–	–	–	o	–	xo	xo	xxo	xxx	4.25	
2nd place, silver medalist(s)	Karen Bedoya	Colombia	o	o	o	o	xxo	xo	xxx				3.95	
3rd place, bronze medalist(s)	Antonia Crestani	Chile	o	–	o	o	xo	xx–	x				3.90	
4	Javiera Contreras	Chile	o	–	o	o	xxo	xxx					3.90	
5	Luna Nazarit	Colombia	xo	–	o	xxx							3.70	
6	Sophia Salvi	Brazil	o	xxo	xo	xxx							3.70	

=== Long jump ===
October 16

Rank	Name	Nationality	#1	#2	#3	#4	#5	#6	Result	Notes
1st place, gold medalist(s)	Thaina Fernandes	Brazil	6.25	5.93w	6.29	6.20	6.35w	6.44w	6.44w	
2nd place, silver medalist(s)	Lissandra Campos	Brazil	x	6.12w	6.33	x	6.24w	x	6.33	
3rd place, bronze medalist(s)	Chantoba Bright	Guyana	5.83	5.75	5.87	6.09	x	x	6.09	
4	María Trinidad Hurtado	Chile	5.94w	6.05	5.93	6.04w	5.87	5.89	6.05	
5	Rocío Muñoz	Chile	x	6.00w	x	x	5.75	5.97w	6.00w	
6	Thaynara Zoch	Bolivia	5.78	5.80	5.71	5.75	5.87	5.66	5.87	
7	Kiara Rodríguez	Ecuador	5.74	x	5.63	x	x	5.87	5.87	
8	Fernanda Maita	Venezuela	5.37	5.47	5.62	5.68w	5.58	5.70	5.70	
9	Kiara Lastra	Ecuador	5.16	x	x				5.16	

=== Triple jump ===
October 17

Rank	Name	Nationality	#1	#2	#3	#4	#5	#6	Result	Notes
1st place, gold medalist(s)	Nerisnelia Sousa	Brazil	12.91	13.15	13.08	x	13.07	–	13.15	
2nd place, silver medalist(s)	Chantoba Bright	Guyana	12.87	x	12.85	12.47	12.78	13.08	13.08	
3rd place, bronze medalist(s)	Leidy Cuesta	Colombia	12.61	11.30	12.80	–	x	x	12.80	
4	Fernanda Maita	Venezuela	x	11.96	x	12.04	12.62	x	12.62	
5	Kiara Lastra	Ecuador	11.34	x	11.84	11.77	12.55	x	12.55	
6	Mariana Muller	Brazil	x	x	12.37	12.37	12.22	12.49	12.49	
7	Melany Yugcha	Ecuador	x	11.72	11.38	11.72	x	x	11.72	
	Mairy Pires	Venezuela							DNS	

=== Shot put ===
October 16

Rank	Name	Nationality	#1	#2	#3	#4	#5	#6	Result	Notes
1st place, gold medalist(s)	Maria Fernanda de Aviz	Brazil	14.80	x	15.41	16.15	16.28	x	16.28	
2nd place, silver medalist(s)	Milena Sens	Brazil	x	15.82	15.53	x	15.81	15.92	15.92	
3rd place, bronze medalist(s)	Lorna Zurita	Ecuador	x	14.21	13.29	14.79	13.72	13.14	14.79	
4	Javiera Bravo	Chile	12.25	12.50	13.00	13.18	13.56	x	13.56	
5	Yosiris Córdoba	Colombia	13.35	x	13.39	x	12.65	–	13.39	
6	Esteisy Salas	Colombia	13.03	13.21	09.47	12.65	12.83	12.94	13.21	
7	Fedra Florentín	Paraguay	12.18	12.96	12.54	x	13.04	x	13.04	
8	Salomey Bol	Ecuador	11.42	11.53	11.91	10.86	12.36	12.55	12.55	

=== Discus throw ===
October 16

Rank	Name	Nationality	#1	#2	#3	#4	#5	#6	Result	Notes
1st place, gold medalist(s)	Catalina Bravo	Chile	52.56	54.53	53.47	55.38	53.01	x	55.38	
2nd place, silver medalist(s)	Yosiris Córdoba	Colombia	54.65	x	52.46	45.46	52.75	53.50	54.65	
3rd place, bronze medalist(s)	Valquiria Meurer	Brazil	51.77	49.13	51.64	52.84	51.39	53.27	53.27	
4	Merari Herrera	Ecuador	x	46.82	47.61	53.02	50.98	48.23	53.02	
5	Ingrid Martins	Brazil	46.71	46.89	50.96	x	45.79	49.77	50.96	
6	Brigidh Mayorga	Colombia	44.94	41.63	46.18	46.24	46.72	44.50	46.72	

=== Hammer throw ===
October 16

Rank	Name	Nationality	#1	#2	#3	#4	#5	#6	Result	Notes
1st place, gold medalist(s)	Carolina Ulloa	Colombia	49.97	59.83	61.28	62.51	x	62.27	62.51	
2nd place, silver medalist(s)	Ximena Zorrilla	Peru	x	58.00	x	60.57	x	x	60.57	
3rd place, bronze medalist(s)	Valentina Claveria	Chile	56.80	58.22	55.82	56.82	51.93	x	58.22	
4	Silenis Vargas	Venezuela	x	56.44	x	53.13	x	x	56.44	
5	Ana Caroline Silva	Brazil	x	56.00	x	x	x	52.79	56.00	
6	Nereida Santa Cruz	Ecuador	x	53.26	55.22	x	x	x	55.22	
7	Yennifer Barahona	Colombia	x	x	51.39	52.72	x	x	52.72	
8	Tânia da Silva	Brazil	50.63	52.08	x	50.23	48.60	x	52.08	
9	Carolina Calahorrano	Ecuador	x	49.17	50.91				50.91	
10	Caterina Massera	Argentina	40.94	41.96	45.51				45.51	
	Mariana García	Chile	x	x	x				NM	

=== Javelin throw ===
October 16

Rank	Name	Nationality	#1	#2	#3	#4	#5	#6	Result	Notes
1st place, gold medalist(s)	Juleisy Angulo	Ecuador	48.73	x	46.64	x	49.88	54.52	54.52	
2nd place, silver medalist(s)	Valentina Barrios	Colombia	45.51	48.77	46.81	50.63	50.92	53.59	53.59	
3rd place, bronze medalist(s)	Deisiane Teixeira	Brazil	52.79	49.84	47.80	49.35	52.21	51.38	52.79	
4	Luceris Suárez	Colombia	46.62	48.24	49.31	45.89	48.57	51.90	51.90	
5	Bruna de Jesus	Brazil	36.63	35.34	x	44.07	x	45.21	45.21	
6	Itati Rivadeneira	Ecuador	38.17	36.90	34.28	39.47	37.86	36.89	39.47	

=== Heptathlon ===
October 16–17

The highest mark recorded in each event is highlighted in yellow

Rank	Athlete	Nationality	100m H	HJ	SP	200m	LJ	JT	800m	Points	Notes
1st place, gold medalist(s)	Sara Isabel García	Colombia	14.27	1.54	11.31	25.33	5.79	35.28	2:23.51	5219	
2nd place, silver medalist(s)	Naiuri Krein	Brazil	14.54	1.66	12.32	26.15	5.13	36.62	2:23.67	5147	
3rd place, bronze medalist(s)	Larissa Macena	Brazil	14.29	1.63	10.94	26.31	6.02	30.64	2:30.02	5108	
4	Jaylyn Castro	Ecuador	15.92	1.36	9.16	27.52	4.55	31.43	2:40.61	3849	
5	Antonella Aranda	Argentina	15.62	1.39	8.53	27.71	4.90	21.36	2:35.26	3826	
6	Genesis Foronda	Ecuador	15.71	1.51	10.23	27.22	4.90	29.92	DNF	3628	
	Marianger Chirino	Venezuela	DNS	–	–	–	–	–	–	DNS	

== Mixed results ==
=== 4 × 400 meters relay ===
October 16

Rank	Nation	Competitors	Time	Notes
1st place, gold medalist(s)	Brazil	Evandro Martins (M), Tiffani Marinho (W), Giovana dos Santos (W), Marcos Morães (M)	3:25.09	CR
2nd place, silver medalist(s)	Ecuador	Freddy Vásquez (M), Evelyn Mercado (W), Andreina Minda (W), Steeven Salas (M)	3:39.19	
3rd place, bronze medalist(s)	Argentina	Guillermina Cossio (W), Estanislao Mendivil (M), Clara Baiocchi (W), Alejo Pafundi (M)	4:06.66	
