= Matheus Lima =

Brazilian sprinter (born 2003)

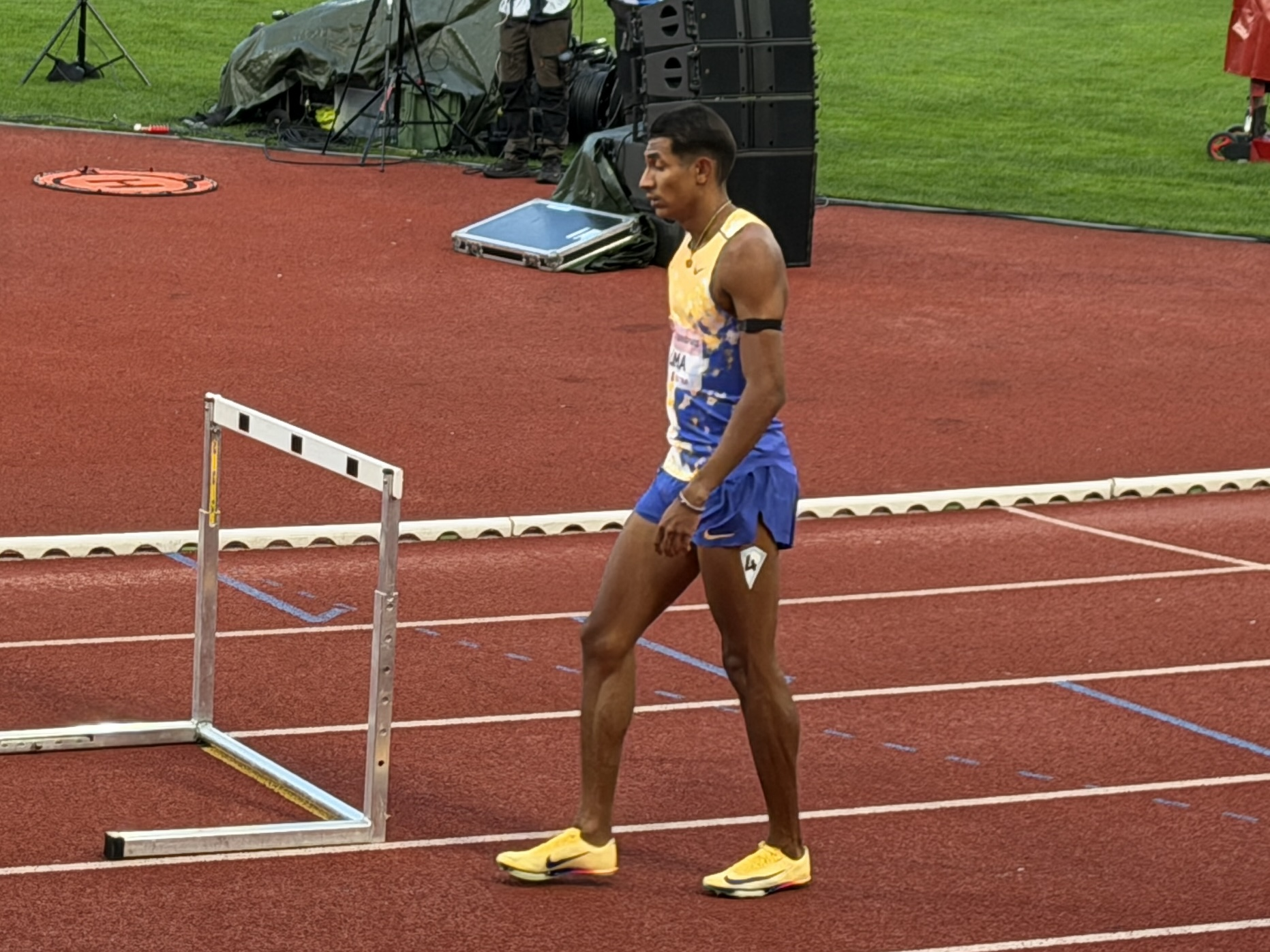

Personal information
- Full name: Matheus Lima da Silva
- Born: 1 June 2003 (age 23) Fortaleza, Brazil

Sport
- Sport: Athletics
- Events: 400 metres, 400 metres hurdles
Medal record
Men's athletics
Representing Brazil
Pan American Games
Gold medal – first place	2023 Santiago	4×400 m relay
Silver medal – second place	2023 Santiago	400 m hurdles
South American Games
Gold medal – first place	2026 Santa Fe	400 m hurdles
South American Championships
Gold medal – first place	2023 São Paulo	400 m hurdles
Junior Pan American Games
Gold medal – first place	2025 Asunción	4×400 m relay
Silver medal – second place	2025 Asunción	400 m hurdles

Matheus Lima da Silva (born 1 June 2003) is a Brazilian sprinter and hurdler specialising in the 400 metres and 400 metres hurdles.

In March 2024, he ran the second fastest time in Brazilian history in the 400m, with a time of 44.52, behind only Sanderlei Parrela. With this, he qualified for the 2024 Summer Olympics.

In April 2024, he obtained his second Olympic standard for the Paris 2024 Games, in the 400m hurdles, with a time of 48.55.

In the debut of the 300 metres hurdles event, he clocked 33.98 seconds, the second best in the history of the event, behind only world record holder Karsten Warholm.

Lima finished 2nd in the 400m hurdles event at the Shanghai leg of the 2025 Diamond League, with a time of 48.08. With this, he was 3rd in the world rankings for the event, behind Karster Warholm and fellow Brazilian Alison dos Santos. This time was also the 3rd best in Brazil's history in the event, behind only Alison dos Santos and Eronilde de Araújo.

At the 2025 World Athletics Championships, he finished 10th in the 400m hurdles, with a time of 48.16.

In 2026, showing clear improvement, he began running the 400m hurdles in the 47-second range. In August 2026, he set a personal best by clocking 47.26 seconds at the Diamond League meet in Silesia, Poland, finishing third behind only Karsten Warholm and Alison dos Santos, ranking at the time among the top 20 athletes of all time in this event.

== Personal bests ==
- 200 m – 21.28 (wind: +1.3 m/s) (São Paulo 2022)
- 400 m – 44.52 (São Paulo 2024)
- 300 m hurdles – 33.75 (Shaoxing 2026)
- 400 m hurdles – 47.26 (Silesia 2026)
