= Carlos Palacios (sprinter) =

Colombian sprinter (born 1999)

Personal information
- Full name: Carlos Andrés Palacios Murillo
- Nationality: Colombian
- Born: November 11, 1999 (age 26)
- Height: 1.75 m (5 ft 9 in)
- Weight: 75 kg (165 lb)

Sport
- Country: Colombia
- Sport: Athletics
- Events: 60 metres; 100 metres; 200 metres; 4×100 metres
- Club: Liga del Chocó

Achievements and titles
- Personal bests: 60 metres: 6.68 (2025); 100 metres: 10.08 (2025); 200 metres: 20.37 (2023); 4×100 metres: 38.48 NR; 4×100 metres mixed: 42.37 (2026)
Medal record
Representing Colombia
Men's athletics
Event	1st	2nd	3rd
Pan American Championships	0	0	1
CAC Games	0	1	0
South American Games	1	0	3
South American Championships	1	1	0
Bolivarian Games	0	0	1
South American U23 Championships	1	0	0
Total	3	2	5
Pan American Championships
Bronze medal – third place	2026 Medellín	4×100 m relay
Central American and Caribbean Games
Silver medal – second place	2023 San Salvador	200 m
South American Games
Gold medal – first place	2026 Santa Fe	4×100 m relay
Bronze medal – third place	2022 Asunción	100 m
Bronze medal – third place	2022 Asunción	4×100 m relay
Bronze medal – third place	2026 Santa Fe	4×100 m mixed relay
South American Championships
Gold medal – first place	2025 Mar del Plata	4×100 m relay
Silver medal – second place	2021 Guayaquil	4×100 m relay
Bolivarian Games
Bronze medal – third place	2022 Valledupar	100 m
South American U23 Championships
Gold medal – first place	2021 Guayaquil	4×100 m relay

Carlos Andrés Palacios Murillo (born 11 November 1999) is a Colombian sprinter. He has won several medals at regional level.

== International competitions ==
Year	Competition	Venue	Position	Event	Notes
Representing Colombia
2021	South American Championships	Guayaquil, Ecuador	7th (h)	200 m	21.22 s
2021	South American Championships	Guayaquil, Ecuador	2nd	4 × 100 m relay	39.65 s
2021	South American U23 Championships	Guayaquil, Ecuador	4th	200 m	21.28 s
2021	South American U23 Championships	Guayaquil, Ecuador	1st	4 × 100 m relay	39.90 s
2021	Junior Pan American Games (U23)	Cali, Colombia	6th	200 m	21.16 s
2021	Junior Pan American Games (U23)	Cali, Colombia	—N/a	4 × 100 m relay	DQ
2022	Ibero-American Championships	La Nucia, Spain	9th (h)	100 m	10.40 s w
2022	Ibero-American Championships	La Nucia, Spain	9th (h)	200 m	21.57 s
2022	Bolivarian Games	Valledupar, Colombia	3rd	100 m	10.23 s
2022	Bolivarian Games	Valledupar, Colombia	4th	200 m	20.97 s
2022	Bolivarian Games	Valledupar, Colombia	4th	4 × 100 m relay	40.19 s
2022	South American Games	Asunción, Paraguay	3rd	100 m	10.46 s
2022	South American Games	Asunción, Paraguay	12th (h)	200 m	23.74 s
2022	South American Games	Asunción, Paraguay	3rd	4 × 100 m relay	39.74 s
2023	Central American and Caribbean Games	San Salvador, El Salvador	9th (h)	100 m	10.46 s
2023	Central American and Caribbean Games	San Salvador, El Salvador	2nd	200 m	20.37 s
2023	South American Championships	São Paulo, Brazil	5th (h)	200 m	20.80 s^{1}
2023	South American Championships	São Paulo, Brazil	—N/a	4 × 100 m relay	DNF
2023	Pan American Games	Santiago, Chile	6th (h)	200 m	21.11 s^{1}
2024	World Relays	Nassau, Bahamas	10th (r)	4 × 100 m relay	39.04 s
2024	Ibero-American Championships	Cuiabá, Brazil	12th (h)	200 m	21.10 s
2025	South American Indoor Championships	Cochabamba, Bolivia	5th	60 m	6.68 s
2025	South American Championships	Mar del Plata, Argentina	1st	4 × 100 m relay	39.58 s
2025	World Relays	Guangzhou, China	10th (r)	4 × 100 m relay	38.84 s
2026	World Relays	Gaborone, Botswana	9th (r)	4 × 100 m relay	39.16 s
2026	Ibero-American Championships	Lima, Peru	8th (h)	100 m	10.37 s w
2026	Ibero-American Championships	Lima, Peru	—N/a	4 × 100 m relay	DNF
2026	Pan American Championships	Medellín, Colombia	6th	100 m	10.24 s
2026	Pan American Championships	Medellín, Colombia	3rd	4 × 100 m relay	38.85 s
2026	South American Games	Santa Fe, Argentina	7th	100 m	10.57 s
2026	South American Games	Santa Fe, Argentina	1st	4 × 100 m relay	39.09 s
2026	South American Games	Santa Fe, Argentina	3rd	4 × 100 m mixed relay	42.37 s

^{1}Did not start in the final

== Personal bests ==
Outdoor

- 100 metres – 10.08 A (+1.6 m/s, Bogotá 2025)
- 200 metres – 20.37 (-0.3 m/s, San Salvador 2023)
- 4 × 100 metres relay – 38.48 A NR (Bogotá 2025)
- Mixed 4 × 100 metres relay – 42.37 (Santa Fe 2026)

Indoor

- 60 metres – 6.68 A (Cochabamba 2025)
