= Bryant Álamo =

Venezualen athlete (born 2003)

Personal information
- Born: 11 August 2003 (age 23)

Sport
- Sport: Athletics
- Event: Sprint

Achievements and titles
- Personal bests: 60m:: 6.59 (2026) NR; 100m: 10.29 (2025); 200m: 21.10 (2025)
Medal record
Representing Venezuela
Men's athletics
Central American and Caribbean Games
Bronze medal – third place	2023 San Salvador	4×100 m relay
South American Games
Gold medal – first place	2026 Santa Fe	Mixed 4 x 100 m relay
Silver medal – second place	2026 Santa Fe	100 m
Silver medal – second place	2026 Santa Fe	4×100 m relay
South American Championships
Bronze medal – third place	2023 São Paulo	4×100 m relay
Bronze medal – third place	2025 Mar del Plata	4×100 m relay
South American Indoor Championships
Silver medal – second place	2026 Cochabamba	60 m

Bryant Álamo (born 11 August 2003) is a Venezuelan sprinter. He won the silver medal in the 60 metres at the 2026 South American Indoor Championships, setting a national record time.

== Biography ==
From Guárico, Alamo won a bronze medal at the 2023 Central American and Caribbean Games running as part of Venezuela's men's 4 x 400 metres relay team alongside Alexis Nieves, David Vivas and Rafael Vasquez as they secured a third-place finish in 39.13 behind Trinidad and Tobago and the Dominican Republic. That year, he also won a bronze medal at the 2023 South American Championships in Athletics in São Paulo, Brazil, as part of the Venezuelan 4 x 100 metres relay team. He also competed for Venezuela at the 2023 Pan American Games in Santiago, Chile.

In January 2024, he was a finalist over 60 metres at the 2024 South American Indoor Championships, in Cochabamba, Bolivia, placing sixth in the final in 6.83 seconds. In March 2025, Álamo, broke the Venezuelan national U23 record in the 100 metres, running 10.29 seconds to break the previous record set by Hely Ollarves, which had stood for 21 years. In April 2025, Alamo was part of the Venezuelan 4 x 100 metres relay team which won the bronze medal at the 2025 South American Championships in Athletics in Mar del Plata, Argentina.

In February 2026, Alamo placed second in a personal best time of 6.65 seconds for the 60 metres competing in Bolivia, in a race won by the Brazilian Erik Cardoso. Later that month, he won the silver medal in the 60 metres behind Gabriel Aparecido dos Santos of Brazil at the 2026 South American Indoor Championships, in Cochabamba, Bolivia, running a personal best and national record time of 6.59 seconds in the final. In March 2026, he was selected for the 2026 World Athletics Indoor Championships in Toruń, Poland, without advancing to the semi-finals. In September 2026, he won the silver medal in the 100 metres and gold in the mixed 4 x 100 metres at the 2026 South American Games.
