= Eduardo Ribeiro =

Eduardo Ribeiro may refer to:

- Eduardo dos Santos (footballer, born 1980), Brazilian footballer
- Eduardo Moreira, Brazilian middle-distance runner
- Eduardo Ribeiro (tennis), Brazilian tennis player
