= 2017 World Youth Championships in Athletics – Boys' triple jump =

The Boys' triple jump at the 2017 World Youth Championships in Athletics was held on 12 and 14 July.

== Medalists ==
Gold	Silver	Bronze

== Records ==
Prior to the competition, the following records were as follows.

World Youth Best	Lázaro Martínez (CUB)	17.24 m	Havana, Cuba	1 February 2014
Championship Record	Héctor Dairo Fuentes (CUB)	16.63 m	Marrakesh, Morocco	16 July 2005
Championship Record	Lázaro Martínez (CUB)	16.63 m	Donetsk, Ukraine	13 July 2013
World Youth Leading	Jordan A. Diáz (CUB)	16.66 m	Havana, Cuba	17 March 2017

== Qualification ==
Qualification rule: 15.30 m (Q) or at least 12 best (q) performers.

Rank	Group	Name	Nationality	#1	#2	#3	Mark	Notes	Points
	A	Muhammad Nazri Mustafa	Malaysia						
	A	Hamidreza Kia	Iran						
	A	Jordan A. Díaz	Cuba						
	A	Taeco O'Garro	Antigua and Barbuda						
	A	Wan Hanchen	China						
	A	Adir Gur	Ethiopia						
	A	Safin Wills	Jamaica						
	A	Arnovis Dalmero	Colombia						
	A	Vincent Kipkoech Kilel	Kenya						
	B	Owayne Owens	Jamaica						
	B	Frixon David Chila	Ecuador						
	B	Yusniel Jorrín	Cuba						
	B	Musyoka Mwema	Kenya						
	B	Marian Petre	Romania						
	B	Adrian Henrique Vieira	Brazil						
	B	Artem Konovalenko	Ukraine						
	B	Geiner Moreno	Colombia						
	B	Anaël-Thomas Gogois	France						
