= Arnovis Dalmero =

Colombian athlete

Personal information
- Full name: Arnovis de Jesús Dalmero Arvilla
- Born: 23 September 2000 (age 26) Ciénaga, Colombia
- Education: University of Magdalena
- Height: 1.79 m (5 ft 10 in)
- Weight: 73 kg (161 lb)

Sport
- Sport: Athletics
- Events: 60 metres; 100 metres; Long jump; Triple jump; 4×100 metres
- Coached by: Martín Suárez Mazenett

Achievements and titles
- Personal bests: 60 metres: 6.79 (2025); 100 metres: 10.32 (2021); Long jump: 8.20 m NR (2023); Triple jump: 16.52 m NU20R (2019); 4×100 metres: 39.65 (2021)
Medal record
Representing Colombia
Men's athletics
Event	1st	2nd	3rd
World U18 Championships	0	0	1
Pan American Games	1	0	0
Pan American Championships	0	1	0
Ibero-American Championships	1	1	0
CAC Games	0	0	1
South American Games	1	0	0
South American Championships	1	1	0
South American Indoor Championships	2	1	0
Bolivarian Games	1	0	0
South American U23 Championships	2	0	0
Total	9	4	2
Pan American Games
Gold medal – first place	2023 Santiago	Long jump
Pan American Championships
Silver medal – second place	2026 Medellín	Long jump
Ibero-American Championships
Gold medal – first place	2026 Lima	Long jump
Silver medal – second place	2024 Cuiabá	Long jump
Central American and Caribbean Games
Bronze medal – third place	2026 Santo Domingo	Long jump
South American Games
Gold medal – first place	2026 Santa Fe	Long jump
South American Championships
Gold medal – first place	2021 Guayaquil	Long jump
Silver medal – second place	2021 Guayaquil	4×100 m relay
South American Indoor Championships
Gold medal – first place	2024 Cochabamba	Long jump
Gold medal – first place	2025 Cochabamba	Long jump
Silver medal – second place	2026 Cochabamba	Long jump
Bolivarian Games
Gold medal – first place	2025 Lima-Ayacucho	Long jump
World U18 Championships
Bronze medal – third place	2017 Nairobi	Triple jump
South American U23 Championships
Gold medal – first place	2021 Guayaquil	Long jump
Gold medal – first place	2021 Guayaquil	4×100 m relay
South American U20 Championships
Gold medal – first place	2019 Cali	Triple jump
Silver medal – second place	2017 Leonora	Triple jump

Arnovis de Jesús Dalmero Arvilla (born 23 September 2000) is a Colombian athlete specialising in the long jump. He won a gold medal at the 2023 Pan American Games.

His personal bests in the event are 8.20 metres outdoors (+0.8 m/s, Bogotá 2023) and 8.16 metres indoors (Cochabamba 2024). Both are current national records.

== International competitions ==
Year	Competition	Venue	Position	Event	Result
Representing Colombia
2017	South American U20 Championships	Leonora, Guyana	2nd	Triple jump	15.64 m
2017	World U18 Championships	Nairobi, Kenya	3rd	Triple jump	15.89 m
2017	Bolivarian Games	Santa Marta, Colombia	7th	Long jump	7.35 m
2019	South American Championships	Lima, Peru	4th	Triple jump	15.86 m
2019	South American U20 Championships	Cali, Colombia	1st	Triple jump	16.52 m CR, NU20R
2020	South American Indoor Championships	Cochabamba, Bolivia	6th	60 m	6.90 s
2020	South American Indoor Championships	Cochabamba, Bolivia	4th	Long jump	7.68 m
2021	South American Championships	Guayaquil, Ecuador	2nd	4 × 100 m relay	39.65 s
2021	South American Championships	Guayaquil, Ecuador	1st	Long jump	7.94 m
2021	South American U23 Championships	Guayaquil, Ecuador	9th (h)	100 m	10.75 s
2021	South American U23 Championships	Guayaquil, Ecuador	1st	4 × 100 m relay	39.90 s
2021	South American U23 Championships	Guayaquil, Ecuador	1st	Long jump	8.04 m
2021	Junior Pan American Games (U23)	Cali, Colombia	—N/a	4 × 100 m relay	DQ
2021	Junior Pan American Games (U23)	Cali, Colombia	4th	Long jump	7.79 m
2021	Junior Pan American Games (U23)	Cali, Colombia	4th	Triple jump	15.90 m
2022	Bolivarian Games	Valledupar, Colombia	—N/a	Long jump	NM
2022	South American Games	Asunción Paraguay	4th	Long jump	7.63 m
2023	South American Championships	São Paulo, Brazil	—N/a	Long jump	DQ
2023	Pan American Games	Santiago, Chile	1st	Long jump	8.08 m
2024	South American Indoor Championships	Cochabamba, Bolivia	1st	Long jump	8.06 m
2024	World Indoor Championships	Glasgow, United Kingdom	—N/a	Long jump	NM
2024	Ibero-American Championships	Cuiabá, Brazil	2nd	Long jump	7.97 m
2024	Olympic Games	Paris, France	11th	Long jump	7.83 m
2025	South American Indoor Championships	Cochabamba, Bolivia	1st	Long jump	7.96 m
2025	South American Championships	Mar del Plata, Argentina	4th	Long jump	7.64 m w
2025	World Championships	Tokyo, Japan	31st (q)	Long jump	7.59 m
2025	Bolivarian Games	Lima, Peru	1st	Long jump	7.88 m
2026	South American Indoor Championships	Cochabamba, Bolivia	2nd	Long jump	7.88 m
2026	Ibero-American Championships	Lima, Peru	1st	Long jump	7.97 m w
2026	Pan American Championships	Medellín, Colombia	2nd	Long jump	7.97 m
2026	Central American and Caribbean Games	Santo Domingo, Dominican Republic	3rd	Long jump	7.82 m
2026	South American Games	Santa Fe, Argentina	1st	Long jump	7.96 m
