= Martina Weil =

Chilean sprinter (born 1999)

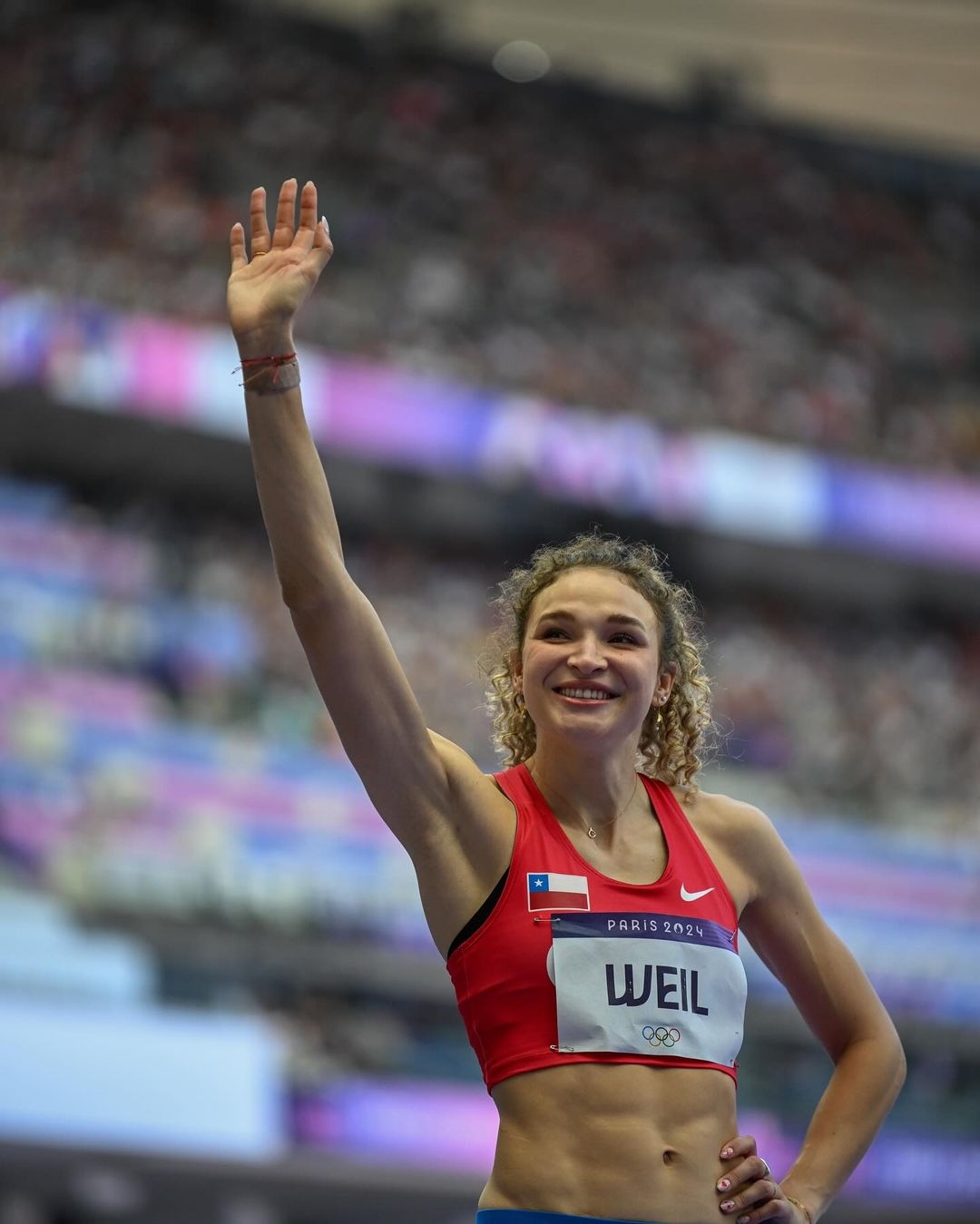

Personal information
- Full name: Martina Weil Restrepo
- Nationality: Chile
- Born: 12 July 1999 (age 27)
- Height: 1.85 m (6 ft 1 in)

Sport
- Sport: Athletics
- Events: 100 metres; 200 metres; 400 metres; 4 × 100 metres relay; 4 × 400 metres relay

Achievements and titles
- Personal bests: 100 m: 12.10 (Santiago, 2017); 200 m: 22.91 NR (Santiago, 2025); 400 m: 49.72 NR (Zurich, 2025); 4×100 m: 44.19 NR (Santiago, 2023); 4×400 m: 3:30.17 (Jacksonville, 2019)
Medal record
Representing Chile
Women's athletics
Event	1st	2nd	3rd
Pan American Games	1	1	0
South American Games	1	2	1
South American Championships	2	1	3
Bolivarian Games	0	2	0
Junior Pan American Games	0	2	0
South American U23 Championships	1	2	2
Total	5	10	6
Pan American Games
Gold medal – first place	2023 Santiago	400 m
Silver medal – second place	2023 Santiago	4×100 m relay
South American Games
Gold medal – first place	2026 Santa Fe	400 m
Silver medal – second place	2018 Cochabamba	4×400 m relay
Silver medal – second place	2022 Asunción	400 m
Bronze medal – third place	2022 Asunción	4×400 m relay
South American Championships
Gold medal – first place	2023 São Paulo	400 m
Gold medal – first place	2025 Mar del Plata	400 m
Silver medal – second place	2021 Guayaquil	4×400 m relay
Bronze medal – third place	2017 Asunción	4×400 m relay
Bronze medal – third place	2023 São Paulo	4×400 m relay
Bronze medal – third place	2025 Mar del Plata	4×400 m relay
Bolivarian Games
Silver medal – second place	2022 Valledupar	400 m
Silver medal – second place	2022 Valledupar	4×400 m relay
Junior Pan American Games
Silver medal – second place	2021 Cali-Valle	400 m
Silver medal – second place	2021 Cali-Valle	4×400 m relay
South American U23 Championships
Gold medal – first place	2018 Cuenca	400 m
Silver medal – second place	2018 Cuenca	4×100 m relay
Silver medal – second place	2021 Guayaquil	4×400 m relay
Bronze medal – third place	2021 Guayaquil	400 m
Bronze medal – third place	2021 Guayaquil	4×100 m relay

Martina Weil Restrepo (born 12 July 1999) is a Chilean track and field athlete who competes as a sprinter. She is the Chilean national record holder over 400 metres indoors and outdoors.

== Early life ==
Weil was trained at the Villa María Academy where she was coached by her Olympic medal winning mother Ximena Restrepo, before relocating to Belgium.

== Career ==
Weil became Chile's u20 national champion in the 100 metres and 200 meters at 18 years-old. At the Junior Pan American Games, in Cali in 2021, she finished second in the 400 metres with a time of 52.35, behind the Fiordaliza Cofil.

From 2019 to 2021, she competed for the University of Tennessee.

In May 2023, Weil broke the Chilean national record for the 400 metres, and then proceeded to lower it twice more before clocking 51.07 at the Diamond League event in Silesia, Poland in July 2023.

In November 2023, Weil won a gold medal in the 400 meters Pan American Games event in Santiago, Chile, 32 years after her mother claimed silver. At the same championships she was part of a Chilean team who set a new national record for the women's 4 × 100 m relay to secure a silver medal.

In July 2024, she lowered her own national 400 metres record to 51.05 seconds in Hengelo. She competed at the 2024 Summer Olympics over 400 metres in August 2024.

Competing in Karlsruhe on 7 February 2025 she improved the Chilean indoor record over 400 metres to 52.40. She lowered it again the following month, running 51.67 seconds to qualify for the final of the 400 metres at the 2025 World Athletics Indoor Championships in Nanjing.

In May 2025, she lowered the Chilean national record to 50.56 seconds in Santiago to move to fourth on the South American all-time list. Weil had already broken the Chilean record for the 200 meters two days earlier running 22.91 seconds, also in Santiago. She lowered her 400 personal best to 50.39 seconds in June 2025 in Stockholm at the 2025 BAUHAUS-galan event, part of the 2025 Diamond League. She lowered it again later that month when she ran 49.83 seconds to finish third at the 2025 Meeting de Paris. She placed fourth in a national record 49.72 seconds for the 400 metres at the Diamond League Final in Zurich on 28 August.

She was a semi-finalist at the 2025 World Athletics Championships in Tokyo in the women's 400 metres.

On 16 May 2026, Weil placed sixth with a time of 51.06 seconds for the 400 metres at the 2026 Shanghai Diamond League. On 19 June, she placed fifth with 51.05 seconds at the 2026 Doha Diamond League and on 3 July, placed sixth at the 2026 Prefontaine Classic in 50.75. In September, she was a finalist over 400 m at the inaugural World Ultimate Championship in Budapest, placing fifth overall. Weil won the 400 metres at the 2026 South American Games, running 50.45 seconds to improve the 32-year-old Games record set by her mother, Ximena Restrepo.

== Personal life ==
She is the daughter of former Olympians; sprinter and Olympic bronze medalist Ximena Restrepo and shot putter Gert Weil. She is in a relationship with Brazilian hurdler Alison dos Santos.

== International competitions ==
Year	Competition	Venue	Position	Event	Notes
Representing Chile
2017	South American Championships	Asunción, Paraguay	11th (h)	400 m	57.00 s
2017	South American Championships	Asunción, Paraguay	4th	4 × 100 m relay	46.02 s
2017	South American Championships	Asunción, Paraguay	3rd	4 × 400 m relay	3:40.00
2018	South American Games	Cochabamba, Bolivia	2nd	4 × 400 m relay	3:33.42
2018	World U20 Championships	Tampere, Finland	23rd (h)	400 m	54.52 s
2018	Ibero-American Championships	Trujillo, Peru	5th	200 m	24.81 s
2018	Ibero-American Championships	Trujillo, Peru	5th	4 × 400 m relay	3:43.56
2018	South American U23 Championships	Cuenca, Ecuador	4th	200 m	23.78 s
2018	South American U23 Championships	Cuenca, Ecuador	1st	400 m	52.60 s
2018	South American U23 Championships	Cuenca, Ecuador	2nd	4 × 100 m relay	45.55 s
2018	South American U23 Championships	Cuenca, Ecuador	4th	4 × 400 m relay	3:44.82
2019	World Relays	Yokohama, Japan	6th (B)	4 × 400 m relay	3:33.54
2021	South American Championships	Guayaquil, Ecuador	2nd	4 × 400 m relay	3:34.89
2021	South American U23 Championships	Guayaquil, Ecuador	3rd	400 m	53.47 s
2021	South American U23 Championships	Guayaquil, Ecuador	3rd	4 × 100 m relay	46.06 s
2021	South American U23 Championships	Guayaquil, Ecuador	2nd	4 × 400 m relay	3:41.48
2021	Junior Pan American Games (U23)	Cali, Colombia	2nd	400 m	52.35 s
2021	Junior Pan American Games (U23)	Cali, Colombia	5th	4 × 100 m relay	45.10 s
2021	Junior Pan American Games (U23)	Cali, Colombia	2nd	4 × 400 m relay	3:38.24
2022	Ibero-American Championships	La Nucia, Spain	8th	400 m	53.03 s
2022	Bolivarian Games	Valledupar, Colombia	2nd	400 m	52.64 s
2022	Bolivarian Games	Valledupar, Colombia	2nd	4 × 400 m relay	3:36.98
2022	South American Games	Asunción, Paraguay	4th	200 m	23.48 s
2022	South American Games	Asunción, Paraguay	2nd	400 m	51.92 s
2022	South American Games	Asunción, Paraguay	3rd	4 × 400 m relay	3:37.58
2023	South American Championships	São Paulo, Brazil	4th	200 m	23.16 s
2023	South American Championships	São Paulo, Brazil	1st	400 m	51.11 s CR
2023	South American Championships	São Paulo, Brazil	3rd	4 × 400 m relay	3:35.39
2023	World Championships	Budapest, Hungary	24th (h)	400 m	51.35 s
2023	Pan American Games	Santiago, Chile	1st	400 m	51.48 s
2023	Pan American Games	Santiago, Chile	2nd	4 × 100 m relay	44.19 s NR
2023	Pan American Games	Santiago, Chile	6th	4 × 400 m relay	3:37.00
2024	Olympic Games	Paris, France	17th (sf)	400 m	51.79 s
2025	World Indoor Championships	Nanjing, China	4th	400 m	51.78 s
2025	South American Championships	Mar del Plata, Argentina	1st	400 m	51.14 s
2025	South American Championships	Mar del Plata, Argentina	3rd	4 × 400 m relay	3:37.64
2025	World Championships	Tokyo, Japan	9th (sf)	400 m	49.88 s
2026	World Ultimate Championship	Budapest, Hungary	5th	400 m	50.00 s
2026	South American Games	Santa Fe, Argentina	1st	400 m	50.45 s
2026	South American Games	Santa Fe, Argentina	4th	Mixed 4 × 400 m relay	3:18.36
