= Orangys Jiménez =

Venezuelan athlete

Personal information
- Born: 15 September 2001 (age 25)

Sport
- Sport: Athletics
Medal record
Men's athletics
Representing Venezuela
South American Games
Gold medal – first place	2026 Santa Fe	100 m
Gold medal – first place	2026 Santa Fe	200 m
Gold medal – first place	2026 Santa Fe	Mixed 4 x 100 m relay
Silver medal – second place	2022 Asunción	200 m
Central American and Caribbean Games
Bronze medal – third place	2026 Santo Domingo	200 m

Orangys Jiménez (born 15 September 2001) is a Venezuelan sprinter. She is the national record holder in the 100 metres and won the gold medal over the distance at the 2026 South American Games.

== Biography ==
From Sucre, she was born in Cumaná and competed in her childhood in swimming before focusing on athletics from the age of 11 years-old.

In October 2022, Jiménez won the silver medal in the 200 metres at the 2022 South American Games in Asuncion, Paraguay. That month, she won the bronze medal at the 2022 South American U23 Championships in Cascavel with a time of 23.27 seconds.

In May 2026, she set a new national record of 11.19 seconds in the 100 metres. She won both the 100 metres and 200 metres at the 2026 national championships, winning the 200 m in a personal best 23.00 seconds. In August, she won the bronze medal in the 200 metres at the 2026 CAC Games in Santo Domingo, Dominican Republic, with a new personal best of 22.92 seconds. In September, Jiménez won gold medals in both the 100 metres and mixed 4 x 100 metres at the 2026 South American Games.
