= Erik Cardoso =

Brazilian sprinter (born 2000)

Personal information
- Full name: Erik Felipe Barbosa Cardoso
- Born: March 3, 2000 (age 26) Piracicaba, Brazil
- Education: UNIP Anchieta

Sport
- Sport: Athletics
- Events: 60 metres, 100 metres
- Coached by: Darci Ferreira da Silva
Medal record
Men's athletics
Representing Brazil
Pan American Games
Gold medal – first place	2023 Santiago	4 × 100 m

Erik Felipe Barbosa Cardoso (born 3 March 2000) is a Brazilian sprinter. He competed in the 60 metres at the 2022 World Indoor Championships without advancing from the first round. In addition, he has won multiple medals at regional level.

In July 2023, participating in the South American Games in São Paulo, Cardoso was the first Brazilian in history to run the 100 m under 10 seconds. He clocked a time of 9.97, breaking the Brazilian record for the event.

In July 2025, during South American qualifying for the 100-metres event at the 2025 World Athletics Championships, Cardoso broke the South American record, with a run of 9.93 seconds. The fastest time ever recorded in South America was 9.89 by Issamade Assinga of Suriname, but he lost the record due to a doping suspension.

In August 2025, he achieved a time of 9.88 s in the 100 m, which was not validated as a South American record due to the wind of 3.4, above the permitted limit.

== Personal bests ==
- 100 m: 9.93 (wind: +1.5 m/s) AR – (Brazil) São Paulo, 31 Jul 2025
- 100 m: 9.88 (wind: +3.4 m/s) – (Brazil) Bragança Paulista, 24 Aug 2025
- 200 m: 20.44 (wind: +0.8 m/s) – (Brazil) Cuiabá, 18 Sep 2022

Indoor

- 60 metres – 6.71 – (Bolivia) Cochabamba, 19 Feb 2022

== International competitions ==
Year	Competition	Venue	Position	Event	Notes
Representing Brazil
2017	World U18 Championships	Nairobi, Kenya	29th (h)	100 m	11.20
2019	South American Championships	Lima, Peru	5th	200 m	21.20
2019	South American Championships	Lima, Peru	2nd	4 × 100 meters relay	39.91
2019	South American U20 Championships	Cali, Colombia	1st	100 m	10.23
2019	South American U20 Championships	Cali, Colombia	4th (h)	200 m	21.87^{1}
2019	South American U20 Championships	Cali, Colombia	1st	4 × 100 meters relay	40.30
2019	Pan American U20 Championships	San José, Costa Rica	5th	100 m	10.39
2019	Pan American U20 Championships	San José, Costa Rica	19th (h)	200 m	21.97
2019	Pan American U20 Championships	San José, Costa Rica	3rd	4 × 100 meters relay	39.42
2019	Universiade	Naples, Italy	3rd (h)	4 × 100 meters relay	39.89
2021	South American Championships	Guayaquil, Ecuador	2nd (extra)	100 m	10.64
2021	South American Championships	Guayaquil, Ecuador	1st	4 × 100 meters relay	39.10
2021	South American U23 Championships	Guayaquil, Ecuador	1st	100 m	10.25
2021	South American U23 Championships	Guayaquil, Ecuador	–	4 × 100 meters relay	DQ
2021	Junior Pan American Games (U23)	Cali, Colombia	1st	100 m	10.33
2021	Junior Pan American Games (U23)	Cali, Colombia	1st	4 × 100 meters relay	39.21
2022	South American Indoor Championships	Cochabamba, Bolivia	4th	100 m	6.71
2022	World Indoor Championships	Belgrade, Serbia	34th (h)	60 m	6.73
2022	Ibero-American Championships	La Nucía, Spain	4th	100 m	10.32
2022	Ibero-American Championships	La Nucía, Spain	3rd	4 × 100 meters relay	39.32
2022	World Championships	Eugene, United States	14th (sf)	100 m	10.15
2022	World Championships	Eugene, United States	7th	4 × 100 m relay	38.25
2022	South American U23 Championships	Cascavel, Brazil	1st	100 m	10.08
2022	South American U23 Championships	Cascavel, Brazil	2nd	4 × 100 m relay	39.61
2022	South American Games	Asunción, Paraguay	–	4 × 100 m relay	DNF
2023	South American Championships	São Paulo, Brazil	1st	100 m	9.97
2023	South American Championships	São Paulo, Brazil	1st	4 × 100 m relay	38.70
2023	World Championships	Budapest, Hungary	43rd (h)	100 m	10.36
2023	World Championships	Budapest, Hungary	8th (h)	4 × 100 m relay	38.19^{2}
2023	Pan American Games	Santiago, Chile	4th	100 m	10.36
2023	Pan American Games	Santiago, Chile	1st	4 × 100 m relay	38.68
2024	South American Indoor Championships	Cochabamba, Bolivia	7th	60 m	6.84
2024	World Indoor Championships	Glasgow, United Kingdom	35th (h)	60 m	6.87
2024	Ibero-American Championships	Cuiabá, Brazil	4th	100 m	10.29
2024	Ibero-American Championships	Cuiabá, Brazil	3rd	200 m	20.50
2024	Ibero-American Championships	Cuiabá, Brazil	1st	4 × 100 m relay	39.19
2024	Olympic Games	Paris, France	51st (h)	100 m	10.35
2024	Olympic Games	Paris, France	14th (h)	4 × 100 m relay	38.73
2025	South American Indoor Championships	Cochabamba, Bolivia	11th (h)	60 m	6.80
2025	South American Championships	Mar del Plata, Argentina	5th	100 m	10.31
2025	South American Championships	Mar del Plata, Argentina	2nd	4 × 100 m relay	39.62
2025	World Championships	Tokyo, Japan	41st (h)	100 m	10.32
2026	South American Indoor Championships	Cochabamba, Bolivia	3rd	60 m	6.62
2026	World Indoor Championships	Toruń, Poland	20th (sf)	60 m	6.66
2026	Ibero-American Championships	Lima, Peru	4th	100 m	10.23
2026	South American Games	Santa Fe, Argentina	7th (h)	100 m	10.60^{2}

^{1} Did not start in the final

^{2} Disqualified in the final
