= Athletics at the South American Games =

Athletics competitions have been held at the quadrennial South American Games since the inaugural edition of the Southern Cross Games in 1978 in La Paz, Bolivia.

== Editions ==
Games	Year	Host city	Country	Events		
Games	Year	Host city	Country	Men	Women	Mixed
I	1978	La Paz	Bolivia	22	13	—
II	1982	Santa Fe	Argentina	23	16	—
III	1986	Santiago	Chile	23	17	—
IV	1990	Lima	Peru	23	19	—
V	1994	Valencia	Venezuela	24	19	—
VI	1998	Cuenca	Ecuador	24	21	—
VII	2002	Belém	Brazil	22	22	—
VIII	2006	Buenos Aires	Argentina	22	22	—
IX	2010	Medellín	Colombia	21	21	—
X	2014	Santiago	Chile	22	22	—
XI	2018	Cochabamba	Bolivia	23	22	—
XII	2022	Asunción	Paraguay	24	24	1
XIII	2026	Santa Fe	Argentina	22	20	2

== Medals ==
Medal winners for the South American Games were published in a book by written Argentinian journalist Ernesto Rodríguez III with support of the Argentine Olympic Committee (Spanish: Comité Olímpico Argentino) under the auspices of the Ministry of Education (Spanish: Ministerio de Educación de la Nación) in collaboration with the Office of Sports (Spanish: Secretaría de Deporte de la Nación). Eduardo Biscayart supplied the list of winners in athletics and their results.

== See also ==
List of South American Games records in athletics
