= List of Bolivarian Games records in athletics =

Bolivarian Games records in athletics are set by athletes competing from a range of member nations of the Organización Deportiva Bolivariana commonly known as ODEBO.

The Bolivarian Games is a quadrennial event which began in 1938. The Games records in athletics are set by athletes who are representing one of the ODEBO's member federations. The following list of records is assembled from Athletics Weekly and from sources compiled in the Athletics at the 2009 Bolivarian Games webpage.

There is no information on wind and/or heats for early competitions.

== Men's records ==
Event	Record	Athlete	Nationality	Date	Meet	Place	Ref.
100 m	10.13 (+1.6 m/s)	Álex Quiñónez	Ecuador	21 November 2017	2017 Games	Santa Marta, Colombia	
200 m	20.27 (+1.3 m/s) NR	Álex Quiñónez	Ecuador	22 November 2017	2017 Games	Santa Marta, Colombia	
400 m	45.43 A	Fernando Acevedo	Peru	18 October 1977	1977 Games	La Paz, Bolivia	
800 m	1:45.14	Rafith Rodríguez	Colombia	26 November 2013	2013 Games	Trujillo, Peru	
1500 m	3:42.91	Carlos San Martín	Colombia	1 July 2022	2022 Games	Valledupar, Colombia	
5000 m	13:41.34	José Luis Rojas	Peru	4 December 2025	2025 Games	Lima, Peru	
10,000 m	28:42.66	Walter Nina	Peru	2 December 2025	2025 Games	Lima, Peru	
Half marathon	1:06:34	Rafael Loza	Ecuador	5 July 2022	2022 Games	Valledupar, Colombia	
110 m hurdles	13.44 A	Paulo Villar	Colombia	August 2005	2005 Games	Armenia, Colombia	
400 m hurdles	50.05	Juander Santos	Dominican Republic	4 July 2022	2022 Games	Valledupar, Colombia	
3000 m steeplechase	8:26.6 h	José Peña	Venezuela	27 November 2013	2013 Games	Trujillo, Peru	
High jump	2.26 m A	Gilmar Mayo	Colombia	August 2005	2005 Games	Armenia, Colombia	
Pole vault	5.40 m	Dyander Pacho	Ecuador	5 July 2022	2022 Games	Valledupar, Colombia	
Long jump	8.25 m A	Víctor Castillo	Venezuela	November 2009	2009 Games	Sucre, Bolivia	
Triple jump	17.03 m (+0.3 m/s) A	Hugo Chila	Ecuador	November 2009	2009 Games	Sucre, Bolivia	
Shot put	19.44 m A	Yojer Medina	Venezuela	15 September 2001	2001 Games	Ambato, Ecuador	
Discus throw	61.43 m	Juan José Caicedo	Ecuador	4 December 2025	2025 Games	Lima, Peru	
Hammer throw	67.63 m A	Aldo Bello	Venezuela	August 2005	2005 Games	Armenia, Colombia	
Javelin throw	81.99 m	Billy Julio	Colombia	5 December 2025	2025 Games	Lima, Peru	
Decathlon	8089 pts NR	Julio Angulo	Colombia	1–2 December 2025	2025 Games	Lima, Peru	
Decathlon	100m / Long jump / Shot put / High jump / 400m / 110m H / Discus / Pole vault / Javelin / 1500m; 10.80 (−0.3 m/s) / 7.37 m (+0.1 m/s) / 14.26 m / 2.02 m / 48.15 / 14.32 (+0.7 m/s) / 48.39 m / 4.50 m / 58.01 m / 4:57.79						
20 km walk	1:22:51 A	Rolando Saquipay	Ecuador	August 2005	2005 Games	Armenia, Colombia	
Half marathon walk	1:25:39	Jordy Jiménez	Ecuador	29 November 2025	2025 Games	Lima, Peru	
35 km walk	2:43:43	César Rodríguez	Peru	2 July 2022	2022 Games	Valledupar, Colombia	
Marathon walk	3:15:49	César Herrera	Colombia	6 December 2025	2025 Games	Lima, Peru	
4 × 100 m relay	38.73	Ronal Longa; Enoc Moreno; Pedro Agualimpia; Deiner Guaitoto	Colombia	3 December 2025	2025 Games	Lima, Peru	
4 × 400 m relay	3:04.00	Axel Gómez; Javier Gómez; José Antonio Maita; Kelvis Padrino	Venezuela	5 December 2025	2025 Games	Lima, Peru	

Key:
^{WR} World record	^{AR} South American record	^{NR} National record	^{A} affected by altitude

== Women's records ==
Event	Record	Athlete	Nationality	Date	Meet	Place	Ref.
100 m	11.14 (+0.9 m/s)	Ángela Tenorio	Ecuador	1 July 2022	2022 Games	Valledupar, Colombia	
200 m	22.85 A	Felipa Palacios	Colombia	August 2005	2005 Games	Armenia, Colombia	
400 m	51.83	Lina Licona	Colombia	3 December 2025	2025 Games	Lima, Peru	
800 m	2:01.57 A	Rosibel García	Colombia	August 2005	2005 Games	Armenia, Colombia	
1500 m	4:09.75 NR	Rosibel García	Colombia	26 November 2013	2013 Games	Trujillo, Peru	
5000 m	15:30.63 NR	Inés Melchor	Peru	28 November 2013	2013 Games	Trujillo, Peru	
10,000 m	33:52.9	Inés Melchor	Peru	26 November 2013	2013 Games	Trujillo, Peru	
Half marathon	1:14:55	Gladys Tejeda	Peru	25 November 2017	2017 Games	Santa Marta, Colombia	
100 m hurdles	13.0 h A	Princesa Oliveros	Colombia	15 September 2001	2001 Games	Ambato, Ecuador	
100 m hurdles	13.07 (−0.2 m/s)	Yoveinny Mota	Venezuela	2 July 2022	2022 Games	Valledupar, Colombia	
400 m hurdles	55.32	Gianna Woodruff	Panama	4 July 2022	2022 Games	Valledupar, Colombia	
3000 m steeplechase	9:52.32 NR	Zulema Arenas	Peru	24 November 2017	2017 Games	Santa Marta, Colombia	
High jump	1.91 m A	Caterine Ibargüen	Colombia	August 2005	2005 Games	Armenia, Colombia	
Pole vault	4.21 m A	Milena Agudelo	Colombia	August 2005	2005 Games	Armenia, Colombia	
Long jump	6.95 m (−0.1 m/s) AU23R, NR	Natalia Linares	Colombia	1 December 2025	2025 Games	Lima, Peru	
Triple jump	14.08 m (+1.7 m/s)	Yosiris Urrutia	Colombia	27 November 2013	2013 Games	Trujillo, Peru	
Shot put	17.99 m	Natalia Duco	Chile	21 November 2017	2017 Games	Santa Marta, Colombia	
Discus throw	59.38 m	Karen Gallardo	Chile	4 July 2022	2022 Games	Valledupar, Colombia	
Hammer throw	73.36 m	Rosa Rodríguez	Venezuela	29 November 2013	2013 Games	Trujillo, Peru	
Javelin throw	62.48 m	Flor Ruiz	Colombia	24 November 2017	2017 Games	Santa Marta, Colombia	
Heptathlon	5975 pts	Martha Araújo	Colombia	3–4 July 2022	2022 Games	Valledupar, Colombia	
Heptathlon	100m H / High jump / Shot put / 200m / Long jump / Javelin / 800m; 13.53 (+0.3 m/s) / 1.67 m / 12.88 m / 25.22 (−0.5 m/s) / 6.27 m (+0.2 m/s) / 47.10 m / 2:22.72						
20 km walk	1:32:39	Sandra Arenas	Colombia	22 November 2017	2017 Games	Santa Marta, Colombia	
Half marathon walk	1:35:10	Kimberly García	Peru	29 November 2025	2025 Games	Lima, Peru	
35 km walk	2:59:54	Magaly Bonilla	Ecuador	2 July 2022	2022 Games	Valledupar, Colombia	
4 × 100 m relay	43.89 A	Mirtha Brock; Helena Guerrero; Patricia Rodríguez; Zandra Borrero	Colombia	22 October 1997	1997 Games	Arequipa, Peru	
4 × 400 m relay	3:34.10	Karla Vélez; Lina Licona; María Alejandra Rocha; Paola Loboa	Colombia	3 December 2025	2025 Games	Lima, Peru	

Key:
^{WR} World record	^{AR} South American record	^{NR} National record	^{A} affected by altitude

== Mixed records ==
Event	Record	Athlete	Nationality	Date	Meet	Place	Ref.
4 × 100 m relay	41.52 NR	Nicole Caicedo; Anahí Suárez; Katriel Angulo; Anderson Marquínez	Ecuador	1 December 2025	2025 Games	Lima, Peru	
4 × 400 m relay	3:19.50	Juander Santos; Mariana Pérez; Robert King; Anabel Medina	Dominican Republic	1 July 2022	2022 Games	Valledupar, Colombia	

== Records in defunct events ==
=== Men's events ===
Event	Record	Name	Nation	Date	Meet	Ref.
100 m	10.2 h	Fernando Acevedo	Peru	August 1970	1970 Games	
Marathon	2:23:07	Eduardo Castellanos	Venezuela	12 December 1981	1981 Games	
2000 m steeplechase	6:08.99 A	José Castillo	Peru	November 1985	1985 Games	
10 km walk (track)	46:24.1 A	Álvaro López	Colombia	November 1985	1985 Games	
50 km walk	3:58:50	Cristian Chocho	Ecuador	29 November 2013	2013 Games	
Pentathlon	3376 pts A	Héctor Thomas	Venezuela	November 1965	1965 Games	

=== Women's events ===
Event	Record	Name	Nation	Date	Meet	Ref.
50 m	6.5 h	Carlota Gooden	Panama	December 1951	1951 Games	
3000 m	9:49.71 A	Janeth Caizalitín	Ecuador	April 1993	1993 Games	
Marathon	3:06:06 A	Justina Calizaya	Bolivia	September 2001	2001 Games	
80 m hurdles	11.8 h A	Gisela Vidal	Venezuela	November 1965	1965 Games	
200 m hurdles	30.03 A	Adriana Martínez	Ecuador	November 1985	1985 Games	
Javelin throw (old model)	58.04 m A	Zuleima Araméndiz	Colombia	24 October 1997	1997 Games	
Pentathlon	4403 pts	Lucía Vaamonde	Venezuela	August 1970	1970 Games	
10,000 m walk (track)	46:15.2 h	Miriam Ramón	Ecuador	23 January 1989	1989 Games	
10,000 m walk (road)	48:33 A	Bertha Vera	Ecuador	April 1993	1993 Games	
