= Athletics at the 2025 Bolivarian Games – Results =

These are the full results of the athletics competition at the 2025 Bolivarian Games which took place between 23 November and 6 December 2025 at the VIDENA Stadium in Lima, Peru.

== Men's results ==
=== 100 metres ===
2 December
Wind: +0.1 m/s

Rank	Lane	Name	Nationality	Time	Notes
1st place, gold medalist(s)	5	Ronal Longa	Colombia	10.29	
2nd place, silver medalist(s)	4	David Vivas	Venezuela	10.43	
3rd place, bronze medalist(s)	6	Alexis Nieves	Venezuela	10.50	
4	1	Gustavo Mongelos	Paraguay	10.66	10.653
5	3	Carlos Flórez	Colombia	10.66	10.654
6	9	Jonathan Wolk	Paraguay	10.67	
7	7	Melbin Marcelino	Dominican Republic	10.70	
8	2	Julián Vargas	Bolivia	10.82	
9	8	Pablo Rodríguez	Peru	10.95	

=== 200 metres ===
Heats – 3 December
Wind:
Heat 1: -0.7 m/s, Heat 2: -0.1 m/s

Rank	Heat	Name	Nationality	Time	Notes
1	1	Katriel Angulo	Ecuador	20.34	Q
2	2	Ronal Longa	Colombia	20.67	Q
3	1	César Almirón	Paraguay	20.70	Q
4	1	Lidio Andrés Feliz	Dominican Republic	20.73	Q
5	1	Enoc Moreno	Colombia	20.95	q
6	2	Alexis Nieves	Venezuela	20.96	Q
7	2	Christopher Melenciano	Dominican Republic	21.01	Q
8	2	Anderson Marquínez	Ecuador	21.07	q
9	1	Julián Vargas	Bolivia	21.87	
10	2	Pablo Rodríguez	Peru	22.43	
	1	Rodrigo Cornejo	Peru	DQ	FS

Final – 4 December

Wind: -1.8 m/s

Rank	Lane	Name	Nationality	Time	Notes
1st place, gold medalist(s)	8	Katriel Angulo	Ecuador	20.63	
2nd place, silver medalist(s)	7	Ronal Longa	Colombia	20.83	
3rd place, bronze medalist(s)	6	César Almirón	Paraguay	20.99	
4	5	Lidio Andrés Feliz	Dominican Republic	21.10	
5	9	Alexis Nieves	Venezuela	21.21	
6	4	Christopher Melenciano	Dominican Republic	21.38	
7	2	Enoc Moreno	Colombia	21.45	
8	3	Anderson Marquínez	Ecuador	21.56	

=== 400 metres ===
Heats – 2 December

Rank	Heat	Name	Nationality	Time	Notes
1	2	Javier Gómez	Venezuela	46.06	Q
2	1	Kelvis Padrino	Venezuela	46.31	Q
3	1	Jeffrey Cajo	Peru	46.75	Q
4	1	Ian Andrey Pata	Ecuador	47.22	Q
5	1	Wilbert Encarnación	Dominican Republic	47.38	q
6	2	Anderson Marquínez	Ecuador	47.40	Q
7	2	Bernardo Baloyes	Colombia	47.45	Q
8	2	Rodrigo Cornejo	Peru	47.74	Q
9	2	Diosquendri Rojas	Dominican Republic	47.87	
10	1	Robert King	Dominican Republic	47.95	
	1	Luis Arrieta	Colombia	DNF	

Final – 3 December

Rank	Lane	Name	Nationality	Time	Notes
1st place, gold medalist(s)	7	Kelvis Padrino	Venezuela	45.71	
2nd place, silver medalist(s)	5	Javier Gómez	Venezuela	45.87	
3rd place, bronze medalist(s)	8	Anderson Marquínez	Ecuador	46.51	
4	3	Wilbert Encarnación	Dominican Republic	47.36	
5	2	Rodrigo Cornejo	Peru	48.26	
	4	Ian Andrey Pata	Ecuador	DQ	RT17.2.3
	6	Jeffrey Cajo	Peru	DQ	RT17.2.3
	9	Bernardo Baloyes	Colombia	DQ	RT17.2.3

=== 800 metres ===
4 December

Rank	Name	Nationality	Time	Notes
1st place, gold medalist(s)	Chamar Chambers	Panama	1:46.95	
2nd place, silver medalist(s)	José Antonio Maita	Venezuela	1:47.45	
3rd place, bronze medalist(s)	Rafael Muñoz	Chile	1:47.56	
4	Ryan López	Venezuela	1:47.96	
5	Ferdy Agramonte	Dominican Republic	1:48.64	
6	Giancarlo Bravo	Peru	1:49.65	
7	Leandro Daza	Bolivia	1:50.70	
8	Ramiro Ulunque	Bolivia	1:51.15	
9	Luis Peralta	Dominican Republic	1:52.52	

=== 1500 metres ===
3 December

Rank	Name	Nationality	Time	Notes
1st place, gold medalist(s)	Esteban González	Chile	3:49.78	
2nd place, silver medalist(s)	Luis Huaman	Peru	3:50.04	
3rd place, bronze medalist(s)	Juan Ignacio Peña	Chile	3:50.28	
4	Yeferson Cuno	Peru	3:50.45	
5	Luis Peralta	Dominican Republic	3:52.66	
6	Víctor Aguilar	Bolivia	3:53.21	

=== 5000 metres ===
4 December

Rank	Name	Nationality	Time	Notes
1st place, gold medalist(s)	José Luis Rojas	Peru	13:41.34	GR
2nd place, silver medalist(s)	Luis Masabanda	Ecuador	13:42.92	
3rd place, bronze medalist(s)	Diego Uribe	Chile	13:47.82	
4	Luis Chávez	Peru	14:28.80	
	Carlos San Martín	Colombia	DNS	

=== 10,000 metres ===
2 December

Rank	Name	Nationality	Time	Notes
1st place, gold medalist(s)	Walter Nina	Peru	28:42.66	GR
2nd place, silver medalist(s)	Carlos Díaz	Chile	28:53.08	
3rd place, bronze medalist(s)	Jhonatan Molina	Peru	28:55.58	
4	Luis Masabanda	Ecuador	29:02.18	
	Ignacio Velásquez	Chile	DNF	

=== Marathon ===
23 November

Rank	Name	Nationality	Time	Notes
1st place, gold medalist(s)	Ferdinan Cereceda	Peru	2:16:38	GR
2nd place, silver medalist(s)	Ulises Martín	Peru	2:16:41	
3rd place, bronze medalist(s)	Fernando Moreno	Ecuador	2:18:17	
4	Gualberto Castro	Bolivia	2:32:23	

=== 110 metres hurdles ===
4 December
Wind: -2.1 m/s

Rank	Lane	Name	Nationality	Time	Notes
1st place, gold medalist(s)	5	Marcos Herrera	Ecuador	13.97	
2nd place, silver medalist(s)	4	Yohan Chaverra	Colombia	14.18	
3rd place, bronze medalist(s)	6	Cristián Rodríguez	Dominican Republic	14.39	

=== 400 metres hurdles ===
1 December

Rank	Lane	Name	Nationality	Time	Notes
1st place, gold medalist(s)	6	Yeral Núñez	Dominican Republic	50.81	
2nd place, silver medalist(s)	8	Sebastián Mosquera	Colombia	51.53	
3rd place, bronze medalist(s)	4	Ian Andrey Pata	Ecuador	51.62	
4	7	Ramón Fuenzalida	Chile	52.83	
5	5	Juander Santos	Dominican Republic	52.84	
6	9	Luis Elespuru	Peru	54.15	
7	3	Paolo Medrano	Peru	55.22	

=== 3000 metres steeplechase ===
5 December

Rank	Name	Nationality	Time	Notes
1st place, gold medalist(s)	Carlos San Martín	Colombia	8:38.27	
2nd place, silver medalist(s)	Diddier Rodríguez	Panama	8:43.29	
3rd place, bronze medalist(s)	Víctor Aguilar	Bolivia	9:08.19	
4	Yeferson Cuno	Peru	9:35.02	
5	Lizardo Huamani	Peru	9:41.27	

=== 4 × 100 metres relay ===
3 December

Rank	Lane	Team	Name	Time	Notes
1st place, gold medalist(s)	5	Colombia	Deiner Guaitoto, Enoc Moreno, Pedro Agualimpia, Ronal Longa	38.73	GR
2nd place, silver medalist(s)	6	Dominican Republic	Christopher Melenciano, Lidio Andrés Feliz, Melbin Marcelino, Yancarlos Martínez	39.20	
3rd place, bronze medalist(s)	8	Venezuela	Alexis Nieves, Ángel Alvarado, David Vivas, Eubrig Maza	39.31	
4	7	Paraguay	César Almirón, Fredy Maidana, Gustavo Mongelós, Jonathan Wolk	39.54	
5	4	Ecuador	Anderson Marquínez, Ian Andrey Pata, Katriel Angulo, Marcos Herrera	40.37	

=== 4 × 400 metres relay ===
4 December

Rank	Lane	Team	Name	Time	Notes
1st place, gold medalist(s)	6	Venezuela	Axel Gómez, Javier Gómez, José Antonio Maita, Kelvis Padrino	3:04.00	GR
2nd place, silver medalist(s)	3	Ecuador	Anderson Marquínez, Francisco Tejeda, Ian Andrey Pata, Katriel Angulo	3:06.07	NR
3rd place, bronze medalist(s)	5	Dominican Republic	Christopher Melenciano, Lidio Andrés Feliz, Wilbert Encarnación, Yeral Núñez	3:06.52	
4	4	Colombia	Bernardo Baloyes, Daniel Balanta, Julio Angulo, Sebastián Mosquera	3:11.22	
	7	Peru	Fabritzio Moreno, Jeffrey Cajo, Marco Vilca, Rodrigo Cornejo	DNF	

=== Half marathon walk ===
29 November

Rank	Name	Nationality	Time	Notes
1st place, gold medalist(s)	Jordy Jiménez	Ecuador	1:25:39	GR, NR
2nd place, silver medalist(s)	Luis Henry Campos	Peru	1:26:08	NR
3rd place, bronze medalist(s)	Éider Arévalo	Colombia	1:26:39	NR
4	Saúl Wamputsrik	Ecuador	1:32:04	
5	Jeferson Chacón	Venezuela	1:35:59	
6	Bernardo Barrondo	Guatemala	1:36:40	
7	Jaime Ccanto	Peru	1:39:43	
8	José Ortiz	Guatemala	1:40:58	

=== Marathon walk ===
6 December

Rank	Name	Nationality	Time	Notes
1st place, gold medalist(s)	César Herrera	Colombia	3:15:49	GR, NR
2nd place, silver medalist(s)	Luis Henry Campos	Peru	3:17:09	NR
3rd place, bronze medalist(s)	Erick Barrondo	Guatemala	3:18:41	
4	Oscar Patín	Ecuador	3:23:52	
	Josias Cruzado	Peru	DQ	
	Yassir Cabrera	Panama	DNF	

=== Pole vault ===
4 December

Rank	Name	Nationality	4.70	4.90	5.10	5.20	5.30	Result	Notes
1st place, gold medalist(s)	Ricardo Montes de Oca	Venezuela	–	–	o	o	xxx	5.20	
2nd place, silver medalist(s)	Cristóbal Núñez	Chile	–	xo	o	o	xxx	5.20	
3rd place, bronze medalist(s)	Guillermo Correa	Chile	–	o	xxx			4.90	
	Dyander Pacho	Ecuador	xr					NM	

=== Long jump ===
2 December

Rank	Name	Nationality	#1	#2	#3	#4	#5	#6	Result	Notes
1st place, gold medalist(s)	Arnovis Dalmero	Colombia	7.71	7.53	7.78	7.70	7.71	7.88	7.88	
2nd place, silver medalist(s)	José Luis Mandros	Peru	7.45	x	7.65	x	x	7.87	7.87	
3rd place, bronze medalist(s)	Eubrig Maza	Venezuela	7.50	7.47	7.36	x	7.69	7.36	7.69	
4	Jhon Berrío	Colombia	7.41	6.22	7.63	7.44	7.51	7.64	7.64	
5	Vicente Belgeri	Chile	x	x	7.34	7.15	x	x	7.34	
6	Erick Suárez	Bolivia	x	6.75	x	6.98	7.00	6.85	7.00	
7	Ángel Daniel Solis	Peru	6.32	6.32	6.31	4.44	6.23	5.85	6.32	

=== Triple jump ===
5 December

Rank	Name	Nationality	#1	#2	#3	#4	#5	#6	Result	Notes
1st place, gold medalist(s)	Leodan Torrealba	Venezuela	16.53	x	16.59	16.27	x	x	16.59	
2nd place, silver medalist(s)	Geiner Moreno	Colombia	15.87	15.73	16.23	16.39	x	15.35	16.39	
3rd place, bronze medalist(s)	Wuilliam Landinez	Venezuela	15.85	x	x	16.14	15.86	15.82	16.14	
	José Luis Mandros	Peru							DNS	

=== Shot put ===
2 December

Rank	Name	Nationality	#1	#2	#3	#4	#5	#6	Result	Notes
1st place, gold medalist(s)	Ronald Grueso	Colombia	17.72	x	17.99	19.13	x	18.40	19.13	PB
2nd place, silver medalist(s)	Matías Puschel	Chile	17.52	18.19	x	18.06	18.47	x	18.47	
3rd place, bronze medalist(s)	Jhon Zea	Colombia	18.27	x	18.12	x	17.98	18.41	18.41	
4	Joaquín Ballivián	Chile	16.69	16.73	17.33	16.92	17.16	16.93	17.33	
5	Gian Piero Ragonesi	Peru	x	13.72	15.12	16.36	x	15.45	16.36	
6	Luis Humberto Fossa	Peru	14.56	15.62	15.20	x	14.98	15.89	15.89	

=== Discus throw ===
4 December

Rank	Name	Nationality	#1	#2	#3	#4	#5	#6	Result	Notes
1st place, gold medalist(s)	Juan José Caicedo	Ecuador	59.57	59.49	x	61.43	x	61.33	61.43	GR
2nd place, silver medalist(s)	Claudio Romero	Chile	57.96	x	59.71	x	x	59.51	59.71	
3rd place, bronze medalist(s)	Lucas Nervi	Chile	59.65	57.13	57.30	57.45	57.45	56.40	59.65	
4	Juan David Montaño	Colombia	52.73	x	x	50.39	x	x	52.73	
5	Gian Piero Ragonesi	Peru	46.08	46.76	45.71	48.52	x	x	48.52	
6	Luis Humberto Fossa	Peru	x	46.92	47.14	x	x	x	47.14	

=== Javelin throw ===
5 December

Rank	Name	Nationality	#1	#2	#3	#4	#5	#6	Result	Notes
1st place, gold medalist(s)	Billy Julio	Colombia	79.68	76.84	80.53	76.14	81.99	78.15	81.99	GR, PB
2nd place, silver medalist(s)	Lars Flaming	Paraguay	74.36	x	x	79.28	78.45	x	79.28	
3rd place, bronze medalist(s)	Carlos Rospigliosi	Peru	64.78	66.00	62.75	60.94	x	63.84	66.00	

=== Decathlon ===
1–2 December

The highest mark recorded in each event is highlighted in yellow

Rank	Name	Nationality	100m	LJ	SP	HJ	400m	110m H	DT	PV	JT	1500m	Points	Notes
1st place, gold medalist(s)	Julio Angulo	Colombia	10.80	7.37	14.26	2.02	48.15	14.32	48.39	4.50	58.01	4:57.79	8089	GR, NR
2nd place, silver medalist(s)	Gerson Izaguirre	Venezuela	11.07	7.13	14.03	1.96	50.06	14.04	42.59	4.60	62.89	5:03.17	7798	
3rd place, bronze medalist(s)	Carlos Córdoba	Venezuela	11.15	6.97	13.54	1.90	49.12	16.16	39.14	4.50	62.76	4:40.13	7484	
	Andy Preciado	Ecuador	11.16	7.00	15.43	2.02	51.77	14.25	NM	4.50	58.26	DNF	6426	

== Women's results ==
=== 100 metres ===
Heats – 1 December
Wind:
Heat 1: -1.6 m/s, Heat 2: -0.3 m/s

Rank	Heat	Name	Nationality	Time	Notes
1	2	Anahí Suárez	Ecuador	11.52	Q
2	1	Liranyi Alonso	Dominican Republic	11.59	Q
3	2	Patricia Sine	Dominican Republic	11.63	Q
4	2	Angélica Gamboa	Colombia	11.71	Q
5	1	Ángela Tenorio	Ecuador	11.72	Q
6	1	Marlet Ospino	Colombia	11.76	Q
7	2	Macarena Giménez	Paraguay	11.80	q
8	1	Xenia Hierbert	Paraguay	11.84	q
9	1	Paula Daruich	Peru	11.86	
10	2	Cayetana Chirinos	Peru	11.95	
11	2	Leticia Arispe	Bolivia	12.11	
12	1	Guadalupe Torrez	Bolivia	12.12	
13	1	Orangys Jiménez	Venezuela	12.17	

Final – 2 December

Wind: -0.3 m/s

Rank	Lane	Name	Nationality	Time	Notes
1st place, gold medalist(s)	4	Liranyi Alonso	Dominican Republic	11.40	
2nd place, silver medalist(s)	6	Ángela Tenorio	Ecuador	11.61	11.608
3rd place, bronze medalist(s)	5	Anahí Suárez	Ecuador	11.61	11.610
4	7	Patricia Sine	Dominican Republic	11.67	
5	3	Marlet Ospino	Colombia	11.74	
6	8	Angélica Gamboa	Colombia	11.77	
7	2	Macarena Giménez	Paraguay	11.78	
8	9	Xenia Hierbert	Paraguay	12.01	

=== 200 metres ===
Heats – 3 December
Wind:
Heat 1: -1.2 m/s, Heat 2: +0.8 m/s

Rank	Heat	Name	Nationality	Time	Notes
1	1	Nicole Caicedo	Ecuador	23.08	Q
2	2	Anahí Suárez	Ecuador	23.20	Q
3	1	María Maturana	Colombia	23.51	Q
4	2	Marlet Ospino	Colombia	23.76	Q
5	1	Orangys Jiménez	Venezuela	24.03	Q
6	2	Cristal Cuervo	Panama	24.04	Q
7	1	Milagros Durán	Dominican Republic	24.38	q
8	2	Cayetana Chirinos	Peru	24.58	q
9	1	Leticia Arispe	Bolivia	24.85	
10	2	Alinny Delgadillo	Bolivia	25.41	
11	1	Jimena Reyes	Peru	25.94	

Final – 4 December

Wind: -0.4 m/s

Rank	Lane	Name	Nationality	Time	Notes
1st place, gold medalist(s)	6	Nicole Caicedo	Ecuador	23.09	
2nd place, silver medalist(s)	7	Anahí Suárez	Ecuador	23.32	
3rd place, bronze medalist(s)	8	María Maturana	Colombia	23.55	
4	9	Cristal Cuervo	Panama	23.86	
5	2	Milagros Durán	Dominican Republic	24.41	
6	3	Cayetana Chirinos	Peru	24.53	
	4	Marlet Ospino	Colombia	DQ	TR17.2.3
	5	Orangys Jiménez	Venezuela	DNS	

=== 400 metres ===
Heats – 2 December

Rank	Heat	Name	Nationality	Time	Notes
1	1	Lina Licona	Colombia	52.88	Q
2	2	Estrella de Aza	Dominican Republic	54.44	Q
3	1	Génesis Cañola	Ecuador	54.60	Q
4	1	Cristal Cuervo	Panama	54.74	Q
5	1	Bianca Acosta	Dominican Republic	55.17	q
6	2	Paola Loboa	Colombia	55.36	Q
7	2	Wilismar Padrón	Venezuela	55.70	Q
8	2	Evelin Mercado	Ecuador	55.80	q
9	2	Lucía Sotomayor	Bolivia	56.84	
10	1	Isabel Quiroz	Peru	57.22	
11	2	Catalina Yzaga	Peru	57.80	
12	1	Mariana Arce	Bolivia	58.81	

Final – 3 December

Rank	Lane	Name	Nationality	Time	Notes
1st place, gold medalist(s)	5	Lina Licona	Colombia	51.83	GR
2nd place, silver medalist(s)	4	Cristal Cuervo	Panama	53.96	
3rd place, bronze medalist(s)	7	Génesis Cañola	Ecuador	54.04	
4	6	Estrella de Aza	Dominican Republic	54.10	
5	8	Paola Loboa	Colombia	54.14	
6	3	Bianca Acosta	Dominican Republic	54.65	
	2	Evelin Mercado	Ecuador	DNF	
	9	Wilismar Padrón	Venezuela	DNF	

=== 800 metres ===
1 December

Rank	Name	Nationality	Time	Notes
1st place, gold medalist(s)	Berdine Castillo	Chile	2:03.54	
2nd place, silver medalist(s)	Karla Vélez	Colombia	2:04.81	
3rd place, bronze medalist(s)	Valeria Cabezas	Colombia	2:04.85	PB
4	Valentina Barrientos	Chile	2:05.10	
5	María Celeste Rojas	Venezuela	2:07.69	
6	Pamela Barreto	Ecuador	2:09.03	
7	Anita Poma	Peru	2:10.89	
8	Cecilia Gómez	Bolivia	2:17.90	

=== 1500 metres ===
4 December

Rank	Name	Nationality	Time	Notes
1st place, gold medalist(s)	Anita Poma	Peru	4:19.62	
2nd place, silver medalist(s)	Javiera Faletto	Chile	4:21.53	
3rd place, bronze medalist(s)	Veronica Huacasi	Peru	4:22.70	
4	Lilian Mateo	Bolivia	4:48.11	

=== 5000 metres ===
5 December

Rank	Name	Nationality	Time	Notes
1st place, gold medalist(s)	Edymar Brea	Venezuela	16:08.45	
2nd place, silver medalist(s)	Benita Parra	Bolivia	16:08.95	
3rd place, bronze medalist(s)	Saida Meneses	Peru	16:09.61	
4	Jazmín Matos	Peru	16:14.12	
	Javiera Faletto	Chile	DNF	

=== 10,000 metres ===
1 December

Rank	Name	Nationality	Time	Notes
1st place, gold medalist(s)	Edymar Brea	Venezuela	35:00.47	
2nd place, silver medalist(s)	Thalia Valdivia	Peru	35:00.86	
3rd place, bronze medalist(s)	Saida Meneses	Peru	35:02.11	
4	Benita Parra	Bolivia	35:03.25	

=== Marathon ===
23 November

Rank	Name	Nationality	Time	Notes
1st place, gold medalist(s)	Silvia Ortiz	Ecuador	2:34:54	GR
2nd place, silver medalist(s)	Sheyla Eulogio	Peru	2:35:10	
3rd place, bronze medalist(s)	Zarita Suárez	Peru	2:36:07	
4	Edith Mamani	Bolivia	2:57:29	

=== 100 metres hurdles ===
2 December
Wind: -1.3 m/s

Rank	Lane	Name	Nationality	Time	Notes
1st place, gold medalist(s)	6	Martha Araújo	Colombia	13.40	
2nd place, silver medalist(s)	4	Maribel Caicedo	Ecuador	13.44	
3rd place, bronze medalist(s)	5	María Alejandra Rocha	Colombia	13.97	
4	7	Domenica Crose	Peru	14.71	

=== 4 × 100 metres relay ===
3 December

Rank	Lane	Team	Name	Time	Notes
1st place, gold medalist(s)	6	Colombia	Angélica Gamboa, Danna Banquez, María Maturana, Marlet Ospino	44.00	
2nd place, silver medalist(s)	7	Dominican Republic	Fiordaliza Cofil, Liranyi Alonso, Milagros Durán, Patricia Sine	44.23	
3rd place, bronze medalist(s)	9	Chile	Anaís Hernández, Antonia Ramirez, Javiera Cañas, Macarena Borie	45.08	
4	4	Peru	Catalina Yzaga, Cayetana Chirinos, Aracely Pretell, Paula Daruich	45.45	
5	5	Ecuador	Ángela Tenorio, Génesis Cañola, Kristel Méndez, Maribel Caicedo	45.48	
6	8	Venezuela	Beynailis Romero, Glanyernis Guerra, Hilary Rivas, Orangy Jiménez	45.52	
7	3	Bolivia	Alinny Delgadillo, Daniela Vaca, Guadalupe Torrez, Leticia Arispe	46.42	

=== 4 × 400 metres relay ===
4 December

Rank	Lane	Team	Name	Time	Notes
1st place, gold medalist(s)	5	Colombia	Karla Vélez, Lina Licona, María Alejandra Rocha, Paola Loboa	3:34.10	GR
2nd place, silver medalist(s)	6	Dominican Republic	Bianca Acosta, Estrella de Aza, Milagros Durán, Patricia Sine	3:37.56	
3rd place, bronze medalist(s)	7	Venezuela	Ana Torin, María Celeste Rojas, Nahomy García, Walezka Ortiz	3:39.78	
4	2	Bolivia	Alinny Delgadillo, Cecilia Gómez, Lucía Sotomayor, Mariana Arce	3:50.33	
5	3	Peru	Catalina Yzaga, Estefania Papi, Isabel Quiroz, Laura Vila	3:52.21	
	4	Ecuador	Evelin Mercado, Génesis Cañola, Kristel Méndez, Pamela Barreto	DQ	TR17.2.3

=== Half marathon walk ===
29 November

Rank	Name	Nationality	Time	Notes
1st place, gold medalist(s)	Kimberly García	Peru	1:35:10	GR, NR
2nd place, silver medalist(s)	Mary Luz Andía	Peru	1:40:25	
3rd place, bronze medalist(s)	Magaly Bonilla	Ecuador	1:42:10	
4	Ángela Castro	Bolivia	1:46:56	
5	María Fernanda Peinado	Guatemala	1:52:40	

=== High jump ===
3 December

Rank	Name	Nationality	1.70	1.75	1.80	1.83	1.86	1.89	1.91	Result	Notes
1st place, gold medalist(s)	Hellen Tenorio	Colombia	xo	o	xo	o	xxo	xo	xxx	1.89	PB
2nd place, silver medalist(s)	Glenka Antonia	Curaçao	–	–	o	o	xo	xxx		1.86	Guest
2nd place, silver medalist(s)	María Arboleda	Colombia	–	o	o	xxx				1.80	

=== Long jump ===
1 December

Rank	Name	Nationality	#1	#2	#3	#4	#5	#6	Result	Notes
1st place, gold medalist(s)	Natalia Linares	Colombia	6.22	6.66	x	6.48	6.95	6.73	6.95	GR, AU23R, NR
2nd place, silver medalist(s)	Martha Araújo	Colombia	6.33	x	6.63	6.29	6.51	6.37	6.63	
3rd place, bronze medalist(s)	Ornelis Ortiz	Venezuela	6.14	6.25	6.16	6.09	5.87	6.36	6.36	
4	Evelina Minaya	Dominican Republic	6.21	6.18	6.32	–	–	–	6.32	
5	Paola Mautino	Peru	5.87	x	5.94	5.85	5.92	5.84	5.94	
6	Paula Daruich	Peru	5.82	5.85	5.82	5.64	5.84	5.85	5.85	
7	Nathalee Aranda	Panama	X	x	x	5.83	x	x	5.83	
8	Daniela Vaca	Bolivia	x	x	x	5.66	5.44	x	5.66	

=== Triple jump ===
4 December

Rank	Name	Nationality	#1	#2	#3	#4	#5	#6	Result	Notes
1st place, gold medalist(s)	Valeria Quispe	Bolivia	13.27	13.27	x	13.10	13.48	x	13.48	
2nd place, silver medalist(s)	Adriana Chila	Ecuador	11.54	13.33	x	13.05	13.03	x	13.33	
3rd place, bronze medalist(s)	Silvana Segura	Peru	12.95	12.95	12.98	x	x	12.42	12.98	
4	Ornelis Ortiz	Venezuela	12.51	x	x	12.45	12.98	12.06	12.98	
5	Génesis Pire	Venezuela	12.39	12.24	x	x	x	x	12.39	
6	Kiara Mujica	Peru	x	11.91	11.95	11.69	12.22	x	12.22	

=== Shot put ===
4 December

Rank	Name	Nationality	#1	#2	#3	#4	#5	#6	Result	Notes
1st place, gold medalist(s)	Rosa Ramírez	Dominican Republic	15.91	x	17.44	x	17.32	x	17.44	
2nd place, silver medalist(s)	Ivana Gallardo	Chile	16.04	17.22	16.56	17.22	x	17.15	17.22	
3rd place, bronze medalist(s)	Ahymara Espinoza	Venezuela	16.52	16.58	16.73	17.05	16.55	16.54	17.05	
4	Belsy Quiñónez	Ecuador	15.80	16.75	16.67	x	x	x	16.75	NR
5	Yerlin Mesa	Colombia	14.34	15.19	15.21	15.02	15.45	15.07	15.45	

=== Discus throw ===
1 December

Rank	Name	Nationality	#1	#2	#3	#4	#5	#6	Result	Notes
1st place, gold medalist(s)	Yerlin Mesa	Colombia	49.95	51.89	53.78	53.02	52.09	x	53.78	
2nd place, silver medalist(s)	Karen Gallardo	Chile	49.93	x	51.49	49.75	50.32	52.80	52.80	
3rd place, bronze medalist(s)	Ottaynis Febres	Venezuela	50.24	48.47	x	x	49.05	49.65	50.24	

=== Hammer throw ===
5 December

Rank	Name	Nationality	#1	#2	#3	#4	#5	#6	Result	Notes
1st place, gold medalist(s)	Rosa Rodríguez	Venezuela	69.97	x	68.56	x	–	x	69.97	
2nd place, silver medalist(s)	Mayra Gaviria	Colombia	67.30	68.06	67.13	66.56	x	66.42	68.06	
3rd place, bronze medalist(s)	Ximena Zorrilla	Peru	x	63.33	66.22	x	65.17	x	66.22	
4	Mariana Walker	Chile	x	x	62.44	x	x	x	62.44	

=== Heptathlon ===
2–3 December

The highest mark recorded in each event is highlighted in yellow

Rank	Name	Nationality	100m H	HJ	SP	200m	LJ	JT	800m	Points	Notes
1st place, gold medalist(s)	Damaris Palomeque	Colombia	14.08	1.60	12.66	23.69	5.67	26.02	2:18.04	5420	
2nd place, silver medalist(s)	Daniela Medrano	Peru	15.03	1.57	9.75	25.71	5.28	26.16	2:31.75	4587	

== Mixed results ==
=== 4 × 100 metres relay ===
1 December

Rank	Lane	Team	Name	Time	Notes
1st place, gold medalist(s)	3	Ecuador	Anderson Marquínez, Anahí Suárez, Katriel Angulo, Nicole Caicedo	41.52	GR, NR
2nd place, silver medalist(s)	6	Colombia	Angélica Gamboa, Deiner Guaitoto, Enoc Moreno, Marlet Ospino	42.05	NR
3rd place, bronze medalist(s)	7	Paraguay	Fredy Maidana, Jonathan Wolk, Macarena Giménez, Xenia Hiebert	42.22	42.213
4	2	Venezuela	Alexis Nieves, Beynailis Romero, David Vivas, Glanyernis Guerra	42.22	42.219
5	5	Dominican Republic	Fiordaliza Cofil, Liranyi Alonso, Melbin Marcelino, Yancarlos Martínez	42.99	
	4	Peru	Aracely Pretell, Pablo Rodríguez, Paula Daruich, Rodrigo Cornejo	DQ	TR24.7

=== 4 × 400 metres relay ===
5 December

Rank	Lane	Team	Name	Time	Notes
1st place, gold medalist(s)	9	Colombia	Bernardo Baloyes, Daniel Balanta, Lina Licona, Paola Loboa	3:20.08	
2nd place, silver medalist(s)	4	Venezuela	Javier Gómez, Kelvis Padrino, Nahomy García, Walezka Ortiz	3:20.44	
3rd place, bronze medalist(s)	3	Dominican Republic	Bianca Acosta, Estrella de Aza, Ferdy Agramonte, Juander Santos	3:20.72	
4	8	Ecuador	Francisco Tejeda, Génesis Cañola, Ian Andrey Pata, Pamela Barreto	3:23.14	
5	5	Chile	Antonia Ramírez, Esteban González, Rafael Muñoz, Valentina Barrientos	3:28.53	
6	7	Peru	Estefania Papi, Jeffrey Cajo, Laura Vila, Rodrigo Cornejo	3:30.75	
7	6	Bolivia	Cecilia Gómez, Leandro Daza, Lucia Sotomayor, Ramiro Ulunque	3:36.53	
