= Athletics at the 2022 Bolivarian Games – Results =

These are the full results of the athletics competition at the 2022 Bolivarian Games which took place between 1 and 5 July 2022 in Valledupar, Colombia.

== Men's results ==
=== 100 metres ===
Heats – 1 July
Wind:
Heat 1: -1.4 m/s, Heat 2: -1.6 m/s

Rank	Heat	Name	Nationality	Time	Notes
1	2	Alonso Edward	Panama	10.38	Q
2	2	Carlos Palacios	Colombia	10.42	Q
3	2	Christopher Valdez	Dominican Republic	10.43	Q
4	1	José González	Dominican Republic	10.53	Q
5	2	César Almirón	Paraguay	10.65	q
6	1	David Vivas	Venezuela	10.67	Q
7	1	Arturo Deliser	Panama	10.73	Q
8	2	Katriel Angulo	Ecuador	10.77	q
9	1	Jhonny Rentería	Colombia	10.87	
10	1	Aron Earl	Peru	10.91	
11	2	Luis Humberto Angulo	Peru	10.92	
12	1	Tito Hinojosa	Bolivia	10.95	
13	1	Nilo Duré	Paraguay	11.05	
14	1	Anderson Marquinez	Ecuador	28.93	
15	2	Abdel Kalil	Venezuela	37.28	

Final – 1 July

Wind: +1.0 m/s

Rank	Lane	Name	Nationality	Time	Notes
1st place, gold medalist(s)	5	Alonso Edward	Panama	10.17	
2nd place, silver medalist(s)	3	Christopher Valdez	Dominican Republic	10.18	
3rd place, bronze medalist(s)	6	Carlos Palacios	Colombia	10.23	
4	4	José González	Dominican Republic	10.30	
5	9	Abdel Kalil	Venezuela	10.42	
6	2	César Almirón	Paraguay	10.43	
7	8	Arturo Deliser	Panama	10.43	
8	1	David Vivas	Venezuela	10.51	

=== 200 metres ===
Heats – 3 July
Wind:
Heat 1: +1.0 m/s, Heat 2: +1.2 m/s

Rank	Heat	Name	Nationality	Time	Notes
1	1	Erick Sánchez	Dominican Republic	20.65	Q
2	2	Melbin Marcelino	Dominican Republic	20.78	Q
3	2	Alonso Edward	Panama	20.79	Q
4	1	Enzo Faulbaum	Chile	20.91	Q
5	1	Rafael Vásquez	Venezuela	20.94	Q
6	2	Carlos Palacios	Colombia	20.96	Q
7	1	Katriel Angulo	Ecuador	21.03	q
8	2	Abdel Kalil	Venezuela	21.25	q
9	1	Arturo Deliser	Panama	21.26	
10	2	Freddy Maidana	Paraguay	21.47	
11	1	Raúl Mena	Colombia	21.63	
12	2	Jonathan Wolk	Paraguay	21.79	
13	1	Tito Hinojosa	Bolivia	21.89	

Final – 3 July

Wind: 0.0 m/s

Rank	Lane	Name	Nationality	Time	Notes
1st place, gold medalist(s)	6	Alonso Edward	Panama	20.41	
2nd place, silver medalist(s)	1	Erick Sánchez	Dominican Republic	20.64	
3rd place, bronze medalist(s)	5	Melbin Marcelino	Dominican Republic	20.85	
4	7	Carlos Palacios	Colombia	20.97	
5	2	Enzo Faulbaum	Chile	21.00	
6	3	Rafael Vásquez	Venezuela	21.12	
7	4	Katriel Angulo	Ecuador	21.39	
8	8	Abdel Kalil	Venezuela	21.40	

=== 400 metres ===
4 July

Rank	Lane	Name	Nationality	Time	Notes
1st place, gold medalist(s)	8	Robert King	Dominican Republic	46.47	
2nd place, silver medalist(s)	4	Kelvis Padrino	Venezuela	46.96	
3rd place, bronze medalist(s)	3	Gustavo Barrios	Colombia	47.24	
4	7	Steeven Salas	Ecuador	48.22	
5	2	Alan Minda	Ecuador	48.32	
6	5	Javier Gómez	Venezuela	48.52	
7	1	Rodrigo Cornejo	Peru	50.59	

=== 800 metres ===
5 July

Rank	Name	Nationality	Time	Notes
1st place, gold medalist(s)	Jelssin Robledo	Colombia	1:48.05	
2nd place, silver medalist(s)	José Antonio Maita	Venezuela	1:48.57	
3rd place, bronze medalist(s)	Marco Vilca	Peru	1:48.77	
4	Jhonatan Rodríguez	Colombia	1:48.94	
5	Lucirio Antonio Garrido	Venezuela	1:49.39	
6	Esteban González	Chile	1:49.64	
7	Rafael Muñoz	Chile	1:51.10	
8	Gerson Montes	Ecuador	1:51.18	

=== 1500 metres ===
1 July

Rank	Name	Nationality	Time	Notes
1st place, gold medalist(s)	Carlos San Martín	Colombia	3:42.91	GR
2nd place, silver medalist(s)	David Ninavia	Bolivia	3:43.60	NR, NU20R
3rd place, bronze medalist(s)	Esteban González	Chile	3:44.29	
4	Sebastián López	Venezuela	3:44.67	
5	Luis Eduardo Viafara	Colombia	3:45.18	
6	Diego Ignacio Uribe	Chile	3:47.53	
7	Lucirio Antonio Garrido	Venezuela	3:51.19	
8	Gerson Montes	Ecuador	3:53.35	
9	Walter Niña	Peru	3:55.00	

=== 5000 metres ===
1 July

Rank	Name	Nationality	Time	Notes
1st place, gold medalist(s)	Carlos Díaz	Chile	14:34.59	
2nd place, silver medalist(s)	Vidal Basco	Bolivia	14:35.21	
3rd place, bronze medalist(s)	Iván Darío González	Colombia	14:35.70	
4	Ignacio Velázquez	Chile	14:36.65	
5	Yuri Labra	Peru	14:37.85	
6	Nicolás Herrera	Colombia	14:39.49	
7	Luis Orta	Venezuela	14:47.55	
8	Whinton Palma	Venezuela	14:52.81	
9	Derlis Ayala	Paraguay	14:56.30	
10	Luis Masabanda	Ecuador	15:09.62	

=== 10,000 metres ===
4 July

Rank	Name	Nationality	Time	Notes
1st place, gold medalist(s)	Vidal Basco	Bolivia	29:40.80	
2nd place, silver medalist(s)	Héctor Garibay	Bolivia	29:42.54	
3rd place, bronze medalist(s)	Ignacio Velázquez	Chile	29:59.96	
4	Carlos Díaz	Chile	30:03.46	
5	Iván Darío González	Colombia	30:08.56	
6	Nicolás Herrera	Colombia	30:25.67	
7	Luis Masabanda	Ecuador	31:33.41	
	Derlis Ayala	Paraguay	DNF	
	Rene Champi	Peru	DNF	
	Luis Fernando Ostos	Peru	DNF	
	Luis Orta	Venezuela	DNF	

=== Half marathon ===
5 July

Rank	Name	Nationality	Time	Notes
1st place, gold medalist(s)	Rafael Loza	Ecuador	1:06:35	GR
2nd place, silver medalist(s)	Ferdinand Cereceda	Peru	1:06:50	
3rd place, bronze medalist(s)	Christian Vascónez	Ecuador	1:07:06	
4	Jeison Suárez	Colombia	1:07:56	
5	Whinton Palma	Venezuela	1:08:02	
6	Derlis Ayala	Paraguay	1:10:49	
7	Cristhian Pacheco	Peru	1:11:51	
8	Amauri Rodríguez	Dominican Republic	1:17:06	
	Jorge Castelblanco	Panama	DNF	

=== 110 metres hurdles ===
2 July
Wind: +1.6 m/s

Rank	Lane	Name	Nationality	Time	Notes
1st place, gold medalist(s)	4	Fanor Escobar	Colombia	13.55	
2nd place, silver medalist(s)	5	Brayan Rojas	Colombia	14.06	
3rd place, bronze medalist(s)	3	Martín Sáenz	Chile	14.13	
4	2	Mauricio Garrido	Peru	14.18	
5	6	Paolo Crose	Peru	19.59	

=== 400 metres hurdles ===
4 July

Rank	Lane	Name	Nationality	Time	Notes
1st place, gold medalist(s)	4	Juander Santos	Dominican Republic	50.05	GR
2nd place, silver medalist(s)	5	Alfredo Sepúlveda	Chile	50.25	
3rd place, bronze medalist(s)	3	Fanor Escobar	Colombia	50.62	
4	2	Kevin Mina	Colombia	51.16	
5	7	Egbert Espinoza	Venezuela	52.03	
6	6	César Parra	Venezuela	52.48	
7	8	Luis Elespuru	Peru	55.52	
8	1	Estephano Kalinowski	Peru	56.80	

=== 3000 metres steeplechase ===
2 July

Rank	Name	Nationality	Time	Notes
1st place, gold medalist(s)	Carlos San Martín	Colombia	8:44.62	
2nd place, silver medalist(s)	Julio Palomino	Peru	8:48.97	
3rd place, bronze medalist(s)	Yuri Labra	Peru	9:07.17	
4	Marcelo Silva	Chile	9:13.15	
5	José González	Venezuela	9:33.16	

=== 4 × 100 metres relay ===
4 July

Rank	Lane	Team	Name	Time	Notes
1st place, gold medalist(s)	8	Dominican Republic	Christopher Valdez, Erick Sánchez, José González, Melbin Marcelino	39.26	
2nd place, silver medalist(s)	6	Venezuela	Abdel Kalil, Bryant Alamo, David Vivas, Rafael Vásquez	39.75	
3rd place, bronze medalist(s)	3	Paraguay	César Almirón, Fredy Maidana, Jonathan Wolk, Nilo Duré	39.90	NR
4	4	Colombia	Carlos Palacios, Fanor Escobar, Jhonny Rentería, Neiker Abello	40.19	
5	5	Ecuador	Steeven Salas, Alan Minda, Katriel Angulo, Edisson Acuña	41.21	
6	7	Peru	Luis Humberto Angulo, Aron Earl, Mauricio Garrido, Rodrigo Cornejo	41.44	

=== 4 × 400 metres relay ===
5 July

Rank	Lane	Team	Name	Time	Notes
1st place, gold medalist(s)	4	Colombia	Gustavo Barrios, Raúl Mena, Jelssin Robledo, Jhonatan Rodríguez	3:06.61	
2nd place, silver medalist(s)	7	Venezuela	Javier Gómez, José Antonio Maita, Kelvis Padrino, Julio Rodríguez	3:07.28	
3rd place, bronze medalist(s)	5	Dominican Republic	Robert King, Melbin Marcelino, José Miguel Paulino, Juander Santos	3:08.11	
4	3	Ecuador	Alan Minda, Edison Acuña, Katriel Angulo, Steeven Salas	3:10.94	
5	6	Chile	Alfredo Sepúlveda, Enzo Faulbaum, Esteban González, Rafael Muñoz	3:11.92	

=== 20 kilometres walk ===
1 July

Rank	Name	Nationality	Time	Notes
1st place, gold medalist(s)	Jordy Jiménez	Ecuador	1:28:54	
2nd place, silver medalist(s)	José Leonardo Montaña	Colombia	1:29:09	
3rd place, bronze medalist(s)	Manuel Esteban Soto	Colombia	1:31:41	
4	Jorge Luis Méndez	Dominican Republic	1:44:34	

=== 35 kilometres walk ===
2 July

Rank	Name	Nationality	Time	Notes
1st place, gold medalist(s)	César Rodríguez	Peru	2:43:44	GR
2nd place, silver medalist(s)	Diego Pinzón	Colombia	2:44:21	
3rd place, bronze medalist(s)	Luis Henry Campos	Peru	2:45:02	
4	Yassir Cabrera	Panama	2:56:59	
	Jorge Armando Ruiz	Colombia	DQ	

=== High jump ===
2 July

Rank	Name	Nationality	Result	Notes
1st place, gold medalist(s)	Nicolás Numair	Chile	2.18	=PB
2nd place, silver medalist(s)	Gilmar Correa	Colombia	2.18	PB
3rd place, bronze medalist(s)	Pedro Alamos	Chile	2.10	
4	Arturo Chávez	Peru	2.05	

=== Pole vault ===
5 July

Rank	Name	Nationality	4.60	4.80	5.00	5.10	5.20	5.30	5.35	5.40	5.45	Result	Notes
1st place, gold medalist(s)	Dyander Pacho	Ecuador	–	–	o	o	o	o	o	o	xxx	5.40	GR
2nd place, silver medalist(s)	Austin Ramos	Ecuador	–	xo	o	o	xo	xo	xx	x		5.30	PB
3rd place, bronze medalist(s)	Walter Viáfara	Colombia	–	–	o	o	xo	xx	x			5.20	
4	Ricardo Montes de Oca	Venezuela	–	o	o	xxx						5.00	
	Guillermo Correa	Chile	xxx									NM	
	José Tomás Nieto	Colombia	–	xxx								NM	

=== Long jump ===
1 July

Rank	Name	Nationality	#1	#2	#3	#4	#5	#6	Result	Notes
1st place, gold medalist(s)	Jhon Berrío	Colombia	7.42	7.46	7.56	6.19	7.55	5.81	7.56	
2nd place, silver medalist(s)	Santiago Cova	Venezuela	x	6.59	7.04	7.56	7.49	7.36	7.56	
3rd place, bronze medalist(s)	Eubrig Masa	Venezuela	x	x	6.91	7.08	7.40	7.05	7.40	
	Arnovis Dalmero	Colombia	x	x	r				NM	

=== Triple jump ===
3 July

Rank	Name	Nationality	#1	#2	#3	#4	#5	#6	Result	Notes
1st place, gold medalist(s)	Leodan Torrealba	Venezuela	16.57	16.43	16.38	15.24	15.92	?	16.57w	
2nd place, silver medalist(s)	Geiner Moreno	Colombia	x	x	16.11	15.96	x	15.96	16.11	
3rd place, bronze medalist(s)	Steeven Palacios	Ecuador	x	x	15.05	14.88	15.62	15.93	15.93	
4	Frixon Chila	Ecuador	x	15.67	15.84	x	15.54	?	15.84	

=== Javelin throw ===
5 July

Rank	Name	Nationality	#1	#2	#3	#4	#5	#6	Result	Notes
1st place, gold medalist(s)	Francisco Muse	Chile	70.47	x	73.31	73.45	76.28	76.71	76.71	
2nd place, silver medalist(s)	Giovanni Díaz	Paraguay	72.11	71.70	73.73	72.77	72.81	73.84	73.84	
3rd place, bronze medalist(s)	Arley Ibargüen	Colombia	69.69	70.79	71.25	73.21	x	70.95	73.21	
4	Billy Julio	Colombia	72.01	69.14	x	x	68.91	68.38	72.01	
5	Jonathan Cedeño	Panama	x	69.21	68.59	68.72	65.92	x	69.21	
	José Escobar	Ecuador							NM	

=== Decathlon ===
1–2 July

The highest mark recorded in each event is highlighted in yellow

Rank	Name	Nationality	100m	LJ	SP	HJ	400m	110m H	DT	PV	JT	1500m	Points	Notes
1st place, gold medalist(s)	Andy Preciado	Ecuador	11.34	7.04	15.62	2.09	51.37	14.38	48.82	4.60	57.57	4:48.78	7966	GR
2nd place, silver medalist(s)	Gerson Izaguirre	Venezuela	11.10	7.37	14.89	1.91	50.32	14.23	45.19	4.60	53.68	5:04.37	7731	
3rd place, bronze medalist(s)	José Miguel Paulino	Dominican Republic	11.19	7.25	13.30	1.91	48.60	14.88	41.21	4.40	48.09	4:48.77	7452	
	Georni Jaramillo	Venezuela	11.08	7.31	14.95	1.91	50.40	14.14	45.92	4.60	NM	DNS	DNF	
	José Lemos	Colombia	11.82	6.16	15.56	NM	DNS	–	–	–	NM	DNS	DNF	

== Women's results ==
=== 100 metres ===
Heats – 1 July
Wind:
Heat 1: -1.5 m/s, Heat 2: -2.0 m/s

Rank	Heat	Name	Nationality	Time	Notes
1	2	Ángela Tenorio	Ecuador	11.61	Q
2	1	Anahí Suárez	Ecuador	11.64	Q
3	2	María Ignacia Montt	Chile	11.77	Q
4	2	Selena Arjona	Panama	11.94	Q
5	1	Angélica Gamboa	Colombia	11.98	Q
6	1	Macarena Borie	Chile	12.05	Q
7	1	Guadalupe Torrez	Bolivia	12.13	q
8	1	Liranyi Alonso	Dominican Republic	12.14	q
9	2	Leticia Arispe	Bolivia	12.26	
10	2	Laura Martínez	Colombia	12.32	
11	2	Paula Daruich	Peru	12.39	

Final – 1 July

Wind: +0.9 m/s

Rank	Lane	Name	Nationality	Time	Notes
1st place, gold medalist(s)		Ángela Tenorio	Ecuador	11.14	GR
2nd place, silver medalist(s)		Anahí Suárez	Ecuador	11.38	
3rd place, bronze medalist(s)		Selena Arjona	Panama	11.61	
4		Angélica Gamboa	Colombia	11.68	
5		Liranyi Alonso	Dominican Republic	11.76	
6		Macarena Borie	Chile	11.77	
7		Guadalupe Torrez	Bolivia	12.01	
8		María Ignacia Montt	Chile	12.76	

=== 200 metres ===
Heats – 3 July
Wind:
Heat 1: +0.4 m/s, Heat 2: +1.0 m/s

Rank	Heat	Name	Nationality	Time	Notes
1	1	Anahí Suárez	Ecuador	23.13	Q
2	1	Shary Vallecilla	Colombia	23.26	Q
3	1	Anabel Medina	Dominican Republic	23.44	Q
4	2	Ángela Tenorio	Ecuador	23.50	Q
5	2	Orangy Jiménez	Venezuela	23.53	Q
6	1	Yoveinny Mota	Venezuela	23.57	q
7	2	Cristal Cuervo	Panama	24.08	Q
8	1	María Ignacia Montt	Chile	24.10	q
9	2	Laura Martínez	Colombia	24.37	
10	2	Leticia Arispe	Bolivia	24.64	
	1	Selena Arjona	Panama	DQ	

Final – 3 July

Wind: -0.4 m/s

Rank	Lane	Name	Nationality	Time	Notes
1st place, gold medalist(s)	1	Shary Vallecilla	Colombia	23.30	
2nd place, silver medalist(s)	7	Orangy Jiménez	Venezuela	23.45	
3rd place, bronze medalist(s)	2	Anahí Suárez	Ecuador	23.48	
4	3	Anabel Medina	Dominican Republic	23.50	
5	8	Cristal Cuervo	Panama	23.95	
6	5	María Ignacia Montt	Chile	23.98	
	6	Ángela Tenorio	Ecuador	DNF	
	4	Yoveinny Mota	Venezuela	DNS	

=== 400 metres ===
4 July

Rank	Lane	Name	Nationality	Time	Notes
1st place, gold medalist(s)	5	Evelis Aguilar	Colombia	51.84	GR
2nd place, silver medalist(s)	4	Martina Weil	Chile	52.64	
3rd place, bronze medalist(s)	1	Nicole Caicedo	Ecuador	54.36	
4	8	Mariana Pérez	Dominican Republic	54.48	
5	3	Cristal Cuervo	Panama	55.57	
6	2	Ibellis Romero	Venezuela	55.72	
7	6	Evelin Mercado	Ecuador	55.81	
8	7	Valery Montenegro	Venezuela	57.00	

=== 800 metres ===
5 July

Rank	Name	Nationality	Time	Notes
1st place, gold medalist(s)	Rosangelica Escobar	Colombia	2:04.63	
2nd place, silver medalist(s)	Anita Poma	Peru	2:05.57	NR, NU20R
3rd place, bronze medalist(s)	Andrea Calderón	Ecuador	2:05.89	
4	Johana Arrieta	Colombia	2:06.35	
5	Berdine Castillo	Chile	2:08.62	
6	Laura Acuña	Chile	2:09.78	
	Mariana Pérez	Dominican Republic	DQ	RT4.4.3

=== 1500 metres ===
1 July

Rank	Name	Nationality	Time	Notes
1st place, gold medalist(s)	Joselyn Brea	Venezuela	4:16.64	
2nd place, silver medalist(s)	Muriel Coneo	Colombia	4:17.77	
3rd place, bronze medalist(s)	Josefa Paz	Chile	4:18.07	
4	Andrea Calderón	Ecuador	4:20.47	
5	Anita Poma	Peru	4:20.48	
6	Laura Acuña	Chile	4:21.68	
7	María Garrido	Venezuela	4:31.90	
8	Johana Arrieta	Colombia	4:34.13	
	Andrea Ferris	Panama	DNF	

=== 5000 metres ===
4 July

Rank	Name	Nationality	Time	Notes
1st place, gold medalist(s)	Josefa Paz	Chile	17:22.21	
2nd place, silver medalist(s)	Soledad Torre	Peru	17:22.89	
3rd place, bronze medalist(s)	Muriel Coneo	Colombia	17:23.45	
4	Jovana de la Cruz	Peru	17:24.81	
5	Edymar Brea	Venezuela	17:34.27	
6	Angie Nocua	Colombia	17:47.93	

=== 10,000 metres ===
1 July

Rank	Name	Nationality	Time	Notes
1st place, gold medalist(s)	Jovana de la Cruz	Peru	34:48.56	
2nd place, silver medalist(s)	Edymar Brea	Venezuela	34:49.59	
3rd place, bronze medalist(s)	Soledad Torre	Peru	34:50.29	
4	Silvia Ortiz	Ecuador	34:54.92	
5	Leidy Romero	Colombia	35:08.88	
6	Silvia Paredes	Ecuador	36:15.68	
	Magaly García	Venezuela	DNF	

=== Half marathon ===
5 July

Rank	Name	Nationality	Time	Notes
1st place, gold medalist(s)	Gladys Tejeda	Peru	1:15:14	
2nd place, silver medalist(s)	Luz Mery Rojas	Peru	1:15:23	
3rd place, bronze medalist(s)	Rosa Chacha	Ecuador	1:16:43	
4	Katherine Tisalema	Ecuador	1:18:49	
5	Angie Orjuela	Colombia	1:20:49	
6	Magaly García	Venezuela	1:21:08	
	Kellys Arias	Colombia	DNF	
	Jhoselyn Camargo	Bolivia	DNF	

=== 100 metres hurdles ===
2 July
Wind: -0.2 m/s

Rank	Lane	Name	Nationality	Time	Notes
1st place, gold medalist(s)	4	Yoveinny Mota	Venezuela	13.07	GR
2nd place, silver medalist(s)	5	Maribel Caicedo	Ecuador	13.31	
3rd place, bronze medalist(s)	3	Diana Bazalar	Peru	13.62	
4	6	Ana Camila Pirelli	Paraguay	13.75	

=== 400 metres hurdles ===
4 July

Rank	Lane	Name	Nationality	Time	Notes
1st place, gold medalist(s)	2	Gianna Woodruff	Panama	55.32	GR
2nd place, silver medalist(s)	4	Valeria Cabezas	Colombia	57.47	
3rd place, bronze medalist(s)	5	Evelyn Del Carmen	Dominican Republic	58.90	
4	3	Virginia Villalba	Ecuador	59.31	
5	6	Franshina Martínez	Dominican Republic	1:00.81	

=== 4 × 100 metres relay ===
4 July

Rank	Lane	Team	Name	Time	Notes
1st place, gold medalist(s)	4	Colombia	Angélica Gamboa, Laura Martínez, Evelyn Rivera, Shary Vallecilla	44.52	
2nd place, silver medalist(s)	3	Chile	Macarena Borie, Javiera Cañas, Isidora Jiménez, María Ignacia Montt	44.57	NR
3rd place, bronze medalist(s)	5	Ecuador	Nicole Caicedo, Evelin Mercado, Anahí Suárez, Virginia Villalba	45.55	
4	6	Peru	Alejandra Arevalo, Diana Bazalar, Paula Daruich, Silvana Segura	48.60	

=== 4 × 400 metres relay ===
5 July

Rank	Lane	Team	Name	Time	Notes
1st place, gold medalist(s)	4	Colombia	Evelis Aguilar, Johana Arrieta, Rosangelica Escobar, Valeria Cabezas	3:36.91	
2nd place, silver medalist(s)	3	Chile	Berdine Castillo, Isidora Jiménez, Martina Weil, Rocio Muñoz	3:36.98	
3rd place, bronze medalist(s)	6	Ecuador	Nicole Caicedo, Evelin Mercado, Anahí Suárez, Virginia Villalba	3:37.84	
4	5	Dominican Republic	Anabel Medina, Evelin Del Carmen, Franshina Martínez, Mariana Pérez	3:37.89	

=== 20 kilometres walk ===
1 July

Rank	Name	Nationality	Time	Notes
1st place, gold medalist(s)	Karla Jaramillo	Ecuador	1:38:46	
2nd place, silver medalist(s)	Sandra Galvis	Colombia	1:39:55	

=== 35 kilometres walk ===
2 July

Rank	Name	Nationality	Time	Notes
1st place, gold medalist(s)	Magaly Bonilla	Ecuador	2:59:55	GR
2nd place, silver medalist(s)	Arabelly Orjuela	Colombia	3:00:15	
3rd place, bronze medalist(s)	Evelyn Inga	Peru	3:04:29	

=== High jump ===
1 July

Rank	Name	Nationality	1.65	1.70	1.75	1.78	1.81	1.84	1.86	Result	Notes
1st place, gold medalist(s)	Jennifer Rodríguez	Colombia	–	o	o	o	xo	o	xxx	1.84	
2nd place, silver medalist(s)	Marysabel Senyu	Dominican Republic	–	o	o	o	o	xo	xxx	1.84	
3rd place, bronze medalist(s)	María Fernanda Murillo	Colombia	–	o	xxo	o	xxx			1.78	
4	Antonia Merino	Chile	xo	o	xxx					1.70	
4	Catalina Cárcamo	Chile	xo	o	xxx					1.70	
6	Ariana Gutiérrez	Venezuela	o	xo	xxx					1.70	
7	Joyce Micolta	Ecuador	xo	xo	xxx					1.70	

=== Pole vault ===
4 July

Rank	Name	Nationality	3.60	3.80	3.90	4.00	4.05	4.10	Result	Notes
1st place, gold medalist(s)	Nicole Hein	Peru	–	xo	o	o	o	xxx	4.05	
2nd place, silver medalist(s)	Alejandra Arévalo	Peru	–	o	–	o	–	xxx	4.00	
3rd place, bronze medalist(s)	Katherine Castillo	Colombia	–	–	o	x	xx		3.90	
4	Antonia Crestani	Chile	o	o	xxx				3.80	
5	Luna Nazarit	Colombia	o	xxx					3.60	

=== Long jump ===
2 July

Rank	Name	Nationality	#1	#2	#3	#4	#5	#6	Result	Notes
1st place, gold medalist(s)	Natalia Linares	Colombia	6.68	6.40	x	6.17w	6.62w	6.79w	6.79w	GR, AU20R
2nd place, silver medalist(s)	Natalee Aranda	Panama	6.34	x	6.38	x	x	6.36	6.38	
3rd place, bronze medalist(s)	Yuliana Angulo	Ecuador	5.79	x	6.24	x	x	6.18	6.24	
4	Rocío Muñoz	Chile	x	x	6.22w	x	6.02w	6.13	6.22w	
5	María Trinidad Hurtado	Chile	x	6.15	6.21	6.20	x	x	6.21	
6	Ana Paula Argüello	Paraguay	5.52	5.63	5.88	5.74	x	5.72	5.88	

=== Triple jump ===
3 July

Rank	Name	Nationality	#1	#2	#3	#4	#5	#6	Result	Notes
1st place, gold medalist(s)	Liuba Zaldívar	Ecuador	13.47	13.57w	?	?	?	?	13.57w	
2nd place, silver medalist(s)	Fernanda Maita	Venezuela	13.05	12.77	x	12.57	x	12.66	13.05	
3rd place, bronze medalist(s)	Silvana Segura	Peru	x	x	12.75	x	12.44	12.46	12.75	
4	Ana Paula Argüello	Paraguay	12.67	12.59	x	12.49	11.78	x	12.67	

=== Shot put ===
3 July

Rank	Name	Nationality	#1	#2	#3	#4	#5	#6	Result	Notes
1st place, gold medalist(s)	Rosa Ramírez	Dominican Republic	17.03	x	16.65	17.15	16.74	17.31	17.31	
2nd place, silver medalist(s)	Natalia Duco	Chile	16.73	16.75	16.39	16.14	16.42	16.53	16.75	
3rd place, bronze medalist(s)	Ivana Gallardo	Chile	16.17	x	14.94	15.66	15.94	16.52	16.52	
4	Lorna Zurita	Ecuador	15.20	15.67	15.09	14.88	15.52	14.41	15.67	NR
5	Sandra Lemos	Colombia	x	14.88	14.23	15.16	15.16	x	15.16	
6	Yerlin Mesa	Colombia	15.02	x	14.87	15.15	x	14.01	15.15	
	Ambar Sánchez	Venezuela							DNS	

=== Discus throw ===
4 July

Rank	Name	Nationality	#1	#2	#3	#4	#5	#6	Result	Notes
1st place, gold medalist(s)	Karen Gallardo	Chile	55.36	55.57	55.73	59.38	57.56	x	59.38	GR
2nd place, silver medalist(s)	Yerlin Mesa	Colombia	48.29	52.70	53.37	46.07	51.53	52.40	53.37	
3rd place, bronze medalist(s)	Catalina Bravo	Chile	52.07	53.32	53.04	52.21	49.59	50.27	53.32	
4	Aixa Middleton	Panama	48.95	45.20	x	47.31	49.11	x	49.11	

=== Hammer throw ===
1 July

Rank	Name	Nationality	#1	#2	#3	#4	#5	#6	Result	Notes
1st place, gold medalist(s)	Ximena Zorrilla	Peru	x	60.75	63.63	65.39	64.53	66.96	66.96	NR
2nd place, silver medalist(s)	Mayra Gaviria	Colombia	63.19	63.56	x	64.93	64.06	64.93	64.93	
3rd place, bronze medalist(s)	Valeria Chiliquinga	Ecuador	61.06	59.49	63.44	60.24	x	62.37	63.44	
4	Silennis Vargas	Venezuela	58.93	61.61	63.13	58.51	57.05	x	63.13	
5	Ludith Campos	Dominican Republic	x	55.36	57.36	60.80	53.87	55.31	60.80	

=== Heptathlon ===
3–4 July

The highest mark recorded in each event is highlighted in yellow

Rank	Name	Nationality	100m H	HJ	SP	200m	LJ	JT	800m	Points	Notes
1st place, gold medalist(s)	Martha Araújo	Colombia	13.53	1.67	12.88	25.22	6.27	47.10	2:22.72	5975	GR
2nd place, silver medalist(s)	Ana Camila Pirelli	Paraguay	13.58	1.61	13.70	24.47	5.38	48.11	2:17.12	5848	
3rd place, bronze medalist(s)	Yessi Tejeda	Dominican Republic	14.55	1.55	11.01	25.46	5.38	45.63	2:59.46	4832	
4	Joyce Micolta	Ecuador	14.55	1.64	11.67	DQ	5.63	35.86	2:23.57	4426	
5	Marienger Chirinos	Venezuela	20.38	1.55	11.23	26.56	5.58	29.48	2:38.30	4091	

== Mixed results ==
=== 4 × 400 metres relay ===
1 July

Rank	Lane	Team	Name	Time	Notes
1st place, gold medalist(s)	6	Dominican Republic	Juander Santos, Mariana Pérez, Robert King, Anabel Medina	3:19.50	GR
2nd place, silver medalist(s)	5	Colombia	Nicolás Salinas, Evelis Aguilar, Gustavo Barrios, Rosangelica Escobar	3:20.30	
3rd place, bronze medalist(s)	4	Venezuela	Javier Gómez, Orangy Jiménez, José Antonio Maita, Ibeyis Romero	3:22.68	
4	3	Ecuador	Nicole Caicedo, Evelin Mercado, Steeven Salas, Alan Minda	3:26.49	
