= Billy Julio =

Colombian javelin thrower (born 1996)

Personal information
- Full name: Billy Williams Julio López
- Born: February 14, 1996 (age 30) Maracaibo, Venezuela

Sport
- Country: Colombia
- Sport: Athletics
- Event: Javelin throw

Achievements and titles
- Personal best: Javelin throw: 81.99 m (2025)
Medal record
Men's athletics
Event	1st	2nd	3rd
CAC Games	0	0	1
South American Games	0	1	1
South American Championships	0	2	0
Bolivarian Games	1	0	1
Total	1	3	3
Representing Colombia
Central American and Caribbean Games
Bronze medal – third place	2026 Santo Domingo	Javelin throw
South American Games
Silver medal – second place	2022 Asunción	Javelin throw
Bronze medal – third place	2026 Santa Fe	Javelin throw
South American Championships
Silver medal – second place	2023 São Paulo	Javelin throw
Silver medal – second place	2025 Mar del Plata	Javelin throw
Bolivarian Games
Gold medal – first place	2025 Lima-Ayacucho	Javelin throw
Representing Venezuela
Bolivarian Games
Bronze medal – third place	2017 Santa Marta	Javelin throw
- Updated on 16 March 2026

Billy Williams Julio López (born 14 February 1996) is a Colombian athlete specialising in the javelin throw. He has won several medals at regional level.

Before turning to athletics he played baseball. He switched allegiance from his native Venezuela in February 2022.

His personal best in the event is 81.99 metres set in Lima in 2025. His throw of 77.94 metres from 2019 is the standing Venezuelan record.

== International competitions ==
Year	Competition	Venue	Position	Event	Notes
Representing Venezuela
2017	Bolivarian Games	Santa Marta, Colombia	3rd	Javelin throw	70.77 m
2018	South American U23 Championships	Cuenca, Ecuador	4th	Javelin throw	67.15 m
2021	South American Championships	Guayaquil, Ecuador	—N/a	Javelin throw	DQ
Representing Colombia
2022	Ibero-American Championships	La Nucia, Spain	5th	Javelin throw	77.65 m
2022	Bolivarian Games	Valledupar, Colombia	4th	Javelin throw	72.01 m
2022	South American Games	Asunción, Paraguay	2nd	Javelin throw	74.38 m
2023	Central American and Caribbean Games	San Salvador, El Salvador	5th	Javelin throw	74.20 m
2023	South American Championships	São Paulo, Brazil	2nd	Javelin throw	78.72 m
2023	Pan American Games	Santiago, Chile	6th	Javelin throw	73.35 m
2024	Ibero-American Championships	Cuiabá, Brazil	4th	Javelin throw	77.83 m
2025	South American Championships	Mar del Plata, Argentina	2nd	Javelin throw	76.73 m
2025	World Championships	Tokyo, Japan	34th (q)	Javelin throw	76.01 m
2025	Bolivarian Games	Lima, Peru	1st	Javelin throw	81.99 m GR
2026	Ibero-American Championships	Lima, Peru	5th	Javelin throw	74.66 m
2026	Pan American Championships	Medellín, Colombia	5th	Javelin throw	77.61 m
2026	Central American and Caribbean Games	Santo Domingo, Dominican Republic	3rd	Javelin throw	81.02 m
2026	South American Games	Santa Fe, Argentina	3rd	Javelin throw	80.78 m
