= Athletics at the 2025 Bolivarian Games =

Athletics competitions at the 2025 Bolivarian Games

- Venue: Villa Deportiva Nacional
- Dates: 23 November – 6 December
- Competitors: 219 from 11 nations

Athletics competitions at the 2025 Bolivarian Games in Lima, Peru were held from 23 November to 6 December 2025 at the Villa Deportiva Nacional, with the marathon and walks held on the streets of Lima.

== Medal summary ==
=== Men's events ===
Event	Gold		Silver		Bronze	
100 metres Wind: +0.1 m/s	Ronal Longa; Colombia	10.29	David Vivas; Venezuela	10.43	Alexis Nieves; Venezuela	10.50
200 metres Wind: -1.8 m/s	Katriel Angulo; Ecuador	20.63	Ronal Longa; Colombia	20.83	César Almirón; Paraguay	20.99
400 metres	Kelvis Padrino; Venezuela	45.71	Javier Gómez; Venezuela	45.87	Anderson Marquínez; Ecuador	46.51
800 metres	Chamar Chambers; Panama	1:46.95	José Antonio Maita; Venezuela	1:47.45	Rafael Muñoz; Chile	1:47.56
1500 metres	Esteban González; Chile	3:49.78	Luis Huamán; Peru	3:50.04	Juan Ignacio Peña; Chile	3:50.28
5000 metres	José Luis Rojas; Peru	13:41.34 GR	Luis Masabanda; Ecuador	13:42.92	Diego Uribe; Chile	13:47.82
10,000 metres	Walter Nina; Peru	28:42.66 GR	Carlos Díaz; Chile	28:53.08	Jhonatan Molina; Peru	28:55.58
Marathon	Ferdinand Cereceda; Peru	2:16:38	Ulises Ambrosio; Peru	2:16:41	Fernando Moreno; Ecuador	2:18:17
110 metres hurdles Wind: -2.1 m/s	Marcos Herrera; Ecuador	13.97	Yohan Chaverra; Colombia	14.18	Cristian Rodríguez; Dominican Republic	14.39
400 metres hurdles	Yeral Núñez; Dominican Republic	50.81	Sebastián Mosquera; Colombia	51.53	Ian Andrey Pata; Ecuador	51.62
3000 metres steeplechase	Carlos San Martín; Colombia	8:38.27	Diddier Rodríguez; Panama	8:43.29	Víctor Aguilar; Bolivia	9:08.19
4 × 100 metres relay	Colombia; Ronal Longa; Enoc Moreno; Pedro Agualimpia; Deiner Guaitoto	38.73 GR	Dominican Republic; Lidio Andrés Feliz; Melbin Marcelino; Christopher Melenciano; Yancarlos Martínez	39.20	Venezuela; Alexis Nieves; David Vivas; Eubrig Maza; Ángel Alvarado	39.31
4 × 400 metres relay	Venezuela; Axel Gómez; Javier Gómez; José Antonio Maita; Kelvis Padrino	3:04.00 GR	Ecuador; Katriel Angulo; Anderson Marquínez; Ian Andrey Pata; Francisco Tejeda	3:06.07 NR	Dominican Republic; Yeral Núñez; Lidio Andrés Feliz; Christopher Melenciano; Wilbert Encarnación	3:06.52
Half marathon walk	Jordy Jiménez; Ecuador	1:25:39 GR, NR	Luis Henry Campos; Peru	1:26:08 NR	Éider Arévalo; Colombia	1:26:39 NR
Marathon walk	César Herrera; Colombia	3:15:49 GR, NR	Luis Henry Campos; Peru	3:17:09 NR	Erick Barrondo; Guatemala	3:18:41
Pole vault	Ricardo Montes de Oca; Venezuela	5.20	Cristóbal Núñez; Chile	5.20	Guillermo Correa; Chile	4.90
Long jump	Arnovis Dalmero; Colombia	7.88	José Luis Mandros; Peru	7.87	Eubrig Maza; Venezuela	7.69
Triple jump	Leodan Torrealba; Venezuela	16.59	Geiner Moreno; Colombia	16.39	William Landinez; Venezuela	16.14
Shot put	Ronald Grueso; Colombia	19.13 PB	Matías Puschel; Chile	18.47	Jhon Zea; Colombia	18.41
Discus throw	Juan José Caicedo; Ecuador	61.43 GR	Claudio Romero; Chile	59.71	Lucas Nervi; Chile	59.65
Javelin throw	Billy Julio; Colombia	81.99 GR, PB	Lars Flaming; Paraguay	79.28	Carlos Rospigliosi; Peru	66.00
Decathlon	Julio Angulo; Colombia	8089 GR, NR	Gerson Izaguirre; Venezuela	7798	Carlos Córdoba; Venezuela	7484

=== Women's events ===
Event	Gold		Silver		Bronze	
100 metres Wind: -0.3 m/s	Liranyi Alonso; Dominican Republic	11.40	Ángela Tenorio; Ecuador	11.61	Anahí Suárez; Ecuador	11.61
200 metres Wind: -0.4 m/s	Nicole Caicedo; Ecuador	23.09	Anahí Suárez; Ecuador	23.32	María Maturana; Colombia	23.55
400 metres	Lina Licona; Colombia	51.83 GR	Cristal Cuervo; Panama	53.96	Génesis Cañola; Ecuador	54.04
800 metres	Berdine Castillo; Chile	2:03.54	Karla Vélez; Colombia	2:04.81	Valeria Cabezas; Colombia	2:04.85 PB
1500 metres	Anita Poma; Peru	4:19.62	Javiera Faletto; Chile	4:21.53	Verónica Huacasi; Peru	4:22.70
5000 metres	Edymar Brea; Venezuela	16:08.45	Benita Parra; Bolivia	16:08.95	Saida Meneses; Peru	16:09.61
10,000 metres	Edymar Brea; Venezuela	35:00.47	Thalia Valdivia; Peru	35:00.86	Saida Meneses; Peru	35:02.11
Marathon	Silvia Ortiz; Ecuador	2:34:54	Sheyla Paucar; Peru	2:35:10	Zarita Suárez; Peru	2:36:07
100 metres hurdles Wind: -1.3 m/s	Martha Araújo; Colombia	13.40	Maribel Caicedo; Ecuador	13.44	María Alejandra Rocha; Colombia	13.97
4 × 100 metres relay	Colombia; Angélica Gamboa; María Maturana; Marlet Ospino; Danna Banquez	44.00	Dominican Republic; Fiordaliza Cofil; Patricia Sine; Milagros Durán; Liranyi Alonso	44.23	Chile; Anaís Hernández; Antonia Ramírez; Macarena Borie; Javiera Cañas	45.08
4 × 400 metres relay	Colombia; Karla Vélez; Lina Licona; María Alejandra Rocha; Paola Loboa	3:34.10 GR	Dominican Republic; Bianka Acosta; Estrella de Aza; Patricia Sine; Milagros Durán	3:37.56	Venezuela; María Rojas; Nahomy García; Waleska Ortiz; Ana Torin	3:39.78
Half marathon walk	Kimberly García; Peru	1:35:10 GR, NR	Mary Luz Andía; Peru	1:40:25	Magaly Bonilla; Ecuador	1:42:10
High jump	Hellen Tenorio; Colombia	1.89 PB	María Arboleda; Colombia; Glenka Antonia; Curaçao	1.80 1.86	Not awarded	
Long jump	Natalia Linares; Colombia	6.95 GR, AU23R, NR	Martha Araújo; Colombia	6.63	Ornelis Ortiz; Venezuela	6.36
Triple jump	Valeria Quispe; Bolivia	13.48	Adriana Chila; Ecuador	13.33	Silvana Segura; Peru	12.98
Shot put	Rosa Ramírez; Dominican Republic	17.44	Ivana Gallardo; Chile	17.22	Ahymara Espinoza; Venezuela	17.05
Discus throw	Yerlin Mesa; Colombia	53.78	Karen Gallardo; Chile	52.80	Ottaynis Febres; Venezuela	50.24
Hammer throw	Rosa Rodríguez; Venezuela	69.97	Mayra Gaviria; Colombia	68.06	Ximena Zorrilla; Peru	66.22
Heptathlon	Damaris Palomeque; Colombia	5420	Daniela Medrano; Peru	4587	Not awarded	

=== Mixed events ===
Event	Gold		Silver		Bronze	
4 × 100 metres relay	Ecuador; Nicole Caicedo; Anahí Suárez; Katriel Angulo; Anderson Marquínez	41.52 GR, NR	Colombia; Angélica Gamboa; Marlet Ospino; Enoc Moreno; Deiner Guaitoto	42.05 NR	Paraguay; Jonathan Wolk; Xenia Hiebert; Macarena Giménez; Fredy Maidana	42.22
4 × 400 metres relay	Colombia; Lina Licona; Paola Loboa; Bernardo Baloyes; Daniel Balanta	3:20.08	Venezuela; Javier Gómez; Kelvis Padrino; Nahomy García; Waleska Ortiz	3:20.44	Dominican Republic; Bianka Acosta; Estrella de Aza; Juander Santos; Ferdy Agramonte	3:20.72

== Medal table ==
* Host nation (Peru)

Rank	Nation	Gold	Silver	Bronze	Total
1	Colombia	17	9	5	31
2	Ecuador	7	6	6	19
3	Venezuela	7	5	9	21
4	Peru*	5	9	8	22
5	Dominican Republic	3	3	3	9
6	Chile	2	7	6	15
7	Panama	1	2	0	3
8	Bolivia	1	1	1	3
9	Paraguay	0	1	2	3
10	Curaçao	0	1	0	1
Totals (10 entries)		43	44	40	127

== Participating nations ==
- Bolivia (18)
- Chile (24)
- Colombia (39)
- Curaçao (1)
- Dominican Republic (19)
- Ecuador (24)
- Guatemala (4)
- Panama (5)
- Paraguay (7)
- Peru (48)
- Venezuela (30)
