= Martha Araújo (athlete) =

Colombian athlete

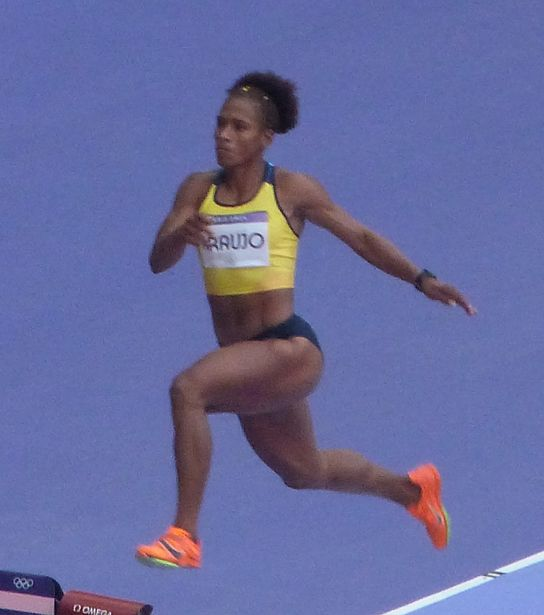

Personal information
- Full name: Martha Valeria Araújo Sinisterra
- Born: May 12, 1996 (age 30) Tumaco, Nariño Department, Colombia
- Height: 1.72 m (5 ft 8 in)
- Weight: 66 kg (146 lb)

Sport
- Country: Colombia
- Sport: Athletics
- Events: 100 metres hurdles; Long jump; Pentathlon; Heptathlon

Achievements and titles
- Personal bests: 100 m hurdles: 12.91 (2024); Long jump: 6.71 m (2026); Heptathlon: 6475 pts AR (2025)
Medal record
Representing Colombia
Women's athletics
| Event | 1st | 2nd | 3rd |
|---|---|---|---|
| World Combined Events Tour meetings | 2 | 0 | 1 |
| Pan American Games | 0 | 0 | 1 |
| Ibero-American Championships | 2 | 0 | 0 |
| CAC Games | 0 | 1 | 0 |
| South American Games | 1 | 1 | 0 |
| South American Championships | 2 | 1 | 1 |
| South American Indoor Championships | 0 | 1 | 0 |
| Bolivarian Games | 2 | 2 | 0 |
| South American U23 Championships | 1 | 0 | 0 |
| Total | 10 | 6 | 3 |
Pan American Games
| Bronze medal – third place | 2019 Lima | Heptathlon |
Ibero-American Championships
| Gold medal – first place | 2022 Alicante | Heptathlon |
| Gold medal – first place | 2024 Cuiabá | Heptathlon |
Central American and Caribbean Games
| Silver medal – second place | 2023 San Salvador | Heptathlon |
South American Games
| Gold medal – first place | 2022 Asunción | Heptathlon |
| Silver medal – second place | 2018 Cochabamba | Heptathlon |
South American Championships
| Gold medal – first place | 2023 São Paulo | Heptathlon |
| Gold medal – first place | 2025 Mar del Plata | Heptathlon |
| Silver medal – second place | 2021 Guayaquil | Heptathlon |
| Bronze medal – third place | 2019 Lima | Heptathlon |
South American Indoor Championships
| Silver medal – second place | 2026 Cochabamba | Long jump |
Bolivarian Games
| Gold medal – first place | 2022 Valledupar | Heptathlon |
| Gold medal – first place | 2025 Lima-Ayacucho | 100 m hurdles |
| Silver medal – second place | 2017 Santa Marta | Heptathlon |
| Silver medal – second place | 2025 Lima-Ayacucho | Long jump |
South American U23 Championships
| Gold medal – first place | 2018 Cuenca | Heptathlon |
- Updated on 24 March 2026

Martha Valeria Araújo Sinisterra (born 12 May 1996) is a Colombian athlete competing in the Heptathlon. She represented her country at the 2023 World Championships in Budapest without finishing the competition. In addition, she has won multiple medals on regional level.

== Biography ==
In 2013, she was the national under-18 champion in the long jump and triple jump and placed 13th in the long jump at the South American Junior Championships (under-20).

In 2017 she made her debut in the national team, representing Colombia at the Bolivarian Games in Santa Marta and winning the silver medal in the heptathlon . The following year she won the silver medal, again in the heptathlon, at the South American Games in Cochabamba and placed fourth at the Central American and Caribbean Games in Barranquilla.

At the 2019 South American Championships in Lima, he won the bronze medal in the heptathlon, the same result he achieved shortly after at the Pan American Games, also held in Lima, Peru.

In 2021 he placed second on the podium at the South American Championships in Guayaquil, while in 2022 he won three gold medals in the heptathlon: at the Ibero-American Championships in La Nucia, at the Bolivarian Games in Valledupar and at the South American Games in Asunción.

== International competitions ==
| Year | Competition | Venue | Position | Event | Notes |
Representing Colombia
| 2013 | Pan American U20 Championships | Medellín, Colombia | 13th | Long jump | 5.46 m |
| 2017 | Bolivarian Games | Santa Marta, Colombia | 2nd | Heptathlon | 5703 pts |
2018
| 2018 | Multistars | Florence, Italy | 11th | Heptathlon | 5564 pts |
| 2018 | South American Games | Cochabamba, Bolivia | 2nd | Heptathlon | 5719 pts |
| 2018 | Central American and Caribbean Games | Barranquilla, Colombia | 4th | Heptathlon | 5744 pts |
| 2018 | South American U23 Championships | Cuenca, Ecuador | 1st | Heptathlon | 5818 pts |
| 2019 | South American Championships | Lima, Peru | 3rd | Heptathlon | 5708 pts |
| 2019 | Pan American Games | Lima, Peru | 3rd | Heptathlon | 5925 pts |
| 2021 | South American Championships | Guayaquil, Ecuador | 2nd | Heptathlon | 5866 pts |
| 2022 | Ibero-American Championships | La Nucia, Spain | 1st | Heptathlon | 5951 pts |
| 2022 | Bolivarian Games | Valledupar, Colombia | 1st | Heptathlon | 5975 pts GR |
| 2022 | South American Games | Asunción, Paraguay | 1st | Heptathlon | 6112 pts GR |
| 2023 | Central American and Caribbean Games | San Salvador, El Salvador | 2nd | Heptathlon | 5960 pts |
| 2023 | South American Championships | São Paulo, Brazil | 1st | Heptathlon | 5785 pts |
| 2023 | World Championships | Budapest, Hungary | —N/a | Heptathlon | DNF |
| 2024 | Ibero-American Championships | Cuiabá, Brazil | 1st | Heptathlon | 6274 pts CR |
| 2024 | Olympic Games | Paris, France | 7th | Heptathlon | 6386 pts AR |
| 2024 | Décastar | Talence, France | 1st | Heptathlon | 6429 pts AR |
| 2025 | South American Championships | Mar del Plata, Argentina | 1st | Heptathlon | 6396 pts WL, CR |
| 2025 | Hypo-Meeting | Götzis, Austria | 3rd | Heptathlon | 6475 pts AR |
| 2025 | Décastar | Talence, France | 1st | Heptathlon | 6451 pts |
| 2025 | World Championships | Tokyo, Japan | 10th | Heptathlon | 6324 pts |
| 2025 | Bolivarian Games | Lima, Peru | 1st | 100 m hurdles | 13.40 s |
| 2025 | Bolivarian Games | Lima, Peru | 2nd | Long jump | 6.63 m |
| 2026 | South American Indoor Championships | Cochabamba, Bolivia | —N/a | 4 × 400 m relay | DQ |
| 2026 | South American Indoor Championships | Cochabamba, Bolivia | 2nd | Long jump | 6.71 m |
| 2026 | World Indoor Championships | Toruń, Poland | —N/a | Pentathlon | DNF |
| 2026 | Pan American Championships | Medellín, Colombia | 6th | 100 m hurdles | 13.40 s |
| 2026 | Pan American Championships | Medellín, Colombia | 4th | Long jump | 6.47 m |
| 2026 | Central American and Caribbean Games | Santo Domingo, Dominican Republic | —N/a | Heptathlon | DNF |

== Personal bests ==
=== Outdoor ===
- 200 metres – 24.11 (+1.5 m/s, Talence 2025)
- 400 metres – 55.08 (Bogotá 2025)
- 800 metres – 2:15.89 (Götzis 2025)
- 60 metres hurdles – 8.25 (Indoor, Toruń 2026)
- 100 metres hurdles – 12.91 (+1.2 m/s, Cuiabá 2024)
- High jump – 1.76 m (Talence 2025)
- Long jump – 6.71 m (Indoor, Cochabamba 2026)
- Triple jump – 11.74 m (+0.0 m/s, Monterrey 2014)
- Shot put – 14.15 m (Paris 2024)
- Javelin throw – 54.22 m (Asunción 2022)
- Heptathlon – 6475 pts AR (Götzis 2025)
- 4 × 100 metres relay – 45.43 (Armenia 2025)
- 4 × 400 metres relay – 3:33.43 (Bogotá 2025)
