= Lina Licona =

Colombian athlete (born 1998)

Personal information
- Full name: Lina Esther Licona
- Born: 1 October 1998 (age 28) Montería, Colombia

Sport
- Sport: Athletics
- Events: 100 metres; 200 metres; 400 metres; 4×100 metres; 4×400 metres; Mixed relay
- Coached by: Mauricio Hernández

Achievements and titles
- Personal bests: 100 metres: 11.50 (2023); 200 metres: 22.70 NR (2024); 400 metres: 50.75 (2026); 4×100 metres: 44.16 (2023); 4×400 metres: 3:29.01 NR (2026); Mixed relay: 3:14.42 AR (2025)
Medal record
Representing Colombia
Women's athletics
Event	1st	2nd	3rd
Pan American Championships	1	1	1
Ibero-American Championships	0	4	0
CAC Games	0	1	2
South American Games	2	2	1
South American Championships	4	2	0
Bolivarian Games	3	0	0
South American U23 Championships	1	0	0
Total	11	10	4
Pan American Championships
Gold medal – first place	2026 Medellín	4×400 m relay
Silver medal – second place	2026 Medellín	Mixed relay
Bronze medal – third place	2026 Medellín	400 m
Ibero-American Championships
Silver medal – second place	2024 Cuiabá	4×400 m relay
Silver medal – second place	2026 Lima	400 m
Silver medal – second place	2026 Lima	4×400 m relay
Silver medal – second place	2026 Lima	Mixed relay
Central American and Caribbean Games
Silver medal – second place	2026 Santo Domingo	4×400 m relay
Bronze medal – third place	2023 San Salvador	4×400 m relay
Bronze medal – third place	2023 San Salvador	Mixed relay
South American Games
Gold medal – first place	2022 Asunción	4×400 m relay
Gold medal – first place	2026 Santa Fe	4×400 m relay
Silver medal – second place	2026 Santa Fe	Mixed 4 x 400 m relay
Silver medal – second place	2026 Santa Fe	400 m
Bronze medal – third place	2022 Asunción	Mixed relay
South American Championships
Gold medal – first place	2019 Lima	4×400 m relay
Gold medal – first place	2023 São Paulo	4×400 m relay
Gold medal – first place	2023 São Paulo	Mixed relay
Gold medal – first place	2025 Mar del Plata	4×400 m relay
Silver medal – second place	2019 Lima	400 m
Silver medal – second place	2025 Mar del Plata	Mixed relay
Bolivarian Games
Gold medal – first place	2025 Lima-Ayacucho	400 m
Gold medal – first place	2025 Lima-Ayacucho	4×400 m relay
Gold medal – first place	2025 Lima-Ayacucho	Mixed relay
South American U23 Championships
Gold medal – first place	2018 Cuenca	4×400 m relay

Lina Esther Licona Torres (born 1 October 1998) is a Colombian sprinter. In 2024, she became national champion in the 400 metres.

== Early and personal life ==
From Boca de La Ceiba, near Montería in the Córdoba Department. Licona moved to Bogotá with her family in 2004. She attended high school at the Instituto Tecnisistemas. She was a speed skater prior to focusing on athletics when she was 16 years-old. She has a son, Eliam, born February 15, 2017. She suffered an injury to her Achilles tendon in 2020 that left her close to retirement.

== Career ==
She won a silver medal in the individual 400 metres at the 2019 South American Athletics Championships in Lima, Peru. She won a gold medal in the 4x400m relay at the championships.

She won gold in the womwn's 4x400m relay and bronze in the mixed 4x400m relay at the 2022 South American Games in Asunción, Paraguay.

She won double gold at the 2023 South American Athletics Championships in São Paulo, in the women’s 4x400m relay and the mixed 4x400m relay, in a South American record time.

She ran as part of the Colombian mixed 4x400m relay team at the 2024 World Relays Championships in Nassau. She won the International Grand Prix 400m race in Cuiabá, Brazil in May 2024, running a season best time of 52.28 seconds.

On June 20, 2024 Licona secured automatic qualification for the Paris 2024 Olympic Games by winning the 400 metres at the Richard Boroto International Grand Prix in Quito, Ecuador in a time of 50.83 seconds. The following week, she won the Colombian Athletics Championships 400 metres race in a time of 51.68 seconds. She competed at the 2024 Summer Olympics over 400 metres in August 2024.

== International competitions ==
Year	Competition	Venue	Position	Event	Result
Representing Colombia
2018	South American U23 Championships	Cuenca, Ecuador	1st	4 × 400 m relay	3:35.50 CR
2019	South American Championships	Lima, Peru	2nd	400 m	53.18 s
2019	South American Championships	Lima, Peru	1st	4 × 400 m relay	3:32.81
2019	Pan American Games	Lima, Peru	11th	400 m	53.53 s
2019	Pan American Games	Lima, Peru	6th	4 × 400 m relay	3:33.02
2022	South American Games	Asunción, Paraguay	1st	4 × 400 m relay	3:31.30 GR
2022	South American Games	Asunción, Paraguay	3rd	Mixed relay	3:22.87
2023	Central American and Caribbean Games	San Salvador, El Salvador	8th	200 m	23.69 s
2023	Central American and Caribbean Games	San Salvador, El Salvador	—N/a	4 × 100 m relay	DQ
2023	Central American and Caribbean Games	San Salvador, El Salvador	3rd	4 × 400 m relay	3:31.16
2023	Central American and Caribbean Games	San Salvador, El Salvador	3rd	Mixed relay	3:20.36
2023	South American Championships	São Paulo, Brazil	1st	4 × 400 m relay	3:31.39
2023	South American Championships	São Paulo, Brazil	1st	Mixed relay	3:14.79 AR, CR
2023	Pan American Games	Santiago, Chile	—N/a	200 m	DQ
2023	Pan American Games	Santiago, Chile	6th	4 × 100 m relay	44.79 s
2023	Pan American Games	Santiago, Chile	6th	Mixed relay	3:23.17
2024	World Relays	Nassau, Bahamas	19th (r)	Mixed relay	3:21.29
2024	Ibero-American Championships	Cuiabá, Brazil	5th	200 m	23.45 s
2024	Ibero-American Championships	Cuiabá, Brazil	2nd	4 × 400 m relay	3:33.20
2024	Olympic Games	Paris, France	19th (r)	400 m	51.90 s
2025	South American Championships	Mar del Plata, Argentina	4th	200 m	23.30 s w
2025	South American Championships	Mar del Plata, Argentina	1st	4 × 400 m relay	3:33.29
2025	South American Championships	Mar del Plata, Argentina	2nd	Mixed relay	3:19.18
2025	Bolivarian Games	Lima, Peru	1st	400 m	51.83 s GR
2025	Bolivarian Games	Lima, Peru	1st	4 × 400 m relay	3:34.10 GR
2025	Bolivarian Games	Lima, Peru	1st	Mixed relay	3:20.08
2026	Ibero-American Championships	Lima, Peru	2nd	400 m	51.42 s
2026	Ibero-American Championships	Lima, Peru	2nd	4 × 400 m relay	3:30.44
2026	Ibero-American Championships	Lima, Peru	2nd	Mixed relay	3:17.83
2026	Pan American Championships	Medellín, Colombia	3rd	400 m	50.75 s
2026	Pan American Championships	Medellín, Colombia	1st	4 × 400 m relay	3:29.49 NR
2026	Pan American Championships	Medellín, Colombia	2nd	Mixed relay	3:15.36
2026	Central American and Caribbean Games	Santo Domingo, Dominican Republic	7th	400 m	52.82 s
2026	Central American and Caribbean Games	Santo Domingo, Dominican Republic	2nd	4 × 400 m relay	3:29.01 NR
2026	Central American and Caribbean Games	Santo Domingo, Dominican Republic	4th	Mixed relay	3:16.60
2026	South American Games	Santa Fe, Argentina	2nd	400 m	52.38 s
2026	South American Games	Santa Fe, Argentina	1st	4 × 400 m relay	3:32.21
2026	South American Games	Santa Fe, Argentina	2nd	Mixed relay	3:17.78
