= Athletics at the 2022 Bolivarian Games =

Athletics competitions at the 2022 Bolivarian Games

- Athletics pictogram
- Venue: Estadio de Atletismo José Luis Parada; Vías Públicas Departamentales
- Dates: 1–5 July
- Competitors: 225 from 9 nations

Athletics competitions at the 2022 Bolivarian Games in Valledupar, Colombia were held from 1 to 5 July 2022 at the Athletics Stadium in the Centro de Alto Rendimiento Deportivo La Gota Fría cluster, with the marathon and walks held at Vías Públicas Departamentales.

Forty nine medal events were originally scheduled to be contested; 48 events equally divided among men and women plus a 4 × 400 metres relay mixed event. However, on 30 June 2022, during the technical congress held prior to the start of the competitions the following events were cancelled due to lack of athletes: shot put, discus throw and hammer throw for men and 3000 metres steeplechase and javelin throw for women, reducing the total medal events to 44. A total of 240 athletes will compete in the events. The events were open competitions without age restrictions.

Colombia were the athletics competitions defending champions having won them in the previous edition in Santa Marta 2017.

== Participating nations ==
A total of 9 nations (all the 7 ODEBO nations and 2 invited) registered athletes for the athletics competitions. Each nation was able to enter a maximum of 85 athletes; up to 2 men and 2 women for the individual events and one team for each relay event:

- Bolivia (7 athletes)
- Chile (30)
- Colombia (53)
- Dominican Republic (18)
- Ecuador (34)
- Panama (11)
- Paraguay (8)
- Peru (30)
- Venezuela (34)

== Venues ==
The athletics competitions were held in two venues, both in Valledupar. Road events (marathons and racewalks) took place at Vías Públicas Departamentales, while track and field events were held at Estadio de Atletismo José Luis Parada located within the Centro de Alto Rendimiento Deportivo La Gota Fría. The athletics stadium track has a World Athletics "Class 2 certificate", which was equipped by the Italian company Mondo.

== Medal summary ==
=== Medal table ===
* Host nation (Colombia)

Rank	Nation	Gold	Silver	Bronze	Total
1	Colombia*	14	12	10	36
2	Ecuador	8	3	10	21
3	Peru	5	6	7	18
4	Chile	5	5	7	17
5	Dominican Republic	5	3	5	13
6	Venezuela	3	9	2	14
7	Panama	3	1	1	5
8	Bolivia	1	3	0	4
9	Paraguay	0	2	2	4
Totals (9 entries)		44	44	44	132

Source: Bolivarianos Valledupar 2022 – Athletics medals

=== Medal summary ===
==== Men's events ====
Event	Gold		Silver		Bronze	
100 metres	Alonso Edward; Panama	10.17 SB	Christopher Valdez; Dominican Republic	10.18 SB	Carlos Palacios; Colombia	10.23
200 metres	Alonso Edward; Panama	20.41	Erick Sánchez; Dominican Republic	20.64 SB	Melbin Marcelino; Dominican Republic	20.85
400 metres	Robert King; Dominican Republic	46.47 SB	Kelvis Padrino; Venezuela	46.96	Gustavo Barrios; Colombia	47.24
800 metres	Jelssin Robledo; Colombia	1:48.05 SB	José Antonio Maita; Venezuela	1:48.57	Marco Vilca; Peru	1:48.77
1500 metres	Carlos San Martín; Colombia	3:42.91 GR, SB	David Ninavia; Bolivia	3:43.60 SB	Esteban González; Chile	3:44.29
5000 metres	Carlos Díaz; Chile	14:34.59	Vidal Basco; Bolivia	14:35.21	Iván Darío González; Colombia	14:35.70
10,000 metres	Vidal Basco; Bolivia	29:40.80	Héctor Garibay; Bolivia	29:42.54 SB	Ignacio Velásquez; Chile	29:59.96
110 metres hurdles	Fanor Escobar; Colombia	13.55 SB	Brayan Rojas; Colombia	14.06	Martín Sáenz; Chile	14.13
400 metres hurdles	Juander Santos; Dominican Republic	50.05 GR	Alfredo Sepúlveda; Chile	50.25 SB	Fanor Escobar; Colombia	50.62 SB
3000 metres steeplechase	Carlos San Martín; Colombia	8:44.62	Julio Palomino; Peru	8:48.97	Yuri Labra; Peru	9:07.17
4 × 100 metres relay	Dominican Republic (DOM); José González; Melbin Marcelino; Erick Sánchez; Christopher Valdez	39.26	Venezuela (VEN); Bryant Álamo; Abdel Kalil Hernández; Rafael Vásquez; David Vivas	39.75	Paraguay (PAR); César Almirón; Nilo Dure; Fredy Maidana; Jonathan Wolk	39.90
4 × 400 metres relay	Colombia (COL); Gustavo Barrios; Raúl Mena; Jelssin Robledo; Jhonatan Rodríguez	3:06.61	Venezuela (VEN); Javier Gómez; José Antonio Maita; Kelvis Padrino; Julio José Rodríguez	3:07.28	Dominican Republic (DOM); Robert King; Melbin Marcelino; José Miguel Paulino; Juander Santos	3:08.11
Half marathon	Rafael Loza; Ecuador	1:06:34.82 GR	Ferdinan Cereceda; Peru	1:06:49.33	Christian Vasconez; Ecuador	1:07:05.60
20 kilometres race walk	Jordy Jiménez; Ecuador	1:28:54	José Leonardo Montaña; Colombia	1:29:09	Manuel Esteban Soto; Colombia	1:31:41
35 kilometres race walk	César Rodríguez; Peru	2:43:44 GR	Diego Pinzón; Colombia	2:44:21	Luis Henry Campos; Peru	2:45:02
High jump	Nicolás Numair; Chile	2.18 m =SB	Gilmar Correa; Colombia	2.18 m SB	Pedro Álamos; Chile	2.10 m
Pole vault	Dyander Pacho; Ecuador	5.40 m GR, SB	Austin Ramos; Ecuador	5.30 m SB	Walter Viáfara; Colombia	5.20 m =SB
Long jump	Jhon Berrío; Colombia	7.56 m	Santiago Cova; Venezuela	7.56 m	Eubrig Maza; Venezuela	7.40 m
Triple jump	Leodan Torrealba; Venezuela	16.57 m	Geiner Moreno; Colombia	16.11 m	Steeven Palacios; Ecuador	15.93 m SB
Shot put	Cancelled					
Discus throw	Cancelled					
Hammer throw	Cancelled					
Javelin throw	Francisco Muse; Chile	76.71 m SB	Larson Diaz; Paraguay	73.84 m	Arley Ibargüen; Colombia	73.21 m
Decathlon	Andy Preciado; Ecuador	7966 pts GR	Gerson Izaguirre; Venezuela	7731 pts	José Miguel Paulino; Dominican Republic	7452 pts

==== Women's events ====
Event	Gold		Silver		Bronze	
100 metres	Ángela Tenorio; Ecuador	11.14 GR, SB	Anahí Suárez; Ecuador	11.38	Selena Arjona; Ecuador	11.61
200 metres	Shary Vallecilla; Colombia	23.30	Orangy Jiménez; Venezuela	23.45 PB, SB	Anahí Suárez; Ecuador	23.48
400 metres	Evelis Aguilar; Colombia	51.84 GR, SB	Martina Weil; Chile	52.64	Nicole Caicedo; Ecuador	54.36 SB
800 metres	Rosangélica Escobar; Colombia	2:04.63 SB	Anita Poma; Peru	2:05.57 NR	Andrea Calderón; Ecuador	2:05.89
1500 metres	Joselyn Brea; Venezuela	4:16.64	Muriel Coneo; Colombia	4:17.77	Josefa Quezada; Chile	4:18.07
5000 metres	Josefa Quezada; Chile	17:22.21	Soledad Torre; Peru	17:22.89	Muriel Coneo; Colombia	17:23.45
10,000 metres	Jovana de la Cruz; Peru	34:48.56	Edymar Brea; Venezuela	34:49.59	Soledad Torre; Peru	34:50.29
100 metres hurdles	Yoveinny Mota; Venezuela	13.07 GR	Maribel Caicedo; Ecuador	13.31	Diana Bazalar; Peru	13.62
400 metres hurdles	Gianna Woodruff; Panama	55.32 GR	Valeria Cabezas; Colombia	57.47	Evilin del Carmen; Dominican Republic	58.90
3000 metres steeplechase	Cancelled					
4 × 100 metres relay	Colombia (COL); Angélica Gamboa; Laura Martínez; Evelyn Rivera; Shary Vallecilla	44.52	Chile (CHI); Macarena Borie; Javiera Cañas; Isidora Jiménez; María Ignacia Montt	44.57	Ecuador (ECU); Nicole Caicedo; Evelin Mercado; Anahí Suárez; Virginia Villalba	45.55
4 × 400 metres relay	Colombia (COL); Evelis Aguilar; Johana Arrieta; Rosangélica Escobar; Valeria Cabezas	3:36.91	Chile (CHI); Berdine Castillo; Isidora Jiménez; Martina Weil; Rocio Muñoz	3:36.98	Ecuador (ECU); Nicole Caicedo; Evelin Mercado; Anahí Suárez; Virginia Villalba	3:37.84
Half marathon	Gladys Tejeda; Peru	1:15:13.86	Luz Mery Rojas; Peru	1:15:22.94	Rosa Chacha; Ecuador	1:16:42.38
20 kilometres race walk	Karla Jaramillo; Ecuador	1:38:46	Sandra Galvis; Colombia	1:39:55	Not awarded (only two competitors)	—
35 kilometres race walk	Magaly Bonilla; Ecuador	2:59:55 GR	Arabelly Orjuela; Colombia	3:00:15	Evelyn Inga; Peru	3:04:29
High jump	Jennifer Rodríguez; Colombia	1.84 m	Marysabel Senyu; Dominican Republic	1.84 m	María Fernanda Murillo; Colombia	1.78 m SB
Pole vault	Nicole Hein; Peru	4.05 m SB	Alejandra Arévalo; Peru	4.00 m =SB	Katherine Castillo; Colombia	3.90 m
Long jump	Natalia Linares; Colombia	6.79 m (+2.2 m/s); 6.68 m (+1.8 m/s) GR, AU20R	Nathalee Aranda; Panama	6.38 m SB	Yuliana Angulo; Ecuador	6.24 m
Triple jump	Liuba Zaldívar; Ecuador	13.57 m	Fernanda Maita; Venezuela	13.05 m	Silvana Segura; Peru	12.75 m
Triple jump	Liuba Zaldívar; Ecuador	13.57 m	Fernanda Maita; Venezuela	13.05 m	Ana Paula Argüello; Paraguay	12.67 m
Shot put	Rosa Ramírez; Dominican Republic	17.31 m	Natalia Duco; Chile	16.75 m SB	Ivana Gallardo; Chile	16.52 m
Discus throw	Karen Gallardo; Chile	59.38 m GR	Yerlin Mesa; Colombia	53.37 m	Catalina Bravo; Chile	53.32 m
Hammer throw	Ximena Zorrilla; Peru	66.96 m NR	Mayra Gaviria; Colombia	64.93 m	Valeria Chiliquinga; Ecuador	63.44 m
Javelin throw	Cancelled					
Heptathlon	Martha Araújo; Colombia	5975 pts GR	Ana Camila Pirelli; Paraguay	5848 pts	Yesi Tejeda; Dominican Republic	4832 pts

==== Mixed event ====
Event	Gold		Silver		Bronze	
4 × 400 metres relay	Dominican Republic (DOM); Juander Santos; Mariana Pérez; Robert King; Anabel Medina	3:19.50 GR	Colombia (COL); Nicolás Salinas; Evelis Aguilar; Gustavo Barrios; Rosangélica Escobar	3:20.30	Venezuela (VEN); Javier Gómez; Orangy Jiménez; José Antonio Maita; Ibeyis Romero	3:22.68
