= Karen Gallardo =

Chilean discus thrower

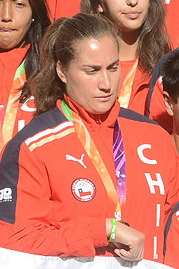
- Gallardo in 2014

Personal information
- Full name: Karen Pamela Gallardo Pinto
- Born: March 6, 1984 (age 42) Valdivia, Los Ríos
- Height: 1.75 m (5 ft 9 in)
- Weight: 95 kg (209 lb)

Sport
- Country: Chile
- Sport: Athletics
- Event: Discus
Medal record
Women's athletics
South American Games
Gold medal – first place	2006 Buenos Aires	Discus throw
Gold medal – first place	2014 Santiago	Discus throw
Bronze medal – third place	2022 Asunción	Discus throw
South American Championships
Silver medal – second place	2009 Lima	Discus throw
Silver medal – second place	2011 Buenos Aires	Discus throw
Silver medal – second place	2021 Guayaquil	Discus throw
Silver medal – second place	2023 São Paulo	Discus throw
Bronze medal – third place	2006 Tunja	Discus throw
Bronze medal – third place	2013 Cartagena	Discus throw
Bronze medal – third place	2017 Asunción	Discus throw
Ibero-American Championships
Gold medal – first place	2014 São Paulo	Discus throw
Silver medal – second place	2008 Iquique	Discus throw
Bronze medal – third place	2012 Barquisimeto	Discus throw
- Updated on 27 January 2015

Karen Pamela Gallardo Pinto (born 6 March 1984 in Valdivia, Los Ríos) is a Chilean athlete. She competed for Chile in discus at the 2012 Summer Olympics. She competed at the 2020 Summer Olympics.

== Personal bests ==
- Shot put: 13.48 m – Santiago de Chile, 24 October 2009
- Discus throw: 61.10 m NR – (Chile) Castellón, 2 August 2015

== Competition record ==
Year	Competition	Venue	Position	Event	Notes
Representing Chile
2004	South American U23 Championships	Barquisimeto, Venezuela	2nd	Discus throw	44.00 m
2006	South American Championships	Tunja, Colombia	7th	Shot put	12.01 m A
2006	South American Championships	Tunja, Colombia	3rd	Discus throw	48.75 m A
2006	South American U23 Championships / South American Games	Buenos Aires, Argentina	1st	Discus throw	52.01 m NR
2007	South American Championships	São Paulo, Brazil	5th	Discus throw	48.94 m
2007	Pan American Games	Rio de Janeiro, Brazil	12th	Discus throw	46.11 m
2008	Ibero-American Championships	Iquique, Chile	2nd	Discus throw	53.10 m NR
2008	Central American and Caribbean Championships	Cali, Colombia	4th (guest)	Discus throw	51.46 m A
2009	ALBA Games	Havana, Cuba	8th	Shot put	13.10 m
2009	ALBA Games	Havana, Cuba	3rd	Discus throw	57.48 m NR
2009	South American Championships	Lima, Peru	6th	Shot put	12.93 m A
2009	South American Championships	Lima, Peru	2nd	Discus throw	55.91 m
2009	Universiade	Belgrade, Serbia	8th	Discus throw	55.38 m
2010	Ibero-American Championships	San Fernando, Spain	4th	Discus throw	54.30 m
2011	South American Championships	Buenos Aires, Argentina	2nd	Discus throw	54.91 m
2011	World Championships	Daegu, South Korea	24th (q)	Discus throw	53.69 m
2011	Pan American Games	Guadalajara, Mexico	5th	Discus throw	57.17 m
2012	Ibero-American Championships	Barquisimeto, Venezuela	3rd	Discus throw	57.40 m
2012	Olympic Games	London, United Kingdom	21st (q)	Discus throw	60.09 m
2013	South American Championships	Cartagena, Colombia	3rd	Discus throw	57.04 m
2013	World Championships	Moscow, Russia	18th (q)	Discus throw	57.03 m
2013	Bolivarian Games	Trujillo, Peru	1st	Discus throw	56.77 m
2014	South American Games	Santiago, Chile	1st	Discus throw	59.65 m
2014	Ibero-American Championships	São Paulo, Brazil	1st	Discus throw	59.66 m
2014	Pan American Sports Festival	Mexico City, Mexico	3rd	Discus throw	58.24m A
2015	South American Championships	Lima, Peru	4th	Discus throw	56.90 m
2015	Pan American Games	Toronto, Canada	5th	Discus throw	59.11 m
2015	World Championships	Beijing, China	22nd (q)	Discus throw	58.32 m
2016	Ibero-American Championships	Rio de Janeiro, Brazil	1st	Discus throw	58.84 m
2016	Olympic Games	Rio de Janeiro, Brazil	18th (q)	Discus throw	57.81 m
2017	South American Championships	Asunción, Paraguay	3rd	Discus throw	59.73 m
2017	World Championships	London, United Kingdom	29th (q)	Discus throw	52.81 m
2017	Bolivarian Games	Santa Marta, Colombia	1st	Discus throw	55.73 m
2019	South American Championships	Lima, Peru	4th	Discus throw	55.09 m
2019	Pan American Games	Lima, Peru	10th	Discus throw	53.42 m
2021	South American Championships	Guayaquil, Ecuador	2nd	Discus throw	59.72 m
2021	Olympic Games	Tokyo, Japan	29th (q)	Discus throw	55.81 m
2022	Ibero-American Championships	La Nucía, Spain	2nd	Discus throw	59.39 m
2022	Bolivarian Games	Valledupar, Colombia	1st	Discus throw	59.38 m
2022	World Championships	Eugene, United States	22nd (q)	Discus throw	57.78 m
2022	South American Games	Asunción, Paraguay	3rd	Discus throw	57.62 m
2023	South American Championships	São Paulo, Brazil	2nd	Discus throw	59.92 m
2023	World Championships	Budapest, Hungary	27th (q)	Discus throw	56.74 m
2023	Pan American Games	Santiago, Chile	9th	Discus throw	55.36 m
2024	Ibero-American Championships	Cuiabá, Brazil	4th	Discus throw	55.96 m
2025	South American Championships	Mar del Plata, Argentina	4th	Discus throw	52.42 m
2025	Bolivarian Games	Lima, Peru	2nd	Discus throw	52.80 m
