= Juander Santos =

Dominican Republic athletics competitor

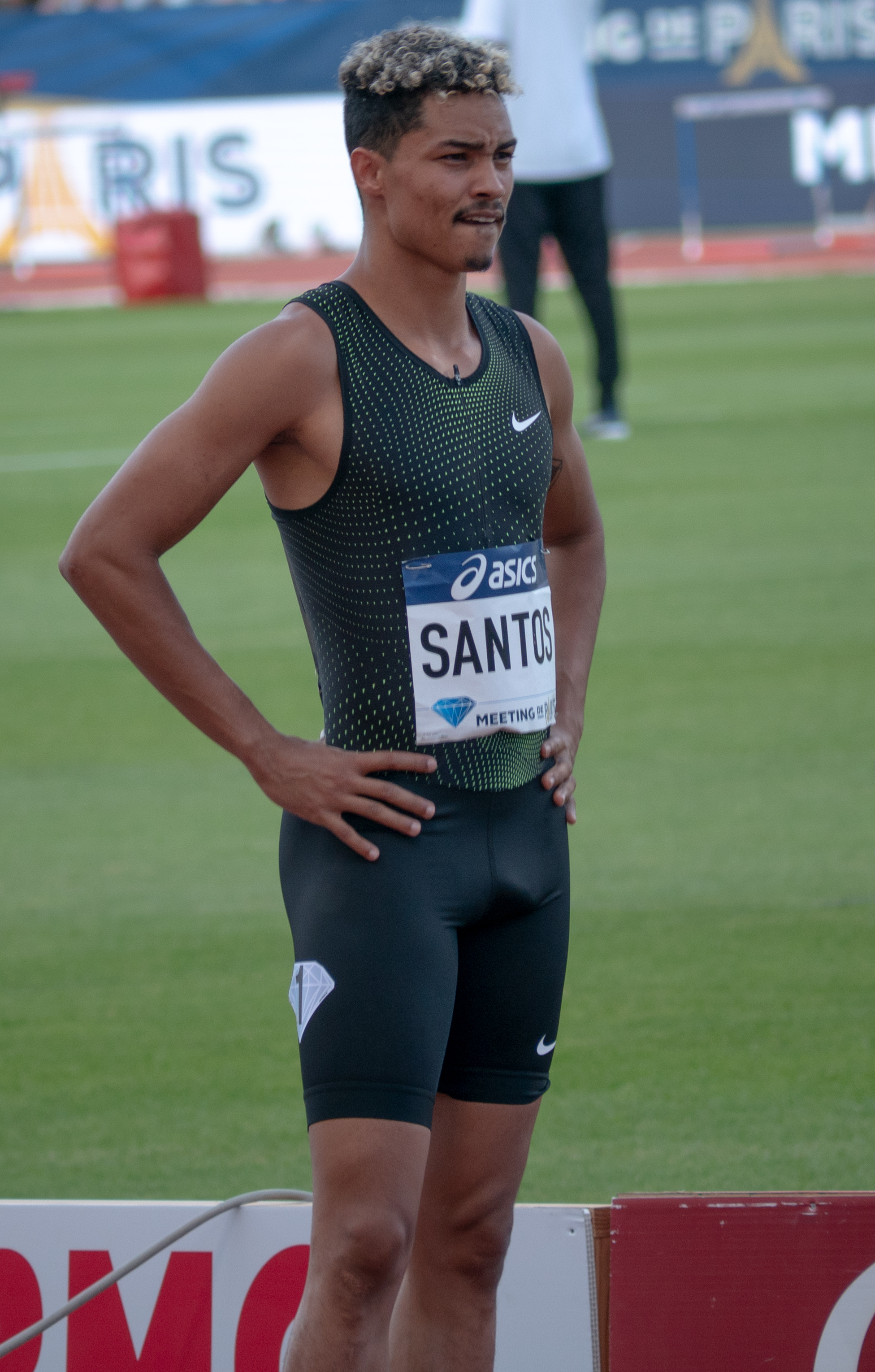
- Juander Santos in 2018

Personal information
- Born: 7 May 1995 (age 31) Bayaguana, Dominican Republic
- Education: Bayamón Central University
- Height: 1.79 m (5 ft 10 in)
- Weight: 53 kg (117 lb)

Sport
- Sport: Athletics
- Event: 400 m hurdles
Medal record
Representing Dominican Republic
Summer Universiade
Gold medal – first place	2015 Gwangju	4x400m relay
Gold medal – first place	2017 Taipei	400m hurdles
Gold medal – first place	2017 Taipei	4x400m relay

Juander Santos Aquino (born 7 May 1995 in Bayaguana) is a Dominican athlete specialising in the 400 metres and 400 metres hurdles. He has won several international medals, mainly in the relay.

He is the younger brother of 400m specialist and Olympic silver medalist, Luguelín Santos.

== Competition record ==
Year	Competition	Venue	Position	Event	Notes
Representing the Dominican Republic
2012	CAC Junior Championships (U18)	San Salvador, El Salvador	9th (h)	400 m	49.34
2012	CAC Junior Championships (U18)	San Salvador, El Salvador	2nd	4 × 100 m	41.57
2012	CAC Junior Championships (U18)	San Salvador, El Salvador	6th	4 × 400 m	3:17.78
2014	IAAF World Relays	Nassau, Bahamas	11th (B)	4 × 400 m	3:03.41
2014	World Junior Championships	Eugene, United States	45th (h)	200 m	21.62
2014	World Junior Championships	Eugene, United States	17th (sf)	400 m	47.64
2014	Ibero-American Championships	São Paulo, Brazil	6th	400 m	48.06
2014	Ibero-American Championships	São Paulo, Brazil	1st	4 × 400 m	3:02.73
2014	Pan American Sports Festival	Mexico City, Mexico	11th (h)	200 m	21.17
2014	Pan American Sports Festival	Mexico City, Mexico	11th (h)	400 m	47.41
2014	Central American and Caribbean Games	Xalapa, Mexico	4th	400 m	45.93
2014	Central American and Caribbean Games	Xalapa, Mexico	4th	4 × 400 m	3:02.86
2015	IAAF World Relays	Nassau, Bahamas	23rd (h)	4 × 400 m	3:12.55
2015	Universiade	Gwangju, South Korea	7th	400 m hurdles	50.34
2015	Universiade	Gwangju, South Korea	1st	4 × 400 m	3:05.05
2015	NACAC Championships	San José, Costa Rica	8th	400 m hurdles	50.79
2015	World Championships	Beijing, China	10th (h)	4 × 400 m	3:00.15
2016	Ibero-American Championships	Rio de Janeiro, Brazil	5th	400 m hurdles	49.73
2016	NACAC U23 Championships	San Salvador, El Salvador	3rd	400 m hurdles	50.02
2016	NACAC U23 Championships	San Salvador, El Salvador	4th	4 × 100 m	39.97
2017	World Championships	London, United Kingdom	6th	400 m hurdles	49.04
2017	Universiade	Taipei, Taiwan	1st	400 m hurdles	48.65
2017	Universiade	Taipei, Taiwan	1st	4 × 400 m	3:04.34
2018	World Indoor Championships	Birmingham, United Kingdom	11th (sf)	400 m	46.83
2018	World Indoor Championships	Birmingham, United Kingdom	8th (h)	4 × 400 m	3:10.45
2018	Central American and Caribbean Games	Barranquilla, Colombia	3rd	400 m hurdles	48.77
2018	Central American and Caribbean Games	Barranquilla, Colombia	2nd	4 × 400 m	3:03.92
2019	Pan American Games	Lima, Peru	8th	400 m hurdles	2:09.37
2019	Pan American Games	Lima, Peru	4th	4 × 400 m	3:05.64
2022	Ibero-American Championships	La Nucía, Spain	2nd	400 m hurdles	49.74
2022	Bolivarian Games	Valledupar, Colombia	1st	400 m hurdles	50.05
2022	Bolivarian Games	Valledupar, Colombia	3rd	4 × 400 m	3:08.11
2022	World Championships	Eugene, United States	35th (h)	400 m hurdles	58.80
2023	Central American and Caribbean Games	San Salvador, El Salvador	3rd	400 m hurdles	49.61
2023	Central American and Caribbean Games	San Salvador, El Salvador	3rd	4 × 400 m	3:02.19
2023	Pan American Games	Santiago, Chile	13th (h)	400 m hurdles	52.64
2024	Ibero-American Championships	Cuiabá, Brazil	5th	400 m hurdles	49.89
2024	Ibero-American Championships	Cuiabá, Brazil	–	4 × 400 m	DQ
2025	NACAC Championships	Freeport, Bahamas	9th (h)	400 m hurdles	51.20
2025	Bolivarian Games	Lima, Peru	5th	400 m hurdles	52.84
2026	Pan American Championships	Medellín, Colombia	7th	400 m hurdles	52.00
2026	Central American and Caribbean Games	Santo Domingo, Dominican Republic	11th (h)	400 m hurdles	53.23

== Personal bests ==
Outdoor

- 200 metres – 20.94 (-1.2 m/s) (Guatemala City 2014)
- 400 metres – 45.93 (Xalapa 2014)
- 400 metres hurdles – 48.59 (London 2017)
