= José Castillo (runner) =

Peruvian long-distance runner (born 1968)

Personal information
- Full name: Juan José Castillo Izarra
- Born: March 13, 1968 (age 58)

Sport
- Country: Peru
- Sport: Men's athletics

Achievements and titles
- Olympic finals: 1992 Summer Olympics
Medal record
South American Games
Bronze medal – third place	1990 Lima	10,000 m
Bolivarian Games
Gold medal – first place	1985 Cuenca	2000 m steeplechase
Gold medal – first place	1989 Maracaibo	5000 m
Gold medal – first place	1989 Maracaibo	3000 m steeplechase
Bronze medal – third place	1985 Cuenca	5000 m

Juan José Castillo Izarra (born March 13, 1968) is a retired male long-distance runner from Peru.

He is a one-time winner of the Buenos Aires Marathon (1997) in a time of 2:18:35 hours. He represented his native South American country in the men's 10,000 metres at the 1992 Summer Olympics in Barcelona, Spain.

== International competitions ==
Year	Competition	Venue	Position	Event	Notes
Representing Peru
1984	South American Youth Championships	Tarija, Bolivia	3rd	1500 m	4:20.0
1984	South American Youth Championships	Tarija, Bolivia	3rd	3000 m	9:19.9
1985	Bolivarian Games	Cuenca, Ecuador	3rd	5000 m	16:15.2 A
1985	Bolivarian Games	Cuenca, Ecuador	1st	2000 m steeplechase	6:08.99 A
1986	South American Junior Championships	Quito, Ecuador	5th	5000 m	16:48.31
1986	South American Junior Championships	Quito, Ecuador	1st	3000 m s'chase	6:12.0
1989	Bolivarian Games	Maracaibo, Venezuela	1st	5000 m	14:18.11
1989	Bolivarian Games	Maracaibo, Venezuela	1st	3000 m steeplechase	8:56.98
1989	South American Championships	Medellín, Colombia	4th	5000 m	14:11.94
1989	South American Championships	Medellín, Colombia	4th	3000 m s'chase	9:00.2
1990	Ibero-American Championships	Manaus, Brazil	4th	5000 m	14:03.54
1990	South American Games	Lima, Peru	3rd	10,000 m	30:10.4
1991	South American Championships	Manaus, Brazil	2nd	10,000 m	29:37.40
1993	South American Championships	Lima, Peru	3rd	5000 m	13:59.9
1993	South American Championships	Lima, Peru	2nd	10,000 m	28:56.80
