= Athletics at the 1985 Bolivarian Games =

Bolivarian Games

Athletics at the X Bolivarian Games
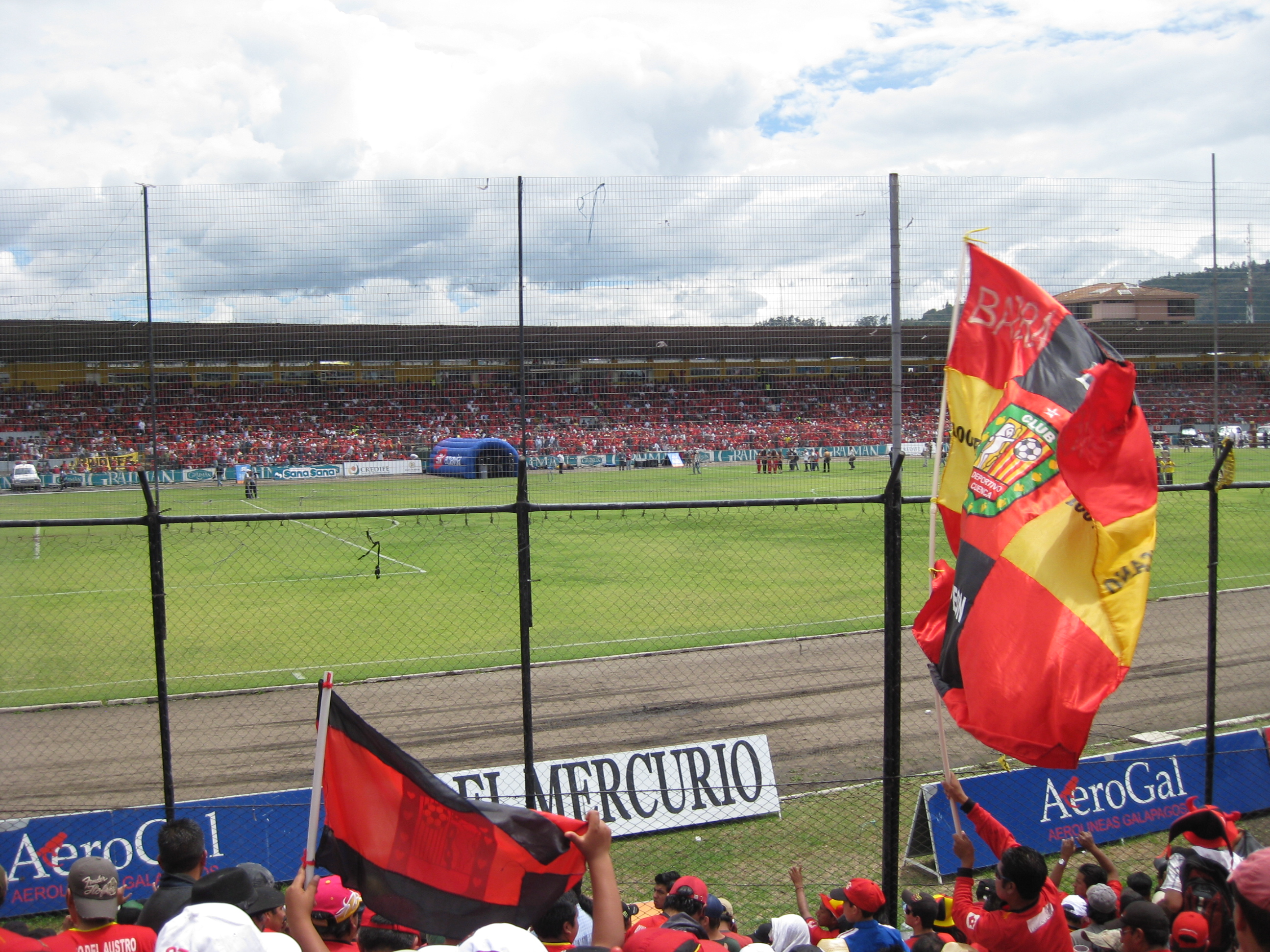
- Estadio Alejandro Serrano Aguilar (2011)
- Dates: November 9–18
- Host city: Cuenca, Ecuador
- Venue: Estadio Alejandro Serrano Aguilar
- Level: Senior
- Events: 37 (21 men, 16 women)

Athletics competitions at the 1985 Bolivarian Games were held at the Estadio Alejandro Serrano Aguilar in Cuenca, Ecuador, between November 9–18, 1985.

A detailed history of the early editions of the Bolivarian Games between 1938 and 1989 was published in a book written (in Spanish) by José Gamarra Zorrilla, former president of the Bolivian Olympic Committee, and first president (1976-1982) of ODESUR. Gold medal winners from Ecuador were published by the Comité Olímpico Ecuatoriano.

A total of 37 events were contested, 21 by men and 16 by women.

== Medal summary ==
Medal winners were published.

=== Men ===
Event	Gold		Silver		Bronze	
100 metres	Luis Smith (PAN)	10.99 A	Juan Villamizar (COL)	11.02 A	Juan Romero (VEN)	11.08 A
200 metres	Nelson Oquendo (VEN)	21.88 A	Iván Romero (VEN)	22.11 A	Luis Smith (PAN)	22.16 A
400 metres	Henry Aguiar (VEN)	48.99 A	Javier Bermúdez (COL)	49.77 A	Norman Popo (COL)	49.95 A
800 metres	José López (VEN)	1:55.4 A	Félix Inado (PER)	1:57.0 A	Héctor Saavedra (COL)	1:57.2 A
1500 metres	José López (VEN)	4:06.5 A	José Manjarret (VEN)	4:07.6 A	Herder Vásquez (COL)	4:08.1 A
5000 metres	Herder Vásquez (COL)	16:08.5 A	Ricaurte Oviedo (COL)	16:10.7 A	Juan José Castillo (PER)	16:15.2 A
2000 metres steeplechase	Juan José Castillo (PER)	6:08.99 A	Félix Inado (PER)	6:09.94 A	Oscar Díaz (COL)	6:15.19 A
110 metres hurdles	Miguel Saldarriaga (COL)	15.0 A	José Duque (VEN)	15.2 A	Roberto Sensi (PAN)	15.5 A
400 metres hurdles	Luis Bello (VEN)	54.81 A	Gonzalo González (VEN)	55.58 A	Alberto Izu (PER)	55.88 A
4 × 100 metres relay	Venezuela; Ángel Tovar; Nelson Oquendo; Iván Romero; Juan Romero	41.48 A	Colombia; Juan Villamizar; Norman Popo; José López; Vélez	42.73 A	Peru; César Cahua; Pinto; Claudio Galdos; Orbe	42.79 A
4 × 400 metres relay	Colombia ? ? Norman Popo; Javier Bermúdez	3:18.9 A	Venezuela ? ? Luis Bello; Henry Aguiar	3:20.9 A	Ecuador; Edwin Sacotto; Alex Almeida; Santiago Ruiz; Jefferson Quiñónez	3:24.4 A
10,000 metres race walk	Álvaro López (COL)	46:24.1 A	José Moreno (COL)	46:24.4 A	Juan Rojas (ECU)	47:40.6 A
High jump	Santiago Lozada (PER)	2.10 A	Adolfredo Jiménez (VEN)	1.96 A	Valery Abugattás (PER)	1.96 A
Pole vault	Miguel Saldarriaga (COL)	4.50 A	Dean Torres (ECU)	4.40 A	Javier Parra (COL)	4.20 A
Long jump	Ángel Tovar (VEN)	7.40 A	Javier Castañeda (COL)	7.16 A	Nelson Covis (VEN)	7.04 A
Triple jump	Sergio Saavedra (VEN)	15.27 A	Miguel Padrón (VEN)	15.17 A	Ricardo Valiente (PER)	15.16 A
Shot put	Alberto Farías (VEN)	15.29 A	Alberto Auad (ECU)	14.59 A	Efrén Sánchez (VEN)	14.51 A
Discus throw	Oswaldo Benamu (VEN)	40.96 A	William Márquez (VEN)	39.64 A	Guido Rossi (PER)	37.20 A
Hammer throw	Carlos Gamboa (VEN)	54.06 A	José Rivas (VEN)	52.80 A	Roberto Lozano (COL)	52.48 A
Javelin throw	Luis Carrasco (VEN)	61.28 A	Roberto Espinoso (VEN)	60.82 A	Pedro Cortez (COL)	56.42 A
Decathlon	Dionisio Lugo (VEN)	6002 A	Víctor Rojas (VEN)	5838 A	Dean Torres (ECU)	5518 A

=== Women ===
Event	Gold		Silver		Bronze	
100 metres	Elia Mera (COL)	12.45 A	Susana Mentor (VEN)	12.55 A	Zuleika Beard (PAN)	12.56 A
200 metres	Ximena Restrepo (COL)	24.93 A	Zuleika Beard (PAN)	25.66 A	Audrey González (VEN)	25.87 A
400 metres	Valeria López (ECU)	58.16 A	Esthela Kelly (PAN)	58.67 A	Elke Borodt (BOL)	59.38 A
800 metres	Milexa Figueroa (VEN)	2:18.71 A	Elvia Lopera (COL)	2:20.22 A	Mihusa Mancilla (BOL)	2:22.91 A
1500 metres	Martha Palomino (PER)	5:00.38 A	Wilma Guerra (ECU)	5:02.09 A	Elvia Aucancela (ECU)	5:05.01 A
3000 metres	Martha Palomino (PER)	11:03.90 A	Wilma Guerra (ECU)	11:08.90 A	Esperanza Sierra (COL)	11:15.69 A
100 metres hurdles	Mirtha Blanco (VEN)	15.25 A	Susana Letts (PER)	15.34 A	Xiomara Hernández (VEN)	16.38 A
200 metres hurdles	Adriana Martínez (ECU)	30.03 A	Magaly Flores (VEN)	30.14 A	Xiomara Hernández (VEN)	30.47 A
4 × 100 metres relay	Colombia; Elia Mera; Ximena Restrepo; Maribelcy Peña; Aguino	47.89 A	Venezuela; Carmen Álvarez; Susana Mentor; Audrey González; Marbelis Barriga	48.59 A	Peru; Debora de Souza; Daisy Zereceda; Braganini; Cordano	49.69 A
4 × 400 metres relay	Colombia; Elia Mera; Ximena Restrepo lvira Lopera; Araguen	3:58.22 A	Venezuela; Carmen Rodríguez; Milexa Figueroa; Wilma Jordan; Solarte	4:02.26 A	Ecuador; Chinga; Elvira León; Adriana Martínez; Valeria López	4:02.88 A
High jump	Fernanda Mosquera (COL)	1.71 A	Ilon Bohman (ECU)	1.61 A	Mary Brito (VEN)	1.61 A
Long jump	Deborah de Souza (PER)	5.49 A	Carmen Rodríguez (VEN)	5.41 A	Audrey González (VEN)	5.39 A
Shot put	Jenny Quintero (VEN)	12.73 A	Lila Morales (VEN)	11.32 A	Samara Buenaños (COL)	11.14 A
Discus throw	Jenny Quintero (VEN)	44.92 A	Magaly Centeno (VEN)	44.34 A	Elvira Yufra (PER)	41.34 A
Javelin throw	Dorelis Quiñónez (VEN)	41.40 A	Deisy Córdova (VEN)	40.06 A	Janeth Vazques (COL)	37.22 A
Heptathlon	Mary Brito (VEN)	3942 A	Maureen Reyes (VEN)	3621 A	Malú Crousillat (PER)	3275 A

== Medal table (unofficial) ==
* Host nation (Ecuador)

Rank	Nation	Gold	Silver	Bronze	Total
1	Venezuela (VEN)	19	20	8	47
2	Colombia (COL)	10	7	10	27
3	Peru (PER)	5	3	9	17
4	Ecuador (ECU)*	2	5	5	12
5	Panama (PAN)	1	2	3	6
6	Bolivia (BOL)	0	0	2	2
Totals (6 entries)		37	37	37	111
