= Anahí Suárez =

Ecuadorian sprinter (born 2001)

Personal information
- Born: Gabriela Anahí Suárez Suárez; 2 February 2001 (age 25) Ibarra, Ecuador

Sport
- Sport: Athletics
- Event: 100 metres
Medal record
Women's athletics
Representing Ecuador
South American U23 Championships
Gold medal – first place	2022 Cascavel	100m
Gold medal – first place	2022 Cascavel	200m
Gold medal – first place	2022 Cascavel	4x100m relay
Youth Olympic Games
Bronze medal – third place	2018 Buenos Aires	100 m
South American U18 Championships
Gold medal – first place	2018 Cuenca	100 m
Gold medal – first place	2018 Cuenca	200 m

Gabriela Anahí Suárez Suárez (born 2 February 2001) is a sprinter from Ecuador. She has represented her country at multiple major championships, and was national record holder in the 200 metres between 2022 and 2026.

== Biography ==
In 2018, she won double gold in the 100 metres and 200 metres at the South American U18 Championships in Athletics. She won bronze in the 100 metres at the 2018 Summer Youth Olympics.

On 12 December 2020 in Quito she ran 100 metres in 11.16 seconds which placed her 12th on the year list worldwide for 2020.

In July 2021, Suarez was named to the Ecuador Olympic squad for the 4x100 relay. She set a new Ecuadorian national record in the 200 meters at the 2022 World Athletics Championships in Eugene, Oregon, running 22.74 seconds, time that was not surpassed until 2026 by Nicole Caicedo. In October she won the gold medal in the 200 metres at the 2022 South American Games in Asuncion, Paraguay. Suarez competed for Ecuador at the 2023 Pan American Games.

She ran as part of the Ecuadorean 4 × 100 m relay team at the 2024 World Relays Championships in Nassau, Bahamas. She won silver in the 200 metres at the Ibero-American Championships in Athletics in Cuiabá, Brazil, in May 2024. She competed at the 2024 Summer Olympics in Paris over 200 metres.

In September 2025, she competed in the 200 metres at the 2025 World Championships in Tokyo, Japan, without advancing to the semi-finals.
