= 2017 IAAF World U18 Championships – Boys' 100 metres =

Boys' 100 metres at the 2017 IAAF World U18 Championships
- Venue: Moi International Sports Centre
- Dates: 12 July
- Competitors: 37 from 28 nations
- Winning time: 10.57

Medalists
gold medal	Tshenolo Lemao	South Africa
silver medal	Retshidisitswe Mlenga	South Africa
bronze medal	Tyreke Wilson	Jamaica

The boys' 100 metres at the 2017 IAAF World U18 Championships was held on 12 July.

== Records ==
Prior to the competition, the following records were as follows.

World Youth Best	Anthony Schwartz (USA)	10.15	Gainesville, Florida, United States	31 March 2017
Championship Record	Abdul Hakim Sani Brown (JPN)	10.28	Cali, Colombia	15 July 2015
World Youth Leading	Anthony Schwartz (USA)	10.15	Gainesville, Florida, United States	31 March 2017

== Heats ==
Qualification rule: first 4 of each heat (Q) and the next 4 fastest qualified.

Rank	Heat	Lane	Name	Nationality	Time	Notes
1	1	5	Retshidisitswe Mlenga	South Africa	10.48	Q
2	3	5	Tshenolo Lemao	South Africa	10.54	Q
3	2	2	Luis Brandner	Germany	10.54	Q, PB
4	2	7	Vasyl Makukh	Ukraine	10.59	Q, PB
5	4	5	Mohamed Zekraoui	Algeria	10.59	Q, PB
6	5	7	Tyreke Wilson	Jamaica	10.60	Q
7	4	8	Adrian Curry	Bahamas	10.61	Q
8	4	3	Abdu Marzouq	Saudi Arabia	10.68	Q, PB
9	3	6	Nick Kocevar	Germany	10.68	Q, PB
10	1	3	Arielton dos Santos	Brazil	10.73	Q
11	4	6	Tobias Larsen	Denmark	10.73	Q, PB
12	5	2	Danelson Mahautiere	Dominica	10.74	Q, PB
13	1	7	Joel Johnson	Bahamas	10.77	Q
14	5	3	Elijah Matayo	Kenya	10.78	Q, PB
15	3	4	Oleksandr Savenko	Ukraine	10.79	Q
16	3	7	Huang Yonglian	China	10.79	Q
17	2	3	Mojela Koneshe	Lesotho	10.80	Q, PB
18	1	4	Suo Hanbo	China	10.85	Q
19	2	1	Muhammad Sa'adon	Malaysia	10.89	Q
20	4	7	Rodrigo Guzmán	Mexico	10.89	q
21	4	4	Tse Yee Hin Rico	Hong Kong	10.89	q
22	2	4	Mehdi Nait Abdelaziz	Algeria	10.92	q
23	5	6	Joshua Han Wei Chua	Singapore	10.94	Q
24	1	8	Theron Human	Namibia	11.03	q
25	5	8	Gurindervir Singh	India	11.07	
26	2	5	Fabrizio Aquino	Paraguay	11.09	
27	3	2	Ch. Palendra Kumar	India	11.10	
28	1	2	Tajarie Arthurton	Saint Kitts and Nevis	11.12	
29	5	5	Erik Cardoso	Brazil	11.20	
30	2	6	Jean Ngoma Toko Wasala	Republic of the Congo	11.27	PB
31	5	4	Francesco Sansovini	San Marino	11.38	
32	4	2	Issiaka Djire	Mali	11.41	PB
33	3	8	Mohamed Dahalane	Comoros	11.49	PB
34	3	3	Yusufjon Bekmurodov	Tajikistan	11.61	PB
35	1	6	Daniel Tajar	South Sudan	11.82	PB
	2	8	Enoch Adegoke	Nigeria	DNS	
	3	1	Gershon Omubo	Nigeria	DNS	

== Semifinals ==
Qualification rule: first 2 of each heat (Q) and the next 2 fastest qualified.

Rank	Heat	Name	Nationality	Time	Notes
1	2	Retshidisitswe Mlenga	South Africa	10.37	Q, PB
2	3	Tyreke Wilson	Jamaica	10.47	Q
3	3	Tshenolo Lemao	South Africa	10.50	Q
4	1	Arielton dos Santos	Brazil	10.56	Q, PB
5	3	Nick Kocevar	Germany	10.57	Q, PB
6	2	Adrian Curry	Bahamas	10.59	Q
7	3	Abdu Marzouq	Saudi Arabia	10.61	q, PB
8	3	Huang Yonglian	China	10.62	PB
9	1	Luis Brandner	Germany	10.62	Q
10	2	Suo Hanbo	China	10.65	PB
11	1	Mohamed Zekraoui	Algeria	10.67	
12	2	Danelson Mahautiere	Dominica	10.67	PB
13	1	Joel Johnson	Bahamas	10.68	PB
14	1	Tobias Larsen	Denmark	10.74	
15	3	Elijah Matayo	Kenya	10.74	PB
16	1	Tse Yee Hin Rico	Hong Kong	10.77	
17	2	Muhammad Sa'adon	Malaysia	10.80	PB
18	1	Oleksandr Savenko	Ukraine	10.82	
19	2	Theron Human	Namibia	10.84	
20	1	Rodrigo Guzmán	Mexico	10.86	
21	3	Mehdi Nait Abdelaziz	Algeria	10.97	
22	3	Joshua Han Wei Chua	Singapore	11.05	
23	2	Vasyl Makukh	Ukraine	11.41	
	2	Mojela Koneshe	Lesotho	DQ	

== Final ==
Rank	Name	Nationality	Reaction	Time	Notes
1st place, gold medalist(s)	Tshenolo Lemao	South Africa	0.186	10.57	
2nd place, silver medalist(s)	Retshidisitswe Mlenga	South Africa	0.195	10.61	
3rd place, bronze medalist(s)	Tyreke Wilson	Jamaica	0.213	10.65	
4	Arielton dos Santos	Brazil	0.205	10.73	
5	Nick Kocevar	Germany	0.233	10.83	
6	Adrian Curry	Bahamas	0.288	10.86	
7	Abdu Marzouq	Saudi Arabia	0.211	11.01	
8	Luis Brandner	Germany	0.244	11.13	
