= 2017 World Youth Championships in Athletics – Girls' 100 metres =

The Girls' 100 metres at the 2017 World Youth Championships in Athletics was held on 12–13 July.

== Medalists ==
Gold	Silver	Bronze
Mizgin Ay; Turkey	Magdalena Stefanowicz; Poland	Kevona Davis; Jamaica

== Records ==
Prior to the competition, the following records were as follows.

World Youth Best	Candace Hill (USA)	10.98	Shoreline, WA, United States	20 June 2015
Championship Record	Candace Hill (USA)	11.08	Cali, Colombia	16 July 2015
World Youth Leading	Kevona Davis (JAM)	11.24	Kingston, Jamaica	23 June 2017

== Results ==
Qualification rule: first 3 of each heat (Q) and the next 4 fastest qualified.

Women's 100m Round 1
Place	Athlete	Country	Time	Heat
1	Lorraine Martins	Brazil	11.85	2
2	Kevona Davis	Jamaica	11.88	4
3	Mizgin Ay	Turkey	11.92	3
4	Magdalena Stefanowicz	Poland	12.01	3
5	Luying Gong	China	12.03	4
6	Tami Ščančar	Slovenia	12.10	2
7	Sade Amor de Sousa	Namibia	12.12	4
8	Guillermina Cossio	Argentina	12.15	2
9	Rose Xeyi	South Africa	12.18	1
10	Iza Obal	Slovenia	12.19	3
11	Martha Méndez	Dominican Republic	12.20	3
12	Beauty Somuah	Germany	12.22	1
13	Gal Kadmon	Israel	12.25	1
14	Joviale Mbisha	South Africa	12.27	3
15	Jelena Pechtirewa	Azerbaijan	12.28	1
16	Suwilanji Mpondela	Zambia	12.28	1
17	Gayane Chiloyan	Armenia	12.29	2
18	Scarlet Reyes	Dominican Republic	12.33	4
19	Katherine Chillambo	Ecuador	12.38	2
20	Melike Malkoc	Turkey	12.42	1
21	Chan Pui Kei	Hong Kong	12.44	2
22	Beatrice Anyango Odero	Kenya	12.50	2
23	Marie Anne-Loa Leopold	Mauritius	12.54	4
24	Jana Mitovska	Macedonia	12.67	4
25	Akouvi Judith Koumedzina	Togo	12.71	4
26	Jeany Nuraini Amelia Agreta	Indonesia	13.01	3
27	Faith Morris	Belize	13.13	3
28	Jordanie Ngrekoudou	Central African Republic	13.60	1
29	Erica Mouwangui	Equatorial Guinea	13.92	1
	Agate de Sousa	São Tomé and Príncipe	DNS	2
	Nancy Saah	Liberia	DNS	3
	Rosemary Chukwuma	Nigeria	DNS	4

Women's 100m Semifinal
Place	Athlete	Country	Time	Heat
1	Kevona Davis	Jamaica	11.45	2
2	Mizgin Ay	Turkey	11.57	2
3	Lorraine Martins	Brazil	11.69	1
4	Magdalena Stefanowicz	Poland	11.69	1
5	Rose Xeyi	South Africa	11.83	1
6	Martha Méndez	Dominican Republic	11.85	1
7	Iza Obal	Slovenia	11.92	1
8	Tami Ščančar	Slovenia	11.93	2
9	Jelena Pechtirewa	Azerbaijan	11.93	2
10	Joviale Mbisha	South Africa	11.99	2
11	Sade Amor de Sousa	Namibia	12.03	1
12	Beauty Somuah	Germany	12.07	1
13	Guillermina Cossio	Argentina	12.13	2
14	Gal Kadmon	Israel	12.17	2
15	Suwilanji Mpondela	Zambia	12.33	1
	Luying Gong	China	DNS	2

Women's 100m (+0.5 m/s)
Place	Athlete	Country	Time
1st place, gold medalist(s)	Mizgin Ay	Turkey	11.62
2nd place, silver medalist(s)	Magdalena Stefanowicz	Poland	11.62
3rd place, bronze medalist(s)	Kevona Davis	Jamaica	11.67
4	Lorraine Martins	Brazil	11.80
5	Tami Ščančar	Slovenia	11.91
6	Iza Obal	Slovenia	12.00
7	Rose Xeyi	South Africa	12.01
8	Martha Méndez	Dominican Republic	12.06
