= Athletics at the 2026 Commonwealth Games – Women's 400 metres hurdles =

Women's 400 metres hurdles at the 2026 Commonwealth Games
- Venue: Scotstoun Stadium, Glasgow
- Dates: 29 July 2026 (round 1); 31 July 2026 (final)
- Competitors: 10 from 7 nations
- Winning time: 54.00

Medalists
gold medal	Sanique Walker	Jamaica
silver medal	Emily Newnham	England
bronze medal	Savannah Sutherland	Canada

The women's 400 metres hurdles at the 2026 Commonwealth Games, as part of the athletics programme, will take place at the Scotstoun Stadium from 29 to 31 July 2026.

== Records ==
Prior to this competition, the existing world, Commonwealth and Commonwealth Games records were as follows:

Women's 400 Metres Hurdles
World record	50.37	Sydney McLaughlin-Levrone (USA)	8 Aug 2024	Stade de France, Paris
Commonwealth record	52.42	Melaine Walker (JAM)	20 Aug 2009	Berlin, Germany
Games record	53.82	Jana Pittman (AUS)	23 Mar 2006	Melbourne, Australia

== Schedule ==
The schedule was as follows:

Date	Time	Round
29 July 2026	10:00	Round 1
31 July 2026	18:30	Final

All times are United Kingdom time (UTC+1)

== Results ==
=== Round 1 ===
Round 1 was held on the morning of 29 July 2026.. First 3 in each heat (Q) and the next 2 fastest (q) advance to the Final.

==== Heat 1 ====
Place	Lane	Athlete	Nation	Time	Notes
1	6	Shiann Salmon	Jamaica	55.30	Q
2	3	Emily Newnham	England	56.08	Q
3	5	Vanice Kerubo Nyagisera	Kenya	56.43	Q
4	7	Brooke Overholt	Canada	56.83	q
5	4	Lovina Ewusi	Ghana	57.54	

==== Heat 2 ====
Place	Lane	Athlete	Nation	Time	Notes
1	4	Sanique Walker	Jamaica	54.83	Q
2	3	Lina Nielsen	England	55.66	Q
3	5	Savannah Sutherland	Canada	55.73	Q
4	6	Sarah Carli	Australia	55.76	q
	7	Linda Angounou	Cameroon	DQ	TR 16.8

=== Final ===
The final took place in the evening of 31 July 2026.

Place	Lane	Athlete	Nation	Time	Notes
1st place, gold medalist(s)	6	Sanique Walker	Jamaica	54.00	PB
2nd place, silver medalist(s)	5	Emily Newnham	England	54.04	
3rd place, bronze medalist(s)	8	Savannah Sutherland	Canada	54.16	SB
4	7	Lina Nielsen	England	54.69	=SB
5	4	Shiann Salmon	Jamaica	55.54	
6	1	Sarah Carli	Australia	55.85	
7	2	Brooke Overholt	Canada	56.10	
8	3	Vanice Kerubo Nyagisera	Kenya	56.67	
