= 2025 European Athletics U23 Championships – Women's 400 metres hurdles =

Women's 400 metres hurdles at the 2025 European Athletics U23 Championships
- Venue: Fana Stadion
- Location: Bergen, Norway
- Dates: 17 July (heats); 18 July (semi-finals); 19 July (final)
- Competitors: 38 from 21 nations
- Winning time: 54.08 CR, PB

Medalists
gold medal	Emily Newnham	Great Britain
silver medal	Vanessa Baldé	Germany
bronze medal	Vivienne Morgenstern	Germany

The women's 400 metres hurdles event at the 2025 European Athletics U23 Championships was held in Bergen, Norway, at Fana Stadion on 17, 18 and 19 July.

== Records ==
Prior to the competition, the records were as follows:

Record	Athlete (nation)	Time (s)	Location	Date
European U23 record	Femke Bol (NED)	52.03	Tokyo, Japan	4 August 2021
Championship U23 record	Emma Zapletalová (SVK)	54.28	Tallinn, Estonia	10 July 2021

== Results ==
=== Heats ===
First 4 in each heat (Q) and the next 4 fastest (q) qualified for the semi-finals.

==== Heat 1 ====
Place	Athlete	Nation	Time	Notes
1	Ester Bendová	Czech Republic	57.41	Q
2	Vanessa Baldé	Germany	57.53	Q
3	Wiktoria Oko	Poland	57.57	Q
4	Heidi Salminen	Finland	57.88	Q
5	Rebecca Slezáková	Slovakia	57.93	q, SB
6	Lilla Bartha	Hungary	58.13	q
7	Mia Lisett Meringo	Estonia	59.27	
8	Vasiliki-Paraskevi Mitsiouli	Greece	59.35	

==== Heat 2 ====
Place	Athlete	Nation	Time	Notes
1	Emily Newnham	Great Britain	56.14	Q
2	Paulina Kubis	Poland	57.53	Q
3	Ludovica Cavo	Italy	57.74	Q
4	Laura Aguilera	Spain	58.14	Q
5	Vanessa Mercera	Netherlands	58.15	
6	Uršula Černelč	Slovenia	59.61	
7	Hanna Karlsson	Sweden	1:00.41	

==== Heat 3 ====
Place	Athlete	Nation	Time	Notes
1	Barbora Vaňková	Czech Republic	56.45	Q, PB
2	Moa Granat	Sweden	56.64	Q
3	Yasmin Amaadacho	Germany	56.78	Q
4	Selma Ims	Norway	57.78	Q
5	Anja Dlauhy	Austria	58.54	
6	Giulia Ingenito	Italy	59.56	
7	Eva Mačković	Croatia	59.74	

==== Heat 4 ====
Place	Athlete	Nation	Time	Notes
1	Aada Aho	Finland	57.26	Q
2	Sofia Lavreshina	Portugal	57.58	Q
3	Alessia Seramondi	Italy	57.62	Q
4	Regina Mohai	Hungary	57.69	Q
5	Elimpiona Zenegia	Greece	58.08	q, PB
6	Tilde Bjerager	Sweden	58.48	
7	Miranda Lauvstad	Norway	1:00.21	
8	Mia Pirnat Kopač	Slovenia	1:00.34	

==== Heat 5 ====
Place	Athlete	Nation	Time	Notes
1	Magdalena Šlapáková	Czech Republic	57.03	Q
2	Vivienne Morgenstern	Germany	57.54	Q
3	Laoura Zenegia	Greece	57.71	Q, SB
4	Gülşah Cebeci̇	Turkey	58.06	Q, PB
5	Candice von Plauen	France	58.07	q
6	Aleksandra Wołczak	Poland	58.25	
7	Maša Garić	Bosnia and Herzegovina	1:01.29	
8	Neža Dolenc	Slovenia	1:01.41	

=== Semi-finals ===
First 2 in each heat (Q) and the next 2 fastest (q) qualified for the semi-finals.

==== Heat 1 ====
Place	Athlete	Nation	Time	Notes
1	Emily Newnham	United Kingdom	55.13	Q
2	Vanessa Baldé	Germany	55.96	Q, PB
3	Ester Bendová	Czech Republic	56.30	PB
4	Alessia Seramondi	Italy	56.36	PB
5	Wiktoria Oko	Poland	56.76	PB
6	Heidi Salminen	Finland	57.66	
7	Elimpiona Zenegia	Greece	58.34	
8	Gülşah Cebeci̇	Turkey	1:00.51	

==== Heat 2 ====
Place	Athlete	Nation	Time	Notes
1	Aada Aho	Finland	56.00	Q, PB
2	Vivienne Morgenstern	Germany	56.22	Q
3	Magdalena Šlapáková	Czech Republic	56.66	PB
4	Ludovica Cavo	Italy	57.06	PB
5	Sofia Lavreshina	Portugal	57.73	
6	Candice von Plauen	France	57.97	
7	Rebecca Slezáková	Slovakia	58.75	
8	Regina Mohai	Hungary	59.11	

==== Heat 3 ====
Place	Athlete	Nation	Time	Notes
1	Moa Granat	Sweden	55.67	Q
2	Barbora Vaňková	Czech Republic	55.79	Q, PB
3	Paulina Kubis	Poland	55.88	q, PB
4	Yasmin Amaadacho	Germany	56.27	q, PB
5	Laoura Zenegia	Greece	56.69	NU23R
6	Selma Ims	Norway	57.30	
7	Laura Aguilera	Spain	58.00	
8	Lilla Bartha	Hungary	58.89	

=== Final ===
Place	Athlete	Nation	Time	Notes
1st place, gold medalist(s)	Emily Newnham	United Kingdom	54.08	CR, PB
2nd place, silver medalist(s)	Vanessa Baldé	Germany	55.36	PB
3rd place, bronze medalist(s)	Vivienne Morgenstern	Germany	55.45	PB
4	Moa Granat	Sweden	55.56	
5	Paulina Kubis	Poland	55.89	
6	Aada Aho	Finland	56.13	
7	Yasmin Amaadacho	Germany	56.22	PB
8	Barbora Vaňková	Czech Republic	56.34	
