= 2017 World Youth Championships in Athletics – Boys' pole vault =

Boy's pole vault at the World U18 Championships
- Venue: Moi International Sports Centre
- Dates: 16 July 2017

Medalists
gold medal	Matthias Orban	France
silver medal	Christos Tamanis	Cyprus
bronze medal	Illya Kravchenko	Ukraine

The Boys' pole vault at the 2017 World Youth Championships in Athletics was held on 16 July at the Moi International Sports Centre, Nairobi, Kenya.

== Results ==
Legend

- – — Pass
- O — Clearance
- X — Failure
- NM — No mark
- DNF — Did not finish

Rank	Athlete	Attempts							Result
Rank	Athlete	4.55	4.70	4.85	5.00	5.10	5.20	5.25	Result
1st place, gold medalist(s)	(France) Matthias Orban	O	XO	O	XXO	XXX			5.00
2nd place, silver medalist(s)	(Cyprus) Christos Tamanis	XO	O	XXO	XXX				4.85
3rd place, bronze medalist(s)	(Ukraine) Illya Kravchenko	O	O	XXX					4.70
4	(Germany) Daniel Breinl	O	XXO	XXX					4.70
5	(South Africa) Valko van Wyk	O	XXX						4.55
6	(Israel) Maksim Goldovskiy	XO	XXX						4.55
7	(France) Wilfrid Bambock	XXX							NM
8	(Czech Republic) Filip Bartonek	XXX							NM
9	(China) Yang Lucheng	XXX							NM
10	(Argentina) Pablo Zaffaroni	XXX							NM
