= Britany Anderson =

Jamaican hurdler (born 2001)

Personal information
- Nationality: Jamaican
- Born: 3 January 2001 (age 25)

Sport
- Country: Jamaica
- Sport: Athletics
- Events: Hurdling, sprint
- Coached by: Marco Airale

Achievements and titles
- Personal bests: 60 m hurdles: 7.82 (Louisville, 2022); 100 m hurdles: 12.31 (Eugene, 2022)
Medal record
Women's athletics
Representing Jamaica
World Championships
Silver medal – second place	2022 Eugene	100 m hurdles
Wanda Diamond League
Third place	2022 Zurich	100 mh
World U20 Championships
Silver medal – second place	2018 Tampere	100 m hurdles
World U18 Championships
Gold medal – first place	2017 Nairobi	100 m hurdles
Carifta Games Youth (U18)
Gold medal – first place	2017 Willemstad	100 m hurdles
Gold medal – first place	2016 St. George's	Long jump
Silver medal – second place	2016 St. George's	200 m

Britany Anderson (born 3 January 2001) is a Jamaican hurdler. She was the silver medalist in the 100 metres hurdles at the 2022 World Athletics Championships and gold medalist at the 2017 IAAF World U18 Championships.

== Career ==
Anderson won the gold medal in the 100 metres hurdles at the 2017 IAAF World U18 Championships in Nairobi, Kenya. The following year, Anderson won the silver medal at the 2018 World Athletics U20 Championships in Tampere, Finland, credited with the same time (13.01 seconds) as gold medal winner Tia Jones of the United States.

Anderson twice broke the world U20 record at the same meeting, held previously by Cuba's Aliuska López in 1987, whilst competing on 24 July 2019, at the Motonet Grand Prix in Joensuu. First running 12.79 seconds in her heat, before bettering it later that day to 12.71 seconds. The record was ratified on 11 September 2019. She was one of five finalists for the 2019 IAAF Female Rising Star Award.

She qualified to represent Jamaica at the delayed 2020 Summer Olympics, held in Tokyo in August 2021. In the semi-finals of the 100 m hurdles at the Olympic Games, she set a new personal best of 12.40 seconds, defeating eventual silver medalist Kendra Harrison in her race. In the final, she hit a hurdle and finished in 8th place.

Anderson finished fourth in 7.96 seconds in the 60 metres hurdles at the 2022 World Athletics Indoor Championships in Belgrade. That summer, at the 2022 World Athletics Championships in Eugene, Oregon Anderson won the silver medal in the final of the 100 metres hurdles in a Jamaican record time of 12.31 seconds, a record that stood until broken by Ackera Nugent in 2024. At 21, Anderson set a new record as the youngest 100m hurdles medalist in a World Championships or Olympic Games.

Knee surgery caused Anderson to miss the entire 2023 season. On her comeback she ran 13.34 seconds to win at the La Fratellanza 1874 meeting on 26 April 2024, in Italy. She went on to compete throughout the season including at the 2024 Jamaican Championships.

== Personal life ==
In the summer of 2025, Anderson announced her marriage to Gianluca Marchiori and subsequent pregnancy via her social media platform. She has one son.
