= Sanique Walker =

Jamaican hurdler (born 2000)

Personal information
- Nationality: Jamaican
- Born: 8 April 2000 (age 26)

Sport
- Sport: Athletics
- Event: 400 metres hurdles
- College team: Texas Longhorns
- Club: Felix Sanchez Track Club
- Coached by: Felix Sanchez (Hurdler)

Achievements and titles
- Personal bests: 400mH: 53.61 (Budapest, 2026)
Medal record
Women's athletics
Representing Jamaica
Commonwealth Games
Gold medal – first place	2026 Glasgow	400m hurdles
NACAC Championships
Silver medal – second place	2025 Freeport	400m hurdles
World Youth Championships
Silver medal – second place	2017 Nairobi	400 m hurdles
CARIFTA Games (U20)
Gold medal – first place	2017 Willemstad	400m hurdles
Gold medal – first place	2017 Willemstad	4 × 400 m relay
Silver medal – second place	2018 Nassau	400m hurdles
Silver medal – second place	2016 St. George's	400m hurdles

Sanique Walker (born 8 April 2000) is a Jamaican track and field athlete. She won the 2026 Commonwealth Games and the Jamaican Athletics Championships in 2026 over 400 metres hurdles.

== Early life ==
She was educated at Vere Technical High School in Jamaica before later attending college in the United States at the University of Texas at Austin on a scholarship.

== Career ==
She finished third over 400 metres hurdles at the 2017 Jamaican Boys and Girls' Championships. She finished runner-up over 400 metre hurdles to South African Zeney van der Walt at the 2017 IAAF World U18 Championships in Nairobi, Kenya running 58.27 seconds. That year, she topped the U18 World Rankings with a best time of 57.27 seconds.

The following year, she lowered her personal best to 57.19 seconds and competed at the 2018 IAAF World U20 Championships in Tampere, Finland where she qualified for the semi-finals but had to withdraw with a hamstring injury.

== 2025 ==
She finished fourth in the 400 metre hurdles at the 2025 Jamaican Athletics Championships in Kingston, running 55.38 seconds. She was a silver medalist at the 2025 NACAC Championships in Freeport, The Bahamas running a personal best in the 400 metres hurdles of 54.94 seconds. She was named as a reserve for the 2025 World Championships but was unable to replace the injured Rushell Clayton because of what the JAAA described as "logistical challenges" but Walker attributed in the Jamaica Observer to the fact that she was not given the opportunity to take the mandatory SRY gene test required for all competing female athletes.

== 2026 ==
On 21 June 2026, Walker won her first senior national title at the 2026 Jamaican Athletics Championships, running a new personal best of 54.56 seconds. Competing for Jamaica at the 2026 Commonwealth Games in Glasgow, Scotland, Walker ran a new personal best 54.00 seconds to win the gold medal in the 400 metres hurdles ahead of Emily Newnham of England and Canadian Savannah Sutherland. In September, she competed in the 400 m hurdles at the inaugural World Ultimate Championship in Budapest, qualifying for the final and placing fifth overall with a new personal best of 53.61 seconds.
