= 2018 CARIFTA Games =

XLVII CARIFTA Games
- Dates: 31 March – 2 April
- Host city: Nassau, Bahamas (The Bahamas)
- Venue: Thomas Robinson Stadium
- Level: Junior and Youth
- Events: Junior: 35 (incl. 4 open), Youth: 31

The 2018 CARIFTA Games took place between 31 March and 2 April 2018. The event was held at the Thomas Robinson Stadium in Nassau, Bahamas.

== Medal summary ==
=== Boys U-20 (Junior) ===
Event	Gold		Silver		Bronze	
100 metres (+1.1 m/s)	Joel Johnson; Bahamas	10.31	Adrian Curry; Bahamas	10.43	Rikkoi Brathwaite; British Virgin Islands	10.46
200 metres (+1.1 m/s)	Christopher Taylor; Jamaica	20.38	Joel Johnson; Bahamas	20.90	Xavier Nairne; Jamaica	21.07
400 metres	Dashawn Morris; Jamaica	46.58	Jonathan Jones; Barbados	46.97	Ramsey Angela; Curaçao	47.01
800 metres	Jonathan Jones; Barbados	1:49.58	Ken Reyes; Turks and Caicos Islands	1:50.46	Kimar Farquharson; Jamaica	1:50.95
1500 metres	Javon-Taye Williams; Jamaica	4:02.02	Evan Jones; U.S. Virgin Islands	4:02.93	Alexandre Gauthierot; Guadeloupe	4:03.26
5000 metres	Keveroy Venson; Jamaica	15:24.57	Alexandre Gauthierot; Guadeloupe	15:25.08	Gabriel Curtis; Bahamas	15:31.35
110 metres hurdles (99 cm) (+3.0 m/s)	Orlando Bennett; Jamaica	13.35	Jeanice Laviolette; Guadeloupe	13.52	Alex Robinson; Bahamas	13.57
400 metres hurdles (91.4 cm)	Rovane Williams; Jamaica	50.69	Ramsey Angela; Curaçao	50.75	Malik James-King; Jamaica	51.00
High jump	Jaden Bernabela; Curaçao	2.08m	Kyle Alcine; Bahamas	2.08m	Arnaud Dupe-Agot; Martinique	2.05m
Pole vault ^{†}	Baptiste Thiery; Martinique	5.05m CR	Vano Rahming; Bahamas	3.40m	Tristan Hanna; Bahamas	3.20m
Long jump	Wayne Pinnock; Jamaica	7.46m	Safin Wills; Jamaica	7.28m	Denvaughn Whymns; Bahamas	7.13m
Triple jump	Johnaton Miller; Barbados	15.62m	Safin Wills; Jamaica	15.43m	Taeco Ogarro; Antigua and Barbuda	15.38m
Shot put (6.0 kg)	Zico Campbell; Jamaica	17.90m	Konnel Jacob; Trinidad and Tobago	17.27m	Triston Gibbons; Barbados	17.01m
Discus throw (1.75 kg)	Roje Stona; Jamaica	63.77m	Kai Chang; Jamaica	60.63m	Triston Gibbons; Barbados	53.31m
Javelin throw (800 gr)	Tyriq Horsford; Trinidad and Tobago	68.15m	Zion Hill; Barbados	63.12m	Sean Rolle; Bahamas	62.44m
Octathlon ^{†}	Wikenson Fenelon; Turks and Caicos Islands	5293	Franklyn Stanisclaus; Trinidad and Tobago	5039	Joel Andrews; Trinidad and Tobago	5028
4 × 100 metres relay	Jamaica; Ryiem Robertson; Christopher Taylor; Xavier Nairne; Michael Bentley	39.56	Trinidad and Tobago; Ako Hislop; Onal Mitchell; Timothy Frederick; Tyrell Edwards	40.29	Barbados; Nathan Ferguson; Antonio Hoyte-Small; Matthew Clarke; Kuron Griffith	40.43
4 × 400 metres relay	Jamaica; Malik James-King; Dashawn Morris; Antonio Watson; Christopher Taylor	3:06.62	Barbados; Antonio Hoyte-Small; Rasheeme Griffith; Tafari Bishop; Jonathan Jones	3:08.31	Trinidad and Tobago; Justen O'Brien; Che Lara; Jabari Fox; Onal Mitchel	3:11.30

^{†}: Open event for both junior and youth athletes.

=== Girls U-20 (Junior) ===
Event	Gold		Silver		Bronze	
100 metres (+1.2 m/s)	Michae Harriott; Jamaica	11.39	Ockera Myrie; Jamaica	11.46	Akilah Lewis; Trinidad and Tobago	11.51
200 metres (+2.4 m/s)	Ockera Myrie; Jamaica	23.34	Gemima Joseph; French Guiana	23.70	Devine Parker; Bahamas	23.77
400 metres	Doneisha Anderson; Bahamas	53.58	Charokee Young; Jamaica	53.63	Janielle Josephs; Jamaica	54.45
800 metres	Shaquena Foote; Jamaica	2:07.56	Chrissani May; Jamaica	2:09.00	Joanna Archer; Guyana	2:11.62
1500 metres	Shaqueena Foote; Jamaica	4:46.56	Chrissani May; Jamaica	4:47.52	Kezra Murray; Guyana	4:52.88
3000 metres ^{†}	Monifa Green; Jamaica	10:18.25	Kayan Green; Jamaica	10:29.12	Anaelle Nachon; Guadeloupe	10:35.41
100 metres hurdles (84 cm) (+1.0 m/s)	Amoi Brown; Jamaica	13.15 CR	Daszay Freeman; Jamaica	13.39	Sasha Wells; Bahamas	13.44
400 metres hurdles (76 cm)	Shiann Salmon; Jamaica	56.22 CR	Sanique Walker; Jamaica	57.97	Reanda Richards; Saint Kitts and Nevis	59.83
High jump	Lamara Distin; Jamaica	1.85m	Glenka Antonia; Curaçao	1.81m	Sakari Famous; Bermuda	1.79m
Long jump	Chantoba Bright; Guyana	5.95m	Lotavia Brown; Jamaica	5.70m	Nasya Ramirez; Curaçao	5.65m
Triple jump	Leone Farquharson; Jamaica	12.24m	Lotavia Brown; Jamaica	12.23m	Chantoba Bright; Guyana	12.14m
Shot put (4.0 kg)	Aiko Jones; Jamaica	13.53m	Lacee Barnes; Cayman Islands	13.40m	Ianna Monique Roach; Trinidad and Tobago	12.91m
Discus throw (1.0 kg)	Lacee Barnes; Cayman Islands	49.81m	Marie Forbes; Jamaica	45.72m	Aiko Jones; Jamaica	43.46m
Javelin throw (600 gr)	Talena Murray; Trinidad and Tobago	45.54m	Daneliz Thomas; Cayman Islands	42.13m	Kymoi Noray; Trinidad and Tobago	41.80m
Heptathlon ^{†}	Peter-Gay McKenzie; Jamaica	4529	Safiya John; Trinidad and Tobago	4364	Jean Allard-Saint-Albin; Martinique	4300
4 × 100 metres relay	Jamaica; Ockera Myrie; Michae Harriott; Ray-Donna Lee; Amoi Brown	44.73	Bahamas; Denisha Cartwright; Devine Parker; Lakelle Kinteh; Sasha Wells	46.45	Turks and Caicos Islands; Auriane Lina; Laetitia Bapte; Kelty Disy; Kimberly Glanny	46.48
4 × 400 metres relay	Saint Vincent and the Grenadines; Annecia Richards; Shafiqua Maloney; Zita Vincent; Tamara Woodley	3:48.24	Guyana; Joanna Archer; Chantoba Bright; Kezra Murray; Kenisha Phillips	3:54.38	Saint Kitts and Nevis; Reanda Richards; Jerencia Jeffers; Aliah Vanterpool; Nickeisha Howe	4:00.53

^{†}: Open event for both junior and youth athletes.

=== Boys U-18 (Youth) ===
Event	Gold		Silver		Bronze	
100 metres (+1.1 m/s)	Andre Bent; Jamaica	10.68	Terrique Stennett; Jamaica	10.70	Darian Clarke; Barbados	10.86
200 metres (+2.2 m/s)	Rajay Morris; Jamaica	21.25	Andre Bent; Jamaica	21.45	Terrence Jones; Bahamas	21.69
400 metres	Avindale Smith; Trinidad and Tobago	47.54	Raymond Oriaki; Bahamas	47.75	Malachi Johnson; Jamaica	48.42
800 metres	Handal Roban; Saint Vincent and the Grenadines	1:56.83	J'Voughnn Blake; Jamaica	1:57.64	Giovouni Henry; Jamaica	1:58.32
1500 metres	J'Voughnn Blake; Jamaica	4:08.73	Mitchell Curtis; Bahamas	4:13.41	Murphy Nash; Guyana	4:13.59
3000 metres	Mitchell Curtis; Bahamas	9:04.65	Giovouni Henry; Jamaica	9:04.98	Gianni Henry; Jamaica	9:21.97
110 metres hurdles (91.4 cm) (+1.9 m/s)	Vashaun Vasciani; Jamaica	13.60	Javel Granville; Jamaica	13.77	Raymond Oriaki; Bahamas	13.94
400 metres hurdles (84 cm)	Devontie Archer; Jamaica	52.85	Kyle Gale; Barbados	54.45	Raymond Oriaki; Bahamas	54.54
High jump	Romaine Beckford; Jamaica	2.00m	Tyler Missick; Bahamas	1.90m	Christian Sturrup; Bahamas	1.90m
Long jump	Jordan Turner; Jamaica	6.92m	Savion Joseph; Trinidad and Tobago	6.89m (w)	Luke Brown; Jamaica	6.87m
Triple jump	Latrell Taylor; Bahamas	14.10m	Chima Johnson; Bahamas	13.76m	Jordan Turner; Jamaica	13.74m
Shot put (5.0 kg)	Zackery Dillon; Jamaica	16.40m	Ralford Mullings; Jamaica	15.49m	Tarajh Hudson; Bahamas	14.01m
Discus throw (1.50 kg)	Zackery Dillon; Jamaica	57.15m	Ralford Mullings; Jamaica	53.81m	Tarajh Hudson; Bahamas	46.94m
Javelin throw (700 gr)	Veayon Joseph; Trinidad and Tobago	55.92m	Keyshawn Strachan; Bahamas	50.14m	Katrell Pierre; Turks and Caicos Islands	45.24m
4 × 100 metres relay	Jamaica; Javel Granville; Vashaun Vasciani; Rajay Morris; Terrique Stennett	41.04	Cayman Islands; Silver Hurlston; Neil Brown-McLennon; Errol Smith; Derrick Francis	44.29	Turks and Caicos Islands; Darren Pierret; Wooslyn Harvey; Daveon Durham; Joshua Meghoo	44.34
4 × 400 metres relay	Jamaica; Zidane Brown; Devontie Archer; Raheim Scott; Malachi Johnson	3:14.99	Bahamas; Ethan Hanna; Kendrick Major; Davonte Forbes; Raymond Oriaki	3:18.81	Saint Kitts and Nevis; Junior Rouse; Sharim Hamilton; Timothy Caines; D'Atyrel Stanley	3:26.85

=== Girls U-18 (Youth) ===
Event	Gold		Silver		Bronze	
100 metres (+1.6 m/s)	Briana Williams; Jamaica	11.27	Jaida Knowles; Bahamas	11.68	Soniya Jones; Antigua and Barbuda	11.75
200 metres (+1.1 m/s)	Briana Williams; Jamaica	23.11	Shaniqua Bascombe; Trinidad and Tobago	23.75	Jaida Knowles; Bahamas	23.85
400 metres	Megan Moss; Bahamas	53.19	Daniella Deer; Jamaica	53.95	Deshanya Skeete; Guyana	54.15
800 metres	Trishanni Warner; Saint Kitts and Nevis	2:15.73	Cheriece Cope; Jamaica	2:15.96	Rushana Dwyer; Jamaica	2:16.46
1500 metres	Rushana Dwyer; Jamaica	4:47.90	Theresa Graham; Jamaica	4:48.30	Shaquka Tyrell; Guyana	4:55.97
100 metres hurdles (76 cm) (+1.7 m/s)	Crystal Morrison; Jamaica	13.11 CR	Ackera Nugent; Jamaica	13.35	Sarah Belle; Barbados	13.55
400 metres hurdles (76 cm)	Colisha Taylor; Jamaica	1:01.04 CR	Indea Cartwright; Bahamas	1:02.17	Patrice Richards; Trinidad and Tobago	1:02.56
High jump	Shantae Foreman; Jamaica	1.74m	Vanessa Mercera; Curaçao	1.71m	M'Kayla White; Bahamas	1.65m
Long jump	Ackelia Smith; Jamaica	5.91m (w)	Velecia Williams; Jamaica	5.73m	Anthaya Charlton; Bahamas	5.64m
Triple jump	Ackelia Smith; Jamaica	12.58m	Velecia Williams; Jamaica	12.31m	Princess Browne; Guyana	11.97m
Shot put (3.0 kg)	Thamera Manette; Martinique	14.51m	Kelsie Murrel-Ross; Grenada	14.14m	Treneese Hamilton; Dominica	13.14m
Discus throw (1.0 kg)	Shanice Hutson; Barbados	41.56m	Cheyanne Fearon; Jamaica	34.57m	Treneese Hamilton; Dominica	33.58m
Javelin throw (500 gr)	Rhema Otabor; Bahamas	44.21m	Rowland Kirton-Browne; Barbados	42.77m	Gianisa Olbino; Curaçao	40.70m
4 × 100 metres relay	Jamaica; Briana Williams; Sashieka Steele; Serena Cole; Tia Clayton	44.95	Bahamas; Anthaya Charlton; Jaida Knowles; Danielle Saunders; Megan Moss	46.24	Cayman Islands; Tori-Ann Gonez; Ashantae Graham; Jaden Francis; Danneika Lyn	47.74
4 × 400 metres relay	Jamaica; Oneika McAnnuff; Garriel White; Colisha Taylor; Daniella Deer	3:38.39	Bahamas; Jasmine Knowles; Angel Pratt; Ebony Kelly; Megan Moss	3:48.03	Trinidad and Tobago; Shaniqua Bascombe; Rae-Anne Serville; Malika Coutain; Natasha Fox	3:49.64

== Medal table ==
Rank	Nation	Gold	Silver	Bronze	Total
1	Jamaica (JAM)	44	27	11	82
2	Bahamas (BAH)	6	14	15	35
3	Trinidad and Tobago (TTO)	4	6	7	17
4	Barbados (BAR)	3	5	5	13
5	Saint Vincent and the Grenadines (VIN)	2	0	0	2
6	Curaçao (CUW)	1	3	3	7
7	Cayman Islands (CAY)	1	3	1	5
8	Guyana (GUY)	1	1	7	9
9	Turks and Caicos Islands (TCA)	1	1	2	4
10	Martinique (MTQ)	1	0	3	4
10	Saint Kitts and Nevis (SKN)	1	0	3	4
12	Guadeloupe (GLP)	0	2	2	4
13	French Guiana (GUF)	0	1	0	1
13	Grenada (GRN)	0	1	0	1
13	U.S. Virgin Islands (ISV)	0	1	0	1
16	Antigua and Barbuda (ATG)	0	0	2	2
16	Dominica (DMA)	0	0	2	2
18	Bermuda (BER)	0	0	1	1
18	British Virgin Islands (IVB)	0	0	1	1
Totals (19 entries)		65	65	65	195
