= Savannah Sutherland =

Canadian sprinter and hurdler

Savannah Sutherland OLY
Personal information
- National team: Canada
- Born: August 7, 2003 (age 22) Saskatoon, Saskatchewan, Canada
- Height: 175 cm (5 ft 9 in)

Sport
- Country: Canada
- Sport: Athletics
- Event: 400 m hurdles
- College team: Michigan Wolverines

Achievements and titles
- Personal bests: 400 m: 51.41 (Geneva 2023); 400 m hurdles: 52.46 NR (Eugene 2025)
Medal record
Women's athletics
Representing Canada
Commonwealth Games
Bronze medal – third place	2026 Glasgow	400m hurdles
World Relays
Bronze medal – third place	2026 Gaborone	4×400 m relay
World U20 Championships
Bronze medal – third place	2021 Nairobi	400 m hurdles

Savannah Sutherland OLY (born August 7, 2003) is a Canadian track and field athlete. She is the 2021 World U20 Championships bronze medallist and 2023 and 2025 NCAA Outdoor champion in the 400 metres hurdles, and holds the Canadian national record in that distance, as well as the national indoor 400 metres record. Sutherland represented Canada at the 2024 Summer Olympics and won the bronze medal in the 400 metres hurdles at the 2026 Commonwealth Games.

== Early life ==
Sutherland was born in Saskatoon and grew up in Borden, Saskatchewan, where she was educated at Borden School. After being identified as a potential competitive sprinter, she attended her first official track meet the week before the 2016 Summer Olympics, which she subsequently identified as a spur to pursue athletics seriously. She finished her schooling at Bishop James Mahoney High School in Saskatoon, in order to have greater access to training facilities and coaches. Her time at Mahoney coincided with the onset of the COVID-19 pandemic, and as a result participation in provincial track and field competitions was at the time severely curtailed. In 2021, Sutherland committed to attend the University of Michigan.

== Athletics career ==
Sutherland competed as a fifteen-year-old at the Canadian under-20 national championships in Montreal in 2019, and won silver in the 100 metres hurdles and bronze in the 200 metres sprint. By 2021, Sutherland reportedly held the most provincial records in Saskatchewan track and field athletics history. Sutherland won titles at the national under-20 level in the 400 metres hurdles, and also won gold in the same event representing Saskatchewan at the 2022 Canada Summer Games.

In her international debut competing for Canada, Sutherland was assigned to the 2021 World Athletics U20 Championships in Nairobi. She set a new personal best time of 57.27 to finish third in the women's 400 metres hurdles. She described the experience as "a little overwhelming" but "very positive overall."

At the collegiate level with the University of Michigan, Sutherland helped the Michigan Wolverines to the Big Ten championship in February 2023. Competing at the 2023 NCAA Indoor Championships later in March, she set a new Canadian national record of 51.60s in the indoor 400 metres. In June, she won the 400 metres hurdles at the NCAA Outdoors Championships in Austin, Texas, running 54.45 to upset favourite Britton Wilson. Following her successful NCAA season, Sutherland was selected for the Canadian delegation for the 2023 World Athletics Championships in Budapest, her debut at the international senior level. She reached the semi-finals of the women's 400 metres hurdles, ultimately finishing sixteenth.

At the start of the 2024 global outdoor athletics calendar, Sutherland ran what was briefly a world-leading time of 54.86 seconds in the women’s 400 metres hurdles at a meet in Gainesville, Florida in early April. She followed that up by running a personal best time of 23.32 seconds in the women’s 200 metres the following week at a meet in Lexington, Kentucky. At the end of the month, she set a new meet record of 55.36 seconds at the Penn Relays. In May, Sutherland won her second Big Ten championship in the 400 metres hurdles in a time of 55.01 seconds. In the preliminaries of the NCAA Outdoor Championships, Sutherland won her qualifying heat in a time of 54.04, breaking Sage Watson's Canadian 400 m hurdles record of 54.32 from 2019. Competing in the final on June 8, she ran another personal best and Canadian record to finish second in 53.26.

Sutherland was named to the Canadian Olympic team for the 2024 Summer Olympics in Paris, which she likened to a "fever dream." Competing in the 400 metres hurdles, she first reached the semi-finals. She finished with the sixth-fastest qualifying time, despite finishing fourth in her semi-final heat, and reached the final in her first appearance at the Olympics. This was the first time a Canadian woman had reached the event final since Rosey Edeh in 1996. Sutherland finished seventh with a time of 53.88. She described the crowds at the Stade de France as "unlike anything I’ve ever experienced." She was then invited to join the Canadian team for the women's 4 × 400 metres relay for the first time, helping them place sixth in the event final. Sutherland said afterward that "this was my first time running on the 4x400 but I’m looking forward to seeing when we work together a couple more times."

In her final collegiate season, Sutherland won the 2025 NCAA Outdoor Championships in Eugene, Oregon, running 52.46 seconds to break the NCAA record of 52.75 set by Sydney McLaughlin-Levrone in 2018. She was named women's track athlete of the year at the 2025 NCAA Division I Outdoor Track & Field National Awards, and was a finalist for The Bowerman, the highest track and field honour awarded by the U.S. Track & Field and Cross Country Coaches Association. Following the end of her NCAA career, Sutherland signed a professional contract with Adidas.

She competed at the 2025 World Athletics Championships in Tokyo, Japan, running 55.68 seconds without qualifying for the semi-finals of the 400 metres hurdles.

Sutherland was selected as part of the Canadian team for the 2026 World Athletics Relays and ran in the mixed 4 x 400 metres relay on the opening day. The following day, she changed to run in the women's 4 x 400 metres as the quartet won the bronze medal in the final.

Sutherland was named in the Canada team for the 2026 Commonwealth Games in Glasgow, Scotland, winning the bronze medal in the 400 metres hurdles behind Emily Newnham of England and gold medal winner Sanique Walker of Jamaica.
