= Mizgin Ay =

Turkish sprinter (born 2000)

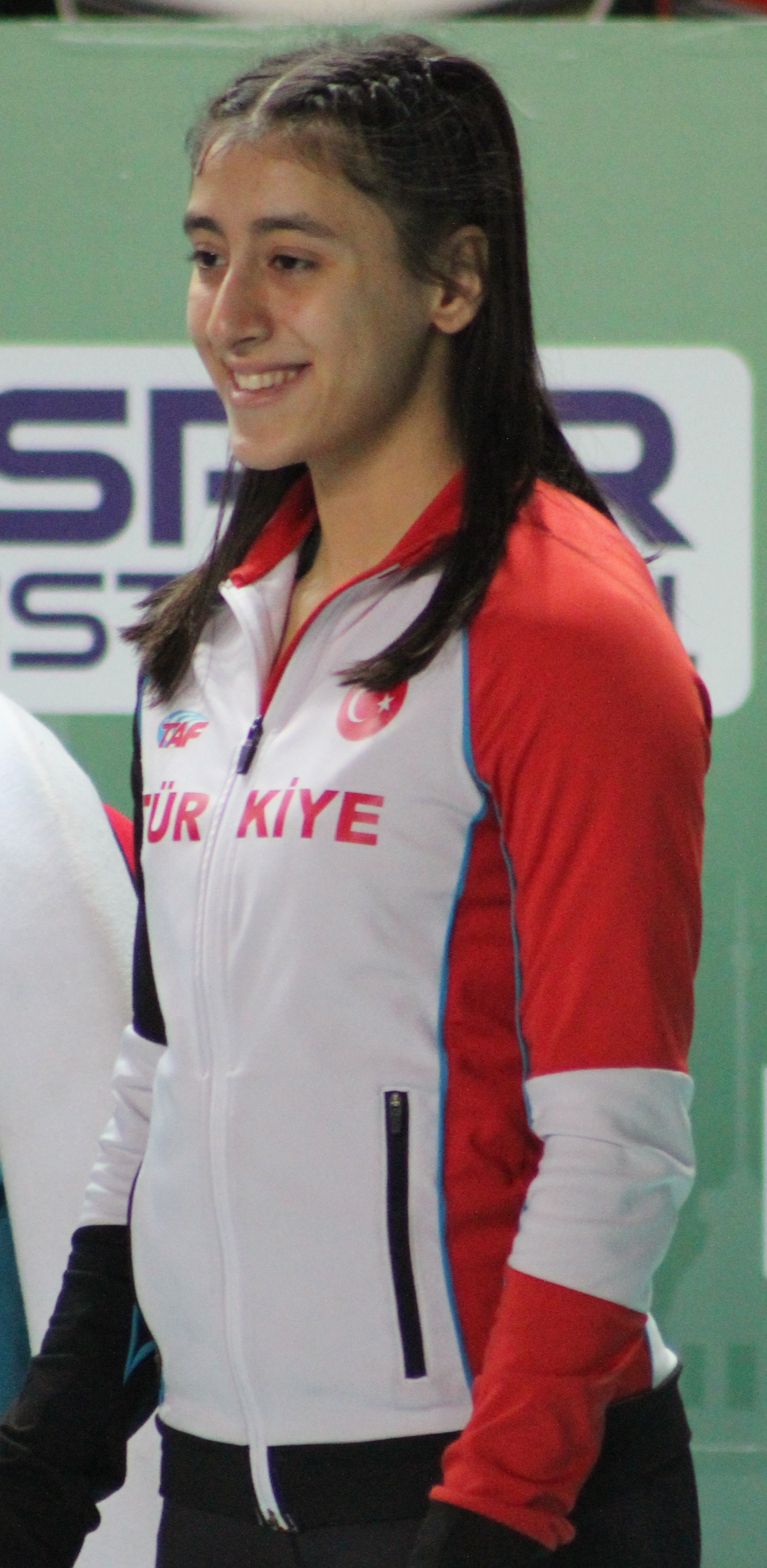
- Ay on 18 February 2018

Personal information
- Nationality: TUR
- Born: 22 June 2000 (age 26) Batman, Turkey

Sport
- Sport: Running
- Events: 100 metres, 200 metres, 400 metres
- Club: Fenerbahçe Athletics

Achievements and titles
- Personal bests: 100 m: 11.53 (Bursa 2018); 200 m: 23.76 (Nairobi 2017)
Medal record
Women's athletics
Representing Turkey
Islamic Solidarity Games
Bronze medal – third place	2017 Baku	100 m
Bronze medal – third place	2017 Baku	4 x 400 m
Balkan Indoor Championships
Silver medal – second place	2020 Istanbul	60 m indoor
Gold medal – first place	2018 Istanbul	60 m indoor
World Youth Championships
Gold medal – first place	2017 Nairobi	100 m
Bronze medal – third place	2017 Nairobi	200 m

Mizgin Ay (born 22 June 2000) is a Kurdish track and field athlete who competes in the 100 m, 200 m and 400 m events for Turkey.

== Early years ==
Mizgin Ay was born to a Kurdish family in Batman, southeastern Turkey on 22 June 2000.

She started with running already in the primary school years. At age ten, her talent in short-distance running was discovered. Two years later, she participated in athletics competitions. In 2014, she became the holder of six gold medals, winning all the competitions she took part in. At age 16, she joined Fenerbahçe Athletics.

== Career ==
Ay won the gold medal in the 100 m and the bronze medal in the 200 m event at the 2017 World Youth Championships in Athletics in Nairobi, Kenya. At the 2017 Islamic Solidarity Games in Baku, Azerbaijan, she won the bronze medal in the 100 m, and another bronze medal in the 4 x 400 m event.

In 2018, she took the gold medal in the 60 m event of the 23rd Balkan Athletics Indoor Championships in Istanbul, Turkey. With her time of 7.38, she set a new national record for U20.

She won the gold medal in the 100 m event at the International Sprint and Relay Cup in Erzurum, Turkey in 2019.

In 2020, she took the silver medal in the 60 m event at the 25th Balkan Indoor Athletics Championships in Istanbul, Turkey.

== Personal bests ==
Event	Result	Venue	Date
100 m	11.57 s (wind: +1.3 m/s)	(Kenya) Nairobi	13 Jul 2017
200 m	23.76 s (wind: -0.7 m/s)	(Kenya) Nairobi	16 Jul 2017
400 m	54.37 s	(Turkey) Ankara	24 Aug 2016

== Competition record ==
Year	Competition	Venue	Position	Event	Notes
Representing Turkey
2017	World Youth Championships	Nairobi, Kenya	1st	100 m	11.62 (wind: +0.5 m/s)
2017	World Youth Championships	Nairobi, Kenya	3rd	200 m	23.76 (wind: -0.7 m/s)
2017	Islamic Solidarity Games	Baku, Azerbaijan	3rd	100 m	11.71 PB
2017	Islamic Solidarity Games	Baku, Azerbaijan	3rd	4 x 400 m	3:41.29
2018	Balkan Indoor Championships	Istanbul, Turkey	1st	60 m	7.38 U20 NR
2019	International Sprint and Relay Cup	Erzurum, Turkey	1st	100 m	
2020	Balkan Indoor Championships	Istanbul, Turkey	2nd	60 m	7.38
