= Orlando Bennett =

Jamaican hurdler

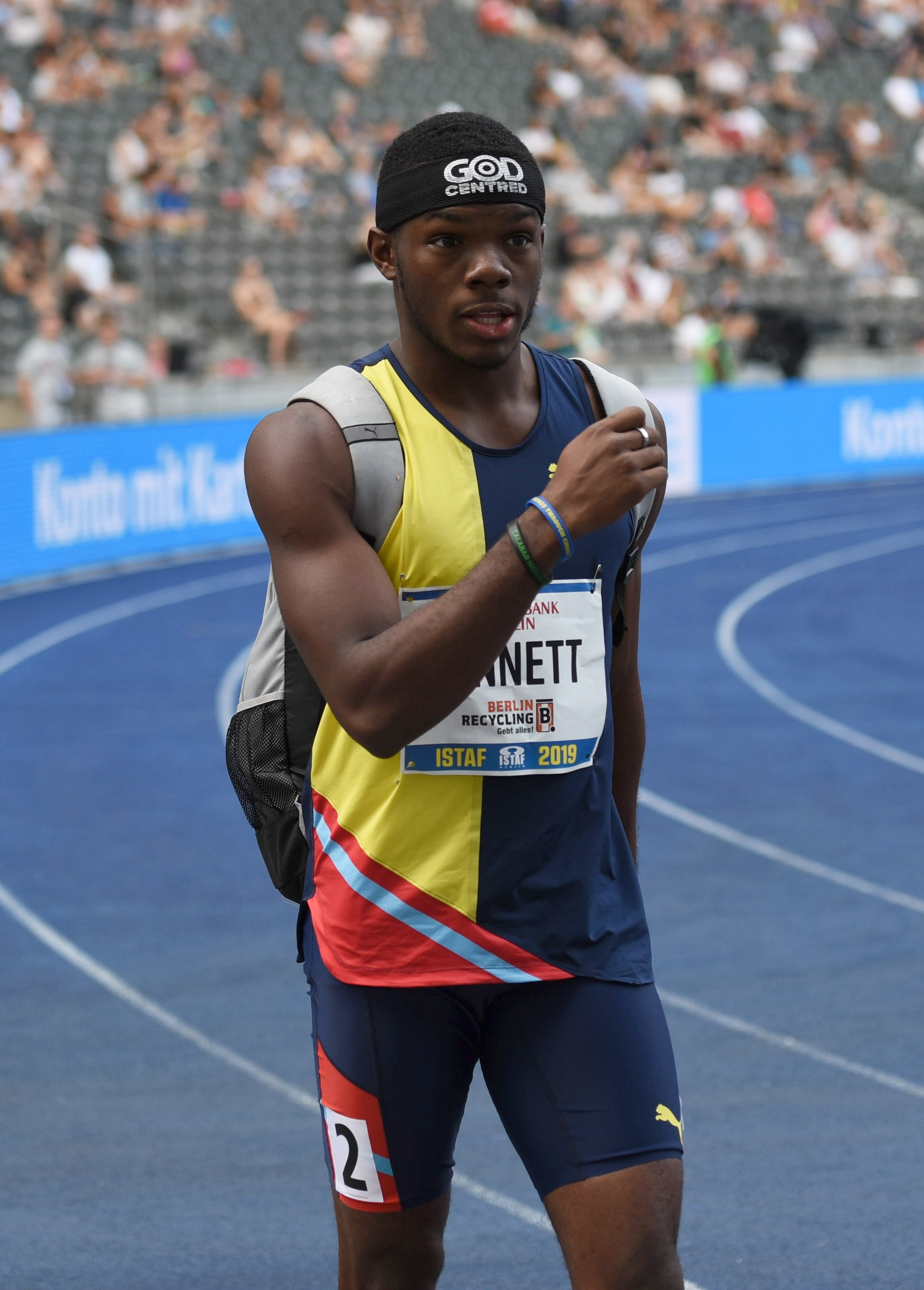
- Bennett in 2019 (ISTAF Berlin)

Personal information
- Nationality: Jamaican
- Born: 12 October 1999 (age 26)

Sport
- Country: Jamaica
- Sport: Athletics
- Events: Hurdling, sprint
- Club: Racers Track Club

Achievements and titles
- Personal bests: 100 m: 10.71; 200 m: 21.84; 110 m hurdles: 13.08
Medal record
Men's athletics
Representing Jamaica
World Championships
Silver medal – second place	2025 Tokyo	110 m hurdles
World U20 Championships
Silver medal – second place	2018 Tampere	110 m hurdles
NACAC Championships
Bronze medal – third place	2022 Freeport	110 m hurdles
NACAC U23 Championships
Gold medal – first place	2021 San José	110 m hurdles
Carifta Games Junior (U20)
Gold medal – first place	2018 Nassau	110 m hurdles
Gold medal – first place	2017 Willemstad	110 m hurdles

Orlando Bennett (born 12 October 1999) is a Jamaican sprint hurdler.

== Biography ==
Bennett attended Calabar High School in St. Andrew, Jamaica. He participated in the 110 metres hurdles at 2018 ISSA Boys and Girls Championships in Kingston, where he placed second in 13.30s personal best at the time.

== Career ==
He qualified for the 2019 World Athletics Championships in Doha where he made the 110 metres hurdles semifinals.

He won the 110 m hurdles gold medal in the 2021 NACAC U23 Championships.

Bennett made the finals of the 110 meter hurdles at the 2024 Olympics, finishing 7th.

In September 2025, he raced to a silver medal in 13.08 PB (-0.3) at the 2025 World Athletics Championships in Tokyo, Japan his first global senior medal.

In Shanghai, China, at the 2026 Diamond League first stop, he ran 13.20s season opener for 4th in the 110 metres hurdles.

== Statistics ==
Grand Slam Track results
Slam	Race group	Event	Pl.	Time	Prize money
2025 Kingston Slam	Short hurdles	110 m hurdles	8th	13.61	US$10,000
2025 Kingston Slam	Short hurdles	100 m	7th	10.77	US$10,000
