= Retshidisitswe Mlenga =

South African sprinter

Personal information
- Born: 27 February 2000 (age 26)

Sport
- Sport: Athletics
- Event: Sprint
- University team: University of Johannesburg

Achievements and titles
- Personal bests: 60 m: 6.81 (Johannesburg 2024); 100 m: 9.99 (Eisenstadt 2025); 150 m: 15.97 (Johannesburg 2024); 200 m: 20.79 (Pretoria 2024)
Medal record
Men's athletics
Representing South Africa
Summer World University Games
Silver medal – second place	2025 Bochum	4×100 m relay
World U18 Championships
Gold medal – first place	2017 Nairobi	200m
Silver medal – second place	2017 Nairobi	100m
Bronze medal – third place	2017 Nairobi	4×100 m relay

Retshidisitswe Mlenga (born 27 February 2000) is a South African track and field sprinter who competes in the 100 metres and 200 metres. He holds a personal best of 9.99 seconds for the 100 m and 20.79 seconds for the 200 m. He was the gold medalist in the 200 m at the IAAF World U18 Championships in 2017.

== Career ==
Mlenga won the South African high school titles in the 100 and 200 m in 2016, then was runner-up in those events at the South African junior championships, setting new bests of 10.45 and 20.96 seconds, respectively. The following year he returned and won both titles at the South African junior meet, earning himself a place on the international team for the 2017 World U18 Championships in Athletics. He was among the favourites to win the 100 m event but was beaten by compatriot Tshenolo Lemao by 0.04 seconds. The pair again took the top two spots on the podium in the 200 m, with Mlenga winning to become the last world youth champion in the event (the championships was in its final iteration). His third and final medal of the tournament came in the mixed 4 × 400 metres relay where, alongside teammate Gontse Morake and 400 m hurdles champions Zeney van der Walt and Sokwakhana Zazini, he finished third in the rankings. Mlenga's performances helped South Africa to the top of the medal table, which was the nation's best ever performance at a global athletics championships.

Mlenga won the 2018 African Southern Region junior title in the 100 m, but was subsequently disqualified, having failed a drug test for the anabolic steroid Stanozolol at a meeting earlier in March that year. Mlenga received a four-year ban from the sport for the infraction.

He was part of the team that won silver at the 4 × 100 m relay at the 2025 Summer World University Games.

== International competitions ==
Year	Competition	Venue	Position	Event	Notes
2017	World U18 Championships	Nairobi, Kenya	2nd	100 m	10.61
2017	World U18 Championships	Nairobi, Kenya	1st	200 m	21.03
2017	World U18 Championships	Nairobi, Kenya	3rd	4 × 400 m relay	3:24.45

== See also ==
- List of doping cases in athletics
