= Kevona Davis =

Jamaican sprinter (born 2001)

Personal information
- Nationality: Jamaican
- Born: 20 December 2001 (age 24) St. James, Jamaica

Sport
- Sport: Athletics
- Event: Sprint
- College team: Texas Longhorns
- Club: Racers Track Club
- Coached by: Glen Mills

Achievements and titles
- Personal bests: 60m: 7.19 (Clemson, 2023); 100m: 10.95 (Lubbock, 2022); 200m: 22.26 (Lubbock, 2022)
Medal record
Women's athletics
Representing Jamaica
World U18 Championships
Bronze medal – third place	2017 Nairobi	100m
CARIFTA Games (U18)
Gold medal – first place	2017 Curacao	100m

Kevona Davis (born 20 December 2001) is a Jamaican track and field athlete who competes as sprinter.

== Early life ==
She is from the village of Little River, St. James, Jamaica. Davis attended Edwin Allen High School in Jamaica before attending the University of Texas to compete for the Texas Longhorns.

== Career ==
As a rising Junior star, she won gold for the 100 metres in 11.43s at the 2017 CARIFTA Games U18 Championships in Curacao.

During the 2018 ISSA Boys and Girls Athletics Championships, she mined gold in Class Two winning the double in Champs record breaking times of 11.16s 100 metres and 22.72s 200 metres and assisted Edwin Allen to its fifth ISSA title on the girls side.

Davis won a bronze medal at the 2017 World Under-18 Championships, held in Nairobi, in the 100 metres. However, injury prevented her from competing at the 2018 CARIFTA Games and the 2018 IAAF World U20 Championships.

At UT, she helped the 4 x 100 metres relay team to Big 12 and NCAA outdoor titles in 2022 and 2023. She was team member with St. Lucia star Julien Alfred on those winning relay teams, and overall women's NCAA Championship title in 2023. In 2024, she claimed a bronze medal in the 100 metres in 11.32s at the Big 12 outdoor competition.

In May 2022, she ran a 100m personal best time of 10.95 in Lubbock, Texas. At the same event, she lowered her 200 metres personal best, first to 22.49 seconds, and then to 22.26.

Davis competed in the 200 metres at the 2023 World Athletics Championships in Budapest in August, 2023 and qualified for the semi-finals.

After graduating from university in 2024, Kevona returned to Jamaica to pursue a professional track and field career under coach Glen Mills.

== Personal life ==
She has two brothers and one sister. After track and field, she wants to practice psychology.
