= 2018 IAAF World U20 Championships – Women's 100 metres hurdles =

Women's 100 metres hurdles at the 2018 World U20 Championships
- Venue: Ratina Stadium
- Dates: 13, 14 and 15 July
- Competitors: 41 from 31 nations
- Winning time: 13.01

Medalists
gold medal	Tia Jones	United States
silver medal	Britany Anderson	Jamaica
bronze medal	Cortney Jones	United States

The women's 100 metres hurdles at the 2018 IAAF World U20 Championships will be held at Ratina Stadium on 13, 14 and 15 July.

== Records ==
Standing records prior to the 2016 IAAF World U20 Championships in Athletics
World Junior Record	Dior Hall (USA)	12.74	Eugene, United States	13 June 2015
Championship Record	Elvira Herman (BLR)	12.85	Bydgoszcz, Poland	24 July 2016
World Junior Leading	Chanel Brissett (USA)	12.75	Palo Alto, United States	13 May 2018

== Results ==
=== Heats ===
Qualification: First 3 of each heat (Q) and the 6 fastest times (q) qualified for the semifinals.

Wind:
Heat 1: -1.3 m/s, Heat 2: -1.1 m/s, Heat 3: -0.9 m/s, Heat 4: -0.7 m/s, Heat 5: -0.3 m/s, Heat 6: -1.1 m/s

Rank	Heat	Name	Nationality	Time	Note
1	6	Tia Jones	United States	13.25	Q
2	2	Britany Anderson	Jamaica	13.37	Q
3	3	Amoi Brown	Jamaica	13.49	Q
4	1	Cortney Jones	United States	13.53	Q
5	5	Şevval Ayaz	Turkey	13.56	Q
6	5	Cyréna Samba-Mayela	France	13.56	Q
7	2	Kendra Leger	Canada	13.59	Q
8	4	Nika Glojnarič	Slovenia	13.61	Q
9	3	Micaela Rosa De Mello	Brazil	13.68	Q
10	4	Keira Christie-Galloway	Canada	13.69	Q
11	5	Yoveinny Mota	Venezuela	13.69	Q
12	1	Jiaru Yu	China	13.71	Q
13	5	Anja Lukić	Serbia	13.77	q
14	4	Klaudia Wojtunik	Poland	13.81	Q
15	6	Yuiri Yoshida	Japan	13.88	Q
16	3	Yuwei Lin	China	13.92	Q
17	6	Lateisha Willis	Australia	13.92	Q
18	3	Saara Keskitalo	Finland	13.93	q
19	6	Sacha Alessandrini	France	13.93	q
20	2	Desola Oki	Italy	13.94	Q
21	1	Molly Scott	Ireland	13.95	Q
22	5	Samantha Johnson	Australia	13.97	q
23	2	Nikoleta Jíchová	Czech Republic	14.00	q
24	6	Milica Emini	Serbia	14.00	q
25	1	Sasha Wells	Bahamas	14.03	
26	4	Nefise Karatay	Turkey	14.03	
27	6	Paula Sprudzane	Latvia	14.05	SB
28	2	Dafni Georgiou	Cyprus	14.06	
29	5	Marisa Vaz Carvalho	Portugal	14.06	
30	2	Larissa Bertényi	Switzerland	14.12	
31	1	Nikol Andonova	Bulgaria	14.14	
32	4	Sapna Kumari	India	14.15	
33	5	Petra-Sofia Laakso	Finland	14.23	
34	3	Nicoleta Turnerová	Czech Republic	14.27	
35	6	Kristina Stensvoll Reppe	Norway	14.27	
36	2	Anastasiya Osokina	Ukraine	14.29	
37	4	Isabel Posch	Austria	14.33	
38	1	Thi My Tien Huynh	Vietnam	14.61	
39	1	Cho Yan Shing	Hong Kong	14.66	
40	3	Marianny Otaño	Dominican Republic	14.79	
	3	Amanda Hansson	Sweden	DQ	

=== Semifinals ===
Qualification: First 2 of each heat (Q) and the 2 fastest times (q) qualified for the final.

Wind:
Heat 1: -1.1 m/s, Heat 2: +0.9 m/s, Heat 3: +0.5 m/s

Rank	Heat	Name	Nationality	Time	Note
1	2	Tia Jones	United States	13.06	Q
2	3	Britany Anderson	Jamaica	13.10	Q, PB
3	1	Cortney Jones	United States	13.24	Q
4	3	Şevval Ayaz	Turkey	13.28	Q, NJR
5	3	Kendra Leger	Canada	13.46	q
6	3	Jiaru Yu	China	13.47	q
6	2	Cyréna Samba-Mayela	France	13.47	Q
8	2	Nika Glojnarič	Slovenia	13.47	
9	1	Sacha Alessandrini	France	13.52	Q
10	1	Amoi Brown	Jamaica	13.52	
11	2	Yoveinny Mota	Venezuela	13.54	
12	3	Klaudia Wojtunik	Poland	13.54	PB
13	2	Yuiri Yoshida	Japan	13.55	
14	1	Micaela Rosa De Mello	Brazil	13.63	
15	2	Anja Lukić	Serbia	13.64	NJR
16	3	Desola Oki	Italy	13.70	
17	1	Keira Christie-Galloway	Canada	13.71	
18	1	Yuwei Lin	China	13.76	
19	3	Nikoleta Jíchová	Czech Republic	13.83	
20	2	Samantha Johnson	Australia	13.85	
21	3	Saara Keskitalo	Finland	13.91	
22	1	Milica Emini	Serbia	13.91	
23	1	Lateisha Willis	Australia	13.93	
24	2	Molly Scott	Ireland	13.94	

=== Final ===
Wind: -1.0 m/s

Rank	Heat	Name	Nationality	Time	Note
1st place, gold medalist(s)	5	Tia Jones	United States	13.01(.002)	
2nd place, silver medalist(s)	6	Britany Anderson	Jamaica	13.01(.002)	PB
3rd place, bronze medalist(s)	4	Cortney Jones	United States	13.19	
4	7	Sacha Alessandrini	France	13.34	PB
5	3	Şevval Ayaz	Turkey	13.46	
6	2	Jiaru Yu	China	13.58	
7	1	Kendra Leger	Canada	13.68	
8	8	Cyréna Samba-Mayela	France	14.11	
