= 2020 Balkan Athletics Indoor Championships =

- Dates: 15 February
- Host city: Istanbul, Turkey
- Venue: Ataköy Athletics Arena
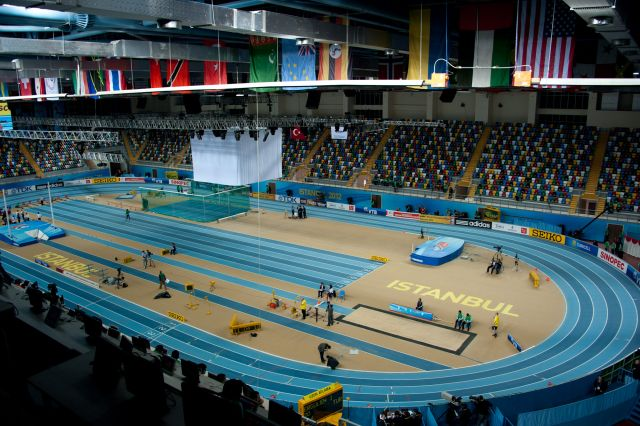
- Level: Senior
- Events: 24
- Participation: 21 nations

The 2020 Balkan Athletics Indoor Championships was the 25th edition of the annual indoor track and field competition for athletes from the Balkans, organised by Balkan Athletics. It was held on 15 February at the Ataköy Athletics Arena in Istanbul, Turkey.

In a closely contested competition, Romania and Ukraine each won five gold medals. Turkey won the most medals overall, with a haul of 16, followed by Romania on 12. Romania won the most women's events, with five and also won the most women's medals in total, with five. Ukraine won the most men's events, with three, and Turkey won the most women's medals in total, with ten.

== Medal summary ==
=== Men ===
Event	Gold		Silver		Bronze	
60 metres	Konstantinos Zikos (GRE)	6.66	Umut Uysal (TUR)	6.68	Kayhan Özer (TUR)	6.71
400 metres	Ivan Budzynskyi (UKR)	47.32	Mihai Pîslaru (ROU)	47.49	Batuhan Altıntaş (TUR)	47.55
800 metres	Yevhen Hutsol (UKR)	1:50.05	Abedin Mujezinović (BIH)	1:50.75	Murat Yalçınkaya (TUR)	1:50.86
1500 metres	Elzan Bibić (SRB)	3:50.18	Mitko Tsenov (BUL)	3:50.46	David Nikolli (ALB)	3:50.52
3000 metres	Andreas Vojta (AUT)	7:54.75	Süleyman Bekmezci (TUR)	8:13.93	Yolo Nikolov (BUL)	8:14.55
60 m hurdles	Mikdat Sevler (TUR)	7.83	Stanislav Stankov (BUL)	7.88	Furkan Aktaş (TUR)	7.93
4 × 400 m relay	Slovenia; Jure Grkman; Gregor Grahovac; Žan Rudolf; Luka Janežič	3:12.19; CR, NR	Turkey; Akın Özyürek; Mahsum Korkmaz; Oğuzhan Kaya; Berke Akçam	3:12.25	Romania; Vlad Dulcescu; Constantin Andonii; Mihai Pîslaru; Robert Parge	3:13.86
High jump	Dmytro Nikitin (UKR)	2.24	Tihomir Ivanov (BUL)	2.18	Alperen Acet (TUR)	2.18
Pole vault	Ersu Şaşma (TUR)	5.50	Theodoros Chrisanthopoulos (GRE)	5.40	Nikandros Stylianou (CYP)	5.35
Long jump	Izmir Smajlaj (ALB)	7.91	Yaroslav Isachenkov (UKR)	7.79	Strahinja Jovančević (SRB)	7.79
Triple jump	Nazim Babayev (AZE)	16.92	Levon Aghasyan (ARM)	16.44	Lasha Gulelauri (GEO)	16.29
Shot put	Mesud Pezer (BIH)	20.75	Asmir Kolašinac (SRB)	20.38	Armin Sinančević (SRB)	19.77

=== Women ===
Event	Gold		Silver		Bronze	
60 metres	Diana Vaisman (ISR)	7.36	Mizgin Ay (TUR)	7.38	Milana Tirnanić (SRB)	7.40
400 metres	Andrea Miklós (ROU)	52.64	Irini Vasiliou (GRE)	52.93	Camelia Gal (ROU)	53.27
800 metres	Cristina Bălan (ROU)	2:07.17	Bianca Răzor (ROU)	2:07.18	Ivona Zemunik (CRO)	2:07.99
1500 metres	Roxana Bârcă (ROU)	4:20.33	Natalia Evangelidou (CYP)	4:20.91	Rahime Tekin (TUR)	4:24.51
3000 metres	Luiza Gega (ALB)	8:55.45	Fatma Arık (TUR)	9:18.02	Claudia Prisecaru (ROU)	9:20.92
60 metres hurdles	Ivana Lončarek (CRO)	8.13	Elisavet Pesiridou (GRE)	8.20	Anamaria Nesteriuc (ROU)	8.21
4 × 400 metres relay	Turkey; Zehra Oral; Derya Yıldırım; Zeynep Kuran; Emel Şanlı-Kırçın	3:45.23	Croatia; Ida Šimunčić; Tajana Židov; Ivona Zemunik; Alena Hrušoci	3:45.76	Romania; Cristina Bălan; Florina Pierdevară; Roxana Bârcă; Camelia Gal	3:48.09
High jump	Yuliya Chumachenko (UKR)	1.88	Marija Vuković (MNE)	1.88	Ana Šimić (CRO)	1.86
Pole vault	Yana Hladiichuk (UKR)	4.40	Buse Arıkazan (TUR)	4.20	Michal Tocker (ISR)	3.70
Long jump	Florentina Iusco (ROU)	6.53	Milena Mitkova (BUL)	6.42	Milica Gardašević (SRB)	6.38
Triple jump	Elena Panțuroiu (ROU)	13.75	Paola Borović (CRO)	13.54	Yekaterina Sariyeva (AZE)	13.50 NR
Shot put	Dimitriana Surdu (MDA)	18.11	Emel Dereli (TUR)	17.77	Olha Holodna (UKR)	16.94

== Medal table ==
The host country is highlighted in lavender blue

Rank	Nation	Gold	Silver	Bronze	Total
1	Romania	5	2	5	12
2	Ukraine	5	1	1	7
3	Turkey*	3	7	6	16
4	Albania	2	0	1	3
5	Greece	1	3	0	4
6	Croatia	1	2	2	5
7	Serbia	1	1	4	6
8	Bosnia and Herzegovina	1	1	0	2
9	Azerbaijan	1	0	1	2
9	Israel	1	0	1	2
11	Austria	1	0	0	1
11	Moldova	1	0	0	1
11	Slovenia	1	0	0	1
14	Bulgaria	0	4	1	5
15	Cyprus	0	1	1	2
16	Armenia	0	1	0	1
16	Montenegro	0	1	0	1
18	Georgia	0	0	1	1
Totals (18 entries)		24	24	24	72
