= Christopher Taylor (sprinter) =

Jamaican sprinter (born 1999)

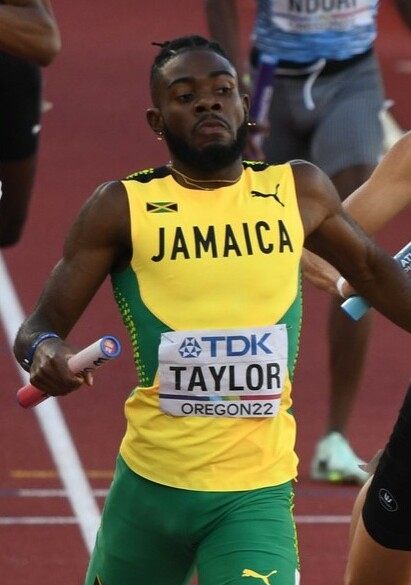
- Taylor in 2022

Personal information
- Nickname: Cubby
- Born: 1 October 1999 (age 27) Spanish Town, Jamaica

Sport
- Country: Jamaica
- Sport: Track and field
- Events: 200 metres; 400 metres
- Club: Tumbleweed (Florida); Dynamic Speed (Jamaica); SprinTec (Jamaica)

Achievements and titles
- Personal bests: 100 m: 10.11 (Kingston 2018); 200 m: 20.11 (Glasgow 2026); 300 m: 32.29 (PoncePR 2022); 400 m: 44.63 (Freeport 2022)
Medal record
Men's track and field
Representing Jamaica
World Championships
Silver medal – second place	2022 Eugene	4×400 m relay
NACAC Championships
Gold medal – first place	2022 Freeport	400 m
Silver medal – second place	2025 Freeport	200 m
Silver medal – second place	2025 Freeport	4 × 100 m relay
Silver medal – second place	2022 Freeport	4×400 m relay
Commonwealth Games
Gold medal – first place	2026 Glasgow	4×400m Mixed
Bronze medal – third place	2026 Glasgow	200 m
NACAC U23 Championships
Gold medal – first place	2021 San José	4x100 m
Gold medal – first place	2021 San José	4x400 m mixed
Silver medal – second place	2021 San José	400 m
World U20 Championships
Silver medal – second place	2018 Tampere	400 m
Silver medal – second place	2018 Tampere	4 × 100 m
Bronze medal – third place	2016 Bydgoszcz	4×400 m relay
Pan American U20 Championships
Gold medal – first place	2017 Trujillo	200m
Silver medal – second place	2017 Trujillo	4x100m
Silver medal – second place	2017 Trujillo	4x400m
World Youth Championships
Gold medal – first place	2015 Cali	400 m
CARIFTA Games (U20)
Gold medal – first place	2017 Willemstad	400 m
Gold medal – first place	2017 Willemstad	4x100 m
Silver medal – second place	2017 Willemstad	4x400 m
Gold medal – first place	2018 Nassau	200 m
Gold medal – first place	2018 Nassau	4x100 m
Gold medal – first place	2018 Nassau	4x400 m
CARIFTA Games (U18)
Gold medal – first place	2015 Basseterre	400 m
Gold medal – first place	2015 Basseterre	4×400 m relay
Gold medal – first place	2016 St. George's	400 m
Gold medal – first place	2016 St.George's	4×400 m relay
Gold medal – first place	2016 St.George's	4×100 m relay

Christopher Taylor (born 1 October 1999) is a Jamaican 400 metres runner. He also, runs the 200 metres.

== Biography ==
Taylor attended Calabar High School in St. Andrew, Jamaica.

== Career ==
He won the 400 metres event at the 2015 World Youth Championships in Athletics in Cali, Colombia in 45.27 seconds, a Jamaica Youth Record. Taylor also won the U-18 400 metres at the 2015 CARIFTA Games in a championship record time of 46.64.

On 19 March 2016, Christopher Taylor delivered an extraordinary performance at the ISSA High School Championships in Jamaica, breaking national records and making a massive contribution in bringing Calabar High School, to their 7th consecutive victory. He also won the 2018 Jamaica Senior National Championships with a personal best and NJR of 44.88.

He won the 400m event in 45.38s at the 2018 IAAF World U20 Championships - Men's 400 metres in Tampere, Finland.

He won the 400 m hurdles silver medal and the gold in 4x100 m and 4x400 m mixed relays in the 2021 NACAC U23 Championships.

At the 2020 Olympics, he finished second in his 400m semifinal in a season best 44.92, but was taken off the track in a wheelchair due to pain, so he did not compete in the final.

On two separate occasions, he garnered a 200m silver in 20.32 and 400m gold in 44.63 PB/CR at the NACAC senior championships.

In 2023, he received a two years suspension for whereabouts violation from the AIU that ended in 2025.

2025 saw his return to race the 200 metres clocking a 20.21 personal best for fifth in the semifinals, but did not advance to the finals at the 2025 World Athletics Championships in Tokyo, Japan.
