= Megan Moss =

Bahamian sprinter

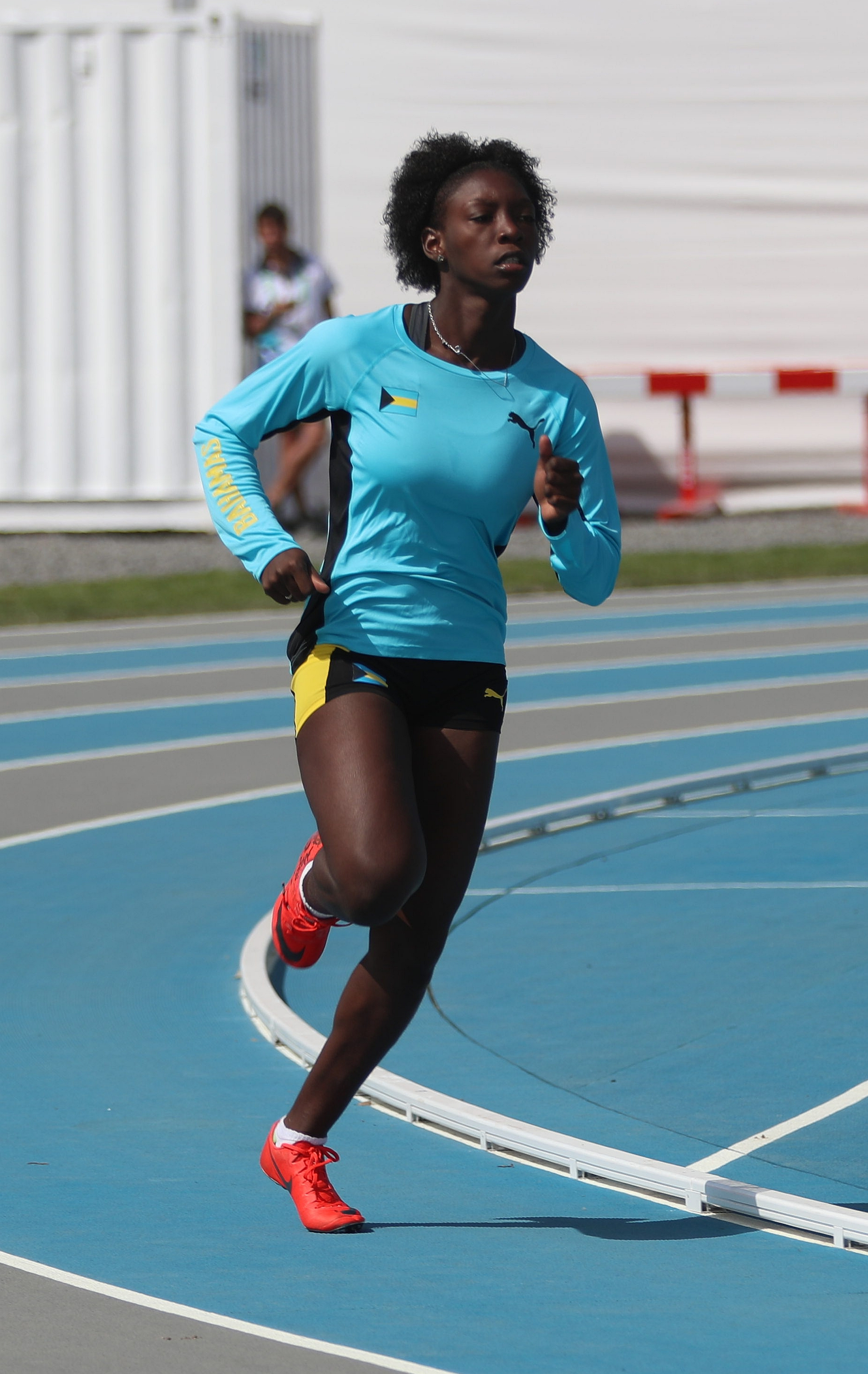
- Moss in 2018

Personal information
- Nationality: Bahamian
- Born: 22 March 2002 (age 24)

Sport
- Sport: Athletics
- Event: 400 metres
Medal record
Athletics
Representing Bahamas
CARIFTA Games Junior (U17)
Gold medal – first place	2017 Willemstad	400 meters
Gold medal – first place	2017 Willemstad	4x100 m
Gold medal – first place	2018 Nassau	400 meters
Silver medal – second place	2016 St. George's	4x100 m
Silver medal – second place	2016 St. George's	4x400 m
Silver medal – second place	2018 Nassau	4x100 m
Silver medal – second place	2018 Nassau	4x400 m

Megan Moss (born 22 March 2002) is a Bahamian athlete. She competed in the women's 4 × 400 metres relay event at the 2020 Summer Olympics. Moss also competed at the 2022 World Athletics Indoor Championships – Women's 400 metres in Belgrade, Serbia.
