= 2017 CARIFTA Games =

XLVI CARIFTA Games
- Dates: 15–17 April
- Host city: Willemstad, Curaçao
- Venue: Ergilio Hato Stadium
- Level: Junior and Youth
- Events: Junior: 34 (incl. 3 open), Youth: 30
- Participation: 28 nations
- Records set: 10

The 2017 CARIFTA Games took place between 15 and 17 April 2017. The event was held at the Ergilio Hato Stadium in Willemstad, Curaçao. A report of the event was given by the IAAF.

== Austin Sealy Award ==
The Austin Sealy Trophy for the most outstanding athlete of the games was awarded to Glenn Kunst of Curaçao.

== Medal summary ==
=== Boys U-20 (Junior) ===
Event	Gold		Silver		Bronze	
100 metres (-1.1 m/s)	Compton Caesar; Guyana	10.46	Jaquone Hoyte; Barbados	10.46	Jelani Walker; Jamaica	10.61
200 metres (-0.7 m/s)	Jamal Walton; Cayman Islands	21.29	Jerrod Elcock; Trinidad and Tobago	21.54	Compton Caesar; Guyana	21.57
400 metres	Christopher Taylor; Jamaica	45.97	Jamal Walton; Cayman Islands	46.46	Joshua St Clair; Trinidad and Tobago	47.02
800 metres	Johnathan Jones; Barbados	1:51.51	Agerian Jackson; Jamaica	1:52.07	Lidji Mbaye; Guadeloupe	1:52.59
1500 metres	Ackeen Colley; Jamaica	3:55.83	Anferne Headecker; Guyana	3:58.22	Dominic Dyer; Cayman Islands	3:59.33
5000 metres	Dominic Dyer; Cayman Islands	15:55.02	Kalique St Jean; Antigua and Barbuda	16:02.77	Shemar Salmon; Jamaica	17:00.50
110 metres hurdles (99 cm) (+1.0 m/s)	Orlando Bennett; Jamaica	13.60	Tavonte Mott; Bahamas	13.64	Alex Robinson; Jamaica	13.72
400 metres hurdles (91.4 cm)	Ronaldo Griffiths; Jamaica	52.01	Timor Barrett; Jamaica	52.32	Rivaldo Leacock; Barbados	52.44
High jump	Jermaine Francis; Saint Kitts and Nevis	2.22m CR	Kyle Alcine; Bahamas	2.18m	Jyles Etienne; Bahamas	2.16m
Pole vault ^{†}	Glenn Kunst; Curaçao	4.65m CR	Baptiste Thiery; Martinique	4.50m	Douvankiyli Rolle; Bahamas	4.30m
Long jump	Carey McLeod; Jamaica	7.62m (-0.4 m/s)	Holland Martin; Bahamas	7.33m (-0.2 m/s)	Enzo Hodebar; Guadeloupe	7.33m (+0.9 m/s)
Triple jump	Tamar Greene; Bahamas	15.87m (-1.2 m/s)	Carey McLeod; Jamaica	15.81m (-0.8 m/s)	Enzo Hodebar; Guadeloupe	15.61m (-0.9 m/s)
Shot put (6.0 kg)	Kevin Nedrick; Jamaica	19.29m	Kyle Mitchell; Jamaica	18.72m	Isaiah Taylor; Trinidad and Tobago	17.18m
Discus throw (1.75 kg)	Roje Stona; Jamaica	66.41m CR	Kevin Nedrick; Jamaica	60.38m	Konnel Jacob; Trinidad and Tobago	57.28m
Javelin throw (800 gr)	Keyon Burton; Dominica	62.14m	Kalvin Marcus; Barbados	60.40m	Kevin Nedrick; Jamaica	58.33m
Octathlon ^{†}	Aaron Worrell; Barbados	5461	Wikenson Fenelon; Turks and Caicos Islands	5460	Kerlon Ashby; Trinidad and Tobago	5247
4 × 100 metres relay	Jamaica; Christopher Taylor; Jelani Walker; Tyreke Bryan; Delano Dunkley	40.10	Trinidad and Tobago; Onil Mitchell; Jalen Purcell; Tyrell Edwards; Jerrod Elcock	40.24	Bahamas; Tavonte Mott; Javan Martin; Johnathan Smith; Karon Dean	40.59
4 × 400 metres relay	Trinidad and Tobago; Elijah Martin; Joshua St Clair; Judah Taylor; Kashief King	3:09.32	Jamaica; Malik Smith; Timor Barrett; Dashawn Morris; Christopher Taylor	3:10.34	Bahamas; Lavardo Handfield; Bradley Dormeus; Holland Martin; Michael Stuart	3:18.03

^{†}: Open event for both junior and youth athletes.

=== Girls U-20 (Junior) ===
Event	Gold		Silver		Bronze	
100 metres (-1.9 m/s)	Khalifa St Fort; Trinidad and Tobago	11.56	Aneka Brissett; Jamaica	11.57	Halle Hazzard; Grenada	11.67
200 metres (+0.5 m/s)	Khalifa St Fort; Trinidad and Tobago	23.99	Halle Hazzard; Grenada	24.15	Kasheika Cameron; Jamaica	24.28
400 metres	Junelle Bromfield; Jamaica	53.82	Tiana Bowen; Barbados	55.62	Kimorla Mushette; Jamaica	55.62
800 metres	Chrissani May; Jamaica	2:12.43	Quanisha Marshall; Bahamas	2:16.20	Kara Grant; Jamaica	2:17.21
1500 metres	Britnie Dixon; Jamaica	4:58.79	Kara Grant; Jamaica	4:59.06	Qyone Antersijn; Curaçao	5:17.03
100 metres hurdles (84 cm) (+0.4 m/s)	Amoi Brown; Jamaica	13.44	Janeek Brown; Jamaica	13.49	Laetitia Bapte; Martinique	13.79
400 metres hurdles (76 cm)	Nicolee Foster; Jamaica	58.84	Shiann Salmon; Jamaica	59.59	Tiana Bowen; Barbados	1:02.80
High jump	Shiann Salmon; Jamaica	1.76m	Daejha Moss; Bahamas	1.73m	Lorean Murray; Jamaica	1.73m
Long jump	Tissanna Hickling; Jamaica	6.22m (-1.9 m/s)	Tyra Gittens; Trinidad and Tobago	6.10m (-1.8 m/s)	Daejha Moss; Bahamas	5.86m (-1.5 m/s)
Triple jump	Natricia Hooper; Guyana	13.08m (+2.3 m/s)	Tissanna Hickling; Jamaica	12.87m (+1.9 m/s)	Kala Penn; British Virgin Islands	12.73m (+2.0 m/s)
Shot put (4.0 kg)	Lacee Barnes; Cayman Islands	13.06m NR	Sah-Jay Stevens; Jamaica	13.02m	Fiona Richards; Jamaica	12.80m
Discus throw (1.0 kg)	Fiona Richards; Jamaica	54.19m CR	Laquell Harris; Bahamas	50.42m	Tiara Derosa; Bermuda	47.69m NR
Javelin throw (600 gr)	Sah-Jay Stevens; Jamaica	45.10m	Akira Phillip; British Virgin Islands	44.63m	Asha James; Trinidad and Tobago	43.24m
Heptathlon ^{†}	Tyra Gittens; Trinidad and Tobago	4854	Thélia Ruster; French Guiana	4540	Anya Akili; Trinidad and Tobago	4360
4 × 100 metres relay	Jamaica; Kasheika Cameron; Aneka Brissett; Taqece Duggan; Tissanna Hickling	44.83	Bahamas; Blayre Catalyn; Renee Brown; Rashan Darling; Sasha Wells	46.45	Turks and Caicos Islands; Akia Guerrier; Helcyann Sauver; Shavell Sutherland; Sanadia Forbes	48.85 NR
4 × 400 metres relay	Jamaica; Kimorla Mushette; Nicolee Foster; Shiann Salmon; Junelle Bromfield	3:37.96	Bahamas; Gabrielle Shannon; Quanisha Marshall; Chelsea Smith; D'Ajonae Jayawardana	3:50.38	British Virgin Islands; Shaniyah Caul; L'T'Sha Fahie; Kala Penn; Sh'Kaida Lavacia	3:53.04

^{†}: Open event for both junior and youth athletes.

=== Boys U-18 (Youth) ===
Event	Gold		Silver		Bronze	
100 metres (-2.9 m/s)	Adell Colthrust; Trinidad and Tobago	10.63	Adrian Curry; Bahamas	10.64	Tyreke Wilson; Jamaica	10.69
200 metres (0.9 m/s)	Michael Stephens; Jamaica	21.30	Joel Johnson; Bahamas	21.55	Xavier Nairne; Jamaica	21.58
400 metres	Antonio Watson; Jamaica	47.86	Ramone Lindo; Jamaica	47.99	Colby Jennings; Turks and Caicos Islands	48.26
800 metres	Kimar Farquharson; Jamaica	1:54.65	Tyrese Reid; Jamaica	1:54.79	Roneldo Rock; Barbados	1:56.32
1500 metres	Renardo Johnson; Jamaica	4:09.74	Tyrese Reid; Jamaica	4:09.87	Roneldo Rock; Barbados	4:11.99
3000 metres	Renardo Johnson; Jamaica	9:30.61	Tarees Rhoden; Jamaica	9:30.69	Georges Jean-Elie; Martinique	9:30.75
110 metres hurdles (91.4 cm) (2.4 m/s)	Dejour Russell; Jamaica	13.19	Rasheem Brown; Cayman Islands	13.70	Jeremy Farr; Jamaica	13.71
400 metres hurdles (84 cm)	Rasheeme Griffith; Barbados	51.64	Rovane Williams; Jamaica	52.69	Dashinelle Dyer; Jamaica	53.02
High jump	Shaun Miller; Bahamas	2.06m	Jaden Bernabela; Curaçao	2.03m	Damar Marshall; Jamaica	2.03m
Long jump	Denvaughn Whymns; Bahamas	7.31m (+1.9 m/s)	Sheldon Noble; Antigua and Barbuda	7.03m (-2.8 m/s)	Jaydon Antoine; Trinidad and Tobago	6.97m (+2.0 m/s)
Triple jump	Safin Wills; Jamaica	15.11m (+1.4 m/s)	Johnathan Miller; Barbados	14.85m (+1.0 m/s)	Taeco Ogarro; Antigua and Barbuda	14.56m (+2.4 m/s)
Shot put (5.0 kg)	Daniel Cope; Jamaica	18.17m CR	Djimon Gumbs; British Virgin Islands	17.58m	Cobe Graham; Jamaica	17.33m
Discus throw (1.50 kg)	Daniel Cope; Jamaica	61.25m CR	Djimon Gumbs; British Virgin Islands	60.43m	Cobe Graham; Jamaica	52.71m
Javelin throw (700 gr)	Tyriq Horsford; Trinidad and Tobago	76.50m CR	Sean Rolle; Bahamas	65.51m	Michael Angelo Bullard; Bahamas	63.84m
4 × 100 metres relay	Jamaica	39.97 CR	Bahamas	40.77	Trinidad and Tobago; Adell Colthrust; Avindale Smith; Timothy Frederick; Kinddel Caccington	40.84
4 × 400 metres relay	Barbados; Kyle Gale; Antonio Hoyte-Small; Nathan Fergusson; Rasheeme Griffith	3:14.65	Bahamas; Gareth Lewis; Corey Sherrod; Tyrell Simms; Edward Gayle	3:17.22	Trinidad and Tobago; Tyshawn Grey; Kaylon Thomson kiddel Carrington; Akil Boisson	3:20.85

=== Girls U-18 (Youth) ===
Event	Gold		Silver		Bronze	
100 metres (-1.6 m/s)	Kevona Davis; Jamaica	11.62	Joella Lloyd; Antigua and Barbuda	11.67	Briana Williams; Jamaica	11.80
200 metres (+0.1 m/s)	Michae Harriott; Jamaica	23.73	Devine Parker; Bahamas	23.87	Joella Lloyd; Antigua and Barbuda	24.01
400 metres	Megan Moss; Bahamas	53.69	Kimara Francis; Jamaica	54.24	Doneisha Anderson; Bahamas	54.33
800 metres	Cemore Donald; Jamaica	2:11.28	Shaquena Foote; Jamaica	2:13.44	Shuriant Mathilda; Curaçao	2:15.38
1500 metres	Shaquena Foote; Jamaica	4:45.51	Rushana Dwyer; Jamaica	4:48.15	Claudrice McKoy; Guyana	4:50.88
100 metres hurdles (76 cm) (-2.1 m/s)	Britany Anderson; Jamaica	13.16 CR	Daszay Freeman; Jamaica	13.39	Gabrielle Gibson; Bahamas	14.07
400 metres hurdles (76 cm)	Sanique Walker; Jamaica	58.95 CR	Taffara Rose; Jamaica	1:00.95	Gabrielle Gibson; Bahamas	1:01.29
Long jump	Chantoba Bright; Guyana	5.91m (+0.9 m/s)	Annia Ashley; Jamaica	5.88m (+1.3 m/s)	Lotavia Brown; Jamaica	5.66m (+1.4 m/s)
Triple jump	Lotavia Brown; Jamaica	12.74m (-1.4 m/s)	Lamara Distin; Jamaica	12.40m (-2.5 m/s)	Chantoba Bright; Guyana	12.35m (-2.1 m/s)
Shot put (3.0 kg)	Ianna Roach; Trinidad and Tobago	14.43m	Danielle Sloley; Jamaica	14.12m	Tamera Manette; Martinique	13.86m
Discus throw (1.0 kg)	Marie Forbes; Jamaica	43.62m	Kimone Reid; Jamaica	40.39m	Acacia Astwood; Bahamas	39.40m
Javelin throw (500 gr)	Latia Saunders; Bahamas	45.29m	Kymoi Norai; Trinidad and Tobago	44.98m	Arianna Hayde; British Virgin Islands	41.90m
4 × 100 metres relay	Bahamas; Kendesha Ingraham; Devine Parker; Jaida Knowles; Megan Moss	45.05	Trinidad and Tobago; Akilah Lewis; Ayla Stanisclaus; Rae-Anne Serville; Deleth Charles	46.49	Guadeloupe; Christiana Maniga; Melody Fardella; Krys Vertot; Judy Chalcou	46.84
4 × 400 metres relay	Jamaica; Kimara Francis; Joanne Reid; Shaquena Foote; Sanique Walker	3:38.73	Bahamas; Wendira Moss; Marissa White; Doneisha Anderson; Gabrielle Gibson	3:41.24	Trinidad and Tobago; Joanna Rogers; Caliyah Wallace; Patrice Richards; Rae-Anne Serville	3:43.05

== Medal table ==
Rank	Nation	Gold	Silver	Bronze	Total
1	Jamaica (JAM)	39	28	19	86
2	Trinidad and Tobago (TTO)	7	5	10	22
3	Bahamas (BAH)	6	15	10	31
4	Barbados (BAR)	4	4	4	12
5	Guyana (GUY)	4	1	3	8
6	Cayman Islands (CAY)	3	2	1	6
7	Curaçao (CUW)	1	1	2	4
8	Dominica (DMA)	1	0	0	1
8	Saint Kitts and Nevis (SKN)	1	0	0	1
10	British Virgin Islands (IVB)	0	3	3	6
11	Antigua and Barbuda (ATG)	0	3	2	5
12	Martinique (MTQ)	0	1	3	4
13	Turks and Caicos Islands (TCA)	0	1	2	3
14	Grenada (GRN)	0	1	1	2
15	French Guiana (GUF)	0	1	0	1
16	Guadeloupe (GLP)	0	0	4	4
17	Bermuda (BER)	0	0	2	2
Totals (17 entries)		66	66	66	198
