= 2021 World Athletics U20 Championships – Women's 400 metres hurdles =

Sports competition

Women's 400 metres hurdles at the 2021 World Athletics U20 Championships
- Venue: Kasarani Stadium
- Dates: 19 August (heats); 22 August (final)
- Competitors: 20 from 17 nations
- Winning time: 56.94

Medalists
gold medal	Heidi Salminen	Finland
silver medal	Ludivine Aubert	France
bronze medal	Savannah Sutherland	Canada

The women's 400 metres hurdles at the 2021 World Athletics U20 Championships was held at the Kasarani Stadium on 19 and 22 August.

== Records ==
Standing records prior to the 2021 World Athletics U20 Championships
World U20 Record	Sydney McLaughlin (USA)	53.60	Fayetteville, United States	27 April 2018
Championship Record	Lashinda Demus (USA)	54.70	Kingston, Jamaica	19 July 2002
World U20 Leading	Ashton Lindley (USA)	56.74	Eugene, United States	12 June 2021

== Results ==
=== Heats ===
Qualification: First 2 of each heat (Q) and the 2 fastest times (q) qualified for the final.

Rank	Heat	Name	Nationality	Time	Note
1	1	Heidi Salminen	Finland	58.12	Q, PB
2	3	Savannah Sutherland	Canada	58.45	Q
3	1	Ludivine Aubert	France	58.46	Q
4	2	Garriel White	Jamaica	58.65	Q
5	1	Angelica Ghergo	Italy	58.84	q
6	3	Moseiha Bridgen	Jamaica	58.88	Q
7	3	Maria Tarabanskaya	Authorised Neutral Athletes	59.18	q
8	2	Alicja Kaczmarek	Poland	59.32	Q
9	2	Jada van Staden	South Africa	59.33	
10	3	Aada Aho	Finland	59.50	
11	2	Ilana Hanssens	Belgium	59.60	
12	1	Ester Bendová	Czech Republic	59.91	
13	3	Rahela Leščak	Croatia	1:00.20	
14	2	Anna Konstantina Chatzipourgani	Greece	1:00.67	
15	2	Neža Dolenc	Slovenia	1:01.37	
16	3	Sofia Lavreshina	Portugal	1:01.53	
17	2	Andrea Švecová	Slovakia	1:02.60	
18	1	Agnes Ngumbi	Kenya	1:02.65	PB
19	1	Lara Bezgovšek	Slovenia	1:08.29	
	1	Martha Rasmussen	Denmark	DQ	TR22.6.1
	1	Sarah Ochigbo	Nigeria	DNS	
	3	Charlize Eilerd	South Africa	DNS	

=== Final ===
The final was held on 22 August at 15:00.

Rank	Lane	Name	Nationality	Time	Note
1st place, gold medalist(s)	5	Heidi Salminen	Finland	56.94	PB
2nd place, silver medalist(s)	6	Ludivine Aubert	France	57.16	PB
3rd place, bronze medalist(s)	3	Savannah Sutherland	Canada	57.27	PB
4	2	Angelica Ghergo	Italy	57.69	PB
5	1	Maria Tarabanskaya	Authorised Neutral Athletes	57.96	PB
6	7	Alicja Kaczmarek	Poland	58.62	
7	8	Moseiha Bridgen	Jamaica	58.64	
	4	Garriel White	Jamaica	DNS	
