= Shaquena Foote =

Jamaican sprinter (born 2001)

Personal information
- Nationality: Jamaican
- Born: 23 July 2001 (age 25) Westmoreland, Jamaica

Sport
- Sport: Athletics
- Event: Sprint
- College team: San Diego State Aztecs; Georgia Bulldogs

Achievements and titles
- Personal bests: 60 m: 7.35 (Reno, 2025); 100 m: 11.71 (San Diego, 2025); 200 m: 22.89 (Albuquerque, 2025); 400 m: 50.62 (Gainesville, 2026); Indoor 400m: 51.13 (Fayetteville, 2026)
Medal record
Women's athletics
Representing Jamaica
NACAC U23 Championships
Silver medal – second place	2023 San Jose	4 × 100 m
Silver medal – second place	2023 San Jose	4 × 400 m
Silver medal – second place	2023 San Jose	Mixed 4 × 400 m
World U18 Championships
Silver medal – second place	2017 Nairobi	Mixed 4 × 400 m
CARIFTA Games U20
Gold medal – first place	2019 George Town	400m
Gold medal – first place	2019 George Town	400m hurdles
Gold medal – first place	2018 Nassau	800m
Gold medal – first place	2018 Nassau	1500m
Gold medal – first place	2017 Willemstad	1500m
Gold medal – first place	2017 Willemstad	4 × 400 m relay
Silver medal – second place	2017 Willemstad	800m

Shaquena Foote (born 23 July 2001) is a Jamaican sprinter. In 2026, she ran into the top-five all-time for Jamaica in the 400 metres indoors.

== Biography ==
Foote attended Petersfield High School in Petersfield, Jamaica. She was a CARIFTA Games Under-18 silver medallist over 800 metres in 2017. She was a medalist at the 2017 IAAF World U18 Championships in the mixed 4 × 400 metres relay in Nairobi, Kenya. She won Jamaican age-group titles in 2018 over 800 metres and 1500 metres, and won the U20 800 metres at the 2018 Carifta Games in the Bahamas, but by 2019 had transitioned to the 400 metres hurdles. She won the 400 metres hurdles at the Carifta Trials in 2020 in a personal best time of 57.60 seconds.

== Career ==
Foote was selected to compete for Jamaica at the 2023 NACAC Championships in San Jose, Costa Rica. She won three silver medals at the Championships; in the women's 4 × 100 m relay, women's 4 × 400 m relay, and the mixed 4 × 400 m relay in San Jose, Costa Rica.

== 2025 ==
Competing for San Diego State University she was a semi-finalist over 400 metres at the 2025 NCAA Outdoor Championships in Eugene, Oregon, in June 2025. She placed fifth overall in the 400 metres at the Jamaican Athletics Championships later that month. She was subsequently selected for the Jamaican relay pool for the 2025 World Athletics Championships in Tokyo, Japan.

== 2026 ==
Having transferred to the University of Georgia, Foote began her 2026 indoor season finishing runner-up to compatriot Dejanea Oakley over 300 metres at the Clemson Invitational. The following month, Foote ran an indoor personal best of 51.27 seconds for the 400 metres at the Tiger Paw Invitational in Clemson. Competing at the 2026 NCAA Division I Indoor Track and Field Championships, she qualified for the final of the 400 metres, where she placed fifth with a time of 51.13 seconds, moving her into the top-five all-time for Jamaica in the 400m indoors.
