= Brooke Overholt =

Canadian hurdler (born 2000)

Personal information
- Born: April 2, 2000 (age 26) St. Marys, Ontario, Canada
- Education: Cornell University; Vanderbilt University

Sport
- Sport: Track and field
- Event: 400 metres hurdles
- University team: Vanderbilt Commodores (2022-23); Cornell Big Red (2018-22)
- Club: London Legion T.F. Alliance

Achievements and titles
- Personal best: 400 metres hurdles: 55.50 (Austin 2023)

Brooke Overholt (born 2 April 2000) is a Canadian track and field athlete specializing in the 400 metres hurdles. She competed collegiately for Cornell and Vanderbilt University, and represented Canada at the 2023 World Athletics Championships.

== Early life ==
Overholt was born and raised in Perth County, Ontario to parents Terry and Jody Overholt. She attended St. Michael Catholic Secondary School in Stratford, graduating in 2018.

=== Junior athletics ===
Representing St. Mike's and the London Legion, Overholt medaled at numerous OFSAA and Canadian junior championships, in the 100 and 400 m hurdles as well as the open 400 m.

In 2016, she won silver medals in the 100 m hurdles and 400 m, and a bronze in the 400 m hurdles at the Legion National Youth Track and Field Championships.

Her grade 11 and 12 year, she finished runner up in the 400 m hurdles at the OFSAA Championships. She would graduate high school with personal bests of 8.82 in the 60 m hurdles, 13.77 in the 100 hurdles, 1:01.38 in the 400 m hurdles, and 56.13 in the 400 m.

== Collegiate athletics ==
=== Cornell Big Red ===
In 2018, Overholt enrolled at Cornell University where she would study Human Ecology and compete for the Cornell Big Red track and field team.

In 2019, her first season competing for Cornell, Brooke finished fourth in the 400 m at the Ivy League Indoor Championships and third at the Ivy League Outdoor Championships in the 400 m hurdles, running a personal best of 58.90. The latter performance earned a selection to represent Canada at the 2019 Pan American U20 Championships in San José, Costa Rica. There she would qualify for the final, placing seventh in 59.43. Later that summer, she would claim the Canadian U20 title in 59.29.

In 2021, with a personal best of 57.48 at the NCAA East Preliminary Round, Overholt qualified for the NCAA Outdoor Championships, in Eugene, Oregon. She would run a time of 58.29 in the heats, not advancing to the final.

At the 2022 Ivy League Indoor Championships, Overholt won her first conference title competing in the 400 m in a time of 54.70. Outdoors, she won the 400 m hurdles at the Ivy League Championships. Later that summer, at the Canadian Track and Field Championships, she won a bronze medal in the 400 m hurdles.

=== Vanderbilt Commodores ===
After finishing her undergrad degree at Cornell in 2022, Overholt enrolled at Vanderbilt University as a graduate transfer where she would compete for the Vanderbilt Commodores track and field team.

In 2023, competing for Vanderbilt, Overholt broke the 57-second barrier in the 400 m hurdles for the first time at the SEC Championships in May, finishing fifth. At the NCAA Championships in June, she broke the 56-second barrier, running 55.77 to make the final, followed by a time of 55.50 to finish fourth.

The following month, she finished second at the Canadian Championships, just 0.03 second behind Savannah Sutherland.

In August, she made her global championship debut at the World Athletics Championships in Budapest, Hungary. She finished seventh in her heat in 56.20, finishing 29th overall.

== Competition record ==
Representing Canada
Year	Competition	Venue	Position	Event	Time
2019	Pan Am U20 Championships	San José, Costa Rica	7th	400 metres hurdles	59.43
2023	World Championships	Budapest, Hungary	29th (h)	400 metres hurdles	56.20
