= 2018 IAAF World U20 Championships – Men's 400 metres =

Men's 400 metres at the 2018 World U20 Championships
- Venue: Ratina Stadium
- Dates: 11, 12 and 13 July
- Competitors: 49 from 38 nations
- Winning time: 45.03

Medalists
| gold medal | Jonathan Sacoor | Belgium |
| silver medal | Christopher Taylor | Jamaica |
| bronze medal | Chantz Sawyers | Jamaica |

The men's 400 metres at the 2018 IAAF World U20 Championships was held at Ratina Stadium on 11, 12 and 13 July.

== Records ==
Standing records prior to the 2018 IAAF World U20 Championships in Athletics
| World Junior Record | Steve Lewis (USA) | 43.87 | Seoul, South Korea | 28 September 1988 |
| Championship Record | Hamdan Odha Al-Bishi (KSA) | 44.66 | Santiago, Chile | 20 October 2000 |
| World Junior Leading | Christopher Taylor (JAM) | 44.88 | Kingston, Jamaica | 24 June 2018 |

== Results ==
=== Heats ===
Qualification: First 3 of each heat (Q) and the 3 fastest times (q) qualified for the semifinals.

| Rank | Heat | Name | Nationality | Time | Note |
|---|---|---|---|---|---|
| 1 | 5 | Jonathan Jones | Barbados | 46.05 | Q PB |
| 2 | 6 | Christopher Taylor | Jamaica | 46.14 | Q |
| 3 | 6 | Edoardo Scotti | Italy | 46.52 | Q PB |
| 4 | 4 | Chantz Sawyers | Jamaica | 46.52 | Q |
| 5 | 2 | Jonathan Sacoor | Belgium | 46.56 | Q |
| 6 | 3 | Aruna Dharshana | Sri Lanka | 46.81 | Q |
| 7 | 7 | Myles Misener-Daley | Canada | 46.87 | Q |
| 8 | 6 | Ricky Petrucciani | Switzerland | 47.03 | Q NJR |
| 9 | 3 | Bruno Silva | Brazil | 47.05 | Q |
| 10 | 2 | Matěj Krsek | Czech Republic | 47.05 | Q |
| 11 | 6 | Christian Davis | Australia | 47.07 | q |
| 12 | 5 | Howard Fields | United States | 47.08 | Q |
| 13 | 3 | Klaudio Gjetja | Italy | 47.09 | Q PB |
| 14 | 1 | Khamal Stewart-Baynes | Canada | 47.10 | Q |
| 15 | 5 | Jean Paul Bredau | Germany | 47.11 | Q |
| 16 | 2 | Alfredo Jiménez | Spain | 47.12 | Q PB |
| 17 | 7 | Umajesty Williams | United States | 47.16 | Q |
| 18 | 2 | Ilhwan Mo | South Korea | 47.23 | q |
| 19 | 7 | Kennedy Luchembe | Zambia | 47.25 | Q |
| 20 | 4 | Gabriel Louw | South Africa | 47.32 | Q |
| 21 | 4 | Szymon Kreft | Poland | 47.35 | Q |
| 22 | 4 | Boško Kijanović | Serbia | 47.42 | q PB |
| 23 | 1 | Musa Isah | Bahrain | 47.50 | Q |
| 24 | 7 | Leon Tafirenyika | Zimbabwe | 47.55 | |
| 25 | 3 | Jure Grkman | Slovenia | 47.56 | |
| 26 | 1 | Antonio Grant | Panama | 47.64 | Q |
| 27 | 5 | Iļja Petrušenko | Latvia | 47.66 | |
| 28 | 6 | Laban Kiplangat | Kenya | 47.69 | |
| 29 | 5 | Ondřej Holub | Czech Republic | 47.71 | |
| 30 | 5 | Onal Mitchell | Trinidad and Tobago | 47.77 | |
| 31 | 6 | Lovro Mesec Košir | Slovenia | 47.88 | |
| 32 | 2 | Milad Naseh Jahani | Iran | 47.91 | |
| 33 | 7 | Alaeddine Kebsi | Tunisia | 47.96 | |
| 34 | 2 | Slimane Moula | Algeria | 47.97 | |
| 35 | 4 | Ngoni Joel Chadyiwa | Zimbabwe | 48.04 | |
| 36 | 4 | Shuji Mori | Japan | 48.12 | |
| 37 | 2 | Daichi Sawa | Japan | 48.15 | |
| 38 | 1 | Correy Sherrod | Bahamas | 48.22 | |
| 39 | 5 | Rija Vatomanga Gardiner | Madagascar | 48.31 | |
| 40 | 6 | Sebastian Jakubowski | Poland | 48.39 | |
| 41 | 1 | Abdurahman Abdo | Ethiopia | 48.46 | |
| 42 | 3 | . Gaurav | India | 48.61 | |
| 43 | 7 | Stefano Antoine Bibi | Seychelles | 48.92 | PB |
| 44 | 3 | Mihai Cristian Pîslaru | Romania | 49.74 | |
| | 3 | Colby Jennings | Turks and Caicos Islands | DNF | |
| | 7 | Melkamu Assefa | Ethiopia | DQ | |
| | 4 | Joshua Hartmann | Germany | DNS | |
| | 1 | João Coelho | Portugal | DNS | |
| | 1 | Ahmed Al-Yaari | Yemen | DNS | |

=== Semifinals ===
Qualification: First 2 of each heat (Q) and the 2 fastest times (q) qualified for the final.

| Rank | Heat | Name | Nationality | Time | Note |
|---|---|---|---|---|---|
| 1 | 1 | Jonathan Sacoor | Belgium | 45.72 | Q, NJR |
| 2 | 2 | Edoardo Scotti | Italy | 45.84 | Q, NJR |
| 3 | 3 | Christopher Taylor | Jamaica | 46.18 | Q |
| 4 | 1 | Chantz Sawyers | Jamaica | 46.19 | Q |
| 5 | 2 | Jonathan Jones | Barbados | 46.22 | Q |
| 6 | 3 | Khamal Stewart-Baynes | Canada | 46.38 | Q |
| 7 | 3 | Howard Fields | United States | 46.53 | q |
| 8 | 2 | Myles Misener-Daley | Canada | 46.53 | q |
| 9 | 1 | Matěj Krsek | Czech Republic | 46.59 | NJR |
| 10 | 2 | Umajesty Williams | United States | 46.72 | |
| 11 | 1 | Bruno Silva | Brazil | 46.74 | |
| 12 | 3 | Szymon Kreft | Poland | 46.74 | |
| 13 | 3 | Aruna Dharshana | Sri Lanka | 46.75 | |
| 14 | 2 | Alfredo Jiménez | Spain | 46.93 | PB |
| 15 | 3 | Musa Isah | Bahrain | 46.94 | |
| 16 | 1 | Klaudio Gjetja | Italy | 47.10 | |
| 17 | 2 | Kennedy Luchembe | Zambia | 47.35 | |
| 18 | 1 | Ricky Petrucciani | Switzerland | 47.39 | |
| 19 | 2 | Gabriel Louw | South Africa | 47.63 | |
| 20 | 3 | Jean Paul Bredau | Germany | 47.70 | |
| 21 | 1 | Christian Davis | Australia | 47.86 | |
| 22 | 2 | Boško Kijanović | Serbia | 48.15 | |
| 23 | 1 | Antonio Grant | Panama | 48.23 | |
| | 3 | Ilhwan Mo | South Korea | DQ | |

=== Final ===
| Rank | Lane | Name | Nationality | Time | Note |
|---|---|---|---|---|---|
| 1st place, gold medalist(s) | 5 | Jonathan Sacoor | Belgium | 45.03 | NJR |
| 2nd place, silver medalist(s) | 6 | Christopher Taylor | Jamaica | 45.38 | |
| 3rd place, bronze medalist(s) | 4 | Chantz Sawyers | Jamaica | 45.89 | |
| 4 | 3 | Edoardo Scotti | Italy | 46.20 | |
| 5 | 2 | Howard Fields | United States | 46.53 | |
| 6 | 7 | Khamal Stewart-Baynes | Canada | 46.79 | |
| 7 | 1 | Myles Misener-Daley | Canada | 47.03 | |
| 8 | 8 | Jonathan Jones | Barbados | 48.01 | |
