= Tia Jones =

American track and field athlete (born 2000)

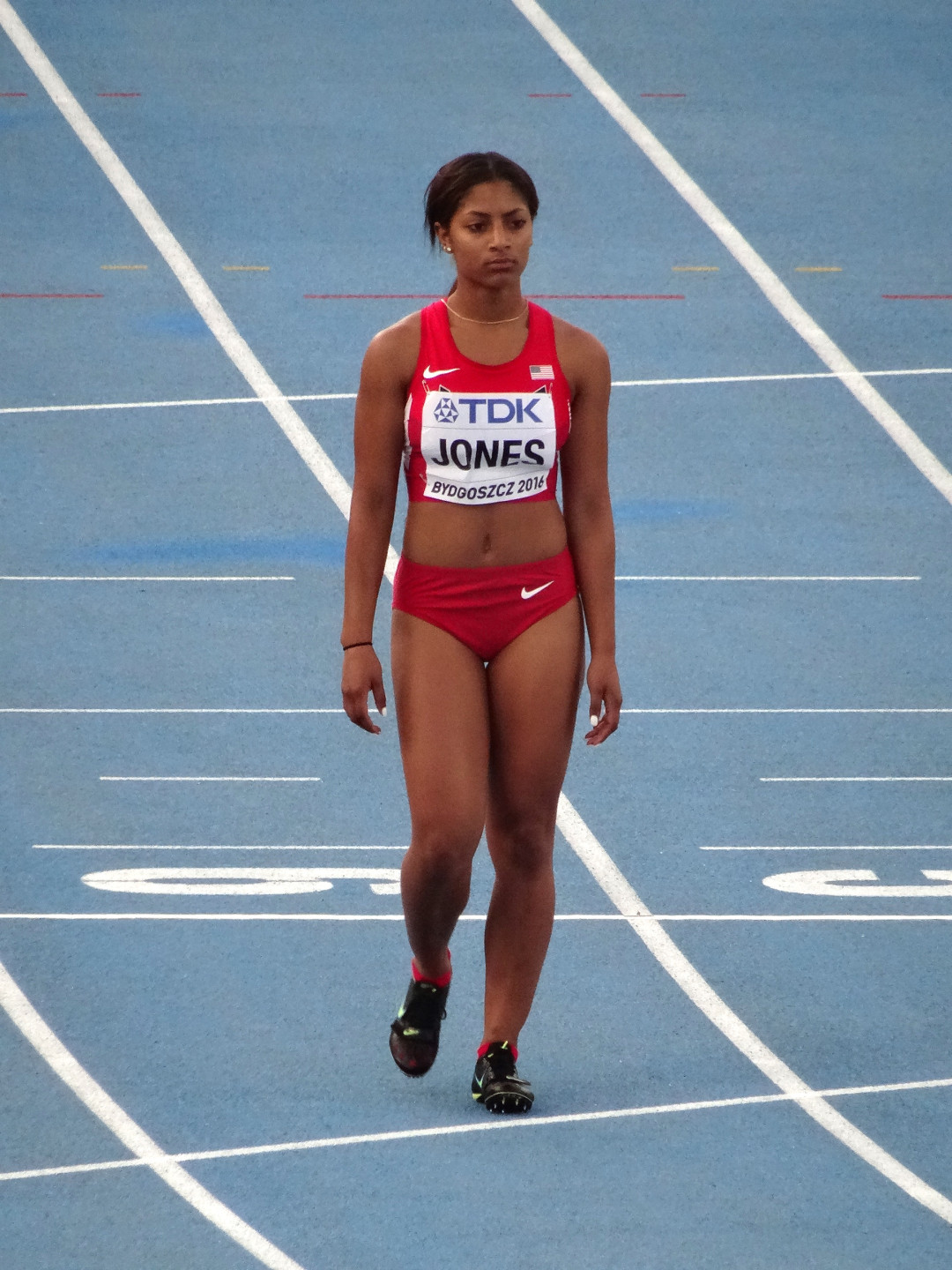
- Tia Jones in 2016

Personal information
- Nationality: American
- Born: September 8, 2000 (age 26)

Sport
- Sport: Track and field
- Event: 100 m hurdles
Medal record
World U20 Championships
Gold medal – first place	2016 Bydgoszcz	4 × 100 m relay
Gold medal – first place	2018 Tampere	100 m hurdles
Bronze medal – third place	2016 Bydgoszcz	100 m hurdles

Tia Jones (born September 8, 2000) is an American track and field athlete who competes in hurdling and sprinting events.

Jones has been named USA Track & Field's Athlete of the Week after winning the 13-14 girl 100 m and 200 m hurdles and setting national and Junior Olympic records in both events at the USATF National Junior Olympic Track & Field Championships on July 28, 2013.

She won the 100-meter hurdles at the 2016 USA Junior Championships in a time of 12.84 seconds, which equaled Aliuska López's world junior record dating from 1987. It was the best ever time set by a 15-year-old athlete.

== Statistics ==
=== Circuit performances ===
Grand Slam Track results
Slam	Race group	Event	Pl.	Time	Prize money
2025 Kingston Slam	Short hurdles	100 m hurdles	1st	12.63	US$50,000
2025 Kingston Slam	Short hurdles	100 m	6th	12.26	US$50,000
2025 Miami Slam	Short hurdles	100 m hurdles	2nd	12.19	US$25,000
2025 Miami Slam	Short hurdles	100 m	6th	11.50	US$25,000
2025 Philadelphia Slam	Short hurdles	100 m hurdles	2nd	12.60	US$30,000
2025 Philadelphia Slam	Short hurdles	100 m	7th	11.66	US$30,000

=== Personal bests ===
Event	Time (sec)	Venue	Date
Outdoor events
100m	11.50	Miramar, Florida	May 2, 2025
200m	23.81	Greensboro, North Carolina	July 25, 2013
100 m hurdles	12.19	Miramar, Florida	May 2, 2025
Indoor events
60 m hurdles	7.67	Albuquerque, New Mexico	February 16, 2024

== Personal life ==
Jones was engaged to NFL wide receiver, Xavier Worthy as announced in January 2025. By March of that year, the engagement appeared to have ended when Jones was granted a temporary restraining order against Worthy. Worthy has sought charges against Jones for theft and assault.
