= Joel Johnson (athlete) =

Bahamian sprinter

Medal record

Athletics

Representing Bahamas

CARIFTA Games Junior (U20)
Gold medal – first place	2018 Nassau	100 m
Silver medal – second place	2018 Nassau	200 m
Silver medal – second place	2019 George Town	4x100 m relay

CARIFTA Games Youth (U17)
Silver medal – second place	2017 Willemstad	200 m
Silver medal – second place	2017 Willemstad	4x100 m relay

Joel Johnson (born September 8, 2000) is a Bahamian sprinter who mainly competes in the 100m and 200m. He broke the Junior National Record for the 100m with a 10.31 (+1.1w) run to win the 2018 CARIFTA Games in front of home crowd. He helped his high school St. Augustine's College win their 28th Track and Field title at the B.A.I.S.S Track and Field Championships. He broke his own Junior National record in 2019 running a time of 10.19 (+0.4)

Johnson is currently serving a four-year competition ban set to end in April 2028 for an anti-doping rule violation after testing positive for stanozolol and methenolone in March 2024.

== Personal bests ==
Event	Time	Venue	Date
100 m	10.19 (+0.4) NJR	Nassau, Bahamas	26 JUL 2019
200 m	(20.87) +0.2	Nassau, Bahamas	17 JUN 2018
