= Heidi Salminen =

Finnish sprinter and hurdler

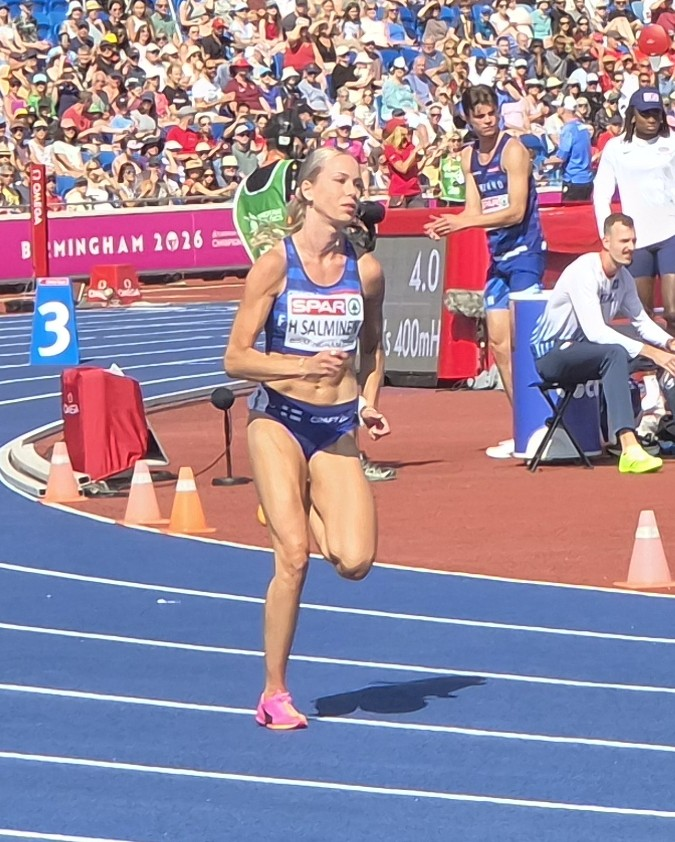
- 2026 European Championships

Personal information
- National team: Finland
- Born: 4 December 2003 (age 22) Jyväskylä, Finland

Sport
- Country: Finland
- Sport: Athletics
- Events: Sprinting; Hurdling
- Club: Jyväskylän Kenttäurheilijat

Achievements and titles
- Personal best: 400m hurdles: 55.27 s (2026)
Medal record
World U20 Championships
Gold medal – first place	2021 Nairobi	400 m hurdles

Heidi Salminen (born 4 December 2003) is a Finnish athlete who specializes in the 400 metres hurdles. In 2021, still 17, she won a gold medal at the World Under 20 Championships as the first Finland's female track medallist ever at such world junior competitions. Heidi improved her pre-championship best by over two seconds, while all four other top women also achieved their lifetime bests.

Her personal best in the 400m hurdles is 56.94 seconds (2021 Nairobi).
