= Amoi Brown =

Jamaican hurdler (born 1999)

Personal information
- Nationality: Jamaican
- Born: 11 January 1999 (age 27)

Sport
- Sport: Athletics
- Event: Hurdles

Achievements and titles
- Personal bests: 60m hurdles: 7.80 (Spanish Town, 2025); 100m hurdles: 12.51 (Bern, 2023)
Medal record
Women's athletics
Representing Jamaica
NACAC Championships
Gold medal – first place	2025 Freeport	100 m hurdles
Carifta Games Junior (U20)
Gold medal – first place	2017 Willemstad	100 m hurdles

Amoi Brown (born 11 January 1999) is a Jamaican hurdler. She won the gold medal at the 2025 NACAC Championships in the 100 metres hurdles.

== Early Life ==
She attended Vere Technical High School. Whilst still a student, she won the U20 100 metres hurdles at the 2017 CARIFTA Games, ahead of compatriot Jeneek Brown and Laëticia Bapté from Martinique. In 2018, she had a personal best of 13.09 seconds for the 100 metres hurdles and was selected for the 2018 World Athletics U20 Championships in Tampere.

== Career ==
She ran a personal best of 12.69 seconds at the Miramar Invitational in Florida, on April 8, 2023. She lowered her personal best to 12.51 seconds for the 100m hurdles at the Citius Meeting in Bern, Switzerland in August 2023. She had a fourth-placed finish in the 100 metres hurdles at the Jamaican National Senior and Junior Championships in 2023.

She ran a personal best of 8.01 seconds for the 60 metres hurdles at the Tyson Invitational in February 2025. On 1 March 2025, she ran 7.80 seconds to win the 60 metres hurdles final at the Jamaican World Athletics Indoor Championships qualifier at GC Foster College in Spanish Town. She was named in the Jamaican team for the 2025 World Athletics Indoor Championships in Nanjing in March 2025, where she qualified for the final of the 60 metres hurdles, placing eighth overall.

She qualified from her 100 metres hurdles semi-final at the 2025 Jamaican Athletics Championships in 12.84 seconds, before placing third in the final in a time of 12.67 seconds. She was named in the Jamaican squad for the 2025 NACAC Championships in Freeport, The Bahamas where she won the gold medal in the 100 metres hurdles in a time of 12.83 seconds. She was a semi-finalist at the 2025 World Athletics Championships in Tokyo, Japan.
