= Emily Newnham =

British athlete (born 2004)

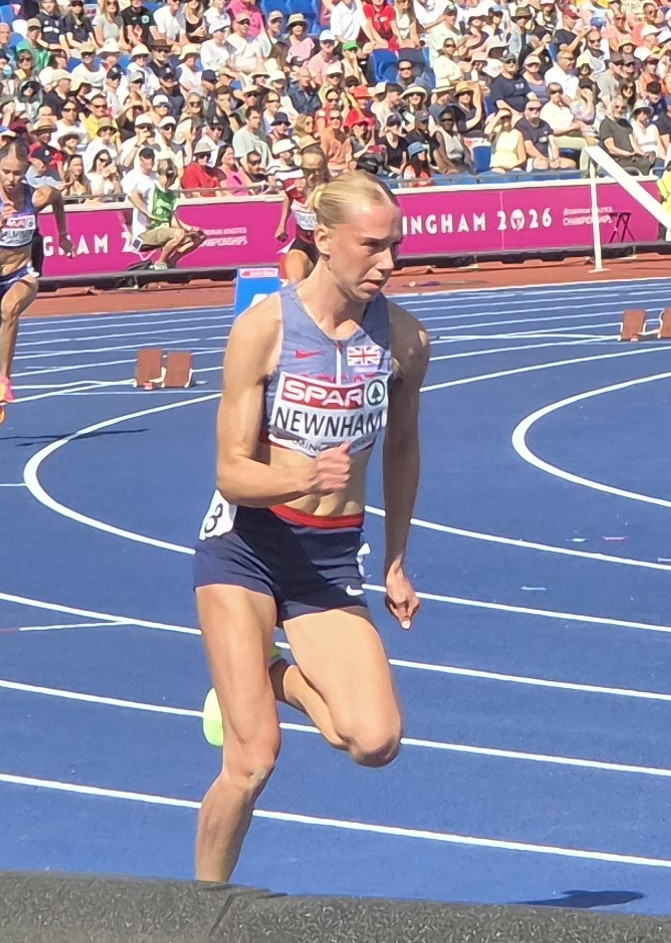
- 2026 European Championships

Personal information
- Nationality: British (English)
- Born: 19 May 2004 (age 22)

Sport
- Sport: Athletics
- Event: Hurdles
- Club: Shaftesbury Barnet Harriers

Achievements and titles
- Personal bests: 400 m: 50.32 (London, 2026); 400 m hurdles: 53.33 (Birmingham, 2026)
Medal record
Women's athletics
Representing Great Britain
European Championships
Silver medal – second place	2026 Birmingham	400 m hurdles
Silver medal – second place	2026 Birmingham	4 × 400 m relay
European Indoor Championships
Silver medal – second place	2025 Apeldoorn	4 × 400 m relay
Bronze medal – third place	2025 Apeldoorn	4 × 400 m mixed
European U23 Championships
Gold medal – first place	2025 Bergen	400 m hurdles
Gold medal – first place	2025 Bergen	4 × 400 m relay
Representing England
Commonwealth Games
Silver medal – second place	2026 Glasgow	400 m hurdles

Emily Newnham (born 19 May 2004) is a British sprinter and hurdler. She won the 400 metres hurdles at the 2026 UK Athletics Championships and the silver medals at both the 2026 Commonwealth Games and 2026 European Championships. Her personal best time is second on the UK all-time list, behind only Sally Gunnell.

== Biography ==
She was English Schools Champion over 400 metres hurdles in 2020, Running a time of 59.22 seconds in Manchester.

=== 2023 ===
She won the British Universities and College (BUCS) indoors 400 metres title in February 2023.

She won the British U20 400 m hurdles title in Chelmsford in June 2023 with a time of 58.54 seconds. She was a bronze medalist in the 400 m hurdles at the 2023 British Athletics Championships in Manchester in 2023, running a 57.13 personal best. She finished fourth in the 400 m hurdles at the 2023 European Athletics U20 Championships in Jerusalem.

She made her Diamond League debut at the 2023 Weltklasse Zürich on 31 August 2023.

=== 2024 ===
In February 2024, she won the British Universities and College (BUCS) indoors 400 m in a championship record time of to 53.06.

In April 2024, she was selected as part of the British team for the 2024 World Athletics Relays in Nassau, Bahamas. She ran in the final of the event as the British 4 × 400 m team finished fourth overall. She was selected to run the 4 × 400 metres for Britain at the 2024 European Athletics Championships in Rome.

In November 2024, she was named by British Athletics on the Olympic Futures Programme for 2025.

=== 2025 ===
She ran an indoors personal best of 52.16 seconds to finish third in the 400 metres at the 2025 British Indoor Athletics Championships in Birmingham, on 23 February 2025. She was selected for the British 4 × 400 m relay team for the 2025 European Athletics Indoor Championships in Apeldoorn, winning a bronze medal in the mixed 4 × 400 m relay. She won a silver medal in the women's 4 × 400 metres relay alongside Lina Nielsen, Amber Anning and Hannah Kelly, with the quartet setting a new national record of three minutes, 24.89 seconds.

She was named in the British team for the 2025 World Athletics Relays in Guangzhou in May 2025. She ran in the mixed 4 × 400 metres relay, alongside Josh Faulds, Sam Lunt and Nicole Yeargin as the British quartet won their heat to qualify for the final and secure a place for Britain at the 2025 World Championships. On the second day of the competition she ran in the Women's 4 × 400 metres relay and also helped the British team qualify in that event. Later that month, she lowered her personal best to 51.45 for the 400 metres and also ran a 400 m hurdles personal best of 55.20, whilst competing in Brussels. In June 2025, she ran a 54.49 400 m hurdles race in Geneva. She was selected for the 400 metres at the 2025 European Athletics Team Championships, where she ran a personal best 50.84 seconds on 28 June 2025. The following day, she also competed in the mixed 4 × 400 metres, in which Britain finished in third place, in the same time as the second-placed Italian team.

She won the gold medal in the 400 metres hurdles in a championship record and personal best time of 54.08 seconds to win by over a second from the rest of the field at the 2025 European Athletics U23 Championships in Bergen, Norway on 19 July 2025. Her time was also just 0.05 away from former Olympic champion Sally Gunnell’s British U23 record. Later in the championships, she ran as part of the gold medal-winning British 4 × 400 metres relay team.

She was runner-up to Lina Nielsen at the 2025 UK Athletics Championships on 3 August 2025 in Birmingham. She was a semi-finalist in the women's 400 metres hurdles at the 2025 World Athletics Championships in Tokyo, Japan, in September 2025. She also finished fifth overall with the British team in the mixed 4 × 400 metres relay.

=== 2026 ===
Newnham was named in the British squad for the 4 × 400 metres relay at the 2026 World Athletics Relays in Gaborone, Botswana. On the opening day she ran as part of the British women's 4 × 400 m team as they qualified for the final in 3:21.28, the fourth fastest recorded time by a British quartet. Newnham ran 55.46 seconds for second place in the women's 400 m hurdles at the Irena Szewińska Memorial in Bydgoszcz, Poland on 29 May. In June, she won over 400 metres hurdles at the Josef Odložil Memorial in Prague. That month, she on the 400 metres hurdles title at the 2026 UK Championships in 54.50 seconds ahead of Hayley McLean and Arabella Wilson. Competing at the 2026 London Athletics Meet on 18 July, she improved her 400 metres personal best and to 50.32 seconds.

Newnham was selected to represent England at the 2026 Commonwealth Games in Glasgow, winning the silver medal in the 400 metres hurdles final on 31 July 2026. On 13 August, she also won the silver medal in the 400 m hurdles at the 2026 European Championships in Birmingham, with her time in the final of 53.33 second to finish runner-up to Emma Zapletalová of Slovakia, moving her to second on the UK all-time list behind only Sally Gunnell. On the final day of the championships she won the silver medal in the women's 4 × 400 metres relay, running the anchor leg as the team finished 0.58 seconds behind a Dutch quartet led home by Femke Broeders-Bol, with Newnham's running her leg with a split time of 49.58 seconds.

== Personal life ==
She is from Kent. She is a student at Loughborough University.

== Athletics achievements ==
=== Personal bests ===
Type	Distance	Time (s)	Wind (m/s)	Venue	Date	Notes
Individual events
Indoor	300 metres sh	36.88	—N/a	Birmingham, United Kingdom	15 February 2025	
Indoor	400 metres sh	52.16	—N/a	Birmingham, United Kingdom	23 February 2025	
Outdoor	200 metres	22.73	+1.8	London, United Kingdom	17 August 2025	
Outdoor	400 metres	50.32	—N/a	London, United Kingdom	18 July 2026	
Outdoor	400 metres hurdles	53.33	—N/a	Birmingham, United Kingdom	12 August 2026	
Team events
Indoor	4 × 400 metres relay sh	3:24.89	—N/a	Apeldoorn, Netherlands	9 March 2025	NR
Indoor	4 × 400 metres relay mixed sh	3:16.49	—N/a	Apeldoorn, Netherlands	6 March 2025	
Outdoor	4 × 400 metres relay	3:21.28	—N/a	Gaborone, Botswana	2 May 2026	
Outdoor	4 × 400 metres relay mixed	3:09.66	—N/a	Madrid, Spain	29 June 2025	

=== International competitions ===
Representing Great Britain & England
Year	Competition	Venue	Position	Event	Notes
2023	European U20 Championships	Jerusalem, Israel	4th	400 m hurdles	57.02
2024	European Championships	Rome, Italy	5th	4 × 400 m relay	3:13.97
2025	European Indoor Championships	Apeldoorn, Netherlands	3rd	Mixed 4 × 400 m relay	3:16.49
2025	European Indoor Championships	Apeldoorn, Netherlands	2nd	4 × 400 m relay	3:24.89
2025	European U23 Championships	Bergen, Norway	1st	400 m hurdles	54.08
2025	European U23 Championships	Bergen, Norway	1st	4 × 400 m relay	3:26.52
2025	World Championships	Tokyo, Japan	5th	Mixed 4 × 400 m relay	3:10.84
2025	World Championships	Tokyo, Japan	16th (sf)	400 m hurdles	54.64
2026	Commonwealth Games	Glasgow, United Kingdom	2nd	400 m hurdles	54.04
2026	European Championships	Birmingham, United Kingdom	2nd	400 m hurdles	53.33
2026	European Championships	Birmingham, United Kingdom	2nd	4 × 400 m relay	3:21.68

=== National championships and competitions ===
Year	Competition	Venue	Position	Event	Time
2019	England Championships, U17 events	Bedford	5th	300 m	40.54
2021	England Championships, U20 events	Bedford	1st	400 m hurdles	1:00.18
2021	British Championships	Manchester	14th (h)	400 m hurdles	1:01.92
2022	England Indoor Championships, U20 events	Sheffield	1st	400 m	54.75
2022	British Indoor Championships	Birmingham	16th (sf)	400 m	55.09
2022	England Championships, U20 events	Bedford	1st	400 m hurdles	59.47
2023	British Indoor Championships	Birmingham	10th (sf)	400 m	54.71
2023	England Championships, U20 events	Chelmsford	1st	400 m hurdles	57.54
2023	British Championships	Manchester	3rd	400 m hurdles	57.13
2024	British Indoor Championships	Birmingham	9th (sf)	400 m	54.21
2025	British Indoor Championships	Birmingham	4th	400 m	52.16
2025	British Championships	Birmingham	2nd	400 m hurdles	55.64
2026	British Championships	Birmingham	1st	400 m hurdles	54.50
