= 2017 IAAF World U18 Championships =

2017 World U18 Championships in Athletics
- Host city: Nairobi, Kenya
- Events: 40
- Dates: 12–16 July
- Main venue: Moi International Sports Centre

The 2017 IAAF World U18 Championships was the tenth and last edition of the biennial international athletics competition for youth (under-18) athletes. The five-day competition took place between 12 and 16 July at the Moi International Sports Centre in Nairobi, Kenya. Eligible athletes were aged 16 or 17 on 31 December 2017 (born in 2000 or 2001).

South Africa topped the medals table with 11 medals, five of them gold, while host nation Kenya finished fourth with four gold and 15 medals in total.

== Boycott ==
The United States, Great Britain, Australia, New Zealand, Canada, Japan, South Korea and Italy decided not to take part in the championships for organizational, logistical, and health and safety reasons (concerning athletes still underage).

== Medal summary ==
=== Boys ===
Event	Gold		Silver		Bronze	
100 metres	Tshenolo Lemao; South Africa	10.57	Retshidisitswe Mlenga; South Africa	10.61	Tyreke Wilson; Jamaica	10.65
200 metres	Retshidisitswe Mlenga; South Africa	21.03	Tshenolo Lemao; South Africa	21.12; PB	Luis Brander; Germany	21.23; PB
400 metres	Antonio Watson; Jamaica	46.59; PB	Daniel Williams; Guyana	46.72; PB	Colby Jennings; Turks and Caicos Islands	46.77; NR
800 metres	Melese Nberet; Ethiopia	1:47.12; WU18L	Tolesa Bodena; Ethiopia	1:47.16; PB	Japhet Kibiwott Toroitich; Kenya	1:47.82; PB
1500 metres	George Manangoi; Kenya	3:47.53	Abebe Dessassa; Ethiopia	3:48.65; PB	Belete Mekonen; Ethiopia	3:50.64
3000 metres	Selemon Barega; Ethiopia	7:47.16; PB	Edward Zakayo; Kenya	7:49.17; PB	Stanley Mburu; Kenya	7:50.64; PB
110 metres hurdles	De'Jour Russell; Jamaica	13.04; CR	Lu Hao-hua; Chinese Taipei	13.41	Thomas Wanaverbecq; France	13.55
400 metres hurdles	Sokwakhana Zazini; South Africa	49.27	Moitalel Naadokila; Kenya	52.06; PB	Baptiste Christophe; France	52.21; PB
2000 metres steeplechase	Leonard Bett; Kenya	5:32.52	Cleophas Meyan; Kenya	5:33.07; PB	Alemu Kitessa; Ethiopia	5:42.10
10,000 metres walk	Zhang Yao; China	41:12.01; WU18L	Salavat Ilkaev; Independent Athletes	41:24.17; PB	Dominic Ndingiti; Kenya	41:25.78; PB
High jump	Breyton Poole; South Africa	2.24; WU18L	Chima Ihenetu; Germany	2.14; PB	Vladyslav Lavskyy; Ukraine	2.11; PB
Pole vault	Matthias Orban; France	5.00	Christos Tamanis; Cyprus	4.85; PB	Illya Kravchenko; Ukraine	4.70; PB
Long jump	Maikel Vidal; Cuba	7.88; WU18L	Lester Lescay; Cuba	7.79; PB	Andreas Samuel Bucsa; Romania	7.47
Triple jump	Jordan Díaz; Cuba	17.30; WU18B	Frixon Chila; Ecuador	15.92; PB	Arnovis Dalmero; Colombia	15.89; PB
Shot put	Timo Northoff; Germany	20.72; WU18L	Mikhail Samuseu; Belarus	19.99	Jonathan de Lacey Lacey; South Africa	19.93; PB
Discus throw	Claudio Romero; Chile	64.33; WU18L	Oleksiy Kyrylin; Ukraine	63.98; PB	Morne Brandon; South Africa	58.34
Hammer throw	Mykhaylo Kokhan; Ukraine	82.31	Damneet Singh; India	74.20; PB	Raphael Winkelvoss; Germany	71.78
Javelin throw	Liu Zhekai; China	77.54; PB	Johannes Schlebusch; South Africa	75.68; PB	Song Qingshu; China	73.64
Decathlon	Steven Fauvel-Clinch; France	7559; WU18L	Olegs Kozakovs; Latvia	7377; PB	Leo Neugebauer; Germany	7204

=== Girls ===
Event	Gold		Silver		Bronze	
100 metres	Mizgin Ay; Turkey	11.62	Magdalena Stefanowicz; Poland	11.62; PB	Kevona Davis; Jamaica	11.67
200 metres	Talea Prepens; Germany	23.51; PB	Jaël Bestué; Spain	23.61; PB	Mizgin Ay; Turkey	23.76; PB
400 metres	Barbora Malíková; Czech Republic	52.74; PB	Mary Moraa; Kenya	53.31; PB	Giovana Rosália dos Santos; Brazil	53.57; PB
800 metres	Jackline Wambui; Kenya	2:01.46; WU18L	Lydia Jeruto Lagat; Kenya	2:02.06; PB	Hirut Meshesha; Ethiopia	2:06.32
1500 metres	Lemlem Hailu; Ethiopia	4:20.80	Sindu Girma; Ethiopia	4:22.14	Edina Jebitok; Kenya	4:23.16
3000 metres	Abersh Minsewo; Ethiopia	9:24.62	Emmaculate Chepkirui; Kenya	9:24.69	Yitayish Mekonene; Ethiopia	9:28.46
100 metres hurdles	Britany Anderson; Jamaica	12.72	Cyrena Samba-Mayela; France	12.80	Daszay Freeman; Jamaica	13.09
400 metres hurdles	Zeney van der Walt; South Africa	58.23	Sanique Walker; Jamaica	58.27	Gisèle Wender; Germany	59.17; PB
2000 metres steeplechase	Caren Chebet; Kenya	6:24.80; WU18L	Mercy Chepkurui; Kenya	6:26.10; PB	Etalemahu Sintayehu; Ethiopia	6:35.79
5000 metres walk	Glenda Morejón; Ecuador	22:32.30	Meryem Bekmez; Turkey	22:32.79	Elvira Khasanova; Independent Athletes	22:35.72
High jump	Yaroslava Mahuchikh; Ukraine	1.92; CR	Martyna Lewandowska; Poland	1.82	Lavinja Jürgens; Germany	1.79; SB
Pole vault	Niu Chunge; China	4.20; PB	Leni Freyja Wildgrube; Germany	4.15; PB	Anna Airault; France	4.10; PB
Long jump	Gong Luying; China	6.37; PB	Lea-Sophie Klik; Germany	6.30	Diane Mouillac; France	6.28; PB
Triple jump	Tan Qiujiao; China	13.64; WU18L	Aleksandra Nacheva; Bulgaria	13.54; PB	Zulia Hernández; Cuba	13.29; PB
Shot put	Selina Dantzler; Germany	17.64	Yu Tianxiao; China	17.62; PB	Yue Sun; China	17.59; PB
Discus throw	Silinda Morales; Cuba	52.89	Leia Braunagel; Germany	51.29	Liu Quantong; China	50.10
Hammer throw	Amanda Almendáriz; Cuba	71.12; WU18L	Yaritza Martínez; Cuba	69.75	Katsiaryna Valadkevich; Belarus	68.17
Javelin throw	Marisleisys Duarthe; Cuba	62.92; CR	Qing Cai; China	57.01	Dai Qianqian; China	54.96
Heptathlon	María Vicente; Spain	5612	Johanna Seibler; Germany	5602	Urtė Bačianskaitė; Lithuania	5467

=== Mixed ===
Event	Gold		Silver		Bronze	
4 x 400 metres relay	Brazil; Bruno Benedito da Silva; Giovana Rosália dos Santos; Jéssica Moreira; Alison dos Santos	3:21.71	Jamaica; Shaquena Foote; Anthony Cox; Sanique Walker; Antonio Watson; Joanne Reid*; Tyrese Reid*	3:22.23	South Africa; Gontse Morake; Retshidisitswe Mlenga; Zeney van der Walt; Sokwakhana Zazini	3:24.45

* Medalists who participated in heats only.

== Medal table ==
Host nation

Rank	Nation	Gold	Silver	Bronze	Total
1	South Africa (RSA)	5	3	3	11
2	China (CHN)	5	2	4	11
3	Cuba (CUB)	5	2	1	8
4	Kenya (KEN)*	4	7	4	15
5	Ethiopia (ETH)	4	3	5	12
6	Germany (GER)	3	5	5	13
7	Jamaica (JAM)	3	2	3	8
8	France (FRA)	2	1	4	7
9	Ukraine (UKR)	2	1	2	5
10	Turkey (TUR)	1	1	1	3
11	Ecuador (ECU)	1	1	0	2
11	Spain (ESP)	1	1	0	2
13	Brazil (BRA)	1	0	1	2
14	Chile (CHI)	1	0	0	1
14	Czech Republic (CZE)	1	0	0	1
16	Poland (POL)	0	2	0	2
17	Belarus (BLR)	0	1	1	2
–	Independent Athletes^{[1]}	0	1	1	2
18	Bulgaria (BUL)	0	1	0	1
18	Chinese Taipei (TPE)	0	1	0	1
18	Cyprus (CYP)	0	1	0	1
18	Guyana (GUY)	0	1	0	1
18	India (IND)	0	1	0	1
18	Latvia (LAT)	0	1	0	1
24	Colombia (COL)	0	0	1	1
24	Lithuania (LTU)	0	0	1	1
24	Romania (ROU)	0	0	1	1
24	Turks and Caicos Islands (TCA)	0	0	1	1
Totals (27 entries)		39	39	39	117

Notes

^[1] Independent Athletes were not included in the official medal table.

== See also ==
- 2017 Asian Youth Championships in Athletics
- 2017 African Youth Championships in Athletics
