= 2021 NACAC U23 Championships in Athletics – Results =

These are the results of the 2021 NACAC U23 Championships in Athletics which took place on July 9, 10, and 11, at the Estadio Nacional in San José, Costa Rica.

== Men's results ==
=== 100 meters ===
Heats – July 9
Wind:
Heat 1: +0.6 m/s, Heat 2: +4.1 m/s

| Rank | Heat | Name | Nationality | Time | Notes |
|---|---|---|---|---|---|
| 1 | 2 | Kuron Griffith | Barbados | 10.34 | Q |
| 2 | 2 | Odaine McPherson | Jamaica | 10.39 | Q |
| 3 | 2 | Guinove Joanus | Haiti | 10.40 | Q |
| 4 | 1 | Kion Benjamin | Trinidad and Tobago | 10.53 | Q |
| 5 | 2 | Ian Liburd Jr. | Saint Kitts and Nevis | 10.64 | q |
| 6 | 1 | Matthew Clarke | Barbados | 10.65 | Q |
| 7 | 2 | Tyrell Edwards | Trinidad and Tobago | 10.68 | q |
| 8 | 2 | Timothy Powell | Costa Rica | 11.02 | |
| 9 | 1 | Isaac Benjamin Joseph | Haiti | 11.03 | Q |
| 10 | 1 | Luis Alonso Guevara | Costa Rica | 11.20 | |

Final – July 9

Wind: +0.2 m/s

| Rank | Lane | Name | Nationality | Time | Notes |
|---|---|---|---|---|---|
| 1st place, gold medalist(s) | 4 | Kuron Griffith | Barbados | 10.33 | |
| 2nd place, silver medalist(s) | 5 | Odaine McPherson | Jamaica | 10.39 | |
| 3rd place, bronze medalist(s) | 6 | Kion Benjamin | Trinidad and Tobago | 10.40 | |
| 4 | 7 | Matthew Clarke | Barbados | 10.55 | |
| 5 | 1 | Tyrell Edwards | Trinidad and Tobago | 10.56 | |
| 6 | 3 | Guinove Joanus | Haiti | 10.59 | |
| 7 | 2 | Ian Liburd Jr. | Saint Kitts and Nevis | 10.80 | |
| 8 | 8 | Isaac Benjamin Joseph | Haiti | 10.91 | |

=== 200 meters ===
Heats – July 10
Wind:
Heat 1: -0.6 m/s, Heat 2: -0.2 m/s

| Rank | Heat | Name | Nationality | Time | Notes |
|---|---|---|---|---|---|
| 1 | 2 | Alexander Ogando | Dominican Republic | 20.79 | Q |
| 2 | 1 | Jevaughn Powell | Jamaica | 21.35 | Q |
| 3 | 1 | Antonio Watson | Jamaica | 21.51 | Q |
| 4 | 1 | Guinove Joanus | Haiti | 21.61 | Q |
| 5 | 2 | Darion Skerrit | Antigua and Barbuda | 21.64 | Q |
| 6 | 1 | Ian Liburd Jr. | Saint Kitts and Nevis | 21.82 | q |
| 7 | 2 | Matthew Clarke | Barbados | 21.92 | Q |
| 8 | 2 | Isaac Benjamin Joseph | Haiti | 22.22 | q |
| 9 | 1 | Karim Murray | Cayman Islands | 22.33 | |
| 10 | 2 | Kluiverth Núñez | Costa Rica | 22.95 | |

Final – July 11

Wind: -1.7 m/s

| Rank | Lane | Name | Nationality | Time | Notes |
|---|---|---|---|---|---|
| 1st place, gold medalist(s) | 4 | Alexander Ogando | Dominican Republic | 20.59 | |
| 2nd place, silver medalist(s) | 5 | Jevaughn Powell | Jamaica | 20.83 | |
| 3rd place, bronze medalist(s) | 3 | Antonio Watson | Jamaica | 21.03 | |
| 4 | 2 | Matthew Clarke | Barbados | 21.16 | |
| 5 | 7 | Darion Skerrit | Antigua and Barbuda | 21.57 | |
| 6 | 6 | Guinove Joanus | Haiti | 21.58 | |
| 7 | 8 | Ian Liburd Jr. | Saint Kitts and Nevis | 21.94 | |
| 8 | 1 | Isaac Benjamin Joseph | Haiti | 22.69 | |

=== 400 meters ===
July 10

| Rank | Lane | Name | Nationality | Time | Notes |
|---|---|---|---|---|---|
| 1st place, gold medalist(s) | 5 | Jonathan Jones | Barbados | 46.20 | |
| 2nd place, silver medalist(s) | 4 | Christopher Taylor | Jamaica | 46.58 | |
| 3rd place, bronze medalist(s) | 3 | Javeir Brown | Jamaica | 47.54 | |
| 4 | 7 | Antonio Grant | Panama | 48.90 | |
| 5 | 1 | Leroy Chapman | Saint Kitts and Nevis | 50.12 | |
| 6 | 2 | Derick Leandro | Costa Rica | 50.84 | |
| | 6 | Wilbert Encarnación | Dominican Republic | DNS | |

=== 800 meters ===
July 10

| Rank | Name | Nationality | Time | Notes |
|---|---|---|---|---|
| 1st place, gold medalist(s) | Juan Diego Castro | Costa Rica | 1:48.66 | |
| 2nd place, silver medalist(s) | Tyrese Reid | Jamaica | 1:49.44 | |
| 3rd place, bronze medalist(s) | Aaron Hernández | El Salvador | 1:54.47 | |
| 4 | Jorge Prendas | Costa Rica | 1:54.49 | |
| 5 | Marcos Cruz | Guatemala | 1:56.53 | |

=== 1500 meters ===
July 11

| Rank | Name | Nationality | Time | Notes |
|---|---|---|---|---|
| 1st place, gold medalist(s) | Aaron Hernández | El Salvador | 3:57.37 | |
| 2nd place, silver medalist(s) | Marcos Cruz | Guatemala | 3:58.27 | |
| 3rd place, bronze medalist(s) | Tyrese Reid | Jamaica | 4:01.40 | |
| 4 | Jorge Prendas | Costa Rica | 4:02.14 | |
| 5 | Allan Rodríguez | Costa Rica | 4:08.61 | |
| 6 | Keveroy Venson | Jamaica | 4:30.27 | |

=== 5000 meters ===
July 9

| Rank | Name | Nationality | Time | Notes |
|---|---|---|---|---|
| 1st place, gold medalist(s) | Marcial Rodríguez | Nicaragua | 14:32.93 | |

=== 110 meters hurdles ===
July 10
Wind: -1.5 m/s

| Rank | Lane | Name | Nationality | Time | Notes |
|---|---|---|---|---|---|
| 1st place, gold medalist(s) | 6 | Orlando Bennett | Jamaica | 13.65 | |
| 2nd place, silver medalist(s) | 7 | Rasheem Brown | Cayman Islands | 14.06 | |
| 3rd place, bronze medalist(s) | 5 | Yves Cherubin | Haiti | 14.29 | |
| 4 | 8 | Jordani Woodley | Jamaica | 14.86 | |

=== 400 meters hurdles ===
July 9

| Rank | Lane | Name | Nationality | Time | Notes |
|---|---|---|---|---|---|
| 1st place, gold medalist(s) | 4 | Rasheeme Griffith | Barbados | 52.06 | |
| 2nd place, silver medalist(s) | 5 | Nathan Fergusson | Barbados | 52.69 | |
| 3rd place, bronze medalist(s) | 3 | Luis Alonso Guevara | Costa Rica | 54.78 | |

=== 3000 meters steeplechase ===
July 11

| Rank | Name | Nationality | Time | Notes |
|---|---|---|---|---|
| 1st place, gold medalist(s) | Marcial Rodríguez | Nicaragua | 9:56.16 | |
| 2nd place, silver medalist(s) | Brandon Barrantes | Costa Rica | 10:07.86 | |
| | Carlos Santos | El Salvador | DNF | |

=== 4 × 100 meters relay ===
July 10

| Rank | Lane | Nation | Competitors | Time | Notes |
|---|---|---|---|---|---|
| 1st place, gold medalist(s) | 3 | Jamaica | Antonio Watson, Christopher Taylor, Jevaughn Powell, Odaine McPherson | 42.07 | |
| 2nd place, silver medalist(s) | 4 | Costa Rica | Derick Leandro, Ivan Sibaja, Kluiverth Núñez, Rasheed Miller | 44.69 | |

=== 10,000 meters walk ===
July 10

| Rank | Name | Nationality | Time | Notes |
|---|---|---|---|---|
| 1st place, gold medalist(s) | Pedro Alexander López | Guatemala | 43:55.84 | |
| 2nd place, silver medalist(s) | Oscar Pop | Guatemala | 44:08.08 | |
| 3rd place, bronze medalist(s) | Juan Manuel Calderón | Costa Rica | 44:12.97 | |
| | Yeudy Bonilla | Costa Rica | DQ | |

=== High jump ===
July 11

| Rank | Name | Nationality | 1.85 | 1.90 | 1.95 | 2.00 | 2.05 | 2.10 | 2.15 | 2.21 | 2.25 | Result | Notes |
|---|---|---|---|---|---|---|---|---|---|---|---|---|---|
| 1st place, gold medalist(s) | Shaun Miller | Bahamas | – | – | – | o | o | o | xo | o | xxx | 2.21 | |
| 2nd place, silver medalist(s) | Kyle Alcine | Bahamas | – | – | – | o | o | o | o | xxx | | 2.15 | |
| 3rd place, bronze medalist(s) | Byron Villalobos | Costa Rica | o | o | o | xxx | | | | | | 1.95 | |
| 3rd place, bronze medalist(s) | Raymond Richards | Jamaica | – | – | o | xx– | x | | | | | 1.95 | |
| 5 | Víctor Saavedra | Costa Rica | o | xo | xxx | | | | | | 1.90 | | |

=== Pole vault ===
July 11

| Rank | Name | Nationality | 4.20 | 4.35 | 4.50 | 4.60 | Result | Notes |
|---|---|---|---|---|---|---|---|---|
| 1st place, gold medalist(s) | Julio Flores | Nicaragua | – | o | xxo | xxx | 4.50 | |
| 2nd place, silver medalist(s) | Héctor Juan | Dominican Republic | xxo | – | xxx | | 4.20 | |

=== Long jump ===
July 11

| Rank | Name | Nationality | #1 | #2 | #3 | #4 | #5 | #6 | Result | Notes |
|---|---|---|---|---|---|---|---|---|---|---|
| 1st place, gold medalist(s) | Shakwon Coke | Jamaica | 7.82 | 6.62 | x | x | 7.88 | x | 7.88 | |
| 2nd place, silver medalist(s) | Clement Campbell | Trinidad and Tobago | 6.94 | 5.43 | 6.74 | 7.31 | x | 7.37 | 7.37 | |
| 3rd place, bronze medalist(s) | Rasheed Miller | Costa Rica | 7.15 | x | x | x | 7.08 | x | 7.15 | |
| 4 | Taeco O'Garro | Antigua and Barbuda | 6.88 | 6.65 | x | 7.01 | 6.98 | 6.86 | 7.01 | |
| | Adrián Alvarado | Panama | x | r | | | | | NM | |

=== Triple jump ===
July 9

| Rank | Name | Nationality | #1 | #2 | #3 | #4 | #5 | #6 | Result | Notes |
|---|---|---|---|---|---|---|---|---|---|---|
| 1st place, gold medalist(s) | Jonathan Miller | Barbados | 15.89 | 16.00 | x | x | – | – | 16.00 | |
| 2nd place, silver medalist(s) | Taeco O'Garro | Antigua and Barbuda | 15.34 | 15.41 | 15.33 | 15.24 | 14.49 | x | 15.41 | |
| 3rd place, bronze medalist(s) | Jadon Brome | Barbados | x | x | 14.69 | 15.12 | – | x | 15.12 | |
| | Owayne Owens | Jamaica | x | x | x | r | | | NM | |

=== Shot put ===
July 9

| Rank | Name | Nationality | #1 | #2 | #3 | #4 | #5 | #6 | Result | Notes |
|---|---|---|---|---|---|---|---|---|---|---|
| 1st place, gold medalist(s) | Courtney Lawrence | Jamaica | 16.60 | 18.02 | 18.66 | 18.37 | x | 18.27 | 18.66 | |
| 2nd place, silver medalist(s) | Elías Gómez | Costa Rica | 13.17 | 13.19 | 13.44 | x | x | x | 13.44 | |

=== Discus throw ===
July 9

| Rank | Name | Nationality | #1 | #2 | #3 | #4 | #5 | #6 | Result | Notes |
|---|---|---|---|---|---|---|---|---|---|---|
| 1st place, gold medalist(s) | Kai Chang | Jamaica | x | x | 59.69 | 61.39 | 60.90 | x | 61.39 | |
| 2nd place, silver medalist(s) | Roje Stona | Jamaica | 60.01 | 61.21 | 59.86 | 59.66 | 56.70 | x | 61.21 | |
| 3rd place, bronze medalist(s) | Elías Gómez | Costa Rica | 41.30 | 43.50 | 46.33 | x | 44.80 | 44.23 | 46.33 | |

=== Hammer throw ===
July 10

| Rank | Name | Nationality | #1 | #2 | #3 | #4 | #5 | #6 | Result | Notes |
|---|---|---|---|---|---|---|---|---|---|---|
| 1st place, gold medalist(s) | Dylan Suárez | Costa Rica | 58.83 | x | 60.81 | 61.14 | 58.69 | x | 61.14 | |
| 2nd place, silver medalist(s) | Rodrigo Morán | Guatemala | 51.73 | 52.66 | 53.04 | 52.75 | 52.34 | x | 53.04 | |

=== Javelin throw ===
July 10

| Rank | Name | Nationality | #1 | #2 | #3 | #4 | #5 | #6 | Result | Notes |
|---|---|---|---|---|---|---|---|---|---|---|
| 1st place, gold medalist(s) | Tyriq Horsford | Trinidad and Tobago | 68.01 | 69.18 | x | 68.58 | 73.06 | x | 73.06 | |
| 2nd place, silver medalist(s) | Keyshawn Strachan | Bahamas | 67.81 | 72.13 | 65.67 | – | 67.99 | 71.41 | 72.13 | |
| 3rd place, bronze medalist(s) | Armando Caballero | Panama | 56.26 | 58.20 | 63.50 | 61.75 | 59.40 | 56.28 | 63.50 | |
| 4 | Iván Sibaja | Costa Rica | x | 63.04 | 60.99 | 60.18 | 62.01 | 58.31 | 63.04 | |

=== Decathlon ===
July 9–10

The highest mark recorded in each event is highlighted in yellow

| Rank | Name | Nationality | 100m | LJ | SP | HJ | 400m | 110m H | DT | PV | JT | 1500m | Points | Notes |
|---|---|---|---|---|---|---|---|---|---|---|---|---|---|---|
| 1st place, gold medalist(s) | Esteban Ibáñez | El Salvador | 11.33w | 6.78 | 9.80 | 1.95 | 50.86 | 15.55 | 28.94 | 3.90 | 41.50 | 4:53.75 | 6436 | |
| 2nd place, silver medalist(s) | Brainer Chavarría | Costa Rica | 11.43w | 5.86 | 10.06 | 1.56 | 53.21 | 17.61 | 31.89 | 2.90 | 40.31 | 5:24.61 | 6436 | |

== Women's results ==
=== 100 meters ===
July 9
Wind: +0.6 m/s

| Rank | Lane | Name | Nationality | Time | Notes |
|---|---|---|---|---|---|
| 1st place, gold medalist(s) | 5 | Halle Hazzard | Grenada | 11.42 | |
| 2nd place, silver medalist(s) | 3 | Amya Clarke | Saint Kitts and Nevis | 11.90 | |
| 3rd place, bronze medalist(s) | 2 | Denisha Cartwritght | Bahamas | 11.91 | |
| | 4 | Ashanti Moore | Jamaica | DQ | FS |

=== 200 meters ===
July 11
Wind: -1.6 m/s

| Rank | Lane | Name | Nationality | Time | Notes |
|---|---|---|---|---|---|
| 1st place, gold medalist(s) | 5 | Fiordaliza Cofil | Dominican Republic | 23.89 | |
| 2nd place, silver medalist(s) | 4 | Halle Hazzard | Grenada | 24.07 | |
| 3rd place, bronze medalist(s) | 7 | Iantha Wright | Trinidad and Tobago | 24.40 | |
| 4 | 6 | Grizell Scarlett | Jamaica | 24.45 | |
| | 8 | Angeline Pondler | Costa Rica | DNF | |

=== 400 meters ===
July 10

| Rank | Lane | Name | Nationality | Time | Notes |
|---|---|---|---|---|---|
| 1st place, gold medalist(s) | 4 | Charokee Young | Jamaica | 52.06 | |
| 2nd place, silver medalist(s) | 3 | Shafiqua Maloney | Saint Vincent and the Grenadines | 52.73 | |
| 3rd place, bronze medalist(s) | 5 | Fiordaliza Cofil | Dominican Republic | 53.83 | |
| 4 | 8 | Shalysa Wray | Cayman Islands | 54.42 | |
| 5 | 6 | Tamara Woodley | Saint Vincent and the Grenadines | 56.76 | |
| 6 | 1 | Angeline Pondler | Costa Rica | 57.18 | |
| | 2 | Milagros Duran | Dominican Republic | DNS | |
| | 7 | Lilian Reyes | Dominican Republic | DNS | |

=== 800 meters ===
July 10

| Rank | Name | Nationality | Time | Notes |
|---|---|---|---|---|
| 1st place, gold medalist(s) | Shafiqua Maloney | Saint Vincent and the Grenadines | 2:08.13 | |
| 2nd place, silver medalist(s) | Mikaela Smith | United States Virgin Islands | 2:19.87 | |

=== 100 meters hurdles ===
July 10
Wind: -2.6 m/s

| Rank | Lane | Name | Nationality | Time | Notes |
|---|---|---|---|---|---|
| 1st place, gold medalist(s) | 4 | Daszay Freeman | Jamaica | 13.80 | |
| 2nd place, silver medalist(s) | 6 | Charisma Taylor | Bahamas | 13.88 | |
| 3rd place, bronze medalist(s) | 3 | Sasha Wells | Bahamas | 13.94 | |
| 4 | 5 | Hannah Connell | Barbados | 14.08 | |
| 5 | 2 | Mariel Brokke | Costa Rica | 15.41 | |

=== 400 meters hurdles ===
July 9

| Rank | Lane | Name | Nationality | Time | Notes |
|---|---|---|---|---|---|
| 1st place, gold medalist(s) | 7 | Shiann Salmon | Jamaica | 58.29 | |

=== 5000 meters walk ===
July 10

| Rank | Name | Nationality | Time | Notes |
|---|---|---|---|---|
| 1st place, gold medalist(s) | Yasury Palacios | Guatemala | 22:31.13 | NU23R |
| | María Fernanda Peinado | Guatemala | DQ | |

=== High jump ===
July 9

| Rank | Name | Nationality | 1.65 | 1.70 | 1.75 | 1.80 | 1.85 | 1.90 | Result | Notes |
|---|---|---|---|---|---|---|---|---|---|---|
| 1st place, gold medalist(s) | Lamara Distin | Jamaica | – | o | o | xo | o | xxx | 1.85 | |
| 2nd place, silver medalist(s) | Ángela González | Panama | xxo | xxx | | | | | 1.65 | |

=== Triple jump ===
July 11

| Rank | Name | Nationality | #1 | #2 | #3 | #4 | #5 | #6 | Result | Notes |
|---|---|---|---|---|---|---|---|---|---|---|
| 1st place, gold medalist(s) | Charisma Taylor | Bahamas | 13.22 | x | 13.04 | – | 13.02 | x | 13.22 | |
| 2nd place, silver medalist(s) | Mikeisha Welcome | Saint Vincent and the Grenadines | 13.16 | 13.13 | x | 12.88 | 12.94 | 13.10 | 13.16 | |

=== Shot put ===
July 9

| Rank | Name | Nationality | #1 | #2 | #3 | #4 | #5 | #6 | Result | Notes |
|---|---|---|---|---|---|---|---|---|---|---|
| 1st place, gold medalist(s) | Deisheline Mayers | Costa Rica | 14.90 | 13.18 | 14.05 | 14.24 | 13.79 | 13.65 | 14.90 | NR |
| 2nd place, silver medalist(s) | Danielle Sloley | Jamaica | 13.34 | 13.35 | 12.96 | 13.42 | 13.82 | 13.85 | 13.85 | |
| 3rd place, bronze medalist(s) | Lacee Barnes | Cayman Islands | 11.84 | 12.58 | 13.32 | 13.75 | x | 13.16 | 13.75 | |

=== Discus throw ===
July 9

| Rank | Name | Nationality | #1 | #2 | #3 | #4 | #5 | #6 | Result | Notes |
|---|---|---|---|---|---|---|---|---|---|---|
| 1st place, gold medalist(s) | Lacee Barnes | Cayman Islands | 38.78 | 42.76 | 44.95 | 40.56 | 47.34 | x | 47.34 | |
| 2nd place, silver medalist(s) | Acacia Astwood | Bahamas | x | 28.33 | 34.34 | 35.85 | 36.78 | x | 36.78 | |
| 3rd place, bronze medalist(s) | Tania Sevilla | Costa Rica | x | 33.16 | 33.32 | 29.26 | 31.73 | x | 33.32 | |

=== Hammer throw ===
July 10

| Rank | Name | Nationality | #1 | #2 | #3 | #4 | #5 | #6 | Result | Notes |
|---|---|---|---|---|---|---|---|---|---|---|
| 1st place, gold medalist(s) | Acacia Astwood | Bahamas | 50.07 | 47.39 | x | x | 51.22 | x | 51.22 | |
| 2nd place, silver medalist(s) | Lindsay Reyes | Costa Rica | x | 39.99 | 44.53 | 45.62 | x | 42.48 | 45.62 | |

=== Javelin throw ===
July 11

| Rank | Name | Nationality | #1 | #2 | #3 | #4 | #5 | #6 | Result | Notes |
|---|---|---|---|---|---|---|---|---|---|---|
| 1st place, gold medalist(s) | Deisheline Mayers | Costa Rica | 37.95 | 41.98 | 36.08 | x | 39.68 | 36.26 | 41.98 | |

=== Heptathlon ===
July 9–10

| Rank | Name | Nationality | 100m H | HJ | SP | 200m | LJ | JT | 800m | Points | Notes |
|---|---|---|---|---|---|---|---|---|---|---|---|
| 1st place, gold medalist(s) | Mariel Brokke | Costa Rica | 15.08 | 1.49 | 7.64 | 26.33 | 5.12 | 19.79 | 2:39.50 | 4042 | |

== Mixed results ==
=== 4 × 100 meters relay ===
July 11

| Rank | Nation | Competitors | Time | Notes |
|---|---|---|---|---|
| 1st place, gold medalist(s) | Jamaica | Shiann Salmon (W), Christopher Taylor (M), Odaine McPherson (M), Charokee Young (W) | 3:20.71 | |
| 2nd place, silver medalist(s) | Bahamas | Sasha Wells (W), Shaun Miller (M), Charisma Taylor (W), Kyle Alcine (M) | 3:41.69 | |
