= NACAC U20 Championships in Athletics =

NACAC U20 Athletics Championships

The NACAC U20 Championships in Athletics is an bi-annual championships to athletes under-20 years of age in the year of competition held between the member associations of the North American, Central American and Caribbean Athletic Association (NACAC). The inaugural edition took place in 2021 in San José, Costa Rica.

== Editions ==
	Year	City	Country	Date	Venue	No. of Events	No. of Athletes
1st	2021	Costa Rica	Costa Rica	9–11 July	Estadio Nacional	25	

== Championships records ==
=== Men ===
Event	Record	Athlete	Nationality	Date	Meet	Place	Ref.
100 m	10.47 (−0.3 m/s)	Terrence Jones	Bahamas	9 July 2021	2021 Championships	San José, Costa Rica	
200 m	21.17 (−2.3 m/s)	Wayna McCoy	Bahamas	11 July 2021	2021 Championships	San José, Costa Rica	
400 m	48.34	Wayna McCoy	Bahamas	10 July 2021	2021 Championships	San José, Costa Rica	
800 m	1:49.75	Handal Roban	Saint Vincent and the Grenadines	10 July 2021	2021 Championships	San José, Costa Rica	
110 m hurdles (0.99 cm)	14.27 (−1.5 m/s)	Antoine Andrews	Bahamas	10 July 2021	2021 Championships	San José, Costa Rica	
400 m hurdles (0.91 cm)	53.45	Dillon Leacock	Trinidad and Tobago	9 July 2021	2021 Championships	San José, Costa Rica	
High jump	2.10 m	Romaine Beckford	Jamaica	11 July 2021	2021 Championships	San José, Costa Rica	
Long jump	7.80 m (−1.2 m/s)	Kavian Kerr	Jamaica	11 July 2021	2021 Championships	San José, Costa Rica	
Triple jump	14.92 m (+0.2 m/s)	Nathan Crawford	Barbados	9 July 2021	2021 Championships	San José, Costa Rica	
Shot put (6 kg)	15.93 m	Tarajah Hudson	Bahamas	9 July 2021	2021 Championships	San José, Costa Rica	
Discus throw (1.75 kg)	52.45 m	Tarajah Hudson	Bahamas	9 July 2021	2021 Championships	San José, Costa Rica	
4 × 100 m relay	41.68	Antoine Andrews; Wayna Mccoy; Demetrius Rolle; Terrence Jones	Bahamas	10 July 2021	2021 Championships	San José, Costa Rica	
4 × 400 m relay	3:26.91	Gary Altamirano; Matthew Cook; Alejandro Ricketts; José Andrés Hernández	Costa Rica	11 July 2021	2021 Championships	San José, Costa Rica	

=== Women ===
Event	Record	Athlete	Nationality	Date	Meet	Place	Ref.
100 m	11.36 (+0.8 m/s)	Camille Rutherford	Bahamas	9 July 2021	2021 Championships	San José, Costa Rica	
200 m	23.42 (+0.4 m/s)	Camille Rutherford	Bahamas	11 July 2021	2021 Championships	San José, Costa Rica	
400 m	54.85	Rae-Anne Serville	Trinidad and Tobago	10 July 2021	2021 Championships	San José, Costa Rica	
800 m	2:15.25	Jasmaine Knowles	Bahamas	10 July 2021	2021 Championships	San José, Costa Rica	
100 m hurdles (0.84 cm)	13.64 (−2.2 m/s)	Ackera Nuget	Jamaica	10 July 2021	2021 Championships	San José, Costa Rica	
High jump	1.65 m	María José Rodríguez Luna	Costa Rica	9 July 2021	2021 Championships	San José, Costa Rica	
Long jump	6.07 m (+0.9 m/s)	Shantae Foreman	Jamaica	10 July 2021	2021 Championships	San José, Costa Rica	
Triple jump	10.72 m (+0.1 m/s)	Maryangel Morales	Costa Rica	9 July 2021	2021 Championships	San José, Costa Rica	
Shot put	12.56 m	Carnitre Mackey	Bahamas	9 July 2021	2021 Championships	San José, Costa Rica	
Javelin throw (600 g)	55.06 m	Rhema Otabor	Bahamas	11 July 2021	2021 Championships	San José, Costa Rica	
4 × 100 m relay	49.81	Luisana Alonso; Melanie Vargas; Ivanniz Blackwood; Maryangel Morales	Costa Rica	10 July 2021	2021 Championships	San José, Costa Rica	
4 × 400 m relay	4:08.66	Luisana Alonso; Maryangel Morales; Melanie Vargas; Ivanniz Blackwood	Costa Rica	11 July 2021	2021 Championships	San José, Costa Rica	
