= 2022 World Athletics U20 Championships – Men's 4 × 100 metres relay =

Men's 4 × 100 metres relay at the 2022 World Athletics U20 Championships
- Venue: Estadio Olímpico Pascual Guerrero
- Dates: 4 August (round 1); 5 August (final)
- Competitors: 28 from 18 nations
- Winning time: 39.35

Medalists
gold medal	Kowa Ikeshita; Hiroto Fujiwara; Shunki Tateno; Hiroki Yanagita	Japan
silver medal	Bouwahjgie Nkrumie; Bryan Levell; Mark-Anthony Daley; Adrian Kerr; David Lynch	Jamaica
bronze medal	Laurenz Colbert; Michael Gizzi; Brandon Miller; Johnny Brackins; David Foster 'Charlie Bartholomiew	United States

The men's 4 × 100 metres relay at the 2022 World Athletics U20 Championships was held at the Estadio Olímpico Pascual Guerrero in Cali, Colombia on 4 and 5 August 2022.

25 national teams entered to the competition, with each team having a minimum of 4 and maximum of 6 athletes.

== Records ==
U20 standing records prior to the 2022 World Athletics U20 Championships were as follows:

Record	Nation	Mark	Location	Date
World U20 Record	South Africa	38.51	Nairobi, Kenya	22 August 2021
Championship Record	South Africa	38.51	Nairobi, Kenya	22 August 2021
World U20 Leading	United States	38.72	Walnut, United States	16 April 2022

== Teams ==
The 25 national teams entered a total of 136 athletes, Each team selected 4 athletes from their list in each round, however, the team selected for the round 1 could be made up of athletes entered by the nation in other events.

- Australia:
  - Connor Bond
  - Jai Gordon
  - Lachlan Kennedy
  - Calab Law
  - Aidan Murphy
  - Ryan Tarrant
- Bahamas:
  - Antoine Andrews
  - Carlos Brown Jr.
  - Zion Campbell
  - Zachary Evans
  - Wanya McCoy
- Botswana:
  - Abofelo Leitseng
  - Godiraone Lobatlamang
  - Mooketsi Luzani
  - Thuso Omphile
  - Lundi Pinaemang
  - Letsile Tebogo
- Brazil:
  - Izaias Alves
  - Renan Correa
  - Lucas Gabriel Fernandes
  - Matheus Lima
  - Thamer Moreira
- Canada:
  - Tyler Floyd
  - Desmond Fraser
  - Daniel Kidd
  - Christopher Morales-Williams
  - Nate Paris
  - Alomd Small
- Colombia:
  - Óscar Baltán
  - Carlos Flórez
  - Yerlin González
  - Ronal Longa
  - Brayan Ramos
  - Javier Robledo
- Spain:
  - Juan Carlos Castillo
  - Mario Mena
  - Jaime Mendoza
  - Álvaro Rodríguez
  - Alejandro Rueda
  - Jaime Sancho
- Finland:
  - Juho Alasaari
  - Topi Huttunen
  - Niko Kangasoja
  - Joonas Lapinkero
  - Valtteri Louko
  - Rasmus Martin
- France:
  - Grégory Afoy
  - Hugo Cerra
  - Jeff Erius
  - Dejan Ottou
  - Loukas Rangasamy
- Great Britain:
  - Emmanuel Duruiheoma
  - Olutimilehin Esan
  - Medwin Odamtten
  - Michael Onilogbo
  - Tyler Panton
  - Jeriel Quainoo
- Germany:
  - Bela Djalo Corca
  - Ole Ehrhardt
  - Heiko Gussmann
  - Vincent Herbst
  - Tobias Morawietz
  - Chidiera Onuoha
- Italy:
  - Alessio Faggin
  - Eduardo Longobardi
  - Alessandro Malvezzi
  - Samuele Rignanese
  - Loris Tonella
- Jamaica:
  - Mark-Anthony Daley
  - Sandrey Davison
  - Adrian Kerr
  - Dishaun Lamb
  - David Lynch
  - Bouwahjgie Nkrumie
- Japan:
  - Tatsuki Abe
  - Hiroto Fujiwara
  - Kowa Ikeshita
  - Ryona Manago
  - Shunji Tateno
  - Hiroki Yanagita
- Netherlands:
  - Maurice Afognon
  - Nsikak Ekpo
  - Jamie Sesay
  - Matthew Sophia
  - Daniljo Vriendwijk
- Nigeria:
  - Kayinsola Ajayi
  - Raphael Egbuchilem
  - Adekalu Fakorede
  - Ogheneovo Mabilo
  - Nurain Musa
  - Godson Oghenebrume
- Peru:
  - Luis Angulo
  - Ismael Arévalo
  - Rodrigo Cornejo
  - Aron Eart
- Poland:
  - Michał Gorzkowicz
  - Dawid Grząka
  - Hubert Kozelan
  - Damian Soból
  - Marek Zakrzewski
- Saint Kitts and Nevis:
  - K'Anthony Benjamin
  - Shamarie Newton-Roberts
  - Aldrett Nisbett
  - William Sharpe
  - Akadianto Willett
- Saudi Arabia:
  - Hassan Al-Absi
  - Mohammed Khaled Al-Khalidi
  - Ali Abdullah Al Tawfeeq
  - Sultan Kaabi
  - Hattan Majrashi
- South Africa:
  - Letlhogonolo Moleyane
  - Bradley Nkoana
  - Bradley Oliphant
  - Benjamin Richardson
  - Mukhethwa Tshifura
- Switzerland:
  - Nicolas Bersier
  - Mathieu Chèvre
  - Gaspar Martinez-Aldama
  - Matthieu Normand
  - Giovanni Pirolli
  - Jérémy Valnet
- Thailand:
  - Puripool Boonson
  - Thawatchai Himaiad
  - Natawat Imaudom
  - Muhamad Salaeh
  - Watchapol Thanthong
- Trinidad and Tobago:
  - Devin Augustine
  - Jaden De Souza
  - Anthony Diaz
  - Shakeem Mc Kay
  - Elijah Simmons
  - Revell Webster
- United States:
  - Laurenz Colbert
  - David Foster
  - Michael Gizzi
  - Brandon Miller

== Results ==
=== Round 1 ===
The round 1 took place on 4 August, with the 25 teams involved being split into 4 heats, 1 heat of 7 athletes and 3 heats of 6. The first team in each heat ( Q ) and the next 4 fastest ( q ) qualified to the final. The overall results were as follows:

Rank	Heat	Athletes	Nationality	Time	Note
1	3	Kowa Ikeshita, Hiroto Fujiwara, Shunki Tateno, Hiroki Yanagita	Japan	39.12	Q SB
2	3	Bouwahjgie Nkrumie, Adrian Kerr, Mark-Anthony Daley, David Lynch	Jamaica	39.24	q
3	2	Adekalu Fakorede, Ogheneovo Mabilo, Kayinsola Ajayi, Nurain Musa	Nigeria	39.41	Q SB
4	1	Emel Keyser, Letlhogonolo Moleyane, Bradley Oliphant, Mukhethwa Tshifura	South Africa	39.50	Q SB
5	1	Eduardo Longobardi, Loris Tonella, Alessandro Malvezzi, Alessio Faggin	Italy	39.63	q SB
6	4	Johnny Brackins, Michael Gizzi, David Foster, Charlie Bartholomew	United States	39.78	Q SB
7	2	Jaime Mendoza, Mario Mena, Juan Carlos Castillo, Alejandro Rueda	Spain	39.79	q
8	2	Matthew Sophia, Maurice Afognon, Nsikak Ekpo, Daniljo Vriendwijk	Netherlands	39.85	q =NU20R
9	4	Topi Huttunen, Valtteri Louko, Niko Kangasoja, Rasmus Martin	Finland	40.04	NU20R
10	1	Antoine Andrews, Wanya McCoy, Carlos Brown Jr., Zachary Evans	Bahamas	40.09	SB
11	1	Lucas Gabriel Fernandes, Izaias Alves, Thamer Moreira, Renan Correa	Brazil	40.24	SB
12	2	Desmond Fraser, Nate Paris, Daniel Kidd, Carter Birade	Canada	40.59	SB
13	4	Jaden De Souza, Shakeem Mc Kay, Elijah Simmons, Revell Webster	Trinidad and Tobago	40.77	SB
14	1	Hassan Al-Absi, Hattan Majrashi, Ali Abdullah Al Tawfeeq, Mohammed Khaled Al-Khalidi	Saudi Arabia	40.86	SB
15	3	Rodrigo Cornejo, Ismael Arévalo, Aron Eart, Luis Angulo	Peru	40.96	NU20R
16	1	Aldrett Nisbett, K'Anthony Benjamin, William Sharpe, Shamarie Newton-Roberts	Saint Kitts and Nevis	41.23	SB
17	3	Watchapol Thanthong, Natawat Imaudom, Thawatchai Himaiad, Puripool Boonson	Thailand	42.09	SB
	3	Heiko Gussmann, Tobias Morawietz, Eddie Reddemann, Chidiera Onuoha	Germany	DNF	
	4	Lachlan Kennedy, Connor Bond, Ryan Tarrant, Aidan Murphy	Australia	DNF	
	2	Olutimilehin Esan, Medwin Odamtten, Tyler Panton, Michael Onilogbo	Great Britain	DNF	
	2	Giovanni Pirolli, Jérémy Valnet, Nathan Oberti, Mathieu Chèvre	Switzerland	DNF	
	3	Abofelo Leitseng, Lundi Pinaemang, Godiraone Lobatlamang, Thuso Omphile	Botswana	DQ	
	4	Carlos Flórez, Óscar Baltán, Yerlin González, Ronal Longa	Colombia	DQ	
	4	Hugo Cerra, Jeff Erius, Dejan Ottou, Grégory Afoy	France	DQ	
	1	Damian Soból, Dawid Grząka, Michał Gorzkowicz, Hubert Kozelan	Poland	DQ	

=== Final ===
The final (originally set for 18:00) was started at 19:09 on 5 August. The results were as follows:

Rank	Lane	Athletes	Nation	Time	Notes
1st place, gold medalist(s)	3	Kowa Ikeshita, Hiroto Fujiwara, Shunki Tateno, Hiroki Yanagita	Japan	39.35	
2nd place, silver medalist(s)	8	Bouwahjgie Nkrumie, Bryan Levell, Mark-Anthony Daley, Adrian Kerr	Jamaica	39.35	
3rd place, bronze medalist(s)	5	Laurenz Colbert, Michael Gizzi, Brandon Miller, Johnny Brackins	United States	39.57	SB
4	7	Eduardo Longobardi, Loris Tonella, Alessandro Malvezzi, Alessio Faggin	Italy	39.77	
5	6	Adekalu Fakorede, Ogheneovo Mabilo, Kayinsola Ajayi, Nurain Musa	Nigeria	39.78	
6	1	Jaime Mendoza, Mario Mena, Juan Carlos Castillo, Alejandro Rueda	Spain	39.87	
7	2	Matthew Sophia, Maurice Afognon, Nsikak Ekpo, Daniljo Vriendwijk	Netherlands	39.90	
	4	Mukhethwa Tshifura, Letlhogonolo Moleyane, Bradley Oliphant, Banjamin Richardson	South Africa	DQ TR17.4.3	
