= Rojé Stona =

Jamaican athlete (born 1999)

Roje Stona OLY
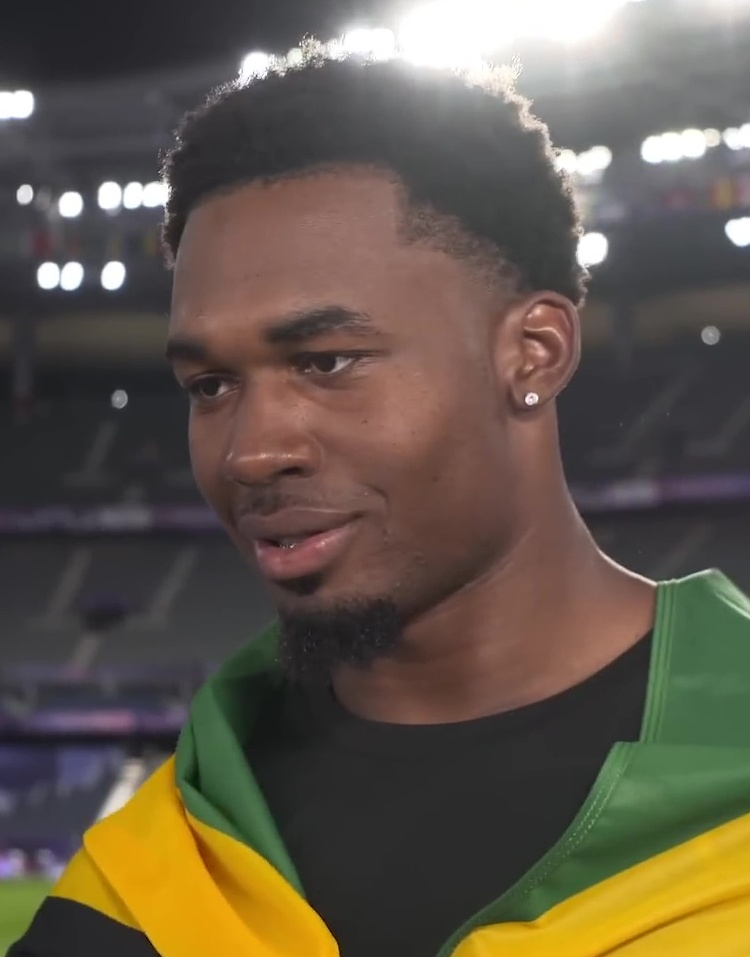
- Stona at the 2024 Paris Olympics

Personal information
- Nationality: Jamaica
- Born: 26 February 1999 (age 27) Montego Bay, Jamaica
- Height: 2 m (6 ft 7 in)

Sport
- Country: Jamaica
- Sport: Track and field
- Event: Discus
- College team: Arkansas Razorbacks; Clemson Tigers
- Coached by: Ryan Crouser; Shawn Cobey

Achievements and titles
- Personal bests: Discus: 70.66 m (Ramona, 2026); Shot put: 20.48 m (Boston, 2024)
Medal record
Men's athletics
Representing Jamaica
Olympic Games
Gold medal – first place	2024 Paris	Discus throw
Diamond League
Third place	2025 Zurich	Discus Throw
Third place	2026 Brussels	Discus Throw
NACAC U23 Championships
Gold medal – first place	2019 Querétaro	Discus
Silver medal – second place	2021 San José	Discus
Carifta Games U20
Gold medal – first place	2018 Nassau	Discus

Rojé Stona (born 26 February 1999) is a track and field athlete who competes in the discus throw. Representing Jamaica, he broke the Olympic record in the men's discus throw event to win the gold medal at the 2024 Paris Olympics.

== Early life ==
He started his secondary school throwing career at Rusea's High School in Hanover, where he won the Class Two boys discus at the Western Championships in 2014. He then attended St. Jago High School in Spanish Town, Jamaica. He also attended Clemson University, where in 2022 he earned his bachelor’s degree in industrial engineering, and the University of Arkansas.

=== Athletics Career ===
He won gold in the discus at the 2019 NACAC U23 Championships in Mexico. He won silver in the discus at the 2021 NACAC U23 Championships in Costa Rica behind compatriot Kai Chang.

== 2022 ==
He qualified for the final of the discus at the 2022 Commonwealth Games in Birmingham, finishing sixth overall.

== 2023 ==
He competed in the men's discus at the 2023 World Athletics Championships in Budapest and threw 62.57 metres. He was runner-up to Turner Washington in the discus at the 2023 NCAA Division I Indoor Track and Field Championships in Austin, Texas in June 2023.

== 2024 ==
In April 2024, Stona achieved the qualifying mark for the discus at the 2024 Summer Olympics in finishing second at the Oklahoma Throws Series World Invitational, with a personal best distance of 69.05m. He then won the discus throw at the LA Grand Prix in May 2024 with a throw of 66.93 metres. In July 2024, he was officially selected for the Jamaican team at the 2024 Summer Olympics.

In the Paris 2024 Olympics, Stona clinched the gold medal in the men's discus throw. He set a new personal best and an Olympic record with a throw of 70.00 meters in the 4th round, surpassing silver medalist Mykolas Alekna, who had broken his father Virgilijus Alekna's 20-year Olympic record just minutes earlier with a throw of 69.97 meters. This victory was the first Olympic gold medal for Jamaica in a throwing event, and the second Olympic medal overall, after Rajindra Campbell's bronze in the shot put event three days before. It was also Jamaica's only gold medal at the Paris 2024 Olympics.

== 2025 ==
He competed in Stockholm at the 2025 BAUHAUS-galan event, part of the 2025 Diamond League, in June 2025 placing sixth overall. He placed third at the Diamond League Final in Zurich on 28 August.

In June 2025, it was announced that Stona was switching allegiance from Jamaica to Turkey, alongside fellow athlete Rajindra Campbell. As a result, both athletes did not compete at the 2025 World Athletics Championships. Önder Özbilen, the team coordinator for Turkey's Olympic athletics team, confirmed the decision in March 2026. The applications were declined by World Athletics in April 2026 as "inconsistent with the core principles of the regulations".

== 2026 ==
On 9 April 2026, he threw a new discus personal best of 70.66 metres in Ramona, Oklahoma. On 4 July, Stona threw 67.42m for a third place finish at the 2026 Prefontaine Classic. At the 2026 Diamond League Final in Brussels on 4 September, Stona was third in the discus throw.

=== NFL ===
In May 2024, he was invited to rookie minicamps by the NFL teams Green Bay Packers and New Orleans Saints. 6'6" and 270 pounds, he did not play American football competitively at college. In December 2024, he was announced as joining the NFL's International Player Pathway scheme.

== International competitions ==
Representing Jamaica
Year	Competition	Venue	Position	Event	Notes
2016	CARIFTA Games (U17)	St. George's, Grenada	2nd	Discus throw (1.5 kg)	53.12 m
2016	World U20 Championships	Bydgoszcz, Poland	33rd (q)	Discus throw (1.75 kg)	62.67 m
2017	CARIFTA Games (U20)	Willemstad, Curaçao	1st	Discus throw (1.75 kg)	66.41 m
2017	Pan American U20 Championships	Trujillo, Peru	4th	Discus throw (1.75 kg)	58.63 m
2018	CARIFTA Games (U20)	Nassau, Bahamas	1st	Discus throw (1.75 kg)	63.77 m
2019	NACAC U23 Championships	Querétaro City, Mexico	1st	Discus throw	56.97 m
2021	NACAC U23 Championships	San José, Costa Rica	2nd	Discus throw	61.21 m
2022	Commonwealth Games	Birmingham, United Kingdom	6th	Discus throw	62.15 m
2023	World Championships	Budapest, Hungary	19th (q)	Discus throw	62.67 m
2024	Olympic Games	Paris, France	1st	Discus throw	70.00 m (PB)(OR)
