= 2019 European Athletics U23 Championships – Men's discus throw =

The men's discus throw event at the 2019 European Athletics U23 Championships will be held in Gävle, Sweden, at Gavlehov Stadium Park on 13 and 14 July.

== Medalists ==
Gold	Silver	Bronze
Kristjan Čeh; Slovenia	Clemens Prüfer; Germany	Oskar Stachnik; Poland

== Results ==
=== Qualification ===
Qualification rule: 58.50 (Q) or the 12 best results (q) qualified for the final.

Rank	Group	Name	Nationality	#1	#2	#3	Results	Notes
1	B	Clemens Prüfer	Germany	49.72	61.20		61.20	Q
2	A	Yauheni Bahutski	Belarus	58.30	x	–	58.30	q
3	A	Kristjan Čeh	Slovenia	57.23	57.49	57.14	57.49	q
4	B	Jakob Gardenkrans	Sweden	56.85	x	54.78	56.85	q
5	A	Tom Reux	France	51.90	56.02	54.36	56.02	q
6	B	Oskar Stachnik	Poland	55.62	55.90	55.14	55.90	q
7	B	Giorgos Koniarakis	Cyprus	55.55	50.11	54.03	55.55	q
8	A	Christophoros Genethli	Cyprus	52.97	55.06	53.43	55.06	q
9	B	Gleb Zhuk	Belarus	48.29	54.32	54.83	54.83	q, SB
10	B	Ivan Povalyashko	Ukraine	52.61	54.26	54.59	54.59	q
11	A	Casper Jørgensen	Denmark	52.88	54.44	51.40	54.44	q
12	A	Adar Sheere	Israel	54.30	53.95	x	54.30	q
13	B	Emanuel Sousa	Portugal	51.30	x	53.84	53.84	
14	B	George Armstrong	Great Britain	x	x	52.45	52.45	
15	B	Alessio Mannucci	Italy	50.71	x	52.08	52.08	
16	A	George Evans	Great Britain	x	51.90	x	51.90	
17	B	Deyan Gemizhev	Bulgaria	51.89	50.73	50.88	51.89	
18	A	Merten Howe	Germany	51.75	x	x	51.75	
19	B	Eoin Sheridan	Ireland	44.79	51.38	x	51.38	
20	B	Ruslan Valitov	Ukraine	49.78	49.67	x	49.78	
21	A	Berke İnaloğlu	Turkey	x	48.46	47.98	48.46	
22	A	Ştefan Mura	Moldova	x	48.16	x	48.16	
	A	Jordan Guehaseim	France	x	x	x	NM	
	A	Voislav Grubiša	Bosnia and Herzegovina	x	x	x	NM	

=== Final ===
Rank	Name	Nationality	#1	#2	#3	#4	#5	#6	Result	Notes
1st place, gold medalist(s)	Kristjan Čeh	Slovenia	61.40	60.19	58.80	x	62.78	63.82	63.82	WU23L, NU23R
2nd place, silver medalist(s)	Clemens Prüfer	Germany	62.15	x	x	60.93	x	61.23	62.15	
3rd place, bronze medalist(s)	Oskar Stachnik	Poland	56.69	57.91	58.71	56.63	56.69	60.01	60.01	
4	Yauheni Bahutski	Belarus	57.29	58.56	x	57.87	x	56.47	58.56	
5	Jakob Gardenkrans	Sweden	54.77	53.98	57.86	x	x	x	57.86	
6	Gleb Zhuk	Belarus	53.62	56.95	x	x	56.39	56.01	56.95	SB
7	Christophoros Genethli	Cyprus	44.72	x	56.56	48.18	x	56.59	56.59	
8	Tom Reux	France	53.34	55.01	54.91	x	x	55.87	55.87	
9	Casper Jørgensen	Denmark	54.74	x	54.26				54.74	
10	Ivan Povalyashko	Ukraine	45.10	53.15	53.73				53.73	
11	Adar Sheere	Israel	50.70	x	53.59				53.59	
12	Giorgos Koniarakis	Cyprus	52.93	50.69	x				52.93	
