= 2016 IAAF World U20 Championships – Men's discus throw =

The men's discus throw event at the 2016 IAAF World U20 Championships was held in Bydgoszcz, Poland, at Zdzisław Krzyszkowiak Stadium on 24 July. A 1.75 kg (junior implement) discus was used.

== Medalists ==
Gold	Mohamed Ibrahim Moaaz; Qatar
Silver	Oskar Stachnik; Poland
Bronze	Hleb Zhuk; Belarus

== Results ==
=== Final ===
24 July

Rank	Name	Nationality	Attempts				Result	Notes
Rank	Name	Nationality	1	2	3	4	Result	Notes
1st place, gold medalist(s)	Mohamed Ibrahim Moaaz	Qatar	63.63	x	x	x	63.63	NU20R
2nd place, silver medalist(s)	Oskar Stachnik	Poland	55.80	60.06	62.83	61.34	62.83	PB
3rd place, bronze medalist(s)	Hleb Zhuk	Belarus	60.44	61.70	61.07	x	61.70	PB
4	Wictor Petersson	Sweden	61.23	x	x	59.55	61.23	PB
~~5~~	Konrad Bukowiecki	Poland	x	~~57.11~~	~~59.71~~	x	~~59.71~~	DQ
5	Clemens Prufer	Germany	x	55.98	59.10	x	59.10	
6	Cheng Yulong	China	x	55.36	58.81		58.81	
7	Shinichi Yukinaga	Japan	56.07	58.50	56.93		58.50	PB
8	Merten Howe	Germany	57.42	x	58.16		58.16	
9	Stefan Mura	Moldova	x	x	57.87		57.87	
10	Cleverson Oliveira	Brazil	57.85	x	x		57.85	
	George Evans	Great Britain	x	x	x		NM	

=== Qualifications ===
24 July
With qualifying standard of 59.00 (Q) or at least the 12 best performers (q) advance to the Final

==== Summary ====
Rank	Name	Nationality	Result	Notes
1	Mohamed Ibrahim Moaaz	Qatar	62.79	Q PB
2	Merten Howe	Germany	62.16	Q
3	Clemens Prüfer	Germany	61.41	Q
~~4~~	Konrad Bukowiecki	Poland	~~60.31~~	DQ
4	Hleb Zhuk	Belarus	59.48	Q PB
5	Oskar Stachnik	Poland	59.25	Q
6	Cheng Yulong	China	59.24	Q PB
7	Stefan Mura	Moldova	59.19	Q
8	Wictor Petersson	Sweden	58.04	q
9	Shinichi Yukinaga	Japan	57.98	q PB
10	George Evans	Great Britain	57.88	q
11	Cleverson Oliveira	Brazil	57.62	q
12	Christoforos Gebethli	Cyprus	57.49	PB
13	José Miguel Ballivian	Chile	57.15	NU20R
14	Jakob Gardenkrans	Sweden	57.14	
15	Josh Boateng	Grenada	57.04	
16	Claudio Romero	Chile	56.37	NU20R
17	José Lorenzo Hernandez	Spain	56.33	
18	Bronson Osborn	United States	56.23	
19	Yume Ando	Japan	55.93	
20	Luis Manuel Ramirez	Spain	55.87	
21	Thomas Mardal	Norway	55.82	
22	Kevin Nedrick	Jamaica	55.78	
23	Jordan Guehaseim	France	55.60	
24	Connor Bandel	United States	54.57	
25	Emrecan Ercan	Turkey	54.53	
26	Hassan Mohamed Elshabrawi	Egypt	54.50	
27	George Armstrong	Great Britain	54.39	
28	Ruslan Valitov	Ukraine	54.36	
29	Sun Shichen	China	54.34	
30	Arijam Islami	Croatia	53.24	
31	Shehab Mohamed Abdalaziz	Egypt	53.19	
32	Jander Heil	Estonia	53.19	
33	Roje Stona	Jamaica	53.12	
34	Bence Halász	Hungary	52.90	
35	Leonardo Fabbri	Italy	52.09	
36	Andréas Thanasis	Greece	52.07	
37	Giorgos Koniarakis	Cyprus	51.70	
38	Nathaniel Sulupo	Samoa	49.27	
39	Adar Shir	Israel	48.95	
40	Ivan Povaliashko	Ukraine	48.86	
41	Sven Todorovic	Croatia	45.38	
42	James Kimiora Harry	Cook Islands	38.51	NU20R
	Wout Zijlstra	Netherlands	NM	
	Temuri Abulashvili	Georgia	NM	
