= Odaine McPherson =

Jamaican athlete (born 1999)

Personal information
- Born: 14 February 1999 (age 27)

Sport
- Sport: Athletics
- Event: Sprint
- Club: Sprintec

Achievements and titles
- Personal bests: 60 metres: 6.53 (2026); 100 meters: 10.06 (2025); 200 meters: 20.84 (2024)
Medal record
Men's athletics
Representing Jamaica
NACAC U23 Championships
Gold medal – first place	2021 San José	4x100 m relay
Gold medal – first place	2021 San José	4x400 m mixed
Silver medal – second place	2021 San José	100 m

Odaine McPherson (born 14 February 1999) is a Jamaican sprinter. He represented Jamaica at the 2023 Pan American Games, having previously been a triple medalist at the 2021 NACAC Under-23 Championships in Athletics.

== Biography ==
McPherson won the silver medal in the 100 meters at the 2021 NACAC U23 Championships in San Jose, Costa Rica, finishing behind Barbadian Kuron Griffith but ahead of Kion Benjamin of Trinidad and Tobago. At that championships, he also he won the gold medal in the mixed 4 x 400 metres relay alongside Shiann Salmon, Christian Taylor and Charokee Young. He was also a gold medalist in the men's 4 x 100 metres alongside Taylor, Antonio Watson and Jevaughn Powell, at the championships.

McPherson qualified for the final of the 100 metres at the 2023 Pan American Games, in Santiago, Chile, placing seventh overall. He also ran in the 4 x 100 metres at the championships, placing sixth. McPherson was selected for the Jamaican relay pool for the 2024 World Athletics Relays in The Bahamas. He also competed in Jamaican 4 x 100 metres relay teams the following year seeking to gain a time qualification for the nation ahead of the 2025 World Championships in Tokyo.

Competing over 100 metres, McPherson completed back-to-back wins in Sweden in July 2025, before also winning in Portugal, and recording a personal best time of 10.06 seconds (+1.1 m/s) for the 100 metres in Germany the following month.

McPherson was runner-up to Kishane Thompson, but ahead of Bryan Levell, in 6.53 seconds for the 60 metres at the Puma JAAA Fuller-Anderson Development Meet at the GC Foster College on 17 January 2026. The following month, he ran 6.56 seconds in Karlsruhe, Germany and 6.59 seconds (+1.4) outdoors at the 2026 Gibson McCook Relays in Kingston, Jamaica. He was named in the Jamaica squad for the 2026 World Athletics Relays in Gaborone, Botswana, running on the opening day in the men's 4 x 100 metres alongside Rohan Watson, Adrian Kerr, and Rasheed Foster.

== Personal life ==
McPherson attended Greater Portmore High School in Portmore, in the Saint Catherine Parish of Jamaica.
