= 2018 IAAF World U20 Championships – Men's discus throw =

Men's discus throw at the 2018 World U20 Championships
- Venue: Ratina Stadium
- Dates: 14 July (qualification); 15 July (final)
- Competitors: 34 from 28 nations
- Winning distance: 62.36 m

Medalists
gold medal	Kai Chang	Jamaica
silver medal	Yauheni Bahutski	Belarus
bronze medal	Claudio Romero	Chile

The men's discus throw at the 2018 IAAF World U20 Championships was held at Ratina Stadium on 14 and 15 July.

== Records ==
Standing records prior to the 2018 IAAF World U20 Championships in Athletics
World U20 Record	Mykyta Nesterenko (UKR)	70.13	Halle, Germany	24 May 2008
Championship Record	Margus Hunt (EST)	67.32	Beijing, China	16 August 2006
World U20 Leading	Moaaz Mohamed Ibrahim (QAT)	66.47	Cape Town, South Africa	3 February 2018

== Results ==
=== Qualification ===
The qualification round took place on 14 July in two groups, with Group A starting at 09:25 and Group B starting at 10:48. Athletes attaining a mark of at least 60.00 metres ( Q ) or at least the 12 best performers ( q ) qualified for the final.

Rank	Group	Name	Nationality	Round			Mark	Notes
Rank	Group	Name	Nationality	1	2	3	Mark	Notes
1	B	Yauheni Bahutski	Belarus	54.80	58.19	61.72	61.72	Q
2	B	Wang Yuhan	China	x	60.38		60.38	Q, PB
3	B	Mohamed Ibrahim Moaaz	Qatar	55.53	x	59.46	59.46	q
4	B	Jakub Forejt	Czech Republic	53.90	58.72	x	58.72	q
5	A	Kai Chang	Jamaica	54.96	x	59.27	59.27	q
6	A	Giorgos Koniarakis	Cyprus	58.64	x	58.07	58.64	q
7	B	Tim Ader	Germany	58.38	x	x	58.38	q
8	A	Korbinian Häßler	Germany	x	58.35	x	58.35	q, PB
9	B	Emanuel Sousa	Portugal	57.43	x	x	57.43	q
10	A	Elijah Mason	United States	56.86	x	54.61	56.86	q
11	A	Martynas Alekna	Lithuania	56.78	x	X	56.78	q
12	A	Claudio Romero	Chile	54.16	56.71	56.62	56.71	q
13	B	Conor McLaughlin	Australia	56.57	x	x	56.57	
14	B	Gabriel Oladipo	United States	56.53	56.19	54.39	56.53	
15	A	Kristjan Čeh	Slovenia	51.77	56.47	54.38	56.47	
16	A	Jakub Lewoszewski	Poland	56.42	x	x	56.42	
17	B	Triston Gibbons	Barbados	x	x	56.31	56.31	
18	B	Dabirac Pérez	Cuba	x	x	56.20	56.20	
19	B	Casper Jørgensen	Denmark	52.70	56.02	x	56.02	
20	A	Michal Forejt	Czech Republic	55.64	55.71	55.71	55.71	
21	A	James Tomlinson	Great Britain	46.61	54.95	53.53	54.95	
22	B	Víctor Faus	Spain	52.86	54.85	x	54.85	
23	B	Marawan Medany	Bahrain	54.83	54.74	52.40	54.83	
24	A	Ignatius Marais	South Africa	54.56	x	x	54.56	
25	B	Mahmoud Mansouri	Iran	49.74	54.52	54.32	54.52	
26	B	Tom Reux	France	54.12	x	x	54.12	
27	A	Kosei Yamashita	Japan	52.35	53.72	x	53.72	
28	B	Shaquille Emanuelson	Netherlands	x	50.12	53.53	53.53	
29	A	Aarón Solà	Spain	53.41	51.72	x	53.41	
30	B	Aleks Hristov	Bulgaria	52.45	x	x	52.45	
31	A	Hossein Rasouli	Iran	51.60	x	x	51.60	
32	A	Alexander Kolesnikoff	Australia	48.33	48.88	50.75	50.75	
33	A	Badri Kimadze	Georgia	48.26	X	50.31	50.31	
34	A	Eero Ahola	Finland	x	47.74	x	47.74	

=== Final ===
The final was held on 15 July at 13:41.

Rank	Name	Nationality	Round						Mark	Notes
Rank	Name	Nationality	1	2	3	4	5	6	Mark	Notes
1st place, gold medalist(s)	Kai Chang	Jamaica	56.96	62.36	58.26	x	x	x	62.36	PB
2nd place, silver medalist(s)	Yauheni Bahutski	Belarus	60.17	61.31	60.76	61.75	x	x	61.75	
3rd place, bronze medalist(s)	Claudio Romero	Chile	60.81	x	58.66	x	x	x	60.81	SB
4	Tim Ader	Germany	57.14	58.47	60.09	58.01	58.80	x	60.09	PB
5	Mohamed Ibrahim Moaaz	Qatar	x	x	59.87	59.12	58.71	59.57	59.87	
6	Wang Yuhan	China	55.14	59.29	58.86	x	x	x	59.29	
7	Giorgos Koniarakis	Cyprus	58.04	56.92	x	x	57.89	x	58.04	
8	Elijah Mason	United States	x	57.96	x	x	x	56.77	57.96	
9	Jakub Forejt	Czech Republic	57.95	55.88	56.72				57.95	
10	Martynas Alekna	Lithuania	x	57.30	56.33				57.30	
11	Korbinian Häßler	Germany	x	x	55.42				55.42	
	Emanuel Sousa	Portugal	x	x	x				NM	
