= Adrian Kerr =

Jamaican athlete (born 2003)

Personal information
- Nationality: Jamaican
- Born: 7 October 2003 (age 23)

Sport
- Sport: Athletics
- Event: Sprint
- Club: Dynamic Speed; Motorcade
- Coached by: Michael Frater

Achievements and titles
- Personal bests: 60m: 6.68 (Kingston, 2026); 100m: 10.08 (San Jose, 2023); 200m: 20.08 (Tokyo, 2025)
Medal record
Men's athletics
Representing Jamaica
CAC Games
Silver medal – second place	2026 Santo Domingo	Mixed 4×100m relay
World U20 Championships
Silver medal – second place	2022 Cali	4x100m relay
NACAC U23 Championships
Gold medal – first place	2023 San Jose	100m
Gold medal – first place	2023 San Jose	4x100m relay
CARIFTA Games (U18)
Gold medal – first place	2019 George Town	4x100m relay

Adrian Kerr (born 7 October 2003) is a Jamaican sprinter. He placed third over 200 metres at the Jamaican Athletics Championships in 2025, having been a double gold medalist at the 2023 NACAC U23 Championships.

== Biography ==
Kerr attended Kingston College in Jamaica. At KC, he competed in the annual ISSA Boys and Girls Athletics Championships in the Sprints acquiring gold, silver, and bronze medals throughout the years.

== Career ==
Also, he earned a gold medal in the 4 X 100 metres at the 2019 CARIFTA Games in George Town, Cayman Islands.

He ran as part of the Jamaican 4 x 100 metres relay at the 2022 World Athletics U20 Championships in Cali, Colombia, winning a silver medal alongside Bouwahjgie Nkrumie, Bryan Levell and Mark-Anthony Daley.

Running in January 2023, he lowered his personal best for 100 metres to 10.42 seconds. He won gold in the 100 metres and in the 4 × 100 m relay at the 2023 NACAC U23 Championships in Costa Rica. In 2023, he ran for the newly-formed Motorcade Track Club in Kingston, Jamaica.

Kerr ran the 200 metres in a personal best time of 20.47 seconds at the Jamaica World Indoor Qualifiers at GC Foster College in March 2025. He won his 200 metres semi-final at the 2025 Jamaican Athletics Championships in 20.75 seconds (-0.1 m/s) before returning the following day to finish third in the final in 20.49 seconds. He ran a 200 metres personal best of 20.09 seconds (+1.8 m/s) to finish second behind T'Mars McCallum at the Ed Murphey Track Classic, a World Athletics Continental Tour Silver meet, on 12 July in Memphis, Tennessee. He was named in the Jamaican squad for the 2025 NACAC Championships in Nassau, The Bahamas.

In September 2025, he was a semi-finalist in the 200 metres at the 2025 World Championships in Tokyo, Japan, running a personal best 20.08 seconds without advancing to the final.

Kerr ran a personal best 6.68 seconds for the 60 metres (+1.1) at the 2026 Gibson McCook Relays in Kingston. At Velocity Fest on 19 April, he won the 200 m in 20.28 seconds, ahead of Oblique Seville. He was named in the Jamaica squad for the 2026 World Athletics Relays in Gaborone, Botswana, running on the opening day in the men's 4 x 100 metres alongside Rohan Watson, Odaine McPherson, and Rasheed Foster. He was named in the Jamaica team for the 2026 Central American and Caribbean Games.
