= 2015 World Youth Championships in Athletics – Girls' 400 metres hurdles =

Girls' 400 metres hurdles at the 2015 World Youth Championships in Athletics
- Venue: Estadio Olímpico Pascual Guerrero
- Dates: 15, 16 and 18 July
- Competitors: 30 from 21 nations
- Winning time: 55.94

Medalists
gold medal	Sydney McLaughlin	United States
silver medal	Xahria Santiago	Canada
bronze medal	Brandeé Johnson	United States

The girls' 400 metres hurdles at the 2015 World Youth Championships in Athletics was held at the Estadio Olímpico Pascual Guerrero in Cali, Colombia on 15, 16 and 18 July 2015.

Sydney McLaughlin set a championship record with a time of 55.94 s to win the gold medal.

== Records ==
Prior to the competition, the following records were as follows.

World Youth Best	Leslie Maxie (USA)	55.20	San Jose, United States	9 June 1984
Championship Record	Ebony Collins (USA)	55.96	Marrakesh, Morocco	15 July 2005
World Youth Leading	Sydney McLaughlin (USA)	55.28	Lisle, United States	1 July 2015

== Results ==
=== Round 1 ===
First 3 in each heat (Q) and the next 4 fastest (q) advance to the semifinals.

Rank	Heat	Name	Nationality	Time	Note
1	1	Sydney McLaughlin	United States	56.81	Q
2	1	Anne Kirkegaard	Denmark	58.08	Q, PB
3	2	Junelle Bromfield	Jamaica	58.89	Q
4	4	Brandeé Johnson	United States	59.23	Q
5	4	Ilaria Verderio	Italy	59.60	Q
6	3	Lea Ahrens	Germany	59.74	Q
7	4	Mizuki Murakami	Japan	1:00.06	Q
8	3	Xahria Santiago	Canada	1:00.14	Q
9	1	Linda Olivieri	Italy	1:00.23	Q
10	2	Amanda Holmberg	Sweden	1:00.49	Q
11	4	Lada Vondrová	Czech Republic	1:00.73	q, PB
12	3	Wang Chen	China	1:00.78	Q
13	1	Chisa Kitazawa	Japan	1:00.86	q
14	2	Aneja Simončič	Slovenia	1:01.09	Q
15	1	Ánna Kiáfa	Greece	1:01.30	q, PB
16	4	Olibía-Nikoléta Karayiánni	Greece	1:01.66	q
17	1	Safa Osman	Sudan	1:01.80	
18	1	Armouré Conradie	South Africa	1:01.88	
19	2	Megan Champoux	Canada	1:02.06	
20	3	Yamani Mudiyanselage	Sri Lanka	1:02.07	
21	3	Lluïsa Mitjà	Spain	1:02.31	
22	4	Kaja Škerlj	Slovenia	1:02.61	
23	3	Kristina Borukova	Bulgaria	1:03.34	
24	2	Corinna Schwab	Germany	1:04.29	
25	3	Shiann Salmon	Jamaica	1:05.56	
26	2	Adelina Akhmetova	Kazakhstan	1:05.79	
27	2	Sofía Díaz	Colombia	1:07.32	
–	2	Laila Neres	Brazil	DNF	
–	4	Yu Jiaru	China	DNS	
–	3	Teresa Gabriel	Mozambique	DNS	

=== Semifinal ===
First 3 in each heat (Q) and the next 2 fastest (q) advance to the final.

Rank	Heat	Name	Nationality	Time	Note
1	1	Sydney McLaughlin	United States	56.79	Q
2	2	Brandeé Johnson	United States	58.51	Q
3	1	Anne Kirkegaard	Denmark	58.56	Q
3	2	Ilaria Verderio	Italy	58.56	Q, SB
5	2	Junelle Bromfield	Jamaica	58.67	Q
6	2	Xahria Santiago	Canada	58.70	q
7	1	Lea Ahrens	Germany	58.90	Q, PB
8	1	Amanda Holmberg	Sweden	58.92	q
9	1	Linda Olivieri	Italy	59.03	PB
10	2	Wang Chen	China	59.18	PB
11	1	Mizuki Murakami	Japan	59.35	
12	2	Aneja Simončič	Slovenia	59.87	PB
13	1	Lada Vondrová	Czech Republic	1:00.84	
14	2	Ánna Kiáfa	Greece	1:02.12	
15	1	Olibía-Nikoléta Karayiánni	Greece	1:03.38	
16	2	Chisa Kitazawa	Japan	1:11.08	

=== Final ===
Rank	Name	Nationality	Time	Note
1st place, gold medalist(s)	Sydney McLaughlin	United States	55.94	CR
2nd place, silver medalist(s)	Xahria Santiago	Canada	56.79	PB
3rd place, bronze medalist(s)	Brandeé Johnson	United States	57.47	PB
4	Ilaria Verderio	Italy	57.75	PB
5	Anne Kirkegaard	Denmark	57.88	PB
6	Lea Ahrens	Germany	58.21	PB
7	Junelle Bromfield	Jamaica	58.49	
8	Amanda Holmberg	Sweden	59.89	
