= Charokee Young =

Jamaican athlete (born 2000)

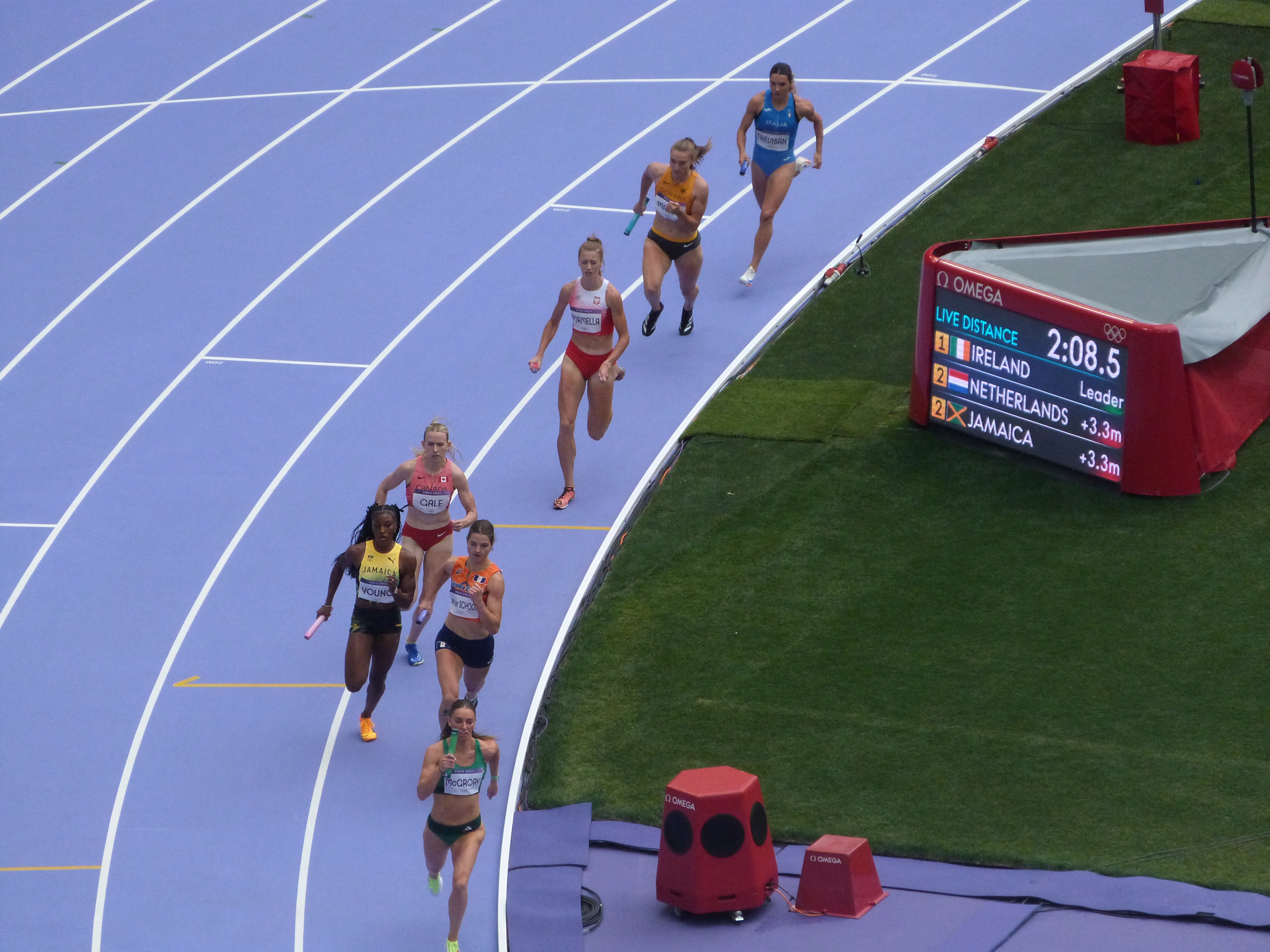
- Competing at the 2024 Olympic Games

Personal information
- Nationality: Jamaican
- Born: 21 August 2000 (age 26)

Sport
- Country: Jamaica
- Sport: Track and field
- Event: 400 meters
- College team: Texas A&M Aggies
- Club: Puma International; 2022-Present

Achievements and titles
- Personal best: 400m 49.87 (2022)
Medal record
Women's athletics
Representing Jamaica
World Championships
| Silver medal – second place | 2022 Eugene | 4 × 400 m relay |
| Silver medal – second place | 2023 Budapest | 4 × 400 m relay |
NACAC U23 Championships
| Gold medal – first place | 2021 San José | 400 m |
| Gold medal – first place | 2021 San José | 4 × 400 m mixed |
CARIFTA Games U20
| Silver medal – second place | 2018 Nassau | 400 m |

Charokee Young (born 21 August 2000) is a track and field athlete from Jamaica.

== Career ==
Young won the gold medal in the 400 meters at the 2021 NACAC U23 Championships in San Jose, Costa Rica. At that championships, she also won the gold medal in the mixed 4 x 400 metres relay alongside Shiann Salmon, Christopher Taylor and Odaine McPherson.

Young came third in the Jamaican national championships over 400 metres in 2022. At the 2022 World Athletics Championships in Eugene, Oregon Young qualified from the heats for the semi finals in the 400 meters where she placed 16th in 51.41 and ran in the 4 × 400 metres relay in which the team won the silver medal.

In February 2024, she competed in the 400 metres at the 2024 World Athletics Championships in Glasgow. She was part of the 4 × 400 m relay team which reached the final in Glasgow.

In April 2024, she was selected as part of the Jamiacan team for the 2024 World Athletics Relays in Nassau, Bahamas. She competed in the women's 4 × 400 metres relay at the 2024 Paris Olympics.

== NCAA ==
Charokee Young is a 2-time NCAA Division I champion, former collegiate outdoor 4 × 400 m relay record holder, 9-time NCAA Division I All-American sprinter & Southeastern Conference Champion.

| Year | Competition | Venue | Position | Event | Notes |
Representing Texas A&M Aggies track and field
| 2022 | 2022 NCAA Division I Outdoor Track and Field Championships | University of Oregon | 2nd | 400 metres | 50.65 |
| 2022 | 2022 NCAA Division I Outdoor Track and Field Championships | University of Oregon | 4th | 4 × 400 metres relay | 3:25.63 (p) |
| 2022 | SEC Outdoor Track and Field Championships | University of Mississippi | 2nd | 400 metres | 50.45 |
| 2022 | SEC Outdoor Track and Field Championships | University of Mississippi | 2nd | 4 × 400 metres relay | 3:22.01 |
| 2022 | 2022 NCAA Division I Indoor Track and Field Championships | Birmingham Metro CrossPlex | 7th | 400 metres | 51.61 |
| 2022 | SEC Indoor Track and Field Championships | Texas A&M University | 4th | 400 metres | 51.28 |
| 2022 | SEC Indoor Track and Field Championships | Texas A&M University | 2nd | 4 × 400 metres relay | 3:25.43 |
| 2021 | 2021 NCAA Division I Outdoor Track and Field Championships | University of Oregon | 5th | 400 metres | 51.13 |
| 2021 | 2021 NCAA Division I Outdoor Track and Field Championships | University of Oregon | 1st | 4 × 400 metres relay | 3:22.34 |
| 2021 | SEC Outdoor Track and Field Championships | Texas A&M University | 6th | 400 metres | 51.57 |
| 2021 | SEC Outdoor Track and Field Championships | Texas A&M University | 1st | 4 × 400 metres relay | 3:26.17 |
| 2021 | 2021 NCAA Division I Indoor Track and Field Championships | University of Arkansas | 4th | 400 metres | 51.41 |
| 2021 | 2021 NCAA Division I Indoor Track and Field Championships | University of Arkansas | 1st | 4 × 400 metres relay | 3:26.68 |
| 2020 | 2020 NCAA Division I Indoor Track and Field Championships | University of New Mexico | Cancelled due to COVID-19 | 800 metres | All-American |
| 2020 | 2020 NCAA Division I Indoor Track and Field Championships | University of New Mexico | Cancelled due to COVID-19 | 4 × 400 metres relay | All-American |
| 2020 | SEC Indoor Track and Field Championships | Gilliam Indoor Track Stadium; Texas A&M University | 3rd | 800 metres | 2:05.80 |
| 2020 | SEC Indoor Track and Field Championships | Gilliam Indoor Track Stadium; Texas A&M University | 7th | 4 × 400 metres relay | 3:34.73 |
