= Johnny Brackins =

American long jumper (born 2003)

Personal information
- Born: July 29, 2003 (age 23) Kansas City, Missouri, U.S.
- Education: Lee's Summit High School; Baylor University; University of Southern California
- Height: 193 cm (6 ft 4 in)
- Weight: 79 kg (174 lb)

Sport
- Country: United States
- Sport: Sport of athletics
- Event: Long jump
- College team: Baylor Bears; USC Trojans

Achievements and titles
- National finals: 2019 USA U20s; • Long jump, 6th; • Triple jump, 9th; 2022 NCAA Indoors; • Long jump, 7th; 2022 NCAAs; • Long jump, 17th; 2022 USA U20s; • 110m hurdles, 6th; • Long jump, 1st (gold); 2023 NCAA Indoors; • Long jump, 5th; 2023 USA Champs; • Long jump, 14th; 2024 USA Indoors; • Long jump, 1st (gold); 2024 NCAA Indoors; • Long jump, 4th; • 60m hurdles, 2nd (silver); 2024 NCAAs; • Long jump, 4th; • 110m hurdles, 9th; 2024 USA Champs; • Long jump, 4th
- Personal bests: LJ: 8.23m (2024); TJ: 15.69m (2022); 60mH: 7.55 (2024); 110mH: 13.37m (2024)
Medal record
Men's athletics
Representing the United States
World U20 Championships
Bronze medal – third place	2022 Cali	4 × 100 m relay
- Updated on December 2024

Johnny Brackins Jr. (born July 29, 2003) is an American long jumper and hurdler and the 2024 USA Indoor Track and Field Championships winner in the long jump. Brackins was a former U.S. U20 champion in the long jump and bronze medallist in the 4 × 100 m at the 2022 World Athletics U20 Championships. Representing the USC Trojans, Brackins also finished runner-up in the 60 meter hurdles at the 2024 NCAA Division I Indoor Track and Field Championships.

== Career ==
Competing for Lee's Summit High School, Brackins was a two-time Missouri State High School Activities Association champion in the long jump and a finalist in the long and triple jump at the 2019 USATF U20 Outdoor Championships. Brackins signed a letter of intent to compete for the University of Southern California out of high school, but he actually joined the Baylor Bears track and field team for one year instead, where he qualified for both the indoor and outdoor long jump NCAA championships placing 7th and 17th respectively.

After winning the long jump at the 2022 USA U20 Outdoor Track and Field Championships, Brackins qualified to represent the U.S. at the 2022 World Athletics U20 Championships in both the long jump and 4 × 100 m relay. Entering the long jump with the world's leading U20 mark, Brackins placed 6th with a 7.81 m leap. Later in the 4 × 100 m, Brackins led off the U.S. team in the heats and anchored for them in the finals to win the bronze medal behind Japan and Jamaica.

Following the 2022 season, Brackins transferred to the USC Trojans track and field program, improving his long jump finish to 5th at the 2023 NCAA Division I Indoor Track and Field Championships. In his first senior national final at the 2023 USA Outdoor Track and Field Championships, Brackins finished 14th in the long jump.

During the run-up to the 2024 Olympics, Brackins won his first national title at the 2024 USA Indoor Track and Field Championships and was qualified to represent the U.S. at the World Indoor Championships long jump, but he chose not to enter. Though Brackins only finished 4th in the long jump at the 2024 NCAA Indoor Championships, he improved to 2nd in the 60 m hurdles.

Outdoors, Brackins qualified for 110 m hurdles and long jump finals at the 2024 NCAA Division I Outdoor Track and Field Championships, finishing 4th again and 9th respectively. He entered in the long jump at the 2024 United States Olympic trials, and led all qualifiers going in to the finals. With only top three athletes in the finals guaranteed selection to the U.S. Olympic team, Brackins jumped 8.17 m and finished 4th.

== Personal life ==
Brackins was born on July 29, 2003 and grew up in Lee's Summit, Missouri, a suburb of the Kansas City metropolitan area. His father Johnny Brackins Sr. was a collegiate athlete that had competed at the United States Olympic trials in the past.

After graduating from Lee's Summit High School, Brackins spent one year at Baylor University before transferring to the University of Southern California.

Brackins took interest in business architecture and sought to become a medical lawyer after his athletic career ended.

== Statistics ==
=== Personal best progression ===
Long Jump progression
#	Mark	Pl.	Competition	Venue	Date	Ref.
1	7.20 m (−0.2 m/s)	3rd place, bronze medalist(s)	Great Southwest Classic	Albuquerque, NM	June 7, 2019	
2	7.35 m sh	1st place, gold medalist(s)	Mizzou HS Series Meet #2	Columbia, MO	February 8, 2020	
3	7.48 m sh	1st place, gold medalist(s)	Mizzou HS Series Championships	Columbia, MO	February 22, 2020	
4	7.78 m sh	1st place, gold medalist(s)	Larry Wieczorek Invitational	Iowa City, IA	January 21, 2022	
5	7.82 m sh	1st place, gold medalist(s)	Rod McCravy Memorial Track & Field Meet	Lexington, KY	January 27, 2022	
6	8.06 m (+0.9 m/s)	1st place, gold medalist(s)	Big 12 Championships	Lubbock, TX	May 13, 2022	
7	8.16 m sh	5th	NCAA Indoor Championships	Albuquerque, NM	March 9, 2023	
8	8.23 m sh	1st place, gold medalist(s)	USA Indoor Track and Field Championships	Albuquerque, NM	February 16, 2024	
