= 2021 NACAC U18 U20 and U23 Championships in Athletics =

2021 NACAC U18, U20 and U23 Championship
- Dates: 9–11 July
- Host city: San José, Costa Rica
- Venue: Estadio Nacional
- Level: Under 18, 20 and 23

The 2021 NACAC U23 Championships in Athletics was the 11th edition of the biennial NACAC U23 athletics championships. They were held in San José, Costa Rica from 9 July to 11 July. For the first time an U20 competition was held next to the U23 and U18 categories.

== Medal summary ==
=== U23 men ===
Event	Gold		Silver		Bronze	
100 metres	Kuron Griffith; Barbados	10.33	Odaine McPherson; Jamaica	10.39	Kion Benjamin; Trinidad and Tobago	10.40
200 metres	Alexander Ogando; Dominican Republic	20.59	Jevaughn Powell; Jamaica	20.83	Antonio Watson; Jamaica	21.03
400 metres	Jonathan Jones; Barbados	46.20	Christopher Taylor; Jamaica	46.58	Javeir Brown; Jamaica	47.54
800 metres	Juan Diego Castro; Costa Rica	1:48.66	Tyrese Reid; Jamaica	1:49.44	Aarón Hernández; El Salvador	1:54.47
1500 metres	Aarón Hernández; El Salvador	3:57.37	Marcos Cruz; Guatemala	3:58.27	Tyrese Reid; Jamaica	4:01.40
5000 metres	Marcial Rodríguez; Nicaragua	14:32.93	Only one participant			
110 metres hurdles (107 cm)	Orlando Bennett; Jamaica	13.65	Rasheem Brown; Cayman Islands	14.06	Yves Cherubin; Haiti	14.29
400 metres hurdles (91 cm)	Rasheeme Griffith; Barbados	52.06	Nathan Fergusson; Barbados	52.69	Luis Alonso Guevara; Costa Rica	54.78
3000 metres steeplechase (91 cm)	Marcial Rodríguez; Nicaragua	9:56.16	Brandon Barrantes; Costa Rica	10:07.86	Only two finishers	
4×100 metres relay	Jamaica; Antonio Watson; Christopher Taylor; Jevaughn Powell; Odaine McPherson	42.07	Costa Rica; Derick Leandro; Ivan Sibaja; Kluiverth Nuñez; Rasheed Miller	44.69	Only two teams	
10,000 m walk	Pedro Alexander López; Guatemala	43:55.84	Oscar Pop Choc; Guatemala	44:08.08	Juan Manuel Calderón; Costa Rica	44:12.97
High jump	Shaun Miller; Bahamas	2.21	Kyle Alcine; Bahamas	2.15	Byron Villalobos; Costa Rica; Raymond Richards; Jamaica	1.95
Pole vault	Julio Flores; Nicaragua	4.50	Héctor Juan; Dominican Republic	4.20	Only two finishers	
Long jump	Shakwon Coke; Jamaica	7.88	Clement Campbell; Trinidad and Tobago	7.37	Rasheed Miller; Costa Rica	7.15
Triple jump	Jonathan Miller; Barbados	16.00	Taeco O'Garro; Antigua and Barbuda	15.41	Jadon Brome; Barbados	15.12
Shot put (7.26 kg)	Courtney Lawrence; Jamaica	18.66	Elías Gómez; Costa Rica	13.44	Only two finishers	
Discus throw (2 kg)	Kai Chang; Jamaica	61.39	Roje Stona; Jamaica	61.21	Elías Gómez; Costa Rica	46.33
Hammer throw (7.26 kg)	Dylan Suárez; Costa Rica	61.14	Rodrigo Morán; Guatemala	53.04	Only two finishers	
Javelin throw (800 g)	Tyriq Horsford; Trinidad and Tobago	73.06	Keyshawn Strachan; Bahamas	72.13	Armando Caballero; Panama	63.50
Decathlon	Esteban Ibañez; El Salvador	6436 pts	Brainer Chavarria; Costa Rica	5189 pts	Only two participants	

=== U23 women ===
Event	Gold		Silver		Bronze	
100 metres	Halle Hazzard; Grenada	11.42	Amya Clarke; Saint Kitts and Nevis	11.90	Denisha Cartwritght; Bahamas	11.91
200 metres	Fiordaliza Cofil; Dominican Republic	23.89	Halle Hazzard; Grenada	24.07	Iantha Wright; Trinidad and Tobago	24.40
400 metres	Charokee Young; Jamaica	52.06	Shafiqua Maloney; Saint Vincent and the Grenadines	52.73	Fiordaliza Cofil; Dominican Republic	53.83
800 metres	Shafiqua Maloney; Saint Vincent and the Grenadines	2:08.13	Mikaela Smith; United States Virgin Islands	2:19.87	Only two participants	
100 metres hurdles (84 cm)	Daszay Freeman; Jamaica	13.80	Charisma Taylor; Bahamas	13.88	Sasha Wells; Bahamas	13.94
400 metres hurdles (76 cm)	Shiann Salmon; Jamaica	58.29	Only one parcipant			
5,000 m walk	Yasury Palacios; Guatemala	22:31.13 NU23R	Only one finisher			
High jump	Lamara Distin; Jamaica	1.85	Ángela González; Panama	1.65	Only two participants	
Triple jump	Charisma Taylor; Bahamas	13.22	Mikeisha Welcome; Saint Vincent and the Grenadines	13.16	Only two participants	
Shot put (4 kg)	Deisheline Mayers; Costa Rica	14.90 NR	Danielle Sloley; Jamaica	13.85	Lacee Barnes; Cayman Islands	13.75
Discus throw (1 kg)	Lacee Barnes; Cayman Islands	47.34	Acacia Astwood; Bahamas	36.78	Tania Sevilla; Costa Rica	33.32
Hammer throw (4 kg)	Acacia Astwood; Bahamas	51.22	Lindsay Reyes; Costa Rica	45.62	Only two finishers	
Javelin throw (600 g)	Deisheline Mayers; Costa Rica	41.98	Only one parcipant			
Heptathlon	Mariel Brokke; Costa Rica	4042 pts	Only one parcipant			

=== U23 mixed ===
Event	Gold		Silver		Bronze
4 × 400 metres relay	Jamaica; Shiann Salmon; Christopher Taylor; Odaine McPherson; Charokee Young	3:20.71	Bahamas; Sasha Wells; Shaun Miller; Charisma Taylor; Kyle Alcine	3:41.69	Only two participants

=== U20 men ===
Event	Gold		Silver		Bronze	
100 metres	Terrence Jones; Bahamas	10.47	Nazzio John; Grenada	10.62	Alejandro Ricketts; Costa Rica	10.69
200 metres	Wanya McCoy; Bahamas	21.17	Terrence Jones; Bahamas	21.18	Sandrey Davison; Jamaica	21.34
400 metres	Wanya McCoy; Bahamas	48.34	Handal Roban; Saint Vincent and the Grenadines	48.97	José Andrés Hernández; Costa Rica	50.22
800 metres	Handal Roban; Saint Vincent and the Grenadines	1:49.75	Matthew Cook; Costa Rica	1:56.99	Only two finishers	
110 metres hurdles (99 cm)	Antoine Andrews; Bahamas	14.27	Alton Roker; Bahamas	15.26	Only two participants	
400 metres hurdles (91 cm)	Dillon Leacock; Trinidad and Tobago	53.45	Only one participant			
4×100 metres relay	Bahamas; Antoine Andrews; Wanya McCoy; Demetrius Rolle; Terrence Jones	41.68	Costa Rica; Gary Altamirano; José Andrés Hernández; Stiver Alfaro; Alejandro Ricketts	43.17	Only two participants	
4×400 metres relay	Costa Rica; Gary Altamirano; Matthew Cook; Alejandro Ricketts; José Andrés Hernández	3:26.91	Only one team			
High jump	Romaine Beckford; Jamaica	2.10	Elias Ocampo; Costa Rica	1.80	Only two participants	
Long jump	Kavian Kerr; Jamaica	7.80	Miguel Aronategui; Panama	6.69	Elias Campo; Costa Rica	6.40
Triple jump	Nathan Crawford; Barbados	14.92	Elias Campo; Costa Rica	14.05	Gary Altamirano; Costa Rica	13.13
Shot put (6 kg)	Tarajah Hudson; Bahamas	15.93	Yoshua Villafuerte; Costa Rica	15.12	Jean Cerrud; Panama	14.40
Discus throw (1.75 kg)	Tarajah Hudson; Bahamas	52.45	Yoshua Villafuerte; Costa Rica	48.71	Jean Cerrud; Panama	38.75

=== U20 women ===
Event	Gold		Silver		Bronze	
100 metres	Camille Rutherford; Bahamas	11.36	Leah Bertrand; Trinidad and Tobago	11.70	Joella Lloyd; Antigua and Barbuda	11.70
200 metres	Camille Rutherford; Bahamas	23.42	Joella Lloyd; Antigua and Barbuda	23.55	Alliyah Francis; Jamaica	24.32
400 metres	Rae-Anne Serville; Trinidad and Tobago	54.85	Lacarthea Cooper; British Virgin Islands	55.66	Melanie Vargas; Costa Rica	59.78
800 metres	Jasmaine Knowles; Bahamas	2:15.25	María Chavez Madrigal; Costa Rica	2:30.82	Only two parcipants	
100 metres hurdles (84 cm)	Ackera Nugent; Jamaica	13.64	Luisana Alonso; Costa Rica	32.83	Only two parcipants	
4×100 metres relay	Costa Rica; Luisana Alonso; Melanie Vargas; Ivanniz Blackwood; Maryangel Morales	49.81	Only one team			
4×400 metres relay	Costa Rica; Luisana Alonso; Maryangel Morales; Melanie Vargas; Ivanniz Blackwood	4:08.66	Only one team			
High jump	María José Rodríguez Luna; Costa Rica	1.65	Only one parcipant			
Long jump	Shantae Foreman; Jamaica	6.07	Maryangel Morales; Costa Rica	5.00	Only two parcipants	
Triple jump	Maryangel Morales; Costa Rica	10.72	Only one parcipant			
Shot put (4 kg)	Carnitre Mackey; Bahamas	12.56	Only one parcipant			
Javelin throw (600 g)	Rhema Otabor; Bahamas	55.06	Carnitre Mackey; Bahamas	41.31	Only two parcipants	

=== U18 boys ===
Event	Gold		Silver		Bronze	
100 metres	Alicke Cranston; Jamaica	10.42 CR NU18R	Ajani Daley; Antigua and Barbuda	10.68	Kyle Lawrence; Saint Vincent and the Grenadines	10.71
200 metres	Alicke Cranston; Jamaica	20.74	Orlando Wint; Jamaica	21.10	Shimar Bain; Bahamas	21.65
400 metres	Delano Kennedy; Jamaica	47.75	Tahj Hamm; Jamaica	48.38	Shamar Smith; Bahamas	49.83
800 metres	Kemarrio Bygrave; Jamaica	1:54.35	Adrian Nethersole; Jamaica	1:56.63	Auder Franco; Guatemala	2:02.03
1500 metres	Esteban Oses; Costa Rica	4:33.24	Only one participant			
3000 metres	Paulo Gómez González; Costa Rica	9:03.39	Only one participant			
110 metres hurdles (91 cm)	Andre Harris; Jamaica	13.78	Otto Laing; Bahamas	13.82	Shamer Blake; Jamaica	14.08
400 metres hurdles	Roshawn Clarke; Jamaica	51.95 CR	Shimar Bain; Bahamas	53.39	Shamer Blake; Jamaica	55.20
2000 metres steeplechase (91 cm)	Paulo Gómez González; Costa Rica	6:10.97 CR NU18R	Auder Franco; Guatemala	6:44.94	Only two participants	
4×100 metres relay	Jamaica; Oshane Blackwood; Orlando Wint; Alicke Cranston; Andre Harris	40.60 CR NU18R	Bahamas; Adam Musgrove; Shamar Smith; Shimar Bain; Mateo Smith	42.10	Costa Rica; Sheymark Ramírez; Ian Hawkes; Andre García; Rasheed Sandoval	44.13
10,000 m walk	Bryan Matías Ortiz; Guatemala	43:55.66	Gabriel Alvarado Dávila; Nicaragua	44:05.16	Only two participants	
High jump	Aaron McKenzie; Jamaica	2.01	Brandon Pottinger; Jamaica	1.98	Alonzo Gaitan; Panama	1.80
Long jump	Uroy Ryan; Saint Vincent and the Grenadines	7.40	Jaydon Hibbert; Jamaica	7.31	Javar Thomas; Jamaica	7.14
Triple jump	Jaydon Hibbert; Jamaica	16.02 NU18R	Javar Thomas; Jamaica	14.89	Fernando Reyes Melgar; El Salvador	14.34
Pole vault	Denzel Ponce; Costa Rica	3.30	Only one participant			
Shot put (5 kg)	Zachry Campbell; Jamaica	16.27	Jeims Molina; Costa Rica	14.86	Antwon Hilly; Turks and Caicos Islands	14.20
Discus throw (1.5 kg)	Zachry Campbell; Jamaica	54.00	Jeims Molina; Costa Rica	40.59	Kaden Cartwright; Bahamas	38.65
Hammer throw (5 kg)	David Ayala Abrego; El Salvador	67.31	Jeims Molina; Costa Rica	47.09	Only two participants	
Javelin throw (700 g)	Nathaniel Zervos; Bahamas	67.96 CR NU18R	Kaden Cartwright; Bahamas	57.76	Marlon Sathoo; Cayman Islands	49.30
Decathlon (U18)	Franklin Daniel Núñez; Costa Rica	6436 pts	Only one participant			

=== U18 girls ===
Event	Gold		Silver		Bronze	
100 metres	Tina Clayton; Jamaica	11.17	Serena Cole; Jamaica	11.52	Mariandrée Chacón; Guatemala	11.81
200 metres	Alana Reid; Jamaica	23.78 CR NU18R	Mariandrée Chacón; Guatemala	24.06	Lacarthea Cooper; Bahamas	24.09
400 metres	Javoyna Walcourt; Bahamas	56.10	Lacarthea Cooper; Bahamas	56.63	Oneika Brissett; Jamaica	57.43
800 metres	Rickeisha Simms; Jamaica	2:23.75	Kishay Rowe; Jamaica	2:23.91	Keisy Mata; Costa Rica	2:33.68
1500 metres	Rickeisha Simms; Jamaica	05:03.01	Valeria Poveda; Costa Rica	05:17.65	Abigail Ramírez; Costa Rica	05:18.94
3000 metres	Valeria Poveda; Costa Rica	11:37.43	Abigail Ramírez; Costa Rica	11:39.23	Tanesia Gardiner; Turks and Caicos Islands	12:24.41
100 metres hurdles (76 cm)	Alexis James; Jamaica	13.31	Kerrica Hill; Jamaica	13.68	Maryell García; Costa Rica	15.65
400 metres hurdles (76 cm)	Alliah Baker; Jamaica	01:03.36 CR NU18R	Kasha Neilly; Bahamas	01:05.26	Maryell García; Costa Rica	01:10.02
5,000 m walk	Sharon Herrera; Costa Rica	23:18.14 NU18R	Lisbeth López; Guatemala	23:57.03	Yaquelin Teletor; Guatemala	25:39.87
4×100 metres relay	Jamaica; Serena Cole; Tina Clayton; Kerrica Hill; Alana Reid	45.49	Bahamas; Shavantae Roberts; Lacarthea Cooper; Javoyna Walcourt; Paige Archer	47.27	Costa Rica; Naydelin Calderon; Tania Alfaro; Anayely Muñoz; Amanda Muñoz	50.70
High jump	Rasheda Samuels; Jamaica	1.71 NU18R	Deijanae Bruce; Jamaica	1.71	Angely Cabezas; Costa Rica	1.45
Long jump	Serena Cole; Jamaica	5.72	Valeria Fernández Guillén; Guatemala	5.63	Anayely Muñoz; Costa Rica	5.26
Triple jump	Valeria Fernández Guillén; Guatemala	11.94	Danisha Chimillo; Guatemala	11.92	Amanda Muñoz; Costa Rica	11.70
Pole Vault	Eva Orlich; Costa Rica	2.50	Only one participant			
Shot put (3 kg)	Britannia Johnson; Jamaica	14.33	Britannie Johnson; Jamaica	13.94	Palesa Caesar; British Virgin Islands	12.89
Discus throw (1 kg)	Cedricka Williams; Jamaica	45.37 NU18R	Britannia Johnson; Jamaica	43.59	Calea Jackson; Bahamas	41.03
Hammer throw (3 kg)	Sophie Pérez; Guatemala	60.55 NU18R	Lucía Castro Jiménez; El Salvador	48.97	Nicole Calderón; Costa Rica	42.70
Javelin throw (500 g)	Rachell Pascal; Cayman Islands	36.45	Verónica Montoya; Costa Rica	34.12	Only two parcipants	
Heptathlon	Angely Cabezas; Costa Rica	3772 pts	Only one parcipant			

=== U18 mixed ===
Event	Gold		Silver		Bronze	
4 × 400 metres relay	Jamaica; Kishay Rowe; Roshawn Clarke; Oneika Brissett; Delano Kennedy	3:25.27	Bahamas; Shimar Bain; Lacarthea Cooper; Javoyna Walcourt; Shamar Smith	3:27.73	Costa Rica; Amanda Muñoz; Ian Hawkes; Naydelin Calderon; Andre García	3:45.26

== Medal table ==
* Host nation (Costa Rica)

Rank	Nation	Gold	Silver	Bronze	Total
1	Jamaica (JAM)	39	18	10	67
2	Costa Rica (CRC)*	19	20	23	62
3	Bahamas (BAH)	17	18	7	42
4	Guatemala (GUA)	5	8	3	16
5	Barbados (BAR)	5	1	1	7
6	Saint Vincent and the Grenadines (VIN)	3	3	1	7
7	Trinidad and Tobago (TTO)	3	2	2	7
8	El Salvador (ESA)	3	1	2	6
9	Nicaragua (NIC)	3	1	0	4
10	Cayman Islands (CAY)	2	1	2	5
11	Dominican Republic (DOM)	2	1	1	4
12	Grenada (GRN)	1	2	0	3
13	Antigua and Barbuda (ATG)	0	3	1	4
14	Panama (PAN)	0	2	2	4
15	British Virgin Islands (IVB)	0	1	1	2
16	Saint Kitts and Nevis (SKN)	0	1	0	1
16	U.S. Virgin Islands (VIR)	0	1	0	1
18	Turks and Caicos Islands (TCA)	0	0	4	4
19	Haiti (HAI)	0	0	1	1
Totals (19 entries)		102	84	61	247

== Participation ==
263 athletes (158 men and 105 women) from 19 nations participated in these championships.

- Antigua and Barbuda (4)
- Bahamas (35)
- Barbados (9)
- British Virgin Islands (2)
- Cayman Islands (6)
- Costa Rica (64)
- Dominican Republic (14)
- El Salvador (6)
- Grenada (2)
- Guatemala (14)
- Haiti (3)
- Jamaica (61)
- Nicaragua (3)
- Panama (17)
- Saint Kitts and Nevis (3)
- Saint Vincent and the Grenadines (6)
- Trinidad and Tobago (10)
- Turks and Caicos Islands (3)
- United States Virgin Islands (1)
