= Oskar Stachnik =

Polish track and field athlete

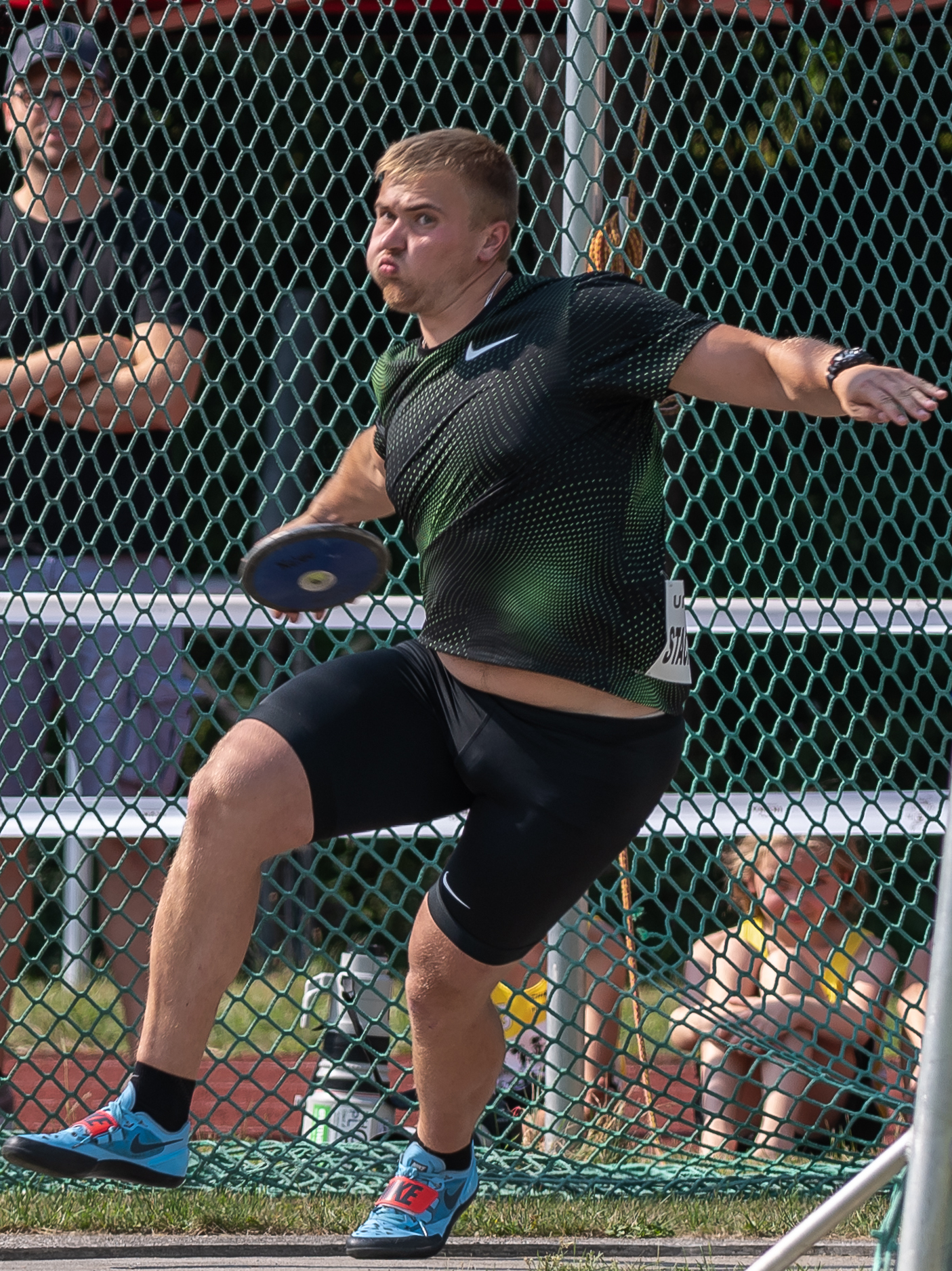
- Athletics Gala Linz 2018 by Isiwal

Personal information
- Born: 1 March 1998 (age 28) Szprotawa

Sport
- Country: Poland
- Sport: Athletics
- Event: Discus throw

Achievements and titles
- Personal best: Discus throw: 64.06 (2022)
Medal record
World U20 Championships
| Silver medal – second place | 2016 Bydgoszcz | Discus throw |
Summer World University Games
| Gold medal – first place | 2021 Chengdu | Discus throw |
European U23 Championships
| Bronze medal – third place | 2019 Gävle | Discus throw |
European U20 Championships
| Gold medal – first place | 2017 Grosseto | Discus throw |

Oskar Stachnik (born 1 March 1998) is a Polish discus thrower.

He is studying at the Maria Curie-Skłodowska University. He won a silver medal at the 2016 IAAF World U20 Championships and gold at the 2017 European Athletics U20 Championships. He won also a bronze medal at the 2019 European Athletics U23 Championships and a gold medal at the 2021 Summer World University Games.

== International competitions ==
| Year | Competition | Venue | Position | Event | Notes |
Representing Poland
| 2015 | World Youth Championships | Cali, Colombia | 13th (q) | Discus throw (1.5 kg) | 55.06 m |
| 2016 | World U20 Championships | Bydgoszcz, Poland | 2nd | Discus throw (1.75 kg) | 62.83 m |
| 2017 | European U20 Championships | Grosseto, Italy | 1st | Discus throw (1.75 kg) | 62.01 m |
| 2019 | European U23 Championships | Gävle, Sweden | 3rd | Discus throw | 60.01 m |
| 2022 | European Championships | Berlin, Germany | 12th | Discus throw | 60.36 m |
| 2023 | World University Games | Chengdu, China | 1st | Discus throw | 63.00 m |
| 2023 | World Championships | Budapest, Hungary | 25th (q) | Discus throw | 61.96 m |
| 2024 | European Championships | Rome, Italy | 10th | Discus throw | 62.35 m |
