= Claudio Romero =

Chilean discus thrower (born 2000)

Personal information
- Full name: Claudio Ignacio Romero Beltrán
- Born: 10 July 2000 (age 26) Santiago, Chile

Sport
- Country: Chile
- Sport: Track and field
- Event: Discus throw
- University team: Virginia Cavaliers
Medal record
Men's discus throw
Representing Chile
Pan American Championships
Gold medal – first place	2026 Medellín	Discus throw
Ibero-American Championships
Gold medal – first place	2026 Lima	Discus throw
South American Games
Gold medal – first place	2022 Asunción	Discus throw
Gold medal – first place	2026 Santa Fe	Discus throw
South American Championships
Gold medal – first place	2023 São Paulo	Discus throw
Gold medal – first place	2025 Mar del Plata	Discus throw
Bronze medal – third place	2019 Lima	Discus throw
Bolivarian Games
Silver medal – second place	2025 Ayacucho-Lima	Discus throw
World U20 Championships
Bronze medal – third place	2018 Tampere	Discus throw
World U18 Championships
Gold medal – first place	2017 Nairobi	Discus throw
Pan American U20 Championships
Gold medal – first place	2017 Trujillo	Discus throw
Gold medal – first place	2019 San José	Discus throw

Claudio Ignacio Romero Beltrán (born 10 July 2000) is a Chilean track and field athlete competing in the discus throw.

In 2017, he won the gold medal in the men's discus throw event at the 2017 IAAF World U18 Championships held in Nairobi, Kenya.

In 2018, he won the bronze medal in the men's discus throw event at the 2018 IAAF World U20 Championships held in Tampere, Finland.

In 2019, he competed in the men's discus throw event at the 2019 Pan American Games held in Lima, Peru. He did not record a mark. He also won a gold medal in the discus throw at the 2019 Pan American U20 Championships in San José, Costa Rica, extending his national record with a mark of 62.30 meters.

Competing collegiately for the Virginia Cavaliers, Romero was named a first-team All-American and won the ACC outdoor title in 2021. He was the 2022 NCAA discus champion defeating arch rival and NCAA discus record holder Mykolas Alekna,[by two centimeters].Who is the son of legendary Discus thrower Virgilijus Alekna. Claudio left his team at UVA to transfer to LSU. Although, his ties were cut there, he began his next journey in his career.

== International competitions ==
Year	Competition	Venue	Position	Event	Notes
Representing Chile
2016	World U20 Championships	Bydgoszcz, Poland	16th (q)	Discus throw (1.75 kg)	56.37 m
2016	South American U18 Championships	Concordia, Argentina	2nd	Shot put (5 kg)	19.14 m
2016	South American U18 Championships	Concordia, Argentina	2nd	Discus throw (1.5 kg)	60.49 m
2017	South American U20 Championships	Leonora, Guyana	3rd	Discus throw (1.75 kg)	52.23 m
2017	World U18 Championships	Nairobi, Kenya	3rd	Discus throw (1.5 kg)	64.33 m
2017	Pan American U20 Championships	Trujillo, Peru	1st	Discus throw (1.75 kg)	62.09 m
2017	Bolivarian Games	Santa Marta, Colombia	3rd	Discus throw	53.42 m
2018	World U20 Championships	Tampere, Finland	3rd	Discus throw (1.75 kg)	60.81 m
2018	South American U23 Championships	Cuenca, Ecuador	4th	Discus throw	50.65 m
2019	South American Championships	Lima, Peru	3rd	Discus throw	54.31 m
2019	South American U20 Championships	Cali, Colombia	1st	Discus throw (1.75 kg)	62.68 m
2019	Pan American U20 Championships	San José, Costa Rica	1st	Discus throw (1.75 kg)	62.07 m
2019	Pan American Games	Lima, Peru	–	Discus throw	NM
2022	World Championships	Eugene, United States	20th (q)	Discus throw	61.69 m
2022	South American Games	Asunción, Paraguay	1st	Discus throw	64.99 m
2023	South American Championships	São Paulo, Brazil	1st	Discus throw	63.24 m
2023	World Championships	Budapest, Hungary	23rd (q)	Discus throw	62.24 m
2023	Pan American Games	Santiago, Chile	–	Discus throw	NM
2024	Olympic Games	Paris, France	–	Discus throw	NM
2025	South American Championships	Mar del Plata, Argentina	1st	Discus throw	64.13 m
2025	Bolivarian Games	Lima, Peru	2nd	Discus throw	59.71 m
2026	Ibero-American Championships	Lima, Peru	1st	Discus throw	65.93 m
2026	Pan American Championships	Medellín, Colombia	1st	Discus throw	65.30 m
2026	South American Games	Santa Fe, Argentina	1st	Discus throw	65.33 m
