= Jevaughn Powell =

Jamaican athlete (born 2000)

Personal information
- Born: 19 November 2000 (age 25) Clarendon, Jamaica
- Height: 6 ft (183 cm)
- Weight: 165 lb (75 kg)

Sport
- Sport: Track and Field
- Event: 400m
- College team: UTEP Miners; Florida Gators
- Club: Racers Track club
- Coached by: Davian Clarke (UTEP); Mike Holloway (Florida); Glen Mills

Achievements and titles
- Personal bests: Outdoor; 200 m: 20.21 (Gainesville, FL 2024); 400 m: 44.54 (Eugene, OR 2024); Indoor; 200 m: 21.02i (College Station, Texas 2020); 400 m: 45.35i (Fayetteville, AR 2024)
Medal record
Male athletics
Representing the Jamaica
World Championships
Silver medal – second place	2022 Eugene	4×400 m relay
NACAC U23 Championships
Gold medal – first place	2021 San José	4x100 m
Silver medal – second place	2021 San José	200 m

Jevaughn Powell (born 19 November 2000) is a Jamaican sprinter who specializes in the 400 metres.

== Biography ==
Powell attended Edwin Allen and Kingston College high schools in Jamaica. At the 2017 ISSA Boys and Girls Championships in Kingston, he won the class two 400 metres in 48.11 for Edwin Allen at the time.

== Career ==
He competed collegiately for the University of Texas at El Paso before transferring to the University of Florida. "Powell was named a First Team All-American (400m, 4x100m, 4x400m) in 2024 and helped the Gators win their third consecutive NCAA Outdoor Championship as he scored points in three separate events: 400m (44.54 (PR) – 3rd Place, 6 Points); 4x100m (38.34 – 4th Place, 5 Points) and 4x400m (2:58.98 – 3rd Place, 6 Points)".

== 2021 - 2023 ==
Powell won the silver medal in the 200 meters at the 2021 NACAC U23 Championships in San Jose, Costa Rica, he was also a gold medalist in the men's 4 x 100 metres alongside Christian Taylor, Antonio Watson and Odaine McPherson at the championships.

Powell won the Jamaican national championships over 400 metres in 2022. At the 2022 World Athletics Championships in Eugene, Oregon Powell didn't qualify from the heats but did run in the 4 x 400 metres relay in which the team won the silver medal.

== 2024 ==
He finished third in the 400 metres at the Jamaican Athletics Championships in June 2024. He competed at the 2024 Summer Olympics over 400 metres in August 2024, reaching the semi-final.

== 2025 ==
In May 2025, he was named as a challenger in the long sprints category at the 2025 Grand Slam Track event in Philadelphia. He finished third in the final of the 400 metres in 45.08 seconds at the Jamaican Athletics Championships in June 2025, having qualified from the semi-finals with a time of 44.90 seconds. He was selected for the 2025 World Athletics Championships, running in the mixed 4 × 400 metres relay.

== 2026 ==
In May, he ran at the 2026 World Athletics Relays in the men's 4 × 400 metres relay in Gaborone, Botswana. In June, he was runner-up over 299 metres at the 2026 Jamaican Athletics Championships. In July, he was a finalist in the 200 metres at the 2026 Commonwealth Games in Glasgow, Scotland, placing fifth overall.

== Statistics ==
=== Circuit performances ===
Grand Slam Track results
Slam	Race group	Event	Pl.	Time	Prize money
2025 Philadelphia Slam	Long sprints	400 m	7th	46.08	US$10,000
2025 Philadelphia Slam	Long sprints	200 m	8th	20.91	US$10,000
