= Bouwahjgie Nkrumie =

Jamaican athlete

Personal information
- Nickname: Dr. Speed
- Nationality: Jamaican
- Born: 16 February 2004 (age 22)

Sport
- Sport: Athletics
- Events: 100m, 200m
- Club: Racers
- Coached by: Glen Mills

Achievements and titles
- Personal bests: 60 m: 6.57 (Kingston 2026); 100 m: 9.99 Previous NU20R (Kingston 2023); 200 m: 20.74 (Kingston 2024)
Medal record
Men's athletics
Representing Jamaica
Central American and Caribbean Games
Silver medal – second place	2026 Santo Domingo	100 m
Silver medal – second place	2026 Santo Domingo	4×100m relay
NACAC U23 Championships
Gold medal – first place	2026 Tlaxcala	100 m
Gold medal – first place	2026 Tlaxcala	4x100 m relay
World U20 Championships
Silver medal – second place	2022 Cali	100 m
Silver medal – second place	2022 Cali	4×100 m relay
Pan American U20 Championships
Silver medal – second place	2025 Asuncion	4 × 100m relay
Silver medal – second place	2023 Mayagüez	100 m
CARIFTA Games Junior (U20)
Gold medal – first place	2022 Kingston	4×100 m relay
Silver medal – second place	2022 Kingston	100 m
CARIFTA Games Youth (U18)
Gold medal – first place	2019 George Town	4×100 m relay
Silver medal – second place	2019 George Town	100 m

Bouwahjgie Nkrumie (born 16 February 2004) is a Jamaican track and field athlete who competes primarily in the 100 metres and 200 metres. He is the former Jamaican U20 men's 100m record holder, and the World Under-20 100m silver medallist. He is the first Jamaican U20 athlete to break the 10-second barrier.

== Early life ==
Nkrumie is from Black River in St. Elizabeth Parish. He attended Kingston College, Jamaica.

== Career ==
=== 2022 ===
In April 2022, Nkrumie ran a new personal best time of 10.28s to win silver in the under-20 100 metres at the 2022 CARIFTA Games. At the 2022 World Athletics U20 Championships in August 2022, Nkrumie was a double silver medallist. He finished second in the 100m, running a new national junior record time of 10.02. He later also won silver as part of the Jamaican 4 × 100 m relay team.

=== 2023 ===
On 29 March 2023 at the ISSA Boy's and Girl's Championship, he ran a new personal best of 9.99s for the 100m at the national stadium in Kingston. This made him the first Jamaican junior in history to run under 10 seconds. He also became only the third junior in history to break the 10-second barrier, after Letsile Tebogo (9.91s) in 2022 and Trayvon Bromell (9.97s) in 2014. Speaking after the event Nkrumie said that despite the time he had not executed his technique perfectly and felt he could go faster. He won the silver medal over 100 metres at the 2023 Pan American U20 Athletics Championships in Mayagüez, Puerto Rico, in August 2023.

=== 2025 ===
He ran 10.06 seconds to qualify for the final of the 100 metres at the Jamaican Athletics Championships in June 2025, before placing sixth in the final. He was named in the Jamaican squad for the 2025 NACAC Championships in Nassau, The Bahamas.

=== 2026 ===
Nkrumie ran a personal best 6.57 seconds for the 60 metres (+1.4) at the 2026 Gibson McCook Relays in Kingston. In July 2026, he won the gold medal in the 100 metres at the 2026 NACAC U23 Championships. Later at the championships he won the gold medal as part of the Jamaican 4 × 100 m relay team. In August, he won the silver medal behind Ronal Longa in the 100 metres at the 2026 CAC Games in Santo Domingo, Dominican Republic.

== Personal life ==
He is nicknamed “Dr Speed”.
