= Camille Rutherford (sprinter) =

Bahamian athlete (born 2002)

Personal information
- Nationality: Bahamian
- Born: 31 August 2002 (age 23)

Sport
- Sport: Athletics
- Event: Sprint

Achievements and titles
- Personal bests: 60 m: 7.21 (Houston, 2025); 100 m: 10.96 (London, Ontario, 2025); 200 m: 22.96 (Kortrijk, 2025)
Medal record
Athletics
Representing Bahamas
NACAC U-20 Championships
| Gold medal – first place | 2021 San Jose | 100 metres |
| Gold medal – first place | 2021 San Jose | 200 metres |

Camille Rutherford (born 31 August 2002) is a Bahamian sprinter. She became the national champion over 100 metres in 2024.

== Career ==
She broke the championship records for the 100 metres and 200 metres at the NACAC U20 Championships in Athletics in 2021. She reached the semi finals of the 100 metres at the 2021 World Athletics U20 Championships in Nairobi.

She was runner-up to Anthonique Strachan at the Bahamian national championship 100 metres race in July 2023.

She competed for the Bahamas at the 2024 World Athletics Relays in Nassau in April 2024. She became senior national champion in the 100 metres for the first time in June 2024. That month, she set a new 100 metres personal best running 11.20 seconds at the New Life International in the Bahamas.

She reached the semi-finals of the 60 metres at the 2025 World Athletics Indoor Championships in Nanjing, but did not proceed to the final. On 22 June 2025, she ran a personal best with a time of 10.96s (+1.2 m/s) in the women's 100m at the Bob Vigars Classic in Ontario. She was a finalist in the 100 metres at the 2025 NACAC Championships in Freeport, The Bahamas placing sixth overall in 11.23 seconds (+0.1).

In September 2025, she competed in the 100 metres at the 2025 World Championships in Tokyo, Japan.

== Personal life ==
She graduated with a Bachelor of Science in AG Communications and Journalism from Texas A&M University. She is the daughter of Chad and Demetria Rutherford and the niece of Olympic medalist Frank Rutherford. Has 2 sisters Chansonique and Destiny Rutherford.
