= Clemens Prüfer =

German discus thrower (born 1997)

Personal information
- Born: 13 August 1997 (age 28) Potsdam, Germany

Sport
- Sport: Athletics
- Event: Discus throw
Medal record
Men's athletics
Representing Germany
European Throwing Cup
Silver medal – second place	2025 Nicosia	Discus throw
European U23 Championships
Silver medal – second place	2019 Gävle	Discus throw
Bronze medal – third place	2017 Bydgoszcz	Discus throw
Youth Olympic Games
Silver medal – second place	2014 Nanjing	Boys' discus throw
- Updated on 30 July 2021

Clemens Prüfer (born 13 August 1997) is a German athlete specialising in the discus throw. He competed at the 2020 and 2024 Olympic Games, placing sixth overall in Paris in 2024.

== Early and personal life ==
Clemens and his brother Henning both compete in the discus throw and transferred together from Sportclub Neubrandenburg to SC Potsdam. He began studying business informatics at the University of Potsdam in October 2017.

== Career ==
In 2017, Prüfer not won the U23 German championships ahead of his brother Henninh, and finished in third place at the 2017 European Athletics U23 Championships in Bydgoszcz, Poland. His best distance with the two-kilogram men's discus improved in 2018 to 62.48 meters. In July 2019, he was a silver medalist at the 2019 European Athletics U23 Championships in Gävle, Sweden.

He represented Germany at the 2020 Summer Olympics in Tokyo 2021, where he finished 11th with a distance of 61.75 meters.

At the German throwing cup in Brandenburg in May 2024, he threw a new personal best of 69.09 metres, the longest throw by a German athlete since 2013. He was selected for the 2024 European Athletics Championships in Rome, Italy, where he placed sixth overall with a throw of 64.60 metres. He competed in the discus throw at the 2024 Summer Olympics in Paris in August 2024, qualifying for the final and placing sixth overall with a best throw of 67.41 metres.

He won the silver medal at the 2025 European Throwing Cup in Nicosia, Cyprus, behind compatriot Henrik Janssen, with a throw of 63.55 metres. He threw 71.01 metres in Ramona, Oklahoma on 13 April 2025.
