= Yauheni Bahutski =

Belarusian discus thrower (born 1999)

Yauheni Bahutski (Belarusian: Яўгеній Багуцкі; born 7 September 1999 in Minsk Region) is a Belarusian discus thrower.

His personal best is 66.03 m, set at Regional Sport Complex, Brest, Belarus on 29 April 2021, which qualified him for the 2020 Olympic Games. He won the discus throw at the 2021 European Throwing Cup in Split in 2021 with the Championship record.

He finished second at the 2018 IAAF World U20 Championships.
