= Halle Hazzard =

Grenadian sprinter (born 1999)

Personal information
- Full name: Halle Michelle Hazzard
- Nationality: Grenadian
- Born: 4 February 1999 (age 27)

Sport
- Country: Grenada
- Sport: Track and field
- Event(s): 100m, 200m
- College team: Virginia Cavaliers

Achievements and titles
- Personal best(s): 100m 11.29; 200m 23.68; 400m 56.75; 55m (Indoor) 6.91; 60m (Indoor) 7.24; 200m (Indoor) 23.45
Medal record
Women's athletics
Representing Grenada
CARIFTA Games(U20)
Silver medal – second place	2017 Willemstad	200 m
Bronze medal – third place	2017 Willemstad	100 m
OECS Track and Field Championships
Bronze medal – third place	2017 St.George's, Grenada	100m
Bronze medal – third place	2017 St.George's, Grenada	4x400m Relay
NACAC Under-23 Championships in Athletics
Gold medal – first place	2021 San José	100 m
Silver medal – second place	2021 San José	200 m
Bronze medal – third place	2019 Queretaro, Mexico	100m

Halle Michelle Hazzard (born 4 February 1999) is a Grenadian sprinter and sister of Grenadian sprinter Payton Hazzard. She made her competitive debut for Grenada at the 2017 CARIFTA Games, where she earned a Silver medal and as well as a Bronze Medal in the 200m and 100m respectively. She then went to Grenada to compete in the 3rd OECS Track And Field Championships. At this meet she was able to secure two Bronze medals. One in the Women 100 Meter Dash OECS with a time of 11.76 seconds and another as part of Grenada's 4 × 100 m relay team which included Chelsea Mitchell, Jonair Thomas and Amanda Crawford. On 14 February Halle broke the Grenadian 60m at the Tiger Paw Invite. She surpassed her UVA record-setting run of 7.31 from the week prior three times during the meet. She ran a time of 7.27 during the prelims before dropping the time in the semifinals with a 7.24 run. She closed the day with a time of 7.30 in the finals to finish fifth in the event. Her time ranks second in the ACC and 13th in the NCAA. Hazzard also captured a career-best time in the 200m dash. Her time of 23.79 ranks second in school history. She further lowered that time to 23.45 seconds in the prelims of the 2021 ACC Indoor Championships and moved to the #1 all time in the event for her school. She was also named as a Qualifier for the 2021 Indoor Championships in the 60m

== Competition record ==
Year	Competition	Venue	Position	Event	Notes
Representing Grenada
2017	Carifta Games (U20)	Willemstad, Curacao	3rd	100 m	11.67
2017	Carifta Games (U20)	Willemstad, Curacao	2nd	200 m	24.15
2017	OECS Track and Field Championships	Kirani James Athletic Stadium, Grenada	3rd	100m	11.76
2017	OECS Track and Field Championships	Kirani James Athletic Stadium, Grenada	3rd	4 × 100 m Relay	47.24
2019	NACAC Under-23 Championships in Athletic	Queretaro, Mexico	3rd	100 m	11.20 W
2019	Pan American Games	Lima, Peru	12th (sf)	100 m	11.70
2019	Pan American Games	Lima, Peru	17th (sf)	200 m	24.03
2021	NACAC Under-23 Championships in Athletic	San José, Costa Rica	1st	100 m	11.42
2021	NACAC Under-23 Championships in Athletic	San José, Costa Rica	2nd	200 m	24.07
