= Charisma Taylor =

Bahamian sprint hurdler and triple jumper

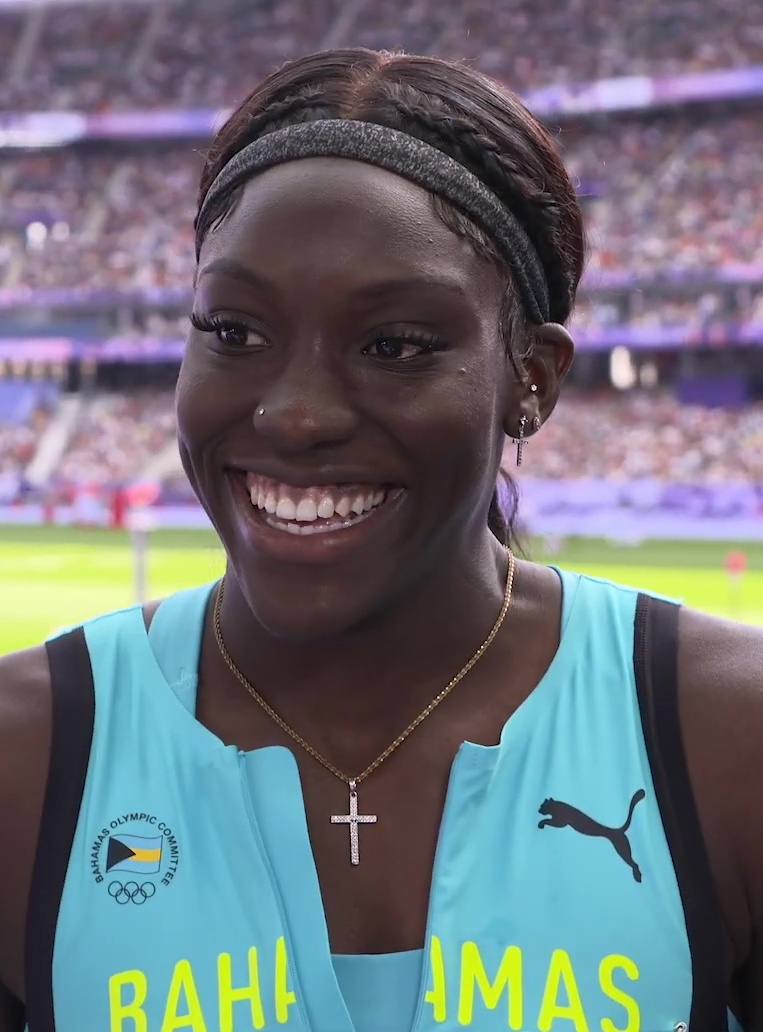
- Taylor at the 2024 Summer Olympics

Personal information
- Born: 3 September 1999 (age 26) Nassau, Bahamas
- Height: 180 cm (5 ft 11 in)

Sport
- Sport: Track and field
Medal record
Women's Athletics
Representing Bahamas
NACAC U23 Championships
Gold medal – first place	2021 San Jose	Triple Jump
Silver medal – second place	2021 San Jose	100m Hurdles
Bronze medal – third place	2019 Querétaro	Triple jump
CARIFTA Games (Under 18)
Gold medal – first place	2015 Basseterre	Long jump
Gold medal – first place	2015 Basseterre	Triple jump
Gold medal – first place	2016 St. George's	Triple jump

Charisma Taylor (born 3 September 1999) is a Bahamian hurdler and jumper who competes in the 100 metres hurdles, triple jump and long jump. She competed at the 2024 Summer Olympics in both the triple jump and the 100 metres hurdles.

== Career ==
Taylor has won multiple CARIFTA Games gold medals, including winning both the high jump and the triple jump in 2015. She advanced into the semifinals for the 100 metres hurdles at the 2015 World Youth Championships, finishing 21st. At the 2018 World U20 Championships, she finished 13th in the triple jump.

Taylor finished fifth in the triple jump at the 2021 NCAA Indoor Championships and set the national indoor record. She finished fourth in the triple jump and sixth in the long jump at the 2023 NCAA Outdoor Championships. She then represented the Bahamas at the 2023 World Athletics Championships and finished 29th in the triple jump.

At the 2024 World Indoor Championships, Taylor finished sixth in both the triple jump and the 60 metres hurdles. She qualified to represent the Bahamas at the 2024 Summer Olympics in the 100 metres hurdles and the triple jump. In the triple jump, she finished 15th in the qualifying rounds and missed the top-12 final. She set a personal best time of 12.63 seconds in the 100 metres semifinal but did not advance into the final.

Taylor competed in the 100 metres hurdles at the 2025 World Championships and finished sixth in her heat, failing to advance. At the 2026 World Indoor Championships, she finished 14th in the triple jump and fourth in her 60 metres hurdles semifinal heat.

== Personal life ==
Taylor attended SPIRE Institute and Academy in Geneva, Ohio, before going on to compete for Washington State Cougars and the Tennessee Volunteers. She was diagnosed with alopecia in 2022.

== Personal bests ==
Event	Time	Venue	Date
100m Hurdles	12.76 (+1.8)	Gainesville, Florida	13 April 2024
Triple jump	14.88 m	Albuquerque, New Mexico	11 March 2023
Long jump	6.64 m	Albuquerque, New Mexico	10 March 2023
60m Hurdles (indoor)	7.91	Glasgow, Scotland	3 March 2024
Long jump (indoor)	6.45 m	Fayetteville, Arkansas	11 FEB 2022
Triple jump (indoor)	13.96 m NR	Birmingham, Alabama	12 MAR 2022
