= Antoine Andrews =

Bahamian athlete

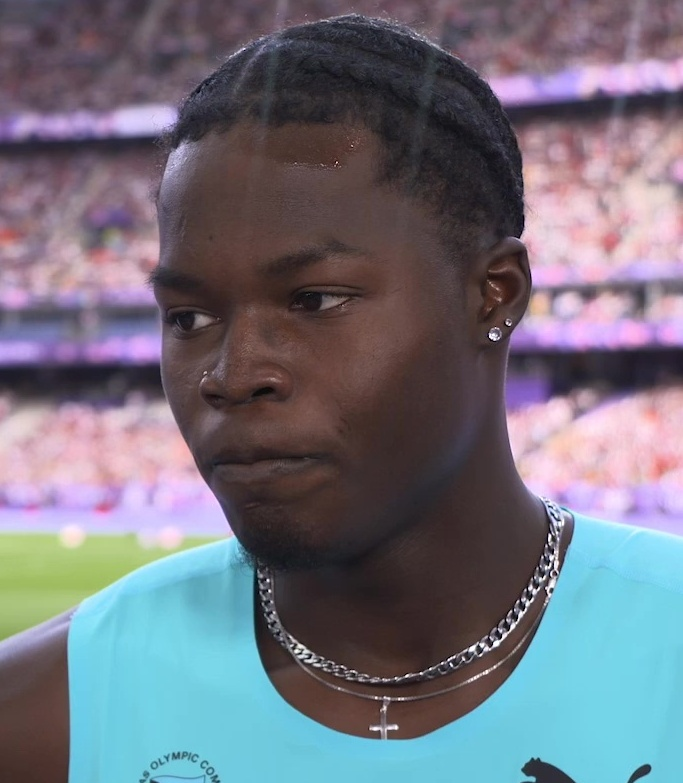

Personal information
- Nationality: Bahamian
- Born: 12 April 2003 (age 23)

Sport
- Sport: Athletics
- Events: 100m, 200m, 400m, 110m hurdles, 400m hurdles

Achievements and titles
- Personal bests: 60mH: 7.49 (Lubbock, 2026) NR; 110mH: 13.34 (Nassau, 2024) NR
Medal record
Men's athletics
Representing Bahamas
World U20 Championships
Gold medal – first place	2022 Cali	110m hurdles
NACAC U23 Championships
Silver medal – second place	2023 San Jose	110m hurdles

Antoine Andrews (born 12 April 2003) is a Bahamian athlete. He won the gold medal at the 2022 IAAF World Junior Championships in the 110m hurdles.

== Career ==
Andrews attended St. John's College in Nassau, Bahamas. The athlete competes in 100m, 200m, 400m, 400m hurdles as well as his speciality, the 110m hurdles.

Andrews won gold at the 2021 U20 NACAC Championships in the 110m hurdles. He claimed the bronze medal at the 2022 CARIFTA Games 110m hurdles, in Kingston, Jamaica and also competed in the 400 metres race and qualified for the final in which he finished sixth. Andrews broke the national junior record as he won the Bahamas national championship u20 110m hurdles race in June, 2022 in Nassau.

Andrews broke the national 110m hurdles record again in the heats of the 2022 World Athletics U20 Championships, running a time of 13.36 seconds. He then won the final the following day in a lower time as he won gold in 13.23 seconds. This equalled the world leading time for an under-20 athlete in 2022. In doing so, he claimed the first Bahamian gold medal in any global championships in a hurdles event.

Andrews won the silver medal in the 110 metres hurdles at the 2023 NACAC U23 Championships in San Jose, Costa Rica, finishing behind Connor Schulman in 13.57 seconds. The following year, Andrews set a new Bahamian national record with a time of 13.34 seconds to win the national title in Nassau. He competed at the 2024 Olympic Games, in Paris, France, reaching the semifinals of the 110m hurdles.

In January 2026, Andrews equalled the 60 metres hurdles national record with a winning time of 7.49 seconds at the Corky Classic in Texas, ahead of Connor Schulman.
