= Kuron Griffith =

Barbadian athlete

- Griffith at the 2026 Commonwealth Games

Personal information
- Nationality: Barbadian
- Born: 4 January 1999 (age 27)

Sport
- Sport: Athletics
- Event: Sprint

Achievements and titles
- Personal bests: 100 meters: 10.18 (2025); 200 meters: 20.43 (2024)
Medal record
Men's athletics
Representing Barbados
NACAC U23 Championships
Gold medal – first place	2021 San José	100 m

Kuron Griffith (born 4 January 1999) is a sprinter from Barbados. He has won national titles over both the 100 metres and 200 metres.

== Biography ==
A member of the Quantum Leap Track Programme in Barbados, Griffith lowered his personal best for 200 metres to 20.99 seconds at the Athletics Association of Barbados May Classic track and field meet in May 2021. He also won the 100 metres that weekend. The following month, he won the Barbados Athletics Championships title over 100 metres in June 2021 at the University of the West Indies Usain Bolt Sports Complex, running 10.30 seconds to finish ahead of defending champion Mario Burke. He won the gold medal in the 100 meters at the 2021 NACAC U23 Championships in San Jose, Costa Rica, running 10.33 seconds to finish ahead of Jamaican Odaine McPherson, and Kion Benjamin. He also had the leading time from the semi-finals, running 10.34 seconds to qualify for the final.

Griffith competed for Barbados at the 2023 Central American and Caribbean Games in San Salvador, El Salvador.

He won the Barbados championships titles over 100 metres and 200 metres in 2025 in Bridgetown. He subsequently placed fifth in the final of the 100 metres at the 2025 NACAC Championships in Freeport, The Bahamas, running a personal best 10.18 seconds. In September 2025, he came through the preliminary round in the 100 metres at the 2025 World Championships in Tokyo, Japan, without advancing to the semi-finals.

In July 2026, he competed in the 100 metres at the 2026 Commonwealth Games reaching the semi-finals. He was also a semi-finalist in the 200 metres at the Games in Glasgow, Scotland.
