= Shiann Salmon =

Jamaican athlete (born 1999)

Personal information
- Nationality: Jamaican
- Born: 31 March 1999 (age 27)

Sport
- Sport: Athletics
- Events: 400 metres hurdles; 400 metres
- Club: TBBTC; SprinTec
- Coached by: Tonja Buford-Bailey; Maurice Wilson; Corey Bennett

Achievements and titles
- Personal best: 400 m hurdles: 52.97 (2024)
Medal record
Women's athletics
Representing Jamaica
World Championships
| Silver medal – second place | 2023 Budapest | 4×400 m relay |
Commonwealth Games
| Silver medal – second place | 2022 Birmingham | 400 m hurdles |
| Silver medal – second place | 2022 Birmingham | 4×400 m relay |
NACAC Championships
| Gold medal – first place | 2022 Freeport | 400 m hurdles |
| Silver medal – second place | 2022 Freeport | 4×400 m relay |
Diamond League
| Third place | 2024 Brussels | 400 mh |
World U20 Championships
| Silver medal – second place | 2018 Tampere | 400 m hurdles |
| Bronze medal – third place | 2018 Tampere | 4×400 m relay |
NACAC U23 Championships
| Gold medal – first place | 2021 San José | 400 m hurdles |
| Gold medal – first place | 2021 San José | 4×400 m mixed |
| Gold medal – first place | 2019 Queretaro | 4×400 m mixed |
| Silver medal – second place | 2019 Queretaro | 400 m hurdles |
Carifta Games Junior (U20)
| Gold medal – first place | 2018 Nassau | 400 m hurdles |
| Gold medal – first place | 2017 Willemstad | High jump |
| Gold medal – first place | 2017 Willemstad | 4×400 m relay |
| Silver medal – second place | 2017 Willemstad | 400 m hurdles |
Carifta Games Youth (U18)
| Gold medal – first place | 2016 St. George's | 400 m hurdles |
| Gold medal – first place | 2016 St. George's | High jump |
| Gold medal – first place | 2016 St. George's | 4×400 m relay |
| Gold medal – first place | 2015 Basse-Terre | High jump |

Shiann Salmon (born 31 March 1999) is a Jamaican track and field athlete who specializes in the 400 metres hurdles and 400 metres. She represented Jamaica at the 2019 and 2025 World Athletics Championships, competing in women's 400 metres hurdles.

== Biography ==
Salmon was educated at Hydel High School in St. Catherine, Jamaica. She competed at the annual ISSA Boys and Girls Athletics Championships. In her final year, she won four gold medals at the championship in the 400 metres, 400m hurdles, the 4 × 400 m relay, and the 4 × 100 m relay.

== Career ==
Salmon competed at the 2018 IAAF World U20 Championships, placing second in the Women's 400 meters hurdles event and third in the Women's 400 meters relay.

In 2019 Salmon finished second at the Jamaican Championships, qualifying her for the 2019 World Championships, where she made the semi-finals. She won the 400 m hurdles and the 400 m mixed relay gold medals in the 2021 NACAC U23 Championships.

In 2022, Salmon ran a new personal best of 53.82 s over 400 m hurdles to place second at the Jamaican Championships thus qualifying her for the 2022 World Championships where she made the semi-finals. She also competed at the 2022 Commonwealth Games, winning silver medals in the 400 m hurdles and Women's 4x400 m relay.

At the 2023 World Championships, Salmon won a silver medal in the Women's 4x400 m relay, for her run in the heats.

In 2024, Salmon finished third over 400 m hurdles at the Jamaican Championships, and qualified for the 2024 Summer Olympics. She ran a personal best of 53.13 s to qualify for the final, where she finished sixth. She won her first Diamond League at the Athletissima in Zurich, in a new personal best of 52.97 s, her first time under the 53-second barrier.

In September 2025, Salmon finished eighth in the 400 m hurdles final at the World Championships with a time of 56.27 s.

== Statistics ==
=== Circuit performances ===
Grand Slam Track results
| Slam | Race group | Event | Pl. | Time | Prize money |
|---|---|---|---|---|---|
| 2025 Kingston Slam | Long hurdles | 400 m hurdles | 6th | 55.89 | US$25,000 |
| 2025 Kingston Slam | Long hurdles | 400 m | 4th | 52.25 | US$25,000 |
| 2025 Miami Slam | Long hurdles | 400 m hurdles | 4th | 54.62 | US$25,000 |
| 2025 Miami Slam | Long hurdles | 400 m | 5th | 52.17 | US$25,000 |

=== International competitions ===
| Year | Competition | Venue | Position | Event | Notes |
Representing Jamaica
| 2013 | CARIFTA Games (U17} | Nassau, Bahamas | 3rd | High jump | 1.60 m |
| 2015 | CARIFTA Games (U18} | Basseterre, Saint Kitts and Nevis | 1st | High jump | 1.73 m |
| 2015 | World Youth Championships | Cali, Colombia | 25th (h) | 400 m hurdles | 1:05.56 |
| 2016 | CARIFTA Games (U18} | St. George's, Grenada | 1st | 400 m hurdles (76 cm) | 59.50 |
| 2016 | CARIFTA Games (U18} | St. George's, Grenada | 1st | High jump | 1.82 m |
| 2016 | CARIFTA Games (U18} | St. George's, Grenada | 1st | 4 × 400 m relay | 3:39.31 |
| 2017 | CARIFTA Games (U20} | Willemstad, Curaçao | 2nd | 400 m hurdles (76 cm) | 59.59 |
| 2017 | CARIFTA Games (U20} | Willemstad, Curaçao | 1st | High jump | 1.76 m |
| 2017 | CARIFTA Games (U20} | Willemstad, Curaçao | 1st | 4 × 400 m relay | 3:37.96 |
| 2018 | CARIFTA Games (U20} | Nassau, Bahamas | 1st | 400 m hurdles (76 cm) | 56.22 |
| 2018 | CARIFTA Games (U20} | Nassau, Bahamas | – (f) | 4 × 400 m relay | DQ |
| 2018 | World U20 Championships | Tampere, Finland | 2nd | 400 m hurdles | 56.11 |
| 2018 | World U20 Championships | Tampere, Finland | 3rd | 4 × 400 m relay | 3:31.90 |
| 2019 | NACAC U23 Championships | Querétaro, Mexico | 2nd | 400 m hurdles | 56.83 |
| 2019 | NACAC U23 Championships | Querétaro, Mexico | 1st | 4 × 400 m relay mixed | 3:16.99 |
| 2019 | World Championships | Doha, Qatar | 11th (sf) | 400 m hurdles | 55.16 |
| 2021 | NACAC U23 Championships | San José, Costa Rica | 1st | 400 m hurdles | 58.29 |
| 2021 | NACAC U23 Championships | San José, Costa Rica | 1st | 4 × 400 m relay mixed | 3:20.71 |
| 2022 | World Championships | Eugene, United States | 8th (sf) | 400 m hurdles | 54.16 |
| 2022 | Commonwealth Games | Birmingham, England | 2nd | 400 m hurdles | 54.47 |
| 2022 | Commonwealth Games | Birmingham, England | 2nd | 4 × 400 m relay | 3:26.93 |
| 2022 | NACAC Championships | Freeport, Bahamas | 1st | 400 m hurdles | 54.22 |
| 2022 | NACAC Championships | Freeport, Bahamas | 2nd | 4 × 400 m relay | 3:26.32 |
| 2023 | World Championships | Budapest, Hungary | 2nd (h) | 4 × 400 m relay | 3:22.74^{1} |
| 2024 | Olympic Games | Paris, France | 6th | 400 m hurdles | 53.29 |
| 2024 | Olympic Games | Paris, France | – (f) | 4 × 400 m relay | DNF |
| 2025 | World Championships | Tokyo, Japan | 8th | 400 m hurdles | 56.27 |
| 2026 | Commonwealth Games | Glasgow, United Kingdom | 5th | 400 m hurdles | 55.54 |
| 2026 | World Ultimate Championship | Budapest, Hungary | 16th (h) | 400 m hurdles | 56.35 |

^{1}Time from the heats; Salmon was replaced in the final.

=== Personal Bests ===
Personal bests (main event in bold):

- 200m: 23.64s (Austin, Texas, 2023)
- 400m: 51.22s (Kingston, 2023)
- 400m hurdles: 52.97s (Zurich, 2024)
