= Kai Chang =

Jamaican athlete

Personal information
- Nationality: Jamaican
- Born: 29 January 2000 (age 26)
- Height: 2.04 m (6 ft 8 in)

Sport
- Sport: Track and Field
- Event: Discus throw
- College team: University of the West Indies; Florida Gators
Medal record
Men's athletics
Representing Jamaica
Summer World University Games
Silver medal – second place	2023 Chengdu	Discus throw
World U20 Championships
Gold medal – first place	2018 Tampere	Discus throw
NACAC U23 Championships
Gold medal – first place	2021 San José	Discus throw
Carifta Games Junior (U20)
Gold medal – first place	2019 George Town	Discus throw
Silver medal – second place	2018 Nassau	Discus throw
Bronze medal – third place	2019 George Town	Shot put

Kai Chang (born January 29, 2000) is a Jamaican discus thrower. He won the IAAF 2018 World U20 championships and has stamped his class at numerous international events in his career.

== Career ==
Chang won the Jamaica Athletics Administrative Association (JAAA) Junior Championships and then on July 15, 2018, with a personal best of 62.36m Chang won the gold medal for the discus at the 2018 IAAF World U20 Championships to become World Junior Champion.

In April 2021, Chang threw over 60m for the first time as a senior, and then improved to a personal best of 62.60 at the Jamaican National Stadium in Kingston. He later threw an improved personal best of 63.33 in June 2021, at the NACAC New Life Invitational in Florida. Chang ended the season with a PR of 64.49m, ranking him as the second best in his country for the 2021 season.

He won the discus throw gold medal in the 2021 NACAC U23 Championships.
