= Wanya McCoy =

Bahamian sprinter (born 2003)

Wanyá McCoy
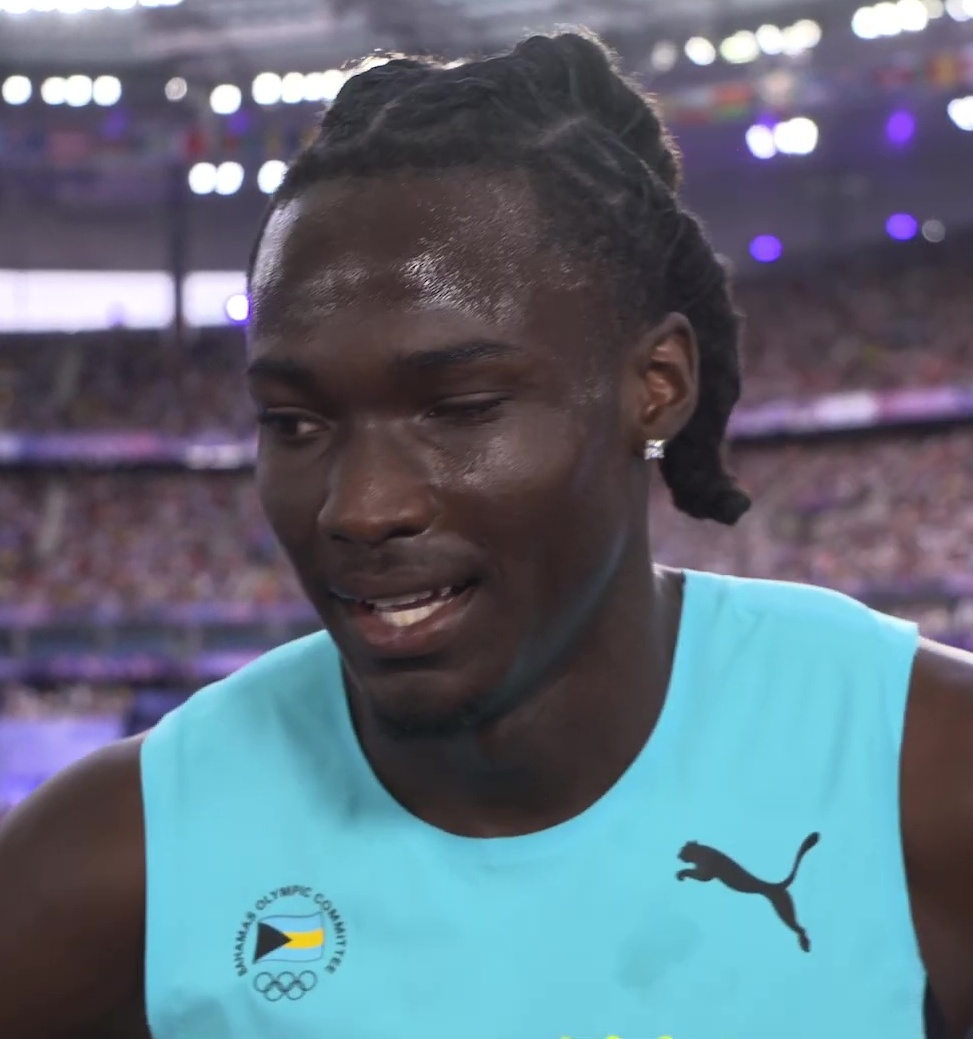

Personal information
- Born: March 29, 2003 (age 23)
Medal record
Athletics
Representing Bahamas
NACAC Championships
Bronze medal – third place	2025 Freeport	4 × 100 m relay
NACAC U-23 Championships
Gold medal – first place	2021 San Jose	200 meters
Gold medal – first place	2021 San Jose	400 meters
Gold medal – first place	2021 San Jose	4 × 100 meters relay

Wanyá McCoy (born 29 March 2003) is a Bahamian sprinter from the Berry Islands.

== Early life and education ==
Born to parents Sandra and Sergio, McCoy is originally from Bullock's Harbour, Berry Islands. He has several siblings, including brother Malachi, who plays basketball. Upon moving to Nassau, McCoy attended Doris Johnson High School and then Queen's College High School. He was initially a basketball player before switching to track. He went on to compete for Clemson University before transferring to University of Florida, where he studies educational science.

== Personal bests ==
Event	Time	Venue	Date
100 m	10.02 (+0.6)	Gainesville, Florida	May 11, 2024
200 m	19.93 (+1.0)	Gainesville, Florida	May 11, 2024
400 m	45.91	Louisville, Kentucky	February 25, 2023
