= 2024 European Athletics Championships – Men's discus throw =

Men's discus throw at the 2024 European Athletics Championships
- Venue: Stadio Olimpico
- Location: Rome
- Dates: 7 June (qualification & final)
- Competitors: 30 from 21 nations
- Winning distance: 68.08

Medalists
gold medal	Kristjan Čeh	Slovenia
silver medal	Lukas Weißhaidinger	Austria
bronze medal	Mykolas Alekna	Lithuania

The men's discus throw at the 2024 European Athletics Championships took place at the Stadio Olimpico on 7 June.

== Records ==
Standing records prior to the 2024 European Athletics Championships
World record	Mykolas Alekna (LTU)	74.35 m	Ramona, Oklahoma, United States	14 April 2024
European record	Mykolas Alekna (LTU)	74.35 m	Ramona, Oklahoma, United States	14 April 2024
Championship record	Mykolas Alekna (LTU)	69.78 m	Munich, Germany	19 August 2022
World Leading	Mykolas Alekna (LTU)	74.35 m	Ramona, Oklahoma, United States	14 April 2024
Europe Leading	Mykolas Alekna (LTU)	74.35 m	Ramona, Oklahoma, United States	14 April 2024

== Schedule ==
Date	Time	Round
7 June 2024	09:35	Qualification
7 June 2024	21:00	Final

All times are local times (UTC+2)

== Results ==
=== Qualification ===
Qualification: 66.00 m (Q) or best 12 performers (q)

Rank	Group	Name	Nationality	#1	#2	#3	Result	Note
1	A	Mykolas Alekna	Lithuania	67.50			67.50	Q
2	B	Kristjan Čeh	Slovenia	65.64			65.64	q
3	A	Henrik Janssen	Germany	64.72	64.74	x	64.74	q
4	A	Lukas Weißhaidinger	Austria	63.99	x	63.86	63.99	q
5	B	Daniel Ståhl	Sweden	59.01	63.79	x	63.79	q
6	A	Lawrence Okoye	Great Britain	62.77	63.62	x	63.62	q
7	A	Clemens Prüfer	Germany	x	x	63.57	63.57	q
8	B	Shaquille Emanuelson	Netherlands	58.98	x	63.36	63.36	q
9	A	Andrius Gudžius	Lithuania	60.55	62.44	63.02	63.02	q
10	B	Oskar Stachnik	Poland	61.07	61.22	62.52	62.52	q
11	A	Apostolos Parellis	Cyprus	59.17	60.23	62.13	62.13	q
12	B	Mika Sosna	Germany	61.08	x	62.07	62.07	q
13	B	Alessio Mannucci	Italy	60.28	x	61.73	61.73	
14	B	Alin Firfirică	Romania	60.24	61.72	60.20	61.72	
15	B	Martin Marković	Croatia	60.43	61.46	60.76	61.46	
16	A	Simon Pettersson	Sweden	x	60.26	61.43	61.43	
17	B	Marek Bárta	Czech Republic	61.12	61.18	61.20	61.20	
18	B	Martynas Alekna	Lithuania	58.17	61.18	60.48	61.18	
19	A	Lolassonn Djouhan	France	60.80	59.98	x	60.80	
20	A	Robert Urbanek	Poland	x	60.75	x	60.75	
21	B	Philip Milanov	Belgium	58.19	59.75	60.49	60.49	
22	A	Yasiel Sotero	Spain	60.37	59.64	x	60.37	
23	B	Diego Casas	Spain	60.25	x	x	60.25	
24	A	Guðni Valur Guðnason	Iceland	x	59.15	x	59.15	
25	B	Tom Reux	France	56.92	56.63	59.06	59.06	
26	A	Ruben Rolvink	Netherlands	58.74	x	55.50	58.74	
27	A	Emanuel Sousa	Portugal	x	58.40	58.72	58.72	
28	B	Róbert Szikszai	Hungary	x	x	58.58	58.58	
29	B	Ola Stunes Isene	Norway	x	x	58.03	58.03	
30	A	Danijel Furtula	Montenegro	57.22	x	57.74	57.74	

=== Final ===
Rank	Name	Nationality	#1	#2	#3	#4	#5	#6	Result	Note
1	Kristjan Čeh	Slovenia	66.59	68.08	x	x	67.93	68.05	68.08	
2	Lukas Weißhaidinger	Austria	65.60	63.07	66.78	63.99	67.70	64.42	67.70	
3	Mykolas Alekna	Lithuania	x	66.98	x	67.48	x	x	67.48	
4	Daniel Ståhl	Sweden	63.02	65.68	66.84	x	x	x	66.84	
5	Henrik Janssen	Germany	65.09	x	x	x	65.48	x	65.48	
6	Clemens Prüfer	Germany	63.54	x	63.08	62.57	64.60	62.42	64.60	
7	Andrius Gudžius	Lithuania	64.35	63.26	64.43	63.72	x	x	64.43	
8	Lawrence Okoye	Great Britain	62.56	62.67	58.76	63.38	62.23	63.48	63.48	
9	Apostolos Parellis	Cyprus	61.53	61.86	62.53				62.53	
10	Oskar Stachnik	Poland	62.35	x	60.84				62.35	
11	Shaquille Emanuelson	Netherlands	61.68	58.02	61.96				61.96	
12	Mika Sosna	Germany	x	59.61	58.44				59.61	
