= 2023 World Athletics Championships – Men's discus throw =

Men's discus throw at the 2023 World Championships
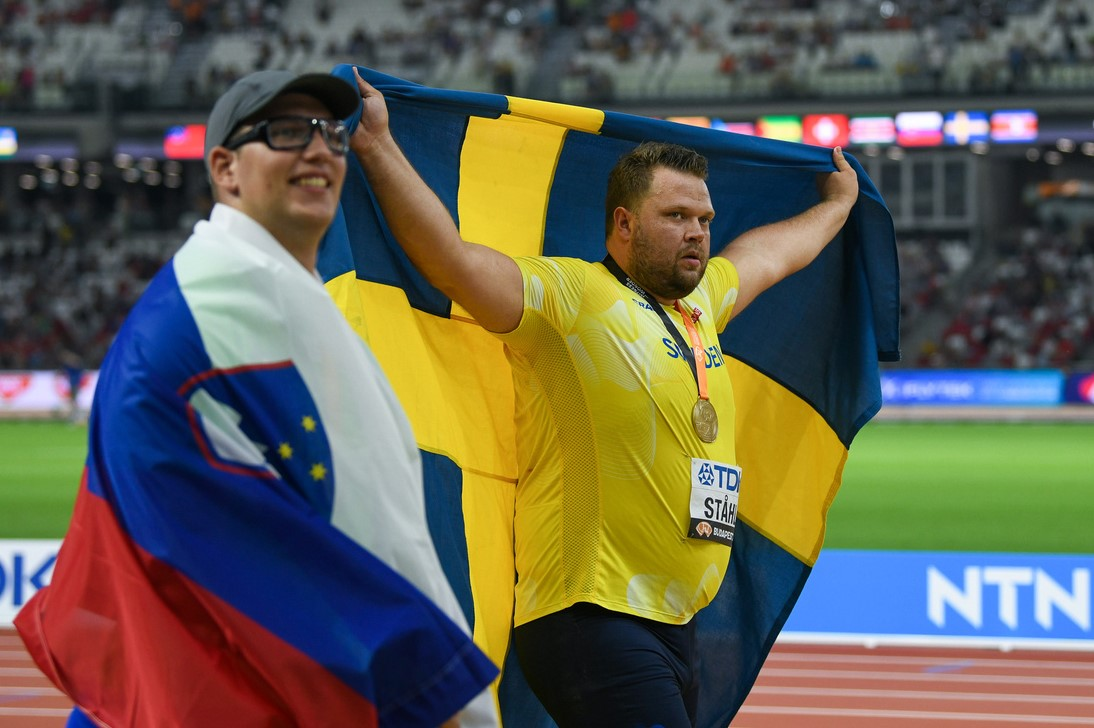
- Kristjan Čeh and Daniel Ståhl shortly after the final.
- Venue: National Athletics Centre
- Dates: 19 August (qualification); 21 August (final)
- Competitors: 35 from 27 nations
- Winning distance: 71.46 CR

Medalists
gold medal	Daniel Ståhl	Sweden
silver medal	Kristjan Čeh	Slovenia
bronze medal	Mykolas Alekna	Lithuania

The men's discus throw at the 2023 World Athletics Championships was held at the National Athletics Centre in Budapest on 19 and 21 August 2023.

== Summary ==
Nobody in the field was able to make the 66.50m automatic qualifier. In the first round of the final, Andrius Gudžius was the first over 65 with a 65.95m. The next thrower was the defending champion Kristjan Čeh. His 68.31m opened up a big lead. Near the end of the round, Matthew Denny moved into second with a 66.39m. In the second round, Gudžius improved to 66.16m, the Čeh made a big improvement in his lead to 69.27m. Daniel Ståhl stepped into second with at 66.58m, then Mykolas Alekna took it from him with 67.08m. In the third round, Fedrick Dacres moved into third with his 66.72m and the field was put into a new order.

In the fourth round, Denny tossed it 68.24m for a new second place. Then Ståhl pushed everybody down a notch by throwing 69.37m. Alekna moved into third with a 68.85m. Nobody improved in the fifth round so the field was reordered again. As the next to last thrower, Čeh finally got into the 70's barely at 70.02m to retake the lead. On the final throw of the competition, Ståhl launched the winner 71.46 m (234 ft 5 in), the #15 throw in history (Ståhl and Čeh already share #6, Alekna's father holds #2). 71.46m became the new Championship Record.

== Records ==
Before the competition records were as follows:

Record	Athlete & Nat.	Perf.	Location	Date
World record	Jürgen Schult (GDR)	74.08 m	Neubrandenburg, East Germany	6 June 1986
Championship record	Kristjan Čeh (SLO)	71.13 m	Eugene, United States	19 Jul 2022
World Leading	Kristjan Čeh (SLO)	71.86 m	Jöhvi, Estonia	16 June 2023
African Record	Frantz Kruger (RSA)	70.32 m	Salon-de-Provence, France	26 May 2002
Asian Record	Ehsan Hadadi (IRI)	69.32 m	Tallinn, Estonia	3 June 2008
North, Central American and Caribbean record	Ben Plucknett (USA)	71.32 m	Eugene, United States	4 June 1983
South American Record	Mauricio Ortega (COL)	70.29 m	Lovelhe, Portugal	22 July 2020
European Record	Jürgen Schult (GDR)	74.08 m	Neubrandenburg, East Germany	6 June 1986
Oceanian record	Alex Rose (SAM)	70.39 m	Ramona, United States	16 April 2023

The following records were set at the competition:

Record	Perf.	Athlete	Nat.	Date
Championship record	71.46	Daniel Ståhl	Sweden	21 Aug 2023

== Qualification standard ==
The standard to qualify automatically for entry was 67.00 m.

== Schedule ==
The event schedule, in local time (UTC+2), was as follows:

Date	Time	Round
19 August	19:09	Qualification
21 August	20:30	Final

== Results ==
=== Qualification ===
Athletes attaining a mark of at least 66.50 metres ( Q ) or at least the 12 best performers ( q ) qualify for the final.

Rank	Group	Name	Nationality	Round			Mark	Notes
Rank	Group	Name	Nationality	1	2	3	Mark	Notes
1	A	Daniel Ståhl	Sweden	64.58	66.25	64.99	66.25	q
2	A	Mykolas Alekna	Lithuania	66.04	x	63.99	66.04	q
3	B	Kristjan Čeh	Slovenia	65.95	65.18	65.29	65.95	q
4	A	Traves Smikle	Jamaica	65.71	64.32	64.30	65.71	q
5	B	Lukas Weißhaidinger	Austria	64.34	65.61	64.20	65.61	q
6	B	Andrius Gudžius	Lithuania	65.50	64.57	63.68	65.50	q
7	B	Fedrick Dacres	Jamaica	x	64.72	65.45	65.45	q
8	B	Alex Rose	Samoa	x	65.26	63.74	65.26	q
9	B	Matthew Denny	Australia	61.70	x	64.29	64.29	q
10	A	Brian Williams	United States	63.85	61.42	61.09	63.85	q, SB
11	A	Henrik Janssen	Germany	61.96	62.97	63.79	63.79	q
12	B	Connor Bell	New Zealand	x	63.72	x	63.72	q
13	A	Lawrence Okoye	Great Britain & N.I.	x	x	63.66	63.66	
14	B	Turner Washington	United States	59.99	63.57	62.87	63.57	
15	A	Sam Mattis	United States	62.55	63.43	60.57	63.43	
16	B	Steven Richter	Germany	63.37	62.13	x	63.37	
17	B	Daniel Jasinski	Germany	62.54	63.36	x	63.36	
18	A	Philip Milanov	Belgium	59.15	63.00	x	63.00	
19	A	Rojé Stona	Jamaica	62.67	x	61.69	62.67	
20	A	Martynas Alekna	Lithuania	58.44	62.57	58.06	62.57	
21	B	Simon Pettersson	Sweden	62.53	x	x	62.53	
22	A	Guðni Valur Guðnason	Iceland	59.97	x	62.28	62.28	
23	B	Claudio Romero	Chile	62.24	61.60	x	62.24	
24	A	Apostolos Parellis	Cyprus	61.94	62.10	60.86	62.10	SB
25	B	Oskar Stachnik	Poland	60.93	61.96	61.89	61.96	
26	A	Martin Marković	Croatia	x	61.88	61.37	61.88	
27	A	Victor Hogan	South Africa	60.09	61.80	x	61.80	
28	A	Robert Urbanek	Poland	61.20	61.30	x	61.30	
29	A	Alin Firfirică	Romania	x	61.03	x	61.03	
30	B	Róbert Szikszai	Hungary	60.64	x	x	60.64	
31	A	Moaaz Mohamed Ibrahim	Qatar	60.40	57.81	60.11	60.40	
32	A	Lucas Nervi	Chile	58.76	57.31	58.66	58.76	
33	B	Mario Díaz	Cuba	56.59	56.75	58.03	58.03	
34	B	Yasiel Sotero	Spain	55.39	55.89	53.88	55.89	
35	B	Juan José Caicedo	Ecuador	x	x	55.78	55.78	

=== Final ===
Results:

Rank	Name	Nationality	Round						Mark	Notes
Rank	Name	Nationality	1	2	3	4	5	6	Mark	Notes
1st place, gold medalist(s)	Daniel Ståhl	Sweden	63.01	66.58	x	69.37	67.56	71.46	71.46	CR
2nd place, silver medalist(s)	Kristjan Čeh	Slovenia	68.31	69.27	x	67.89	66.69	70.02	70.02	
3rd place, bronze medalist(s)	Mykolas Alekna	Lithuania	65.23	67.08	64.37	68.85	68.07	68.07	68.85	
4	Matthew Denny	Australia	66.39	x	x	68.24	x	65.92	68.24	NR
5	Fedrick Dacres	Jamaica	65.74	64.60	66.72	x	63.89	x	66.72	
6	Andrius Gudžius	Lithuania	65.95	66.16	x	x	63.98	66.13	66.16	
7	Lukas Weißhaidinger	Austria	63.57	65.19	62.85	65.20	65.54	x	65.54	
8	Henrik Janssen	Germany	62.97	63.80	63.77	x	x	62.27	63.80	
9	Brian Williams	United States	62.68	63.62	x				63.62	
10	Connor Bell	New Zealand	63.23	x	62.21				63.23	
11	Traves Smikle	Jamaica	x	61.90	x				61.90	
12	Alex Rose	Samoa	x	x	61.69				61.69	
