= 2025 World Athletics Championships – Men's discus throw =

Men's discus throw at the 2025 World Athletics Championships
- Venue: National Stadium
- Location: Tokyo, Japan
- Dates: 20 September (qualification); 21 September (final)
- Winning distance: 70.47 m SB

Medalists
gold medal	Daniel Ståhl	Sweden
silver medal	Mykolas Alekna	Lithuania
bronze medal	Alex Rose	Samoa

The men's discus throw at the 2025 World Athletics Championships was held at the National Stadium in Tokyo on 20 and 21 September 2025. Because of heavy rain in Tokyo, the final was delayed for several hours and became the championship's last event.

== Summary ==
Thirty-seven athletes entered the competition, including defending champion Daniel Ståhl, world record holder Mykolas Alekna, 2022 champion Kristjan Čeh, and world number 2 Matthew Denny. Olympic champion Rojé Stona was a notable absence, as he had recently changed his sporting nationality to Turkey.

In the qualifying round, the automatic qualification mark of 66.50 m (218 ft 2 in) was reached by three of the pre-event favourites, as well as Martynas Alekna, his brother Mykolas was amongst the eight other finalists.

The final, scheduled just after 8 pm local time, ended up becoming the final event of the championship due to rain suspending competition and threatening to cancel it entirely. On only the second throw of the night, Denny slipped and fell in the wet ring. Proceedings were brought to a halt, and eventually the competition was restarted. The competition eventually restarted after the conclusion of the closing ceremony hours later. After the restart, Mykolas Alekna's first round result stood, while Denny was allowed to retake his failed throw. The rain continued to fall however, resulting in unusual behaviour by the competitors such as Miká Sosna wearing only socks for one of his throws, as the throwers attempted to find grip. Conditions improved and degraded as the competition wore on, with 50% of throws fouled and only three throwers exceeding their qualifying marks.

After four rounds of competition, eight competitors qualified for the final two rounds. Fouls from Martynas Alekna and Čeh guaranteed 6th place for Andrius Gudžius, who forfeited his final two throws. This left just Cuban Mario Díaz and Samoan Alex Rose to try and best Mykolas Alekna, Ståhl, and Denny, who held the medal placings. Mykolas Alekna's second-round throw of 67.84 m (222 ft 6 in) was the longest throw at that point. With a surprising fifth-round throw of 66.96 m (219 ft 8 in), Rose managed to unseat Denny for the bronze-medal position, and two fouls from Denny in the wet weather ensured Samoa's first world championship medal. After Rose fouled his final throw, Ståhl threw the first throw of the night over 70 meters, 70.47 m (231 ft 2 in) which after a foul from Alekna, was enough to claim gold.

== Records ==
Before the competition, records were as follows:

Record	Athlete & Nat.	Perf.	Location	Date
World record	Mykolas Alekna (LTU)	75.56 m	Ramona, United States	13 April 2025
Championship record	Daniel Ståhl (SWE)	71.46 m	Budapest, Hungary	21 August 2023
World Leading	Mykolas Alekna (LTU)	75.56 m	Ramona, United States	13 April 2025
African Record	Frantz Kruger (RSA)	70.32 m	Salon-de-Provence, France	26 May 2002
Asian Record	Ehsan Hadadi (IRI)	69.32 m	Tallinn, Estonia	3 June 2008
European Record	Mykolas Alekna (LTU)	75.56 m	Ramona, United States	13 April 2025
North, Central American and Caribbean record	Ralford Mullings (JAM)	72.01 m	Ramona, United States	16 August 2025
Oceanian record	Matthew Denny (AUS)	74.78 m	Ramona, United States	13 April 2025
South American Record	Mauricio Ortega (COL)	70.29 m	Lovelhe, Portugal	22 July 2020

== Qualification standard ==
The standard to qualify automatically for the world championships was 67.50 m.

== Schedule ==
The event schedule, in local time (UTC+9), was as follows:

Date	Time	Round
20 September	09:00	Qualification
21 September	20:10	Final

== Results ==
=== Qualification ===
All athletes over 66.50 metres (218.2 ft) (Q) or at least the 12 best performers (q) advanced to the final. Fouls are denoted by "x".

==== Group A ====
Place	Athlete	Nation	Round			Mark	Notes
Place	Athlete	Nation	#1	#2	#3	Mark	Notes
1	Daniel Ståhl	Sweden	69.90			69.90 m	Q
2	Martynas Alekna	Lithuania	67.16			67.16 m	Q, SB
3	Lukas Weißhaidinger	Austria	65.72	65.91	x	65.91 m	q
4	Mykolas Alekna	Lithuania	65.39	x	65.29	65.39 m	q
5	Alex Rose	Samoa	63.67	65.13	62.63	65.13 m	q
6	Mika Sosna	Germany	64.65	64.99	x	64.99 m	q
7	Steven Richter	Germany	x	63.56	64.06	64.06 m	
8	Reginald Jagers III	United States	63.59	62.74	61.45	63.59 m	
9	Abuduaini Tuergong	China	61.38	61.29	63.34	63.34 m	
10	Chad Wright	Jamaica	62.73	62.87	62.67	62.87 m	
11	Sam Mattis	United States	61.99	53.48	62.86	62.86 m	
12	Diego Casas	Spain	60.81	61.92	62.54	62.54 m	
13	Shaquille Emanuelson	Netherlands	62.04	60.05	59.96	62.04 m	
14	Victor Hogan	South Africa	61.51	x	60.37	61.51 m	
15	Alin Firfirică	Romania	57.59	58.67	60.78	60.78 m	
16	Nicholas Percy	Great Britain & N.I.	57.08	55.94	56.86	57.08 m	
17	Ralford Mullings	Jamaica	x	56.82	x	56.82 m	
18	Jordan Guehaseim	France	56.64	x	55.18	56.64 m	
19	Masateru Yugami	Japan	53.75	56.40	56.23	56.40 m	

==== Group B ====
Place	Athlete	Nation	Round			Mark	Notes
Place	Athlete	Nation	#1	#2	#3	Mark	Notes
1	Kristjan Čeh	Slovenia	68.08			68.08 m	Q
2	Matthew Denny	Australia	66.63			66.63 m	Q
3	Henrik Janssen	Germany	62.76	66.47	x	66.47 m	q
4	Mario Díaz	Cuba	63.66	63.43	65.66	65.66 m	q
5	Andrius Gudžius	Lithuania	65.18	x	65.05	65.18 m	q
6	Connor Bell	New Zealand	65.09	62.67	65.03	65.09 m	q
7	Lawrence Okoye	Great Britain & N.I.	63.50	63.29	x	63.50 m	
8	Ruben Rolvink	Netherlands	61.96	x	63.28	63.28 m	
9	Lolassonn Djouhan	France	63.13	62.55	62.84	63.13 m	
10	Dimitrios Pavlidis	Greece	60.17	62.49	60.78	62.49 m	
11	Juan José Caicedo	Ecuador	x	60.94	x	60.94 m	
12	Mauricio Ortega	Colombia	60.57	x	x	60.57 m	
13	Fedrick Dacres	Jamaica	x	x	60.54	60.54 m	
14	Claudio Romero	Chile	60.48	x	60.32	60.48 m	
15	Wellinton da Cruz Filho	Brazil	x	x	59.16	59.16 m	
16	Marcus Gustaveson	United States	x	59.12	x	59.12 m	
17	Marek Bárta	Czech Republic	x	57.60	56.67	57.60 m	
18	Emanuel Sousa	Portugal	x	x	56.97	56.97 m	

=== Final ===
Place	Athlete	Nation	Round						Mark	Notes
Place	Athlete	Nation	#1	#2	#3	#4	#5	#6	Mark	Notes
1st place, gold medalist(s)	Daniel Ståhl	Sweden	x	63.74	65.60	67.47	66.97	70.47	70.47m	SB
2nd place, silver medalist(s)	Mykolas Alekna	Lithuania	62.91	67.84	66.00	x	64.57	x	67.84m	
3rd place, bronze medalist(s)	Alex Rose	Samoa	57.93	64.63	x	x	66.96	x	66.96m	
4	Matthew Denny	Australia	59.09	63.18	65.57	65.23	x	x	65.57m	
5	Mario Díaz	Cuba	x	64.71	59.95	61.61	63.16	63.32	64.71m	
6	Andrius Gudžius	Lithuania	x	63.43	x	x	r		63.43m	
7	Martynas Alekna	Lithuania	63.05	63.34	x	62.47	x		63.34m	
8	Kristjan Čeh	Slovenia	55.18	x	63.07	x	x		63.07m	
9	Lukas Weißhaidinger	Austria	62.26	x	x	x			62.26m	
10	Connor Bell	New Zealand	54.73	59.46	x	59.97			59.97m	
11	Mika Sosna	Germany	x	58.60	x				58.60m	
—	Henrik Janssen	Germany	x	x	x				NM	
