= 2021 European Athletics U23 Championships – Men's discus throw =

Men's discus throw at the 2021 European Athletics U23 Championships
- Venue: Kadriorg Stadium, Tallinn
- Dates: 8 and 10 July
- Competitors: 27 from 20 nations
- Winning distance: 67.48

Medalists
gold medal	Kristjan Čeh	Slovenia
silver medal	Yauheni Bahutski	Belarus
bronze medal	Yasiel Sotero	Spain

The men's discus throw event at the 2021 European Athletics U23 Championships was held in Tallinn, Estonia, at Kadriorg Stadium on 8 and 10 July.

== Records ==
Prior to the competition, the records were as follows:

European U23 record	Kristjan Čeh (SLO)	69.52	Ptuj, Slovenia	27 May 2021
Championship U23 record	Robert Harting (GER)	64.50	Erfurt, Germany	16 July 2005

== Results ==
=== Qualification ===
Qualification rule: 59.00 (Q) or the 12 best results (q) qualified for the final.

Rank	Group	Name	Nationality	#1	#2	#3	Results	Notes
1	A	Kristjan Čeh	Slovenia	x	65.59		65.59	Q, CR
2	B	Yauheni Bahutski	Belarus	x	62.77		62.77	Q
3	B	Yasiel Sotero	Spain	58.78	x	59.86	59.86	Q
4	A	Korbinian Häßler	Germany	55.81	57.71	x	57.71	q
5	A	Giorgos Koniarakis	Cyprus	57.36	x	x	57.36	q
6	B	Emanuel Sousa	Portugal	55.25	57.31	x	57.31	q
7	B	Martynas Alekna	Lithuania	x	57.16	x	57.16	q
8	B	Osman Kul	Turkey	56.67	55.97	56.66	56.67	q, PB
9	A	Michal Forejt	Czech Republic	55.77	54.94	56.39	56.39	q
10	A	Oleksiy Kyrylin	Ukraine	49.17	54.61	56.19	56.19	q
11	B	Enrico Saccomano	Italy	54.65	52.50	55.67	55.67	q
12	B	Aleks Hristov	Bulgaria	53.74	53.98	54.59	54.59	q
13	B	Mimir Sigurðsson	Iceland	54.54	54.20	x	54.54	
14	A	Jakub Lewoszewski	Poland	54.13	54.28	52.31	54.28	
15	A	Armandas Miliauskas	Lithuania	54.02	x	54.05	54.05	
16	B	Petr Procházka	Czech Republic	53.84	x	x	53.84	
17	B	Fabian Weinberg	Norway	40.02	53.09	53.50	53.50	
18	B	Kevin Sakson	Estonia	x	51.16	53.44	53.44	
19	A	Jakub Forejt	Czech Republic	50.86	52.96	53.35	53.35	
20	A	Samuel Kovač	Slovakia	52.96	x	48.43	52.96	
21	B	Lukas Hamrin	Sweden	51.57	52.91	52.90	52.91	
22	B	Casper Jørgensen	Denmark	49.30	x	52.82	52.82	
23	B	Robin Vrbek	Slovenia	x	51.43	x	51.43	
24	A	Diego Casas	Spain	46.34	x	51.39	51.39	
25	A	Fatih Alpaslan	Turkey	49.58	x	49.28	49.58	
	A	Carmelo Alessandro Musci	Italy	x	x	x	NM	
	A	Tom Reux	France	x	x	x	NM	

=== Final ===
Rank	Name	Nationality	#1	#2	#3	#4	#5	#6	Result	Notes
1st place, gold medalist(s)	Kristjan Čeh	Slovenia	65.20	x	67.48	x	x	66.86	67.48	CR
2nd place, silver medalist(s)	Yauheni Bahutski	Belarus	x	59.28	x	61.21	x	x	61.21	
3rd place, bronze medalist(s)	Yasiel Sotero	Spain	x	58.07	57.87	56.25	x	x	58.07	
4	Korbinian Häßler	Germany	51.65	56.33	57.95	57.80	x	56.88	57.95	
5	Emanuel Sousa	Portugal	54.79	57.57	x	56.99	x	57.72	57.72	
6	Enrico Saccomano	Italy	51.46	57.36	x	52.12	x	55.01	57.36	
7	Martynas Alekna	Lithuania	56.84	53.68	54.56	53.19	57.25	x	57.25	
8	Michal Forejt	Czech Republic	53.88	56.30	54.03	x	55.38	x	56.30	
9	Giorgos Koniarakis	Cyprus	55.26	55.33	56.01				56.01	
10	Oleksiy Kyrylin	Ukraine	x	55.34	55.53				55.53	
11	Aleks Hristov	Bulgaria	54.07	54.62	51.62				54.62	
12	Osman Kul	Turkey	52.92	53.04	x				53.04	
