= 2022 World Athletics Championships – Men's discus throw =

Men's discus throw at the 2022 World Championships
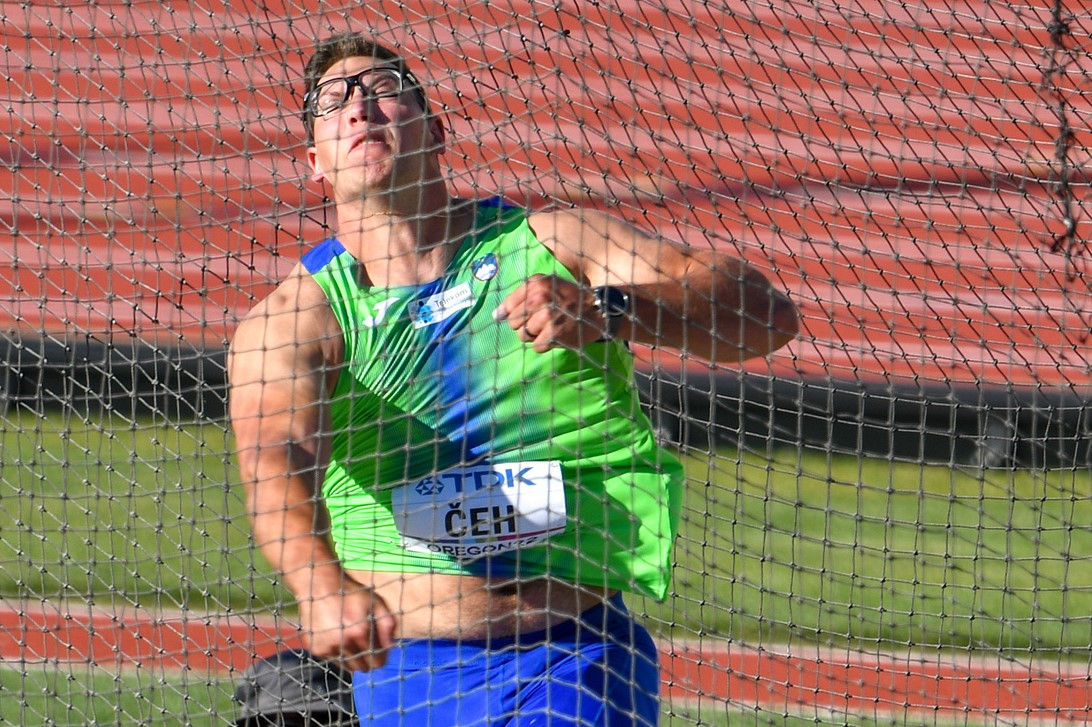
- Kristjan Čeh during the final.
- Venue: Hayward Field
- Dates: 17 July (qualification); 19 July (final)
- Competitors: 31 from 20 nations
- Winning distance: 71.13

Medalists
gold medal	Kristjan Čeh	Slovenia
silver medal	Mykolas Alekna	Lithuania
bronze medal	Andrius Gudžius	Lithuania

The men's discus throw at the 2022 World Athletics Championships was held at the Hayward Field in Eugene on 17 and 19 July 2022.

== Records ==
Before the competition records were as follows:

Record	Athlete & Nat.	Perf.	Location	Date
World record	Jürgen Schult (GDR)	74.08 m	Neubrandenburg, East Germany	6 June 1986
Championship record	Virgilijus Alekna (LTU)	70.17 m	Helsinki, Finland	7 August 2005
World Leading	Daniel Ståhl (SWE)	71.47 m	Uppsala, Sweden	21 June 2022
African Record	Frantz Kruger (RSA)	70.32 m	Salon-de-Provence, France	26 May 2002
Asian Record	Ehsan Hadadi (IRI)	69.32 m	Tallinn, Estonia	3 June 2008
North, Central American and Caribbean record	Ben Plucknett (USA)	71.32 m	Eugene, United States	4 June 1983
South American Record	Mauricio Ortega (COL)	70.29 m	Lovelhe, Portugal	22 July 2020
European Record	Jürgen Schult (GDR)	74.08 m	Neubrandenburg, East Germany	6 June 1986
Oceanian record	Benn Harradine (AUS)	68.20 m	Townsville, Australia	10 May 2013

The following records were set at the competition:

Record	Perf.	Athlete	Nat.	Date
Championship record	71.13	Kristjan Čeh	Slovenia	19 Jul 2022

== Qualification standard ==
The standard to qualify automatically for entry was 66.00 m.

== Schedule ==
The event schedule, in local time (UTC−7), was as follows:

Date	Time	Round
17 July	17:05	Qualification
19 July	18:33	Final

== Results ==
=== Qualification ===
Qualification: Qualifying Performance 66.00 (Q) or at least 12 best performers (q) advanced to the final.

Rank	Group	Name	Nationality	Round			Mark	Notes
Rank	Group	Name	Nationality	1	2	3	Mark	Notes
1	A	Mykolas Alekna	Lithuania	65.78	68.91		68.91	Q
2	A	Kristjan Čeh	Slovenia	68.23			68.23	Q
3	A	Simon Pettersson	Sweden	63.71	68.11		68.11	Q, SB
4	A	Matthew Denny	Australia	64.89	66.98		66.98	Q
5	B	Andrius Gudžius	Lithuania	64.21	66.60		66.60	Q
6	B	Lukas Weißhaidinger	Austria	66.51			66.51	Q
7	B	Daniel Ståhl	Sweden	x	65.95	x	65.95	q
8	A	Sam Mattis	United States	61.87	65.59	62.30	65.59	q
9	A	Alin Firfirică	Romania	59.48	64.14	65.54	65.54	q, SB
10	B	Fedrick Dacres	Jamaica	58.87	63.36	64.49	64.49	q
11	A	Traves Smikle	Jamaica	64.21	63.16	x	64.21	q
12	A	Alex Rose	Samoa	63.11	64.14	63.97	64.14	q
13	A	Lawrence Okoye	Great Britain & N.I.	63.57	x	59.89	63.57	
14	B	Nicholas Percy	Great Britain & N.I.	58.30	62.90	63.20	63.20	
15	A	Marek Bárta	Czech Republic	62.90	61.58	56.68	62.90	
16	A	Apostolos Parellis	Cyprus	62.46	61.32	61.27	62.46	
17	B	Martin Wierig	Germany	60.52	60.86	62.28	62.28	
18	B	Andrew Evans	United States	59.31	62.20	62.18	62.20	
19	B	Henrik Janssen	Germany	61.85	60.30	60.36	61.85	
20	B	Claudio Romero	Chile	61.69	x	x	61.69	
21	B	Philip Milanov	Belgium	x	61.22	61.47	61.47	
22	B	Mario Díaz	Cuba	57.72	58.35	60.83	60.83	
23	B	Martin Marković	Croatia	x	57.74	60.59	60.59	
24	B	Victor Hogan	South Africa	60.51	x	59.83	60.51	
25	A	Chad Wright	Jamaica	59.14	x	60.31	60.31	
26	B	Mauricio Ortega	Colombia	59.47	x	59.91	59.91	
27	A	Werner Visser	South Africa	58.44	x	x	58.44	
28	B	Brian Williams	United States	x	56.40	58.25	58.25	
29	A	Torben Brandt	Germany	54.11	53.42	x	54.11	
	B	Lucas Nervi	Chile	x	x	x	NM	

=== Final ===
The final will take place on 19 July at 18:36.

Rank	Name	Nationality	Round						Mark	Notes
Rank	Name	Nationality	1	2	3	4	5	6	Mark	Notes
1st place, gold medalist(s)	Kristjan Čeh	Slovenia	65.27	69.02	71.13	68.95	70.51	67.57	71.13	CR
2nd place, silver medalist(s)	Mykolas Alekna	Lithuania	66.64	67.87	67.28	69.27	x	x	69.27	
3rd place, bronze medalist(s)	Andrius Gudžius	Lithuania	67.31	66.06	x	67.55	x	x	67.55	
4	Daniel Ståhl	Sweden	66.59	65.99	x	65.39	67.10	66.86	67.10	
5	Simon Pettersson	Sweden	x	67.00	x	x	x	x	67.00	
6	Matthew Denny	Australia	61.55	65.50	66.29	65.56	65.49	66.47	66.47	
7	Alin Firfirică	Romania	65.10	63.80	62.58	x	x	65.57	65.57	SB
8	Alex Rose	Samoa	65.57	64.17	63.41	62.78	x	61.16	65.57	
9	Fedrick Dacres	Jamaica	64.85	63.25	64.79				64.85	
10	Lukas Weißhaidinger	Austria	61.72	63.98	62.45				63.98	
11	Sam Mattis	United States	60.89	63.19	62.82				63.19	
12	Traves Smikle	Jamaica	x	62.23	x				62.23	
