= 2026 European Athletics Championships – Men's discus throw =

Men's discus throw at the 2026 European Athletics Championships
- Venue: Alexander Stadium
- Location: Birmingham, United Kingdom
- Dates: 11 August 2026 (qualification) 13 August 2026 (final)
- Competitors: 30 (target)
- Winning distance: 72.51 m

Medalists
gold medal	Kristjan Čeh	Slovenia
silver medal	Mykolas Alekna	Lithuania
bronze medal	Henrik Janssen	Germany

The men's discus throw at the 2026 European Athletics Championships took place over two rounds at the Alexander Stadium in Birmingham, United Kingdom, on 11 and 13 August 2026.

== Background ==
Records before the 2026 European Athletics Championships
Record	Athlete (nation)	Distance	Location	Date
World record	Mykolas Alekna (LIT)	75.56 m	Ramona, United States	13 April 2025
European record	Mykolas Alekna (LIT)	75.56 m	Ramona, United States	13 April 2025
Championship record	Mykolas Alekna (LIT)	69.78 m	Munich, Germany	19 August 2022
World leading	Matthew Denny (AUS)	74.04 m	Ramona, United States	9 April 2026
European leading	Steven Richter (GER)	74.00 m	Ramona, United States	9 April 2026

== Qualification ==
For the men's discus throw, the qualification period was from 27 July 2025 to 26 July 2026. Athletes qualified by achieving the entry standard of 65.60 m or better, by wildcard for the 2024 European Athletics Champion, or by their position on the World Athletics Rankings for the event. The target number was 30 athletes.

Qualification standings per 31 July 2026
QP	CP	Country	Athlete	Status	Details
1	1	Slovenia	Kristjan Čeh	Qualified by Wild Card	Defending European Champion
2	1	Germany	Steven Richter	Qualified by Entry Standard	74.00 - Millican Field at Throw Town, Ramona, OK (USA) - 09 APR 2026
3	1	Lithuania	Mykolas Alekna	Qualified by Entry Standard	72.65 - Palangos Stadionas, Palanga (LTU) - 25 JUL 2026
4	1	Great Britain & N.I.	Lawrence Okoye	Qualified by Entry Standard	71.88 - Millican Field at Throw Town, Ramona, OK (USA) - 11 APR 2026
5	1	Netherlands	Ruben Rolvink	Qualified by Entry Standard	71.22 - Millican Field at Throw Town, Ramona, OK (USA) - 31 MAY 2026
6	1	Sweden	Daniel Ståhl	Qualified by Entry Standard	70.47 - National Stadium, Tokyo (JPN) - 21 SEP 2025
7	2	Germany	Marius Karges	Qualified by Entry Standard	69.47 - Millican Field at Throw Town, Ramona, OK (USA) - 12 APR 2026
8	3	Germany	Henrik Janssen	Qualified by Entry Standard	68.54 - Bungertstadion, Rehlingen (GER) - 24 MAY 2026
9	2	Netherlands	Shaquille Emanuelson	Qualified by Entry Standard	68.14 - Millican Field at Throw Town, Ramona, OK (USA) - 14 JUN 2026
10	2	Lithuania	Andrius Gudžius	Qualified by Entry Standard	67.73 - Palangos Stadionas, Palanga (LTU) - 06 JUN 2026
11	1	France	Lolassonn Djouhan	Qualified by Entry Standard	67.52 - Complexe Sportif D'olembe, Yaoundé (CMR) - 31 MAY 2026
reserve	4	Germany	Miká Sosna	Qualified by Entry Standard	67.24 - Heinz-Steyer-Stadion, Dresden (GER) - 03 AUG 2025
12	3	Lithuania	Martynas Alekna	Qualified by Entry Standard	67.16 - National Stadium, Tokyo (JPN) - 20 SEP 2025
13	1	Austria	Lukas Weißhaidinger	Qualified by Entry Standard	67.00 - Rudolf Tonn Stadion, Schwechat (AUT) - 09 MAY 2026
14	1	Norway	Ola Stunes Isene	Qualified by Entry Standard	66.29 - Millican Field at Throw Town, Ramona, OK (USA) - 25 APR 2026
15	1	Romania	Alin Alexandru Firfirică	Qualified by Entry Standard	65.95 - GPS Stadium, Nicosia (CYP) - 14 MAR 2026
16	1	Spain	Diego Casas	Qualified by Entry Standard	65.95 - Pistes d'atletisme Gaetà Huguet, Castellón (ESP) - 01 JUL 2026
17	1	Greece	Dimitrios Pavlidis	Qualified by World Rankings	18th - 1164 points
18	1	Portugal	Emanuel Sousa	Qualified by World Rankings	20th - 1149 points
19	1	Poland	Damian Rodziak	Qualified by World Rankings	21st - 1144 points
20	1	Italy	Enrico Saccomano	Qualified by World Rankings	23rd - 1128 points
21	1	Iceland	Guðni Valur Guðnason	Qualified by World Rankings	24th - 1127 points
22	1	Turkey	Ömer Şahin	Qualified by World Rankings	25th - 1127 points
23	1	Hungary	Róbert Szikszai	Qualified by World Rankings	27th - 1122 points
24	1	Czech Republic	Marek Bárta	Qualified by World Rankings	28th - 1119 points
25	2	Italy	Alessio Mannucci	Qualified by World Rankings	29th - 1111 points
26	2	Sweden	Jesper Ahlin	Qualified by World Rankings	30th - 1108 points
27	2	Austria	Will Dibo	Qualified by World Rankings	31st - 1107 points
28	3	Italy	Carmelo Alessandro Musci	Qualified by World Rankings	32nd - 1101 points
29	1	Finland	Mico Lampinen	Qualified by World Rankings	36th - 1092 points
30	2	Hungary	János Huszák	Qualified by World Rankings	37th - 1091 points
reserve	1	Cyprus	Iosif Michalis Papa	Next best by World Rankings	38th - 1083 points
reserve	3	Sweden	Wictor Petersson	Next best by World Rankings	39th - 1080 points
reserve	3	Hungary	Zsombor Dobó	Next best by World Rankings	46th - 1063 points
reserve	1	Bulgaria	Deyan Gemizhv	Next best by World Rankings	55th - 1042 points

Bye to semi-finals	Reserve activated	Withdrawal / reserve unused

== Schedule ==
Date	Time	Round
11 August 2026	10:35	Qualification.
13 August 2026	20:45	Final

All times are local times (UTC+1)

== Results ==
=== Qualification ===
The qualification round was held on 11 August 2026, at 10:35 in the morning. All athletes meeting the Qualification Standard (Q) of 66.00 m or at least 12 best performers (q) advanced to the final.

==== Group A ====
Place	Athlete	Nation	Round			Result	Notes
Place	Athlete	Nation	#1	#2	#3	Result	Notes
1	Daniel Ståhl	Sweden	63.95	x	x	63.95 m	q
2	Lolassonn Djouhan	France	x	x	63.10	63.10 m	q
3	Diego Casas	Spain	59.06	62.90	58.34	62.90 m	q
4	Andrius Gudžius	Lithuania	x	60.48	62.54	62.54 m	q
5	Martynas Alekna	Lithuania	62.29	x	59.87	62.29 m	q
6	Ruben Rolvink	Netherlands	62.19	60.99	60.18	62.19 m	q
7	Steven Richter	Germany	62.02	x	x	62.02 m	
8	Alessio Mannucci	Italy	59.52	59.33	56.55	59.52 m	
9	Carmelo Musci	Italy	53.92	58.35	x	58.35 m	
10	Ömer Şahin	Turkey	55.75	57.74	55.88	57.74 m	
11	Marek Bárta	Czech Republic	54.46	56.20	57.35	57.35 m	
12	Ola Stunes Isene	Norway	x	56.63	x	56.63 m	
13	Mico Lampinen	Finland	53.83	56.47	56.44	56.47 m	
14	Róbert Szikszai	Hungary	x	53.53	55.54	55.54 m	
15	Will Dibo	Austria	53.72	54.12	55.31	55.31 m	

==== Group B ====
Place	Athlete	Nation	Round			Result	Notes
Place	Athlete	Nation	#1	#2	#3	Result	Notes
1	Mykolas Alekna	Lithuania	67.74			67.74 m	Q
2	Kristjan Čeh	Slovenia	67.52			67.52 m	Q
3	Henrik Janssen	Germany	64.56	x	65.42	65.42 m	q
4	Lukas Weißhaidinger	Austria	65.06	−	−	65.06 m	q
5	Dimitrios Pavlidis	Greece	59.46	63.14	x	63.14 m	q
6	Shaquille Emanuelson	Netherlands	58.16	62.24	60.67	62.24 m	q
7	Alin Alexandru Firfirică	Romania	61.85	61.34	60.64	61.85 m	
8	Marius Karges	Germany	x	60.73	58.91	60.73 m	
9	Damian Rodziak	Poland	59.92	x	x	59.92 m	
10	Emanuel Sousa	Portugal	x	57.13	58.01	58.01 m	
11	Guðni Valur Guðnason	Iceland	x	57.79	x	57.79 m	
12	Jesper Ahlin	Sweden	56.19	54.74	x	56.19 m	
13	Enrico Saccomano	Italy	55.28	x	x	55.28 m	
14	János Huszák	Hungary	52.08	54.95	53.00	54.95 m	

=== Final ===
The final was held on 13 August 2026, at 20:45 in the evening.

Place	Athlete	Nation	Round						Result	Notes
Place	Athlete	Nation	#1	#2	#3	#4	#5	#6	Result	Notes
1st place, gold medalist(s)	Kristjan Čeh	Slovenia	70.83	70.13	72.51	68.92	69.29	70.68	72.51 m	CR
2nd place, silver medalist(s)	Mykolas Alekna	Lithuania	69.89	68.40	x	x	x	69.23	69.89 m	
3rd place, bronze medalist(s)	Henrik Janssen	Germany	69.08	69.53	67.40	67.29	66.29	66.39	69.53 m	SB
4	Daniel Ståhl	Sweden	67.68	67.40	64.75	68.22	x	x	68.22 m	
5	Shaquille Emanuelson	Netherlands	64.48	67.80	x	65.71	67.97	x	67.97 m	
6	Diego Casas	Spain	65.64	x	65.54	x	61.82	65.26	65.64 m	
7	Ruben Rolvink	Netherlands	65.45	62.55	62.35	60.69	64.47	x	65.45 m	
8	Dimitrios Pavlidis	Greece	62.45	64.34	62.33	61.55	61.52	x	64.34 m	SB
9	Andrius Gudžius	Lithuania	63.37	63.99	62.77				63.99 m	
10	Lukas Weißhaidinger	Austria	63.80	x	x				63.80 m	
11	Lolassonn Djouhan	France	58.35	x	62.28				62.28 m	
12	Martynas Alekna	Lithuania	59.56	61.78	60.35				61.78 m	
