= 2023 European Athletics U23 Championships – Men's discus throw =

Men's discus throw at the 2023 European Athletics U23 Championships
- Venue: Leppävaara Stadium
- Location: Espoo, Finland
- Dates: 13 July (qualification); 15 July (final)
- Competitors: 24 from 15 nations
- Winning distance: 68.34 m

Medalists
gold medal	Mykolas Alekna	Lithuania
silver medal	Marius Karges	Germany
bronze medal	Yasiel Sotero	Spain

The men's discus throw event at the 2023 European Athletics U23 Championships was held in Espoo, Finland, at Leppävaara Stadium on 13 and 15 July.

== Records ==
Prior to the competition, the records were as follows:

European U23 record	Mykolas Alekna (LTU)	71.00 m	Berkeley, United States	29 April 2023
Championship U23 record	Kristjan Čeh (SLO)	67.48 m	Tallinn, Estonia	10 July 2021

== Results ==
=== Qualification ===
Qualification rules: All athletes over 58.50 m (Q) or at least 12 best (q) will advance to the final

Rank	Group	Name	Nationality	#1	#2	#3	Mark	Notes
1	A	Mykolas Alekna	Lithuania	55.65	61.42		61.42	Q
2	A	Yasiel Sotero	Spain	59.85			59.85	Q
3	B	Steven Richter	Germany	59.52			59.52	Q
4	A	Marius Karges	Germany	59.32			59.32	Q
5	B	Enes Çankaya	Turkey	x	56.04	x	56.04	q
6	A	Carmelo Alessandro Musci	Italy	55.13	51.20	53.28	55.13	q
7	B	Marcos Moreno	Spain	41.82	54.67	54.16	54.67	q
8	A	Antti Pränni	Finland	53.24	53.58	54.01	54.01	q
9	A	Sebastiaan Bonte	Netherlands	53.67	51.96	51.46	53.67	q
10	B	Rami Kankaanpää	Finland	53.48	x	53.41	53.48	q
11	A	Konstantinos Bouzakis	Greece	51.24	x	53.44	53.44	q
12	B	Marc-Alexandre Delin	France	x	x	53.14	53.14	q
13	B	Dimitrios Pavlidis	Greece	51.83	52.81	53.05	53.05	
14	B	Will Dibo	Austria	x	51.44	52.88	52.88	
15	A	Chukwuemeka Osammor	Great Britain	52.52	51.53	x	52.52	
16	A	Márton Csontos	Hungary	51.54	52.28	51.86	52.28	
17	B	Steffen Melheim	Norway	x	x	51.81	51.81	
18	A	Oleksii Kyrylin	Ukraine	51.48	50.89	x	51.48	
19	B	Zalán Strigencz	Hungary	49.28	50.79	48.43	50.79	
20	B	Enrico Saccomano	Italy	50.17	x	50.39	50.39	
21	A	Berk Sansoy	Turkey	48.28	x	x	48.28	
22	B	Ruben Rolvink	Netherlands	46.99	48.12	x	48.12	
23	B	Rafail Zacharia	Cyprus	x	46.10	x	46.10	
	A	Manuel Anxo Simon	Spain	x	x	x	NM	

=== Final ===
Rank	Name	Nationality	#1	#2	#3	#4	#5	#6	Result	Notes
1st place, gold medalist(s)	Mykolas Alekna	Lithuania	67.87	68.34	x	66.50	x	x	68.34	CR
2nd place, silver medalist(s)	Marius Karges	Germany	57.06	x	x	62.56	x	60.27	62.56	
3rd place, bronze medalist(s)	Yasiel Salazar	Spain	61.69	x	x	59.30	x	x	61.69	
4	Steven Richter	Germany	57.14	x	61.01	60.00	60.33	59.32	61.01	
5	Marcos Moreno Sáez	Spain	x	51.96	57.40	x	56.61	52.89	57.40	SB
6	Enes Çankaya	Turkey	x	x	56.89	x	48.78	53.73	56.89	
7	Sebastiaan Bonte	Netherlands	53.21	56.09	52.75	55.37	x	53.77	56.09	SB
8	Antti Pränni	Finland	55.66	x	x	x	x	55.83	55.83	
9	Marc-Alexandre Delin	France	x	x	55.19				55.19	
10	Carmelo Alessandro Musci	Italy	54.59	52.92	50.86				54.59	
11	Konstantinos Bouzakis	Greece	54.33	53.68	x				54.33	
12	Rami Kankaanpää	Finland	52.09	53.12	53.62				53.62	
