= Athletics at the 2024 Summer Olympics – Men's discus throw =

Men's discus throw at the Games of the XXXIII Olympiad
- Venue: Stade de France, Paris, France
- Date: 5 August 2024 (qualification) 7 August 2024 (final)
- Winning distance: 70.00 OR

Medalists
1st place, gold medalist(s)		Rojé Stona	Jamaica
2nd place, silver medalist(s)		Mykolas Alekna	Lithuania
3rd place, bronze medalist(s)		Matthew Denny	Australia

The men's discus throw at the 2024 Summer Olympics was held in Paris, France, on 5 and 7 August 2024.

== Summary ==
At 21 years old, Mykolas Alekna set a new discus throw world record with a distance of 74.35 m (243 ft 11 in) during a competition in Ramona, Oklahoma. His performance included three throws exceeding 72 meters and all six surpassing 70 meters, making it one of the most consistent series in the sport’s history. This achievement put him in contention to surpass the Olympic Record of 69.89 meters, set in 2004 by his father, Virgilijus Alekna.

In recent years, Mykolas Alekna had earned silver and bronze medals at the World Championships. The competition featured several prominent athletes, including Daniel Ståhl, the defending champion and 2023 Gold Medalist; Lukas Weißhaidinger, the returning bronze medalist; Kristjan Čeh, the 2022 World Champion and 2023 silver medalist; and Andrius Gudžius, the 2022 bronze medalist. Alex Rose, ranked second on the world list for the season and the eleventh-best performer in history, also competed, while Ståhl and Čeh shared the fifth-best performance in history.

In the final, Kristjan Čeh, the second thrower in the order, recorded 67.27 meters. Matt Denny followed with 66.89 meters, and Andrius Gudžius threw 66.45 meters. Alekna then took the lead with his first throw. In the second round, Alekna improved with a throw of 68.42 meters but was overtaken by Denny, who threw 69.31 meters. Alekna regained the lead by breaking his father’s Olympic Record with a throw of 69.97 meters, surpassing the previous mark by eight centimeters.

Rojé Stona was the only competitor among the leaders to improve in the third round, throwing 66.16 meters to move into seventh place and secure three additional attempts. In the fourth round, Stona threw 70.00 meters (229 feet 7 inches), surpassing Alekna’s mark by three centimeters and becoming the first athlete to reach the 70-meter mark in a windless, enclosed stadium. Despite Alekna making three more attempts to reclaim the lead, Stona’s throw remained unmatched, securing his victory.

== Background ==
The men's discus throw has been present on the Olympic athletics programme since the inaugural edition in 1896. This was the 30th time that the event was contested at the Summer Olympics.

== Records ==
=== Prior Records ===
Prior to this competition, the existing world, Olympic, and area records are as follows.

Global records before the 2024 Summer Olympics
Record	Athlete (Nation)	Distance (m)	Location	Date
World record	Mykolas Alekna (LIT)	74.35	Ramona, United States	14 April 2024
Olympic record	Virgilijus Alekna (LIT)	69.89	Athens, Greece	23 August 2004
World leading	Mykolas Alekna (LIT)	74.35	Ramona, United States	14 April 2024

Area records before the 2024 Summer Olympics
Area Record	Athlete (Nation)	Distance (m)
Africa (records)	Frantz Kruger (RSA)	70.32
Asia (records)	Ehsan Hadadi (IRI)	69.32
Europe (records)	Mykolas Alekna (LIT)	74.35 WR
North, Central America and Caribbean (records)	Ben Plucknett (USA)	71.32
Oceania (records)	Alex Rose (SAM)	71.48
South America (records)	Mauricio Ortega (COL)	70.29

=== Olympic Record broken ===
Virgilijus Alekna's 20-year Olympic record of 69.89 meters, set in Athens 2004, was broken twice at in the finals — first by his son Mykolas with a throw of 69.97 meters, and then by Rojé Stona with a throw of 70.00 meters.

Record	Athlete (Nation)	Distance (m)	Attempt
Olympic record	Mykolas Alekna (LIT)	69.97	2
Olympic record	Rojé Stona (JAM)	70.00	4

== Qualification ==
For the men's discus throw event, the qualification period was between 1 July 2023 and 30 June 2024. 32 athletes were able to qualify for the event, with a maximum of three athletes per nation, by throwing the entry standard of 67.20 m or further or by their World Athletics Ranking for this event.

== Results ==
=== Qualification ===
The qualification was held on 5 August, starting at 10:10 (UTC+2) for Group A and 11:35 (UTC+2) for Group B in the morning. 32 athletes qualified for the first round by qualification time or world ranking.

Rank	Group	Athlete	Nation	1	2	3	Distance	Notes
1	A	Mykolas Alekna	Lithuania	x	67.47		67.47	Q
2	A	Matthew Denny	Australia	64.27	66.83		66.83	Q
3	A	Lukas Weißhaidinger	Austria	66.72			66.72	Q
4	B	Clemens Prüfer	Germany	66.36			66.36	Q
5	A	Traves Smikle	Jamaica	59.18	65.91		65.91	q
6	B	Rojé Stona	Jamaica	x	65.32	63.30	65.32	q
7	A	Ralford Mullings	Jamaica	65.18	x	x	65.18	q
8	A	Daniel Ståhl	Sweden	65.16	63.36	63.98	65.16	q
9	B	Kristjan Čeh	Slovenia	x	64.80	64.56	64.80	q
10	B	Andrius Gudžius	Lithuania	60.83	64.07	x	64.07	q
11	B	Alin Firfirică	Romania	61.98	x	63.66	63.66	q
12	B	Alex Rose	Samoa	62.88	x	60.94	62.88	q
13	B	Connor Bell	New Zealand	59.76	62.88	x	62.88	
14	A	Sam Mattis	United States	62.66	x	x	62.66	
15	B	Philip Milanov	Belgium	60.28	x	62.44	62.44	
16	A	Martin Marković	Croatia	61.22	62.31	61.62	62.31	
17	A	Andrew Evans	United States	60.15	x	62.25	62.25	
18	A	Mauricio Ortega	Colombia	x	61.65	61.97	61.97	
19	A	Lolassonn Djouhan	France	61.93	61.72	x	61.93	
20	A	Nicholas Percy	Great Britain	59.87	61.81	58.89	61.81	
21	B	Miká Sosna	Germany	x	x	61.81	61.81	
22	B	Joseph Brown	United States	x	61.68	x	61.68	
23	A	Francois Prinsloo	South Africa	51.64	61.35	x	61.35	
24	B	Lawrence Okoye	Great Britain	61.17	60.40	x	61.17	
25	B	Juan José Caicedo	Ecuador	60.99	60.44	x	60.99	
26	A	Mario Díaz	Cuba	60.05	60.92	59.63	60.92	
27	B	Victor Hogan	South Africa	x	60.11	60.78	60.78	
28	A	Martynas Alekna	Lithuania	58.34	57.53	58.66	58.66	
29	B	Tom Reux	France	x	56.88	58.22	58.22	
	A	Henrik Janssen	Germany	x	x	x	NM	
	B	Oussama Khennoussi	Algeria	x	x	x	NM	
	B	Claudio Romero	Chile	x	x	x	NM	

=== Final ===
The final was held on 7 August, starting at 20:25 (UTC+2) in the evening.

All three medalists posted some of the longest throws in Olympic history, surpassing Virgilijus Alekna's 69.89 meters (Athens 2004) and 69.3 meters (Sydney 2000), and Lars Riedel's 69.4 meters (Atlanta 1996).

Rank	Athlete	Nation	1	2	3	4	5	6	Distance	Notes
1st place, gold medalist(s)	Rojé Stona	Jamaica	61.66	65.20	66.16	70.00	x	x	70.00	OR, PB
2nd place, silver medalist(s)	Mykolas Alekna	Lithuania	68.55	69.97	x	68.88	68.49	x	69.97	
3rd place, bronze medalist(s)	Matthew Denny	Australia	66.89	69.31	68.39	x	69.15	66.44	69.31	
4	Kristjan Čeh	Slovenia	67.27	68.41	x	66.36	66.34	x	68.41	
5	Lukas Weißhaidinger	Austria	60.02	67.54	64.52	x	64.43	x	67.54	
6	Clemens Prüfer	Germany	65.79	65.58	65.68	67.41	x	x	67.41	
7	Daniel Ståhl	Sweden	64.97	66.95	64.06	66.00	x	x	66.95	
8	Andrius Gudžius	Lithuania	66.45	65.02	x	x	x	66.55	66.55	
9	Ralford Mullings	Jamaica	65.61	x	x	Did not advance			65.61	
10	Traves Smikle	Jamaica	63.77	64.11	64.97	Did not advance			64.97	
11	Alin Firfirică	Romania	64.45	63.00	62.84	Did not advance			64.45	
12	Alex Rose	Samoa	60.07	61.89	x	Did not advance			61.89	
