= Mykolas Alekna =

Lithuanian athletics competitor

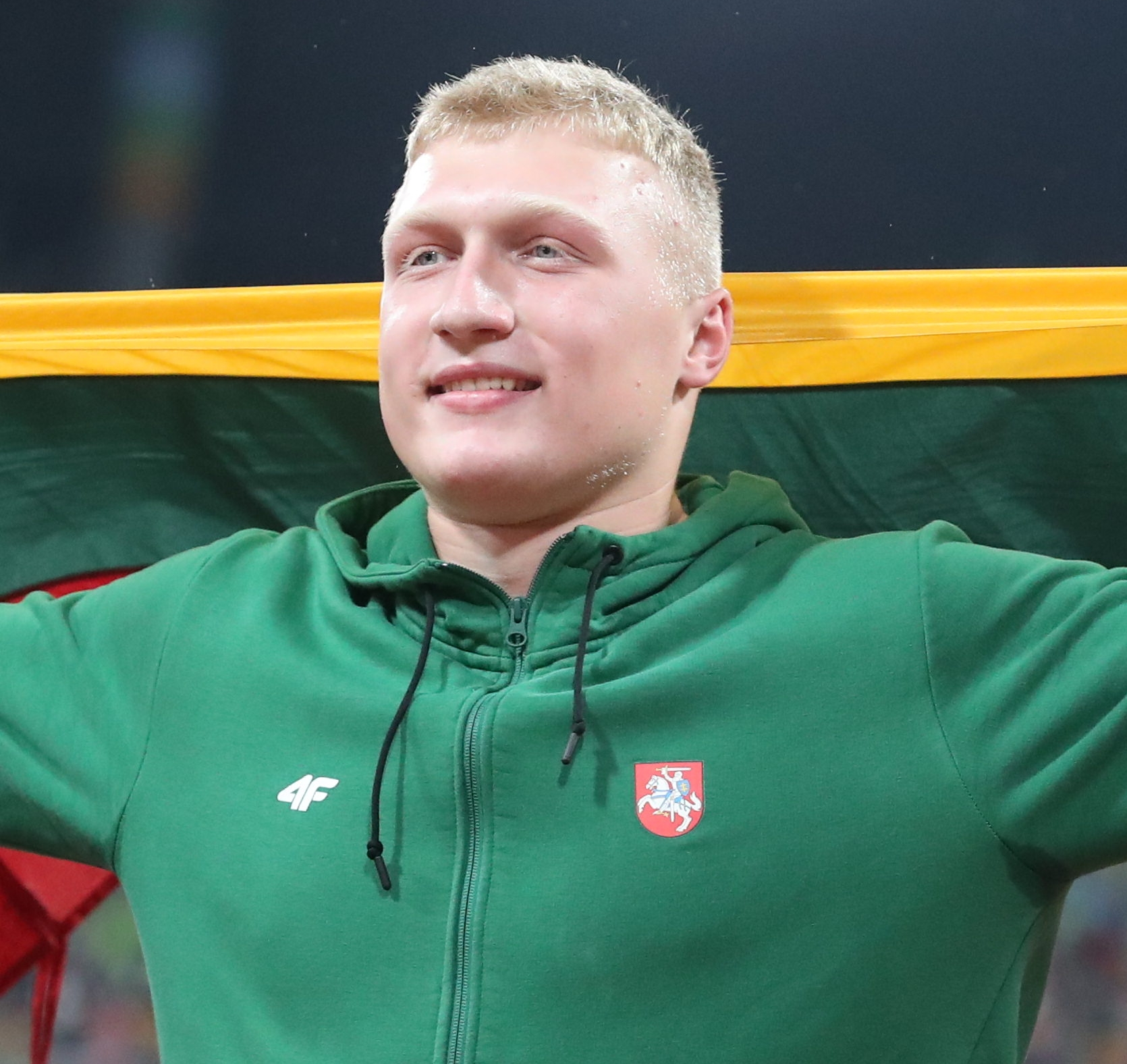
- Alekna in Munich 2022

Personal information
- Nationality: Lithuanian
- Born: 28 September 2002 (age 24) Vilnius, Lithuania
- Height: 1.94 m (6 ft 4 in)

Sport
- Country: Lithuania
- Sport: Athletics
- Event: Discus throw
- College team: Oregon Ducks

Achievements and titles
- Personal bests: 75.56 m (247 ft 10 3/4 in) (Oklahoma, 2025) WR
Medal record
Men's athletics
Representing Lithuania
Olympic Games
Silver medal – second place	2024 Paris	Discus throw
World Championships
Silver medal – second place	2022 Eugene	Discus throw
Silver medal – second place	2025 Tokyo	Discus throw
Bronze medal – third place	2023 Budapest	Discus throw
European Championships
Gold medal – first place	2022 Munich	Discus throw
Silver medal – second place	2026 Birmingham	Discus throw
Bronze medal – third place	2024 Rome	Discus throw
Diamond League
First place	2025 Zürich	Discus Throw
World U20 Championships
Gold medal – first place	2021 Nairobi	Discus throw
European U23 Championships
Gold medal – first place	2023 Espoo	Discus throw
European U20 Championships
Gold medal – first place	2021 Tallinn	Discus throw

Mykolas Alekna (born 28 September 2002) is a Lithuanian athlete who specializes in the discus throw. He is the current men's world record holder of the event with 75.56 metres (247 ft 10.8 in). He competes for the University of Oregon.

At the age of 19, Alekna won the silver medal at the 2022 World Championships, becoming the youngest world discus medallist in history. Alekna was then the youngest ever winner in his discipline at the 2022 European Championships, setting the competition record in the process. In 2021, he was the World Under-20 and European U20 champion.

Alekna is the son of double Olympic discus throw champion Virgilijus Alekna. His brother Martynas Alekna is also a discus thrower.

== Career ==
In June 2022, 19-year-old Mykolas Alekna threw his new personal best of 69.81 m while finishing second at the Stockholm Diamond League meet, the longest ever discus throw by a teenager. At the 2022 World Championships held in Eugene, Oregon in July, he lost only to Kristjan Čeh, becoming the youngest world discus medallist in history. Less than a month later at the European Championships Munich 2022, Alekna became the first teenager to win a medal in the discus throw, let alone the gold, beating Čeh and all three medallists from the 2020 Tokyo Olympics. His father had won this title 16 years earlier.

On 29 April 2023 at The Big Meet in Berkeley, California, Alekna became the youngest discus thrower in history to throw beyond 70 metres, moving up to 18th on the world all-time list with his new best of 71.00 m, a new European U23 record.

On the second day of the 2024 Oklahoma Throws Series World Invitational in Ramona, Oklahoma, on 14 April, Alekna set a new world record of 74.35 m, surpassing Jürgen Schult's previous record of 74.08 m. This record had stood since 1986, making it the longest-standing world record in men's athletics. Under near-perfect conditions, Alekna surpassed the mark of 70 m with all six of his attempts (throwing 72.21, 70.32, 72.89, 70.51, 74.35 and 70.50 m), each of which stood among the 100 best discus throws of all time.

In the Paris 2024 Olympics, Alekna secured the silver medal with a throw of 69.97 metres on his second attempt, surpassing his father Virgiljus' Olympic record that had stood since Athens 2004. However, the record was broken by gold medalist Rojé Stona minutes later, who threw his personal best and set a new Olympic record at 70.0 metres.

Early in 2025, Alekna competed for University of California, Berkeley at the 2025 Oklahoma Throws Series World Invitational in Ramona, Oklahoma, on April 13. Early in the competition, Alekna threw a new world record of 74.89 m. In a later round, Alekna made a throw that was initially outside of the right hand sector while in mid-air but was blown back in bounds for a new world record of 75.56 m. This throw made Alekna the first male competitor to throw over 75 meters in discus history. It also set a new NCAA record. Alekna won the silver medal with a throw of 67.84m at the 2025 World Athletics Championships in Tokyo. He also transferred to the University of Oregon in 2025 but tore his pectoral muscle before the start of the 2026 collegiate season.

== International competitions ==
Representing Lithuania
Year	Competition	Venue	Position	Event	Notes
2019	European Youth Summer Olympic Festival	Baku, Azerbaijan	9th	Discus throw (1.5 kg)	54.13 m
2021	European U20 Championships	Tallinn, Estonia	1st	Discus throw (1.75 kg)	68.00 m
2021	World U20 Championships	Nairobi, Kenya	1st	Discus throw (1.75 kg)	69.81 m
2022	World Championships	Eugene, United States	2nd	Discus throw	69.27 m
2022	European Championships	Munich, Germany	1st	Discus throw	69.78 m CR
2023	European U23 Championships	Espoo, Finland	1st	Discus throw	68.34 m CR
2023	World Championships	Budapest, Hungary	3rd	Discus throw	68.85 m
2024	European Championships	Rome, Italy	3rd	Discus throw	67.48 m
2024	Olympic Games	Paris, France	2nd	Discus throw	69.97 m
2025	World Championships	Tokyo, Japan	2nd	Discus throw	67.84m
2026	European Championships	Birmingham, United Kingdom	2nd	Discus throw	69.89 m

Records
Preceded by Jürgen Schult	Men's discus world record holder 14 April 2024 - present	Succeeded by Incumbent
Awards
Preceded by Mindaugas Griškonis	Lithuanian Sportsman of the Year; 2022, 2023	Succeeded by TBD
