= 2021 World Athletics U20 Championships – Men's discus throw =

Men's discus throw at the 2021 World Athletics U20 Championships
- Venue: Kasarani Stadium
- Dates: 21 August (qualification); 22 August (final)
- Competitors: 15 from 11 nations
- Winning distance: 69.81 m

Medalists
gold medal	Mykolas Alekna	Lithuania
silver medal	Ralford Mullings	Jamaica
bronze medal	Raman Khartanovich	Belarus

The men's discus throw at the 2021 World Athletics U20 Championships was held at the Kasarani Stadium on 21 and 22 August.

== Records ==
Standing records prior to the 2021 World Athletics U20 Championships
World U20 Record	Mykyta Nesterenko (UKR)	70.13	Halle, Germany	24 May 2008
Championship Record	Margus Hunt (EST)	67.32	Beijing, China	16 August 2006
World U20 Leading	Mykolas Alekna (LTU)	69.77	Vilnius, Lithuania	29 June 2021

== Results ==
=== Qualification ===
The qualification took place on 21 August, in two groups, with Group A starting at 10:46 and Group B starting at 11:35. Athletes attaining a mark of at least 58.00 metres ( Q ) or at least the 12 best performers ( q ) qualified for the final.

Rank	Group	Name	Nationality	Round			Mark	Notes
Rank	Group	Name	Nationality	1	2	3	Mark	Notes
1	A	Mykolas Alekna	Lithuania	64.04			64.04	Q
2	B	Ralford Mullings	Jamaica	55.01	62.49		62.49	Q
3	A	Uladzislau Puchko	Belarus	61.08			61.08	Q
4	B	Sadegh Samimishalamzari	Iran	61.01			61.01	Q
5	B	Raman Khartanovich	Belarus	57.21	58.37		58.37	Q
6	A	Semen Borodayev	Authorised Neutral Athletes	58.18			58.18	Q, PB
7	B	Marcos Moreno	Spain	58.04			58.04	Q
8	A	Mohammadreza Rahmanifar	Iran	53.35	x	57.93	57.93	q
9	A	Enes Çankaya	Turkey	47.04	55.49	57.28	57.28	q
10	B	Dimitrios Pavlidis	Greece	x	52.64	x	52.64	q
11	A	Trevor Gunzell	Jamaica	51.37	x	x	51.37	q
12	B	Juan Oosthuizen	South Africa	x	x	50.19	50.19	q
13	B	Titus Kiptoo Limo	Kenya	43.83	45.05	41.01	45.05	
	A	Konstantinos Bouzakis	Greece	x	x	x	NM	
	B	Zalán Strigencz	Hungary	x	x	x	NM	

=== Final ===
The final was held on 22 August at 16:00.

Rank	Name	Nationality	Round						Mark	Notes
Rank	Name	Nationality	1	2	3	4	5	6	Mark	Notes
1st place, gold medalist(s)	Mykolas Alekna	Lithuania	69.81	x	68.52	67.67	67.10	66.46	69.81	CR
2nd place, silver medalist(s)	Ralford Mullings	Jamaica	64.74	66.68	63.75	60.90	x	64.90	66.68	PB
3rd place, bronze medalist(s)	Raman Khartanovich	Belarus	54.61	58.08	62.19	59.25	x	58.41	62.19	PB
4	Sadegh Samimishalamzari	Iran	59.65	59.91	58.09	x	58.06	61.07	61.07	
5	Mohammadreza Rahmanifar	Iran	49.65	51.32	59.13	56.81	58.84	58.80	59.13	PB
6	Trevor Gunzell	Jamaica	56.30	X	57.76	58.32	57.83	57.12	58.32	
7	Enes Çankaya	Turkey	56.14	56.62	x	x	58.10	57.80	58.10	
8	Semen Borodayev	Authorised Neutral Athletes	56.42	55.05	x	58.03	57.51	56.97	58.03	
9	Marcos Moreno	Spain	x	54.49	x				54.49	
10	Dimitrios Pavlidis	Greece	x	52.83	x				52.83	
11	Juan Oosthuizen	South Africa	x	50.45	51.01				51.01	
	Uladzislau Puchko	Belarus	x	x	x				NM	
