= Shaquille Emanuelson =

Dutch discus thrower

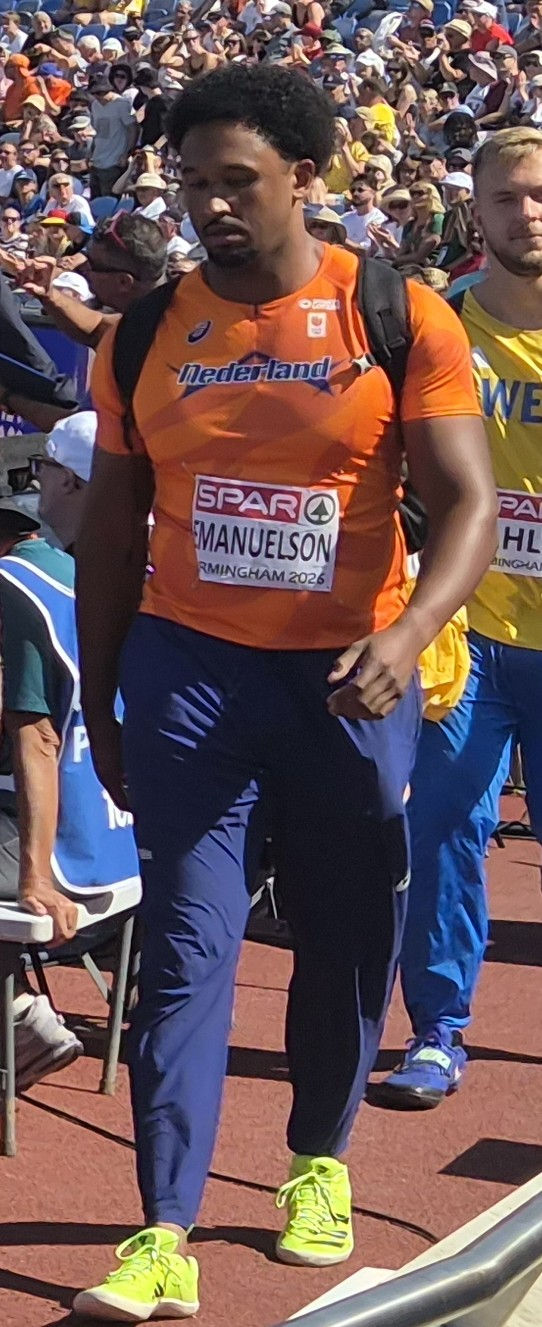
- 2026 European Championships

Personal information
- Born: 8 January 2000 (age 26) Paramaribo, Suriname

Sport
- Sport: Athletics
- Event: Discus

Achievements and titles
- Personal bests: Discus 69.65 m (Rsmona, 2025) NR

Shaquille Emanuelson (born 8 January 2000) is a Dutch discus thrower. He won the Dutch Athletics Championships in 2024 and set a new Dutch national record for the event in April 2025.

== Early and personal life ==
He was born in Paramaribo, Suriname. In his childhood he lived in Yemen and Poland due to his parents work for the Dutch embassy. After moving to the Netherlands, his family settled in Delft, where he and his brother Isiah joined the athlefics club AV '40. He later lived in Arnhem. He is the second cousin of former professional football player Urby Emanuelson.

== Career ==
He is a member of Haag Atletiek in The Hague, Netherlands. He was Dutch junior champion in the discus throw in 2019, and also placed third at the senior Dutch Athletics Championships that year, with a throw of 55.23 meters.

He was selected to represent the Netherlands at the 2024 European Throwing Cup in Portugal, throwing 54.42 metres. He qualified for the final at the 2024 European Athletics Championships in Rome, Italy, placing eleventh overall, with his best throw of 63.36 metres in qualification and a throw of 61.96 metres in the final of his debut performance at the Championships. He won the 2024 Dutch Athletics Championships in Hengelo in June 2024.

He set a new Dutch national record for discus throw of 69.65 metres in April 2025 whilst competing in Ramona, Oklahoma. The throw broke the previous record that has stood since 1991, and had been set by Erik de Bruin. He was runner-up to Ruben Rolvink at the 2025 Dutch Athletics Championships in Hengelo in August 2025. In September 2025, he competed in the discus throw at the 2025 World Championships in Tokyo, Japan, without advancing to the final.

In August 2026, he placed fifth overall competing at the 2026 European Athletics Championships in Birmingham, England, in the discus throw.
