= Athletics at the 2023 Pan American Games – Men's discus throw =

Men's discus throw at the 2023 Pan American Games
- Venue: Julio Martínez National Stadium
- Dates: October 30
- Competitors: 12 from 9 nations
- Winning distance: 63.39

Medalists
Gold medal	Lucas Nervi	Chile
Silver medal	Mauricio Ortega	Colombia
Bronze medal	Fedrick Dacres	Jamaica

The men's discus throw competition of the athletics events at the 2023 Pan American Games was held on October 30 at the Julio Martínez National Stadium of Santiago, Chile.

== Records ==
Prior to this competition, the existing world and Pan American Games records were as follows:

World record	Jürgen Schult (GDR)	74.08	Neubrandenburg, East Germany	June 6, 1986
Pan American Games record	Fedrick Dacres (JAM)	67.68	Lima, Peru	August 6, 2019

== Schedule ==
Date	Time	Round
October 30, 2023	19:30	Final

== Results ==
All times shown are in seconds.

KEY:	NR	National record	PB	Personal best	SB	Seasonal best	DQ	Disqualified

=== Final ===
The results were as follows:

Rank	Name	Nationality	#1	#2	#3	#4	#5	#6	Mark	Notes
1st place, gold medalist(s)	Lucas Nervi	Chile	59.53	X	63.39	61.45	X	X	63.39	SB
2nd place, silver medalist(s)	Mauricio Ortega	Colombia	X	59.77	61.86	61.40	59.33	58.48	61.86	
3rd place, bronze medalist(s)	Fedrick Dacres	Jamaica	X	60.99	60.04	61.25	60.90	X	61.25	
4	Mario Díaz	Cuba	X	61.09	60.51	59.51	50.83	59.01	61.09	
5	Joseph Brown	United States	60.14	X	X	59.35	57.07	X	60.14	
6	Kai Chang	Jamaica	59.31	58.37	59.58	59.96	X	59.65	59.96	
7	Jorge Fernández	Cuba	X	59.12	58.02	X	X	X	59.12	
8	Dallin Shurts	United States	56.66	X	X	57.00	56.35	58.69	57.00	
9	Djimon Gumbs	British Virgin Islands	53.76	X	54.70				54.70	
10	Alan de Falchi	Brazil	53.72	53.14	54.34				54.34	
	Claudio Romero	Chile	X	X	X				NM	
	Juan José Caicedo	Ecuador							DNS	
