= Ralford Mullings =

Jamaican athlete (born 2002)

Personal information
- Nationality: Jamaican
- Born: 22 November 2002 (age 23)

Sport
- Sport: Athletics
- Event: Discus throw

Achievements and titles
- Personal bests: Discus throw: 72.01 m (Ramona, 2025) NR
Medal record
Men's athletics
Representing Jamaica
World U20 Championships
Silver medal – second place	2021 Nairobi	Discus
NACAC U23 Championships
Gold medal – first place	2023 San Jose	Discus
Carifta Games Junior (U20)
Silver medal – second place	2019 George Town	Discus throw
CARIFTA Games Youth (U18)
Silver medal – second place	2019 George Town	Discus throw
Silver medal – second place	2019 George Town	Shot put

Ralford Mullings (born 22 November 2002) is a Jamaican track and field athlete who competes in the discus throw. He won the Jamaican Athletics Championships in 2025 and 2026, and won the 2025 and 2026 NCAA Outdoor Championships in the United States. He represented Jamaica at the 2024 Olympic Games.

== Early life ==
He attended Kingston College in his homeland where he was coached by Caniggia Raynor.

He joined Arizona State University in 2021. He then studied at the University of Arkansas. He later transferred to the University of Oklahoma.

== Career ==
Mullings threw a junior personal best distance of 66.16m at the Jamaican U20 championships in Kingston, Jamaica in 2021. He was a World U20 Championships silver medallist in the discus throw in Nairobi in 2021, with a new junior personal best 66.68 metres.

Mullings threw a new personal best of 65.39m in April 2022, whilst a freshman at Arizona State University in the United States. Mullings became the NACAC U23 champion in the discus throw in Costa Rica in July 2023, with a distance of 61.18 metres.

In April 2024, Mullings threw a personal best distance of 69.67 metres in Oklahoma, it placed him second on the Jamaican all-time list, only behind Fedrick Dacres' 70.78m set in June 2019. He competed in the discus throw at the 2024 Summer Olympics in Paris in August 2024, placing ninth in the final.

Mullings won the discus throw at the 2025 SEC Championships with a throw of 66.48 metres. On 13 June 2025, Mullings threw a meeting record 69.31 meters to win the 2025 NCAA Outdoor Championships in Eugene, Oregon ahead of discus world record holder Mykolas Alekna. He was named men's field athlete of the year at the 2025 NCAA Division I Outdoor Track & Field National Awards.

Mullings won the discus throw at the 2025 Jamaican Athletics Championships on 28 June with a throw of 65.82m. He finished second with 68.98 metres at the 2025 Prefontaine Classic. He set a new national record of 72.01 metres in Ramona at the Oklahoma Throw Series in August 2025. That month, he threw 69.66m to win in the 2025 Diamond League at the 2025 Memorial Van Damme in Brussels, Belgium. In September 2025, he competed in the discus throw at the 2025 World Championships in Tokyo, Japan, without advancing to the final.

On 12 June 2026, Mullings retained his title with a throw of 65.81 meters at the 2026 NCAA Outdoor Championships in Eugene. On 20 June, he threw 64.31 metres to retain his senior national title at the 2026 Jamaican Championships. On 4 July, Mullings was fifth with 64.94m on his professional debut at the 2026 Prefontaine Classic. He placed fifth in the discus throw at the 2026 Commonwealth Games in Glasgow, Scotland.
