= Lucas Nervi =

Chilean discus thrower

Personal information
- Full name: Lucas Nervi Schmidt
- Born: 31 August 2001 (age 25) Santiago
- Education: Pontifical Catholic University of Chile

Sport
- Sport: Athletics
- Event: Discus throw
Medal record
Men's athletics
Representing Chile
Pan American Games
Gold medal – first place	2023 Santiago	Discus throw
Bolivarian Games
Bronze medal – third place	2025 Ayacucho-Lima	Discus throw

Lucas Nervi Schmidt (born 31 August 2001) is a Chilean athlete specialising in the discus throw. He has won several medals at regional level.

== Biography ==
He completed his secondary studies at the Colegio del Verbo Divino and has studied civil engineering at the Pontifical Catholic University of Chile.

Also a musician, Nervi recorded a progressive rock album in Spain after attending the 2024 Summer Olympics.

His personal best in the event is 64.55 metres set in Santiago in 2022.

== International competitions ==
Year	Competition	Venue	Position	Event	Notes
Representing Chile
2018	South American U18 Championships	Cuenca, Ecuador	6th	Shot put (5 kg)	15.91 m
2018	South American U18 Championships	Cuenca, Ecuador	9th	Discus throw (1.5 kg)	42.93 m
2019	Pan American U20 Championships	San José, Costa Rica	7th	Discus throw (1.75 kg)	56.49 m
2021	South American Championships	Guayaquil, Ecuador	1st	Discus throw	63.18 m
2021	South American U23 Championships	Guayaquil, Ecuador	1st	Discus throw	60.87 m
2021	Junior Pan American Games	Cali, Colombia	1st	Discus throw	61.08 m
2022	Ibero-American Championships	La Nucía, Spain	1st	Discus throw	60.58 m
2022	World Championships	Eugene, United States	–	Discus throw	NM
2023	South American Championships	São Paulo, Brazil	4th	Discus throw	59.64 m
2023	World Championships	Budapest, Hungary	32nd (q)	Discus throw	58.76 m
2023	Pan American Games	Santiago, Chile	1st	Discus throw	63.39 m
2024	Ibero-American Championships	Cuiabá, Brazil	5th	Discus throw	60.20 m
2025	South American Championships	Mar del Plata, Argentina	4th	Discus throw	60.64 m
2025	Bolivarian Games	Lima, Peru	3rd	Discus throw	59.65 m
2026	Ibero-American Championships	Lima, Peru	4th	Discus throw	61.90 m
2026	Pan American Championships	Medellín, Colombia	6th	Discus throw	60.34 m
2026	South American Games	Santa Fe, Argentina	4th	Discus throw	60.46 m
