= Mario Díaz (discus thrower) =

Cuban athlete (born 1999)

Personal information
- Full name: Mario Alberto Díaz Torres
- Born: 8 December 1999 (age 26) Matanzas, Cuba

Sport
- Sport: Athletics
- Event: Discus throw

Achievements and titles
- Personal bests: Discus: 65.21m (Havana, 2022)
Medal record
Men's athletics
Representing Cuba
NACAC Championships
Bronze medal – third place	2022 Freeport	Discus throw
Central American and Caribbean Games
Gold medal – first place	2023 San Salvador	Discus throw
Silver medal – second place	2026 Santo Domingo	Discus throw

Mario Alberto Díaz Torres (Note: In this Spanish name, the first or paternal surname is Díaz and the second or maternal family name is Torres.) (born 8 December 1999) is a Cuban discus thrower.

== Career ==
He set a 65.21 metres personal best for the discus throw in 2022. He competed at the 2022 World Athletics Championships in Eugene, Oregon in the men's discus throw, placing twenty second overall with a best throw of 60.83m. He won a bronze medal at the 2022 NACAC Championships in Freeport, Bahamas in August 2022 with a 62.31 metres throw.

He won gold at the 2023 Central American and Caribbean Games in San Salvador in July 2023 with a 62.57 metres throw. He competed in the 2023 World Athletics Championships in Budapest. He finished fourth at the 2023 Pan American Games in Santiago.

He competed in the discus throw at the 2024 Summer Olympics in Paris in August 2024.

In September 2025, he competed in the discus throw at the 2025 World Championships in Tokyo, Japan, placing fifth in the final with a throw of 64.71 metres.
