= Sam Mattis =

American discus thrower

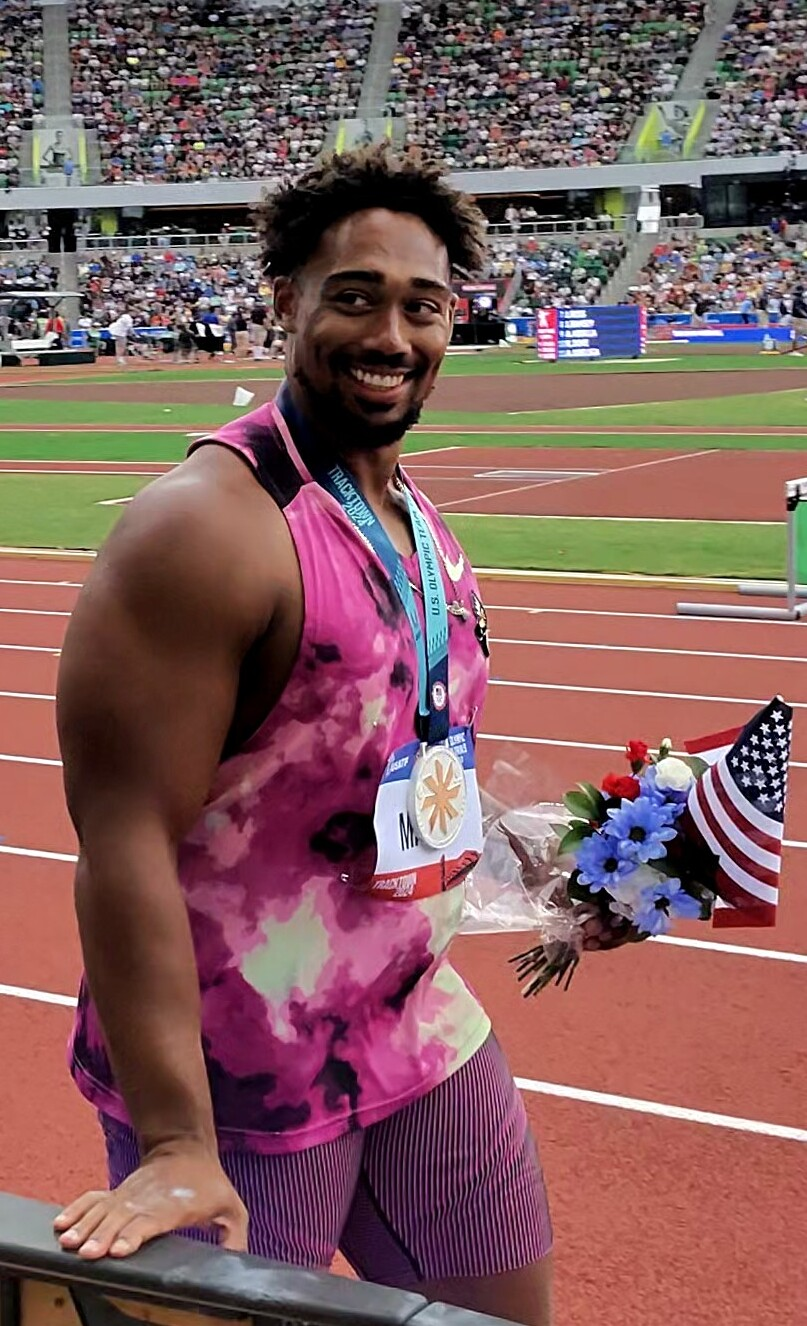
- Mattis in 2024

Personal information
- Full name: Samuel Harrison Mattis
- Nationality: American
- Born: March 19, 1994 (age 32) Manhattan, New York, U.S.
- Height: 6 ft 1 in (185 cm)
- Weight: 245 lb (111 kg)

Sport
- Country: United States
- Sport: Track and field
- Event: Discus throw
- College team: University of Pennsylvania
- Coached by: Marlon Mattis, Jake Brenza

Achievements and titles
- Personal best: 72.45 meters
Medal record
Men's athletics
Representing the United States
NACAC Championships
Silver medal – second place	2025 Freeport	Discus throw
NCAA National Championships
Gold medal – first place	2015 Eugene	Discus
Silver medal – second place	2016 Eugene	Discus

Samuel Harrison Mattis (born March 19, 1994) is an American Olympic track and field athlete who competes in the discus throw, and has a personal record of 72.45 meters. At the 2020 Summer Olympics in Tokyo, he came in 11th. Mattis represented the United States at the 2024 Summer Olympics in Men's discus throw in Paris.

== Early and personal life ==
Mattis was born in Manhattan, New York City, the son of Marlon and Marcie Mattis, and is Jewish as is his mother. His father was born in Jamaica and moved to New York as a child. He has one brother, Jake, who also attended the University of Pennsylvania. His father was the captain of the William & Mary track & field team in 1985, held the 35-lbs weight throw record, and ranks No. 3 in the hammer.

Mattis grew up in East Brunswick, New Jersey, and attended East Brunswick High School, where he competed in the discus throw and shot put events as a teenager.

While in high school Mattis won the 2011 New Jersey Meet of Champions, the 2012 Penn Relays and the 2012 New Balance Nationals, in the discus throw. He graduated high school with a personal best of 218 feet and 4 inches which is one of the top throws in American high school history.

Mattis committed to attend the Wharton School of Business at the University of Pennsylvania, where he graduated with a Bachelor of Science in Finance and Operations Management.

== Career ==
=== College career ===
Sam Mattis competed for the University of Pennsylvania Quakers, where he was a member of the track and field program for four years. He won the discus throw at the 2015 NCAA National Championships. He also won the 2016 Philadelphia College Classic with a throw of 67.45 m (221 ft 3 in), a mark reported as one of the top collegiate performances in the event.

Mattis also earned three NCAA All-American honors, and was named the USATFCCA/NCAA National Scholar of the year. The U.S. Track & Field and Cross Country Coaches Association selected him as the 2015 Male Scholar Athlete of the Year for Division I. He is a four-time Heps Outdoor Champion in the discus throw, and received First-Team All-Ivy honors for each of his four outdoor seasons.

=== Professional career ===
==== 2019 ====
Mattis won the gold medal at the 2019 Outdoor USA Track and Field Championships, with a throw of 218–9. At the World Championships in Doha, Qatar, in 2019, he placed 11th.

==== 2021 ====
In June 2021, Mattis became an Olympian after finishing top three at the 2020 United States Track and Field Olympic Trials. At the 2020 Summer Olympics in Tokyo, he came in 11th.

==== 2022 ====
At the 2022 USA Track and Field Outdoor Championships, Mattis placed third in the discus throw with a mark of 62.24 m (204 ft 2 in), qualifying for the United States team for the World Athletics Championships.

At the 2022 World Athletics Championships in Eugene, Oregon, Mattis qualified for the final in the men's discus throw with a mark of 65.59 m in the qualifying round. In the final, he placed 11th with a best throw of 63.19 m.

==== 2023 ====
Mattis won the gold medal in the discus throw with a throw of 65.93 m (216 ft 3 in) at the 2023 USA Outdoor Track and Field Championships at Hayward Field in Eugene, Oregon in July 2023. He won the silver medal with a throw of 64.69m at the 2023 Doha Diamond League in Doha, Qatar.

==== 2024 ====
Mattis won the silver medal in the discus throw with a throw of 66.07 m (216 ft 9 in) at the 2024 United States Olympic trials. Mattis represented the United States at the 2024 Summer Olympics in Men's discus throw at Stade de France in Paris.

2025

At the 2025 Oklahoma Throws Series World Invitational in Ramona, Oklahoma, Sam Mattis competed in the men's discus throw. He placed third in the event with a mark of 71.27 m (233 ft 10 in), achieved in the final round of competition. The meet featured multiple throws over 70 m among the top competitors. Mattis’ 71.27 m throw was his then personal-best performance and ranked among the top American performances of the 2025 season.

Mattis completed at the 2025 World Athletics Championship but did not make the final.

2026

On April 9, 2026, Mattis competed at the Oklahoma Throws Series World Invitational in Ramona, Oklahoma, in the men's discus throw. He placed fourth in a highly competitive field with a mark of 72.45 m (237 ft 8 in), setting a new personal best and beating the previous American record held by Ben Plucknett from 1981.

== Honors ==
In 2023, Mattis was inducted into the Philadelphia Jewish Sports Hall of Fame.

== Personal life ==
Mattis lives in Fleetwood, Pennsylvania. Mattis attends and help Throws University in Fleetwood, Pennsylvania.

== Major competition record ==
Year	Competition	Venue	Position	Event	Notes
Representing the United States
2016	2016 NCAA National Championships	Hayward Field - Oregon	2nd	Discus throw	60.96 m (200 ft 0 in)
2016	Ivy League Outdoor Championships	Weaver Track & Field Stadium - Princeton University	1st	Discus throw	62.45 m (204 ft 10 1/2 in)
2015	2015 NCAA National Championships	Hayward Field - Oregon	1st	Discus throw	62.48 m (204 ft 11 3/4 in)
2015	Ivy League Outdoor Championships	Franklin Field - Penn	1st	Discus throw	61.75 m (202 ft 7 in)
2014	2014 NCAA National Championships	Hayward Field - Oregon	5th	Discus throw	60.33 m (197 ft 11 in)
2014	Ivy League Outdoor Championships	Reese Stadium - Yale	1st	Discus throw	58.72 m (192 ft 7 3/4 in)
2013	Ivy League Outdoor Championships	Weaver Track & Field Stadium - Princeton	1st	Discus throw	58.34 m (191 ft 4 3/4 in)

== Personal bests ==
Event	Best (m)	Venue	Date
Discus throw (outdoor)	72.45	Ramona, Oklahoma	April 9, 2026
Shot put (outdoor)	17.29	Princeton, New Jersey	May 8, 2016
Shot put (indoor)	17.06	Ithaca, New York	February 28, 2016

- Information taken from World Athletics and Direct Athletics profiles.

== See also ==
- List of select Jewish track and field athletes
- List of United States records in track and field
- List of United States collegiate records in track and field
- List of USA Outdoor Track and Field Championships winners (men)
