= Diego Casas (discus thrower) =

Spanish athlete (born 1999)

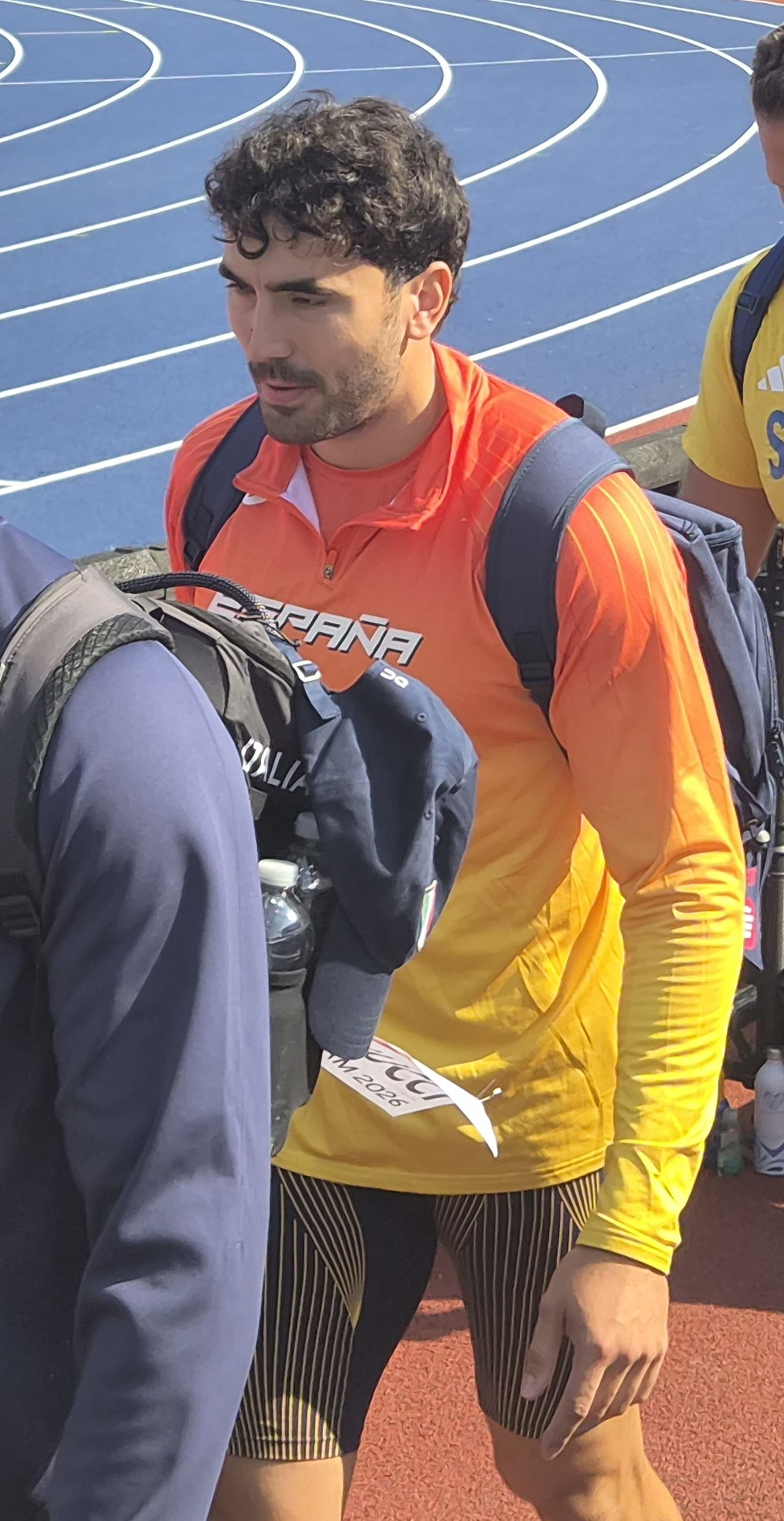
- Casas at the 2026 European Championships

Personal information
- Born: 29 April 1999 (age 27)

Sport
- Sport: Athletics
- Event: Discus throw

Achievements and titles
- Personal best: Discus: 65.95 (2026)
Medal record
Men's athletics
Representing Spain
Ibero-American Championships
Silver medal – second place	2024 Cuiabá	Discus
Mediterranean Games
Silver medal – second place	2026 Taranto	Discus

Diego Casas (born 29 April 1999) is a Spanish discus thrower. He is a multiple-time national champion and competed for Spain at the 2025 World Athletics Championships.

== Biography ==
From Valladolid, he is a member of Playas de Castellón. He won the discus throw at the Spanish Athletics Championships in 2023 and threw over 60 metres for the first time that year.

Casas made a new personal best throw in April 2024 of 63.20 metres. Casas finished with a silver medal in the discus throw at the 2024 Ibero-American Athletics Championships in May 2024 in Brazil, with a throw of 61.91 metres. Late that month he threw a new personal best of 64.66 metres. In June, he was selected for the 2024 European Athletics Championships in Rome, Italy. At the championships he threw 60.25 metres and did not proceed to the final. At the end of June, he retained his Spanish national title in La Nucia with a throw of 61.25 metres.

In June 2025, he represented Spain at the 2025 European Athletics Team Championships in Madrid, placing fourth overall with a throw of 64.77 metres. Having retained the Spanish national title in Tarragona in August, with a best throw of 62.86 m, he was selected to compete for Spain at the 2025 World Athletics Championships in Tokyo, throwing 62.45 metres without advancing to the final.

In March 2026, he placed fourth at the 2026 European Throwing Cup in Nicosia, Cyprus with a throw of 65.38 metres. In May 2026, he won the men's title in the discus throw at the European Champions Club Cup in Castellon. In July, he won his fourth consecutive Spanish national title in Malaga with a throw of 63.85 metres. In August, he competed at the 2026 European Athletics Championships in Birmingham, England, in the discus throw, placing sixth overall.
