= Tom Reux =

French athlete (born 1999)

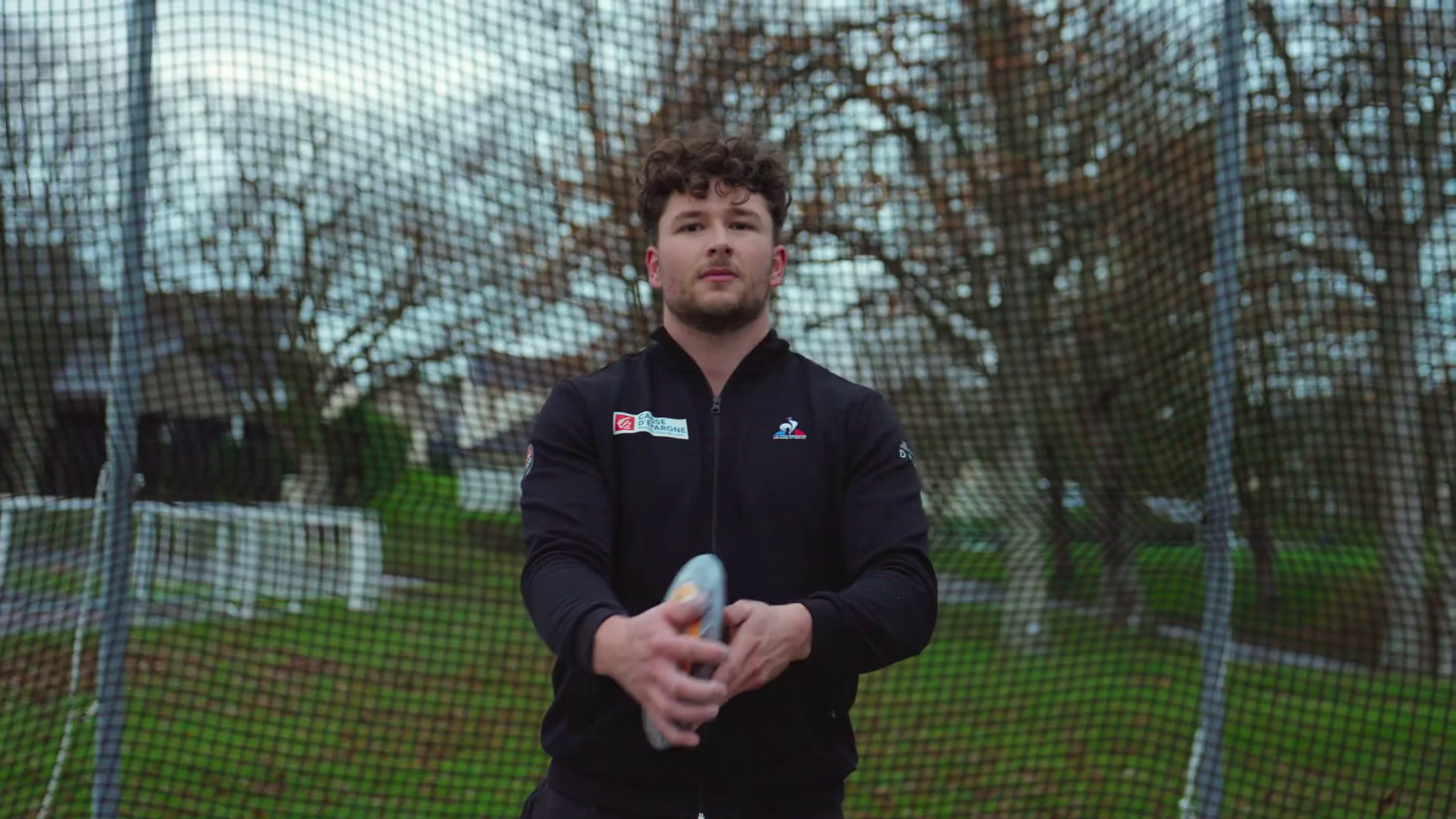
- Reux in 2024

Personal information
- Born: 24 February 1999 (age 27) Stains, Seine-Saint-Denis, France
- Height: 188 cm (6 ft 2 in)
- Weight: 108 kg (238 lb)

Sport
- Sport: Athletics
- Event: Discus

Achievements and titles
- Personal best: Discus: 67.91m (2024)

Tom Reux (born 24 February 1999) is a French discus thrower. He won the French national championships title in 2021 and 2023.

== Career ==
He won the discus throw at the 2021 French Athletics Championships in Angers, with a mark of 60.68 metres.

He won his second national title in 2023 with a throw of 59.88 metres at the 2023 French Athletics Championships in Albi.

On 18 May 2024 at the Martinique Meeting in Fort-de-France, he improved his personal record by more than six metres and achieved the second best French performance of all time with 67.91m throw.

He competed in the discus throw at the 2024 Summer Olympics in Paris in August 2024.

== Personal life ==
From Saint-Malo in Brittany, he trains in Dinard whilst living in Saint-Benoît-des-Ondes in the bay of Mont Saint-Michel.
