= Dimitrios Pavlidis =

Greek athlete (born 2000)

Personal information
- Nationality: Greek
- Born: 21 September 2003 (age 22)

Sport
- Sport: Athletics
- Event: Discus

Achievements and titles
- Personal bests: Discus 65.11 m (Ramona, 2025) NR

Dimitrios Pavlidis (born 21 September 2003) is a Greek discus thrower. He is the Greek national record holder and has won multiple Greek Athletics Championships. He competed at the 2025 World Athletics Championships.

== Biography ==
He finished in fourth place at the 2022 World Athletics U20 Championships in Cali, Colombia with a throw of 61.77 metres. He set a Greek national record with a throw of 64.90 metres in 2023. He won the Greek Athletics Championships in the discus throw in June 2024, with a throw of 61.54 metres.

He set a new Greek national record with a throw of 65.11 metres in Ramona, Oklahoma in April 2025. In June 2025, he finished ninth at the 2025 European Athletics Team Championships First Division in Madrid, Spain, with a throw of 59.78 m.

He finished in fifth place at the 2025 European Athletics U23 Championships in Bergen, Norway in July 2025, with a throw of 58.99 metres, having thrown 59.74 metres in qualification. He retained his national title in Volos at the Greek Championships in August 2025. He competed at the 2025 World Athletics Championships in Tokyo, Japan, in September 2025, throwing 62.49 metres.

In August 2026, he placed eighth overall competing at the 2026 European Athletics Championships in Birmingham, England, in the discus throw.

== Personal life ==
He attended University of Kansas in the United States where he competed for the Kansas Jayhawks from 2022.
