= Kristjan Čeh =

Slovenian discus thrower (born 1999)

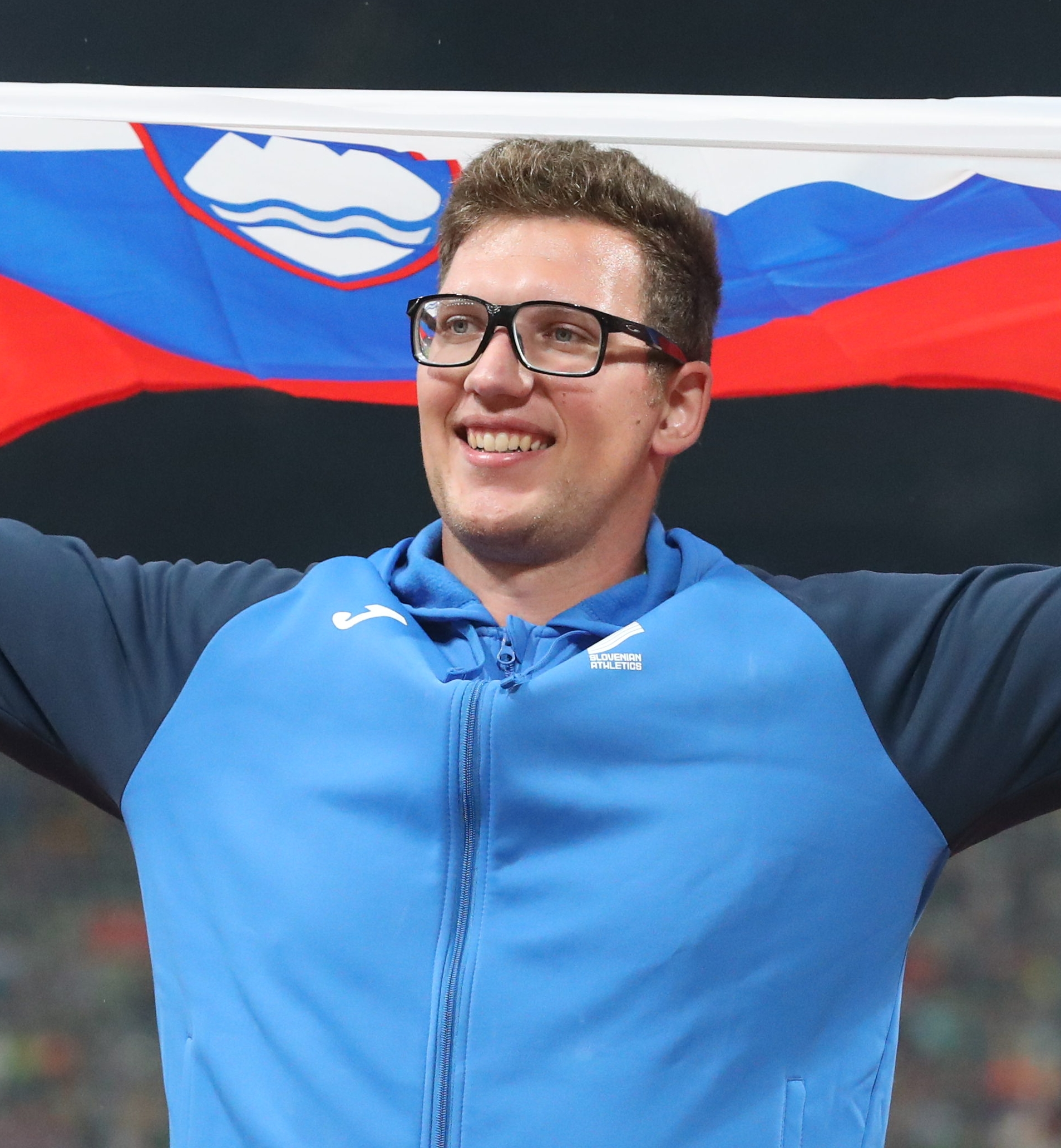

Personal information
- Born: 17 February 1999 (age 27) Ptuj, Slovenia
- Height: 2.06 m (6 ft 9 in)

Sport
- Sport: Athletics
- Event: Discus throw
- Coached by: Mart Olman

Achievements and titles
- Highest world ranking: 1st (2023)
- Personal best: 72.61 (9 April 2026)
Medal record
Men's athletics
Representing Slovenia
World Championships
Gold medal – first place	2022 Eugene	Discus throw
Silver medal – second place	2023 Budapest	Discus throw
Diamond League
First place	2022	Discus Throw
First place	2026	Discus Throw
European Championships
Gold medal – first place	2024 Rome	Discus throw
Gold medal – first place	2026 Birmingham	Discus throw
Silver medal – second place	2022 Munich	Discus throw
European Games
Gold medal – first place	2023 Kraków-Małopolska	Discus throw
European Throwing Cup
Silver medal – second place	2025 Nicosia	Discus Throw
Mediterranean Games
Gold medal – first place	2026 Taranto	Discus throw
Silver medal – second place	2018 Tarragona	Discus throw

Kristjan Čeh /tʃex/ (born 17 February 1999) is a Slovenian athlete specialising in the discus throw. He is a World Championships gold medallist and two-time European Championships gold medallist. Čeh won the gold medal at the 2022 World Championships, setting a new championship record in the process, the 2024 European Championships and the 2026 European Championships. He placed second at the 2023 World Championships and the 2022 European Championships. Čeh is a two-time Olympian and competed at the 2020 and 2024 Olympic Games.

== Career ==
He represented his country at the 2019 World Athletics Championships without qualifying for the final. Earlier that year he won a gold medal at the European U23 Championships in Gävle, Sweden.

His personal best in the event was 68.75 metres set in Maribor in 2020, until he improved it with 69.52 m (National record) at Mestni stadion, in Ptuj, on 27 May 2021. This was the European U23 Record, before he improved it with 70.35 m in Kuortane (FIN) on 26 June 2021. He again improved his personal best with 71.27 m in Birmingham (GBR) on 21 May 2022.

Since February 2022, he has been coached by Olympic champion Gerd Kanter.

== International competitions ==
Representing Slovenia
Year	Competition	Venue	Position	Event	Result
2016	European Youth Championships	Tbilisi, Georgia	26th (q)	Discus throw (1.5 kg)	47.49 m
2017	European U20 Championships	Grosseto, Italy	–	Discus throw (1.75 kg)	NM
2018	Mediterranean Games	Tarragona, Spain	2nd	Discus throw	62.03 m
2018	World U20 Championships	Tampere, Finland	15th (q)	Discus throw (1.75 kg)	56.47 m
2019	European Throwing Cup (U23)	Šamorín, Slovakia	1st	Discus throw	62.90 m
2019	European U23 Championships	Gävle, Sweden	1st	Discus throw	63.82 m
2019	World Championships	Doha, Qatar	31st (q)	Discus throw	59.55 m
2021	Olympic Games	Tokyo, Japan	5th	Discus throw	66.62 m
2022	World Championships	Eugene, United States	1st	Discus throw	71.13 m CR
2022	European Championships	Munich, Germany	2nd	Discus throw	68.28 m
2023	World Championships	Budapest, Hungary	2nd	Discus throw	70.02 m
2024	European Championships	Rome, Italy	1st	Discus throw	68.08 m
2024	Olympic Games	Paris, France	4th	Discus throw	68.41 m
2025	World Championships	Tokyo, Japan	8th	Discus throw	63.07 m
2026	European Championships	Birmingham, United Kingdom	1st	Discus throw	72.51 m CR
2026	Mediterranean Games	Taranto, Italy	1st	Discus throw	68.70 m
