= Henrik Janssen =

German athlete (born 1998)

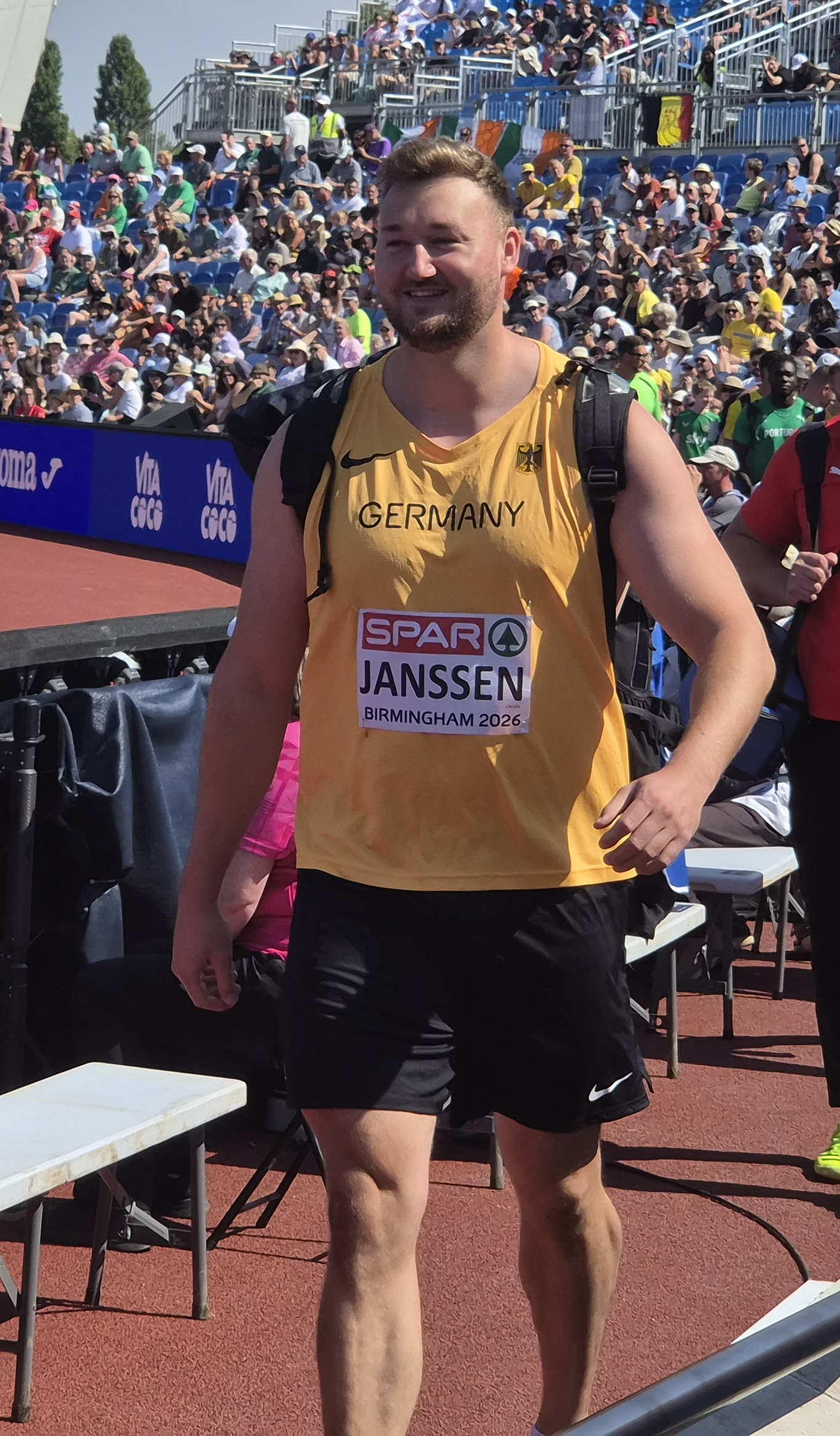
- Janssen at the 2026 European Championships

Personal information
- Nationality: German
- Born: 19 May 1998 (age 28)

Sport
- Sport: Athletics
- Event: Discus

Achievements and titles
- Personal bests: Discus: 69.94m (RAMONA, 2025)
Medal record
Men's athletics
Representing Germany
European Championships
Bronze medal – third place	2026 Birmingham	Discus throw
European Throwing Cup
Gold medal – first place	2025 Nicosia	Discus Throw

Henrik Janssen (born 19 May 1998) is a German discus thrower. He was the German national champion in 2023 and won the bronze medal at the 2026 European Championships. He competed at the 2024 Olympic Games, and the 2023 and 2025 World Athletics Championships. He won the 2025 European Throwing Cup.

== Biography ==
He threw a 62.60 metres distance to qualify for the final at the 2022 European Athletics Championships in Munich, Germany. He finished tenth place overall with a 61.11 meters throw in the final.

He finished second at the 2023 European Athletics Team Championships in Chorzów, Poland, in June 2023, throwing over 64 metres. On 9 July 2023 he became German champion, throwing 63.93 metres in Kassel.

He finished in eighth place at the 2023 World Athletics Championships in Budapest, Hungary in August 2023, with a top throw of 63.80 metres, having qualified for the final with a throw of 63.79 metres.

Competing in Germany in May 2024, he threw a lifetime best of 67.43 metres to meet the 2024 Paris Olympics standard, and three days later won at a meet in Halle. On 2 June 2024, he finished fourth at the 2024 Diamond League event in Stockholm, Sweden with 65.85 metres.

He was selected for the 2024 European Athletics Championships in Rome, Italy, where he a made a 65.09 metres throw in the first round and managed an improvement with a distance of 65.48 metres in the final round to place fifth overall. He competed in the discus throw at the 2024 Summer Olympics in Paris, France in August 2024, but recorded no mark in his throws and did not proceed to the final.

He won the gold medal at the 2025 European Throwing Cup in Nicosia, Cyprus, with a best throw of 64.43 metres. He finished fourth in the discus in May 2025 at the 2025 Doha Diamond League. He finished fifth in Stockholm at the 2025 BAUHAUS-galan event, part of the 2025 Diamond League, in June 2025. He placed sixth at the Diamond League Final in Zurich on 28 August.

In September 2025, he was a finalist in the discus throw at the 2025 World Championships in Tokyo, Japan, without registering a distance in the final. Janssen and teammate Steven Richter both received a three-month suspended ban from the Athletics Integrity Unit (AIU), backdated to September 2025, having placed small bets on athletics totalling €100 for Janssen. A "lack of education on betting" rules was considered as "one of several mitigating factors in arriving at the sanctions" alongside early admission, genuine remorse, and having previously possessed a clean disciplinary record.

Janssen won the bronze medal in the discus at the 2026 European Championships in Birmingham, England with a season's best throw of 69.53 metres. At the 2026 Diamond League Final in Brussels in September, he finished sixth with 66.30 metres.
