= Martynas Alekna =

Lithuanian athlete (born 2000)

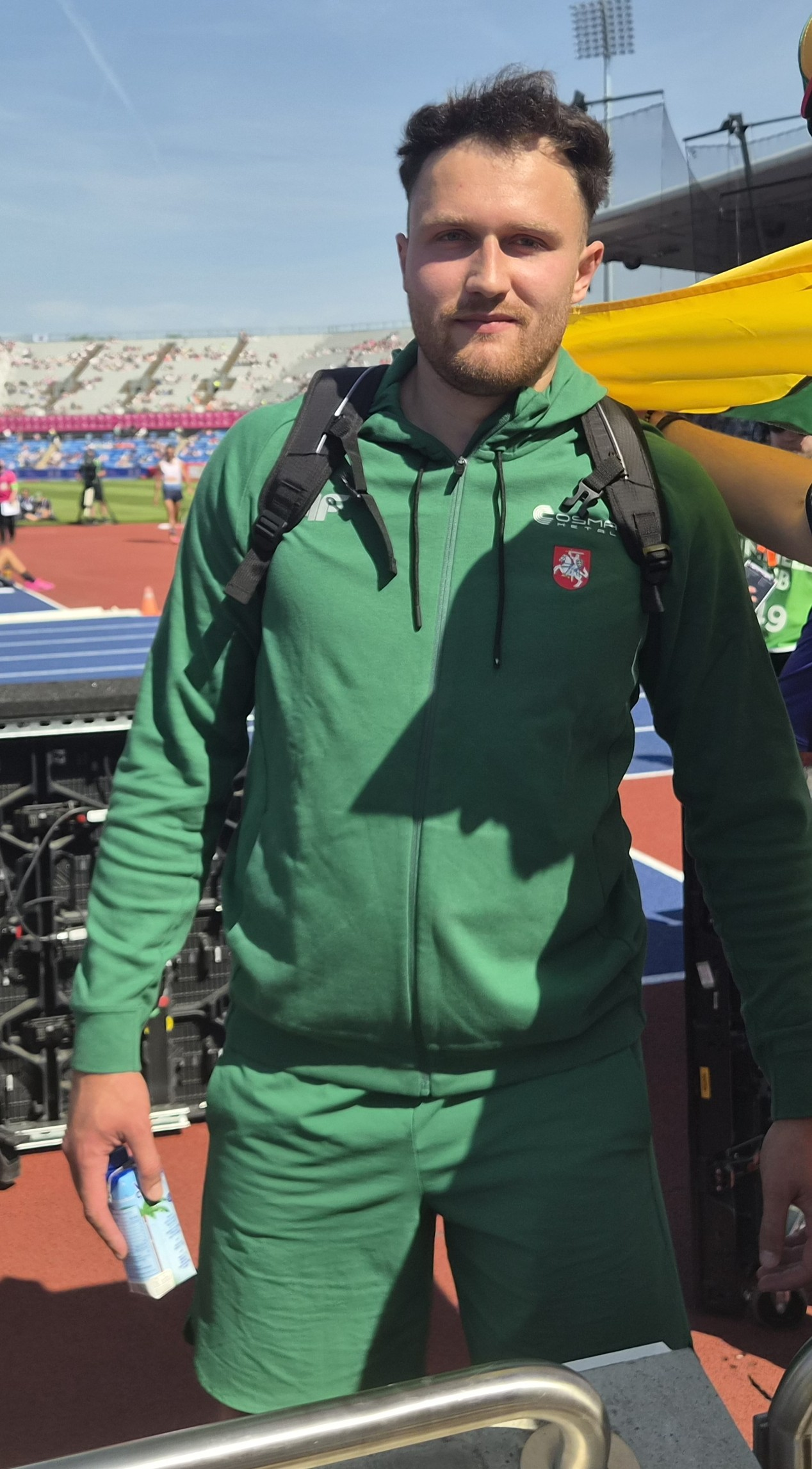
- Alekna at the 2026 European Championships

Personal information
- Nationality: Lithuanian
- Born: 25 August 2000 (age 25)

Sport
- Sport: Athletics
- Event: Discus

Achievements and titles
- Personal bests: Discus 67.23 m (Jelgava, 2023)
Medal record
Men's athletics
Representing Lithuania
European Throwing Cup
Bronze medal – third place	2025 Nicosia	Discus Throw

Martynas Alekna (born 25 August 2000) is a Lithuanian discus thrower. He represented Lithuania at the 2024 Olympic Games and was a bronze medalist at the 2025 European Throwing Cup. He is the son of former Olympic champion Virgilijus Alekna and the brother of world record holder Mykolas Alekna.

== Early life ==
He is the son of double Olympic discus throw champion Virgilijus Alekna and older brother of Mykolas Alekna. Aged 15 years-old, he won the Lithuanian U18 national championships in the discus.

== Career ==
=== 2023 ===
He had a personal best distance of 67.23 in Jelgava, Latvia in June 2023. He finished in second place at the Lithuanian national championships in July 2023. He subsequently competed for Lithuania at the 2023 World Athletics Championships in Budapest, Hungary, in August 2023, throwing best of 62.57 metres.

=== 2024 ===
He finished second at the Canaries International in Tenerife, Spain in May 2024 with a distance of 66.59 metres. He finished ninth at the 2024 Diamond League event 2024 Meeting International Mohammed VI d'Athlétisme in Marrakesh, Morocco with a throw of 63.93 metres. He competed in the discus throw at the 2024 Summer Olympics in Paris, France in August 2024, with a best throw of 58.66 metres, which was not sufficient to progress to the final.

=== 2025 ===
In March 2025, he finished with a bronze medal after placing third in the men's discus at the 2025 European Throwing Cup in Nicosia, Cyprus with a best throw of 63.96 metres. In September 2025, he competed in the discus throw at the 2025 World Championships in Tokyo, Japan, qualifying for the final and placing seventh overall.

=== 2026 ===
In August, he was a finalist competing at the 2026 European Athletics Championships in Birmingham, England, placing twelfth overall in the discus throw.

== Personal life ==
His brother Mykolas Alekna is also a discus thrower. His sister Gabrielė Aleknaitė is a long jumper.
