= Ruben Rolvink =

Dutch discus thrower

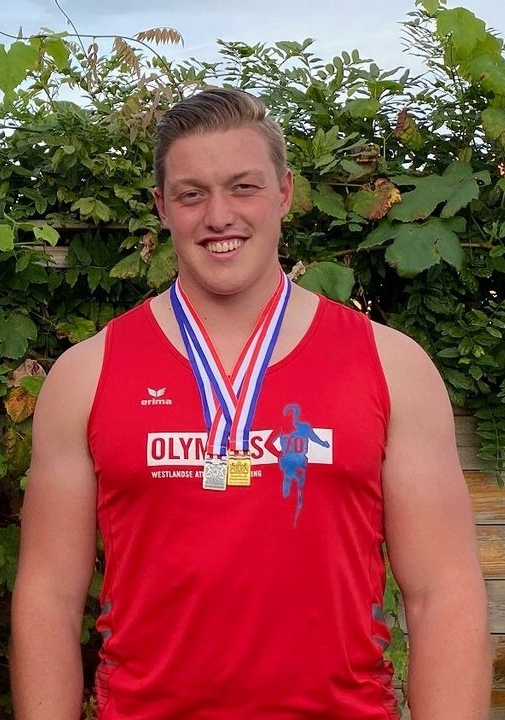

Personal information
- Born: 25 August 2002 (age 23)

Sport
- Sport: Athletics
- Event: Discus

Achievements and titles
- Personal best: Discus 71.22 (2026) NR
Medal record
Men's athletics
Representing the Netherlands
European Throwing Cup
Bronze medal – third place	2026 Nicosia	Discus

Ruben Rolvink (born 25 August 2002) is a Dutch discus thrower. He is a multiple-time champion at the Dutch Athletics Championships. He set the Dutch national record of 71,22m in Ramona (US) in May 2026 which also makes him the best left-handed discus thrower in the world.

== Early and personal life ==
He is from Naaldwijk and is two metres tall. He started in athletics at the age of nine-years old. He is a left-handed discus thrower. His younger brother Yannick Rolvink also competes as a discus thrower.

== Career ==
He set the Dutch junior record of 68.76 metres for the 1.75 kg discus throw.

As a senior he won gold at the Dutch Athletics Championships in 2021, 2022, 2023, 2025 and 2026.

He won a bronze medal at the European Throwing Cup in 2022, 2024 and 2026.

He competed at the senior 2024 European Athletics Championships in Rome, Italy, with his best throw of 58.74 metres in qualification.

In September 2025, he competed in the discus throw at the 2025 World Championships in Tokyo, Japan, without advancing to the final.

In May 2026, over consecutive days, he improved the Dutch national record twice, throwing 70.23 metres and then 71.22 metres in discus throw while competing in Ramona, USA.. With this throw he became the first Dutch athlete to cross the 70m mark. In July, he threw 67.21 metres to win the discus title at the Dutch Outdoor Championships. In August, he competed at the 2026 European Athletics Championships in Birmingham, England, placing seventh overall in the discus throw.
