= Lawrence Okoye =

British discus thrower and American football player (born 1991)

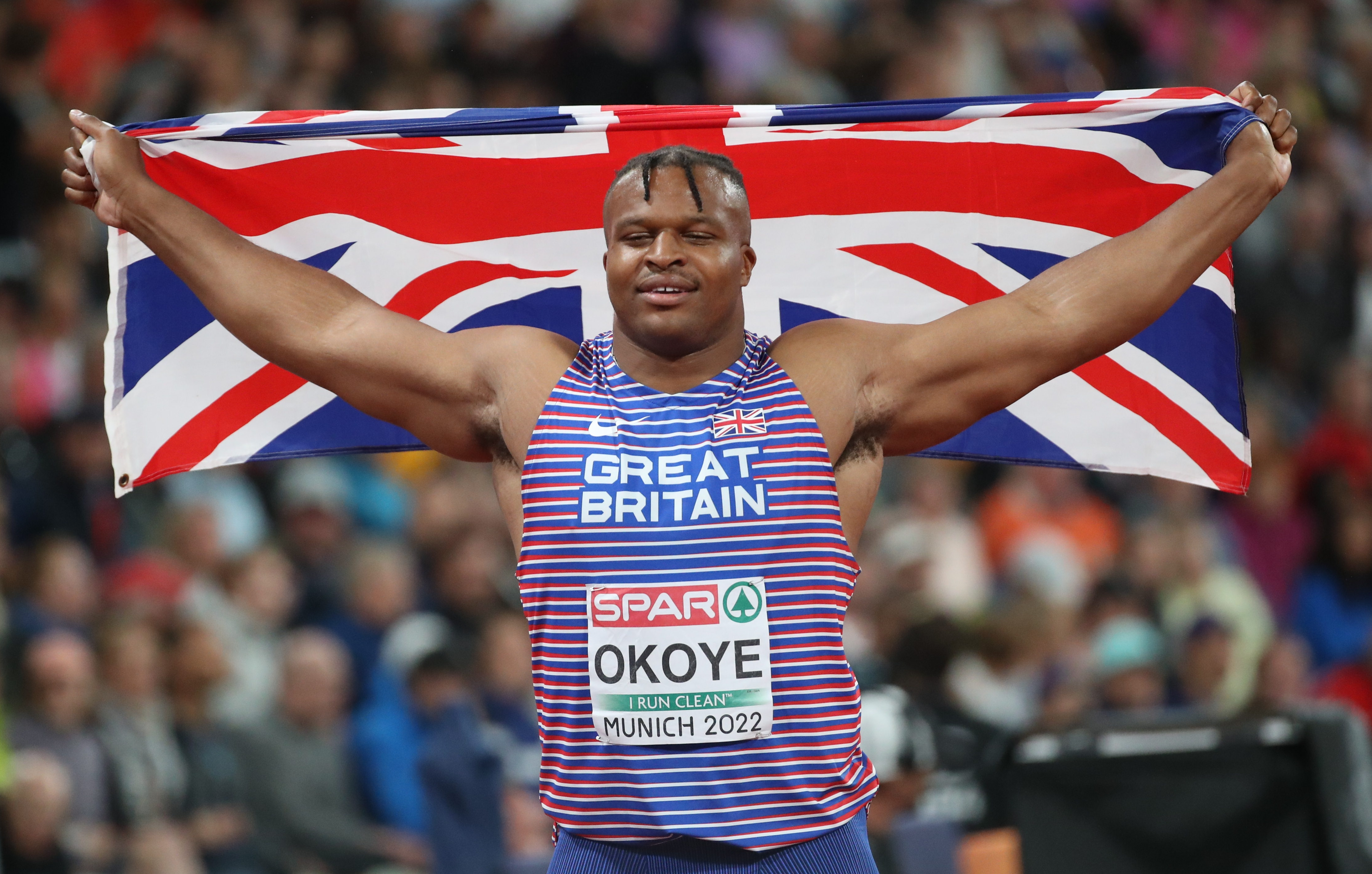
- Okoye in 2022

Personal information
- Nationality: British (English)
- Born: 6 October 1991 (age 35) Croydon, London, England
- Height: 1.98 m (6 ft 6 in)
- Weight: 138 kg (304 lb)

Sport
- Sport: Track and field
- Event: Discus throw
- Club: Croydon Harriers

Achievements and titles
- Personal best: 71.88 m
Medal record
Men's athletics
Representing Great Britain
European Championships
Bronze medal – third place	2022 Munich	Discus throw
European U23 Championships
Gold medal – first place	2011 Ostrava	Discus throw
Representing England
Commonwealth Games
Silver medal – second place	2022 Birmingham	Discus throw
Bronze medal – third place	2026 Glasgow	Discus throw

Lawrence Okoye
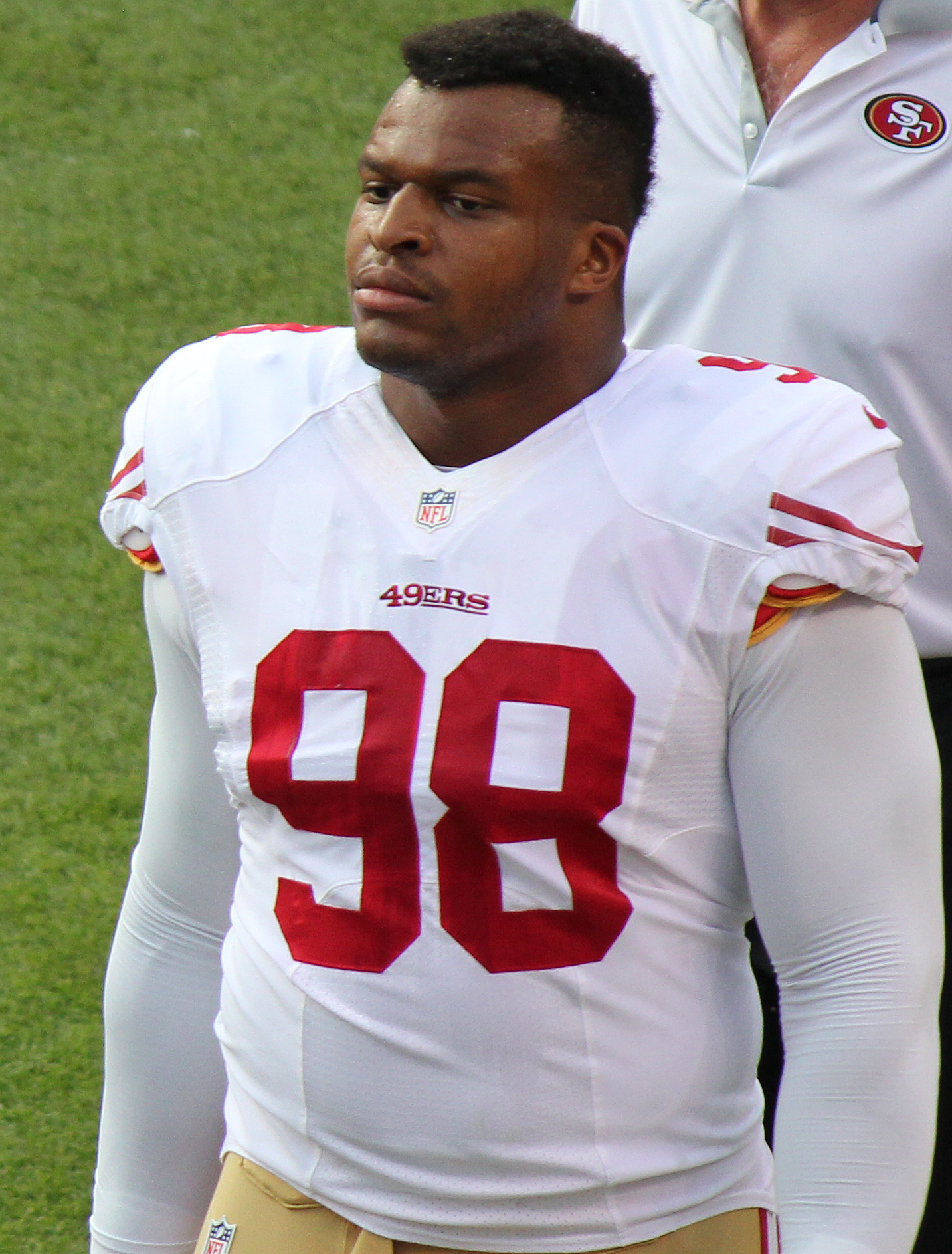
- Okoye with the San Francisco 49ers in 2015

No. 78, 98
- Position: Defensive tackle

Personal information
- Born: 6 October 1991 (age 35); Croydon, London, England
- Listed height: 6 ft 6 in (1.98 m)
- Listed weight: 310 lb (141 kg)

Career information
- High school: London (UK) Whitgift
- NFL draft: 2013: undrafted

Career history
- San Francisco 49ers (2013–2014); Arizona Cardinals (2015)*; New York Jets (2015–2016)*; Dallas Cowboys (2016)*; Chicago Bears (2016)*; Miami Dolphins (2017)*; Montreal Alouettes (2017); Birmingham Iron (2019)
- * Offseason or practice squad member only
- Stats at Pro Football Reference

Lawrence Okoye (born 6 October 1991) is a British track and field athlete and former American football defensive tackle. He is the British record holder in the discus event, and a five-time British champion in the event as of 2026. Okoye became the first ever British athlete to win a medal in Discus at a European Championships during Munich 2022. He has also played rugby union.

== Personal life ==
Born in Croydon in South London to Nigerian parents, Okoye was educated at St Mary's Roman Catholic Junior School, a voluntary aided Roman Catholic state primary school in Croydon, followed by Whitgift School, an independent school for boys, also in Croydon.

Okoye is an honorary member of the St Peter's College JCR, and has an offer from the University of Oxford to study law which he is keen to take up in the future.

He played rugby union as a winger for Whitgift School playing in the Daily Mail Schools Rugby Under 18 final at Twickenham in 2010, and was also a member of the academy teams of both London Irish and London Wasps.

Okoye was arrested on 6 February 2019 as part of a reverse prostitution sting in Shelby County, Alabama, four days before the kickoff of the Birmingham Iron's inaugural season. The charges were later dropped.

== Discus ==
Okoye began training full-time in the discus in September 2010 after a promising career as a junior rugby union player. In his first international outing he came sixth in the discus throw at the 2010 World Junior Championships in Athletics. He won a gold medal at the 2011 European Athletics U23 Championships in July 2011 at the age of 19.

Later on that season, Okoye threw a new British record of 67.63m at the McCain Jumps & Throws Fest. He then bettered that mark with another British record of 68.24m at the Hallesche Werfertage meeting in May 2012.

In the 2012 Summer Olympics, Okoye competed in the discus, reaching the final with a throw of 65.28m. In the final, he finished in twelfth place with a throw of 61.03m. After the competition, he expressed disappointment with his placing in the final.

After leaving American football, Okoye competed in the 2019 Anniversary Games. This was his first competition since 2012. His best result of 2019 was 60.80 m at the Olympic Stadium on 21 July 2019. In 2020, his season best was 65.15 m in Magdeburg and in 2021, 65.56 m in Winchester before he won the discus event at 2021 European Athletics Team Championships. In 2022 he won the silver medal in the Birmingham Commonwealth Games and Bronze in the European Championships in Munich.

In 2024 Okoye was one of 155 men selected to Great Britain's Team to compete in the Paris 2024 Summer Olympics and finished the year with a best throw of 67.05 in Zagreb, Croatia. In 2025 Okoye throws 70.76m to break his own men's discus record almost 13 years after setting the previous one.

He finished third at the 2025 European Athletics Team Championships First Division in Madrid on 28 June 2025, with a first round effort of 65.83 metres.

In April 2026, Okoye set a new British national record with a discus throw of 71.88m in Ramona, Oklahoma.

Okoye is a five-times British discus throw champion after winning the British Athletics Championships in 2012 and following his return from American football, in 2021, 2023, 2025 and 2026.

== NFL career ==
=== 2013 NFL Combine ===
Pre-draft measurables
Height	Weight	40-yard dash	10-yard split	20-yard split	20-yard shuttle	Three-cone drill	Vertical jump	Broad jump	Bench press
6 ft 6 in (1.98 m)	304 lb (138 kg)	4.78 s	1.67 s	2.75 s	4.65 s	6.69 s	36 in (0.91 m)	10 ft 7 in (3.23 m)	30 reps
All values from Central Florida Pro Day.

=== 2013 NFL draft ===
In March 2013, Okoye announced his intentions to play in the National Football League, despite having never played American football at school or university; he stated that five NFL teams expressed interest in him, and planned to sign after the 2013 NFL draft. At the NFL Super Regional Combine, Okoye ran the 40-yard dash in 4.78 seconds, while scoring 36 inches on the vertical jump and 10 feet, 7 inches on the broad jump. Okoye was signed on 27 April by the San Francisco 49ers.

=== San Francisco 49ers ===
On 27 August 2013, Okoye was placed on Injured Reserve after sustaining an injury in the pre-season.

On 31 August 2014, the 49ers announced that Okoye was added to the practice squad.

On 31 August 2015, Okoye was waived in order for the 49ers to make the 53-man roster.

=== Arizona Cardinals ===
On 7 September 2015, Arizona Cardinals signed Okoye to their practice squad.

On 21 October 2015, the Cardinals released Okoye from their practice squad. Head coach Bruce Arians said that a leading reason for Okoye's release was because Okoye parked his car in Arians's parking spot at team facilities.

=== New York Jets ===
On 13 November 2015, New York Jets signed Okoye to their practice squad.

Okoye signed a reserve/future contract on 11 January 2016.

The Jets released Okoye on 1 June 2016.

=== Dallas Cowboys ===
Cowboys signed Okoye on 8 June 2016, but he was released on 3 September 2016 during final roster cuts.

=== Chicago Bears ===
On 23 November 2016, Okoye was signed to the Bears' practice squad.

=== Miami Dolphins ===
On 12 January 2017, Okoye signed a reserve/future contract with the Dolphins. He was waived on 2 September 2017.

== CFL career ==
=== Montreal Alouettes ===
On 18 September 2017, Okoye signed to the practice squad of Montreal Alouettes of the Canadian Football League. He was put on the active roster and played his first CFL game on 29 September against the Calgary Stampeders, recording one tackle. He was released on 8 October 2017 and re-signed by the Alouettes on 19 May 2018.

== AAF career ==
=== Birmingham Iron ===
On 12 October 2018, Okoye signed for the Birmingham Iron of the Alliance of American Football ahead of the inaugural season of the League in 2019. He made the 52-man roster on 30 January 2019. He was placed on injured reserve on 20 February 2019. The league ceased operations in April 2019.
