= Ramona, Oklahoma =

- Town
- Nickname: Throw Town
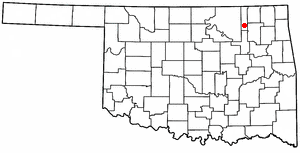
- Location of Ramona, Oklahoma
- Coordinates: 36°32′08″N 95°55′35″W
- Country: United States
- State: Oklahoma
- County: Washington

Area
  - Total: 0.82 sq mi (2.13 km^{2})
  - Land: 0.82 sq mi (2.12 km^{2})
  - Water: 0 sq mi (0.00 km^{2})
- Elevation: 630 ft (190 m)

Population (2020)
  - Total: 524
  - Density: 639/sq mi (246.6/km^{2})
- Time zone: UTC-6 (Central (CST))
  - Summer (DST): UTC-5 (CDT)
- ZIP code: 74061
- Area codes: 539/918
- FIPS code: 40-61700
- GNIS feature ID: 2412524

Ramona is a town in Washington County, Oklahoma, United States. As of the 2020 census, Ramona had a population of 524. The town is also nicknamed as "Throw Town" due to the favorable wind conditions for discus throwers.

== History ==
The town began as Bon-Ton, but changed its name to Ramona in 1899 in honor of the Helen Hunt Jackson novel of the same name.

Ramona was an oil town and was also a stop for the Santa Fe railroad. When the oil dried up, there was no other industry to support Ramona, so the town began to die out. Very little business remains in the town, aside from a garage, a bank, a medical clinic, and a diner, and sundry other small businesses. For 30 years the town was under the jurisdiction of the Washington County Sheriff's Office, after the police department disbanded and the Chief of Police was sentenced to prison. Under the leadership of the former mayor, the late Robert Fiddler, the police department was reinstated. And the water lines were repaired/replaced by the late William Fugate. a grant was accepted from the Cherokee Nation to repave the streets. The town also supplies natural gas service to the Wal-Mart distribution center five miles north of town.

Recently, under the mayoralty of Cyle Miller, the Cherokee Nation opened the Cherokee Casino Ramona off U.S. Route 75 and Road 3200, which is a significant boom to the local economy. This led to Ramona annexing a considerable portion of land and greatly increasing the size of Ramona proper.

== Geography ==
According to the United States Census Bureau, the town has a total area of 0.8 square miles (2.1 km^{2}), all land.

== Demographics ==
Historical population
Census	Pop.	Note	%±
1910	725		—
1920	793		9.4%
1930	617		−22.2%
1940	574		−7.0%
1950	583		1.6%
1960	546		−6.3%
1970	600		9.9%
1980	567		−5.5%
1990	508		−10.4%
2000	564		11.0%
2010	535		−5.1%
2020	524		−2.1%
U.S. Decennial Census

=== 2020 census ===
As of the 2020 census, Ramona had a population of 524. The median age was 37.8 years. 26.5% of residents were under the age of 18 and 17.0% of residents were 65 years of age or older. For every 100 females there were 97.7 males, and for every 100 females age 18 and over there were 94.4 males age 18 and over.

0.0% of residents lived in urban areas, while 100.0% lived in rural areas.

There were 210 households in Ramona, of which 39.5% had children under the age of 18 living in them. Of all households, 41.4% were married-couple households, 23.8% were households with a male householder and no spouse or partner present, and 27.6% were households with a female householder and no spouse or partner present. About 24.7% of all households were made up of individuals and 10.9% had someone living alone who was 65 years of age or older.

There were 245 housing units, of which 14.3% were vacant. The homeowner vacancy rate was 2.0% and the rental vacancy rate was 0.0%.

Racial composition as of the 2020 census
Race	Number	Percent
White	326	62.2%
Black or African American	5	1.0%
American Indian and Alaska Native	105	20.0%
Asian	3	0.6%
Native Hawaiian and Other Pacific Islander	0	0.0%
Some other race	3	0.6%
Two or more races	82	15.6%
Hispanic or Latino (of any race)	16	3.1%

=== 2000 census ===
As of the census of 2000, there were 564 people, 245 households, and 161 families residing in the town. The population density was 735.6 inhabitants per square mile (284.0/km^{2}). There were 265 housing units at an average density of 345.6 per square mile (133.4/km^{2}). The racial makeup of the town was 72.70% White, 0.18% African American, 14.72% Native American, 0.18% from other races, and 12.23% from two or more races. Hispanic or Latino of any race were 1.24% of the population.

There were 245 households, out of which 31.0% had children under the age of 18 living with them, 48.2% were married couples living together, 13.5% had a female householder with no husband present, and 33.9% were non-families. 32.7% of all households were made up of individuals, and 18.4% had someone living alone who was 65 years of age or older. The average household size was 2.30 and the average family size was 2.84.

In the town, the population was spread out, with 25.4% under the age of 18, 10.3% from 18 to 24, 26.8% from 25 to 44, 19.0% from 45 to 64, and 18.6% who were 65 years of age or older. The median age was 37 years. For every 100 females, there were 90.5 males. For every 100 females age 18 and over, there were 89.6 males.

The median income for a household in the town was $26,667, and the median income for a family was $36,667. Males had a median income of $27,361 versus $24,375 for females. The per capita income for the town was $14,393. About 10.2% of families and 14.7% of the population were below the poverty line, including 16.5% of those under age 18 and 25.9% of those age 65 or over.

== Education ==
The town is one of four communities that makes up the consolidated Caney Valley School District.

== Notable people ==
- Gary Ward, college baseball coach
