= 2025 European Athletics U23 Championships – Men's discus throw =

Men's discus throw at the 2025 European Athletics U23 Championships
- Venue: Fana Stadion
- Location: Bergen, Norway
- Dates: 17 July (qualification); 18 July (final)
- Competitors: 20 from 12 nations
- Winning distance: 64.67 m

Medalists
gold medal	Steven Richter	Germany
silver medal	Miká Sosna	Germany
bronze medal	Marius Karges	Germany

The men's discus throw event at the 2025 European Athletics U23 Championships was held in Bergen, Norway, at Fana Stadion on 17 and 18 July.

== Records ==
Prior to the competition, the records were as follows:

Record	Athlete (nation)	Distance (m)	Location	Date
European U23 record	Mykolas Alekna (LTU)	74.35 m	Ramona, United States	14 April 2024
Championship U23 record	Mykolas Alekna (LTU)	68.34 m	Espoo, Finland	15 July 2023

== Results ==
=== Qualification ===
All athletes over 59.00 m (Q) or at least the 12 best performers (q) advance to the final.

==== Group A ====
Place	Athlete	Nation	#1	#2	#3	Result	Notes
1	Miká Sosna	Germany	60.78			60.78 m	Q
2	Marius Karges	Germany	53.48	55.55	59.96	59.96 m	Q
3	Mykhailo Brudin	Ukraine	57.90	59.01		59.01 m	Q
4	Marcos Moreno	Spain	58.17	55.57	55.74	58.17 m	q
5	Wojtek Lewkowicz	Poland	x	54.20	54.86	54.86 m	q
6	Steffen Melheim	Norway	51.85	54.00	54.76	54.76 m	q
7	Iosif Papa	Cyprus	x	53.96	x	53.96 m	
8	Artemios Adamakis	Greece	51.62	51.07	53.14	53.14 m	
9	Hendrik Kookmaa	Estonia	52.69	53.13	53.13	53.13 m	
10	Adam Hellbom	Sweden	46.56	50.46	x	50.46 m	

==== Group B ====
Place	Athlete	Nation	#1	#2	#3	Result	Notes
1	Steven Richter	Germany	57.14	63.59		63.59 m	Q
2	Dimitrios Pavlidis	Greece	59.74			59.74 m	Q
3	Damian Rodziak	Poland	58.82	55.25	x	58.82 m	q
4	Philipp Schmidli	Switzerland	53.89	55.59	55.52	55.59 m	q
5	Konstantinos Bouzakis	Greece	52.29	54.77	55.29	55.29 m	q
6	Håkon Hansesæter	Norway	55.15	54.46	53.58	55.15 m	q
7	Anders Vik	Norway	51.61	51.08	50.37	51.61 m	
8	Jesper Ahlin	Sweden	x	x	51.08	51.08 m	
9	Stefano Marmonti	Italy	x	49.53	50.33	50.33 m	
10	Juho Suominen	Finland	44.86	46.26	x	46.26 m	

=== Final ===
Place	Athlete	Nation	#1	#2	#3	#4	#5	#6	Result	Notes
1st place, gold medalist(s)	Steven Richter	Germany	62.31	64.60	64.67	62.12	x	60.68	64.67 m	
2nd place, silver medalist(s)	Miká Sosna	Germany	62.48	63.42	x	x	x	60.34	63.42 m	
3rd place, bronze medalist(s)	Marius Karges	Germany	46.02	60.86	60.83	61.77	60.64	62.20	62.20 m	
4	Mykhailo Brudin	Ukraine	57.45	57.11	59.34	58.63	59.85	x	59.85 m	SB
5	Dimitrios Pavlidis	Greece	x	57.25	58.99	58.51	x	x	58.99 m	
6	Damian Rodziak	Poland	52.31	52.94	58.59	x	x	54.42	58.59 m	
7	Marcos Moreno	Spain	58.07	x	54.71	56.27	55.32	55.47	58.07 m	
8	Konstantinos Bouzakis	Greece	53.91	55.10	53.96	54.11	55.26	55.13	55.26 m	
9	Håkon Hansesæter	Norway	51.37	x	54.61				54.61 m	
10	Steffen Melheim	Norway	53.75	x	53.35				53.75 m	
11	Philipp Schmidli	Switzerland	50.76	52.70	52.23				52.70 m	
12	Wojtek Lewkowicz	Poland	x	50.73	50.71				50.73 m	
