= 2021 World Athletics U20 Championships – Men's javelin throw =

Men's javelin throw at the 2021 World Athletics U20 Championships
- Venue: Kasarani Stadium
- Dates: 18 August (qualification); 20 August (final)
- Competitors: 18 from 14 nations
- Winning distance: 76.46 m

Medalists
gold medal	Janne Läspä	Finland
silver medal	Artur Felfner	Ukraine
bronze medal	Chinecherem Nnamdi	Nigeria

The men's javelin throw at the 2021 World Athletics U20 Championships was held at the Kasarani Stadium on 18 and 20 August.

== Records ==
Standing records prior to the 2021 World Athletics U20 Championships
World U20 Record	Neeraj Chopra (IND)	86.48	Bydgoszcz, Poland	23 July 2016
Championship Record	Neeraj Chopra (IND)	86.48	Bydgoszcz, Poland	23 July 2016
World U20 Leading	Artur Felfner (UKR)	78.41	Tallinn, Estonia	17 July 2021

== Results ==
=== Qualification ===
The qualification took place on 18 August, in two groups, with Group A starting at 16:13 and Group B starting at 17:09. Athletes attaining a mark of at least 73.00 metres ( Q ) or at least the 12 best performers ( q ) qualified for the final.

Rank	Group	Name	Nationality	Round			Mark	Notes
Rank	Group	Name	Nationality	1	2	3	Mark	Notes
1	A	Chinecherem Nnamdi	Nigeria	x	69.39	78.02	78.02	Q, NU20R
2	B	Artur Felfner	Ukraine	72.89	77.15		77.15	Q
3	B	Janne Läspä	Finland	69.88	77.10		77.10	Q, PB
4	A	Filip Dominković	Slovenia	65.80	73.82		73.82	Q, PB
5	A	Eryk Kołodziejczak	Poland	71.73	66.70	x	71.73	q
6	A	Kunwer Ajai Raj Singh Rana	India	70.69	71.05	70.48	71.05	q
7	B	Jay Kumar	India	70.34	63.11	70.11	70.34	q
8	A	Keyshawn Strachan	Bahamas	68.11	68.85	x	68.85	q
9	B	Zander van der Merwe	South Africa	68.56	65.13	63.40	68.56	q
10	B	Lenny Brisseault	France	68.39	65.67	66.62	68.39	q
11	B	Marius Rudzevičius	Lithuania	60.48	x	67.51	67.51	q
12	A	Onni Ruokangas	Finland	67.15	x	66.33	67.15	q
13	B	Wilson Ldimaiye	Kenya	62.24	66.71	59.16	66.71	PB
14	B	Giovanni Frattini	Italy	65.53	66.52	63.81	66.52	
15	A	Michele Fina	Italy	65.61	x	63.89	65.61	
16	A	Armant van der Linden	South Africa	59.24	63.02	64.39	64.39	
17	B	Oğuzhan Usta	Turkey	62.20	x	61.73	62.20	
18	A	Callan Saldutto	Canada	54.87	x	58.41	58.41	

=== Final ===
The final was held on 20 August at 14:19.

Rank	Name	Nationality	Round						Mark	Notes
Rank	Name	Nationality	1	2	3	4	5	6	Mark	Notes
1st place, gold medalist(s)	Janne Läspä	Finland	x	73.25	76.46	–	74.03	x	76.46	
2nd place, silver medalist(s)	Artur Felfner	Ukraine	76.31	x	73.49	76.32	74.21	x	76.32	
3rd place, bronze medalist(s)	Chinecherem Nnamdi	Nigeria	70.57	72.63	73.49	74.48	73.72	68.18	74.48	
4	Eryk Kołodziejczak	Poland	70.09	72.06	70.72	71.79	74.06	73.23	74.06	
5	Kunwer Ajai Raj Singh Rana	India	69.44	70.36	70.09	73.68	71.96	x	73.68	
6	Jay Kumar	India	67.60	69.02	70.28	69.41	65.16	70.74	70.74	
7	Keyshawn Strachan	Bahamas	64.97	70.30	68.35	70.00	69.45	68.21	70.30	
8	Zander van der Merwe	South Africa	63.28	x	69.34	63.40	59.46	61.49	69.34	
9	Lenny Brisseault	France	64.79	65.85	68.37				68.37	
10	Marius Rudzevičius	Lithuania	64.08	62.43	63.49				64.08	
11	Filip Dominković	Slovenia	x	x	64.03				64.03	
12	Onni Ruokangas	Finland	x	x	63.42				63.42	
