= Athletics at the 2025 Summer World University Games – Men's javelin throw =

Men's javelin throw at the 2025 Summer World University Games
- Venue: Lohrheidestadion
- Location: Bochum, Germany
- Dates: 24 July (qualification); 25 July (final)
- Competitors: 25 from 21 nations
- Winning distance: 79.33 m SB

Medalists
gold medal	Simon Wieland	Switzerland
silver medal	Nick Thumm	Germany
bronze medal	Topias Laine	Finland

The men's javelin throw event at the 2025 Summer World University Games was held in Bochum, Germany, at Lohrheidestadion on 24 and 25 July.

== Records ==
Prior to the competition, the records were as follows:

Record	Athlete (nation)	Distance (m)	Location	Date
Games record	Cheng Chao-tsun (TPE)	91.36 m	Taipei, Taiwan	26 August 2017

== Results ==
=== Qualification ===
All athletes over 80.50 m (Q) or at least the 12 best performers (q) advance to the final.

==== Group A ====
Place	Athlete	Nation	#1	#2	#3	Result	Notes
1	Topias Laine	Finland	76.44	-	-	76.44 m	q
2	Giovanni Frattini	Italy	74.97	x	62.58	74.97 m	q
3	Simon Wieland	Switzerland	71.08	73.85	71.16	73.85 m	q
4	Alexandr Čača	Czech Republic	67.92	73.47	69.60	73.47 m	q
5	Oscar Sullivan	Australia	x	71.47	x	71.47 m	q
6	Remi Rougetet	France	70.13	70.77	67.21	70.77 m	
7	Hiroya Kiyokawa	Japan	68.21	69.74	65.13	69.74 m	
8	Sagar	India	69.63	64.09	64.97	69.63 m	
9	Huang Chao-hung	Chinese Taipei	64.17	63.99	68.74	68.74 m	
10	Junseok Jeong	South Korea	58.59	63.05	x	63.05 m	
11	Tristan Aik Sild	Estonia	58.75	57.33	62.51	62.51 m	
12	David Friedberg	United States	59.18	62.12	59.71	62.12 m	

==== Group B ====
Place	Athlete	Nation	#1	#2	#3	Result	Notes
1	Ewald Jansen	South Africa	61.74	75.45	-	75.45 m	q
2	Nick Thumm	Germany	75.39	73.99	-	75.39 m	q
3	Tharuka Alahapperuma	Sri Lanka	74.79	x	-	74.79 m	q, PB
4	Rin Suzuki	Japan	74.01	69.13	66.40	74.01 m	q
5	Iván José Sibaja	Costa Rica	66.43	71.68	64.64	71.68 m	q
6	Sahil Silwal	India	71.60	x	67.93	71.60 m	q
7	Teemu Narvi	Finland	68.47	70.92	71.39	71.39 m	q
8	Franck di Sanza	Switzerland	69.85	68.89	69.04	69.85 m	
9	Jakob Rahm	Sweden	69.49	66.98	68.37	69.49 m	
10	Muhammet Hanifi Zengin	Turkey	68.76	68.93	67.59	68.93 m	
11	Oneyder García	Colombia	60.35	61.96	66.24	66.24 m	PB
12	György Herczeg	Hungary	65.29	65.96	x	65.96 m	
13	Jabbes Mwape	Zambia	36.75	x	37.13	37.13 m	

=== Final ===
Place	Athlete	Nation	#1	#2	#3	#4	#5	#6	Result	Notes
1st place, gold medalist(s)	Simon Wieland	Switzerland	79.33	x	74.48	x	x	x	79.33 m	SB
2nd place, silver medalist(s)	Nick Thumm	Germany	75.85	77.91	74.55	x	-	78.47	78.47 m	
3rd place, bronze medalist(s)	Topias Laine	Finland	73.29	71.11	71.42	72.37	75.57	75.96	75.96 m	
4	Oscar Sullivan	Australia	74.44	67.28	72.08	72.09	72.25	x	74.44 m	
5	Alexandr Čača	Czech Republic	74.30	x	70.64	69.06	x	69.48	74.30 m	
6	Iván José Sibaja	Costa Rica	73.91	73.55	72.87	73.58	x	66.84	73.91 m	
7	Ewald Jansen	South Africa	x	73.90	70.80	69.42	x	70.95	73.90 m	
8	Sahil Silwal	India	67.66	73.76	72.97	73.24	73.22	71.50	73.76 m	
9	Teemu Narvi	Finland	71.96	67.93	69.54				71.96 m	
10	Rin Suzuki	Japan	71.65	65.56	x				71.65 m	
11	Giovanni Frattini	Italy	x	69.97	62.27				69.97 m	
12	Tharuka Alahapperuma	Sri Lanka	x	68.15	65.36				68.15 m	
