= 2024 European Throwing Cup =

Athletics competition

- Location: Leiria, Portugal
- Dates: 9–10 March

The 2024 European Throwing Cup was held from 9 to 10 March 2024 in Leiria, Portugal.

== Results ==
WL - the best result on the world lists in 2024	EL - the best result on European lists in 2024	CR - European Cup record
NR - national record	PB - personal record	SB - the best result of the season

=== Men ===
==== Seniors ====
Event	Gold		Silver		Bronze	
Shot put	Zane Weir; Italy	21.55 WL	Scott Lincoln; Great Britain	20.98	Mesud Pezer; Bosnia and Herzegovina	20.58
Discus throw	Alin Alexandru Firfirică; Romania	66.07	Simon Pettersson; Sweden	63.08	Daniel Jasinski; Germany	61.84
Hammer throw	Mykhaylo Kokhan; Ukraine	78.13	Bence Halász; Hungary	76.22	Hristos Frantzeskakis; Greece	74.96
Javelin throw	Artur Felfner; Ukraine	81.89	Alexandru Novac; Romania	80.73	Ioannis Kiriazis; Greece	80.52

==== U23 ====
Event	Gold		Silver		Bronze	
Shot put	Muhamet Ramadani; Kosovo	18.54	Lukas Schober; Germany	18.21	Ali Peker; Turkey	17.93
Discus throw	Steven Richter; Germany	61.00	Mykhailo Brudin; Ukraine	59.95	Ruben Rolvink; Netherlands	57.96
Hammer throw	Dawid Piłat; Poland	71.52	Iosef Kesides; Cyprus	70.63	Orestis Dousakis; Greece	68.78
Javelin throw	Giovanni Frattini; Italy	76.21	Muhammet Hanifi Zengin; Turkey	76.15	Vlad Alexandru Turcu; Romania	74.51

=== Women ===
==== Seniors ====
Event	Gold		Silver		Bronze	
Shot put	Jessica Schilder; Netherlands	18.22	Julia Ritter; Germany	18.16	Eliana Bandeira; Portugal	17.60
Discus throw	Irina Rodrigues; Portugal	66.60 WL, NR	Shanice Craft; Germany	63.70	Mélina Robert-Michon; France	62.46
Hammer throw	Katrine Koch Jacobsen; Denmark	71.95	Bianca Ghelber; Romania	71.66	Sara Fantini; Italy	70.58
Javelin throw	Marie-Therese Obst; Norway	61.69	Adriana Vilagoš; Serbia	61.17	Eda Tuğsuz; Turkey	60.50

==== U23 ====
Event	Gold		Silver		Bronze	
Shot put	Zuzanna Maślana; Poland	17.08	Milaine Ammon; Germany	16.07	Anastasia Dragomirova; Greece	15.46
Discus throw	Özlem Becerek; Turkey	55.07	Marie-Josée Bovele-Linaka; France	53.91	Emily Conte; Italy	53.72
Hammer throw	Thea Löfman; Sweden	68.08	Nicola Tuthill; Ireland	67.39	Aada Koppeli; Finland	64.88
Javelin throw	Jade Maraval; France	55.07	Emilia Karell; Finland	54.54	Margherita Randazzo; Italy	53.67

== Medal table ==
* Host nation (Portugal)

Rank	Nation	Gold	Silver	Bronze	Total
1	Ukraine	2	1	0	3
2	Italy	2	0	3	5
3	Poland	2	0	0	2
4	Germany	1	4	1	6
5	Romania	1	2	1	4
6	Turkey	1	1	2	4
7	France	1	1	1	3
8	Sweden	1	1	0	2
9	Netherlands	1	0	1	2
9	Portugal*	1	0	1	2
11	Denmark	1	0	0	1
11	Kosovo	1	0	0	1
11	Norway	1	0	0	1
14	Finland	0	1	1	2
15	Cyprus	0	1	0	1
15	Great Britain	0	1	0	1
15	Hungary	0	1	0	1
15	Ireland	0	1	0	1
15	Serbia	0	1	0	1
20	Greece	0	0	4	4
21	Bosnia and Herzegovina	0	0	1	1
Totals (21 entries)		16	16	16	48

== Participating Issue ==
Because of Russian invasion of Ukraine, Russia and Belarus were banned.
