= Michele Fina (javelin thrower) =

Italian javelin thrower (born 2002)

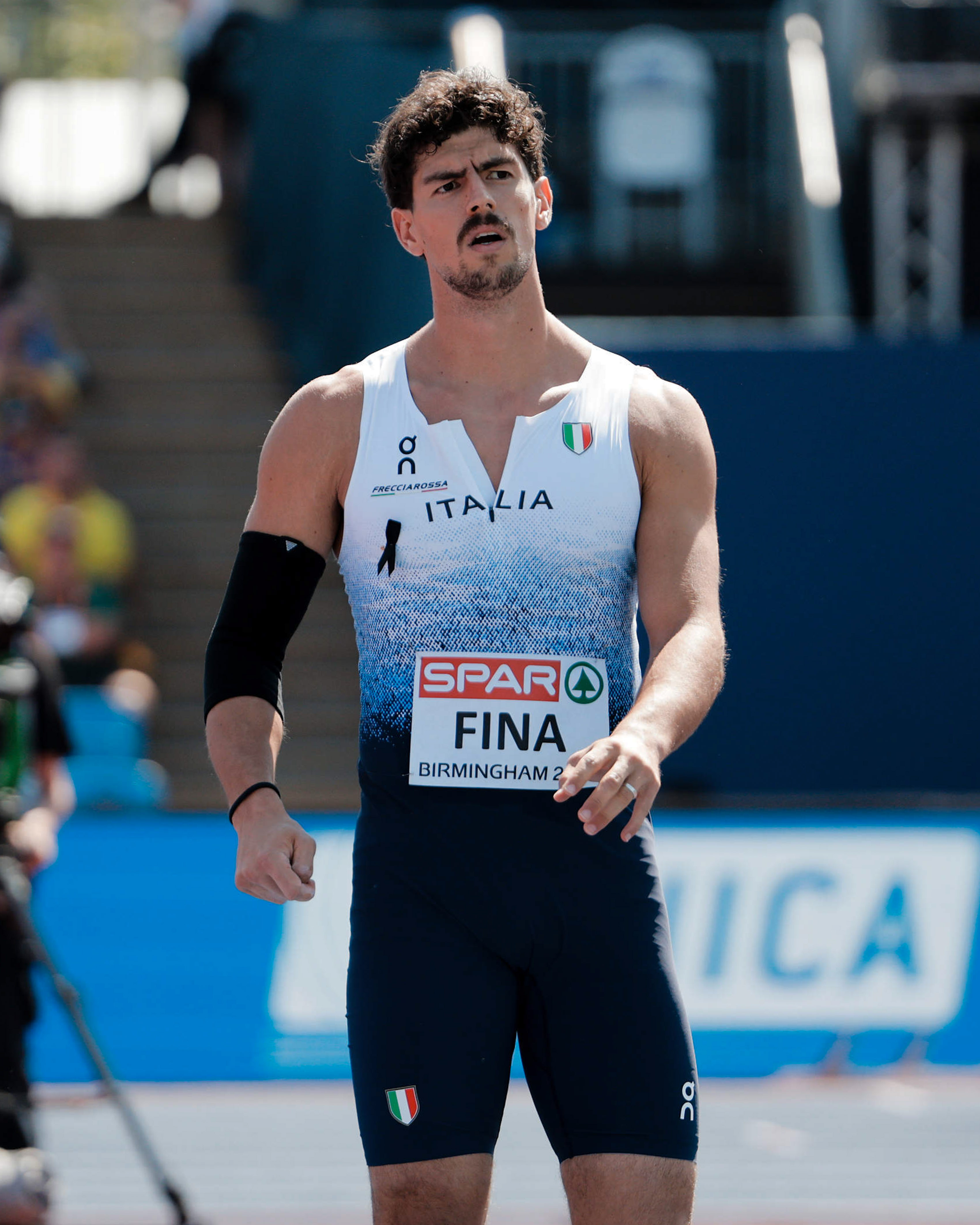
- Fina at Birmingham 2026

Personal information
- National team: Italy
- Born: 9 September 2002 (age 24) San Vito al Tagliamento, Italy
- Height: 1.98 kg
- Weight: 100 kg (220 lb)

Sport
- Sport: Athletics
- Event: Javelin throw
- Club: C.S. Esercito
- Coached by: Carlo Sonego

Achievements and titles
- Personal best: Javelin: 79.95 m (2026)
Medal record
Men's athletics
Representing Italy
European Throwing Cup
Bronze medal – third place	2026 Nicosia	Javelin throw
Mediterranean Games
Silver medal – second place	2026 Taranto	Javelin throw
European U23 Championships
Bronze medal – third place	2023 Espoo	Javelin throw

Michele Fina (born 9 September 2002) is an Italian javelin thrower. He won the bronze medal at the 2026 European Throwing Cup and the 2023 European Athletics U23 Championships.

== Biography ==
Fina is from Fontanafredda, Pordenone. As a member of Nuova Polisportiva Libertas Sacile, Fina set a new Italian national under-16 best in the javelin throw at the age of 14 years-old in 2017, when he threw the 600-gram implement to 66.04 metres to break the previous best was 65.99 set by Valerio Albanesi in 1999.

He later joined Atletica Brugera and began to be trained by the Italian record holder Carlo Sonego. In February 2022, he won the youth title at the Italian Winter Throwing Cup with a throw of 70.76 metres to move to said on the Italian age-group all-time list.

In 2023, Fina moved from Atletica Brugnera to the Army Sports Club while continuing to train with Carlo Sonego. He set a personal best of 75.52 metres in April 2023 in Treviso. Fina won the Italian junior javelin title on 19 June 2023 with a throw of 72.08 metres and represented Italy at the 2023 European Athletics Team Championships, placing fourteenth overall. The following month, Fina won the bronze medal at the 2023 European Athletics U23 Championships in Espoo, Finland, with a personal best of 77.23 metres.

In August 2025, he was runner-up to Giovanni Frattini at the Italian Athletics Championships with a throw of 74.35 metres.

In March 2026, Fina won the bronze medal in the javelin throw at the 2026 European Throwing Cup in Nicosia, Cyprus, where he threw the javelin to 79.95 metres, a personal best of more than two metres, to finish behind Germany's Nick Thumm and Simon Wieland of Switzerland. In August, he competed at the 2026 European Athletics Championships in Birmingham, England, in the javelin throw.

== See also ==
- Italian all-time lists – Javelin throw
