= 2023 European Athletics U23 Championships – Men's javelin throw =

Men's javelin throw at the 2023 European Athletics U23 Championships
- Venue: Leppävaara Stadium
- Location: Espoo, Finland
- Dates: 15 July
- Competitors: 13 from 13 nations
- Winning distance: 83.04 m

Medalists
gold medal	Artur Felfner	Ukraine
silver medal	Topias Laine	Finland
bronze medal	Michele Fina	Italy

The men's javelin throw event at the 2023 European Athletics U23 Championships was held in Espoo, Finland, at Leppävaara Stadium on 15 July.

== Records ==
Prior to the competition, the records were as follows:

European U23 record	Steve Backley (GBR)	89.58 m	Stockholm, Sweden	2 July 1990
Championship U23 record	Cyprian Mrzygłód (POL)	84.97 m	Gävle, Sweden	13 July 2019

== Results ==
Rank	Athlete	Nation	#1	#2	#3	#4	#5	#6	Result	Notes
1st place, gold medalist(s)	Artur Felfner	Ukraine	79.42	x	82.32	78.87	82.07	83.04	83.04	EU23L
2nd place, silver medalist(s)	Topias Laine	Finland	74.34	78.77	79.77	77.92	x	74.58	79.77	
3rd place, bronze medalist(s)	Michele Fina	Italy	71.53	76.19	x	64.91	77.23	76.64	77.23	PB
4	Janne Läspä	Finland	71.43	73.28	75.76	75.50	x	77.19	77.19	
5	Eryk Kołodziejczak	Poland	71.33	76.66	72.30	x	x	73.34	76.66	
6	Aleksi Yli-Mannila	Finland	74.86	75.59	x	73.45	75.51	x	75.59	
7	Anže Durjava	Slovenia	70.48	74.01	74.31	x	71.30	70.23	74.31	
8	Martin Florian	Czech Republic	73.61	74.13	72.24	x	x	71.95	74.13	
9	Jakob Rahm	Sweden	70.26	68.81	73.91				73.91	PB
10	Lenny Brisseault	France	72.27	72.86	71.95				72.86	
11	Daniel Thrana	Norway	72.16	70.93	x				72.16	
12	Pablo Costas	Spain	x	59.85	71.25				71.25	
13	Matīss Kaudze	Latvia	64.22	70.34	x				70.34	
