= Athletics at the 2025 Summer World University Games – Men's discus throw =

Men's discus throw at the 2025 Summer World University Games
- Venue: Lohrheidestadion
- Location: Bochum, Germany
- Dates: 21 July (qualification); 22 July (final)
- Competitors: 20 from 17 nations
- Winning distance: 64.26 m

Medalists
gold medal	Miká Sosna	Germany
silver medal	Steven Richter	Germany
bronze medal	Mykhailo Brudin	Ukraine

The men's discus throw event at the 2025 Summer World University Games was held in Bochum, Germany, at Lohrheidestadion on 21 and 22 July.

== Records ==
Prior to the competition, the records were as follows:

Record	Athlete (nation)	Distance (m)	Location	Date
Games record	Luis Delis (CUB)	68.46 m	Edmonton, Canada	8 July 1983

== Results ==
=== Qualification ===
All athletes over 59.50 m (Q) or at least the 12 best performers (q) advance to the final.

==== Group A ====
Place	Athlete	Nation	#1	#2	#3	Result	Notes
1	Miká Sosna	Germany	61.33			61.33 m	Q
2	Enrico Saccomano	Italy	54.35	60.26		60.26 m	Q
3	Mykhailo Brudin	Ukraine	58.25	58.85	57.27	58.85 m	q
4	Enes Çankaya	Turkey	55.30	57.39	55.58	57.39 m	q
5	Etienne Rousseau	Australia	50.04	56.70	50.03	56.70 m	q
6	Jakub Forejt	Czech Republic	55.25	56.35	56.65	56.65 m	q
7	Jacob Lemmon	United States	56.21	x	56.17	56.21 m	q
8	Abhimanyu	India	52.85	x	x	52.85 m	q
9	Teo Paganus	Sweden	45.86	48.99	48.70	48.99 m	
10	Mauricio Machry	Brazil	x	45.84	44.60	45.84 m	

==== Group B ====
Place	Athlete	Nation	#1	#2	#3	Result	Notes
1	Steven Richter	Germany	58.74	61.15		61.15 m	Q
2	Casey Helm	United States	56.23	x	56.10	56.23 m	q
3	Aron Alvarez Aranda	South Africa	42.59	55.41	54.33	55.41 m	q
4	Damian Rodziak	Poland	54.42	54.27	53.90	54.42 m	q
5	Gian Vetterli	Switzerland	52.71	x	52.20	52.71 m	
6	Zalán Strigencz	Hungary	52.38	51.88	47.91	52.38 m	
7	Rafail Zacharia	Cyprus	52.13	x	x	52.13 m	
8	Wesley Eze	Canada	x	47.54	x	47.54 m	
9	Alex Thankachan	India	47.14	46.52	46.24	47.14 m	
10	Nicholas Wedderman	Great Britain	44.49	x	x	44.49 m	

=== Final ===
Place	Athlete	Nation	#1	#2	#3	#4	#5	#6	Result	Notes
1st place, gold medalist(s)	Miká Sosna	Germany	63.65	64.22	x	x	64.26	63.69	64.26 m	
2nd place, silver medalist(s)	Steven Richter	Germany	61.34	61.75	x	61.77	x	x	61.77 m	
3rd place, bronze medalist(s)	Mykhailo Brudin	Ukraine	59.78	59.94	x	58.38	60.71	58.90	60.71 m	SB
4	Casey Helm	United States	58.99	58.14	x	x	x	x	58.99 m	
5	Enrico Saccomano	Italy	x	57.93	58.17	x	x	57.21	58.17 m	
6	Enes Çankaya	Turkey	56.51	55.64	57.54	56.01	54.46	54.24	57.54 m	
7	Damian Rodziak	Poland	52.42	56.10	55.08	54.59	x	x	56.10 m	
8	Jakub Forejt	Czech Republic	54.05	55.97	56.00	x	54.68	x	56.00 m	
9	Aron Alvarez Aranda	South Africa	x	55.08	55.94				55.94 m	
10	Etienne Rousseau	Australia	53.13	x	55.25				55.25 m	
11	Jacob Lemmon	United States	52.18	50.17	55.01				55.01 m	
—	Abhimanyu	India	x	x	x				NM	
