= 2021 European Athletics U23 Championships – Men's javelin throw =

Men's javelin throw at the 2021 European Athletics U23 Championships
- Venue: Kadriorg Stadium, Tallinn
- Dates: 9, 11 July
- Competitors: 22 from 16 nations
- Winning distance: 81.67

Medalists
gold medal	Topias Laine	Finland
silver medal	Leandro Ramos	Portugal
bronze medal	Teura’itera’i Tupaia	France

The men's javelin throw event at the 2021 European Athletics U23 Championships was held in Tallinn, Estonia, at Kadriorg Stadium on 9 and 11 July.

== Records ==
Prior to the competition, the records were as follows:

European U23 record	Steve Backley (GBR)	89.58	Stockholm, Sweden	2 July 1990
Championship U23 record	Cyprian Mrzygłód (POL)	84.97	Gävle, Sweden	13 July 2019

== Results ==
=== Qualification ===
Qualification rule: 77.00 (Q) or the 12 best results (q) qualified for the final.

Rank	Group	Name	Nationality	#1	#2	#3	Results	Notes
1	B	Topias Laine	Finland	80.67			80.67	Q
2	B	Pavel Sasimovich	Belarus	70.75	70.39	77.49	77.49	Q, SB
3	A	Dawid Wegner	Poland	76.79	71.01	73.87	76.79	q, =SB
4	B	Simon Wieland	Switzerland	69.23	76.44	–	76.44	q
5	A	Teemu Narvi	Finland	74.03	72.92	75.76	75.76	q
6	A	Leandro Ramos	Portugal	70.49	75.50	x	75.50	q
7	B	Teura’itera’i Tupaia	France	74.19	74.77	–	74.77	q
8	B	Dimitris Tsitsos	Greece	74.02	–	–	74.02	q
9	A	Máté Járvás	Hungary	65.85	73.48	x	73.48	q
10	B	Oskar Trejgo	Poland	72.18	72.32	x	72.32	q
11	B	Aleksi Yli-Mannila	Finland	63.95	64.40	71.81	71.81	q
12	B	Martin Florian	Czech Republic	68.08	67.22	71.60	71.60	q
13	A	Arthur Petersen	Denmark	66.91	71.30	63.37	71.30	
14	A	Jhonatam Maullu	Italy	68.61	68.91	70.59	70.59	
15	A	Patrik Michalec	Slovakia	70.42	63.42	67.18	70.42	
16	B	Noel Kovács	Hungary	68.78	67.10	69.49	69.49	SB
17	A	Maurice Voigt	Germany	69.16	58.68	x	69.16	
18	B	Myron Weinberg	Norway	62.99	68.57	x	68.57	
19	B	Spyros Savva	Cyprus	68.53	67.08	66.79	68.53	
20	A	Franck Di Sanza	Switzerland	x	67.13	66.53	67.13	
21	A	Kunnar Erich Viisel	Estonia	65.01	64.25	65.80	65.80	
22	A	Yauheni Lipsky	Belarus	63.77	64.83	57.95	64.83	

=== Final ===
Rank	Name	Nationality	#1	#2	#3	#4	#5	#6	Result	Notes
1st place, gold medalist(s)	Topias Laine	Finland	74.99	74.73	81.67	x	76.26	71.54	81.67	EU23L
2nd place, silver medalist(s)	Leandro Ramos	Portugal	73.88	x	78.95	80.61	75.48	73.90	80.61	
3rd place, bronze medalist(s)	Teura’itera’i Tupaia	France	76.52	71.90	72.77	72.26	78.80	75.19	78.80	
4	Dimitris Tsitsos	Greece	72.51	x	76.27	76.16	78.22	76.94	78.22	PB
5	Dawid Wegner	Poland	76.02	77.17	x	74.69	75.54	73.22	77.17	SB
6	Teemu Narvi	Finland	70.85	75.27	x	x	73.55	75.09	75.27	
7	Simon Wieland	Switzerland	–	74.75	73.26	–	74.62	68.86	74.75	
8	Máté Járvás	Hungary	x	72.30	68.80	70.71	69.89	x	72.30	
9	Martin Florian	Czech Republic	67.64	63.41	66.71				67.64	
10	Oskar Trejgo	Poland	65.84	65.78	67.53				67.53	
11	Pavel Sasimovich	Belarus	67.16	66.95	x				67.16	
12	Aleksi Yli-Mannila	Finland	66.59	x	66.84				66.84	
