= 2022 World Athletics U20 Championships – Men's discus throw =

Men's discus throw at the 2022 World Athletics U20 Championships
- Venue: Estadio Olímpico Pascual Guerrero
- Dates: 5 August (qualification); 6 August (final)
- Competitors: 23 from 17 nations
- Winning distance: 65.55 m

Medalists
gold medal	Marius Karges	Germany
silver medal	Miká Sosna	Germany
bronze medal	Mykhailo Brudin	Ukraine

The men's discus throw at the 2022 World Athletics U20 Championships was held at Estadio Olímpico Pascual Guerrero on 5 and 6 August.

== Records ==
Standing records prior to the 2022 World Athletics U20 Championships
World U20 Record	Miká Sosna (GER)	71.37	Schönebeck, Germany	10 June 2022
Championship Record	Mykolas Alekna (LTU)	69.81	Nairobi, Kenya	22 August 2021
World U20 Leading	Miká Sosna (GER)	71.37	Schönebeck, Germany	10 June 2022

== Results ==
=== Qualification ===
The qualification round took place on 5 August, in two groups, bwith Group A starting at 9:25 and Group B starting at 10:25. Athletes attaining a mark of at least 60.50 metres ( Q ) or at least the 12 best performers ( q ) qualified for the final.

Rank	Group	Name	Nationality	Round			Mark	Notes
Rank	Group	Name	Nationality	1	2	3	Mark	Notes
1	A	Mykhailo Brudin	Ukraine	59.63	59.24	61.47	61.47	Q, PB
2	B	Miká Sosna	Germany	61.00			61.00	Q
3	B	Dimitrios Pavlidis	Greece	60.73			60.73	Q, PB
4	A	Marius Karges	Germany	60.69			60.69	Q
5	B	Kevin Grubbs	United States	53.38	60.29	58.15	60.29	q, PB
6	A	Desmond Coleman	United States	59.79	x	x	59.79	q
7	A	Marcos Moreno	Spain	59.07	59.63	58.54	59.63	q
8	A	Sebastiaan Bonte	Netherlands	58.44	56.34	x	58.44	q
9	A	Darcy Miller	Australia	57.77	57.57	57.72	57.77	q
10	B	Kobe Lawrence	Jamaica	57.18	56.56	x	57.18	q
11	B	Aron Alvarez Aranda	Rwanda	54.58	56.88	49.83	56.88	q
12	A	Christopher Young	Jamaica	55.01	x	56.74	56.74	q
13	B	Steffen Melheim	Norway	56.58	56.06	55.79	56.58	
14	B	Damian Rodziak	Poland	48.09	53.39	55.54	55.54	
15	A	Iosif Michalis Papa	Cyprus	54.63	55.07	53.69	55.07	
16	A	Danie Strooh	South Africa	54.65	x	x	54.65	
17	B	Dunyozod Savfullayev	Uzbekistan	49.31	53.88	x	53.88	
18	B	Djibrine Adoum Ahmat	Qatar	48.13	51.71	53.80	53.80	
19	A	Konstantinos Bouzakis	Greece	x	53.79	x	53.79	
20	B	Etienne Rousseau	Australia	52.19	51.79	53.19	53.19	
21	A	Hollman Villamizar	Colombia	51.14	x	x	51.14	
22	B	Andreas De Lathauwer	Belgium	47.25	51.01	x	51.01	
	A	Jakub Korejba	Poland	x	x	x	NM	

=== Final ===
The final was held on 6 August at 15:29.

Rank	Name	Nationality	Round						Mark	Notes
Rank	Name	Nationality	1	2	3	4	5	6	Mark	Notes
1st place, gold medalist(s)	Marius Karges	Germany	61.03	60.88	62.84	63.91	62.07	65.55	65.55	
2nd place, silver medalist(s)	Miká Sosna	Germany	63.88	x	x	x	x	x	63.88	
3rd place, bronze medalist(s)	Mykhailo Brudin	Ukraine	59.52	60.91	59.20	63.30	51.16	60.26	63.30	PB
4	Dimitrios Pavlidis	Greece	57.66	59.68	60.12	60.04	61.48	61.77	61.77	NU20R
5	Sebastiaan Bonte	Netherlands	59.29	x	61.22	60.27	53.48	58.63	61.22	PB
6	Marcos Moreno	Spain	53.57	60.94	57.73	59.99	58.22	x	60.94	
7	Desmond Coleman	United States	59.44	x	60.43	x	x	x	60.43	PB
8	Christopher Young	Jamaica	58.77	57.95	60.31	59.84	59.64	58.69	60.31	
9	Kevin Grubbs	United States	60.11	59.59	x				60.11	
10	Kobe Lawrence	Jamaica	57.54	59.96	x				59.96	
11	Aron Alvarez Aranda	Rwanda	57.42	x	59.36				59.36	
12	Darcy Miller	Australia	x	57.19	58.46				58.46	
