= Eemil Porvari =

Finnish javelin thrower (born 2003)

Personal information
- Born: 2 February 2003 (age 23)

Sport
- Sport: Athletics
- Event: Javelin throw

Achievements and titles
- Personal best: Javelin: 82.69 (2024)
Medal record
Men's athletics
Representing Finland
European U23 Championships
| Bronze medal – third place | 2025 Bergen | Javelin throw |

Eemil Porvari (born 2 February 2003) is a Finnish javelin thrower.

== Biography ==
In 2024, he threw a personal best of 82.69 metres, as he improved his best mark during the year by over eight and a half metres, and made 13 throws over 80 metres in total throughout the season.

He threw 81.55 metres to place fourth at the 2025 European Throwing Cup in Nicosia, Cyprus. He won the bronze medal in the javelin throw at the 2025 European Athletics U23 Championships in Bergen, Norway with a fourth round throw of 79.88m in the final in July 2025. He had previously been the top qualifier with a throw of 80.26 metres in the preliminary round.

He was runner-up at the Finnkampen tournament in Stockholm in August 2025. He was selected for the Finnish team to compete at the 2025 World Athletics Championships in Tokyo, Japan, throwing 78.51 metres without advancing to the final.

In August 2026, he competed at the 2026 European Athletics Championships in Birmingham, England, in the javelin throw.
