= Steven Richter =

German athlete (born 2003)

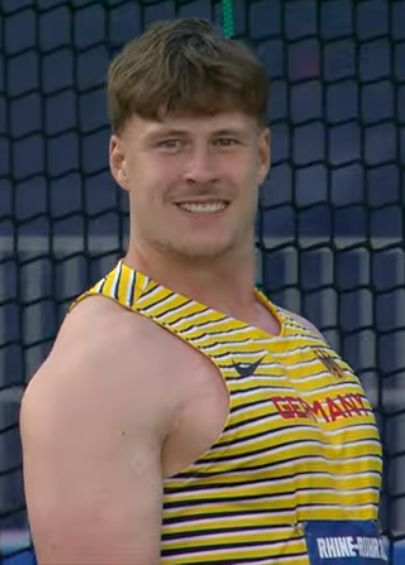
- At the 2025 Summer World University Games

Personal information
- Nationality: German
- Born: 5 April 2003 (age 23)

Sport
- Sport: Athletics
- Event: Discus throw

Achievements and titles
- Personal bests: Discus: 74.00m (Ramona, 2026)
Medal record
Men's athletics
Representing Germany
European Throwing Cup
| Gold medal – first place | 2026 Nicosia | Discus |
| Gold medal – first place | 2025 Nicosia | U23 Discus |
| Gold medal – first place | 2024 Leiria | U23 Disuxs |
| Gold medal – first place | 2023 Leiria | U23 Discus |
European U23 Championships
| Gold medal – first place | 2025 Bergen | Discus |
Summer World University Games
| Silver medal – second place | 2025 Bochum | Discus |

Steven Richter (born 5 April 2003) is a German discus thrower. The 2026 European Throwing Cup and 2025 European under-23 champion, he competed at the 2023 and 2025 World Athletics Championships and was a silver medalist at the 2025 University Games.

== Biography ==
From Gelenau, he is a member of LV 90 Erzgebirge. He won the men's U23 event at the 2023 European Throwing Cup in Leiria, Portugal with a personal best throw of 64.23m.

He retained his men's U23 title at the 2024 European Throwing Cup in Leiria, improving throughout the competition with his final throw being 61.00 metres. He competed for Germany at the 2023 World Athletics Championships in Budapest, but did not reach the final of the men's discus throw.

He won the men's U23 event at the 2025 European Throwing Cup in Nicosia, Cyprus, winning the competition initially with a 60.46m before improving with a 60.72m throw with the competition's final throw. He threw a personal best 69.61m in Ramona, Oklahoma in April 2025.

He won the gold medal at the 2025 European Athletics U23 Championships in Bergen, leading a German 1-2-3 in the event, ahead of compatriots Mika Sosna and Marius Karges. He won the silver medal behind Sosna at the 2025 Summer World University Games in Bochum.

In September 2025, he competed in the discus throw at the 2025 World Championships in Tokyo, Japan, without advancing to the final. After placing small bets on athletics totalling €40, he received a three-month suspended ban from the Athletics Integrity Unit (AIU), backdated to September 2025, with a "lack of education on betting" rules considered as "one of several mitigating factors in arriving at the sanctions" alongside early admission, genuine remorse, and having previously possessed a clean disciplinary record. His Germany teammate Henrik Janssen received an identical suspended ban.

In February 2026, he won the men’s discus with 64.25m at the German Outdoor Throwing Championships, finishing ahead of Kagnes. He won the discus title at the 2026 European Throwing Cup in Nicosia, Cyprus, with a throw of 67.29 metres. On 9 April, he threw 74.00 metres and 73.96 m in Ramona, Oklahoma as part of a sequence of five throws over 70 metres to move to fourth on the world all-time list. In August, he competed at the 2026 European Athletics Championships in Birmingham, England, in the discus throw.

== Personal life ==
He is a student at Chemnitz University of Technology.
