= Marius Karges =

German athlete

Personal information
- Nationality: German
- Born: 14 January 2003 (age 23)

Sport
- Sport: Athletics
- Event: Discus throw

Achievements and titles
- Personal bests: Discus: 63.74 (Halle, 2023)
Medal record
Men's athletics
Representing Germany
World U20 Championships
Gold medal – first place	2022 Cali	Discus
European U23 Championships
Silver medal – second place	2023 Espoo	Discus
Bronze medal – third place	2025 Bergen	Discus

Marius Karges (born 14 January 2003) is a German discus thrower. In 2022, he became World under-20 Champion in the discus throw.

== Early life ==
Karges was born in Bad Wildungen, in the Waldeck-Frankenberg district of Hesse, Germany. He attended the Carl von Weinberg School in Frankfurt and is a member of Eintracht Frankfurt athletics club.

== Career ==
In August 2022, he was a gold medalist at the 2022 World Athletics U20 Championships in Cali, Colombia, finishing ahead of compatriot Miká Sosna, winning gold with a throw of 65.55 metres.

He came third at the German Winter Throwing Championships in 2023, with a personal best throw with the 2 kilogram men’s discus of 62.43 meters. Shortly afterwards, he was selected for his senior international debut, representing Germany at the European Throwing Cup in Portugal. He finished seventh in Portugal with a throw of 60.94 metres.

In May 2023, he threw a new personal best of 63.74 metres in Halle. In July 2023, he was a silver medalist at the European Athletics U23 Championships in Espoo, Finland, finishing behind Lithuanian Mykolas Alekna.

He threw a personal best 64.11 metres for the two-kilogram men's discus whilst competing in Neubrandenburg in May 2024 during a run of consistency that saw him not drop below 60 metres in a competition for the first part of the year, although ultimately he fell short of the European Championships standard of 65.20 metres. He finished runner-up at the German U23 Championships in Monchengladbach in July 2024 with a throw of 63.51 metres.

He won the bronze medal at the 2025 European Athletics U23 Championships in Bergen, part of a German 1-2-3 in the event, behind compatriots Mika Sosna and event winner Steven Richter.

In February 2026, he threw 60.43 metres to finish runner-up to Steven Richter at the German Throwing Championships. In August, he competed at the 2026 European Athletics Championships in Birmingham, England, in the discus throw.
