= 2026 European Athletics Championships – Men's javelin throw =

Men's javelin throw at the 2026 European Athletics Championships
- Venue: Alexander Stadium
- Location: Birmingham, United Kingdom
- Dates: 13 August 2026 (qualification); 15 August 2026 (final)
- Winning distance: 90.40 m CR

Medalists
gold medal	Julian Weber	Germany
silver medal	Nick Thumm	Germany
bronze medal	Patriks Gailums	Latvia

The men's javelin throw at the 2026 European Athletics Championships took place in Birmingham, United Kingdom, on 13 and 15 August 2026.

== Background ==
Records before the 2026 European Athletics Championships
Record	Athlete (nation)	Distance	Location	Date
World record	Jan Železný (CZE)	98.48 m	Jena, Germany	25 May 1996
World leading	Rumesh Tharanga Pathirage (SRI)	92.62 m	Rome, Italy	4 June 2026
Championship record	Steve Backley (GBR)	89.72 m	Budapest, Hungary	23 August 1998
European record	Jan Železný (CZE)	98.48 m	Jena, Germany	25 May 1996
European leading	Julian Weber (GER)	87.04 m	Lucerne, Switzerland	16 July 2026

== Qualification ==
The qualification period was from 27 July 2025 to 26 July 2026. Athletes qualified by running the entry standard of 83.00 m or longer, or by their position on the World Athletics Rankings for the event. The target number was 30 athletes.

Qualification standings per 31 July 2026
QP	CP	Country	Athlete	Status	Details
1	1	Germany	Julian Weber	Qualified by Entry Standard	91.51 - Letzigrund, Zürich (SUI) - 28 AUG 2025
2	1	Poland	Dawid Wegner	Qualified by Entry Standard	85.67 - National Stadium, Tokyo (JPN) - 17 SEP 2025
3	1	Czech Republic	Jakub Vadlejch	Qualified by Entry Standard	85.24 - National Stadium, Tokyo (JPN) - 17 MAY 2026
4	1	Finland	Oliver Helander	Qualified by Entry Standard	83.97 - Boudewijnstadion, Bruxelles (BEL) - 22 AUG 2025
5	2	Poland	Marcin Krukowski	Qualified by Entry Standard	83.73 - Stadion Zygmunta Szelesta, Warszawa (POL) - 23 MAY 2026
6	1	Lithuania	Edis Matusevičius	Qualified by Entry Standard	83.65 - Palangos Stadionas, Palanga (LTU) - 17 JUN 2026
7	1	Ukraine	Artur Felfner	Qualified by Entry Standard	83.62 - Suhaim bin Hamad Stadium, Doha (QAT) - 19 JUN 2026
8	1	Slovakia	Jakub Kubínec	Qualified by Entry Standard	83.49 - Atletický štadión, Martin (SVK) - 23 MAY 2026
9	2	Germany	Thomas Röhler	Qualified by Entry Standard	83.33 - Nyayo National Stadium, Nairobi (KEN) - 24 APR 2026
10	1	Latvia	Patriks Gailums	Qualified by Entry Standard	83.09 - Palangos Stadionas, Palanga (LTU) - 17 JUN 2026
11	1	Moldova	Andrian Mardare	Qualified by World Rankings	7th - 1194 points
12	1	Switzerland	Simon Wieland	Qualified by World Rankings	10th - 1160 points
13	1	Iceland	Sindri Hrafn Guðmundsson	Qualified by World Rankings	14th - 1154 points
14	1	Greece	Dimitrios Tsitsos	Qualified by World Rankings	16th - 1143 points
15	1	Great Britain & N.I.	Ben East	Qualified by World Rankings	18th - 1140 points
16	1	France	Felise Vahai Sosaia	Qualified by World Rankings	19th - 1138 points
17	3	Germany	Nick Thumm	Qualified by World Rankings	21st - 1136 points
18	2	Finland	Eemil Porvari	Qualified by World Rankings	22nd - 1129 points
19	2	Czech Republic	Martin Konečný	Qualified by World Rankings	23rd - 1128 points
20	1	Spain	Manu Quijera	Qualified by World Rankings	25th - 1125 points
21	3	Finland	Topi Parviainen	Qualified by World Rankings	26th - 1120 points
22	3	Czech Republic	Jan Výška	Qualified by World Rankings	27th - 1118 points
reserve	4	Finland	Topias Laine	Qualified by World Rankings	29th - 1112 points
23	1	Italy	Giovanni Frattini	Qualified by World Rankings	31st - 1110 points
24	1	Netherlands	Ryan Jansen	Qualified by World Rankings	33rd - 1106 points
25	2	Switzerland	Franck Di Sanza	Qualified by World Rankings	35th - 1103 points
26	1	Belgium	Timothy Herman	Qualified by World Rankings	36th - 1101 points
27	1	Denmark	Arthur W. Petersen	Qualified by World Rankings	37th - 1094 points
28	2	Latvia	Krišjānis Suntažs	Qualified by World Rankings	38th - 1092 points
29	2	Slovakia	Patrik Michalec	Qualified by World Rankings	42nd - 1087 points
30	2	Italy	Michele Fina	Qualified by World Rankings	43rd - 1083 points
reserve	1	Sweden	Kim Amb	Next best by World Rankings	44th - 1083 points
reserve	1	Norway	Daniel Thrana	Next best by World Rankings	45th - 1082 points
reserve	5	Finland	Taneli Juutinen	Next best by World Rankings	47th - 1075 points
reserve	6	Finland	Teemu Narvi	Next best by World Rankings	48th - 1073 points
reserve	1	Hungary	György Herczeg	Next best by World Rankings	51st - 1065 points
reserve	1	Slovenia	Filip Dominković	Next best by World Rankings	52nd - 1062 points
reserve	3	Latvia	Gatis Čakšs	Next best by World Rankings	55th - 1058 points
reserve	3	Italy	Roberto Orlando	Next best by World Rankings	59th - 1047 points
reserve	7	Finland	Aku Parviainen	Next best by World Rankings	66th - 1035 points
reserve	4	Italy	Simone Comini	Next best by World Rankings	71st - 1027 points

== Schedule ==
Date	Time	Round
13 August 2026	13:48	Qualification
15 August 2026	20:01	Final

All times are local times (UTC+1)

== Results ==
=== Qualification ===
The qualification round was held on 13 August 2026, at 13:47 in the afternoon. All athletes meeting the Qualification Standard (Q) of 82.00 m or at least 12 best performers (q) advanced to the final.

==== Group A ====
Place	Athlete	Nation	Round			Result	Notes
Place	Athlete	Nation	#1	#2	#3	Result	Notes
1	Julian Weber	Germany	84.02			84.02 m	Q
2	Nick Thumm	Germany	81.84	81.52	83.49	83.49 m	Q, PB
3	Dawid Wegner	Poland	79.03	79.34	82.40	82.40 m	Q, SB
4	Dimitrios Tsitsos	Greece	75.59	71.02	80.95	80.95 m	q, PB
5	Edis Matusevičius	Lithuania	77.26	75.46	80.89	80.89 m	q
6	Patriks Gailums	Latvia	74.12	x	79.61	79.61 m	q
7	Arthur Wiborg Petersen	Denmark	79.30	x	70.05	79.30 m	q, SB
8	Sindri Hrafn Guðmundsson	Iceland	77.49	x	79.21	79.21 m	q
9	Oliver Helander	Finland	x	78.43	x	78.43 m	
10	Michele Fina	Italy	72.84	77.56	x	77.56 m	
11	Manu Quijera	Spain	77.40	76.49	76.76	77.40 m	
12	Jan Výška	Czech Republic	76.83	73.14	72.01	76.83 m	
13	Artur Felfner	Ukraine	x	75.91	76.37	76.37 m	
14	Simon Wieland	Switzerland	68.70	65.25	76.05	76.05 m	
15	Patrik Michalec	Slovakia	72.06	72.82	72.38	72.82 m	

==== Group B ====
Place	Athlete	Nation	Round			Result	Notes
Place	Athlete	Nation	#1	#2	#3	Result	Notes
1	Jakub Vadlejch	Czech Republic	80.92	-	-	80.92 m	q
2	Giovanni Frattini	Italy	77.11	78.43	80.54	80.54 m	q, SB
3	Marcin Krukowski	Poland	76.51	79.71	-	79.71 m	q
4	Topi Parviainen	Finland	74.57	78.88	x	78.88 m	q
5	Ben East	Great Britain & N.I.	75.52	75.01	78.77	78.77 m	
6	Thomas Röhler	Germany	78.67	x	x	78.67 m	
7	Jakub Kubínec	Slovakia	77.63	x	74.24	77.63 m	
8	Martin Konečný	Czech Republic	76.84	70.77	x	76.84 m	
9	Ryan Jansen	Netherlands	76.81	x	74.57	76.81 m	
10	Timothy Herman	Belgium	75.65	71.64	x	75.65 m	
11	Eemil Porvari	Finland	75.09	74.15	75.15	75.15 m	
12	Andrian Mardare	Moldova	74.41	x	x	74.41 m	
13	Franck di Sanza	Switzerland	x	72.61	71.74	72.61 m	
14	Felise Vaha'i Sosaia	France	x	64.94	66.11	70.95 m	

=== Final ===
The final was held on 15 August 2026, at 20:01 in the evening.

Place	Athlete	Nation	Round						Result	Notes
Place	Athlete	Nation	#1	#2	#3	#4	#5	#6	Result	Notes
1st place, gold medalist(s)	Julian Weber	Germany	83.71	80.24	79.43	77.61	79.62	90.40	90.40 m	CR, EL
2nd place, silver medalist(s)	Nick Thumm	Germany	81.10	78.20	80.80	82.59	83.76	x	83.76 m	PB
3rd place, bronze medalist(s)	Patriks Gailums	Latvia	70.93	78.59	82.97	78.30	77.73	80.33	82.97 m	
4	Dawid Wegner	Poland	78.62	82.96	x	82.44	78.80	81.19	82.96 m	SB
5	Jakub Vadlejch	Czech Republic	79.12	82.58	79.38	79.19	x	82.88	82.88 m	
6	Edis Matusevičius	Lithuania	78.87	80.60	78.60	81.07	79.53	80.02	81.07 m	
7	Marcin Krukowski	Poland	79.69	x	x	x	x	x	79.69 m	
8	Topi Parviainen	Finland	71.93	77.82	x	x	x	76.86	77.82 m	
9	Giovanni Frattini	Italy	x	71.25	76.56	-	-	-	76.56 m	
10	Sindri Hrafn Guðmundsson	Iceland	71.94	72.79	75.36	-	-	-	75.36 m	
11	Arthur Wiborg Petersen	Denmark	67.44	68.21	71.63	-	-	-	71.63 m	
12	Dimitrios Tsitsos	Greece	71.45	x	x	-	-	-	71.45 m	
