= Jade Maraval =

French athlete (born 2002)

Personal information
- Born: 6 June 2002 (age 24) Montbéliard, France
- Height: 174 cm (5 ft 9 in)
- Weight: 75 kg (165 lb)

Sport
- Country: France
- Sport: Athletics
- Event: Javelin throw
- Club: Montbéliard Belfort Athlétisme
- Coached by: Sylvain Brachotte

Achievements and titles
- Personal bests: Javelin: 60.02m (Nicosia, 2026)
Medal record
Women's athletics
Representing France
European Throwing Cup
Gold medal – first place	2026 Nicosia	Javelin throw
Gold medal – first place	2024 Leiria	U23 Javelin

Jade Maraval (born 6 June 2002) is a French javelin thrower. She won the European Throwing Cup in 2026.

== Biography ==
Born in Territoire de Belfort, Maraval competes as a member of Montbéliard Belfort Athlétisme. Maraval placed third overall in the javelin throw at the senior 2023 French Athletics Championships in Albin July 2023. Maraval won her eighth age-group French national title in February 2024 in Provence. Maraval won the U23 competition at the 2024 European Throwing Cup with a best throw of 55.07 metres.

In March 2025, she won the senior French Winter Throwing Championships for the first time at the age of 22 year-old, having previously won multiple national titles at junior age-group and under-23 categories, setting a new personal best of 58.97 metres. She placed fifth overall at the 2025 European Throwing Cup, throwing over 55 metres three times, with a best of 56.74 metres. She was runner-up in the javelin throw at the 2025 French Athletics Championships in Talence, with a throw of 55.17 metres to finish behind Alizée Minard.

She won the senior title at the 2026 European Throwing Cup in Nicosia, Cyprus, throwing over 60 metres for the first time to set a new personal best of 60.02 metres. She threw 59.97 metres to place sixth on 28 June at the 2026 Meeting de Paris. With a throw of 58.79 metres she placed second overall at the 2026 French Championships.
