= 2025 European Athletics U23 Championships – Men's javelin throw =

Men's javelin throw at the 2025 European Athletics U23 Championships
- Venue: Fana Stadion
- Location: Bergen, Norway
- Dates: 17 July (qualification); 19 July (final)
- Competitors: 20 from 14 nations
- Winning distance: 81.14 m

Medalists
gold medal	Artur Felfner	Ukraine
silver medal	Nick Thumm	Germany
bronze medal	Eemil Porvari	Finland

The men's javelin throw event at the 2025 European Athletics U23 Championships was held in Bergen, Norway, at Fana Stadion on 17 and 19 July.

== Records ==
Prior to the competition, the records were as follows:

Record	Athlete (nation)	Distance (m)	Location	Date
European U23 record	Max Dehning (GER)	90.20 m	Halle, Germany	25 February 2024
Championship U23 record	Cyprian Mrzygłód (POL)	84.97 m	Gävle, Sweden	13 July 2019

== Results ==
=== Qualification ===
All athletes over 76.00 m (Q) or at least the 12 best performers (q) advance to the final.

==== Group A ====
Place	Athlete	Nation	#1	#2	#3	Result	Notes
1	Eemil Porvari	Finland	75.43	80.26		80.26 m	Q
2	Max Dehning	Germany	78.20			78.20 m	Q
3	Jan Výška	Czech Republic	73.98	69.63	75.88	75.88 m	q
4	Muhammet Hanifi Zengin	Turkey	69.73	70.10	70.68	70.68 m	q
5	Máté Horváth	Hungary	70.58	69.95	x	70.58 m	q
6	Matthias Verling	Liechtenstein	69.57	61.24	x	69.57 m	
7	Aku Parviainen	Finland	67.20	69.27		69.27 m	
8	Kristian Lazzaretto	Italy	68.83	62.14	x	68.83 m	
9	Krešimir Galić	Croatia	66.71	68.81	x	68.81 m	
10	Gabriel Koletsi	Greece	62.73	55.93	66.87	66.87 m	

==== Group B ====
Place	Athlete	Nation	#1	#2	#3	Result	Notes
1	Nick Thumm	Germany	76.98			76.98 m	Q
2	Ryan Jansen	Netherlands	74.95	68.94	-	74.95 m	q
3	Alexandr Čača	Czech Republic	65.64	74.22	74.08	74.22 m	q
4	Artur Felfner	Ukraine	68.79	73.75	72.06	73.75 m	q
5	Tuomas Närhi	Finland	71.89	-	-	71.89 m	q
6	Lucio Claudio Visca	Italy	70.93	69.94	71.67	71.67 m	q
7	João Fernandes	Portugal	69.00	69.93	68.51	69.93 m	q
8	György Herczeg	Hungary	69.52	68.88	x	69.52 m	
9	Tristan Aik Sild	Estonia	62.02	59.72	68.03	68.03 m	
10	Kasparas Bačianskas	Lithuania	57.90	59.52	60.85	60.85 m	

=== Final ===
Place	Athlete	Nation	#1	#2	#3	#4	#5	#6	Result	Notes
1st place, gold medalist(s)	Artur Felfner	Ukraine	71.00	78.12	77.64	x	75.45	81.14	81.14 m	SB
2nd place, silver medalist(s)	Nick Thumm	Germany	79.40	80.16	78.04	77.55	-	80.74	80.74 m	PB
3rd place, bronze medalist(s)	Eemil Porvari	Finland	71.82	79.10	77.96	79.88	79.31	x	79.88 m	
4	Jan Výška	Czech Republic	68.36	77.60	76.11	74.53	73.04	74.48	77.60 m	PB
5	Máté Horváth	Hungary	72.36	x	72.62	71.58	71.47	75.17	75.17 m	PB
6	Max Dehning	Germany	74.85	x	x	72.41	x	x	74.85 m	
7	Muhammet Hanifi Zengin	Turkey	72.12	71.06	x	r			72.12 m	
8	Tuomas Närhi	Finland	65.85	70.19	71.87	71.87	68.66	x	71.87 m	
9	Alexandr Čača	Czech Republic	71.10	71.66	71.24				71.66 m	
10	Ryan Jansen	Netherlands	71.31	69.67	66.62				71.31 m	
11	Lucio Claudio Visca	Italy	70.46	x	68.62				70.46 m	
12	João Fernandes	Portugal	69.44	68.13	68.87				69.44 m	
