= Dawid Wegner =

Poland athlete (born 2000)

Personal information
- Nationality: Polish
- Born: 23 April 2000 (age 26)

Sport
- Sport: Athletics
- Event: Javelin

Achievements and titles
- Personal bests: Javelin: 87.47 m (Brussels, 2026)
Medal record
Men's athletics
Representing Poland
Diamond League
Second place	2026 Brussels	Javelin throw

Dawid Wegner (born 23 April 2000) is a Polish track and field athlete who competes in the javelin. He competed at the 2024 Olympic Games and the 2023 and 2025 World Championships. He placed second at the 2026 Diamond League Final.

== Early life ==
From Nakło nad Notecią in the Kuyavian–Pomeranian Voivodeship.

== Career ==
He won the Polish U20 championships in the javelin and competed as a junior athlete at the 2017 IAAF World U18 Championships in Nairobi and the 2019 European Athletics U20 Championships in Borås. In 2021, he qualified for the 2021 European Athletics U23 Championships in Tallinn, Estonia, where he finished fifth overall.

In May 2023, Wegner improved his personal best to 80.10m in Kielce. In June 2023, he threw a new personal best distance of 82.21 metres, in Gdańsk. In July 2023, he finished as runner-up in the Polish national championships. He was selected for the 2023 World Athletics Championships in Budapest in August 2023, and threw 81.25 metres in the qualifying round to qualify for the final with the fourth best throw. In the final, he recorded a best throw of 80.75 metres to place ninth overall.

He was selected for the 2024 European Athletics Championships in Rome in June 2024 where he threw 79.35 metres to place thirteenth in qualifying and did not progress as one of the top twelfth to the final, missing out by one place and under a metre from German thrower Max Dehning. He competed in the javelin at the 2024 Summer Olympics in Paris in August 2024, placing twenty sixth overall in the qualifying round with a throw of 76.89 metres, and did not proceed to the final.

Wegner threw a personal best 85.67 metres to qualify for the final at the 2025 World Athletics Championships in Tokyo, Japan, before throwing 83.03 metres to place ninth overall in the final.

On 15 August 2026, Wegner placed fourth at the 2026 European Athletics Championships in Birmingham, England, finishing a centimetre behind Patriks Gailums of Latvia with a season's best throw of 82.96m. At the 2026 Diamond League Final in Brussels on 5 September, Wegner threw a personal best of 87.47 metres to place second behind Rumesh Tharanga.

== International competitions ==
Year	Competition	Venue	Position	Event	Notes
Representing Poland
2017	World U18 Championships	Nairobi, Kenya	4th	Javelin throw (700g)	70.56 m
2019	European U20 Championships	Borås, Sweden	13th (q)	Javelin throw	70.43 m
2021	European U23 Championships	Tallinn, Estonia	5th	Javelin throw	77.17 m
2023	World Championships	Budapest, Hungary	9th	Javelin throw	80.75 m
2024	European Championships	Rome, Italy	13th (q)	Javelin throw	79.35 m
2024	Olympic Games	Paris, France	26th (q)	Javelin throw	76.89 m
2025	World Championships	Tokyo, Japan	9th	Javelin throw	83.03 m
2026	European Championships	Birmingham, United Kingdom	4th	Javelin throw	82.96 m
2026	World Ultimate Championship	Budapest, Hungary	7th	Javelin throw	77.21 m
