= Leandro Ramos =

Portuguese javelin thrower (born 2000)

Personal information
- Full name: Leandro Parreças Ramos
- Born: 21 September 2000 (age 26) Oliveira do Bairro, Portugal

Sport
- Sport: Athletics
- Event: Javelin throw
- Club: Gira Sol (2013–2017); Benfica (2018–)
- Coached by: Carlos Tribuna

Leandro Parreças Ramos (born 21 September 2000) is a Portuguese athlete specialising in the javelin throw. He won a silver medal at the 2021 European U23 Championships.

His personal best in the event is 84.78 metres set in Doha in 2022. This is the current national record.

== International competitions ==
Year	Competition	Venue	Position	Event	Notes
Representing Portugal
2018	World U20 Championships	Tampere, Finland	18th (q)	Javelin throw	67.78 m
2019	European U20 Championships	Borås, Sweden	9th	Javelin throw	70.64 m
2021	European U23 Championships	Tallinn, Estonia	2nd	Javelin throw	80.61 m
2022	European Throwing Cup (U23)	Leiria, Portugal	2nd	Javelin throw	76.48 m
2022	Ibero-American Championships	La Nucía, Spain	1st	Javelin throw	81.37 m
2022	Mediterranean Games	Oran, Algeria	1st	Javelin throw	82.23 m
2022	World Championships	Eugene, United States	22nd (q)	Javelin throw	77.34 m
2022	European Championships	Munich, Germany	20th (q)	Javelin throw	72.90 m
2023	World Championships	Budapest, Hungary	31st (q)	Javelin throw	74.03 m
2024	Ibero-American Championships	Cuiabá, Brazil	2nd	Javelin throw	83.09 m
2024	European Championships	Rome, Italy	15th (q)	Javelin throw	79.17 m
2024	Olympic Games	Paris, France	28th (q)	Javelin throw	75.73 m
2025	World Championships	Tokyo, Japan	32nd (q)	Javelin throw	76.65 m
2026	Ibero-American Championships	Lima, Peru	2nd	Javelin throw	79.58 m
2026	Mediterranean Games	Taranto, Italy	4th	Javelin throw	76.38 m
