= Miká Sosna =

German athlete (born 2003)

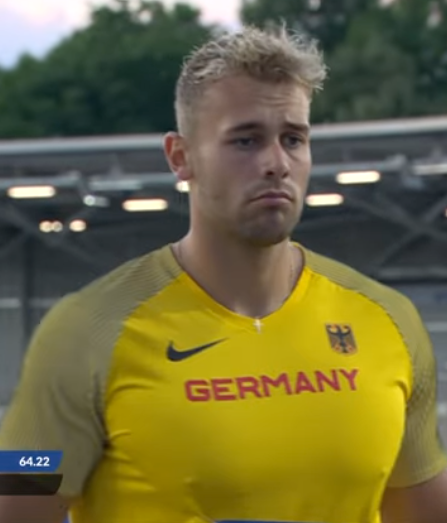
- At the 2025 Summer World University Games

Personal information
- Nationality: German
- Born: 13 June 2003 (age 23)

Sport
- Sport: Athletics
- Event: Discus throw

Achievements and titles
- Personal bests: Discus: 68.96 (Ramona, 2024)
Medal record
Men's athletics
Representing Germany
European U23 Championships
Silver medal – second place	2025 Bergen	Discus
Summer World University Games
Gold medal – first place	2025 Bochum	Discus
World U20 Championships
Silver medal – second place	2022 Cali	Discus

Miká Sosna (born 13 June 2003) is a German track and field athlete. In 2022, he set a world under-20 record in the discus throw. He competed at the 2024 Olympic Games.

== Career ==
He is a member of TSG Bergedorf where he is coached by Juri Minor, a former Soviet decathlon champion. Competing as a 17 year-old in Neubrandenburg in 2020, he threw a 1.5 kg discus 64.05m to set a world record in his age group.

In June 2022, he set a Men’s world U20 discus (1.75 kg) record of 71.37m in Schönebeck. He surpassed the 14-year-old previous record set by the Ukrainian Mykyta Nesterenko by 1.24 meters. In August 2022, he was a silver medalist at the 2022 World Athletics U20 Championships in Cali, Colombia behind compatriot Marius Karges, despite only being able to make one throw in the final because of an abductor injury. He was awarded the German youth athlete of the year for 2022.

He missed a lot of the 2023 season with an ankle ligament injury. In April 2024, he threw a new German U23 record distance of 68.96 meters at the Oklahoma Throws Series meeting in Ramona. This also achieved the Olympic minimum standard for Paris 2024. The previous record was set by Wolfgang Schmidt in 1979.

In June 2024, he was selected for the 2024 European Athletics Championships in Rome, Italy. At the championships he threw 59.61 metres and did not proceed to the final. He finished third at the German U23 Championships in Monchengladbach in July 2024 with a throw of 62.09 metres. He competed in the discus throw at the 2024 Summer Olympics in Paris in August 2024, throwing 61.81 metres which was not sufficient to progress to the final.

He finished second at the 2025 European Athletics Team Championships First Division in Madrid on 28 June 2025 with 66.17 metres. He won the silver medal at the 2025 European Athletics U23 Championships in Bergen, part of a German 1-2-3 in the event, behind Steven Richter but ahead of Marius Karges. He won the gold medal ahead of Richter at the 2025 Summer World University Games in Bochum. In September 2025, he competed in the discus throw at the 2025 World Championships in Tokyo, Japan, qualifying for the final and placing eleventh overall.

== Personal life ==
He is from Hamburg. His younger brother Matti also competes in track and field and won bronze in the hammer throw and silver in the discus at the German U16 championships in Stuttgart in 2023.
