= Janne Läspä =

Finnish javelin thrower

Personal information
- National team: Finland
- Born: 2 April 2002 (age 24)

Sport
- Country: Finland
- Sport: Athletics
- Event: Javelin throw

Achievements and titles
- Personal best: Outdoor : 77.10 m (2021)
Medal record
World U20 Championships
Gold medal – first place	2021 Nairobi	Javelin throw

Janne Läspä (born 2 April 2002) is a Finnish athlete who specializes in the javelin throw. He was the gold medallist at the World Athletics U20 Championships in 2021.
