= Mykhailo Brudin =

Ukrainian athlete (born 2005)

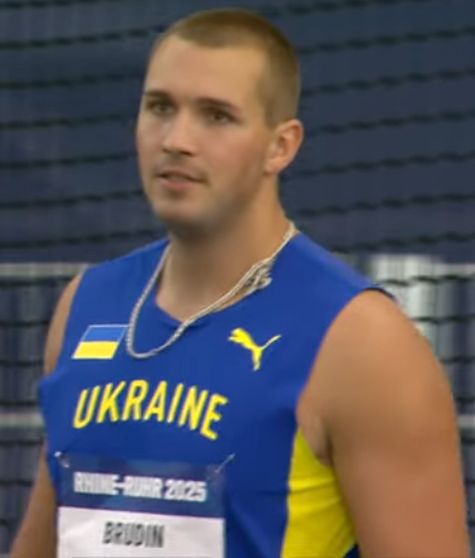
- At the 2025 Summer World University Games

Personal information
- Nationality: Ukraine
- Born: 3 January 2005 (age 21) Donetsk, Ukraine

Sport
- Sport: Athletics
- Event: Discus throw

Achievements and titles
- Personal best: Discus: 61.33m (2023)
Medal record
Men's athletics
Representing Ukraine
Summer World University Games
Bronze medal – third place	2025 Bochum	Discus
World U20 Championships
Bronze medal – third place	2022 Cali	Discus
European U20 Championships
Gold medal – first place	2023 Jerusalem	Discus
European U18 Championships
Gold medal – first place	2022 Jerusalem	Discus

Mykhailo Brudin (born 3 January 2005) is a Ukrainian discus thrower. He was European age-group champion at under-18 and under-20 level and was a bronze medalist at the 2022 World Athletics U20 Championships and the 2025 Summer World University Games.

== Career ==
Brudin was born in Donetsk and represents Donetsk Oblast. Prior to the Russian invasion of Ukraine, he trained in Druzhkivka but later settled in Spain and became a member of Numantino Athletics in La Rioja.

He won the gold medal at the 2022 European Athletics U18 Championships in Jerusalem, Israel. He won the bronze medal at the 2022 World Athletics U20 Championships in Cali, Colombia with a personal best throw of 63.30 metres.

He won the silver medal in the U23 category at the 2023 European Throwing Cup in Leiria, Portugal. He won the gold medal at the 2023 European Athletics U20 Championships in Jerusalem, Israel, winning by nearly seven metres with a world-leading U20 throw of 66.58 metres. He was nominated for the European Athletics Rising Star Award in 2023.

He won the silver medal in the U23 category at the 2024 European Throwing Cup in Leiria, Portugal. He finished fourth at the 2024 World Athletics U20 Championships in Lima, Peru with a throw of 61.69 metres.

He placed tenth overall at the 2025 European Athletics Team Championships First Division in Madrid, Spain. He placed fourth overall at the 2025 European Athletics U23 Championships in Bergen, Norway. He won the bronze medal at the 2025 Summer World University Games in Bochum, Germany.

Brudin won the U23 discus title at the 2026 European Throwing Cup in Nicosia, Cyprus, on 15 March 2026, taking the lead in the first round with a throw of 56.14 metres before improving to 57.80 m and then 58.55 m.
