= Artur Felfner =

Ukrainian javelin thrower (born 2003)

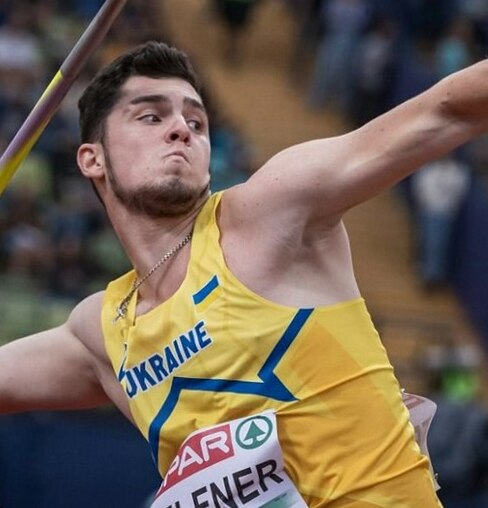
- Artur Felfner at the 2023 European Games

Personal information
- Born: 17 October 2003 (age 22) Konotop, Sumy Oblast, Ukraine

Sport
- Sport: Athletics
- Event: Javelin throw
- Coached by: Viacheslav Rymko
Medal record
Men's athletics
Representing Ukraine
European Games
Bronze medal – third place	2023 Kraków–Małopolska	Javelin throw
European U23 Championships
Gold medal – first place	2023 Espoo	Javelin throw
World U20 Championships
Gold medal – first place	2022 Cali	Javelin throw
Silver medal – second place	2021 Nairobi	Javelin throw
European U20 Championships
Gold medal – first place	2021 Tallinn	Javelin throw
European Team Championships
Silver medal – second place	2025 Madrid	Javelin throw
European Youth Summer Olympic Festival
Bronze medal – third place	2019 Baku	Javelin throw

Artur Serhiyovych Felfner (Ukrainian: Артур Сергійович Фельфнер; born 17 October 2003) is a Ukrainian athlete specialising in the javelin throw. He is multiple champion and medallist of World and European Junior and Youth Championships. He also competed at the 2022 European Athletics Championships where he finished 15th in the qualification for the javelin final.

== International competitions ==
Year	Competition	Venue	Position	Event	Notes
Representing Ukraine
2019	European Youth Olympic Festival	Baku, Azerbaijan	3rd	Javelin throw (700 g)	73.14 м
2021	World U20 Championships	Nairobi, Kenya	2nd	Javelin throw	76.32 m
2021	European U20 Championships	Tallinn, Estonia	1st	Javelin throw	78.41 m
2022	World U20 Championships	Cali, Colombia	1st	Javelin throw	79.36 m
2022	European Championships	Munich, Germany	15th (q)	Javelin throw	76.06 m
2023	European Games	Chorzów, Poland	3rd	Javelin throw	82.24 m EU23L
2023	European U23 Championships	Espoo, Finland	1st	Javelin throw	83.04 m NU23L
2023	World Championships	Budapest, Hungary	32nd (q)	Javelin throw	73.81 m
2024	European Championships	Rome, Italy	8th	Javelin throw	81.38 m
2024	Olympic Games	Paris, France	15th (q)	Javelin throw	81.84 m
2025	European U23 Championships	Bergen, Norway	1st	Javelin throw	81.14 m
2025	World Championships	Tokyo, Japan	33rd (q)	Javelin throw	76.13 m
2026	European Championships	Birmingham, United Kingdom	22nd (q)	Javelin throw	76.37 m
