= 2026 European Throwing Cup =

Athletics competition

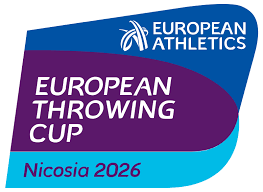
- Location: Nicosia, Cyprus
- Dates: 14–15 March 2026
- Competitors: 284 from 35 nations

The 2026 European Throwing Cup was held from 14 to 15 March 2026 in Nicosia, Cyprus.

== Results ==
WL - the best result on the world lists in 2025	EL - the best result on European lists in 2026	CR - European Cup record
NR - national record	PB - personal record	SB - the best result of the season

=== Men ===
==== Seniors ====
Event	Gold		Silver		Bronze		Source
Shot put	Konrad Bukowiecki; Poland	20.43	Nick Ponzio; Italy	19.97	Eric Favors; Ireland	19.68	
Discus throw	Steven Richter; Germany	67.29 SB	Alin Alexandru Firfircă; Romania	65.95 SB	Ruben Rolvink; Netherlands	65.47 SB	
Hammer throw	Volodymyr Myslyvčuk; Czech Republic	80.69 PB	Bence Halász; Hungary	80.31	Hilmar Örn Jónsson; Iceland	78.03 NR	
Javelin Throw	Nick Thumm; Germany	81.05	Simon Wieland; Switzerland	80.76	Michele Fina; Italy	79.95 PB	

==== U23 ====
Event	Gold		Silver		Bronze		Source
Shot put	Alexandr Mazur; Moldova	19.10	Leo Zikovic; Sweden	18.99	Lukas Schober; Germany	18.94	
Discus throw	Mykhailo Brudin; Ukraine	58.53 SB	Philipp Schmidli; Switzerland	56.62	Zsombor Dobó; Hungary	55.33	
Hammer throw	Ármin Szabados; Hungary	74.45	Iosif Kesidis; Cyprus	74.16	Georgios Papanastasiou; Greece	70.99	
Javelin Throw	Jan Výška; Czech Republic	79.71 PB	Ryan Jansen; Netherlands	78.86 PB	Rafael Mahiques; Spain	77.31 SB	

=== Women ===
==== Seniors ====
Event	Gold		Silver		Bronze		Source
Shot put	Katharina Maisch; Germany	18.32	Jessica Inchude; Portugal	18.12	Eliana Bandeira; Portugal	18.10	
Discus throw	Daria Zabawska; Poland	62.27	Melina Robert-Michon; France	60.03	Marike Steinacker; Germany	59.72	
Hammer throw	Katrine Koch Jacobsen; Denmark	75.52 PB	Nicola Tuthill; Ireland	72.48 PB	Guðrún Karítas Hallgrímsdóttir; Iceland	71.41 NR	
Javelin Throw	Jade Maraval; France	60.02 PB	Adriana Vilagoš; Serbia	59.85	Paola Padovan; Italy	58.69 PB	

==== U23 ====
Event	Gold		Silver		Bronze		Source
Shot put	Helena Kopp; Germany	16.29	Maria Rafailidou; Greece	16.04	Anna Musci; Italy	15.47	
Discus throw	Ebba Salomonsson Lind; Sweden	55.79 PB	Andrea Njimi Tankeu Djeudji; Spain	53.93 SB	Anne Juul Jensen; Denmark	52.59 SB	
Hammer throw	Patricia Kamga; Sweden	69.76 PB	Andrea Sales; Spain	68.91 PB	Florella Freyche; France	67.33	
Javelin Throw	Ellevine Kathleen Artesia Octavia; Norway	50.68	Fanni Kövér; Hungary	50.31 SB	Nina Reincke; Germany	47.49	

== Medal table ==
* Host nation (Cyprus)

Rank	Nation	Gold	Silver	Bronze	Total
1	Germany	4	0	3	7
2	Sweden	2	1	0	3
3	Czech Republic	2	0	0	2
3	Poland	2	0	0	2
5	Hungary	1	2	1	4
6	France	1	1	1	3
7	Denmark	1	0	1	2
8	Moldova	1	0	0	1
8	Norway	1	0	0	1
8	Ukraine	1	0	0	1
11	Spain	0	2	1	3
12	Switzerland	0	2	0	2
13	Italy	0	1	3	4
14	Greece	0	1	1	2
14	Ireland	0	1	1	2
14	Netherlands	0	1	1	2
14	Portugal	0	1	1	2
18	Cyprus*	0	1	0	1
18	Romania	0	1	0	1
18	Serbia	0	1	0	1
21	Iceland	0	0	2	2
Totals (21 entries)		16	16	16	48
