= Nick Thumm =

German javelin thrower (born 2004)

Personal information
- Born: 19 October 2004 (age 21)

Sport
- Sport: Athletics
- Event: Javelin throw
- Club: VfB Stuttgart

Achievements and titles
- Personal bests: Javelin: 83.76 (Birmingham, 2026)
Medal record
Men's athletics
Representing Germany
European Championships
| Silver medal – second place | 2026 Birmingham | Javelin throw |
European U23 Championships
| Silver medal – second place | 2025 Bergen | Javelin throw |
Summer World University Games
| Silver medal – second place | 2025 Bochum | Javelin throw |
European Throwing Cup
| Gold medal – first place | 2026 Nicosia | Javelin throw |
| Gold medal – first place | 2025 Nicosia | U23 Javelin throw |

Nick Thumm (born 19 October 2004) is a German javelin thrower. He was a silver medalist on his major championship debut representing Germany at the 2026 European Championships in England, where he threw a personal best 83.76 metres.

In 2025, he was also a silver medalist at the European U23 Championships and the World University Games.

== Biography ==
Thumm won the gold medal in the Under 23 javelin at the 2025 European Throwing Cup in Nicosia in March 2025, with a throw of 77.09 metres. Thumm won the silver medal at the 2025 European Athletics U23 Championships in Bergen, Norway with a personal best javelin throw of 80.74 metres.

Thumm was the silver medalist behind Simon Wieland in the javelin throw at the 2025 Summer World University Games in Bochum, Germany, with a throw of 77.91 metres.

In February 2026, Thumm won the senior German Outdoor Throwing Championships with a personal best 82.03 metres throw. The following month, he won the javelin throw at the 2026 European Throwing Cup in Nicolas, Cyprus, where he threw over 80 metres a number of times with a best throw of 81.05 metres to finish ahead of Wieland. On 15 August, Thumm threw a personal best of 83.76 metres to win the silver medal on his major championships debut at the 2026 European Athletics Championships in Birmingham, England. He had been leading the competition prior to a championship record throw over 90 metres by his compatriot Julian Weber in the final round.

== Personal life ==
From Stuttgart, he studied at the IU International University. He is coached by his father, Karsten Thumm.
