= Giovanni Frattini (javelin thrower) =

Italian javelin thrower (born 2002)

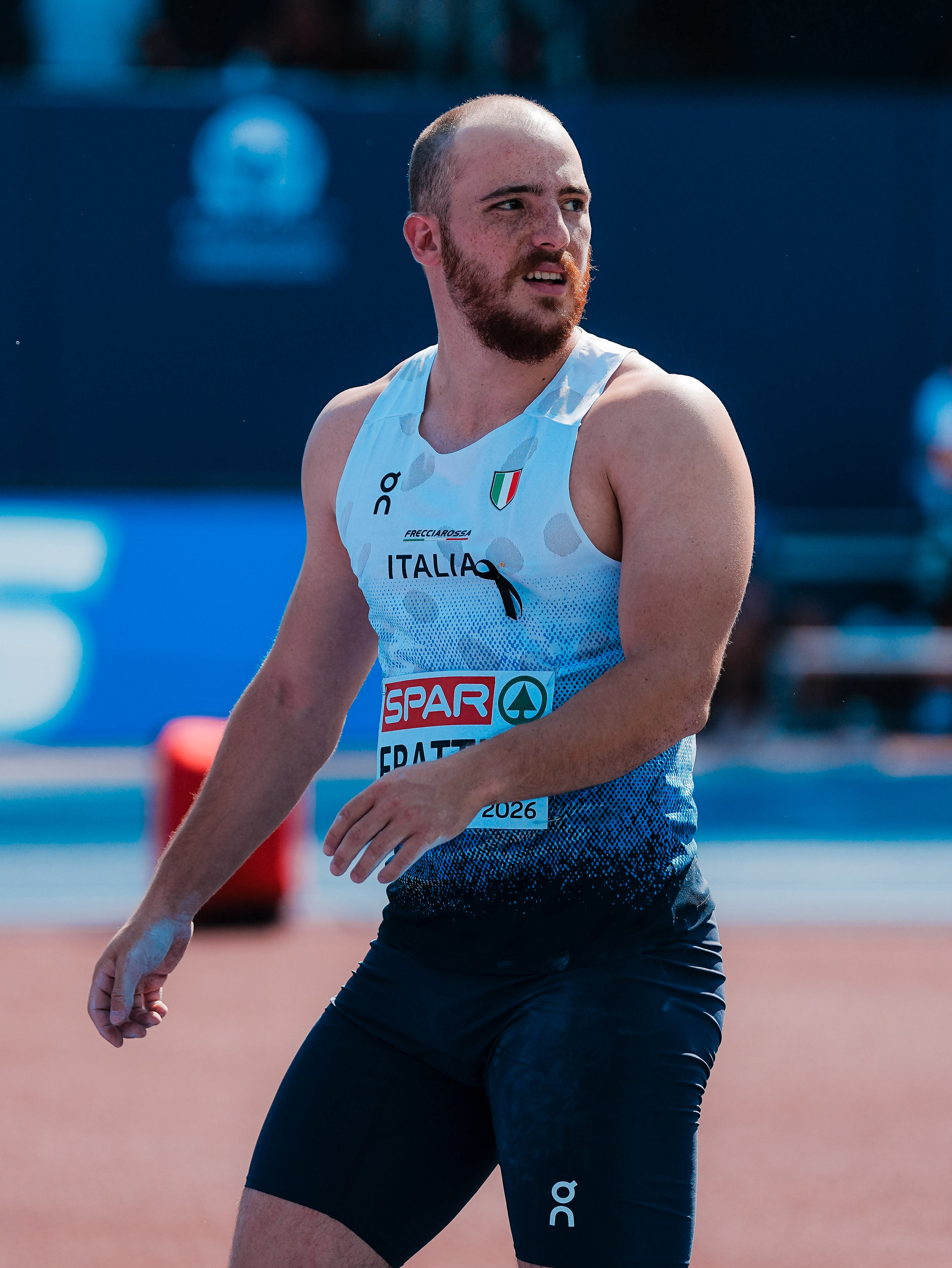
- Frattini at Birmingham 2026

Personal information
- Born: 24 October 2002 (age 23) Rimini, Italy
- Height: 1.78 m (5 ft 10 in)
- Weight: 87 kg (192 lb)

Sport
- Sport: Athletics
- Event: Javelin throw
- Club: Carabinieri Bologna
- Coached by: Antonio Fent

Achievements and titles
- Personal best: Javelin throw: 83.61 m (2024)
Medal record
Men's athletics
Representing Italy
European Throwing Cup
Silver medal – second place	2025 Nicosia	Javelin throw
Gold medal – first place	2024 Leiria	U23 javelin
Mediterranean Games
Gold medal – first place	2026 Taranto	Javelin throw

Giovanni Frattini (born 24 October 2002) is an Italian javelin thrower. He is a two-time Italian champion and won the silver medal at the 2025 European Throwing Cup.

== Biography ==
From Romagna, Frattini is coached by Emanuele Verni. Frattini won the under-23 javelin competition at the 2024 European Throwing Cup in Leiria, Portugal. In June, he won the senior Italian Athletics Championships with a throw of 75.40 metres. He threw a personal best of 83.61 metres at the Italian Club Championships in Modena in September 2024, to move to second on the Italian all-time list, behind only Carlo Sonego. It was a personal best of close to six metres.

Frattini won the silver medal at the 2025 European Throwing Cup in Nicosia, Cyprus, with a throw of 82.78 metres. In August 2025, he won the Italian Athletics Championships ahead of Michele Fina with a throw of 74.85 metres. He was a finalist at the 2025 Summer World University Games in Germany, with a best throw of 74.97 metres.

In August 2026, he was a finalist competing at the 2026 European Athletics Championships in Birmingham, England, placing ninth overall in the javelin throw.

== National titles ==
Frattini won five national championships at individual senior level.

- Italian Athletics Championships
  - Javelin throw: 2024, 2025, 2026
- Italian Winter Throwing Championships
  - Javelin throw: 2025, 2026

== See also ==
- Italian all-time lists – Javelin throw
