= Simon Wieland =

Swiss javelin thrower (born 2000)

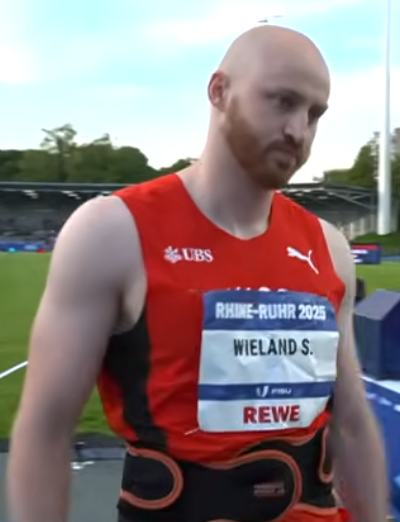
- At the 2025 Summer World University Games

Personal information
- Born: 16 December 2000 (age 25)

Sport
- Sport: Athletics
- Event: Javelin throw

Achievements and titles
- Personal bests: Javelin 82.26m (Tokyo, 2025) NR
Medal record
Men's athletics
Representing Switzerland
European Throwing Cup
Silver medal – second place	2026 Nicosia	Javelin throw
Summer World University Games
Gold medal – first place	2025 Bochum	Javelin throw
European U20 Championships
Gold medal – first place	2019 Borås	Javelin throw

Simon Wieland (born 16 December 2000) is a Swiss javelin thrower. He is the Swiss national record holder in the javelin, and competed at the 2025 World Athletics Championships.

== Biography ==
He qualified for the final of the 2018 World Athletics U20 Championships in Tampere, Finland, placing eighth with a throw of 70.51 metres. The following year, he won the gold medal in the javelin throw at the 2019 European Athletics U20 Championships in Borås, Sweden, with a throw of 79.44 metres. That year, he won the senior Swiss Athletics Championships for the first time, throwing 75.68 metres in Basel.

He won the gold medal in the javelin throw at the 2025 Summer World University Games in Bochum, Germany, in July 2025 with a best throw of 79.33 metres.

He threw a personal best 81.29m at the Diamond League Final in Zurich on 28 August 2025. He was selected for the Swiss team for at the 2025 World Athletics Championships in Tokyo, Japan, where he threw a Swiss national record with 82.26 metres, without advancing to the final.

In March 2026, he won the silver medal in the javelin throw at the 2026 European Throwing Cup in Nicolas, Cyprus, where he threw over 80 metres more than once with a best throw of 80.76 metres to finish runner-up to Germany's Nick Thumm. In August, he competed at the 2026 European Athletics Championships in Birmingham, England, in the javelin throw.

== Personal life ==
Wieland studied economics at the University of Bern.
