= Damian Rodziak =

Polish athlete (born 2003)

Personal information
- Nationality: Polish
- Born: 27 January 2003 (age 23)

Sport
- Country: Poland
- Sport: Athletics
- Event: Discus throw

Damian Rodziak (born 27 January 2003) is a Polish discus thrower. He won the Polish Athletics Championships in 2026.

== Biography ==
From Chromiec, Rodziak is one of three brothers who all compete in throwing events, including European junior champion Jakub. He is a member of LUKS Orkan Września and has been coached by Przemysław Pawlak since December 2023. Prior to that, Rodziak threw 55.54 metres and finished 14th in the discus throw at the 2022 World Athletics U20 Championships in Cali, Colombia.

Rodziak placed sixth in the discus throw at the 2025 European Athletics U23 Championships in Bergen, Norway, with a throw of 58.59 metres and later finish runner-up at the senior Polish Athletics Championships.

Rodziak had thrown a personal best 60.92 meters in 2025, but usurped that with a throw of 62.00 meters in March 2026 in placing seventh at the 2026 European Throwing Cup in Nicosia, Cyprus. In May 2026, Rodziak threw a personal best of 64.24 metres in Poznań which moved him into the top-ten on the Polish all-time list, and the furthest by a Polish athlete for three years. The throw came in a series in which five of his six attempts were better than his previous personal best.

He won the Polish Athletics Championships in July 2026 for his friend senior national title with a throw of 63.66 metres, and was selected to represent Poland at the 2026 European Athletics Championships in Birmingham, England.
