= List of South American under-18 records in athletics =

South American youth records in the sport of athletics are the all-time best marks set in competition by aged 17 or younger throughout the entire calendar year of the performance and competing for a member nation of the South American Athletics Confederation (Atletismo Sudamericano). CONSUDATLE maintains these records only in a specific list of outdoor events. All other records, including all indoor records, shown on this list are tracked by statisticians not officially sanctioned by CONSUDATLE.

== Outdoor ==
Key: Awaiting ratification Record not kept by CONSUDATLE Not ratified or later rescinded by CONSUDATLE

=== Boys ===
Event	Record	Athlete	Nationality	Date	Meet	Place	Age	Ref.
100 m	10.30 (+1.9 m/s)	Paulo André de Oliveira	Brazil	14 November 2015		Maringá, Brazil	17 years, 86 days	
200 m	20.67 (−1.0 m/s)	Vítor Hugo dos Santos	Brazil	14 July 2013	World Youth Championships	Donetsk, Ukraine	17 years, 163 days	
300 m	41.44	Bernardo Quinan Silva	Brazil	18 March 2025	Holmdel Spring Time trials	New Jersey, USA	14 years, 279 days	
400 m	46.23	Andrés Silva	Uruguay	21 June 2003	South American Championships	Barquisimeto, Venezuela	17 years, 89 days	
800 m	1:47.85	Joaquim Cruz	Brazil	30 August 1980		Sudbury, Canada	17 years, 171 days	
1500 m	3:47.35	Federico Bruno	Argentina	4 May 2010		Mar del Plata, Argentina	16 years, 320 days	
3000 m	8:18.64	Pablo Antonio Ñauta	Argentina	1 November 2025	South American U20 Championships	Lima, Peru	18 years, 200 days	
5000 m	14:31.81	Daniel do Nascimento	Brazil	31 July 2015		Edmonton, Canada	17 years, 3 days	
10,000 m								
110 m hurdles (91.4 cm)	13.20 (+1.7 m/s)	Vinicius de Brito	Brazil	2 September 2023	Jogos da Juventude	Pirassununga, Brazil	17 years, 183 days	
400 m hurdles (84 cm)	51.12	Mikael de Jesus	Brazil	22 August 2014	Youth Olympics	Nanjing, China	17 years, 3 days	
2000 m steeplechase	5:45.22	Daniel do Nascimento	Brazil	14 June 2015	Brazilian U18 Championships	São Bernardo do Campo, Brazil	16 years, 321 days	
3000 m steeplechase	8:39.45	Sergio Arezo	Uruguay	13 November 2011	Uruguayan Championships	Montevideo, Uruguay	17 years, 259 days	
High jump	2.18 m	Luciano Bacelli	Brazil	26 June 1983		São Paulo, Brazil		
Pole vault	5.51 m	Germán Chiaraviglio	Argentina	1 May 2004		Porto Alegre, Brazil	17 years, 15 days	
Long jump	7.97 m (+1.4 m/s)	Jhamal Bowen	Panama	11 May 2008		Barquisimeto, Venezuela	17 years, 124 days	
Triple jump	16.33 m (+2.0 m/s)	Miguel van Assen	Surinam	19 April 2014	CARIFTA Games	Fort-de-France, Martinique	16 years, 263 days	
Shot put (5 kg)	21.94 m	Nazareno Sasia	Argentina	12 October 2018	Youth Olympic Games	Buenos Aires, Argentina	17 years, 280 days	
Discus throw (1.5 kg)	67.05 m	Claudio Romero	Chile	23 September 2017		Santiago, Chile	17 years, 75 days	
Hammer throw (5 kg)	85.38 m	Joaquin Gomez	Argentina	30 November 2013	"Profesor Hugo La Nasa" Meet	Buenos Aires, Argentina	17 years, 47 days	
Javelin throw (800 g)	75.41 m	Edwin Cuesta	Venezuela	19 August 1998		Maracaibo, Venezuela		
Javelin throw (700 g)	89.34 m	Braian Toledo	Argentina	6 March 2010		Mar del Plata, Argentina	16 years, 179 days	
Octathlon	6456 pts	Andrés Silva	Uruguay	10–11 July 2003	World Youth Championships	Sherbrooke, Canada	17 years, 106 days	
Octathlon	100m (wind) / Long jump (wind) / Shot put / 400m / 110m H (wind) / High jump / Javelin / 1000m; 10.74 (+0.7 m/s) / 6.87 m (−0.3 m/s) / 14.76 m / 48.09 / 13.74 (+1.6 m/s) / 1.83 m / 43.58 m / 2:35.91							
Decathlon	7396 pts	Caio da Silva	Brazil	16 October 2016		São Bernardo do Campo, Brazil		
Decathlon	100m / Long jump / Shot put / High jump / 400m / 110m H / Discus / Pole vault / Javelin / 1500m							
5000 m walk (track)	20:13.69	Óscar Patín	Ecuador	11 October 2018	Youth Olympic Games	Buenos Aires, Argentina	17 years, 252 days	
10,000 m walk (track)	40:08.23 (Note: by official result source; 40:14.50 by CONSUDATLE, probably a typo)	Jefferson Pérez	Ecuador	10 August 1990	World Junior Championships	Plovdiv, Bulgaria	16 years, 40 days	
10 km walk (road)	41:32	David Hurtado	Ecuador	6 November 2016		Hauppauge, United States	17 years, 199 days	
20 km walk (road)								
4 × 100 m relay	40.77 A		Brazil	4 November 2000		Bogotá, Colombia		
4 × 400 m relay	3:14.39		Colombia	20 November 2011		Panama City, Panama		
Swedish medley relay	1:51.65		Brazil; Rafael da Silva Ribeiro; Bruno de Alcántara Goes; Jorge Celio da Rocha Sena; Diego Venancio	20 October 2002		Asunción, Paraguay		

=== Girls ===
Event	Record	Athlete	Nationality	Date	Meet	Place	Age	Ref.
100 m	11.39 (+1.1 m/s)	Franciela Krasucki	Brazil	13 July 2005	World Youth Championships	Marrakesh, Morocco	17 years, 48 days	
100 m	11.39 (+1.6 m/s)	Franciela Krasucki	Brazil	1 October 2005	South American Junior Championships	Rosario, Argentina	17 years, 128 days	
100 m	11.30	Ángela Tenorio	Ecuador	29 June 2013	Ecuadorian Junior Championships	Quito, Ecuador	17 years, 153 days	
200 m	23.13 (−0.1 m/s)	Angela Tenorio	Ecuador	14 July 2013	World Youth Championships	Donetsk, Ukraine	17 years, 168 days	
400 m	51.04	Kadecia Baird	Guyana	13 July 2012	World Junior Championships	Barcelona, Spain	17 years, 140 days	
800 m	2:06.81	Juliana Paula dos Santos	Brazil	6 August 2000		Rio de Janeiro, Brazil	17 years, 25 days	
1500 m	4:13.53	Yessica Quispe	Peru	16 October 2004		Lima, Peru	17 years, 269 days	
Mile	4:40.82	Lily Alder	Ecuador	5 April 2024	Arcadia Invitational	Arcadia, United States	16 years, 130 days	
3000 m	9:19.92	Yessica Quispe	Peru	11 September 2004		Lima, Peru	17 years, 234 days	
5000 m								
10,000 m								
Marathon								
100 m hurdles (76.2 cm)	13.04 A (+0.1)	Maribel Caicedo	Ecuador	16 July 2015	World Youth Championships	Cali, Colombia	17 years, 106 days	
100 m hurdles (84 cm)	13.72 (+0.6 m/s)	Gilda Massa	Peru	19 June 1993		Puerto la Cruz, Venezuela		
400 m hurdles	57.74	Valeria Cabezas	Colombia	25 August 2018	Ibero-American Championships	Trujillo, Peru	17 years, 221 days	
2000 m steeplechase	6:34.7 h	Sabine Heitling	Brazil	26 September 2004	South American Youth Championships	Guayaquil, Ecuador	17 years, 86 days	
3000 m steeplechase	10:14.52	Zulema Arenas	Peru	22 September 2012	South American Under-23 Championships	São Paulo, Brazil	16 years, 312 days	
High jump	1.85 m A	Orlane dos Santos	Brazil	17 June 1983		Mexico City, Mexico	16 years, 190 days	
High jump	1.85 m	María Fernanda Murillo	Colombia	13 November 2016	South American U18 Championships	Concordia, Entre Ríos, Argentina	17 years, 297 days	
Pole vault	4.40 m A	Robeilys Peinado	Venezuela	25 August 2013	Pan American Junior Championships	Medellín, Colombia	15 years, 272 days	
Long jump	6.41 m A (−0.2 m/s)	Natalia Linares	Colombia	13 December 2020	Grand Prix de Ecuador	Quito, Ecuador	17 years, 345 days	
Triple jump	13.60 m (+0.8 m/s)	Núbia Soares	Brazil	12 July 2013	World Youth Championships	Donetsk, Ukraine	17 years, 108 days	
Shot put (3 kg)	17.34 m A	Belsy Jenniffer Quiñonez	Chile	20 October 2024	Ecuadorian U18 Championships	Quito, Ecuador	17 years, 173 days	
Shot put (4 kg)	16.36 m	Natalia Duco	Chile	11 November 2006	South American U23 Championships	Buenos Aires, Argentina	17 years, 284 days	
Discus throw								
Hammer throw								
Javelin throw (500 g)	59.82 m	Juleisy Angulo	Ecuador	13 October 2018	Youth Olympic Games	Buenos Aires, Argentina	17 years, 284 days	
Javelin throw (600 g)	54.95 m A	Juleisy Angulo	Ecuador	29 September 2018	South American U-23 Championships	Cuenca, Ecuador	17 years, 270 days	
Heptathlon								
Heptathlon	100m H / High jump / Shot put / 200m / Long jump / Javelin / 800m							
5000 m walk (track)	21:53.8 h	Yuli Capcha	Peru	14 May 2011	Grand Prix Internacional de Marcha	Lima, Peru	16 years, 277 days	
5 km walk (road)	22:42+	Glenda Morejón	Ecuador	13 May 2017	Pan American Race Walking Cup	Lima, Peru	16 years, 348 days	
5 km walk (road)	21:16	Glenda Morejón	Ecuador	15 April 2017	National Racewalking Championships	Sucúa, Ecuador	16 years, 320 days	
5 km walk (road)	21:59	Paula Milena Torres	Ecuador	15 April 2017	National Racewalking Championships	Sucúa, Ecuador	16 years, 180 days	
10,000 m walk (track)								
4 × 100 m relay	45.75		Brazil; Tatiane de Paula Ferraz; Bárbara da Silva Leoncio; Vanda Ferreira Gomes; Josiane Valentim	31 July 2005		Windsor, Canada		
4 × 400 m relay	3:49.67		Brazil	20 October 1996		Asunción, Paraguay		
Swedish medley relay	2:06.60	Tatiane Ferraz; Vanda Gomes; Franciela Krasucki; Josiane Valentim	Brazil	17 July 2005	World Youth Championships	Marrakesh, Morocco	16 years, 252 days 17 years, 82 days	

== Indoor ==
=== Boys ===
Event	Record	Athlete	Nationality	Date	Meet	Place	Age	Ref.
55 m	7.04	Bernardo Quinan Silva	Brazil	10 December 2025	STCA Season Opener at the Bubble	New Jersey, United States	15 years, 181 days	
60 m								
200 m	25.17	Bernardo Quinan Silva	Brazil	15 December 2025	STCA Season Opener Ocean Breeze	Staten Island, United States	15 years, 186 days	
400 m								
800 m								
1500 m								
3000 m								
60 m hurdles								
High jump								
Pole vault	5.41 m	Germán Chiaraviglio	Argentina	6 October 2004	Festival Sudamericano de Garrocha	Santa Fe, Argentina	17 years, 173 days	
Long jump								
Triple jump								
Shot put								
Heptathlon								
Heptathlon	60m / Long jump / Shot put / High jump / 60m H / Pole vault / 1000m							
5000 m walk								
4 × 400 m relay								

=== Girls ===
Event	Record	Athlete	Nationality	Date	Meet	Place	Age	Ref.
60 m	7.42 A	Natalia Linares	Colombia	1 February 2020	South American Championships	Cochabamba, Bolivia	17 years, 29 days	
200 m	24.19 A	Natalia Linares	Colombia	2 February 2020	South American Championships	Cochabamba, Bolivia	17 years, 30 days	
400 m								
800 m								
1500 m								
3000 m								
60 m hurdles								
High jump								
Pole vault								
Long jump								
Triple jump								
Shot put								
Pentathlon								
Pentathlon	60m H / High jump / Shot put / Long jump / 800m							
3000 m walk								
4 × 400 m relay								
