= 1992 South American Youth Championships in Athletics =

XI South American Youth Championships in Athletics
- Dates: October 2–4
- Host city: Santiago, Chile
- Level: Youth
- Events: 38
- Participation: about 251 athletes from 11 nations

The 11th South American Youth Championships in Athletics were held in Santiago, Chile, from October 2–4, 1992.

== Medal summary ==
Medal winners are published for boys and girls. Complete results can be found on the "World Junior Athletics History" website.

=== Men ===
Event	Gold		Silver		Bronze	
100 metres (wind: 0.0 m/s)	Marcelo Sieburger (BRA)	11.32	Adriano Kantoviski (BRA)	11.36	Sergio Alessandría (ARG)	11.56
200 metres (wind: +0.6 m/s)	Daniel Sarmiento (URU)	22.23	Adriano Kantoviski (BRA)	22.57	José Vilches (VEN)	22.64
400 metres	Gustavo Aguirre (ARG)	49.99	Víctor Hugo Goulart (BRA)	50.03	Martín Guignard (ARG)	50.45
800 metres	Gustavo Aguirre (ARG)	1:57.27	Carlos Córcida (VEN)	1:57.40	Gustavo Rodrigues (BRA)	1:58.17
1500 metres	Marcelo da Silva (BRA)	3:59.19	Carlos Córcida (VEN)	4:00.65	Márcio da Silva (BRA)	4:01.34
5000 metres	Marcelo da Silva (BRA)	14:53.94	Clodoaldo da Silva (BRA)	15:00.96	Hugo Balbín (PER)	15:24.09
1500 metres steeplechase	Julián Peralta (ARG)	4:18.89	Carlos Torres (BRA)	4:18.93	Egon Epuyao (CHI)	4:29.71
110 metres hurdles (wind: +0.1 m/s)	Moisés Pereira (BRA)	14.27	Vladimir Zape (COL)	14.52	José David Riesco (PER)	15.07
300 metres hurdles	Víctor Hugo Goulart (BRA)	37.79	Marcelo Nunes (BRA)	38.78	Vladimir Zape (COL)	38.88
High jump	David Vilar (ARG)	2.03	Moisés Pereira (BRA)	2.00	Juan Carlos Chávez (ARG)	1.91
Pole vault	Francisco Hargous (CHI)	3.80	Francisco Rusillo (ARG)	3.80	Gerardo Zegers (CHI)	3.70
Long jump	Antonio Álvarez (COL)	6.73	Augusto Morelnitschke (BRA)	6.66	Sérgio dos Santos (BRA)	6.62
Triple jump	Sérgio dos Santos (BRA)	14.39	Antonio Álvarez (COL)	13.93	Juan Carlos Chávez (ARG)	13.86
Shot put	Francisco Pinter (ARG)	16.09	Jorge Vázquez (PAR)	14.75	José Ferreira (ARG)	14.68
Discus throw	Luciano Perufo (BRA)	50.60	Juan Cerra (ARG)	49.74	Jorge Paggi (ARG)	46.36
Hammer throw	Juan Cerra (ARG)	69.64	Sebastián Barlasina (ARG)	52.36	Marcos dos Santos (BRA)	46.52
Javelin throw	Marcelo Silva (BRA)	53.28	Diego Stucky (ARG)	50.60	Caio Leal (BRA)	49.98
Hexathlon	Moisés Pereira (BRA)	4172	Jeremy Racey (CHI)	3818	Carlos Vega (CHI)	3688
5000 metres track walk	Reinaldo Rosario (VEN)	22:10.07	Rolando Endara (BOL)	22:21.86	Omar Aguirre (ECU)	22:53.15
4 × 100 metres relay	Brazil; Sérgio dos Santos; Víctor Goulart; Marcelo Sieburger; Adriano Kantoviski	43.49	Uruguay; Luis Botto; Luis Junarena; Leonardo Pujadas; Daniel Sarmiento	43.53	Argentina; Sergio Alessandria; Fernando García; Martin Guignard; Daniel Ledesma	44.15
4 × 400 metres relay	Chile; Rodrigo Sandoval; Elias Zúñiga; Carlos Esperguel; Enrique Guzmán	3:27.08	Argentina; Pablo Martina; Daniel Ledesma; Julián Peralta; Martin Guignard	3:29.79	Uruguay; Christian Stahl; Luis Botto; Luis Junarena; Daniel Sarmiento	3:35.3

=== Women ===
Event	Gold		Silver		Bronze	
100 metres (wind: +1.4 m/s)	Gilda Massa (PER)	12.16	Helena Guerrero (COL)	12.25	Ana Caicedo (ECU)	12.39
200 metres (wind: -0.1 m/s)	Noelia Álvarez (COL)	25.46	Paola Restrepo (COL)	25.87	Adriana González (VEN)	25.93
400 metres	Raquel Maraviglia (ARG)	56.63	Noelia Álvarez (COL)	57.01	Xiomara Díaz (VEN)	58.31
800 metres	Miriam Achote (ECU)	2:15.93	Luciana França (BRA)	2:16.75	Soledad Galarza (ARG)	2:17.38
1500 metres	Miriam Achote (ECU)	4:38.63	Francislene da Silva (BRA)	4:42.42	Susana Trinak (ARG)	4:46.05
3000 metres	Miriam Achote (ECU)	9:47.20	Fabiana da Silva (BRA)	9:56.88	Bertha Sánchez (COL)	10:03.63
100 metres hurdles (wind: +0.3 m/s)	Gilda Massa (PER)	13.96	Kátia da Silva (BRA)	14.57	Gilvaneide de Oliveira (BRA)	14.68
300 metres hurdles	María Fernanda de Bastos (ARG)	44.34	Renata Brito (BRA)	44.85	Cristiane de Araújo (BRA)	45.43
High jump	Luciane Dambacher (BRA)	1.70	Solange Witteveen (ARG)	1.70	Teresa Rodríguez (VEN)	1.67
Long jump	Gilda Massa (PER)	5.63	Romina Varejão (ARG)	5.36	Helena Guerrero (COL)	5.31
Shot put	Fernanda de Oliveira (BRA)	12.28	Clara Palacios (COL)	11.67	Josiane Soares (BRA)	11.59
Discus throw	María Eugenia Giggi (ARG)	43.68	Candela Marchessi (ARG)	40.98	Katiuscia de Jesus (BRA)	39.52
Javelin throw	Patricia Alonso (VEN)	44.74	Sabina Moya (COL)	42.40	Romina Maggi (ARG)	40.40
Pentathlon	Kátia da Silva (BRA)	3166	Cleonice Ribeiro (BRA)	2965	Michelle León (CHI)	2915
3000 metres Track Walk	Ángela Araya (BOL)	14:40.94	María Vele (ECU)	15:17.59	Yolanda Duchi (ECU)	15:21.71
4 × 100 metres relay	Peru; Patricia Hasegawa; Gina Alvarado; Patricia Vargas; Gilda Massa	48.38	Brazil; Sandra Ferreira; Irene Boldrim; Cristiane Barbosa; Karina Fonseca	48.46	Uruguay; Alejandra Monza; Catherine Batalla; Adriana Manzilla; Rocío Cabrera	49.30
4 × 400 metres relay	Argentina; Lorena Gimenez; Andrea Bordalejo; Fernanda De Bastos; Raquel Maraviglia	3:55.70	Brazil; Renata Brito; Cristiane Barbosa; Freitas; Sandra Ferreira	3:56.73	Chile; Minerva Navarrete; Vasquez; Jessica Brito; Catherine Aravena	4:00.41

== Medal table (unofficial) ==
* Host nation (Chile)

Rank	Nation	Gold	Silver	Bronze	Total
1	Brazil	13	16	9	38
2	Argentina	10	8	10	28
3	Peru	4	0	2	6
4	Ecuador	3	1	3	7
5	Colombia	2	7	3	12
6	Venezuela	2	2	4	8
7	Chile*	2	1	5	8
8	Uruguay	1	1	2	4
9	Bolivia	1	1	0	2
10	Paraguay	0	1	0	1
Totals (10 entries)		38	38	38	114

== Participation (unofficial) ==
Detailed result lists can be found on the "World Junior Athletics History" website. An unofficial count yields the number of about 251 athletes from about 11 countries:

- Argentina (53)
- Bolivia (12)
- Brazil (51)
- Chile (51)
- Colombia (10)
- Ecuador (20)
- Panama (1)
- Paraguay (4)
- Peru (11)
- Uruguay (28)
- Venezuela (10)
