= Arturo Deliser =

Panamanian sprinter

Personal information
- Full name: Arturo Harmodio Deliser Espinosa
- Born: 24 April 1997 (age 29) Colón, Panama
- Home town: Panama City, Panama
- Height: 1.92 m (6 ft 4 in)
- Weight: 83 kg (183 lb)

Sport
- Sport: Running
- Event: Sprints

Achievements and titles
- Personal bests: 100 m: 10.95 (Mendoza 2012); 200 m: 21.31 (Mendoza 2012)
- Updated on 20 January 2015

Arturo Harmodio Deliser Espinosa (born 24 April 1997) is a Panamaian sprinter.

== Career ==
Deliser won both the 100 and 200 metres at the 2012 South American Youth Championships in Athletics in Mendoza, Argentina. In 2014, he competed in the boys' 100 metres event at the 2014 Summer Youth Olympics held in Nanjing, China.

== Personal life ==
Deliser spent some time in Pomona, California studying English at the Cal Poly Pomona English Language Institute, where he was highlighted as a spotlight student. He eventually transferred to a local community college to pursue his studies and joined the Mt. SAC Mounties track and field team.

== Personal bests ==
- 100 m: 10.56 s (wind: -1.0 m/s) – Cali, Colombia, 17 May 2014
- 200 m: 21.11 s (wind: 0.0 m/s) – Cali, Colombia, 29 November 2014

== Achievements ==
Year	Competition	Venue	Position	Event	Notes
Representing Panama
2011	Central American Age Group Championships (U16)	Managua, Nicaragua	1st	100 m	11.11 (wind: -0.6 m/s)
2011	Central American Age Group Championships (U16)	Managua, Nicaragua	1st	150 m	9.58 cr (wind: +2.0 m/s)
2011	Central American Age Group Championships (U16)	Managua, Nicaragua	2nd	300 m	36.86
2011	Central American Age Group Championships (U16)	Managua, Nicaragua	2nd	4 × 100 m relay	45.52
2011	Central American Age Group Championships (U16)	Managua, Nicaragua	2nd	Medley relay	2:05.90
2012	Central American Junior Championships (U18)	San Salvador, El Salvador	1st	100 m	11.20 (wind: -0.7 m/s)
2012	Central American Junior Championships (U18)	San Salvador, El Salvador	1st	200 m	22.05 (wind: +0.5 m/s)
2012	Central American Junior Championships (U18)	San Salvador, El Salvador	1st	4 × 100 m relay	43.82
2012	South American Youth Championships	Mendoza, Argentina	1st	100 m	10.95 (wind: -1.9 m/s)
2012	South American Youth Championships	Mendoza, Argentina	1st	200 m	21.31 (wind: -1.0 m/s)
2012	Central American Age Group Championships (U16)	San José, Costa Rica	1st	100 m	10.96 w (wind: +2.2 m/s)
2012	Central American Age Group Championships (U16)	San José, Costa Rica	1st	150 m	15.99 w (wind: +3.3 m/s)
2012	Central American Age Group Championships (U16)	San José, Costa Rica	1st	300 m	35.65
2012	Central American Age Group Championships (U16)	San José, Costa Rica	1st	4 × 100 m relay	44.88
2012	Central American Age Group Championships (U16)	San José, Costa Rica	1st	Medley relay	2:03.34
2013	Central American Games	San José, Costa Rica	5th	200 m	21.41 w (wind: +2.1 m/s)
2013	Central American Games	San José, Costa Rica	—	4 × 100 m relay	DNF
2013	Central American Youth Championships (U18)	San José, Costa Rica	1st	100 m	10.81 (wind: +0.4 m/s)
2013	Central American Youth Championships (U18)	San José, Costa Rica	1st	200 m	21.61 (wind: -0.4 m/s)
2013	Central American Youth Championships (U18)	San José, Costa Rica	—	4 × 100 m relay	DNF
2013	Central American Youth Championships (U18)	San José, Costa Rica	1st	Medley relay	1:57.06
2013	Central American Championships	Managua, Nicaragua	1st (h) (Note: Did not show in the final)	200 m	21.41 w (wind: +2.4 m/s)
2013	World Youth Championships	Donetsk, Ukraine	1st (h) (Note: Disqualified in the semifinal)	200 m	21.62 (wind: -0.1 m/s)
2013	South American Youth Games	Lima, Peru	1st	200 m	21.62 (wind: -0.6 m/s)
2013	South American Junior Championships	Resistencia, Argentina	2nd	200 m	21.18 w (wind: +4.5 m/s)
2014	South American Games	Santiago, Chile	—	200m	DNF
2014	Central American Youth Championships (U18)	Managua, Nicaragua	1st	100 m	10.78 (wind: -0.5 m/s)
2014	Central American Youth Championships (U18)	Managua, Nicaragua	—	4 × 100 m relay	DQ
2014	Central American and Caribbean Youth Championships (U18)	Morelia, Mexico	4th	100 m	10.85 (wind: +0.4 m/s)
2014	Central American and Caribbean Youth Championships (U18)	Morelia, Mexico	—	200 m	DNF
2014	Central American and Caribbean Youth Championships (U18)	Morelia, Mexico	—	4 × 100 m relay	DNF
2014	World Junior Championships	Eugene, United States	60th	200m	22.11 (wind: -0.3 m/s)
2014	Ibero-American Championships	São Paulo, Brazil	9th (h)	100 m	10.77 (-0.2 m/s)
2014	Youth Olympic Games	Nanjing, China	10th (B)	100m	10.91 (wind: -0.2 m/s)
2014	South American Youth Championships	Cali, Colombia	2nd	100m	10.66 (wind: +0.3 m/s)
2014	South American Youth Championships	Cali, Colombia	1st	200m	21.11 (wind: 0.0 m/s)
2015	South American Championships	Lima, Peru	3rd	200m	21.25 (wind: 0.0 m/s)
2018	Central American and Caribbean Games	Barranquilla, Colombia	25th (h)	100 m	10.86
2020	South American Indoor Championships	Cochabamba, Bolivia	5th	200 m	22.09
2023	Central American and Caribbean Games	San Salvador, El Salvador	16th (h)	100 m	10.88
2023	South American Championships	São Paulo, Brazil	12th (h)	200 m	21.28
2023	Pan American Games	Santiago, Chile	16th (h)	100 m	10.57
2024	Ibero-American Championships	Cuiabá, Brazil	6th	100 m	10.36
2024	Olympic Games	Paris, France	52nd (h)	100 m	10.35
2025	South American Indoor Championships	Cochabamba, Bolivia	8th	60 m	6.76
2025	South American Championships	Mar del Plata, Argentina	4th	100 m	10.20
2025	South American Championships	Mar del Plata, Argentina	3rd	200 m	20.67
2026	South American Indoor Championships	Cochabamba, Bolivia	11th (h)	60 m	6.86
2026	Ibero-American Championships	Lima, Peru	6th	100 m	10.25
2026	Ibero-American Championships	Lima, Peru	7th	200 m	21.11
2026	Pan American Championships	Medellín, Colombia	18th (h)	100 m	10.49
2026	Pan American Championships	Medellín, Colombia	17th (h)	200 m	21.35
2026	Central American and Caribbean Games	Santo Domingo, Dominican Republic	14th (h)	100 m	10.42
2026	Central American and Caribbean Games	Santo Domingo, Dominican Republic	17th (h)	200 m	21.35
