= Pedro Henrique Rodrigues =

Brazilian javelin thrower (born 1999)

Personal information
- Full name: Pedro Henrique Nunes Rodrigues
- Born: 18 June 1999 (age 27) Manaus, Brazil
- Height: 1.75 m (5 ft 9 in)
- Weight: 85 kg (187 lb)

Sport
- Sport: Athletics
- Event: Javelin throw
- Coached by: Margareth Bahia
Medal record
Men's athletics
Representing Brazil
Pan American Games
Silver medal – second place	2023 Santiago	Javelin throw

Pedro Henrique Nunes Rodrigues (born 18 June 1999) is a Brazilian athlete specialising in the javelin throw.

He won the gold medal at the 2024 Ibero-American Championships with a throw of 85.11 metres, which became the South American record at that time.

Being in 17th position out of 32 places in the international classification ranking for the javelin throw, he obtained a place for the 2024 Summer Olympics.

== International competitions ==
Year	Competition	Venue	Position	Event	Notes
Representing Brazil
2014	South American Youth Championships	Cali, Colombia	3rd	Javelin throw (700 g)	60.34 m
2016	South American U18 Championships	Concordia, Argentina	1st	Javelin throw (700 g)	77.30 m
2017	South American U20 Championships	Leonora, Guyana	1st	Javelin throw	69.71 m
2017	Pan American U20 Championships	Trujillo, Peru	1st	Javelin throw	74.58 m
2018	South American U18 Championships	Cuenca, Ecuador	1st	Javelin throw (700 g)	74.47 m
2018	World U20 Championships	Tampere, Finland	5th	Javelin throw	72.44 m
2018	South American U23 Championships	Cuenca, Ecuador	3rd	Javelin throw	71.57 m
2021	South American Championships	Guayaquil, Ecuador	2nd	Javelin throw	73.57 m
2021	South American U23 Championships	Guayaquil, Ecuador	6th	Javelin throw	66.73 m
2021	Junior Pan American Games (U23)	Cali, Colombia	1st	Javelin throw	74.41 m
2022	Ibero-American Championships	La Nucía, Spain	2nd	Javelin throw	80.74 m
2022	South American Games	Asunción, Paraguay	4th	Javelin throw	67.84 m
2023	South American Championships	São Paulo, Brazil	1st	Javelin throw	80.26 m
2023	World Championships	Budapest, Hungary	34th (q)	Javelin throw	72.34 m
2023	Pan American Games	Santiago, Chile	2nd	Javelin throw	78.45 m
2024	Ibero-American Championships	Cuiabá, Brazil	1st	Javelin throw	85.11 m
2024	Olympic Games	Paris, France	19th (q)	Javelin throw	80.67 m
2025	South American Championships	Mar del Plata, Argentina	1st	Javelin throw	77.92 m
2025	World Championships	Tokyo, Japan	25th (q)	Javelin throw	79.35 m
2026	Ibero-American Championships	Lima, Peru	1st	Javelin throw	81.37 m
2026	Pan American Championships	Medellín, Colombia	3rd	Javelin throw	78.96 m
2026	South American Games	Santa Fe, Argentina	2nd	Javelin throw	82.40 m

== Personal bests ==
- Javelin throw – 85.11 metres (Cuiabá 2024) former AR
