= 2024 South American U18 Championships in Athletics =

XXVII South American U18 Championships in Athletics
- Dates: 6 – 8 December
- Host city: San Luis, Argentina
- Venue: Centro de Desarrollo Deportivo Pedro Presti
- Level: U18
- Events: 39
- Participation: 12 nations

The 27th South American U18 Championships in Athletics were held at the Centro de Desarrollo Deportivo Pedro Presti in San Luis, Argentina, on 6, 7 and 8 December 2024.

== Medal summary ==
=== Boys ===
Event	Gold		Silver		Bronze	
100 metres -2.3 m/s	Gabriel Tibúrcio; Brazil	10.90	Yilmer Olano; Colombia	10.98	Santiago Lazar; Uruguay	11.01
200 metres +4.1 m/s	Tomás León; Chile	21.07	Yilmer Olano; Colombia	21.20	Juan Pablo Lyon; Chile	21.29
400 metres	Luigi Valenza; Argentina	48.59	Iván Maidana; Argentina	49.00	Fernando Ferreira; Brazil	49.08
800 metres	Giancarlo Bravo; Peru	1:56.87	Valdir Rocha Júnior; Brazil	1:58.48	Luan Gabriel Santos; Brazil	1:58.57
1500 metres	Giancarlo Bravo; Peru	3:58.85	Pablo Ñauta; Ecuador	4:01.97	Henrique Alencar; Brazil	4:03.28
3000 metres	Pablo Ñauta; Ecuador	8:32.04 CR	Edwar Márquez; Peru	8:32.17	Josué Vega; Ecuador	8:32.80
110 metres hurdles (91.4 cm) -1.9 m/s	José Luis Guevara; Ecuador	13.72	Santiago Quintero; Venezuela	13.77	Odair de Aguiar Júnior; Brazil	13.85
400 metres hurdles (84 cm)	Santiago Quintero; Venezuela	51.88	Germán Muñoz; Argentina	52.45	José Guzmán; Chile	52.89
2000 m steeplechase	Salvador Lucero; Argentina	6:00.44	Jordan Paredes; Ecuador	6:03.80	Josué Vega; Ecuador	6:03.86
4 × 100 metres relay	Brazil; Tiago Bomfim; Jean Augusto de Castro; Diogo Gomes; Gabriel Tibúrcio	41.60	Chile; Hernán Muñoz; Marc Anderson; Juan Pablo Lyon; Tomás León	41.66	Paraguay; Alexander Villalba; Alan Candia; Adrián Cespedes; Alan Dopke	42.41
10,000 m track walk	José Ccosco; Peru	46:39.56	Sebastián Barrera; Ecuador	46:40.54	Damián Ricardo; Argentina	47:56.28
High jump	Domingo Lorenzini; Chile	2.01	Thalisson Paim; Brazil	1.98	Jholeixon Rodríguez; Ecuador	1.98
Pole vault	Leonardo Olate; Chile	4.80	Kauan Batista; Brazil	4.50	Leonel Cuenca; Argentina	4.35
Long jump	Kauan de Vicente; Brazil	7.39w	Alexander Villalba; Paraguay	7.28	Gustavo Scolari; Brazil	7.05w
Triple jump	Guilherme Izidoro; Brazil	15.96w	Benjamin Oliveira; Brazil	15.55w	Jhon Lara; Ecuador	14.96
Shot put (5 kg)	Alessandro Soares; Brazil	19.70	Pyetro Souza; Brazil	16.62	Joaquín Díaz; Argentina	16.42
Discus throw (1.5 kg)	Damián Miño; Argentina	51.26	Alessandro Soares; Brazil	50.95	Alexis Velázquez; Argentina	49.67
Hammer throw (5 kg)	Nicolás Vergara; Chile	68.13	Gael Cardozo; Argentina	63.35	Cauã de Souza; Brazil	61.44
Javelin throw (700 kg)	Orlando Fernández; Venezuela	74.99	Pietro Silva; Brazil	68.13	Francisco Petri; Brazil	63.68
Decathlon (U18)	Ariff Pérez; Venezuela	6686	João Maranhão; Brazil	6669	David Vilela; Argentina	6139

=== Girls ===
Event	Gold		Silver		Bronze	
100 metres -2.7 m/s	Hakelly da Silva; Brazil	11.95	Cayetana Chirinos; Peru	12.35	Orihana Guzmán; Venezuela	12.41
200 metres +3.9 m/s	Marolyn Pastrana; Ecuador	24.30	Brandy Romero; Uruguay	24.34	Roxana Ramírez; Chile	24.36
400 metres	Isabella Hurtado; Colombia	56.71	Elena Oyarzun; Chile	57.13	Letícia Lopes; Brazil	58.16
800 metres	Pamela Barreto; Ecuador	2:11.99	Camila de Campos; Brazil	2:14.31	Emilia Martínez; Peru	2:16.98
1500 metres	Pamela Barreto; Ecuador	4:48.41	Irene Pernia; Argentina	4:48.58	Florencia Lara; Chile	4:49.72
3000 metres	Irene Pernia; Argentina	9:55.23	Pilar Ardiles; Chile	10:09.84	Natalia Hoyos; Colombia	10:13.55
100 metres hurdles (76.2 cm) -5.9 m/s	Michelle Ulabarri; Colombia	14.73	Leonor Ferreiro; Chile	14.76	Beatriz Silva; Brazil	14.81
400 metres hurdles	Larissa de Morais; Brazil	61.06	Ximena Vásquez; Peru	61.81	Emily Montaño; Colombia	63.54
2000 m steeplechase	Lisbeth Huarachi; Peru	7:27.13	Natally Alves; Brazil	7:33.40	Sofía Fregona; Argentina	7:38.90
4 × 100 metres relay	Chile; Leonor Ferreiro; Pilar Rodríguez; Elena Oyarzun; Roxana Ramírez	47.22	Brazil; Hemily Santos; Letícia Lopes; Isadora Pereira; Hakelly da Silva	47.34	Ecuador; Kristel Méndez; Valeska Valencia; Daniela Castro; Marolyn Pastrana	48.23
5000 m track walk	Katherine Barreto; Ecuador	24:31.46	María Elena Potilla; Ecuador	25:03.29	Valeria Tobón; Colombia	25:54.31
High jump	Jeraldine Pata; Ecuador	1.77	Madelaine da Silva; Brazil	1.65	Tatiana Díaz; Ecuador	1.60
Pole vault	María Fernanda Gómez; Colombia	3.30	Valentina Mozo; Chile	3.30	Florencia Britez; Paraguay	3.30
Long jump	Viviany de Lima; Brazil	6.09w	Valeska Valencia; Ecuador	6.04w	Milagros Damico; Argentina	5.91w
Triple jump	Viviany de Lima; Brazil	12.62w	Sofía Contreras; Chile	12.41w	Karine Martins; Brazil	12.36w
Shot put (3 kg)	Belsy Quiñónez; Ecuador	17.02	Edimara de Jesus; Brazil	16.17	Vitória Barreto; Brazil	14.22
Discus throw	Belsy Quiñónez; Ecuador	43.67	Emily da Silva; Brazil	42.74	Eliannys Sutil; Venezuela	38.40
Hammer throw (3 kg)	Carmela Cocco; Argentina	66.16	Kimberly Assiz; Brazil	64.40	Maria Laura Correa; Brazil	62.08
Javelin throw (500 g)	Sara de Almeida; Brazil	50.48	Maira Rosas; Argentina	49.03	Ilsa Córdoba; Colombia	48.29
Heptathlon (U18)	Angelina Muga; Argentina	4611	Julia Aere; Brazil	4606	Nayane Braga; Brazil	4381

=== Mixed ===
Event	Gold		Silver		Bronze	
8 × 300 metres relay	Brazil; João Maranhão; Hemily Santos; Alan da Silva; Luana Castro; Wilton Souza Júnior; Letícia Lopes; Fernando Ferreira; Larissa de Morais	5:03.32	Chile; José Guzmán; Roxana Ramírez; Beltrán Ayala; Pilar Rodríguez; Marc Anderson; Laura Díaz; Tomás León; Elena Oyarzun	5:05.20	Argentina; Manuel Juárez; Nazarena Bergamaschi; Germán Muñoz; Delfina Molina; Iván Maidana; Milagros Damico; Luigi Valenza; Celeste Molina	5:07.58

== Medal table ==
* Host nation (Argentina)

Rank	Nation	Gold	Silver	Bronze	Total
1	Brazil (BRA)	11	16	13	40
2	Ecuador (ECU)	9	5	6	20
3	Argentina (ARG)*	6	5	8	19
4	Chile (CHI)	5	7	4	16
5	Peru (PER)	4	3	1	8
6	Colombia (COL)	3	2	4	9
7	Venezuela (VEN)	3	1	2	6
8	Paraguay (PAR)	0	1	2	3
9	Uruguay (URU)	0	1	1	2
10	Bolivia (BOL)	0	0	0	0
10	Guatemala (GUA)	0	0	0	0
10	Panama (PAN)	0	0	0	0
Totals (12 entries)		41	41	41	123
