= Vitor Hugo dos Santos =

Brazilian sprinter (born 1996)

Vítor Hugo dos Santos
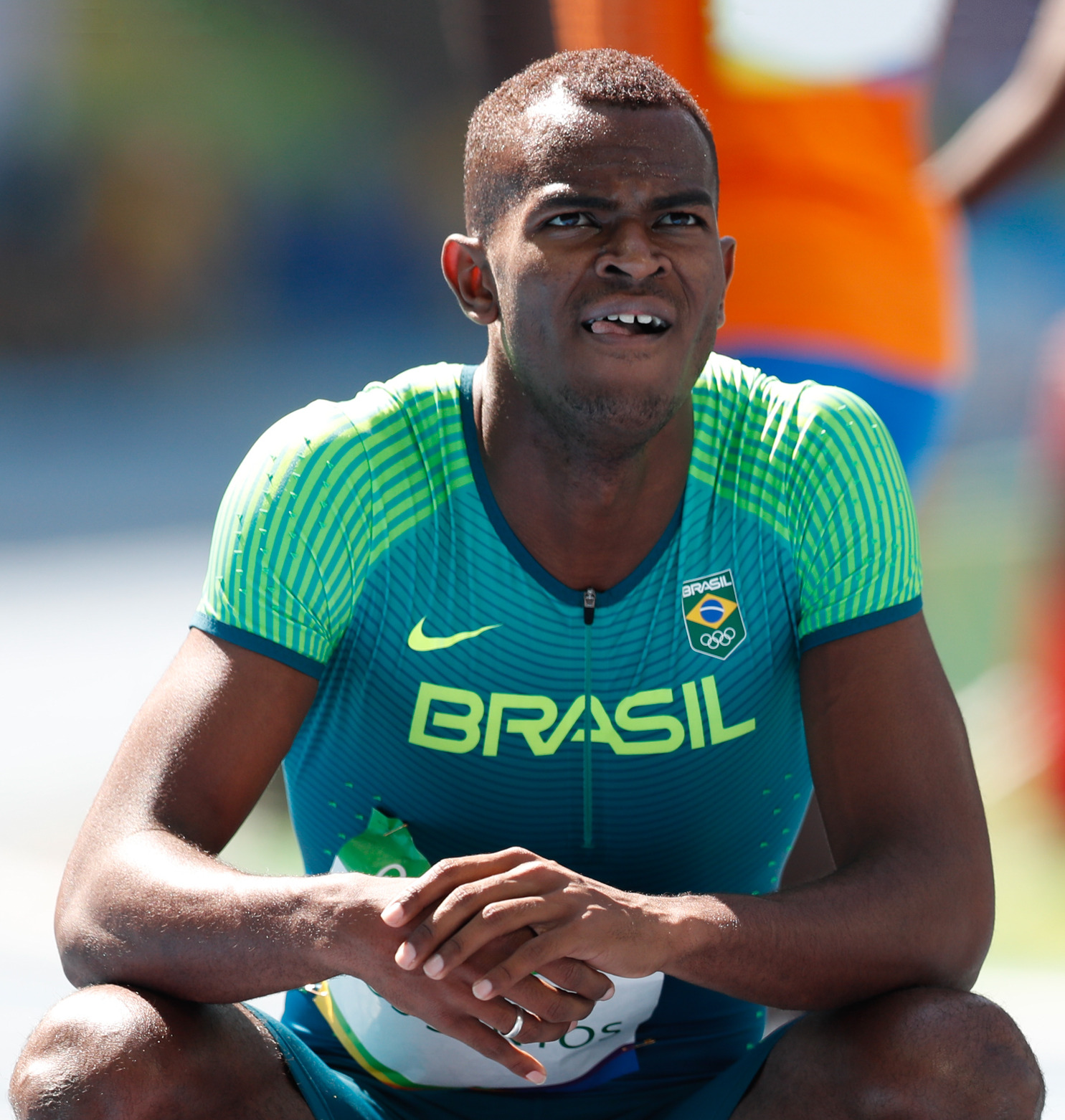
- Santos at the 2016 Olympics

Personal information
- Nationality: Brazil
- Born: 1 February 1996 (age 30) Rio de Janeiro, Brazil
- Height: 1.85 m (6 ft 1 in)
- Weight: 74 kg (163 lb)

Sport
- Sport: Athletics
- Event: Sprints

Achievements and titles
- Personal best(s): 100 m: 10.07 (2019); 200 m: 20.21 (2018)
Medal record
Representing Brazil
World Youth Championships in Athletics
Silver medal – second place	2013 Donetsk	200 m
South American Youth Championships
Gold medal – first place	2012 Mendoza	4×100 m relay
Silver medal – second place	2012 Mendoza	200 m

Vítor Hugo Silva Mourão dos Santos (born 1 February 1996) is a Brazilian sprinter. He won a gold medal in the 4 × 100 m relay and a silver medal in the 200 metres at the 2012 South American Youth Championships in Athletics in Mendoza, Argentina.
