= 2018 South American U18 Championships in Athletics =

XXIV South American U18 Championships in Athletics
- Dates: 30 June – 1 July
- Host city: Cuenca (Ecuador)
- Venue: Jefferson Pérez Stadium
- Level: Youth
- Events: 39
- Participation: 14 nations

The 24th South American U18 Championships in Athletics were held in Cuenca, Ecuador on 30 June and 1 July 2018.

== Medal summary ==
=== Men ===
Event	Gold		Silver		Bronze	
100 metres -0.8 m/s	Gian Carlos Mosquera; Colombia	10.75	Mateo Vargas; Paraguay	10.82	Steeven Salas; Ecuador	10.92
200 metres -0.4 m/s	Lucas Vilar; Brazil	21.34	Gian Carlos Mosquera; Colombia	21.57	Alexander Salazar; Panama	21.89
400 metres	Caio de Almeida; Brazil	48.20	Lucas Vilar; Brazil	48.34	Alexander Salazar; Panama	49.64
800 metres	Jhonatan Rodríguez; Colombia	1:54.18	Jorge Luis Tamay; Ecuador	1:55.82	Lucas Leite; Brazil	1:56.36
1500 metres	Lucas Leite; Brazil	4:11.90	Esteban González; Colombia	4:13.65	Daniel Taramuel; Ecuador	4:14.00
3000 metres	Antony Saenz; Peru	9:07.75	Julio Palomino; Peru	9:12.47	Dylan Van Der Hock; Argentina	9:16.74
110 metres hurdles (91.4 cm)	Marcos Paulo Ferreira; Brazil	13.69	Eric Vitor Campos; Brazil	13.90	Martín Sáenz; Chile	13.95
400 metres hurdles (84 cm)	Caio de Almeida; Brazil	52.09	João Carlos dos Santos; Brazil	52.27	Pedro Garrido; Argentina	53.96
2000 m steeplechase	Diego Muñoz; Colombia	6:26.40	Julio Palomino; Peru	6:28.09	Leonardo do Nascimento; Brazil	6:29.11
4 × 100 metres relay	Brazil; Lucas Vilar; Marcos Paulo Ferreira; Caio de Almeida; Eric Vitor Campos	41.33	Ecuador; Iván Pizarro; Anderson Marquinez; Mario Landucci; Steeven Salas	41.69	Peru; Hugo Carazas; Guillermo Herrera; Santiago Varillas; Jorge Ordemar	44.19
10,000 m track walk	Oscar Patín; Ecuador	46:54.86	Kevin Cahuana; Peru	47:18.74	Erik Carhuallanqui; Peru	48:13.12
High jump	Elton Petronilho; Brazil	2.01	Augusto de Campos; Brazil	2.01	Justin Herrera; Ecuador	2.01
Pole vault	Pablo Zaffaroni; Argentina	4.90	José Tomás Nieto; Colombia	4.80	Santiago Thomson; Colombia	4.70
Long jump	Adrian Vieira; Brazil	7.45	Navaro Aboikonie; Suriname	7.45	Daniel Mejicano; Venezuela	7.37w
Triple jump	Kevin Bueno; Ecuador	15.38	Luciano Mendez; Argentina	15.25	Marco Ponce; Ecuador	15.17
Shot put (5 kg)	Nazareno Sasia; Argentina	21.40 GR	Lazaro Bonora; Argentina	17.97	Vitor Gabriel Motin; Brazil	17.69
Discus throw (1.5 kg)	Vitor Gabriel Motin; Brazil	58.03	Nazareno Sasia; Argentina	57.19	Lazaro Bonora; Argentina	54.75
Hammer throw (5 kg)	Luis Alberto Ochoa; Colombia	73.24	Erick Barbosa; Colombia	73.24	Julio Nobile; Argentina	71.29
Javelin throw (700 kg)	Pedro Henrique Rodrigues; Brazil	74.47	Joel Benítez; Venezuela	70.71	Ignacio Toledo; Chile	69.46
Decathlon (U18)	Henrique Pereira; Brazil	6716	Jonathan Da Silva; Brazil	6387	Nicolas Viera; Argentina	6170

=== Women ===
Event	Gold		Silver		Bronze	
100 metres -1.3 m/s	Anahí Suárez; Ecuador	11.84	Angie González; Colombia	12.03	Orangy Jiménez; Venezuela	12.06
200 metres +0.6 m/s	Anahí Suárez; Ecuador	23.57	Angie González; Colombia	24.18	Aimara Nazareno; Ecuador	24.51
400 metres	Jessica Moreira; Brazil	56.02	Erica Cavalheiro; Brazil	56.17	Eliana Fuentes; Colombia	57.24
800 metres	Laura Acuña; Chile	2:13.01	María Veronica Pérez; Argentina	2:13.96	Eliana Fuentes; Colombia	2:16.27
1500 metres	Laura Acuña; Chile	4:44.98	Irene Navarrete; Ecuador	4:46.96	Angie Coronado; Colombia	4:49.55
3000 metres	Alejandra Sierra; Colombia	10:29.36	Inocencia Huacasi; Peru	10:37.64	Angie Coronado; Colombia	10:39.26
100 metres hurdles (76.2 cm) +0.5 m/s	Aimara Nazareno; Ecuador	13.86	Daniela Mena; Colombia	13.95	Valeria Cabezas; Colombia	13.99
400 metres hurdles	Valeria Cabezas; Colombia	59.64	Jessica Moreira; Brazil	60.42	Vivica Ifeoma Ilobi; Brazil	62.52
2000 m steeplechase	Veronica Hilario; Peru	7:18.30	María Eugenia Once; Ecuador	7:24.35	Lesli Chasiluisa; Ecuador	7:37.68
4 × 100 metres relay	Ecuador; Gloria Rambay; Aimara Nazareno; Nicole Jazmine Chala; Anahí Suárez	46.94	Brazil; Thais Michele da Silva; Erica Cavalheiro; Vivica Ifeoma Ilobi; Vitoria Jardim	47.28	Peru; Jasmin Figueroa; Mariana Olivares; Karina Iwamoto; Gabriela Gabriela	49.52
5000 m track walk	María Villalva; Ecuador	24:17.79	Freysi Donaires; Peru	25:44.56	Norita Huamani; Peru	25:53.91
High jump	Arielly Monteiro; Brazil	1.73	Indiana Holgado; Argentina	1.65	Monica Montero; Chile	1.65
Pole vault	Karen Bedoya; Colombia	3.60	Luciana Gómez; Argentina	3.55	Javiera Contreras; Chile	3.50
Long jump	Rocio Muñoz; Chile	6.04	Lissandra Campos; Brazil	5.99	Sofía Aylén Levrino; Argentina	5.76
Triple jump	Nerisnelia Sousa; Brazil	12.68	Monifah Latavia Djoe; Suriname	12.46	Rocio Muñoz; Chile	12.28
Shot put (3 kg)	Lorna Zurita; Ecuador	15.84	Rafaela de Sousa; Brazil	15.52	Javiera Bravo; Chile	14.70
Discus throw	Merari Herrera; Ecuador	44.97	Dahiana López; Uruguay	40.17	Esmirnova Borja; Ecuador	39.30
Hammer throw (3 kg)	Carolina Ulloa; Colombia	65.92 GR	Silenis Vargas; Venezuela	62.31	Valentina Clavería; Chile	60.57
Javelin throw (500 g)	Juleisy Angulo; Ecuador	54.33 GR	Lucerys Suarez; Colombia	49.95	Avigail Pino; Colombia	49.27
Heptathlon (U18)	Sara Isabel García; Colombia	5036	Larissa de Souza; Brazil	4335	Genesis Foronda; Ecuador	4146

=== Mixed ===
Event	Gold		Silver		Bronze	
8 × 300 metres relay	Brazil; João Carlos dos Santos; Erica Cavalheiro; Lucas Vilar; Jessica Moreira; Vitoria Jardim; Marcos Paulo Ferreira; Vivica Ifeoma Ilobi; Caio de Almeida	4:54.20	Ecuador; Miguel Ángel Maldonado; Andrés Gaigua; Britney Pachito; Andreina Minda; Ángel David Paredes; Ruth Ramírez; Isabel Cristina Oyervide; Kenny Leon	5:04.98	Colombia; Sebastián Barrera; Eliana Fuentes; Daniela Mena; Gian Carlos Mosquera; Alejandra Sierra; Valeria Cabezas; José Tomás Nieto; Jhonatan Rodríguez	5:15.01

== Medal table ==
Rank	Nation	Gold	Silver	Bronze	Total
1	Brazil (BRA)	14	11	5	30
2	Ecuador (ECU)	10	6	9	25
3	Colombia (COL)	9	8	8	25
4	Argentina (ARG)	3	6	6	15
5	Chile (CHI)	3	0	6	9
6	Peru (PER)	2	5	4	11
7	Suriname (SUR)	0	2	0	2
8	Venezuela (VEN)	0	1	2	3
9	Paraguay (PAR)	0	1	0	1
9	Uruguay (URU)	0	1	0	1
11	Panama (PAN)	0	0	2	2
Totals (11 entries)		41	41	42	124
