= 1996 South American Youth Championships in Athletics =

XIII South American Youth Championships in Athletics
- Dates: October 18–20
- Host city: Asunción, Paraguay
- Level: Youth
- Events: 38
- Participation: about 268 athletes from 10 nations

The 13th South American Youth Championships in Athletics were held in Asunción, Paraguay from October 18–20, 1996.

== Medal summary ==
Medal winners are published for boys and girls. Complete results can be found on the "World Junior Athletics History" website.

=== Men ===
Event	Gold		Silver		Bronze	
100 metres (wind: -1.1 m/s)	Helly Ollarves (VEN)	11.11	Carlos Santos (BRA)	11.16	Edison Núñez (COL)	11.29
200 metres (wind: -4.1 m/s)	Helly Ollarves (VEN)	22.74	Jorge Maidana (ARG)	22.80	Carlos Santos (BRA)	22.87
400 metres	Humberto de Oliveira (BRA)	49.12	Amauri dos Santos (BRA)	49.13	Paul Ríos (COL)	49.64
800 metres	Gilberto dos Santos (BRA)	1:58.23	Glauco da Silva (BRA)	1:58.25	Rodrigo Escobar (CHI)	1:58.90
1500 metres	André da Silva (BRA)	4:02.54	Sebastián González Cabot (ARG)	4:03.26	Rodrigo Escobar (CHI)	4:04.44
5000 metres	André da Silva (BRA)	15:10.74	Ricardo Franzón (ARG)	15:44.78	Esteban Coria (ARG)	15:49.11
1500 metres steeplechase	Leonardo Muntada (BRA)	4:20.51	Sebastián González Cabot (ARG)	4:24.80	Esteban Coria (ARG)	4:27.54
110 metres hurdles (wind: +2.1 m/s)	Cristián Labra (CHI)	14.59 w	Gabriel Morales (ARG)	14.62 w	Wellington Silva (BRA)	14.68 w
300 metres hurdles	Jackson Quiñónez (ECU)	38.1	Xavier Caicedo (ECU)	38.3	Luiz Lima (BRA)	39.1
High jump	Leandro de Jesus (BRA)	1.99	Piero Vojvodic (PER)	1.96	Wilfried Heim-Caballero (PAR)	1.90
Pole vault	Francisco Pintos (CHI)	4.30	Gastón González (CHI)	4.30	Daniel Kassab (BRA)	4.15
Long jump	Cristian Setién (ARG)	6.74	Pablo Quiroga (CHI)	6.59	Marcelo Ibarra (CHI)	6.55
Triple jump	Alessandro Bonfim (BRA)	14.22	Pablo Quiroga (CHI)	13.77	Eduardo Adão (BRA)	13.43
Shot put	Julián Angulo (COL)	16.68	Hugo Zambelli (ARG)	16.10	Fernando Furlan (BRA)	15.30
Discus throw	Julián Angulo (COL)	51.44	Carlos Sosa (ARG)	44.34	Fernando Furlan (BRA)	42.72
Hammer throw	Leandro Gallay (ARG)	62.52	Gilbert Volta (PER)	56.38	Fernando Crovetto (ARG)	55.28
Javelin throw	Leandro de Souza (BRA)	53.34	Edwin Cuesta (VEN)	52.60	Carlos Sosa (ARG)	52.10
Hexathlon	Wilfried Heim-Caballero (PAR)	3794	Bruno Reis (BRA)	3670	Gabriel Fuchslocher (CHI)	3560
5000 metres track walk	Paulo Ruiz (BRA)	24:08.74	Cristián Muñoz (CHI)	24:08.82	Evandro Mafra (BRA)	24:27.30
4 × 100 metres relay	Brazil; Carlos Santos; Jarbas Mascarenhas; Glauco Santos; Gabriel Malateaux	42.95	Argentina; Gabriel Morales; Diego Ternavasio; Cristian Setién; Jorge Maidana	43.59	Colombia; Edison Núñez; Jairo Mejía; Paulo Ríos; Aldernar Álvarez	43.97
4 × 400 metres relay	Brazil; Humberto de Oliveira; Cristian Dunker; Carlos Santos; Rodolfo dos Santos	3:18.42	Argentina; Jorge Maidana; Pablo Blanco; Lucas Altamirano; Carlos Borda	3:25.53	Uruguay; Diego Dos Santos; Pablo Martínez; Agustín Gómez; Lucas Martiarena	3:26.01

=== Women ===
Event	Gold		Silver		Bronze	
100 metres (wind: +0.9 m/s)	Sandra Reátegui (PER)	12.11	Silvana Belfiglio (ARG)	12.13	Juliana Pereira (BRA)	12.33
200 metres (wind: -1.6 m/s)	Sandra Reátegui (PER)	25.38	Ana Mariuxi Caicedo (ECU)	25.45	Juliana Pereira (BRA)	25.65
400 metres	Norbelis Bracho (VEN)	56.06	Rúbia dos Santos (BRA)	56.06	Flávia da Silva (BRA)	57.17
800 metres	Christiane dos Santos (BRA)	2:13.16	Vanesa Maraviglia (ARG)	2:13.26	Maritza Córdoba (COL)	2:14.21
1500 metres	Valquíria dos Santos (BRA)	4:37.68	Faustina Huamaní (PER)	4:40.84	Mabel Valenzuela (CHI)	4:41.54
3000 metres	Faustina Huamaní (PER)	9:54.71	Tatiane Sá (BRA)	9:55.15	Mabel Valenzuela (CHI)	10:10.82
100 metres hurdles (wind: 0.0 m/s)	Rúbia dos Santos (BRA)	14.75	Sicylle Jeria (CHI)	14.76	Sira Córdoba (COL)	14.88
300 metres hurdles	Rúbia dos Santos (BRA)	43.18	Sira Córdoba (COL)	44.35	María Virginia Firpo (ARG)	44.39
High jump	Delfina Blaquier (ARG)	1.75	Jorgelina Rodríguez (ARG)	1.68	Paola Hoffmann (CHI)	1.68
Long jump	Gisele de Oliveira (BRA)	5.71	Ana Mariuxi Caicedo (ECU)	5.68	Andrea Luchisano (ARG)	5.63
Shot put	Melisa Bolis (ARG)	11.98	Leomelina Blandón (COL)	11.81	Fernanda Resende (BRA)	11.63
Discus throw	María Cubillán (VEN)	39.02	Analía Piñero (ARG)	38.10	Michele Brustolin (BRA)	37.48
Javelin throw	Denise Pintos (URU)	38.76	Roxana Fernández (ARG)	38.16	Selma Dias (BRA)	37.78
Pentathlon	Valeria Schönstedt (CHI)	3288	Raquel de Oliveira (BRA)	3165	Joana Ribeiro (BRA)	3018
3000 metres Track Walk	Luisa Paltín (ECU)	15:00.1	Tatiana Silva (BOL)	15:01.8	Yesenia López (COL)	15:31.7
4 × 100 metres relay	Brazil; Flávia da Silva; Eliana de Oliveira; Juliana Pereira; Vanesa de Oliveira	47.81	Argentina; Juliana Santos; Andrea Luchisano; Agustina Rodríguez; Silvana Belfiglio	48.55	Chile; Daniela Pávez; Ximena Henríquez; Carolina Matesic; Denise Landon	48.57
4 × 400 metres relay	Brazil; Flávia da Silva; Mislene da Silva; Adriana da Silva; Rúbia dos Santos	3:49.67	Colombia; Melisa Murillo; Sira Córdoba; Maritza Córdoba; Victoria Mosquera	3:55.55	Chile; Ximena Henríquez; Cristina Aguirre; Carolina Matesic; Paula Osorio	3:56.55

== Medal table (unofficial) ==
* Host nation (Paraguay)

Rank	Nation	Gold	Silver	Bronze	Total
1	Brazil (BRA)	18	7	15	40
2	Argentina (ARG)	4	15	6	25
3	Venezuela (VEN)	4	1	0	5
4	Chile (CHI)	3	5	9	17
5	Peru (PER)	3	3	0	6
6	Colombia (COL)	2	3	6	11
7	Ecuador (ECU)	2	3	0	5
8	Paraguay (PAR)*	1	0	1	2
8	Uruguay (URU)	1	0	1	2
10	Bolivia (BOL)	0	1	0	1
Totals (10 entries)		38	38	38	114

== Participation (unofficial) ==
Detailed result lists can be found on the "World Junior Athletics History" website. An unofficial count yields the number of about 268 athletes from about 10 countries:

- Argentina (49)
- Bolivia (14)
- Brazil (57)
- Chile (45)
- Colombia (21)
- Ecuador (11)
- Paraguay (26)
- Peru (9)
- Uruguay (28)
- Venezuela (8)
