= 2012 South American Youth Championships in Athletics =

American Youth Championships in Athletics

XXI South American Youth Championships in Athletics
- Dates: October 26–28
- Host city: Mendoza, Argentina
- Venue: Parque San Martín
- Level: Youth
- Events: 40
- Participation: 316/307 + 1 guest athletes from 10 + 1 guest nations

The 21st South American Youth Championships in Athletics were held at the Parque San Martín in Mendoza, Argentina between October 26–28, 2012. A detailed discussion of the results was given elsewhere.

== Medal summary ==
Complete results can be found on the CONSUDATLE website. Detailed result lists can also be found on the "World Junior Athletics History" website.

=== Men ===
Event	Gold		Silver		Bronze	
100 metres (wind: -1.9 m/s)	Arturo Deliser (PAN)	10.95	Yeiker Mendoza (VEN)	10.99	Sebastian Acevedo (ARG)	11.06
200 metres (wind: -1.0 m/s)	Arturo Deliser (PAN)	21.31	Vitor dos Santos (BRA)	21.49	Jonatan Rodrigues (BRA)	21.84
400 metres	William Landazury (COL)	48.88	Eudy Roberti (VEN)	49.03	Rafael Peres (BRA)	49.08
800 metres	Jorge Collares (URU)	1:51.69	Marcello Marques (BRA)	1:52.01	Lucas Rodrigues (BRA)	1:52.13
1500 metres	Eric Pomaski (ARG)	4:05.28	Cristofer Jarpa (CHI)	4:05.77	Alexandre Barbosa (BRA)	4:06.88
3000 metres	Thiago André (BRA)	8:34.47	Camilo Aguillon (COL)	8:43.04	Victor da Silva (BRA)	8:46.03
110 metres hurdles (wind: -2.6 m/s)	João Bento (BRA)	14.14	Francisco López (CHI)	14.42	Daniel da Silva (BRA)	14.54
400 metres hurdles	Wilson Bello (VEN)	52.62	Alejandro Díaz (VEN)	52.63	Rafael Mello (BRA)	52.63
2000 m steeplechase	Mateo Rossetto (ARG)	6:07.55	Felipe Rocha e Pinto (BRA)	6:11.98	Felipe Bastias (CHI)	6:15.41
High jump	Yohan Chaverra (COL)	2.10 CR	Thiago Moura (BRA)	2.07	Daniel Cortés (COL)	2.01
Pole vault	Matias Guerrero (CHI)	4.40	Leonardo dos Santos (BRA)	4.10	Nicolas Nascimento (BRA)	4.10
Long jump	Gabriel Constantino (BRA)	7.35 (wind: 0.2 m/s)	Álvaro Cortez (CHI)	7.32 (wind: 0.5 m/s)	Diego Hernández (VEN)	7.26 (wind: 1.5 m/s)
Triple jump	Mateus de Sá (BRA)	15.26 (wind: 0.7 m/s)	Álvaro Cortez (CHI)	15.03 (wind: 0.9 m/s)	Bruno de Souza (BRA)	14.73 (wind: 1.3 m/s)
Shot put	Félipe Leal (BRA)	18.23	Alesander Valencia (COL)	18.08	Rogerio de Sousa (BRA)	17.97
Discus throw	Giovanni Bonilla (CHI)	57.00	Félipe Leal (BRA)	56.83	Valdivino dos Santos (BRA)	53.18
Hammer throw	Joaquín Gómez (ARG)	81.15 CR	Humberto Mansilla (CHI)	66.61	Gabriel Kehr (CHI)	66.49
Javelin throw	Alesander Valencia (COL)	64.08	Welington Morais (BRA)	63.59	Santiago de la Fuente (CHI)	61.83
Octathlon	Jefferson Santos (BRA)	6141 CR	Andrés Sandoval (CHI)	5673	Alejandro Bregagnolo (ARG)	5526
10000 m race walk	Brayan Fuentes (COL)	47:05.21	Hiago Garcia (BRA)	47:41.73	Pablo Rodríguez (BOL)	49:19.56
1000m Medley relay (100m x 200m x 300m x 400m)	Brazil; Jonatan Rodrigues; Vitor dos Santos; Gabriel dos Santos; Rafael Peres	1:55.50	Venezuela; Diego Hernández; Yeiker Mendoza; Wilson Bello; Eudy Roberti	1:55.98	Chile; Camilo González; Francisco López; Rodrigo Mancilla; Nicolas Vironneau	1:57.29

=== Women ===
Event	Gold		Silver		Bronze	
100 metres (wind: -3.3 m/s)	Tamiris de Liz (BRA)	11.99	Ingrid Barros (BRA)	12.41	Noelia Martínez (ARG)	12.50
200 metres (wind: 1.8 m/s)	Letícia de Souza (BRA)	24.30	Noelia Martínez (ARG)	24.56	Valeria Baron (ARG)	24.94
400 metres	Melissa Torres (COL)	55.20	Diana Cruz (COL)	57.07	Ester Melo (BRA)	57.28
800 metres	Ana Silva (BRA)	2:12.60	Pia Fernández (URU)	2:13.64	Laura Martínez (COL)	2:14.22
1500 metres	Marguie Ryvera (COL)	4:37.58	Carolina Lozano (ARG)	4:43.33	Karen Olivera (PER)	4:44.55
3000 metres	Evelyn Escobar (PER)	10:09.88	Sunilda Lozano (PER)	10:14.14	Nathalia Ramalho (BRA)	10:18.75
100 metres hurdles (wind: -3.3 m/s)	Génesis Romero (VEN)	14.32	Laís Rodrigues (BRA)	14.61	Diana Bazalar (PER)	14.69
400 metres hurdles	Cardonna Briannill (VEN)	1:01.49	Taina Pantoja (BRA)	1:02.92	Nina Policarpo (BRA)	1:02.97
2000 m steeplechase	Zulema Arenas (PER)	6:40.28	Lucy Basilio (PER)	7:08.69	Thayna de Melo (BRA)	7:14.77
High jump	Ana de Oliveira (BRA)	1.76 CR	Lorena Aires (URU)	1.71	Fiorella Chiappe (ARG)	1.71
Pole vault	Noelina Madarieta (ARG)	3.65	Fernanda Carabias (CHI)	3.50	Juliana Campos (BRA)	3.45
Long jump	Gabriele dos Santos (BRA)	5.79 (wind: 0.4 m/s)	Aries Sánchez (VEN)	5.64 (wind: 0.5 m/s)	Alejandra Arévalo (PER)	5.62 (wind: 0.9 m/s)
Triple jump	Ingrid Lira (BRA)	12.54 (wind: -0.2 m/s)	Gabriele dos Santos (BRA)	12.51 (wind: 0.2 m/s)	Ariana Gutiérrez (VEN)	12.45 (wind: -2.2 m/s)
Shot put	Izabela da Silva (BRA)	16.82 CR	Micaela Aranda Rocío (ARG)	15.60	Jéssica Almeida (BRA)	14.71
Discus throw	Izabela da Silva (BRA)	47.19	Micaela Aranda Rocío (ARG)	46.70	Sofía Bausero (URU)	42.16
Hammer throw	Ana Vásquez (PER)	61.19 CR	Marcela Restrepo (COL)	55.03	Araceli Montivero (ARG)	54.48
Javelin throw	Laura Paredes (PAR)	45.81	Noelia Rodrigues (BRA)	44.59	Rubenglismar Figueroa (VEN)	44.05
Heptathlon	Leonela Graciani (ARG)	5090 CR	Kimberly Kuprewicz (ARG)	4836	Daiane Rohveder (BRA)	4444
5000 m race walk	Stefany Coronado (BOL)	25:16.33	Wendy Romero (COL)	26:13.87	Amanda Carvalho (BRA)	26:28.83
1000m Medley relay (100m x 200m x 300m x 400m)	Venezuela; Aries Sánchez; Jhoanmy Luque; Génesis Romero; Cardonna Briannill	2:13.12	Argentina; Aldana Pucharcos; Valeria Baron; Noelia Martínez; Fiorella Chiappe	2:13.95	Colombia; Anyi García; Diana Cruz; Tatiana Sánchez; Melissa Torres	2.15.03

== Medal table (unofficial) ==
* Host nation (Argentina)

Rank	Nation	Gold	Silver	Bronze	Total
1	Brazil	15	13	19	47
2	Colombia	6	5	3	14
3	Argentina*	5	6	6	17
4	Venezuela	4	5	3	12
5	Peru	3	2	3	8
6	Chile	2	7	4	13
7	Panama	2	0	0	2
8	Uruguay	1	2	1	4
9	Bolivia	1	0	1	2
10	Paraguay	1	0	0	1
Totals (10 entries)		40	40	40	120

== Team trophies ==
The placing tables for team trophy (overall team, men and women categories) were published.

=== Total ===
The host country is highlighted in lavender blue

Rank	Nation	Points
1st place, gold medalist(s)	Brazil	372
2nd place, silver medalist(s)	Argentina	184.5
3rd place, bronze medalist(s)	Chile	158
4	Colombia	125
5	Venezuela	121.5
6	(Peru) Perú	82.5
7	Uruguay	40
8	(Panama) Panamá	23
9	Bolivia	19
10	Paraguay	11

=== Male ===
The host country is highlighted in lavender blue

Rank	Nation	Points
1st place, gold medalist(s)	Brazil	195
2nd place, silver medalist(s)	Chile	115
3rd place, bronze medalist(s)	Argentina	77.5
4	Colombia	66
5	Venezuela	58.5
6	(Panama) Panamá	21
7	Uruguay	16
8	(Peru) Perú	12.5
9	Bolivia	6
10	Paraguay	1

=== Female ===
The host country is highlighted in lavender blue

Rank	Nation	Points
1st place, gold medalist(s)	Brazil	177
2nd place, silver medalist(s)	Argentina	107
3rd place, bronze medalist(s)	(Peru) Perú	70
4	Venezuela	63
5	Colombia	59
6	Chile	43
7	Uruguay	24
8	Bolivia	13
9	Paraguay	10
10	(Panama) Panamá	2

== Participation (unofficial) ==
Different numbers were published. One source announces 317 athletes from 11 countries including 1 athlete from Costa Rica invited as guest nation. Working through the results, an unofficial count yields the number of about 308 athletes (including 1 athlete from Costa Rica as guest) in the start list. Following, the numbers in brackets refer to (athletes in published team roster/athletes in start list):

- Argentina (65/61)
- Bolivia (9)
- Brazil (69)
- Chile (60/59)
- Colombia (21)
- (Panama) Panamá (7)
- Paraguay (5)
- (Peru) Perú (29)
- Uruguay (31/27)
- Venezuela (20)
- Costa Rica (1) Guest nation
