= 2021 South American U18 Championships in Athletics =

XXV South American U18 Championships in Athletics
- Dates: 25 – 26 September
- Host city: Encarnación (Paraguay)
- Venue: Estadio Comunal
- Level: Youth
- Events: 39
- Participation: 360 athletes from 12 nations
- Records set: 2 CRs

The 25th South American U18 Championships in Athletics were held in Encarnación, Paraguay, on 25 and 26 September 2021.

== Medal summary ==
=== Boys ===
Event	Gold		Silver		Bronze	
100 metres -1.3 m/s	Tomás Mondino; Argentina	10.59	Renan Gallina; Brazil	10.65	Enzo Barros; Brazil	10.93
200 metres -1.1 m/s	Tomás Mondino; Argentina	21.94	Jhumiler Sánchez; Paraguay	22.14	Juan Carlos Anaya; Colombia	22.28
400 metres	Vinícius Galeno; Brazil	48.73	Gabriel Tasca; Brazil	48.78	Hector Broncano; Ecuador	49.49
800 metres	Gabriel dos Santos; Brazil	1:51.24	Pedro Marín; Colombia	1:53.00	Samuel Guarín; Colombia	1:53.12
1500 metres	Gonzalo Gervasini; Uruguay	3:57.03	David Preciado; Colombia	4:02.65	Sebastián Dossow; Chile	4:06.89
3000 metres	Alexander García; Colombia	8:41.08	Carlos Peñafiel; Ecuador	8:42.99	Nider Pecho; Peru	8:44.57
110 metres hurdles (91.4 cm) -1.2 m/s	Thiago dos Santos; Brazil	13.97	Gustavo Cadan; Brazil	14.27	Pedro Morales; Chile	14.60
400 metres hurdles (84 cm)	Leonardo Mendes; Brazil	53.41	Javier Valentino Molet; Argentina	53.89	Samuel dos Santos; Brazil	54.08
2000 m steeplechase	Wilson Navarrete; Ecuador	5:58.61	Jeronimo Peralta; Argentina	6:04.31	Bruno do Prado; Brazil	6:05.95
4 × 100 metres relay	Brazil; Renan Gallina; Enzo Barros; Thamer Villar; Eron de Araújo	41.41	Argentina; Ignacio Cabrera; Luis Batista; Matías Castro; Tomás Mondino	41.56	Peru; Rodrigo Cornejo; Aron Eart; Ismael Arevalo; Luis Humberto Angulo	41.78
10,000 m track walk	Miguel Peña; Colombia	45:27.90	Julián Alfonso; Colombia	45:46.03	João Victor Magalhães; Brazil	46:23.22
High jump	Cristobal Sahurie; Chile	2.04	Eron de Araújo; Brazil	1.95	Brayan Ganan; Ecuador	1.95
Pole vault	Aurelio Leite; Brazil	4.60	Ricardo Montes de Oca; Venezuela	4.60	Pedro Henrique Aparecido; Brazil	4.30
Long jump	Matheus de Barros; Brazil	7.30	Ezequiel Sferra; Argentina	6.96	Jean Mosquera; Colombia	6.85
Triple jump	Vinícius de Freitas; Brazil	14.67	Jarley Cuellar; Brazil	14.58	Roy Chila; Ecuador	14.50
Shot put (5 kg)	Darwin Meneses; Colombia	17.90	Juan Anding; Brazil	17.39	Javier Montejo; Argentina	16.22
Discus throw (1.5 kg)	Hollman Villamizar; Colombia	54.13	Matheus de Barros; Brazil	52.76	Juan Anding; Brazil	52.49
Hammer throw (5 kg)	Tomás Olivera; Argentina	70.31	Jean Carlos Ortíz; Colombia	69.45	Cipriano Riquelme; Chile	66.99
Javelin throw (700 kg)	Pablo Joan Frutos; Chile	65.52	Arthur Curvo; Brazil	63.92	Yuri Benites; Brazil	61.52
Decathlon (U18)	Luiz Arthur Santos; Brazil	6342	Vitor Lazarim; Brazil	6244	Alejandro Romano; Argentina	5919

=== Girls ===
Event	Gold		Silver		Bronze	
100 metres -1.0 m/s	Laura Martínez; Colombia	11.92	Melany Bolaño; Colombia	12.00	Suellen de Santanna; Brazil	12.17
200 metres -1.4 m/s	Melany Bolaño; Colombia	24.73	Marlet Ospino; Colombia	25.21	Suellen de Santanna; Brazil	25.30
400 metres	Martina Bonaudi; Uruguay	57.39	Ana Luiza dos Santos; Brazil	57.73	Paola Loboa; Colombia	57.79
800 metres	Anita Poma; Peru	2:11.75	Caroline Gomes; Brazil	2:13.64	Julia Gonçalves; Brazil	2:14.06
1500 metres	Danna Michel Pinchao; Colombia	4:44.58	Ana Valerio; Brazil	4:47.04	Stefany Ribeiro; Brazil	4:50.10
3000 metres	Gabriela Tardivo; Brazil	10:02.39	Lilian Mateo; Bolivia	10:14.62	Vanessa Alder; Ecuador	10:22.91
100 metres hurdles (76.2 cm) -1.5 m/s	María Alejandra Murillo; Colombia	13.66 CR	Lays Silva; Brazil	14.08	Catalina Rozas; Chile	14.23
400 metres hurdles	Letícia de Oliveira; Brazil	59.33 CR	María Alejandra Murillo; Colombia	59.55	Camille de Oliveira; Brazil	61.16
2000 m steeplechase	Eunice Lescano; Argentina	7:19.63	Amanda Silva; Brazil	7:27.60	Jomayra Tite; Ecuador	7:28.49
4 × 100 metres relay	Colombia; Laura Martínez; Melany Bolaño; María Alejandra Murillo; Marlet Ospino	46.18	Brazil; Tainara Mees; Suellen de Santanna; Nicole Domene; Isadora Sorriano	46.61	Argentina; Victoria Zanolli; Helen Bernard; Valentina Napolitano; Malena Gobbo	48.06
5000 m track walk	Natalia Pulido; Colombia	23:16.00	Sara Encalada; Ecuador	23:49.23	Mariana Rincón; Colombia	24:23.86
High jump	Silvina Gil; Uruguay	1.72	Gabriela de Sá; Brazil	1.72	Joaquina Dura; Argentina	1.63
Pole vault	Asunción Dreyfus; Chile	3.60	Julia Calabretti; Brazil	3.60	Iraynelli Bravo; Venezuela	3.55
Long jump	Vanessa dos Santos; Brazil	6.15 (w)	Nerly Cantoni; Colombia	6.14	Ornelys Ortiz; Venezuela	5.86 (w)
Triple jump	Joaquina Dura; Argentina	12.52	Beatriz dos Santos; Brazil	12.37	Katerine Pinillo; Colombia	12.35
Shot put (3 kg)	Taniele da Silva; Brazil	14.64	Alison Torres; Ecuador	14.30	Laira Ordoñez; Colombia	13.76
Discus throw	Florencia Dupans; Argentina	43.86	Valentina Ulloa; Chile	43.15	Maria Eduarda de Matos; Brazil	41.45
Hammer throw (3 kg)	Catalina Rodríguez; Colombia	61.89	Katerine Tantalean; Peru	56.89	Sara Antonia Vera; Chile	55.30
Javelin throw (500 g)	Manuela Rotundo; Uruguay	47.15	Martina Prieto; Argentina	43.29	Laura Ordoñez; Colombia	43.01
Heptathlon (U18)	Renata Godoy; Argentina	4983	Sofhia Antonio; Brazil	4882	María Paula Reinoso; Colombia	4591

=== Mixed ===
Event	Gold		Silver		Bronze	
8 × 300 metres relay	Brazil; Ana Luiza dos Santos (W); Letícia de Oliveira (W); Nicole Domene (W); Camille de Oliveira (W); Vinícius Galeno (M); Gabriel Tasca (M); Samuel dos Santos (M); Leonardo Mendes (M)	5:01.86	Ecuador; Ignacio Cabrera (M); Mateo Duran (M); Joaquina Dura (W); Malena Gobbo (W); Helen Bernard (W); Abril Molina (W); Luis Batista (M); Tomás Mondino (M)	5:07.17	Colombia; Samuel Guarín (M); Paola Loboa (W); Freddy Jiménez (M); Juan Carlos Anaya (M); Raúl Ararat (M); Marlet Ospino (W); Melany Bolaño (W); Laura Martínez (W)	5:16.39

== Medal table ==
Rank	Nation	Gold	Silver	Bronze	Total
1	Brazil (BRA)	15	19	13	47
2	Colombia (COL)	11	8	11	30
3	Argentina (ARG)	7	7	5	19
4	Uruguay (URU)	4	0	0	4
5	Chile (CHI)	3	1	5	9
6	Ecuador (ECU)	1	3	5	9
7	Peru (PER)	1	1	2	4
8	Venezuela (VEN)	0	1	2	3
9	Bolivia (BOL)	0	1	0	1
9	Paraguay (PAR)	0	1	0	1
Totals (10 entries)		42	42	43	127
