= Lucas Vilar =

Brazilian sprinter (born 2001)

Personal information
- Full name: Lucas Conceição Vilar
- Born: 10 March 2001 (age 25) Limeira, Brazil

Sport
- Country: Brazil
- Sport: Athletics
- Event: 200 metres
- Club: SESI - SP
Medal record
Men's athletics
Representing Brazil
Pan American Games
Gold medal – first place	2023 Santiago	400 m
Gold medal – first place	2023 Santiago	4×400 m relay
Silver medal – second place	2023 Santiago	4×400 m relay mixed
South American Championships
Silver medal – second place	2021 Guayaquil	200 m
Youth Olympic Games
Bronze medal – third place	2018 Buenos Aires	200 m
South American U20 Championships
Gold medal – first place	2019 Cali	200 m
Gold medal – first place	2019 Cali	4×100 m relay
South American U18 Championships
Gold medal – first place	2018 Cuenca	200 m
Gold medal – first place	2018 Cuenca	4×100 m relay
Silver medal – second place	2018 Cuenca	400 m

Lucas Conceição Vilar (born 10 March 2001) is a Brazilian sprinter competing primarily in the 200 metres. He competed in the 200 metres at the 2020 Summer Olympics.

== Personal bests ==
Outdoor

- 100 metres – 10.32 (Brasília 2023)
- 200 metres – 20.57 (Cali 2021)
- 400 metres – 45.38 (Bragança Paulista 2023)
