= 2022 South American U18 Championships in Athletics =

XXVI South American U18 Championships in Athletics
- Dates: 9 – 11 September
- Host city: São Paulo, Brazil
- Venue: Pista de Atletismo do Centro Olímpico de Treinamento de Pesquisa
- Level: U18
- Events: 39

The 26th South American U18 Championships in Athletics were held in São Paulo, Brazil, on 9, 10 and 11 September 2022.

== Medal summary ==
=== Boys ===
Event	Gold		Silver		Bronze	
100 metres +0.6 m/s	Tomás Mondino; Argentina	10.51	Adrian Nicolari; Uruguay	10.63	Aron Earl; Peru	10.64
200 metres -1.0 m/s	Tomás Mondino; Argentina	21.33	Ezekiel Newton; Guyana	21.45	Benjamin Aravena; Chile	21.65
400 metres	Vinícius Galeno; Brazil	47.41	Tainan Zart; Brazil	49.05	Ignacio Cabrera; Argentina	49.40
800 metres	Klaus Scholz; Chile	1:52.64	Vinícius Costa; Brazil	1:52.91	Bryan Alves; Brazil	1:54.04
1500 metres	Gonzalo Gervasini; Uruguay	3:53.72 CR	Uriel Muñoz; Argentina	3:54.95	Héctor Gómez; Venezuela	3:56.56
3000 metres	Luis Chávez; Peru	8:38.09	Luis Huaman; Peru	8:42.51	Oliver Díaz; Venezuela	8:43.21
110 metres hurdles (91.4 cm) +0.9 m/s	Paulo Henrique da Silva; Brazil	13.71	Vinícius de Brito; Brazil	13.78	Fabrizio Jara; Paraguay	13.83
400 metres hurdles (84 cm)	Ian Andrey Pata; Ecuador	52.84	Héctor Barrios; Colombia	54.18	Agustín Coronel; Argentina	54.33
2000 m steeplechase	Edgar Huillca; Peru	5:58.97	Deangelo Cadima; Bolivia	6:04.85	Paul Torres; Colombia	6:04.86
4 × 100 metres relay	Ecuador; Yehdhah Rodríguez; Ian Andrey Pata; Joe Caicedo; Roy Chila	42.19	Brazil; Ariel Ribeiro; Paulo Henrique da Silva; Hyago de Araujo; Thiago da Silva	42.27	Paraguay; Elías Giménez; Fabrizio Jara; Oscar Gill; Alan Dopke	43.93
10,000 m track walk	Julián Alfonso; Colombia	46:26.75	Emanuel Apaza; Peru	47:05.67	Klaubert de Franca; Brazil	49:28.89
High jump	Héctor Añez; Venezuela	1.96	Gabriel Borges; Brazil	1.93	Eric Cardoso; Brazil	1.93
Pole vault	Agustín Carril; Argentina	4.55	Pedro Henrique Aparecido; Brazil	4.55	Leonardo Olate; Chile	4.40
Long jump	Alexander Villalba; Paraguay	6.95	Renan Akamine; Brazil	6.91	Roy Chila; Ecuador	6.88
Triple jump	Roy Chila; Ecuador	15.04	Gilvan da Costa; Brazil	14.71	Santiago Theran; Colombia	14.27
Shot put (5 kg)	Alberto dos Santos Filho; Brazil	17.78	Alessandro Soares; Brazil	17.19	Erik Caicedo; Ecuador	17.08
Discus throw (1.5 kg)	Juan David Montaño; Colombia	60.84	Alan Fell; Chile	57.64	Alberto dos Santos Filho; Brazil	56.19
Hammer throw (5 kg)	Cipriano Riquelme; Chile	69.07	Luis Felipe Barbosa; Brazil	65.93	Juan Sebastián Scarpetta; Colombia	64.88
Javelin throw (700 kg)	Arthur Curvo; Brazil	72.17	Pablo Frutos; Chile	66.25	Kevin Machado; Uruguay	55.87
Decathlon (U18)	Facundo Millan; Chile	6333	Igor de Jesus; Brazil	5921	Lucas Rojas; Bolivia	5821

=== Girls ===
Event	Gold		Silver		Bronze	
100 metres 0.0 m/s	Vanessa dos Santos; Brazil	11.56	Natalia Campregher; Brazil	11.96	Natalia Duarte; Colombia	12.03
200 metres -0.4 m/s	Genesis Cañola; Ecuador	24.58	Natalia Duarte; Colombia	24.68	Antonia Ramírez; Chile	25.01
400 metres	Julia Ribeiro; Brazil	54.17	Ibeyis Romero; Venezuela	55.66	Genesis Cañola; Ecuador	56.00
800 metres	Juana Zuberbuhler; Argentina	2:12.81	Raymari Alvornoz; Venezuela	2:13.44	Pamela Barreto; Ecuador	2:13.49
1500 metres	Vanessa Alder; Ecuador	4:39.44	Pamela Barreto; Ecuador	4:41.02	Lilian Mateo; Bolivia	4:41.79
3000 metres	Vanessa Alder; Ecuador	10:05.43	Lilian Mateo; Bolivia	10:06.77	Dayana Flores; Peru	10:10.03
100 metres hurdles (76.2 cm) +1.3 m/s	Catalina Rozas; Chile	13.65	Helen Bernard; Argentina	13.79	Natalia Campregher; Brazil	14.19
400 metres hurdles	Amanda da Silva; Brazil	60.97	Maria Chagas; Brazil	62.13	Helen Bernard; Argentina	62.67
2000 m steeplechase	Russell Cjuro; Peru	7:18.72	Yoselyn Limanche; Peru	7:23.63	Juliany da Costa; Brazil	7:33.96
4 × 100 metres relay	Brazil; Amanda da Silva; Maria Fernanda Rosa; Vitoria da Silva; Natalia Campregher	47.25	Chile; Asunción Dreyfus; Dominga Philipps; Catalina Rozas; Antonia Ramírez	47.68	Argentina; Denise Vega; Helen Bernard; Victoria Zanolli; Camila Rodríguez	48.92
5000 m track walk	Ruby Segura; Colombia	24:04.03	Karen Litardo; Ecuador	24:49.03	Yadira Orihuela; Peru	25:52.49
High jump	Maria Eduarda de Oliveira; Brazil	1.75	Luisa Lopes; Brazil	1.73	Valeria George; Colombia	1.65
Pole vault	Carolina Scarponi; Argentina	3.80	Julia Calabretti; Brazil	3.50	Asunción Dreyfus; Chile	3.40
Long jump	Vanessa dos Santos; Brazil	6.39 CR	Nayza Donanzan; Brazil	5.85	Victoria Zanolli; Argentina	5.78
Triple jump	Valery Arce; Colombia	12.30	Joaquina Dura; Argentina	12.19	Maria Eduarda de Oliveira; Brazil	11.74
Shot put (3 kg)	Belsy Quiñónez; Ecuador	14.85	Samanta Lopes; Brazil	14.21	Marisa González; Argentina	13.91
Discus throw	Camila Flach; Brazil	42.88	Selene Olivieri; Argentina	41.46	Samanta Lopes; Brazil	40.13
Hammer throw (3 kg)	Giuliana Baigorria; Argentina	63.58	Yenniver Veroes; Venezuela	61.99	Kimberly Assiz; Brazil	58.68
Javelin throw (500 g)	Anelis Korniejczuk; Argentina	45.40	Anahí Sánchez; Ecuador	43.32	Isabela Dantas; Brazil	41.92
Heptathlon (U18)	Renata Godoy; Argentina	5328	Yudisa Martínez; Colombia	4943	Isabela Teixeira; Brazil	4687

=== Mixed ===
Event	Gold		Silver		Bronze	
8 × 300 metres relay	Brazil; Amanda da Silva; Maria Eduarda Chagas; Letícia Lopes; Julia Ribeiro; Ruan Souza; Tainan Zart; Vinícius de Brito; Vinícius Galeno	5:01.74	Argentina; Juana Zuberbuhler; Renata Godoy; Angela Almada; Helen Bernard; Agustín Coronel; Ignacio Cabrera; Matías Castro; Nicolas Patiño	5:05.98	Chile; Karla Pulgar; Antonia Ramírez; Dominga Philipps; Catalina Rozas; Benjamin Aravena; Facundo Milan; Klaus Scholz; Tomas Godoy	5:07.40

== Medal table ==
* Host nation (Brazil)

Rank	Nation	Gold	Silver	Bronze	Total
1	Brazil (BRA)*	13	17	11	41
2	Argentina (ARG)	8	6	6	20
3	Ecuador (ECU)	7	3	4	14
4	Chile (CHI)	4	3	6	13
5	Colombia (COL)	4	3	5	12
6	Peru (PER)	3	3	3	9
7	Venezuela (VEN)	1	3	2	6
8	Uruguay (URU)	1	1	1	3
9	Paraguay (PAR)	1	0	2	3
10	Bolivia (BOL)	0	2	2	4
Totals (10 entries)		42	41	42	125
