= 2014 South American Youth Championships in Athletics =

XXII South American Youth Championships in Athletics
- Dates: November 28–30
- Host city: Cali, Colombia
- Venue: Estadio Olímpico Pascual Guerrero, Estadio Pedro Grajales
- Level: Youth
- Events: 39
- Participation: 337 + 77 guest athletes from 12 + 9 guest nations
- Records set: 13

The 22nd South American Youth Championships in Athletics were held in Cali, Colombia from November 28–30, 2014. The event was held jointly with the I Central American Youth Grand Prix (I Grand Prix Centroamericano Youth). The majority of events took place at Estadio Olímpico Pascual Guerrero, whereas throwing events were held at Estadio Pedro Grajales.

A detailed report and an appraisal of the results was given.

== Medal summary ==
Complete results were published.

=== Boys ===
Event	Gold		Silver		Bronze	
100 metres (wind: +0.3 m/s)	Jhonny Rentería; Colombia	10.61	Arturo Deliser; Panama	10.66	Jerson Viáfara; Colombia	10.84
200 metres (wind: 0.0 m/s)	Arturo Deliser; Panama	21.11 CR	Aliffer dos Santos; Brazil	21.30	Enzo Faulbaum; Chile	21.49
400 metres	Jason Yaw; Guyana	46.79 CR	Maykon do Nascimento; Brazil	47.40	Martín Tagle; Chile	47.67
800 metres	Luiz Fernando Pires; Brazil	1:55.68	Jean Jácome; Ecuador	1:55.70	Cristian Castro; Peru	1:56.04
1500 metres^{1}	Rodrigo Valerio Silva; Brazil	3:59.17	Lucas da Silva; Brazil	4:00.29	Sebastián Cubides; Colombia	4:00.62
3000 metres	Daniel do Nascimento; Brazil	8:30.85 CR	Francisco Albarracín; Colombia	8:46.80	Hugo Catrileo; Chile	8:47.65
2000 metres steeplechase	Diego Arévalo; Ecuador	6:01.67	Nicolas da Silva; Brazil	6:06.12	Martín Oyarzo; Chile	6:07.93
110 metres hurdles (wind: +1.8 m/s)	Diego Delmónaco; Chile	13.55 CR	Joshuan Berríos; Colombia	13.59	Iago da Cunha; Brazil	13.70
400 metres hurdles	Mikael de Jesus; Brazil	51.77	Fanor Escobar; Colombia	53.10	Iago da Cunha; Brazil	53.17
10,000 metres track walk	César Rodríguez; Peru	42:39.06	Pablo Armando Rodríguez; Bolivia	44:57.00	César Herrera; Colombia	45:50.41
High jump	Danilo Cardoso; Brazil	2.09	Jeaiver Moreno; Venezuela	2.06	Jaime Escobar; Panama	2.00
Pole vault	Bruno Spinelli; Brazil	5.00	Martín Castañares; Uruguay	4.45	Carlos Amaya; Colombia	4.30
Long jump	Anderson dos Reis; Brazil	7.25 (wind: +0.3 m/s)	Lucas de Souza; Brazil	7.23 (wind: +0.3 m/s)	Rafael Insuaste; Ecuador	7.11 (wind: 0.0 m/s)
Triple jump^{2}	Vitor Centeno; Brazil	15.03 (wind: +0.3 m/s)	Allison Pereira; Brazil	14.84 (wind: +0.1 m/s)	Diego Delmónaco; Chile	14.61 (wind: +1.4 m/s)
Shot put	Josiel de Sousa; Brazil	17.67	Julián Pereira; Argentina	17.67	Luis Córdoba; Colombia	16.94
Discus throw	José Miguel Ballivian; Chile	53.94	Cleverson Oliveira; Brazil	53.74	Josiel de Sousa; Brazil	50.68
Hammer throw^{3}	Xavier Colmenares; Venezuela	69.37	Jair Pacentchux Júnior; Brazil	68.03	Roberto Montiel; Chile	67.91
Javelin throw	Pedro Barros; Brazil	68.82	Felipe Bascuñán; Chile	63.06	Pedro Henrique Rodrigues; Brazil	60.34
Decathlon	Andy Preciado; Ecuador	7007 CR	Sergio Pandiani; Argentina	6399	Rafael Pereira; Brazil	6303

^{1}: In the 1500m event, Carlos Hernández from Colombia tied for the 3rd place in 4:00.62 competing as guest.
^{2}: In triple jump, Cristian Atanay from Cuba was 1st in 15.38 m (+0.7 m/s) competing as guest.
^{3}: In hammer throw, Miguel Zamora from Cuba was 2nd throwing 68.94 m competing as guest.

=== Girls ===
Event	Gold		Silver		Bronze	
100 metres (wind: +0.2 m/s)	Evelyn Rivera; Colombia	11.72	Isabela Silva; Brazil	11.75	Maribel Caicedo; Ecuador	12.04
200 metres (wind: +1.0 m/s)	Evelyn Rivera; Colombia	23.93 CR	Kelly Barona; Ecuador	24.29	Daysiellen Dias; Brazil	24.77
400 metres	Jimena Copara; Peru	54.83	Natricia Hooper; Guyana	55.06	Eliana Chávez; Colombia	55.30
800 metres	Johana Arrieta; Colombia	2:10.64	Ana Karolyne Silva; Brazil	2:11.35	Valentina Barrientos; Chile	2:12.20
1500 metres	Valeria Cornejo; Ecuador	4:41.94	Micaela Levaggi; Argentina	4:44.61	Ruth Basilio; Peru	4:46.56
3000 metres	Ruth Cjuro; Peru	10:01.73	Martha Guerrero; Colombia	10:01.79	Clara Baiocchi; Argentina	10:13.04
2000 metres steeplechase^{4}	Luz Karen Olivera; Peru	7:12.85	Rina Cjuro; Peru	7:14.49	Agustina Boucherie; Argentina	7:18.15
100 metres hurdles (wind: +1.3 m/s)	Maribel Caicedo; Ecuador	13.49 CR	Clara Marín; Chile	13.61	Steffi Murillo; Peru	13.81
400 metres hurdles	Clara Marín; Chile	1:01.21	Ana Yenifer Cedeño; Venezuela	1:01.60	Josselyn Montiel; Ecuador	1:01.64
5000 metres track walk	Karla Jaramillo; Ecuador	23:38.83	María Fernanda Montoya; Colombia	23:47.70	Leydi Guerra; Peru	23:55.61
High jump	María Fernanda Murillo; Colombia	1.78 CR	Camila Arrieta; Chile	1.78 CR	Catalina Ossa; Chile	1.72
Pole vault	Robeilys Peinado; Venezuela	4.00 CR	Paula Arellano; Colombia	3.40	Carolina Guzmán; Chile	3.30
Long jump	Leticia Melo; Brazil	6.13 (wind: +0.1 m/s) CR	Alexa Morey; Peru	6.07 (wind: +0.1 m/s)	Antonia Kummerlin; Chile	5.90 (wind: +0.5 m/s)
Triple jump	Nhayilla Rentería; Colombia	12.94 (wind: +0.5 m/s)	Valeria Quispe; Bolivia	12.58 (wind: +0.2 m/s)	Beatriz Diogo; Brazil	12.41 (wind: +0.3 m/s)
Shot put	Ginger Quintero; Ecuador	15.68	Amanda Scherer; Brazil	15.54	Dayna Toledo; Chile	14.71
Discus throw	Ailén Armada; Argentina	42.60	Elizabeth Mina; Ecuador	41.92	Catalina Bravo; Chile	41.74
Hammer throw	Mayra Gaviria; Colombia	64.94 CR	Elizabeth Mina; Ecuador	63.61	Ana Bayer; Brazil	60.86
Javelin throw	Estefany Chacón; Venezuela	51.87 CR	Joana Soares; Brazil	47.57	Ana Carolina Pires; Brazil	47.24
Heptathlon	Jennifer Canchingre; Ecuador	5059	Letícia Sumocoski da Silva; Brazil	4880	Joyce Micolta; Ecuador	4813

^{4}: In 2000m steeplechase, María Paula Guerrero from Colombia was 2nd in 7:13.38 competing as guest.

=== Mixed ===
Event	Gold		Silver		Bronze	
Mixed 4 × 400 metres relay	Brazil; Stephanie Guimarães; Anderson Cerqueira; Daysiellen Dias; Maykon do Nascimento	3:27.02 CR	Colombia; Johana Arrieta; Eliana Chávez; Rodrigo Lagares; Anthony Zambrano	3:28.53	Chile; Mónica Mendoza; Enzo Faulbaum; Clara Marín; Martín Tagle	3:32.13

== Medal table ==
The unofficial medal count is in agreement with an official publication.

* Host nation (Colombia)

Rank	Nation	Gold	Silver	Bronze	Total
1	Brazil	12	13	9	34
2	Colombia*	7	7	6	20
3	Ecuador	7	4	4	15
4	Peru	4	2	4	10
5	Chile	3	3	13	19
6	Venezuela	3	2	0	5
7	Argentina	1	3	2	6
8	Panama	1	1	1	3
9	Guyana	1	1	0	2
10	Bolivia	0	2	0	2
11	Uruguay	0	1	0	1
Totals (11 entries)		39	39	39	117

== Participation ==
According to an unofficial count, 337 athletes from 12 countries participated.

- Argentina (17)
- Bolivia (14)
- Brazil (69)
- Chile (39)
- Colombia (66)
- Ecuador (37)
- Guyana (3)
- Panama (9)
- Paraguay (15)
- Peru (33)
- Uruguay (15)
- Venezuela (20)

In addition, 77 athletes participated in the Central American Youth Grand Prix, 35 athletes in 12 international teams:

- (Caribbean Netherlands) /Bonaire (2)
- British Virgin Islands (1)
- Cayman Islands (1)
- Colombia (18)
- Costa Rica (1)
- Cuba (5)
- El Salvador (1)
- Honduras (2)
- Nicaragua (1)
- Paraguay (1)
- Peru (1)
- Puerto Rico (1)

and 42 athletes in 9 local teams from Colombian departments:

- Bogotá (3)
- Boyacá (3)
- Cauca (2)
- Cundinamarca (3)
- Quindío (2)
- Risaralda (9)
- San Andrés y Providencia (4)
- Santander (1)
- Valle del Cauca (15)

== Team trophies ==
Brazil won the team trophies in two categories, overall and boys, while Colombia won the girls category.

=== Total ===
The host country is highlighted in lavender blue

Rank	Nation	Points
1st place, gold medalist(s)	Brazil	303
2nd place, silver medalist(s)	Colombia	195
3rd place, bronze medalist(s)	Ecuador	157
4	Chile	132
5	Peru	93
6	Venezuela	61
7	Argentina	59
8	Panama	23
9	Guyana	16
10	Uruguay	14
11	Bolivia	13
12	Paraguay	7

=== Boys ===
The host country is highlighted in lavender blue

Rank	Nation	Points
1st place, gold medalist(s)	Brazil	206
2nd place, silver medalist(s)	Colombia	88
3rd place, bronze medalist(s)	Chile	67
4	Ecuador	55
5	Venezuela	29
6	Argentina	26
7	Peru	24
8	Panama	20
9	Guyana	10
9	Uruguay	10
11	Bolivia	7
12	Paraguay	3

=== Girls ===
The host country is highlighted in lavender blue

Rank	Nation	Points
1st place, gold medalist(s)	Colombia	107
2nd place, silver medalist(s)	Ecuador	102
3rd place, bronze medalist(s)	Brazil	97
4	Peru	69
5	Chile	65
6	Argentina	33
7	Venezuela	32
8	Bolivia	6
8	Guyana	6
10	Paraguay	4
10	Uruguay	4
12	Panama	3
