= South American U18 Championships in Athletics =

Biennial athletics event

The South American U18 Championships in Athletics (Campeonato Sudamericano U18 de atletismo) is a biennial athletics event organized by "Confederación Sudamericana de Atletismo" (CONSUDATLE), the South American area association of the World Athletics (IAAF). Starting in 1973, the competition was open for athletes under-17 in the early years. Since 2000 the international age group definition (under 18) has applied. Up until the 2016 edition the competition was known as the South American Youth Championships in Athletics. The tournament is open for athletes from CONSUDATLE member federations. Athletes from IAAF members of other geographical areas may be invited. However, they are not considered in the classification.

== Events ==
Each member federation is allowed to enter 2 athletes and 1 relay team per event. Due to the latest edition of article 27 of the regulations of CONSUDATLE the following events are held during the championships:

=== Boys ===
- Dash: 100m, 200m, 400m, 800m, 1500m, 3000m
- Hurdling: 110m (height: 0.914 m), 400m (height: 0.84 m)
- Steeplechase: 2000m
- Relay: 1000m Medley relay (100m x 200m x 300m x 400m)
- Racewalking: 10,000m
- Throw: Shot put (5 kg), Discus (1.5 kg), Hammer (5 kg), Javelin (700 g)
- Jump: High jump, Long jump, Triple jump, Pole vault
- Combined: Octathlon (100m, Long jump, Shot put, 400m, 110m hurdles, High jump, Javelin, 1000m).

=== Girls ===
Starting in 2012, there were new implements for the throws (and consequently in heptathlon):

- Dash: 100m, 200m, 400m, 800m, 1500m, 3000m
- Hurdling: 100m (height: 0.762 m), 400m (height: 0.762 m)
- Steeplechase: 2000m
- Relay: 1000m Medley relay (100m x 200m x 300m x 400m)
- Racewalking: 5000m
- Throw: Shot put (3 kg; (until 2011: 4 kg)), Discus (1 kg), Hammer (3 kg; (until 2011: 4 kg)), Javelin (500 g; (until 2011: 600 g))
- Jump: High jump, Long jump, Triple jump, Pole vault
- Combined: Heptathlon (100m hurdles, High jump, Shot put, 200m, Long jump, Javelin, 800m).

== Awards ==
Medals are awarded for individuals and relay team members for the first three places in each event.

Trophies are awarded to teams in each category (male and female) with the highest total number of cumulative points in the entire competition. In addition, a trophy will be given to the country for the overall title.

A trophy is also presented to both a male and a female athlete for the most outstanding performance.

== Summary of championships ==
	Year	City	Country	Date	Venue
1	1973	Comodoro Rivadavia	Argentina	2–4 November	
2	1975	Quito	Ecuador	8–11 November	Estadio Atahualpa
3	1976	Santiago	Chile	4–7 November	
4	1977	Rio de Janeiro	Brazil	22–24 July	
5	1978	Montevideo	Uruguay	11–13 November	
6	1979	Cochabamba	Bolivia	3–5 August	
7	1984	Tarija	Bolivia	13–16 September	
8	1986	Comodoro Rivadavia	Argentina	17–19 October	
9	1988	Cuenca	Ecuador	2–4 November	
10	1990	Lima	Peru	22–24 November	
11	1992	Santiago	Chile	2–4 October	
12	1994	Cochabamba	Bolivia	30 September – 2 October	
13	1996	Asunción	Paraguay	18–20 October	
14	1998	Manaus	Brazil	23–25 October	
15	2000	Bogotá	Colombia	4–5 November	El Salitre
16	2002	Asunción	Paraguay	19–20 October	Consejo Nacional de Deportes
17	2004	Guayaquil	Ecuador	25–26 September	Estadio Modelo
18	2006	Caracas	Venezuela	14–15 October	Estadio Nacional “Brígido Iriarte”
19	2008	Lima	Peru	29–30 November	Villa Deportiva Nacional (VIDENA)
20	2010	Santiago	Chile	9–10 October	Estadio Nacional Julio Martínez Prádanos
21	2012	Mendoza	Argentina	27–28 October	Parque San Martín
22	2014	Cali	Colombia	29–30 November	Estadio Olímpico Pascual Guerrero
23	2016	Concordia	Argentina	12–13 November	Centro de Desarrollo Deportivo
24	2018	Cuenca	Ecuador	30 June–1 July	Jefferson Pérez Stadium
25	2021	Encarnación	Paraguay	25–26 September	Estadio Comunal
26	2022	São Paulo	Brazil	9–11 September	Centro Olímpico de Treinamento e Pesquisa
27	2024	San Luis	Argentina	6–8 December	Centro de Desarrollo Deportivo Pedro Presti
28	2026	Cuenca	Ecuador	11–13 December	Jefferson Pérez Stadium

== Medal table(1973-2024) ==
Rank	Nation	Gold	Silver	Bronze	Total
1	Brazil (BRA)	441	379	282	1,102
2	Argentina (ARG)	185	171	172	528
3	Chile (CHI)	92	133	170	395
4	Colombia (COL)	91	106	119	316
5	Ecuador (ECU)	79	60	69	208
6	Venezuela (VEN)	63	70	81	214
7	Peru (PER)	62	75	89	226
8	Uruguay (URU)	19	16	23	58
9	Paraguay (PAR)	16	18	26	60
10	Panama (PAN)	8	5	8	21
11	Bolivia (BOL)	5	19	16	40
12	Guyana (GUY)	1	6	4	11
13	Suriname (SUR)	0	2	2	4
Totals (13 entries)		1,062	1,060	1,061	3,183

== Records ==
=== Boys ===
Event	Record	Athlete	Nationality	Date	Meet	Place	Ref.
100 m	10.36 (+1.2 m/s)	Vinícius Rocha Moraes	Brazil	12 November 2016	2016 Championships	Concordia, Argentina	
200 m	21.16 (+1.9 m/s)	Vinícius Rocha Moraes	Brazil	13 November 2016	2016 Championships	Concordia, Argentina	
400 m	47.46	Diego Venâncio	Brazil	19 October 2002	2002 Championships	Asunción, Paraguay	
800 m	1:50.6	Joseílton Cunha	Brazil	10 October 2010	2010 Championships	Santiago, Chile	
1500 m	3:53.72	Gonzalo Gervasini	Uruguay	9 September 2022	2022 Championships	São Paulo, Brazil	
3000 m	8:32.04	Pablo Ñauta	Ecuador	8 December 2024	2024 Championships	San Luis, Argentina	
110 m hurdles	13.55 (+0.4 m/s)	Marcos Morley	Ecuador	November 2016	2016 Championships	Concordia, Argentina	
400 m hurdles	51.67	Hederson Alves Estefani	Brazil	30 November 2008	2008 Championships	Lima, Peru	
2000 m steeplechase	5:52.2	José Gregorio Peña	Venezuela	26 September 2004	2004 Championships	Guayaquil, Ecuador	
High jump	2.10 m	Yohan Chaverra	Colombia	27 October 2012	2012 Championships	Mendoza, Argentina	
Pole vault	5.20 m	Germán Pablo Chiaraviglio	Argentina	25 September 2004	2004 Championships	Guayaquil, Ecuador	
Long jump	7.82 m (+1.2 m/s)	Jhamal Fernando Bowen	Panama	29 November 2008	2008 Championships	Lima, Peru	
Triple jump	15.83 m	Márcio Rogério da Cruz	Brazil	24 November 1990	1990 Championships	Lima, Peru	
Shot put	21.40 m A AR-y	Nazareno Sassia	Argentina	30 June 2018	2018 Championships	Cuenca, Ecuador	
Discus throw	60.92 m	Saymon Hoffman	Brazil	12 November 2016	2016 Championships	Concordia, Argentina	
Hammer throw	81.15 m AR-y	Joaquín Gómez	Argentina	27 October 2012	2012 Championships	Mendoza, Argentina	
Javelin throw	85.32 m	Braian Toledo	Argentina	10 October 2010	2010 Championships	Santiago, Chile	
Decathlon	6716 pts A	Henrique Pereira Silva	Brazil	30 June–1 July 2018	2018 Championships	Cuenca, Ecuador	
Decathlon	100m (wind) / Long jump (wind) / Shot put / High jump / 400m / 110m H (wind) / Discus / Pole vault / Javelin / 1500m; 10.82 (+1.0 m/s) / 6.46 m (−0.2 m/s) / 14.84 m / 1.77 m / 51.72 / 14.44 (+1.4 m/s) / 41.53 m / 3.00 m / 51.96 m / 5:26.09						
10,000 m walk (track)	40:27.95	Éider Arévalo	Colombia	10 October 2010	2010 Championships	Santiago, Chile	
4 × 100 m relay	40.77 A	Luiz Ambrosio da Silva; André Caliari Oliveira; Luis Eduardo Ambrosio; Bruno Nascimento Pacheco	Brazil	5 November 2000	2000 Championships	Bogotá, Colombia	

Key:
^{WR-y} World youth record	^{AR-y} South American youth record	^{NR-y} National youth record	^{A} affected by altitude

=== Girls ===
Event	Record	Athlete	Nationality	Date	Meet	Place	Ref.
100 m	11.48 (+1.3 m/s)	Franciela das Graças Krasucki	Brazil	25 September 2004	2004 Championships	Guayaquil, Ecuador	
200 m	23.57 A (+0.6 m/s)	Gabriela Suarez	Venezuela	1 July 2018	2018 Championships	Cuenca, Ecuador	
400 m	53.94 A	Yusmelis García	Venezuela	4 November 2000	2000 Championships	Bogotá, Colombia	
800 m	2:10.5	Yessica Quispe	Peru	26 September 2004	2004 Championships	Guayaquil, Ecuador	
1500 m	4:21.6	Yessica Quispe	Peru	25 September 2004	2004 Championships	Guayaquil, Ecuador	
3000 m	9:29.8	Yessica Quispe	Peru	25 September 2004	2004 Championships	Guayaquil, Ecuador	
100 m hurdles	13.66 (−1.5 m/s)	María Alejandra Murillo	Colombia	25 September 2021	2021 Championships	Encarnación, Paraguay	
400 m hurdles	59.33	Leticia de Oliveira	Brazil	26 September 2021	2021 Championships	Encarnación, Paraguay	
2000 m steeplechase	6:34.7 h	Sabine Letícia Heitling	Brazil	26 September 2004	2004 Championships	Guayaquil, Ecuador	
2000 m steeplechase	6:40.28	Zulema Arenas Huacasi	Peru	27 October 2012	2012 Championships	Mendoza, Argentina	
High jump	1.85 m	María Fernanda Murillo	Colombia	November 2016	2016 Championships	Concordia, Argentina	
Pole vault	3.90 m	Milena Agudelo	Colombia	19 October 1996	1996 Championships	Asunción, Paraguay	
Pole vault	3.90 m	Ana Gabriela Quiñónez	Ecuador	13 November 2016	2016 Championships	Concordia, Argentina	
Long jump	6.39 m (+0.4 m/s)	Vanessa dos Santos	Brazil	10 September 2022	2022 Championships	São Paulo, Brazil	
Triple jump	13.06 m (+1.5 m/s)	Leidy Cuesta	Colombia	13 November 2016	2016 Championships	Concordia, Argentina	
Shot put (3 kg)	17.24 m AR-y	Dayna Toledo	Chile	12 November 2016	2016 Championships	Concordia, Argentina	
Discus throw	48.22 m	Esthefania da Costa	Brazil	9 October 2010	2010 Championships	Santiago, Chile	
Hammer throw (3 kg)	65.92 m	Carolina Ulloa	Colombia	1 July 2018	2018 Championships	Cuenca, Ecuador	
Javelin throw (500 g)	54.33 m A AR-y	Juleisy Angulo	Ecuador	30 June 2018	2018 Championships	Cuenca, Ecuador	
Heptathlon	5090 pts	Leonela Graciani	Argentina	27–28 October 2012	2012 Championships	Mendoza, Argentina	
Heptathlon	5090 pts	100m H (wind) / High jump / Shot put / 200m (wind) / Long jump (wind) / Javelin / 800m; 14.53 (−3.3 m/s) / 1.57 m / 10.90 m (3 kg) / 25.18 (+0.8 m/s) / 5.55 m (NWI) / 38.74 m (500 g) / 2:32.08					
5000 m walk	22:33.63 AR-y	Yuli Capcha	Peru	9 October 2010	2010 Championships	Santiago, Chile	
4 × 100 m relay	45.99 A	Mileidy López; Yenny Díaz; Sandrine Legenort; Yusmelis García	Venezuela	5 November 2000	2000 Championships	Bogotá, Colombia	

=== Mixed events ===
Event	Record	Athlete	Nationality	Date	Meet	Place	Ref.
4 × 400 m relay	3:27.02	Stephanie Andreza Guimarães; Anderson Cordeiro Lima Cerqueira; Daysiellen Dias; Maykon do Nascimento	Brazil	30 November 2014	2014 Championships	Cali, Colombia	
8×300 m relay	4:54.20	Vitoria Pereira Jardim ? Erica Geni Barbosa Cavalheiro; Thais Michele Da Silva Clemente; Lucas Conceicao Vilar; Caio de Almeida Alves Teixeira; Joao Carlos Dos Santos Junior; Eduardo Ribeiro Moreira	Brazil	1 July 2018	2018 Championships	Cuenca, Ecuador	

Key:
^{WR-y} World youth record	^{AR-y} South American youth record	^{NR-y} National youth record	^{A} affected by altitude

=== Defunct events ===
Men

Event	Record	Name	Nation	Date	Meet	Place	Ref.
5000 m	14:53.94	Marcelo da Silva	Brazil	4 October 1992	1992 Championships	Santiago, Chile	
300 m hurdles	37.79	Víctor Hugo Goulart	Brazil	4 October 1992	1992 Championships	Santiago, Chile	
1500 m steeplechase	4:18.89	Julián Peralta	Argentina	2 October 1992	1992 Championships	Santiago, Chile	
Hexathlon	4172 pts	Moisés Pereira	Brazil	2–3 October 1992	1992 Championships	Santiago, Chile	
Hexathlon	4172 pts	14.24 (100 m hurdles), 12.16 m (shot put), 6.74 m (long jump), 43.56 m (javelin), 1.98 m (high jump), 2:10.53 (800 m)					
Octathlon	6141 pts	Jefferson de Carvalho Santos	Brazil	27–28 October 2012	2012 Championships	Mendoza, Argentina	
Octathlon	6141 pts	100m (wind) / Long jump (wind) / Shot put / 400m / 110m H (wind) / High jump / Javelin / 1000m; 11.44 (−2.6 m/s) / 7.22 m (+1.6 m/s) / 15.44 m / 51.64 / 14.27 (−2.6 m/s) / 2.06 m / 42.67 m / 2:59.18					
5000 m walk	19:49.54	Jefferson Pérez	Ecuador	22 November 1990	1990 Championships	Lima, Peru	
4 × 400 m relay	3:18.42	Humberto de Oliveira; Cristian Dunker; Carlos Santos; Rodolfo dos Santos	Brazil	20 October 1996	1996 Championships	Asunción, Paraguay	
Swedish relay	1:51.65	Diego Venâncio (100m); Jorge Célio da Rocha Sena (200m); Bruno de Alcántara Góes (300m); Rafael da Silva Ribeiro (400m)	Brazil	20 October 2002	2002 Championships	Asunción, Paraguay	

Women

Event	Record	Name	Nation	Date	Meet	Place	Ref.
600 m	1:33.1	Marcela López Espinosa	Argentina	7 November 1976	1976 Championships	Santiago, Chile	
80 metres hurdles	11.75	Beatriz Capotosto	Argentina	11 November 1978	1978 Championships	Montevideo, Uruguay	
300 m hurdles	43.18	Rúbia dos Santos	Brazil	19 October 1996	1996 Championships	Asunción, Paraguay	
Shot put (4 kg)	15.67 m	Natalia Ducó	Chile	15 October 2006	2006 Championships	Caracas, Venezuela	
Hammer throw (4 kg)	56.68 m A	Jennifer Dahlgren	Argentina	4 November 2000	2000 Championships	Bogotá, Colombia	
Javelin throw (600 g)	48.04 m	Jucilene Sales de Lima	Brazil	25 September 2004	2004 Championships	Guayaquil, Ecuador	
Pentathlon	3642 pts A	Rosemarie Boeck	Peru	November 1975	1975 Championships	Quito, Ecuador	
Pentathlon	3642 pts A	60m H / High jump / Shot put / Long jump / 800m					
Heptathlon (old implements)	5347 pts	Tamara de Sousa	Brazil	9–10 October 2010	2010 Championships	Santiago, Chile	
Heptathlon (old implements)	5347 pts	100m H (wind) / High jump / Shot put / 200m (wind) / Long jump (wind) / Javelin / 800m; 14.37 (−0.7 m/s) / 1.62 m / 13.47 m (4 kg) / 25.29 (−1.0 m/s) / 5.75 m (−0.7 m/s) / 40.73 m (600 g) / 2:38.75					
3000 m walk	14:04.99 A	Luisa Paltín	Ecuador	23 October 1998	1998 Championships	Manaus, Brazil	
4 × 400 m relay	3:49.67	Flávia da Silva; Mislene da Silva; Adriana da Silva; Rúbia dos Santos	Brazil	20 October 1996	1996 Championships	Asunción, Paraguay	
Swedish relay	2:11.6	Franciela das Graças Krasucki (100m); Fernanda Aprigio (200m); Gisele de Oliveira Cruz (300m); Kamilla Felix Miranda (400m)	Brazil	26 September 2004	2004 Championships	Guayaquil, Ecuador	
