= Athletics at the 2018 Summer Youth Olympics – Girls' javelin throw =

Girls' javelin throw at the III Summer Youth Olympic Games
- Venue: Parque Polideportivo Roca
- Date: 13 October and 16 October 2018
- Competitors: 15 from 15 nations

Medalists
1st place, gold medalist(s)		Elina Tzengko	Greece
2nd place, silver medalist(s)		Juleisy Angulo	Ecuador
3rd place, bronze medalist(s)		Münevver Hancı	Turkey

The girls' javelin throw competition at the 2018 Summer Youth Olympics was held on 13 and 16 October, at the Parque Polideportivo Roca.

== Schedule ==
All times are in local time (UTC-3).

Date	Time	Round
13 October 2018	14:35	Stage 1
16 October 2018	14:10	Stage 2

== Results ==
=== Stage 1 ===
Rank	Athlete	Nation	1	2	3	4	Result	Notes
1	Elina Tzengko	Greece	x	62.47	57.21	63.34	63.34	PB
2	Juleisy Angulo	Ecuador	54.43	59.82	55.62	57.65	59.82	AYR
3	Münevver Hancı	Turkey	55.57	57.41	49.30	52.93	57.41	
4	Aliaksandra Konshina	Belarus	52.85	x	x	55.06	55.06	
5	Wang Ying	China	54.77	53.97	x	54.31	54.77	
6	Gedly Tugi	Estonia	46.73	52.65	x	x	52.65	
7	Lea Wipper	Germany	x	48.23	x	50.54	50.54	
8	Skylar Ciccolini	United States	44.00	49.90	x	x	49.90	
9	Bruna de Jesus	Brazil	46.57	47.93	42.28	46.06	47.93	
10	Minna Hollanti	Finland	x	47.11	x	x	47.11	
11	Martha Nthanze Musai	Kenya	43.23	46.60	41.90	46.89	46.89	
12	Ivana Koktava	Czech Republic	44.14	46.80	x	x	46.80	
13	Luceris Suares	Colombia	44.39	44.27	x	45.21	45.21	
14	Yuika Nakamura	Japan	43.62	40.06	x	40.98	43.62	
15	Xochitl Montoya Coronado	Mexico	41.74	39.17	39.19	41.22	41.74	

=== Stage 2 ===
Rank	Athlete	Nation	1	2	3	4	Result	Notes
1	Elina Tzengko	Greece	61.74	60.68	58.50	54.91	61.74	
2	Wang Ying	China	57.14	53.64	56.77	x	57.14	
3	Münevver Hancı	Turkey	54.34	57.06	55.85	56.45	57.06	
4	Juleisy Angulo	Ecuador	x	55.21	45.07	x	55.21	
5	Aliaksandra Konshina	Belarus	55.20	53.44	52.43	x	55.20	
6	Skylar Ciccolini	United States	55.07	47.42	49.37	53.25	55.07	PB
7	Gedly Tugi	Estonia	48.54	x	52.60	49.63	52.60	
8	Lea Wipper	Germany	44.84	44.31	45.91	49.18	49.18	
9	Bruna de Jesus	Brazil	46.96	47.36	x	45.57	47.36	
10	Martha Nthanze Musai	Kenya	46.52	45.69	x	45.72	46.52	
11	Minna Hollanti	Finland	x	x	45.53	44.44	45.53	
12	Luceris Suares	Colombia	40.43	41.17	44.87	42.75	44.87	
13	Ivana Koktava	Czech Republic	42.72	41.65	41.87	42.76	42.76	
14	Xochitl Montoya Coronado	Mexico	33.80	40.95	x	42.03	42.03	
	Yuika Nakamura	Japan					DNS	

=== Final placing ===
Rank	Athlete	Nation	Stage 1	Stage 2	Total
1st place, gold medalist(s)	Elina Tzengko	Greece	63.34	61.74	125.08
2nd place, silver medalist(s)	Juleisy Angulo	Ecuador	59.82	55.21	115.03
3rd place, bronze medalist(s)	Münevver Hancı	Turkey	57.41	57.06	114.47
4	Wang Ying	China	54.77	57.14	111.91
5	Aliaksandra Konshina	Belarus	55.06	55.20	110.26
6	Gedly Tugi	Estonia	52.65	52.60	105.25
7	Skylar Ciccolini	United States	49.90	55.07	104.97
8	Lea Wipper	Germany	50.54	49.18	99.72
9	Bruna de Jesus	Brazil	47.93	47.36	95.29
10	Martha Nthanze Musai	Kenya	46.89	46.52	93.41
11	Minna Hollanti	Finland	47.11	45.53	92.64
12	Luceris Suares	Colombia	45.21	44.87	90.08
13	Ivana Koktava	Czech Republic	46.80	42.76	89.56
14	Xochitl Montoya Coronado	Mexico	41.74	42.03	83.77
	Yuika Nakamura	Japan	43.62	DNS	
