= Adriana González =

German operatic mezzo-soprano

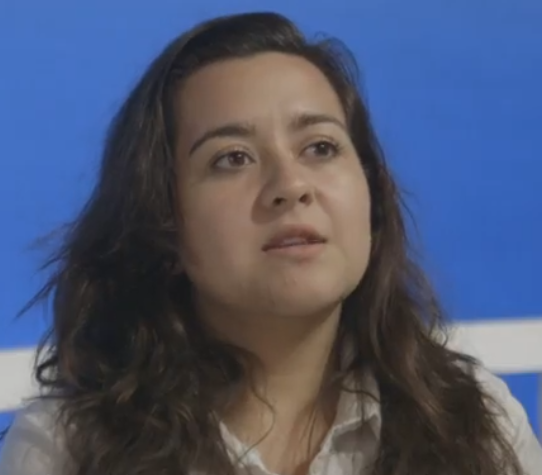
- In a 2017 interview
- Born: 1991 (age 34–35); Guatemala
- Occupation: Operatic soprano
- Website: www.gonzalezadriana.com

Adriana González (born 1991) is an operatic soprano from Guatemala who made an international career.

== Career ==
González was born in 1991 in Guatemala. She became a member of the opera studio of the Paris Opéra. During her training, she performed roles including Despina in Mozart's Così fan tutte and Zerlina in Don Giovanni. In the 2017/18 season, she became a member of the studio of the Zürich Opera, where she performed as Serpetta in Mozart's La finta giardiniera. After completing her studies she appeared as Pamina in Mozart's Die Zauberflöte, Corinna in Rossini's Il viaggio a Reims and Mimì in Puccini's La bohème. She first appeared as Micaëla in Bizet's Carmen at the Opéra des Nations at the Grand Théâtre de Genève, repeated at the Dutch National Opera in 2022.
