= Central American Age Group Championships in Athletics =

Regional athletics competition

The Central American Age Group Championships in Athletics (Campeonatos Centroamericanos Juvenil C y Infantil A) is an athletics event organized by the Confederación Atlética del Istmo Centroamericano CADICA (Central American Isthmus Athletic Confederation) which is open for athletes from member associations. The event is divided into the Junior C (U-16) Central American Championships and the Infantile A (U-14) Central American Championships. The Junior C category is open for girls and boys aged 14–15. The Infantile A category is open for girls and boys aged 12–13. The competition started to be open for age groups U-14 (Spanish: Infantil A) and U-12 (Spanish: Infantil B) as Campeonatos Centroamericanos Infantil. There is a report on an early competition held in the year 1984 in El Salvador. From 1999 onwards, it is verified that the competition was held annually. In 2007, the format was changed to be open for the age groups U-16 and U-14, with U-12 competitions being held occasionally. In 2012, a specific Central American "Kids Athletics" tournament (Spanish: Torneo Centroamericano Kids Athletics) was introduced for the age group of 9–11 years.

== Editions ==
The following list was compiled from the CADICA website, and from a variety of other websites and articles from the archives of different newspapers.

=== Campeonatos Centroamericanos Infantil ===
Edition	Year	City	Country	Date	Venue	No. of Events	No. of Athletes
	1994		El Salvador				
III	1996	San José	Costa Rica	November 9 - 10	Estadio Nacional		
	1997	Ciudad de Guatemala	Guatemala	June 19–20			
V	1999	San Salvador	El Salvador	September 18–19			
VI	2000	San Pedro Sula	Honduras	September 9–10			
VII	2001	Tegucigalpa	Honduras	June 9–10			
VIII	2002	Santa Ana	El Salvador	August 17–18	Complejo Deportivo INDES		
IX	2003	San José	Costa Rica	September 4–6	Estadio Nacional		
X	2004	San Pedro Sula	Honduras	October 1–2			
XI	2005	San Salvador	El Salvador	June 18–19	Estadio Nacional Flor Blanca		
XII	2006	San Salvador	El Salvador	November 18–19	Estadio Jorge "Mágico" González		

=== Campeonatos Centroamericanos Juvenil C y Infantil A ===
Edition	Year	City	Country	Date	Venue	No. of Events	No. of Athletes
I	2007	San Salvador	El Salvador	November 9–10	Estadio Nacional Flor Blanca "Magico Gonzalez"		
II	2008	Managua	Nicaragua	November 21–22	Instituto Nicaragüense de Deportes		
III	2009	San José	Costa Rica	November 27–28	Estadio Nacional		
IV	2010	San Pedro Sula	Honduras	November 26–27	Estadio Olímpico Metropolitano		
V	2011	Managua	Nicaragua	November 25–27	Estadio de Atletismo del Instituto Nicaragüense de Deportes		
VI	2012	San José	Costa Rica	November 23–25	Estadio Nacional		
VII	2013	San Salvador	El Salvador	November 22–24			
VIII	2014	San José	Costa Rica	November 14–16			
IX	2015	San José	Costa Rica	November 27–29			
