= Juleisy Angulo =

Ecuadorean javelin thrower (born 2001)

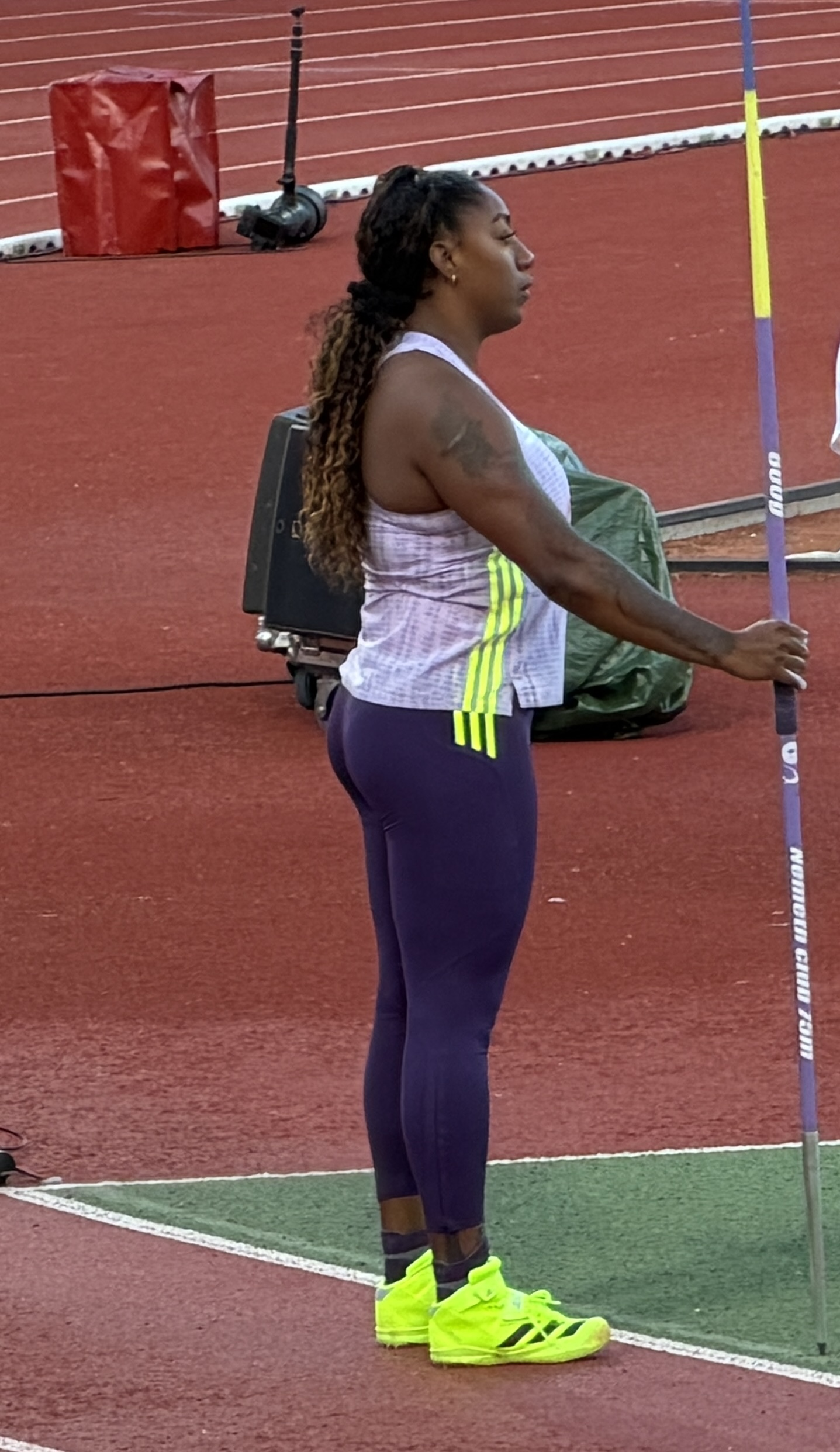
- Angulo in 2026

Personal information
- Born: 2 January 2001 (age 25)

Sport
- Sport: Athletics
- Event: Javelin throw

Achievements and titles
- Personal bests: Javelin: 65.12 m (Tokyo, 2025) NR
Medal record
Representing Ecuador
Women's athletics
World Championships
| Gold medal – first place | 2025 Tokyo | Javelin throw |
Ibero-American Championships
| Gold medal – first place | 2022 Alicante | Javelin throw |
South American Games
| Bronze medal – third place | 2022 Asunción | Javelin throw |
South American Championships
| Silver medal – second place | 2025 Mar del Plata | Javelin throw |
Youth Olympic Games
| Silver medal – second place | 2018 Buenos Aires | Javelin throw |
Junior Pan American Games
| Gold medal – first place | 2021 Cali-Valle | Javelin throw |
Pan American U20 Championships
| Gold medal – first place | 2017 Trujillo | Javelin throw |
| Gold medal – first place | 2019 San José | Javelin throw |
South American Youth Games
| Gold medal – first place | 2017 Santiago | Javelin throw |
South American U23 Championships
| Gold medal – first place | 2021 Guayaquil | Javelin throw |
| Gold medal – first place | 2022 Cascavel | Javelin throw |
| Silver medal – second place | 2018 Cuenca | Javelin throw |
South American U20 Championships
| Gold medal – first place | 2017 Leonora | Javelin throw |
| Gold medal – first place | 2019 Cali | Javelin throw |
South American U18 Championships
| Gold medal – first place | 2016 Concordia | Javelin throw |
| Gold medal – first place | 2018 Cuenca | Javelin throw |

Juleisy Angulo (born 2 January 2001) is an Ecuadorian javelin thrower and national record holder. She is the reigning World Champion, having won the title at the 2025 World Athletics Championships to become Ecuador's first female world champion.

== Biography ==
Angulo is from El Oro Province in Ecuador. She was a silver medalist in the javelin throw at the 2018 Youth Olympic Games in Buenos Aires, Argentina, finishing behind Greece's Elina Tzengko.

In June 2018, she broke the South American under-20 record for the javelin throw with 57.94 metres, breaking the record held by Colombian María Lucelly Murillo. She won the 2019 Pan American U20 Athletics Championships in Costa Rica with a personal best throw of 58.96 metres in July 2019. The following month, she finished seventh in the javelin throw at the senior 2019 Pan American Games in Lima, Peru.

She placed fourth overall in the javelin throw at the 2021 South American Championships, held in Ecuador in May 2021. That year, she won the gold medal at the 2021 South American Athletics U23 Championships. In December, she won the gold medal at the 2021 Junior Pan American Games in Cali, Colombia, with a throw of 58.26 metres.

On 16 April 2022, she won the Ecuador Athletics Championships with a throw of 60.22 meters in Guayaquil. The following month, she set a new national record of 60.91 meters to win the 2022 Ibero-American Championships in La Nucia, Spain. She competed at the 2022 World Athletics Championships in Eugene, Oregon, but did not advance to the final. She retained her title at the 2022 South American Athletics U23 Championships in Cascavel, Brazil. She won the bronze medal in the javelin throw at the 2022 South American Games in Asunción, Paraguay, with a national record 61.10 metres.

She finished fourth in the javelin throw at the 2023 South American Championships in São Paulo, Brazil. She competed at the 2023 World Athletics Championships in Budapest, Hungary, but did not advance to the final.

She won the silver medal in the javelin throw at the 2025 South American Championships in Mar del Plata, Argentina, throwing a national and championship record in round one of 62.25m, before later being overtaken by Jucilene de Lima of Brazil. In August 2025, she increased the Ecuadorean national record to 62.33 metres whilst competing in Brazil.

She won the gold medal at the 2025 World Athletics Championships in Tokyo, Japan, to become Ecuador's first ever female world gold medallist and the first gold medallist outside of racewalking. In the preliminary round she threw a national record 63.25 metres to advance to the final, before improving to 65.13 metres in the final to win the title.
