= 2016 South American U18 Championships in Athletics =

XXIII South American Youth Championships in Athletics
- Dates: 12–13 November
- Host city: Concordia, Argentina
- Venue: Centro de Desarrollo Deportivo
- Level: Youth
- Events: 39
- Participation: 11 nations

The 23rd South American Youth Championships in Athletics were held in Concordia, Argentina on 12 and 13 November 2016.

== Medal summary ==
=== Men ===
Event	Gold		Silver		Bronze	
100 metres +1.8 m/s	Vinicius Rocha Moraes; Brazil	10.36 GR	Tryell Peters; Guyana	10.68	Sebastián Hood; Chile	10.81
200 metres -3.9 m/s	Vinicius Rocha Moraes; Brazil	21.41 GR	Cleverson Pereira Junior; Brazil	21.93	Daniel Williams; Guyana	22.11
400 metres	Bruno Benedito da Silva; Brazil	48.12	Daniel Williams; Guyana	48.57	Cleverson Pereira Junior; Brazil	48.94
800 metres	Max Paulo dos Santos; Brazil	1:56.79	Marco Vilca; Peru	1:58.37	Diego Facundo Alegre; Argentina	1:58.98
1500 metres	José Miguel Costa; Brazil	4:09.97	Andrés Mauricio Carrillo; Colombia	4:10.44	Pablo Cárdenas; Chile	4:11.01
3000 metres	Jhonathan Pulido; Colombia	8:45.39	Alexander Huanca; Peru	8:46.98	José Zabala; Argentina	8:50.54
110 metres hurdles (91.4 cm) +0.4 m/s	Marcos Morley; Ecuador	13.55 GR	Diego Alejandro Vivas; Colombia	14.27	Cristobal Victoriano; Chile	14.32
400 metres hurdles (84 cm)	Caio Giovani Martins; Brazil	53.00	Cristobal Muñoz; Chile	53.45	Luciano Techeira; Uruguay	54.48
2000 m steeplechase	Jeferson Alberto dos Santos; Brazil	6:00.20	Edwar Condori; Peru	6:02.75	José Armando Sánchez; Ecuador	6:11.09
10,000 m track walk	David Hurtado; Ecuador	43:16.07	Sebastián Merchán; Colombia	43:48.63	Yhojan Melillan; Chile	45:08.47
High jump	Francisco Moraga; Chile	2.00	Daniel Williams; Guyana	2.00	Luiz Gustavo de Brito; Brazil	2.00
Pole vault	Lucca Torres; Brazil	4.90	Agustin Zulueta; Chile	4.50	Eduardo Martín; Chile	4.40
Long jump	Gabriel Menezes Oliveira; Brazil	7.45	Yeimer Palacios; Colombia	7.45	Juan David Moreno; Colombia	7.37
Triple jump	Gabriel Menezes Oliveira; Brazil	15.45	Yeimer Palacios; Colombia	15.31	Juan Luis Eguiguren; Chile	14.23
Shot put (5 kg)	Saymon Hoffmann; Brazil	19.67	Claudio Romero; Chile	19.14	Nicolas Tieri; Argentina	18.98
Discus throw (1.5 kg)	Saymon Hoffmann; Brazil	60.92 GR	Claudio Romero; Chile	60.49	Vitor Motin; Brazil	57.64
Hammer throw (5 kg)	Alejandro Medina; Paraguay	75.18	Alencar Pereira; Brazil	74.39	Roberto Montiel; Chile	67.15
Javelin throw (700 kg)	Pedro Henrique Rodrigues; Brazil	77.30	Joel Benítez; Venezuela	69.10	Ignacio Toledo; Chile	64.83
Decathlon (youth)	Damian Moretta; Argentina	6525 GR	Nicolás Pérez; Argentina	5965	Diego Arias; Chile	5910
WR world record | AR area record | CR championship record | GR games record | NR national record | OR Olympic record | PB personal best | SB season best | WL world leading (in a given season)

=== Women ===
Event	Gold		Silver		Bronze	
100 metres +0.5 m/s	Lorraine Martins; Brazil	11.78	Romina Cifuentes; Ecuador	11.81	Gabriela Mourão; Brazil	11.82
200 metres -2.2 m/s	Romina Cifuentes; Ecuador	24.44	Gabriela Mourão; Brazil	24.90	Lorraine Martins; Brazil	24.98
400 metres	Tiffani Beatriz Marinho; Brazil	54.90	Tania Caicedo; Ecuador	55.87	Angie Nagles; Colombia	56.13
800 metres	Pamela Milano; Venezuela	2:17.58	Pamela Dias; Brazil	2:18.20	Valeria Cornejo; Chile	2:18.42
1500 metres	María Paula Guerrero; Colombia	4:51.88	Leidy Ortiz; Colombia	4:54.76	Isabelle Cristina de Almeida; Brazil	4:55.63
3000 metres	Agustina Boucherie; Argentina	10:26.80	Virginia Huatorongo; Peru	10:28.20	Sonia Salazar; Peru	10:28.47
100 metres hurdles (76.2 cm) +2.8 m/s	Micaela Rosa de Mello; Brazil	13.54 GR	Yoveini Mota; Venezuela	13.68	Yuly Andrea Quinto; Colombia	13.95
400 metres hurdles	Rita de Cassia Silva; Brazil	60.78	Micaela Rosa de Mello; Brazil	61.33	Oriana Prieto; Argentina	62.09
2000 m steeplechase	Clara Baiocchi; Argentina	6:56.62	Heidi Bola; Colombia	7:03.26	Giovanna Domene; Brazil	7:19.25
4600 m track walk	Glenda Morejón; Ecuador		Mary Luz Andía; Peru		Laura Chalarca; Colombia	
High jump	María Fernanda Murillo; Colombia	1.85 GR	Victoria Rozas; Chile	1.73	María Parra; Venezuela	1.70
Pole vault	Ana Gabriela Quiñónez; Ecuador	3.90 =GR, NR	Carmen Villanueva; Venezuela	3.90 =GR	Isabel de Quadros; Brazil	3.70
Long jump	Yuly Quinto; Colombia	6.13 GR	Valentina Leiva; Chile	5.99w	Chantoba Bright; Guyana	5.94w
Triple jump	Leidy Cuesta; Colombia	13.20w GR	Mirieli Santos; Brazil	13.08w	Liz Levrino; Argentina	12.32w
Shot put (3 kg)	Dayna Toledo; Chile	17.24 GR	Gleice Stefanie de Castro; Brazil	16.15	Fernanda Holguin; Ecuador	14.69
Discus throw	Catalina Bravo; Chile	44.57	Valquiria Meurer; Brazil	42.37	Yosiris Córdoba; Colombia	36.27
Hammer throw (3 kg)	Mariana García; Chile	64.31 GR	Ximena Zorrilla; Peru	60.65	Antonella Creazzola; Venezuela	59.02
Javelin throw (500 g)	Juleisy Angulo; Ecuador	51.20	Fabielle Ferreira; Brazil	49.40	Yudi Rivera; Ecuador	46.92
Heptathlon (youth)	Naiuri Rigo Krein; Brazil	4811	Mariangeles Manno; Argentina	4390	Neurelis Manzanillo; Venezuela	4366
WR world record | AR area record | CR championship record | GR games record | NR national record | OR Olympic record | PB personal best | SB season best | WL world leading (in a given season)

=== Mixed ===
Event	Gold		Silver		Bronze	
Mixed 4 × 400 metres relay	Brazil; Bruno Benedito da Silva; Rita de Cassia Silva; Tiffani Beatriz Marinho; Cleverson Pereira Junior	3:30.12	Chile; Karina Mendoza; Andres Orrego; Katherine Córdoba; Cristóbal Muñoz	3:36.48	Colombia; Angie Nagles; Manuel Henao; María Paula Guerrero; Kevin Angarita	3:37.24

== Medal table ==
Rank	Nation	Gold	Silver	Bronze	Total
1	Brazil (BRA)	19	9	8	36
2	Ecuador (ECU)	6	2	3	11
3	Colombia (COL)	5	7	7	19
4	Chile (CHI)	4	7	10	21
5	Argentina (ARG)	3	2	5	10
6	Venezuela (VEN)	1	3	3	7
7	Paraguay (PAR)	1	0	0	1
8	Peru (PER)	0	6	1	7
9	Guyana (GUY)	0	3	2	5
10	Uruguay (URU)	0	0	1	1
Totals (10 entries)		39	39	40	118
