= Philippines at the 2018 Summer Youth Olympics =

- IOC code: PHI
- NOC: Philippine Olympic Committee
- Website: www.olympic.ph

in Buenos Aires
- Competitors: 7 in 6 sports
- Flag bearers: Yuka Saso (Opening); Christian Tio (Closing)
- Medals Ranked 79th: Gold 0 Silver 1 Bronze 0 Total 1

Summer Youth Olympics appearances (overview)
- 2010; 2014; 2018; 2026

The Philippines participated at the 2018 Summer Youth Olympics, in Buenos Aires, Argentina from 6 October to 18 October 2018.

Kiteboarder Christian Tio won a silver medal men's kiteboarding IKA Twin Tip racing event; the first medal of any color credited to the National Olympic Committee (NOC) of the Philippines in the games' medal tally.

Previously, Archer Luis Gabriel Moreno along with a Chinese partner won a gold medal in the 2014 Summer Youth Olympics in the mixed international team event although the medal was neither credited to the NOC of the Philippines or China.

== Background ==
The first Filipino athlete to qualify for the 2018 Summer Youth Olympics was Nicole Marie Tagle who secured qualification through the 2017 World Archery Youth Championships in October 2017.

The Philippines qualified its second athlete when Christian Tio of Boracay qualified for Summer Youth Olympics. He clinched the sole berth contested for the boy's twin tip racing event at the Asian qualifiers in Pranburi, Thailand on March 18, 2018.

The Philippines qualified its fifth athlete when fencer Lawrence Tan qualified for the Summer Youth Olympics. He secured his qualification for the individual boy's Foil (fencing) event at the 2018 Junior and Cadets World Fencing Championships held in Verona, Italy in April 2018.

Jonne Go of Canoe Kayak and Dragonboat served as the chief of mission of the Philippine delegation.

== Medalists ==
=== Medal table ===
| Sport | Gold | Silver | Bronze | Total |
|---|---|---|---|---|
| Sailing | 0 | 1 | 0 | 1 |
| Total | 0 | 1 | 0 | 1 |

=== Medalists ===
The following Filipino competitors won medals at the Youth Olympics.

| Medal | Athlete | Sport | Event | Date |
|---|---|---|---|---|
| Silver | Christian Tio | Sailing | Boys' IKA Twin Tip Racing | October 14 |

== Archery ==
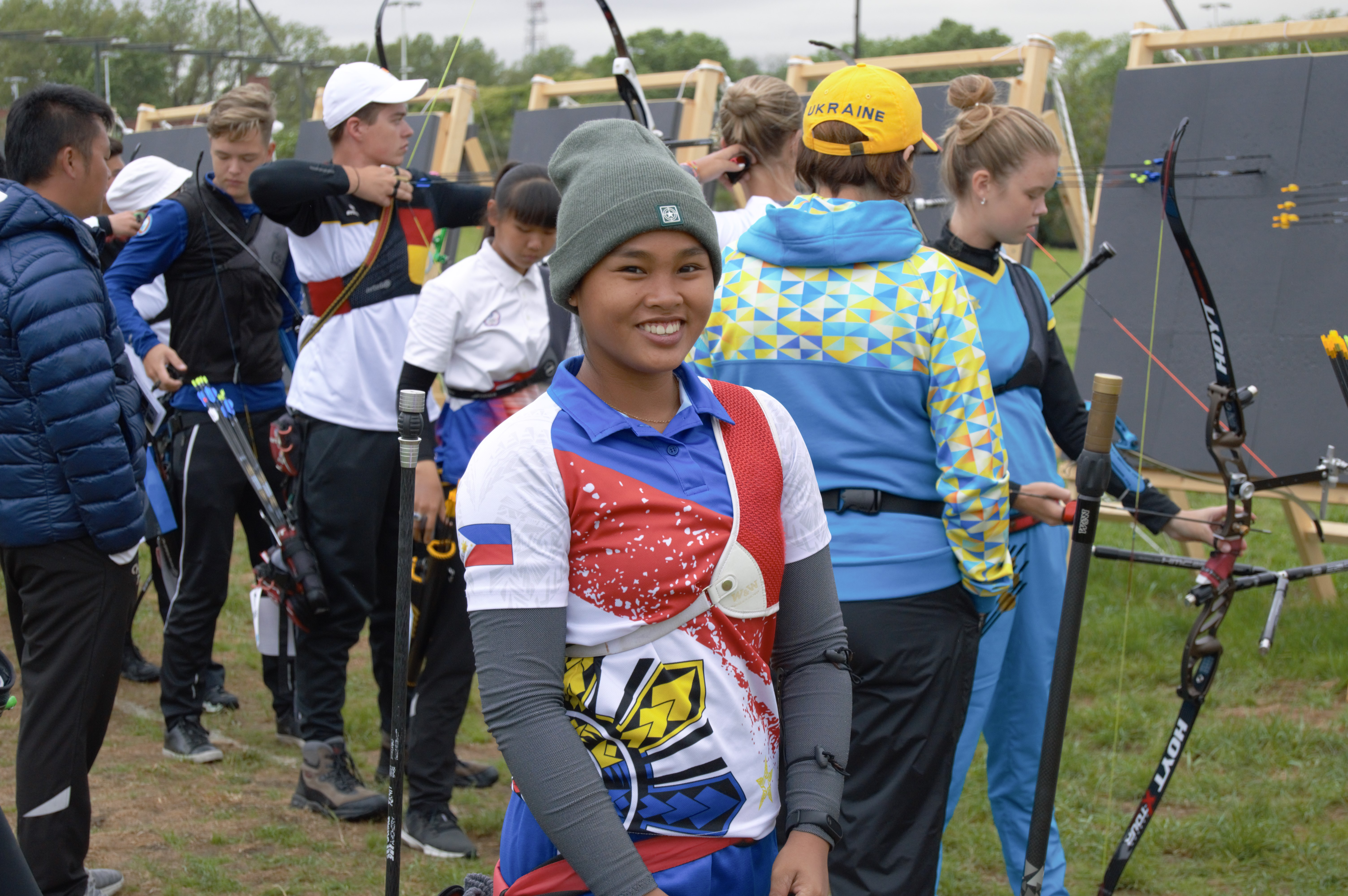
Nicole Marie Tagle at the mixed team ranking round.

The Philippines qualified one archer based on its performance at the 2017 World Archery Youth Championships.

Individual

| Athlete | Event | Ranking round | | Round of 32 | Round of 16 | Quarterfinals | Semifinals | Final / BM | Rank |
| Athlete | Event | Score | Seed | Opposition Score | Opposition Score | Opposition Score | Opposition Score | Opposition Score | Rank |
|---|---|---|---|---|---|---|---|---|---|
| Nicole Marie Tagle | Girls' Individual | 629 | 23 | Tromans-Ansell (GBR); L 4–6 | did not advance | | | | 17 |

Team

| Athletes | Event | Ranking round | | Round of 32 | Round of 16 | Quarterfinals | Semifinals | Final / BM | Rank |
| Athletes | Event | Score | Seed | Opposition Score | Opposition Score | Opposition Score | Opposition Score | Opposition Score | Rank |
|---|---|---|---|---|---|---|---|---|---|
| Nicole Marie Tagle (PHI); Hendrik Õun (EST) | Mixed team | 1300 | 13 | Bassi (CHI); Dalpatadu (SRI); W 5–4 | Tromans-Ansell (GBR); Shabani (IRI); W 5–3 | Jones (NZL); Tang (TPE); L 1–5 | did not advance | | 6 |

== Fencing ==
The Philippines qualified one fencer, Lawrence Tan, in the individual boy's foil event based on its performance at the 2018 Junior and Cadets World Fencing Championships held in Verona, Italy in April 2018.

Tan is the first Filipino fencer to qualify for the Youth Olympic Games.

Boys

| Athlete | Event | Pool Round | Seed | Round of 16 | Quarterfinals | Semifinals | Final / BM | Rank |
| Athlete | Event | Opposition Score | Seed | Opposition Score | Opposition Score | Opposition Score | Opposition Score | Rank |
|---|---|---|---|---|---|---|---|---|
| Lawrence Everett Tan | Foil | Pool No:1 Bravo (USA); L 0–5 | 5 | Chan (HKG); L 11–15 | did not advance | | | 10 |
| Lawrence Everett Tan | Foil | Ciccarelli (AUS); W 5–1 | 5 | Chan (HKG); L 11–15 | did not advance | | | 10 |
| Lawrence Everett Tan | Foil | Machhi (ITA); W 5–4 | 5 | Chan (HKG); L 11–15 | did not advance | | | 10 |
| Lawrence Everett Tan | Foil | Chen (TPE); L 1–5 | 5 | Chan (HKG); L 11–15 | did not advance | | | 10 |
| Lawrence Everett Tan | Foil | Spichiger (FRA); L 2–5 | 5 | Chan (HKG); L 11–15 | did not advance | | | 10 |
| Lawrence Everett Tan | Foil | Charreu (POR); L 3–5 | 5 | Chan (HKG); L 11–15 | did not advance | | | 10 |

== Golf ==
Individual

| Athlete | Event | Round 1 | | Round 2 | | | Round 3 | | | Bronze Medal Play-off | Total | | |
| Athlete | Event | Score | Rank | Score | Total | Rank | Score | Total | Rank | Score | Score | Par | Rank |
|---|---|---|---|---|---|---|---|---|---|---|---|---|---|
| Yuka Saso | Girls' Individual | 71 (+1) | 2 | 74 (+4) | 145 | 11 | 69 (−1) | 214 | 1 | 5 (+1) | 214 | +4 | 4 |
| Carl Jano Corpus | Boys' Individual | 71 (+1) | 5 | 76 (+6) | 147 | 20 | 76 (+6) | 223 | 20 | —N/a | 223 | +13 | 16 |

Team

| Athletes | Event | Round 1 (Fourball) | | Round 2 (Foursome) | | Round 3 (Individual Stroke) | | | | Total | | |
| Athletes | Event | Score | Rank | Score | Rank | Girl | Boy | Total | Rank | Score | Par | Rank |
|---|---|---|---|---|---|---|---|---|---|---|---|---|
| Yuka Saso; Carl Jano Corpus | Mixed team | 66 (−4) | 16 | 75 (+5) | 18 | 74 | 74 | 148 (+8) | 16 | 289 | +9 | 20 |

== Sailing ==
The Philippines qualified one boat based on its performance at the Asian and Oceania IKA Twin Tip Racing Qualifiers.

Boys

| Athlete | Event | Race | | | | | | | | | | | | Total Points | Net Points | Final Rank |
| Athlete | Event | 1 | 2 | 3 | 4 | 5 | 6 | 7 | 8 | 9 | 10 | 11 | 12 | Total Points | Net Points | Final Rank |
|---|---|---|---|---|---|---|---|---|---|---|---|---|---|---|---|---|
| Christian Tio | IKA Twin Tip Racing | 2 | 5 | (8) | 3 | (8) | 3 | CAN | | | | | | 29 | 13 | 2nd place, silver medalist(s) |

== Swimming ==
Girls

| Athlete | Event | Heat | | Semifinal | | Final | |
| Athlete | Event | Time | Rank | Time | Rank | Time | Rank |
|---|---|---|---|---|---|---|---|
| Nicole Oliva | 100 m freestyle | 57.33 | 26 | did not advance | | | |
| Nicole Oliva | 200 m freestyle | 2:02.08 | 8Q | —N/a | | 2:02.13 | 7 |
| Nicole Oliva | 400 m freestyle | 4:16.72 | 4Q | —N/a | | 4:16.61 | 6 |
| Nicole Oliva | 800 m freestyle | 8:52.29 | 11 | —N/a | | did not advance | |

== Table tennis ==
The Philippines qualified one athlete based on its performance at the "Road to Buenos Aires – Oceania" qualifier held in Rarotonga in the Cook Islands.

Singles

| Athlete | Event | Group Stage | Rank | Round of 16 | Quarterfinals | Semifinals | Final / BM | Rank |
| Athlete | Event | Opposition Score | Rank | Opposition Score | Opposition Score | Opposition Score | Opposition Score | Rank |
|---|---|---|---|---|---|---|---|---|
| Jann Mari Nayre | Boys' singles | Group B Burgos (CHI); W 4–1 | 4 | did not advance | | | | 25 |
| Jann Mari Nayre | Boys' singles | Kolodziejczyk (AUT); L 0–4 | 4 | did not advance | | | | 25 |
| Jann Mari Nayre | Boys' singles | Jha (USA); L 0–4 | 4 | did not advance | | | | 25 |

Team

| Athletes | Event | Group Stage | Rank | Round of 16 | Quarterfinals | Semifinals | Final / BM | Rank |
| Athletes | Event | Opposition Score | Rank | Opposition Score | Opposition Score | Opposition Score | Opposition Score | Rank |
|---|---|---|---|---|---|---|---|---|
| Intercontinental 2 Jann Mari Nayre (PHI); Annika Lundström (FIN) | Mixed international team | Group B Europe 3 Bogdanova (BLR); Sgouropoulos (GRE); L 0–3 | 3 | did not advance | | | | 17 |
| Intercontinental 2 Jann Mari Nayre (PHI); Annika Lundström (FIN) | Mixed international team | Intercontinental 1 Lee (HKG); Hamdoun (TUN); W 2–1 | 3 | did not advance | | | | 17 |
| Intercontinental 2 Jann Mari Nayre (PHI); Annika Lundström (FIN) | Mixed international team | Chinese Taipei; Su (TPE); Lin (TPE); L 0–3 | 3 | did not advance | | | | 17 |
