= Athletics at the 2018 Summer Youth Olympics – Boys' 110 metre hurdles =

Boys' 110 metre hurdles at the III Summer Youth Olympic Games
- Venue: Parque Polideportivo Roca
- Date: 13 and 16 October 2018
- Competitors: 18 from 18 nations

Medalists
1st place, gold medalist(s)		Owaab Barrow	Qatar
2nd place, silver medalist(s)		Kenny Fletcher	France
3rd place, bronze medalist(s)		Addis Wong Lok Hei	Hong Kong

The boys' 110 metre hurdles competition at the 2018 Summer Youth Olympics was held on 13 and 16 October, at the Parque Polideportivo Roca.

== Schedule ==
All times are in local time (UTC-3).

Date	Time	Round
13 October 2018	17:15	Stage 1
16 October 2018	17:15	Stage 2

== Results ==
=== Stage 1 ===
Rank	Heat	Lane	Athlete	Nation	Result	Notes
1	3	5	Owaab Barrow	Qatar	13.33	QH3, PB
2	1	6	Addis Wong Lok Hei	Hong Kong	13.74	QH3, PB
3	2	3	Abderrazzak Mouzdahir	Morocco	13.76	QH3, PB
4	2	5	Kenny Fletcher	France	13.76	QH3
5	3	3	Marcos Paulo Leal Ferreira	Brazil	13.77	QH3
6	1	7	Nick Rüegg	Switzerland	13.81	QH3
7	2	6	Jakub Czak	Poland	13.86	QH3, PB
8	2	7	Victor Steiner	El Salvador	13.86	QH3, PB
9	3	8	Serhat Bulut	Turkey	13.94	QH2
10	2	4	Ioannis Kamarinos	Greece	13.99	QH2
11	3	4	Adam Exley	Canada	14.13	QH2
12	1	4	Jiří Pechar	Czech Republic	14.16	QH2
13	1	3	Martín Sáenz	Chile	14.17	QH2
14	1	5	Francisco Diaz	Venezuela	14.40	QH1
15	3	6	Jesus Manuel Macho Alvidrez	Mexico	14.46	QH1
16	1	8	Mohamed Zadi	Algeria	14.46	QH1
17	3	7	Dovidas Petkevičius	Lithuania	14.56	QH1
18	2	8	Sione Tuihalamaka	Tonga	16.15	QH1

=== Stage 2 ===
Rank	Heat	Lane	Athlete	Nation	Result	Notes
1	3	6	Owaab Barrow	Qatar	13.17	PB
2	3	5	Kenny Fletcher	France	13.25	PB
3	3	3	Addis Wong Lok Hei	Hong Kong	13.39	PB
4	3	4	Abderrazzak Mouzdahir	Morocco	13.57	PB
5	3	8	Marcos Paulo Leal Ferreira	Brazil	13.62	PB
6	3	2	Victor Steiner	El Salvador	13.63	PB
7	3	7	Jakub Czak	Poland	13.72	PB
8	2	4	Serhat Bulut	Turkey	13.78	PB
9	2	6	Ioannis Kamarinos	Greece	13.80	
10	2	3	Jiří Pechar	Czech Republic	13.95	
11	2	7	Martín Sáenz	Chile	14.00	
12	3	7	Nick Rüegg	Switzerland	14.01	
13	2	5	Adam Exley	Canada	14.13	
14	1	4	Jesus Manuel Macho Alvidrez	Mexico	14.40	
15	1	6	Mohamed Zadi	Algeria	14.50	
16	1	3	Dovidas Petkevičius	Lithuania	14.72	
	1	5	Francisco Diaz	Venezuela	DQ	R 162.8
	1	7	Sione Tuihalamaka	Tonga	DNS	

=== Final placing ===
Rank	Athlete	Nation	Stage 1	Stage 2	Total
1st place, gold medalist(s)	Owaab Barrow	Qatar	13.33	13.17	26.50
2nd place, silver medalist(s)	Kenny Fletcher	France	13.76	13.25	27.01
3rd place, bronze medalist(s)	Addis Wong Lok Hei	Hong Kong	13.74	13.39	27.13
4	Abderrazzak Mouzdahir	Morocco	13.76	13.57	27.33
5	Marcos Paulo Leal Ferreira	Brazil	13.77	13.62	27.39
6	Victor Steiner	El Salvador	13.86	13.63	27.49
7	Jakub Czak	Poland	13.86	13.72	27.58
8	Serhat Bulut	Turkey	13.94	13.78	27.72
9	Ioannis Kamarinos	Greece	13.99	13.80	27.79
10	Nick Rüegg	Switzerland	13.81	14.01	27.82
11	Jiří Pechar	Czech Republic	14.16	13.95	28.11
12	Martín Sáenz	Chile	14.17	14.00	28.17
13	Adam Exley	Canada	14.13	14.13	28.26
14	Jesus Manuel Macho Alvidrez	Mexico	14.46	14.40	28.86
15	Mohamed Zadi	Algeria	14.46	14.50	28.96
16	Dovidas Petkevičius	Lithuania	14.56	14.72	29.28
	Francisco Diaz	Venezuela	14.40	DQ	
	Sione Tuihalamaka	Tonga	16.15	DNS	
