= Fencing at the 2018 Summer Youth Olympics – Boys' foil =

Boys' foil at the III Summer Youth Olympic Games
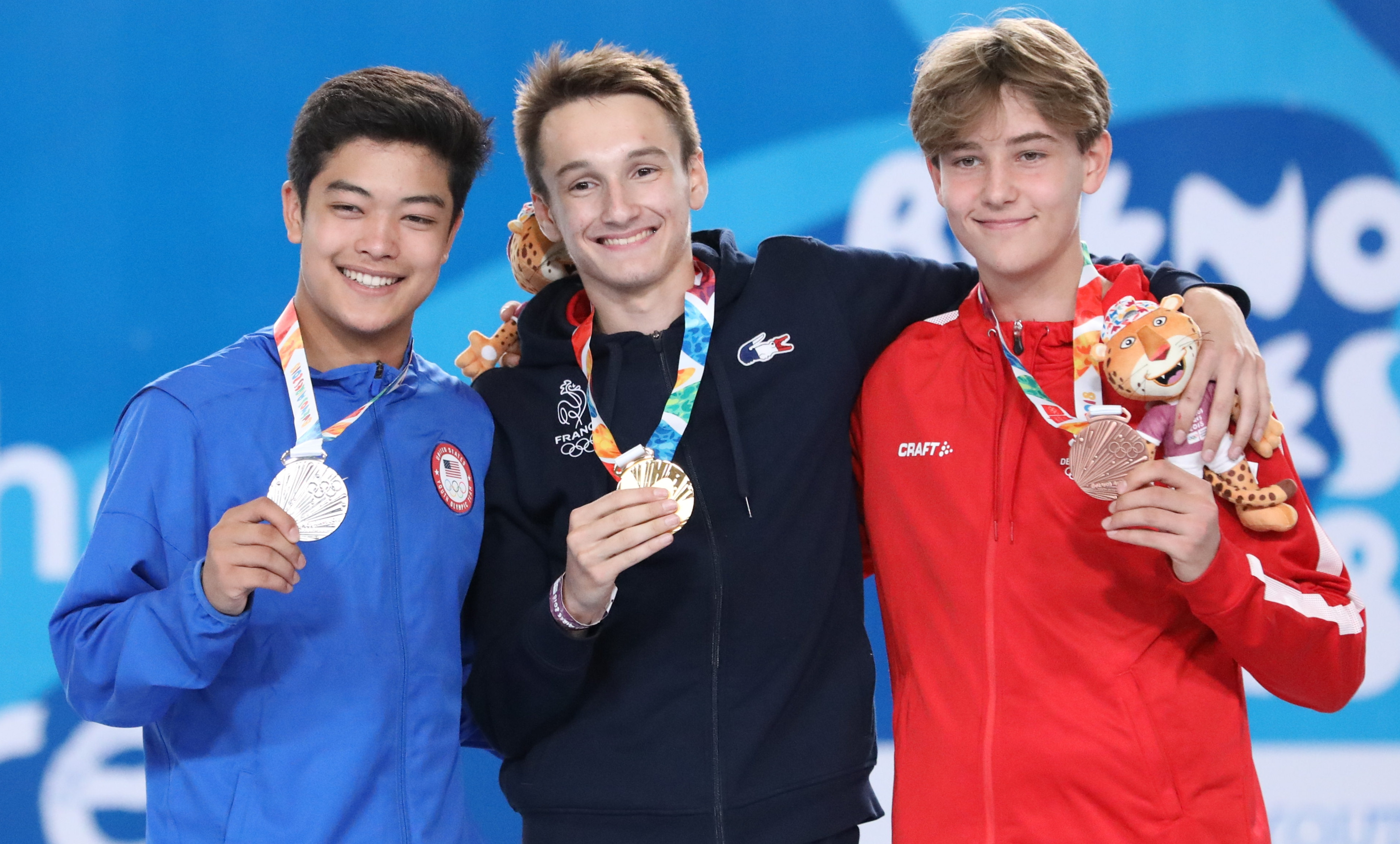
- The medailists: Kenji Bravo, Armand Spichiger and Jonas Winterberg-Poulsen
- Venue: Africa Pavilion
- Dates: 9 October
- Competitors: 13 from 13 nations

Medalists
1st place, gold medalist(s)		Armand Spichiger; France
2nd place, silver medalist(s)		Kenji Bravo; United States
3rd place, bronze medalist(s)		Jonas Winterberg-Poulsen; Denmark

The boys' foil competition at the 2018 Summer Youth Olympics was held at the Africa Pavilion in Argentina on 9 October.

== Results ==
=== Pool Round ===
==== Pool 1 ====
Rank	Athlete	(United States)	(Chinese Taipei)	(France)	(Portugal)	(Italy)	(Australia)	(Philippines)	V#	B#	Ind.	HG	HR	Diff.
1	Kenji Bravo (USA)		V	3	V	V	V	V	5	6	0.833	28	16	+12
2	Chen Yi-tung (TPE)	3		V	V	4	V	V	4	6	0.667	27	19	+8
4	Armand Spichiger (FRA)	V	1		V	2	V	V	4	6	0.667	23	18	+5
6	António Charréu (POR)	4	3	2		2	2	V	1	6	0.167	18	28	−10
3	Filippo Macchi (ITA)	2	V	V	V		V	4	4	6	0.667	26	19	+7
7	Robert Ciccarelli (AUS)	2	4	1	V	1		1	1	6	0.167	14	27	−13
5	Lawrence Everett Tan (PHI)	0	1	2	3	V	V		2	6	0.333	16	25	−9

==== Pool 2 ====
Rank	Athlete	(Mexico)	(Denmark)	(Egypt)	(Singapore)	(Poland)	(Hong Kong)	V#	B#	Ind.	HG	HR	Diff.
1	Diego Cervantes (MEX)		V	V	V	V	V	5	5	1.000	25	15	+10
2	Jonas Winterberg-Poulsen (DEN)	4		V	4	V	V	3	5	0.600	23	16	+7
6	Loaay Marouf (EGY)	1	0		2	4	2	0	5	0.000	9	25	−16
4	Matthew Lim (SGP)	4	V	V		1	4	2	5	0.400	19	21	−2
5	Maciej Bem (POL)	3	2	V	V		1	2	5	0.400	16	20	−4
3	Chan Pak Hei (HKG)	3	4	V	V	V		3	5	0.600	22	17	+5

=== Bracket ===
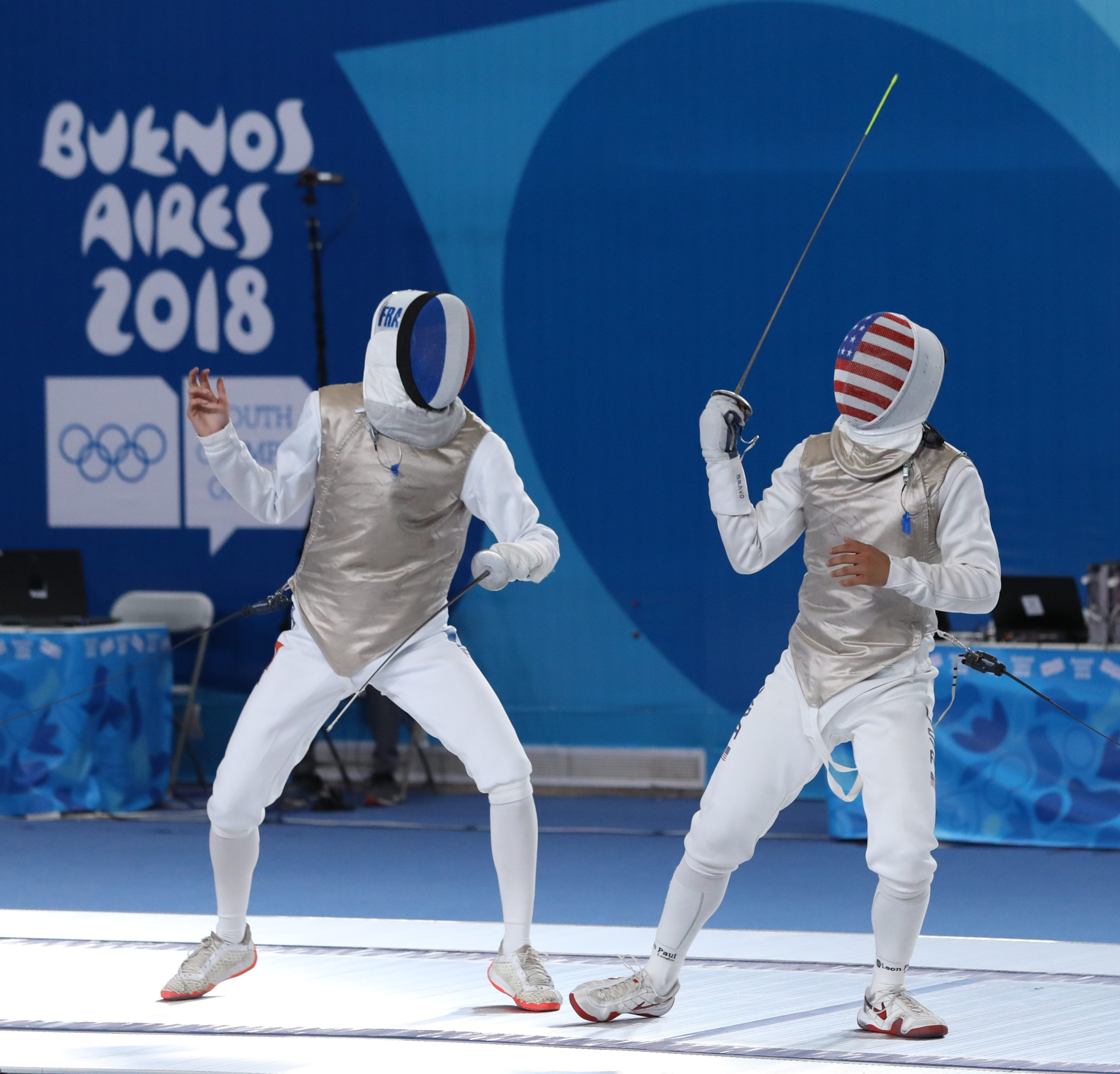
Final: Armand Spichiger vs. Kenji Bravo

Round of 16
1
16
9	Maciej Bem (POL)	15
8	Matthew Lim (SGP)	3
5	Armand Spichiger (FRA)	15
12	Robert Ciccarelli (AUS)	6
13	Loaay Marouf (EGY)	9
4	Filippo Macchi (ITA)	15
3
14
11	António Charréu (POR)	9
6	Jonas Winterberg-Poulsen (DEN)	15
7	Chan Pak Hei (HKG)	15
10	Lawrence Everett Tan (PHI)	11
15
2

Quarterfinals
1	Diego Cervantes (MEX)	12
9	Maciej Bem (POL)	15
5	Armand Spichiger (FRA)	15
4	Filippo Macchi (ITA)	8
3	Chen Yi-tung (TPE)	10
6	Jonas Winterberg-Poulsen (DEN)	15
7	Chan Pak Hei (HKG)	7
2	Kenji Bravo (USA)	15

Semifinals
9	Maciej Bem (POL)	8
5	Armand Spichiger (FRA)	15
6	Jonas Winterberg-Poulsen (DEN)	13
2	Kenji Bravo (USA)	15

Final
5	Armand Spichiger (FRA)	15
2	Kenji Bravo (USA)	7
Third place
9	Maciej Bem (POL)	13
6	Jonas Winterberg-Poulsen (DEN)	15

== Final standings ==
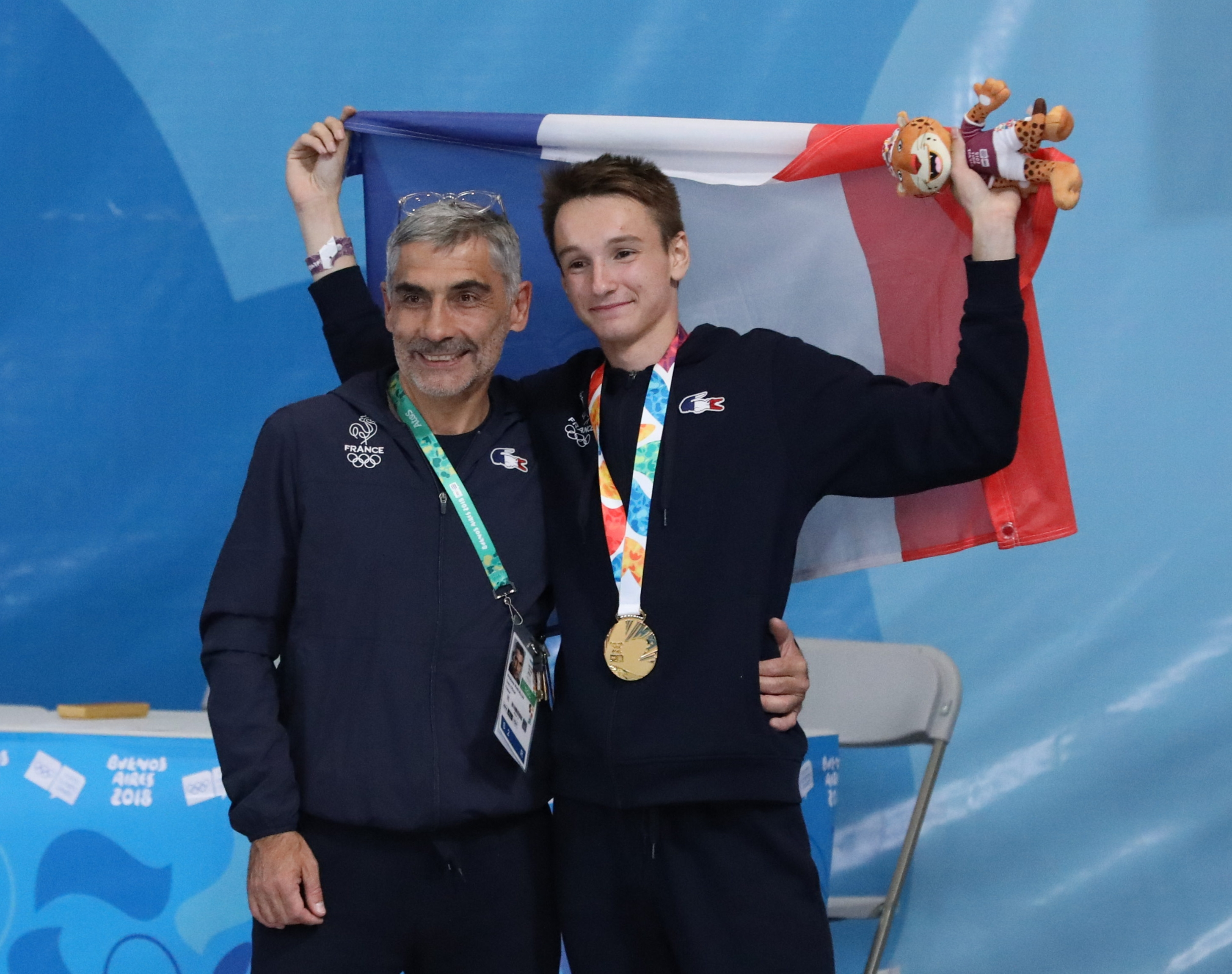
Armand Spichiger, Youth Olympic Games Champion, and his trainer

Rank	Athlete
1st place, gold medalist(s)	Armand Spichiger (FRA)
2nd place, silver medalist(s)	Kenji Bravo (USA)
3rd place, bronze medalist(s)	Jonas Winterberg-Poulsen (DEN)
4	Maciej Bem (POL)
5	Diego Cervantes (MEX)
6	Chen Yi-tung (TPE)
7	Filippo Macchi (ITA)
8	Chan Pak Hei (HKG)
9	Matthew Lim (SGP)
10	Lawrence Everett Tan (PHI)
11	António Charréu (POR)
12	Robert Ciccarelli (AUS)
13	Loaay Marouf (EGY)
