= 2017 Youth Sailing World Championships – Girl's 29er =

Girl's 29er at the 2017 Youth Sailing World Championships
- Venue: Sanya, China
- Dates: 9–16 December
- Competitors: 40 from 20 nations

Medalists
gold medal	Margherita Porro; Sofia Leoni	Italy
silver medal	Zoya Novikova; Diana Sabirova	Russia
bronze medal	Jasmin May Galbraith; Chloe Fisher	Australia

The girl's 29er competition at the 2017 Youth Sailing World Championships took place between 9 and 16 December. 40 sailors from 20 nations were due to compete. Margherita Porro and Sofia Leoni of the Italy won the event.

== Results ==
Pos	Helm	Crew	Country	R1	R2	R3	R4	R5	R6	R7	R8	R9	R10	R11	R12	R13	Total	Nett
1	Margherita Porro	Sofia Leoni	Italy	1	1	1	8	1	8	3	5	2	7	3	(10)	5	55	45
2	Zoya Novikova	Diana Sabirova	Russia	2	2	12	1	(17)	2	10	11	13	10	5	5	2	92	75
3	Jasmin May Galbraith	Chloe Fisher	Australia	9	11	10	(21 UFD)	5	17	2	6	4	2	1	3	6	97	76
4	Maiwenn Jacquin	Enora Percheron	France	4	10	2	7	2	10	11	9	8	4	9	1	(14)	91	77
5	Maru Scheel	Freya Feilcke	Germany	5	8	6	11	3	(14)	5	13	7	6	6	7	4	95	81
6	Isabelle Fellows	Anna Sturrock	United Kingdom	8	7	11	12	8	(15)	9	2	1	3	11	4	7	98	83
7	Ismene Usman	Svea Karsenbarg	Netherlands	11	6	8	3	(14)	9	1	4	6	11	13	2	10	98	84
8	Ronja Gronblom	Sara Ehrnrooth	Finland	6	16	7	(21 UFD)	9	7	8	1	3	1	21 DSQ	6	1	107	86
9	Emilie Andersen	Maren Edland	Norway	7	3	4	5	4	3	12	15	(18)	9	4	12	11	107	89
10	Johanne Schmidt	Katrine Schmidt	Denmark	3	4	3	2	18	12	13	16	(19)	8	2	18	13	131	112
11	Elena de las Matas Iglesias	Sofía Izquierdo Fernandez	Spain	10	5	9	6	7	4	(21 DSQ)	12	5	12	17	15	17	140	119
12	Alice Moss	Julia Henriksson	Sweden	13	15	(17)	14	10	6	15	7	10	5	12	9	12	145	128
13	Zuzanna Walecka	Emilia Zygarlowska	Poland	(17)	14	5	4	12	11	14	10	9	15	16	8	15	150	133
14	Helena De Marchi	Nicole Buuck	Brazil	(18)	18	18	9	11	18	4	3	12	14	7	13	9	154	136
15	Crystal Sun	Olivia Hobbs	New Zealand	14	9	14	10	16	16	6	14	15	(20)	8	11	8	161	141
16	Berta Puig	Charlotte Mack	United States	16	17	16	15	6	5	(21 UFD)	8	17	17	18	14	3	173	152
17	Sarah Hardee	Lucy Klempen	United States Virgin Islands	12	12	15	(21 DNF)	13	13	7	17	14	19	10	20	16	189	168
18	Ines Billoch	Teresa Romairone	Argentina	15	13	13	13	21 DNE	1	16	20	16	13	14	16	(21 DNF)	192	171
19	Candelaria Gari	Cecilia Coll	Uruguay	20	19	20	(21 UFD)	15	19	18	19	11	16	15	17	18	228	207
20	Xiaoming Qiu	Xuebin Yu	China	19	(20)	19	16	19	20	17	18	20	18	19	19	19	243	223
