= Rowing at the 2018 Summer Youth Olympics =

Rowing at the III Summer Youth Olympic Games
- Venue: Dock 3, Puerto Madero
- Dates: 7–10 October
- No. of events: 4 (2 boys, 2 girls)

Rowing at the 2018 Summer Youth Olympics was held from 7 to 10 October. The events took place at the Puerto Madero in Buenos Aires, Argentina, being raced unusual to rowing events in a short sprint over a 500 metre 4 lane course, under the Puente de la Mujer. Racing started with a time trial of 900m + turn (out, round a buoy, and back) to allocate crews to heats. There were two rounds of heats with crews being awarded points based on their ranking in each heat and the accumulated points from the two heats determining progression to the quarter-finals of the singles and semi-finals of the pairs.

== Qualification ==
Six qualification events were held to determine the representation for the 2018 Youth Olympics, the 2017 World Junior Championships and five continental qualifiers. Each National Olympic Committee (NOC) can enter a maximum of 2 boats, 1 per each gender. Should Argentina not qualify any boats they would be given a boat in single sculls for each gender. As Argentina qualified two boats the host quota was reallocated to the American Qualification Regatta. In addition four athlete quotas, two from each gender will be decided by the Tripartite Commission.

To be eligible to participate at the Youth Olympics athletes must have been born between 1 January 2000 and 31 December 2001. Should a NOC qualify two boats from the same gender the boat with the higher ranking will be qualified and the next highest ranked NOC will qualify.

=== Single Sculls ===
Event	Location	Date	Total Places	Qualified Boys	Qualified Girls
Host Nation	–	–	0	~~Argentina~~	~~Argentina~~
2017 World Championships	(Lithuania) Trakai	2–6 August 2017	8	United States; Australia; Switzerland; Belarus; South Africa; Denmark; Greece; Norway	Spain; Great Britain; South Africa; Germany; France; Belgium; Sweden; Canada
Asian Qualification Regatta	Singapore	11–14 October 2017	3	China; Japan; Hong Kong	Chinese Taipei; Iran; Uzbekistan
Oceania Qualification Regatta	(Vanuatu) Port Vila	22–23 January 2018	1	Kiribati	Australia
Americas Qualification Regatta	(Chile) Curauma, Valparaíso	10–12 April 2018	4	Peru; Cuba; Uruguay; Brazil	Argentina; Mexico; Guatemala; Cuba
2018 European Championships	(France) Gravelines	26–27 May 2018	3	Czech Republic; Moldova; Ukraine	Switzerland; Slovenia; Estonia
2018 African Youth Games	(Algeria) Algiers	19–21 July 2018	3	Zimbabwe; Tunisia; Egypt	Algeria; Zimbabwe; Tunisia
Tripartite Invitation	–	–	2	Nicaragua; Saint Vincent and the Grenadines	Uganda; Lebanon
Reallocation of Unused Quotas	–	–			
TOTAL				24	24

=== Pairs ===
Event	Location	Date	Total Places	Qualified Boys	Qualified Girls
2017 World Championships	(Lithuania) Trakai	2–6 August 2017	8	Croatia; Great Britain; Germany; Romania; Turkey; Uzbekistan; Mexico; Argentina	Croatia; Czech Republic; Greece; Lithuania; Italy; China; United States; Romania
Asian Qualification Regatta	Singapore	11–14 October 2017	1	India	Thailand
Americas Qualification Regatta	(Chile) Curauma	10–12 April 2018	1	Chile	Chile
2018 European Championships	(France) Gravelines	26–27 May 2018	1	Italy	Netherlands
2018 African Youth Games	(Algeria) Algiers	19–21 July 2018	1	Egypt	Algeria
TOTAL				12	12

== Medal summary ==
=== Medal table ===
* Host nation (Argentina)

Rank	Nation	Gold	Silver	Bronze	Total
1	Argentina*	1	0	1	2
2	Greece	1	0	0	1
2	Italy	1	0	0	1
2	Ukraine	1	0	0	1
5	Romania	0	1	1	2
6	Belarus	0	1	0	1
6	Czech Republic	0	1	0	1
6	Sweden	0	1	0	1
9	Australia	0	0	1	1
9	Estonia	0	0	1	1
Totals (10 entries)		4	4	4	12

=== Boys ===
Event	Gold	Silver	Bronze
Single sculls	Ivan Tyshchenko; Ukraine	Ivan Brynza; Belarus	Cormac Kennedy-Leverett; Australia
Coxless pair	Italy; Alberto Zamariola; Nicolas Castelnovo	Romania; Florin Nicolae Arteni-Fintinariu; Alexandru Danciu	Argentina; Felipe Modarelli; Tomas Herrera

=== Girls ===
Event	Gold	Silver	Bronze
Single sculls	Maria Sol Ordas; Argentina	Elin Lindroth; Sweden	Greta Jaanson; Estonia
Coxless pair	Greece; Maria Kyridou; Christina Bourmpou	Czech Republic; Anna Šantrůčková; Eliška Podrazilová	Romania; Tabita Maftei; Alina Maria Baletchi

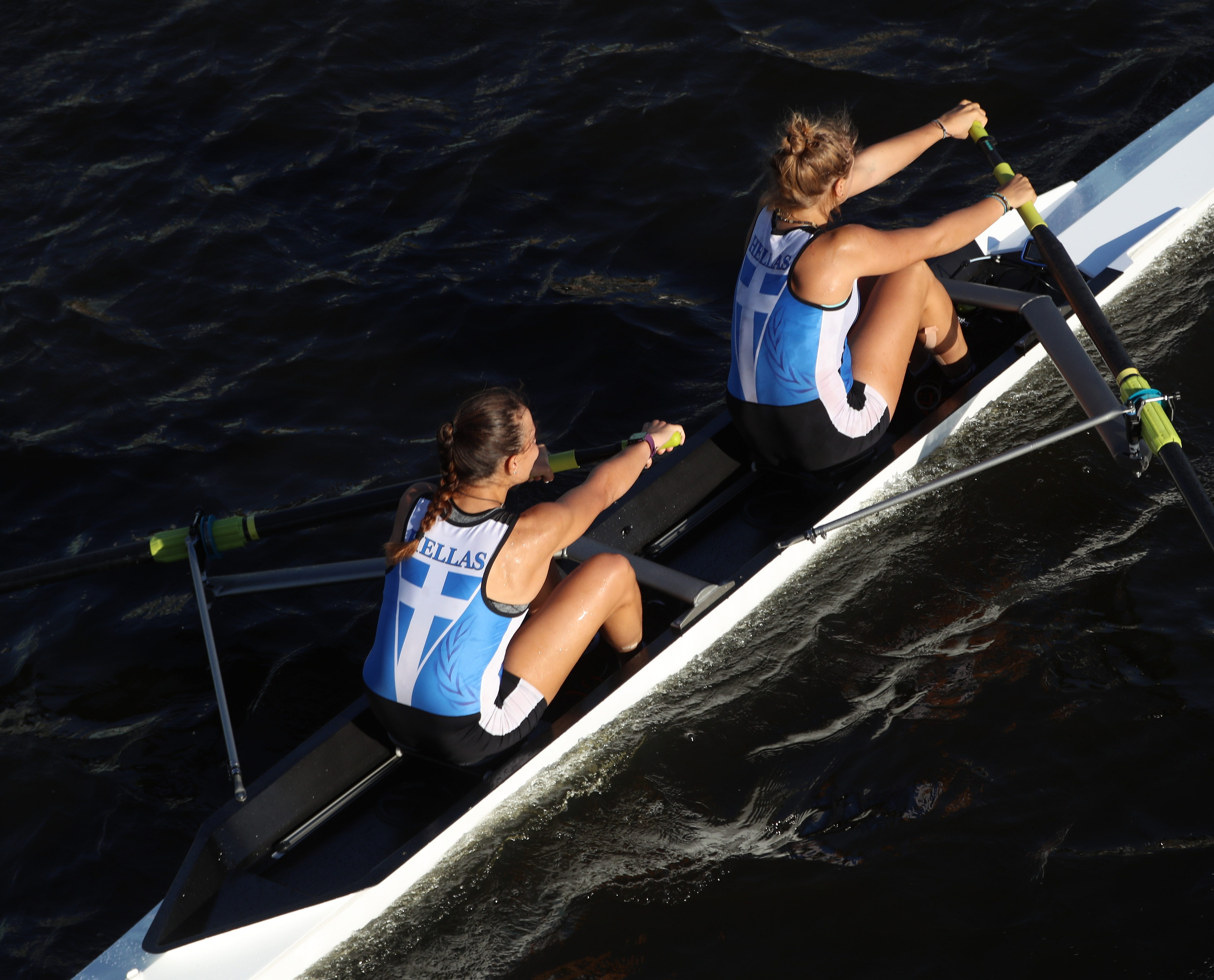
Greece: Maria Kyridou and Christina Bourmpou, Gold medal

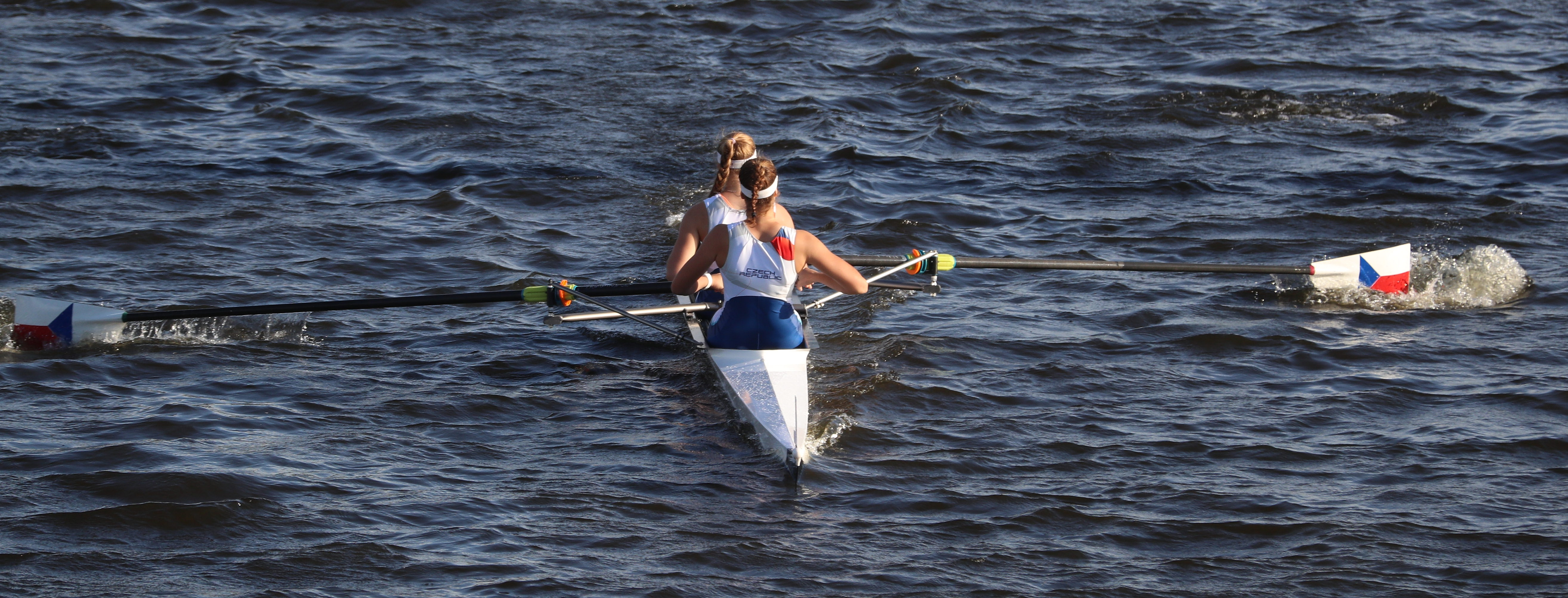
Czech Republic: Anna Šantrůčková and Eliška Podrazilová, Silver medal

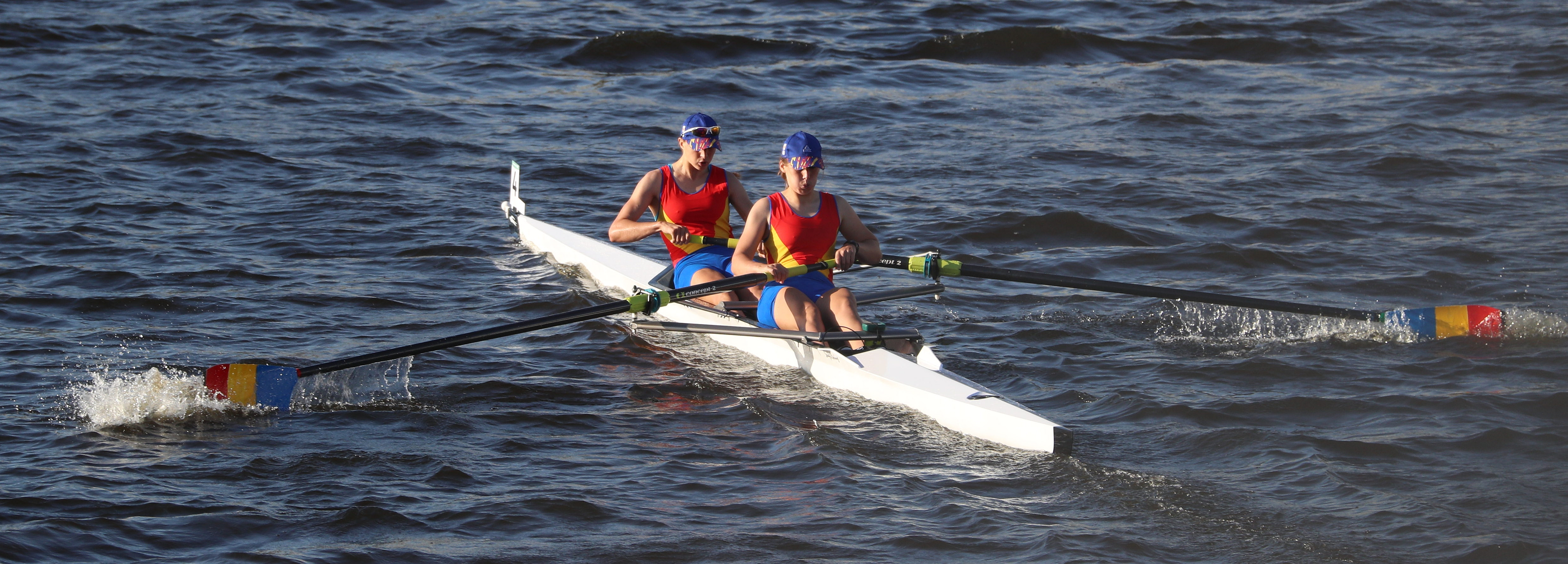
Romania: Tabita Maftei and Alina Maria Baletchi, Bronze medal

== Final results ==
=== Boys ===
==== Single sculls ====
Pos	Race	Lane	Name	Nat	Time
1	A-1	3	Ivan Tyshchenko	Ukraine	1:32.47
2	A-2	1	Ivan Brynza	Belarus	1:32.84
3	A-3	2	Cormac Kennedy-Leverett	Australia	1:33.84
4	A-4	4	Angel Sosa	Peru	1:34.15
5	B-1	3	Kai Schaetzle	Switzerland	1:37.98
6	B-2	1	Ivan Corsunov	Moldova	1:40.06
7	B-3	4	Stefanos Kapakoglou	Greece	1:41.20
8	B-4	2	Gabriel Mahler	Czech Republic	1:43.16
9	C-1	2	Xinxin Chi	China	1:38.38
10	C-2	3	Marco van Blarcum de Graaff	Brazil	1:38.38
11	C-3	4	Liam Smit	South Africa	1:40.34
12	C-4	1	Martin Gonzalez Volkman	Uruguay	1:40.44
13	D-1	3	Wai Chun Wong	Hong Kong	1:40.87
14	D-2	2	Alexei Carballosa Ramirez	Cuba	1:41.16
15	D-3	4	Shunsuke Shimada	Japan	1:43.18
16	D-4	1	Nicolai Haraldseth	Norway	1:43.87

==== Coxless pair ====
Pos	Race	Lane	Name	Nat	Time
1	A-1	2	Alberto Zamariola (bow); Nicolas Castelnovo (s)	Italy	1:30.40
2	A-2	4	Florin Arteni (bow); Alexandru-Laurentiu Danciu (s)	Romania	1:30.65
3	A-3	1	Felipe Modarelli (bow); Tomas Herrera (s)	Argentina	1:30.97
4	A-4	3	Davrjon Davronov (bow); Evgeniy Agafonov (s)	Uzbekistan	1:31.63
5	A-5	2	Michael Dalton (bow); Theodore Darlow (s)	Great Britain	1:31.89
6	A-6	3	Patrik loncaric (bow); Anton loncaric (s)	Croatia	1:32.98
7	B-1	4	Jose Nicolas Obando Huequeman (bow); Nicolas Tapia (s)	Chile	1:33.35
8	B-2	1	Satnam Singh (bow); Ashish Goliyan (s)	India	1:33.01
9	B-3	2	Emre Oguz (bow); Baris Erturk (s)	Turkey	1:33.96
10	B-4	4	Mostafa Ahmed Mohamed (bow); Omar Hamdy Ibrahim (s)	Egypt	1:34.68
11	B-5	3	Rafael Salas Martinez (bow); Juan Trejo Chavez (s)	Mexico	1:35.59
12	B-6	1	Eric Streibler (bow); Erik Kohlbach (s)	Germany	1:36.59

=== Girls ===
==== Single sculls ====
Pos	Race	Lane	Name	Nat	Time
1	A-1	3	Maria Sol Ordas	Argentina	1:43.81
2	A-2	2	Elin lindroth	Sweden	1:44.31
3	A-3	1	Greta Jaanson	Estonia	1:46.13
4	A-4	4	Luizakhon Islomova	Uzbekistan	1:51.21
5	B-1	2	Taylor McCarthy-Smith	Australia	1:46.04
6	B-2	3	Mildred Belen mercado palacios	Mexico	1:48.11
7	B-3	4	Lucine Ahyi	France	1:48.24
8	B-4	1	Marelis Gonzalez Fernandez	Cuba	1:53.01
9	C-1	3	Georgina Robinson Ranger	Great Britain	1:47.32
10	C-2	4	Caitlin Govaert	Belgium	1:49.33
11	C-3	2	Ilaria Macchi	Slovenia	1:49.85
12	C-4	1	Grace Vandenbroek	Canada	1:52.30
13	D-1	3	Tabea Kuhnert	Germany	1:50.11
14	D-2	1	Jana Nussbaumer	Switzerland	1:51.54
15	D-3	2	Katherine Williams	South Africa	1:52.73
16	D-4	4	Aina Prats Turro	Spain	1:53.11

==== Coxless pair ====
Pos	Race	Lane	Name	Nat	Time
1	A-1	3	Maria Kyridou (bow); Christina Ioanna Bourmpou (s)	Greece	1:40.00
2	A-2	2	Anna Santruckova (bow); Eliska Podrazilova (s)	Czech Republic	1:40.09
3	A-3	4	Tabita Maftei (bow); Alina-Maria Baletchi (s)	Romania	1:40.29
4	A-4	1	Dan Li (bow); Hongjing Sun (s)	China	1:45.85
5	A-5	4	Khadija Alajdi El Idrissi (bow); Vittoria Tonoli (s)	Italy	1:41.47
6	A-6	3	Vytaute Urbonaite (bow); Kamile Kralikaite (s)	Lithuania	1:42.13
7	B-1	2	Iris Klok (bow); Jessy Vermeer (s)	Netherlands	1:44.36
8	B-2	1	Aria Cvitanovic (bow); Izabela Krakic (s)	Croatia	1:45.57
9	B-3	2	Cristina Hostetter Wells (bow); Isidora Niemeyer (s)	Chile	1:45.07
10	B-4	3	Kaitlin Knifton (bow); Catherine Garrett (s)	United States	1:46.72
11	B-5	4	Premruethai Hongseethong (bow); Nuntida Krajangjam (s)	Thailand	1:49.85
12	B-6	1	Nihed Benchadli (bow); Rahma Amira Sebbouh (s)	Algeria	1:52.54
