= 2018 Youth Sailing World Championships =

Event title
- Edition: 48th

Event details
- Venue: Corpus Christi, Texas, USA
- Dates: 14 - 21 July 2018

The 2018 ISAF Youth Sailing World Championships took place in Corpus Christi, Texas, USA from July 14 to 21 2018. It was the 48th edition of the ISAF Youth Sailing World Championships.

== Competition format ==
=== Events and equipment ===
| Event | Equipment |
|---|---|
| Men's dinghy (single hander) | Laser Radial |
| Men's dinghy (double hander) | 420 |
| Men's skiff | 29er |
| Men's windsurfer | RS:X |
| Women's dinghy (single hander) | Laser Radial |
| Women's dinghy (double hander) | 420 |
| Women's skiff | 29er |
| Women's windsurfer | RS:X |
| Mixed Multihull | Nacra 15 |

== Summary ==
=== Medal table ===
* Host nation (United States)

| Rank | Nation | Gold | Silver | Bronze | Total |
|---|---|---|---|---|---|
| 1 | United States* | 4 | 1 | 0 | 5 |
| 2 | Norway | 2 | 0 | 0 | 2 |
| 3 | New Zealand | 1 | 2 | 1 | 4 |
| 4 | Argentina | 1 | 1 | 0 | 2 |
| 4 | Great Britain | 1 | 1 | 0 | 2 |
| 6 | Australia | 0 | 2 | 2 | 4 |
| 7 | Italy | 0 | 1 | 1 | 2 |
| 8 | Netherlands | 0 | 1 | 0 | 1 |
| 9 | France | 0 | 0 | 2 | 2 |
| 9 | Russia | 0 | 0 | 2 | 2 |
| 11 | Poland | 0 | 0 | 1 | 1 |
| Totals (11 entries) | | 9 | 9 | 9 | 27 |

=== Event medalists ===
==== Men's events ====
| Event | First | Second | Third |
|---|---|---|---|
| Laser Radial | Josh Armit; New Zealand | Juan Cardozo; Argentina | Zac Littlewood; Australia |
| 420 | Joseph Hermus; Walter Henry; United States | Otto Henry; Rome Featherstone; Australia | Kacper Paszek; Bartek Reiter; Poland |
| 29er | Mathias Berthet; Alexander Franks-Penty; Norway | Seb Lardies; Scott Mckenzie; New Zealand | Henry Larkings; Miles Davey; Australia |
| RS:X | Geronimo Nores; United States | Nicolo Renna; Italy | Fabien Pianazza; France |

==== Women's events ====
| Event | First | Second | Third |
|---|---|---|---|
| Laser Radial | Charlotte Rose; United States | Emma Savelon; Netherlands | Valeriya Lomatchenko; Russia |
| 420 | Carmen Cowles; Emma Cowles; United States | Vita Heathcote; Emilia Boyle; Great Britain | Violette Dorange; Camille Orion; France |
| 29er | Pia Andersen; Nora Edland; Norway | Berta Puig; Isabella Casaretto; United States | Zoya Novikova; Diana Sabirova; Russia |
| RS:X | Islay Watson; Great Britain | Veerle ten Have; New Zealand | Giorgia Speciale; Italy |

==== Mixed events ====
| Event | First | Second | Third |
|---|---|---|---|
| Nacra 15 | Teresa Romairone; Dante Cittadini; Argentina | Andrea Spagnolli; Giulia Fava; Australia | Greta Stewart; Tom Fyfe; New Zealand |
