= RYA Youth National Championships 2018 =

2018 RYA Youth National Championships 2018
Event details
- Venue: Largs, Scotland
- Dates: 2–6 April

Competitors
- Competitors: 233

The 2018 edition of the annual Royal Yachting Association Youth National Championships is set to be held at Largs Sailing Club in Largs, Scotland, with racing taking place between 2 April and 6 April. The contestants will compete for the RYA Youth National title in their class, with the winners representing Great Britain at the Youth Sailing World Championships 2018 in Corpus Christi, Texas in the US in July.

== Equipment ==
Class	Boats
Laser Standard	14
Laser Radial Boys	48
Laser Radial Girls	19
420 Boys	11
420 Girls	13
420 Mixed	6
29er Boys	21
29er Girls	13
29er Mixed	4
Nacra 15 Open	8

== Men's events ==
Event	Gold	Silver	Bronze
Laser Standard	Joseph Mullan (England)	Jamie Calder (Scotland)	Jake Farren-Price (England)
Laser Radial	Jake Bowhay (England)	Tom Renny (Wales)	Arthur Fry (England)
420	Rhys Lewis (Wales); Drew Wright (Wales)	Jack Lewis (England); Charlie Bacon (England)	Callum Bell (Scotland); Josh Hale (Scotland)
29er	Ewan Wilson (Scotland); Finley Armstrong (England)	James Hammett (England); Piers Nicholls (England)	Freddie Peters (England); Elliott Wells (England)

== Women's events ==
Event	Gold	Silver	Bronze
Laser Radial	Chloe Barr (England)	Daisy Collingridge (England)	Iona Dixon (Wales)
420	Vita Heathcote (England); Milly Boyle (England)	Megan Ferguson (England); Bettine Harris (England)	Charlotte Boyle (England); Georgia Baker (England)
29er	Bella Fellow (England); Anna Sturrock (Scotland)	Hannah Bristow (England); Jessica Jobson (England)	Freya Black (England); Millie Aldridge (England)

== Open events ==
Event	Gold	Silver	Bronze
Nacra 15	William Smith (England); Abigail Clarke (England)	Morgan Smith (England); Molly Desorgher (England)	Theo Williams (England); Jazz Williams (England)
