= Greece at the 2018 Summer Youth Olympics =

- IOC code: GRE
- NOC: Hellenic Olympic Committee
- Website: http://www.hoc.gr/

in Buenos Aires, Argentina 6 – 18 October 2018
- Competitors: 33 in 10 sports
- Flag bearer: Christina Bourmpou
- Medals Ranked 24th: Gold 3 Silver 1 Bronze 2 Total 6

Summer Youth Olympics appearances
- 2010; 2014; 2018; 2026

Greece participated at the 2018 Summer Youth Olympics in Buenos Aires, Argentina from 6 October to 18 October 2018.

== Medalists ==
Medals awarded to participants of mixed-NOC (Combined) teams are represented in italics. These medals are not counted towards the individual NOC medal tally.

Medal	Name	Sport	Event	Date
Gold	Maria Kyridou; Christina Bourmpou	Rowing	Girls' Pairs	9 October
Gold	Alexandros Kalpogiannakis	Sailing	Boys' Techno 293	12 October
Gold	Elina Tzengko	Athletics	Javelin throw	16 October
* Gold	Astyeli Brokkan	Mountain Biking	Short Track Mountain Biking	15 August 2016
Silver	Savvas Thomoglou	Swimming	200 m breaststroke	10 October
Bronze	Fani Tzeli	Taekwondo	55 kg	9 October
Bronze	Olga Fiaska	Athletics	5 km walk	16 October
Bronze	Antonia Sakellaridou	Gymnastics	Mixed multi-discipline team	10 October

- Short Track Cross-Country Event was held at the 2016 Rio Olympics as part of a multi-national exposition event

== Athletics ==
Boys
Track & road events

Athlete	Event	Heats				Total	Rank
Athlete	Event	Stage 1		Stage 2		Total	Rank
Athlete	Event	Result	Rank	Result	Rank	Total	Rank
Ioannis Kamarinos	110 m hurdles	13.99	10	13.80	9	27.79	9
Anthimos Kelepouris	5 km walk	21:58.74	11	22:42.50	10	44:41.24	8

Field Events

Athlete	Event	Stage 1		Stage 2		Total	Rank
Athlete	Event	Distance	Rank	Distance	Rank	Total	Rank
Gerasimos Kalogerakis	Javelin throw	66.44	12	63.56	16	130.00	13
Antonis Santas	Pole vault	4.85	7	4.82	6	9.67	6
Theodoros Ziogas	Hammer throw	69.74	10	69.65	8	139.39	9

Girls
Track & road events

Athlete	Event	Heats				Total	Final	
Athlete	Event	Stage 1		Stage 2		Total	Result	Rank
Athlete	Event	Result	Rank	Result	Rank	Total	Result	Rank
Eleni Ioannidou	800 m	2:14.43	13	2:14.22	14	4:28.65	—N/a	12
Vasileia Spyrou	3000 m	9:49.87	11	CCR	13 (35)	—N/a		12
Vasileia Spyrou	Cross country	—N/a					14.31	35
Olga Fiaska	5 km walk	22:46.13 PB	3	23:23.89	2	46:10.02	—N/a	3rd place, bronze medalist(s)

Field events

Athlete	Event	Stage 1		Stage 2		Total	Rank
Athlete	Event	Distance	Position	Distance	Position	Total	Rank
Panagiota Dosi	High jump	1.74	7	1.79	8	3.53	7
Spyridoula Karydi	Triple jump	12.75	7	12.84	5	25.59	6
Sofia Kessidi	Discus throw	49.14 PB	6	48.38	6	97.52	6
Stavroula Kosmidou	Hammer throw	64.65	4	58.68	9	123.33	8
Elina Tzengko	Javelin throw	63.34 PB OR	1	61.74	1	125.08	1st place, gold medalist(s)

== Diving ==
Individual

Athlete	Event	Preliminary		Final	
Athlete	Event	Points	Rank	Points	Rank
Nikolaos Molvalis	Boys' 10 m platform	445.30	9	460.95	7

Team

Athlete	Event	Preliminary		Final	
Athlete	Event	Points	Rank	Points	Rank
Nikolaos Molvalis (GRE); Kimberly Bong Qian Ping (MAS)	Mixed Team	—N/a		347.10	4

== Gymnastics ==
=== Artistic Gymnastics ===
Individual

Athlete	Event	Qualification						Final					
Athlete	Event	V	UB	BB	F	Total	Rank	V	UB	BB	F	Total	Rank
Elvira Katsali	All-Around	12.333	10.133	10.133	10.933	43.532	30	Did not advance					

=== Rhythmic gymnastics ===
Individual

Athlete	Event	Qualification						Final					
Athlete	Event	Hoop	Ball	Clubs	Ribbon	Total	Rank	Hoop	Ball	Clubs	Ribbon	Total	Rank
Ioanna Magopoulou	Individual	14.100	15.400	15.450	10.750	55.700	14	Did not advance					

=== Trampoline ===
Athlete	Event	Qualification				Final	
Athlete	Event	Routine 1	Routine 2	Total	Rank	Score	Rank
Antonia Sakellaridou	Girls	41.490	49.825	91.315	9	Did not advance	

=== Mixed events ===
Athlete	Event	Final	
Athlete	Event	Total points	Rank
Viktoryia Akhotnikava (BLR); Ilya Famenkou (BLR); Brandon Briones (USA); Adam Tobin (GBR); Mohamed Afify (EGY); Indira Ulmasova (UZB); Karla Perez (GUA); Tonya Paulsson (SWE); Lidiia Iakovleva (AUS); Aino Yamada (JPN); Lilly Rotaermel (GER); Santiago Escallier (ARG); Antonia Sakellaridou (GRE)	Mixed multi-discipline team	352	3rd place, bronze medalist(s)

== Karate ==
Girls

Athlete	Event	Pool Matches				Semifinal	Final / BM	
Athlete	Event	Opposition Score	Opposition Score	Opposition Score	Rank	Opposition Score	Opposition Score	Rank
Kyriaki Kydonaki	Kumite +59kg	Salisbury (GBR); W 4-2	Sælid (NOR); L 0-1	Alameri (UAE); L 0-4	4	Did not advance		

== Rowing ==
Boys

Athlete	Event	Round 1		Round 2 Heats			Round 3 Heats			Total time	Total points	Rank	Quarterfinal		Semifinal		Final	
Athlete	Event	Time	Rank	Time	Rank	Points	Time	Rank	Points	Total time	Total points	Rank	Time	Rank	Time	Rank	Time	Rank
Stefanos Kapakoglou	Boys' Single Sculls	4:23.09	23	1:44.09	3	3	1:40.23	2	4	3:24.32	7	9 Q	1:38.38	2 QSA/B	1:40.51	4 QFB	1:41.20	7

Girls

Athlete	Event	Round 1		Round 2 Heats			Round 3 Heats			Total time	Total points	Rank	Semifinal		Final	
Athlete	Event	Time	Rank	Time	Rank	Points	Time	Rank	Points	Total time	Total points	Rank	Time	Rank	Time	Rank
Maria Kyridou; Christina Bourmpou	Girls' Pairs	3:43.67	2	1:45.80	2	4	1:47.19	1	8	3:32.99	12	2 Q	1:39.43	1 QFA	1:40.00	1st place, gold medalist(s)

Qualification Legend: FA=Final A (medal); FB=Final B (non-medal); FC=Final C (non-medal); FD=Final D (non-medal); SA/B=Semifinals A/B; SC/D=Semifinals C/D; R=Repechage

== Sailing ==
Boys

Athlete	Event	Race													Net Points	Final Rank
Athlete	Event	1	2	3	4	5	6	7	8	9	10	11	12	M*	Net Points	Final Rank
Alexandros Kalpogiannakis	Boys' Techno 293	1	1	2	~~13~~	C	1	2	3	2	1	1	2	7	23	1st place, gold medalist(s)

Girls

Athlete	Event	Race													Net Points	Final Rank
Athlete	Event	1	2	3	4	5	6	7	8	9	10	11	12	M*	Net Points	Final Rank
Katerina Divari	Girls' Techno 293	12	12	6	6	C	~~14~~	6	3	1	5	13	5	4	73	5

== Swimming ==
Boys

Athlete	Event	Heat		Semifinal		Final	
Athlete	Event	Time	Rank	Time	Rank	Time	Rank
Andreas Georgakopoulos	400 m freestyle	3:56.37	16	—N/a		Did not advance	
Andreas Georgakopoulos	800 m freestyle	8:14.71	17	—N/a		Did not advance	
Savvas Thomoglou	200 m breaststroke	2:14.94 PB	2 Q	—N/a		2:13.62 PB	2nd place, silver medalist(s)

Girls

Athlete	Event	Heat		Semifinal		Final	
Athlete	Event	Time	Rank	Time	Rank	Time	Rank
Nikoletta Pavlopoulou	200 m individual medley	2:17.35	9	—N/a		Did not advance	
Nikoletta Pavlopoulou	200 m breaststroke	2:32.61	14	—N/a		Did not advance	
Eleni Kontogeorgou	200 m breaststroke	2:32.38	12	—N/a		Did not advance	

== Table tennis ==
Greece qualified one table tennis player based on its performance at the European Continental Qualifier.

Singles

Athlete	Event	Group stage	Rank	Round of 16	Quarterfinals	Semifinals	Final / BM	Rank
Athlete	Event	Opposition Score	Rank	Opposition Score	Opposition Score	Opposition Score	Opposition Score	Rank
Ioannis Sgouropoulos	Boys	Group H Meissnek (GER); W 4–2	1 Q	Rembert (FRA); W 4–2	Lin (TPE); L 1–4	Did not advance		5
Ioannis Sgouropoulos	Boys	Pang (SGP); W 4–1	1 Q	Rembert (FRA); W 4–2	Lin (TPE); L 1–4	Did not advance		5
Ioannis Sgouropoulos	Boys	Solanke (NGR); W 4–0	1 Q	Rembert (FRA); W 4–2	Lin (TPE); L 1–4	Did not advance		5

Team

Athletes	Event	Group stage	Rank	Round of 16	Quarterfinals	Semifinals	Final / BM	Rank
Athletes	Event	Opposition Score	Rank	Opposition Score	Opposition Score	Opposition Score	Opposition Score	Rank
Europe 3 Ioannis Sgouropoulos (GRE); Nadezhda Bogdanova (BLR)	Mixed	Intercontinental 2 (MIX); W 3–0	2 Q	Japan (JPN); L 0–2	Did not advance			9
Europe 3 Ioannis Sgouropoulos (GRE); Nadezhda Bogdanova (BLR)	Mixed	Chinese Taipei (TPE); L 1–2	2 Q	Japan (JPN); L 0–2	Did not advance			9
Europe 3 Ioannis Sgouropoulos (GRE); Nadezhda Bogdanova (BLR)	Mixed	Intercontinental 1 (MIX); W 3–0	2 Q	Japan (JPN); L 0–2	Did not advance			9

== Taekwondo ==
Boys

Athlete	Event	Round of 16	Quarterfinals	Semifinals	Final	Rank
Athlete	Event	Opposition Result	Opposition Result	Opposition Result	Opposition Result	Rank
Giorgos Ioannou	–55 kg	Bye	Kim (KOR); L 15–23	Did not advance		
Argyris Sofotasios	–73 kg	Kapashika Lutumba (COD); W 26–4	Adel Mahmoud (EGY); L 5–29	Did not advance		

Girls

Athlete	Event	Round of 16	Quarterfinals	Semifinals	Final	Rank
Athlete	Event	Opposition Result	Opposition Result	Opposition Result	Opposition Result	Rank
Fani Tzeli	–55 kg	Bye	Beckstein (GER); W 19–11	Saengsin (THA); L 3–7	Did not advance	3rd place, bronze medalist(s)

== Weightlifting ==
Boys

Athlete	Event	Snatch		Clean & jerk		Total	Rank
Athlete	Event	Result	Rank	Result	Rank	Total	Rank
Gerasimos Galiatsatos	+85 kg	DNF					

Girls

Athlete	Event	Snatch		Clean & jerk		Total	Rank
Athlete	Event	Result	Rank	Result	Rank	Total	Rank
Mary Kardara	+58 kg	76	5	90	5	166	5
