= Sailing at the 2018 Summer Youth Olympics =

Sailing at the III Summer Youth Olympic Games
- Venue: Club Náutico San Isidro
- Dates: 7–13 October
- No. of events: 5 (2 boys, 2 girls, 1 mixed)
- Competitors: 100 (50 boys, 50 girls) from 44 nations

Sailing at the 2018 Summer Youth Olympics was held from 7 to 13 October at the Club Náutico San Isidro in San Isidro, Buenos Aires, Argentina.

== Qualification ==
Each National Olympic Committee (NOC) can enter a maximum of 5 boats, 1 per each event. As hosts, Argentina will be given a boat to compete in all events provided that they compete in either the American Continental Tournament or World Championships. A further 6 quotas will be decided by the Tripartite Commission to be given in either the Techno 293+ or IKA Twin Tip Racing events, however four of them were unused and were reallocated to the next best nation from the respective World Championship. The remaining places shall be decided by qualification events, namely the six continental qualification tournaments and the World Championships for each boat. Boats qualified in the World Championships are prioritised over the continental events.

To be eligible to participate at the Youth Olympics athletes must have been born between 1 January 2000 and 31 December 2003.

=== Techno 293+ ===
Event	Location	Date	Total Places	Qualified Boys	Qualified Girls
Host Nation	–	–	1	Argentina	Argentina
2017 World Championships	(France) Quiberon	15–20 July 2017	6	France; Great Britain; Greece; Hong Kong; Israel; Italy	France; Great Britain; Greece; Hong Kong; Israel; Italy
African Qualification Tournament	(Egypt) Ras Sedr	27 November – 2 December 2017	2	Algeria; Egypt	Algeria; Egypt
Oceania Qualification Tournament	(Australia) Brisbane	11–15 January 2018	2	Australia; New Zealand	Australia; New Zealand
Asian Qualification Tournament	Singapore	7–11 February 2018	3	China; Singapore; Japan	China; Singapore; Chinese Taipei
Central & S American Qualification Tournament	(Peru) Paracas	25–28 February 2018	2	Brazil; Peru	Brazil; Peru
European Qualification Tournament	(Italy) Palermo	1–7 April 2018	4	Netherlands; Poland; Portugal; Russia	Croatia; Norway; Poland; Belarus
N American & Caribbean Qualification Tournament	(Mexico) Cancún	23–27 May 2018	2	Mexico; United States	Mexico; United States
Tripartite Invitation	–	–	2/0	Myanmar; Oman	Not used
Reallocation (World Championships)	–	–	0/2	–	Russia; Turkey
TOTAL			24		

=== IKA Twin Tip Racing ===
Event	Location	Date	Total Places	Qualified Boys	Qualified Girls
Host Nation	–	–	1	Argentina	Argentina
North American & Caribbean Qualification Tournament	(Dominican Republic) Cabarete	15–20 January 2018	1	Antigua and Barbuda	Dominican Republic
Central & S American Qualification Tournament	(Dominican Republic) Cabarete	15–20 January 2018	1	Brazil	Venezuela
African Qualification Tournament	(Morocco) Dakhla	20–25 February 2018	1	Morocco	South Africa
European Qualification Tournament	(Morocco) Dakhla	20–25 February 2018	1	Slovenia	Italy
Asian Qualification Tournament	(Thailand) Pranburi	12–18 March 2018	1	Philippines	Thailand
Oceania Qualification Tournament	(Thailand) Pranburi	12–18 March 2018	1	Australia	New Zealand
2018 World Championships	(China) Bo'ao, Hainan	03–08 May 2018	4	Dominican Republic; China; Croatia; France	Spain; Italy; China; France
Tripartite Invitation	–	–	1	Not used	Not used
Reallocation (World Championship)	–	–	1	United States	Germany
TOTAL			12		

=== Nacra 15 ===
Event	Location	Date	Total Places	Qualified Team
Host Nation	–	–	1	Argentina
African Qualification Tournament	(Netherlands) Medemblik	21–27 October 2017	1	Tunisia
European Qualification Tournament	(Netherlands) Medemblik	21–27 October 2017	1	Germany
N American & Caribbean Qualification Tournament	(United States) Miami	18–20 November 2017	1	United States
Central & S American Qualification Tournament	(United States) Miami	18–20 November 2017	1	Uruguay
Asian Qualification Tournament	(Australia) Queensland	10–14 January 2018	1	Singapore
Oceania Qualification Tournament	(Australia) Queensland	10–14 January 2018	1	Not used
2018 World Championships	(Spain) Barcelona	22–28 April 2018	7	Belgium; France; Netherlands; Australia; Switzerland; Austria; Spain
Reallocation (World Championship)	–	–	1	Italy
TOTAL			14	

== Medal summary ==
=== Medal table ===
* Host nation (Argentina)

Rank	Nation	Gold	Silver	Bronze	Total
1	Italy	2	1	0	3
2	Argentina*	1	0	0	1
2	Dominican Republic	1	0	0	1
2	Greece	1	0	0	1
5	France	0	3	0	3
6	Philippines	0	1	0	1
6	Slovenia	0	1	0	1
6	Spain	0	1	0	1
9	Great Britain	0	0	1	1
9	Netherlands	0	0	1	1
9	Russia	0	0	1	1
Totals (11 entries)		5	7	3	15

=== Boys ===
Event	Gold	Silver	Bronze
Techno 293+	Alexandros Kalpogiannakis; Greece	Nicolò Renna; Italy	Finn Hawkins; Great Britain
IKA Twin Tip Racing	Deury Corniel; Dominican Republic	Christian Tio; Philippines Toni Vodišek; Slovenia	Not awarded

=== Girls ===
Event	Gold	Silver	Bronze
Techno 293+	Giorgia Speciale; Italy	Manon Pianazza; France	Yana Reznikova; Russia
IKA Twin Tip Racing	Sofia Tomasoni; Italy	Nina Font; Spain Poema Newland; France	Not awarded

=== Mixed ===
Event	Gold	Silver	Bronze
Nacra 15	Dente Cittadini; Teresa Romairone; Argentina	Kenza Coutard; Titouan Petard; France	Laila van der Meer; Bjarne Bouwer; Netherlands
