= Athletics at the 2018 Summer Youth Olympics – Girls' 5000 metre walk =

Girls' 5000 metre at the III Summer Youth Olympic Games
- Venue: Parque Polideportivo Roca
- Date: 12, 16 October
- Competitors: 16 from 16 nations

Medalists
| 1st place, gold medalist(s) | | Xi Ricuo | China |
| 2nd place, silver medalist(s) | | Sofia Ramos Rodríguez | Mexico |
| 3rd place, bronze medalist(s) | | Olga Fiaska | Greece |

The girls' 5000 metre walk competition at the 2018 Summer Youth Olympics was held on 12 and 16 October, at the Parque Polideportivo Roca.

== Schedule ==
All times are in local time (UTC-3).

| Date | Time | Round |
|---|---|---|
| 12 October 2018 | 14:30 | Stage 1 |
| 16 October 2018 | 14:15 | Stage 2 |

== Results ==
=== Stage 1 ===
| Rank | Athlete | Nation | Result | Notes |
|---|---|---|---|---|
| 1 | Xi Ricuo | China | 22:23.26 | PB |
| 2 | Sofia Ramos Rodríguez | Mexico | 22:29.52 | PB |
| 3 | Olga Fiaska | Greece | 22:46.13 | PB |
| 4 | Maria Villalva | Ecuador | 22:48.75 | PB |
| 5 | Evin Demir | Turkey | 23:25.54 | PB |
| 6 | Simona Bertini | Italy | 23:32.30 | PB |
| 7 | Daryna Kasyan | Ukraine | 24:01.29 | PB |
| 8 | Ana Pulgarín | Spain | 24:13.77 | |
| 9 | Sthephanie Chávez | Bolivia | 24:41.80 | PB |
| 10 | Kristina Morozova | Kazakhstan | 25:11.17 | |
| 11 | Freysi Donaires | Peru | 25:13.94 | |
| 12 | Marissa Swanepoel | South Africa | 25:21.85 | PB |
| 13 | Melany Trejo | El Salvador | 25:21.96 | |
| 14 | Sintayehu Masire | Ethiopia | 25:45.77 | PB |
| 15 | Carla López | Dominican Republic | 25:49.24 | PB |
| | Hanna Zubkova | Belarus | DQ | |

=== Stage 2 ===
| Rank | Athlete | Nation | Result | Notes |
|---|---|---|---|---|
| 1 | Xi Ricuo | China | 22:40.23 | |
| 2 | Olga Fiaska | Greece | 23:23.89 | |
| 3 | Maria Villalva | Ecuador | 23:26.70 | |
| 4 | Sofia Ramos Rodríguez | Mexico | 23:29.45 | |
| 5 | Hanna Zubkova | Belarus | 24:01.70 | |
| 6 | Simona Bertini | Italy | 24:38.81 | |
| 7 | Evin Demir | Turkey | 25:02.67 | |
| 8 | Daryna Kasyan | Ukraine | 25:06.75 | |
| 9 | Sintayehu Masire | Ethiopia | 25:21.85 | SB |
| 10 | Freysi Donaires | Peru | 25:56.71 | |
| 11 | Ana Pulgarín | Spain | 26:06.20 | |
| 12 | Marissa Swanepoel | South Africa | 26:16.93 | |
| 13 | Melany Trejo | El Salvador | 26:33.11 | |
| 14 | Sthephanie Chávez | Bolivia | 26:39.09 | |
| 15 | Kristina Morozova | Kazakhstan | 27:15.83 | |
| 16 | Carla López | Dominican Republic | 27:52.68 | |

=== Final placing ===
| Rank | Athlete | Nation | Stage 1 | Stage 2 | Total |
|---|---|---|---|---|---|
| 1st place, gold medalist(s) | Xi Ricuo | China | 22:23.26 | 22:40.23 | 45:03.49 |
| 2nd place, silver medalist(s) | Sofia Ramos Rodríguez | Mexico | 22:29.52 | 23:29.45 | 45:58.97 |
| 3rd place, bronze medalist(s) | Olga Fiaska | Greece | 22:46.13 | 23:23.89 | 46:10.02 |
| 4 | Maria Villalva | Ecuador | 22:48.75 | 23:26.70 | 46:15.45 |
| 5 | Simona Bertini | Italy | 23:32.30 | 24:38.81 | 48:11.11 |
| 6 | Evin Demir | Turkey | 23:25.54 | 25:02.67 | 48:28.21 |
| 7 | Daryna Kasyan | Ukraine | 24:01.29 | 25:06.75 | 49:08.04 |
| 8 | Ana Pulgarín | Spain | 24:13.77 | 26:06.20 | 50:19.97 |
| 9 | Sintayehu Masire | Ethiopia | 25:45.77 | 25:21.85 | 51:07.62 |
| 10 | Freysi Donaires | Peru | 25:13.94 | 25:56.71 | 51:10.65 |
| 11 | Sthephanie Chávez | Bolivia | 24:41.80 | 26:39.09 | 51:20.89 |
| 12 | Marissa Swanepoel | South Africa | 25:21.85 | 26:16.93 | 51:38.78 |
| 13 | Melany Trejo | El Salvador | 25:21.96 | 26:33.11 | 51:55.07 |
| 14 | Kristina Morozova | Kazakhstan | 25:11.17 | 27:15.83 | 52:27.00 |
| 15 | Carla López | Dominican Republic | 25:49.24 | 27:52.68 | 53:41.92 |
| | Hanna Zubkova | Belarus | DQ | 24:01.70 | |
