= Owaab Barrow =

Qatari athlete

Personal information
- Nationality: Qatari
- Born: 20 August 2001 (age 24)

Sport
- Sport: Athletics
- Event: Sprinting
Medal record
Men's sprinting
Representing Qatar
Summer Youth Olympics
Gold medal – first place	2018 Buenos Aires	110 m hurdles

Owaab Barrow (born 20 August 2001) is a Qatari athlete. He competed in the men's 100 metres event at the 2019 World Athletics Championships. He won the Youth Olympic title of 110 m hurdles (91.4 cm) at the 2018 Youth Olympics.
