= Evin Demir =

Turkish racewalker

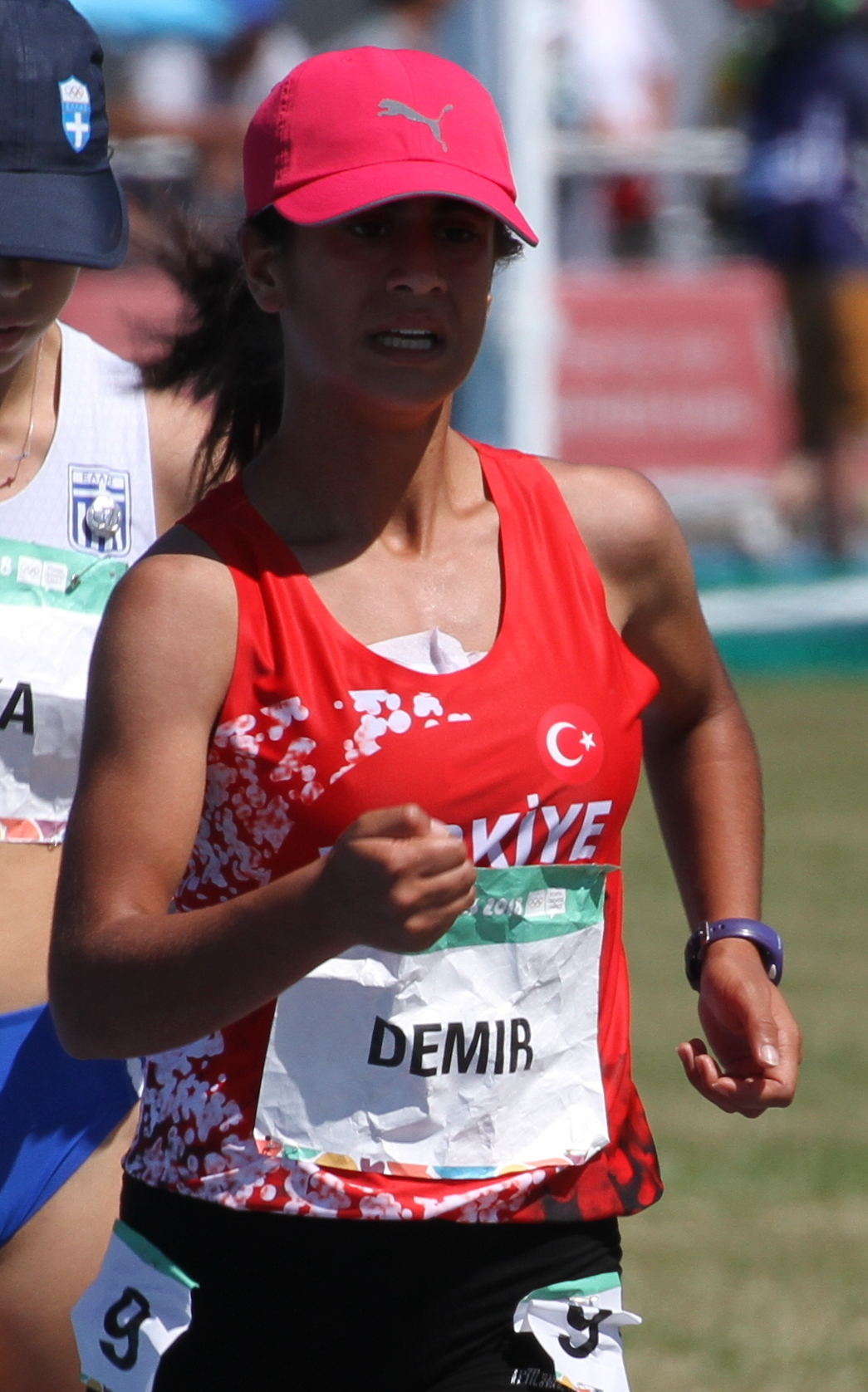
- Demir in 2018

Personal information
- Born: 16 February 2001 (age 25) Sancaktepe, Istanbul, Turkey

Sport
- Sport: Race walk
- Club: Enka SK
Medal record
Women's athletics
Representing Turkey
European U20 Championships
Silver medal – second place	2019 Borås	10,000 m race walk
European Race Walking Cup
Silver medal – second place	2019 Alytus	10 km race walk (U20)

Evin Demir (born 16 February 2001) is a Turkish race walker specialising in the 5000 m and 10,000 m events. She is a native of Sancaktepe in Istanbul. She was a member of Sancaktepe Spo, before she was transferred by Enka SK.

== Sports career ==
In 2018, Demir competed in the 5,000 m race walk event of the 2018 European Athletics U18 Championships in Győr, Hungary placing fourth. she took part at the 2018 Summer Youth Olympics in Buenos Aires, Argentina. She placed sixth in the 5,000 m race walk event.

At the 2019 Balkan Race Walking Championships in Alexandroupoli, Greece, Demir captured the gold medal in the 10 km race walk event's U20 category. She won the silver medal in the 10 km event's U20 category of the 2019 European Race Walking Cup held in Alytus, Lithuania, behind her countrywoman Meryem Bekmez. In 2019, she became silver medalist in the 10,000 m event at the European U20 Championships in Borås, Sweden, again behind Bekmez.

== Competition record ==
Year	Competition	Venue	Position	Event	Time	Notes
Representing Turkey
2018	European U18 Championships	Győr, Hungary	4th	5,000 m race walk	24:27.19	
2018	Summer Youth Olympics	Buenos Aires, Argentina	6th	5,000 m race walk	23:25.54	
2019	Balkan Race Walking Championships	Alexandroupoli, Greece	1st	10 km race walk (U20)	45:54	
2019	European Race Walking Cup	Alytus, Lithuania	2nd	10 km race walk (U20)	46:49	
2019	European U20 Championships	Borås, Sweden	2nd	10,000 m race walk	46:38.68	
