= Uruguay at the 2018 Summer Youth Olympics =

- IOC code: URU
- NOC: Uruguayan Olympic Committee
- Website: http://www.cou.org.uy/

in Buenos Aires, Argentina 6 – 18 October 2018
- Competitors: 26
- Medals: Gold 0 Silver 0 Bronze 0 Total 0

Summer Youth Olympics appearances
- 2010; 2014; 2018; 2026

Uruguay participated at the 2018 Summer Youth Olympics in Buenos Aires, Argentina from 6 October to 18 October 2018.

== Competitors ==
Sport	Boy	Girl	Total
Field hockey	0	9	9
Rowing	1	0	1
Sailing	1	1	2
Total	2	10	12

== Field hockey ==
Uruguay qualified their national women's team in March 2018.

- Girls' tournament - 1 team of 9 athletes

=== Girls' tournament ===
Preliminary round

Pos	Team	Pld	W	D	L	GF	GA	GD	Pts	Qualification
1	Argentina (H)	5	5	0	0	41	2	+39	15	Quarterfinals
2	India	5	4	0	1	29	10	+19	12	Quarterfinals
3	South Africa	5	3	0	2	19	13	+6	9	Quarterfinals
4	Austria	5	2	0	3	19	13	+6	6	Quarterfinals
5	Uruguay	5	1	0	4	23	13	+10	3	9th place game
6	Vanuatu	5	0	0	5	0	80	−80	0	11th place game

Source: FIH
Rules for classification: 1) Points; 2) Goal difference; 3) Goals scored; 4) Head-to-head result.
(H) Hosts

7 October 2018
14:45

South Africa	4–3	Uruguay
de Waal 4', 6', 14'; Weston 20'	Report	Oliveros 1', 19'; Arias 10'

Umpires:
Victoria Pazos (PAR)
Chen Jianjun (CHN)

8 October 2018
09:30

India	2–1	Uruguay
Lalremsiami 1', 19'	Report	Verga 10'

Umpires:
Sophie Bockelmann (GER)
Rhiannon Murrie (AUS)

9 October 2018
17:00

Uruguay	1–2	Austria
Martinez 15'	Report	Herzog 13'; Klausbruckner 19'

Umpires:
Lizé Srtydom (RSA)
Fatma Mahmoud (EGY)

10 October 2018
11:45

Uruguay	18–0	Vanuatu
Oliveros 2', 8', 10', 16', 16', 16'; Verga 2', 13', 13', 17'; Civetta 3'; Jover 5', 14'; Quiñones 6', 7', 20'; Suárez 17', 18'	Report

Umpires:
Chen Jianjun (CHN)
Gemma Calderon (ESP)

11 October 2018
16:15

Argentina	5–0	Uruguay
Bruggesser 4'; Ramallo 5', 9'; Rubenacker 7'; Palet 9'	Report

Umpires:
Margaux Brand (CAN)
Chen Jianjun (CHN)

9th place game

13 October 2018
13:00

Uruguay	2–0	Zimbabwe
Oliveros 8'; Suarez 13'	Report

Umpires:
Ayu Zainuddin (MAS)
Margaux Brand (CAN)

== Rowing ==
Uruguay qualified one boat based on its performance at the American Qualification Regatta.

- Boys' single sculls - 1 athlete

Athlete	Event	Time trial		Heats						Quarterfinals		Semifinals		Final	
Athlete	Event	Time trial		Round 1		Round 2		Total points	Rank	Quarterfinals		Semifinals		Final	
Athlete	Event	Time	Rank	Time	Points	Time	Points	Total points	Rank	Time	Rank	Time	Rank	Time	Rank
Martin Gonzalez Volkmann	Boys' single sculls	3:28.87	1	1:42.24	4	1:40.74	3	7	9	1:36.64	3	did not advance		1:40.44	4

== Sailing ==
Uruguay qualified one boat based on its performance at the Central and South American Nacra 15 Qualifiers.

- Mixed Nacra 15 - 1 boat

Athlete	Event	Race													Net points	Final rank
Athlete	Event	1	2	3	4	5	6	7	8	9	10	11	12	M*	Net points	Final rank
Juan Ignacio Regusci Real; Cecilia Coll Bermudez	Nacra 15	10	(15)	5	7	13	8	(15)	11	6	9	9	10	11	114.0	11
