= 2021 World Athletics U20 Championships – Women's 10,000 metres walk =

Women's 10,000 metres walk at the 2021 World Athletics U20 Championships
- Venue: Kasarani Stadium
- Dates: 21 August
- Competitors: 34 from 24 nations
- Winning time: 46:23.01

Medalists
gold medal	Sofía Ramos Rodríguez	Mexico
silver medal	Maële Biré-Heslouis	France
bronze medal	Eliška Martínková	Czech Republic

The women's 10,000 metres race walk at the 2021 World Athletics U20 Championships was held at the Kasarani Stadium on 21 August.

== Records ==
Standing records prior to the 2021 World Athletics U20 Championships
World U20 Record	Anežka Drahotová (CZE)	42:47.25	Eugene, United States	23 July 2014
Championship Record	Anežka Drahotová (CZE)	42:47.25	Eugene, United States	23 July 2014
World U20 Leading	Sofia Ramos Rodríguez (MEX)	44:56.19	Querétaro City, Mexico	13 June 2021

== Results ==
The race was held on 21 August at 10:25.

Rank	Name	Nationality	Time	Note
1st place, gold medalist(s)	Sofía Ramos Rodríguez	Mexico	46:23.01	>
2nd place, silver medalist(s)	Maële Biré-Heslouis	France	47:43.87	
3rd place, bronze medalist(s)	Eliška Martínková	Czech Republic	47:46.28	
4	Valeriya Sholomitska	Ukraine	48:13.05	
5	Martina Casiraghi	Italy	48:18.21	
6	Yelena Sborets	Authorised Neutral Athletes	48:21.52	~ ~ PB
7	Baljeet Kaur	India	48:58.17	PB
8	Margret Gati	Kenya	49:15.12	NU20R
9	Anastasia Antonopoulou	Greece	49:31.80	PB
10	Inês Mendes	Portugal	50:01.86	
11	Maria Lătărețu	Romania	50:01.93	~
12	Tiziana Spiller	Hungary	50:05.10	>
13	Jekaterina Mirotvortseva	Estonia	50:39.41	SB
14	Glendy Teletor	Guatemala	50:45.70	
15	Terézia Kurucová	Slovakia	51:33.80	
16	Petra Zahorán	Hungary	51:44.43	PB
17	Marissa Swanepoel	South Africa	51:59.20	>
18	Alžbeta Ragasová	Slovakia	52:34.58	
19	Oumayma Hsouna	Tunisia	52:52.17	
20	Yuliya Lutska	Ukraine	52:52.33	
21	Stephanie Chávez	Bolivia	53:24.09	
22	Mariana Muñoz	Costa Rica	53:24.67	
23	Janise Nell	South Africa	54:30.80	
	Gabriela de Sousa	Brazil	DNF	
	Freysi Donaires	Peru	DNF	>
	Sharon Herrera	Costa Rica	DNF	
	Inés Huallpa	Bolivia	DNF	
	Adriana Ornelas	Portugal	DNF	
	Wubalem Shigute	Ethiopia	DNF	
	Melissa Touloum	Algeria	DNF	
	Paula Valdez	Ecuador	DNF	
	Metasebiya Worku	Ethiopia	DNF	~
	Elvina Carré	France	DQ	TR54.7.5
	Anastasiya Kolchina	Authorised Neutral Athletes	DQ	TR54.7.5

Key:	~ Red card for loss of contact	> Red card for bent knee
