= Sailing at the 2018 Summer Youth Olympics – Nacra 15 =

Nacra 15 at the III Summer Youth Olympic Games
- Venue: Club Nautico San Isidro
- Dates: 8–13 October
- Competitors: 28 from 14 nations
- Winning total: 37 points

Medalists
1st place, gold medalist(s)		Dante Cittadini; Teresa Romairone	Argentina
2nd place, silver medalist(s)		Titouan Petard; Kenza Coutard	France
3rd place, bronze medalist(s)		Laila Van der Meer; Bjarne Bouwer	Netherlands

The mixed Nacra 15 competition at the 2018 Summer Youth Olympics in Buenos Aires took place between 8–13 October at Club Nautico San Isidro. Thirteen races were held.

== Schedule ==
Mon 8 Oct	Tue 9 Oct	Wed 10 Oct	Thu 11 Oct	Fri 12 Oct	Sat 13 Oct
Race 1	Race 2 Race 3 Race 4 Race 5	Race 6 Race 7 Race 8 Race 9	Rest day	Race 10; Race 11; Race 12	Medal race

== Results ==
Results of individual races
Pos	Crew	Country	I	II	III	IV	V	VI	VII	VIII	IX	X	XI	XII	MR	Tot	Pts
Gold medal	Dante Cittadini; Teresa Romairone	Argentina	2	1	4	2	4	1	7^{†}	6	2	4	1	4	6	44.0	37.0
Silver medal	Titouan Petard; Kenza Coutard	France	1	6	2	9	3	3	5	1	8	14^{†}	4	1	1	58.0	44.0
Bronze medal	Laila van der Meer; Bjarne Bouwer	Netherlands	6	3	1	4	7	7	1	5	1	1	8^{†}	5	4	53.0	45.0
4	Henri Demesmaeker; Frederique Van Eupen	Belgium	4	UFD 15^{†}	7	11	1	2	2	2	3	5	2	2	8	64.0	49.0
5	Silas Muehle; Romy Mackenbrock	Germany	UFD 15^{†}	2	6	5	2	4	6	8	7	11	7	3	9	85.0	70.0
6	Nicolas Martin; AnaClare Solé	United States	12^{†}	4	8	6	6	5	12	10	9	2	5	9	3	91.0	79.0
7	Will Cooley; Evie Haseldine	Australia	7	5	3	3	10	6	4	RDG 5.4	RDG 5.4	10	13^{†}	12	10	93.8	80.8
8	Eloisa Santacreu; Adrián Surroca	Spain	13.0	UFD 15^{†}	9	10	8	9	9	4	13	7	3	7	5	102.0	87.0
9	Andrea Spagnolli; Giulia Fava	Italy	5	UFD 15^{†}	RDG 7.1	1	5	10	3	7	11	3	12	13	12	104.1	89.1
10	Arnaud Grange; Marie Van der Klink	Switzerland	8	UFD 15^{†}	10	8	12	DNF 15	8	3	4	6	11	8	2	110.0	95.0
11	Juan Ignacio Regusci Real; Cecilia Coll Bermudez	Uruguay	10	UFD 15^{†}	5	7	13	8	UFD 15	11	6	9	9	10	11	129.0	114.0
12	Sophia Rose Meyers; Teck Pin Chia	Singapore	11	8	DNF 15^{†}	12	9	12	11	9	10	8	6	11	13	135.0	120.0
13	Laura Farese; Matthaeus Zoechling	Austria	9	UFD 15^{†}	11	14	11	11	10	DSQ 15	5	13	10	6	7	137.0	122.0
14	Chaima Chammari; Fourat Gueddana	Tunisia	DNF 15^{†}	7	12	13	14	DNF 15	13	12	12	12	14	14	14	167.0	152.0

Scoring system: low-point system;
Legend: BFD – Black flag disqualification; DNF – Did not finish; DSQ – Disqualified; RET – Retired; UFD – "U" flag disqualification; † – Discarded race not counted in the overall result;
