= Sofía Ramos Rodríguez =

Mexican racewalker (born 2002)

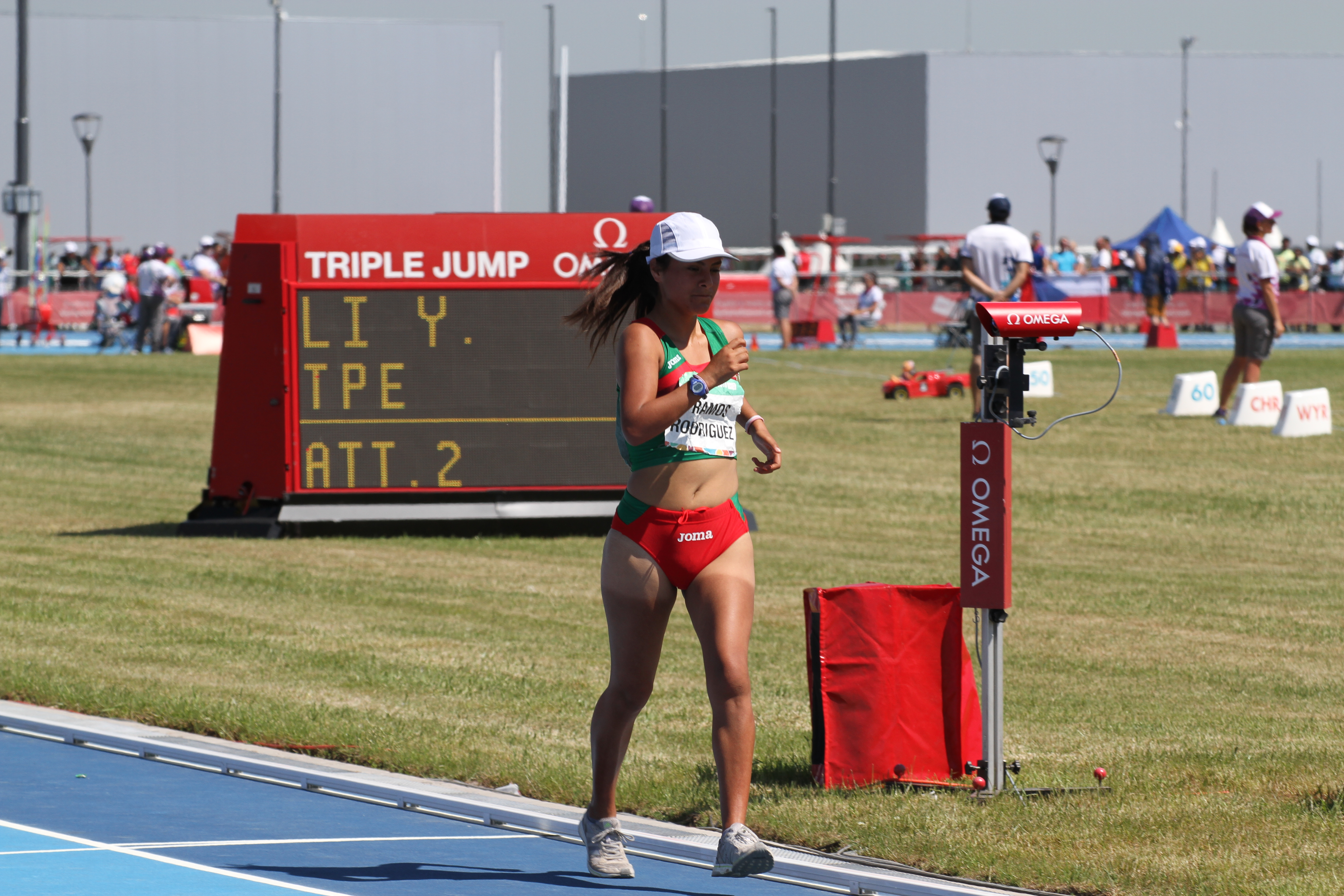
- Ramos Rodríguez at the 2018 Youth Olympics

Personal information
- National team: Mexico
- Born: 25 August 2002 (age 24)

Sport
- Country: Mexico
- Sport: Athletics
- Event: racewalking

Achievements and titles
- Personal best: 10,000 m: 44:56.19 (2021)
Medal record
World U20 Championships
Gold medal – first place	2021 Nairobi	10,000 m walk
Youth Olympic Games
Silver medal – second place	2018 Buenos Aires	5000 m walk

Sofía Elizabeth Ramos Rodríguez (born 25 August 2002) is a Mexican racewalker who specializes in the 10,000 m walk. She was the gold medallist at the World Athletics U20 Championships in 2021.
