= Ashish Goliyan =

Indian rower (born 2001)

Personal information
- Nationality: Indian
- Born: 11 July 2001 (age 24)
- Home town: Uttarakhand, India
- Height: 187 cm (6 ft 2 in)
- Weight: 81 kg (179 lb)

Sport
- Country: India
- Sport: Rowing

Ashish Goliyan (born 11 July 2001) is an Indian rower from Uttarakhand. He was named to the Indian rowing team as a substitute for the 2022 Asian Games in Hangzhou, China.

== Career ==
Ashish represented India at the 2018 Summer Youth Olympics. India qualified one boat based on it performance at the qualification regatta. In the Boys' Pair event Ashish Goliyan and Satnam Singh finished eighth. In June 2018, Ashish was part of the Indian coxed-quadruple scull event which won the silver medal at the Asian Junior Rowing Championships at Chungju, Korea. The Indian team consisting of Sanket Patil, Ashish Goliyan, Mangal Singh and Nitesh Bharduwaj clocked 06:22.351 to take silver behind Japan (06:19.691).
