= Alexandros Kalpogiannakis =

Greek sailor

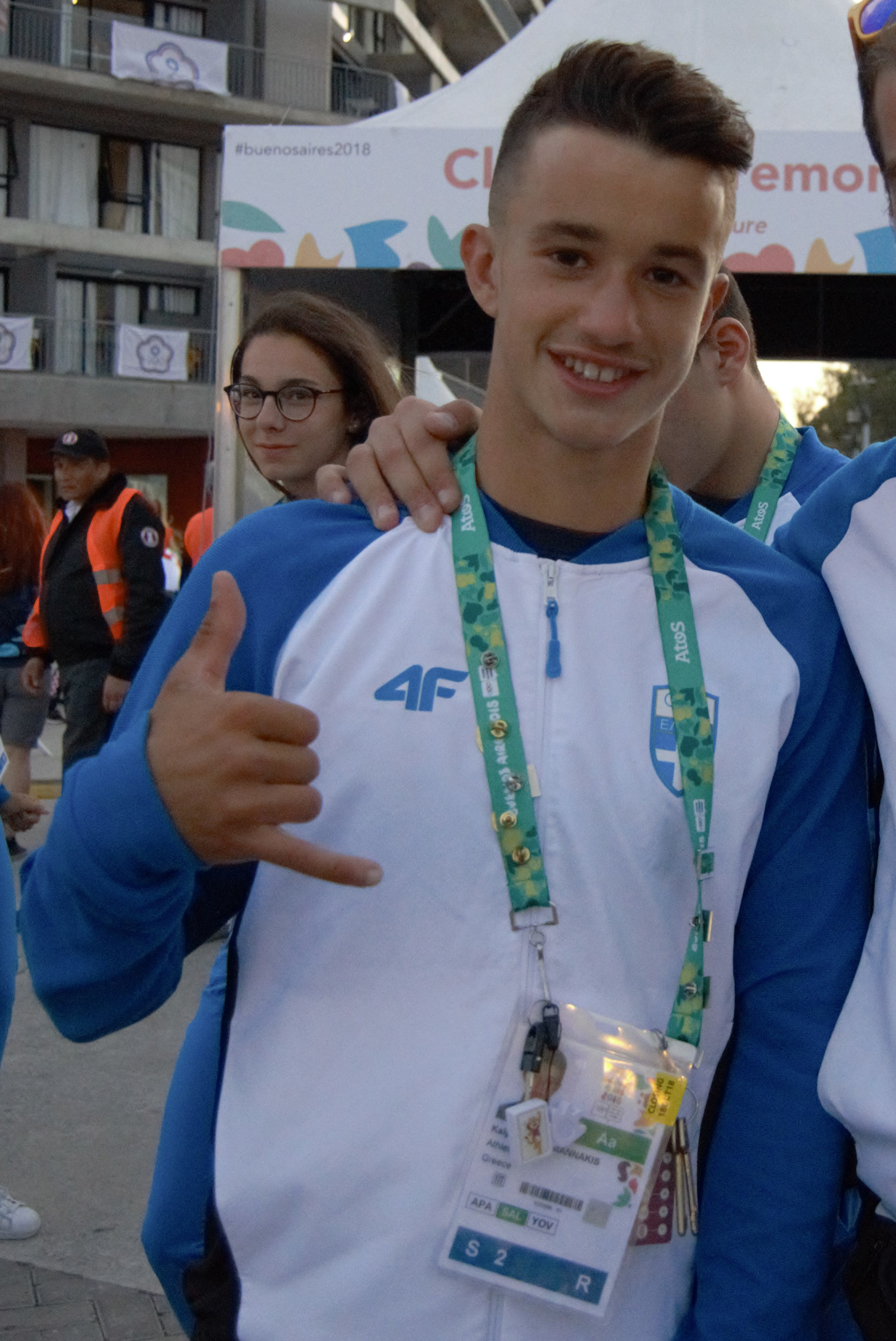
- Kalpogiannakis in 2018

Personal information
- Nationality: Greek
- Born: 29 April 2002 (age 24)
- Height: 1.75 m (5 ft 9 in)
- Weight: 65 kg (143 lb)

Sport
- Country: Greece
- Sport: Sailing
Medal record
European U21 Sailing Championships
Gold medal – first place	2018 Varkiza	Techno 293+
World U21 Sailing Championships
Silver medal – second place	2018 Liepāja	Techno 293+
Silver medal – second place	2018 Liepāja	Techno 293+ Youth
Summer Youth Olympics
Gold medal – first place	2018 Buenos Aires	Techno 293+

Alexandros Kalpogiannakis (born 29 April 2002) is a Greek sailor. He won two silver medals at the 2018 World U21 Sailing Championships and one gold medal at the 2018 European U21 Sailing Championships representing Greece. He also won a gold medal for Greece, at the 2018 Summer Youth Olympics.
