= Maria Kyridou =

Greek rower (born 2001)

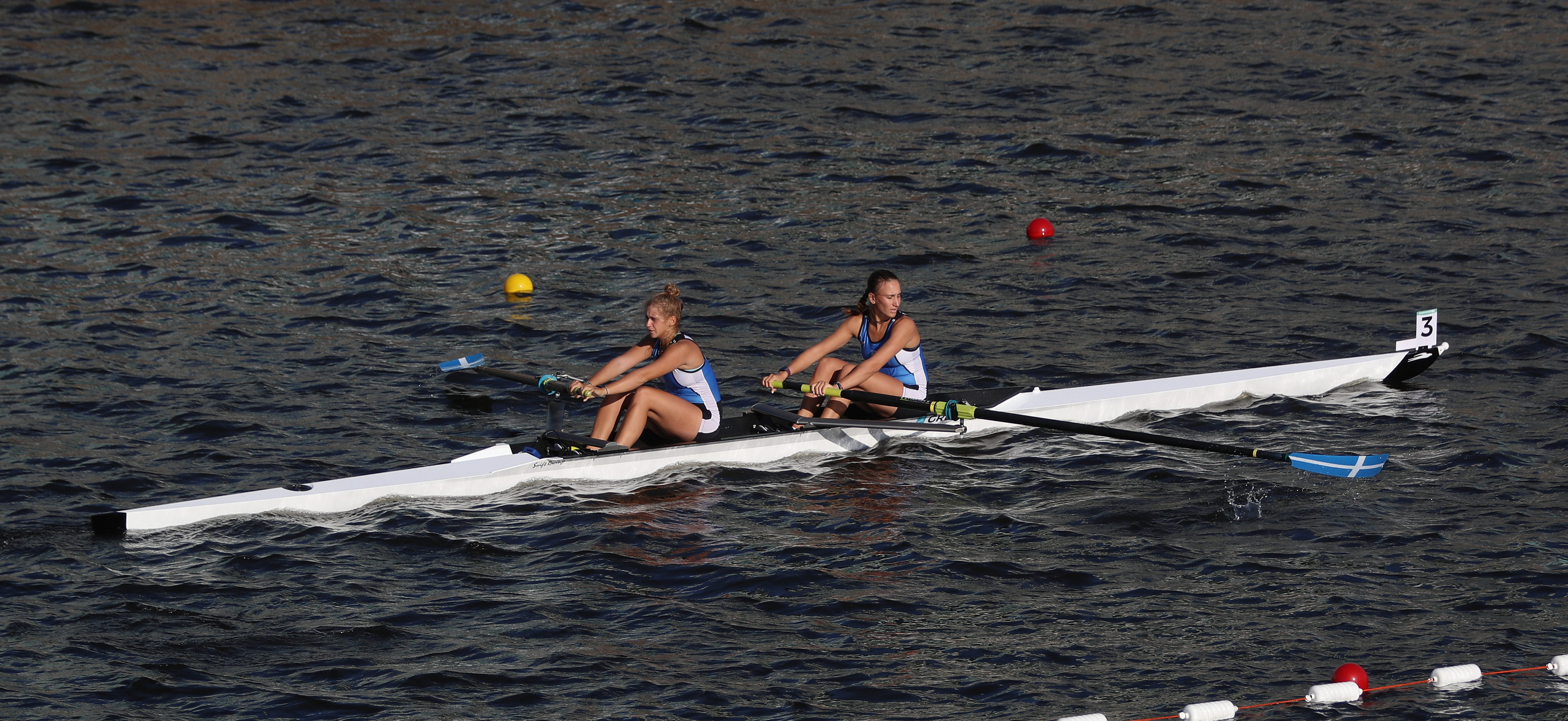
- Maria Kyridou (right) and Christina Bourmpou (left) at the 2018 Summer Youth Olympics

Personal information
- Nationality: Greek
- Born: 26 April 2001 (age 25) Thessaloniki
- Height: 1.78 m (5 ft 10 in)
- Weight: 70 kg (154 lb)

Sport
- Country: Greece
- Sport: Rowing
Medal record
Women's rowing
Representing Greece
European Championships
Bronze medal – third place	2020 Poznan	Coxless pair
World Rowing U23 Championships
Gold medal – first place	2019 Sarasota	BW2-
European Rowing U23 Championships
Gold medal – first place	2018 Brest	BW2-
Gold medal – first place	2019 Ioannina	BW2-
Silver medal – second place	2017 Kruszwica	BW2X
Silver medal – second place	2020 Duisburg	BW2-
World Rowing Junior Championships
Gold medal – first place	2018 Račice	JW2-
European Rowing Junior Championships
Gold medal – first place	2018 Gravelines	JW2-
Silver medal – second place	2019 Essen	JW1X
Summer Youth Olympics
Gold medal – first place	2018 Buenos Aires	JW2-

Maria Kyridou (Greek: Μαρία Κυρίδου; born 26 April 2001) is a Greek rower from Thessaloniki. Along with Christina Bourmpou, she won four gold medals for Greece in just over four months. The last one, was the gold medal at the 2018 Summer Youth Olympics. Kyridou participated – along with Bourmpou – at the 2020 Olympics, reaching the final and eventually taking the fifth place.

She is the sister of Anneta Kyridou. She attends The Ohio State University.
