= Jiří Pechar =

Czech philosopher and translator (1929–2022)

- Born: 7 May 1929; Příbram, Czechoslovakia
- Died: 22 August 2022 (aged 93); Prague, Czech Republic
- Occupation(s): philosopher, literary theorist and translator

Jiří Pechar (7 May 1929 – 22 August 2022) was a Czech philosopher and translator.

== Life and career ==
Born in Příbram, Pechar studied in history of literature at the Charles University, and worked as an editor for the Czechoslovak Academy of Sciences, before being dismissed for political reasons in 1958. He then worked as a freelance translator, translating in Czech works by Sigmund Freud, Marcel Proust, Martin Heidegger, Ludwig Wittgenstein, Jean-François Lyotard and Claude Lévi-Strauss among others, and was also an author of essays and collection of poems and a collaborator of magazines and journals.

Pechar was officially rehabilitated after the Velvet Revolution, becoming a research fellow at the Institute of Philosophy of the Czechoslovak Academy of Sciences and the director of its 20th Century Philosophy department. With his 1992 book Prostor imaginace he "filled a considerable gap by writing a book on psychoanalysis, overcoming at least partly the absence of interest in this domain that Czech philosophers have generally manifested".

During his life Pechar was the recipient of various honors and accolades, including the title of Officer by the Ordre des Arts et des Lettres and the Tom Stoppard Prize. He died on 22 August 2022, at the age of 93.
