= Nacra 15 =

Performance catamaran used for racing

Development
- Designer: Morrelli & Melvin, Nacra Sailing
- Year: 2015
- Role: Youth World Championships & Youth Olympic Games Multihull

Hull
- Hull weight: 140 kg (310 lb)
- LOH: 4.70 m (15.4 ft)
- Beam: 2.35 m (7 ft 9 in)

Sails
- Mainsail area: 13.6 m^{2} (146 sq ft)
- Jib/genoa area: 3.3 m^{2} (36 sq ft)
- Spinnaker area: 16.5 m^{2} (178 sq ft)

Rating
- RYA PN: 734

The Nacra 15 is a performance catamaran used for racing. It went into production in 2015. It was designed as a smaller version of the Olympic multihull class, the Nacra 17.

== Youth selection ==
In early 2015, World Sailing announced that they were looking for a new youth multihull for the ISAF Youth World Championships with a targeted crew weight of approx 110–130 kg . Nacra Sailing announced two bids for the trials, the existing Nacra 16 and the all new Nacra 15. After the trials and extensive consideration by World Sailing at their AGM in China, the Nacra 15 was confirmed as the new Youth World Championships class. It was also un-expectedly announced as a new class for the Youth Olympic Games. In 2016 British RYA selected the Nacra 15 as their new youth multihull boat, replacing the Spitfire.

== Configurations ==
| | Nacra 15 Club | Nacra 15 World Sailing | Nacra 15 FCS |
|---|---|---|---|
| Hull colour | White | White | White |
| Main and jib colour | White | White | White |
| Spinnaker colour | red/white/blue | red/white/blue | red/white/blue |
| Dagger board shape | Straight | Curved | Z-Boards |
| Dagger board construction | Aluminium | carbon composite | carbon composite |
| Rudder winglets | No | Yes | Yes |

== Events ==
=== Youth Olympic Games ===
| Year | Gold | Silver | Bronze |
|---|---|---|---|
| (Argentina) 2018 Buenos Aires (details) | Argentina; Dante Cittadini; Teresa Romairone | France; Titouan Petard; Kenza Coutard | Netherlands; Laila van der Meer; Bjarne Bouwer |
| (Senegal) 2022 Dakar | Postponed to 2026 due to COVID-19 pandemic | | |

=== Open World Championships ===
| Year | Gold | Silver | Bronze | Ref |
|---|---|---|---|---|
| (Italy) 2016 Lake Como | Great Britain; Jack Butters; James King | Great Britain; Alex Philpot; Jess D'Arcy | Netherlands; Bjarne Bouwer; Eliott Savelon | |
| (Italy) 2017 Lake Garda | Netherlands; Bjarne Bouwer; Eliott Savelon | Belgium; Lucas Clayessens; Gauthier Verlhurst | Australia; Georgia Payne; Daniel Brown | |
| (Spain) 2018 Barcelona | Belgium; Henri Demesmaeker; Frédérique Van Eupen | France; Doran Gouron Le Roch; Kenza Coutard | France; Thomas Proust; Clément Martineau | |
| (France) 2019 Marseille | Australia; Ruben Booth; Rita Booth | Germany; Jesse Lindstädt; Lisa Rausch | Italy; Andrea Spagnolli; Alice Cialfi | |
| (Switzerland) 2020 Geneva | Cancelled due to COVID-19 pandemic | | | |
| (France) 2021 La Grande-Motte | Switzerland; Axel Grandjean; Noëmi Fehlmann | France; Thomas Proust; Eloïse Clabon | France; Manolo Geslin-Grimaud; Marion Declef | |
| (Italy) 2022 Lake Garda | France; Clément Martineau; Lou Mourniac | France; Titouan Pétard; Elise Leconte | France; Thomas Proust; Eloïse Clabon | |
| (United States) 2023 Fort Lauderdale | United States; Cody Roe; KJ Hill | Switzerland; Marie Mazuay; Clément Guignard | France; Clément Martineau; Maë Cottereau | |
| (Spain) 2024 Barcelona | Belgium; Mateo Leclercq; Mathieu Pinsart | France; Côme Vic-Molinero; Fatima Tia | Italy; Lorenzo Sirena; Alice Dessy | |
| (France) 2025 La Rochelle | Italy; Lorenzo Sirena; Alice Dessy | France; Marius Praud; Emilie Mansouri | Belgium; Hannelien Borghijs; Sander Borghijs | |
| (United Kingdom) 2026 Plymouth | Italy; Mattia Di Martino; Nina Cittar | Italy; Alessandro Vargiu; Noa Lisci | France; Anahita Fontanille; Léo Jean-Albert | |

=== Youth Sailing World Championships - Mulithull Discipline ===
| Year | Gold | Silver | Bronze |
|---|---|---|---|
| (New Zealand) 2016 Auckland | France; Tim Mourniac; Charles Dorange | United States; Romain Screve; Ian Brill | Belgium; Henri Demesmaeker; Isaura Maenhaut |
| (China) 2017 Sanya | Switzerland; Max Wallenberg; Amanda Bjork-Anastassov | Australia; Shannon Dalton; Jayden Dalton | Belgium; Lucas Claeyssens; Anne Vandenberghe |
| (United States) 2018 Corpus Christi | Argentina; Teresa Romairone; Dante Cittadini | Italy; Andrea Spagnolli; Giulia Fava | New Zealand; Greta Stewart; Tom Fyfe |
| (Poland) 2019 Gdynia | Australia; Will Cooley; Rebecca Hancock | France; Titouan Petard; Marion Declef | Germany; Silas Mühle; Levke Möller |
| (Brazil) 2020 Salvador | Cancelled due to COVID-19 pandemic | | |
| (Oman) 2021 Al-Mussanah | France; Thomas Proust; Eloïse Clabon | United States; Kay Brunsvold; Cooper Delbridge | Switzerland; Axel Grandjean; Noémie Fehlmann |
| (Netherlands) 2022 The Hague | Switzerland; Axel Grandjean; Noémie Fehlmann | Spain; Daniel García de la Casa; Nora García de la Casa | France; Tiphaine Rideau; Tiphaine Rideau |
| (Brazil) 2023 Búzios | Spain; Daniel García de la Casa; Nora García de la Casa | United States; Cody Roe; Brooke Mertz | Switzerland; Marie Mazuay; Clément Guignard |
| (Italy) 2024 Lake Garda | Italy; Lorenzo Sirena; Alice Dessy | France; Côme Vic-Molinero; Fatima Tia | Belgium; Hannelien Borghijs; Sander Borghijs |
| (Portugal) 2025 Vilamoura | Italy; Lorenzo Sirena; Alice Dessy | France; Marius Praud; Émilie Mansouri | United States; Dylan Tomko; Casey Small |

=== Foiling World Championships ===
| Year | Gold | Silver | Bronze |
|---|---|---|---|
| (France) 2019 Marseille | Belgium; Lucas Claeyssens; Anne Vandenberghe | Great Britain; Owen Bowerman; Jasmine Williams | Great Britain; Benno Marstaller; Theo Williams |

=== European Championships ===
| Year | Gold | Silver | Bronze |
|---|---|---|---|
| (Italy) 2018 Lake Como | Belgium; Henri Demesmaeker; Frédérique Van Eupen | Italy; Andrea Spagnolli; Giulia Fava | Switzerland; Arnaud Grange; Marie van der Klink |
| (Switzerland) 2021 Silvaplana | France; Clement Martineau; Thomas Proust | France; Camille Rigaud; Julien Moutarde | France; Manolo Geslin Grimaud; Marion Declef |
| (France) 2022 Carnac | Switzerland; Axel Grandjean; Noémie Fehlmann | France; Clement Martineau; Lou Mourniac | France; Camille Rigaud; Lorcan Johnson |
| (Belgium) 2023 Knokke-Heist | Switzerland; Marie Mazuay; Clément Guignard | Belgium; Mateo Leclercq; Mathieu Pinsart | France; Côme Rouseré; Hugues Vandermersch |
| (Italy) 2024 Cagliari | Spain; Daniel García de la Casa; Nora García de la Casa | Belgium; Mateo Leclercq; Mathieu Pinsart | Belgium; Hannelien Borghijs; Sander Borghijs |
| (Hungary) 2025 Balatonföldvár | Italy; Alessandro Vargiu; Noa Lisci | Italy; Mattia Di Martino; Nina Cittar | Belgium; Hannelien Borghijs; Sander Borghijs |
| (Spain) 2026 Barcelona | Italy; Mattia Di Martino; Nina Cittar | Italy; Alessandro Vargiu; Noa Lisci | France; Félix Tron; Moana Annonier |

=== Youth Olympic Games Qualifiers ===
| Event | Gold | Silver | Bronze |
|---|---|---|---|
| (Netherlands) 2017 Medemblik | Great Britain; Benno Marstaller; Chloe Collenette | Australia; Shannon Dalton; Jayden Dalton | Switzerland; Max Wallenberg; Amanda Bjork-Anastassov |
| (United States) 2017 Miami | United States; Nicolas Martin; AnnaClare Sole | United States; Mark Brunsvold; Dylan Heinz | United States; Ben Rosenberg; Claire Housey |
| (Australia) 2018 Brisbane | Australia; Will Cooley; Evie Haseldine | Australia; Tom Crockett; Tahine Caldecoat | Australia; Ashleigh Swadling; George Morton |

=== European Super Series ===
| Event | Gold | Silver | Bronze |
|---|---|---|---|
| (Europe) 2019 | Germany; Silas Mühle; Levke Möller | Belgium; Lucas Claeyssens; Anne Vandenberghe | Great Britain; Theo Williams; Jasmine Williams |
| (Europe) 2020 | Series cancelled due to COVID-19 pandemic | | |
| (Europe) 2023 | Great Britain; Sam Cox; Sophie Raven | Belgium; Mateo Leclercq; Mathieu Pinsart | Germany; Frederic Schule; Catharina Jacobs |
| (Europe) 2024 | Netherlands; Feline Mous; Willemijn Valkenburg | Great Britain; Tom Jones; Maddie Jinks | Belgium; Mateo Leclercq; Mathieu Pinsart |
