= Hong Kong at the 2018 Summer Youth Olympics =

- IOC code: HKG
- NOC: Sports Federation and Olympic Committee of Hong Kong, China
- Website: http://www.hkolympic.org/

in Buenos Aires, Argentina 6 – 18 October 2018
- Competitors: 25 in 9 sports
- Flag bearer: Kaylin Hsieh
- Medals Ranked 76th: Gold 0 Silver 1 Bronze 1 Total 2

Summer Youth Olympics appearances (overview)
- 2010; 2014; 2018; 2026

Hong Kong participated at the 2018 Summer Youth Olympics in Buenos Aires, Argentina from 6 to 18 October 2018.

== Competitors ==
Sport	Boys	Girls	Total
Equestrian	1	0	1
Fencing	1	3	4
Rowing	1	0	1
Sailing	1	1	2
Swimming	2	2	4
Table tennis	0	1	1
Triathlon	1	1	2

== Aquatics ==
=== Swimming ===
- Boys - Nicholas Lim (LRC), Mok Kai Tik Marcus (WTS)
- Girls - Ho Nam Wai (WTS), Kan Cheuk Tung Natalie (HVA)

== Equestrian ==
Hong Kong qualified a rider at the FEI World Jumping Challenge 2nd Competition Category A.

- Individual Jumping - Ho Yuen, Edgar Fung

== Fencing ==
Hong Kong qualified four athletes based on its performance at the 2018 Cadet World Championship.

- Boys' Foil - Chan Pak Hei
- Girls' Épée - Kaylin Hsieh
- Girls' Foil - Christelle Joy Ko
- Girls' Sabre - Ma Ho Chee

== Rowing ==
Hong Kong qualified one boat based on his performance at the 2018 Asian Youth Olympic Games Qualification Regatta.

- Boys' single sculls - 1 athlete

== Sailing ==
Hong Kong qualified two boats based on their performance at the 2017 World Techno 293+ Championships.

- Boys' Techno 293+ - 1 boat
- Girls' Techno 293+ - 1 boat

== Table tennis ==
Hong Kong qualified one table tennis player based on her performance at the Road to Buenos Aires (Europe) series.

- Girls' singles - Lee Ka Yee

== Triathlon ==
Hong Kong qualified two athletes based on its performance at the 2018 Asian Youth Olympic Games Qualifier.

Individual

Athlete	Event	Swim (750m)	Trans 1	Bike (20 km)	Trans 2	Run (5 km)	Total Time	Rank
Hung Tik Long	Boys	10:45	0:27	29:20	0:28	19:13	1:00:13	28
Lo Ho Yan	Girls	10:39	1:04	32:54	0:32	20:59	1:06:08	27

Relay

Athlete	Event	Total Times per Athlete (Swim 250m, Bike 6.6 km, Run 1.8 km)	Total Group Time	Rank
Asia 2 Maki Uchida (JPN); Hung Tik Long (HKG); Yu Xinying (CHN); Chong Xian Hao (MAS)	Mixed Relay	23:40 (13); 24:22 (14); 25:21 (11); 23:26 (11)	1:36:49 1P	13
World Team 1 Lo Ho Yan (HKG); Mohamed Tarek (EGY); Maram Yasseer Mohamed (EGY); Zakaria Alkharrat (SYR)	Mixed Relay	24:35 (16); 23:16 (13); 27:07 (14); 24:40 (14)	1:39:38	14
