= Teresa Romairone =

Argentine sailor (born 2000)

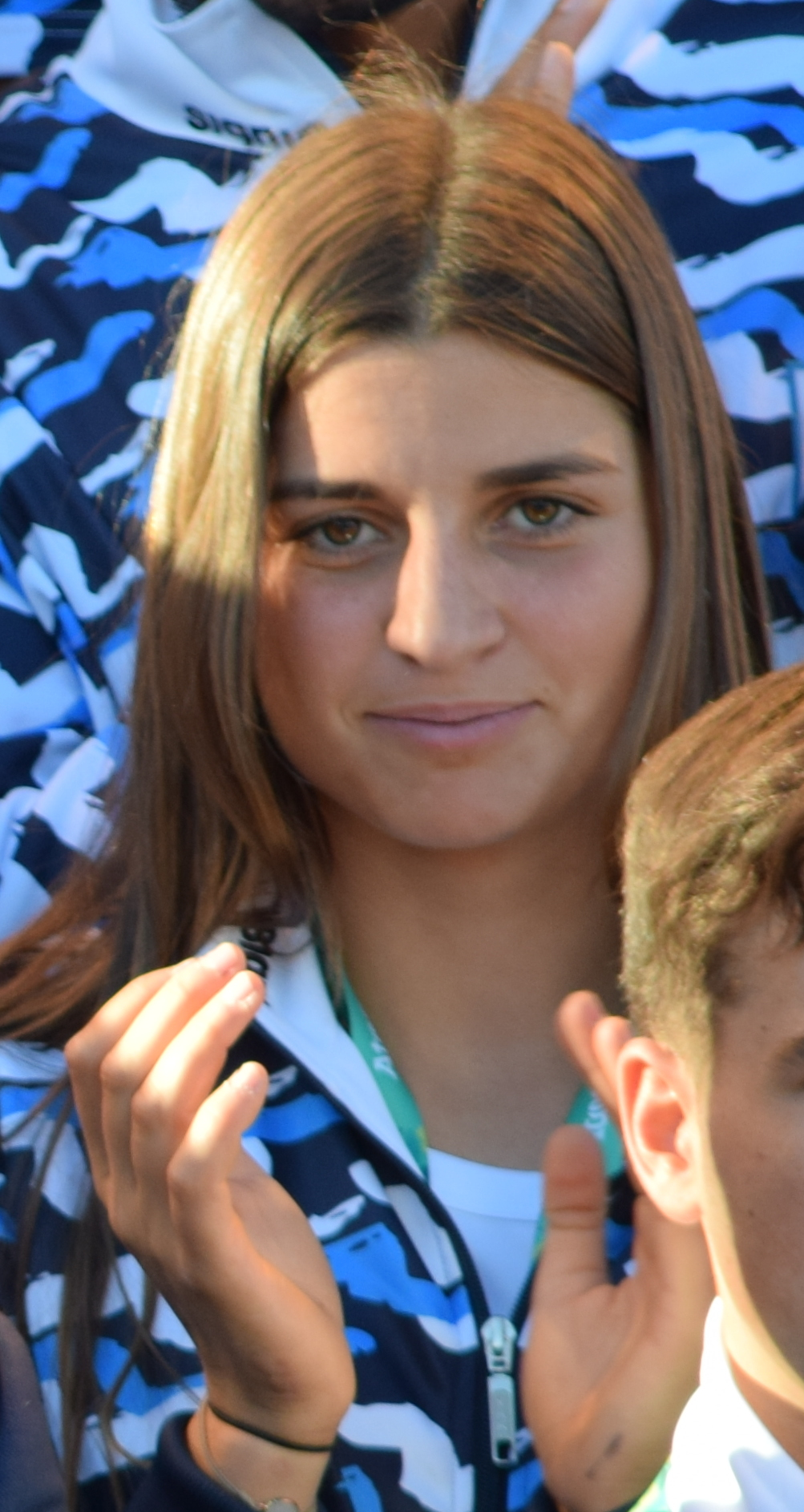
- Romairone in 2018

Personal information
- Nationality: Argentina
- Born: 24 April 2000 (age 26) Buenos Aires, Argentina

Sport
- Sport: Sailing
Medal record
Representing Argentina
Youth Olympic Games
Gold medal – first place	2018 Buenos Aires	Nacra 15

Teresa Romairone (born 24 April 2000) is an Argentine sailor who competed at the 2018 Summer Youth Olympics and won gold in the Nacra 15 class sailing with Dante Cittadini. Together they also won the 2018 Youth Sailing World Championships.
