= Chan Pak Hei =

Hong Kong footballer

Personal information
- Full name: Chan Pak Hei
- Date of birth: 26 March 1997 (age 29)
- Place of birth: Hong Kong
- Height: 1.78 m (5 ft 10 in)
- Positions: Midfielder; right winger

Youth career
- 2014–2015: Pegasus

College career
| Years | Team | Apps | (Gls) |
| 2016 | Campbellsville | 2 | (1) |
| 2017–2019 | Fresno Pacific | 51 | (7) |

Senior career*
| Years | Team | Apps | (Gls) |
| 2012–2014 | Tuen Mun | 2 | (0) |
| 2015–2016 | Pegasus | 1 | (0) |
| 2020–2021 | Hoi King | 1 | (0) |
| 2022–2024 | Tuen Mun | 39 | (18) |
| 2024–2025 | Lucky Mile | 20 | (9) |
| 2025–2026 | HKFC | 15 | (2) |

International career
| 2015 | Hong Kong U-19 | 3 | (0) |
- * Club domestic league appearances and goals as of 16 May 2026

Chan Pak Hei (Chinese: 陳柏熹; born 26 March 1997) is a former Hong Kong professional footballer who played as a midfielder.

== College career ==
Chan spent his college career at Campbellsville and Fresno Pacific.

== Club career ==
On 1 August 2025, Chan returned to the top flight and joined Hong Kong Premier League club HKFC.
