= 2026 South American Under-23 Championships in Athletics – Results =

These are the full results of the 2026 South American Under-23 Championships in Athletics which took place between 16 and 18 October at Centro de Alto Rendimiento Deportivo Pedro Candioti in Santa Fe, Argentina.

== Men's results ==
=== 100 metres ===
Heats – 16 October
Wind:
Heat 1: -0.6 m/s, Heat 2: -1.0 m/s

Rank	Heat	Name	Nationality	Time	Notes
1	1	Tomás Villegas	Argentina	10.53	Q
2	1	Gustavo Mongelós	Paraguay	10.60	Q
2	2	Lucas Villegas	Argentina	10.60	Q
4	1	Ángel Ramírez	Venezuela	10.64	Q
5	1	Luis Hernández	Colombia	10.67	q
6	1	Roy Chila	Ecuador	10.69	q
7	1	Wesley Dionisio	Brazil	10.71	
8	2	Benjamín Aravena	Chile	10.78	Q
9	2	Santiago Lazar	Uruguay	10.83	Q
10	2	Jhumiler Sánchez	Paraguay	10.87	
11	1	Robert Marcus	Guyana	10.96	
12	1	Mariano Fiol	Peru	10.99	
13	1	Adrián Nicolari	Uruguay	11.01	
14	2	Tomás León	Chile	11.08	
15	2	Luis Humberto Angulo	Peru	11.08	
16	2	Stiven Méndez	Ecuador	11.14	
17	1	Rivaro Bruno	Suriname	11.15	
17	2	Jeremiah George	Guyana	11.15	
19	2	Keiver Pirela	Venezuela	11.18	
20	2	Jean Castro	Brazil	11.38	

Final – 16 October

Wind: -1.4 m/s

Rank	Lane	Name	Nationality	Time	Notes
1st place, gold medalist(s)	5	Tomás Villegas	Argentina	10.42	
2nd place, silver medalist(s)	6	Lucas Villegas	Argentina	10.44	
3rd place, bronze medalist(s)	3	Ángel Ramírez	Venezuela	10.45	
4	7	Gustavo Mongelós	Paraguay	10.56	
5	4	Benjamín Aravena	Chile	10.62	
6	2	Luis Hernández	Colombia	10.71	
7	9	Roy Chila	Ecuador	10.74	
8	8	Santiago Lazar	Uruguay	10.83	

=== 200 metres ===
Heats – 18 October
Wind:
Heat 1: -1.2 m/s, Heat 2: -1.5 m/s

Rank	Heat	Name	Nationality	Time	Notes
1	1	Renan Gallina	Brazil	20.96	Q
2	2	Tomás Mondino	Argentina	21.28	Q
3	2	Mateo Peña	Colombia	21.52	Q
4	2	Benjamín Aravena	Chile	21.63	Q
5	1	Roy Chila	Ecuador	21.65	Q
6	1	Gustavo Mongelós	Paraguay	21.68	Q
7	2	Jhumiler Sánchez	Paraguay	21.72	q
8	1	Keiver Pirela	Venezuela	21.73	q
9	1	Enoc Marum	Colombia	21.92	
10	1	Juan Pedro Álvarez	Uruguay	22.13	
11	2	Tishawn Easton	Guyana	22.33	
12	1	Tomás León	Chile	22.51	
13	2	Paulo Batista	Brazil	25.83	
	2	Axel Gómez	Venezuela	DNS	

Final – 18 October

Wind: -0.2 m/s

Rank	Lane	Name	Nationality	Time	Notes
1st place, gold medalist(s)	6	Renan Gallina	Brazil	20.57	
2nd place, silver medalist(s)	5	Tomás Mondino	Argentina	20.97	
3rd place, bronze medalist(s)	7	Mateo Peña	Colombia	21.25	
4	2	Jhumiler Sánchez	Paraguay	21.46	
5	1	Keiver Pirela	Venezuela	21.48	
6	8	Gustavo Mongelós	Paraguay	21.53	
7	4	Benjamín Aravena	Chile	21.59	
8	3	Roy Chila	Ecuador	21.65	

=== 400 metres ===
Heats – 16 October

Rank	Heat	Name	Nationality	Time	Notes
1	2	Emerson Nascimento	Brazil	46.71	Q
2	2	Tishawn Easton	Guyana	46.75	Q
3	2	Axel Gómez	Venezuela	46.80	Q
4	1	Vinícius Galeno	Brazil	47.05	Q
5	1	Jeffrey Cajo	Peru	47.28	Q
6	1	Dusthyn Morquecho	Ecuador	47.36	Q
7	2	Camilo Redondo	Colombia	47.80	q
8	1	Manuel Robles	Argentina	48.19	q
9	2	Ian Andrey Pata	Ecuador	48.49	
10	2	Agustín Coronel	Argentina	50.13	
11	2	Augusto Chaparro	Paraguay	50.82	
12	1	David Sandes	Uruguay	51.24	
13	1	Albaro Ramírez	Paraguay	52.04	

Final – 17 October

Rank	Lane	Name	Nationality	Time	Notes
1st place, gold medalist(s)	6	Vinícius Galeno	Brazil	46.32	
2nd place, silver medalist(s)	4	Tishawn Easton	Guyana	46.85	
3rd place, bronze medalist(s)	5	Emerson Nascimento	Brazil	47.03	
4	8	Dusthyn Morquecho	Ecuador	47.54	
5	7	Jeffrey Cajo	Peru	47.82	
6	1	Camilo Redondo	Colombia	48.02	
7	2	Manuel Robles	Argentina	48.21	
	3	Axel Gómez	Venezuela	DNS	

=== 800 metres ===
Heats – 17 October

Rank	Heat	Name	Nationality	Time	Notes
1	1	Klaus Scholz	Chile	1:49.82	Q
2	1	Giancarlo Bravo	Peru	1:50.06	Q
3	1	Jeffrey Cajo	Peru	1:51.41	Q
4	2	Adrián Mendoza	Colombia	1:51.43	Q
5	2	Tomás Salvat	Argentina	1:51.62	Q
6	1	David Preciado	Colombia	1:51.73	q
7	2	Renan Miguel	Brazil	1:51.74	Q
8	2	Lucas Jara	Chile	1:52.33	q
9	1	Tomás Mirón	Argentina	1:52.39	
10	2	Gonzalo Gervasini	Uruguay	1:52.49	
11	1	Tobías González	Uruguay	1:56.80	
12	2	Christian Acosta	Paraguay	1:59.89	
13	1	Marco Tulio	Brazil	2:01.27	

Final – 18 October

Rank	Name	Nationality	Time	Notes
1st place, gold medalist(s)	Klaus Scholz	Chile	1:48.50	
2nd place, silver medalist(s)	Tomás Salvat	Argentina	1:49.30	
3rd place, bronze medalist(s)	Giancarlo Bravo	Peru	1:49.66	
4	Adrián Mendoza	Colombia	1:49.70	
5	Renan Miguel	Brazil	1:51.27	
6	Lucas Jara	Chile	1:51.48	
7	David Preciado	Colombia	1:51.92	
8	Jeffrey Cajo	Peru	2:03.23	

=== 1500 metres ===
16 October

Rank	Name	Nationality	Time	Notes
1st place, gold medalist(s)	Klaus Scholz	Chile	3:53.85	
2nd place, silver medalist(s)	Pablo Ñauta	Ecuador	3:54.39	
3rd place, bronze medalist(s)	Uriel Muñoz	Argentina	3:54.99 (.981)	
4	Renan Miguel	Brazil	3:54.99 (.986)	
5	Luis Huaman	Peru	3:55.16	
6	Gonzalo Gervasini	Uruguay	3:55.22	
7	Edwar Márquez	Peru	3:55.53	
8	David Preciado	Colombia	3:56.42	
9	Lucas Jara	Chile	3:57.73	
10	Ekian Uruzuna	Argentina	3:59.24	
11	Marco Tulio	Brazil	3:59.57	
12	Tobías González	Uruguay	4:05.56	

=== 5000 metres ===
18 October

Rank	Name	Nationality	Time	Notes
1st place, gold medalist(s)	Edwar Márquez	Peru	14:08.81	
2nd place, silver medalist(s)	Dylan Carrasco	Colombia	14:08.90	
3rd place, bronze medalist(s)	Pablo Ñauta	Ecuador	14:13.67	
4	Luis Chávez	Peru	14:16.12	
5	Uriel Muñoz	Argentina	14:27.36	
6	Mateus de Alencar	Brazil	14:28.00	
7	Francisco Zufiaurre	Argentina	14:43.43	
8	Jessiel Páez	Ecuador	14:46.54	
9	Gastón González	Chile	14:59.80	
10	Wilmer Santos	Bolivia	15:07.43	

=== 10,000 metres ===
16 October

Rank	Name	Nationality	Time	Notes
1st place, gold medalist(s)	Dylan Carrasco	Colombia	29:59.76	
2nd place, silver medalist(s)	Pariona Nider	Peru	30:00.22	
3rd place, bronze medalist(s)	Luis Chávez	Peru	30:01.47	
4	Gustavo Silva	Brazil	30:07.16	
5	Carlos Peñafiel	Ecuador	30:32.53	
6	Maximo Andino	Argentina	32:27.53	
7	Martín Moleker	Argentina	32:28.28	
8	Germán Pérez	Uruguay	32:56.09	
	Jessiel Páez	Ecuador	DNF	

=== 110 metres hurdles ===
18 October
Wind: -0.7 m/s

Rank	Lane	Name	Nationality	Time	Notes
1st place, gold medalist(s)	4	Thiago Resende	Brazil	13.70	CR
2nd place, silver medalist(s)	6	Adrián Rodríguez	Ecuador	13.96	
3rd place, bronze medalist(s)	3	Francisco Ferreccio	Argentina	13.96	
4	2	Diego Pérez	Argentina	14.01	
5	5	José Eduardo	Brazil	14.05	
6	8	Emilio Alonso	Chile	14.10	
7	9	Brahian Fretes	Paraguay	14.34	
	7	Gerónimo Canizales	Colombia	DNS	

=== 400 metres hurdles ===
Heats – 16 October

Rank	Heat	Name	Nationality	Time	Notes
1	1	Samuel Mosquera	Colombia	51.75	Q
2	2	Ramón Fuenzalida	Chile	52.25	Q
3	1	Roineld Lara	Venezuela	52.39	Q
4	2	Lucas Rosa	Brazil	52.84	Q
5	2	Óscar Rodríguez	Venezuela	52.92	Q
6	1	Victor Lino	Brazil	53.14	Q
7	1	Ian Andrey Pata	Ecuador	53.33	q
8	1	Franco Mendoza	Argentina	53.81	q
9	2	Lucas Vaudagna	Argentina	54.15	
10	2	Iván Britez	Paraguay	55.95	
11	2	Valentino Torres	Uruguay	58.30	
12	1	Mateo Pereyra	Uruguay	59.69	

Final – 17 October

Rank	Lane	Name	Nationality	Time	Notes
1st place, gold medalist(s)	6	Samuel Mosquera	Colombia	49.97	CR
2nd place, silver medalist(s)	4	Ramón Fuenzalida	Chile	50.47	
3rd place, bronze medalist(s)	3	Óscar Rodríguez	Venezuela	50.92	
4	7	Lucas Rosa	Brazil	52.12	
5	5	Roineld Lara	Venezuela	52.40	
6	8	Victor Lino	Brazil	52.88	
7	2	Franco Mendoza	Argentina	53.35	
8	1	Ian Andrey Pata	Ecuador	53.68	

=== 3000 metres steeplechase ===
17 October

Rank	Name	Nationality	Time	Notes
1st place, gold medalist(s)	Salvador Lucero	Argentina	8:49.91	NU20R
2nd place, silver medalist(s)	Yeferson Cuno	Peru	9:00.88	
3rd place, bronze medalist(s)	Mateus dos Santos	Brazil	9:09.64	
4	Julio Espinoza	Chile	9:13.44	
5	Wilmer Santos	Bolivia	9:24.83	
6	Pereiro Hipolito	Argentina	9:29.70	
7	Bruno Núñez	Uruguay	9:59.35	
8	Lucas Núñez	Uruguay	10:10.21	
	Mateus de Alencar	Brazil	DNF	

=== 4 × 100 metres relay ===
17 October

Rank	Lane	Nation	Competitors	Time	Notes
1st place, gold medalist(s)	4	Argentina	Matías Castro, Tomás Mondino, Lucas Villegas, Tomás Villegas	39.67	
2nd place, silver medalist(s)	1	Venezuela	Ariff Pérez, Ángel Ramírez, Keiver Pirela, Óscar Rodríguez	40.42	
3rd place, bronze medalist(s)	8	Colombia	Camilo Redondo, Mateo Peña, Enoc Marum, Luis Hernández	40.68	
4	6	Chile	José Manuel Núñez, Benjamín Aravena, Tomás León, Max Moraga	41.34	
5	7	Paraguay	Alexander Villalba, Augusto Chaparro, Adrián Cespedes, Gustavo Mongelós	41.38	
6	3	Ecuador	Elías Cañola, Ian Andrey Pata, Adrián Rodríguez, Roy Chila	41.68	
7	5	Guyana	Jeremiah George, Rodel Greene, Tishawn Easton, Robert Marcus	42.03	
	2	Brazil	Jean Castro, Renan Gallina, Wesley Dionisio, Paulo Henrique Pedroso	DQ	TR24.7

=== 4 × 400 metres relay ===
18 October

Rank	Lane	Nation	Competitors	Time	Notes
1st place, gold medalist(s)	7	Brazil	Victor Chaves, Emerson Nascimento, Paulo Batista, Vinícius Galeno	3:09.18	
2nd place, silver medalist(s)	5	Ecuador	Ian Andrey Pata, Elías Cañola, Stiven Méndez, Dusthyn Morquecho	3:12.39	
3rd place, bronze medalist(s)	8	Argentina	Manuel Robles, Lucas Vaudagna, Iván Maidana, Tomás Salvat	3:12.56	
4	6	Venezuela	Óscar Rodríguez, Keiver Pirela, Ángel Ramírez, Roineld Lara	3:13.54	
5	2	Chile	Cristobal Keim, Ramón Fuenzalida, Manuel Guzmán, Max Moraga	3:13.77	
6	4	Uruguay	David Sandes, Mateo Pereyra, Tobías González, Gonzalo Gervasini	3:24.94	
7	3	Paraguay	Adrián Cespedes, Christian Acosta, Albaro Ramírez, Augusto Chaparro	3:25.77	

=== Half marathon walk ===
18 October

Rank	Name	Nationality	Time	Notes
1st place, gold medalist(s)	Jaime Ccanto	Peru	1:26:57.7	CR
2nd place, silver medalist(s)	Miguel Arcangel	Colombia	1:27:03.6	
3rd place, bronze medalist(s)	Iván Oña	Ecuador	1:32:09.1	
4	João Paulo Nobre	Brazil	1:34:40.0	
	Santiago Urbina	Brazil	DQ	
	Ricardo Damian	Argentina	DQ	
	Ezequiel Arrubla	Colombia	DNS	

=== High jump ===
18 October

Rank	Name	Nationality	1.90	1.95	2.00	2.05	2.10	2.12	2.14	Result	Notes
1st place, gold medalist(s)	Wandersson Vieira	Brazil	–	o	o	o	xo	o	xxx	2.12	
2nd place, silver medalist(s)	Daniel Pimenta	Brazil	–	o	o	xxx				2.00	
2nd place, silver medalist(s)	Cristóbal Sahurie	Chile	o	o	o	xxx				2.00	
4	Pablo Durante	Uruguay	o	o	xo	xxx				2.00	
5	Domingo Lorenzini	Chile	–	o	xxo	xxx				2.00	
6	Santiago Barberia	Argentina	o	o	xxx					1.95	
7	Manuel Cabrera	Uruguay	xo	xo	xxz					1.95	
8	Jeremia Peronja	Argentina	o	xxo	xxx					1.95	
	Janer Caicedo	Colombia								DNS	
	Juan José Basquez	Colombia								DNS	

=== Pole vault ===
16 October

Rank	Name	Nationality	4.50	4.70	4.90	5.00	5.15	Result	Notes
1st place, gold medalist(s)	Pedro Aparecido	Brazil	o	xo	o	o	xxx	5.00	
2nd place, silver medalist(s)	Aurelio Leite	Brazil	o	o	o	xxx		4.90	
3rd place, bronze medalist(s)	Andy Espinoza	Ecuador	o	o	xxx			4.70	
4	Martín Santana	Chile	xo	xxx				4.50	
	Ayrton Franco	Argentina	xxx					NM	
	Juan Quemada	Chile	xxx					NM	

=== Long jump ===
18 October

Rank	Name	Nationality	#1	#2	#3	#4	#5	#6	Result	Notes
1st place, gold medalist(s)	Christopher Thiessen	Paraguay	7.54	7.58	x	x	7.52	5.77	7.58	
2nd place, silver medalist(s)	Ángel Ramírez	Venezuela	7.39	7.46	x	3.87	x	6.85	7.46	
3rd place, bronze medalist(s)	Martín Saavedra	Argentina	7.42	7.45	7.40	7.24	6.96	7.34	7.45	
4	Mateus Borges	Brazil	7.23	7.07	7.24	7.28	7.44	7.19	7.44	
5	Alexander Villalba	Paraguay	6.89	6.98w	x	x	–	x	6.98w	
6	Nicolás Cousillas	Argentina	x	x	6.80	6.96	x	6.82	6.96	
7	Ezequiel Bossio	Uruguay	6.30	6.81	6.21	6.20	x	6.51	6.81	
	Yohance Bourne	Guyana							DNS	

=== Triple jump ===
16 October

Rank	Name	Nationality	#1	#2	#3	#4	#5	#6	Result	Notes
1st place, gold medalist(s)	Benjamin Oliveira	Brazil	15.22	15.66	15.78	15.84	x	15.67	15.84	
2nd place, silver medalist(s)	Luan Robert Silva	Brazil	15.40	x	x	15.51	–	14.87	15.51	
3rd place, bronze medalist(s)	Miguel Pirela	Venezuela	15.41	x	15.44	x	15.20	15.45	15.45	
4	Rodel Greene	Guyana	14.64	15.15	x	x	15.15	15.45	15.45	
5	Augusto López	Argentina	14.40	13.73	14.57	x	14.50	14.62	14.62	
6	Nicolás Zerpa	Argentina	13.84	x	13.91	x	14.24	14.20	14.24	

=== Shot put ===
18 October

Rank	Name	Nationality	#1	#2	#3	#4	#5	#6	Result	Notes
1st place, gold medalist(s)	Pedro Modesto	Brazil	16.29	18.85	18.14	17.91	17.99	x	18.85	
2nd place, silver medalist(s)	Alessandro Borges	Brazil	x	17.38	17.84	18.00	18.80	18.34	18.80	
3rd place, bronze medalist(s)	Luis Humberto Fossa	Peru	13.85	15.15	x	15.54	16.91	x	16.91	
4	Kevin Huang	Chile	13.86	14.32	14.36	14.62	15.30	15.09	15.30	
5	Ricardo Lobos	Chile	14.79	14.82	x	x	x	x	14.82	
6	Joaquín Díaz	Argentina	14.23	14.61	x	x	x	11.74	14.61	
7	Thiago Bazualdo	Argentina	13.87	14.02	11.13	x	14.21	x	14.21	
8	Leonardo Marin	Uruguay	x	12.10	x	x	11.80	x	12.10	

=== Discus throw ===
17 October

Rank	Name	Nationality	#1	#2	#3	#4	#5	#6	Result	Notes
1st place, gold medalist(s)	Alberto dos Santos Filho	Brazil	55.45	55.84	55.50	54.28	x	54.90	55.84	
2nd place, silver medalist(s)	Alan Mardones	Chile	51.27	53.27	51.87	50.46	51.86	53.01	53.27	
3rd place, bronze medalist(s)	Juan David Montaño	Colombia	x	x	50.34	52.21	50.18	x	52.21	
4	Vitor de Souza	Brazil	51.24	51.44	x	x	x	52.15	52.15	
5	Tomás Pacheco	Argentina	47.43	44.54	48.36	49.85	x	46.93	49.85	
6	Lucas Miño	Argentina	44.97	47.99	47.47	x	47.72	x	47.99	
7	Kevin Huang	Chile	44.26	46.93	46.02	45.51	x	44.37	46.93	
	Luis Humberto Fossa	Peru	x	x	x	x	x	x	NM	

=== Hammer throw ===
16 October

Rank	Name	Nationality	#1	#2	#3	#4	#5	#6	Result	Notes
1st place, gold medalist(s)	Miguel Castro	Chile	x	65.72	65.64	63.26	66.89	67.38	67.38	
2nd place, silver medalist(s)	Tomás Olivera	Argentina	62.08	x	66.93	65.91	x	x	66.93	
3rd place, bronze medalist(s)	Benjamín Melo	Chile	63.69	66.62	x	65.75	x	x	66.62	
4	Saúl Cuero	Ecuador	56.24	60.56	62.10	63.06	60.74	x	63.06	NR
5	Adrian Cristian	Brazil	60.46	57.46	59.88	60.70	61.65	60.72	61.65	
6	Gael Cardozo	Argentina	x	54.49	51.56	x	x	53.79	54.49	
	Juan Escarpeta	Colombia							DNS	

=== Javelin throw ===
18 October

Rank	Name	Nationality	#1	#2	#3	#4	#5	#6	Result	Notes
1st place, gold medalist(s)	Santiago Pimentel	Colombia	x	71.19	x	72.98	x	–	72.98	
2nd place, silver medalist(s)	Orlando Fernández	Venezuela	69.87	69.34	70.76	67.40	x	65.86	70.76	
3rd place, bronze medalist(s)	Yirmar Torres	Ecuador	61.31	68.52	66.95	x	x	64.79	68.52	
4	Jheicor Valor	Venezuela	x	61.66	66.46	x	64.42	63.82	66.46	
5	Alex Yuri Boher	Brazil	64.38	63.31	62.76	64.71	60.76	66.27	66.27	
OC	Leonel Rivas	Guatemala	61.46	x	64.71	58.16	59.21	63.12	64.71	
6	Adrián Viso	Argentina	60.50	62.38	62.47	58.95	62.22	57.97	62.47	
7	Kevin Machado	Uruguay	58.85	61.78	60.71	61.71	60.17	x	61.78	
8	Nicolas Fontinelly	Brazil	x	61.34	61.07	x	x	61.66	61.66	
9	Ezequiel Barra	Argentina	52.26	57.01	x				57.01	

=== Decathlon ===
16–17 October

The highest mark recorded in each event is highlighted in yellow

Rank	Athlete	Nationality	100m	LJ	SP	HJ	400m	110m H	DT	PV	JT	1500m	Points	Notes
1st place, gold medalist(s)	Ariff Pérez	Venezuela	11.12	6.74w	11.99	1.92	48.61	15.12	32.22	4.40	50.05	4:56.72	7046	
2nd place, silver medalist(s)	Mayron Gomes	Brazil	11.42	6.99	14.55	1.80	55.83	15.40	43.39	4.50	39.31	5:45.80	6588	
3rd place, bronze medalist(s)	Franco Pérez	Argentina	11.92	6.07	10.44	1.80	51.96	15.69	36.21	3.20	46.86	4:56.87	6016	
4	Maximo Gats	Argentina	11.78	6.14	9.49	1.68	51.37	19.69	23.54	3.70	26.81	4:51.51	5161	

== Women's results ==
=== 100 metres ===
Heats – 16 October
Wind:
Heat 1: -1.6 m/s, Heat 2: -1.7 m/s

Rank	Heat	Name	Nationality	Time	Notes
1	2	Glanyernis Guerra	Venezuela	11.64	Q
2	2	Suellen Vitória	Brazil	11.73	Q
3	1	Milagros D'Amico	Argentina	11.82	Q
4	1	Marleth Ospino	Colombia	11.90	Q
5	1	Hilary Rivas	Venezuela	11.91	Q
6	2	Paula Daruich	Peru	12.05	Q
7	1	Aracely Pretell	Peru	12.13	q
8	2	Emily Román	Colombia	12.21	q
9	1	Larissa de Jesus	Brazil	12.29	
10	1	Naira Wiebe	Paraguay	12.53	
10	2	Brandy Romero	Uruguay	12.53	
12	2	Jimena Sostoa	Paraguay	12.69	

Final – 16 October

Wind: -2.2 m/s

Rank	Lane	Name	Nationality	Time	Notes
1st place, gold medalist(s)	5	Glanyernis Guerra	Venezuela	11.67	
2nd place, silver medalist(s)	6	Milagros D'Amico	Argentina	11.77	
3rd place, bronze medalist(s)	7	Suellen Vitória	Brazil	11.80	
4	3	Hilary Rivas	Venezuela	11.82	
5	4	Marleth Ospino	Colombia	11.90	
6	2	Aracely Pretell	Peru	11.98	
7	8	Paula Daruich	Peru	12.03	
8	9	Emily Román	Colombia	12.28	

=== 200 metres ===
Heats – 18 October
Wind:
Heat 1: -1.6 m/s, Heat 2: -1.5 m/s

Rank	Heat	Name	Nationality	Time	Notes
1	1	Glanyernis Guerra	Venezuela	23.97	Q
2	1	Marleth Ospino	Colombia	24.16	Q
3	2	Danna Banquez	Colombia	24.21	Q
4	2	Hilary Rivas	Venezuela	24.38	Q
5	2	Hakelly Maximiano	Brazil	24.49	Q
6	1	Génesis Cañola	Ecuador	24.57	Q
7	1	Aracely Pretell	Peru	24.66	q
8	1	Victoria Campos	Brazil	24.80	q
9	2	Julieta Telias	Argentina	24.88	
10	2	Brandy Romero	Uruguay	25.72	
11	1	Milva Aranda	Paraguay	26.20	
12	2	Jazmín Quiñónez	Paraguay	26.60	
	2	Paula Daruich	Peru	DNF	
	1	Pilar Rodríguez	Chile	DNS	

Final – 18 October

Wind: -1.3 m/s

Rank	Lane	Name	Nationality	Time	Notes
1st place, gold medalist(s)	6	Glanyernis Guerra	Venezuela	23.87	
2nd place, silver medalist(s)	3	Hilary Rivas	Venezuela	23.91	
3rd place, bronze medalist(s)	5	Danna Banquez	Colombia	24.02	
4	7	Marleth Ospino	Colombia	24.34	
5	4	Hakelly Maximiano	Brazil	24.42	
6	2	Aracely Pretell	Peru	24.67	
7	1	Victoria Campos	Brazil	24.71	
8	8	Génesis Cañola	Ecuador	24.96	

=== 400 metres ===
17 October

Rank	Lane	Name	Nationality	Time	Notes
1st place, gold medalist(s)	4	Osmary Pacheco	Venezuela	53.5	
2nd place, silver medalist(s)	6	Paola Loboa	Colombia	54.5	
3rd place, bronze medalist(s)	3	Génesis Cañola	Ecuador	54.7	
4	7	Pamela Barreto	Ecuador	56.2	
5	5	Júlia Ribeiro	Brazil	56.3	
6	2	Angela Almada	Argentina	57.3	
7	8	Antonella Rodríguez	Argentina	1:00.2	
8	1	Luana Almirón	Paraguay	1:01.1	

=== 800 metres ===
18 October

Rank	Name	Nationality	Time	Notes
1st place, gold medalist(s)	Sabrina Pena	Brazil	2:05.38	CR
2nd place, silver medalist(s)	Anita Poma	Peru	2:07.49	
3rd place, bronze medalist(s)	Luise Braga	Brazil	2:07.55	
4	Pamela Barreto	Ecuador	2:08.13	
5	Araceli Martínez	Paraguay	2:10.95	
6	María Paz Romero	Argentina	2:11.29	
7	Ingrid Heyer	Argentina	2:14.07	
8	Lucía Hernandorena	Uruguay	2:20.88	
9	Sofía Henao	Uruguay	2:28.86	

=== 1500 metres ===
16 October

Rank	Name	Nationality	Time	Notes
1st place, gold medalist(s)	Anita Poma	Peru	4:19.91	CR
2nd place, silver medalist(s)	Valentina Velardez	Argentina	4:22.40	
3rd place, bronze medalist(s)	Luz Arias	Peru	4:24.81	
4	Antonella Bonomi	Uruguay	4:37.44	
5	Luise Braga	Brazil	4:38.00	
6	Sabrina Pena	Brazil	4:41.00	
7	Laura Camargo	Colombia	4:51.65	

=== 5000 metres ===
18 October

Rank	Name	Nationality	Time	Notes
1st place, gold medalist(s)	Veronica Huacasi	Peru	16:44.50	
2nd place, silver medalist(s)	Luz Arias	Peru	17:02.72	
3rd place, bronze medalist(s)	Valentina Velardez	Argentina	17:22.53	
4	Tamara Villegas	Chile	17:35.73	
5	Emanueli Hein	Brazil	17:47.79	
6	Sofía Sánchez	Argentina	17:59.30	

=== 10,000 metres ===
16 October

Rank	Name	Nationality	Time	Notes
1st place, gold medalist(s)	Tamara Villegas	Chile	35:46.76	
2nd place, silver medalist(s)	Rocío Campanini	Argentina	36:10.48	
3rd place, bronze medalist(s)	Kauane Joaquim	Brazil	36:34.15	
4	Helen Pachón	Colombia	37:40.18	
	Ailen Pozueta	Argentina	DNF	

=== 100 metres hurdles ===
18 October
Wind: -1.6 m/s

Rank	Lane	Name	Nationality	Time	Notes
1st place, gold medalist(s)	6	Helen Bernard	Argentina	13.49	
2nd place, silver medalist(s)	4	Catalina Rozas	Chile	13.58	
3rd place, bronze medalist(s)	5	Pietra Campbell	Brazil	14.02	
4	8	Leonor Ferreiro	Chile	14.15	
5	7	Ionane Azevedo	Brazil	14.19	
6	2	Paloma Feito	Argentina	14.25	
7	9	Guadalupe Ezquerra	Uruguay	15.14	
8	10	Rossmary Paredes	Paraguay	15.34	
	3	Valeria George	Colombia	DNS	

=== 400 metres hurdles ===
17 October

Rank	Lane	Name	Nationality	Time	Notes
1st place, gold medalist(s)	5	Camille de Oliveira	Brazil	57.66	
2nd place, silver medalist(s)	4	Nykolli Alves	Brazil	59.44	
3rd place, bronze medalist(s)	6	Montserrath Gauto	Paraguay	1:00.23	
4	2	Milena Raschella	Argentina	1:01.58	
5	7	Mariana Scaramelli	Uruguay	1:03.67	
6	8	Lujan Moneda	Argentina	1:03.68	
7	1	Serrana Pintos	Uruguay	1:09.29	
	3	Elisa Aguado	Chile	DNF	

=== 3000 metres steeplechase ===
17 October

Rank	Name	Nationality	Time	Notes
1st place, gold medalist(s)	Gabriela Tardivo	Brazil	10:28.27	
2nd place, silver medalist(s)	Magnolia Nina	Peru	10:33.83	
3rd place, bronze medalist(s)	Antonella Bonomi	Uruguay	10:36.18	NR
4	Laura Camargo	Colombia	10:47.51	
5	Joaquina Dura	Argentina	10:49.91	
6	Ana Laura Trevisan	Brazil	10:57.67	
7	Emilia Gigon	Argentina	11:02.26	

=== 4 × 100 metres relay ===
17 October

Rank	Lane	Nation	Competitors	Time	Notes
1st place, gold medalist(s)	3	Venezuela	Hilary Rivas, Orihana Guzmán, Valeria Uriepero, Glanyernis Guerra	44.93	
2nd place, silver medalist(s)	7	Brazil	Pietra Campbell, Hakelly Maximiano, Victoria Campos, Suellen Vitória	45.32	
3rd place, bronze medalist(s)	4	Colombia	Emily Román, Paola Loboa, Danna Banquez, Marleth Ospino	45.35	
4	6	Argentina	Francucci Paz, Stefania Oblak, Julieta Telias, Milagros D'Amico	45.88	
5	5	Paraguay	Jazmín Quiñónez, Jimena Sostoa, Milva Aranda, Naira Wiebe	47.85	

=== 4 × 400 metres relay ===
17 October

Rank	Lane	Nation	Competitors	Time	Notes
1st place, gold medalist(s)	5	Brazil	Nykolli Alves, Sabrina Pena, Luise Braga, Camille de Oliveira	3:42.81	
2nd place, silver medalist(s)	7	Ecuador	Daniela Castro, Gloria Cañola, Pamela Barreto, Génesis Cañola	3:46.39	
3rd place, bronze medalist(s)	6	Argentina	Francucci Paz, Candela Basaldua, Milena Raschella, Angela Almada	3:48.37	

=== Half marathon walk ===
18 October

Rank	Name	Nationality	Time	Notes
1st place, gold medalist(s)	Rubi Segura	Colombia	1:39:31.7	CR
2nd place, silver medalist(s)	Sasha Quispe	Peru	1:39:55.7	
3rd place, bronze medalist(s)	Yhomayra Barron	Bolivia	1:50:25.6	
4	Thaliane Miranda	Brazil	1:55:59.7	
	Natalia Pulido	Colombia	DNS	

=== High jump ===
17 October

Rank	Name	Nationality	1.55	1.60	1.65	1.70	1.75	1.80	1.84	Result	Notes
1st place, gold medalist(s)	Maria Eduarda de Oliveira	Brazil	o	–	o	o	xo	xo	xxx	1.80	
2nd place, silver medalist(s)	Lola Verdini	Argentina	–	o	o	o	xxx			1.70	
3rd place, bronze medalist(s)	Antonia Paut	Chile	–	o	o	xo	xxx			1.70	
4	Maria Clara	Brazil	–	xo	o	xxo	xxx			1.70	
5	Morena Arpires	Argentina	o	o	o	xxx				1.65	
6	Juliana Fontes	Uruguay	o	xxo	xxx					1.60	
	Valeria George	Colombia								DNS	
	Hellen Tenorio	Colombia								DNS	

=== Pole vault ===
17 October

Rank	Name	Nationality	3.20	3.40	3.60	3.70	3.80	3.90	4.00	4.12	Result	Notes
1st place, gold medalist(s)	Debora Sabino	Brazil	–	–	o	–	o	xxo	o	xxx	4.00	
2nd place, silver medalist(s)	Carolina Scarponi	Argentina	–	–	o	–	xo	o	xxx		3.90	
3rd place, bronze medalist(s)	Julia Calabretti	Brazil	–	–	xo	–	xo	o	xxx		3.90	
4	Luna Pabón	Colombia	–	–	–	o	xo	xxx			3.80	
5	Josefina Britez	Paraguay	xo	xo	xxx						3.40	
6	Josefa Arellano	Chile	o	xxx							3.20	
7	Valentina Mozó	Chile	xo	xxx							3.20	

=== Long jump ===
18 October

Rank	Name	Nationality	#1	#2	#3	#4	#5	#6	Result	Notes
1st place, gold medalist(s)	Maria Teixeira	Brazil	5.77w	x	x	6.01	x	5.91	6.01	
2nd place, silver medalist(s)	Sofía Contreras	Chile	5.67w	5.85	5.89	5.38	x	5.96	5.96	
3rd place, bronze medalist(s)	Vanessa Sena	Brazil	x	x	5.89	x	x	5.88	5.89	
4	Pilar Martínez	Argentina	x	x	5.79w	5.24	2.88	5.59	5.79w	
5	Magdalena Hudson	Chile	5.65	5.37	x	x	5.46	5.58	5.65	
6	Milagros D'Amico	Argentina	x	5.43	x	5.56	5.46	x	5.56	
7	Paula Daruich	Peru	5.45w	5.40	5.31	5.42	5.50	5.41	5.50	
8	Krystal Morris	Guyana	5.22	5.45	5.45	5.23	x	x	5.45	
9	Orianna Díaz	Venezuela	x	x	5.31w				5.31w	
10	Victoria Duarte	Paraguay	x	4.91	x				4.91	
	Katerine Pinillo	Colombia							DNS	

=== Triple jump ===
16 October

Rank	Name	Nationality	#1	#2	#3	#4	#5	#6	Result	Notes
1st place, gold medalist(s)	Karine Martins	Brazil	12.78	12.80	12.85	x	x	x	12.85	
2nd place, silver medalist(s)	Yenifer Mendoza	Venezuela	12.74w	12.69	12.11	x	x	x	12.74w	
3rd place, bronze medalist(s)	Maria Teixeira	Brazil	12.74	-	x	12.28	–	12.31	12.74	
4	Sofía Contreras	Chile	x	x	12.47	12.46	x	12.68	12.68	
5	Magdalena Hudson	Chile	x	x	11.94	11.82	x	x	11.94	
6	Victoria Maccio	Argentina	x	x	11.79	11.52	x	x	11.79	
7	Valentina Rodríguez	Uruguay	11.23	11.20w	11.15	x	x	x	11.23	
8	Ana Ursini	Argentina	x	x	x	11.23w	11.04	x	11.23w	

=== Shot put ===
16 October

Rank	Name	Nationality	#1	#2	#3	#4	#5	#6	Result	Notes
1st place, gold medalist(s)	Belsy Quiñónez	Ecuador	x	x	17.07	x	16.77	x	17.07	
2nd place, silver medalist(s)	Taniele da Silva	Brazil	14.32	14.10	x	14.24	14.07	x	14.32	
3rd place, bronze medalist(s)	Agostina Pérez	Argentina	12.61	12.53	13.74	14.23	13.05	14.03	14.23	
4	Juana Checovich	Argentina	x	10.12	x	10.63	x	x	10.63	

=== Discus throw ===
17 October

Rank	Name	Nationality	#1	#2	#3	#4	#5	#6	Result	Notes
1st place, gold medalist(s)	Isabella Mosquera	Colombia	47.15	50.30	47.60	53.22	x	x	53.22	
2nd place, silver medalist(s)	Ottaynis Febres	Venezuela	48.34	50.15	50.27	50.69	x	50.29	50.69	
3rd place, bronze medalist(s)	Maria Eduarda Dantas	Brazil	47.57	50.46	49.94	x	x	50.23	50.46	
4	Belsy Quiñónez	Ecuador	x	47.17	47.31	x	49.67	46.72	49.67	
5	Ratibel Candela	Argentina	x	x	43.71	x	45.12	40.80	45.12	
6	Pilar Fernández	Uruguay	32.85	x	36.10	x	39.46	35.76	39.46	
7	Estefanie Camejo	Uruguay	31.92	34.38	x	26.66	x	x	34.38	

=== Hammer throw ===
16 October

Rank	Name	Nationality	#1	#2	#3	#4	#5	#6	Result	Notes
1st place, gold medalist(s)	Catalina Rodríguez	Colombia	x	61.53	65.96	65.83	61.73	x	65.96	
2nd place, silver medalist(s)	Yenniver Veroes	Venezuela	61.40	61.64	62.21	x	x	61.38	62.21	
3rd place, bronze medalist(s)	Agnys Eduarda	Brazil	57.16	57.89	x	59.37	61.08	x	61.08	
4	Juliana Baigorria	Argentina	56.29	57.05	x	57.97	57.46	x	57.97	
5	Denisse Medina	Ecuador	55.03	x	x	55.14	56.50	55.32	56.50	
	Florencia Sánchez	Argentina	x	x	x	x	x	x	NM	

=== Javelin throw ===
18 October

Rank	Name	Nationality	#1	#2	#3	#4	#5	#6	Result	Notes
1st place, gold medalist(s)	Manuela Rotundo	Uruguay	52.31	50.57	48.16	x	51.81	x	52.31	
2nd place, silver medalist(s)	Kimberly Flores	Peru	43.49	41.17	46.07	49.27	45.84	51.07	51.07	NR
3rd place, bronze medalist(s)	Milagros Rosas	Argentina	46.15	48.46	45.61	49.56	49.03	47.35	49.56	
4	Violeta Palacios	Argentina	40.74	41.94	38.21	x	45.28	39.83	45.28	
5	Beatriz Marafiga	Brazil	41.14	42.47	41.39	44.58	x	42.41	44.58	
6	María José Cáceres	Paraguay	41.42	41.22	41.62	39.77	x	38.52	41.62	
7	Estefanie Camejo	Uruguay	36.09	35.86	34.53	35.06	35.80	x	36.09	

=== Heptathlon ===
17–18 October

The highest mark recorded in each event is highlighted in yellow

Rank	Athlete	Nationality	100m H	HJ	SP	200m	LJ	JT	800m	Points	Notes
1st place, gold medalist(s)	Mariangelic Rojas	Venezuela	14.04	1.69	11.58	24.64	5.87w	33.62	2:27.01	5454	
2nd place, silver medalist(s)	Angelina Muga	Argentina	14.43	1.63	12.54	25.89	5.59	37.17	2:28.44	5245	
3rd place, bronze medalist(s)	Renata Godoy	Argentina	15.27	1.66	11.61	26.41	5.15w	35.16	2:23.91	4956	
4	Daniela Vaca	Bolivia	16.28	1.60	8.91	26.32	5.46w	35.57	2:32.24	4579	
5	Valentina González	Uruguay	15.23	1.42	9.04	27.28	4.96	23.70	2:41.19	3966	
6	Larissa Dutra	Brazil	18.71	1.48	11.90	28.03	5.03	35.79	3:19.04	3662	

== Mixed results ==
=== 4 × 100 metres relay ===
17 October

Rank	Lane	Nation	Competitors	Time	Notes
1st place, gold medalist(s)	6	Brazil	Jean Castro, Larissa de Jesus, Wesley Dionisio, Suellen Vitória	42.83	CR
2nd place, silver medalist(s)	3	Colombia	Enoc Marum, Marleth Ospino, Mateo Peña, Danna Banquez	43.36	
3rd place, bronze medalist(s)	5	Argentina	Tomás Villegas, Stefania Oblak, Santiago Guidetti, Julieta Telias	43.40	
4	7	Peru	Luis Humberto Angulo, Aracely Pretell, Mariano Fiol, Paula Daruich	43.84	
5	8	Chile	Tomás León, Antonia Ramírez, Benjamín Aravena, Catalina Rosas	44.00	
6	2	Paraguay	Gustavo Mongelós, Jimena Sostoa, Jhumiler Sánchez, Naira Wiebe	44.72	
7	4	Uruguay	Santiago Lazar, Guadalupe Ezquerra, Adrián Nicolari, Brandy Romero	44.90	

=== 4 × 400 metres relay ===
16 October

Rank	Lane	Nation	Competitors	Time	Notes
1st place, gold medalist(s)	3	Ecuador	Dusthyn Morquecho, Pamela Barreto, Stiven Méndez, Génesis Cañola	3:24.13	
2nd place, silver medalist(s)	7	Venezuela	Roineld Lara, Beynaili Romero, Axel Gómez, Osmary Pacheco	3:24.47	
3rd place, bronze medalist(s)	4	Brazil	Emerson Nascimento, Sabrina Pena, Renan Miguel, Júlia Ribeiro	3:24.75	
4	6	Chile	Cristobal Keim, Elisa Aguado, Manuel Guzmán, Antonia Ramírez	3:30.83	
5	5	Argentina	Iván Maidana, Candela Basaldua, Damián Suárez, Antonella Rodríguez	3:43.18	
