= Belsy Quiñónez =

Ecuadorian athletics competitor

Personal information
- Full name: Belsy Jenniffer Quiñónez Vivero
- Nationality: Ecuadorian
- Born: 30 April 2007 (age 19) San Lorenzo Canton, Ecuador

Sport
- Sport: Athletics
- Events: Shot put, discus throw
- Coached by: Francisco Saavedra; Mario Mina

Belsy Jenniffer Quiñónez Vivero (born April 30, 2007) is an Ecuadorian athlete that competes primarily in the shot put. She won a silver medal at the 2026 World Athletics U20 Championships.

== Career ==
Quiñónez started out as a boxer but gave up the sport at 15 after the death of her grandmother. She later took up athletics, starting with hammer throw before switching to shot put. She participated at the 2022 South American U18 Championships in Athletics, which was held in São Paulo, Brazil, and won a gold medal for her country in the women's shot put event after throwing the 3-kilogram shot put 14.85 meters.

At the 2025 South American U20 Championships in Athletics, Quiñónez won the women's shot put with a throw of 16.65 meters.

She also represented Ecuador in the shot put at the 2025 Junior Pan American Games in Asunción, Paraguay, where she recorded 16.40 meters and finished 3rd.

In 2026, Quiñónez competed at the 2026 World Athletics U20 Championships in Eugene, Oregon. She qualified for the women's shot put final with a throw of 17.25 meters and in the final, Quiñónez threw 17.90 meters to win the silver medal behind Nigeria's Jessica Oji, who won with 18.08 meters. Her 17.90-metre throw was recorded as an Ecuadorian under-20 national record.

== International competitions ==
Year	Competition	Venue	Position	Event	Notes
Representing Ecuador
2022	South American U18 Championships	São Paulo, Brazil	1st	Shot put (3 kg)	14.85 m
2023	South American U20 Championships	Bogotá, Colombia	2nd	Shot put	12.85 m
2023	Ibero-American U18 Championships	Lima, Peru	1st	Shot put (3 kg)	15.96 m
2023	Ibero-American U18 Championships	Lima, Peru	3rd	Discus throw	43.36 m
2024	Bolivarian Youth Games (U20)	Sucre, Bolivia	1st	Shot put	14.32 m
2024	Bolivarian Youth Games (U20)	Sucre, Bolivia	3rd	Discus throw	45.19 m
2024	South American U20 Championships	Lima, Peru	1st	Shot put	15.09 m
2024	South American U20 Championships	Lima, Peru	6th	Discus throw	43.37 m
2024	World U20 Championships	Lima, Peru	11th	Shot put	14.49 m
2024	South American U18 Championships	San Luis, Argentina	1st	Shot put (3 kg)	17.02 m
2024	South American U18 Championships	San Luis, Argentina	1st	Discus throw	43.67 m
2025	South American Championships	Mar del Plata, Argentina	6th	Shot put	15.20 m
2025	South American Championships	Mar del Plata, Argentina	8th	Discus throw	38.64 m
2025	Junior Pan American Games (U23)	Asunción, Paraguay	3rd	Shot put	16.40 m
2025	Pan American U20 Championships	Bogotá, Colombia	1st	Shot put	16.35 m
2025	South American U20 Championships	Lima, Peru	1st	Shot put	16.65 m
2025	South American U20 Championships	Lima, Peru	4th	Discus throw	43.03 m
2025	Bolivarian Games	Lima, Peru	4th	Shot put	16.75 m
2026	Ibero-American Championships	Lima, Peru	2nd	Shot put	17.63 m
2026	Ibero-American U20 Championships	Lima, Peru	1st	Shot put	16.84 m
2026	Pan American Championships	Medellín, Colombia	5th	Shot put	16.92 m
2026	World U20 Championships	Eugene, United States	2nd	Shot put	17.90 m
2026	South American Games	Santa Fe, Argentina	5th	Discus throw	47.67 m
2026	South American U23 Championships	Santa Fe, Argentina	1st	Shot put	17.07 m
2026	South American U23 Championships	Santa Fe, Argentina	4th	Discus throw	49.67 m
