= María Maturana =

Colombian sprinter (born 2006)

Personal information
- Full name: María Camila Maturana
- Born: 21 November 2006 (age 19)

Sport
- Country: Colombia
- Sport: Athletics
- Events: 100 metres; 200 metres; 4 × 100 metres relay

Achievements and titles
- Personal bests: 100 metres: 11.17 NR (2026); 200 metres: 23.18 (2026); 4×100 metres: 43.92 (2026)
Medal record
Representing Colombia
Women's athletics
Event	1st	2nd	3rd
Ibero-American Championships	0	1	0
South American Games	1	0	0
Bolivarian Games	1	0	1
Pan American U20 Championships	2	1	0
South American U20 Championships	3	1	1
Total	7	3	2
Ibero-American Championships
Silver medal – second place	2026 Lima	100 m
South American Games
Gold medal – first place	2026 Santa Fe	4×100 m relay
Bolivarian Games
Gold medal – first place	2025 Lima-Ayacucho	4×100 m relay
Bronze medal – third place	2025 Lima-Ayacucho	200 m
Pan American U20 Championships
Gold medal – first place	2025 Bogotá	100 m
Gold medal – first place	2025 Bogotá	200 m
Silver medal – second place	2025 Bogotá	4×100 m relay
South American U20 Championships
Gold medal – first place	2025 Lima	100 m
Gold medal – first place	2025 Lima	200 m
Gold medal – first place	2025 Lima	4×100 m relay
Silver medal – second place	2024 Lima	100 m
Bronze medal – third place	2024 Lima	4×100 m relay

María Camila Maturana (born 21 November 2006) is a Colombian sprinter. She is the Colombian national record holder over 100 metres.

== Biography ==
From Antioquia, she trained in Carepa as part of the Colombian Ministry of Sport talent programme. She won the silver medal in the 100 metres at the 2024 South American U20 Championships in Athletics and represented Colombia at the 2024 World Athletics U20 Championships.

She won gold medals over both 100 metres and 200 metres at the 2025 Pan American U20 Athletics Championships in Bogotá, finishing ahead of Frances Colon of Puerto Rico in both sprint finals. Competing at the 2025 South American U20 Championships in Athletics in Lima, Peru, she again won both 100 metres and 200 metres gold medals, and was part of the Colombian gold medal-winning 4 × 100 m relay team.

In May 2026, she won the 100 metres silver medal at the 2026 Ibero-American Championships in Athletics in Lima, Peru, finishing behind Ana Carolina Azevedo of Brazil in a new Colombian national record of 11.17 seconds, surpassing the two-decade old record previously held by Felipa Palacios.

== International competitions ==
Year	Competition	Venue	Position	Event	Result
Representing Colombia
2024	South American U20 Championships	Lima, Peru	2nd	100 m	11.85 s
2024	South American U20 Championships	Lima, Peru	3rd	4 × 100 m relay	46.55 s
2024	World U20 Championships	Lima, Peru	37th (h)	100 m	12.08 s
2025	Pan American U20 Championships	Bogotá, Colombia	1st	100 m	11.39 s
2025	Pan American U20 Championships	Bogotá, Colombia	1st	200 m	23.36 s
2025	Pan American U20 Championships	Bogotá, Colombia	2nd	4 × 100 m relay	45.47 s
2025	South American U20 Championships	Lima, Peru	1st	100 m	11.29 s
2025	South American U20 Championships	Lima, Peru	1st	200 m	23.39 s
2025	South American U20 Championships	Lima, Peru	1st	4 × 100 m relay	45.79 s
2025	Bolivarian Games	Lima, Peru	3rd	200 m	23.55 s
2025	Bolivarian Games	Lima, Peru	1st	4 × 100 m relay	44.00 s
2026	Ibero-American Championships	Lima, Peru	2nd	100 m	11.17 s NR
2026	Ibero-American Championships	Lima, Peru	5th	200 m	23.00 s w
2026	Pan American Championships	Medellín, Colombia	—N/a	100 m	DNF
2026	Central American and Caribbean Games	Santo Domingo, Dominican Republic	13th (sf)	100 m	11.76 s
2026	Central American and Caribbean Games	Santo Domingo, Dominican Republic	5th	4 × 100 m relay	43.92 s
2026	South American Games	Santa Fe, Argentina	7th	100 m	11.76 s
2026	South American Games	Santa Fe, Argentina		4 × 100 m relay	–
