= Athletics at the 2024 Bolivarian Youth Games =

Athletics competitions at the 2024 Bolivarian Youth Games

- Athletics pictogram
- Venue: Estadio Olímpico Patria
- Dates: 11–14 April
- Competitors: 164 from 7 nations

Athletics competitions at the 2024 Bolivarian Youth Games in Sucre, Bolivia, were held from 11 to 14 April 2024 at Estadio Olímpico Patria.

Forty three medal events were scheduled to be contested: 42 events equally divided among boys and girls plus a 4 × 400 metres relay mixed event. A total of 164 athletes (86 boys and 78 girls) competed in the events. Athletes had to be born between 1 January 2005 and 31 December 2008 to be eligible (ages 16 to 19), that is, they must belong to the U20 category.

== Participating nations ==
All 7 ODEBO National Olympic Committees (NOCs) registered athletes for the athletics competitions. Each NOC was able to enter a maximum of 36 athletes (18 per gender), with up to two athletes for each boys and girls individual events and one team for each relay event. Athletes belonging to the U18 category (16 and 17 years old) could compete in any event, but no U18 athlete could compete in more than one event of a distance greater than 200 metres on the same day.

Numbers in parentheses indicate the number of athletes entered the competition by each NOC.

- Bolivia (33)
- Chile (26)
- Colombia (32)
- Ecuador (12)
- Panama (8)
- Peru (29)
- Venezuela (24)

== Medal summary ==
=== Medal table ===
* Host nation (Bolivia)

Rank	NOC	Gold	Silver	Bronze	Total
1	Colombia (COL)	12	5	15	32
2	Chile (CHI)	11	12	6	29
3	Ecuador (ECU)	7	4	3	14
4	Venezuela (VEN)	6	10	4	20
5	Peru (PER)	4	7	10	21
6	Bolivia (BOL)*	0	1	1	2
Totals (6 entries)		40	39	39	118

Source: I Bolivarian Youth Games Sucre 2024 – Athletics medals

=== Medalists ===
==== Boys' events ====
Event	Gold		Silver		Bronze	
100 metres	Benjamín Aravena; Chile	10.35	Aron Earl; Peru	10.51	Hugo Thyme; Colombia	10.73
200 metres	Benjamín Aravena; Chile	20.75	Axel Gómez; Venezuela	21.18	Hugo Thyme; Colombia	21.29
400 metres	Ian Andrey Pata; Ecuador	47.41	Axel Gómez; Venezuela	48.26	Santiago Leal; Colombia	48.53
800 metres	Jhoiner Delgado; Venezuela	1:54.64	Lucas Jara; Chile	1:55.32	Giancarlo Bravo; Peru	1:56.31
1500 metres	Lucas Jara; Chile	4:06.77	Sebastián Dossow; Chile	4:07.55	Thomas Castro; Colombia	4:08.03
3000 metres	Luis Gustavo Huamán; Peru	8:55.08	Thomas Castro; Colombia	8:55.22	Jessiel Paez; Ecuador	9:00.66
5000 metres	Luis Gustavo Huamán; Peru	15:34.25	Brayan Huanca; Peru	15:36.09	Dylan Carrasco; Colombia	15:36.21
110 metres hurdles	Roger Rodríguez; Ecuador	13.80	Alonso Quiroz; Peru	13.90	Ramón Fuenzalida; Chile	14.07
400 metres hurdles	Ramón Fuenzalida; Chile	51.93	Ian Andrey Pata; Ecuador	52.05	Santiago Quintero; Venezuela	
3000 metres steeplechase	Lizardo Huamaní; Peru	10:04.29	Deangelo Cadima; Bolivia	10:26.54	Julio Espinoza; Chile	10:55.02
4 × 100 metres relay	Chile; Gonzalo Mena; Benjamín Aravena; Martín Villegas; Ramón Fuenzalida	41.52	Venezuela; Ángel Ramírez; Axel Gómez; Santiago Quintero; Sebastian Gómez	41.99	Peru; Nicolás Sánchez; Mariano Fiol; Jeffrey Cajo; Aron Earl	42.03
10 kilometres walk	Ivan Darío Oña; Ecuador	45:08.18	Jesús Ramirez; Colombia	45:54.02	Juan Pablo Rojas; Colombia	46:35.50
High jump	Cristóbal Sahurie; Chile	2.10 m	Jholeixon Rodríguez; Ecuador	2.04 m	Héctor Añez; Venezuela	1.95 m
Pole vault	Leonardo Olate; Chile	4.40 m	No silver and bronze medals were awarded (NM).			
Long jump	Ángel Ramírez; Venezuela	7.00 m	Gonzalo Mena; Chile	6.98 m	Santiago Theran; Colombia	6.77 m
Triple jump						
Shot put	Erick Caicedo; Ecuador	16.71 m	Kevin Huang Huang; Chile	15.51 m	Juan David Montaño; Colombia	15.33 m
Discus throw	Juan David Montaño; Colombia	57.97 m	Alan Fell; Chile	53.41 m	Kevin Huang Huang; Chile	47.96 m
Hammer throw	Benjamín Muñoz; Chile	68.81 m	Cipriano Riquelme; Chile	66.40 m	Juan Sebastián Scarpetta; Colombia	65.81 m
Javelin throw	Orlando Fernández; Venezuela	71.59 m	Pablo Frutos; Chile	60.75 m	Santiago Pimentel; Colombia	56.03 m
Decathlon	Max Moraga; Chile	6859 pts	Facundo Millán; Chile	6566 pts	Antoni Estrada; Venezuela	6054 pts

==== Girls' events ====
Event	Gold		Silver		Bronze	
100 metres	Antonia Ramírez; Chile	11.76	Beynailis Romero; Venezuela	11.86	Cayetana Chirinos; Peru	11.87
200 metres	Antonia Ramírez; Chile	23.61	Beynailis Romero; Venezuela	23.70	Dana Jiménez; Colombia	23.94
400 metres	Paola Loboa; Colombia	53.84	Nahomy Castro; Colombia	54.10	Maria Celeste Rojas; Venezuela	56.01
800 metres	Luciana Fernández; Peru	2:12.30	Maria Celeste Rojas; Venezuela	2:12.50	Jacoba Goicochea; Peru	2:14.55
1500 metres	Karol Luna; Colombia	04:50.90	Dayana Flores; Peru	04:52.67	Laura Camargo; Colombia	04:52.75
3000 metres	Karol Luna; Colombia	11:46.48	Luz Arias; Peru	11:55.14	Alison Guamán; Ecuador	12:26.85
5000 metres						
100 metres hurdles	Luciana Zapata; Colombia	14.12	Catalina Rozas; Chile	14.16	María Paula Reinoso; Colombia	15.22
400 metres hurdles	Yariana Carpio; Venezuela	1:02.15	Ximena Vásquez; Peru	1:06.37	Luciana Estrada; Bolivia	1:08.18
3000 metres steeplechase	Laura Camargo; Colombia	11:22.47	Salicia Salcedo; Peru	12:10.74	Ytala Canchanya; Peru	12:41.12
4 × 100 metres relay	Venezuela; Glanyernis Guerra; Orihana Guzmán; Nahomy García; Beynailis Romero	46.05	Chile; Jacinta Philipps; Antonia Ramírez; Catalina Heilenkotter; Blanca Yarur	46.06	Peru; Daniela Salazar; Bianca Conroy; Adriana Chávez; Cayetana Chirinos	46.90
10 kilometres walk	Ruby Segura; Colombia	52:10.75	Katherine Barreto; Ecuador	54:04.07	Yadira Orihuela; Peru	55:06.27
High jump	María Arboleda; Colombia	1.86 m	Katherine Desiderio; Ecuador	1.72 m	María Baboun; Chile	1.60 m
Pole vault	Luna Pabón; Colombia	3.60 m	Asunción Dreyfus; Chile	3.10 m	Mariana Minchola; Peru	2.90 m
Long jump	Dana Jiménez; Colombia	5.92 m	Matilde Tejos; Chile	5.66 m	Angie Rivas; Colombia	5.64 m
Triple jump	Sylvana Behile; Ecuador	12.98 m	Valery Arce; Colombia	12.97 m	Matilde Tejos; Chile	12.43 m
Shot put	Belsy Quiñónez; Ecuador	14.32 m	Luisanyz Fuentes; Venezuela	13.67 m	Sury Murillo; Colombia	12.87 m
Discus throw	Angélica Caicedo; Colombia	47.81 m	Ottaynis Febres; Venezuela	46.94 m	Belsy Quiñónez; Ecuador	45.19 m
Hammer throw	Yenniver Veroes; Venezuela	62.29 m	Karol Hurtado; Colombia	51.37 m	Catalina Heilenkotter; Chile	47.64 m
Javelin throw	Hashly Ayoví; Ecuador	49.71 m	Arianny Rojas; Venezuela	45.78 m	Kimberly Flores; Peru	41.69 m
Heptathlon						

==== Mixed event ====
Event	Gold		Silver		Bronze	
4 × 400 metres relay	Colombia; Esteban Bermúdez; Paola Loboa; Óscar Leal; Nahomy Castro	3:27.62	Venezuela; Royber Montes; María Rojas; Roineld Lara; Yariana Carpio	3:36.46	Peru; Anderson Távara; Emilia Martínez; Jeffrey Cajo; Luciana Fernández	3:40.79
