= 2024 South American U20 Championships in Athletics =

XLVI South American U20 Championships in Athletics
- Dates: 12–14 July
- Host city: Lima, Peru
- Venue: Villa Deportiva Nacional
- Level: U20
- Events: 45
- Participation: 13 nations

The 46th South American U20 Championships in Athletics were held at Villa Deportiva Nacional in Lima, Peru, on 20 and 21 July.

== Medal summary ==
=== Men ===
Event	Gold		Silver		Bronze	
100 metres (-0.6 m/s)	Benjamín Aravena; Chile	10.65	Aron Earl; Peru	10.66	Tomás Mondino; Argentina	10.82
200 metres (–0.5 m/s)	Benjamín Aravena; Chile	21.62	Wesley da Silva; Brazil	21.66	Paulo Batista; Brazil	21.73
400 metres	Malachi Austin; Guyana	47.21	Ian Andrey Pata; Ecuador	47.69	Vinícius Galeno; Brazil	48.29
800 metres	Uriel Muñoz; Argentina	1:51.22	Lucas Jara; Chile	1:51.84	Bryan Alves; Brazil	1:52.00
1500 metres	Uriel Muñoz; Argentina	3:55.82	Lucas Jara; Chile	3:56.31	Luis Huamán; Peru	3:57.48
3000 metres	Luis Huamán; Peru	8:38.31	Manuel Rojas; Argentina	8:39.08	Brayan Huanca; Peru	8:40.90
5000 metres	Kheny Meneses; Peru	14:27.60	Manuel Rojas; Argentina	14:28.44	Brayan Huanca; Peru	14:39.97
110 metres hurdles (99 cm) (-0.5 m/s)	Vinícius de Brito; Brazil	13.86	Odair de Aguiar Jr. Brazil	14.09	Gerónimo Canizales; Colombia	14.17
400 metres hurdles	José David Mosquera; Colombia	52.11 PB	Ramón Fuenzalida; Chile	52.46	Ian Andrey Pata; Ecuador	52.86
3000 m steeplechase	Samuel Santana; Brazil	9:08.79	Leonardo Guerrero; Argentina	9:13.4	Julio Espinoza; Chile	9:27.3
4 × 100 m relay	Brazil; Murilo Silva; Wesley da Silva; Renan Akamine; Paulo Henrique Batista	41.20	Argentina; Francisco Ferreccio; Diego Pérez; Manuel Juárez; Tomás Mondino	41.47	Ecuador; José Luis Guevara; Ian Andrey Pata; Johnny Ramírez; Roy Jair Chila	41.84
4 × 400 m relay	Brazil; Vinícius Galeno; Bryan Alves; Lucas Rosa; Carlos Eduardo Domingos	3:14.63	Argentina; Manuel Juárez; Diego Pérez; Tomás Mirón; Tomás Mondino	3:14.94	Colombia; Esteban Bermúdez; Héctor Barrios; José David Mosquera; Óscar Leal	3:16.48
10,000 m walk	Jesús Ramírez; Colombia	43:06.71 PB	Julián Alfonso; Colombia	43:07.55 PB	Iván Oña; Ecuador	43:25.79
High jump	Jholeixon Rodríguez; Ecuador	2.01	Janer Caicedo; Colombia	1.95	Eric Cardoso; Brazil	1.95
Pole vault	Pedro Aparecido; Brazil	4.70	Andrés Torres; Colombia	4.40	Only two athletes with valid marks	
Long jump	Murilo Silva; Brazil	7.32	Renan Akamine; Brazil	7.08	Christopher Thiessen; Paraguay	7.01
Triple jump	Santiago Theran; Colombia	15.56 PB	Gilvan da Costa; Brazil	15.52	Roy Jair Chila; Ecuador	14.98
Shot put (6 kg)	Alessandro Soares; Brazil	18.48	Erik Caicedo; Ecuador	17.02	Pedro Modesto; Brazil	16.79
Discus throw (1.75 kg)	Juan David Montaño; Colombia	60.29 PB	Alberto Rodrigues; Brazil	58.56	Alan Fell; Chile	53.88
Hammer throw (6 kg)	Cipriano Riquelme; Chile	68.19	Juan Sebastián Scarpetta; Colombia	68.16 PB	Eduardo Fernandes; Brazil	66.33
Javelin throw	Yirmar Torres; Ecuador	73.21	Arthur Curvo; Brazil	71.90	Orlando Fernández; Venezuela	67.70
Decathlon (U20)	Romeo Männel; Paraguay	6868	Edgar Rosabal; Uruguay	6802	Facundo Millan; Chile	6398
WR world record | AR area record | CR championship record | GR games record | NR national record | OR Olympic record | PB personal best | SB season best | WL world leading (in a given season)

=== Women ===
Event	Gold		Silver		Bronze	
100 metres ( +0.4 m/s)	Atheleyha Hinckson; Guyana	11.76	María Maturana; Colombia	11.85 PB	Vanessa dos Santos; Brazil	11.86
200 metres (0.0 m/s)	Antonia Ramírez; Chile	24.24	Dana Jiménez; Colombia	24.32	Hakelly da Silva; Brazil	24.41
400 metres	Julia Ribeiro; Brazil	54.32	Nahomy Castro; Colombia	54.87	Tianna Springer; Guyana	55.12
800 metres	Isabel Conde; Argentina	2:06.00	Sabrina Pena; Brazil	2:08.57	Luise Braga; Brazil	2:09.20
1500 metres	Vanessa Alder; Ecuador	4:28.07	Lily Alder; Ecuador	4:28.30	Luise Braga; Brazil	4:28.96
3000 metres	Vanessa Alder; Ecuador	9:50.61	Karol Luna; Colombia	9:51.41 PB	Luz Arias; Peru	9:51.88
5000 metres	Luz Arias; Peru	17:07.70	Alison Guamán; Ecuador	17:11.07	Lilian Mateo; Bolivia	17:17.62
100 metres hurdles (-1.2 m/s)	Helen Bernard; Argentina	13.82	Catalina Rozas; Chile	13.90	Luciana Zapata; Colombia	13.93
400 metres hurdles	Amanda da Silva; Brazil	59.63	Paola Loboa; Colombia	1:00.13	Helen Bernard; Argentina	1:00.19
3000 m steeplechase	Alison Guamán; Ecuador	10:35.97	Laura Camargo; Colombia	10:44.78	Rusell Cjuro; Peru	10:50.40
4 × 100 m relay	Brazil; Beatriz Silva; Vanessa dos Santos; Pietra Simões; Hakelly da Silva	46.15	Chile; Sofia Segura; Antonia Ramírez; Catalina Rozas; Blanca Yarur	46.23	Colombia; Luciana Zapata; Dana Jiménez; María Maturana; Stefany Julio	46.55
4 × 400 m relay	Colombia; Isabella Hurtado; Lenis Rivas; Nahomy Castro; Paola Loboa	3:43.24	Argentina; Helen Bernard; Juana Zuberbuhler; Malena Galván; Isabel Conde	3:45.22	Brazil; Beatriz Silva; Nykolli Rangel; Maria Eduarda de Oliveira; Julia Ribeiro	3:47.86
10,000 m walk	Ruby Segura; Colombia	48:26.39 PB	Katherine Barreto; Ecuador	50:47.23	María Elena Potilla; Ecuador	51:43.53
High jump	María Arboleda; Colombia	1.82	Maria Eduarda de Oliveira; Brazil	1.76	Luisa Lopes; Brazil	1.70
Pole vault	Carolina Scarponi; Argentina	3.80	Júlia Calabretti; Brazil	3.80	Luna Pabón; Colombia; Luiza Batista; Brazil	3.60
Long jump	Vanessa Sena; Brazil	6.17	Dana Jiménez; Colombia	6.05	Victoria Zanolli; Argentina	5.84
Triple jump	Sylvana Behile; Ecuador	12.96	Valery Arce; Colombia	12.43	Noemi Caicedo; Ecuador	12.10
Shot put	Belsy Quiñónez; Ecuador	15.09	Edimara de Jesus; Brazil	14.51	Natalia Cardoso; Brazil	14.15
Discus throw	Ottaynis Febres; Venezuela	47.52	Stefania Mena; Colombia	47.33	Samanta Lopes; Brazil	46.78
Hammer throw	Giuliana Baigorria; Argentina	57.62	Kimberly Assiz; Brazil	55.04	Florencia Sánchez; Argentina	52.68
Javelin throw	Milagros Rosas; Argentina	47.52	Malena Cordoba; Argentina	46.36	Hashly Ayovi; Ecuador	45.02
Heptathlon	Renata Godoy; Argentina	5062	Isabela Teixeira; Brazil	4954	Julia Leite; Brazil	4917
WR world record | AR area record | CR championship record | GR games record | NR national record | OR Olympic record | PB personal best | SB season best | WL world leading (in a given season)

=== Mixed ===
Event	Gold		Silver		Bronze	
4 × 400 m relay	Colombia; Óscar Leal; Isabella Hurtado; José David Mosquera; Paola Loboa	3:24.31	Argentina; Tomás Mirón; Malena Galván; Isabel Conde; Manuel Juárez	3:27.72	Ecuador; Elias Cañola; Genesis Cañola; Ian Andrey Pata; Xiomara Ibarra	3:28.80

== Medal table ==
* Host nation (Peru)

Rank	Nation	Gold	Silver	Bronze	Total
1	Brazil (BRA)	11	12	16	39
2	Colombia (COL)	8	13	5	26
3	Argentina (ARG)	8	8	4	20
4	Ecuador (ECU)	7	5	8	20
5	Chile (CHI)	4	5	3	12
6	Peru (PER)*	3	1	5	9
7	Guyana (GUY)	2	0	1	3
8	Paraguay (PAR)	1	0	1	2
8	Venezuela (VEN)	1	0	1	2
10	Uruguay (URU)	0	1	0	1
11	Bolivia (BOL)	0	0	1	1
Totals (11 entries)		45	45	45	135
