= 2025 South American U20 Championships in Athletics =

XLVII South American U20 Championships in Athletics
- Dates: 31 October – 2 November
- Host city: Lima, Peru
- Venue: Villa Deportiva Nacional
- Level: U20
- Events: 45
- Participation: 11 nations

The 47th South American U20 Championships in Athletics were held at Villa Deportiva Nacional in Lima, Peru, on 20 and 21 July.

== Medal summary ==
=== Men ===
Event	Gold		Silver		Bronze	
100 metres (+1.9 m/s)	Michael Araújo; Brazil	10.20	Deiner Guaitoto; Colombia	10.20	Mariano Fiol; Peru	10.46
200 metres (+1.9 m/s)	Deiner Guaitoto; Colombia	21.06	Michael Araújo; Brazil	21.29	Tomás León; Chile	21.37
400 metres	Victor dos Santos; Brazil	47.11	Ian Andrey Pata; Ecuador	47.51	Manuel Juárez; Argentina	47.56
800 metres	Giancarlo Bravo; Peru	1:50.86	Carlos Domingos; Brazil	1:51.64	Javon Roberts; Guyana	1:51.98
1500 metres	Pablo Ñauta; Ecuador	3:54.25	Edwar Marquez; Peru	3:55.78	Dylan Carrasco; Colombia	3:55.80
3000 metres	Jessiel Páez; Ecuador	8:14.43	Edwar Marquez; Peru	8:14.50	Francisco Zufiaurre; Argentina	8:14.83
5000 metres	Jessiel Páez; Ecuador	15:14.08	Francisco Zufiaurre; Argentina	15:14.68	Brayan Huanca; Peru	15:15.39
110 metres hurdles (99 cm) (+3.5 m/s)	Vinícius de Brito; Brazil	13.27	Roger Rodríguez; Ecuador	13.36	Odair de Aguiar; Brazil	13.46
400 metres hurdles	Ramón Fuenzalida; Chile	51.20	Victor dos Santos; Brazil	51.71	Ian Andrey Pata; Ecuador	51.86
3000 m steeplechase	Cael Pinto; Brazil	9:13.58	Wilmer Santos; Bolivia	9:15.33	Gustavo da Silva; Brazil	9:19.55
4 × 100 m relay	Colombia; Sebastián Palomeque; Yeison González; Yilmer Olano; Deiner Guaitoto	40.50	Brazil; Michael Araújo; Vinicius De Brito; Renan Akamine; Victor dos Santos	40.77	Chile; Franco Stefoni; Lucas Moreno; Pelayo Garcia; Tomás León	41.02
4 × 400 m relay	Guyana; Tishawn Easton; Kaidon Persaud; Skylar Charles; Javon Roberts	3:14.40	Colombia; Camilo Redondo; José Miguel Valencia; Brayan Córdoba; Juan Sebastián Sánchez	3:14.87	Brazil; Wilton Souza; Weslei Cavalcante; Paulo Henrique Batista; Carlos Domingos	3:15.02
5000 m walk	Iván Oña; Ecuador	20:12.69	José Duvan Ccoscco; Peru	20:20.69	Juan Pablo Rojas; Colombia	20:46.77
High jump	Dereck Martins; Brazil	2.12	Deyvid Lara; Ecuador	2.06	Janer Caicedo; Colombia	2.06
Pole vault	Andrés Torres; Colombia	4.80	Andy Espinoza; Ecuador	4.80	Kauan Batista; Brazil	4.50
Long jump	Renan Akamine; Brazil	7.61	Alexander Villalba; Paraguay	7.32w	Brayan Piñeros; Colombia	7.08
Triple jump	Luan Souza; Brazil	15.76 w	Alexander Santa Cruz; Brazil	15.64 w	Deyvid Lara; Ecuador	15.51 w
Shot put (6 kg)	Alessandro Soares; Brazil	19.61	Alberto dos Santos; Brazil	17.85	Ricardo Lobos; Chile	17.19
Discus throw (1.75 kg)	Alberto dos Santos; Brazil	57.52	Luis Humberto Fossa; Peru	54.70	Lucas Miño; Argentina	53.51
Hammer throw (6 kg)	Nicolás Vergara; Chile	65.76	Felipe Melguizo; Colombia	61.97	Patry Váldez; Ecuador	61.74
Javelin throw	Thiago Lacerda; Brazil	75.71	Eduardo Radatz; Brazil	63.74	Kevin Machado; Uruguay	59.75
Decathlon (U20)	Max Moraga; Chile	7212	Henrique Pinto; Brazil	6774	Jholeixon Rodríguez; Ecuador	6469
WR world record | AR area record | CR championship record | GR games record | NR national record | OR Olympic record | PB personal best | SB season best | WL world leading (in a given season)

=== Women ===
Event	Gold		Silver		Bronze	
100 metres ( +1.9 m/s)	María Maturana; Colombia	11.29	Roxana Ramírez; Chile	11.47	Hakelly da Silva; Brazil	11.61
200 metres (+1.8 m/s)	María Maturana; Colombia	23.39	Hakelly da Silva; Brazil	23.78	Pilar Rodríguez; Chile	24.10
400 metres	Génesis Cañola; Ecuador	53.93	Isabella Hurtado; Colombia	54.92	Elisa Aguado; Chile	55.00
800 metres	Pamela Barreto; Ecuador	2:08.53	Juana Zuberbuhler; Argentina	2:09.55	Luise Braga; Brazil	2:10.09
1500 metres	Juana Zuberbuhler; Argentina	4:35.96	Karol Luna; Colombia	4:38.31	Luise Braga; Brazil	4:40.35
3000 metres	Irene Pernia; Argentina	9:50.71	Karol Luna; Colombia	9:51.38	Valentina Velardez; Argentina	9:54.42
5000 metres	Ruth Aguilar; Peru	17:37.31	Jomayra Tite; Ecuador	17:38.72	Soury Flores; Peru	17:39.46
100 metres hurdles (+2.0 m/s)	Pietra Simões; Brazil	13.56	Catalina Rozas; Chile	13.57	Beatriz Silva; Brazil	13.67
400 metres hurdles	Nykolli Rangel; Brazil	60.14	Tatiana Díaz; Ecuador	60.72	Amanda da Silva; Brazil	61.48
3000 m steeplechase	Erika Torres; Colombia	10:57.56	Nicole Faria; Brazil	11:01.93	Jomayra Tite; Ecuador	11:03.15
4 × 100 m relay	Colombia; Angie Amhuila; Yessica Sánchez; Yesenia Sánchez; María Maturana	45.79	Brazil; Pietra Simões; Victoria de Almeida; Hemily Santos; Hakelly da Silva	46.13	Chile; Isidora Corada; Pilar Rodríguez; Catalina Rozas; Roxana Ramírez	46.32
4 × 400 m relay	Colombia; Laura Alcalá; Sara Cuesta; Isabella Hurtado; Michel Gómez	3:43.67	Argentina; Tatiana Díaz; Pamela Barreto; Kristel Méndez; Génesis Cañola	3:43.97	Brazil; Hemily Santos; Julia Santos; Nykolli Rangel; Letícia Lopes	3:47.07
5000 m walk	Ruby Segura; Colombia	22:23.84	Estrella Rojas; Peru	22:33.07	Karen Litardo; Ecuador	22:41.61
High jump	Maria Eduarda de Oliveira; Brazil	1.80	Jeraldine Pata; Ecuador	1.74	Samira De Araújo; Brazil	1.71
Pole vault	Luna Pabón; Colombia	3.95	Rafaela Neri; Brazil	3.85	María Fernanda Gómez; Colombia	3.70
Long jump	Wanda da Silva; Brazil	6.19	Sofía Contreras; Chile	6.19	Milagros D'Amico; Argentina	6.02
Triple jump	Karine Estefabe; Brazil	13.15	Sofía Contreras; Chile	12.91w	Valery Arce; Colombia	12.73w
Shot put	Belsy Quiñónez; Ecuador	16.65	Samanta Lopes; Brazil	13.46	Kauane Padilha; Brazil	12.92
Discus throw	Samanta Lopes; Brazil	51.94	Valery Franco; Colombia	45.56	Raissa de Lima; Brazil	45.47
Hammer throw	Carmela Cocco; Argentina	56.37	Kimberly Assiz; Brazil	56.24	Marly Herrera; Ecuador	54.08
Javelin throw	Kimberly Flores; Peru	50.01 NR	Milagros Rosas; Argentina	48.53	Beatriz Cleudo; Brazil	46.30
Heptathlon	Beatriz Aranha; Brazil	4824	Brianna Morocho; Ecuador	4729	Malena Bustamante; Argentina	4527
WR world record | AR area record | CR championship record | GR games record | NR national record | OR Olympic record | PB personal best | SB season best | WL world leading (in a given season)

=== Mixed ===
Event	Gold		Silver		Bronze	
4 × 400 m relay	Ecuador; Justin Albarez; Pamela Barreto; Ian Andrey Pata; Génesis Cañola	3:24.77	Colombia; Brayan Córdoba; Sara Cuesta; Juan Sebastián Sánchez; Isabella Hurtado	3:25.65	Chile; Ramón Fuenzalida; Elena Oyarzun; Max Moraga; Elisa Aguado	3:25.73

== Medal table ==
* Host nation (Peru)

Rank	Nation	Gold	Silver	Bronze	Total
1	Brazil (BRA)	17	14	14	45
2	Colombia (COL)	10	8	6	24
3	Ecuador (ECU)	8	8	7	23
4	Peru (PER)*	3	5	3	11
5	Chile (CHI)	3	4	7	14
6	Argentina (ARG)	3	4	6	13
7	Guyana (GUY)	1	0	1	2
8	Bolivia (BOL)	0	1	0	1
8	Paraguay (PAR)	0	1	0	1
10	Uruguay (URU)	0	0	1	1
11	Suriname (SUR)	0	0	0	0
Totals (11 entries)		45	45	45	135
