= 2026 World Athletics U20 Championships – Women's shot put =

Women's shot put at the 2026 World Athletics U20 Championships
- Venue: Hayward Field
- Dates: 6 August (Final)
- Competitors: 37 from 27 nations
- Winning distance: 18.08 m

Medalists
gold medal	Jessica Oji	Nigeria
silver medal	Belsy Quiñónez	Ecuador
bronze medal	Emily Scherf	Germany

The women's shot put at the 2026 World Athletics U20 Championships was held at Hayward Field in Eugene, United States on 8 August 2026.

== Records ==
U20 standing records prior to the 2026 World Athletics U20 Championships were as follows:

Record	Athlete & Nationality	Mark	Location	Date
World U20 Record	Astrid Kumbernuss (GDR)	20.54 m	Orimattila, Finland	1 July 1989
Championship Record	Cheng Xiaoyan (CHN)	18.76 m	Lisbon, Portugal	21 July 1994
World U20 Leading	Jessica Oji (NGR)	18.50 m	New York City, United States	1 March 2026

== Results ==
=== Qualification ===
Qualification took place in the morning session on 6 August 2026.

==== Group A ====
Place	Athlete	Nation	Round			Mark	Notes
Place	Athlete	Nation	#1	#2	#3	Mark	Notes
1	Jessica Oji	Nigeria	17.56			17.56	Q, NU20R
2	Belsy Quiñónez	Ecuador	17.25			17.25	Q
3	Maria Rafailidou	Greece	15.12	15.94	15.90	15.94	q
4	Able Deborah Mills	Jamaica	13.95	x	15.84	15.84 m	q
5	Anita Nalesso	Italy	15.72	15.69	15.78	15.78	q
6	He Yuxiao	China	15.55	x	x	15.55	q
7	Kinga Jackowska	Poland	14.20	15.45	12.81	15.45	q
8	Nafy Thiam	Belgium	15.26	14.75	x	15.26	
9	Anshu	India	14.91	14.78	15.24	15.24	
10	Antonia Heberle	Germany	15.03	x	x	15.03	
11	Manaia Coulter	Australia	14.26	14.26	14.99	14.99	PB
12	Addy MacArthur	United States	14.10	14.50	14.94	14.94	
13	Edimara Alves	Brazil	14.32	14.76	14.87	14.87	SB
14	Yae-ram Lee	South Korea	13.75	14.79	x	14.79	
15	Zerina Bešlija	Bosnia and Herzegovina	13.97	14.43	13.55	14.43	
16	Zara Veltruski	Croatia	13.41	13.28	14.18	14.18	
17	Karmen-Elizabeth Maritz	New Zealand	14.11	13.89	14.14	14.14	
18	Fortune Cletus-Okolo	South Africa	13.61	13.00	13.68	13.68	
19	Talia Phangura	Canada	11.89	13.37	x	13.37	

==== Group B ====
Place	Athlete	Nation	Round			Mark	Notes
Place	Athlete	Nation	#1	#2	#3	Mark	Notes
1	Emily Scherf	Germany	16.58			16.58	Q
2	Maryann MacEdru	Fiji	16.04			16.04	Q, NU20R
3	Jaslene Massey	United States	x	15.99	-	15.99	q
4	Elettra Bernardis	Italy	15.19	15.91	15.08	15.91	q, PB
5	Anhelina Shepel	Ukraine	15.14	15.88	x	15.88	q
6	Aleksandra Trifunović	Serbia	14.93	15.11	15.11	15.11	
7	Johanne Lamprecht	South Africa	14.91	14.78	15.04	15.04	PB
8	Lauren Kelly	Australia	x	14.87	x	14.87	
9	Zhai Xiaohan	China	14.83	x	14.54	14.83	
10	Alani Dumbuya	Great Britain	14.41	14.37	x	14.41	
11	Iga Wysoczańska	Poland	14.37	13.31	14.32	14.37	
12	Adina Ionela Fîrțală	Romania	x	x	14.27	14.27	
13	Kate Hallie	New Zealand	13.81	x	14.12	14.12	
14	Kendra Silvery Duany	Mexico	13.45	13.95	13.98	13.98	
15	Anastasia Mihaela Andreadi	Greece	x	13.71	13.83	13.83	
16	Andrea Njimi Tankeu Djeudji	Spain	12.81	13.29	13.06	13.29	
17	Mejrema Baručija	Bosnia and Herzegovina	x	x	13.06	13.06	
18	Emma Louisa Papalii	Cook Islands	x	x	11.96	11.96	

=== Final ===
The final took place in the afternoon session on 6 August 2026.

Place	Athlete	Nation	Round						Mark	Notes
Place	Athlete	Nation	#1	#2	#3	#4	#5	#6	Mark	Notes
1st place, gold medalist(s)	Jessica Oji	Nigeria	18.05	18.08	17.95	x	x	18.07	18.08 m	
2nd place, silver medalist(s)	Belsy Quiñónez	Ecuador	17.90	17.59	x	17.22	16.90	17.52	17.90 m	NU20R
3rd place, bronze medalist(s)	Emily Scherf	Germany	16.93	17.23	16.34	17.14	x	16.63	17.23 m	PB
4	Anita Nalesso	Italy	16.50	16.29	x	15.20	15.16	x	16.50 m	
5	Anhelina Shepel	Ukraine	15.26	16.42	15.02	15.89	x	15.70	16.42 m	PB
6	Maria Rafailidou	Greece	16.25	x	x	15.51	x	15.63	16.25 m	
7	He Yuxiao	China	15.92	15.84	x	x	x		15.92 m	SB
8	Jaslene Massey	United States	x	14.85	15.63	15.11	14.95		15.63 m	
9	Elettra Bernardis	Italy	14.99	15.14	15.19	14.71			15.19 m	
10	Maryann MacEdru	Fiji	x	15.04	15.01	14.91			15.04 m	
11	Kinga Jackowska	Poland	13.68	14.68	14.10				14.68 m	
—	Able Deborah Mills	Jamaica	x	x	x				NM	
