= 2026 Ibero-American U20 Championships in Athletics =

1st Ibero-American U20 Championships in Athletics
- Dates: 19–21 June 2026
- Host city: Lima, Peru
- Venue: VIDENA
- Level: U20
- Type: Outdoor
- Events: 43

2026 Ibero-American U20 Championships in Athletics was the inaugural edition of the competition organised by Asociación Iberoamericana de Atletismo for athletes under the age of 20. It took place between 19 and 21 June at the VIDENA in Lima, Peru.

== Medal summary ==
=== Boys ===
Event	Gold		Silver		Bronze	
100 metres (wind: +1.6 m/s)	Santiago Lazar (URU)	10.43	Michael Cruz (BRA)	10.43	Jean Castro (BRA)	10.51
200 metres (wind: +1.2 m/s)	Tomás León (CHI)	21.40	Santiago Lazar (URU)	21.57	Mariano Fiol (PER)	21.76
400 metres	Stiven Méndez (ECU)	47.00	Sergio Rojas (COL)	47.15	Yoneiber Moreno (VEN)	47.27
800 metres	Alejandro Ríos (ESP)	1:51.89	Amado Kalid Amador (MEX)	1:52.22	Alejandro Muñoz (ESP)	1:52.24
1500 metres	Pol Molins (ESP)	3:46.10	Álvaro González (ESP)	3:47.08	Edwar Márquez (PER)	3:47.56
3000 metres	Edwar Márquez (PER)	8:27.60	Pablo Ñauta (ECU)	8:28.00	Marlon Patiño (VEN)	8:28.76
5000 metres	Daniel Aguilar (GUA)	15:16.06	Robert Apaza (PER)	15:17.15	Only two competitors	
110 metres hurdles (99.1 cm) (wind: +2.8 m/s)	Odair Gonçalves (BRA)	13.29	Brahian Fretes (PAR)	13.71	José Luis Guevara (ECU)	13.76
400 metres hurdles	Samuel Mosquera (COL)	50.67	Lucas Rosa (BRA)	50.82	Wilton Souza Jr. (BRA)	51.93
3000 metres steeplechase	Marti Torregrossa (ESP)	8:54.77	Alejandro Domingo (ESP)	8:59.77	Salvador Lucero (ARG)	9:01.16
4 × 100 metres relay	Brazil; Kayo Lucas; Jean Castro; Pedro Nunes; Michael Cruz	41.13	Chile; Diego Mardones; Tomás León; Franco Stefoni; Martín Pérez	41.51	Peru; Ángel Solís; Pablo Rodríguez; Eduardo Rentería; Mariano Fiol	41.70
4 × 400 metres relay	Mexico; Juan Francisco Ibarra; Brau Fernández; Maximiliano Saucedo; Gerardo Hernández	3:12.32	Colombia; Samuel Mosquera; Juan David Arboleda; Juan Sebastián Sánchez; Sergio Rojas	3:12.82	Chile; Tomas Peñaloza; Cristobal Keim; Alonso Guzmán; Manuel Guzmán	3:15.24
5000 metres track walk	José Duvan Ccoscco (PER)	19:32.39	Emiliano Barba (MEX)	19:37.52	Derian Robalino (ECU)	20:00.22
High jump	Alejandro Muñoz (ESP)	2.14	Leandro Andria (ESP)	2.07	Juan José Vásquez (COL)	2.04
Pole vault	Marco Rodríguez (ESP)	5.21	Kauan Batista (ESP)	4.60	Juan Quemada (CHI)	4.60
Long jump	Kayo Lucas (BRA)	7.18w	Jhon Valencia (COL)	7.48	Pablo García (ESP)	7.44
Triple jump	Brendan Pérez (VEN)	16.38	Nicolás Guerra (ESP)	16.04	Nicolas da Silva (BRA)	15.80
Shot put (6 kg)	Alessandro Borges (BRA)	19.89	Ricardo Lobos (CHI)	17.52	Yeray Royuela (ESP)	17.44
Discus throw (1.75 kg)	Brandon Delgado (MEX)	59.14	Yeray Royuela (ESP)	56.80	Vittorio Gorziglia (CHI)	54.34
Hammer throw (6 kg)	Patry Váldez (ECU)	70.25	Alonso Sánchez (ESP)	68.85	Magno Llopis (ESP)	66.80
Javelin throw	Orlando Fernández (VEN)	69.85	Pietro Silva (BRA)	65.97	Adrián Viso (ARG)	65.70
Decathlon (U20)	Ariff Pérez (VEN)	7302	Manuel Vilela (ARG)	6772	Maykel Rua (ECU)	6375

=== Girls ===
Event	Gold		Silver		Bronze	
100 metres (wind: +3.2 m/s)	Hakelly de Souza (BRA)	11.39	Roxana Ramírez (CHI)	11.42	Rihana Mora (CRC)	11.59
200 metres (wind: +2.1 m/s)	Hakelly de Souza (BRA)	23.47	Roxana Ramírez (CHI)	23.56	Valeria Uriepero (VEN)	23.75
400 metres	Génesis Cañola (ECU)	53.62	Ana Alba Ruiz (ESP)	53.63	Kenya Maturana (MEX)	53.95
800 metres	Antonella Lanuza (CRC)	2:09.56	Pamela Barreto (ECU)	2:09.69	Camila de Campos (BRA)	2:10.72
1500 metres	Mara Rolli (ESP)	4:25.85	Valentina Velárdez (ARG)	4:27.11	Antonella Lanuza (CRC)	4:33.98
3000 metres	Claudia Gutiérrez (ESP)	9:33.55	Irene Pernia (ARG)	9:35.04	Kenya Cuahutle (MEX)	9:35.63
5000 metres	Fatima Hernández (ESP)	17:06.22	Sherly Jallo (PER)	17:37.10	Lesly Paucar (ECU)	17:42.19
100 metres hurdles (wind: +1.3 m/s)	Rihana Mora (CRC)	13.67	Beatriz Monteiro (BRA)	13.96	Leonor Ferreiro (CHI)	14.21
400 metres hurdles	Michel Gómez (COL)	59.35	Alaine Aguerralde (ESP)	59.56	Iraia Ventosela (ESP)	59.77
3000 m steeplechase	Debris Paniagua (ESP)	10:21.30	Monica Guijarro (ESP)	10:28.85	Nicole Herdy (BRA)	10:45.21
4 × 100 metres relay	Venezuela; Osmary Pacheco; Orihana Guzmán; Dilany Melo; Valeria Uriepero	46.33	Brazil; Karine Martins; Victoria de Almeida; Beatriz Monteiro; Hakelly de Souza	46.51	Chile; Jacinta Philipps; Roxana Ramírez; Leonor Ferreiro; Pilar Rodríguez	46.88
4 × 400 metres relay	Colombia; Isabella Hurtado; Sara Cuesta; Emily Montaño; Michel Gómez	3:43.29	Ecuador; Gloria Cañola; Pamela Barreto; Tatiana Diaz; Génesis Cañola	3:45.84	Mexico; Paula Díaz; Georgina Sosa; Luna Govea; Alisson Martínez	3:48.47
5000 m track walk	Andia Arotaipe (PER)	22:48.45	Nelci Rojas (BOL)	22:48.85	Naomi Luis (MEX)	22:54.30
High jump	Maria Clara de Oliveira (BRA)	1.74	Jeraldine Pata (ECU)	1.71	Maria Clara Belmonte (BRA)	1.68
Pole vault	Luna Pabón (COL)	4.10	Valentina Mozó (CHI)	3.40	Norma Canossa (CRC)	3.30
Long jump	Sofía Contreras (CHI)	6.22	Luna Arnas (ESP)	6.13	Orianna Díaz (VEN)	5.98
Triple jump	Naida Calonge (ESP)	13.11w	Ana Estrella de León (ESP)	13.06	Karine Martins (BRA)	13.02
Shot put	Belsy Quiñónez (ECU)	16.84	Andrea Tankeu (ESP)	15.02	Edimara Alves (BRA)	14.78
Discus throw	Isabella Mosquera (COL)	50.58	Andrea Tankeu (ESP)	50.30	Tyra Caicedo (ECU)	45.01
Hammer throw	Aixa Corbacho (ESP)	61.04	Kimberly Assiz (BRA)	58.63	Denisse Medina (ECU)	58.00
Javelin throw	Kimberly Flores (PER)	51.02 NR	Milagros Rosas (ARG)	49.93	Sara Custodio (BRA)	48.22
Heptathlon	Angelina Muga (ARG)	4997	Júlia Aere (BRA)	4736	Beatriz Aranha (BRA)	4615

=== Mixed ===
Event	Gold		Silver		Bronze	
4 × 100 metres relay	Venezuela; Michael Malpa; Orihana Guzman; Ariff Perez; Valeria Uriepero	43.73	Brazil; Kayo Lucas; Victoria de Almeida; Jean Castro; Hakelly de Souza	44.07	Chile; Martín Pérez; Jacinta Silva; Franco Stefoni; Josefa Silva	44.46
4 × 400 metres relay	Mexico; Gerardo Hernández; Alisson Martínez; Juan Francisco Ibarra; Kenya Maturana	3:24.10	Spain; Diego Espeso; Ana Alba Ruiz; Alejandro Rios; Alaine Aguerralde	3:25.05	Colombia; Samuel Mosquera; Sara Cuesta; Juan Sebastián Sánchez; Isabella Hurtado	3:25.66

=== Medal table ===
* Host nation (Peru)

Rank	Nation	Gold	Silver	Bronze	Total
1	Spain	11	14	5	30
2	Brazil	7	9	10	26
3	Colombia	5	3	2	10
4	Venezuela	5	0	4	9
5	Ecuador	4	4	6	14
6	Peru*	4	2	3	9
7	Mexico	3	2	4	9
8	Chile	2	5	6	13
9	Costa Rica	2	0	3	5
10	Argentina	1	4	2	7
11	Uruguay	1	1	0	2
12	Guatemala	1	0	0	1
13	Bolivia	0	1	0	1
13	Paraguay	0	1	0	1
Totals (14 entries)		46	46	45	137
