= 2025 Pan American U20 Athletics Championships =

XXII Pan American U20 Athletics Championships
- Dates: 3–5 October
- Host city: Bogotá, Colombia
- Venue: Estadio de Atletismo El Salitre
- Level: U20
- Events: 45

The 2025 Pan American U20 Athletics Championships was the 22nd edition of the biennial track and field competition for under-20 athletes from the Americas, organized by the Association of Panamerican Athletics. The competition was held at the Estadio de Atletismo El Salitre in Bogotá, Colombia, between 3 and 5 October 2025.

== Medal summary ==
=== Men ===
Event	Gold		Silver		Bronze	
100 metres (wind: -0.9 m/s)	Deiner Guaitoto; Colombia	10.44	Adrián Nicolari; Uruguay	10.55	Mariano Fiol; Peru	10.69
200 metres (wind: -0.7 m/s)	Deiner Guaitoto; Colombia	21.05	Mariano Fiol; Peru	21.45	Yilmer Olano; Colombia	21.60
400 metres	Ian Andrey Pata; Ecuador	46.33	Axel Gómez; Venezuela	46.43	Juan Sebastián Sánchez; Colombia	47.02
800 metres	Giancarlo Bravo; Peru	1:53.15	Freddy Rojas; Venezuela	1:53.55	Julio Chirinos; Venezuela	1:53.72
1500 metres	Dylan Carrasco; Colombia	3:57.24	Pablo Ñauta; Ecuador	3:58.30	Julio Chirinos; Venezuela	3:58.79
3000 metres	Jessiel Páez; Ecuador	8:27.54	Brayan Huanca; Peru	8:28.07	Dylan Carrasco; Colombia	8:28.08
5000 metres	Brayan Huanca; Peru	14:48.06	Jeissiel Páez; Ecuador	14:50.32	Kheny Meneses; Peru	15:03.25
110 metres hurdles (99.1 cm) (wind: +0.9 m/s)	José Luis Guevara; Ecuador	13.52	Luis Orta; Puerto Rico	13.54	Gerónimo Canizales; Colombia	13.59
400 metres hurdles	Ramón Fuenzalida; Chile	51.77	Santiago Quintero; Venezuela	51.90	Samuel Mosquera; Colombia	52.30
3000 m steeplechase	Lizardo Huamani; Peru	9:24.47	Franklin Patiño; Peru	9:31.21	Rony Guerra; Colombia	9:52.23
4 × 100 m relay	Colombia; Sebastián Palomeque; Yeison González; Yilmer Olano; Deiner Guaitoto	40.16	Ecuador; Frank Nazareno; Ian Andrey Pata; Adrian Rodríguez; José Luis Guevara	42.24	Not awarded	
4 × 400 m relay	Colombia; Camilo Redondo; José Miguel Valencia; Orlando Ríos; Juan Sebastián Sánchez	3:11.87	Venezuela; Santiago Quintero; Julio Chirinos ? Axel Gómez	3:13.82	Puerto Rico; Yariel Pérez; Yadiel Santana; Jatziel Hernández; Víctor Alvarado	3:14.31
5000 m walk	Iván Oña; Ecuador	20:42.31	José Duvan Ccoscco; Peru	21:09.65	Juan Pablo Rojas; Colombia	21:32.70
High jump	Deyvid Lara; Ecuador	2.07 m	Cristóbal Sahurie; Chile	2.03 m	Domingo Lorenzini; Chile	2.01 m
Pole vault	Ricardo Montes de Oca; Venezuela	5.20 m	Andrés Torres; Colombia	4.70 m	Agustín Roldán; Colombia	4.20 m
Long jump	Alexander Villalba; Paraguay	7.38 m	Brayan Piñeros; Colombia	7.24 m	Jhon Valencia; Colombia	7.23 m
Triple jump	Deyvid Lara; Ecuador	15.08 m	Pablo Buelvas; Colombia	14.66 m	Not awarded	
Shot put (6 kg)	Alessandro Borges; Brazil	19.74 m	Pedro Modesto; Brazil	18.72 m	Kevin Huang; Chile	16.81 m
Discus throw (1.75 kg)	Alberto Rodrigues; Brazil	58.66 m	Julián Ortiz; Colombia	53.47 m	Kevin Huang; Chile	52.50 m
Hammer throw (6 kg)	Nicolás Vergara; Chile	67.26 m	Andrés Melguiz; Colombia	64.28 m	Jhonnier Rondón; Colombia	62.46 m
Javelin throw	Thiago Santos; Brazil	71.84 m	Jheicor Valor; Venezuela	67.12 m	Miguel Mira; Colombia	60.49 m
Decathlon (U20)	Max Moraga; Chile	7012 pts	Yeider Palacios; Colombia	5996 pts	José David García; Colombia	5774 pts
WR world record | AR area record | CR championship record | GR games record | NR national record | OR Olympic record | PB personal best | SB season best | WL world leading (in a given season)

=== Women ===
Event	Gold		Silver		Bronze	
100 metres (wind: -0.9 m/s)	María Maturana; Colombia	11.39	Frances Colón; Puerto Rico	11.46	Patricia Sine; Dominican Republic	11.81
200 metres (wind: -1.9 m/s)	María Maturana; Colombia	23.36	Frances Colón; Puerto Rico	23.79	Estefania Rivera; Puerto Rico	24.36
400 metres	Isabella Hurtado; Colombia	54.18	Génesis Cañola; Ecuador	54.81	Pamela Barreto; Ecuador	55.00
800 metres	Pamela Barreto; Ecuador	2:12.17	Ángela Benítez; Puerto Rico	2:12.99	Aurora Bertelsen; Chile	2:13.63
1500 metres	Erika Torres; Colombia	4:41.35	Karol Luna; Colombia	4:42.03	Soury Flores; Peru	4:50.30
3000 metres	Karol Luna; Colombia	10:18.85	Erika Torres; Colombia	10:37.10	Danna Rizo; Colombia	11:08.42
5000 metres	Ruth Aguilar; Peru	18:33.17	Danna Rizo; Colombia	18:45.26	Magnolia Nina; Peru	19:08.41
100 metres hurdles (wind: +1.1 m/s)	Catalina Arellano; Chile	13.60	María Alejandra Castillo; Ecuador	13.72	Valeria George; Colombia	13.78
400 metres hurdles	Michel Gómez; Colombia	59.81	Amanda da Silva; Brazil	60.76	Tatiana López; Ecuador	60.80
3000 m steeplechase	Ruth Aguilar; Peru	11:13.04	Erika Torres; Colombia	11:21.04	Magnolia Nina; Peru	12:13.94
4 × 100 m relay	Puerto Rico; Legna Echevarría; Frances Colón; Darelis Domínguez; Estefania Rivera	44.58	Colombia; Angie Amhuila; Yessica Sánchez; Yesenia Sánchez; María Maturana	45.47	Dominican Republic; Heilanny Ovalles; Darianny Jiménez; Yisneidi Alcantara; Patricia Sine	46.40
4 × 400 m relay	Colombia; Laura Alcalá; Michel Gómez; Sara Cuesta; Isabella Hurtado	3:42.09	Ecuador; Camille Romero; Pamela Barreto; Kristel Méndez; Génesis Cañola	3:45.38	Puerto Rico; Valeria Colón; Ángela Benítez; Norian Velázquez; Alejandra Vélez	3:48.64
5000 m walk	Ruby Segura; Colombia	23:40.16	Estrella Rojas; Peru	23:53.63	Katherine Barreto; Ecuador	24:37.99
High jump	Maria Eduarda de Oliveira; Brazil	1.82 m	Jeraldine Pata; Ecuador	1.76 m	Emily Desiderio; Ecuador	1.70 m
Pole vault	Luna Pabón; Colombia	3.90 m	Rafaela Stinghen; Brazil	3.80 m	María Fernanda Gómez; Colombia	3.80 m
Long jump	Legna Echevarría; Puerto Rico	5.94 m	Leivis Rivas; Colombia	5.89 m	Valeska Valencia; Ecuador	5.71 m
Triple jump	Valery Arce; Colombia	12.45 m	Julianna Rodríguez; Colombia	12.16 m (w)	Keaisy Mosquera; Colombia	11.47 m
Shot put	Belsy Quiñónez; Ecuador	16.35 m	Karol Mosquera; Colombia	12.42 m	María Díaz; Colombia	11.71 m
Discus throw	Samanta Santos; Brazil	50.52 m	Ottaynis Mercedes; Venezuela	50.29 m	Valery Franco; Colombia	44.56 m
Hammer throw	Yenniver Veroes; Venezuela	64.39 m	Kimberly de Souza; Brazil	56.86 m	Saray Pérez; Colombia	50.14 m
Javelin throw	Beatriz Marafiga; Brazil	49.16 m	Sara Custodio; Brazil	48.93 m	Luisa Fernanda Ortega; Colombia	45.85 m
WR world record | AR area record | CR championship record | GR games record | NR national record | OR Olympic record | PB personal best | SB season best | WL world leading (in a given season)

=== Mixed ===
Event	Gold		Silver		Bronze	
4 × 400 m relay	Colombia; Brayan Córdoba; Sara Cuesta; Juan Sebastián Sánchez; Isabella Hurtado	3:25.96	Ecuador; David Mendoza; Pamela Barreto; Ian Andrey Pata; Kristel Méndez	3:27.57	Dominican Republic; Diosquendri Rojas; Heilanny Ovalles; Wellington Martínez; Yisneidy Alcántara	3:37.89
WR world record | AR area record | CR championship record | GR games record | NR national record | OR Olympic record | PB personal best | SB season best | WL world leading (in a given season)

== Medal table ==
* Host nation (Colombia)

Rank	Nation	Gold	Silver	Bronze	Total
1	Colombia*	16	14	20	50
2	Ecuador	8	8	5	21
3	Brazil	6	5	0	11
4	Peru	5	5	5	15
5	Chile	4	1	4	9
6	Venezuela	2	6	2	10
7	Puerto Rico	2	4	3	9
8	Paraguay	1	0	0	1
9	Uruguay	0	1	0	1
10	Dominican Republic	0	0	3	3
Totals (10 entries)		44	44	42	130
