= 2026 South American Under-23 Championships in Athletics =

XII South American Under-23 Championships in Athletics
- Dates: 16–18 October
- Host city: Santa Fe, Argentina
- Venue: Centro de Alto Rendimiento Deportivo Pedro Candioti
- Level: Under-23
- Events: 45
- Participation: 307 athletes from 13 nations
- Records set: 7 CR

The 2026 South American Under-23 Championships in Athletics was the twelfth edition of the biennial track and field competition for South American athletes aged under 23 years old, organised by Atletismo Sudamericano.

== Medal summary ==
=== Men ===
Event	Gold		Silver		Bronze	
100 metres (wind: -1.4 m/s)	Tomás Villegas (ARG)	10.42	Lucas Villegas (ARG)	10.44	Ángel Ramírez (VEN)	10.45
200 metres (wind: -0.2 m/s)	Renan Gallina (BRA)	20.57	Tomás Mondino (ARG)	20.97	Mateo Peña (COL)	21.25
400 metres	Vinícius Galeno (BRA)	46.32	Tishawn Easton (GUY)	46.85	Emerson Nascimento (BRA)	47.03
800 metres	Klaus Scholz (CHI)	1:48.50	Tomás Salvat (ARG)	1:49.30	Giancarlo Bravo (PER)	1:49.66
1500 metres	Klaus Scholz (CHI)	3:53.85	Pablo Ñauta (ECU)	3:54.39	Uriel Muñoz (ARG)	3:54.99
5000 metres	Edwar Márquez (PER)	14:08.81	Dylan Carrasco (COL)	14:08.90	Pablo Ñauta (ECU)	14:13.67
10,000 metres	Dylan Carrasco (COL)	29:59.76	Nider Pecho (PER)	30:00.22	Luis Chávez (PER)	31:09.81
110 metres hurdles (wind: -0.7 m/s)	Thiago Resende (BRA)	13.70 CR	Adrián Rodríguez (ECU)	13.96	Francisco Ferreccio (ARG)	13.96
400 metres hurdles	Samuel Mosquera (COL)	49.97 CR	Ramón Fuenzalida (CHI)	50.47	Óscar Rodríguez (VEN)	50.92
3000 metres steeplechase	Salvador Lucero (ARG)	8:49.91	Yeferson Cuno (PER)	9:00.88	Mateus dos Santos (BRA)	9:09.64
4 × 100 m relay	Argentina (ARG); Matías Castro; Tomás Mondino; Lucas Villegas; Tomás Villegas	39.67	Venezuela (VEN); Ariff Pérez; Ángel Ramírez; Keiver Pirela; Óscar Rodríguez	40.42	Colombia (COL); Camilo Redondo; Mateo Peña; Enoc Marum; Luis Hernández	40.68
4 × 400 m relay	Brazil (BRA); Victor Chaves; Emerson Nascimento; Paulo Batista; Vinícius Galeno	3:09.18	Ecuador (ECU); Ian Andrey Pata; Elías Cañola; Stiven Méndez; Dusthyn Morquecho	3:12.39	Argentina (ARG); Manuel Robles; Lucas Vaudagna; Iván Maidana; Tomás Salvat	3:12.56
Half marathon track walk	Jaime Ccanto (PER)	1:26:57.7 CR	Miguel Arcangel (COL)	1:27:03.6	Iván Oña (ECU)	1:32:09.1
High jump	Wandersson Vieira (BRA)	2.12 m	Daniel Pimenta (BRA); Cristóbal Sahurie (CHI)	2.00 m	Not awarded	
Pole vault	Pedro Aparecido (BRA)	5.00 m	Aurelio Leite (BRA)	4.90 m	Andy Espinoza (ECU)	4.70 m
Long jump	Christopher Thiessen (PAR)	7.58 m	Ángel Ramírez (VEN)	7.46 m	Martín Saavedra (ARG)	7.45 m
Triple jump	Benjamin Oliveira (BRA)	15.84 m	Luan Robert Silva (BRA)	15.51 m	Miguel Pirela (VEN)	15.45 m
Shot put	Pedro Modesto (BRA)	18.85 m	Alessandro Borges (BRA)	18.80 m	Luis Humberto Fossa (PER)	16.91 m
Discus throw	Alberto dos Santos Filho (BRA)	55.84 m	Alan Mardones (CHI)	53.27 m	Juan David Montaño (COL)	52.21 m
Hammer throw	Miguel Castro (CHI)	67.38 m	Tomás Olivera (ARG)	66.93 m	Benjamín Melo (CHI)	66.62 m
Javelin throw	Santiago Pimentel (COL)	72.98 m	Orlando Fernández (VEN)	70.76 m	Yirmar Torres (ECU)	68.52 m
Decathlon	Ariff Pérez (VEN)	7046 pts	Mayron Gomes (BRA)	6588 pts	Franco Pérez (ARG)	6016 pts

=== Women ===
Event	Gold		Silver		Bronze	
100 metres (wind: -2.2 m/s)	Glanyernis Guerra (VEN)	11.67	Milagros D'Amico (ARG)	11.77	Suellen Vitória (BRA)	11.80
200 metres (wind: -1.3 m/s)	Glanyernis Guerra (VEN)	23.87	Hilary Rivas (VEN)	23.91	Danna Banquez (COL)	24.02
400 metres	Osmary Pacheco (VEN)	53.5	Paola Loboa (COL)	54.5	Génesis Cañola (ECU)	54.5
800 metres	Sabrina Pena (BRA)	2:05.38 CR	Anita Poma (PER)	2:07.49	Luise Braga (BRA)	2:07.55
1500 metres	Anita Poma (PER)	4:19.91 CR	Valentina Velardez (ARG)	4:22.40	Luz Arias (PER)	4:34.58
5000 metres	Veronica Huacasi (PER)	16:44.50	Luz Arias (PER)	17:02.72	Valentina Velardez (ARG)	17:22.53
10,000 metres	Tamara Villegas (CHI)	35:46.76	Rocío Campanini (ARG)	36:10.48	Kauane Joaquim (BRA)	36:34.15
100 metres hurdles (wind: -1.6 m/s)	Helen Bernard (ARG)	13.49	Catalina Rozas (CHI)	13.58	Pietra Campbell (BRA)	14.02
400 metres hurdles	Camille de Oliveira (BRA)	57.66	Nykolli Alves (BRA)	59.44	Montserrath Gauto (PAR)	60.23
3000 metres steeplechase	Gabriela Tardivo (BRA)	10:28.27	Magnolia Nina (PER)	10:33.83	Antonella Bonomi (URU)	10:36.18
4 × 100 m relay	Venezuela (VEN); Hilary Rivas; Orihana Guzmán; Valeria Uriepero; Glanyernis Guerra	44.93	Brazil (BRA); Pietra Campbell; Hakelly Maximiano; Victoria Campos; Suellen Vitória	45.32	Colombia (COL); Emily Román; Paola Loboa; Danna Banquez; Marleth Ospino	45.35
4 × 400 m relay	Brazil (BRA); Nykolli Alves; Sabrina Pena; Luise Braga; Camille de Oliveira	3:42.81	Ecuador (ECU); Daniela Castro; Gloria Cañola; Pamela Barreto; Génesis Cañola	3:46.39	Argentina (ARG); Francucci Paz; Candela Basaldua; Milena Raschella; Angela Almada	3:48.37
Half marathon track walk	Rubi Segura (COL)	1:39:31.7 CR	Sasha Quispe (PER)	1:39:55.7	Yhomayra Barron (BOL)	1:50:25.6
High jump	Maria Eduarda de Oliveira (BRA)	1.80 m	Lola Verdini (ARG)	1.70 m	Antonia Paut (CHI)	1.70 m
Pole vault	Débora Sabino (BRA)	4.00 m	Carolina Scarponi (ARG)	3.90 m	Julia Calabretti (BRA)	3.90 m
Long jump	Maria Teixeira (BRA)	6.01 m	Sofía Contreras (CHI)	5.96 m	Vanessa Sena (BRA)	5.89 m
Triple jump	Karine Martins (BRA)	12.85 m	Yenifer Mendoza (VEN)	12.74 m w	Maria Teixeira (BRA)	12.74 m
Shot put	Belsy Quiñónez (ECU)	17.07 m	Taniele da Silva (BRA)	14.32 m	Agostina Pérez (ARG)	14.29 m
Discus throw	Isabella Mosquera (COL)	53.22 m	Ottaynis Febres (VEN)	50.69 m	Maria Eduarda Dantas (BRA)	50.46 m
Hammer throw	Catalina Rodríguez (COL)	65.96 m	Yenniver Veroes (VEN)	62.21 m	Agnys Eduarda (BRA)	61.08 m
Javelin throw	Manuela Rotundo (URU)	52.31 m	Kimberly Flores (PER)	51.07 m	Milagros Rosas (ARG)	49.56 m
Heptathlon	Mariangelic Rojas (VEN)	5454 pts	Angelina Muga (ARG)	5245 pts	Renata Godoy (ARG)	4956 pts

=== Mixed ===
Event	Gold		Silver		Bronze	
4 × 100 m relay	Brazil (BRA); Jean Castro; Larissa de Jesus; Wesley Dionisio; Suellen Vitória	42.83 CR	Colombia (COL); Enoc Marum; Marleth Ospino; Mateo Peña; Danna Banquez	43.36	Argentina (ARG); Tomás Villegas; Stefania Oblak; Santiago Guidetti; Julieta Telias	43.40
4 × 400 m relay	Ecuador (ECU); Dusthyn Morquecho; Pamela Barreto; Stiven Méndez; Génesis Cañola	3:24.13	Venezuela (VEN); Roineld Lara; Beynaili Romero; Axel Gómez; Osmary Pacheco	3:24.47	Brazil (BRA); Emerson Nascimento; Sabrina Pena; Renan Miguel; Júlia Ribeiro	3:24.75

== Medal table ==
* Host nation (Argentina)

Rank	Nation	Gold	Silver	Bronze	Total
1	Brazil (BRA)	18	8	12	38
2	Venezuela (VEN)	6	8	3	17
3	Colombia (COL)	6	4	5	15
4	Argentina (ARG)*	4	10	11	25
5	Peru (PER)	4	7	4	15
6	Chile (CHI)	4	5	2	11
7	Ecuador (ECU)	2	4	5	11
8	Paraguay (PAR)	1	0	1	2
8	Uruguay (URU)	1	0	1	2
10	Guyana (GUY)	0	1	0	1
11	Bolivia (BOL)	0	0	1	1
12	Suriname (SUR)	0	0	0	0
Totals (12 entries)		46	47	45	138

== Team scores ==
Rank	Country	Combined	Men	Women
1	Brazil	371	199	172
2	Argentina	242	128	114
3	Venezuela	178	81	97
4	Colombia	137	75	62
5	Chile	128	88	40
6	Peru	113	57	56
7	Ecuador	107	70	37
8	Paraguay	38	25	13
9	Uruguay	31	6	2
10	Bolivia	12	2	10
11	Guyana	9	9	0
12	Suriname	0	0	0

== Participation ==
- Argentina (74)
- Bolivia (3)
- Brazil (63)
- Chile (31)
- Colombia (21)
- Ecuador (19)
- Guatemala (1)
- Guyana (5)
- Paraguay (21)
- Peru (19)
- Suriname (1)
- Uruguay (29)
- Venezuela (20)
