= South American Under-23 Championships in Athletics =

Biennial athletics competition

The South American Under-23 Championships in Athletics (Campeonatos Sudamericanos de Atletismo de Sub-23) is an under-23 athletics competition held between the member associations of the South American Athletics Confederation (ConSudAtle). Rules and regulations are displayed on the ConSudAtle webpage. In 2006 and 2010, the championships were held as part of the athletics section of South American Games (ODESUR).

== Editions ==
	Year	City	Country	Date	Venue	No. of Events	No. of Athletes
1st	2004	Barquisimeto	Venezuela	26–27 June	Polideportivo Máximo Viloria	44	310 + 23 guest athletes
2nd	2006	Buenos Aires	Argentina	10–12 November	Centro Nacional de Alto Rendimiento Deportivo (CeNARD)	44	410
3rd	2008	Lima	Peru	6–7 September	Estadio de la Villa Deportiva Nacional (VIDENA)	44	about 260
4th	2010	Medellín	Colombia	20–23 March	Estadio Alfonso Galvis Duque at the Unidad Deportiva Atanasio Girardot	44	
5th	2012	São Paulo	Brazil	22–23 September	Estádio Ícaro de Castro Mello	44	240
6th	2014	Montevideo	Uruguay	3–5 October	Pista de Atletismo Darwin Piñeyrúa	44	310
7th	2016	Lima	Peru	23–25 September	Estadio Atlético La Videna	44	237
8th	2018	Cuenca	Ecuador	29–30 September	Pista de Atletismo Jefferson Pérez	44	233
9th	2021	Guayaquil	Ecuador	16–17 October	Estadio Alberto Spencer	45	272
10th	2022	Cascavel	Brazil	30 September – 2 October	Estádio do Centro Nacional de Treinamento de Atletismo	45	259
11th	2024	Bucaramanga	Colombia	27–29 September	Estadio de Atletismo La Flora	45	252
12th	2026	Santa Fe	Argentina	14–16 August	Centro de Alto Rendimiento Deportivo Pedro Candioti	45	

== Medal table (2004–2024) ==
Rank	Nation	Gold	Silver	Bronze	Total
1	Brazil (BRA)	203	174	132	509
2	Colombia (COL)	81	87	59	227
3	Argentina (ARG)	42	33	54	129
4	Ecuador (ECU)	40	37	53	130
5	Chile (CHI)	34	45	68	147
6	Venezuela (VEN)	31	44	34	109
7	Peru (PER)	30	38	42	110
8	Uruguay (URU)	13	7	9	29
9	Paraguay (PAR)	5	11	10	26
10	Bolivia (BOL)	5	8	14	27
11	Panama (PAN)	2	1	4	7
12	Guyana (GUY)	1	2	2	5
Totals (12 entries)		487	487	481	1,455

== Records ==
=== Men ===
Event	Record	Athlete	Nationality	Date	Edition	Place	Ref.
100 m	10.08 (+0.5 m/s)	Erik Cardoso	Brazil	29 September 2022	2022 Championships	Cascavel, Brazil	
200 m	20.15 (+1.1 m/s)	Renan Gallina	Brazil	1 October 2022	2022 Championships	Cascavel, Brazil	
400 m	45.19 A	Anthony Zambrano	Colombia	29 September 2018	2018 Championships	Cuenca, Ecuador	
800 m	1:47.20	Rafith Rodríguez	Colombia	21 March 2010	2010 Championships	Medellín, Colombia	
1500 m	3:43.55	Leonardo de Jesus	Brazil	27 September 2024	2024 Championships	Bucaramanga, Colombia	
5000 m	13:57.58	Matias Silva	Chile	3 October 2014	2014 Championships	Montevideo, Uruguay	
10,000 m	29:52.06	Sérgio Celestino da Silva	Brazil	12 November 2006	2006 Championships	Buenos Aires, Argentina	
110 m hurdles	13.70 (−0.7 m/s)	Thiago Ornelas	Brazil	18 October 2026	2026 Championships	Santa Fe, Argentina	
400 m hurdles	49.97	Samuel Mosquera	Colombia	17 October 2026	2026 Championships	Santa Fe, Argentina	
3000 m steeplechase	8:49.67	Mario Bazán	Peru	12 November 2006	2006 Championships	Buenos Aires, Argentina	
High jump	2.24 m	Fernando Carvalho Ferreira	Brazil	5 October 2014	2014 Championships	Montevideo, Uruguay	
Pole vault	5.65 m	Germán Chiaraviglio	Argentina	12 November 2006	2006 Championships	Buenos Aires, Argentina	
Long jump	8.09 m (+1.8 m/s)	Jorge McFarlane	Peru	21 March 2010	2010 Championships	Medellín, Colombia	
Triple jump	16.68 m (+1.8 m/s)	Hugo Chila	Ecuador	6 September 2008	2008 Championships	Lima, Peru	
Shot put	19.93 m	Darlan Romani	Brazil	23 September 2012	2012 Championships	São Paulo, Brazil	
Discus throw	60.87 m	Lucas Nervi	Chile	17 October 2021	2021 Championships	Guayaquil, Ecuador	
Hammer throw	76.87 m A AR-U23, NR	Humberto Mansilla	Chile	29 September 2018	2018 Championships	Cuenca, Ecuador	
Javelin throw	78.92 m	Luiz Maurício da Silva	Brazil	1 October 2022	2022 Championships	Cascavel, Brazil	
Decathlon	7435 pts	Danilo Xavier	Brazil	6–7 September 2008	2008 Championships	Lima, Peru	
Decathlon	100m (wind) / Long jump (wind) / Shot put / High jump / 400m / 110m H (wind) / Discus / Pole vault / Javelin / 1500m; 11.36 (+1.8 m/s) / 7.22 m (+0.2 m/s) / 12.56 m / 1.93 m / 50.26 / 15.09 (±0.0 m/s) / 39.82 m / 4.40 m / 58.84 m / 4:44.42						
20,000 m walk (track)	1:23:22.7	Manuel Esteban Soto	Colombia	4 October 2014	2014 Championships	Montevideo, Uruguay	
20 km walk (road)	1:29:53	Paulo Henrique Ribeiro	Brazil	29 September 2022	2022 Championships	Cascavel, Brazil	
Half marathon walk (track)	1:26:57.7 h	Jaime Ccanto	Peru	18 October 2026	2026 Championships	Santa Fe, Argentina	
4 × 100 m relay	39.42	Eliezer de Almeida; Paulo Roberto; Basílio de Morães; Bruno Pacheco	Brazil	26 June 2004	2004 Championships	Barquisimeto, Venezuela	
4 × 400 m relay	3:04.39 NR	Pedro Emmert; Bruno de Genaro; Matias Falchetti; Elián Larregina	Argentina	1 October 2022	2022 Championships	Cascavel, Brazil	

Key:
^{AR-U23} South American U-23 record	^{NR} National record	^{A} affected by altitude

=== Women ===
Event	Record	Athlete	Nationality	Date	Edition	Place	Ref.
100 m	11.09 A (+1.0 m/s)	Ángela Tenorio	Ecuador	29 March 2019	2018 Championships	Cuenca, Ecuador	
200 m	22.81 A (−0.1 m/s)	Anahí Suárez	Ecuador	29 September 2022	2022 Championships	Cascavel, Brazil	
400 m	52.53	Déborah Rodríguez	Uruguay	3 October 2014	2014 Championships	Montevideo, Uruguay	
800 m	2:05.38	Sabrina Pena	Brazil	18 October 2026	2026 Championships	Santa Fe, Argentina	
1500 m	4:19.91	Anita Poma	Peru	16 October 2026	2026 Championships	Santa Fe, Argentina	
5000 m	16:30.61	Benita Parra	Bolivia	29 September 2024	2024 Championships	Bucaramanga, Colombia	
10,000 m	34:28.33	Sofia Isabel Mamani	Peru	29 September 2022	2022 Championships	Cascavel, Brazil	
100 m hurdles	13.31 A (−1.4 m/s)	Micaela de Mello	Brazil	29 September 2018	2018 Championships	Cuenca, Ecuador	
400 m hurdles	56.25 A	Fiorella Chiappe	Argentina	30 September 2018	2018 Championships	Cuenca, Ecuador	
3000 m steeplechase	10:05.30	Belén Casetta	Argentina	24 September 2016	2016 Championships	Lima, Peru	
High jump	1.91 m	Caterine Ibargüen	Colombia	27 June 2004	2004 Championships	Barquisimeto, Venezuela	
Pole vault	4.40 m A	Juliana Campos	Brazil	29 September 2018	2018 Championships	Cuenca, Ecuador	
Long jump	6.42 m A (+1.6 m/s)	Aries Sánchez	Venezuela	30 September 2018	2018 Championships	Cuenca, Ecuador	
Triple jump	13.62 m (+0.3 m/s)	Keila Costa	Brazil	26 June 2004	2004 Championships	Barquisimeto, Venezuela	
Shot put	18.43 m	Geisa Arcanjo	Brazil	23 September 2012	2012 Championships	São Paulo, Brazil	
Discus throw	58.70 m	Izabela da Silva	Brazil	3 October 2014	2014 Championships	Montevideo, Uruguay	
Hammer throw	66.48 m	Jennifer Dahlgren	Argentina	10 November 2006	2006 Championships	Buenos Aires, Argentina	
Javelin throw	58.83 m	Juleisy Angulo	Ecuador	1 October 2022	2022 Championships	Cascavel, Brazil	
Heptathlon	5899 pts	Vanessa Spínola	Brazil	22–23 September 2012	2012 Championships	São Paulo, Brazil	
Heptathlon	100m H (wind) / High jump / Shot put / 200m (wind) / Long jump (wind) / Javelin / 800m; 14.34 (−0.6 m/s) / 1.75 m / 13.52 m / 24.76 (−0.3 m/s) / 5.98 m (+0.8 m/s) / 42.42 m / 2:20.00						
20,000 m walk (track)	1:32:01.67	Glenda Morejón	Ecuador	17 October 2021	2021 Championships	Guayaquil, Ecuador	
20 km walk (road)	1:34:52	Paula Milena Torres	Ecuador	29 September 2022	2022 Championships	Cascavel, Brazil	
Half marathon walk (track)	1:39:31.7 h	Rubi Segura	Colombia	18 October 2026	2026 Championships	Santa Fe, Argentina	
4 × 100 m relay	44.18 A	Katherine Chillambo; Ángela Tenorio; Marina Poroso; Gabriela Suárez	Ecuador	30 September 2018	2018 Championships	Cuenca, Ecuador	
4 × 400 m relay	3:35.50 A	Lina Licona; Johana Arrieta; Damaris Palomeque; Eliana Chávez	Colombia	29 September 2018	2018 Championships	Cuenca, Ecuador	

=== Mixed ===
Event	Record	Athlete	Nationality	Date	Edition	Place	Ref.
4 × 100 m relay	42.83	Jean Castro; Larissa de Jesus; Wesley Dionisio; Suellen Vitória	Brazil	17 October 2026	2026 Championships	Santa Fe, Argentina	
4 × 400 m relay	3:19.88	Raúl Palacios; Paola Loboa; Daniel Balanta; Nahomy Castro	Colombia	27 September 2024	2024 Championships	Bucaramanga, Colombia	

Key:
^{AR-U23} South American U-23 record	^{NR} National record	^{A} affected by altitude
