= Jessica Oji =

Nigerian-American athlete (born 2007)

Personal information
- Nationality: Nigeria
- Citizenship: Nigerian
- Born: 23 June 2007 (age 19) US
- Education: University of Pennsylvania
- Occupations: Shotput; Discus throw
Medal record
Women's athletics
Representing Nigeria
Commonwealth Games
Silver medal – second place	2026 Glasgow	Shot put
World U20 Championships
Gold medal – first place	2026 Eugene	Shotput

Jessica Oji (born 23 June 2007) is a Nigerian-American women's shot put and discus throw athlete. In February 2026, World Athletics confirmed that she had switched her allegiance to Nigeria.

Oji first broke the Ivy League record in December 2025 with a mark of 17.72 m (58 ft 1.75 in), before going on to break it four more times at the Penn Elite Meet in a mark of 18.45m (60' 6.5"). She currently has a personal best of 18.50 m, which she used to clinch the conference title.

== Early life and education ==
Oji was born in Accra, Ghana and raised in the United States. She is currently a freshman at the University of Pennsylvania.

== Career ==
She made her debut for Nigeria in 2026 and broke the long-standing African record of 18.43 m set by former Nigerian thrower Vivian Chukwuemeka in 2003. The record placed her second in the NCAA rankings and also above Mine de Klerk African mark of 18.48m set just a day earlier. In the current world rankings, Oji is ranked No. 30 in women's shot put. Officially, the mark did not count as an African or Nigerian record, as it was achieved before her transfer of allegiance. Oji also holds the national under-20 record in the discus throw, setting a mark of 55.12 m in May 2026.

In 2025, Oji was crowned the USA U-20 Champion and placed sixth in the NCAA Division I Indoor Track and Field Championships in the shot put. Representing Nigeria at the 2026 Commonwealth Games in Glasgow, she won a silver medal on her debut, becoming the first Nigerian woman to win a medal in the event since Vivian Chukwuemeka at the 2006 Commonwealth Games in Melbourne. At the 2026 World U20 Championships in Eugene, Oregon, she claimed gold, ending Nigeria's 24-year wait for a medal in a women's field event.
