= Sport in Lima =

Sport in Lima is well supported by venues and clubs. The city of Lima has varied sports venues for association football, volleyball and basketball, many of which are located within private clubs. A popular sport among Limeans is fronton, a racquet sport similar to squash invented in Lima. The city is home to seven international-class golf courses. Equestrian is popular in Lima for which there are private clubs as well as horse racing which is centered on the Hipódromo de Monterrico. The most popular sport in Lima by far is association football with many club teams being located in the city.

Lima is the host for the following sports events:

- 2020 U-18 Women's Softball World Cup
- 2019 Pan American Games

== Sport clubs ==
| Club | Sport | League | Venue |
|---|---|---|---|
| Peruvian Institute of Sport | Various | Various | Estadio Nacional |
| Alianza Lima | Football | Primera División Peruana | Alejandro Villanueva Stadium |
| Universitario | Football | Primera División Peruana | Monumental "U" Stadium |
| Sporting Cristal | Football | Primera División Peruana | San Martín de Porres Stadium |
| Deportivo Municipal | Football | Primera División Peruana | Iván Elías Moreno Stadium |
| Regatas Lima | Various | Various | Regatas Headquarters Chorrillos |
| Real Club Lima | Basketball, Volleyball | Various | San Isidro |

== Sport venues ==
There are many sport venues in Lima including:

=== Football ===
- Monumental "U" Stadium
- National Stadium
- Universidad San Marcos Stadium
- Alejandro Villanueva Stadium
- San Martín de Porres Stadium
- Chorrillos Municipal Stadium

=== Other sports ===
- Hipódromo de Monterrico (Horse racing)
- Coliseo Eduardo Dibos Colliseum (Basketball and Volleyball)
- Amauta Coliseum (Basketball and Volleyball)
- Campo de Marte swimming pool (Swimming)
- Terrazas de Miraflores Tennis Club (Tennis)
- Lima Cricket and Football Club (Cricket, Rugby, and Association football)
- Athletics stadium (Track)
- Coliseo Polideportivo (Volleyball)

Other sports practiced in the city include surfing, equestrianism, karate, rugby, yachting, paragliding, badminton, squash, table football, mountain biking, bicycle racing, shooting, triathlon, futsal, table tennis, and track.
