= Villa Deportiva Nacional =

Major sports venue in Lima, Peru

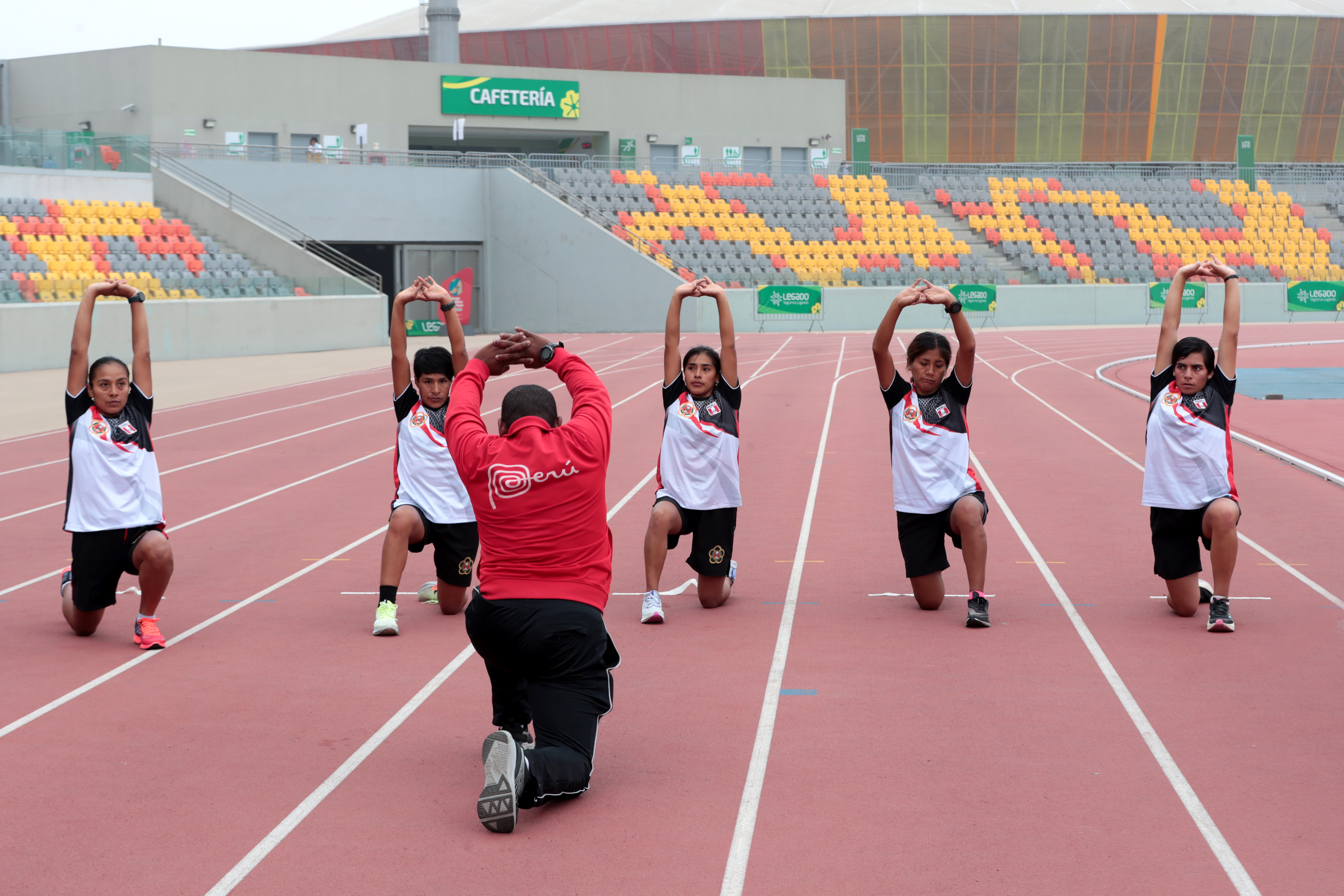
- The Peru Olympic Track Team training at the Estadio Atlético de la VIDENA
- Interactive map of Villa Deportiva Nacional
- Address: Lima, Peru
- Coordinates: 12°04′55″S 76°59′59″W

Construction
- Opened: 1993

The Villa Deportiva Nacional (National Sports Village) is, together with the Estadio Nacional del Perú (National Stadium of Peru), one of the main sports venues in Peru. It is in the District of San Luis, in the city of Lima. It is also called VIDENA, for the first two letters of each word in its name.

The offices of the football, athletics, cycling, gymnastics, softball, baseball and wrestling federations. The training centers of the Peruvian national soccer, athletics and baseball are also based here. The Peruvian Olympic Committee has its main offices on this site.

== History ==
In 1993, under the presidency of Alberto Fujimori, the Villa Deportiva Nacional was built on a total area of 21.5 hectares, its property titles are in the name of the Peruvian State, which in turn refers them to the Peruvian Sports Institute for its proper use.

Between 2009 and 2010, FPB (baseball), FPS (softball) and part of the Olympic village were rented for the construction of the electric train foundations. In 2009, the remodeling was planned to bid to host the 2015 Pan American Games. In 2010 the construction of a coliseum was announced. In 2014, the construction of the Lima High Performance Center began, along with others, all in preparation for the 2019 Pan American Games, which was hosted in Lima. The Villa Deportiva Nacional is most likely to be used in the upcoming 2027 Pan American Games which will be held in Lima once again.

== Structure ==
The VIDENA has multiple venues and buildings within its area. The Football Sports Complex is managed by the Peruvian Football Federation. Currently, it has, among other facilities, 3 courts of regulation measures, 1 coliseum for the practice of futsal, 32 rooms (all with bathroom and necessary accessories), 1 suite, 1 gym, 1 auditorium, 6 changing rooms, sauna, jacuzzi, press room and the offices of the FPF, here the training of the Peruvian National Football Team is held. In 2024, the Football Sports Complex will be completely remodeled, part of the Plan Maestro of the VIDENA. The new complex will contain, a residence/hotel for national teams with 48 rooms, being able to house up to 96 people, a new modernized gym and medical center, a new corporate building for the FPF, along with remodeling of various current buildings, the field N° 03, entrances and parking spaces and new electricity and water networks. Construction began on 26 April 2024 and is expected to last 10 months.

The VIDENA has its own stadium known as Estadio Atlético de la Villa Deportiva Nacional. It is home to all national sports teams and federations of Peru and has a capacity of 6,000. It was remodeled in preparation of the 2019 Pan American Games. It has the Class I Certification from the International Athletics Federation (IAAF) which was ready to be used in the South American Athletics Championships, remaining in the category to lead international events.

The High Performance Volleyball Center is a center for the continuous practice of volleyball, with four courts of regulation measurements, fully roofed and with efficient lighting and a synthetic material floor in a covered area of 3,956 square meters. It will also have a changing room area and technical lecture rooms.

The High Performance Center of the National Sports Village (Centro de Alto Rendimiento de La VIDENA) consists of two sports centers and a residence with the capacity to house 252 athletes. It was inaugurated on 15 December 2014. Sports Center 1 has an area of 9,500 square metres and hosts the disciplines of basketball, handball and gymnastics; and Sports Center 2, which has 11,500 square meters and develops sports such as karate, badminton, shooting, fencing, table tennis, bowling, weightlifting, wrestling and judo. The latter has a medical area and a gym.

The Velodrome of the National Sports Village is a modern velodrome and is the venue for the Track Cycling competitions at the Pan American Games and Para-track cycling at the Parapan American Games. This stage complies with international standards and is one of the most modern on the continent.

National Sports Village Aquatic Center is an aquatic sports facility, swimming competitions, artistic swimming, diving and para-swimming are held during the Pan American Games and the Parapan American Games.The venue is certified by the International Swimming Federation (FINA).

The Bowling Center of the National Sports Village is a sports facility for bowling. It has a modern stage and features 24 state-of-the-art tracks. On 13 April 2019, at a ceremony attended by Carlos Neuhaus, executive director of Lima 2019 and other important sports authorities; The Bowling Center was delivered to the Peruvian Bowling Federation in the run-up to the Lima 2019 Pan American Games.

== See also ==
- 2019 Pan American Games Athletes' Village
