= COVID-19 hospital (disambiguation) =

A COVID-19 hospital is a hospital specifically designed to handle COVID-19 cases. It may also refer to:

- COVID-19 hospitals in the United Kingdom
- Fangcang hospital
- Hospital ships designated for the COVID-19 pandemic

== See also ==
- Impact of the COVID-19 pandemic on hospitals
- Category:Hospitals established for the COVID-19 pandemic
