= 2019 Pan American Games Athletes' Village =

Building complex in Peru

Pan American Village
- Villa Panamericana
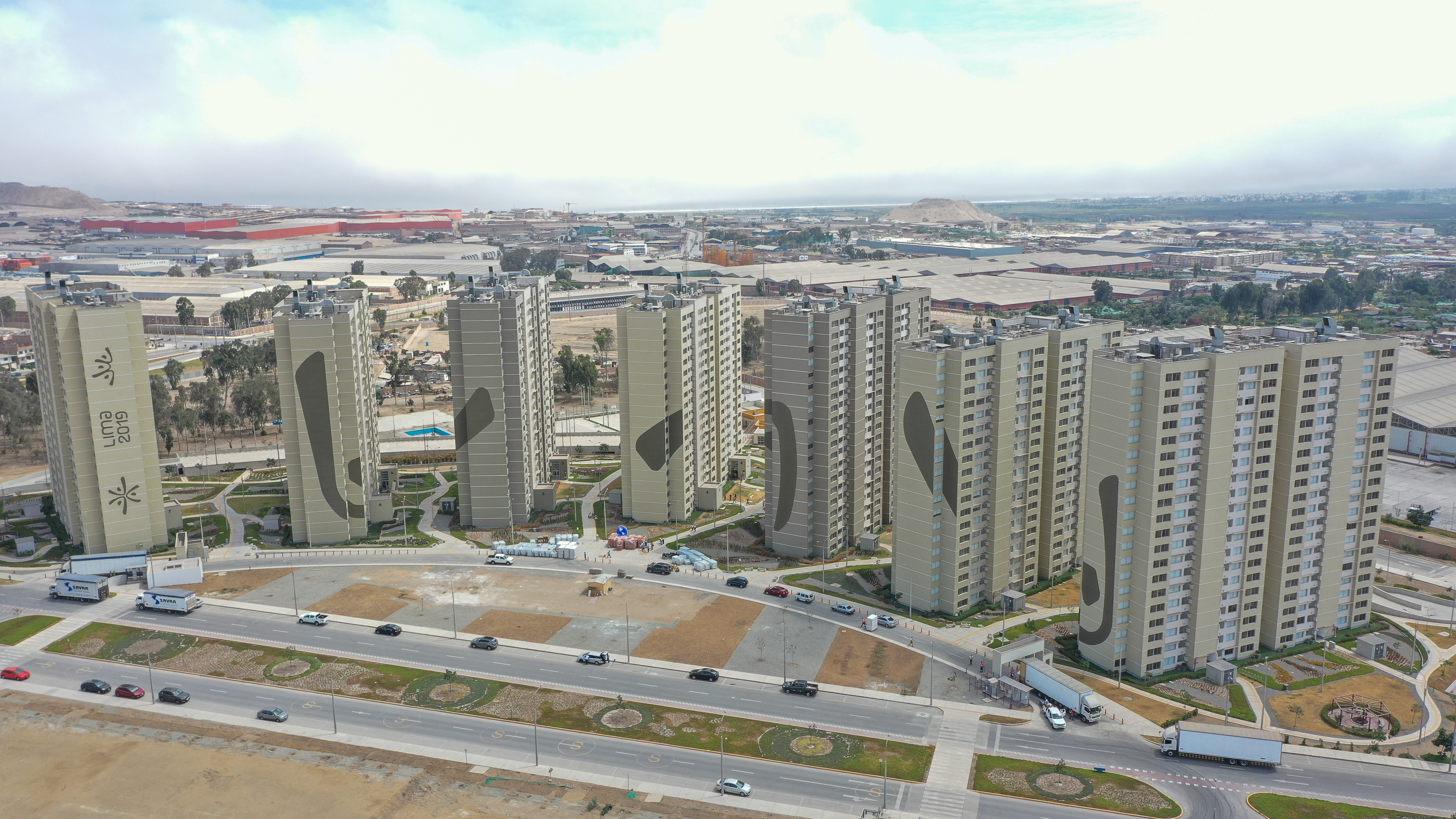
- The village in 2020
- Interactive map of the Pan American Village area
- Former names: Parque Zonal № 26 Complejo Biotecnológico

General information
- Status: Completed
- Type: Athletic residences COVID-19 hospital (2020–2022)
- Location: Villa El Salvador, Peru
- Year built: 2017–2019
- Renovated: March 19–30, 2020
- Cost: US$ 180 million
- Renovation cost: US$ 8.5 million
- Owner: Peruvian Sports Institute

Technical details
- Floor count: 19 (4 towers); 20 (3 towers)
- Grounds: 33,500 m^{2} (361,000 sq ft)

Design and construction
- Main contractor: Besco-Besalco; Peruvian Army

The Pan American and Parapan American Athletes' Village (Spanish: Villa Panamericana y Para panamericana de Atletas), also known from 2020 to 2022 as the EsSalud Pan American Village (Spanish: Villa EsSalud Panamericana), is an accommodation centre built to house the participating athletes of the 2019 Pan American and Parapan American Games located in Villa El Salvador, Lima, Peru.

The complex's construction, which took place from 2017 to 2019, was overseen by the games' organising committee (COPAL). The COVID-19 pandemic in Peru saw the complex turned into the country's largest hospital in 2020, operated by EsSalud as a temporary COVID-19 health centre. It ceased to function as such on October 18, 2022. The complex is operated by the Peruvian Sports Institute and features seven buildings with a total of 1,096 flats and a capacity for 10,000 people, as well as facilities for impaired athletes.

== History ==
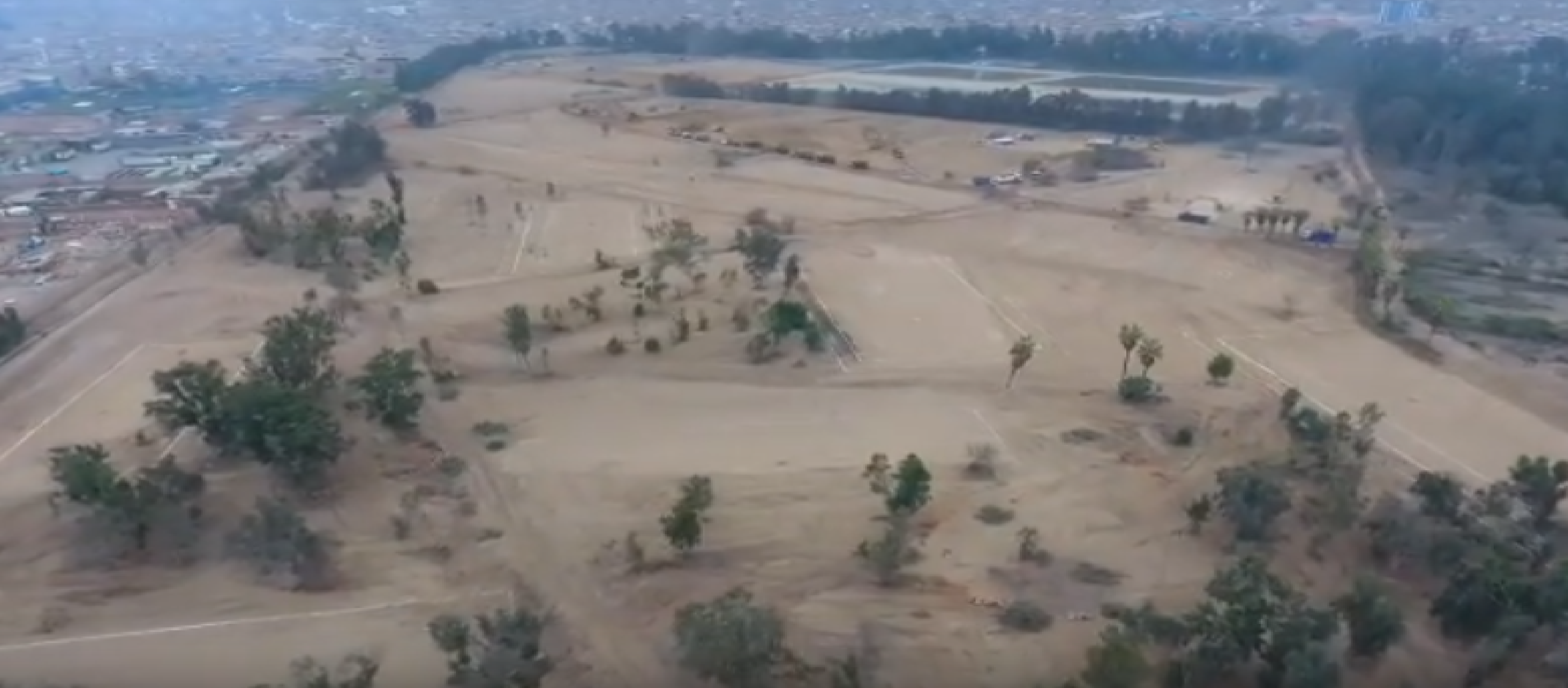
The original site in 2017.

The area, located in Lima's Villa El Salvador district, was originally a designated "Zonal Park" (Parque Zonal) formally known as the Parque Zonal № 26 Complejo Biotecnológico, located at plot PZ-26. Following the city's successful bid to host the 2019 Pan American Games, the designation was changed by the Metropolitan Municipality of Lima to a Medium-Density Residential and Public Recreation Zone to allow the construction of an athletes' village, the 44-hectare plot was transferred to the Ministry of Education, and a budget of US$ 180 million was allocated to the complex.

Prior to the area's selection, other candidate locations included Callao, Hoyos Rubio barracks (Rímac), Círculo Militar (Jesús María), La Herradura (Chorrillos), Víctor Larco Herrera Hospital (Magdalena), Leoncio Prado Military Academy (La Perla), the Costa Verde, and Campo Mar (Lurín).

Construction began in September 2017, in charge of Besco-Besalco and assisted by the Peruvian Army, with the 7-building complex being inaugurated on March 16, 2019. On July 19, Law No. 30,949 was passed, through which all athletes awarded during the Games would be granted a flat, varying in size according to the type of medal. The project's organisers intended to sell its flats to the general public following the event.

=== Use as a hospital ===
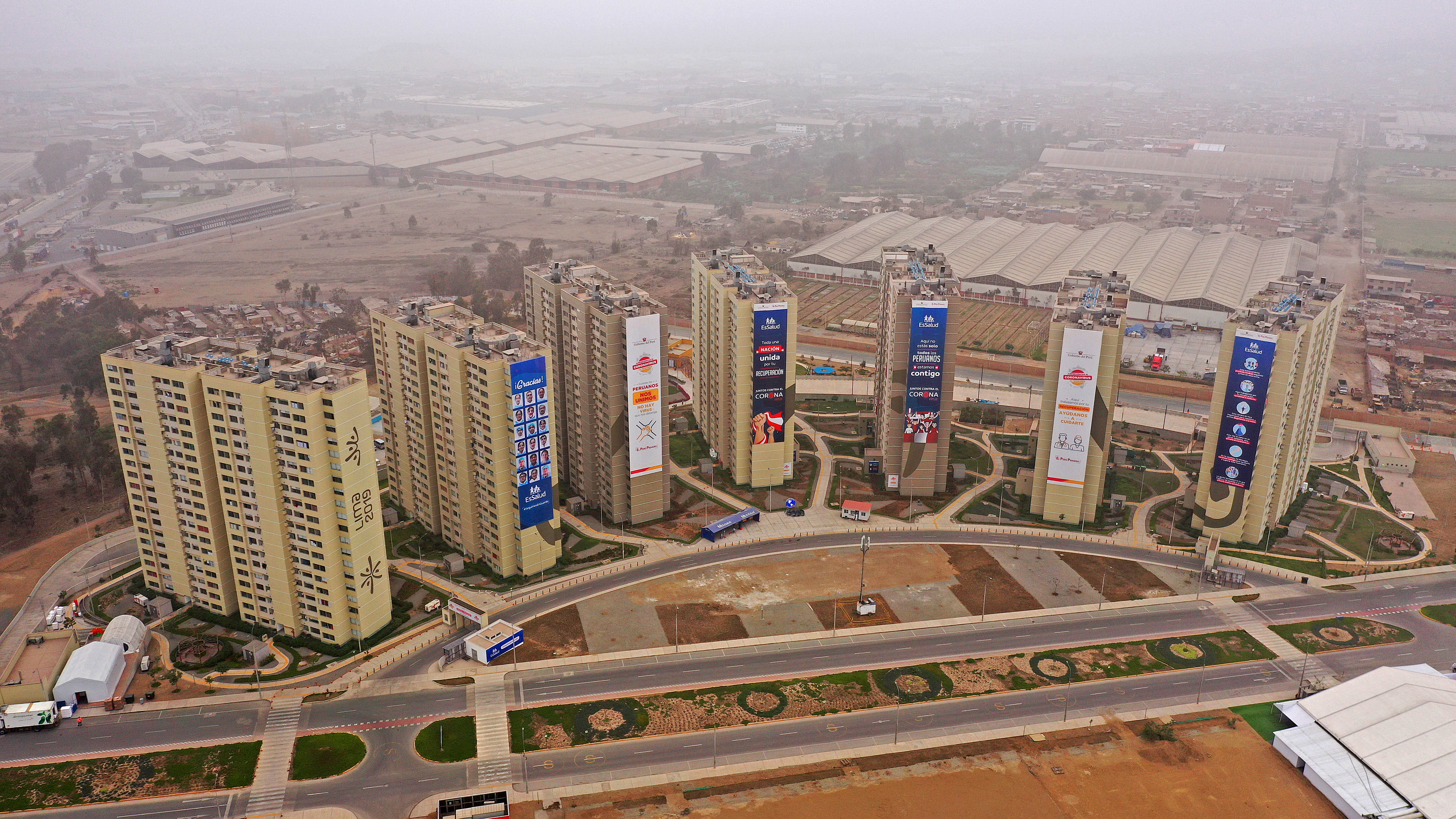
The complex in 2020.

The then ongoing COVID-19 pandemic saw the refurbishing of the complex as a temporary COVID-19 health centre operated by EsSalud through an emergency decree issued by the government in 2020. It would serve as one of two locations for infected patients, with a hospital in Ate District serving as the destination for more severe cases.

The project was executed by the complex's administrative entity and two government ministries (Environment and Defence). Renovation works began on March 19, 2020, and concluded with the new centre's inauguration on the 30th. A dozen trucks were used to transport 100 tons of materials, including 900 beds. The complex saw towers No. 1–4 and 6 destined to patient care, while tower No. 7 would be used by the medical staff. The flats awarded to 65 athletes were to be delivered following the hospital's disestablishment.

Two more buildings were repurposed in April for the use of infected police officers, and equipment for an observation room was donated to the hospital by the United States Agency for International Development in June. On July 15, WhatsApp hotlines for people to request admission were implemented, and new observation room began operating in August. Then-president Martín Vizcarra suggested that the complex be turned into a permanent medical establishment, while EsSalud president Fiorella Molinelli hoped that, given its facilities for disabled people, it could be repurposed as a geriatric centre. Each building was segmented: the first ten storeys were used for severe cases, while the rest of the floors housed patients without motility issues.

Most patients were male, 40 to 75 years old, and from Lima, Callao, and the rest of the department of Lima. The rest were from Arequipa, Ayacucho, Amazonas, Cajamarca, Cuzco, Huancavelica, La Libertad, Loreto and Ucayali. By May 2020, 3,383 people had been taken to the hospital, with 70 daily discharges by that point. By June, 6,000 patients had been admitted, and 5,000 discharged. Some patients had a hard time adapting to the repurposed buildings, after which 20 psychologists were hired to work at the complex. Controversy arose in August 2020 when an unauthorised soccer game was filmed during the then ongoing state of emergency and some players were alleged to have been medical staff, which was officially denied by EsSalud.

It ceased its functions following its final discharge on October 18, 2022.

=== Later history ===
Following the hospital's closure, the Peruvian government planned to operate the buildings as residential units. As of 2026, the complex is operated by the Peruvian Sports Institute (IPD) and its flats have been gradually delivered to athletes awarded during the 2019 Games. A dog shelter was disestablished that same year.

The IPD plans to use the complex again for the 2027 Pan American Games.

== See also ==
- Venues of the 2019 Pan American and Parapan American Games
- COVID-19 pandemic in Peru
- List of hospitals in Peru
