= Coliseo Polideportivo =

Indoor arena in Lima, Peru

Coordinates: 12.0666°S 77.0803°W

- Interactive map of Coliseo Polideportivo
- Location: Lima, Peru
- Owner: City of Lima

Coliseo Polideportivo is an indoor arena located in Lima, Peru, that is under construction. It was scheduled to be completed in July 2011, and have a seating capacity of 11,320 spectators. It will host some matches for the 2011 FIVB Women's Junior World Championship. but this work was never carried out, in its place it was built the National Sports Village: VIDENA in 2019.
