= Michel Azcueta =

Spanish-Peruvian teacher and politician

Michel Azcueta (born 1947) is a Spanish-Peruvian teacher and politician. He was born in Madrid. Affiliated with the United Left party, he was mayor of Villa El Salvador District from 1984 to 1986, 1987–1990 and 1996–1998.

Preceded by	Mayor of Villa El Salvador; 1984 – 1990	Succeeded by José Rodríguez
