= Peruvian Sports Institute =

Government institute of Peru

- Instituto Peruano del Deporte

Institute overview
- Formed: June 12, 1981; 44 years ago (Current form)
- Jurisdiction: Peru
- Headquarters: C. Madre de Dios, cdra. 3; 12°04′02.2″S 77°02′01.4″W
- Institute executive: Federico Tong Hurtado, President
- Parent Ministry: Ministry of Education
- Website: www.gob.pe/ipd

The Peruvian Sports Institute (Note: Alternatively the Peruvian Institute of Sport) (Spanish: Instituto Peruano del Deporte; IPD), known as the National Institute of Recreation, Physical Education and Sports (Spanish: Instituto Nacional de Recreación, Educación Física y Deportes; INRED) until 1981, is a Peruvian government agency that oversees all sports activities in the country. It functions as a decentralised public body assigned to the Ministry of Education. It is composed of federated bodies for each sport in the country and of regional directorates, functioning as the organiser for all recognised disciplines in the country.

== History ==
The organisation of Peruvian sport officially dates back to April 28, 1920, when then President Augusto B. Leguía officially recognised the Peruvian Athletics Sport Federation (Federación Atlética Deportiva del Perú; FADP), entrusting the execution and organisation of the plans to Alfredo Benavides Diez-Canseco as the FADP's president. On September 8, 1921, the Law for the "Structuring of National Sport" was enacted, establishing regulations consistent with the goals proposed by the FADP. In 1938, President Óscar R. Benavides promulgated Law No. 6741, creating the National Sports Committee (Spanish: Comité Nacional de Deportes), which marked a significant leap forward in the modernisation of competitive sports.

On September 16, 1969, General Juan Velasco Alvarado, through Law No. 17817, promulgated the "Organic Law of National Sport" and five years later, on March 12, 1974, through Decree Law No. 20555, the National Institute of Recreation, Physical Education and Sports (Spanish: Instituto Nacional de Recreación, Educación Física y Deportes; INRED) was created, outlining a new structure of national sports activity, promoting the principled participation of the national population, which was clear at the time.

On June 12, 1981, Legislative Decree No. 135 was issued, changing the name of INRED to the Peruvian Sports Institute (IPD). The decree was signed President Fernando Belaúnde Terry. In 1982, the Experimental Sports Education Center was founded to develop high-performance athletes. In 1985, President Belaúnde Terry enacted Legislative Decree No. 328, which led to the new General Sports Law.

Subsequently, President Alan García Pérez, with Supreme Decree No. 070-86-ED, approved the regulations for this law. Currently, Peruvian sports are governed by Law No. 28036, the Law for the Promotion and Development of Sports, enacted on July 24, 2003, by President Alejandro Toledo Manrique. Through this law, the Peruvian Sports Institute (IPD) was established as a decentralised public agency attached to the Ministry of Education (MINEDU).

In 2019, the Special Legacy Project was created to ensure the maintenance of the country's main sports infrastructure after the conclusion of that year's Pan American Games. 140 million soles were allocated annually to the five main venues, which included a total of 28 sub-venues and 88 sports fields, all managed autonomously. The project remained in operation until 2025, when the Peruvian government declared its dissolution and all the infrastructure was transferred back to the original entity, amidst a corruption case.

That same year, the IPD took charge of remodeling the infrastructure for the 2025 Bolivarian Games, although it received strong criticism from the participants. The IPD president, elected in the month of the Games' opening ceremony, denounced that his predecessor had requested, by decree, the transfer of a multi-million dollar budget to the Bolivarian Sports Organization (ODEBO), but was unsuccessful. Carlos Zegarra Presser and Carlos Neuhaus Tudela, who were part of the Legacy Special Project, indicated that the IPD had declared a state of emergency to avoid damaging its image during those Games.

=== Copa IPD ===
On January 10, 2010, the IPD held the Copa IPD (or Copa Rey de Reyes) at the Coliseo Eduardo Dibós, located in San Borja District. It saw the participation of Emilio Córdova, Julio Granda, and siblings Deysi and Jorge Cori. Córdova was declared the winner after defeating Deysi Cori.

=== Athlete Support Program ===
Since 2014, the IPD has operated the Athlete Support Program (Spanish: Programa de Apoyo al Deportista; PAD), a fund designed to support qualified athletes (those with standard or high-level qualifications). In 2019, it had a budget of S/. 11.2 million.

The program allocates financial support based on the athlete's performance. However, given the lack of a national policy to promote athletes, the absence of adequate funding to cover the costs of participating in a World Championship or the Olympic Games has been criticized. In fact, some individuals have reported that the government stopped supporting them, particularly those in sports other than men's soccer and women's volleyball. In a 2019 message, former athlete Natalia Málaga reported that 190 athletes had stopped receiving funding from the program, many of whom had participated in the 2019 Pan American Games in Lima. In 2022, the newspaper La República reported that 90 athletes had been excluded from the program.

In 2024, the head of the IPD, Federico Tong, indicated that the PAD would be restructured and that it would have the New Sports Talents Program to help athletes with professional potential.

== Organisation ==
The IPD is composed of federated bodies for each sport in the country and of regional directorates. It is headed by a president.

=== List of presidents ===
Name	Period
Presidents of the Peruvian Athletics Sport Federation
Alfredo Benavides Diez-Canseco	1920
Presidents of the National Sports Committee (1938–1968)
Eduardo Dibós Dammert	1938–1941
Miguel Dasso Hoke	1941–1946
Alejandro Carrillo Rocha	1946–1948
Leopoldo Molinari Balbuena	1949–1952
Juan Sedo Gonzales Del Valle	1952
Alfredo Hohagen Diez Canseco	1952–1955
Eduardo Astengo Campodónico	1955
Luis Marrou Correa	1956–1962
Alfredo Hohagen Diez Canseco	1963–1964
Guillermo Griffiths Escardo	1965
Victor Nagaro Bianchi	1965–1968
Presidents of the National Sports Council (1968–1974)
Javier Aramburú Menchaca	1968–1973
Eduardo Guinea Fernández	1973–1974
Presidents of the National Institute of Recreation, Physical Education and Sports (1974–1981)
Guillermo Toro Lira Vásquez	1974–1977
Luciano Cuneo Marsigli	1977–1979
Augusto Gálvez Velarde	1979–1980
Presidents of the National Sports Institute
Victor Nagaro Bianchi	1980–1983
Alberto Musso Vento	1983–1984
Rodolfo Cremer Nicoli	1985
Victor Castagnola Maldonado	1985–1987
Gerardo Maruy Takayama	1987–1989
Michel Azcueta Gorostiza	1990
Luis Pigati Prado	1990–1991
Miguel Daneri Pérez	1991
Enrique Otero Navarro	1992–1996
Arturo Woodman Pollit	1996
Esperanza Jiménez Pérez	1996–1997
Guillermo Wong Miranda	1997
Manuel Forero Vargas	1997–1999
Ángel Galli Álvarez	1999
Teófilo Cubillas Arizaga	1999–2001
Eduardo Schiantarelli Sormani	2001–2003
Iván Dibós Mier	2003–2006
Arturo Woodman Pollit	2006–2011
Francisco Boza Dibós	2011–2014
Saúl Barrera Ayala	2014–2016
Óscar Fernández Cáceres	2016–2018
Sebastián Suito López	2019
Gustavo San Martín Castillo	2019–2022
Julio Rivera Gonzales	2022
Rubén Trujillo Mejía	2022
Máximo Pérez Zevallos	2022
Juan Carlos Huerta Chávarry	2022–2023
Guido Flores Marchán	2023–2024
Federico Tong Hurtado	2024

=== Federated bodies ===
According to El Comercio, there were 60 federated bodies assiged to the IPD. They belong to the following sports:

- Air sports
- American football
- Andes Mountaineering and Winter Sports
- Archery
- Athletics (Article)
- Badminton
- Baseball
- Basketball
- Billiards
- Bocce
- Bodybuilding and Fitness
- Bowling
- Boxing
- Bridge
- Canoeing
- Chess
- Climbing
- Cycling (Article)
- Equestrian sports
- Fencing
- Football (Article)
- Golf
- Gymnastics
- Handball
- Hockey
- Judo
- Karate
- Kart racing
- Kickboxing
- Kung Fu
- Lifesaving
- Modern pentathlon
- Motorsport (automobiles)
- Motorsport (motorcycles)
- Muay Thai
- Paleta frontón
- Polo
- Powerboating
- Powerlifting
- Rowing
- Rugby (Article)
- Sailing
- Sambo (amateur)
- Shooting
- Softball
- Squash
- Surfing
- Swimming
- Taekwondo
- Table tennis
- Tennis
- Triathlon
- Underwater activities
- University Sports
- Volleyball (Article)
- Water skiing
- Weightlifting
- Wresting (amateur)

== See also ==
- Peruvian Olympic Committee
