= COVID-19 hospital =

Hospital designed to treat COVID-19 patients

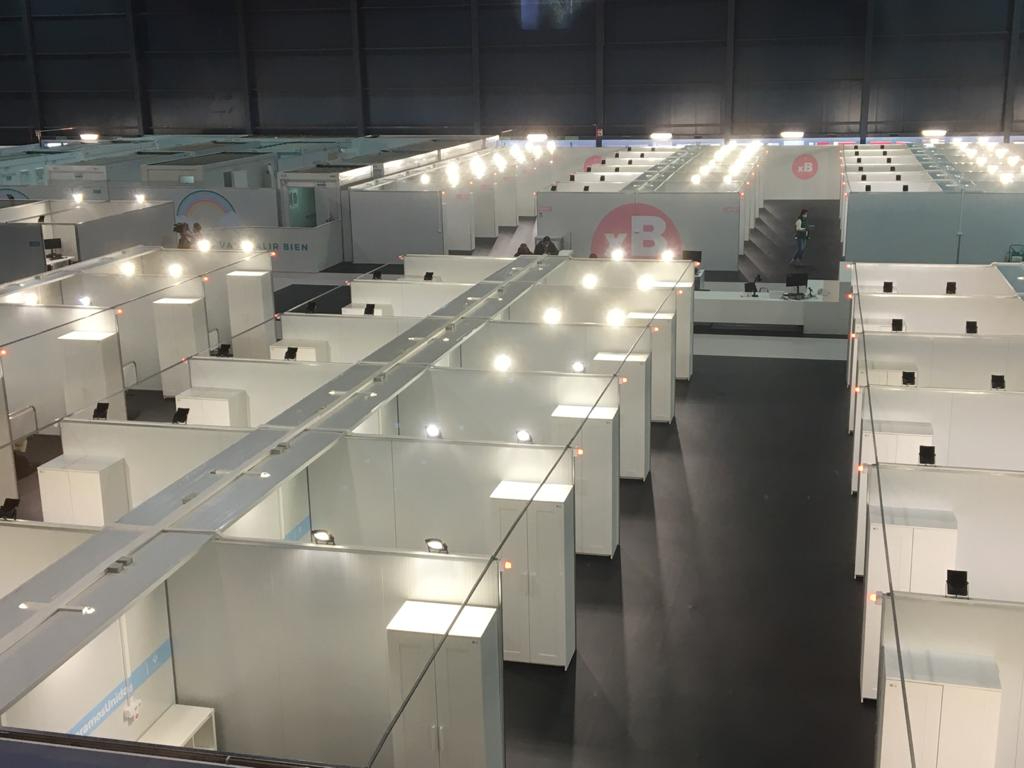
A similar set-up of temporary COVID-19 hospital has been widely adapted worldwide to offer treatment and disease monitoring to patients with mild symptoms.

COVID-19 hospital is a general name given to clinical institutions that provide medical treatment to Coronavirus Disease 2019 (COVID-19) infected patients. According to the World Health Organisation (WHO)'s COVID-19 regulations, it is critical to triage or distribute COVID-19 patients to different medical institutions based on their severity of symptoms and the medical resource availability in different geographical regions. It is recommended by the WHO to distribute patients with the most severe symptoms to the most equipped, COVID-19 focused hospitals, then patients with less severe symptoms to local institutions and lastly, patients with light symptoms to temporary COVID-19 establishments for appropriate isolation and monitoring of disease progression. Countries, like China, Germany, Russia, the United Kingdom and the United States have established their distinctive COVID-19 clinical set-ups based on the general WHO guidelines. Future pandemic protocols have also been adapted based on handling COVID-19 on a national and global scale.

== COVID-19 Hospital Protocols ==
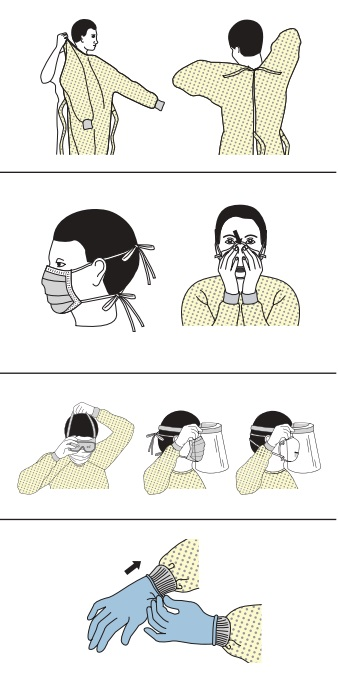
An example of putting on personal protective equipment.

=== Protective regulations for healthcare staff ===
Healthcare staff at designated COVID-19 hospitals are protected with the personal protective equipment (PPE), which includes coveralls, masks, eye protector and gloves. Hospitals have strict regulations for the healthcare staff on disposing of the PPE. The protective wear must be worn at all times when coming in contact with COVID-19 patients and must be taken off after leaving the COVID-19 wards.

=== Testing of SARS-CoV-2 virus prior to hospitalisation ===
Prior to the hospitalisation, patients have to take a series of examinations to test for the presence of SARS-CoV-2 virus in their body. Patients can provide samples of their sputum, faeces or blood for COVID-19 testing. In sputum samples, the virus can be observed 1 to 2 days before the appearance of symptoms and can remain detectable in the body for up to around 2 weeks. In fecal samples, the virus can be detected starting from the fifth day after the onset of symptoms and remains detectable in the body for about a month. Alternatively, a serological test can be performed to see if the patients contain COVID-19 antibodies in their blood. The blood test identifies the development of different immunoglobulins (IgM, IgG and IgM+IgG) in COVID-19 recovered patients.

=== Patients release protocols ===
Guidelines are available to help medical professionals determine which patients are suitable to be released from the hospital. For example, a patient needs to be afebrile for more than 3 days, to show improvements of symptoms, to have satisfactory improvements shown in the X-ray scan of his or her lungs and to have 2 consecutive negative PCR tests on the same day. Even after the official hospital discharge, the patient needs to remain socially distanced from their family members and friends, as the risk of infecting others is not eliminated.

== COVID-19 Hospitals By Region ==
=== China ===
Different regions in China have their designated COVID-hospitals, either transformed from normal hospitals or from large sports halls and exhibition centres. Wuhan, the first recognised region of COVID-19 outbreak, established 45 COVID-19 hospitals. Among the 45 hospitals, 6 of them provide healthcare services to critically endangered patients, and the remaining 39 hospitals offer treatment to severely ill patients and patients who are older than 65 years old. Lastly, patients with less severe symptoms are treated in large sports hall- or exhibition centre- converted hospitals. The exact number of temporary COVID-19 hospitals in Wuhan is unknown, but the number of beds made available to patients increased to more than 50,000.

==== COVID-19 Treatment in hospitals in China ====
In China, the National Health Commission (NHC) launched the National Clinical guidelines (7th edition) to lay out the specific treatments and regulations for handling COVID-19 patients.

The four main policies of the Chinese National Health Commission aim to achieve minimal COVID-19 fatality in COVID-19 hospitals.

1. To localise patients in hospitals that are designated to treat COVID-19
2. To recruit medical experts in the COVID-19 hospitals
3. To obtain sufficient medical resources in COVID-19 hospitals
4. To be able to provide COVID-19 treatment in designated hospitals

Once hospitalised, all patients' blood oxygen levels are constantly monitored. Depending on the severity of their disease progression, they will receive different levels of supportive care, e.g. pharmacological agents to help them fight against the viral metabolism in the body. Some drug examples include chloroquine, phosphate, lopinavir or ritonavir, alpha interferon, ribavirin and arbidol. The dosage and dosing frequency are dependent on the individual patient's disease progression.

For more severely-ill patients, intubation or invasive ventilation and extracorporeal membrane oxygen (ECMO) are used to enhance their chance of survival. ECMO is used to transfuse the patient's blood out of the body and perform oxygenation of the blood with the help of a machine. This method could alleviate the disease burden on the patients and allow the cardiovascular and respiratory systems to recover. It has been reported that the use of ECMO has shown health improvement in 3 out of 4 critically ill patients.

In China, patients also receive traditional Chinese medicine as part of their therapeutic regimen. However, there is limited understanding on evaluating the efficacy of these drugs while they are used in combination with western drugs and or other mechanical supportive equipment.

=== Germany ===
Despite its relative adequateness of intensive care beds compared to other European nations, plans were drafted by the federal and state governments of Germany to further expand care capacity for COVID-19 patients as the pandemic broke out. These plans included the conversion of community halls and hotels, when needed, into COVID-19 centres for treatment of patients with mild conditions.

On March 17, 2020, the local government in Berlin announced plans to convert one exhibition hall in the Messe Berlin exhibition grounds at the capital's Charlottenburg-Wilmersdorf precinct into a temporary hospital containing 1000 beds. The hospital should have the capabilities to treat both minor and emergency COVID-19 cases; but it was only expected to enter service when current hospitals are full.

Construction of the hospital began on April 1, with assistance from the German armed forces. The first phase of construction would provide 500 beds, with 500 more ready to be added.

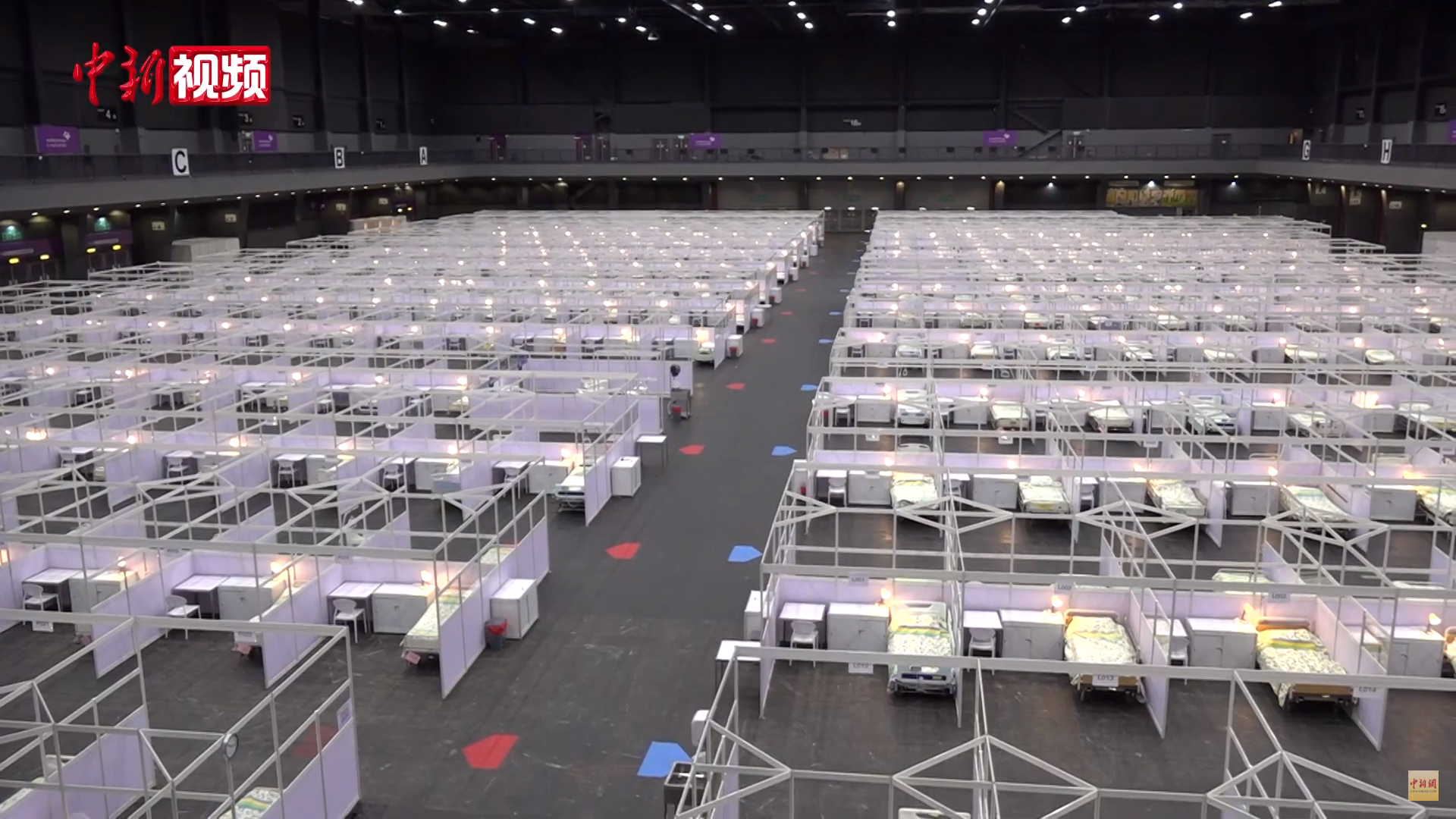
A temporary COVID-19 community treatment facility was set up at AsiaWorld-Expo in Hong Kong, opening on August 1, 2020.

=== Hong Kong ===
Hospital care for COVID-19 patients in Hong Kong at the beginning of the pandemic was provided by existing isolation wards in the city's hospitals. With the number of existing wards being unable to accommodate the increasing patient numbers, the Hong Kong Hospital Authority (HA) sought to convert other wards and community facilities for COVID-19 treatment. For ward conversions, general wards in public hospitals were converted into standard negative pressure isolation wards in two phases, which by August 2020 lifted the total isolation bed capacity to 660. For conversion of community facilities, the AsiaWorld-Expo in Lantau Island has been used as a "community treatment facility" since August 1, 2020, with the venue converted to fit 900 beds to provide isolation and treatment for COVID-19 patients with mild symptoms and stable conditions. As of March 2021, the facility was on standby due to low current demand for beds; however, it can be reactivated into service within 72 hours.

On August 10, 2020, the Hong Kong government announced plans to construct another temporary hospital at Chek Lap Kok, Lantau Island, next to the AsiaWorld-Expo. The proposed hospital comprises 6 blocks, each being a two-storey building, providing 800 to 1000 beds in isolation wards and medical facilities to treat COVID-19 patients with "suitable clinical conditions". The wards and its facilities effectively free up beds in isolation wards of public hospitals as it offers hospital-grade intravenous medications and oxygen therapy.

Construction of the hospital began in October 2020, and was completed in four months, with the number of provided beds confirmed at 816. The facility, named the North Lantau Hospital Hong Kong Infection Control Centre, was handed over to the HA in January 2021 for opening preparations, and patient admissions officially began on February 26.

=== Russia ===
Hospital services in many parts of Russia came under pressure amidst increased patient numbers and poor facilities as the pandemic hit. The strain was particularly heavy in the country's capital, Moscow, despite that they were more equipped than any other region countrywide, but also experienced by far the highest patient numbers. To alleviate this strain, the local Moscow government started the construction of temporary hospitals in the suburbs of Moscow in mid-2020, mostly near existing large clinics. Most buildings were not converted from existing infrastructure, but built from scratch. By late-October 2020, Moscow had around 50 temporary hospitals in operation, providing 3000 beds.

One of the few converted hospitals is located at the Krylatskoye Ice Palace, an indoor ice arena most known for hosting international ice skating tournaments, including the 2005 World Allround Speed Skating Championships. It was converted and began operations in October 2020, and subsequently had a capacity of 1300 beds.

=== United Kingdom ===
The British National Health Service (NHS) took action to set up temporary COVID-19 hospitals nationwide when the first widespread COVID-19 outbreak hit the nation in March 2020.

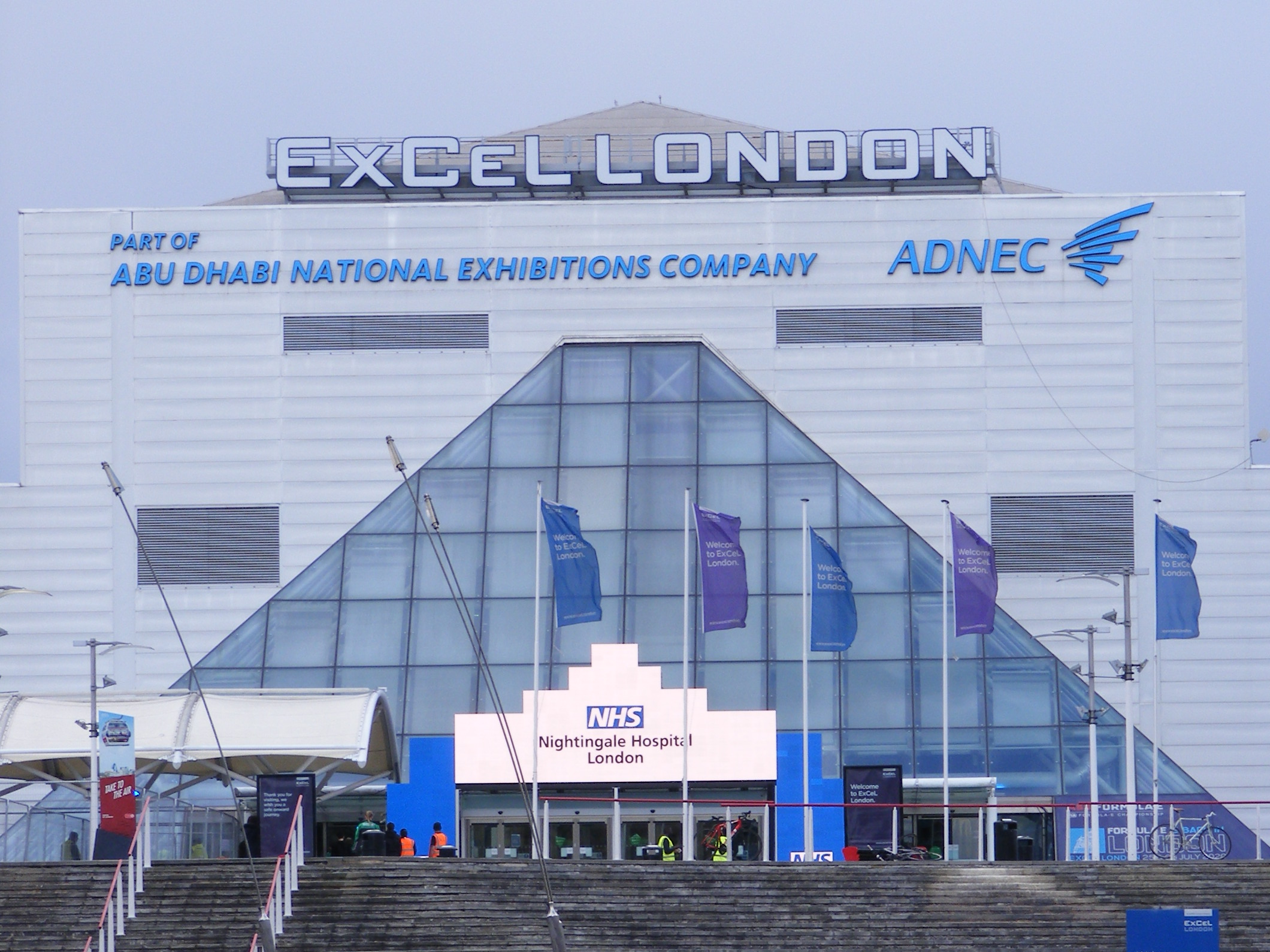
The entrance to the NHS Nightingale Hospital London, pictured 30 March 2020.

In England, the construction of 7 temporary hospitals was announced in succession between 24 March and 10 April 2020 by the UK government and the NHS, collectively named the NHS Nightingale Hospitals. These hospitals, collectively providing up to 13700 beds, were planned to house COVID-19 patients with mild conditions, in order to vacate capacity in other NHS hospitals for more critical patients. Most of the 7 hospitals were converted from current exhibition centres: for example, the NHS Nightingale Hospital London was located at ExCeL London; while the Birmingham hospital was housed by the National Exhibition Centre. The London facility was the first to open on 3 April; 6 of the 7 hospitals were opened by 5 May.

Only 3 of the 7 hospitals admitted COVID-19 patients. All NHS Nightingale hospitals were "placed on standby" after June 2020, and were shut down starting from April 2021.

The NHS also constructed temporary hospitals in other parts of the UK, in similar fashion to the English NHS Nightingale Hospitals. During April to May 2020, Scotland, Wales, Northern Ireland, Jersey, and Gibraltar all had one or more hospitals opened.

=== United States ===
From March 2020, when the COVID-19 pandemic first hit the USA, rapidly rising patient numbers caused US hospitals nationwide to face a critical shortage of beds, manpower, and medical supplies.

In response to the bed shortages, the US Army Corps of Engineers announced plans in late-March to construct as many as 341 temporary hospitals across the country. Plans were scaled down when construction began in early April, with 17 existing sites converted into hospitals, providing around 15000 beds. Most of the hospitals were completed and opened in mid to late April.

By early May, only 4 of 17 hospitals had treated COVID-19 patients, with none reaching its full capacity. Most of the hospitals have since been put into standby or shut down.

== Future directions for infection control in hospitals ==
The World Health Organisation (WHO) and national pandemic response teams, such as the UK Health Security Agency have suggested regulations to ease and control the infection burden on a national and global scale for preventing future outbreaks of transmissible infections.

Some general suggestions are listed as follows:

- All healthcare workers in the hospital should remain vigilant of the incoming susceptible patient(s) and personal protective protocols should be taken as needed.
- Hospitals need to maintain good communication networks for letting designated clinical centres to receive infected patients and for transporting patients from point to point in an efficient and safe manner.
- Healthcare departments of all countries need to plan pre-outbreak protocols to protect the populations with a weak immunity, such as the elderly, the youth and the people with long-term illnesses.
- Hospitals need to establish rapid response teams in face of a disease outbreak.
- Hospitals should be well-equipped with life supporting machines for severely ill patients, such as pulse oximeters, oxygen and invasive support and other supplies, such as medication and personal protective equipment.
- All hospital services should be strategically distributed throughout the country during an infection outbreak, so that essential and emergency medical treatments can be provided on a standard basis.
