= National Stadium of Peru =

Stadium in Lima, Peru

- Estadio Nacional del Perú

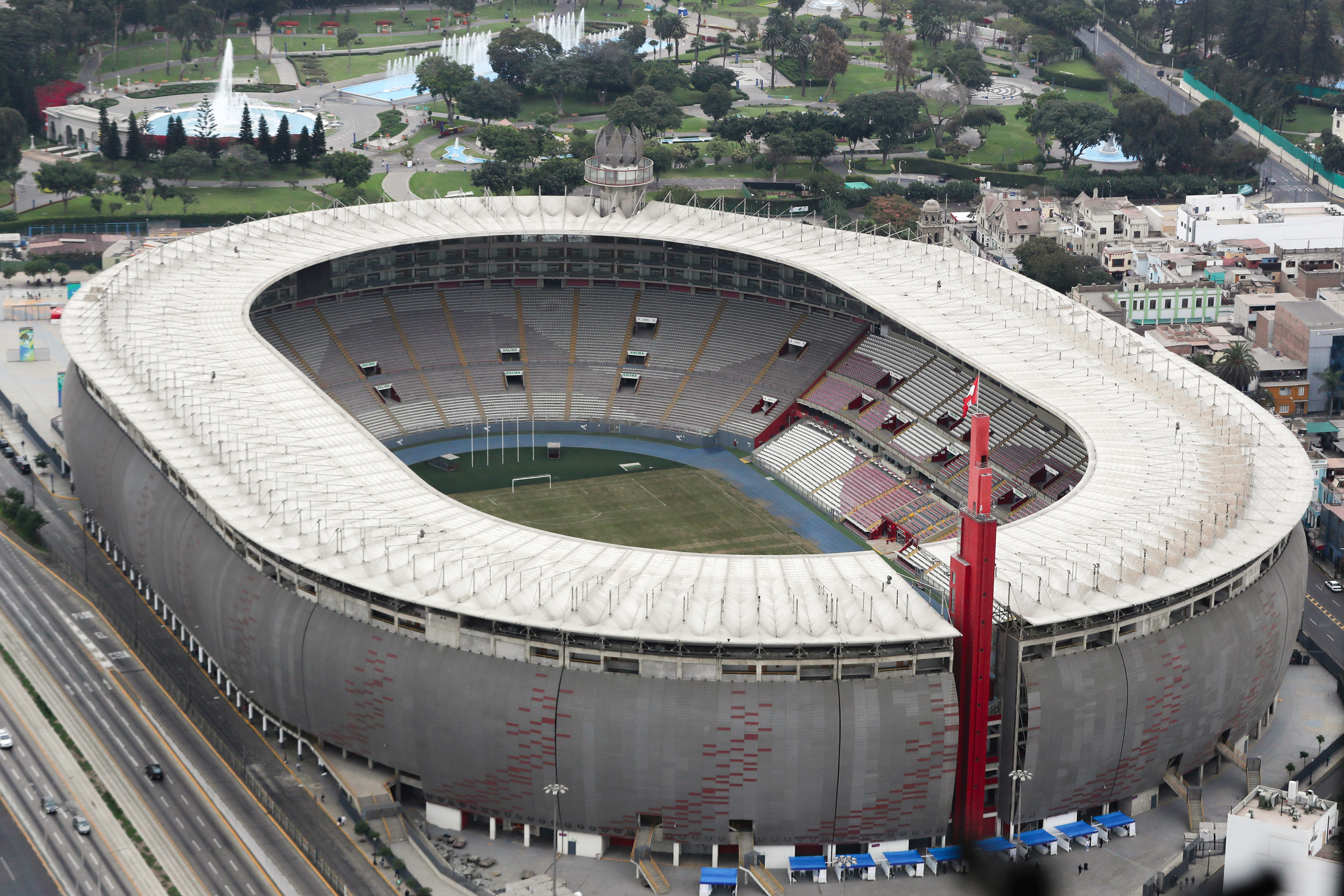
- Estadio Nacional in 2021
- Interactive map of National Stadium of Peru
- Full name: Estadio Nacional del Perú
- Location: Lima District, Lima, Peru
- Coordinates: 12°04′02″S 77°02′01″W
- Elevation: 135 m (443 ft)
- Owner: Government of Peru
- Operator: Peruvian Sports Institute
- Capacity: 40,272
- Surface: Grass
- Field size: 104.9 x 67.86 m
- Public transit: at Estadio Nacional

Construction
- Built: 1951–1952
- Opened: 27 October 1952
- Renovated: 1992, 1996, 2004, 2011
- Expanded: 2004, 2011
- Architect: José Betín Diez Canseco (Renovation)
- Project manager: Miguel Dasso

Tenant
- Peru national football team (1952–present)

The National Stadium of Peru (Spanish: Estadio Nacional del Perú, pronounced [esˈtaðjo nasjoˈnal del peˈɾu]) is a multi-purpose stadium in Lima, Peru. Its current capacity is 40,272 seats as stated by the Peruvian Football Federation and Instituto Peruano del Deporte. An additional 3,509 spectators can be seated in the box suites that stand above the four main stands. However, government regulations limit ticket sales to 90% of the stadium's maximum capacity, reducing it in the stands to 36,244 and 3,158 in box suites. The stadium was first inaugurated on 27 October 1952 for the 1953 South American Championship—replacing the old National Stadium—and is Peru's principal and national stadium. It has hosted three of the six South American Championship/Copa América football competitions held in Peru. It is referred to as the Coloso de José Díaz because of its proximity to a street of the same name. It is located at an altitude of 135 meters (442.91 ft) above sea level.

The Estadio Nacional is the home ground of the Peru national football team. The Peruvian Sports Institute (IPD)—a branch of the Ministry of Education—is the stadium's administrating entity. The stadium has undergone several renovations for tournaments such as the 2004 Copa América. The artificial turf was installed for the 2005 FIFA U-17 World Championship. The most recent renovation started in 2010 and concluded in 2011. The re-inauguration ceremony of the renovated stadium was held on 24 July 2011 with a match between the Peru national under-20 football team and the Spain national under-20 football team.

== History ==
=== Early history ===
Peru obtained its first football-based field in the late 19th century, when the club Unión Cricket asked the Municipality of Lima for an appropriate piece of land where they could play football. The municipality gave them a small piece of land in the Santa Beatriz neighbourhood which belonged to a shooting club. On July 18, 1897, the field was officially inaugurated and named Estadio Guadalupe. The Liga Peruana de Futbol (known as the FPF today) used it for the first tournaments in Lima.

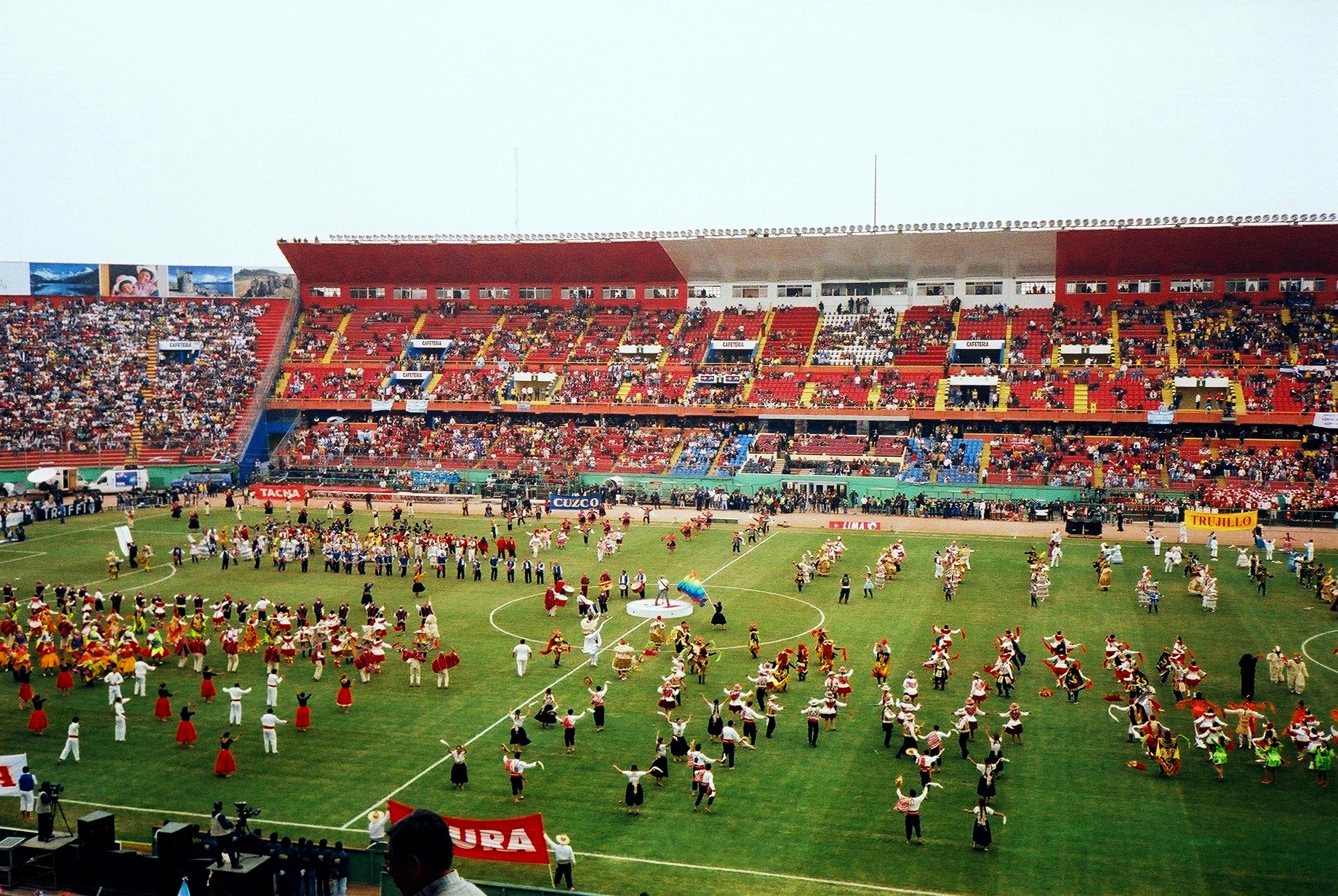
Close up of the pitch in pre-match celebrations at the 2004 Copa America

In 1921, the English residents of Peru that owned the stadium renovated and renamed the stadium from Estadio Guadalupe to Stadium Nacional and donated it to the Peruvian government. It had small wooden stands that were later donated to the Estadio Teodoro Lolo Fernandez when it was demolished to make way for the new stadium which would host the 1953 South American Championship. In the 1950s, Miguel Dasso and the Peruvian President General Manuel A. Odria funded the project for the construction of the new stadium. The new stadium was planned to have a capacity of 53,000 and have it entirely made out of cement. The northern and southern stands would have a capacity of 15,000 each while the eastern and western stands would have three levels. On 27 October 1952, the new Estadio Nacional was inaugurated with many comfortable features such as luxury boxes and elevators in one of the stands. The inauguration ceremony started early at 10:00 AM and lasted through the night. The ceremony included an award ceremony for many outstanding athletes including Teodoro Fernández, Alejandro Villanueva, Jorge Alcalde, Olympic gold medalist Edwin Vásquez and Pan American gold medalists Julia Sánchez and Gerardo Salazar. The inaugurating football match was played between players of the Peru national football team that formed two teams that played in the evening under the new illumination system.

=== 1964 tragedy ===
On 24 May 1964, Peru hosted Argentina in the Estadio Nacional before a crowd of 47,157 for a qualifying match pertaining to the 1964 Olympic Games that were to be hosted in Tokyo. Argentina led the match 1–0 during the second half and in the final minutes Peru equalized; however the Uruguayan referee Ángel Eduardo Pazos disallowed the goal. The spectators were infuriated by the decision and this led to a pitch invasion. The police used tear gas and brutal force to quell the disturbances. The stadium's exits were closed which trapped the spectators inside the stadium. The players and referees had to be escorted off the field by the police. A riot ensued outside the stadium and led the President Fernando Belaúnde Terry to declare a state of emergency which would last for a month. More than 300 people were killed and at least 4,000 were injured.

=== Tournaments hosted ===
The Stadium Nacional was the sole venue for the South American Championship 1927, 1935, and 1939. The present Estadio Nacional hosted the 1953 South American Championship and 1957 South American Championship. In 1971, the playoff match for the 1971 Copa Libertadores Finals was played in Peru and featured Uruguayan Nacional and Argentine Estudiantes de La Plata. Nacional won by 2–0. The following year, Universitario de Deportes reached the final of the 1972 Copa Libertadores and hosted the first-leg of the finals. Two decades later, Sporting Cristal reached the 1997 Copa Libertadores Finals which allowed the Nacional to host one of the legs of the final for a third time. In 1992, modern lighting was installed in the stadium and in 1996, an electronic scoreboard was installed to replace the old manual one. The stadium's symbolic element is the tower situated in the northern stand. This tower was abandoned for many years until in 2004, it was used again for the Copa America. Popular international football teams and renowned players have played in the stadium, including Spain's Real Madrid, as well as players like Pelé and Maradona in previous years.

Thanks to a five million dollar government investment program to remodel older Peruvian stadiums, spectators were able to enjoy games with the high standards required by CONMEBOL for the 2004 Copa América. This was also the first time the Estadio Nacional was not the sole venue for the South American competition. In return the country received throngs of tourists, international media coverage, and more locals buying tickets to attend the games. Peru's biggest stadium, Estadio Monumental, is also located in Lima with a capacity of 80,093 and belongs to local club Universitario de Deportes although it was not used for the Copa América 2004.

Peru also hosted the 2005 FIFA U-17 World Championship. This stadium hosted several games including the final. Artificial turf was installed for this competition into all the venues used. The artificial turf still remains in the Estadio Nacional but has received heavy criticism from clubs of the Peruvian First Division, asking to remove it because of the constant injuries it causes. This is also the reason why the Peru national football team did not play its games in the Estadio Nacional for the 2010 FIFA World Cup Qualifiers. The artificial turf was removed following the 2010 renovations.

In 2008, the athletics track was temporarily covered with asphalt for the rally race Caminos del Inca. This was the first time the Estadio Nacional hosted such an event. Shortly after, the 6-lane Olympic running track was restored.

=== 2010 renovations ===
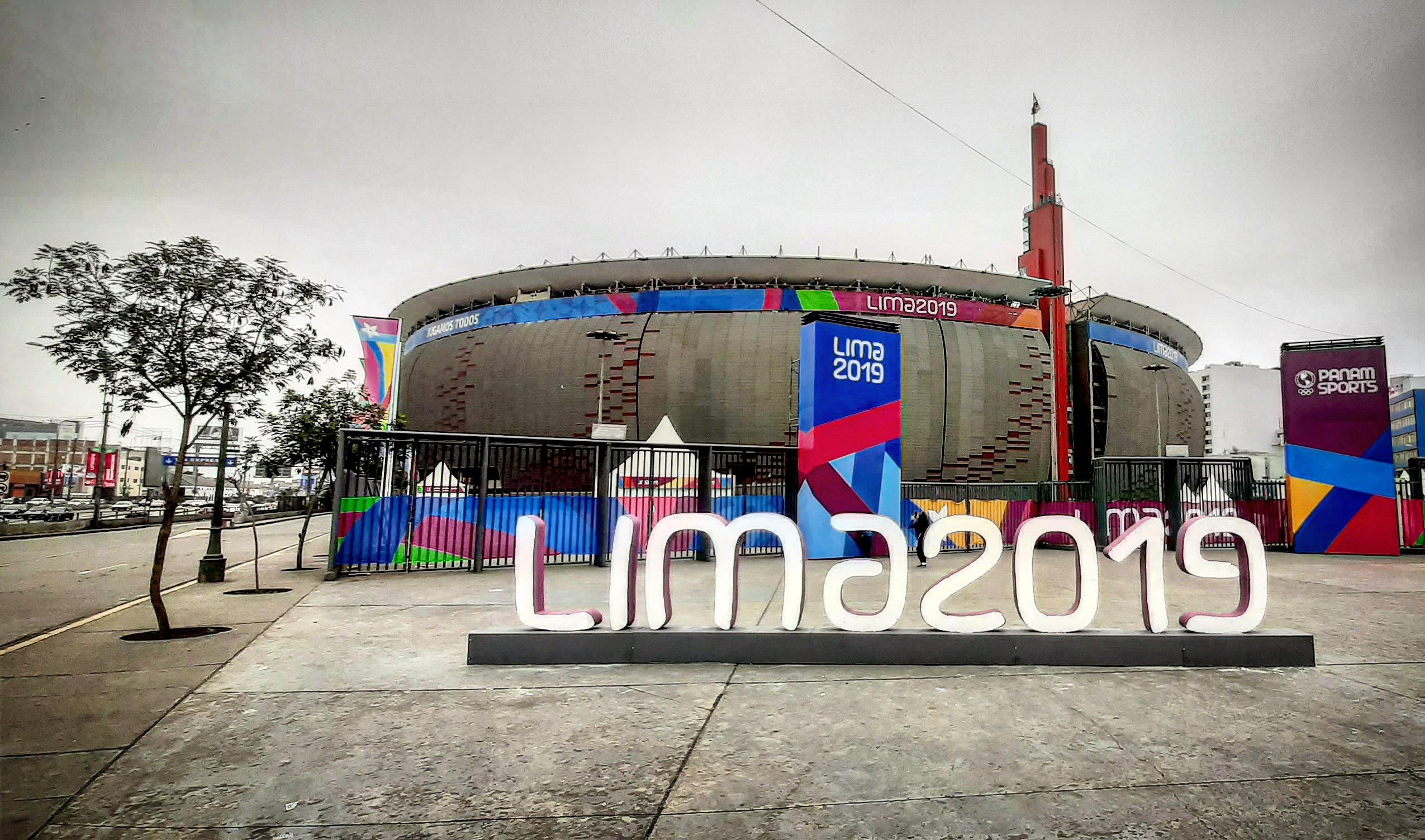
Estadio Nacional during the 2019 Pan American Games

The stadium underwent major renovations in 2010 in a bid to the 2015 Pan American Games which included the construction of 371 luxury boxes, 703 underground parking spaces, a new tower with a panoramic gourmet restaurant among other improvements. The renovations concluded in 2011. However, Toronto won the bidding process. The renovated stadium was inaugurated on 24 July 2011 with an U-20 match between Peru and Spain. The match was a 0–0 draw. Two months later on 5 September 2011, the senior national team played its first match in the renovated stadium against Bolivia. The match ended in a 2–2 draw with goals by Rinaldo Cruzado and Claudio Pizarro. It was used for the opening and closing ceremonies for the 2019 Pan American Games and the 2019 Parapan American Games. It will host the Pan American Games again in 2027, which will be hosted by Lima.

In addition to football, the Estadio Nacional is home to other sports. Sixteen Peruvian sporting federations are headquartered at the national stadium. These include the Boxing, Karate, Bodybuilding, Kung Fu, Taekwondo and Volleyball federations. They were temporarily relocated for the renovations of the stadium.

== 2004 Copa America ==
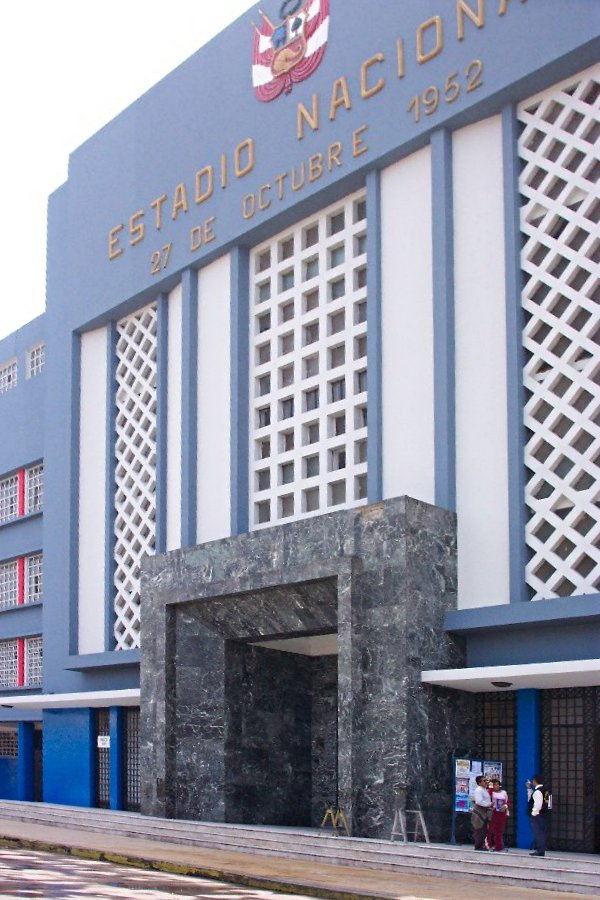
The stadium's western entrance before 2009

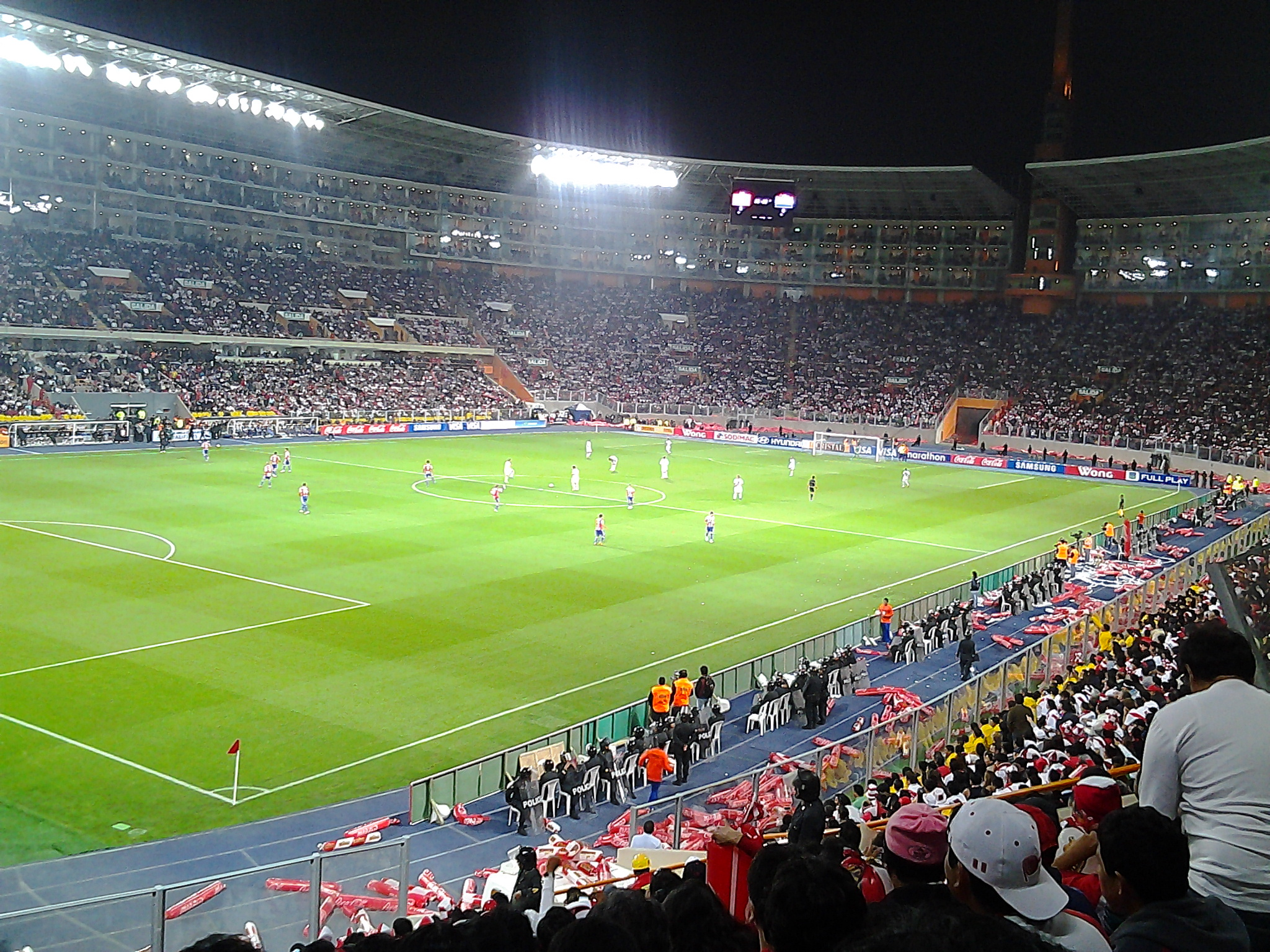
The North stand during a football match in 2011

| Date | Time | Team #1 | Score | Team #2 | Round |
|---|---|---|---|---|---|
| 6 July 2004 | 17:30 | Venezuela | 0–1 | Colombia | Group A |
| 6 July 2004 | 20:15 | Peru | 2–2 | Bolivia | Group A |
| 9 July 2004 | 17:30 | Colombia | 1–0 | Bolivia | Group A |
| 9 July 2004 | 19:45 | Peru | 3–1 | Venezuela | Group A |
| 20 July 2004 | 19:45 | Argentina | 3–0 | Colombia | Semi-finals |
| 21 July 2004 | 19:45 | Uruguay | 1–1 (3–5 p) | Brazil | Semi-finals |
| 25 July 2004 | 15:00 | Argentina | 2–2 (2–4 p) | Brazil | Final |

== 2005 U-17 World Championship ==
| Date | Time | Team #1 | Score | Team #2 | Round |
|---|---|---|---|---|---|
| 16 September 2005 | 14:15 | Uruguay | 0–2 | Mexico | Group B |
| 16 September 2005 | 17:00 | Turkey | 1–0 | Australia | Group B |
| 19 September 2005 | 15:30 | Mexico | 3–0 | Australia | Group B |
| 19 September 2005 | 18:15 | Uruguay | 2–3 | Turkey | Group B |
| 23 September 2005 | 15:30 | United States | 1–1 | Ivory Coast | Group C |
| 23 September 2005 | 18:15 | Gambia | 0–2 | Netherlands | Group D |
| 2 October 2005 | 15:00 | Netherlands | 2–0 | Turkey | Third place play-off |
| 2 October 2005 | 18:00 | Mexico | 3–0 | Brazil | Final |

== Other events ==
The stadium is also used for other kind of activities such as concerts including:

- Phil Collins (1995)
- Santana (1995)
- Travis
- R.E.M. (November 11, 2008)
- Soda Stereo (December 8 and 9, 2007)
- Deep Purple (amphitheater)
- Whitesnake (amphitheater)
- Cyndi Lauper (amphitheater)
- Canto Por El Sur (Gian Marco, Erika Ender, Pedro Suárez Vértiz, Christian Meier, Juan Luis Guerra, Alejandro Fernández, and many others)
- Voces Solidarias (Gian Marco, David Bisbal, Pedro Suárez Vértiz, Fito Páez, Alejandro Sanz, La Oreja de Van Gogh, Hombres G, Belanova, and many others)
- Los Fabulosos Cadillacs (November 29, 2008)
- Iron Maiden (March 26, 2009)
- The B-52's and New York Dolls
- KISS (April 14, 2009)
- Marc Anthony
- Oasis (April 30, 2009)
- Boy George (amphitheater)
- RBD
- Jonas Brothers and Demi Lovato (May 18 and 19, 2009)
- Red Hot Chili Peppers (September 14, 2011)
- WWE Summerslam Tour
- WWE Road to Wrestlemania 25 Tour
- Justin Bieber (October 17, 2011)
- Elton John (February 1, 2012)
- Jamiroquai (February 20, 2013)
- Alejandro Sanz (February 26, 2013)
- The Cure (April 18, 2013)
- The Killers (April 4, 2013)
- Metallica (March 20, 2014)
- Paul McCartney (April 25, 2014)
- One Direction (April 27, 2014)
- Teen Top (August 20, 2014)
- Romeo Santos (April 23, 2015)
- Coldplay (April 5, 2016)
- Slipknot (October 18, 2016)
- Aerosmith (October 24, 2016)
- Justin Bieber (April 5, 2017)
- Linkin Park (May 11, 2017)
- Ed Sheeran (May 13, 2017)
- Incubus and Maroon 5 (September 19, 2017)
- Bruno Mars (November 30, 2017)
- Depeche Mode (March 18, 2018)
- Radiohead (April 17, 2018)
- Bon Jovi (October 2, 2019)
- Coldplay (September 13 and 14, 2022)
- Daddy Yankee (October 18 and 19, 2022)
- Bad Bunny (November 13 and 14, 2022)
- Harry Styles (November 29, 2022)
- Romeo Santos (February 10, 11, 12, 14, 2023)
- Roger Waters (October 29, 2023)
- Luis Miguel (February 24, 25, 2024)
- Libido (July 6, 2024)
- Niall Horan (October 6, 2024)
- Paul McCartney (October 27, 2024)
- Shakira (February 17, November 15, 16 and 18, 2025)
- Tabernacle Choir and Orchestra at Temple Square (February 22, 2025)
- System of a Down (April 27, 2025)
- Guns N' Roses (November 5, 2025)
- Bad Bunny (January 16 and 17, 2026)
- Ed Sheeran (May 20, 2026)
- TINI (May 30, 2026)
- Iron Maiden (October 17, 2026)
- Christina Aguilera (November 21, 2026)
- Slipknot (September 14, 2027)

| Preceded by Estádio São Januário; Rio de Janeiro | South American Championship; Final venue 1953 | Succeeded by Estadio Nacional; Santiago |
| Preceded by Estadio Centenario; Montevideo | South American Championship; Final venue 1957 | Succeeded by River Plate Stadium; Buenos Aires |
| Preceded by Estadio El Campín; Bogotá | Copa América; Final venue 2004 | Succeeded by Estadio José Pachencho Romero; Maracaibo |
| Preceded by Finnair Stadium; Helsinki | FIFA U-17 World Championship; Final venue 2005 | Succeeded by Seoul World Cup Stadium; Seoul |
| Preceded by Rogers Centre; Toronto | Pan American Games; Opening and closing ceremonies 2019 | Succeeded by Estadio Nacional Julio Martínez Prádanos; Santiago |
